= Margaret River Pro 2016 (women) =

Surf
- Location: Margaret River (AUS)
- Dates: 8 to 19 April
- Competitors: 18 from 6 nations

Medalists
gold medal	Tyler Wright	Australia
silver medal	C.Conlogue	United States

The Margaret River Pro 2016 was an event of the Association of Surfing Professionals for 2016 World Surf League.

This event was held from 15 to 26 April at Margaret River, (Western Australia, Australia) and opposed by 18 surfers.

The tournament was won by Tyler Wright (AUS), who beat C.Conlogue (USA) in final.

== Round 1 ==
Heat 1
1	T. Weston-Webb	(Hawaii)	13.60
2	Keely Andrew	(Australia)	13.43
3	B. Buitendag	(South Africa)	8.63

Heat 2
1	Sally Fitzgibbons	(Australia)	15.57
2	Malia Manuel	(Hawaii)	13.67
3	Chelsea Tuach	(Barbados)	10.60

Heat 3
1	C.Conlogue	(United States)	13.40
2	Alessa Quizon	(Hawaii)	10.37
3	Felicity Palmateer	(Australia)	9.43

Heat 4
1	Carissa Moore	(Hawaii)	15.77
2	Laura Enever	(Australia)	12.83
3	Sage Erickson	(United States)	10.57

Heat 5
1	Nikki Van Dijk	(Australia)	14.80
2	Coco Ho	(Hawaii)	12.16
3	Tyler Wright	(Australia)	8.77

Heat 6
1	Bronte Macaulay	(Australia)	14.60
2	S. Gilmore	(Australia)	7.77
3	Johanne Defay	(France)	7.00

== Round 2 ==
Heat 1: 1 / Malia Manuel / (Hawaii) / 14.10; 2 / Keely Andrew / (Australia) / 6.70	Heat 2: 1 / B. Buitendag / (South Africa) / 11.83; 2 / Chelsea Tuach / (Barbados) / 9.00	Heat 3: 1 / Tyler Wright / (Australia) / 18.00; 2 / Felicity Palmateer / (Australia) / 14.16

Heat 4: 1 / Laura Enever / (Australia) / 10.10; 2 / Johanne Defay / (France) / 7.36	Heat 5: 1 / S. Gilmore / (Australia) / 15.10; 2 / Coco Ho / (Hawaii) / 12.67	Heat 6: 1 / Sage Erickson / (United States) / 15.04; 2 / Alessa Quizon / (Hawaii) / 10.66

== Round 3 ==
Heat 1
1	Sally Fitzgibbons	(Australia)	15.55
2	T. Weston-Webb	(Hawaii)	8.83
3	Laura Enever	(Australia)	6.00

Heat 2
1	C.Conlogue	(United States)	15.33
2	Malia Manuel	(Hawaii)	12.63
3	Nikki Van Dijk	(Australia)	7.00

Heat 3
1	Carissa Moore	(Hawaii)	16.50
2	B. Buitendag	(South Africa)	15.50
3	Sage Erickson	(United States)	15.23

Heat 4
1	Tyler Wright	(Australia)	11.97
2	S. Gilmore	(Australia)	11.94
3	Bronte Macaulay	(Australia)	9.30

== Round 4 ==
Heat 1: 1 / T. Weston-Webb / (Hawaii) / 11.87; 2 / Nikki Van Dijk / (Australia) / 10.90	Heat 2: 1 / Laura Enever / (Australia) / 14.50; 2 / Malia Manuel / (Hawaii) / 14.20	Heat 3: 1 / B. Buitendag / (South Africa) / 14.60; 2 / Bronte Macaulay / (Australia) / 9.44	Heat 4: 1 / S. Gilmore / (Australia) / 17.10v; 2 / Sage Erickson / (United States) / 14.74

== Quarter finals ==
Heat 1: 1 / T. Weston-Webb / (Hawaii) / 15.00; 2 / Sally Fitzgibbons / (Australia) / 7.20	Heat 2: 1 / C.Conlogue / (United States) / 17.33; 2 / Laura Enever / (Australia) / 6.67	Heat 3: 1 / Carissa Moore / (Hawaii) / 14.57; 2 / B. Buitendag / (South Africa) / 6.40	Heat 4: 1 / Tyler Wright / (Australia) / 16.53; 2 / S. Gilmore / (Australia) / 8.74

== Semi finals ==
Heat 1: 1 / C.Conlogue / (United States) / 17.44; 2 / T. Weston-Webb / (Hawaii) / 12.17	Heat 2: 1 / Tyler Wright / (Australia) / 15.07; 2 / Carissa Moore / (Hawaii) / 14.77

== Final ==
Heat 1
1	Tyler Wright	(Australia)	18.67
2	C.Conlogue	(United States)	14.70
