= Roxy Pro Gold Coast 2017 =

Quiksilver Pro Gold Coast at the Surf
- Location: Gold Coast (AUS)
- Dates: 14 to 25 March
- Competitors: 18 from 5 nations

Medalists
gold medal	S. Gilmore	Australia
silver medal	Lakey Peterson	United States

The Roxy Pro Gold Coast 2017 was an event of the Association of Surfing Professionals for 2017 World Surf League.

This event was held from 14 to 25 March at Gold Coast, (Queensland, Australia) and contested by 36 surfers.

The tournament was won by S. Gilmore (AUS), who beat Lakey Peterson (US) in final.

== Round 1 ==
Heat 1
1	Sally Fitzgibbons	(Australia)	14.80
2	Keely Andrew	(Australia)	13.33
3	Johanne Defay	(France)	10.57

Heat 2
1	T. Weston-Webb	(Hawaii)	13.43
2	Sage Erickson	(United States)	9.70
3	Bronte Macaulay	(Australia)	7.93

Heat 3
1	Nikki Van Dijk	(Australia)	15.16
2	Tyler Wright	(Australia)	12.30
3	Alyssa Lock	(Australia)	9.94

Heat 4
1	C.Conlogue	(United States)	12.90
2	Pauline Ado	(France)	12.23
3	Silvana Lima	(Brazil)	12.17

Heat 5
1	Carissa Moore	(Hawaii)	11.10
2	Coco Ho	(Hawaii)	5.67
3	Laura Enever	(Australia)	2.43

Heat 6
1	S. Gilmore	(Australia)	14.24
2	Lakey Peterson	(United States)	13.33
3	Malia Manuel	(Hawaii)	7.50

== Round 2 ==
Heat 1: 1 / Keely Andrew / (Australia) / 12.67; 2 / Laura Enever / (Australia) / 9.13	Heat 2: 1 / Bronte Macaulay / (Australia) / 15.40; 2 / Sage Erickson / (United States) / 13.17	Heat 3: 1 / Tyler Wright / (Australia) / 17.50; 2 / Alyssa Lock / (Australia) / 12.33

Heat 4: 1 / Johanne Defay / (France) / 15.90; 2 / Pauline Ado / (France) / 13.93	Heat 5: 1 / Coco Ho / (Hawaii) / 14.50; 2 / Malia Manuel / (Hawaii) / 14.36	Heat 6: 1 / Lakey Peterson / (United States) / 19.27; 2 / Silvana Lima / (Brazil) / 13.40

== Round 3 ==
Heat 1
1	Johanne Defay	(France)	17.20
2	Coco Ho	(Hawaii)	15.66
3	T. Weston-Webb	(Hawaii)	15.37

Heat 2
1	Tyler Wright	(Australia)	16.93
2	Lakey Peterson	(United States)	16.00
3	Nikki Van Dijk	(Australia)	11.44

Heat 3
1	Keely Andrew	(Australia)	14.77
2	Sally Fitzgibbons	(Australia)	14.54
3	C.Conlogue	(United States)	13.53

Heat 4
1	Carissa Moore	(Hawaii)	16.70
2	S. Gilmore	(Australia)	16.54
3	Bronte Macaulay	(Australia)	12.23

== Round 4 ==
Heat 1: 1 / Nikki Van Dijk / (Australia) / 15.67; 2 / Coco Ho / (Hawaii) / 14.94	Heat 2: 1 / Lakey Peterson / (United States) / 13.43; 2 / T. Weston-Webb / (Hawaii) / 13.17	Heat 3: 1 / Sally Fitzgibbons / (Australia) / 16.50; 2 / Bronte Macaulay / (Australia) / 11.83	Heat 4: 1 / S. Gilmore / (Australia) / 16.40; 2 / C.Conlogue / (United States) / 16.33

== Quarter-finals ==
Heat 1: 1 / Johanne Defay / (France) / 13.44; 2 / Nikki Van Dijk / (Australia) / 9.50	Heat 2: 1 / Lakey Peterson / (United States) / 17.10; 2 / Tyler Wright / (Australia) / 9.93	Heat 3: 1 / Sally Fitzgibbons / (Australia) / 14.00; 2 / Keely Andrew / (Australia) / 13.63	Heat 4: 1 / S. Gilmore / (Australia) / 17.50; 2 / Carissa Moore / (Hawaii) / 13.83

== Semi-finals ==
Heat 1: 1 / Lakey Peterson / (United States) / 18.60; 2 / Johanne Defay / (France) / 13.70	Heat 2: 1 / S. Gilmore / (Australia) / 16.27; 2 / Sally Fitzgibbons / (Australia) / 14.86

== Final ==
Heat 1
1	S. Gilmore	(Australia)	16.60
2	Lakey Peterson	(United States)	12.66
