= Fiji Women's Pro 2016 =

Surfing event

Fiji Women's Pro 2016 at the Surf
- Location: Namotu (FJI)
- Dates: 29 May to 03 June
- Competitors: 18 from 6 nations

Medalists
gold medal	Johanne Defay	France
silver medal	Carissa Moore	Hawaii

The Fiji Women's Pro 2016 was an event of the Association of Surfing Professionals for 2016 World Surf League.

This event was held from 29 May to 3 June at Namotu, (Tavarua, Fiji) and opposed by 18 surfers.

The tournament was won by Johanne Defay (FRA), who beat Carissa Moore (HAW) in final.

== Round 1 ==
Heat 1
1	Malia Manuel	(Hawaii)	15.67
2	Alessa Quizon	(Hawaii)	14.53
3	T. Weston-Webb	(Hawaii)	6.47

Heat 2
1	Sally Fitzgibbons	(Australia)	14.20
2	B. Buitendag	(South Africa)	10.57
3	Keely Andrew	(Australia)	10.37

Heat 3
1	Nikki Van Dijk	(Australia)	10.83
2	Tyler Wright	(Australia)	9.60
3	Bethany Hamilton	(Hawaii)	8.40

Heat 4
1	C.Conlogue	(United States)	16.27
2	Bronte Macaulay	(Australia)	11.94
3	Coco Ho	(Hawaii)	11.67

Heat 5
1	Carissa Moore	(Hawaii)	15.90
2	Sage Erickson	(United States)	12.44
3	Chelsea Tuach	(Barbados)	5.93

Heat 6
1	S. Gilmore	(Australia)	13.87
2	Laura Enever	(Australia)	11.03
3	Johanne Defay	(France)	10.77

== Round 2 ==
Heat 1: 1 / Sage Erickson / (United States) / 13.74; 2 / Alessa Quizon / (Hawaii) / 5.40	Heat 2: 1 / B. Buitendag / (South Africa) / 13.54; 2 / Keely Andrew / (Australia) / 7.70	Heat 3: 1 / B. Hamilton / (Hawaii) / 16.10; 2 / Tyler Wright / (Australia) / 14.90

Heat 4: 1 / Coco Ho / (Hawaii) / 15.10; 2 / T. Weston-Webb / (Hawaii) / 9.54	Heat 5: 1 / Johanne Defay / (France) / 16.33; 2 / Chelsea Tuach / (Barbados) / 8.44	Heat 6: 1 / Laura Enever / (Australia) / 15.83; 2 / Bronte Macaulay / (Australia) / 14.44

== Round 3 ==
Heat 1
1	B. Hamilton	(Hawaii)	15.74
2	S. Gilmore	(Australia)	14.77
3	Johanne Defay	(France)	12.43

Heat 2
1	C.Conlogue	(United States)	18.67
2	Sage Erickson	(United States)	14.50
3	Nikki Van Dijk	(Australia)	12.24

Heat 3
1	Carissa Moore	(Hawaii)	18.46
2	Laura Enever	(Australia)	16.50
3	B. Buitendag	(South Africa)	13.50

Heat 4
1	Sally Fitzgibbons	(Australia)	16.37
2	Coco Ho	(Hawaii)	11.26
3	Malia Manuel	(Hawaii)	8.84

== Round 4 ==
Heat 1: 1 / Nikki Van Dijk / (Australia) / 13.17; 2 / S. Gilmore / (Australia) / 12.84	Heat 2: 1 / Johanne Defay / (France) / 14.70; 2 / Sage Erickson / (United States) / 14.64	Heat 3: 1 / Laura Enever / (Australia) / 16.90; 2 / Malia Manuel / (Hawaii) / 13.87	Heat 4: 1 / B. Buitendag / (South Africa) / 16.93; 2 / Coco Ho / (Hawaii) / 9.10

== Quarter finals ==
Heat 1: 1 / B. Hamilton / (Hawaii) / 12.33; 2 / Nikki Van Dijk / (Australia) / 11.26	Heat 2: 1 / Johanne Defay / (France) / 15.07; 2 / C.Conlogue / (United States) / 14.00	Heat 3: 1 / Carissa Moore / (Hawaii) / 19.03; 2 / Laura Enever / (Australia) / 15.77	Heat 4: 1 / B. Buitendag / (South Africa) / 14.40; 2 / Sally Fitzgibbons / (Australia) / 10.67

== Semi finals ==
Heat 1: 1 / Johanne Defay / (France) / 17.47; 2 / B. Hamilton / (Hawaii) / 11.06	Heat 2: 1 / Carissa Moore / (Hawaii) / 19.04; 2 / B. Buitendag / (South Africa) / 16.60

== Final ==
Heat 1
1	Johanne Defay	(France)	17.10
2	Carissa Moore	(Hawaii)	10.70
