= Roxy Pro Gold Coast 2016 =

Quiksilver Pro Gold Coast at the Surf
- Location: Gold Coast (AUS)
- Dates: 10 to 21 March
- Competitors: 18 from 6 nations

Medalists
gold medal	Tyler Wright	Australia
silver medal	C.Conlogue	United States

The Quiksilver Pro Gold Coast 2016 was an event of the Association of Surfing Professionals for 2016 World Surf League.

This event was held from 10 to 21 March at Gold Coast, (Queensland, Australia) and contested by 36 surfers.

The tournament was won by Tyler Wright (AUS), who beat C.Conlogue (USA) in final.

== Round 1 ==
Heat 1
1	Tyler Wright	(Australia)	14.67
2	Johanne Defay	(France)	12.00
3	Alessa Quizon	(Hawaii)	9.27

Heat 2
1	Nikki Van Dijk	(Australia)	12.00
2	B. Buitendag	(South Africa)	8.47
3	Coco Ho	(Hawaii)	6.13

Heat 3
1	Carissa Moore	(Hawaii)	14.83
2	Chelsea Tuach	(Barbados)	11.13
3	Isabella Nichols	(Australia)	9.67

Heat 4
1	Sage Erickson	(United States)	13.60
2	Bronte Macaulay	(Australia)	12.23
3	C.Conlogue	(United States)	9.60

Heat 5
1	Malia Manuel	(Hawaii)	15.87
2	Sally Fitzgibbons	(Australia)	15.53
3	Laura Enever	(Australia)	7.93

Heat 6
1	Keely Andrew	(Australia)	12.50
2	S. Gilmore	(Australia)	12.43
3	T. Weston-Webb	(Hawaii)	7.06

== Round 2 ==
Heat 1: 1 / T. Weston-Webb / (Hawaii) / 12.56; 2 / Alessa Quizon / (Hawaii) / 12.40	Heat 2: 1 / S. Gilmore / (Australia) / 19.77; 2 / Coco Ho / (Hawaii) / 13.70	Heat 3: 1 / C.Conlogue / (United States) / 15.87; 2 / Isabella Nichols / (Australia) / 9.93

Heat 4: 1 / Bronte Macaulay / (Australia) / 16.50; 2 / Sally Fitzgibbons / (Australia) / 14.94	Heat 5: 1 / B. Buitendag / (South Africa) / 11.87; 2 / Laura Enever / (Australia) / 11.50	Heat 6: 1 / Johanne Defay / (France) / 16.33; 2 / Chelsea Tuach / (Barbados) / 10.87

== Round 3 ==
Heat 1
1	Tyler Wright	(Australia)	17.24
2	S. Gilmore	(Australia)	16.30
3	Bronte Macaulay	(Australia)	10.70

Heat 2
1	Carissa Moore	(Hawaii)	17.03
2	Malia Manuel	(Hawaii)	14.43
3	Nikki Van Dijk	(Australia)	13.00

Heat 3
1	C.Conlogue	(United States)	14.04
2	Sage Erickson	(United States)	11.76
3	Johanne Defay	(France)	10.97

Heat 4
1	T. Weston-Webb	(Hawaii)	13.27
2	B. Buitendag	(South Africa)	12.73
3	Keely Andrew	(Australia)	12.40

== Round 4 ==
Heat 1: 1 / S. Gilmore / (Australia) / 15.43; 2 / Nikki Van Dijk / (Australia) / 15.24	Heat 2: 1 / Malia Manuel / (Hawaii) / 18.03; 2 / Bronte Macaulay / (Australia) / 16.66	Heat 3: 1 / Sage Erickson / (United States) / 12.90; 2 / Keely Andrew / (Australia) / 9.57	Heat 4: 1 / Johanne Defay / (France) / 15.50; 2 / B. Buitendag / (South Africa) / 8.93

== Quarter finals ==
Heat 1: 1 / Tyler Wright / (Australia) / 15.10; 2 / S. Gilmore / (Australia) / 13.83	Heat 2: 1 / Carissa Moore / (Hawaii) / 12.90; 2 / Malia Manuel / (Hawaii) / 9.57	Heat 3: 1 / C.Conlogue / (United States) / 15.17; 2 / Sage Erickson / (United States) / 10.00	Heat 4: 1 / Johanne Defay / (France) / 12.50; 2 / T. Weston-Webb / (Hawaii) / 9.54

== Semi finals ==
Heat 1: 1 / Tyler Wright / (Australia) / 14.17; 2 / Carissa Moore / (Hawaii) / 14.00	Heat 2: 1 / C.Conlogue / (United States) / 15.27; 2 / Johanne Defay / (France) / 10.50

== Final ==
Heat 1
1	Tyler Wright	(Australia)	14.67
2	C.Conlogue	(United States)	10.94
