= Rip Curl Pro 2016 (Woman) =

Rip Curl Pro 2016 (Woman) at the Surf
- Location: Gold Coast (AUS)
- Dates: 24 March to 5 April
- Competitors: 18 from 6 nations

Medalists
gold medal	C.Conlogue	United States
silver medal	Sally Fitzgibbons	Australia

The Rip Curl Pro 2016 (Woman) 2016 was an event of the Association of Surfing Professionals for 2016 World Surf League.

This event was held from 24 March to 7 April at Bells Beach, (Victoria, Australia) and contested by 36 surfers.

The tournament was won by C.Conlogue (USA), who beat Sally Fitzgibbons (AUS) in final.

== Round 1 ==
Heat 1
1	B. Buitendag	(South Africa)	13.00
2	S. Gilmore	(Australia)	12.83
3	Chelsea Tuach	(Barbados)	6.10

Heat 2
1	Malia Manuel	(Hawaii)	13.34
2	Sally Fitzgibbons	(Australia)	11.50
3	Alessa Quizon	(Hawaii)	11.34

Heat 3
1	Carissa Moore	(Hawaii)	15.10
2	Brisa Hennessy	(Hawaii)	10.20
3	Keely Andrew	(Australia)	9.76

Heat 4
1	C.Conlogue	(United States)	16.17
2	Laura Enever	(Australia)	11.67
3	Nikki Van Dijk	(Australia)	7.30

Heat 5
1	Tyler Wright	(Australia)	15.43
2	Coco Ho	(Hawaii)	14.20
3	Sage Erickson	(United States)	7.76

Heat 6
1	Johanne Defay	(France)	14.33
2	T. Weston-Webb	(Hawaii)	13.30
3	Bronte Macaulay	(Australia)	9.17

== Round 2 ==
Heat 1: 1 / Nikki Van Dijk / (Australia) / 13.60; 2 / Chelsea Tuach / (Barbados) / 7.00	Heat 2: 1 / Alessa Quizon / (Hawaii) / 10.67; 2 / Sage Erickson / (United States) / 10.50	Heat 3: 1 / Sally Fitzgibbons / (Australia) / 12.67; 2 / Brisa Hennessy / (Hawaii) / 8.73

Heat 4: 1 / S. Gilmore / (Australia) / 12.10; 2 / Laura Enever / (Australia) / 10.50	Heat 5: 1 / T. Weston-Webb / (Hawaii) / 14.00; 2 / Coco Ho / (Hawaii) / 11.83	Heat 6: 1 / Bronte Macaulay / (Australia) / 11.57; 2 / Keely Andrew / (Australia) / 11.50

== Round 3 ==
Heat 1
1	Sally Fitzgibbons	(Australia)	11.66
2	Alessa Quizon	(Hawaii)	10.40
3	S. Gilmore	(Australia)	4.77

Heat 2
1	Carissa Moore	(Hawaii)	15.27
2	Malia Manuel	(Hawaii)	8.60
3	B. Buitendag	(South Africa)	6.30

Heat 3
1	C.Conlogue	(United States)	14.50
2	Nikki Van Dijk	(Australia)	11.10
3	T. Weston-Webb	(Hawaii)	6.76

Heat 4
1	Johanne Defay	(France)	7.10
2	Bronte Macaulay	(Australia)	6.36
3	Tyler Wright	(Australia)	4.83

== Round 4 ==
Heat 1: 1 / Alessa Quizon / (Hawaii) / 15.67; 2 / B. Buitendag / (South Africa) / 14.97	Heat 2: 1 / S. Gilmore / (Australia) / 15.87; 2 / Malia Manuel / (Hawaii) / 15.60	Heat 3: 1 / Tyler Wright / (Australia) / 14.44; 2 / Nikki Van Dijk / (Australia) / 14.27	Heat 4: 1 / T. Weston-Webb / (Hawaii) / 16.93; 2 / Bronte Macaulay / (Australia) / 11.10

== Quarter finals ==
Heat 1: 1 / Sally Fitzgibbons / (Australia) / 15.60; 2 / Alessa Quizon / (Hawaii) / 13.33	Heat 2: 1 / Carissa Moore / (Hawaii) / 19.23; 2 / S. Gilmore / (Australia) / 13.26	Heat 3: 1 / C.Conlogue / (United States) / 15.00; 2 / Tyler Wright / (Australia) / 13.13	Heat 4: 1 / T. Weston-Webb / (Hawaii) / 12.67; 2 / Johanne Defay / (France) / 11.67

== Semi finals ==
Heat 1: 1 / Sally Fitzgibbons / (Australia) / 16.16; 2 / Carissa Moore / (Hawaii) / 15.37	Heat 2: 1 / C.Conlogue / (United States) / 16.83; 2 / T. Weston-Webb / (Hawaii) / 15.67

== Final ==
Heat 1
1	C.Conlogue	(United States)	16.53
2	Sally Fitzgibbons	(Australia)	16.43
