= 2016 World Surf League =

Professional surfing league season

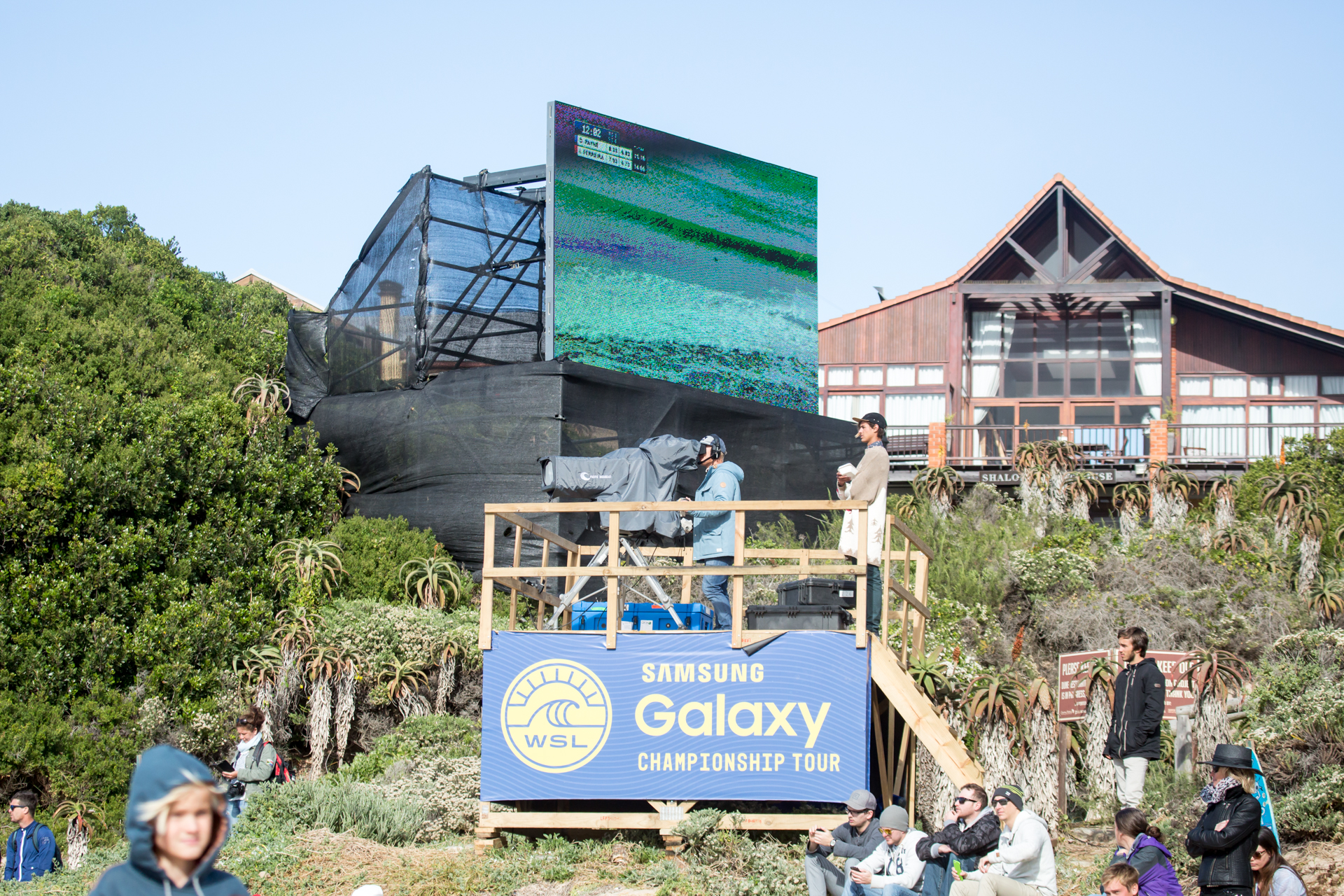
- Location: International
- Dates: late February to mid-December 2016

Champions
- Men: (Hawaii) John John Florence
- Women: (Australia) Tyler Wright

The 2016 World Surf League World Championship Tour (WCT) is a professional competitive surfing league run by the World Surf League. Men and women compete in separate tours with events taking place from late February to mid-December, at various surfing locations around the world. Surfers receive points for their best events. The surfer with the most points at the end of the tour (after discarding their two worst results) is announced the 2016 World Surf League Surfing World Champion.

== 2016 Men's Championship Tour ==
=== Event results ===
Round	Event	Men's champion	Men's runner-up
1	(Australia) Quiksilver Pro Gold Coast	(Australia) Matt Wilkinson	(United States) Kolohe Andino
2	(Australia) Rip Curl Pro Bells Beach	(Australia) Matt Wilkinson	(South Africa) Jordy Smith
3	(Australia) Drug Aware Margaret River Pro	(Hawaii) Sebastian Zietz	(Australia) Julian Wilson
4	(Brazil) Oi Rio Pro	(Hawaii) John John Florence	(Australia) Jack Freestone
5	Fiji Pro	(Brazil) Gabriel Medina	(Australia) Matt Wilkinson
6	(South Africa) J-Bay Open	(Australia) Mick Fanning	(Hawaii) John John Florence
7	(French Polynesia) Billabong Pro Tahiti	(United States) Kelly Slater	(Hawaii) John John Florence
8	(United States) Hurley Pro at Trestles	(South Africa) Jordy Smith	(Australia) Joel Parkinson
9	Quiksilver Pro France	(Hawaii) Keanu Asing	(Brazil) Gabriel Medina
10	MEO Rip Curl Pro Portugal	(Hawaii) John John Florence	(United States) Conner Coffin
11	(Hawaii) Billabong Pipe Masters	(French Polynesia) Michel Bourez	(Japan) Kanoa Igarashi

=== 2016 Men's Championship Tour Jeep Leaderboard ===
Points are awarded using the following structure:

Position	1st	2nd	3rd	5th	9th	13th	25th	INJ	DNC
Points	10,000	8,000	6,500	5,200	4,000	1,750	500	500	0

Ranking	+/-	Surfer	(Australia) WCT 1 (Details)	(Australia) WCT 2 (Details)	(Australia) WCT 3 (Details)	(Brazil) WCT 4 (Details)	(Fiji) WCT 5 (Details)	(South Africa) WCT 6 (Details)	(French Polynesia) WCT 7 (Details)	(United States) WCT 8 (Details)	(France) WCT 9 (Details)	(Portugal) WCT 10 (Details)	(Hawaii) WCT 11 (Details)	Points
1	Steady	John John Florence (HAW)	5th	13th	13th	1st	5th	2nd	2nd	13th	3rd	1st	5th	59.850
2	Steady	Jordy Smith (ZAF)	25th	2nd	9th	13th	13th	5th	9th	1st	25th	3rd	5th	46.400
3	Steady	Gabriel Medina (BRA)	13th	13th	9th	3rd	1st	5th	3rd	13th	2nd	13th	13th	45.450
4	Steady	Kolohe Andino (USA)	2nd	25th	5th	25th	25th	13th	5th	9th	3rd	3rd	3rd	44.150
5	Steady	Matt Wilkinson (AUS)	1st	1st	9th	25th	2nd	13th	13th	25th	13th	25th	13th	39.500
6	Steady	Michel Bourez (PYF)	13th	5th	13th	9th	9th	9th	25th	9th	25th	9th	1st	38.700
7	Steady	Kelly Slater (USA)	25th	13th	25th	DNC	3rd	5th	1st	5th	25th	13th	3rd	37.900
8	Steady	Julian Wilson (AUS)	25th	9th	2nd	25th	25th	3rd	5th	25th	5th	5th	13th	36.850
9	Steady	Joel Parkinson (AUS)	5th	13th	3rd	INJ	INJ	13th	9th	2nd	25th	9th	9th	35.700
10	Steady	Filipe Toledo (BRA)	3rd	INJ	INJ	9th	13th	5th	25th	3rd	5th	13th	9th	35.400
11	Steady	Adriano de Souza (BRA)	5th	13th	13th	3rd	5th	9th	25th	25th	9th	5th	13th	35.350
12	Steady	Sebastian Zietz (HAW)	9th	13th	1st	13th	25th	13th	13th	25th	9th	5th	13th	31.950
13	Steady	Josh Kerr (AUS)	13th	25th	13th	25th	9th	3rd	5th	9th	25th	13th	5th	30.650
14	Steady	Adrian Buchan (AUS)	5th	13th	9th	25th	3rd	13th	3rd	13th	13th	25th	25th	29.700
15	Steady	Italo Ferreira (BRA)	13th	3rd	3rd	9th	13th	13th	13th	13th	13th	13th	13th	27.500
16	Steady	Caio Ibelli (BRA)	9th	9th	5th	9th	25th	13th	25th	13th	9th	13th	25th	26.950
17	Steady	Mick Fanning (AUS)	13th	3rd	DNC	DNC	5th	1st	DNC	13th	DNC	DNC	DNC	25.200
17	Steady	Conner Coffin (USA)	9th	5th	25th	25th	13th	25th	25th	13th	13th	2nd	13th	25.200
19	Steady	Stuart Kennedy (AUS)	3rd	13th	25th	13th	25th	25th	25th	5th	9th	9th	25th	24.700
20	Steady	Kanoa Igarashi (JAP)	9th	13th	13th	13th	13th	13th	13th	13th	13th	13th	2nd	24.250
21	Steady	Wiggolly Dantas (BRA)	13th	5th	13th	25th	5th	9th	25th	13th	25th	13th	13th	23.650
22	Steady	Miguel Pupo (BRA)	25th	13th	13th	5th	13th	13th	25th	13th	13th	5th	13th	22.650
23	Steady	Nat Young (USA)	13th	5th	5th	13th	25th	25th	13th	25th	13th	25th	9th	22.400
24	Steady	Keanu Asing (HAW)	25th	25th	25th	25th	13th	25th	9th	25th	1st	25th	25th	18.750
25	Steady	Jérémy Florès (FRA)	13th	25th	13th	25th	13th	25th	13th	25th	25th	9th	5th	17.700
26	Steady	Jadson André (BRA)	13th	25th	INJ	25th	9th	25th	9th	9th	25th	13th	25th	17.500
27	Steady	Dusty Payne (HAW)	–	13th	25th	5th	9th	13th	13th	–	25th	25th	–	15.950
28	Steady	Matt Banting (AUS)	25th	25th	13th	13th	13th	25th	13th	25th	5th	13th	INJ	15.450
28	Steady	Kai Otton (AUS)	25th	13th	25th	DNC	25th	25th	13th	13th	5th	13th	13th	15.450
30	Steady	Davey Cathels (AUS)	25th	9th	25th	5th	25th	13th	25th	25th	13th	25th	25th	15.200
31	Steady	Jack Freestone (AUS)	25th	INJ	INJ	2nd	25th	25th	25th	13th	13th	25th	25th	14.500
32	Steady	Alejo Muniz (BRA)	INJ	INJ	13th	13th	13th	9th	13th	25th	13th	25th	INJ	14.250
33	Steady	Adam Melling (AUS)	25th	25th	13th	5th	13th	13th	13th	25th	25th	25th	25th	14.200
34	Steady	Ryan Callinan (AUS)	13th	25th	25th	13th	25th	25th	25th	25th	13th	25th	9th	11.750
35	Steady	Alex (BRA)	25th	25th	25th	25th	25th	25th	13th	5th	25th	25th	13th	11.700
36	Steady	Leonardo Fioravanti (ITA)	–	–	5th	13th	–	–	–	–	13th	–	–	8.700
37	Steady	Tanner Gudauskas (USA)	–	–	–	–	–	–	–	3rd	–	–	–	6.500
38	Steady	Taj Burrow (AUS)	13th	25th	13th	DNC	13th	DNC	DNC	DNC	DNC	DNC	DNC	5.750
38	Steady	Bede Durbidge (AUS)	INJ	INJ	INJ	INJ	INJ	INJ	INJ	INJ	INJ	INJ	13th	5.750
40	Steady	Bruno Santos (BRA)	–	–	–	–	–	–	5th	–	–	–	–	5.200
40	Steady	Brett Simpson (USA)	–	–	–	–	–	–	–	5th	–	–	–	5.200
42	Steady	Owen Wright (AUS)	INJ	INJ	INJ	INJ	INJ	INJ	INJ	INJ	INJ	INJ	INJ	4.500
43	Steady	Mason Ho (HAW)	–	9th	–	–	–	–	–	–	–	–	–	4.000
44	Steady	Frederico Morais (PRT)	–	–	–	–	–	–	–	–	–	13th	25th	2.250
45	Steady	Mikey Wright (AUS)	13th	–	–	–	–	–	–	–	–	–	–	1.750
45	Steady	Deivid Silva (BRA)	–	–	–	13th	–	–	–	–	–	–	–	1.750
45	Steady	Lucas Silveira (BRA)	–	–	–	13th	–	–	–	–	–	–	–	1.750
45	Steady	Marco Fernandez (BRA)	–	–	–	13th	–	–	–	–	–	–	–	1.750
49	Steady	Wade Carmichael (AUS)	25th	–	–	–	–	–	–	–	–	–	–	500
49	Steady	Timothee Bisso (GLP)	–	25th	–	–	–	–	–	–	–	–	–	500
49	Steady	Tim Stevenson (AUS)	–	25th	–	–	–	–	–	–	–	–	–	500
49	Steady	Jack Robinson (AUS)	–	–	25th	–	–	–	–	–	–	–	–	500
49	Steady	Jacob Willcox (AUS)	–	–	25th	–	–	–	–	–	–	–	–	500
49	Steady	Jay Davies (AUS)	–	–	25th	–	–	–	–	–	–	–	–	500
49	Steady	Bino Lopes (BRA)	–	–	–	25th	–	–	–	–	–	–	–	500
49	Steady	Tevita Gukilau (FJI)	–	–	–	–	25th	–	–	–	–	–	–	500
49	Steady	Steven Sawyer (ZAF)	–	–	–	–	–	25th	–	–	–	–	–	500
49	Steady	Hira Teriinatoofa (PYF)	–	–	–	–	–	–	25th	–	–	–	–	500
49	Steady	Joan Duru (FRA)	–	–	–	–	–	–	–	–	25th	–	–	500
49	Steady	Miguel Blanco (PRT)	–	–	–	–	–	–	–	–	–	25th	–	500
49	Steady	Finn McGill (HAW)	–	–	–	–	–	–	–	–	–	–	25th	500
49	Steady	Bruce Irons (HAW)	–	–	–	–	–	–	–	–	–	–	25th	500
49	Steady	Gavin Beschen (HAW)	–	–	–	–	–	–	–	–	–	–	25th	500

- Championship Tour surfers best 9 of 11 results are combined to equal their final point total.
- Tournament results discarded

Legend

Champion
WQS 2017
two worst results

== 2016 Women's Championship Tour ==
=== Event results ===
Round	Event	Women's champion	Women's runner-up
1	(Australia) Roxy Pro Gold Coast	(Australia) Tyler Wright	(United States) Courtney Conlogue
2	(Australia) Rip Curl Women's Pro Bells Beach	(United States) Courtney Conlogue	(Australia) Sally Fitzgibbons
3	(Australia) Drug Aware Margaret River Pro	(Australia) Tyler Wright	(United States) Courtney Conlogue
4	(Brazil) Oi Rio Women's Pro	(Australia) Tyler Wright	(Australia) Sally Fitzgibbons
5	Fiji Women's Pro	(France) Johanne Defay	(Hawaii) Carissa Moore
6	(United States) Vans US Open of Surfing	(Hawaii) Tatiana Weston-Webb	(Hawaii) Malia Manuel
7	(United States) Swatch Women's Pro	(Australia) Tyler Wright	(Australia) Stephanie Gilmore
8	(Portugal) Cascais Women's Pro	(United States) Courtney Conlogue	(Australia) Tyler Wright
9	Roxy Pro France	(Hawaii) Carissa Moore	(Australia) Tyler Wright
10	(Hawaii) Maui Women's Pro	(Australia) Tyler Wright	(Hawaii) Carissa Moore

=== 2016 Women's Championship Tour Jeep Leaderboard ===
Points are awarded using the following structure:

Position	1st	2nd	3rd	5th	9th	13th	INJ	DNC
Points	10,000	8,000	6,500	5,200	3,300	1,750	1,750	0

Ranking	+/-	Surfer	WCT 1 (Details)	WCT 2 (Details)	WCT 3 (Details)	WCT 4 (Details)	WCT 5 (Details)	WCT 6 (Details)	WCT 7 (Details)	WCT 8 (Details)	WCT 9 (Details)	WCT 10 (Details)	Points
1	Steady	Tyler Wright (AUS)	1st	5th	1st	1st	13th	3rd	1st	2nd	2nd	1st	72.500
2	Steady	Courtney Conlogue (USA)	2nd	1st	2nd	3rd	5th	5th	9th	1st	3rd	3rd	60.700
3	Steady	Carissa Moore (HAW)	3rd	3rd	3rd	3rd	2nd	9th	5th	5th	1st	2nd	57.200
4	Steady	Tatiana Weston-Webb (HAW)	5th	3rd	3rd	5th	13th	1st	9th	5th	3rd	5th	50.300
4	Steady	Johanne Defay (FRA)	3rd	5th	13th	5th	1st	13th	5th	3rd	9th	13th	43.650
6	Steady	Stephanie Gilmore (AUS)	5th	5th	5th	5th	9th	5th	2nd	INJ	5th	9th	42.500
7	Steady	Malia Manuel (HAW)	5th	9th	9th	5th	9th	2nd	5th	5th	13th	5th	40.600
8	Steady	Sally Fitzgibbons (AUS)	13th	2nd	5th	2nd	5th	9th	13th	9th	9th	13th	38.050
9	Steady	Sage Erickson (USA)	5th	13th	9th	9th	9th	5th	3rd	5th	5th	13th	37.200
10	Steady	Laura Enever (AUS)	13th	13th	5th	9th	5th	9th	5th	9th	5th	13th	32.450
11	Steady	Nikki Van Dijk (AUS)	9th	9th	9th	13th	5th	13th	3rd	13th	5th	13th	30.300
12	Steady	Bianca Buitendag (ZAF)	9th	9th	5th	13th	3rd	13th	13th	13th	13th	5th	28.750
13	Steady	Coco Ho (HAW)	13th	13th	13th	13th	9th	9th	9th	3rd	9th	5th	28.400
14	Steady	Keely Andrew (AUS)	9th	13th	13th	9th	13th	5th	9th	13th	13th	3rd	26.850
15	Steady	Alessa Quizon (HAW)	13th	5th	13th	13th	13th	13th	13th	9th	9th	9th	22.100
16	Steady	Lakey Peterson (USA)	INJ	INJ	INJ	INJ	INJ	3rd	13th	9th	13th	9th	21.850
17	Steady	Bronte Macaulay (AUS)	9th	9th	9th	9th	13th	–	–	–	13th	–	16.700
18	Steady	Chelsea Tuach (BRB)	13th	13th	13th	13th	13th	13th	13th	13th	13th	13th	14.000
19	Steady	Bethany Hamilton (HAW)	–	–	–	–	3rd	–	13th	–	–	–	8.250
20	Steady	Brisa Hennessy (CRC)	–	13th	–	–	–	–	–	–	–	9th	5.050
21	Steady	Isabella Nichols (AUS)	13th	–	–	–	–	–	–	–	–	–	1.750
21	Steady	Felicity Palmateer (AUS)	–	–	13th	–	–	–	–	–	–	–	1.750
21	Steady	Silvana Lima (BRA)	–	–	–	13th	–	–	–	–	–	–	1.750
21	Steady	Meah Collins (USA)	–	–	–	–	–	13th	–	–	–	–	1.750
21	Steady	Teresa Bonvalot (PRT)	–	–	–	–	–	–	–	13th	–	–	1.750
21	Steady	Pauline Ado (FRA)	–	–	–	–	–	–	–	13th	–	–	1.750

- Championship Tour surfers best 8 of 10 results are combined to equal their final point total.
- Tournament results discarded

Legend

Champion
WQS 2017
two worst results

== Qualifying Series ==
=== MQS ===
Position	1st	2nd	3rd–4th	5th–8th	9th

Ranking	+/-	Surfer	Events					Points
Ranking	+/-	Surfer	1	2	3	4	5	Points
1	Steady	Connor O'Leary (AUS)	10.000	5.300	3.700	2.650	2.375	24.025
2	Steady	Ethan Ewing (AUS)	8.000	5.200	3.600	3.600	3.000	23.400
3	Steady	Frederico Morais (PRT)	8.000	8.000	3.000	2.650	1.260	22.910
4	Steady	Joan Duru (FRA)	8.000	5.200	5.100	2.650	1.550	22.500
5	Steady	Kanoa Igarashi (JPN)	6.500	6.000	6.000	2.200	1.100	21.800
6	Steady	Leonardo Fioravanti (ITA)	4.500	4.500	4.500	3.700	3.600	20.800
7	Steady	Jérémy Florès (FRA)	8.000	6.500	2.300	2.300	1.550	20.650
8	Steady	Jadson André (BRA)	5.300	5.100	4.500	3.700	1.100	19.700
9	Steady	Ian Gouveia (BRA)	6.500	6.000	3.100	2.300	1.550	19.450
10	Steady	Jack Freestone (AUS)	5.300	5.200	5.200	2.100	1.000	18.800
11	Steady	Ezekiel Lau (HAW)	6.500	5.100	4.500	1.550	1.100	18.750
12	Steady	Bino Lopes (BRA)	6.500	5.200	3.700	1.500	1.100	18.000
13	Steady	Jesse Mendes (BRA)	10.000	3.800	1.550	1.260	1.100	17.710
14	Steady	Tanner Gudauskus (USA)	6.300	5.200	3.550	1.550	1.100	17.700

Legend

WCT 2017

=== WQS ===
Position	1st	2nd	3rd–4th	5th–8th	9th

Ranking	+/-	Surfer	Events					Points
Ranking	+/-	Surfer	1	2	3	4	5	Points
1	Steady	Silvana Lima (BRA)	6.000	3.550	3.550	3.000	2.650	18.750
2	Steady	Nikki Van Dijk (AUS)	6.000	3.550	2.650	2.650	1.550	16.400
2	Steady	Bronte Macaulay (AUS)	6.000	3.550	2.650	2.650	1.550	16.400
2	Steady	Keely Andrew (AUS)	6.000	3.550	2.650	2.650	1.550	16.400
5	Steady	Malia Manuel (HAW)	4.500	4.500	3.550	2.650	1.050	16.250
6	Steady	Coco Ho (HAW)	6.000	2.650	2.650	2.250	1.050	14.600
7	Steady	Sage Erickson (USA)	6.000	2.650	2.650	1.550	1.550	14.400
8	Steady	Pauline Ado (FRA)	4.500	2.650	2.250	1.680	1.550	12.630
9	Steady	Alessa Quizon (HAW)	4.500	2.650	1.680	1.550	1.550	11.930
10	Steady	Laura Enever (AUS)	3.550	3.550	1.550	1.550	1.050	11.250

Legend

WCT 2017
