= Margaret River Pro 2017 (women) =

Margaret River Pro 2017 (Woman) at the Surf
- Location: Margaret River (AUS)
- Dates: 24 March to 5 April
- Competitors: 18 from 6 nations

Medalists
gold medal	Sally Fitzgibbons	Australia
silver medal	Tyler Wright	Australia

The Margaret River Pro 2017 is an event of the Association of Surfing Professionals for the 2017 World Surf League.

This event was held from 29 march to 9 April at Margaret River, (Western Australia, Australia) and contested by 18 surfers.

== Round 1 ==
Heat 1
1	Malia Manuel	(Hawaii)	12.93
2	Johanne Defay	(France)	8.50
3	Bronte Macaulay	(Australia)	2.97

Heat 2
1	C.Conlogue	(United States)	10.66
2	Sage Erickson	(United States)	10.07
3	Coco Ho	(Hawaii)	4.57

Heat 3
1	Tyler Wright	(Australia)	16.34
2	Laura Macaulay	(Australia)	11.34
3	Keely Andrew	(Australia)	7.83

Heat 4
1	S. Gilmore	(Australia)	14.10
2	Bianca Buitendag	(South Africa)	6.50
3	Nikki Van Dijk	(Australia)	5.00

Heat 5
1	Carissa Moore	(Hawaii)	11.60
2	Lakey Peterson	(United States)	8.90
3	Pauline Ado	(France)	4.53

Heat 6
1	Sally Fitzgibbons	(Australia)	12.83
2	Silvana Lima	(Brazil)	11.17
3	T. Weston-Webb	(Hawaii)	5.87

== Round 2 ==
Heat 1: 1 / Nikki Van Dijk / (Australia) / 13.84; 2 / Bronte Macaulay / (Australia) / 12.83	Heat 2: 1 / Coco Ho / (Hawaii) / 13.10; 2 / Lakey Peterson / (United States) / 7.50	Heat 3: 1 / Johanne Defay / (France) / 15.27; 2 / Laura Macaulay / 7.67

Heat 4: 1 / T. Weston-Webb / (Hawaii) / 15.17; 2 / Bianca Buitendag / (South Africa) / 9.66	Heat 5: 1 / Sage Erickson / (United States) / 14.67; 2 / Pauline Ado / (France) / 11.87	Heat 6: 1 / Keely Andrew / (Australia) / 12.66; 2 / Silvana Lima / (Brazil) / 7.96

== Round 3 ==
Heat 1
1	C. Conlogue	(United States)	15.70
2	Coco Ho	(Hawaii)	12.77
3	Johanne Defay	(France)	9.90

Heat 2
1	Tyler Wright	(Australia)	17.94
2	Malia Manuel	(Hawaii)	17.00
3	Sage Erickson	(United States)	11.94

Heat 3
1	S. Gilmore	(Australia)	14.67
2	Nikki Van Dijk	(Australia)	13.77
3	T. Weston-Webb	(Hawaii)	12.70

Heat 4
1	Carissa Moore	(Hawaii)	17.47
2	Sally Fitzgibbons	(Australia)	13.53
3	Keely Andrew	(Australia)	10.27

== Round 4 ==
Heat 1: 1 / Sage Erickson / (United States) / 14.76; 2 / Coco Ho / (Hawaii) / 10.83	Heat 2: 1 / Malia Manuel / (Hawaii) / 13.67; 2 / Johanne Defay / (France) / 9.57	Heat 3: 1 / Nikki Van Dijk / (Australia) / 14.83; 2 / Keely Andrew / (Australia) / 12.70	Heat 4: 1 / Sally Fitzgibbons / (Australia) / 16.94; 2 / T. Weston-Webb / (Hawaii) / 13.00

== Quarter finals ==
Heat 1: 1 / Sage Erickson / (United States) / 12.60; 2 / C. Conlogue / (United States) / 12.03	Heat 2: 1 / Tyler Wright / (Australia); 2 / Malia Manuel / (Hawaii) / INJ	Heat 3: 1 / Stephanie Gilmore / (Australia) / 12.50; 2 / Nikki Van Dijk / (Australia) / 11.83	Heat 4: 1 / Sally Fitzgibbons / (Australia) / 17.60; 2 / Carissa Moore / (Hawaii) / 15.90

== Semi finals ==
Heat 1: 1 / Tyler Wright / (Australia) / 16.00; 2 / Sage Erickson / (United States) / 12.17	Heat 2: 1 / Sally Fitzgibbons / (Australia) / 11.43; 2 / Stephanie Gilmore / (Australia) / 10.93

== Final ==
Heat 1
1	Sally Fitzgibbons	(Australia)	14.90
2	Tyler Wright	(Australia)	12.53
