= Oi Rio Pro 2016 (Woman) =

Surfing event

Surf
- Location: Rio de Janeiro (Brazil)
- Dates: 10 to 21 May
- Competitors: 18 from 6 nations

Medalists
| gold medal | Tyler Wright | Australia |
| silver medal | Sally Fitzgibbons | Australia |

The Rio Pro 2016 was an event of the Association of Surfing Professionals for 2015 ASP World Tour.

This event was held from 11 to 22 May at Rio de Janeiro, (Rio de Janeiro, Brazil) and opposed by 18 surfers.

The tournament was won by Tyler Wright (AUS), who beat Sally Fitzgibbons (AUS) in final.

== Round 1 ==
Heat 1
| 1 | Sally Fitzgibbons | (Australia) | 12.50 |
| 2 | Laura Enever | (Australia) | 11.06 |
| 3 | B. Buitendag | (South Africa) | 10.67 |

Heat 2
| 1 | Keely Andrew | (Australia) | 13.17 |
| 2 | T. Weston-Webb | (Hawaii) | 12.00 |
| 3 | Malia Manuel | (Hawaii) | 7.07 |

Heat 3
| 1 | C.Conlogue | (United States) | 14.76 |
| 2 | Bronte Macaulay | (Australia) | 6.10 |
| 3 | Silvana Lima | (Brazil) | 5.50 |

Heat 4
| 1 | Tyler Wright | (Australia) | 15.10 |
| 2 | Coco Ho | (Hawaii) | 9.10 |
| 3 | Nikki Van Dijk | (Australia) | 5.33 |

Heat 5
| 1 | Sage Erickson | (United States) | 12.40 |
| 2 | Carissa Moore | (Hawaii) | 9.50 |
| 3 | Chelsea Tuach | (Barbados) | 7.53 |

Heat 6
| 1 | S. Gilmore | (Australia) | 15.93 |
| 2 | Alessa Quizon | (Hawaii) | 10.33 |
| 3 | Johanne Defay | (France) | 9.17 |

== Round 2 ==
| Heat 1: 1 / Malia Manuel / (Hawaii) / 13.67; 2 / Alessa Quizon / (Hawaii) / 9.10 | Heat 2: 1 / Laura Enever / (Australia) / 13.17; 2 / B. Buitendag / (South Africa) / 13.00 | Heat 3: 1 / Carissa Moore / (Hawaii) / 15.00; 2 / Silvana Lima / (Brazil) / 13.73 |

| Heat 4: 1 / T. Weston-Webb / (Hawaii) / 11.80; 2 / Coco Ho / (Hawaii) / 9.64 | Heat 5: 1 / Johanne Defay / (France) / 17.66; 2 / Chelsea Tuach / (Barbados) / 8.10 | Heat 6: 1 / Bronte Macaulay / (Australia) / 11.67; 2 / Nikki Van Dijk / (Australia) / 11.60 |

== Round 3 ==
Heat 1
| 1 | Sally Fitzgibbons | (Australia) | 13.77 |
| 2 | Keely Andrew | (Australia) | 12.70 |
| 3 | T. Weston-Webb | (Hawaii) | 12.66 |

Heat 2
| 1 | C.Conlogue | (United States) | 13.50 |
| 2 | Sage Erickson | (United States) | 13.13 |
| 3 | Malia Manuel | (Hawaii) | 12.40 |

Heat 3
| 1 | Tyler Wright | (Australia) | 16.90 |
| 2 | Johanne Defay | (France) | 12.97 |
| 3 | Bronte Macaulay | (Australia) | 11.23 |

Heat 4
| 1 | S. Gilmore | (Australia) | 15.44 |
| 2 | Carissa Moore | (Hawaii) | 15.17 |
| 3 | Laura Enever | (Australia) | 10.00 |

== Round 4 ==
| Heat 1: 1 / Malia Manuel / (Hawaii) / 13.10; 2 / Keely Andrew / (Australia) / 11.50 | Heat 2: 1 / T. Weston-Webb / (Hawaii) / 13.24; 2 / Sage Erickson / (United States) / 13.00 | Heat 3: 1 / Johanne Defay / (France) / 8.70; 2 / Laura Enever / (Australia) / 6.53 | Heat 4: 1 / Carissa Moore / (Hawaii) / 11.84; 2 / Bronte Macaulay / (Australia) / 10.93 |

== Quarter finals ==
| Heat 1: 1 / Sally Fitzgibbons / (Australia) / 13.73; 2 / Malia Manuel / (Hawaii) / 13.30 | Heat 2: 1 / C.Conlogue / (United States) / 16.50; 2 / T. Weston-Webb / (Hawaii) / 11.10 | Heat 3: 1 / Tyler Wright / (Australia) / 14.87; 2 / Johanne Defay / (France) / 12.70 | Heat 4: 1 / Carissa Moore / (Hawaii) / 15.84; 2 / S. Gilmore / (Australia) / 7.50 |

== Semi finals ==
| Heat 1: 1 / Sally Fitzgibbons / (Australia) / 14.10; 2 / C.Conlogue / (United States) / 14.00 | Heat 2: 1 / Tyler Wright / (Australia) / 13.60; 2 / Carissa Moore / (Hawaii) / 10.10 |

== Final ==
Heat 1
| 1 | Tyler Wright | (Australia) | 13.10 |
| 2 | Sally Fitzgibbons | (Australia) | 10.34 |
