= Margaret River Pro 2019 (women) =

Margaret River Pro 2019 (Women) at the Surf
- Location: Margaret River (AUS)
- Dates: 29 May to 9 June
- Competitors: 18 from 6 nations

Medalists
gold medal	Lakey Peterson	United States
silver medal	Tatiana Weston-Webb	Brazil

The Margaret River Pro 2019 is an event of the Association of Surfing Professionals for the 2019 World Surf League.

This event was held from 29 May to 9 June at Margaret River, (Western Australia, Australia) and contested by 18 surfers.

== Seeding Round ==
Heat 1
1	Caroline Marks	(United States)	11.83
2	Paige Hareb	(New Zealand)	8.17
3	Johanne Defay	(France)	7.76

Heat 2
1	Carissa Moore	(Hawaii)	14.43
2	Keely Andrew	(Australia)	11.10
3	Nikki Van Dijk	(Australia)	8.93

Heat 3
1	Coco Ho	(Hawaii)	15.23
2	S. Gilmore	(Australia)	12.50
3	Mia McCarthy	(Australia)	8.06

Heat 4
1	C.Conlogue	(United States)	14.10
2	Brisa Hennessy	(Costa Rica)	10.47
3	Macy Callaghan	(Australia)	8.00

Heat 5
1	T. Weston-Webb	(Hawaii)	13.90
2	Sally Fitzgibbons	(Australia)	12.67
3	Silvana Lima	(Brazil)	7.44

Heat 6
1	Lakey Peterson	(United States)	13.16
2	Malia Manuel	(Hawaii)	9.26
3	Bronte Macaulay	(Australia)	-

== Elimination round ==
Heat 1
1	Johanne Defay	(France)	13.10
2	Silvana Lima	(Brazil)	12.40
3	Mia McCarthy	(Australia)	9.13

Heat 2
1	Nikki Van Dijk	(Hawaii)	12.40
2	Bronte Macaulay	(Australia)	11.00
3	Macy Callaghan	(Australia)	9.00

== Round of 16 ==
Heat 1: 1 / C. Conlogue / (United States) / 11.44; 2 / Silvana Lima / (Brazil) / 6.33	Heat 2: 1 / T. Weston-Webb / (Brazil) / 12.50; 2 / Coco Ho / (Hawaii) / 6.30	Heat 3: 1 / Caroline Marks / (United States) / 17.60; 2 / Paige Hareb / (New Zealand) / 11.10	Heat 4: 1 / Sally Fitzgibbons / (Australia) / 14.10; 2 / Johanne Defay / (France) / 9.20

Heat 5: 1 / Carissa Moore / (Hawaii) / 14.34; 2 / Keely Andrew / (Australia) / 8.17	Heat 6: 1 / Brisa Hennessy / (Costa Rica) / 12.00; 2 / Malia Manuel / (Hawaii) / 3.66	Heat 7: 1 / S. Gilmore / (Australia) / 10.57; 2 / Bronte Macaulay / (Australia) / 6.00	Heat 8: 1 / Lakey Peterson / (United States) / 15.17; 2 / Nikki Van Dijk / (Australia) / 10.13

== Quarter finals ==
Heat 1: 1 / T. Weston-Webb / (Brazil) / 14.26; 2 / C. Conlogue / (United States) / 13.10	Heat 2: 1 / Sally Fitzgibbons / (Australia) / 15.50; 2 / Caroline Marks / (United States) / 14.40	Heat 3: 1 / Carissa Moore / (Hawaii) / 13.84; 2 / Brisa Hennessy / (Costa Rica) / 8.50	Heat 4: 1 / Lakey Peterson / (United States) / 18.83; 2 / Stephanie Gilmore / (Australia) / 12.16

== Semi finals ==
Heat 1: 1 / T. Weston-Webb / (Brazil) / 13.33; 2 / Sally Fitzgibbons / (Australia) / 11.67	Heat 2: 1 / Lakey Peterson / (United States) / 15.97; 2 / Carissa Moore / (Hawaii) / 15.80

== Final ==
Heat 1
1	Lakey Peterson	(United States)	13.33
2	T. Weston-Webb	(Brazil)	10.40
