= 2013 ASP World Tour =

Professional surfing league season

2013 World Surf League
- Location: International
- Dates: late February to mid-December 2015

Champions
- Men: (Australia) Mick Fanning
- Women: (Hawaii) Carissa Moore

The 2013 ASP World Tour is a professional competitive surfing league run by the Association of Surfing Professionals. Men and women compete in separate tours with events taking place from late February to mid-December, at various surfing locations around the world.

Surfers receive points for their best events. The surfer with the most points at the end of the tour is announced the ASP World Tour Champion.

For the 2013 season, the champions were Mick Fanning (men) and Carissa Moore (women).

== ASP World Championship Tour ==
=== Schedule ===
Date	Location	Country	Event	Winner	Runner-up	Prize money	Report
March 2–13	Gold Coast	Australia	Quiksilver Pro Gold Coast	Kelly Slater (USA)	Joel Parkinson (AUS)	$450,000	Report
March 27 – April 7	Bells Beach	Australia	Rip Curl Pro	Adriano De Souza (BRA)	Nat Young (USA)	$450,000	Report
May 8–19	Rio de Janeiro	Brazil	Billabong Rio Pro	Jordy Smith (RSA)	Adriano De Souza (BRA)	$500,000	Report
June 2–14	Tavarua	Fiji	Volcom Pro Fiji	Kelly Slater (USA)	Mick Fanning (AUS)	$450,000	Report
June 18–29	Keramas, Bali	Indonesia	Oakley Pro Bali	Joel Parkinson (AUS)	Michel Bourez (PYF)	$450,000	
August 15–26	Teahupoo, Tahiti	French Polynesia	Billabong Pro Teahupoo	Adrian Buchan (AUS)	Kelly Slater (USA)	$450,000	Report
September 15–21	Trestles, California	United States	Hurley Pro	Taj Burrow (AUS)	Julian Wilson (AUS)	$450,000	Report
September 27 – October 7	Soorts-Hossegor	France	Quiksilver Pro France	Mick Fanning (AUS)	Gabriel Medina (BRA)	$450,000	Report
October 7–17	Peniche	Portugal	Rip Curl Pro Portugal	Kai Otton (AUS)	Nat Young (USA)	$450,000	Report
December 8–15	Banzai Pipeline, Hawaii	United States	Billabong Pipeline Masters	Kelly Slater (USA)	John John Florence (HAW)	$450,000	Report

=== Final 2013 Standings ===
Rank	Name	Country	Points
1	Mick Fanning	Australia	54,400
2	Kelly Slater	United States	54,150
3	Joel Parkinson	Australia	48,450
4	Jordy Smith	South Africa	43,150
5	Taj Burrow	Australia	42,900
6	Julian Wilson	Australia	40,950
7	Kai Otton	Australia	39,600
8	Nat Young	United States	38,000
9	Josh Kerr	Australia	36,100
10	John John Florence	Hawaii	35,150
11	C.J. Hobgood	United States	34,650
12	Michel Bourez	French Polynesia	33,000
13	Adriano de Souza	Brazil	31,750
14	Gabriel Medina	Brazil	25,000
15	Filipe Toledo	Brazil	24,400

Source:2013 Men's World Championship Tour

== ASP Women’s World Championship Tour ==
=== Event schedule ===
Date	Location	Country	Event	Winner	Runner-up	Prize Money	Report
March 2–13, 2013	Gold Coast	Australia	Roxy Pro Gold Coast	Tyler Wright (AUS)	Sally Fitzgibbons (AUS)	$120,000	Report
March 16–24, 2013	Margaret River	Australia	Drug Aware Margaret River Pro	Carissa Moore (HAW)	Tyler Wright (AUS)	$120,000	Report
March 27 – April 1, 2013	Bells Beach	Australia	Rip Curl Women's Pro	Carissa Moore (HAW)	Tyler Wright (AUS)	$120,000	Report
April 3–7, 2013	Taranaki	New Zealand	NZ Surf Festival	Courtney Conlogue (USA)	Coco Ho (HAW)	$120,000	Report
May 8–14, 2013	Rio de Janeiro	Brazil	Colgate Plax Girls Rio Pro	Tyler Wright (AUS)	Sally Fitzgibbons (AUS)	$120,000	Report
July 22–28, 2013	Huntington Beach	United States	U.S. Open of Surfing	Carissa Moore (HAW)	Courtney Conlogue (USA)	$120,000	Report
September 24–30, 2013	Soorts-Hossegor^{[1]}	France	Roxy Pro France	Sally Fitzgibbons (AUS)	Tyler Wright (AUS)	$120,000	
October 3–7, 2013	Cascais	Portugal	EDP Cascais Girls Pro	Carissa Moore (HAW)	Sally Fitzgibbons (AUS)	$120,000	

^{[1]} Roxy Pro was originally scheduled for July 10–14 in Biarritz, but due to poor surf it was cancelled. The event was rescheduled for September in Hossegor in conjunction with the Men's event

=== Final standings ===
Rank	Name	Country	Points
1	Carissa Moore	Hawaii	59,500
2	Tyler Wright	Australia	55,700
3	Sally Fitzgibbons	Australia	52,200
4	Courtney Conlogue	United States	45,300
5	Stephanie Gilmore	Australia	37,900
6	Coco Ho	Hawaii	36,900
7	Lakey Peterson	United States	35,400
8	Bianca Buitendag	South Africa	31,850
9	Pauline Ado	France	30,650
10	Laura Enever	Australia	25,900
