= Honolua =

Area in West Maui, Hawai'i, US

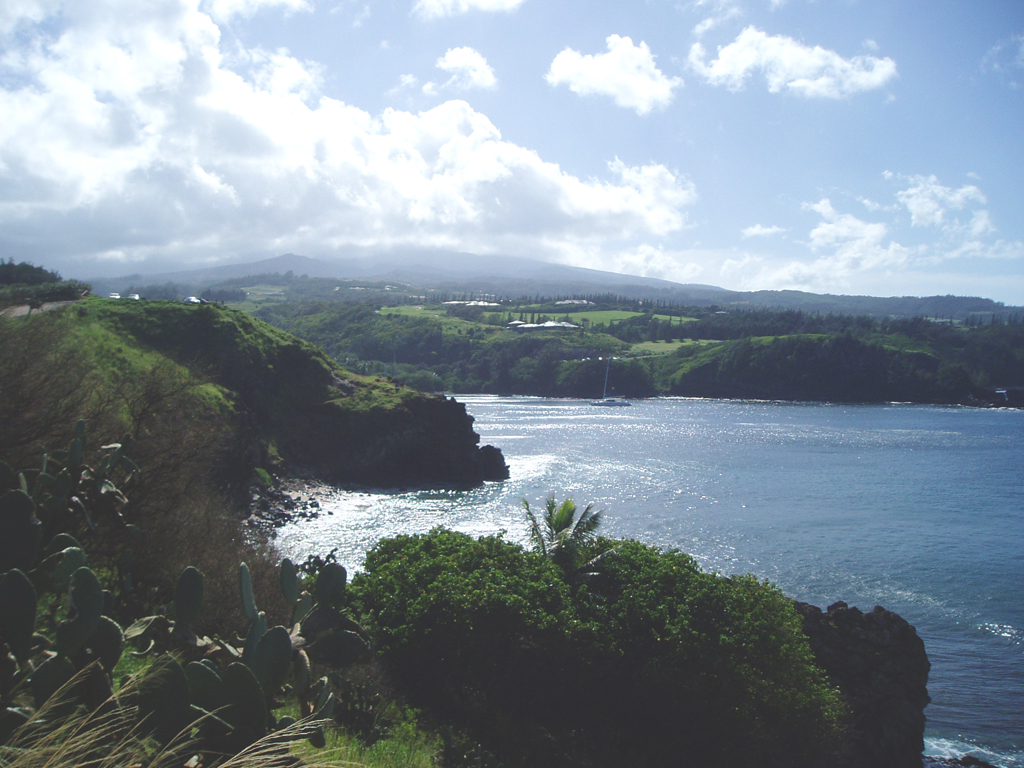
View of Honolua and Mokuleʻia Bay from Lipoa Point

Honolua Bay, Mokuleʻia Bay and Lipoa Point are part of an area known as the ahupuaʻa of Honolua, located just north of Kapalua, West Maui in Maui County, Hawaiʻi, United States. The area is a mix of agricultural and conservation land tended by the Maui Land & Pineapple Company in Lahaina, Hawaiʻi, including coastline management. Honolua Bay and Mokuleʻia Bay comprise the 45-acre (18 ha) Honolua-Mokuleʻia Marine Life Conservation District.

== Geography ==
Honolua is located along the west coast of Maui at 20°59′48″N 156°39′11″W (20.996739, -156.653073).

From Honolua you can view the islands of Molokai and Lanai. Honolua Bay is at the northern end of this area, 21°0′47″N 156°38′18″W. Any type of commercial activity without a permit from the Department of Land and Natural Resources OCCL division is illegal.

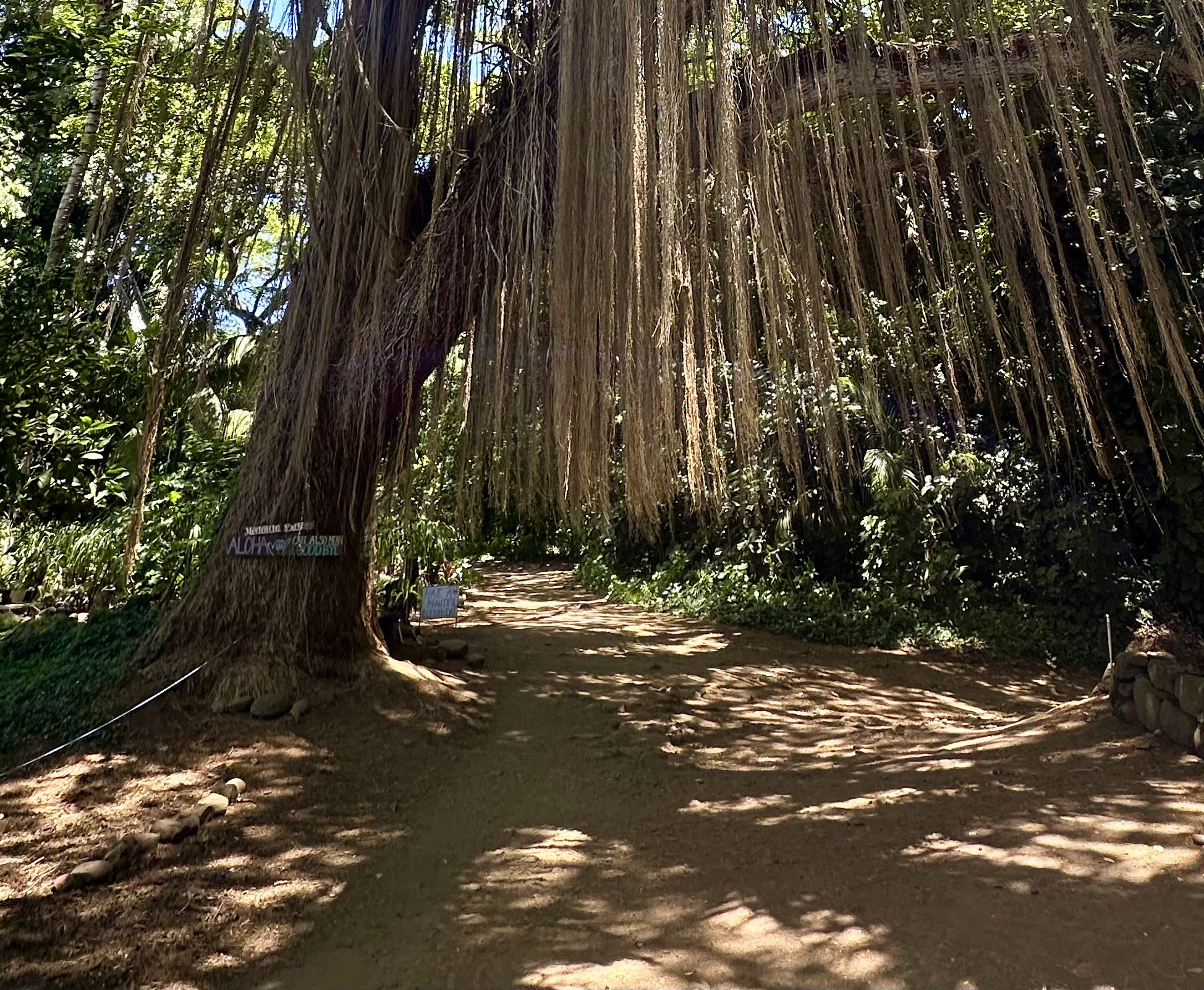
The trail to the Honolua Bay shoreline.

== Recreation and leisure ==
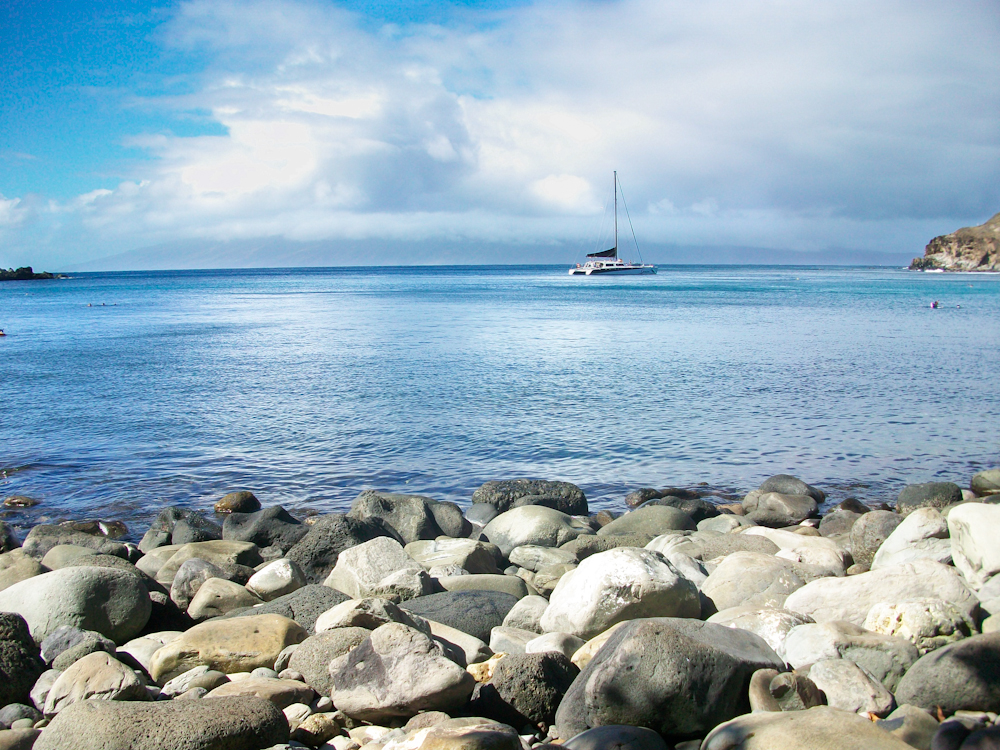
Honolua Bay, from the rocky shoreline

The coastline at Honolua and Mokuleʻia is rugged and is accessed by trail from a parking lot adjacent to the Honoapiilani Highway above. Mokuleʻia Bay is home to Slaughterhouse Beach, a sand beach with coral reefs. Honolua Bay consists of a rocky shoreline with small beach, coral reefs in a marine preserve and world-renowned surf break. Honolua Bay hosts the annual Billabong Pipe women's surf competition in December.
