= Roxy Pro France =

World Surf League France women's stage

- Current season, competition or edition: 2024 World Surf League
- Sport: Surfing
- Country: France
- Most recent champion: Brisa Hennessy (2021)
- Most titles: Layne Beachley (4)
- Website: WSL Roxy Pro France

The Roxy Pro France is a women's surfing event in the Landes (department) in Nouvelle-Aquitaine, in the South West of France. The tour stop will be held in the area of Landes de Gascogne (Landes forest). The event on the Women's World Championship Tour is hosted by World Surf League as part of one of the Atlantic Europe stops on a world tour.

== Winners ==
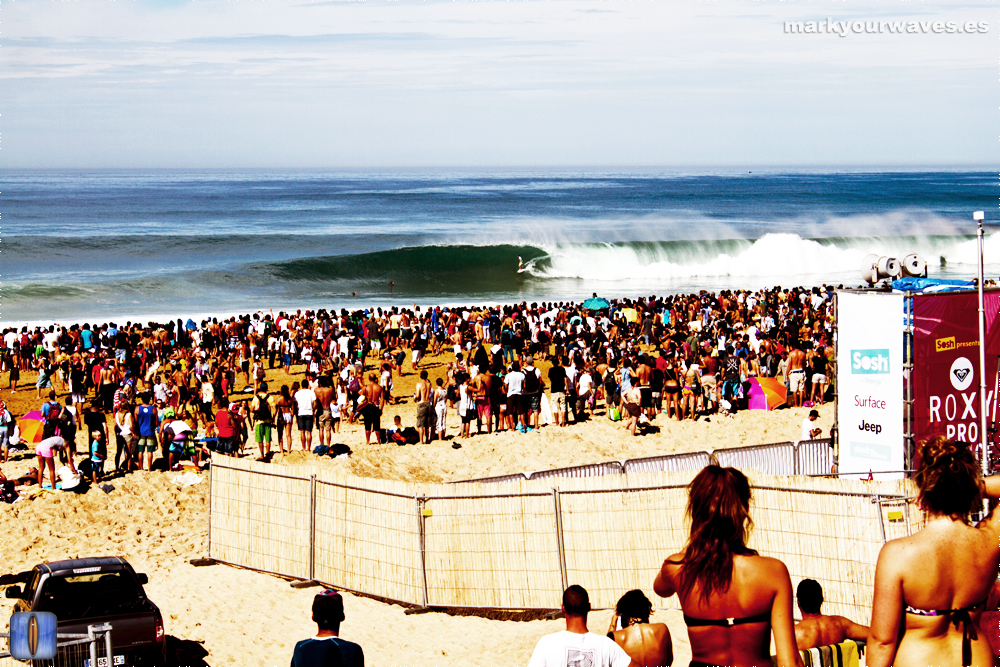
Hossegor surf competition 2013

Roxy Pro France surfing results since the competition's inception in 1992. The event is held on one of the beaches in any of the neighbouring towns of Capbreton, Hossegor, or Seignosse in Landes (Landes forest), which is located in the France, on Atlantic Europe. The competition is not held annually.

Year	Winner	1st Score	Runner-Up	2nd Score	Winner's prize money
2021	Brisa Hennessy (CRC)	15.23	India Robinson (AUS)	13.16	$20,000
2019	Carissa Moore (HAW) (3)	17.60	Caroline Marks (USA)	7.00	$100,000
2018	Courtney Conlogue (USA)	14.76	Macy Callaghan (AUS)	10.96	$65,000
2017	Carissa Moore (HAW) (2)	16.70	Lakey Peterson (USA)	14.50	$60,000
2016	Carissa Moore (HAW)	16.36	Carissa Moore (HAW)	9.83	$60,000
2015	Tyler Wright (AUS) (2)	17.10	Tatiana Weston-Webb (BRA)	10.93	$60,000
2014	Tyler Wright (AUS)	19.20	Courtney Conlogue (USA)	12.43	$60,000
2013	Sally Fitzgibbons (AUS)	17.67	Tyler Wright (AUS)	17.00	$15,000
2012	Stephanie Gilmore (AUS) (3)	18.53	Tyler Wright (AUS)	13.10	$110,000
2011	Stephanie Gilmore (AUS) (2)	17.27	Carissa Moore (HAW)	15.50	$110,000
2008	Stephanie Gilmore (AUS)				
2006	Chelsea Hedges (AUS) (3)				
2005	Chelsea Hedges (AUS) (2)				
2004	Sofía Mulánovich (PER)				
2003	Chelsea Hedges (AUS)				
2002	Layne Beachley (AUS) (4)				
2000	Layne Beachley (AUS) (3)				
1999	Rochelle Ballard (HAW)				
1998	Layne Beachley (AUS) (2)				
1997	Neridah Falconer (AUS)				
1996	Serena Brooke (AUS)				
1995	Layne Beachley (AUS)				
1994	Lyentte MacKenzie (AUS)				
1993	Kylie Webb (AUS)				
1992	Wendy Botha (AUS)				

== See also ==
- Roxy Pro Gold Coast
- Roxy
