= Tyler Wright (surfer) =

Australian surfer (born 1994)

Personal information
- Born: 31 March 1994 (age 32) Culburra Beach, New South Wales, Australia
- Height: 5 ft 7 in (170 cm)
- Weight: 149 lb (68 kg)

Surfing career
- Sport: Surfing
- Best year: 1st - WSL World Tour (2016, 2017)
- Sponsors: Rip Curl, Monster Energy Drink, Pyzel Surfboards, Oakley, Ocean & Earth, Power Base Fins
- Major achievements: 2x World Champion (2016, 2017); WSL Championship Tour event wins: 17; 1x US Open of Surfing champion (2014); 2011 WSL Rookie of the Year

Surfing specifications
- Stance: Regular (natural foot)
Medal record
Women's surfing
Representing Australia
World Games
Bronze medal – third place	2024 Arecibo	Team

Tyler Wright (born 31 March 1994) is an Australian professional surfer on the WSL World Tour. She is a consecutive WSL Women's World Champion (2016, 2017). She qualified for the 2024 Olympic Games.

== Early life ==
Wright, who is from a close-knit surfing family, grew up at Culburra Beach, a surf spot about two hours south of Sydney near Nowra. Her four siblings are Owen, Kirby, Mikey, and Tim. Her father, Rob, a passionate surfer, and her mother, Fiona, drove the whole family around Australia following the amateur scene.

== Career ==
At the age of 14, Wright overtook a number of champions, some of whom were twice her age, to become the youngest-ever winner of a Championship Tour event, Layne Beachley's Beachley Classic in 2008. Wright joined the World Surf League Women's Championship Tour in 2011, and won World Titles in 2016 and 2017. In 2025, Wright became the first woman to win the Pipe Pro event at the Banzai Pipeline twice, having won it previously in 2020 and then winning it again in 2025.

== Media ==
Australian TV channel ABC featured her in its biographic documentary program Australian Story on national television in March 2017.

== Personal life ==
Wright is bisexual, and has been married to Lilli Baker since 2022; the two had met in Newcastle the previous year while Baker was working at a local cafe and Wright was present for a surfing competition.

In 2018 Wright fell ill with chronic fatigue syndrome after influenza A.

== Career victories ==
WSL World Tour Wins
Year	Event	Venue	Country
2008	Beachley Classic	Manly Beach	Australia
2010	O'Neill Women's World Cup	Sunset Beach, Hawaii	Hawaii
2013	Roxy Pro Gold Coast	Kirra, Queensland	Australia
2013	Colgate Plax Girls Rio Pro	Rio de Janeiro, Rio de Janeiro	Brazil
2014	U.S. Open of Surfing	Huntington Beach, California	United States
2014	Roxy Pro France	Soorts-Hossegor	France
2015	Roxy Pro France	Soorts-Hossegor	France
2016	Roxy Pro Gold Coast	Snapper Rocks	Australia
2016	Drug Aware Pro Margaret River	Margaret River	Australia
2016	Oi Rio Pro	Rio de Janeiro	Brazil
2016	Swatch Women's Pro Trestles	San Clemente	United States
2016	Maui Women's Pro	Maui	Hawaii
2017	Oi Rio Women's Pro	Rio de Janeiro, Rio de Janeiro	Brazil
2021	Maui Pro presented by ROXY at Pipeline	Banzai Pipeline, Oahu	Hawaii
2022	Rip Curl Pro Bells Beach	Bells Beach, Victoria	Australia
2023	Rip Curl Pro Bells Beach	Bells Beach, Victoria	Australia
2025	Lexus Pipe Pro	Banzai Pipeline, Oahu	Hawaii

=== WSL World Championship Tour ===
Tournament	2011	2012	2013	2014	2015	2016	2017
Roxy Pro Gold Coast	2nd	3rd	1st	5th	3rd	1st	5th
Rip Curl Pro	5th	3rd	2nd	2nd	5th	5th	3rd
Margaret River Pro	—N/a	—N/a	2nd	2nd	5th	1st	2nd
Rio Pro	5th	9th	1st	3rd	3rd	1st	1st
Fiji Pro	—N/a	—N/a	—N/a	9th	9th	13th	3rd
US Open of Surfing	9th	9th	3rd	1st	13th	3rd	5th
Swatch Women's Pro at Trestles	—N/a	—N/a	—N/a	5th	5th	1st	9th
Cascais Women's Pro	—N/a	—N/a	5th	1st	9th	2nd	13th
Roxy Pro France	9th	2nd	2nd	3rd	1st	2nd	3rd
Maui Women's Pro	—N/a	—N/a	—N/a	—N/a	5th	1st	3rd
TSB Bank Women's Surf Festival	3rd	5th	9th	—N/a	—N/a	—N/a	—N/a
Beachley Classic	5th	3rd	—N/a	—N/a	—N/a	—N/a	—N/a
Rank	4th	4th	2nd	2nd	5th	1st	1st
Earnings	$44,000	$47,500	$83,000	$259,000	$171,500	$400,500	$215,250
