= Sally Fitzgibbons =

Australian surfer (born 1990)

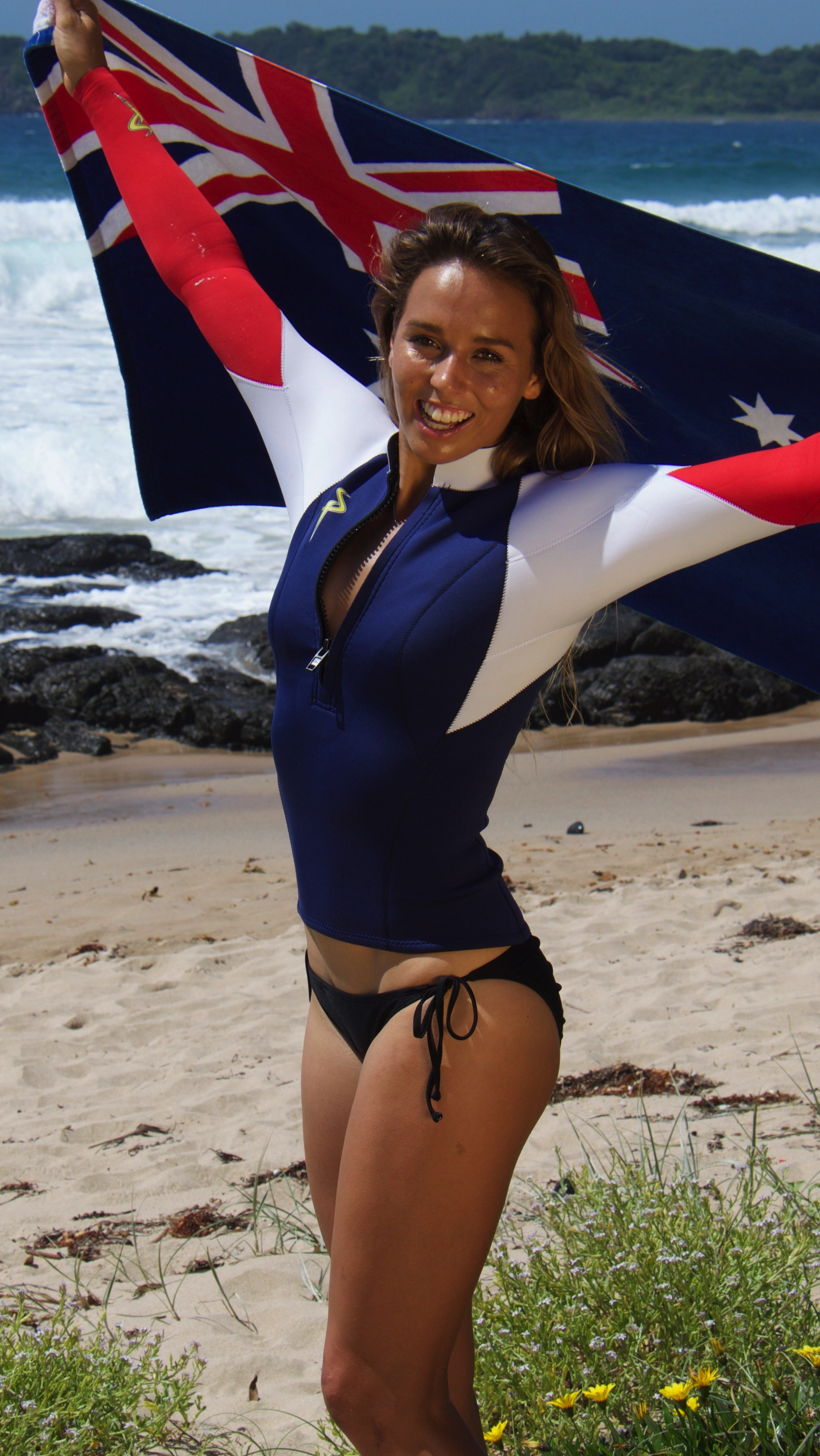

Personal information
- Born: 19 December 1990 (age 35) Gerroa, New South Wales
- Height: 170 cm (5 ft 7 in)
- Weight: 62 kg (137 lb)
- Website: www.sallyfitzgibbons.com

Surfing career
- Sport: Surfing
- Best year: 2010, 2011, 2012 – World Title Runner-Up
- Career earnings: $1,017,750.00
- Sponsors: Town & Country Surfboards, Breitling, Boost Mobile, Accor Hotels, FCS, Devika, Almond Breeze
- Major achievements: ASP World Junior Champion 2007; World Runner-up 2010, 2011 & 2012 WSL World Tour; WSL Championship Tour event wins: 12; 2x US Open of Surfing champion (2011, 2024); ISA World Jr Champion 2008; 4x ISA World Women's Champion (2008, 2018, 2021, 2024)

Surfing specifications
- Stance: Regular (natural foot)
Medal record
Women's surfing
Representing Australia
World Games
Gold medal – first place	2008 Costa de Caparica	Women
Gold medal – first place	2018 Tahara	Women
Gold medal – first place	2021 La Bocana	Women
Gold medal – first place	2024 Arecibo	Women
Gold medal – first place	2025 Surf City	Team
Silver medal – second place	2022 Huntington Beach	Team
Bronze medal – third place	2024 Arecibo	Team
Bronze medal – third place	2025 Surf City	Women

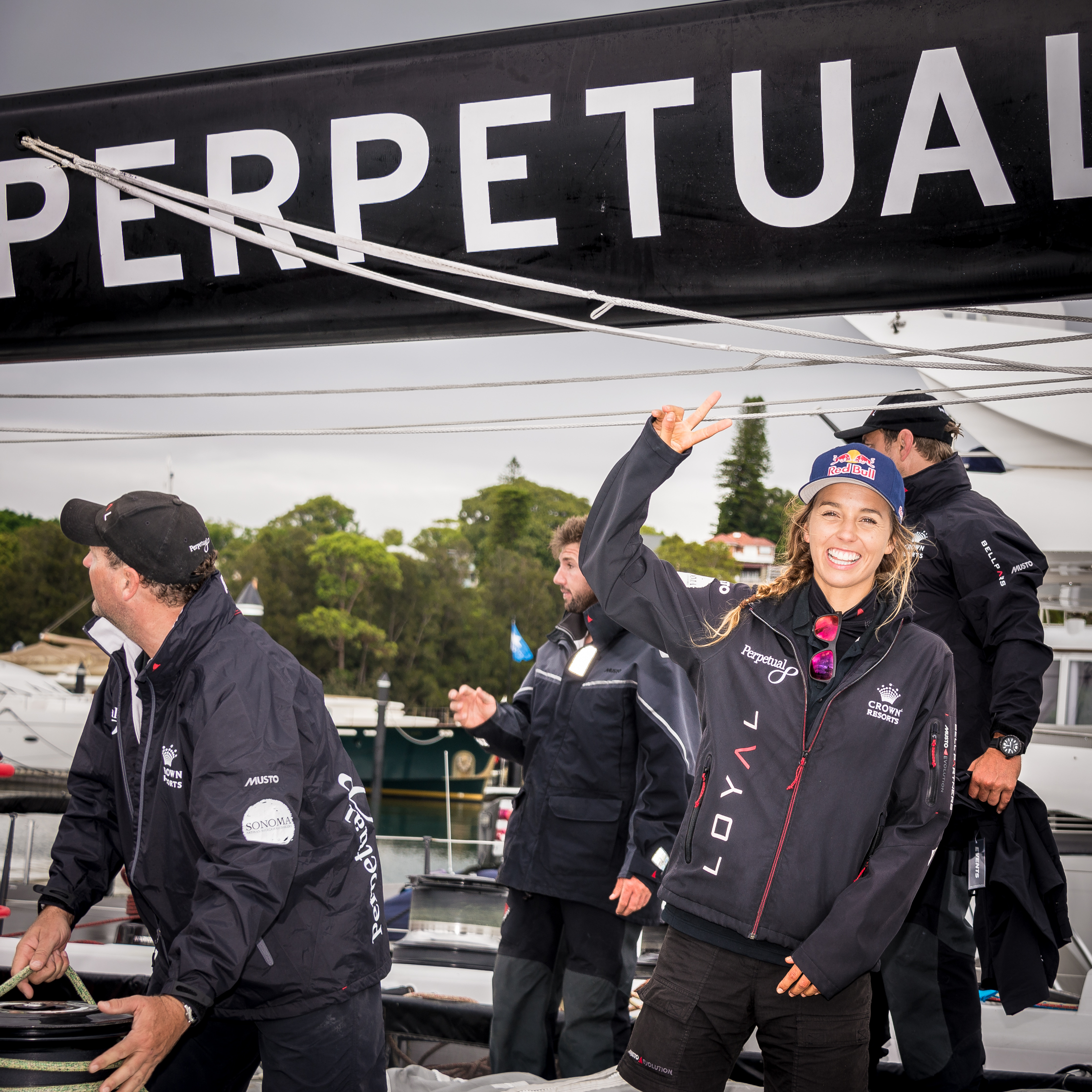
Fitzgibbons (far right) aboard super-maxi yacht Perpetual Loyal

Sally Fitzgibbons (born 19 December 1990) is an Australian professional surfer on the Association of Surfing Professionals World Tour (2009–2013). In June 2019, she was ranked No. 1 in the world for women's surfing after winning the Rio Pro.

== Surfing career ==
Fitzgibbons was born in Gerroa, New South Wales. As a 14-year-old, Sally won the ASP Pro Junior open, an event open to any female surfer 21 and younger. She started surfing at a young age, winning the Icon All-Girls Open Event Lennox Head in 2006 aged 16. She represented her State and Australia on many occasions in a number of different sports, including athletics, winning gold at the 2007 Australian Youth Olympic Festival 800m and 1500m, touch football, soccer, surfing and cross-country running while attending Kiama High School.

As a surfer, Fitzgibbons had her first significant results aged 14, becoming the youngest surfer to win an Association of Surfing Professionals (ASP) Pro Junior (Under 21s) event at that time, also finishing second at the World Qualifying Series (WQS) Billabong Easter Girls Festival on the same day. She continued to set records throughout her junior years, winning the Australasian Pro Junior Series in 2007 and 2008. At 15, Fitzgibbons represented Australia at the International Surfing Association (ISA) U18 World Surfing Titles in Brazil placing second; at 16, she travelled to Portugal for the ISA U18 World Titles and won her first World Title and backed it up the following year winning both the Billabong ASP U21 World Title and the ISA World Games Open Title.

In her first attempt to reach the women's elite World Surfing Tour via the World Qualifying Series, Fitzgibbons set a record by wrapping up the 2008 WQS series in the first 5 events to become the youngest World Surfing Tour qualifier in ASP history.

After a ten-point ride in the semi at North Narrabeen beach, Fitzgibbons won the junior women's world surfing championship.

2009 saw Fitzgibbons finish fifth on the World Surfing Tour in her rookie year, with a win at the Portugal WQS event along the way.

In 2010 Fitzgibbons came runner up in three ASP Women's World Tour events and finished the year as runner up to Stephanie Gilmore in the 2010 ASP Women's World Title.

On 23 April 2011, Fitzgibbons won her first ASP World Tour event, defeating Carissa Moore in the final of the Rip Curl Women's Pro at Bells Beach

On 30 April 2011, Fitzgibbons won her second ASP World Tour event, once again defeating Carissa Moore in the final of the Subaru Pro in Taranaki, New Zealand. With this win she became the world's top-ranked female surfer and took the lead in the 2011 ASP World Tour.

In August 2011, Fitzgibbons won her third ASP World Tour event, defeating Lakey Peterson in the final of the US Open of Surf in California, USA. She finished the season runner up to Carissa Moore in the 2011 ASP Women's World Title.

On 6 December 2011, Fitzgibbons came fifth in the 2011 Surfer Poll Awards held by Surfer magazine.

In 2011 Fitzgibbons also won the 6-Star event Swatch Girls Pro France.

In February 2012, Fitzgibbons won the first ever Australian Open after defeating 2004 World Champion Sofia Mulanovich, this meant Fitzgibbons will be the first person to ever hold the US and Australian Opens of Surf titles at the one time.

On 23 February 2012, at the 2012 ASP World Surfing Awards Fitzgibbons won three awards. First was for being runner up in the 2011 World Tour. Second was for Fitzgibbons and Carissa Moore for winning the Women's ASP Heat of the Year as voted on by their fellow competitors. Lastly she won the ASP Surfers' Surfer award which is a peer award.

On 17 March 2012, Fitzgibbons won the 6-Star event the Hunter Ports Women's Classic during Surfest at Merewether Beach, Newcastle, Australia. Fitzgibbons defeated Malia Manuel in the final.

In April 2012, Fitzgibbons won the Rip Curl Pro at Bells Beach Australia, it was back-to-back wins at Bells for Fitzgibbons. She beat four-time world champion Stephanie Gilmore in the final.

On 13 May 2012, Fitzgibbons won the Billabong Rio Pro in Brazil, she was up against Coco Ho in the final.

Fitzgibbons won a gold medal at the final qualifying event at the ISA World Games in El Salvador in June 2021 (her fourth ISA Gold medal) in the lead up to the 2020 Tokyo Olympics. This was her 3rd ISA World Title which is the most held by a female surfer.

=== Tokyo Olympics ===
Fitzgibbons had qualified for the 2020 Tokyo Olympics in 2019 by finishing in the top eight on the WSL World Tour that year. At the Olympics in the quarterfinal she lost to Amuro Tsuzuki of Japan and therefore did not compete for a medal finishing 5th. Australia at the 2020 Summer Olympics details the results in depth.

== Career victories ==
ASP/WSL Women's World Tour Wins
Year	Event	Venue	Country
2011	Rip Curl Women's Pro	Bells Beach, Victoria	Australia
2011	Subaru Pro TSB Bank Women's Surf Festival	Taranaki	New Zealand
2011	US Open of Surfing	Huntington Beach, California	United States
2012	Rip Curl Women's Pro	Bells Beach, Victoria	Australia
2012	Billabong Rio Pro	Rio de Janeiro	Brazil
2013	Roxy Pro France	Hossegor	France
2014	Billabong Pro Brazil	Rio de Janeiro	Brazil
2014	Fiji Pro	Tavarua	Fiji
2015	Fiji Pro	Tavarua	Fiji
2017	Drug Aware Margaret River Pro	Margaret River, Western Australia	Australia
2019	Oi Rio Pro	Rio de Janeiro	Brazil
2021	Rottnest Island Pro Ripcurl Search	Rottnest Island, Western Australia	Australia

=== Results ===
2015 results

Roxy Pro Gold Coast	9th
Rip Curl Women's Pro Bells Beach	3rd
Women's Drug Aware Margaret River Pro	3rd
Oi Rio Women's Pro	9th
Fiji Women's Pro	1st
Women's Vans US Open of Surfing	2nd
Swatch Women's Pro	5th
Cascais Women's Pro	3rd
Roxy Pro France	5th
Target Maui Pro	2nd

2014 results
• 5th ASP Roxy Pro, Gold Coast, Queensland
• 3rd ASP US Open of Surf, Margaret River, Western Australia, Australia
• 3rd ASP Rip Curl Women's Pro, Bells Beach, Australia
• 1st ASP Billabong Pro Rio, Rio de Janeiro, Brazil
• 1st ASP Fiji Pro Fiji, Cloudbreak, Fiji
• 3rd ASP US Open of Surf, California, USA
• 2nd ASP Hurley Trestles Pro, California, USA
• 5th ASP Roxy Pro France, Hossegor, France
• 2nd ASP EDP Pro Portugal, Cascais, Portugal
• 5th ASP Target Pro, Maui, USA

2013 results
• 1st ASP 6STAR Break Burleigh Pro, Burleigh Heads, Queensland, Australia
• 2nd ASP 6STAR Hunter Ports Women's Classic, Newcastle, New South Wales, Australia
• 2nd ASP Roxy Pro, Gold Coast, Queensland
• 3rd ASP TSB Bank NZ Surf Festival featuring the Dow AgroSciences Pro, Taranaki, New Zealand
• 3rd ASP Drug Aware Pro, Margaret River, Western Australia, Australia
• 5th ASP Rip Curl Women's Pro, Bells Beach, Australia
• 2nd ASP Billabong Colgate Plax Pro Rio, Rio de Janeiro, Brazil
• 5th ASP US Open of Surf, California, USA
• 1st ASP Roxy Pro France, Hossegor, FRA
• 2nd ASP EDP Billabong Pro, Portugal, PRT

2012 results – Runner-up WT Ranking
• 1st ASP 6STAR Australian Open, Manly, Australia
• 3rd ASP Roxy Pro, Gold Coast, Queensland
• 1st ASP 6STAR Hunter Ports Women's Classic, Newcastle, New South Wales
• 1st ASP Rip Curl Women's Pro, Bells Beach, Australia
• 5th ASP TSB Bank NZ Surf Festival featuring the Dow AgroSciences Pro, Taranaki, New Zealand
• 5th ASP Beachley Classic, Dee Why, Australia
• 1st ASP Billabong Rio Pro, Rio de Janeiro, Brazil
• 5th ASP Roxy Pro, Biarritz, France
• 3rd ASP US Open of Surf, California, USA

2011 results – Runner-up WT Ranking
• 3rd ASP 6STAR Legendary Pacific Coast Pro, Newcastle, New South Wales
• 3rd ASP Roxy Pro, Biarritz, France
• 3rd ASP Beachley Classic, Dee Why, Australia
• 2nd ASP Billabong Rio Pro, Rio de Janeiro, Brazil
• 1st ASP 6STAR Swatch Girls Pro, Hossegor, France
• 1st ASP US Open of Surf, California, USA
• 3rd ASP Roxy Pro, Gold Coast, Queensland
• 1st ASP Rip Curl Women's Pro, Bells Beach, Australia
• 1st ASP Subaru TSB Bank Pro WT, Taranaki, New Zealand

2010 results – Runner-up WT Ranking

- 2nd ASP Movistar Classic WT Peru
- 1st ASP Estoril Surf Festival 6 Star WQS Guinch Portugal
- 2nd ASP Beachley Classic WT Dee Why Australia
- 2nd ASP TSB Bank Pro WT Taranaki New Zealand
- 3rd ASP RipCurl Pro WT Bells Beach Australia
- 2nd ASP Drug Aware Pro 6Star WQS Margaret River

2009 results – 5th WT Ranking

- 3rd ASP Billabong Pro WT Honolua Bay Maui Hawaii
- 2nd ASP Gidget Pro WT Sunset Beach Hawaii
- 3rd ASP Ripcurl Pro WT Lobitos Peru
- 1st ASP Estoril Festival 6 Star WQS Guinch Portugal
- 3rd ASP RipCurl Pro WT Bells Beach Australia

== Other sports ==
Fitzgibbons competed in athletics before she started her professional surfing career. She was a national champion winning middle-distance runner in the 800m and 1500m, also winning gold medals in both those events at the 2007 Youth Olympics. She also played touch football and soccer. She is a third cousin of former Socceroos goalkeeper Mark Bosnich.

As a sports fan, she supports the National Rugby League team the St George Illawarra Dragons. She is also an Australian Football League fan and follows the Geelong Cats, her favourite players being Joel Selwood and Patrick Dangerfield.
