= Sage Erickson =

American professional surfer (born 1990)

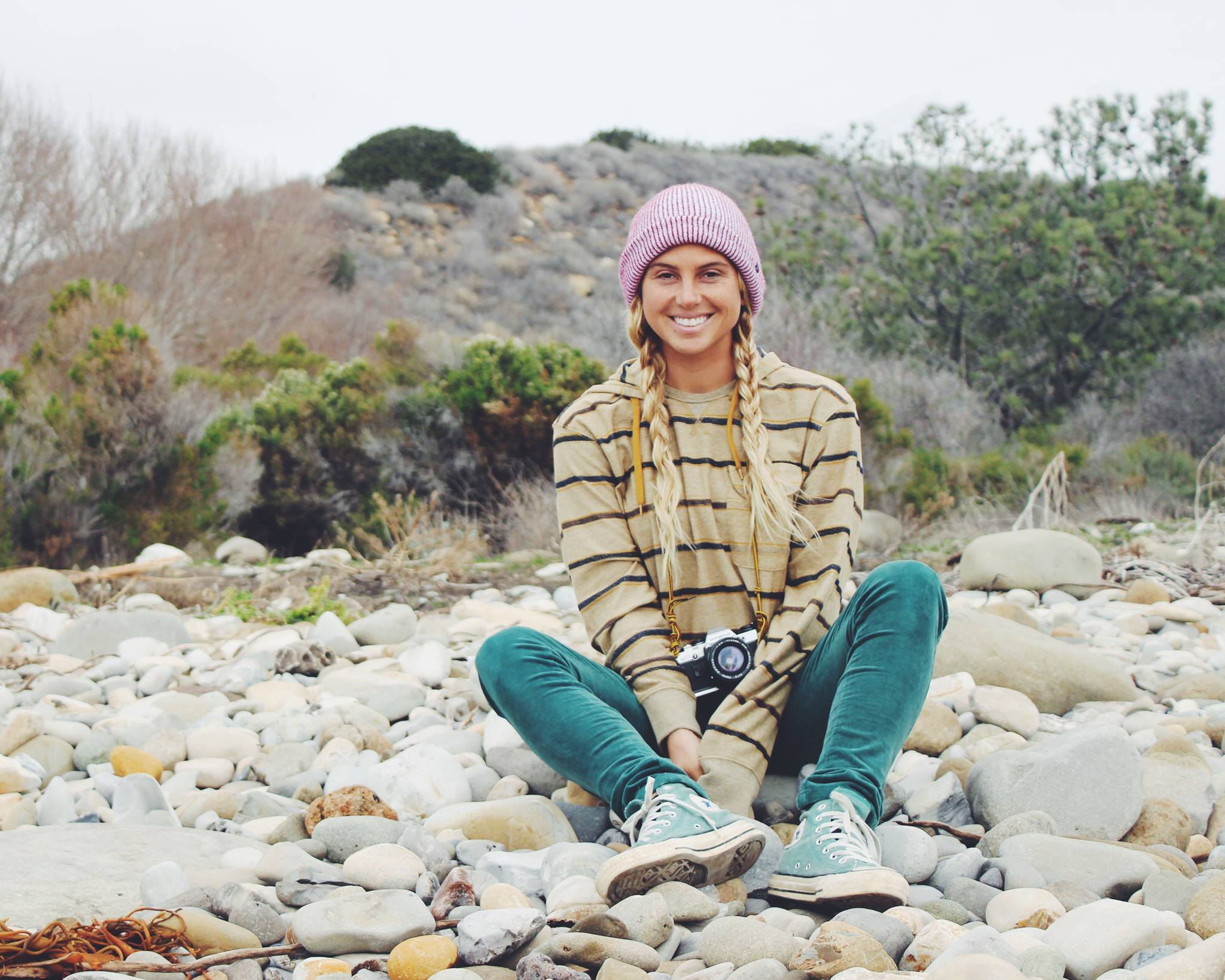
- Erickson in January 2016

Personal information
- Born: 28 December 1990 (age 35) Ojai, California, U.S.
- Height: 5 ft 7 in (1.70 m)

Surfing career
- Sport: Surfing
- Major achievements: 2x US Open of Surfing champion (2017, 2019)

Surfing specifications
- Stance: Natural (regular) foot
- Shaper: Channel Islands by Al Merrick
- Quiver: 5'4" to 6'5"

Sage Erickson (born December 28, 1990) is an American professional surfer born in Ojai, California, United States.

== Career ==
At the age of nine, Erickson moved to the Island of Oahu, Hawaii. When she was 11, at Sunset Beach with her family, she picked up a board and paddled out. She got her first wave all the way in. After that, she began surfing every day. At the age of 14, Erickson moved to Ventura, California, where she currently resides. She started her competitive surfing career when she was 14. She dominated the NSSA and Pro Junior circuits, and in 2012, at age 21, she qualified for the Women's Association of Professional Surfing ASP, which is now called the World Surf League.

In 2016, Erickson ranked number 9 in the World Surfing Tour. Erickson has been featured on channels such as ESPN, GrindTV, and Surfer Magazine. In 2014, she was listed on Maxim as one of the top 100 Hottest women, ranking number 87. On January 15, 2021, Erickson appeared on the Los Angeles Rams YouTube channel, alongside Los Angeles Rams wide receiver Cooper Kupp and Sarina Morales, testing their sustainability knowledge.

== Victories ==
Year	Result	Event	Country	Notes
2007	Bronze Medal	ISA World Juniors	Portugal	
2010	3rd	Oakley World Pro Junior Championships	Indonesia	
2010	1st	U.S. Open Junior Pro	United States	
2011	2nd	Swatch Girls Pro	France	
2012	Qualifies	for Women's WSL World Tour		
2012	3rd	Swatch France Pro	France	
2012	1st	Paul Mitchell Supergirl Pro	United States	
2012	1st	Cabreiroa Pantin Classic Pro	Spain	
2013	5th	Roxy Pro France (WCT)	France	
2014	1st	Paul Mitchell Supergirl Pro	United States	
2015	3rd	Roxy Pro France	France	
2015	3rd	Port Taranaki Pro NZ Home Loans Surf Festival	New Zealand	
2015	1st	Copa El Salvador Impressionante	El Salvador	
2015	3rd	Paul Mitchell Supergirl Pro	United States	
2015	3rd	Port Taranaki Pro NZ Home Loans Surf Festival	New Zealand	
2015	5th	Hurley Australian Open of Surf	Australia	
2016	5th	Vans US Open of Surfing	United States	
2016	5th	Paul Mitchel Supergirl Pro	United States	
2016	5th	Roxy Pro Gold	Australia	
2016	5th	Taggart Women's Pro	Australia	
2016	1st	Pantin Classic Galicia Pro	Spain	
2016	3rd	Swacth's Women's Pro	United States	
2016	5th	Cascais Women's Pro	Portugal	
2016	5th	Roxy Pro France	France	
2017	1st	US Open of Surfing	United States	
2019	1st	US Open of Surfing	United States	

== Sponsors ==
- Buell Wetsuits
- CI Channel Islands Surfboard
- Oakley
- Freestyle watches
- Perfect Fit
- Db Journey
- Shell

== Personal life ==
Erikson has been in a relationship with professional baseball player Daniel Norris since 2021. The pair married in November 2023.
