= Laura Enever =

Australian professional surfer

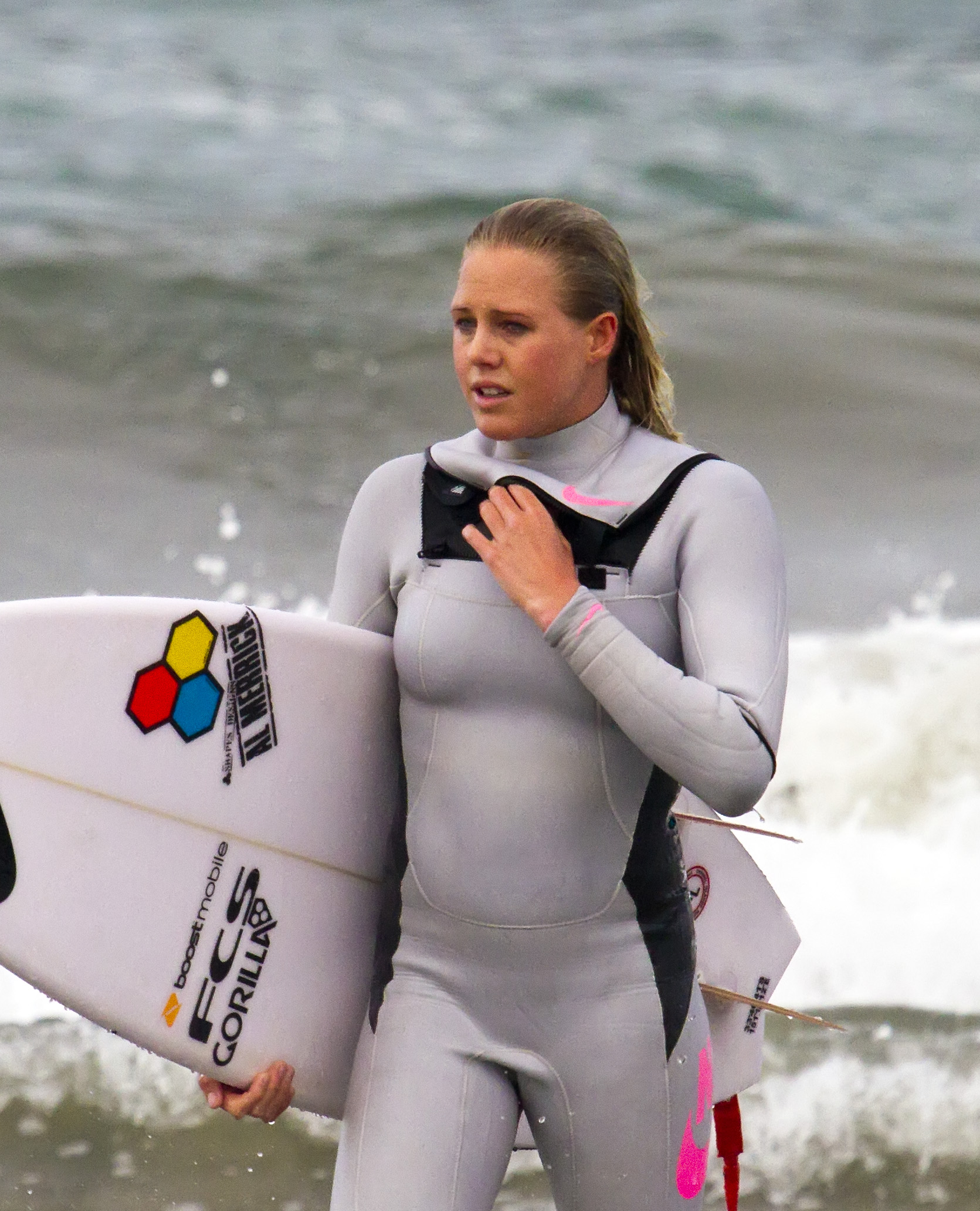
- Laura Enevers at the 2012 US Open of Surfing in Huntington Beach, CA.

Personal information
- Nickname: Lauzy
- Born: 14 November 1991 (age 34) Sydney, Australia
- Height: 5 ft 6 in (1.68 m)
- Weight: 119 lb (54 kg)

Surfing career
- Sport: Surfing
- Best year: 2008 & 2009
- Major achievements: ASP Triple Crown Rookie of the Year; ASP Women’s World Junior Champion 2009

Surfing specifications
- Stance: Natural (regular foot)

Laura Enever (born 14 November 1991) is an Australian professional surfer. Enever was the ASP Women's World Junior Champion in 2009. She made her professional debut in 2011.

As of March 2015, Enever competes at the highest level of professional surfing, touring with the World Surf League. She finished 10th in final standings for the 2014 Women's Samsung Galaxy Championship Tour.

== Surf Career Highlights ==
- 2016 Tied for 4th at the Pe’ahi Women's Challenge
- 2015 Hurley Australian Open of Surfing
- 2009 ASP Women's World Junior Champion
- 2009 Billabong Pro Junior Coffs Harbour
- 2008 ISA Junior World Champion
- 2008 Triple Crown Rookie of the Year

After competing for seven years in the WSL, Enever shifted to big wave surfing. She set the Guinness World Record for the largest wave paddled into by a woman: a 43.6 ft. (13.29 m) wave at "Outer Reef" on Oʻahu's North Shore, on 22 January 2023, breaking Andrea Moller's January 2016 record (42 foot [12,8 m], Peʻahi, Maui).
