= Nikki van Dijk =

Australian professional surfer (born 1994)

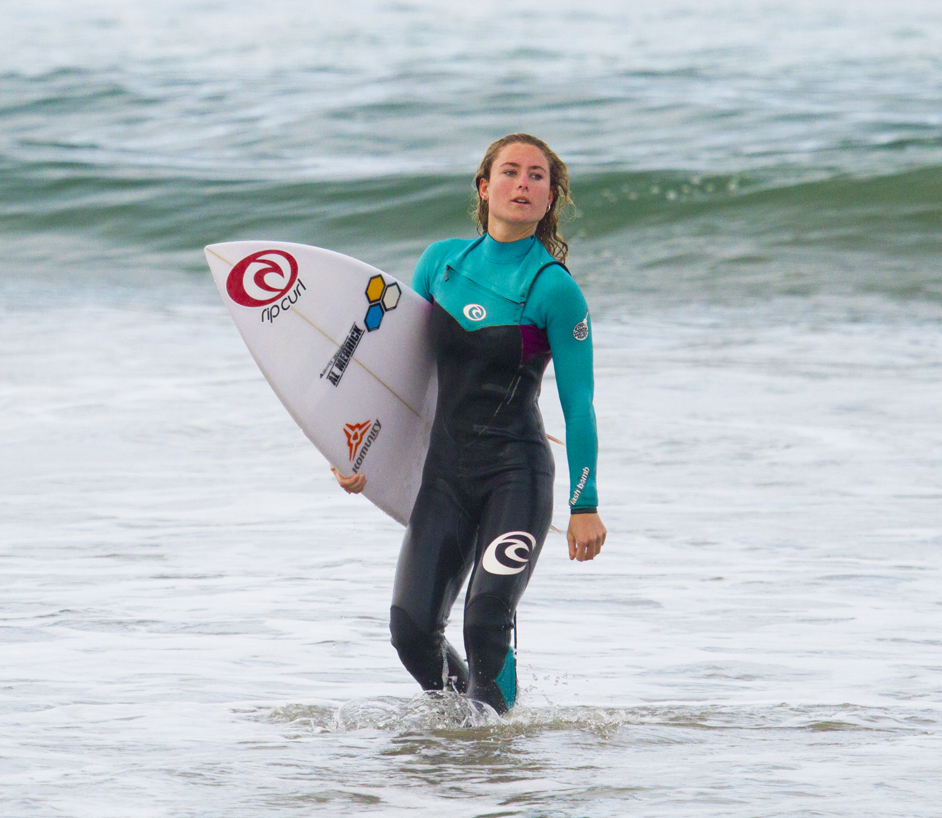

Personal information
- Born: 28 November 1994 (age 31) Phillip Island, Victoria, Australia
- Height: 5 ft 7 in (170 cm)
- Weight: 122 lb (55 kg)

Surfing career
- Sport: Surfing
- Sponsors: Rip Curl, Channel Islands Surfboards, Oakley and Kommunity Project

Surfing specifications
- Stance: Regular (natural foot)
- Shaper: Al Merrick

Nikki van Dijk (born 28 November 1994) is an Australian professional surfer. She has been a touring competitor in the World Surf League, the top flight of international professional surfing.

== Career ==
Van Dijk won the women's world junior title in 2012 in Bali. In 2013, she competed in the Association of Surfing Professionals' Qualifying Series; she ended her season by winning the Pantin Classic Galicia Pro in Spain, and qualified for the ASP Women's Championship Tour. As a rookie, van Dijk finished 13th on the 2014 Women's Samsung Galaxy Championship Tour.

Van Dijk continued to compete at the highest level of the sport through 2021 with the World Surf League, the successor to the ASP tour. In May 2015 she got her best result in a WSL CT competition in Fiji, moving into quarters. In 2021 she finished 13th on the WSL tour, below the automatic qualifying threshold for the 2022 season.

At the same time she was on tour, she competed in some Qualifying Series events. In June 2015 she won Los Cabos Open of Surfing at Zippers beach.

2015 was van Dijk's best year on the WSL tour, finishing the year with six quarter-finals in a row. She finished in 9th place for the season, and qualified to compete on the WSL tour again in 2016.

=== Career highlights ===
Surf Career Highlights
Year	Placed	Event
2016	11th	World Surf League Ranking
2016	3rd	Swatch Women's Pro – California
2015	9th	World Surf League Ranking
2015	1st	Los Cabos Open of Surfing – Mexico
2014	13th	World Surf League Ranking
2014	13th	Women's Samsung Galaxy Championship Tour
2013	1st	Pantin Classic Galicia Pro – Spain
2012	1st	World Junior Title – Bali

== Sponsors ==
Van Dijk's sponsors have included Rip Curl, Channel Islands Surfboards, Oakley and Kommunity Project.
