= Bronte Macaulay =

Australian surfer (born 1994)

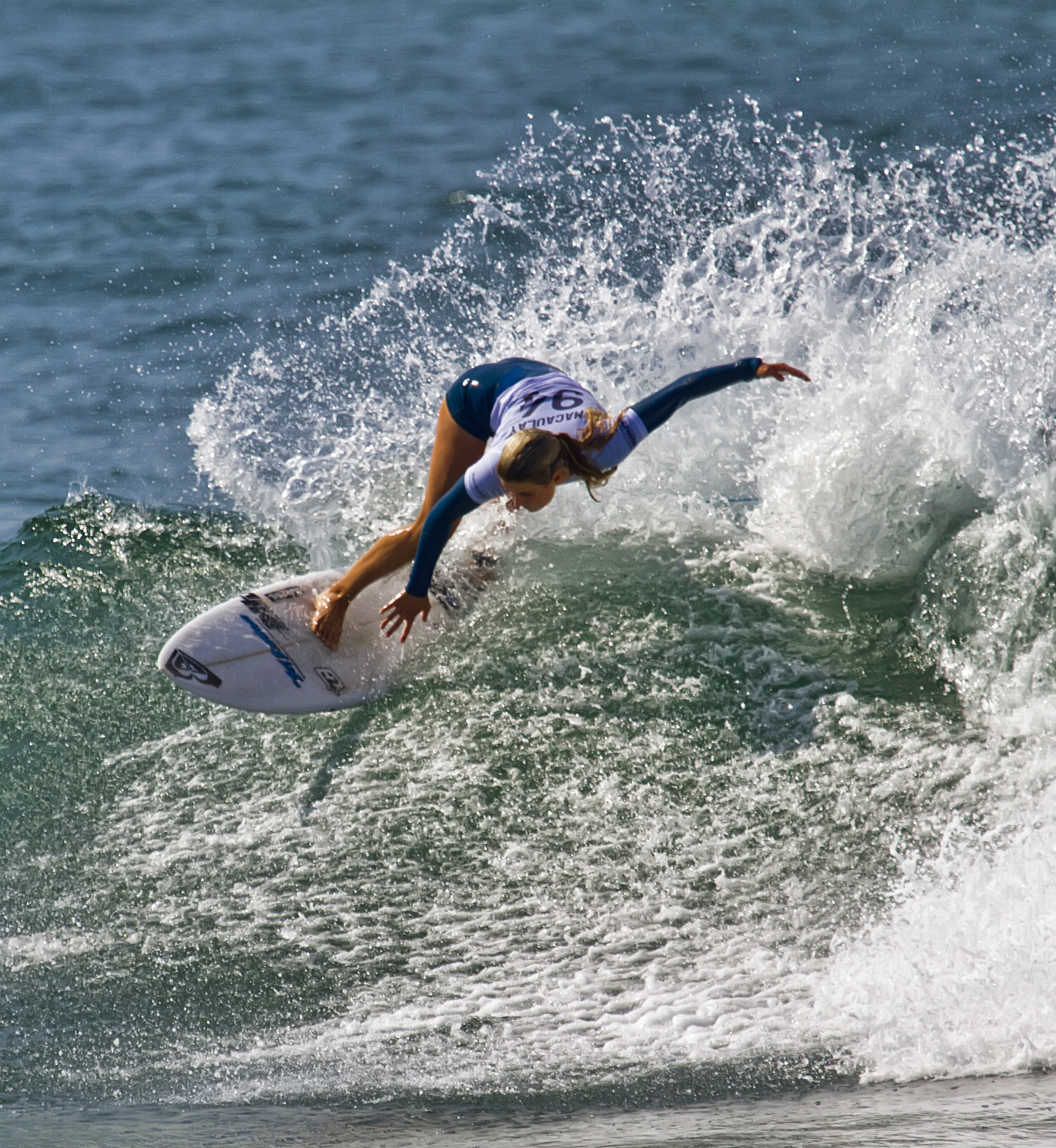
- Macaulay at 2017 Swatch Women's Pro

Personal information
- Born: 9 January 1994 (age 32) Gracetown, Australia
- Height: 5 ft 7 in (170 cm)
- Weight: 130 lb (59 kg)

Surfing career
- Sport: Surfing
- Sponsors: Roxy, Dave Macaulay Surfboards, Electric, Creatures of Leisure, Sticky Feet

Surfing specifications
- Stance: Goofy
- Shaper: Dave Macaulay

Bronte Macaulay (born 9 January 1994) is an Australian professional surfer. She competes in the World Surf League.

== Life ==
Macaulay learned to surf along the coast of Western Australia when she was 9 years old. Her father, Dave Macaulay, who was an icon professional surfer in the 80's and 90's, taught surfing to Macaulay and her older twin sisters.

== Career ==
Macaulay was one spot short of qualifying for the Championship Tour in 2016 but was able to take the spot of Lakey Peterson after she was unable to continue after breaking her ankle. This gave her six shots against some of the world's top female surfers, and she beat Sally Fitzgibbons at Snapper, and Stephanie Gilmore and Johanne Defay at home in Margaret River. She became an official member of the Tour in 2017.

=== Career highlights ===
Surf Career Highlights
Year	Placed	Event
2018	5th	Uluwatu CT - Bali
2018	5th	Corona Open J Bay - Africa
2017	15th	World Surf League Ranking
2017	3rd	Maui Women's Pro – Hawaii
2016	17th	World Surf League Ranking

== Sponsors ==
Macaulay's sponsors have included: Roxy, Dave Macaulay Surfboards, Electric, Creatures of Leisure, Sticky Feet
