= Keely Andrew =

Australian surfer

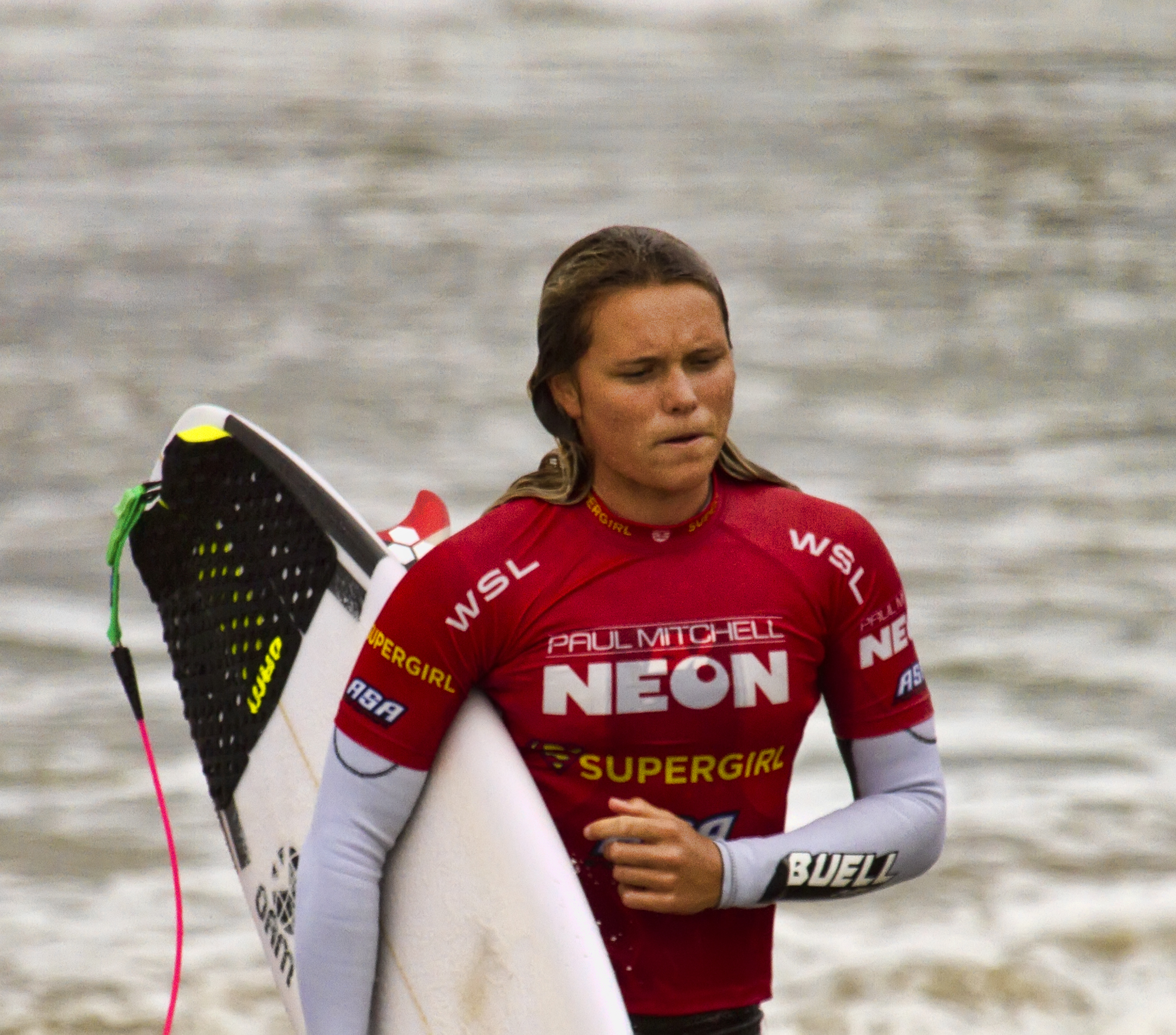
- Keely Andrew in 2017

Personal information
- Born: 2 December 1994 (age 31) Mooloolaba, Sunshine Coast, Queensland, Australia
- Height: 5 ft 7 in (170 cm)

Surfing career
- Sport: Surfing
- Best year: 2016 named the WSL "Rookie of the Year"
- Sponsors: JR Surfboards, On a Mission, Surfmud, Buell Wetsuits

Surfing specifications
- Stance: Regular
- Shaper: JR Surfboards

Keely Andrew (born 2 December 1994) is a professional surfer from Australia.

Andrew finished second in the Australian Junior Surfing Titles.

== Career highlights ==
Surf Career Highlights
Year	Placed	Event	Region
2017	2nd	WCT Swatch Women's Pro	United States
2017	3rd	WQS Los Cabos Open of Surf	Mexico
2017	5th	WQS Supergirl Pro	United States
2017	5th	WCT Roxy Pro Gold Coast	Australia
2017	5th	WCT Oi Rio Women's Pro	Brazil
2016	2nd	WQS WSL Ranking	
2016	1st	Named the WSL "Rookie of the Year"	
2016	1st	WQS El Salvador Pro	El Salvador
2016	5th	WCT Van's US Open Of Surfing	United States
2016	5th	WQS Los Cabos Open of Surf	Mexico
2016	3rd	WQS Sydney's Intl Women's Pro	Australia
2016	5th	WQS Pantin Classic Galicia Pro	Spain
2016	3rd	WCT Maui Women's Pro	United States
2015	5th	WQS WSL Ranking	
2015	1st	WQS Port Taranaki Pro	New Zealand
2015	2nd	WQS El Salvador Pro	El Salvador
2015	5th	Oi Rio Women's Pro	Brazil
2014	5th	MWQS Swatch Girl's Pro	Brazil
2014	5th	WQS Supergirl Pro	United States
2014	2nd	WQS Oceano Santa Catarina Pro	Brazil
2013	3rd	WQS Swatch Girl's Pro	France
