= Carissa Moore =

American surfer (born 1992)

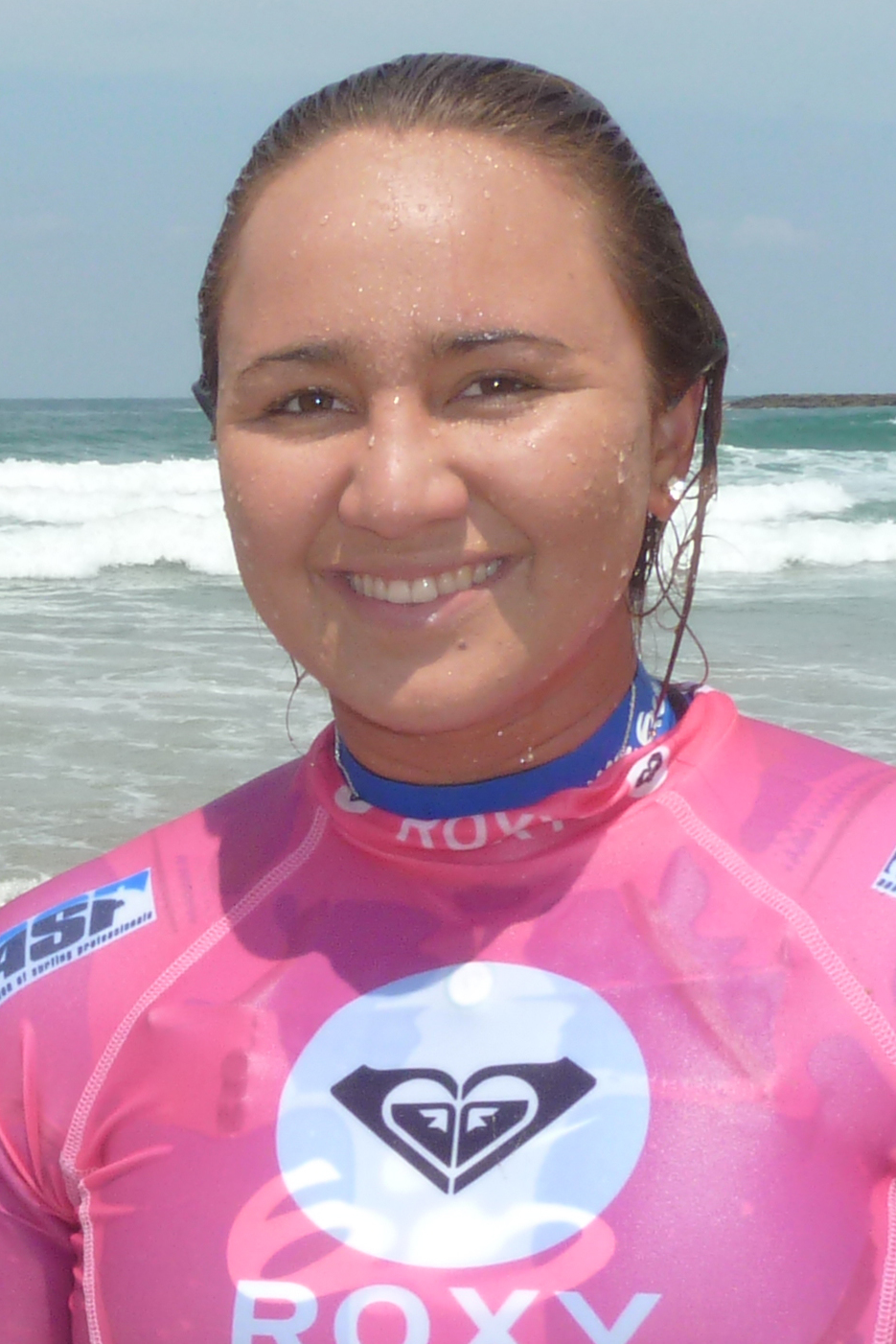
- Moore at the 2011 Roxy Pro France in Biarritz, France

Personal information
- Full name: Carissa Kainani Moore
- Born: August 27, 1992 (age 34) Honolulu, Hawaii, U.S.
- Height: 5 ft 7 in (170 cm)
- Weight: 140 lb (64 kg)
- Website: www.carissamoore.com

Surfing career
- Sport: Surfing
- Best year: 1st: 2011, 2013, 2015, 2019, 2021
- Career earnings: $2.1 million on world tour 2010-19
- Sponsors: Nike, Red Bull, Target, Hurley, Subaru Hawaii, Visa, Gillette Venus, FCS traction and fins
- Major achievements: 5× World Champion (2011, 2013, 2015, 2019, 2021); 2020 Olympics Gold Medal; WSL Championship Tour event wins: 31; 3× Triple Crown of Surfing Champion (2020, 2021, 2023); 2010 WSL Rookie of the Year; 2× US Open of Surfing champion (2010, 2013); 11 NSSA Titles; Surfers' Hall of Fame inductee

Surfing specifications
- Stance: Regular
- Shaper: Matt "Mayhem" Biolos
Medal record
Women's surfing
Representing United States
Olympic Games
Gold medal – first place	2020 Tokyo	Shortboard
World Games
Silver medal – second place	2019 Miyazaki	Team

Carissa Kainani Moore (born August 27, 1992) is an American surfer. She was the first-ever winner of the Olympic gold medal in women's shortboard surfing at the 2020 Summer Olympics. She is also a five-time world champion, winning in 2011, 2013, 2015, 2019 and 2021 on the World Surf League WSL Women's World Tour. Moore was the first surfer in history to win a WSL world title and the Olympic title in the same year.

In 2013, she was named by Glamour magazine as one of their Women of the Year. She became a member of the Surfers' Hall of Fame in 2014. In 2022, Moore was featured in Naomi Hirahara's anthology We Are Here: 30 Inspiring Asian Americans and Pacific Islanders Who Have Shaped the United States that was published by the Smithsonian Institution and Running Press Kids.

== Early life ==
When she was five years old, Moore started surfing with her father, Chris, off the beaches of Waikiki in Honolulu, Hawaii. "Dad taught me how to surf when I was about four or five years old at Waikiki Beach and I was immediately hooked." Her father was a competitive open water swimmer who won a number of competitions. He lived closer to the water than Moore's landlocked mother, so Moore chose Hawaii, the ocean, and her father after her parents divorced when she was ten years old. When Moore stayed with her mother, and her motivation for surfing started to wane, she would write letters to her father to stay motivated.

She started earning multiple wins at National Scholastic Surfing Association, NSSA, junior surf competitions at age 11. She also won top spots at the International Surfing Association, ISA, World Junior Surfing Championships, where she helped Hawaii win a team victory. In all, she clinched a record 11 NSSA amateur titles, and at age 16 in 2008, she became the youngest champion at a Triple Crown of Surfing event when she won the Reef Hawaiian Pro.

== Career ==
In 2010, Moore qualified to compete on the ASP (now called the World Surf League) Championship Tour. She won two major contests, finished third overall, and was named Rookie of the Year.

The following season, Moore was a youngster to watch on the World Tour and she lived up to her reputation, winning three events and claiming her first World crown, unseating four-time defending champ Stephanie Gilmore in the process. At 18, she became the youngest person – male or female – to win a surfing world title.

Moore took top World Tour honors again in 2013 and 2015.

Moore has been named an Adventurer of the Year by National Geographic, a Woman of the Year by Glamour magazine and Top Female Surfer in the SURFER magazine poll (numerous times). She was inducted into the Surfers' Hall of Fame, and the State of Hawaii declared January 4 to be Carissa Moore Day.

=== 2019 Championship Tour ===
At the 2019 World Surf League Women's Championship Tour, Moore finished in first place and qualified for the 2020 Summer Olympics.

=== 2020 ===
She announced after the 2019 season that she would take a break from the world tour in 2020.

=== 2020 Summer Olympics ===
2020 Summer Olympics
Gold medal – first place	Shortboard	14.93

Moore qualified to compete for the United States in surfing on the U.S. women's team with Caroline Marks at the 2020 Summer Olympics held in Tokyo, Japan and postponed to 2021 due to the COVID-19 pandemic. Moore competed under the flag of the United States for the first time in her career at the 2020 Summer Olympics as the World Surf League and International Surfing Association both recognize Hawaii as an entity separate of the United States. At the 2020 Olympic Games, she represented the United States for the first time and was the first surfer to participate in the Olympic Games that is ethnically Hawaiian since the final Olympic appearance of Duke Kahanamoku in 1924.

In the first round of competition, Moore scored an 11.74 and won her heat, which advanced her directly to the third round of competition. Moore won her heat of the third round of competition against Peruvian Sofía Mulánovich with a 10.34 and advanced to the quarterfinals. Moore won her head-to-head competition with a score of 14.26 in the quarterfinals against Brazilian Silvana Lima and advanced to the semifinals. In the semifinals match between Moore and Japan's Amuro Tsuzuki, Moore won and advanced to the final heat where surfers compete for the gold and silver medals. In the final match against South African Bianca Buitendag, Moore won the Olympic gold medal with a score of 14.93. As the 2020 Summer Olympics were the first Olympic Games where surfing was included as a sport, Moore became the first woman in history to win an Olympic gold medal in surfing.

=== 2021 Season ===
In 2021, Carissa Moore won the WSL season at the WSL Finals in Trestles (surfing). She also won the Triple Crown of Surfing in January 2022.

=== 2023 Season ===
In 2023, Moore placed second in the 2023 World Surf League Championship Tour. This qualified her to compete in the 2024 Olympic Games in Paris.

=== 2024 Season ===
Moore competed at the 2024 Olympic Games, along with Caroline Marks and Caitlin Simmers representing the United States. She was eliminated in the quarterfinals.

== Personal life ==
Moore is of Irish and German descent through her father, while her mother is Native Hawaiian and Filipino. She chooses to wear the flag of Hawaii, which is similar to the Hawaii State flag, instead of the United States flag when she competes for the United States at World Surf League international competitions.

Surfer and shark attack survivor Bethany Hamilton wrote in her autobiography that she admired Moore's toughness when they participated in the same competition as seven- to nine-year-olds.

Moore is a 2010 graduate from Punahou School in Honolulu. She married her high school sweetheart, Luke Untermann, on December 16, 2017.

In 2018, Moore launched Moore Aloha Charitable Foundation, a 501(c)(3) organization focused on using surfing as a platform to bring young women together.

== WSL Qualifying Series ==
In 2008, at the age of 16, Moore became the youngest winner of a Triple Crown of Surfing event when she won the Reef Hawaiian Pro, a 6-Star WQS Prime Event^{2}.

In 2009, Moore qualified for the 2010 ASP World Tour from the ASP Women's WQS.

In 2010, Moore won the US Open of Surfing, a 6-Star WQS Prime Event^{1}.

In 2011, Moore received a wildcard entry into the Men's Triple Crown of Surfing, limited to the Reef Hawaiian Pro at Haleiwa and the Vans Hawaiian Pro at Sunset Beach, becoming the first woman in history to be given the honor.

== WSL Women’s Championship Tour ==
In 2007, Moore reached the Final of the ASP Women's World Tour Roxy Pro event as a wildcard, becoming the youngest surfer to reach a Final of an ASP World Title Race event. The Roxy Pro wildcard entry was the first Women's World Tour event Moore entered after success in the Roxy Pro Trials.

In 2009, Moore won the ASP Women's World Tour Gidget Pro Sunset Beach event as a wildcard entrant.

In 2010, Moore started competing on the ASP Women's World Tour. During her first year on the Tour Moore won both the TSB Bank Women's Surf Festival and Rip Curl Pro Portugal. Moore's 2010 Women's World Tour Ranking was 3rd overall. and she was awarded the ASP Women's World Tour Rookie of the Year.

In 2011, Moore was declared the ASP Women's World Champion, the youngest winner of the Title. Throughout the 2011 Tour, Moore won the Billabong Rio Pro, Commonwealth Bank Beachley Classic and the Roxy Pro Gold Coast.

In 2012, Moore finished 3rd in the 2012 ASP World Tour, failing to win any ASP World Tour events, coming runner-up in two events.

In 2013, Moore won four of the eight ASP World Tour events and became World Champion for the second time in her career.

In 2014, Moore won three WSL Women's Championship Tour events.

In 2015, she again won four Events of the WSL Championship Tour and won her third world title.

In 2016, Moore's only victory was the Roxy Pro in Hossegor, France.

In 2017, she finished the year at No. 5.

In 2018, she finished the year at No. 3.

In 2019, she won her fourth world championship, winning stops in France and South Africa.

In 2021, she won another world championship, successfully defending her title against Tatiana Weston-Webb in a head-to-head title match at the inaugural WSL Finals.

== WSL Event Wins ==
Year	Event	Venue	WSL Sanctioned Tour
2026	Surf City El Salvador Pro	Punta Roca, La Libertad (El Salvador)	Women's Championship Tour
2026	Corona Cero New Zealand	Raglan, New Zealand	Women's Championship Tour
2023	Surf Ranch Pro	Lemoore, California (United States)	Women's Championship Tour
2023	Margaret River Pro	Margaret River, Western Australia	Women's Championship Tour
2023	Billabong Pro Pipeline	Banzai Pipeline, Oahu (Hawaii)	Women's Championship Tour
2022	Oi Rio Pro	Rio de Janeiro, Brazil	Women's Championship Tour
2021	Rip Curl WSL Finals	Lower Trestles, San Clemente, California (United States)	Women's Championship Tour
2021	Rip Curl Newcastle Cup presented by Corona	Newcastle, New South Wales, Australia	Women's Championship Tour
2019	Roxy Pro France	Hossegor, Landes, Nouvelle-Aquitaine, France	Women's World Tour
2019	Corona Open J-Bay	J-Bay South Africa	Women's World Tour
2018	Beachwater Maui Pro	Honolua, Hawaii, (United States)	Women's World Tour
2018	Surf Ranch Pro	Lemoore, California, United States	Women's World Tour
2017	Roxy Pro France	Hossegor, France France	Women's World Tour
2016	Roxy Pro France	Hossegor, France France	Women's World Tour
2015	Swatch Women's Pro	San Clemente, California, United States	Women's World Tour
2015	Target Maui Pro	Honolua, Hawaii, (United States)	Women's World Tour
2015	Rip Curl Women's Pro Bells Beach	Bells Beach, Victoria, Australia	Women's World Tour
2015	Roxy Pro Gold Coast	Gold Coast, Queensland, Australia	Women's World Tour
2014	Target Maui Pro	Honolua, Hawaii, (United States)	Women's World Tour
2014	Rip Curl Pro	Bells Beach, Victoria, Australia	Women's World Tour
2014	Drug Aware Margaret River Women's Pro	Margaret River, Western Australia, Australia	Women's World Tour
2013	Cascais Women's Pro	Cascais, Portugal	Women's World Tour
2013	US Open of Surfing	Huntington Beach, California, United States	Women's WQS
2013	Rip Curl Pro	Bells Beach, Victoria, Australia	Women's World Tour
2013	Drug Aware Margaret River Women's Pro	Margaret River, Western Australia, Australia	Women's World Tour
2011	Billabong Pro Rio	Rio de Janeiro, Brazil	Women's World Tour
2011	Commonwealth Bank Beachley Classic	Dee Why, New South Wales, Australia	Women's World Tour
2011	Roxy Pro Gold Coast	Gold Coast, Queensland, Australia	Women's World Tour
2010	Rip Curl Pro Portugal	Peniche, Portugal	Women's World Tour
2010	TSB Bank Women's Surf Festival	Taranaki, New Zealand	Women's World Tour
2010	US Open of Surfing	Huntington Beach, California, United States	Women's WQS
2009	Gidget Pro	Sunset Beach, (United States)	Women's World Tour^{3}
2008	Reef Hawaiian Pro	Ali'i Beach Park, Haleʻiwa, (United States)	Women's WQS

== National Scholastic Surfing Association Titles ==
Moore is known for her unprecedented 11 National Scholastic Surfing Association (NSSA) Titles.

National Scholastic Surfing Association Titles
2004	2005	2006	2007
Open Women's; Explorer Women's; Middle School Girls	Open Women's; Explorer Girls; Middle School Girls	Open Women's; Explorer Girls; Middle School Girls	Open Women's; Explorer Women's

== International Surfing Association ==
2005, Moore represented Hawai‘i at the International Surfing Association (ISA) World Junior Surfing Championships and was placed 3rd in the Female Junior Final (under 18) category. Moore aided Hawai‘i's first team victory in a World Junior surfing contest.

== Notes ==
1 & 2 The equivalent of an ASP Women’s Star; at the time it was known as an ASP 6-Star Prime within the Women’s World Qualifying Series (WQS).
3 As a wildcard entrant Moore was ineligible to compete in the ASP World Title Race.

== See also ==
- Association of Surfing Professionals
- National Scholastic Surfing Association
- Punahou School Alumni
