= Malia Manuel =

American surfer

Personal information
- Born: Kelsey Malia Manuel; August 9, 1993 (age 33) Wailua, Kauai, Hawaii, U.S.
- Height: 5 ft 6 in (168 cm)
- Weight: 119 lb (54 kg)
- Website: http://www.maliamanuel.com/

Surfing career
- Sport: Surfing
- Sponsors: Athletic Brewing, Sunbum, DHD surfboards
- Major achievements: 2012 WSL Rookie of the Year

Surfing specifications
- Stance: Regular (natural foot)
- Shaper: Darren Handley
- Favorite waves: Hawaii

Kelsey Malia Manuel (born August 9, 1993) is an American professional surfer. She won Rookie of the Year in 2012 and was ranked 5th on the 2014 ASP World Tour. In 2008, at the age of 14 she became the youngest surfer ever to win the U.S. Open of Surfing.

== Early life ==
Manuel was born in Wailua, Hawaii and is of Native Hawaiian descent. She graduated from Kapaa High School and the American College of Healthcare Sciences. She hails from a lineage deeply connected to Hawaiian culture and the ocean, with roots in Hanalei Bay tracing back several generations. Her family's connection to the land and sea became the cornerstone of her journey into professional surfing.

== Modeling and brand collaboration ==
Manuel has been sponsored by several brands and appeared in advertisements and photo shoots. She made her debut in the Sports Illustrated swimsuit issue in 2020. Malia collaborated with Lululemon on her first fashion line, focusing on swimwear designed for performance and comfort. The collection features pieces like the "Will the Wave" top and bottom, which offer security and flat seams to cater to the needs of active surfers and ocean enthusiasts.

Malia co-founded the sclpt co in 2023. Their mission is to promote health and wellness by naturally enhancing workouts and recovery techniques, aiming to sculpt the mind, body, and spirit through conscious practices.

== Surfing career highlights ==
- 2019 – 2nd Rip Curl Pro Bells Beach
- 2019 – 3rd Boost Mobile Pro Gold Coast
- 2018 – 2nd Beachwaver Maui Pro
- 2017 – 1st Australian Open of Surfing (Manly, New South Wales)
- 2016 – 2nd Van's US Open
- 2014 – Ranked 5th on the World Surf League Tour
- 2014 – WQS 6star, Merewether Surf Fest Champion
- 2013 – ASP World Rankings Champion
- 2013 – WQS 6star, SuperGirl Pro Champ
- 2012 – ASP Women's Rookie of The Year
- 2011 – Top Qualifier for the Elite ASP Women's World Tour
- 2011 – WQS 6star, Azores Islands Champion
- 2011 – WQS 6star, Pantin Spain Champion
- 2011 – Cover of TransWorld Surf Magazine (2nd female ever)
- 2010 – Hawaii World Team member
- 2009 – Hawaii World Team member
- 2009 – US Open Junior Women's Champ
- 2009 – Junior Women Regional Champ
- 2009 – VQS Champion
- 2008 – Youngest US Open Champ
- 2008 – International Grom Search Champ
- 2008 – Junior Women Regional Champ
- 2008 – Hawaii World Team Member
- 2008 – NSSA National champ Explorer Women's
- 2007 – NSSA Middle School girls National Champion
- 2006 – NSSA Open Women runner up
- 2005 – Hawaii World Team member
- 2004 – Surfing America Champion National Title
