= Rip Curl Pro 2015 (women) =

The Rip Curl Pro 2015 was an event of the Association of Surfing Professionals for 2015 ASP World Tour.

This event was held from 1 to 12 April at Bells Beach, (Victoria, Australia) and contested by 18 surfers.

The tournament was won by Carissa Moore (HAW), who beat Stephanie Gilmore (AUS) in final.

== Round 1 ==
Heat 1
1	B. Buitendag	(South Africa)	10.76
2	Malia Manuel	(Hawaii)	10.33
3	Laura Enever	(Australia)	8.57

Heat 2
1	Sally Fitzgibbons	(Australia)	18.37
2	Silvana Lima	(Brazil)	17.67
3	Nikki Van Dijk	(Australia)	11.93

Heat 3
1	Carissa Moore	(Hawaii)	17.97
2	Pauline Ado	(France)	11.10
3	Dimity Stoyle	(Australia)	8.00

Heat 4
1	S. Gilmore	(Australia)	15.50
2	T. Weston-Webb	(Hawaii)	12.50
3	Alessa Quizon	(Hawaii)	8.24

Heat 5
1	Johanne Defay	(France)	14.50
2	Tyler Wright	(Australia)	11.57
3	Sage Erickson	(United States)	9.33

Heat 6
1	Lakey Peterson	(United States)	15.90
2	Coco Ho	(Hawaii)	11.77
3	C.Conlogue	(United States)	10.84

== Round 2 ==
Heat 1: 1 / T. Weston-Webb / (Hawaii) / 14.10; 2 / Laura Enever / (Australia) / 14.00	Heat 2: 1 / Silvana Lima / (Brazil) / 17.50; 2 / Nikki Van Dijk / (Australia) / 14.60	Heat 3: 1 / Tyler Wright / (Australia) / 14.14; 2 / Paline Ado / (France) / 14.03

Heat 4: 1 / Alessa Quizon / (Hawaii) / 13.33; 2 / Malia Manuel / (Hawaii) / 13.00	Heat 5: 1 / C.Conlogue / (United States) / 18.17; 2 / Sage Erickson / (United States) / 12.30	Heat 6: 1 / Coco Ho / (Hawaii) / 13.84; 2 / Dimity Stoyle / (Australia) / 12.26

== Round 3 ==
Heat 1
1	Sally Fitzgibbons	(Australia)	16.17
2	Lakey Peterson	(United States)	16.04
3	Alessa Quizon	(Hawaii)	12.36

Heat 2
1	Carissa Moore	(Hawaii)	18.50
2	Johanne Defay	(France)	12.37
3	Silvana Lima	(Brazil)	9.40

Heat 3
1	S. Gilmore	(Australia)	18.37
2	B. Buitendag	(South Africa)	8.67
3	T. Weston-Webb	(Hawaii)	5.03

Heat 4
1	Coco Ho	(Hawaii)	13.97
2	C.Conlogue	(United States)	13.77
3	Tyler Wright	(Australia)	13.74

== Round 4 ==
Heat 1: 1 / Lakey Peterson / (United States) / 16.13; 2 / Silvana Lima / (Brazil) / 13.23	Heat 2: 1 / Johanne Defay / (France) / 14.54; 2 / Alessa Quizon / (Hawaii) / 11.60	Heat 3: 1 / Tyler Wright / (Australia) / 17.63; 2 / B. Buitendag / (South Africa) / 10.90	Heat 4: 1 / C.Conlogue / (United States) / 13.44; 2 / T. Weston-Webb / (Hawaii) / 13.26

== Quarter finals ==
Heat 1: 1 / Sally Fitzgibbons / (Australia) / 13.50; 2 / Lakey Peterson / (United States) / 10.60	Heat 2: 1 / Carissa Moore / (Hawaii) / 16.37; 2 / Johanne Defay / (France) / 8.23	Heat 3: 1 / S. Gilmore / (Australia) / 15.34; 2 / Tyler Wright / (Australia) / 13.77	Heat 4: 1 / C.Conlogue / (United States) / 15.56; 2 / Coco Ho / (Hawaii) / 15.17

== Semi finals ==
Heat 1: 1 / Carissa Moore / (Hawaii) / 15.50; 2 / Sally Fitzgibbons / (Australia) / 13.40	Heat 2: 1 / Stephanie Gilmore / (Australia) / 16.50; 2 / C. Conlogue / (United States) / 16.23

== Final ==
Heat 1
1	Carissa Moore	(Hawaii)	14.00
2	Stephanie Gilmore	(Australia)	13.27
