= Fiji Women's Pro 2015 =

Fiji Women's Pro 2015 at the Surf
- Location: Namotu (FJI)
- Dates: 01 to 05 June
- Competitors: 18 from 6 nations

Medalists
gold medal	Sally Fitzgibbons	Australia
silver medal	B. Buitendag	South Africa

The Fiji Women's Pro 2015 was an event of the Association of Surfing Professionals for 2015 ASP World Tour.

This event was held from 01 to 5 June at Namotu, (Tavarua, Fiji) and opposed by 36 surfers.

The tournament was won by Sally Fitzgibbons (AUS), who beat B. Buitendag (ZAF) in the final.

== Round 1 ==
Heat 1
1	Lakey Peterson	(United States)	12.00
2	T. Weston-Webb	(Hawaii)	11.00
3	Alessa Quizon	(Hawaii)	6.83

Heat 2
1	Laura Enever	(Australia)	17.80
2	Sally Fitzgibbons	(Australia)	17.67
3	Coco Ho	(Hawaii)	11.17

Heat 3
1	Carissa Moore	(Hawaii)	14.60
2	Dimity Stoyle	(Australia)	12.83
3	Mahina Maeda	(Hawaii)	7.66

Heat 4
1	C.Conlogue	(United States)	11.50
2	Johanne Defay	(France)	7.83
3	Keely Andrew	(Australia)	5.50

Heat 5
1	Tyler Wright	(Australia)	11.93
2	Sage Erickson	(United States)	11.13
3	Silvana Lima	(Brazil)	10.23

Heat 6
1	B. Buitendag	(South Africa)	17.06
2	Nikki Van Dijk	(Australia)	15.57
3	Malia Manuel	(Hawaii)	14.40

== Round 2 ==
Heat 1: 1 / Nikki Van Dijk / (Australia) / 12.70; 2 / Silvana Lima / (Brazil) / 11.66	Heat 2: 1 / Coco Ho / (Hawaii) / 16.34; 2 / Alessa Quizon / (Hawaii) / 13.66	Heat 3: 1 / Sally Fitzgibbons / (Australia) / 11.06; 2 / Mahina Maeda / (Hawaii) / 8.57

Heat 4: 1 / Malia Manuel / (Hawaii) / 12.87; 2 / Keely Andrew / (Australia) / 8.27	Heat 5: 1 / T. Weston-Webb / (Hawaii) / 18.23; 2 / Sage Erickson / (United States) / 11.17	Heat 6: 1 / Johanne Defay / (France) / 15.10; / Dimity Stoyle / (Australia) / 14.17

== Round 3 ==
Heat 1
1	Sally Fitzgibbons	(Australia)	17.10
2	Laura Enever	(Australia)	14.77
3	Lakey Peterson	(United States)	13.07

Heat 2
1	T. Weston-Webb	(Hawaii)	17.67
2	Carissa Moore	(Hawaii)	14.87
3	Coco Ho	(Hawaii)	13.44

Heat 3
1	C.Conlogue	(United States)	15.60
2	Johanne Defay	(France)	13.16
3	B. Buitendag	(South Africa)	6.33

Heat 4
1	Nikki Van Dijk	(Australia)	11.27
2	Malia Manuel	(Hawaii)	10.50
3	Tyler Wright	(Australia)	8.67

== Round 4 ==
Heat 1: 1 / Laura Enever / (Australia) / 13.67; 2 / Coco Ho / (Hawaii) / 9.00	Heat 2: 1 / Lakey Peterson / (United States) / 14.67; 2 / Carissa Moore / (Hawaii) / 14.60	Heat 3: 1 / Johanne Defay / (France); 2 / Tyler Wright / (Australia) / 10.76	Heat 4: 1 / B. Buitendag / (South Africa) / 14.70; 2 / Malia Manuel / (Hawaii) / 12.36

== Quarter finals ==
Heat 1: 1 / Sally Fitzgibbons / (Australia) / 17.06; 2 / Laura Enever / (Australia) / 11.34	Heat 2: 1 / Lakey Peterson / (United States) / 12.57; 2 / T. Weston-Webb / (Hawaii) / 11.73	Heat 3: 1 / Johanne Defay / (France) / 13.00; 2 / C.Conlogue / (United States) / 4.26	Heat 4: 1 / B. Buitendag / (South Africa) / 18.03; 2 / Nikki Van Dijk / (Australia) / 9.57

== Semi finals ==
Heat 1: 1 / Sally Fitzgibbons / (Australia) / 16.83; 2 / Lakey Peterson / (United States) / 3.33	Heat 2: 1 / B. Buitendag / (South Africa) / 18.40; 2 / Johanne Defay / (France) / 16.97

== Final ==
Heat 1
1	Sally Fitzgibbons	(Australia)	18.56
2	B. Buitendag	(South Africa)	14.40
