= Oi Rio Pro 2015 (Woman) =

The Rio Pro 2015 was an event of the Association of Surfing Professionals for 2015 ASP World Tour.

This event was held from 11 to 22 May at Rio de Janeiro, (Rio de Janeiro, Brazil) and opposed by 18 surfers.

The tournament was won by Courtney Conlogue (USA), who beat Bianca Buitendag (ZAF) in final.

== Round 1 ==
Heat 1
1	B. Buitendag	(South Africa)	12.00
2	Lakey Peterson	(United States)	10.20
3	Alessa Quizon	(Hawaii)	8.50

Heat 2
1	Sally Fitzgibbons	(Australia)	11.73
2	Johanne Defay	(France)	8.00
3	Laura Enever	(Australia)	4.67

Heat 3
1	Carissa Moore	(Hawaii)	9.50
2	Dimity Stoyle	(Australia)	3.40
3	Luana Coutinho	(Brazil)	0.50

Heat 4
1	Keely Andrew	(Australia)	11.07
2	Tyler Wright	(Australia)	9.83
3	Coco Ho	(Hawaii)	8.53

Heat 5
1	C.Conlogue	(United States)	13.33
2	Sage Erickson	(United States)	10.00
3	Silvana Lima	(Brazil)	3.13

Heat 6
1	T. Weston-Webb	(Hawaii)	11.43
2	Malia Manuel	(Hawaii)	10.96
3	Nikki Van Dijk	(Australia)	10.36

== Round 2 ==
Heat 1: 1 / Silvana Lima / (Brazil) / 10.83; 2 / Nikki Van Dijk / (Australia) / 9.50	Heat 2: 1 / Johanne Defay / (France) / 10.00; 2 / Alessa Quizon / (Hawaii) / 5.43	Heat 3: 1 / Tyler Wright / (Australia) / 14.83; 2 / Luana Coutinho / (Brazil) / 6.84

Heat 4: 1 / Lakey Peterson / (United States) / 14.77; 2 / Sage Erickson / (United States) / 10.77	Heat 5: 1 / Malia Manuel / (Hawaii) / 15.60; 2 / Laura Enever / (Australia) / 14.27	Heat 6: 1 / Coco Ho / (Hawaii) / 9.83; 2 / Dimity Stoyle / (Australia) / 8.17

== Round 3 ==
Heat 1
1	Lakey Peterson	(United States)	16.83
2	Sally Fitzgibbons	(Australia)	12.23
3	Keely Andrew	(Australia)	7.76

Heat 2
1	Carissa Moore	(Hawaii)	14.87
2	Johanne Defay	(France)	9.84
3	B. Buitendag	(South Africa)	8.37

Heat 3
1	Tyler Wright	(Australia)	17.57
2	Silvana Lima	(Brazil)	13.60
3	T. Weston-Webb	(Hawaii)	8.63

Heat 4
1	Malia Manuel	(Hawaii)	13.77
2	C.Conlogue	(United States)	12.93
3	Coco Ho	(Hawaii)	8.86

== Round 4 ==
Heat 1: 1 / B. Buitendag / (South Africa) / 15.70; 2 / Sally Fitzgibbons / (Australia) / 14.23	Heat 2: 1 / Keely Andrew / (Australia) / 14.33; 2 / Johanne Defay / (France) / 13.00	Heat 3: 1 / Coco Ho / (Hawaii) / 11.16; 2 / Silvana Lima / (Brazil) / 9.84	Heat 4: 1 / C.Conlogue / (United States) / 15.83; 2 / T. Weston-Webb / (Hawaii) / 10.87

== Quarter finals ==
Heat 1: 1 / B. Buitendag / (South Africa) / 13.27; 2 / Lakey Peterson / (United States) / 10.16	Heat 2: 1 / Carissa Moore / (Hawaii) / 14.60; 2 / Keely Andrew / (Australia) / 10.06	Heat 3: 1 / Tyler Wright / (Australia) / 11.67; 2 / Coco Ho / (Hawaii) / 11.50	Heat 4: 1 / C.Conlogue / (United States) / 11.50; 2 / Malia Manuel / (Hawaii) / 10.20

== Semi finals ==
Heat 1: 1 / B. Buitendag / (South Africa) / 13.50; 2 / Carissa Moore / (Hawaii) / 10.84	Heat 2: 1 / C.Conlogue / (United States) / 13.16; 2 / Tyler Wright / (Australia) / 11.17

== Final ==
Heat 1
1	C.Conlogue	(United States)	14.50
2	B. Buitendag	(South Africa)	11.10
