= Margaret River Pro 2015 (women) =

The Margaret River Pro 2015 was an event of the Association of Surfing Professionals for 2015 ASP World Tour.

This event was held from 15 to 26 April at Margaret River, (Western Australia, Australia) and opposed by 18 surfers.

The tournament was won by C.Conlogue (USA), who beat Carissa Moore (HAW) in final.

== Round 1 ==
Heat 1
| 1 | Lakey Peterson | (United States) | 8.60 |
| 2 | Johanne Defay | (France) | 8.57 |
| 3 | Nikki Van Dijk | (Australia) | 5.00 |

Heat 2
| 1 | Sally Fitzgibbons | (Australia) | 16.50 |
| 2 | T. Weston-Webb | (Hawaii) | 13.50 |
| 3 | Alessa Quizon | (Hawaii) | 12.23 |

Heat 3
| 1 | Carissa Moore | (Hawaii) | 12.96 |
| 2 | Claire Bevilacqua | (Australia) | 5.60 |
| 3 | Coco Ho | (Hawaii) | -- |

Heat 4
| 1 | S. Gilmore | (Australia) | 8.33 |
| 2 | B. Buitendag | (South Africa) | 7.00 |
| 3 | Sage Erickson | (United States) | 6.00 |

Heat 5
| 1 | Tyler Wright | (Australia) | 16.74 |
| 2 | Silvana Lima | (Brazil) | 8.50 |
| 3 | Laura Enever | (Australia) | 5.23 |

Heat 6
| 1 | C.Conlogue | (United States) | 15.54 |
| 2 | Malia Manuel | (Hawaii) | 13.67 |
| 3 | Dimity Stoyle | (Australia) | 3.20 |

== Round 2 ==
| Heat 1: 1 / B. Buitendag / (South Africa) / 14.80; 2 / Nikki Van Dijk / (Australia) / 13.90 | Heat 2: 1 / Silvana Lima / (Brazil) / 13.74; 2 / Alessa Quizon / (Hawaii) / 10.66 | Heat 3: 1 / Malia Manuel / (Hawaii) / 15.60; 2 / Claire Bevilacqua / (Australia) / 6.80 |

| Heat 4: 1 / Johanne Defay / (France) / 16.50; 2 / Sage Erickson / (United States) / 15.50 | Heat 5: 1 / T. Weston-Webb / (Hawaii) / 18.30; 2 / Laura Enever / (Australia) / 8.44 | Heat 6: 1 / Coco Ho / (Hawaii) / 15.83; 2 / Dimity Stoyle / (Australia) / 8.73 |

== Round 3 ==
Heat 1
| 1 | Sally Fitzgibbons | (Australia) | 18.80 |
| 2 | Lakey Peterson | (United States) | 15.00 |
| 3 | Coco Ho | (Hawaii) | 11.67 |

Heat 2
| 1 | Carissa Moore | (Hawaii) | 19.23 |
| 2 | T. Weston-Webb | (Hawaii) | 17.26 |
| 3 | Johanne Defay | (France) | 15.77 |

Heat 3
| 1 | Malia Manuel | (Hawaii) | 15.53 |
| 2 | Silvana Lima | (Brazil) | 11.40 |
| 3 | S. Gilmore | (Australia) | INJ |

Heat 4
| 1 | Tyler Wright | (Australia) | 16.97 |
| 2 | C.Conlogue | (United States) | 15.20 |
| 3 | B. Buitendag | (South Africa) | 13.20 |

== Round 4 ==
| Heat 1: 1 / Lakey Peterson / (United States) / 17.16; 2 / Johanne Defay / (France) / 12.00 | Heat 2: 1 / T. Weston-Webb / (Hawaii) / 17.26; 2 / Coco Ho / (Hawaii) / 13.13 | Heat 3: 1 / B. Buitendag / (South Africa) / 17.44; 2 / Silvana Lima / (Brazil) / 15.73 | Heat 4: 1 / C.Conlogue / (United States) / ----; 2 / S. Gilmore / (Australia) / INJ |

== Quarter finals ==
| Heat 1: 1 / Sally Fitzgibbons / (Australia) / 13.84; 2 / Lakey Peterson / (United States) / 8.73 | Heat 2: 1 / Carissa Moore / (Hawaii) / 17.3733; 2 / T. Weston-Webb / (Hawaii) / 9.07 | Heat 3: 1 / Malia Manuel / (Hawaii) / 15.40; 2 / B. Buitendag / (South Africa) / 14.80 | Heat 4: 1 / C.Conlogue / (United States) / 15.70; 2 / Tyler Wright / (Australia) / 12.96 |

== Semi finals ==
| Heat 1: 1 / Carissa Moore / (Hawaii) / 14.73; 2 / Sally Fitzgibbons / (Australia) / 14.27 | Heat 2: 1 / C.Conlogue / (United States) / 17.53; 2 / Malia Manuel / (Hawaii) / 15.87 |

== Final ==
Heat 1
| 1 | C.Conlogue | (United States) | 16.93 |
| 2 | Carissa Moore | (Hawaii) | 13.13 |
