= Maui Women's Pro 2015 =

Target Maui Pro 2015 at the Surf
- Location: Honolua, Hawaii (HAW)
- Dates: 21 November 2015 - 4 December 2015
- Competitors: 18 from 6 nations

Medalists
gold medal	Carissa Moore	Hawaii
silver medal	Sally Fitzgibbons	Australia

The Target Maui Pro 2015 was an event of the Association of Surfing Professionals for the 2015 ASP World Tour, held from 21 November 2015 to 4 December 2015 at Honolua, Hawaii, United States.

The tournament was won by Carissa Moore (Hawaii), who beat Sally Fitzgibbons (Australia) in the final.

== Round 1 ==
Heat 1
1	T. Weston-Webb	(Hawaii)	15.07
2	Tyler Wright	(Australia)	9.50
3	Dimity Stoyle	(Australia)	6.67

Heat 2
1	Malia Manuel	(Hawaii)	13.96
2	Lakey Peterson	(United States)	13.16
3	Sage Erickson	(United States)	13.10

Heat 3
1	Carissa Moore	(Hawaii)	16.93
2	Silvana Lima	(Brazil)	10.20
	Dax McGill	(Hawaii)	7.00

Heat 4
1	C.Conlogue	(United States)	16.50
2	Keely Andrew	(Australia)	12.57
3	Coco Ho	(Hawaii)	12.57

Heat 5
1	Sally Fitzgibbons	(Australia)	13.44
2	Nikki Van Dijk	(Australia)	11.97
3	Laura Enever	(Australia)	7.76

Heat 6
1	Johanne Defay	(France)	16.60
2	Alessa Quizon	(Hawaii)	14.50
3	B. Buitendag	(South Africa)	2.20

== Round 2 ==
Heat 1: 1 / Coco Ho / (Hawaii) / 14.37; 2 / Dimity Stoyle / (Australia) / 11.57	Heat 2: 1 / Nikki Van Dijk / (Australia) / 13.94; 2 / Sage Erickson / (United States) / 11.96	Heat 3: 1 / Lakey Peterson / (United States) / 15.23; 2 / Dax McGill / (Hawaii) / 13.70

Heat 4: 1 / Tyler Wright / (Australia) / 17.20; 2 / Keely Andrew / (Australia) / 8.50	Heat 5: 1 / B. Buitendag / (South Africa) / 14.64; 2 / Laura Enever / (Australia) / 6.53	Heat 6: 1 / Alessa Quizon / (Hawaii) / 17.73; 2 / Silvana Lima / (Brazil) / 15.27

== Round 3 ==
Heat 1
1	Alessa Quizon	(Hawaii)	15.37
2	Lakey Peterson	(United States)	8.83
3	Tyler Wright	(Australia)	6.83

Heat 2
1	Carissa Moore	(Hawaii)	14.93
2	Malia Manuel	(Hawaii)	11.83
3	T. Weston-Webb	(Hawaii)	7.30

Heat 3
1	Nikki Van Dijk	(Australia)	14.10
2	C.Conlogue	(United States)	13.44
3	Johanne Defay	(France)	10.34

Heat 4
1	Sally Fitzgibbons	(Australia)	16.60
2	B. Buitendag	(South Africa)	11.67
3	Coco Ho	(Hawaii)	11.50

== Round 4 ==
Heat 1: 1 / T. Weston-Webb / (Hawaii) / 13.56; 2 / Lakey Peterson / (United States) / 12.13	Heat 2: 1 / Tyler Wright / (Australia) / 11.77; 2 / Malia Manuel / (Hawaii) / 10.67	Heat 3: 1 / Coco Ho / (Hawaii) / 16.50; 2 / C.Conlogue / (United States) / 14.26	Heat 4: 1 / B. Buitendag / (South Africa) / 16.07; 2 / Johanne Defay / (France) / 14.34

== Quarter finals ==
Heat 1: 1 / Alessa Quizon / (Hawaii) / 13.04; 2 / T. Weston-Webb / (Hawaii) / 11.50	Heat 2: 1 / Carissa Moore / (Hawaii) / 17.47; 2 / Tyler Wright / (Australia) / 14.94	Heat 3: 1 / Coco Ho / (Hawaii) / 16.90; 2 / Nikki Van Dijk / (Australia) / 16.20	Heat 4: 1 / Sally Fitzgibbons / (Australia) / 18.07; 2 / B. Buitendag / (South Africa) / 18.04

== Semi finals ==
Heat 1: 1 / Carissa Moore / (Hawaii) / 17.47; 2 / Alessa Quizon / (Hawaii) / 15.20	Heat 2: 1 / Sally Fitzgibbons / (Australia) / 18.20; 2 / Coco Ho / (Hawaii) / 14.40

== Final ==
Heat 1
1	Carissa Moore	(Hawaii)	17.90
2	Sally Fitzgibbons	(Australia)	17.90
