= Roxy Pro Gold Coast 2015 =

ASP World Tour event

The Roxy Pro Gold Coast 2015 was an event of the Association of Surfing Professionals for 2015 ASP World Tour.

This event was held from 28 February to 13 March at Gold Coast, (Queensland, Australia) and contested by 18 surfers.

The tournament was won by Carissa Moore (HAW), who beat Stephanie Gilmore (AUS) in final.

== Round 1 ==
Heat 1
1	Malia Manuel	(Hawaii)	13.80
2	Sage Erickson	(United States)	13.33
3	Johanne Defay	(France)	12.03

Heat 2
1	Sally Fitzgibbons	(Australia)	16.56
2	C.Conlogue	(United States)	16.30
3	Nikki Van Dijk	(Australia)	12.50

Heat 3
1	Silvana Lima	(Brazil)	18.16
2	S. Gilmore	(Australia)	14.00
3	Bronte Macaulay	(Australia)	9.73

Heat 4
1	Dimity Stoyle	(Australia)	11.76
2	Alessa Quizon	(Hawaii)	10.26
3	Tyler Wright	(Australia)	6.97

Heat 5
1	Carissa Moore	(Hawaii)	15.00
2	T. Weston-Webb	(Hawaii)	14.86
3	Laura Enever	(Australia)	12.00

Heat 6
1	Lakey Peterson	(United States)	15.40
2	Coco Ho	(Hawaii)	14.13
3	B. Buitendag	(South Africa)	12.63

== Round 2 ==
Heat 1: 1 / C.Conlogue / (United States) / 14.07; 2 / Sage Erickson / (United States) / 12.27	Heat 2: 1 / Nikki Van Dijk / (Australia) / 15.47; 2 / Johanne Defay / (France) / 14.77	Heat 3: 1 / S. Gilmore / (Australia) / 15.27; 2 / Bronte Macaulay / (Australia) / 12.00

Heat 4: 1 / Tyler Wright / (Australia) / 14.70; 2 / Alessa Quizon / (Hawaii) / 11.24	Heat 5: 1 / T. Weston-Webb / (Hawaii) / 15.93; 2 / B. Buitendag / (South Africa) / 11.07	Heat 6: 1 / Coco Ho / (Hawaii) / 16.16; 2 / Laura Enever / (Australia) / 13.27

== Round 3 ==
Heat 1
1	Malia Manuel	(Hawaii)	15.50
2	T. Weston-Webb	(Hawaii)	12.37
3	Sally Fitzgibbons	(Australia)	11.90

Heat 2
1	S. Gilmore	(Australia)	15.83
2	Silvana Lima	(Brazil)	15.40
3	Dimity Stoyle	(Australia)	9.64

Heat 3
1	Tyler Wright	(Australia)	17.20
2	C.Conlogue	(United States)	16.27
3	Coco Ho	(Hawaii)	15.33

Heat 4
1	Carissa Moore	(Hawaii)	16.10
2	Lakey Peterson	(United States)	14.90
3	Nikki Van Dijk	(Australia)	12.03

== Round 4 ==
Heat 1: 1 / T. Weston-Webb / (Hawaii) / 14.83; 2 / Dimity Stoyle / (Australia) / 14.73	Heat 2: 1 / Silvana Lima / (Brazil) / 17.73; 2 / Sally Fitzgibbons / (Australia) / 16.96	Heat 3: 1 / C.Conlogue / (United States) / 15.80; 2 / Nikki Van Dijk / (Australia) / 14.54	Heat 4: 1 / Lakey Peterson / (United States) / 12.53; 2 / Coco Ho / (Hawaii) / 12.34

== Quarter finals ==
Heat 1: 1 / T. Weston-Webb / (Hawaii) / 14.23; 2 / Malia Manuel / (Hawaii) / 11.93	Heat 2: 1 / S. Gilmore / (Australia) / 16.00; 2 / Silvana Lima / (Brazil) / 14.17	Heat 3: 1 / Tyler Wright / (Australia) / 15.33; 2 / C.Conlogue / (United States) / 13.40	Heat 4: 1 / Carissa Moore / (Hawaii) / 17.67; 2 / Lakey Peterson / (United States) / 15.03

== Semi finals ==
Heat 1: 1 / Stephanie Gilmore / (Australia) / 16.26; 2 / T. Weston-Webb / (Hawaii) / 11.53	Heat 2: 1 / Carissa Moore / (Hawaii) / 16.86; 2 / Tyler Wright / (Australia) / 16.06

== Final ==
Heat 1
1	Carissa Moore	(Hawaii)	18.43
2	Stephanie Gilmore	(Australia)	15.50
