= Roxy Pro France 2015 =

World Surf League 2015 France stage

Roxy Pro France 2015 at the Surf
- Location: Capbreton (Landes forest, FRA)
- Dates: 06 to 17 October
- Competitors: 18 from 7 nations

Medalists
gold medal	Tyler Wright	Australia
silver medal	T. Weston-Webb	Hawaii

The Roxy Pro France 2015 was an event of the Association of Surfing Professionals for the 2015 ASP World Tour.

This event was held from 06 to 17 October at Capbreton, in the Landes forest, (Aquitaine, France) and was contested by 18 female surfers.

The final of the tournament was won by Tyler Wright (AUS) winning $60,000 (USD), who beat T. Weston-Webb (HAW) earning $25,000 for second place.

== Round 1 ==
Heat 1
1	T. Weston-Webb	(Hawaii)	17.50
2	B. Buitendag	(South Africa)	9.84
3	Alessa Quizon	(Hawaii)	1.43

Heat 2
1	Dimity Stoyle	(Australia)	15.04
2	Lakey Peterson	(United States)	14.27
3	Malia Manuel	(Hawaii)	14.17

Heat 3
1	Coco Ho	(Hawaii)	17.93
2	C.Conlogue	(United States)	13.86
3	Chelsea Tuach	(Barbados)	7.16

Heat 4
1	Carissa Moore	(Hawaii)	18.77
2	S. Gilmore	(Australia)	12.66
3	Sage Erickson	(United States)	7.90

Heat 5
1	Nikki Van Dijk	(Australia)	13.67
2	Sally Fitzgibbons	(Australia)	10.93
3	Pauline Ado	(France)	10.43

Heat 6
1	Tyler Wright	(Australia)	16.90
2	Silvana Lima	(Brazil)	10.33
3	Johanne Defay	(France)	10.00

== Round 2 ==
Heat 1: 1 / Johanne Defay / (France) / 18.17; 2 / Silvana Lima / (Brazil) / 10.50	Heat 2: 1 / Alessa Quizon / (Hawaii) / 10.80; 2 / B. Buitendag / (South Africa) / 10.20	Heat 3: 1 / C.Conlogue / (United States) / 13.23; 2 / Chelsea Tuach / (Barbados) / 5.97

Heat 4: 1 / Sally Fitzgibbons / (Australia) / 12.43; 2 / Pauline Ado / (France) / 4.60	Heat 5: 1 / Sage Erickson / (United States) / 13.23; 2 / Lakey Peterson / (United States) / 7.76	Heat 6: 1 / S. Gilmore / (Australia) / 13.50; 2 / Malia Manuel / (Hawaii) / 14.17

== Round 3 ==
Heat 1
1	Johanne Defay	(France)	14.00
2	Tyler Wright	(Australia)	11.94
3	Sage Erickson	(United States)	7.24

Heat 2
1	Coco Ho	(Hawaii)	14.93
2	S. Gilmore	(Australia)	13.74
3	C.Conlogue	(United States)	13.10

Heat 3
1	Carissa Moore	(Hawaii)	15.23
2	Nikki Van Dijk	(Australia)	11.67
3	Alessa Quizon	(Hawaii)	9.34

Heat 4
1	T. Weston-Webb	(Hawaii)	17.94
2	Sally Fitzgibbons	(Australia)	16.00
3	Dimity Stoyle	(Australia)	15.80

== Round 4 ==
Heat 1: 1 / Tyler Wright / (Australia) / 14.90; 2 / C.Conlogue / (United States) / 14.60	Heat 2: 1 / Sage Erickson / (United States) / 14.27; 2 / S. Gilmore / (Australia) / 13.54	Heat 3: 1 / Nikki Van Dijk / (Australia) / 13.17; 2 / Dimity Stoyle / (Australia) / 8.50	Heat 4: 1 / Sally Fitzgibbons / (Australia) / 11.23; 2 / Alessa Quizon / (Hawaii) / 14.27

== Quarter finals ==
Heat 1: 1 / Tyler Wright / (Australia) / 16.33; 2 / Johanne Defay / (France) / 14.00	Heat 2: 1 / Sage Erickson / (United States) / 14.17; 2 / Coco Ho / (Hawaii) / 12.40	Heat 3: 1 / Carissa Moore / (Hawaii) / 17.00; 2 / Nikki Van Dijk / (Australia) / 16.57	Heat 4: 1 / T. Weston-Webb / (Hawaii) / 15.06; 2 / Sally Fitzgibbons / (Australia) / 11.23

== Semi finals ==
Heat 1: 1 / Tyler Wright / (Australia) / 6.87; 2 / Sage Erickson / (United States) / 4.43	Heat 2: 1 / T. Weston-Webb / (Hawaii) / 11.27; 1 / Carissa Moore / (Hawaii) / 3.83

== Final ==
Heat 1
1	Tyler Wright	(Australia)	17.10
2	T. Weston-Webb	(Hawaii)	10.93
