= Cascais Women's Pro Portugal 2015 =

Cascais Women's Pro Portugal 2015 at the Surf
- Location: Cascais (POR)
- Dates: 22 to 28 September
- Competitors: 18

Medalists
gold medal	C. Conlogue	United States
silver medal	Lakey Peterson	United States

The Cascais Women's Pro Portugal 2015 was an event organized by the Association of Surfing Professionals for the 2015 ASP World Tour. This event was held from 22 to 28 September at Cascais, (Portugal) and was contested by 18 surfers.

The tournament was won by C. Conlogue (USA), who beat Lakey Peterson (USA) in final.

== Round 1 ==
Heat 1
1	Alessa Quizon	(Hawaii)	11.44
2	T. Weston-Webb	(Hawaii)	10.17
3	Lakey Peterson	(United States)	9.77

Heat 2
1	Malia Manuel	(Hawaii)	12.13
2	B. Buitendag	(South Africa)	12.06
3	Laura Enever	(Australia)	8.40

Heat 3
1	Carissa Moore	(Hawaii)	14.83
2	Silvana Lima	(Brazil)	7.93
3	Teresa Bonvalot	(Portugal)	5.93

Heat 4
1	C. Conlogue	(United States)	15.00
2	Nikki Van Dijk	(Australia)	11.10
3	Pauline Ado	(France)	8.00

Heat 5
1	Sally Fitzgibbons	(Australia)	11.84
2	Coco Ho	(Hawaii)	10.30
3	Sage Erickson	(United States)	9.93

Heat 6
1	Dimity Stoyle	(Australia)	10.44
2	Johanne Defay	(France)	9.50
3	Tyler Wright	(Australia)	8.73

== Round 2 ==
Heat 1: 1 / T. Weston-Webb / (Hawaii) / 12.40; 2 / Silvana Lima / (Brazil) / 7.10	Heat 2: 1 / Johanne Defay / (France) / 12.67; 2 / Laura Enever / (Australia) / 6.73	Heat 3: 1 / B. Buitendag / (South Africa) / 13.00; 2 / Teresa Bonvalot / (Portugal) / 7.73

Heat 4: 1 / Lakey Peterson / (United States) / 10.67; 2 / Pauline Ado / (France) / 7.50	Heat 5: 1 / Tyler Wright / (Australia) / 16.10; 2 / Sage Erickson / (United States) / 9.16	Heat 6: 1 / Nikki Van Dijk / (Australia) / 12.60; 2 / Coco Ho / (Hawaii) / 10.26

== Round 3 ==
Heat 1
1	Alessa Quizon	(Hawaii)	11.57
2	Lakey Peterson	(United States)	11.17
3	B. Buitendag	(South Africa)	5.00

Heat 2
1	T. Weston-Webb	(Hawaii)	12.83
2	Malia Manuel	(Hawaii)	11.30
3	Carissa Moore	(Hawaii)	7.77

Heat 3
2	Nikki Van Dijk	(Australia)	9.17
3	Johanne Defay	(France)	11.40
1	Nikki Van Dijk	(Australia)	9.84

Heat 4
1	Sally Fitzgibbons	(Australia)	12.20
2	Tyler Wright	(Australia)	9.90
3	Dimity Stoyle	(Australia)	8.43

== Round 4 ==
Heat 1: 1 / Lakey Peterson / (United States) / 9.33; 2 / Carissa Moore / (Hawaii) / 7.73	Heat 2: 1 / Malia Manuel / (Hawaii) / 15.54; 2 / B. Buitendag / (South Africa) / 15.00	Heat 3: 1 / C. Conlogue / (United States) / 12.50; 2 / Dimity Stoyle / (Australia) / 11.66	Heat 4: 1 / Johanne Defay / (France) / 16.23; 2 / Tyler Wright / (Australia) / 10.34

== Quarter finals ==
Heat 1: 1 / Lakey Peterson / (United States) / 9.80; 1 / Alessa Quizon / (Hawaii) / 11.04	Heat 2: 1 / T. Weston-Webb / (Hawaii) / 12.00; 2 / Malia Manuel / (Hawaii) / 8.73	Heat 3: 1 / C. Conlogue / (United States) / 17.90; 2 / Nikki Van Dijk / (Australia) / 15.17	Heat 4: 1 / Sally Fitzgibbons / (Australia) / 16.43; 2 / Johanne Defay / (France) / 13.67

== Semi finals ==
Heat 1: 1 / Lakey Peterson / (United States) / 12.60; 2 / T. Weston-Webb / (Hawaii) / 10.34	Heat 2: 1 / C. Conlogue / (United States) / 11.30; 2 / Sally Fitzgibbons / (Australia) / 11.17

== Final ==
Heat 1
1	C. Conlogue	(United States)	16.10
2	Lakey Peterson	(United States)	12.34
