= Vans US Open of Surfing 2015 =

Vans US Open of Surfing
- Location: Huntington Beach, California, United States
- Dates: July 27 to August 2
- Competitors: 18 from 7 nations

Medalists
gold medal	Johanne Defay	France
silver medal	Sally Fitzgibbons	Australia

The Vans US Open of Surfing 2015 was an event of the Association of Surfing Professionals for 2015 ASP World Tour.

This event was held from July 27 to August 2 in Huntington Beach, California, United States.

The women's tournament was won by Johanne Defay of France, who beat Australian Sally Fitzgibbons in the final. The winner of the men's tournament was Hiroto Ohhara of Japan, with Tanner Hendrickson of Hawaii coming in second.

== Women ==
=== Round 1 ===
Heat 1
1	Malia Manuel	(Hawaii)	12.50
2	Dimity Stoyle	(Australia)	8.37
3	Tyler Wright	(Australia)	6.00

Heat 2
1	Coco Ho	(Hawaii)	15.50
2	Lakey Peterson	(United States)	14.50
3	Alessa Quizon	(Hawaii)	7.17

Heat 3
1	Nikki Van Dijk	(Australia)	13.50
2	Carissa Moore	(Hawaii)	12.87
3	Chelsea Tuach	(Barbados)	10.93

Heat 4
1	C.Conlogue	(United States)	14.50
2	Keely Andrew	(Australia)	13.33
3	Silvana Lima	(Brazil)	8.00

Heat 5
1	Johanne Defay	(France)	17.44
2	Sally Fitzgibbons	(Australia)	12.40
3	Sage Erickson	(United States)	10.03

Heat 6
1	T. Weston-Webb	(Hawaii)	14.43
2	Laura Enever	(Australia)	9.10
3	B. Buitendag	(South Africa)	7.83

=== Round 2 ===
Heat 1: 1 / B. Buitendag / (South Africa) / 12.50; 2 / Dimity Stoyle / (Australia) / 9.66	Heat 2: 1 / Alessa Quizon / (Hawaii) / 14.93; 2 / Tyler Wright / (Australia) / 9.70	Heat 3: 1 / Carissa Moore / (Hawaii) / 16.43; 2 / Chelsea Tuach / (Barbados) / 8.50

Heat 4: 1 / Sally Fitzgibbons / (Australia) / 16.10; 2 / Keely Andrew / (Australia) / 12.77	Heat 5: 1 / Lakey Peterson / (United States) / 16.53; 2 / Sage Erickson / (United States) / 14.60	Heat 6: 1 / Silvana Lima / (Brazil) / 12.80; 2 / Laura Enever / (Australia) / 12.17

=== Round 3 ===
Heat 1
1	Lakey Peterson	(United States)	15.07
2	Alessa Quizon	(Hawaii)	11.44
3	B. Buitendag	(South Africa)	8.73

Heat 2
1	Carissa Moore	(Hawaii)	16.03
2	Coco Ho	(Hawaii)	15.97
3	Johanne Defay	(France)	15.67

Heat 3
1	Malia Manuel	(Hawaii)	17.17
2	C.Conlogue	(United States)	14.10
3	Silvana Lima	(Brazil)	7.34

Heat 4
1	Sally Fitzgibbons	(Australia)	15.03
2	Nikki Van Dijk	(Australia)	14.86
3	T. Weston-Webb	(Hawaii)	10.57

=== Round 4 ===
Heat 1: 1 / Johanne Defay / (France) / 14.00; 2 / Alessa Quizon / (Hawaii) / 10.60	Heat 2: 1 / B. Buitendag / (South Africa) / 11.10; 2 / Coco Ho / (Hawaii) / 10.63	Heat 3: 1 / C.Conlogue / (United States) / 12.83; 2 / T. Weston-Webb / (Hawaii) / 10.33	Heat 4: 1 / Nikki Van Dijk / (Australia) / 14.97; 2 / Silvana Lima / (Brazil) / 12.10

=== Quarter finals ===
Heat 1: 1 / Johanne Defay / (France) / 13.80; 2 / Lakey Peterson / (United States) / 10.14	Heat 2: 1 / B. Buitendag / (South Africa) / 11.10; 2 / Carissa Moore / (Hawaii) / 10.60	Heat 3: 1 / C.Conlogue / (United States) / 16.43; 2 / Malia Manuel / (Hawaii) / 15.20	Heat 4: 1 / Sally Fitzgibbons / (Australia) / 15.23; 2 / Nikki Van Dijk / (Australia) / 10.03

=== Semi finals ===
Heat 1: 1 / Johanne Defay / (France) / 12.17; / B. Buitendag / (South Africa) / 12.16	Heat 2: 1 / Sally Fitzgibbons / (Australia) / 11.83; 2 / C.Conlogue / (United States) / 7.50

=== Final ===
Heat 1
1	Johanne Defay	(France)	13.54
2	Sally Fitzgibbons	(Australia)	111.83

== See also ==
- U.S. Open of Surfing
