= 2015 World Surf League =

Professional surfing league season

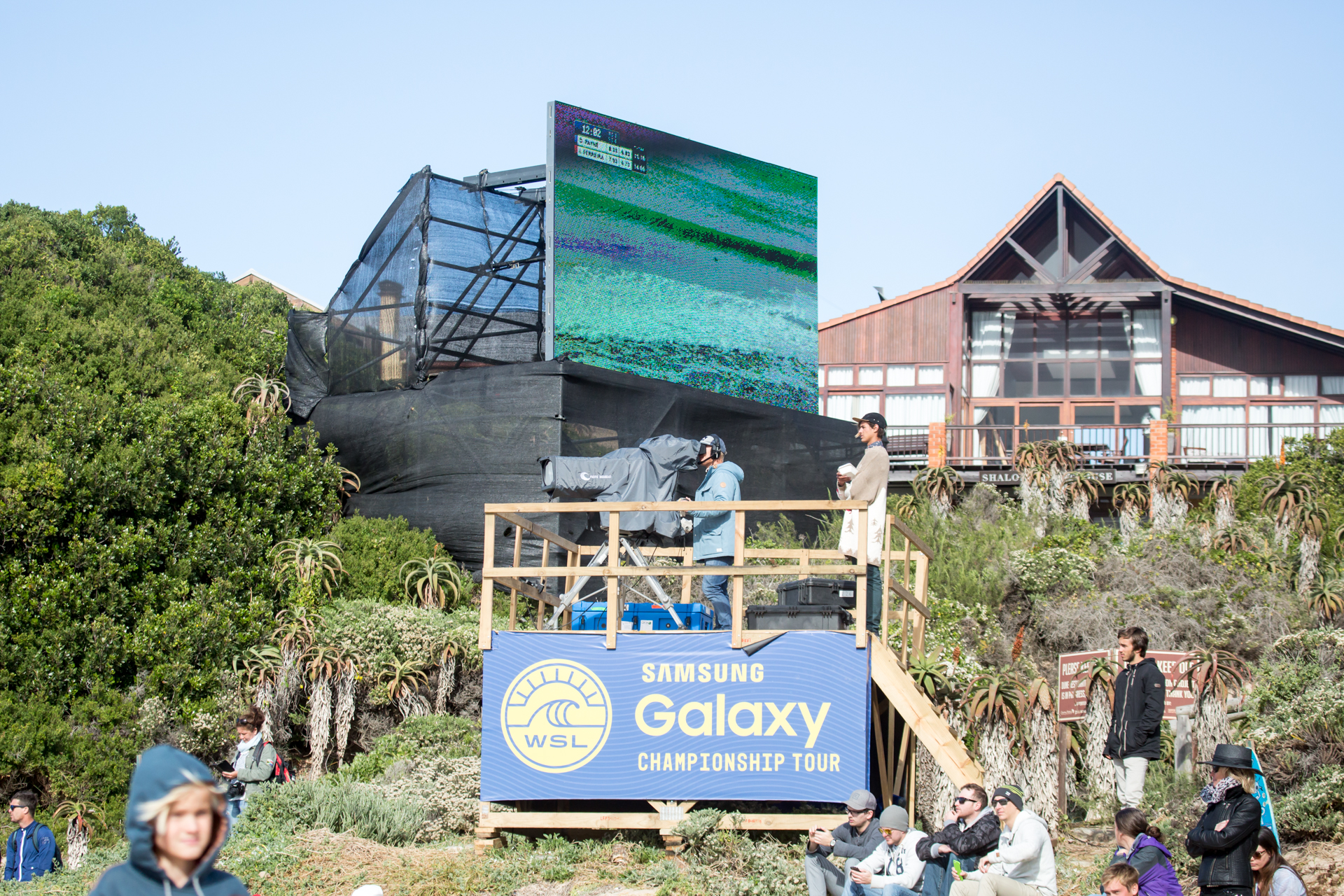
- Location: International
- Dates: late February to mid-December 2015

Champions
- Men: (Brazil) Adriano de Souza
- Women: (Hawaii) Carissa Moore

The 2015 ASP World Championship Tour (WCT) was the first year of the World Surf League, which grew out of the Association of Surfing Professionals. Men and women competed in separate tours with events taking place from late February to mid-December, at various surfing locations around the world. The surfer with the most points at the end of the tour (after discarding their two worst results) was named the 2015 ASP Surfing World Champion. Adriano de Souza of Brazil won the men's world title with 57,000 points. Carissa Moore of the USA won the women's world title with 66,200 points.

== 2015 Men's Championship Tour ==
=== Event results ===
Round	Event	Men's champion	Men's runner-up
1	(Australia) Quiksilver Pro Gold Coast	(Brazil) Filipe Toledo	(Australia) Julian Wilson
2	(Australia) Rip Curl Pro Bells Beach	(Australia) Mick Fanning	(Brazil) Adriano De Souza
3	(Australia) Drug Aware Margaret River Pro	(Brazil) Adriano De Souza	(Hawaii) John John Florence
4	(Brazil) Oi Rio Pro	(Brazil) Filipe Toledo	(Australia) Bede Durbidge
5	Fiji Pro	(Australia) Owen Wright	(Australia) Julian Wilson
6	(South Africa) J-Bay Open	–	(Australia) Mick Fanning, (Australia) Julian Wilson
7	(French Polynesia) Billabong Pro Tahiti	(France) Jérémy Florès	(Brazil) Gabriel Medina
8	(United States) Hurley Pro at Trestles	(Australia) Mick Fanning	(Brazil) Adriano De Souza
9	Quiksilver Pro France	(Brazil) Gabriel Medina	(Australia) Bede Durbidge
10	Moche Rip Curl Pro Portugal	(Brazil) Filipe Toledo	(Brazil) Italo Ferreira
11	(Hawaii) Billabong Pipe Masters	(Brazil) Adriano De Souza	(Brazil) Gabriel Medina

=== 2015 Men's Championship Tour Jeep Leaderboard ===
Points are awarded using the following structure:

Position	1st	2nd	3rd	5th	9th	13th	25th	INJ
Points	10,000	8,000	6,500	5,200	4,000	1,750	500	500

Ranking	+/-	Surfer	(Australia) WCT 1 (Details)	(Australia) WCT 2 (Details)	(Australia) WCT 3 (Details)	(Brazil) WCT 4 (Details)	(Fiji) WCT 5 (Details)	(South Africa) WCT 6 (Details)	(French Polynesia) WCT 7 (Details)	(United States) WCT 8 (Details)	(France) WCT 9 (Details)	(Portugal) WCT 10 (Details)	(Hawaii) WCT 11 (Details)	Points
1	▲2	Adriano De Souza (BRA)	3rd	2nd	1st	13th	13th	5th	13th	2nd	3rd	13th	1st	57,700
2	▼1	Mick Fanning (AUS)	5th	1st	13th	9th	9th	2nd	13th	1st	5th	13th	3rd	54,650
3	▲1	Gabriel Medina (BRA)	13th	5th	25th	13th	13th	5th	2nd	3rd	1st	5th	2nd	51,600
4	▼2	Filipe Toledo (BRA)	1st	5th	25th	1st	13th	13th	9th	3rd	25th	1st	13th	50,950
5	Steady	Owen Wright (AUS)	13th	5th	9th	5th	1st	13th	3rd	9th	5th	25th	INJ	43,600
6	▲1	Julian Wilson (AUS)	2nd	13th	5th	25th	2nd	2nd	13th	13th	3rd	25th	13th	42,700
7	▼1	Italo Ferreira (BRA)	9th	25th	13th	3rd	5th	13th	5th	9th	5th	2nd	13th	41,600
8	Steady	Jérémy Florès (FRA)	25th	9th	9th	13th	3rd	INJ	1st	13th	9th	5th	9th	41,200
9	Steady	Kelly Slater (USA)	13th	9th	5th	13th	9th	3rd	5th	9th	13th	13th	5th	37,600
10	Steady	Nat Young (USA)	13th	3rd	3rd	13th	13th	9th	25th	5th	13th	9th	25th	33,200
11	▲1	Josh Kerr (AUS)	13th	3rd	9th	5th	25th	13th	5th	13th	13th	13th	5th	33,100
12	▼1	Bede Durbidge (AUS)	5th	25th	25th	2nd	13th	13th	13th	13th	2nd	13th	13th	31,700
13	Steady	Joel Parkinson (AUS)	13th	9th	13th	25th	5th	13th	13th	5th	25th	5th	9th	30,600
14	▲1	John John Florence (HAW)	13th	13th	2nd	9th	INJ	INJ	13th	25th	5th	13th	9th	28,200
15	▼1	Wiggolly Dantas (BRA)	5th	25th	25th	13th	5th	9th	9th	5th	25th	25th	25th	26,850
16	Steady	Taj Burrow (AUS)	5th	13th	3rd	13th	3rd	25th	25th	13th	–	–	13th	26,200
17	▲1	Kai Otton (AUS)	25th	25th	13th	13th	5th	5th	5th	13th	13th	25th	13th	24,850
18	▼1	Matt Wilkinson (AUS)	9th	13th	25th	3rd	25th	13th	13th	13th	9th	13th	25th	23,750
19	Steady	Adrian Buchan (AUS)	25th	25th	13th	13th	13th	3rd	13th	5th	13th	25th	13th	22,700
20	▲1	Keanu Asing (HAW)	25th	13th	25th	9th	13th	9th	25th	25th	13th	9th	9th	22,250
21	▼1	Jadson Andre (BRA)	25th	9th	13th	5th	13th	25th	13th	25th	9th	25th	25th	19,950
21	Steady	Michel Bourez (PYF)	25th	25th	5th	INJ	INJ	9th	25th	13th	13th	9th	13th	19,950
23	▲3	C. J. Hobgood (USA)	25th	25th	25th	25th	25th	13th	3rd	25th	13th	13th	5th	18,950
23	▲3	Adam Melling (AUS)	25th	13th	13th	13th	9th	13th	25th	13th	25th	25th	5th	18,950
25	▼2	Kolohe Andino (USA)	13th	13th	25th	25th	13th	13th	25th	13th	9th	9th	25th	17,750
26	▼2	Sebastian Zietz (HAW)	13th	13th	9th	13th	13th	25th	13th	25th	25th	13th	13th	16,750
27	▼2	Miguel Pupo (BRA)	3rd	25th	13th	25th	25th	25th	25th	9th	25th	25th	25th	15,250
28	▲1	Jordy Smith (ZAF)	9th	5th	13th	25h	INJ	25th	INJ	INJ	INJ	INJ	13th	15,200
29	▼1	Brett Simpson (USA)	25th	13th	25th	25th	INJ	25th	13th	25th	13th	3rd	25th	14,250
30	▲3	Glenn Hall (IRL)	9th	25th	13th	25th	25th	25th	25th	13th	25th	25th	13th	11,750
31	▼1	Ricardo Christie (NZL)	25th	25th	13th	5th	25th	25th	25th	25th	25th	13th	25th	11,700
32	▼1	Freddy Patacchia Jr. (HAW)	13th	13th	13th	25th	13th	13th	25th	13th	–	–	–	11,500
33	▼1	Matt Banting (AUS)	13th	13th	25th	9th	25th	INJ	INJ	INJ	INJ	INJ	INJ	10,500
34	▲8	Mason Ho (HAW)	–	13th	–	–	–	–	–	–	–	13th	3rd	10,000
35	▼1	Alejo Muniz (BRA)	–	–	25th	25th	13th	5th	–	–	25th	–		8,450
36	▼1	Dusty Payne (HAW)	13th	25th	25th	13th	25th	25th	13th	25th	25th	INJ	25th	8,250
37	▼1	Dane Reynolds (USA)	25th	–	–	–	9th	13th	–	–	13th	–		8,000
38	▼1	Vasco Ribeiro (PRT)	–	–	–	–	–	–	–	–	–	3rd		6,500
39	▼1	Aritz Aranburu (SPA)	–	–	–	–	25th	–	9th	25th	25th	25th		6,000
40	▼1	Jay Davies (AUS)	–	–	5th	–	25th	–	–	–	–	–		5,700
41	▼1	Frederico Morais (PRT)	–	–	–	–	–	–	–	–	–	5th		5,200
42	▼1	Bruno Santos (BRA)	–	–	–	–	–	–	9th	–	–	–		4,000
43	Steady	Tomas Hermes (BRA)	–	–	–	–	–	25th	–	25th	13th	25th		3.250
44	Steady	Caio Ibelli (BRA)	–	–	–	–	–	–	–	–	25th	13th		2,250
45	Steady	Maxime Huscenot (FRA)	–	–	–	–	–	–	–	–	13th	–		1,750
45	▲13	Jamie O'Brien (HAW)	–	–	–	–	–	–	–	–	–	–	13th	1,750
47	▼1	Jack Freestone (AUS)	25th	–	–	–	–	–	–	–	–	–		500
47	▼1	Joe Van Dijk (AUS)	–	25th	–	–	–	–	–	–	–	–		500
47	▼1	Alex Ribeiro (BRA)	–	–	–	25th	–	–	–	–	–	–		500
47	▼1	David do Carmo (BRA)	–	–	–	25th	–	–	–	–	–	–		500
47	▼1	Aca Ravulo (FJI)	–	–	–	–	25th	–	–	–	–	–		500
47	▼1	Inia Nakalevu (FJI)	–	–	–	–	25th	–	–	–	–	–		500
47	▼1	Slade Prestwich (ZAF)	–	–	–	–	–	25th	–	–	–	–		500
47	▼1	Michel February (ZAF)	–	–	–	–	–	25th	–	–	–	–		500
47	▼1	Taumata Puhetini (PYF)	–	–	–	–	–	–	25th	–	–	–		500
47	▼1	Garrett Parkes (AUS)	–	–	–	–	–	–	25th	–	–	–		500
47	▼1	Hiroto Ohhara (JPN)	–	–	–	–	–	–	–	25th	–	–		500
47	▼1	Ian Crane (USA)	–	–	–	–	–	–	–	25th	–	–		500
47	▼1	Tiago Pires (PRT)	–	–	–	–	–	–	–	–	–	25th		500
47	Steady	Wade Carmichael (AUS)	–	–	–	–	–	–	–	–	–	–	25th	500
47	Steady	Jack Robinson (AUS)	–	–	–	–	–	–	–	–	–	–	25th	500
47	Steady	Bruce Irons (HAW)	–	–	–	–	–	–	–	–	–	–	25th	500

- Championship Tour surfers best 9 of 11 results are combined to equal their final point total.
- Tournament results discarded

Legend

Champion
WQS 2016

== 2015 Women's Championship Tour ==
=== Event results ===
Round	Event	Men's champion	Men's runner-up
1	(Australia) Roxy Pro Gold Coast	(Hawaii) Carissa Moore	(Australia) Stephanie Gilmore
2	(Australia) Rip Curl Women's Pro Bells Beach	(Hawaii) Carissa Moore	(Australia) Stephanie Gilmore
3	(Australia) Women's Drug Aware Margaret River Pro	(United States) Courtney Conlogue	(Hawaii) Carissa Moore
4	(Brazil) Oi Rio Women's Pro	(United States) Courtney Conlogue	(South Africa) Bianca Buitendag
5	Fiji Women's Pro	(Australia) Sally Fitzgibbons	(South Africa) Bianca Buitendag
6	(United States) Women's Vans US Open of Surfing	(France) Johanne Defay	(Australia) Sally Fitzgibbons
7	(United States) Swatch Women's Pro	(Hawaii) Carissa Moore	(South Africa) Bianca Buitendag
8	(Portugal) Cascais Women's Pro	(United States) Courtney Conlogue	(United States) Lakey Peterson
9	Roxy Pro France	(Australia) Tyler Wright	(Hawaii) Tatiana Weston-Webb
10	(Hawaii) Target Maui Pro	(Hawaii) Carissa Moore	(Australia) Sally Fitzgibbons

=== 2015 Women's Championship Tour Jeep Leaderboard ===
Points are awarded using the following structure:

Position	1st	2nd	3rd	5th	9th	13th	INJ	DNC
Points	10,000	8,000	6,500	5,200	3,300	1,750	1,750	0

Ranking	+/-	Surfer	(Australia) WCT 1 (Details)	(Australia) WCT 2 (Details)	(Australia) WCT 3 (Details)	(Brazil) WCT 4 (Details)	(Fiji) WCT 5 (Details)	(United States) WCT 6 (Details)	(United States) WCT 7 (Details)	(Portugal) WCT 8 (Details)	(France) WCT 9 (Details)	(Hawaii) WCT 10 (Details)	Points
1	Steady	Carissa Moore (HAW)	1st	1st	2nd	3rd	9th	5th	1st	9th	3rd	1st	66,200
2	Steady	Courtney Conlogue (USA)	5th	3rd	1st	1st	5th	3rd	5th	1st	9th	9th	58,600
3	Steady	Sally Fitzgibbons (AUS)	9th	3rd	3rd	9th	1st	2nd	5th	3rd	5th	2nd	55,900
4	▲2	Bianca Buitendag (ZAF)	13th	9th	5th	2nd	2nd	3rd	2nd	9th	13th	5th	47,500
5	Steady	Tyler Wright (AUS)	3rd	5th	5th	3rd	9th	13th	5th	9th	1st	5th	47,100
6	▼2	Lakey Peterson (USA)	5th	5th	5th	5th	3rd	5th	3rd	2nd	13th	9th	47,000
7	▲1	Tatiana Weston-Webb (HAW)	3rd	9th	5th	9th	5th	9th	9th	3rd	2nd	5th	43,200
8	▼1	Johanne Defay (FRA)	13th	5th	9th	9th	3rd	1st	9th	5th	5th	9th	42,000
9	▲1	Nikki Van Dijk (AUS)	9th	13th	13th	13th	5th	5th	5th	5th	5th	5th	36,250
10	▼1	Malia Manuel (HAW)	5th	13th	3rd	5th	9th	5th	13th	5th	13th	9th	35,650
11	Steady	Coco Ho (HAW)	9th	5th	9th	5th	9th	9th	13th	13th	5th	3rd	35,300
12	Steady	Stephanie Gilmore (AUS)	2nd	2nd	9th	INJ	INJ	INJ	INJ	INJ	13th	INJ	29,600
13	Steady	Alessa Quizon (HAW)	13th	9th	13th	13th	13th	9th	9th	5th	9th	3rd	28,400
14	Steady	Silvana Lima (BRA)	5th	9th	9th	9th	13th	9th	13th	13th	13th	13th	23,650
15	Steady	Dimity Stoyle (AUS)	9th	13th	13th	13th	13th	13th	3rd	9th	9th	13th	23,400
16	Steady	Sage Erickson (USA)	13th	13th	13th	13th	13th	13th	9th	13th	3rd	13th	20,300
17	Steady	Laura Enever (AUS)	13th	13th	13th	13th	5th	13th	13th	13th	DNC	13th	17,450
18	Steady	Keely Andrew (AUS)	–	–	–	5th	13th	13th	–	–	–	13th	8,700
19	Steady	Pauline Ado (FRA)	–	13th	–	–	–	–	–	13th	13th	–	5,250
20	Steady	Chelsea Tuach (BRB)	–	–	–	–	–	13th	–	–	13th	–	3,500
21	▼1	Bronte Macaulay (AUS)	13th	–	–	–	–	–	–	–	–	–	1,750
21	▼1	Claire Bevilacqua (AUS)	–	–	13th	–	–	–	–	–	–	–	1,750
21	▼1	Luana Coutinho (BRA)	–	–	–	13th	–	–	–	–	–	–	1,750
21	▼1	Mahina Maeda (HAW)	–	–	–	–	13th	–	–	–	–	–	1,750
21	▼1	Bethany Hamilton (HAW)	–	–	–	–	–	–	13th	–	–	–	1,750
21	▼1	Caroline Marks (USA)	–	–	–	–	–	–	13th	–	–	–	1,750
21	▼1	Teresa Bonvalot (PRT)	–	–	–	–	–	–	–	13th	–	–	1,750

- Championship Tour surfers best 8 of 10 results are combined to equal their final point total.
- Tournament results discarded

Legend

Champion
WQS 2016
two worst results

== Qualifying Series ==
=== MQS ===
Position	1st	2nd	3rd–4th	5th–8th	9th

Ranking	+/-	Surfer	Events					Points
Ranking	+/-	Surfer	1	2	3	4	5	Points
1	Steady	Caio Ibelli (BRA)	8.000	6.500	6.500	5.200	3.800	30.000
2	▲1	Kolohe Andino (USA)	10.000	6.000	5.200	5.200	2.100	28.500
2	▼1	Jack Freestone (AUS)	10.000	6.500	4.500	3.800	3.700	28.500
4	Steady	Miguel Pupo (BRA)	10.000	6.500	3.700	3.700	2.200	26.100
5	Steady	Filipe Toledo (BRA)	10.000	8.000	6.500	1.000		25.500
6	Steady	Alejo Muniz (BRA)	10.000	6.000	3.700	2.200	1.550	23.450
7	Steady	Kanoa Igarashi (USA)	6.500	6.000	5.200	3.000	2.650	23.350
8	Steady	Alex Ribeiro (BRA)	10.000	5.200	3.700	2.100	1.550	22.550
9	▲5	Conner Coffin (USA)	5.300	5.200	3.700	3.700	3.550	21.450
10	▼1	Davey Cathels (AUS)	8.000	8.000	2.200	1.550	1.550	21.300
10	▼1	Ryan Callinan (AUS)	5.300	5.200	3.700	3.550	3.550	21.300
12	▲4	Stuart Kennedy (AUS)	5.100	4.500	3.700	3.600	3.550	20.450
13	▼2	Jeremy Flores (FRA)	8.000	8.000	2.300	1.000	600	19.900
13	▲3	Dusty Payne (HAW)	6.500	6.300	3.800	2.200	1.100	19.900

Legend

WCT 2016

=== WQS ===
Position	1st	2nd	3rd–4th	5th–8th	9th

Ranking	+/-	Surfer	Events					Points
Ranking	+/-	Surfer	1	2	3	4	5	Points
1	Steady	Tatiana Weston-Webb (HAW)	6.000	3.550	3.550	2.650	2.650	18.400
1	Steady	Sage Erickson (USA)	6.000	3.550	3.550	2.650	2.650	18.400
3	Steady	Nikki Van Dijk (AUS)	6.000	3.550	3.550	3.550	1.550	18.200
4	▲8	Chelsea Tuach (BRB)	6.000	3.550	2.650	1.050	1.050	14.300
5	▼1	Keely Andrew (AUS)	6.000	4.500	1.550	1.050	1.050	14.150
6	▲2	Alessa Quizon (HAW)	3.550	2.650	2.650	2.650	1.550	13.050
6	▲5	Malia Manuel (HAW)	3.550	2.650	2.650	2.650	1.550	13.050
8	▼3	Coco Ho (HAW)	4.500	2.650	2.650	1.550	1.550	12.900
9	Steady	Laura Enever (AUS)	6.000	2.650	1.550	1.550	1.050	124.800

Legend

WCT 2016
