= Rip Curl Pro 2015 =

Surfing competition in Victoria, Australia

The Rip Curl Pro 2015 was an event of the Association of Surfing Professionals for 2015 ASP World Tour.

This event was held from 1 to 12 April at Bells Beach, (Victoria, Australia) and contested by 36 surfers.

The tournament was won by Mick Fanning (AUS), who beat Adriano De Souza (BRA) in final.

== Round 1 ==
Heat 1
1	Jérémy Florès	(France)	15.33
2	Wiggolly Dantas	(Brazil)	11.73
3	Taj Burrow	(Australia)	10.63

Heat 2
1	Brett Simpson	(United States)	15.00
2	A. de Souza	(Brazil)	14.33
3	Kai Otton	(Australia)	6.00

Heat 3
1	Kelly Slater	(United States)	16.67
2	Sebastian Zietz	(Hawaii)	9.06
3	Ricardo Christie	(New Zealand)	7.73

Heat 4
1	John Florence	(Hawaii)	15.33
2	Italo Ferreira	(Brazil)	11.47
3	C. J. Hobgood	(United States)	10.17

Heat 5
1	Mason Ho	(Hawaii)	13.13
2	Mick Fanning	(Australia)	13.10
3	F. Patacchia	(Hawaii)	13.00

Heat 6
1	Gabriel Medina	(Brazil)	12.76
2	Matt Banting	(Australia)	11.83
3	Joe Van Dijk	(Australia)	8.23

Heat 7
1	Jordy Smith	(South Africa)	14.33
2	Keanu Asing	(Hawaii)	13.44
3	Adrian Buchan	(Australia)	12.20

Heat 8
1	Nat Young	(United States)	11.50
2	Michel Bourez	(French Polynesia)	9.50
3	Dusty Payne	(Hawaii)	6.20

Heat 9
1	Joel Parkinson	(Australia)	12.33
2	Glenn Hall	(Republic of Ireland)	8.74
3	Miguel Pupo	(Brazil)	7.67

Heat 10
1	Josh Kerr	(Australia)	10.80
2	Bede Durbidge	(Australia)	13.77
3	Adan Melling	(Australia)	9.94

Heat 11
1	Owen Wright	(Australia)	13.90
2	Jadson Andre	(Brazil)	11.63
3	Filipe Toledo	(Brazil)	9.86

Heat 12
1	Julian Wilson	(Australia)	14.47
2	Kolohe Andino	(United States)	14.37
3	Matt Wilkinson	(Australia)	8.57

== Round 2 ==
Heat 1: 1 / Mick Fanning / (Australia) / 11.00; 2 / Joe Van Dijk / (Australia) / 8.84	Heat 2: 1 / A. de Souza / (Brazil) / 16.27; 2 / C. J. Hobgood / (United States) / 15.54	Heat 3: 1 / Taj Burrow / (Australia) / 17.27; 2 / Ricardo Christie / (New Zealand) / 15.27	Heat 4: 1 / Keanu Asing / (Hawaii) / 14.66; 2 / Michel Bourez / (French Polynesia) / 5.54

Heat 5: 1 / Filipe Toledo / (Brazil) / 17.10; 2 / Dusty Payne / (Hawaii) / 15.10	Heat 6: 1 / Kolohe Andino / (United States) / 11.00; 2 / Glenn Hall / (Republic of Ireland) / 8.10	Heat 7: 1 / Adan Melling / (Australia) / 16.17; 2 / Bede Durbidge / (Australia) / 16.00	Heat 8: 1 / Jadson Andre / (Brazil) / 12.33; 2 / Miguel Pupo / (Brazil) / 10.17

Heat 9: 1 / Matt Wilkinson / (Australia) / 14.67; 2 / Adrian Buchan / (Australia) / 8.66	Heat 10: 1 / Matt Banting / (Australia) / 14.60; 2 / Wiggolly Dantas / (Brazil) / 11.84	Heat 11: 1 / F. Patacchia / (Hawaii) / 12.43; 2 / Kai Otton / (Australia) / 11.80	Heat 12: 1 / Sebastian Zietz / (Hawaii) / 17.24; 2 / Italo Ferreira / (Brazil) / 11.10

== Round 3 ==
Heat 1: 1 / Kelly Slater / (United States) / 16.90; 2 / Keanu Asing / (Hawaii) / 14.33	Heat 2: 1 / Josh Kerr / (Australia) / 14.93; 2 / F. Patacchia / (Hawaii) / 14.00	Heat 3: 1 / A. de Souza / (Brazil) / 15.67; 2 / Adan Melling / (Australia) / 13.44	Heat 4: 1 / Joel Parkinson / (Australia) / 14.84; 2 / Matt Banting / (Australia) / 13.00

Heat 5: 1 / Owen Wright / (Australia) / 16.10; 2 / Kolohe Andino / (United States) / 14.76	Heat 6: 1 / Gabriel Medina / (Brazil) / 10.00; 2 / Mason Ho / (Hawaii) / 8.10	Heat 7: 1 / Mick Fanning / (Australia) / 16.84; 2 / Brett Simpson / (United States) / 13.46	Heat 8: 1 / Nat Young / (United States) / 14.37; 2 / Julian Wilson / (Australia) / 12.73

Heat 9: 1 / Jordy Smith / (South Africa) / 14.03; 2 / Matt Wilkinson / (Australia) / 7.90	Heat 10: 1 / Jadson Andre / (Brazil) / 13.87; 2 / Taj Burrow / (Australia) / 7.00	Heat 11: 1 / Filipe Toledo / (Brazil) / 18.57; 2 / Sebastian Zietz / (Hawaii) / 15.10	Heat 12: 1 / Jérémy Florès / (France) / 11.00; 2 / John Florence / (Hawaii) / 10.76

== Round 4 ==
Heat 1
1	A. de Souza	(Brazil)	17.46
2	Kelly Slater	(United States)	15.93
3	Josh Kerr	(Australia)	12.43

Heat 2
1	Owen Wright	(Australia)	15.97
2	Joel Parkinson	(Australia)	15.70
3	Gabriel Medina	(Brazil)	11.96

Heat 3
1	Jordy Smith	(South Africa)	15.97
2	Mick Fanning	(Australia)	15.17
3	Nat Young	(United States)	13.96

Heat 4
1	Filipe Toledo	(Brazil)	13.47
2	Jérémy Florès	(France)	13.17
3	Jadson Andre	(Brazil)	11.90

== Round 5 ==
Heat 1: 1 / Gabriel Medina / (Brazil) / 13.00; 2 / Kelly Slater / (United States) / 12.53	Heat 2: 1 / Josh Kerr / (Australia) / 10.40; 2 / Joel Parkinson / (Australia) / 10.17	Heat 3: 1 / Mick Fanning / (Australia) / 12.27; 2 / Jadson Andre / (Brazil) / 11.60	Heat 4: 1 / Nat Young / (United States) / 14.66; 2 / Jérémy Florès / (France) / 5.93

== Quarter finals ==
Heat 1: 1 / A. de Souza / (Brazil) / 11.60; 2 / Gabriel Medina / (Brazil) / 8.33	Heat 2: 1 / Josh Kerr / (Australia) / 13.00; 2 / Owen Wright / (Australia) / 7.93	Heat 3: 1 / Mick Fanning / (Australia) / 17.76; 2 / Jordy Smith / (South Africa) / 15.60	Heat 4: 1 / Nat Young / (United States) / 15.10; 2 / Filipe Toledo / (Brazil) / 13.86

== Semi finals ==
Heat 1: 1 / A. de Souza / (Brazil) / 14.84; / Josh Kerr / (Australia) / 9.87	Heat 2: 1 / Mick Fanning / (Australia) / 16.70; 2 / Nat Young / (United States) / 14.23

== Final ==
Heat 1
1	Mick Fanning	(Australia)	15.27 (8.17)
2	A. de Souza	(Brazil)	15.27 (7.77)
