= Quiksilver Pro Gold Coast 2015 =

The Quiksilver Pro Gold Coast 2015 was an event of the Association of Surfing Professionals for 2015 ASP World Tour.

This event was held from 28 February to 13 March at Gold Coast, (Queensland, Australia) and contested by 36 surfers.

The tournament was won by Filipe Toledo (BRA), who beat Julian Wilson (AUS) in final.

== Round 1 ==
Heat 1
1	Joel Parkinson	(Australia)	15.16
2	Brett Simpson	(United States)	11.87
3	Miguel Pupo	(Brazil)	11.00

Heat 2
1	Sebastian Zietz	(Hawaii)	14.60
2	Michel Bourez	(French Polynesia)	14.44
3	Ricardo Christie	(New Zealand)	8.94

Heat 3
1	F. Patacchia	(Hawaii)	17.06
2	Kelly Slater	(United States)	14.44
3	C. J. Hobgood	(United States)	12.50

Heat 4
1	John Florence	(Hawaii)	16.80
2	Glenn Hall	(Republic of Ireland)	12.84
3	Jadson Andre	(Brazil)	12.57

Heat 5
1	Matt Banting	(Australia)	17.76
2	Mick Fanning	(Australia)	17.06
3	Jack Freestone	(Australia)	15.83

Heat 6
1	Gabriel Medina	(Brazil)	18.30
2	Wiggolly Dantas	(Brazil)	16.93
3	Dane Reynolds	(United States)	8.27

Heat 7
1	Jordy Smith	(South Africa)	16.14
2	Kai Otton	(Australia)	15.03
3	Jérémy Florès	(France)	12.67

Heat 8
1	Dusty Payne	(Hawaii)	16.34
2	A. de Souza	(Brazil)	12.53
3	Filipe Toledo	(Brazil)	11.66

Heat 9
1	Bede Durbidge	(Australia)	17.10
2	Taj Burrow	(Australia)	15.80
3	Keanu Asing	(Hawaii)	12.43

Heat 10
1	Matt Wilkinson	(Australia)	13.44
2	Adrian Buchan	(Australia)	5.04
3	Josh Kerr	(Australia)	4.10

Heat 11
1	Julian Wilson	(Australia)	15.43
2	Italo Ferreira	(Brazil)	14.97
3	Kolohe Andino	(United States)	10.43

Heat 12
1	Nat Young	(United States)	15.80
2	Adan Melling	(Australia)	10.30
3	Owen Wright	(Australia)	9.10

== Round 2 ==
Heat 1: 1 / Mick Fanning / (Australia) / 15.50; 2 / Dane Reynolds / (United States) / 9.43	Heat 2: 1 / Kelly Slater / (United States) / 13.33; 2 / Jack Freestone / (Australia) / 10.63	Heat 3: 1 / Glenn Hall / (Republic of Ireland) / 12.77; 2 / Michel Bourez / (French Polynesia) / 11.67	Heat 4: 1 / A. de Souza / (Brazil) / 13.83; 2 / C. J. Hobgood / (United States) / 11.00

Heat 5: 1 / Taj Burrow / (Australia) / 15.17; 2 / Ricardo Christie / (New Zealand) / 9.84	Heat 6: 1 / Josh Kerr / (Australia) / 12.74; 2 / Brett Simpson / (United States) / 10.40	Heat 7: 1 / Kolohe Andino / (United States) / 15.83; 2 / Jérémy Florès / (France) / 15.53	Heat 8: 1 / Owen Wright / (Australia) / 16.60; 2 / Keanu Asing / (Hawaii) / 12.33

Heat 9: 1 / Italo Ferreira / (Brazil) / 11.67; 2 / Adrian Buchan / (Australia) / 11.10	Heat 10: 1 / Filipe Toledo / (Brazil) / 16.47; 2 / Adan Melling / (Australia) / 13.10	Heat 11: 1 / Wiggolly Dantas / (Brazil) / 14.16; 2 / Kai Otton / (Australia) / 13.93	Heat 12: 1 / Miguel Pupo / (Brazil) / 14.10; 2 / Jadson Andre / (Brazil) / 10.00

== Round 3 ==
Heat 1: 1 / Italo Ferreira / (Brazil) / 13.00; 2 / Kelly Slater / (United States) / 8.77	Heat 2: 1 / Miguel Pupo / (Brazil) / 13.67; 2 / Josh Kerr / (Australia) / 13.20	Heat 3: 1 / Wiggolly Dantas / (Brazil) / 15.77; 2 / Joel Parkinson / (Australia) / 9.93	Heat 4: 1 / Taj Burrow / (Australia) / 16.60; 2 / Sebastian Zietz / (Hawaii) / 11.90

Heat 5: 1 / Julian Wilson / (Australia) / 10.43; 2 / Nat Young / (United States) / 8.94	Heat 6: 1 / Glenn Hall / (Republic of Ireland) / 14.23; 2 / Gabriel Medina / (Brazil) / 7.50	Heat 7: 1 / Mick Fanning / (Australia) / 17.56; 2 / Dusty Payne / (Hawaii) / 15.00	Heat 8: 1 / Bede Durbidge / (Australia) / 15.90; 2 / Owen Wright / (Australia) / 14.44

Heat 9: 1 / A. de Souza / (Brazil) / 14.76; 2 / F. Patacchia / (Hawaii) / 1.13	Heat 10: 1 / Jordy Smith / (South Africa) / 14.67; 2 / Matt Banting / (Australia) / 13.90	Heat 11: 1 / Filipe Toledo / (Brazil) / 18.50; 2 / Kolohe Andino / (United States) / 15.74	Heat 12: 1 / Matt Wilkinson / (Australia) / 17.83; 2 / John Florence / (Hawaii) / 16.13

== Round 4 ==
Heat 1
1	Miguel Pupo	(Brazil)	17.23
2	Wiggolly Dantas	(Brazil)	13.47
3	Italo Ferreira	(Brazil)	13.37

Heat 2
1	Julian Wilson	(Australia)	15.73
2	Taj Burrow	(Australia)	11.13
3	Glenn Hall	(Republic of Ireland)	10.50

Heat 3
1	Mick Fanning	(Australia)	16.50
2	A. de Souza	(Brazil)	16.50
3	Bede Durbidge	(Australia)	14.50

Heat 4
1	Filipe Toledo	(Brazil)	17.84
2	Jordy Smith	(South Africa)	16.57
3	Matt Wilkinson	(Australia)	12.23

== Round 5 ==
Heat 1: 1 / Wiggolly Dantas / (Brazil) / 17.34; 2 / Glenn Hall / (Republic of Ireland) / 13.33	Heat 2: 1 / Taj Burrow / (Australia) / 15.73; 2 / Italo Ferreira / (Brazil) / 15.50	Heat 3: 1 / A. de Souza / (Brazil) / 16.94; 2 / Matt Wilkinson / (Australia) / 16.07	Heat 4: 1 / Bede Durbidge / (Australia) / 15.83; 2 / Jordy Smith / (South Africa) / 11.83

== Quarter finals ==
Heat 1: 1 / Miguel Pupo / (Brazil) / 13.70; 2 / Wiggolly Dantas / (Brazil) / 13.67	Heat 2: 1 / Julian Wilson / (Australia) / 17.44; 2 / Taj Burrow / (Australia) / 11.17	Heat 3: 1 / A. de Souza / (Brazil) / 15.07; 2 / Mick Fanning / (Australia) / 13.23	Heat 4: 1 / Filipe Toledo / (Brazil) / 17.34; 2 / Bede Durbidge / (Australia) / 16.23

== Semi finals ==
Heat 1: 1 / Julian Wilson / (Australia) / 16.26; 2 / Miguel Pupo / (Brazil) / 15.60	Heat 2: 1 / Filipe Toledo / (Brazil) / 17.23; 2 / Adriano De Souza / (Brazil) / 10.34

== Final ==
Heat 1
1	Filipe Toledo	(Brazil)	19.60
2	Julian Wilson	(Australia)	14.70
