= Michael Ho (surfer) =

Professional surfer

Michael Ho (born July 13, 1957) is a Hawaiian Chinese professional surfer who has won the Hawaiian Triple Crown, the Duke Classic, the World Cup, and the 1982 Pipe Masters. He is the brother of Derek Ho, another champion surfer. Michael is also the father of Women's World Tour surfer Coco Ho and Mason Ho - "The World’s Most Entertaining Surfer". The Ho brothers have Chinese, native Hawaiian, and American European roots. Their father Edmund "Chico" Ho is half Chinese and half Native Hawaiian while their mother Joeine Ho is of American European descent. Their paternal grandfather moved to Hawaii in 1892 from China.

Ho was born in San Mateo, California. He became one of Hawaii's first full-time professional surfers, and in 1975 finished runner-up in the Duke Kahanamoku Classic and the Pro Class Trials. Ho was already being called the world's finest "position" surfer, meaning he invariably placed himself in the most critical section of the wave using the simplest and cleanest line. He often rode with a ramrod straight back, knees apart, his right arm distinctively held out from his body, hand dangling at the wrist. (Younger brother Derek Ho, the 1993 world champion, surfed in much the same way.)

At 5'5", 135 pounds, Ho was never able to explode through a turn the way his heavier peers could, but nobody was quicker on their feet, and few were as innately stylish. He was one of the world's best tuberiders in the mid- and late '70s (he helped invent the "pigdog" tuberiding technique), and his skills only improved throughout the '80s. Gregarious around friends and family, the mustachioed Ho kept a wary distance from the rest of the surf world, and was a somewhat shadowy figure during his 13 years (1976–88) on the pro tour.

Ho performed well at world tour venues around the world, but never won a pro circuit event outside of Hawaii. On the North Shore, however, he was a competitive force for more than 25 years: a five-time Pipeline Masters finalist (winning in 1982, even though hobbled by a cast on his right wrist); an eight-time Duke finalist (winning in 1978 and 1981); a four-time winner of the Xcel Pro (1988, 1990, 1991, and 1996); a two-time Triple Crown winner (1983 and 1985); and a four-time competitor in the Quiksilver in Memory of Eddie Aikau big-wave event at Waimea (finishing fourth in 1990).

In one of pro surfing's most remarkable competitive achievements, the 40-year-old Ho finished runner-up in the 1997 Pipeline Masters. A mainstay in the World Masters Championships, an annual event for ex-pros over the age of 36, Ho won the event in 2000, and made the quarterfinals of the 2011 event in Brazil. In 2012, Ho was inducted to the Surfing Walk of Fame at Huntington Beach.
