= Derek Ho =

American surfer (1964–2020)

Personal information
- Born: September 26, 1964 Kailua, Hawaii, U.S.
- Died: July 17, 2020 (aged 55) Hawaii, U.S.
- Years active: 1986–2020
- Height: 5 ft 5 in (165 cm)
- Weight: 133 lb (60 kg)

Surfing career
- Sport: Surfing
- Sponsors: Volcom
- Major achievements: 1993 World Champion; Vans Triple Crown; 1986/1988/1990/1992

Surfing specifications
- Stance: Goofy foot

Derek Ho (September 26, 1964 – July 17, 2020) was a Hawaiian Chinese surfer who won the world surfing championship in 1993. Ho was born in Kailua, Honolulu County, Hawaii. He began surfing at the age of three, and won the world title at age 29, making him the first Native Hawaiian world champion. Derek Ho was the brother of Michael Ho, another champion surfer, and the first cousin of Don Ho, the Hawaiian singer. He was the uncle of professional surfers Mason Ho and Coco Ho.

On July 17, 2020, Ho was hospitalized after suffering a heart attack; he subsequently fell into a coma and died late that afternoon.

== See also ==
- ASP World Tour

Achievements
Preceded by Kelly Slater	Association of Surfing Professionals World Champion (men's); 1993	Succeeded by Kelly Slater
