= Margaret River Pro 2015 =

The Margaret River Pro 2015 was an event of the Association of Surfing Professionals for 2015 ASP World Tour.

This event was held from 15 to 26 April at Margaret River, (Western Australia, Australia) and contested by 36 surfers.

The tournament was won by Adriano De Souza (BRA), who beat John John Florence (HAW) in final.

== Round 1 ==
Heat 1
1	John Florence	(Hawaii)	13.00
2	Wiggolly Dantas	(Brazil)	4.46
3	Dusty Payne	(Hawaii)	2.60

Heat 2
1	Jordy Smith	(South Africa)	7.43
2	Jadson Andre	(Brazil)	3.40
3	Brett Simpson	(United States)	0.50

Heat 3
1	Kelly Slater	(United States)	8.20
2	Kai Otton	(Australia)	3.33
3	Ricardo Christie	(New Zealand)	3.27

Heat 4
1	Sebastian Zietz	(Hawaii)	15.23
2	A. de Souza	(Brazil)	13.50
3	C. J. Hobgood	(United States)	4.40

Heat 5
1	F. Patacchia	(Hawaii)	4.30
2	Gabriel Medina	(Brazil)	3.96
3	Alejo Muniz	(Brazil)	3.27

Heat 6
1	Mick Fanning	(Australia)	14.00
2	Jay Davies	(Australia)	10.27
3	Matt Wilkinson	(Australia)	3.34

Heat 7
1	Adrian Buchan	(Australia)	13.74
2	Josh Kerr	(Australia)	8.73
3	Keanu Asing	(Hawaii)	3.33

Heat 8
1	Miguel Pupo	(Brazil)	12.43
2	Glenn Hall	(Republic of Ireland)	10.50
3	Filipe Toledo	(Brazil)	8.36

Heat 9
1	Jérémy Florès	(France)	15.00
2	Taj Burrow	(Australia)	11.53
3	Bede Durbidge	(Australia)	8.33

Heat 10
1	Joel Parkinson	(Australia)	15.73
2	Adan Melling	(Australia)	8.24
3	Kolohe Andino	(United States)	5.00

Heat 11
1	Michel Bourez	(French Polynesia)	14.76
2	Nat Young	(United States)	14.70
3	Italo Ferreira	(Brazil)	9.93

Heat 12
1	Julian Wilson	(Australia)	14.60
2	Matt Banting	(Australia)	8.30
3	Owen Wright	(Australia)	6.80

== Round 2 ==
Heat 1: 1 / Jay Davies / (Australia) / 15.17; 2 / Gabriel Medina / (Brazil) / 7.67	Heat 2: 1 / A. de Souza / (Brazil) / 13.90; 2 / Alejo Muniz / (Brazil) / 11.33	Heat 3: 1 / Josh Kerr / (Australia) / 9.33; 2 / C. J. Hobgood / (United States) / 4.83	Heat 4: 1 / Ricardo Christie / (New Zealand) / 13.26; 2 / Filipe Toledo / (Brazil) / 13.07

Heat 5: 1 / Taj Burrow / (Australia) / 13.67; 2 / Brett Simpson / (United States) / 7.17	Heat 6: 1 / Owen Wright / (Australia) / 18.50; 2 / Dusty Payne / (Hawaii) / 10.90	Heat 7: 1 / Nat Young / (United States) / 11.50; 2 / Keanu Asing / (Hawaii) / 2.43	Heat 8: 1 / Glenn Hall / (Republic of Ireland) / 5.44; 2 / Kolohe Andino / (United States) / 4.90

Heat 9: 1 / Adan Melling / (Australia) / 7.53; 2 / Bede Durbidge / (Australia) / 5.47	Heat 10: 1 / Italo Ferreira / (Brazil) / 12.26; 2 / Wiggolly Dantas / (Brazil) / 11.66	Heat 11: 1 / Jadson Andre / (Brazil) / 10.83; '2 / Matt Banting / (Australia) / 7.17	Heat 12: 1 / Kai Otton / (Australia) / 16.83; 1 / Matt Wilkinson / (Australia) / 13.07

== Round 3 ==
Heat 1: 1 / Jérémy Florès / (France); 2 / Jordy Smith / (South Africa) / INJ	Heat 2: 1 / Michel Bourez / (French Polynesia) / 15.23; 2 / Kai Otton / (Australia) / 10.94	Heat 3: 1 / John Florence / (Hawaii) / 15.20; 2 / Adan Melling / (Australia) / 6.10	Heat 4: 1 / Sebastian Zietz / (Hawaii) / 14.30; 2 / Joel Parkinson / (Australia) / 7.50

Heat 5: 1 / Nat Young / (United States) / 13.50; 2 / Miguel Pupo / (Brazil) / 12.37	Heat 6: 1 / Jay Davies / (Australia) / 16.83; 2 / Mick Fanning / (Australia) / 13.90	Heat 7: 1 / A. de Souza / (Brazil) / 9.60; 2 / Ricardo Christie / (New Zealand) / 4.37	Heat 8: 1 / Julian Wilson / (Australia) / 7.50; 2 / Adrian Buchan / (Australia) / 6.77

Heat 9: 1 / Taj Burrow / (Australia) / 15.16; 2 / F. Patacchia / (Hawaii) / 15.04	Heat 10: 1 / Josh Kerr / (Australia) / 14.50; 2 / Italo Ferreira / (Brazil) / 13.66	Heat 11: 1 / Owen Wright / (Australia) / 16.33; 2 / Jadson Andre / (Brazil) / 12.50	Heat 12: 1 / Kelly Slater / (United States) / 19.50; 2 / Glenn Hall / (Republic of Ireland) / 11.03

== Round 4 ==
Heat 1
1	John Florence	(Hawaii)	14.60
2	Jérémy Florès	(France)	13.73
3	Michel Bourez	(French Polynesia)	6.77

Heat 2
1	Nat Young	(United States)	16.93
2	Sebastian Zietz	(Hawaii)	7.90
3	Jay Davies	(Australia)	7.83

Heat 3
1	Taj Burrow	(Australia)	16.17
2	Julian Wilson	(Australia)	12.43
3	A. de Souza	(Brazil)	12.30

Heat 4
1	Kelly Slater	(United States)	13.17
2	Josh Kerr	(Australia)	7.10
3	Owen Wright	(Australia)	4.50

== Round 5 ==
Heat 1: 1 / Jay Davies / (Australia) / 17.10; 2 / Jérémy Florès / (France) / 16.00	Heat 2: 1 / Michel Bourez / (French Polynesia) / 14.70; 2 / Sebastian Zietz / (Hawaii) / 11.50	Heat 3: 1 / Julian Wilson / (Australia) / 19.06; 2 / Owen Wright / (Australia) / 13.00	Heat 4: 1 / A. de Souza / (Brazil) / 14.83; 2 / Josh Kerr / (Australia) / 10.66

== Quarter finals ==
Heat 1: 1 / John Florence / (Hawaii) / 17.87; 2 / Jay Davies / (Australia) / 13.84	Heat 2: 1 / Nat Young / (United States) / 14.60; 2 / Michel Bourez / (French Polynesia) / 11.23	Heat 3: 1 / Taj Burrow / (Australia) / 16.27; 2 / Julian Wilson / (Australia) / 13.67	Heat 4: 1 / A. de Souza / (Brazil) / 15.73; 2 / Kelly Slater / (United States) / 9.96

== Semi finals ==
Heat 1: 1 / John Florence / (Hawaii) / 16.87; 2 / Nat Young / (United States) / 12.90	Heat 2: 1 / A. de Souza / (Brazil) / 13.66; 2 / Taj Burrow / (Australia) / 13.27

== Final ==
Heat 1
1	A. de Souza	(Brazil)	17.53
2	John Florence	(Hawaii)	16.87
