= Silvana Lima =

Brazilian surfer (born 1984)

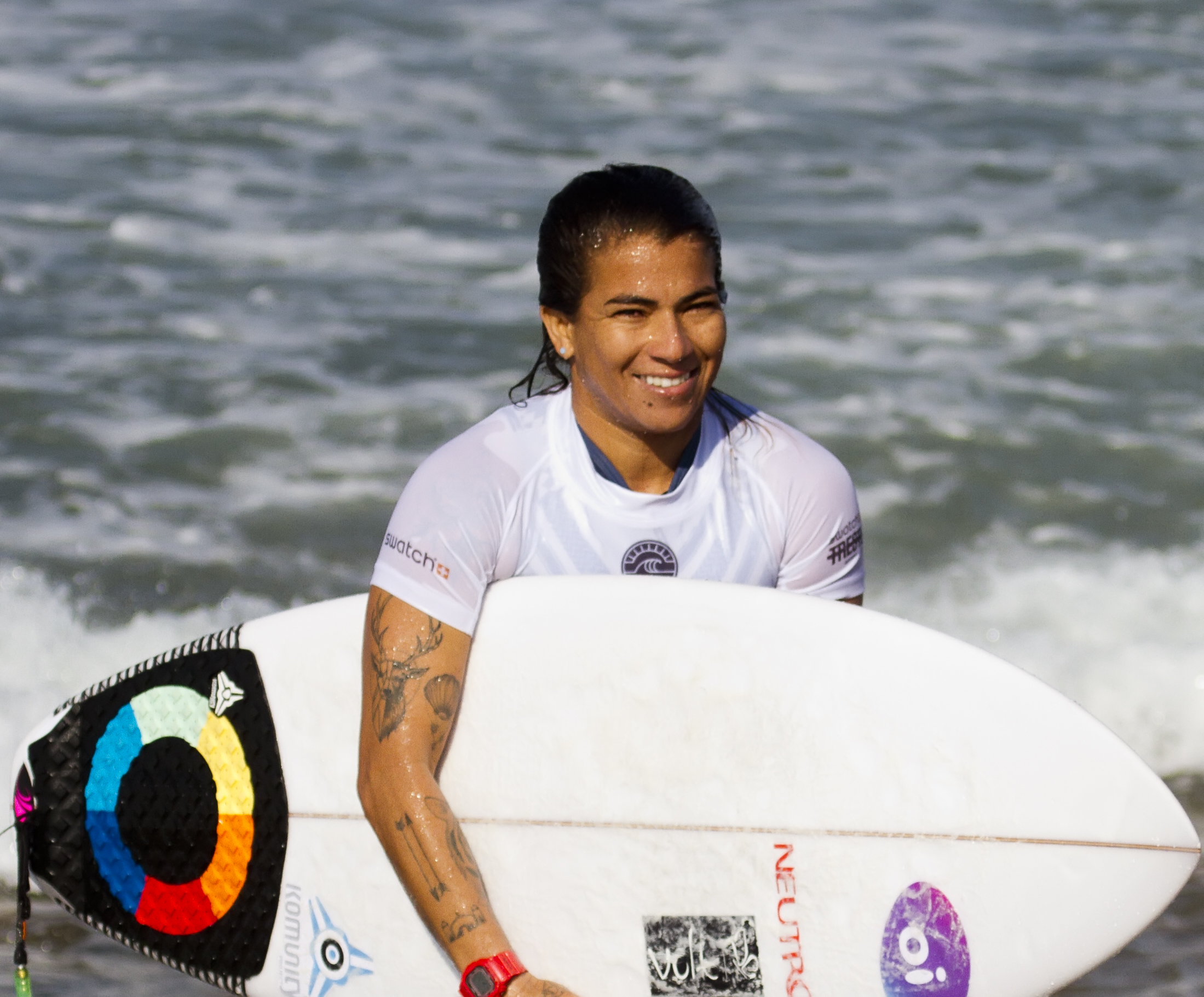
- Silvana Lima after winning her heat at the Swatch Pro 2017.

Personal information
- Born: 29 October 1984 (age 41) Paracuru, Ceará, Brazil

Surfing career
- Sport: Surfing
- Best year: Vice World Champion – 2008, 2009

Surfing specifications
- Stance: Regual (natural foot)
Medal record
Women's surfing
Representing Brazil
World Games
Gold medal – first place	2019 Miyazaki	Team
Bronze medal – third place	2023 La Bocana	Team

Silvana Lima (born 29 October 1984) is a Brazilian professional surfer. She was born in Paracuru, Ceará, Brazil on 29 October 1984 and grew up in a snack-shack on the sand, owned by her parents. When she was seven years old, she fashioned a makeshift fin to a piece of wood and taught herself to surf. She got her first real surfboard at age 14.

Despite competing in the top tier of women's surfing for eight years, Lima was unable to secure sponsorship. She spoke publicly about the challenge, attributing it to surf wear brands only wanting to sponsor surfers who look like models, regardless of their talents. In order to fund her travels, she began breeding French bulldogs.

In the ASP World Tour, she placed 9th in 2006, 3rd in 2007, runner-up in 2008 and 2009, 4th in 2010 and 5th in 2011.

She represented Brazil at the 2020 Summer Olympics. She is openly lesbian.

== Career ==
Event Wins

WCT Wins
Year	Event	Venue	Country
2017	Swatch Women's Pro Trestles	Trestles	United States
2010	Movistar Peru Classic	San Bartolo District	Peru
2009	Beachley Classic	Sydney	Australia
2009	Rip Curl Pro	Bells Beach	Australia
WQS Wins
Year	Event	Venue	Country
2017	Los Cabos Open of Surf	San José del Cabo	Mexico
2014	Pantin Classic Galicia Pro	A Coruña	Spain
2014	Port Taranaki Pro NZ Home Loans Surf Festival	New Plymouth	New Zealand
2008	Billabong Ladies Pro Costao do Santinho	Florianópolis	Brazil
2008	The Mr Price Pro	KwaZulu-Natal	South Africa
2008	Billabong ECO Surf Festival	Bahia	Brazil

=== WSL World Championship Tour ===
Tournament	2008	2009	2010	2011	2012	2013	2014	2015	2016	2017
Roxy Pro Gold Coast	9th	1st	5th	5th	5th	9th	-	5th	-	13th
Rip Curl Pro	9th	9th	5th	3rd	INJ	5th	-	9th	-	9th
Margaret River Pro	-	-	-	-	-	13th	-	9th	-	13th
Rio Pro	5th	-	-	3rd	INJ	13th	9th	9th	13th	13th
Fiji Women's Pro	-	-	-	-	-	-	-	13th	-	13th
US Open of Surfing	-	-	-	9th	INJ	9th	-	9th	-	9th
Swatch Women's Pro Trestles	-	-	-	-	-	-	-	13th	-	1st
Pro Portugal	-	-	5th	-	-	9th	-	13th	-	9th
Roxy Pro France	-	-	-	5th	INJ	13th	-	13th	-	9th
Maui Women's Pro	-	3rd	-	-	-	-	-	13th	-	5th
TSB Bank NZ Surf Festival	-	-	5th	9th	INJ	13th	-	-	-	-
Beachley Classic	2nd	1st	3rd	5th	INJ	-	-	-	-	-
Movistar Classic Peru	2nd	5th	1st	-	-	-	-	-	-	-
Rip Curl Search	-	3rd	5th	-	-	-	-	-	-	-
O'Neill Women's World Cup	-	-	5th	-	-	-	-	-	-	-
World Cup Sunset Beach	-	9th	-	-	-	-	-	-	-	-
Rip Curl Pro Mademoiselle	3rd	-	-	-	-	-	-	-	-	-
Rank	-	-	-	5º	16º	15º	-	14º	21º	12º
Earnings	-	-	-	$43,000	$6,000	$43,000	-	$99,250	$9,000	$123,000
