= Mason Ho =

American surfer

Mason Ho (born September 1, 1988) is a professional surfer from Sunset Beach on Oahu's North Shore. A member of the Ho surfing dynasty, Mason is the son of professional surfer Michael Ho, brother of Coco Ho, and nephew to World Champion surfer Derek Ho. His father is the second cousin to the famous singer Don Ho. Mason has been sponsored by Rip Curl and Lost surfboards, and is known for his easy-going attitude in interviews. Mason has been frequently dubbed "The World's Most Entertaining Surfer". Mason has won the HIC pro on two occasions and won two surfer poll awards in 2016 - one of which was for the self-produced documentary "License to Chill."
