= Dane Reynolds =

American surfer (born 1985)

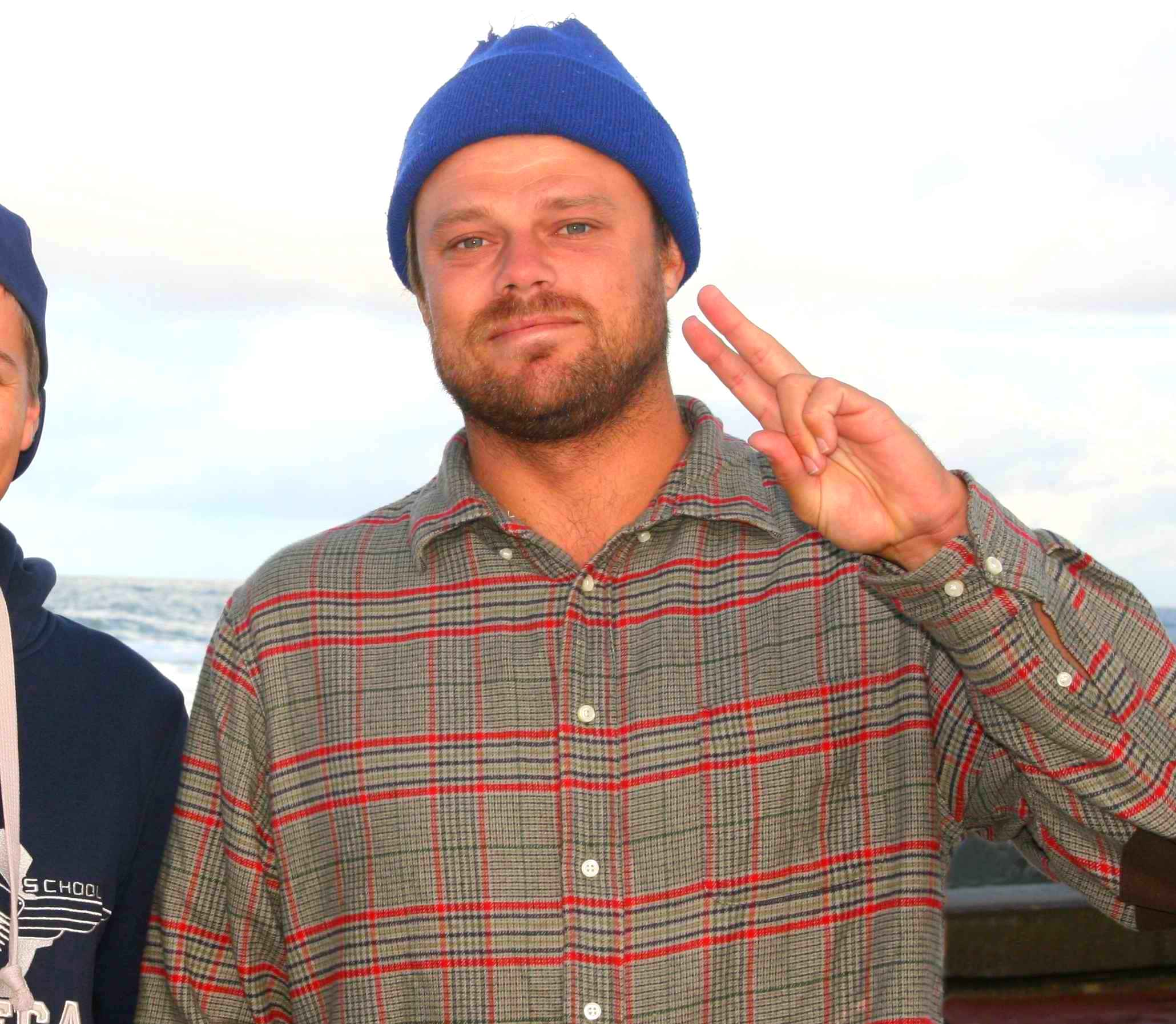

Personal information
- Born: September 7, 1985 (age 41) Long Beach, California, U.S.
- Years active: 2008-present
- Height: 6 ft 0 in (183 cm)
- Weight: 190 lb (86 kg)
- Website: Marine Layer Productions (his blog)

Surfing career
- Sport: Surfing
- Best year: 4th - 2010 ASP World Tour
- Career earnings: $357,325
- Sponsors: Vans, Homegrown Surf Shop, Channel Islands, and Drag Board Co

Surfing specifications
- Stance: Regular (natural foot)

Dane Reynolds (born September 7, 1985 in Long Beach, California) is an American professional surfer from Ventura, California. He is known for his "go for broke" style of surfing that includes many experimental and aerial maneuvers.

== Biography ==
Reynolds started surfing at the age of 10 after he moved from Bakersfield, California to Ventura. It was here on the point breaks around Santa Barbara and Ventura that he honed his progressive style of surfing. Reynolds first started competing at age 13 and at 16 had dropped out of school to surf.

Reynolds competed in the 2003 and 2004 X-Games and received the highest single wave score both years. The 2008 ASP World Tour marked his rookie year on the esteemed tour after finishing 2nd on the ASP World Qualifying Series (WQS) behind Jordy Smith. His ranking on the WCT in 2008 was 19th with 4066 points, then he moved up to the coveted "Top Ten" (10th) in 2009 with 5219 points. In 2010 Reynolds had a breakout year, ending up tied for fourth in the 2010 ASP World Tour with Taj Burrow. His 2011 tour started disappointly missing the first three events due to a knee injury.

Reynold's first video, "First Chapter", won Best Male Performance in a Video and Video of the Year at the 2006 Surfer Poll Awards.

Major sponsors of Dane Reynolds include Channel Islands,

Dane Reynolds started Summer Teeth with his manager Blair Marlin. It was started as a kitschy beach gear brand, they now produce t-shirts and other apparel.

In August 2012, Reynolds was inducted into the Surfers' Hall of Fame in Huntington Beach, California.

In late 2011 Dane distinguished himself from other pro surfers by shaping his own surfboard called the Channel Islands Sperm Whale. Rob Machado and others have created their own surfboards as well, instead of relying on a surfboard shaper.

In November 2015, Reynolds parted ways with his long time clothing sponsor, Quiksilver.

In February 2017, Dane Reynolds launched a new clothing company called Former. The company was originally founded by Reynolds, professional surfer Craig Anderson, and professional skateboarders Dylan Rieder and Austyn Gillette. Former is "independently owned and operated, with the intention of creating, designing, and producing what we like to wear and be a part of." Former put out a promotional video of Reynolds called Premium Violence in conjunction with the release of the company's second collection of apparel in September 2017.

== Films ==
- Damage inc.
- Yield
- First Chapter
- Young Guns
- Young Guns 2
- Young Guns 3
- Campaign
- Campaign 2
- Dude Cruise
- Stranger Than Fiction
- Days of the Strange
- The Present
- The Collection
- Modern Collective
- Castles in the Sky
- The Union Express
- Thrills Spills And What Not
- Seen Unseen
- Lost Atlas
- Dear Suburbia
- Slow Dance (Director/Producer)
- Sampler
- Loaded
- Cluster
- Lost Interest
- Chapter 11
- Premium Violence
