= Namotu =

Coordinates: 17.8442088°S 177.1808964°E

- Interactive map of Namotu

Geography
- Location: South Pacific
- Archipelago: Mamanuca Islands

Administration
- Fiji
- Division: Western
- Province: Nadroga-Navosa Province
- District: Malolo

Demographics
- Population: unknown

Additional information
- Official website: Official

Namotu Island is one of the few hundreds of islands that make up the country of Fiji. It is in the southernmost part of the chain of islands called the Mamanuca Islands, which are just west of Nadi.

Namotu is located south of Malolo Lailai and northwest of Tavarua and just off the western coast of the main island of Fiji known as Viti Levu. Namotu Island Resort, a haven for tourists, lies about five nautical miles west of Viti Levu. It is owned by Fiji Traditional Owners; including the villages of Yako, Momi and Nabila. The resort on Namotu is a privately operated company.

== History ==
In July 1840 the Wilkes Expedition named this island after Richard Russell Waldron, purser, USS Vincennes.

== Sources ==
- Brown, W. G. (1993). Diving and Snorkeling Guide to Fiji. Houston, Tex.: Pisces Books.
- Surfline/Wavetrak, Inc. (n.d.) About Wilkes Pass, Namotu. Surfline. Retrieved (4/20/13) http://www.surfline.com/surf-report/wilkes-pass-namotu-fiji_7285/travel/
- Subsurface Fiji. (2012) Game Fishing. Subsurface Fiji. Retrieved (4/20/13) https://web.archive.org/web/20130826191715/http://fijidiving.com/?cat=14
- Waterways Surf Adventures. (n.d.) Activities – Surfing. Namotu Island Fiji. Retrieved (4/20/13) https://web.archive.org/web/20131118210705/http://www.namotuislandfiji.com/surfing-with-map
