= Johanne Defay =

French professional surfer (born 1993)

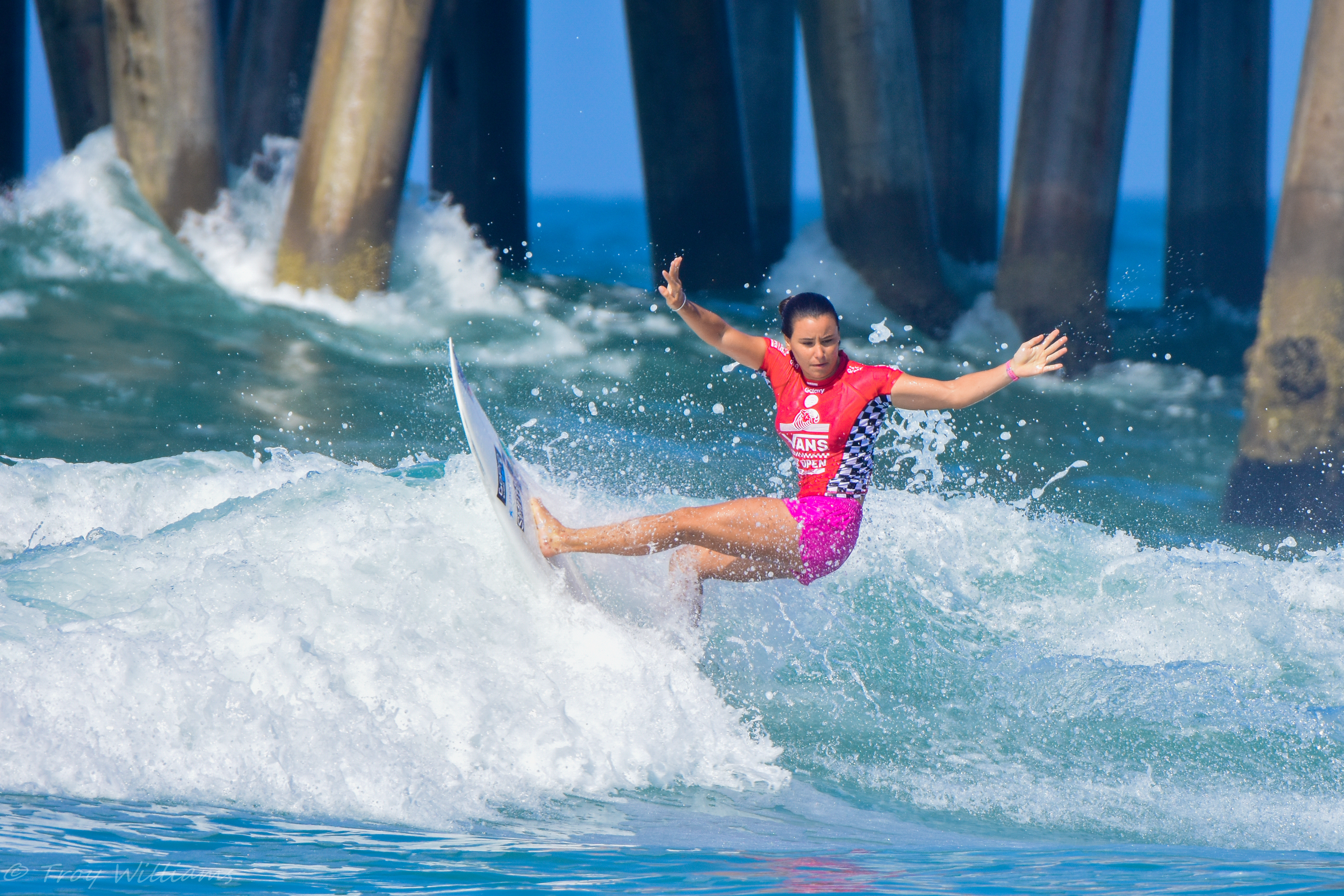
- Johanne Defay at the 2016 US Open of Surfing

Personal information
- Born: 19 November 1993 (age 32) Le Puy-en-Velay, France
- Height: 5 ft 5 in (165 cm)
- Weight: 134 lb (61 kg)

Surfing career
- Sport: Surfing
- Best year: Ranked #3 WSL CT World Tour – 2022
- Sponsors: Wakanda, GoPro Cameras, Smith Optics, Superdry Surf Company, Smoothstar Skateboards, Tim Spirit, Seventyone Percent Skincare
- Major achievements: 2024 Olympics bronze Medal; WSL Championship Tour event wins: 6; 2014 WSL Rookie of the Year; 1x US Open of Surfing champion (2015)

Surfing specifications
- Stance: Natural (regular) foot
- Shaper: Channel Islands
Medal record
Women's surfing
Representing France
Olympic Games
Bronze medal – third place	2024 Paris	Shortboard
World Games
Gold medal – first place	2017 Biarritz	Team
Silver medal – second place	2017 Biarritz	Women
Silver medal – second place	2023 La Bocana	Team
Silver medal – second place	2024 Arecibo	Team
Bronze medal – third place	2023 La Bocana	Women
Bronze medal – third place	2024 Arecibo	Women

Johanne Defay (born 19 November 1993) is a French professional surfer. She was born in Le Puy-en-Velay in the Auvergne region of France. She qualified for the 2024 Olympic Games where she won bronze.

She began surfing at the age of 8 off the beaches of Reunion Island, which is her home today. After Johanne's first competition when she was only ten years old, she quickly moved through the European amateur ranks to eventually take on the WSL World Qualifying Series. In 2008 Defay almost gave up competing. She was finding it difficult to transition from the juniors to the WQS and then the economy crashed causing many surf companies cancel their sponsorships. At that time, Johanne found herself without sponsors and also without decent results. However, with her parents’ encouragement, Johanne was able to qualify for the World Championship Tour within two years.

She has won five World Surf League events, the Vans US Open of Surfing 2015, the Fiji Women's Pro 2016, Uluwatu CT 2018, the Jeep Surf Ranch Pro 2021 and the Quiksilver/ROXY Pro G-Land 2022.

== Competitive highlights ==
- 2024 Bronze Medal Olympics - Paris (Tahiti)
- 2016 WSL 2016 Rank: 5
- 2016 1st Fiji Women's Pro – Fiji
- 2016 3rd Roxy Pro Gold Coast – Australia
- 2015 8th World Championship Tour
- 2015 3rd Fiji Women's Pro – Fiji
- 2015 5th Rip Curl Pro Bell's Beach – Australia
- 2015 1st Vans US Open of Surfing – California
- 2015 5th Cascais Women's Pro – Portugal
- 2015 5th Roxy Pro – France
- 2014 ROOKIE OF THE YEAR – 8th on Final Ranking
- 2014 3rd Swatch Women's Pro – California
- 2014 3rd Roxy Pro – France
- 2014 5th Fiji Women's Pro – Fiji
- 2014 5th Vans US Open of Surfing – California
- 2014 5th Cascais Women's Pro – Portugal
- 2014 5th Target Maui Pro – Hawaii
- 2013 3rd Junior World Championship Florianopolis – Brazil
- 2013 1st France Champion Brétignolles sur Mer – France
- 2013 1st Pontevedra Junior Pro Surf – Spain
- 2013 Open European Champion
- 2013 Junior European Champion
- 2013 Finalist of the 6 stars WQS Swatch Girls Pro – France
- 2013 1st Swatch Girls Junior Pro – France
- 2013 1st Soöruz Junior Pro – France
- 2013 1st Gijòn Junior Pro – Spain
- 2013 2nd O’Neil Junior Pro – Spain
- 2013 1st Soöruz Junior Pro – France
- 2013 4th Coupe de France – France

== Career victories ==
WCT Wins
Year	Event	Venue	Country
2024	MEO Rip Curl Pro Portugal	Supertubos, Peniche	Portugal
2022	Quiksilver/ROXY Pro G-Land	G-Land, Banyuwangi	Indonesia
2021	Jeep Surf Ranch Pro	Lemoore, California	United States
2018	Uluwatu CT - Women's	Uluwatu, Bali	Indonesia
2016	Fiji Women's Pro	Namotu, Tavarua	Fiji
2015	Women's Vans US Open of Surfing	Huntington Beach, California	United States

=== WSL World Championship Tour ===
Tournament	2014	2015	2016	2017	2018	2019	2020
Roxy Pro Gold Coast	13th	13th	3rd	3rd	9th	5th	Cancel due to COVID-19 crisis
Drug Aware Margaret River Pro	9th	9th	13th	9th	Canceled and finished at Uluwatu	9th	Cancel due to COVID-19 crisis
Rip Curl Women's Pro Bells Beach	13th	5th	5th	5th	5th	9th	Cancel due to COVID-19 crisis
Rio Women's Pro	13th	9th	5th	2nd	9th	9th	Cancel due to COVID-19 crisis
Corona Bali Protected	-	-	-	-	13th	9th	Cancel due to COVID-19 crisis
Uluwatu CT	-	-	-	-	1st	-	Cancel due to COVID-19 crisis
Fiji Women's Pro	5th	3rd	1st	5th	-	-	Cancel due to COVID-19 crisis
Corona open J-Bay	-	-	-	-	5th	5th	Cancel due to COVID-19 crisis
Vans US Open of Surfing	5th	1st	13th	5th	5th	-	Cancel due to COVID-19 crisis
Swatch Women's Pro Trestles	3rd	9th	5th	9th	-	-	Cancel due to COVID-19 crisis
Surf Ranch Pro	-	-	-	-	5th	2nd	Cancel due to COVID-19 crisis
Roxy Pro France	3rd	5th	9th	9th	5th	3rd	Cancel due to COVID-19 crisis
Cascais Women's Pro	5th	5th	3rd	13th	-	-	Cancel due to COVID-19 crisis
MEO Rip Curl Pro Portugal	-	-	-	-	-	5th	Cancel due to COVID-19 crisis
Maui Pro	5th	9th	13th	13th	5th	5th	Cancel due to COVID-19 crisis
Rank	8th	8th	5th	9th	5th	8th	Cancel due to COVID-19 crisis
