= Lakey Peterson =

American surfer (born 1994)

- Born: Laura Louise Peterson; September 30, 1994 (age 31); Santa Barbara, California
- Spouse: Thomas Allen
- Surfing career
- Height: 5 ft 6 in (1.68 m)
- Weight: 130 lb (59 kg)
- Sport: Surfing
- Best year: 2018 - Ranked #2 WSL CT World Tour
- Sponsors: Nike 6.0, and Hurley, Channel Islands surf boards, Sisstrevolution
- Major achievements: WSL Championship Tour event wins: 6; 1x US Open of Surfing champion (2012)

Surfing specifications
- Stance: Regular
- Shaper: Channel Islands – Al Merrick

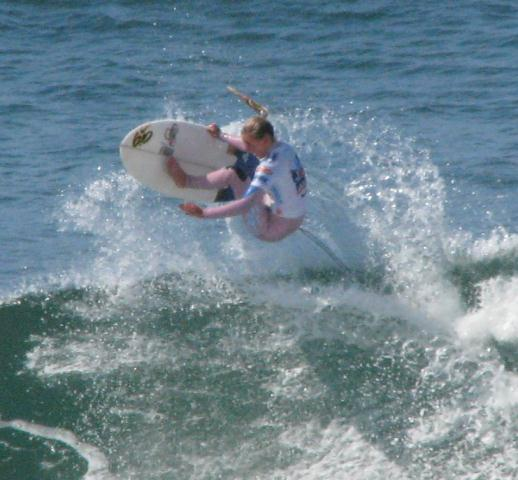
Peterson at 2011 U.S. Open of Surfing

Laura Louise "Lakey" Peterson (born September 30, 1994) is an American professional surfer. She has been ranked as high as No. 1 by the World Surf League, the highest professional level of women's surfing, and #6 on the ASP Women's World Ranking. In 2009, Peterson landed the first-ever aerial in NSSA women's competition history and won the title.

== Early life ==
In 2000, when Peterson was just five years old, her parents, David and Sue, rounded up their youngest child and her two older siblings—Whitney, then 13, and Parker, 10—and set out on a year-long, around-the-world adventure. It was during this trip that Peterson learned to surf. For three months, the Petersons set up shop in Manly Beach, Australia, where their littlest member instantly earned the nickname "Lakey Legend" from the locals for effortlessly catching wave after wave on her boogie board. However, once returning home to the US, Peterson did not continue surfing. Resuming at the age of 12, she qualified for the Association of Surfing Professionals (ASP) Women's World Championship Tour by 16, and began her rookie year on tour in the 2012 season a year later.

== Career ==
=== 2018 World Championship Tour ===
For the 2018 World Surf League Championship Tour Peterson ranked second overall behind Australian surfer Stephanie Gilmore. Peterson was the highest ranked female American surfer for the year's world championship tour.

=== 2019 World Championship Tour ===
In the 2019 World Surf league Championship Tour, Peterson ranked third overall behind the Carissa Moore and Caroline Marks.

=== 2020 Summer Olympics ===
Peterson finished third out of female competitors for the United States at the qualifying event for the 2020 Summer Olympics, the 2019 World Surf League Championship Tour, and only the top two finishers for the country qualified directly for the US Olympic Team. Her third place overall finish behind two female American surfers qualified her indirectly for the US Olympic Surf Team as an alternate.

=== Highlights ===
A few of Peterson's career highlights thus far include:

Surf Career Highlights
Year	Placed	Score	Event	Ref
2023	1st		Corona Open J-Bay	
2019	3rd	55,125	2019 World Surf League Championship Tour	
2019	1st		Drug Aware Pro Margaret River - Australia	
2018	2nd	54,260	2018 World Surf League Championship Tour	
2018	1st		Roxy Pro Gold Coast - Australia	
2018	2nd		Oi Rio Women's Pro - Brazil	
2018	1st		Corona Bali Protected - Bali	
2018	2nd		Corona Open J Bay - Africa	
2017	6th	44,100	2017 World Surf League Championship Tour	
2017	2nd		Roxy Pro Gold Coast - Australia	
2017	2nd		Roxy Pro - France	
2016	16th	21,850	2016 World Surf League Championship Tour	
2015	6th	47,000	2015 World Surf League Championship Tour	
2015	3rd		Trestles Women Pro – California	
2015	2nd		Cascais Women's Pro – Portugal	
2015	9th		Women's Maui Pro – Hawaii	
2014	6th	42,300	2014 World Surf League Championship Tour	
2013	7th	35,400	2013 World Surf League Championship Tour	
2012	1st		US Open Surfing - California	

=== Career victories ===
WCT Wins
Year	Event	Venue	Country
2026	Margaret River Pro	Margaret River, Western Australia	Australia
2023	Corona Open J-Bay	Jeffreys Bay, Eastern Cap	South Africa
2019	Freshwater Pro	Lemoore, California	United States
2019	Margaret River Pro	Margaret River, Western Australia	Australia
2018	Corona Bali Protected	Keramas Beach, Bali	Indonesia
2018	Roxy Pro Gold Coast	Gold Coast, Queensland	Australia

==== Sponsors ====
Peterson currently is sponsored by sisstrevolution, Blenders Eyewear Channel Islands, and Homegrown Surf Shop. She is featured in a Toyota Tacoma commercial.

In March 2020, Peterson became one of six women athletes to feature on the limited edition packaging of Clif Bars available throughout 2020.

== Personal life ==
Peterson dated Australian surfer Thomas Allen for a number of years before becoming engaged on January 21, 2018, near Peterson's hometown in California, with close friends and fellow surfers nearby. They were married on February 2, 2019.

On February 14, 2010, Peterson started her YouTube channel dedicated to sharing her life, travel, and surfing. She began uploading videos in May 2019 with a first video in vlog format covering life in Bali surrounding a surfing competition. In addition to publishing her own content on YouTube, Peterson is a fan of the videos Hailey Baldwin shares on YouTube.

In 2019, Peterson posed nude for ESPN’s The Body Issue magazine.

== Filmography ==
Year	Title	Portrayal	Ref
2011	Leave A Message	Herself	
2013	Lakey Peterson: Zero to 100	Herself	
