= Courtney Conlogue =

American professional surfer

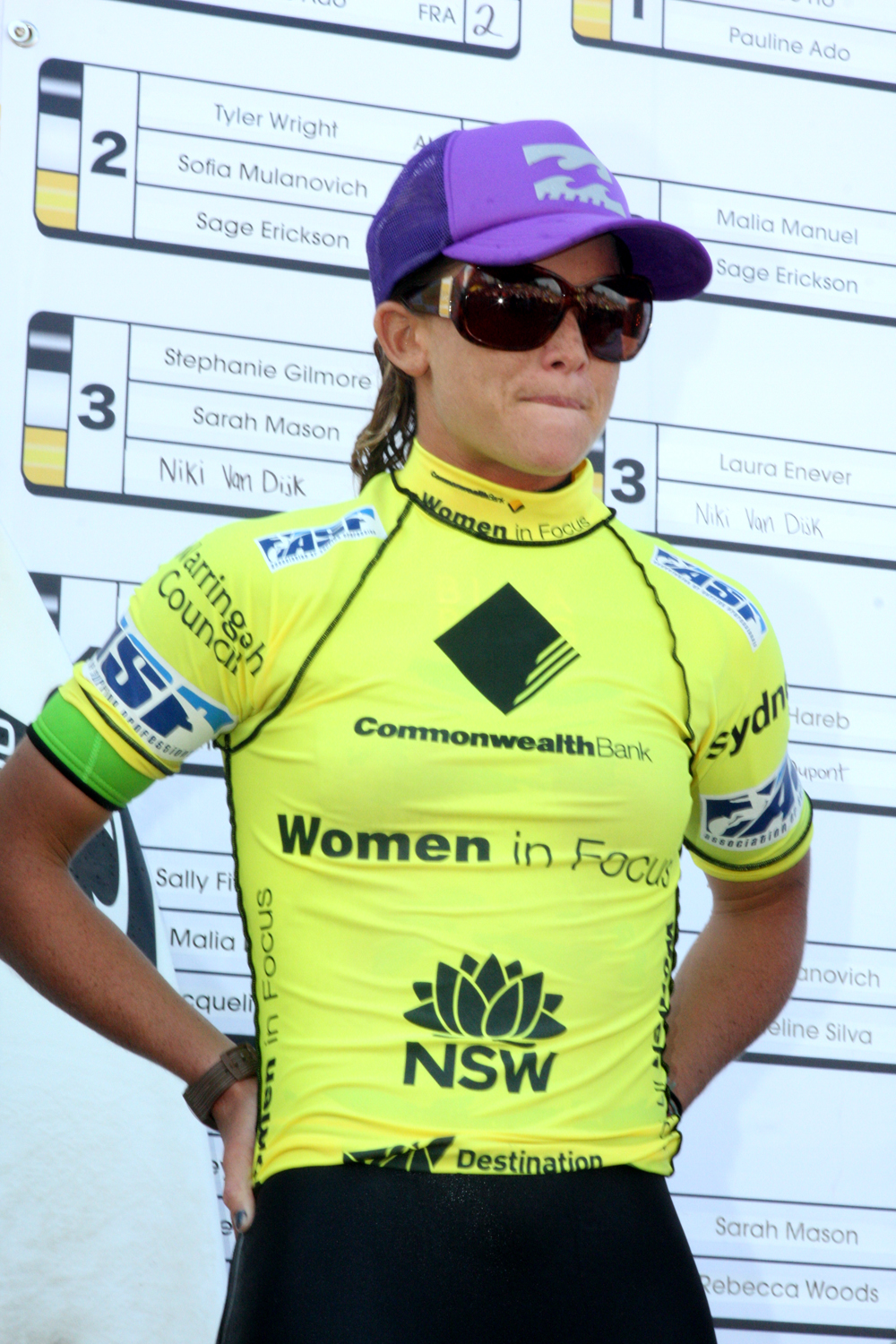

Personal information
- Nickname: Sea Tiger
- Born: August 25, 1992 (age 33) Santa Ana, California, U.S.
- Height: 5 ft 8 in (1.73 m)
- Weight: 139 lb (63 kg)

Surfing career
- Sport: Surfing
- Best year: Ranked No. 2 WSL CT World Tour – 2015, 2016
- Sponsors: Rockstar Energy Drink, JOLYN, Swatch, Verizon Wireless, Kaenon, Dakine, FCS, Toyota of Huntington Beach, Sexwax, Tim Stamps Surfboards
- Major achievements: Rank No. 2 for both 2015 & 2016 WSL Championships; WSL Championship Tour event wins: 13; 2009 ISA World Women's Champion; 2x US Open of Surfing champion (2009, 2018)

Surfing specifications
- Stance: Regular (natural foot)
- Shaper: Tim Stamps
Medal record
Women's surfing
Representing United States
World Games
Silver medal – second place	2019 Miyazaki	Team

Courtney Conlogue (born August 25, 1992) is an American professional surfer. She was born in Santa Ana, California. Courtney learned to surf at the age of 4. In 2004 when she was 11, Conlogue was the youngest athlete to be selected to the USA Junior Surf Team. She went on to achieve 11th place in the 2005 ISA World Junior Surfing Championships. In 2009, at the ISA World Surfing Games in Costa Rica, Courtney won an individual and team Gold Medal as a USA Surfing Team member. By the time she was 14, she had won a surfing gold medal as a member of the U.S.A. Team at the X Games. When she was 16 she won the biggest competition in the US at the Hurley U.S. Open of Surfing, held at her home break in Huntington Beach, California. She won the US Open of Surfing again in 2018.

In 2014 Conlogue suffered a major ankle injury while training before her heat at the Rip Curl Pro Bells Beach in Australia. She had to withdraw from the contest as well as the Rio Pro, Fiji Women's Pro, and the US Open of Surfing. However, later she ranked in No. 2 place for two years in a row for the World Surf League. In the 2019 WSL WCT season; Conlogue suffered 3 consecutive concussions. She had to withdraw from the last event of the season: the Maui Pro. During 2020 the WSL WCT season was cancelled due to Covid. Due to the severity of Courtney's concussions she underwent a tremendous amount of physical therapy to return to the WSL WCT 2021 season.

She was the winner of the U.S. Open of surfing in 2009 and 2018.

In 2019 she was inducted into the Surfing Walk of Fame as their Woman of the Year.

In 2020 she created her own brand, Sea Tiger, selling paintings, coffee, and clothing. In 2024 she launched her website www.courtneyconlogue.com to display and sell her fine art; originals and prints. Courtney's artwork is on display in several galleries.

== Competitive highlights ==
- 2018 No. 1 Vans US Open of Surfing- Huntington Beach, California
- 2017 Rank No. 4
- 2017 1st Rip Curl Women's Pro – Australia
- 2017 1st Outerknown Fiji Women's Pro – Fiji
- 2017 3rd Vans US Open of Surfing – California
- 2016 Rank No. 2 WSL
- 2016 3rd Maui Women's Pro – Hawaii
- 2016 3rd Roxy Pro – France
- 2016 1st Cascais Women's Pro – Portugal
- 2016 3rd Oi Rio Women's Pro – Brazil
- 2016 2nd Women's Drug Aware Margaret River Pro – Australia
- 2016 1st Rip Curl Women's Pro – Australia
- 2016 2nd Roxy Pro Gold Coast – Australia
- 2015 Ranked 2nd WSL
- 2015 1st Cascais Women's Pro – Portugal
- 2015 3rd Vans US Open of Surfing – California
- 2015 1st Oi Rio Women's Pro – Brazil
- 2015 1st Women's Drug Aware Margaret River Pro – Australia
- 2015 3rd Rip Curl Women's Pro – Australia
- 2014 Ranked 9th WSL
- 2014 3rd Target Maui Pro – Hawaii
- 2014 2nd Roxy Pro – France
- 2013 Ranked 4th WSL
- 2013 2nd Van's US Open – California
- 2013 1st TSB Bank Surf Festival – New Zealand
- 2013 3rd Rip Curl Women's Pro – Australia
- 2012 Ranked 5th WSL
- 2012 1st Commonwealth Bank Beachley Classic – Australia
- 2011 Ranked 8th WSL

== Career victories ==
WCT Wins
Year	Event	Venue	Country
2022	Outerknown Tahiti Pro	Teahupo'o, Tahiti	French Polynesia
2019	Rip Curl Pro Bells Beach	Bells Beach, Victoria	Australia
2018	Roxy Pro France	Soorts-Hossegor, Nouvelle-Aquitaine	France
2018	Vans US Open of Surfing	Huntington Beach, California	United States
2017	Outerknown Fiji Women's Pro	Namotu, Tavarua	Fiji
2017	Rip Curl Women's Pro Bells Beach	Bells Beach, Victoria	Australia
2016	Cascais Women's Pro	Praia de Carcavelos, Cascais	Portugal
2016	Rip Curl Women's Pro Bells Beach	Bells Beach, Victoria	Australia
2015	Cascais Women's Pro	Praia de Carcavelos, Cascais	Portugal
2015	Oi Rio Women's Pro	Rio de Janeiro, Rio de Janeiro	Brazil
2015	Women's Drug Aware Margaret River Pro	Margaret River, Western Australia	Australia
2013	TSB Bank NZ Surf Festival	New Plymouth, Taranaki	New Zealand
2012	Commonwealth Bank Beachley Classic	Sydney	Australia
