= Bianca Buitendag =

South African professional surfer

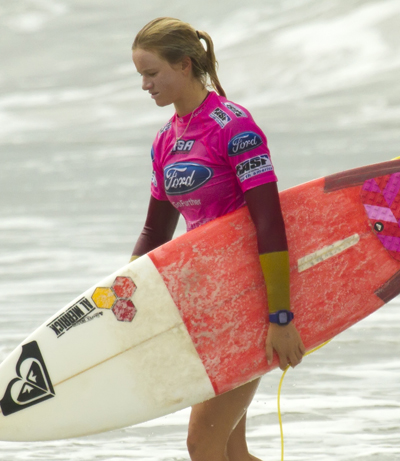
- Buitendag at Super Girl Surf Pro contest in Oceanside, CA 2013.

Personal information
- Born: 9 November 1993 (age 32) Cape Town, Western Cape, South Africa
- Height: 6 ft 1 in (185 cm)
- Weight: 158 lb (72 kg)

Surfing career
- Sport: Surfing
- Best year: 4th – 2015
- Sponsors: Roxy, Channel Islands Surfboards, Moskova Underwear
- Major achievements: 2020 Olympics silver Medal

Surfing specifications
- Stance: Goofy
- Shaper: Channel Islands – Al Merrick
Medal record
Women's surfing
Representing South Africa
Olympic Games
Silver medal – second place	2020 Tokyo	Shortboard

Bianca Buitendag is a South African professional surfer. She has represented South Africa at the 2020 Summer Olympics where she won silver in the women's shortboard competition.

== Early and personal life ==
Buitendag was born in Cape Town, Western Cape, South Africa on 9 November 1993. She grew up near the beach of False Bay outside of Cape Town. With her father's encouragement she learned to surf at the age of eight with her two brothers. When she was twelve her family moved to the Southern Cape region of South Africa. Bianca only spoke Afrikaans when she first went to school, so her parents decided to put her in an English school.

In 2015 her father, Collin Buitendag, died. She was still able to finish at her career-best at World No. 4. The following year she was ranked No 12 in the world.

== Surfing career highlights ==
- 2013 8th ranked WSL
- 2013 3rd Colgate Plax Girl's Rio Pro – Brazil
- 2014 7th ranked WSL
- 2014 3rd Target Women's Maui Pro – Hawaii
- 2014 2nd Roxy Pro Gold Coast – Australia
- 2015 4th ranked WSL
- 2015 2nd Swatch Women's Pro – California
- 2015 3rd Van's US Open of Surfing – California
- 2015 2nd Fiji Women's Pro – Fiji
- 2015 2nd IO Rio Women's Pro – Brazil
- 2016 12th ranked WSL
- 2017 17th ranked WSL
- 2018 3rd Corona J Bay – Africa
- 2019 44th ranked WSL
- 2021 2nd (silver medal) 2020 Summer Olympic Games
