= Coco Ho =

American surfer

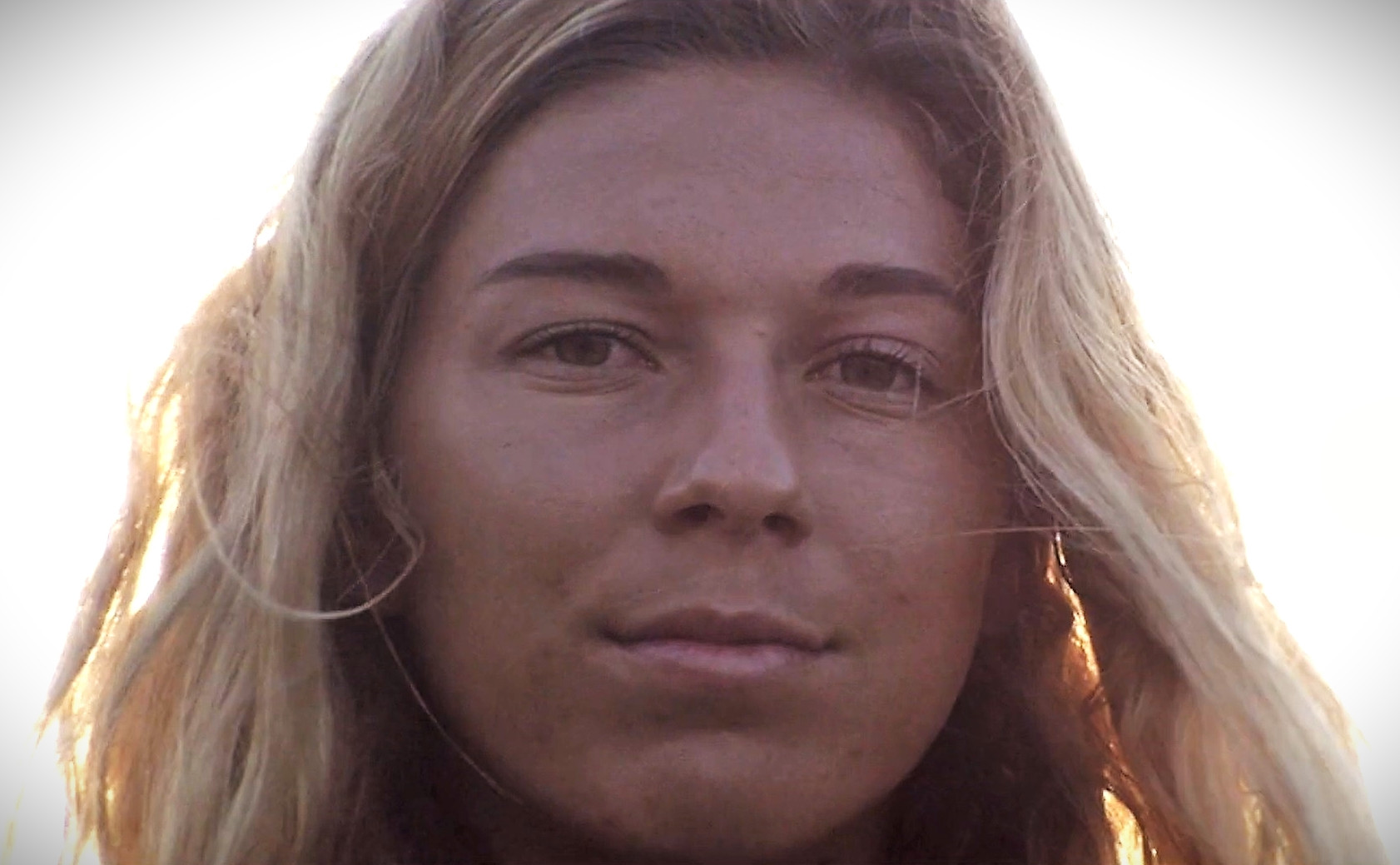
- Ho in trailer for She is the Ocean, 2018 film

Personal information
- Nickname(s): Cokes and Flying Hawaiian
- Born: April 28, 1991 (age 34) Honolulu, Hawaii, United States
- Height: 5 ft 3 in (1.60 m)
- Weight: 122 lb (55 kg)

Surfing career
- Sport: Surfing
- Best year: 2011
- Sponsors: Volcom, Swatch, Beats by Dr. Dre, Etnies, Mayhem
- Major achievements: 2009 WCT Ripcurl Search Portugal Champion: 2009 WSL Rookie of the Year

Surfing specifications
- Stance: Regular (natural foot)
- Shaper: Matt Biolos
- Quiver: 5’6” x 17.75” x 2.05”
- Favorite waves: Snapper and Lowers
- Favorite maneuvers: Anything progressive

Coco Malia Camille Hapaikekoa Ho (born April 28, 1991) is a professional Hawaiian surfer born in Honolulu, Hawaii. She began surfing at 7 years old, following in the footsteps of her family.

== Early years ==
At age 7, Coco Ho began following in the footsteps of her surfer family. Her father, Michael Ho, was formerly a professional surfer (World Cup and 1982 Pipe Masters), as was her uncle, Derek Ho (1993 World Champion). Her brother, Mason Ho (1st Place Cold Water Classic ASP Pro Jr. 2008), played a major role in her early surfing influences. Ho earned her first sponsorship at 8-years-old, and at age 17, she qualified for the ASP Women's World Championship Tour. In 2009, she won the Rookie of the Year award. Raised on Oahu's North Shore, Ho spent most of her time surfing the "Seven Mile Miracle.” She is the face for the Volcom clothing brand.

== Career victories ==
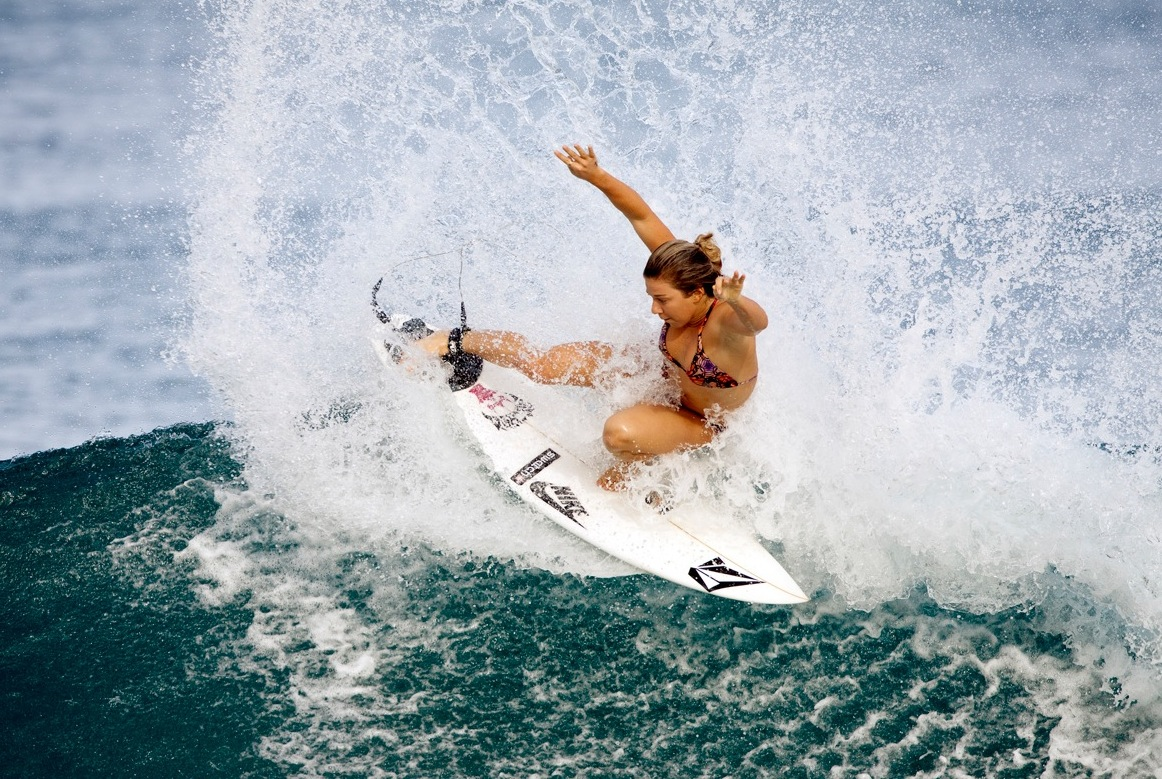
Ho surfing in 2013

- 2005 Open Women's Regional Hawaii Champion
- 2006 Open Regional Hawaiian Champion
- 2006 Hawaii Billabong Junior Champion
- 2007 Sunset Beach WCT - Trials winner (quarter final finish)
- 2007 VQS Championship - 1st place
- 2007 Triple Crown Rookie of the Year
- 2008 US Open Junior Pro Champion
- 2009 Ripcurl Search Portugal Champion
- 2009 ASP Rookie of the Year
- 2010 Bahia Brazil, WQS 4 Star Champion
- 2010 Supergirl Pro Junior 1st place
- 2010 Maresia Girls International, (Brazil) WQS 6 Star -1st place
- 2011 ASP Pro Junior Champion
- 2011 Women's Legendary Pacific Coast Pro, (Newcastle, Australia) WQS 6 Star - Champion
- 2011 World Qualifying Champion
- 2013 ASP Heat Of The Year
- 2014 Los Cabos Open Of Surf WQS 6 Star- Champion
- 2014 Oceano Santa Catarina Pro WQS 6 Star - Champion
- 2016 Supergirl Pro - Champion

Surfer Magazine: Top 5 most popular surfers’ Surfer Poll

- 2010 - 3rd Place
- 2011 – 2nd place
- 2012 – 3rd Place
- 2019 - 6th place

== Filmography ==
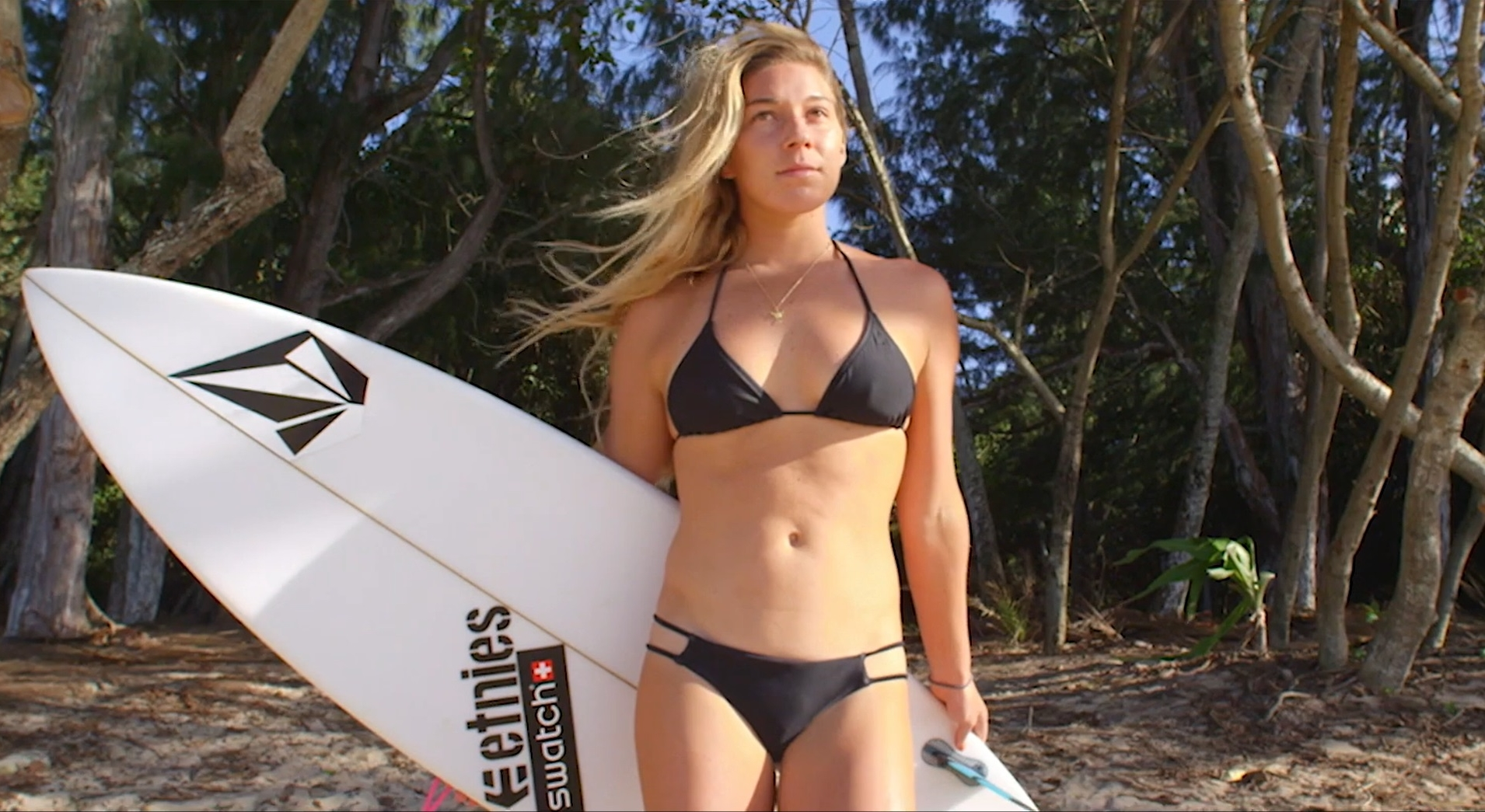
Ho in trailer for She is the Ocean, 2018 film

- 2002 Blue Crush, Young Anne Marie
- 2007 Heart of a Soul Surfer, Self
- 2010 Six Days In Paradise, Alicia McShane
- 2010 First Love, Self
- 2011 Leave A Message, Herself
- 2018 She Is The Ocean, Self
- 2020 Bethany Hamilton: Unstoppable, Self
