= Bede Durbidge =

Australian surfer

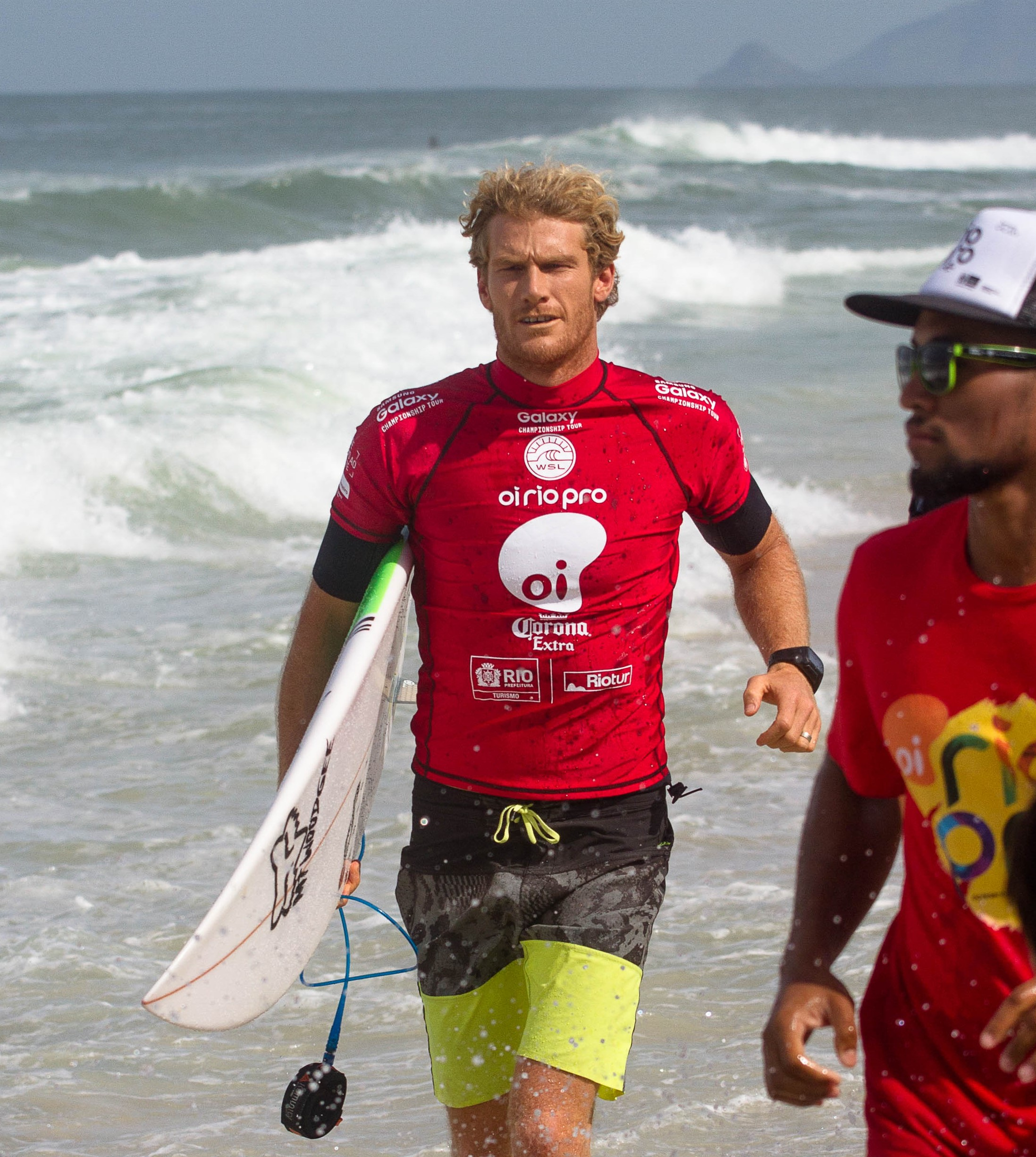

Personal information
- Born: 23 February 1983 (age 43) Brisbane, Queensland, Australia
- Height: 1.85 m (6 ft 1 in)
- Weight: 82 kg (181 lb)

Surfing career
- Sport: Surfing
- Best year: 2nd - 2008 ASP World Tour
- Career earnings: $750,601
- Sponsors: Mt Woodgee, Xcel Wetsuits, Freestyle watches, OAM surfboardsm SeaStradbroke
- Major achievements: 2007 Triple Crown of Surfing; Australian Male Surfer of the Year 2008

Surfing specifications
- Stance: Regular (natural foot)

Bede Durbidge (born 23 February 1983) is an Australian professional surfer competing on the World Surf League World Tour. Durbo, Bej and The White Fijian are his nicknames.

== Life ==
Bede Durbidge was born in Brisbane, Queensland and grew up in Point Lookout, on North Stradbroke Island. He began in the Australasian Junior Series, and after four years in the World Qualifying Series joined the World Championship Tour in 2005.

As a professional, his strongest achievement is winning the Boost Mobile Pro in Trestles, San Clemente, California. Only five waves was enough for him to defeat the seven-time champion Kelly Slater. He later came in second in the Quiksilver Pro Gold Coast of 2007. His best season was 2008, where he finished the ASP world tour as the runner-up overall.

He retired from the World Surf League in 2017, after 13 seasons, including three career victories and three years where he was ranked in the Top 5 (2007-2009). He plans to be the lead coach for Australia's elite surf team program in preparation for the 2020 Summer Olympics in Tokyo, Japan.

== Victories ==
ASP World Tour Wins
Year	Event	Venue	Country
2006	Boost Mobile Pro	Trestles, San Clemente, California	United States
2007	Rip Curl Pipeline Masters	Oahu	Hawaii
2008	Hang Loose Santa Catarina	Florianópolis, Santa Catarina	Brazil

ASP World Tour Runner-ups
Year	Event	Venue	Country
2007	Quiksilver Pro	Gold Coast	Australia
2008	Rip Curl Pro	Bells Beach	Australia
2009	Quiksilver Pro France	Hossegor	France
2009	Rip Curl Search	Peniche	Portugal
2010	Boost Mobile Pro	Trestles, San Clemente, California	United States
2010	Rip Curl Search	Isabela	Puerto Rico
2015	Oi Rio Pro	Rio de Janeiro	Brazil
2015	Quiksilver Pro France	Landes forest, Aquitaine	France

Outside of the ASP World Tour:

- 2007: Vans Triple Crown of Surfing
- 2004: Nokia Lacanau Pacific Motion Pro, Lacanau - France
- 2003: Rip Curl Newquay Board Masters, Newquay - England

=== World Championship Tour Rankings ===
- 2005: 29th (3,612 points)
- 2006: 15th (4,539 points)
- 2007: 5th (5,774 points)
- 2008: 2nd (6,780 points)
- 2009: 3rd (6,468 points)
- 2010: 6th (39,000 points)
- 2011: 16th (26,000 points)
- 2012: 20th (16,250 points)
- 2013: 21st (16,200 points)
- 2014: 16th (28,450 points)
- 2015: 12th (31,700 points)
- 2016: 38th (5,750 points)
- 2017: 24th (20,200 points)

== Personal life ==
His wife, Tarryn, became a social media sensation from the gourmet lunches she made for their daughter Willow.

Durbidge is co-owner of Balter Brewing Company with Joel Parkinson, Josh Kerr and Mick Fanning.
