= Hurley Pro at Trestles =

Surfing competition

Hurley Pro Trestles at the World Surf League
- Location: Trestles, California
- Date: September
- Points awarded: 10,000 (Winner); 8,000 (Runner-up); 6,500 (Semifinalists); 5,200 (Quarterfinalists); 4,000 (Out on Round 5); 1,750 (Out on Round 3); 500 (Out on Round 2); 500 (Injured)
- Total prize money: $579,000

Champions
- Current: Miguel Pupo (BRA) (men) (Canada) Erin Brooks (women) Most wins: Kelly Slater (USA) (6)

The Hurley Pro Trestles is a World Surf League Men's Championship Tour event held in Trestles, California. It debuted in the 2000 ASP World Tour, initially sponsored by Billabong, and has been held annually since 2002.

== Naming ==
Since the birth of this competition it had different names.

== Past finals ==
=== Men's ===
Finished season as world champion

Season	Winner	Score	Runner-up	Score
Billabong Pro at Trestles
2000	(Hawaii) Andy Irons	22.45	(Australia) Jake Paterson	21.20
Boost Mobile Pro
2002	(Australia) Luke Egan	25.15	(Australia) Michael Campbell	23.75
2003	(Australia) Richard Lovett	16.07	(Australia) Taj Burrow	14.20
2004	(Australia) Joel Parkinson	15.17	(United States) Kelly Slater	13.63
2005	(United States) Kelly Slater	15.40	(Australia) Phillip MacDonald	15.00
2006	(Australia) Bede Durbidge	15.83	(United States) Kelly Slater	10.84
2007	(United States) Kelly Slater (2)	13.40	(Hawaii) Pancho Sullivan	10.60
2008	(United States) Kelly Slater (3)	18.97	(Australia) Taj Burrow	18.63
Hurley Pro at Trestles
2009	(Australia) Mick Fanning	17.40	(United States) Dane Reynolds	13.10
2010	(United States) Kelly Slater (4)	18.13	(Australia) Bede Durbidge	14.13
2011	(United States) Kelly Slater (5)	17.50	(Australia) Owen Wright	16.74
2012	(United States) Kelly Slater (6)	16.50	(Australia) Joel Parkinson	14.00
2013	(Australia) Taj Burrow	17.07	(Australia) Julian Wilson	15.97
2014	(South Africa) Jordy Smith	16.50	(Hawaii) John John Florence	15.87
2015 (details)	(Australia) Mick Fanning (2)	17.44	(Brazil) Adriano De Souza	16.44
2016 (details)	(South Africa) Jordy Smith (2)	15.80	(Australia) Joel Parkinson	15.36
2017 (details)	(Brazil) Filipe Toledo	15.67	(South Africa) Jordy Smith	9.80
Lexus Trestles Pro
2025	(Brazil) Yago Dora	17.90	(Japan) Kanoa Igarashi	16.07
2026	(Brazil) Miguel Pupo	14.77	(Japan) Kanoa Igarashi	14.40

=== Women's ===
Finished season as world champion

Season	Winner	Score	Runner-up	Score
Body Glove Surfbout
1995	(Hawaii) Rochelle Ballard		(United States) Lisa Andersen	
Wahine Bud Surf Tour
1996	(Hawaii) Megan Abubo		(Hawaii) Rochelle Ballard	
Swatch Women's Pro
2014	(Australia) Stephanie Gilmore	19.50	(Australia) Sally Fitzgibbons	14.03
2015	(Hawaii) Carissa Moore	16.37	(South Africa) Bianca Buitendag	13.84
2016	(Australia) Tyler Wright	17.13	(Australia) Stephanie Gilmore	15.13
Swatch Pro at Trestles
2017	(Brazil) Silvana Lima	17.60	(Australia) Keely Andrew	10.93
Lexus Trestles Pro
2025	(Hawaii) Bettylou Sakura Johnson	17.00	(Australia) Molly Picklum	14.23
2026	(Canada) Erin Brooks	13.00	(Hawaii) Gabriela Bryan	11.90
