= 2008 ASP World Tour =

Professional surfing league season

The 2008 ASP World Tour is a professional competitive surfing league. It is run by the Association of Surfing Professionals.

== Men's World Tour ==
=== Tournaments ===
Date	Location	Country	Event	Winner	Runner-up	Ref
February 23-March 5	Gold Coast	Australia	Quiksilver Pro	Kelly Slater (USA)	Mick Fanning (AUS)	Results
March 18-March 29	Bells Beach	Australia	Rip Curl Pro	Kelly Slater (USA)	Bede Durbidge (AUS)	Results
May 8-May 18	Teahupoo, Tahiti	French Polynesia	Billabong Pro Teahupoo	Bruno Santos (BRA)	Manoa Drollet (PYF)	Results
May 24-June 6	Tavarua	Fiji	Globe Pro	Kelly Slater (USA)	C.J. Hobgood (USA)	Results
July 9-July 20	Jeffreys Bay	South Africa	Billabong Pro	Kelly Slater (USA)	Mick Fanning (AUS)	Results
July 30-August 10	Bali	Indonesia	Rio Curl Pro Search	Bruce Irons (HAW)	Frederick Patacchia (HAW)	Results
September 7-September 13	Trestles	United States	Boost Mobile Pro	Kelly Slater (USA)	Taj Burrow (AUS)	Results
September 19-September 28	Hossegor	France	Quiksilver Pro France	Adrian Buchan (AUS)	Kelly Slater (USA)	Results
September 29-October 12	Mundaka	Spain	Billabong Pro	C.J. Hobgood (USA)	Joel Parkinson (AUS)	Results
October 28-November 5	Santa Catarina	Brazil	Hang Loose Santa Catarina Pro	Bede Durbidge (AUS)	Jeremy Flores (FRA)	Results
December 8-December 20	Pipeline, Hawaii	United States	Billabong Pipeline Masters	Kelly Slater (USA)	Chris Ward (USA)	Results

=== Final standings ===
Rank	Surfer	Country	Points
1	Kelly Slater	United States	8,042
2	Bede Durbidge	Australia	6,780
3	Taj Burrow	Australia	6,324
4	Joel Parkinson	Australia	6,180
5	C.J. Hobgood	United States	5,860
6	Adriano De Souza	Brazil	5,748
7	Adrian Buchan	Australia	5,370
8	Mick Fanning	Australia	5,310
9	Bobby Martinez	United States	5,282
10	Jeremy Flores	France	5,214

== Women's World Tour ==
=== Tournaments ===
Date	Location	Country	Event	Winner	Runner-up	Ref
February 23-March 6	Gold Coast	Australia	Roxy Pro Gold Coast	Sofía Mulánovich (PER)	Samantha Cornish (AUS)	Report
March 19-March 24	Bells Beach	Australia	Rip Curl Pro	Stephanie Gilmore (AUS)	Sofía Mulánovich (PER)	Report
August 28-September 1	Hossegor	France	Rip Curl Pro Mademoiselle	Stephanie Gilmore (AUS)	Layne Beachley (AUS)	Report
September 11-September 18	Rio de Janeiro	Brazil	Billabong Girls Pro Rio	Melanie Bartels (HAW)	Sofía Mulánovich (PER)	Report
October 7-October 12	Manly Beach	Australia	Beachley Classic	Tyler Wright* (AUS)	Silvana Lima (BRA)	Report
October 27-November 3	Máncora	Peru	Movistar Classic	Stephanie Gilmore (AUS)	Silvana Lima (BRA)	Report
November 24-December 6	Sunset Beach, Hawaii	United States	Roxy Pro	Stephanie Gilmore (AUS)	Silvana Lima (BRA)	Report
December 8-December 20	Honolua Bay, Hawaii	United States	Billabong Pro	Stephanie Gilmore (AUS)	Melanie Bartels (HAW)	Report

(*) denotes wildcard surfer

=== Final standings ===
Rank	Surfer	Country	Points
1	Stephanie Gilmore	Australia	7,188
2	Silvana Lima	Brazil	5,534
3	Sofía Mulánovich	Peru	5,323
4	Layne Beachley	Australia	5,210
5	Amee Donohoe	Australia	4,051
6	Samantha Cornish	Australia	3,972
7	Melanie Bartels	Hawaii	3,876
8	Rebecca Woods	Australia	3,602
9	Jessi Miley-Dyer	Australia	3,564
10	Jacqueline Silva	Brazil	3,398
