= 2010 ASP World Tour =

Professional surfing league season

The 2010 ASP World Tour was a season of professional competitive surfing run by the World Surf League. Men and women compete in separate tours with events taking place from late February to mid-December, at various surfing locations around the world.

Surfers receive points for their best events. The surfer with the most points at the end of the tour is announced the 2010 ASP world champion.

== Men's Championship Tour ==
=== Tournaments ===
Date	Location	Country	Event	Winner	Runner-up	Ref
February 27–March 10	Gold Coast	Australia	Quiksilver Pro	Taj Burrow (AUS)	Jordy Smith (RSA)	Results
March 30–April 10	Bells Beach	Australia	Rip Curl Pro	Kelly Slater (USA)	Mick Fanning (AUS)	Results
April 23–May 2	Santa Catarina	Brazil	Santa Catarina Pro	Jadson André (BRA)	Kelly Slater (USA)	Results
July 15–July 25	Jeffreys Bay	South Africa	Billabong Pro Jeffreys Bay	Jordy Smith (RSA)	Adam Melling (AUS)	Results
August 23–September 3	Teahupo'o, Tahiti	French Polynesia	Billabong Pro Teahupoo	Andy Irons (HAW)	C.J. Hobgood (USA)	Results
September 12–September 18	Trestles	United States	Hurley Pro	Kelly Slater (USA)	Bede Durbidge (AUS)	Results
September 25–October 5	Hossegor	France	Quiksilver Pro France	Mick Fanning (AUS)	Kelly Slater (USA)	Results
October 7–October 18	Peniche	Portugal	Rip Curl Pro Portugal	Kelly Slater (USA)	Jordy Smith (RSA)	Results
October 30–November 10	Isabela	Puerto Rico	Rip Curl Search	Kelly Slater (USA)	Bede Durbidge (AUS)	Results
December 8–December 20	Pipeline, Oahu	Hawaii	Billabong Pipeline Masters	Jeremy Flores (FRA)	Kieren Perrow (AUS)	Results

(*) denotes wildcard surfer

=== Final standings ===
Rank	Name	Country	Points
1	Kelly Slater	United States	69,000
2	Jordy Smith	South Africa	52,250
3	Mick Fanning	Australia	44,750
4	Taj Burrow	Australia	42,000
4	Dane Reynolds	United States	42,000
6	Bede Durbidge	Australia	39,000
7	Adrian Buchan	Australia	37,250
8	Owen Wright	Australia	37250
9	Jeremy Flores	France	35,750
10	Adriano De Souza	Brazil	32,000

== Women's Championship Tour ==
=== Tournaments ===
Date	Location	Country	Event	Winner	Runner-up	Ref
February 27–March 10	Gold Coast	Australia	Roxy Pro Gold Coast	Stephanie Gilmore (AUS)	Melanie Bartels (HAW)	Results
March 30–April 5	Bells Beach	Australia	Rip Curl Women's Pro	Stephanie Gilmore (AUS)	Sofía Mulánovich (PER)	Results
April 11–April 16	Taranaki	New Zealand	TSB Bank Women's Surf Festival	Carissa Moore (HAW)	Sally Fitzgibbons (AUS)	Results
April 21–April 26	Dee Why	Australia	Commonwealth Bank Beachley Classic	Stephanie Gilmore (AUS)	Sally Fitzgibbons (AUS)	Results
June 5–June 9	San Bartolo	Peru	Movistar Peru Classic	Silvana Lima (BRA)	Sally Fitzgibbons (AUS)	Results
October 7–October 11	Peniche	Portugal	Rip Curl Pro	Carissa Moore (HAW)	Stephanie Gilmore (AUS)	Results
October 30–November 4	Isabela	Puerto Rico	Rip Curl Search	Stephanie Gilmore (AUS)	Carissa Moore (HAW)	Results
November 24–December 6	Sunset Beach, Oahu	Hawaii	O'Neill Women's World Cup	Tyler Wright (AUS)	Coco Ho (HAW)	Results

=== Final standings ===
Rank	Name	Country	Points
1	Stephanie Gilmore	Australia	7,284
2	Sally Fitzgibbons	Australia	5,634
3	Carissa Moore	Hawaii	5,196
4	Silvana Lima	Brazil	4,716
5	Sofía Mulánovich	Peru	4,704
6	Chelsea Hedges	Australia	4,488
7	Coco Ho	Hawaii	4,296
8	Melanie Bartels	Hawaii	4,092
9	Paige Hareb	New Zealand	3,096
10	Rebecca Woods	Australia	2,904
