= 2011 ASP World Tour =

Professional surfing league season

The 2011 ASP World Tour was a professional competitive surfing league run by the Association of Surfing Professionals. Men and women competed in separate tours with events taking place from late February to mid-December, at various surfing locations around the world.

Surfers received points for their best events. The surfer with the most points at the end of the tour was announced the 2011 ASP surfing World Champion.

== Men's World Tour ==
=== Tournaments ===
Date	Location	Country	Event	Winner	Runner-up	Prize money	Ref
February 26–March 9	Gold Coast	Australia	Quiksilver Pro	Kelly Slater (USA)	Taj Burrow (AUS)	$425,000	Report
April 19–April 30	Bells Beach	Australia	Rip Curl Pro	Joel Parkinson (AUS)	Mick Fanning (AUS)	$425,000	Report
May 11–May 22	Rio de Janeiro	Brazil	Billabong Rio Pro	Adriano De Souza (BRA)	Taj Burrow (AUS)	$500,000	Report
July 14–July 24	Jeffreys Bay	South Africa	Billabong Pro Jeffreys Bay	Jordy Smith (RSA)	Mick Fanning (AUS)	$425,000	Report
August 20–August 31	Teahupoo, Tahiti	French Polynesia	Billabong Pro Teahupoo	Kelly Slater (USA)	Owen Wright (AUS)	$425,000	Report
September 4–September 9	Long Island, New York	United States	Quiksilver Pro New York	Owen Wright (AUS)	Kelly Slater (USA)	$1,000,000	Report
September 18–September 21	Trestles, California	United States	Hurley Pro	Kelly Slater (USA)	Owen Wright (AUS)	$425,000	Report
October 4–October 12	South West Coast	France	Quiksilver Pro France	Gabriel Medina (BRA)	Julian Wilson (AUS)	$425,000	Report
October 15–October 18	Peniche	Portugal	Rip Curl Pro Portugal	Adriano De Souza (BRA)	Kelly Slater (USA)	$425,000	Report
November 1–November 7	San Francisco	United States	Rip Curl Search	Gabriel Medina (BRA)	Joel Parkinson (AUS)	$425,000	Report
December 8–December 10	Pipeline, Hawaii	United States	Billabong Pipeline Masters	Kieren Perrow (AUS)	Joel Parkinson (AUS)	$425,000	Report

=== Final Standings ===
Rank	Name	Country	Points
1	Kelly Slater	United States	68,100
2	Joel Parkinson	Australia	56,100
3	Owen Wright	Australia	47,900
4	Taj Burrow	Australia	45,450
5	Adriano De Souza	Brazil	44,950
6	Michel Bourez	French Polynesia	38,650
7	Jordy Smith	South Africa	38,250
8	Josh Kerr	Australia	37,750
9	Julian Wilson	Australia	37,100
10	Alejo Muniz	Brazil	33,100

== Women's World Tour ==
=== Tournaments ===
Date	Location	Country	Event	Winner	Runner-up	Prize Money	Ref
February 26–March 9	Gold Coast	Australia	Roxy Pro Gold Coast	Carissa Moore (HAW)	Tyler Wright (AUS)	$110,000	Report
April 9–April 25	Bells Beach	Australia	Rip Curl Women's Pro	Sally Fitzgibbons (AUS)	Carissa Moore (HAW)	$110,000	Report
April 27–May 1	Taranaki	New Zealand	Subaru Pro TSB Bank Women's Surf Festival	Sally Fitzgibbons (AUS)	Carissa Moore (HAW)	$100,000	Report
May 3–May 8	Dee Why, New South Wales	Australia	Commonwealth Bank Beachley Classic	Carissa Moore (HAW)	Sofia Mulanovich (PER)	$140,000	Report
May 12–May 16	Rio de Janeiro	Brazil	Billabong Rio Pro	Carissa Moore (HAW)	Sally Fitzgibbons (AUS)	$120,000	Report
July 11–July 17	Biarritz	France	Roxy Pro France	Stephanie Gilmore (AUS)	Carissa Moore (HAW)	$110,000	Report
August 1–August 6	Huntington Beach	United States	U.S. Open of Surfing	Sally Fitzgibbons (AUS)	Lakey Peterson (USA)	$110,000	Report

=== Final Standings ===
Rank	Name	Country	Points
1	Carissa Moore	Hawaii	55,000
2	Sally Fitzgibbons	Australia	51,650
3	Stephanie Gilmore	Australia	40,550
4	Tyler Wright	Australia	34,620
5	Silvana Lima	Brazil	33,120
6	Coco Ho	Hawaii	33,000
7	Sofia Mulanovich	Peru	31,200
8	Courtney Conlogue	United States	30,400
9	Pauline Ado	France	26,825
10	Laura Enever	Australia	24,575
