= Stephanie Gilmore =

Australian surfer (born 1988)

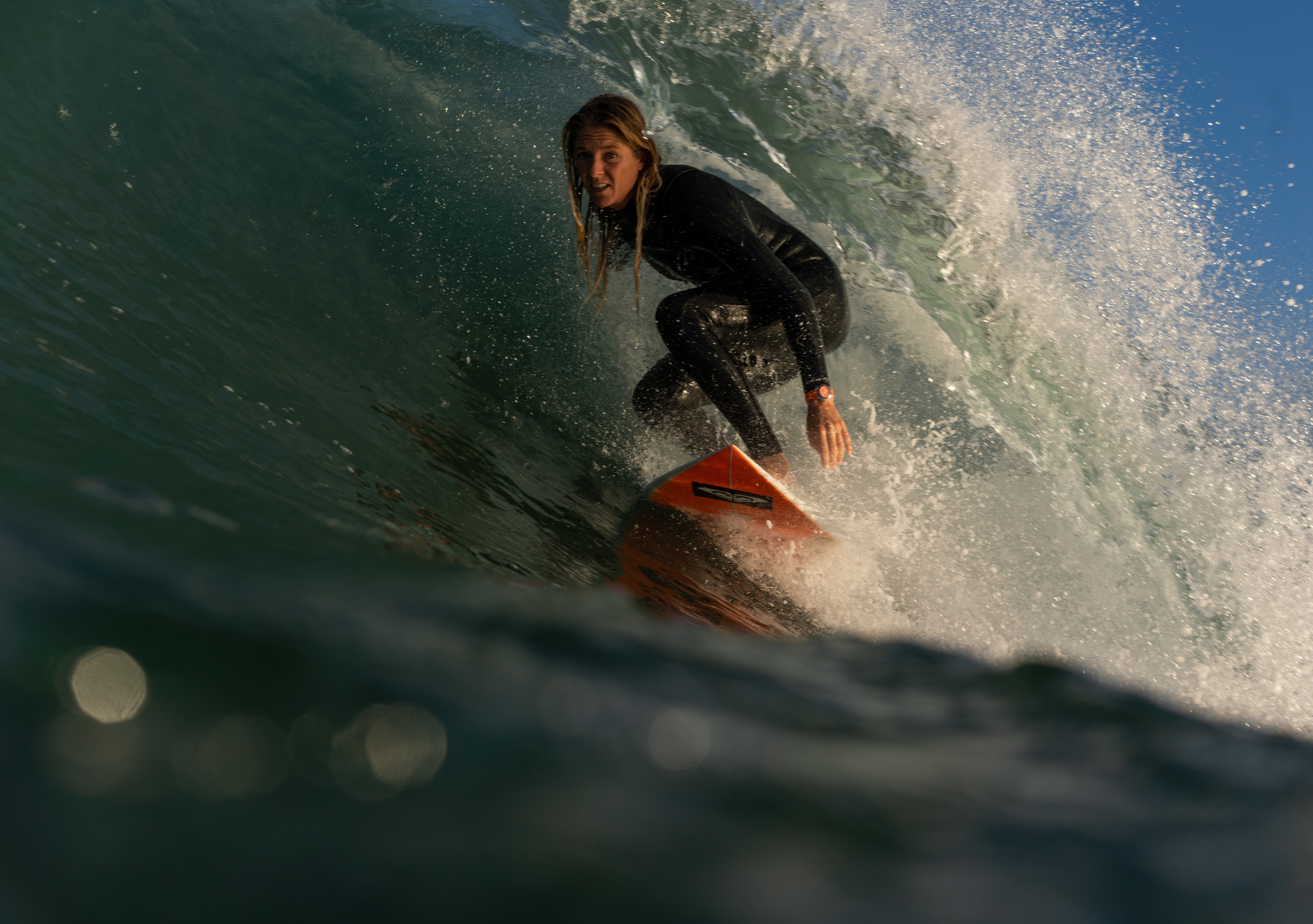
- Gilmore in 2021

Personal information
- Nickname: Steph
- Born: 29 January 1988 (age 38) Murwillumbah, New South Wales, Australia
- Height: 178 cm (5 ft 10 in)

Surfing career
- Sport: Surfing
- Best year: Ranked first on the World Surf League: 2007, 2008, 2009, 2010, 2012, 2014, 2018, 2022
- Major achievements: 8x World Champion (2007, 2008, 2009, 2010, 2012, 2014, 2018, 2022); WSL Championship Tour event wins: 35; 2007 WSL Rookie of the Year; Surfers' Hall of Fame inductee

Surfing specifications
- Stance: Natural (regular) foot
- Quiver: 5'11" to 6'8"

Stephanie Louise Gilmore (born 29 January 1988) is an Australian professional surfer and eight-time world champion on the women's World Surf League (WSL) professional tour. She is considered to be one of the greatest surfers of all time, with the most world titles and event victories in the history of the women's WSL and its predecessor, the Association of Surfing Professionals (ASP). She also remains the only surfer in history of the professional tour to win a world title in their debut season of the tour, going on to win four world titles in a row from 2007 to 2010.

Gilmore began her professional career as a 17-year-old, winning her first event as a wildcard in 2005, qualifying for the professional tour two years later. After her run of four consecutive world titles, she won her fifth world title in 2012, after being injured throughout 2011. Her sixth world title in 2014 is considered to be one of the most exciting seasons in women's surfing, with the race coming down to the final heat of the season. After three seasons of inconsistent form, Gilmore won her seventh world title in 2018. Her eighth world title in 2022 came under unique circumstances. Ranked as the fifth seed in the WSL final, she won every heat throughout the day to beat rival Carissa Moore and emerge as champion. She took a competitive hiatus in 2024 and 2025.

Gilmore is credited with pushing women's surfing to equal standing with the men's event, both as a competitor and as an advocate. She was a driving force behind the women's tour receiving equal prize money to the men and equal priority in competitive wave selection. She is also one of Australia's most endorsed athletes, named the highest-earning Australian female athlete in 2015, with her contracts with Rip Curl and Quiksilver's female-focused brand Roxy among the most lucrative in Australian surfing.

== Early years ==
Gilmore was born in Murwillumbah, New South Wales. Her father was a surfer, who Gilmore described as "a bit of a hippy", while her mother worked as a primary school teacher. She has two older sisters, Bonnie and Whitney.

She began to surf when her father would pick her up after school, and go to their local beach in Kingscliff, with Gilmore asked to decide to wait on the beach or come surfing, choosing the latter. Her first experience in the surf was riding a boogie board in the waves while being "towed" by her father at the age of nine. She would surf regularly with him, calling her love for the sport "a healthy addiction" and was "not something to take too seriously." Her family would drive to Byron Bay during school holidays to surf and "pull up at the caravan park and pitch the tent, and mum and dad would just hang out while we'd all go surfing at the Pass."

She attended Kingscliff High School, sitting her Higher School Certificate days after winning her second junior world-title and graduated from Year 12 in 2005.

== Professional surfing career ==
=== 2005–2006: Wildcard appearances ===
While completing her final year of school, Gilmore began competing in world tour events as a wild card competitor, which included a victory at the 2005 Roxy Pro Gold Coast.

In her next season, Gilmore won another event as a wild card, the 2006 Beachley Classic, defeating the event's namesake, Layne Beachley in the final, a moment considered to be a 'changing of the guard'. In addition to wild card appearances, Gilmore joined the ASP Qualifying Series, finishing second overall and qualifying for the 2007 ASP World Tour.

=== 2007: Debut season and first world title ===
Gilmore became ranked world number one for the first time after winning at Bells Beach, reaching the same number of points as 2005 world champion Chelsea Hedges, with her road to victory including her beating 2004 world champion Sofía Mulánovich in the final. The next event took place in Brazil in August, with Gilmore earning the overall lead by finishing in the semifinal. After finishing ninth in the event in Spain, Gilmore dropped to world number four. Gilmore was able to win the next event in Sydney, beating Silvana Lima in the final, becoming world number one again heading into the final events of the season.

Entering the final round in the Billabong Pro Maui, continuing to be ranked world number one; her other world title contenders—Mulánovich and Lima—both lost during round three, meaning Gilmore had won the world title. Gilmore was not expecting to seal the world title as quickly during the event, describing the events that unfolded as "a shock." She became the first rookie, on the women's tour, to win a world title. Gilmore still considers her 2007 world title "very memorable," given that it was both her first title and her debut season.

=== 2008–2010: Undefeated world title streak ===
In her first competition in the 2008 season, Gilmore finished ninth at Snapper Rocks, although was able to win at Bells Beach for the second consecutive year. Gilmore became the leader in the world title race after a win in Peru for the second consecutive season, beating Beachley and Lima enroute, as Mulánovich was surprisingly eliminated in the quarterfinals. At Sunset Beach, two rounds left in the season, Gilmore, Beachley, Mulánovich and Lima were all still in contention to win the world title, but all had to win the event to prevent Gilmore from winning the title with one event left to spare. The final was contested by Lima and Gilmore, with Gilmore receiving the highest-scoring wave of the four-person final and solidifying the world title for the second consecutive year.

Gilmore began her 2009 season intending to win her home event, Snapper Rocks, which she eventually accomplished, while also being conscious of a new generation of rookies entering the tour, including future championship rival Sally Fitzgibbons. A loss to Lima in the final of Bells Beach, her first loss at the event in her competitive career, Gilmore continued to maintain her world number one standing. In 2009, Gilmore remained number one in the world, leading into Peru. She sealed her third consecutive world title in a row at Sunset Beach, when her world championship rivals lost in previous heats, leaving Gilmore the last woman standing. She finished her season by winning the Billabong Pro Maui, securing a triple crown title for the second consecutive year, beating Mulánovich by eight points in the final. When asked about whether she had anything else left to prove, she replied, "I feel like I've got nothing left to prove really and I'm just working on my own performance in the water." With her performances throughout the 2009 season, Gilmore was awarded the Laureus World Sports Award for Action Sportsperson of the Year in 2010.

In 2010, Gilmore's road to the road title began with winning at Snapper Rocks for the second consecutive year. In addition, she reclaimed her title at Bell's Beach, beating Fitzgibbons in the semi-final and Mulánovich in the final, although nearly had a premature departure from the competition when she narrowly beat newcomer Tyler Wright in round three. The event in Taranaki, New Zealand, saw Gilmore suffer a surprise loss to New Zealand teenager Sarah Mason in the third round. She also was eliminated in the third round at the US Open of Surfing event in Huntington Beach. Gilmore sealed her fourth consecutive world title when reaching the quarterfinal of the second last event of the season in Puerto Rico, with a 0.10 point victory over Melanie Bartels. When asked about how she felt achieving the accomplishment, she replied, "Not even in my wildest dreams did I think I could win consecutively like this." In the process, she became the first person in the history of the ASP to win four consecutive world titles in her first four seasons on the professional circuit. In celebrating Gilmore's world title, fellow Australian world champion Mick Fanning praised her ability to "keep that focus for so long", declaring his belief that she could win ten world titles if she wanted to. Gilmore would also go on to win in Puerto Rico, beating Carissa Moore in the final. She was inducted into the Surfers' Hall of Fame.

On 27 December 2010, Gilmore was walking home from the movie theatres after a close friend who was originally meant to meet up with her could not make it at the last minute, when she was attacked twice by a homeless man with a metal bar as she approached her apartment, with hits to her head and her arm. She was admitted to the hospital with cuts to the head and a broken wrist that she used to shield herself. Her attacker, who was suffering from schizophrenia and under consumption of alcohol and drugs, was sentenced to four years in jail. Spending weeks away from surfing to recover, Gilmore when reflecting on the period in 2019, stated, "It was the first time in my life that I had such a traumatic experience and such a mountain to climb ahead of me.”

=== 2011: Personal struggles and first championship loss ===
At the beginning of the year, Gilmore signed a multi-million-dollar brand endorsement and sponsorship deal with Quiksilver. In the lead-up to the 2011 season, her sister and manager, Whitney, banned members of the media from talking to Gilmore, except for pre-arranged interviews, with questions about her attack being off-limits. She briefly discussed the effect that the attack had on her mentally before Bells Beach, citing the uncertainty behind how she would cope with it, "I've never had a trauma in my life like that and I was just as interested as everyone else to see how I was going to deal with it." Her broken wrist made it challenging to surf, with falls off the surfboard exacerbating the pain, which would continue to be an issue over the next two seasons.

At Snapper Rocks, the first event of the season, Gilmore lost in the quarterfinals after only six weeks of preparation, stating she was "behind the pack, behind the eight ball." At Bells Beach, she was eliminated in the semi-finals by Fitzgibbons, with her wrist injury still making it challenging for her to compete. The event in Rio de Janeiro in May, saw Gilmore eliminated from contention for the world title for the first time in her career, with a loss in the semi-finals to world number two, Sally Fitzgibbons, after being required to finish above world number one, Carissa Moore, to stay within reach. Ironically, Gilmore would end Fitzgibbons world title chances in Biarritz, France, by winning the event over the newly-crowned world champion, Moore. Gilmore's mental health continued to suffer, which affected her performance on the tour throughout the season, "I think the hardest part was, because I'd won four world titles back-to-back, I didn't know what losing was like and to lose that winning streak due to something that was out of my control seemed like such a bummer." When reflecting on the season in a 2019 interview, Gilmore stated, “I was questioning my confidence in the ocean. I was questioning just everything.” Gilmore would finish third overall in the year to Moore, who ousted her as the youngest world champion in women's surfing history.

=== 2012–2013: Fifth world title and struggles with fatigue ===
Gilmore's journey to her fifth world title in 2012 began with a win at Snapper Rocks, with a final against Laura Enever. After the challenges she faced in the previous year, Gilmore said she was "100 per cent more confident, my strength, my whole knowledge, awareness, everything." After a second place to Sally Fitzgibbons at Bells Beach, Gilmore won her second event of the season in Taranaki, defeating defending world champion Carissa Moore in the final by 0.7 points. Gilmore solidified her world title in July with her third event win of the year in Biarritz, France, defeating Tyler Wright in the final, while her only other title contender, Fitzgibbons, was beaten in the quarterfinals, making Gilmore's lead unassailable heading into the final event in Huntington Beach, California. Gilmore has called this world title, in particular, her most "rewarding", describing it as the first time she "had to really persevere through something", and the first world title since her attack in 2010.

After the high of achieving her fifth world title, Gilmore admitted to feeling "uninspired" in 2013, struggling with fatigue in a season that became her worst of her career to date. Additionally, at Bells Beach, Gilmore, suffering from a broken foot sustained before the event, was eliminated in the quarterfinals by Wright and faced sudden-death rounds twice along the way. Gilmore reflected on the form of her fellow surfers being "much better" and was already eliminated from the world title race before the event in Hossegor, France. Gilmore would go without an event win for the first time in a season and finished fifth in the world.

=== 2014: An "intense" sixth world title ===
Gilmore began the 2014 season by winning her first tour event in two years at her hometown event, Snapper Rocks, defeating reigning world champion Moore in the semi-finals and Bianca Buitendag in the final. Her victory was her first event win since winning Biarritz, France in 2012. She described how she found her "confidence" and "self-belief" with a new approach to the tour, taking a more strategic approach in competition. Gilmore would become world number one heading into the next event in Margaret River, making it to the semi-finals after winning her quarterfinal against Courtney Conlogue by 0.2 points, setting up another duel against Moore, who would eliminate Gilmore from the event. Gilmore progressed to the semi-finals at Bells Beach alongside her future world title rivals Fitzgibbons, Moore, and Wright, as the latter would eliminate Gilmore in the semi finals. Rio became Gilmore's worst event of the season, eliminated in the second round by former world title rival Silvana Lima. In Cloudbreak, Fiji, a showdown with Sally Fitzgibbons, their first of three for the season, saw Fitzgibbons narrowly beat Gilmore by 0.27 points, despite Gilmore leading for a majority of the heat. At the end of the event in Fiji, Gilmore would be ranked third in the world, behind Moore and Fitzgibbons.

Gilmore moved up to number two in the world, with a win against Fitzgibbons in Trestles, with Gilmore achieving the event's sole perfect-10 wave against Fitzgibbons in the final, who became world number one after Moore was eliminated before the quarterfinals. Gilmore declared after the event in Trestles that the world title race between herself, Fitzgibbons, Moore and Tyler Wright would "be a really exciting finish," with only two events left in Cascais and Maui. In the next event, Gilmore took over the world number one ranking for the first time since winning Snapper Rocks after winning the Cascais Pro in Portugal, beating Fitzgibbons again in the final, marking their third final matchup of the season.

Considered to be one of the best years of competition on the women's tour that the sport had seen, a season that saw the lead change on multiple occasions, Gilmore expressed her excitement and the "benefit" of having a close title race. The world title came down to the final round in Maui, with only Gilmore, Fitzgibbons and Wright still in contention, guaranteeing an Australian world champion. Gilmore was surprisingly eliminated from the Maui event in the quarterfinals by Courtney Conlogue, meaning her fate would rest in the hands of the performances of Fitzgibbon and Wright. Fitzgibbons would also be beaten in her quarterfinal match only thirty minutes later, solidifying Gilmore as at least world number two, as Wright progressed through to the final against Moore, with Wright requiring an event win to equal Gilmore and force a surf-off for the world title. Wright would go on to lose to Moore, thus making Gilmore the world champion. Gilmore described winning the world title as "the most intense world title race of my career."

=== 2015–2017: Injuries and inconsistency ===
Gilmore's 2015 world title campaign began with two losses to Moore in the finals at both Snapper Rocks and Bells Beach. Although a hair-line fracture in her knee, sustained during the Margaret River Pro, ruled her out for most of the season. Gilmore revealed that most of 2015 consisted of her watching "from the computer screen" and was "jealous" that she could not go and compete. She briefly returned to the tour, competing at the event in France before withdrawing again, missing the final event in Maui.

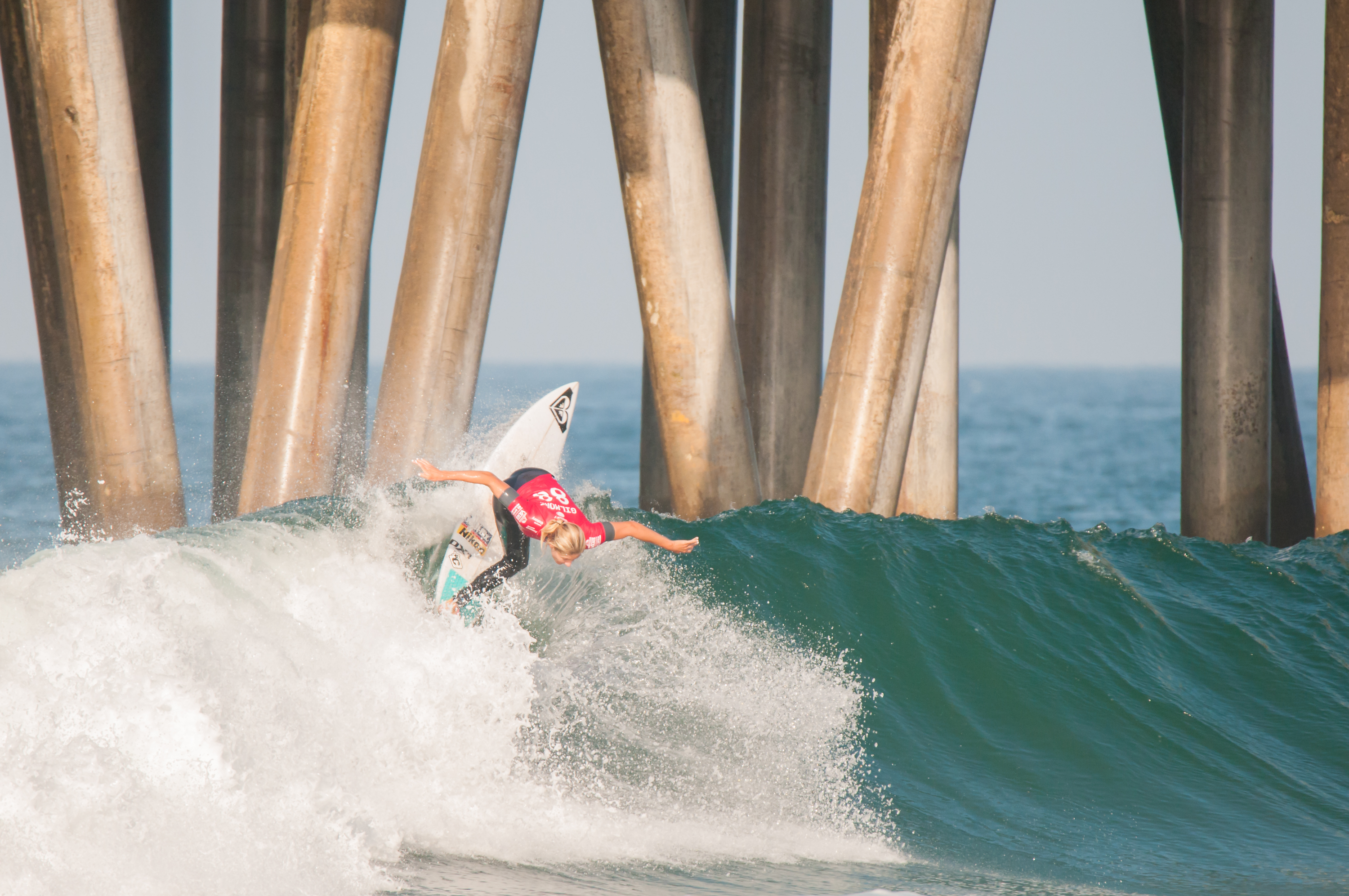
Gilmore competing at the US Open of Surfing in Huntington Beach, California during the 2016 WSL season.

A challenger event in Newcastle that took place before the first event of the 2016 season, saw Gilmore lose to Fitzgibbons in the final, revealing her knee had fully healed and she was fit to compete. Beginning the season as the oldest surfer on the tour, Gilmore was eliminated in the quarterfinals of Snapper Rocks by Wright. She would finish the year being knocked out in the fourth round in Maui, in a season that would see her ranked sixth overall.

Gilmore began 2017 by winning her first tour event since 2014 in Snapper Rocks, beating Lakey Peterson in the final by 3.98 points. Her run to the event win included beating Carissa Moore in the quarterfinals and Sally Fitzgibbons in the semi-final. She signalled her intentions before the event began to reclaim the world title, citing confidence in her equipment, improved physical health, and experience chasing world titles. She also discussed the increased difficulty in contending for a world title, with more women in contention than in seasons past, specifically naming Fitzgibbons, Moore, Wright and Courtney Conlogue. She continued her good start to the season, finishing second to Conlogue at Bells Beach; and making it to the semi-finals at Margaret River. Her strong start during the Australian leg of the season unfortunately did not continue for the rest of the season, not finishing above the quarterfinals until the final event of the season in Maui, describing her form after Margaret River as "a hot mess." Gilmore would go on to win the event in Maui, finishing as number two in the world, behind world champion, Wright.

=== 2018: Seventh world title ===
Gilmore's 2018 season began with an elimination in the quarterfinals by Keely Andrew at Snapper Rocks. Gilmore's first victory of the season came at Bells Beach, her first at the event since 2010, with a close final between her and Tatiana Weston-Webb coming down to the final wave, winning by 0.23. She would become world number one again leading into Margaret River, reaching the quarterfinal, only for the event to be postponed by the World Surf League due to safety concerns. Her second event win of the year came in Rio, beating Lakey Peterson in the final, which was also Gilmore's first win in Brazil and kept her as world number one. Her third and final event win of the year came in Jeffreys Bay, South Africa, where she beat Peterson in the final for the second time.

Gilmore would have been able to win her seventh world title during the event in France, only to be eliminated by Conlogue in the third round, thus forcing a final event showdown in Maui against Peterson. Gilmore elaborated that her love of surfing helped her stay relaxed throughout the final event in Maui, particularly when Peterson was surprisingly eliminated in round two, ensuring Gilmore would be world champion. In the process, Gilmore equalled Layne Beachley's record of seven world-title victories, with Gilmore immediately praising Beachley as an "inspiration" and "setting the standard" for women in surfing.

Throughout the season, the World Surf League announced that beginning in the 2019 season, female surfers would be awarded equal amounts of prize money to their male counterparts. Gilmore stated that the decision was "a huge step forward and win for females and society in general." Gilmore also said she was "honoured" to see the change occur within her career and hoped that the change will "affect will be far beyond sport."

=== 2019–2021: COVID-19 break and Olympics ===
Gilmore's first events of the season at Snapper Rocks and Bells Beach saw quarterfinal exits from both competitions. After a victory in Bali, which included a 10-point wave in the competition, Gilmore's hot-and-cold season continued with a loss in the quarterfinals in Margaret River. Her coach, Jake Patterson described Gilmore as being "worn out and flat" and Gilmore being her own "biggest critic," with an injury sustained throughout the season shifting her focus from winning the world title to "cruising the year out." Gilmore finished her season with a win at the Maui Pro over Wright in the final. She would finish fourth in the world, with her results throughout the season were enough for Gilmore to earn Australia's quota position for the 2020 Summer Olympics, the sports debut in the Olympic Games. With the COVID-19 outbreak occurring, the 2020 season was eventually cancelled, with the Olympic Games postponed to the next year. Gilmore would not be scheduled to compete again on the tour until December 2020.

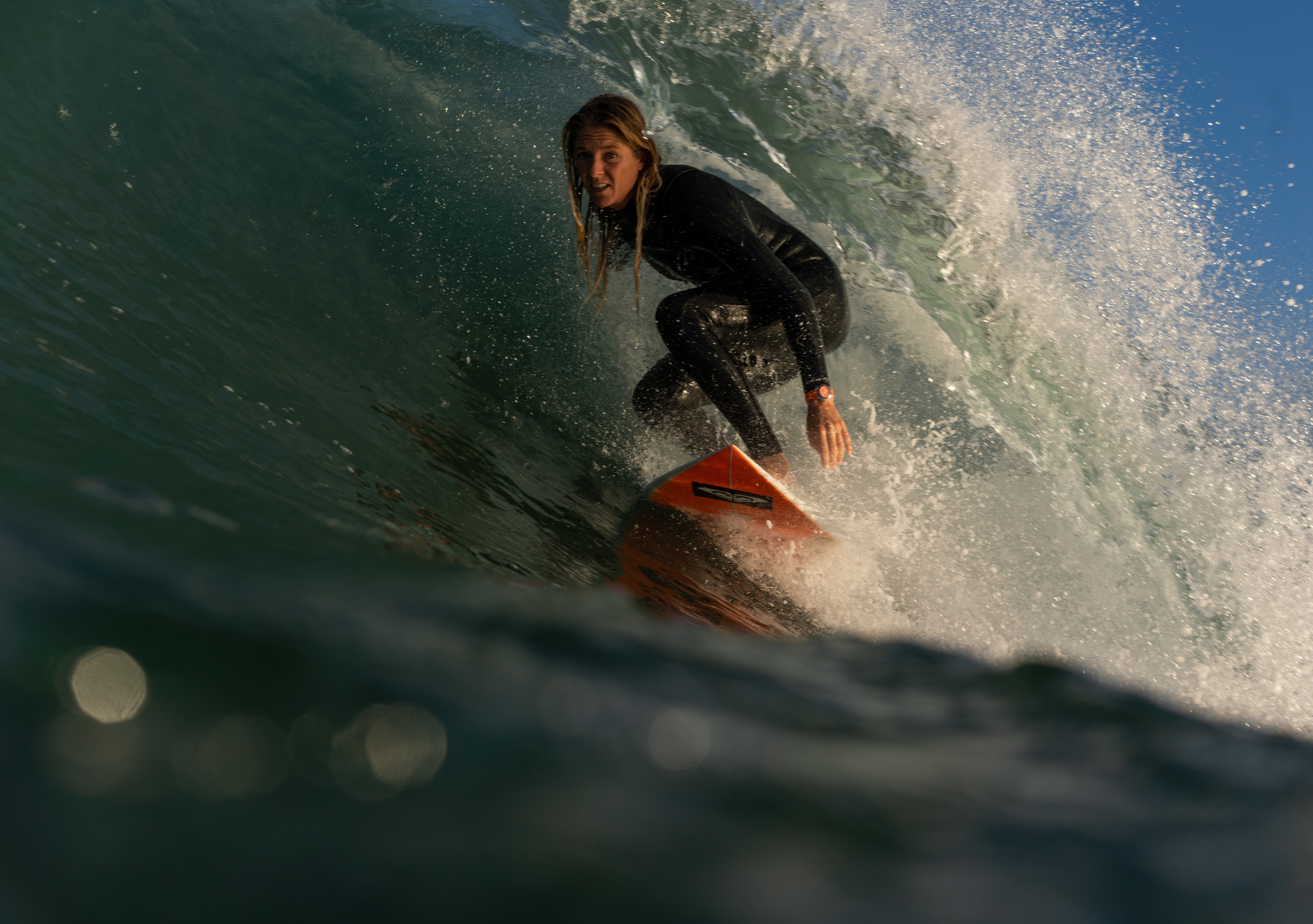
Gilmore surfing in Capbreton, France in 2021

Returning from the COVID-19 hiatus in 2021, the season became what Gilmore dubbed a "heartbreaking year," with her goals of winning her eighth world title and a historic Olympic gold medal not accomplished. Gilmore's first of two finals of the season was a loss at Margaret River, with the rest of the season summed up by Gilmore saying, "I didn't perform to my ability." At the Olympics, she received a bye in round two, only to be beaten by Bianca Buitendag in round three in a surprise loss, with Gilmore making a crucial error as Buitendag took the highest-scoring wave of the round under Gilmore's priority. Despite feeling heartbroken about her exit from the competition, she was still pleased to say, "I still get to call myself an Olympian, which is pretty rad." Gilmore managed to win the final event of the regular season in Mexico, her first event win since 2019, before the newly installed WSL final, entering the final event of the season ranked fourth in the world. She would lose in the first round of the WSL finals, with the world title being won by Moore.

=== 2022: A season of challenges and an eighth world title ===
Gilmore missed the first event of the season, Pipeline, after testing positive for COVID-19 and was required to isolate under event protocols. Her only win of the regular season came at El Salvador, which became her 33rd win on the WSL tour, defeating Lakey Peterson in the final. With eleven minutes left of the final, Gilmore's total score was 1.03 points, only to grab two waves worth 7.33 and 5.67 points to take the lead with less than a few minutes left of the heat. The victory moved her to world number three temporarily, only to drop to world number five at the end of the regular season, barely qualifying for the finals event in Trestles.

At the final event in Trestles, under the finals system, Gilmore competed as the fifth seed and was considered an underdog to win the title as she would have to win every heat in order to be world champion. Gilmore won all the heats in the competition, beginning with narrow victories over world number four Brisa Hennessy and number three Tatiana Weston-Webb. She would defeat second seed Johanne Defay by a gap over six points, with her final match up being between world number one and long-time competitive rival Moore. The final with Moore, being a best-of-3 format, Gilmore won both of the first two heats and guaranteed herself the world title without requiring a third heat, winning each of her heats by a gap of four points. Gilmore felt she had an advantage surfing as the fifth seed, participating in every heat of the day, noticing that Defay and Moore who were watching from the sidelines looked increasingly nervous the longer the event went on and were not given opportunities to practice in the competition waves before their heats took place.

Despite the success, Gilmore disliked the finals format, believing that "the world champ should be crowned in all the different waves over the entire period of the year." She discussed the "guilt" she felt taking the world title away from Moore, describing that with surfing coming down to one event you "could have a bad day", and "Carissa just wasn't on that day." Despite this, she had a brief change of heart after winning her world title and later admitted she enjoyed the "grand final" moment and seeing it as "a phenomenal performance that I should be very proud of."

=== 2023-2025: Missing WSL finals and competition hiatus ===
Beginning the season as the reigning world champion, Gilmore stated her goals in 2023 were to improve at Tahiti and Pipeline specifically, as being waves that "scare the heck out of me." Her first event of the season finished with a round two exit, losing to Caitlin Simmers and Alyssa Spencer in Pipeline, describing it as having "gone from hero to zero." She continued to struggle finding form, surviving the mid-season cut in Margaret River, when she reached the round of 16. She was eliminated in the quarterfinals at Jeffreys Bay by Molly Picklum, although had made her way to world number six before the final regular season event in Tahiti. She was unable to qualify for the WSL finals or defend her world title, finishing in sixth overall, as Tahiti became her final event before going on a hiatus from competition.

Originally, Gilmore announced a year-long sabbatical from the tour, that eventually became two-years, announcing in January 2025 that she would also skip the 2025 WSL Tour after speculation that she was planned to appear for the first stop in Hawai'i. She stated that injuries that had been sustained throughout her competitive career were not completely healed and would instead focus on travelling and sponsor appearances. During Gilmore's hiatus, she continued to be involved in the surfing community. One of these endeavours included signing a multi-million-dollar contract in 2024 to be sponsored by Rip Curl for the next eight years. The decision to take a hiatus from the sport also meant that Gilmore would not contend for a spot at the 2024 Summer Olympics.

Gilmore briefly returned as a wild card for the 2025 Gold Coast Pro, in a run that included knocking out reigning world champion Caitlin Simmers, before losing in the quarterfinals to Erin Brooks. Brooks, was notably only five months old when Gilmore won her first world title in 2007, a fact that Gilmore embraced, comparing the situation to Kelly Slater's on the men's tour. She expressed that she was not considering retirement and was enjoying different pursuits within the sport, while her expectations on performing at competition level had changed with the development of women's surfing as her focus became about "going to enjoy the journey." She also stated her relief in being able to spend more time at home and see her family and friends during her hiatus, while wanting to be able to "travel and surf". Although when asked about a potential return to competitive surfing, she was open to a return to the schedule full-time, stating, "I think it's more about your personal drive and motivation, If I still want it, then I think I can still apply myself and chase after it."

=== 2026: Return to competitive surfing ===
On 19 November 2025, Gilmore announced that she would return to the world tour after a two-year hiatus, being awarded one of two seasonal wildcards alongside fellow world champion Carissa Moore. Gilmore expressed being "excited" to re-enter the challenges of the world tour and feel the "energy" of competition again. In the first two events of the season, she was eliminated at both Bells Beach and Margaret River without recording a heat win, with Gilmore stating she was "rusty" from her "two seasons off." Competing at her home event on the Gold Coast, Gilmore won her first tour event since 2022, beating Luana Silva in the final and registering an overall heat total of 17.33, which included a wave score of 9.50.

== Rivalries ==
=== Gilmore vs. Carissa Moore ===
The rivalry between Gilmore and Hawaiian Carissa Moore is considered one of the strongest in the sport, with both women winning 13 of the 16 world titles between them from 2007 to 2023. Between 2010 and 2015, Gilmore and Moore traded world titles, with Gilmore winning in 2010, 2012 and 2014, while Moore was victorious in 2011, 2013 and 2015. Although world title matchups between the two women were rare during this period, when one was in the running for a world title, the other would struggle or be injured, with 2014 being the sole exception. Moore took the record of being the youngest world champion in 2011, a record Gilmore previously held when she won in 2007. In surfing's first Olympic campaign in 2021, Moore went on to win both of the sport's marquee titles including the sports first Olympic gold medal, Gilmore elaborated after the 2021 season, "I had dreams of an Olympic medal and a World Title, and I had to sit back and watch Carissa win it all", while Gilmore was surprisingly eliminated in the third round of the Olympic Games.

Both women have been involved in close event finals, with one of the first taking place in the 2012 event in Taranaki, as Gilmore defeated Moore by 0.7 of a point. Moore would be the first to beat Gilmore in a final at Gilmore's home event, Snapper Rocks, in 2015, with Gilmore racing out to a lead early only for Moore to score two waves over nine points to win. Their most famous heat notably their 2022 finals series heats for the world title, with Gilmore unexpectedly making a run from fifth to first, beating Moore in both of their best-of-three heats to win the world title. Despite coming out of the final event victorious, Gilmore considers Moore "the true world champion" for her competitive prowess across most events during the year, saying, "A big part of me still thinks the world champion should be crowned over all the different conditions." A victory would have brought Moore one world title away from equalling Gilmore and Layne Beachley's world title record, a fact Gilmore acknowledged. Moore would be given another opportunity to achieve a sixth world title in 2023, once again as number one in the world, although would again lose in the final head-to-head against Caroline Marks.

Both women have been compared to from a young age, both being teenagers when debuting on the tour and both winning multiple world titles in their first four years of competing. The rivalry is a friendly one: while Moore considers Gilmore to be 'the greatest of all time', Gilmore believes the 'greatest' title belongs to Moore instead. Moore specifically points out Gilmore as someone she looks up to, declaring her "a legend of the sport" and has "learnt so much from watching her." Ironically, both women chose to take a career hiatus in 2024, and both would return simultaneously in 2026.

=== Gilmore vs. Sally Fitzgibbons ===
Gilmore has also maintained a domestic rivalry with fellow Australian Sally Fitzgibbons. Gilmore and Fitzgibbons competed against each other since being juniors on the Australian circuit, with Fitzgibbons stating Gilmore gave her a "belief" and a competitive benchmark to strive to after witnessing Gilmore winning the world title in 2007, which followed on from Australia's long, high-performing standards on the women's tour. Both Gilmore and Fitzgibbons were involved in world title showdowns in 2010 and 2012, with Gilmore winning both. Fitzgibbons' semi-final victory in Rio de Janeiro over Gilmore in 2011, eliminated Gilmore from world title contention for the first time in her career; while at the next event in France, Gilmore defeated Fitzgibbons in the semi-final, which saw Fitzgibbons lose the world title to Carissa Moore.

Gilmore and Fitzgibbons have also experienced close heats against one another throughout their career, particularly during their world title battle in 2014. This season saw Gilmore and Fitzgibbons meet in the final on three occasions: Cloudbreak in Fiji, Trestles and Cascais, with Gilmore winning at Trestles with a near-perfect score and at Cascais, where Gilmore overtook Fitzgibbons as world number one; while Fitzgibbons won narrowly in Cloudbreak coming from behind in the last minutes to win. Both women, along with Tyler Wright were in contention for the world title heading into the final event of the season, with Gilmore out of the quarterfinals early, Fitzgibbons had the opportunity to overtake Gilmore and win the title, only to be eliminated from the event in her quarterfinal in the next heat, as Gilmore would go on to win the world title after Wright was eliminated in the final, and Fitzgibbons would finish third.

When comparing herself to Gilmore, Fitzgibbons said in 2018, "I wanted that effortlessness in my surfing, [...] but I had to formulate it in my own way because I don’t think her style could ever be replicated." She still calls Gilmore her "ultimate driver." Both Gilmore and Fitzgibbons were awarded quota spots to represent Australia at the 2020 Summer Olympics.

== Public image ==
=== Endorsements and appearances ===
Gilmore remains one of the most highly sought-after athletes in Australian sport and around the world, with her positive, friendly nature, along with her long blonde hair and smile, with Vogue Australia dubbing her "the picture-perfect surfer girl." She is currently endorsed and sponsored by Rip Curl, signing a multimillion-dollar contract with the company in 2024, in what was reportedly one of the most expensive contracts for an Australian surfer in the sports history. One of the ventures she began with Rip Curl involved designing a beach-wear line for the company, a moment she said was an unexpected venture considering her lack of interest in fashion when beginning her career, stating, “I look back at photos of me when I was a kid and they’re pretty embarrassing. I had terrible style." She was previously sponsored by Quiksilver through its female-focused line, Roxy, from 2012 to 2024. In 2015, she was named Australia's highest-paid female athlete due to her endorsements with Quiksilver, Nikon, Weet-Bix and Ford. In 2022, she was ranked eighth highest-earning Australian female athlete, courtesy of her endorsement deals, as well as her 2022 world title victory which alone earnt her $150,000. Outside of surfing, Gilmore currently has endorsements with Audi, TechnologyOne, YETI and Breitling. She appeared as a guest at the Met Gala in 2015 when recovering from her knee injury. She has also had a Barbie-doll created in her likeness by Mattel as part of a team of female role models created for International Women's Day in 2026.

In addition to endorsements, Gilmore has also featured in documentaries regarding her surfing career. She was notably selected as one of the featured athletes for the World Surf League's docuseries Make or Break on Apple TV. She also starred in a feature-length documentary titled Stephanie in the Water, released in 2014, which detailed her life behind the scenes on the world tour, directed by Ava Warbrick. During her hiatus from competition, Gilmore, in conjunction with her sponsor Rip Curl, joined Rip Curl's The Search alongside Tom Curren, Mason Ho and Mick Fanning.

=== Activism ===
Gilmore is known to be an advocate for women's rights in professional sport, particularly in surfing. When a discussion about labelling and sexualising women in sport after being involved in a controversial advertising campaign for the Roxy Pro in France, Gilmore noted how physical appearances should not take away from highlighting women in sport, saying in 2014, "When girls embrace their femininity and sexuality, it's not taking away from their power and athleticism at all; they're combining the two sides, and that's a very powerful combination for a girl to have." When comparing to women's surfing from the 1970s to the present day, Gilmore credits the "perseverance" of the women from her previous generation through the "tough period" of women's surfing equality, and credits them for inspiring her and her fellow surfers to push the sport forward "through our actions, through our own personal goals, and our own personal missions."

Gilmore played a major role in encouraging the World Surf League to provide equal treatment to male and female athletes, including equal prize money and equal priority in surf conditions. When comparing the difference in treatment between male and female surfers throughout her years on tour, citing how her fellow female surfers were often forced to compete in "conditions that weren't so great," noticing that once the women's tour was given opportunities to compete with better waves, "that has completely accelerated the event." Gilmore was notably critical after the 2013 season, criticising the wave conditions chosen for some of the women's events throughout the year, stating, "My most favourite events are, of course when the waves are good, but also when you're treated like a professional athlete." When discussing her previous experiences in unequal encounters with event organisers, "For probably about 80 percent of my career, it was very much, 'The waves are firing. The men are on'." Gilmore acknowledged the positive change of the rebranding from the ASP to the World Surf League, which gave the women's tour more balance and focus than it had under the old system and previous owners. In 2018, Gilmore, along with Kelly Slater, wrote a letter supporting the World Surf League's equal pay policy when the announcement for equal pay was made. She elaborated on her hope that other sports and occupations around the world would follow surfing's lead in ensuring equality, saying, "The prize money is fantastic, but the message means even more."

=== Legacy ===
Gilmore is considered one of the greatest surfers of all time, with eight world titles and the most event wins of any surfer on the women's tour. Her 2007 world title victory remains the most recent season in history to be won by a surfer in their debut season. Despite the accolades and praise, Gilmore still finds it difficult to believe the praise, with her coach Jake Patterson adding, "My biggest battle is to convince her that she is the best and to believe in it". Fellow surfers such as Layne Beachley, Carissa Moore and Tom Carroll dub Gilmore as being the 'greatest of all time.' Beachley, particularly describing Gilmore as being "a tremendous role model" and "ambassador" for surfing, describing her surfing style and technique as "graceful" and "effortless". Fellow Australian surfer Sally Fitzgibbons, considers Gilmore the most "inspirational" surfer of her generation, citing her technical prowess, variety in manoeuvres and her intelligence in the line-up during competition; crediting her as having "bridged the performance gap between the men and women." Joel Parkinson dubbed Gilmore as "probably the greatest Australian surfer of all time." Gilmore has also been a role model to many surfers throughout the sport, including Molly Picklum, who named her as "the absolute queen of surfing", and Filipe Toledo, who chose to honour Gilmore by wearing her name on the back of his jersey at the Portugal event in 2023, coinciding with International Women's Day.

== Personal life ==
Gilmore is an accomplished guitarist, being taught by her father when she was ten years old. She has appeared on stage at gigs and festivals accompanying acts including Spiderbait, Bernard Fanning, Jimmy Buffett and Taylor Hawkins' side-project, Chevy Metal.

Gilmore is nicknamed 'Happy Gilmore', due to her easy going and cheerful persona.

Gilmore has stated Cathy Freeman, Susie O'Neill, Layne Beachley and Kelly Slater, as being among her sporting inspirations. She wears the number 88 on the back of her jersey, choosing the number as she "was born in 1988".

== Statistics ==
=== Victories ===
WSL World Tour Wins Source
Year	Event	Venue	Country	Notes
2005	Roxy Pro Gold Coast	Gold Coast, Queensland	Australia	Wildcard competitor
2006	Havaianas Beachley Classic	Manly Beach, Sydney, NSW	Australia	Wildcard competitor
2007	Rip Curl Women's Pro	Bells Beach, Victoria	Australia	
2007	NAB Beachley Classic	Manly Beach, Sydney, NSW	Australia	
2007	Mancora Peru Classic	Máncora	Peru	
2007	Billabong Pro	Honolua Bay	United States	
2008	Rip Curl Women's Pro	Bells Beach, Victoria	Australia	
2008	Rip Curl Pro Mademoiselle	Hossegor	France	
2008	Movistar Classic	Máncora	Peru	
2008	Roxy Pro	Sunset Beach	United States	
2008	Billabong Pro	Honolua Bay	United States	
2009	Roxy Pro Gold Coast	Gold Coast, Queensland	Australia	
2009	Billabong Pro	Sunset Beach	United States	
2010	Roxy Pro Gold Coast	Gold Coast, Queensland	Australia	
2010	Rip Curl Women's Pro	Bells Beach, Victoria	Australia	
2010	Commonwealth Bank Beachley Classic	Dee Why, New South Wales	Australia	
2010	Rip Curl Search	Isabela, Puerto Rico	Puerto Rico	
2011	Roxy Pro France	Biarritz	France	
2012	Roxy Pro Gold Coast	Gold Coast, Queensland	Australia	
2012	TSB Bank NZ Surf Festival	Taranaki	New Zealand	
2012	Roxy Pro France	Biarritz	France	
2014	Roxy Pro Gold Coast	Gold Coast, Queensland	Australia	
2014	Swatch Women's Pro Trestles	Trestles	United States	
2014	Cascais Women's Pro	Cascais	Portugal	
2017	Roxy Pro Gold Coast	Gold Coast, Queensland	Australia	
2017	Maui Women's Pro	Honolua Bay	United States	
2018	Rip Curl Women's Pro	Bells Beach, Victoria	Australia	
2018	Rio Pro	Rio de Janeiro	Brazil	
2018	Corona Open J-Bay	Jeffreys Bay	South Africa	
2019	Corona Bali Protected	Keramas, Bali	Indonesia	
2019	lululemon Maui Pro	Honolua Bay	United States	
2021	Corona Open Mexico	Barra De la Cruz	Mexico	
2022	Surf City El Salvador Pro	Punta Roca	El Salvador	
2022	WSL Finals	Lower Trestles	United States	
2026	Bonsoy Gold Coast Pro	Gold Coast, Queensland	Australia	

=== WSL Women's Championship Tour: 2010-2017 ===
Tournament	2010	2011	2012	2013	2014	2015	2016	2017
Roxy Pro Gold Coast	1st	5th	1st	3rd	1st	2nd	5th	1st
Rip Curl Pro	1st	3rd	2nd	5th	3rd	2nd	5th	2nd
Margaret River Pro	—N/a	—N/a	—N/a	3rd	3rd	9th	5th	3rd
Rio Pro	—N/a	3rd	5th	INJ	13th	INJ	5th	5th
Fiji Pro	—N/a	—N/a	—N/a	—N/a	2nd	INJ	9th	9th
US Open of Surfing	—N/a	5th	9th	9th	2nd	INJ	5th	13th
Swatch Women's Pro at Trestles	—N/a	—N/a	—N/a	—N/a	1st	INJ	2nd	5th
Cascais Women's Pro	—N/a	—N/a	—N/a	9th	5th	INJ	INJ	13th
Roxy Pro France	—N/a	1st	1st	5th	1st	9th	5th	5th
Maui Women's Pro	—N/a	—N/a	—N/a	—N/a	—N/a	INJ	9th	1st
TSB Bank Women's Surf Festival	9th	9th	1st	3rd	—N/a	—N/a	—N/a	—N/a
Beachley Classic	1st	3rd	5th	—N/a	—N/a	—N/a	—N/a	—N/a
Movistar Peru Classic	3rd	—N/a	—N/a	—N/a	—N/a	—N/a	—N/a	—N/a
Rip Curl Pro Portugal	2nd	—N/a	—N/a	—N/a	—N/a	—N/a	—N/a	—N/a
Rip Curl Search	1st	—N/a	—N/a	—N/a	—N/a	—N/a	—N/a	—N/a
O'Neill Women's World Cup	3rd	—N/a	—N/a	—N/a	—N/a	—N/a	—N/a	—N/a
Rank	1st	3rd	1st	5th	1st	12th	6th	2nd

Awards and achievements
Preceded by (Australia) Layne Beachley (Hawaii) Carissa Moore (Hawaii) Carissa Moore (Australia) Tyler Wright (Hawaii) Carissa Moore	World Surf League women's champion 2007–2010; 2012; 2014; 2018; 2022	Succeeded by (Hawaii) Carissa Moore (Hawaii) Carissa Moore (Hawaii) Carissa Moore (Hawaii) Carissa Moore (United States) Caroline Marks
