= 2007 ASP World Tour =

Professional surfing league season

The 2007 ASP World Tour is a professional competitive surfing league. It is run by the Association of Surfing Professionals.

== Men's World Tour ==
=== Tournaments ===
Date	Location	Country	Event	Winner	Runner-up	Ref
February 27-March 11	Gold Coast	Australia	Quiksilver Pro	Mick Fanning (AUS)	Bede Durbidge (AUS)	Report
April 3-April 13	Bells Beach	Australia	Rip Curl Pro	Taj Burrow (AUS)	Andy Irons (HAW)	Report
May 4-May 14	Teahupoo, Tahiti	French Polynesia	Billabong Pro	Damien Hobgood (USA)	Mick Fanning (AUS)	Report
June 20-July 1	Arica	Chile	Rip Curl Search	Andy Irons (HAW)	Damien Hobgood (USA)	Report
July 11-July 22	Jeffreys Bay	South Africa	Billabong Pro	Taj Burrow (AUS)	Kelly Slater (USA)	Report
September 9-September 15	Trestles	United States	Boost Mobile Pro	Kelly Slater (USA)	Pancho Sullivan (HAW)	Report
September 20-September 30	Hossegor	France	Quiksilver Pro	Mick Fanning (AUS)	Greg Emslie (RSA)	Report
October 1-October 14	Mundaka	Spain	Billabong Pro	Bobby Martinez (USA)	Taj Burrow (AUS)	Report
October 30-November 7	Santa Catarina	Brazil	Hang Loose Pro	Mick Fanning (AUS)	Kai Otton (AUS)	Report
December 8-December 20	Pipeline, Hawaii	United States	Billabong Pipeline Masters	Bede Durbidge (AUS)	Dean Morrison (AUS)	Report

=== Final standings ===
Rank	Name	Country	Points
1	Mick Fanning	Australia	8,136
2	Taj Burrow	Australia	7,105
3	Kelly Slater	United States	6,516
4	Joel Parkinson	Australia	6,432
5	Bede Durbidge	Australia	5,774
6	Andy Irons	Hawaii	5,151
7	Pancho Sullivan	Hawaii	4,938
8	Jeremy Flores	France	4,770
9	Dean Morrison	Australia	4,690
10	Bobby Martinez	United States	4,582
11	C.J. Hobgood	United States	4,580
12	Kai Otton	Australia	4,563
13	Tom Whitaker	Australia	4,493
14	Taylor Knox	United States	4,309
15	Damien Hobgood	United States	4,274
16	Luke Stedman	Australia	4,177
17	Chris Ward	United States	3,987
18	Mick Campbell	Australia	3,987
19	Adrian Buchan	Australia	3,982
19	Rodrigo Dornelles	Brazil	3,982

== Women's World Tour ==
=== Tournaments ===
Date	Location	Country	Event	Winner	Runner-up	Ref
February 27-March 11	Gold Coast	Australia	Roxy Pro Gold Coast	Chelsea Hedges (AUS)	Carissa Moore* (HAW)	Report
April 3-April 8	Bells Beach	Australia	Rip Curl Women's Pro	Stephanie Gilmore (AUS)	Sofía Mulánovich (PER)	Report
August 20-August 27	Itacaré	Brazil	Billabong Girls Pro	Samantha Cornish (AUS)	Silvana Lima (BRA)	Report
September 4-September 9	Santander	Spain	Rip Curl Girls Festival	Sofía Mulánovich (PER)	Silvana Lima (BRA)	Report
October 9-October 14	Manly Beach	Australia	NAB Beachley Classic	Stephanie Gilmore (AUS)	Silvana Lima (BRA)	Report
October 30-November 4	Máncora	Peru	Mancora Peru Classic	Stephanie Gilmore (AUS)	Layne Beachley (AUS)	Report
November 23-December 6	Sunset Beach, Hawaii	United States	Roxy Pro	Sofía Mulánovich (PER)	Amee Donohoe (AUS)	Report
December 8-December 20	Honolua Bay Hawaii	United States	Billabong Pro	Stephanie Gilmore (AUS)	Jessi Miley-Dyer (AUS)	Report

(*) denotes wildcard surfer

=== Final standings ===
Rank	Name	Country	Points
1	Stephanie Gilmore	Australia	6,708
2	Sofía Mulánovich	Peru	5,947
3	Silvana Lima	Brazil	5,342
4	Samantha Cornish	Australia	4,620
5	Layne Beachley	Australia	4,610
6	Amee Donohoe	Australia	4,406
7	Chelsea Hedges	Australia	4,238
8	Jessi Miley-Dyer	Australia	4,165
9	Rebecca Woods	Australia	3,582
10	Melanie Bartels	Hawaii	3,168
