= Beachley Classic =

Australian surfing competition

Beachley Classic is an event on the ASP World Surfing Tour. The event is held every year at Manly Beach or Dee Why in Sydney and has the richest prize money in Women's surfing.

== Results ==
Year	Winner	Nation	Score	Runner-Up	Nation	Score	Prize money
2006	Stephanie Gilmore	Australia		Layne Beachley	Australia		
2007	Stephanie Gilmore	Australia		Silvana Lima	Brazil		
2008	Tyler Wright	Australia		Silvana Lima	Brazil		
2009	Silvana Lima	Brazil		Stephanie Gilmore	Australia		
2010	Stephanie Gilmore	Australia		Sally Fitzgibbons	Australia		
2011	Carissa Moore	United States		Sofia Mulanovich	Peru		$140,000
2012	Courtney Conlogue	United States		Malia Manuel	United States		$130,000

== See also ==
- Layne Beachley
- Women's surfing in Australia
