= 2009 ASP World Tour =

Professional surfing league season

The 2009 ASP World Tour is a professional competitive surfing league run by the Association of Surfing Professionals. Men and Women compete in separate tours with Events taking place from late February to mid-December, at various surfing locations around the world.

Surfers receive points for their best events. The surfer with the most points at the end of the tour is announced the 2009 ASP surfing world champion.

== Men's World Tour ==
=== Tournaments ===
Date	Location	Country	Event	Winner	Runner-up	Ref
February 28-March 11	Gold Coast	Australia	Quiksilver Pro	Joel Parkinson (AUS)	Adriano De Souza (BRA)	Report
April 7-April 19	Bells Beach	Australia	Rip Curl Pro	Joel Parkinson (AUS)	Adam Robertson* (AUS)	Report
May 9-May 20	Teahupoo, Tahiti	French Polynesia	Billabong Pro Teahupoo	Bobby Martinez (USA)	Taj Burrow (AUS)	Report
June 27-July 5	Santa Catarina	Brazil	Hang Loose Santa Catarina Pro	Kelly Slater (USA)	Adriano De Souza (BRA)	Report
July 9-July 19	Jeffreys Bay	South Africa	Billabong Pro	Joel Parkinson (AUS)	Damien Hobgood (USA)	Report
September 11-September 20	Trestles	United States	Hurley Pro	Mick Fanning (AUS)	Dane Reynolds (USA)	Report
September 23-October 4	Hossegor	France	Quiksilver Pro France	Mick Fanning (AUS)	Bede Durbidge (AUS)	Report
October 5-October 17	Mundaka	Spain	Billabong Pro Mundaka	Adriano De Souza (BRA)	Chris Davidson (AUS)	Report
October 19-October 28	Peniche	Portugal	Rip Curl Search	Mick Fanning (AUS)	Bede Durbidge (AUS)	Report
December 8-December 20	Pipeline, Hawaii	United States	Billabong Pipeline Masters	Taj Burrow (AUS)	Kelly Slater (USA)	Report

(*) denotes wildcard surfer

=== Final standings ===
Rank	Name	Country	Points
1	Mick Fanning	Australia	7,140
2	Joel Parkinson	Australia	6,772
3	Bede Durbidge	Australia	6,468
4	Taj Burrow	Australia	6,314
5	Adriano De Souza	Brazil	6,148
6	Kelly Slater	United States	6,136
7	C.J. Hobgood	United States	5,880
8	Bobby Martinez	United States	5,606
9	Damien Hobgood	United States	5,438
10	Dane Reynolds	United States	5,219

== Women's World Tour ==
=== Tournaments ===
Date	Location	Country	Event	Winner	Runner-up	Ref
February 28-March 11	Gold Coast	Australia	Roxy Pro Gold Coast	Stephanie Gilmore (AUS)	Melanie Bartels (HAW)	Report
April 8-April 13	Bells Beach	Australia	Rip Curl Women's Pro	Silvana Lima (BRA)	Stephanie Gilmore (AUS)	Report
October 14-October 19	Dee Why	Australia	Commonwealth Bank Beachley Classic	Silvana Lima (BRA)	Stephanie Gilmore (AUS)	Report
October 26-October 30	Peniche	Portugal	Rip Curl Search	Coco Ho (HAW)	Chelsea Hedges (AUS)	Report
November 3-November 8	Lobitos	Peru	Movistar Peru Classic Presented By Rip Curl	Sofía Mulánovich (PER)	Stephanie Gilmore (AUS)	Report
November 25-December 6	Sunset Beach, Hawaii	United States	Gidget Pro	Carissa Moore* (HAW)	Sally Fitzgibbons (AUS)	Report
December 8-December 20	Honolua Bay, Hawaii	United States	Billabong Pro	Stephanie Gilmore (AUS)	Sofía Mulánovich (PER)	Report

(*) denotes wildcard surfer

=== Final standings ===
Rank	Name	Country	Points
1	Stephanie Gilmore	Australia	6,169
2	Silvana Lima	Brazil	4,944
3	Sofía Mulánovich	Peru	4,863
4	Coco Ho	Hawaii	4,309
5	Sally Fitzgibbons	Australia	4,188
6	Melanie Bartels	Hawaii	3,705
7	Chelsea Hedges	Australia	3,595
8	Paige Hareb	New Zealand	2,976
9	Rebecca Woods	Australia	2,803
10	Rosy Hodge	South Africa	2,784
