= 2014 ASP World Tour =

Professional surfing league season

2014 World Surf League
- Location: International
- Dates: late February to mid-December 2015

Champions
- Men: (Brazil) Gabriel Medina
- Women: (Australia) Stephanie Gilmore

The 2014 ASP World Tour was a professional surfing league competition run by the Association of Surfing Professionals. Men and women compete in separate tours with events taking place from late February to mid-December, at various surfing locations around the world. Surfers receive points for their best events. The surfer with the most points at the end of the tour is announced the 2014 ASP Surfing World Champion.

== 2014 Men's ASP World Championship Tour (WCT) ==
=== Event results ===
| Round | Event | Men's champion | Men's runner-up |
|---|---|---|---|
| 1 | (Australia) Quiksilver Pro Gold Coast | (Brazil) Gabriel Medina | (Australia) Joel Parkinson |
| 2 | (Australia) Drug Aware Margaret River Pro | (French Polynesia) Michel Bourez | (Australia) Josh Kerr |
| 3 | (Australia) Rip Curl Pro Bells Beach | (Australia) Mick Fanning | (Australia) Taj Burrow |
| 4 | (Brazil) Billabong Rio Pro | (French Polynesia) Michel Bourez | (United States) Kolohe Andino |
| 5 | Fiji Pro | (Brazil) Gabriel Medina | (United States) Nat Young |
| 6 | (South Africa) J-Bay Open | (Australia) Mick Fanning | (Australia) Joel Parkinson |
| 7 | (French Polynesia) Billabong Pro Tahiti | (Brazil) Gabriel Medina | (United States) Kelly Slater |
| 8 | (United States) Hurley Pro at Trestles | (South Africa) Jordy Smith | (Hawaii) John John Florence |
| 9 | Quiksilver Pro France | (Hawaii) John John Florence | (Brazil) Jadson André |
| 10 | Moche Rip Curl Pro Portugal | (Australia) Mick Fanning | (South Africa) Jordy Smith |
| 11 | (Hawaii) Billabong Pipe Masters | (Australia) Julian Wilson | (Brazil) Gabriel Medina |

=== Men's Rankings ===
Points are awarded using the following structure:

| Position | 1st | 2nd | 3rd | 5th | 9th | 13th | 25th | INJ |
| Points | 10,000 | 8,000 | 6,500 | 5,200 | 4,000 | 1,750 | 500 | 500 |

| Ranking | Surfer | WCT 1 (Details) | WCT 2 (Details) | WCT 3 (Details) | WCT 4 (Details) | WCT 5 (Details) | WCT 6 (Details) | WCT 7 (Details) | WCT 8 (Details) | WCT 9 (Details) | WCT 10 (Details) | WCT 11 (Details) | Points | Prize money |
|---|---|---|---|---|---|---|---|---|---|---|---|---|---|---|
| 1 | Gabriel Medina (BRA) | 1st | 5th | 9th | 13th | 1st | 5th | 1st | 5th | 5th | 13th | 2nd | 62,800 | $431,500 |
| 2 | Mick Fanning (AUS) | 5th | 13th | 1st | 25th | 5th | 1st | 13th | 5th | 9th | 1st | 9th | 55,350 | $397,000 |
| 3 | John John Florence (HAW) | 25th | 13th | 3rd | 13th | 5th | 13th | 3rd | 2nd | 1st | 3rd | 5th | 51,400 | $266,500 |
| 4 | Kelly Slater (USA) | 5th | 3rd | 5th | 3rd | 5th | 13th | 2nd | 3rd | 5th | 13th | 13th | 50,050 | $188,500 |
| 5 | Michel Bourez (PYF) | 13th | 1st | 25th | 1st | 3rd | 13th | 9th | 9th | 13th | 9th | 9th | 46,000 | $306,500 |
| 6 | Joel Parkinson (AUS) | 2nd | 5th | 5th | 9th | 9th | 2nd | 13th | 5th | 13th | 13th | 13th | 43,100 | $188,000 |
| 7 | Jordy Smith (ZAF) | 25th | 5th | 9th | 5th | 13th | 13th | 25th | 1st | 3rd | 2nd | 25th | 42,900 | $245,500 |
| 8 | Adriano De Souza (BRA) | 3rd | 9th | 5th | 9th | 5th | 5th | 25th | 5th | 13th | 5th | INJ | 42,250 | $137,500 |
| 9 | Taj Burrow (AUS) | 3rd | 13th | 2nd | 3rd | 9th | 5th | 13th | 9th | 9th | 13th | INJ | 41,700 | $161,000 |
| 9 | Josh Kerr (AUS) | 9th | 2nd | 13th | 9th | 25th | 9th | 13th | 25th | 3rd | 5th | 3rd | 41,700 | $167,500 |
| 11 | Kolohe Andino (USA) | 13th | 13th | 25th | 2nd | 3rd | 9th | 5th | 13th | 5th | 13th | 13th | 35,900 | $158,000 |
| 12 | Owen Wright (AUS) | 13th | 13th | 5th | 25th | 9th | 3rd | 5th | 9th | 13th | 13th | 9th | 34,150 | $133,500 |
| 13 | Nat Young (USA) | 9th | 5th | 13th | 5th | 2nd | 13th | 13th | 13th | 25th | 25th | 13th | 31,150 | $146,000 |
| 14 | Julian Wilson (AUS) | 13th | 13th | 3rd | 13th | 13th | 13th | 25th | 13th | 13th | 25th | 1st | 28,750 | $202,500 |
| 15 | Adrian Buchan (AUS) | 13th | 13th | 25th | 13th | 13th | 13th | 5th | 3rd | 13th | 25th | 3rd | 28,700 | $128,000 |
| 16 | Bede Durbidge (AUS) | 25th | 3rd | 13th | 5th | 13th | 25th | 3rd | 25th | 25th | 9th | 13th | 28,450 | $128,000 |
| 17 | Filipe Toledo (BRA) | 25th | 9th | 13th | 13th | 9th | 25th | INJ | 13th | 9th | 5th | 5th | 28,150 | $112,000 |
| 18 | Kai Otton (AUS) | 25th | 13th | 13th | INJ | 13th | 13th | 9th | 13th | 13th | 3rd | 5th | 26,200 | $112,500 |
| 19 | Miguel Pupo (BRA) | 5th | 9th | 13th | 25th | 13th | 25th | 25th | 9th | 5th | 13th | 13th | 25,900 | $117,000 |
| 20 | Sebastian Zietz (HAW) | 25th | 13th | 13th | 5th | 13th | 13th | 13th | 25th | 13th | 13th | 9th | 21,450 | $110,000 |
| 21 | Freddy Patacchia Jr. (HAW) | 9th | 25th | 9th | 25th | 13th | 9th | 25th | 13th | 13th | 13th | 13th | 21,250 | $109,000 |
| 22 | Jadson André (BRA) | 13th | 13th | 25th | 13th | 25th | 25th | 13th | 13th | 2nd | 13th | 13th | 20,750 | $130,500 |
| 23 | Matt Wilkinson (AUS) | 25th | 25th | 13th | 25th | 25th | 3rd | 13th | 25th | 9th | 25th | 13th | 17,750 | |
| 24 | C.J. Hobgood (USA) | 5th | 13th | 13th | 25th | 25th | 9th | 13th | 13th | 25th | 25th | INJ | 17,700 | |
| 24 | Adam Melling (AUS) | 13th | 13th | 9th | 25th | INJ | 13th | 25th | 25th | 25th | 5th | 13th | 17,700 | |
| 26 | Alejo Muniz (BRA) | 25th | INJ | INJ | 13th | 13th | 5th | 25th | 25th | 25th | 13th | 5th | 17,650 | |
| 27 | Aritz Aranburu (SPA) | 25th | 25th | 13th | 13th | 25th | 13th | 13th | 13th | 25th | 9th | 25th | 14,250 | |
| 28 | Dion Atkinson (AUS) | 13th | 25th | 25th | 13th | 25th | 25th | 5th | 25th | 13th | 13th | 25th | 14,200 | |
| 29 | Tiago Pires (POR) | 13th | INJ | 25th | 13th | 13th | 25th | 9th | 13th | 25th | 25th | 25th | 13,000 | |
| 30 | Mitch Crews (AUS) | 9th | 25th | 13th | 13th | 25th | 25th | 13th | 25th | 25th | 25th | 25th | 11,750 | |
| 31 | Brett Simpson (USA) | 25th | 25th | 25th | 25th | 25th | 25th | 9th | 25th | 25th | 9th | 25th | 11,500 | |
| 32 | Travis Logie (ZAF) | 13th | 25th | 25th | 9th | 25th | 25th | 25th | 25th | 13th | 25th | 25th | 10,500 | |
| 33 | Jeremy Flores (FRA) | 13th | 25th | 25th | 25th | 13th | 25th | – | 25th | 13th | 25th | 13th | 9,500 | |
| 34 | Glenn Hall (IRL) | – | – | 13th | 25th | 13th | 25th | 25th | – | – | – | 25th | 5,500 | |
| 35 | Raoni Monteiro (BRA) | 25th | 25th | 25th | 25th | INJ | 25th | 25th | 25th | 25th | 25th | 25th | 4,500 | |
| 36 | Mitch Coleborn (AUS) | – | 25th | – | – | 13th | – | 25th | – | – | – | 25th | 3,250 | |

== 2014 Women's ASP World Championship Tour (WCT) ==
=== Event results ===
| Round | Event | Men's champion | Men's runner-up |
|---|---|---|---|
| 1 | (Australia) Roxy Pro Gold Coast | (Australia) Stephanie Gilmore | (South Africa) Bianca Buitendag |
| 2 | (Australia) Drug Aware Margaret River Pro | (Hawaii) Carissa Moore | (Australia) Tyler Wright |
| 3 | (Australia) Rip Curl Women's Pro Bells Beach | (Hawaii) Carissa Moore | (Australia) Tyler Wright |
| 4 | (Brazil) Rio Women's Pro | (Australia) Sally Fitzgibbons | (Hawaii) Carissa Moore |
| 5 | Fiji Women's Pro | (Australia) Sally Fitzgibbons | (Australia) Stephanie Gilmore |
| 6 | (United States) Vans US Open of Surfing | (Australia) Tyler Wright | (Australia) Stephanie Gilmore |
| 7 | (United States) Swatch Women's Pro Trestles | (Australia) Stephanie Gilmore | (Australia) Sally Fitzgibbons |
| 8 | Roxy Pro France | (Australia) Tyler Wright | (United States) Courtney Conlogue |
| 9 | (Portugal) Cascais Women's Pro | (Australia) Stephanie Gilmore | (Australia) Sally Fitzgibbons |
| 10 | (Hawaii) Target Maui Pro | (Hawaii) Carissa Moore | (Australia) Tyler Wright |

=== 2014 Women's Rankings ===
| Ranking | Surfer | WCT 1 | WCT 2 | WCT 3 | WCT 4 | WCT 5 | WCT 6 | WCT 7 | WCT 8 | WCT 9 | WCT 10 | Points | Prize money |
|---|---|---|---|---|---|---|---|---|---|---|---|---|---|
| 1 | Stephanie Gilmore (AUS) | 1st | 3rd | 3rd | 13th | 2nd | 2nd | 1st | 5th | 1st | 5th | 64,200 | $292,500 |
| 2 | Tyler Wright (AUS) | 5th | 2nd | 2nd | 3rd | 9th | 1st | 5th | 1st | 3rd | 2nd | 62,200 | $259,000 |
| 3 | Carissa Moore (HAW) | 3rd | 1st | 1st | 2nd | 5th | 5th | 9th | 3rd | 5th | 1st | 61,400 | $281,250 |
| 4 | Sally Fitzgibbons (AUS) | 5th | 3rd | 3rd | 1st | 1st | 3rd | 2nd | 5th | 2nd | 5th | 60,700 | $251,750 |
| 5 | Malia Manuel (HAW) | 5th | 5th | 5th | 9th | 3rd | 3rd | 13th | 5th | 3rd | 9th | 43,600 | $121,000 |
| 6 | Lakey Peterson (USA) | 3rd | 13th | 5th | 3rd | 13th | 5th | 5th | 9th | 5th | 5th | 42,300 | $116,750 |
| 7 | Bianca Buitendag (ZAF) | 2nd | 5th | 9th | 13th | 5th | 13th | 5th | 5th | 13th | 3rd | 40,350 | $122,500 |
| 8 | Johanne Defay (FRA) | 13th | 9th | 13th | 13th | 5th | 5th | 3rd | 3rd | 5th | 5th | 38,850 | $112,500 |
| 9 | Courtney Conlogue (USA) | 5th | 5th | 9th | INJ | INJ | INJ | 13th | 2nd | 5th | 3rd | 36,900 | $94,250 |
| 10 | Laura Enever (AUS) | 13th | 5th | 9th | 9th | 5th | 9th | 5th | 13th | 9th | 9th | 32,100 | $100,250 |
| 11 | Dimity Stoyle (AUS) | 9th | 9th | 5th | 13th | 3rd | 9th | 9th | 9th | 13th | 9th | 31,500 | $100,250 |
| 12 | Coco Ho (HAW) | 13th | 9th | 5th | 5th | 13th | 13th | 3rd | 13th | 13th | 9th | 28,750 | $98,500 |
| 13 | Nikki Van Dijk (AUS) | 13th | 13th | 9th | 5th | 13th | 5th | 13th | 9th | 9th | 13th | 25,550 | $93,000 |
| 14 | Pauline Ado (FRA) | 9th | 13th | 13th | 5th | 13th | 13th | 9th | 9th | 9th | 13th | 23,650 | $90,250 |
| 15 | Alessa Quizon (HAW) | 9th | 13th | 13th | 5th | 9th | 13th | 9th | 13th | 13th | 13th | 22,100 | $88,750 |
| 16 | Paige Hareb (NZL) | 9th | 9th | 13th | 13th | 9th | 9th | 13th | 13th | 9th | 13th | 21,750 | $88,750 |
| 17 | Alana Blanchard (HAW) | 13th | 13th | 13th | 13th | 13th | 13th | 13th | 13th | 13th | 13th | 14,000 | $80,000 |
| 18 | Tatiana Weston-Webb (HAW) | – | – | – | 9th | 9th | 9th | – | – | – | – | 9,900 | $28,500 |
