= Quiksilver Pro Gold Coast =

Surfing competition in Australia

- Current season, competition or edition: Quiksilver Pro Gold Coast 2026
- Sport: Surfing
- Country: Australia
- Most recent champion: Ethan Ewing (AUS)
- Most titles: Kelly Slater (USA) (6)

Quiksilver Pro Gold Coast was a surfing competition in the World Surf League that was held at Coolangatta in Queensland, Australia. In August 2021 it was announced that this event would be canceled, though it later returned as in 2025.

== Results ==
Year	Winner	Nation	Score	Runner-Up	Nation	Score	Prize money
2026	Ethan Ewing	Australia	14.56	Connor O'Leary	Japan	14.17	
2025	Filipe Toledo (2)	Brazil	17.60	Julian Wilson	Australia	17.20	
2019	Italo Ferreira	Brazil	12.57	Kolohe Andino	Hawaii	12.43	
2018	Julian Wilson	Australia	17.43	Adrian Buchan	Australia	15.10	
2017	Owen Wright	Australia	14.66	Matt Wilkinson	Australia	13.50	
2016	Matt Wilkinson	Australia	14.20	Kolohe Andino	United States	13.66	
2015	Filipe Toledo	Brazil	19.60	Julian Wilson	Australia	14.70	
2014	Gabriel Medina	Brazil	16.33	Joel Parkinson	Australia	16.27	
2013	Kelly Slater (6)	United States	18.56	Joel Parkinson	Australia	17.47	$450,000
2012	Taj Burrow (2)	Australia	15.86	Adriano De Souza	Brazil	15.60	$425,000
2011	Kelly Slater (5)	United States	11.20	Taj Burrow	Australia	10.17	$425,000
2010	Taj Burrow	Australia	15.57	Jordy Smith	South Africa	12.56	$400,000
2009	Joel Parkinson (2)	Australia	18.83	Adriano De Souza	Brazil	11.30	$340,000
2008	Kelly Slater (4)	United States	17.94	Mick Fanning	Australia	15.23	$325,000
2007	Mick Fanning (2)	Australia	16.17	Bede Durbidge	Australia	12.00	$300,000
2006	Kelly Slater (3)	United States	16.17	Taj Burrow	Australia	14.60	$280,000
2005	Mick Fanning	Australia	16.97	Chris Ward	United States	11.90	$270,000
2004	Michael Lowe	Australia	17.34	Andy Irons	Hawaii	14.16	$260,000
2003	Dean Morrison	Australia	18.96	Mark Occhilupo	Australia	12.84	
2002	Joel Parkinson	Australia	25.35	Cory Lopez	United States	23.10	
2000	Sunny Garcia	Hawaii	24.70	Jake Paterson	Australia	18.55	
1999	Beau Emerton	Australia	23.40	Nathan Webster	Australia	22.60	
1998	Kelly Slater (2)	United States	31.45	Pat O'Connell	United States	30.60	
1997	Kelly Slater	United States	35.80	Peterson Rosa	Brazil	27.45	
1996	Kaipo Jaquias	Hawaii	21.75	Jeff Booth	United States	21.65	
1989	Mark Sainsbury	Australia	80.00	Damien Hardman	Australia	79.30	
1988	Barton Lynch	Australia		Derek Ho	Hawaii		
1986	Damien Hardman	Australia		Tom Carroll	Australia		
1985	Tom Curren (2)	United States		Barton Lynch	Australia		
1984	Tom Curren	United States		Mike Parsons	United States		
1983	Tom Carroll	Australia		Wayne Bartholomew	Australia		
1982	Cheyne Horan	Australia		Mark Richards	Australia		
1981	Mark Richards (2)	Australia		Dane Kealoha	Hawaii		
1980	Peter Harris	Australia		Dane Kealoha	Hawaii		
1979	Mark Richards	Australia		Cheyne Horan	Australia		
1978	Wayne Bartholomew	Australia		Michael Ho	Hawaii		
1977	Michael Peterson	Australia		Mark Richards	Australia		

== See also ==
- Roxy Pro Gold Coast
- Quiksilver Pro France
- Quiksilver
- Roxy
