= Quiksilver Pro France =

World Surf League men's France stage

- Current season, competition or edition: 2024 World Surf League
- Sport: Surfing
- Country: France
- Most recent champion: Connor O'Leary (2021)
- Most titles: Mick Fanning (4)
- Website: WSL Quiksilver Pro France

The Quiksilver Pro France is a men's surfing event on the World Surf League (WSL) Championship Tour. The event is part of the yearly world tour (Quiksilver Pro since 2002), and takes place in Landes de Gascogne in the Landes department in the Nouvelle-Aquitaine area of South-West France, Atlantic Europe.

The event isn't yearly because of wave conditions, but it is scheduled for the end of September and at the beginning of October.

== Winners ==
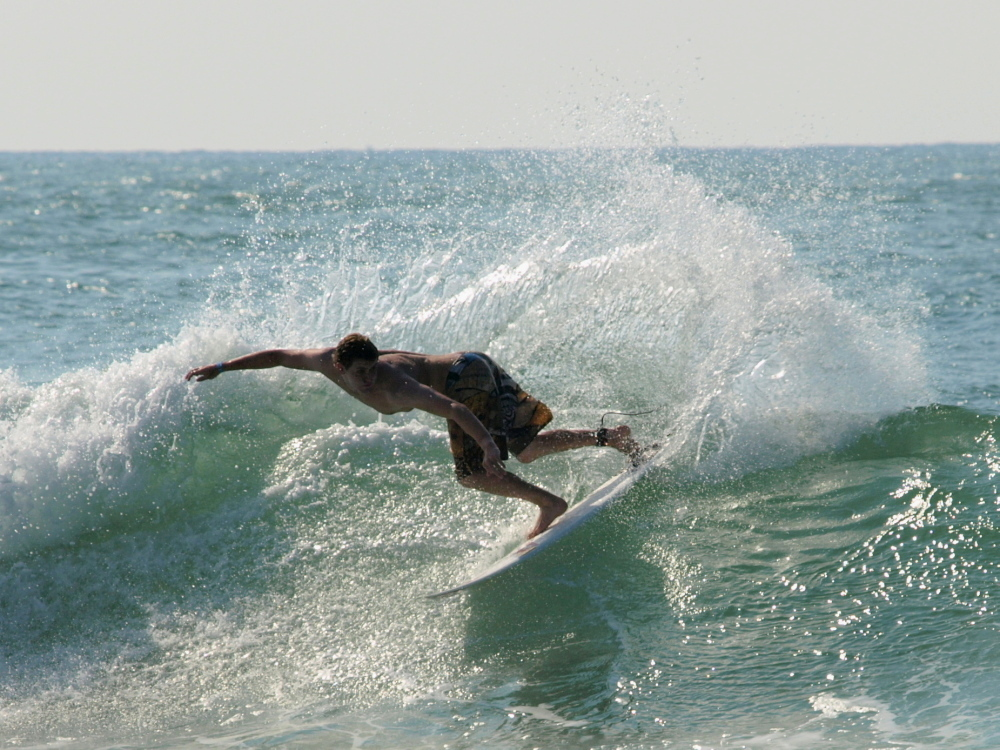
Quiksilver Pro France at Hossegor

Since 1987, the Men's Quiksilver Pro France, which is part of the World Surf League has taken place in one of the towns of Seignosse, Capbreton, and Hossegor near the city of Biarritz on the coastal region (Landes forest) of Landes, France, but, not yearly due to surf conditions. The competition was also canceled in 2020 due to the COVID-19 pandemic.

| Year | Men's Winner |
|---|---|
| 2021 | Connor O'Leary (JPN) |
| 2019 | Jeremy Flores (FRA) |
| 2018 | Julian Wilson (AUS) |
| 2017 | Gabriel Medina (BRA) |
| 2016 | Keanu Asing (HAW) |
| 2015 | Gabriel Medina (BRA) |
| 2014 | John John Florence (HAW) |
| 2013 | Mick Fanning (AUS) |
| 2012 | Kelly Slater (USA) |
| 2011 | Gabriel Medina (BRA) |
| 2010 | Mick Fanning (AUS) |
| 2009 | Mick Fanning (AUS) |
| 2008 | Adrian Buchan (AUS) |
| 2007 | Mick Fanning (AUS) |
| 2006 | Joel Parkinson (AUS) |
| 2005 | Andy Irons (HAW) |
| 2004 | Andy Irons (HAW) |
| 2003 | Andy Irons (HAW) |
| 2002 | Neco Padaratz (BRA) |
| 2000 | C. J. Hobgood (USA) |
| 1999 | Michael Lowe (AUS) |
| 1998 | Damien Hardman (AUS) |
| 1997 | Rob Machado (USA) |
| 1996 | Kelly Slater (USA) |
| 1995 | Rob Machado (USA) |
| 1994 | Flavio Padaratz (BRA) |
| 1993 | Damien Hardman (AUS) |
| 1992 | Kelly Slater (USA) |
| 1991 | Tom Carroll (surfer) (AUS) |
| 1990 | Martin Potter (surfer) (UK) |
| 1989 | Tom Curren (USA) |
| 1988 | Tom Carroll (surfer) (AUS) |
| 1987 | Dave Macaulay (AUS) |

=== Prize money ===
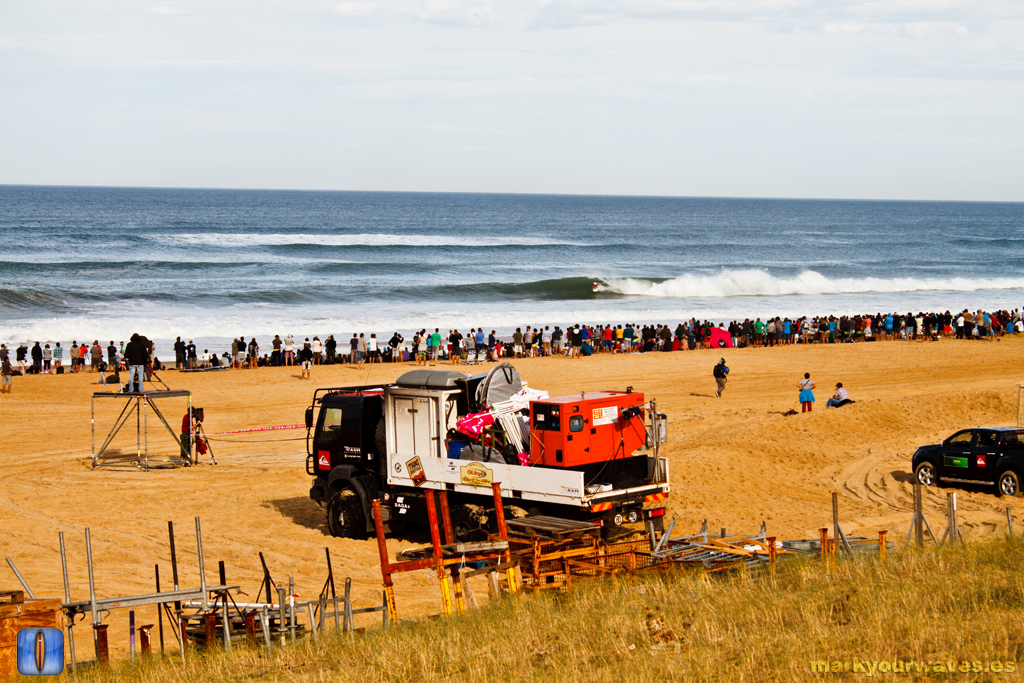
Hossegor Quiksilver surf competition 2013

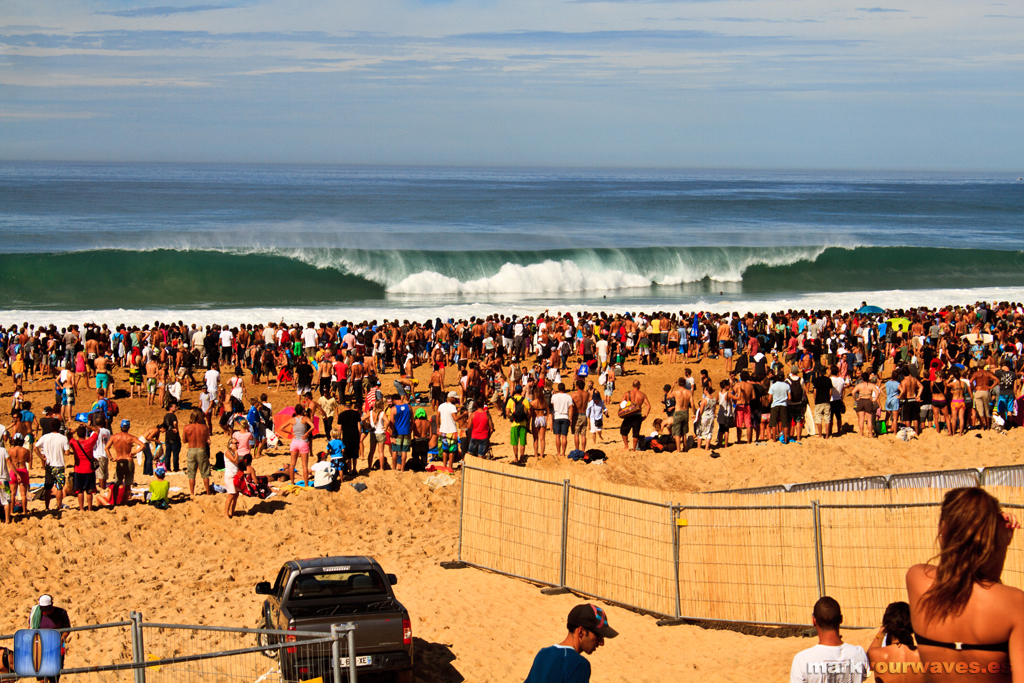
Hossegor beach during Quiksilver Pro France

Examples of the structure of the prize money which has varied over the years is that, in the 2018 edition, the totals for the competitors amounted to, $100,000 (USD) for the winner, $55,000 for second place, and $30,000 third place (2 competitors), $19,000 for 5th place (4 participants), $14,700 for 9th place (4 participants), $11,500 for 13th place (12 participants), and to $10,000 for 25th place (12 participants). And in 2021, the structure differed with more competitors; the winner received $20,000, second place received $10,000, and joint third place received $5,000, with the total gradually lowering to $600 for the last group of competitors who lost in the first round with 73rd being placed last.

== See also ==
- Quiksilver (business)
- Quiksilver Pro Gold Coast
- Roxy Pro Gold Coast
