= 2012 ASP World Tour =

Professional surfing league season

The 2012 ASP World Championship Tour was a professional competitive surfing league run by the Association of Surfing Professionals. Men and women competed in separate tours with events taking place from late February to mid-December, at various surfing locations around the world.

Surfers received points for their best events. The surfer with the most points at the end of the tour was announced the 2012 ASP World Tour Champion.

Joel Parkinson and Stephanie Gilmore were crowned the men's and women's champions, respectively.

== ASP World Championship Tour ==
=== Event schedule ===
Date	Location	Country	Event	Winner	Runner-up	Prize money	Report
February 25 – March 5	Gold Coast	Australia	Quiksilver Pro Gold Coast	Taj Burrow (AUS)	Adriano De Souza (BRA)	$425,000	Report
April 3–14	Bells Beach	Australia	Rip Curl Pro	Mick Fanning (AUS)	Kelly Slater (USA)	$425,000	Report
May 9–20	Rio de Janeiro	Brazil	Billabong Rio Pro	John John Florence (HAW)	Joel Parkinson (AUS)	$500,000	Report
June 3–16	Tavarua	Fiji	Volcom Pro Fiji	Kelly Slater (USA)	Gabriel Medina (BRA)	$425,000	Report
August 16–27	Teahupoo, Tahiti, French Polynesia	French Polynesia	Billabong Pro Teahupoo	Mick Fanning (AUS)	Joel Parkinson (AUS)	$425,000	Report
September 16–22	Trestles, California	United States	Hurley Pro	Kelly Slater (USA)	Joel Parkinson (AUS)	$425,000	Report
September 28 – October 8	Soorts-Hossegor	France	Quiksilver Pro France	Kelly Slater (USA)	Dane Reynolds (USA)	$425,000	Report
October 10–21	Supertubos beach, Peniche	Portugal	Rip Curl Pro Portugal	Julian Wilson (AUS)	Gabriel Medina (BRA)	$425,000	Report
November 2–12	Santa Cruz, California	United States	O'Neill Coldwater Classic Santa Cruz	Taj Burrow (AUS)	Matt Wilkinson (AUS)	$425,000	Report
December 8 – December 15	Banzai Pipeline, Hawaii	United States	Billabong Pipeline Masters	Joel Parkinson (AUS)	Josh Kerr (AUS)	$425,000	Report

=== Final standings ===
Rank	Name	Country	Points
1	Joel Parkinson	Australia	58,700
2	Kelly Slater	United States	55,450
3	Mick Fanning	Australia	47,000
4	John John Florence	Hawaii	44,350
5	Adriano De Souza	Brazil	42,350
6	Taj Burrow	Australia	41,900
7	Gabriel Medina	Brazil	41,350
8	Josh Kerr	Australia	38,900
9	Julian Wilson	Australia	35,900
10	Owen Wright	Australia	33,600
11	Jeremy Flores	France	33,600

== ASP Women’s World Championship Tour ==
=== Event schedule ===
Date	Location	Country	Event	Winner	Runner-up	Prize Money	Report
February 25 – March 5	Gold Coast	Australia	Roxy Pro Gold Coast	Stephanie Gilmore (AUS)	Laura Enever (AUS)	$110,000	Report
April 3–9	Bells Beach	Australia	Rip Curl Women's Pro	Sally Fitzgibbons (AUS)	Stephanie Gilmore (AUS)	$110,000	Report
April 11–15	Taranaki	New Zealand	Subaru Pro TSB Bank Women's Surf Festival	Stephanie Gilmore (AUS)	Carissa Moore (HAW)	$110,000	Report
April 18–23	Dee Why	Australia	Commonwealth Bank Beachley Classic	Courtney Conlogue (USA)	Malia Manuel (HAW)	$130,000	Report
May 9–20	Rio de Janeiro	Brazil	Billabong Rio Pro	Sally Fitzgibbons (AUS)	Coco Ho (HAW)	$110,000	Report
July 11 – July 17	Cote des Basques, Biarritz	France	Roxy Pro France	Stephanie Gilmore (AUS)	Tyler Wright (AUS)	$110,000	Report
July 30 – August 5	Huntington Beach	United States	U.S. Open of Surfing	Lakey Peterson (USA)	Carissa Moore (HAW)	$110,000	Report

=== Final standings ===
Rank	Name	Country	Points
1	Stephanie Gilmore	Australia	48,400
2	Sally Fitzgibbons	Australia	43,400
3	Carissa Moore	Hawaii	40,700
4	Tyler Wright	Australia	36,700
5	Courtney Conlogue	United States	36,000
6	Malia Manuel	Hawaii	34,100
7	Lakey Peterson	United States	33,700
8	Laura Enever	Australia	32,800
9	Coco Ho	Hawaii	31,850
10	Paige Hareb	New Zealand	25,450
