= Roxy Pro Gold Coast =

Australian surfing competition

- Current season, competition or edition: Roxy Pro Gold Coast 2019
- Sport: Surfing
- Country: Australia
- Most recent champion: Bettylou Sakura Johnson (HAW)
- Most titles: Stephanie Gilmore (AUS) (6)

Roxy Pro Gold Coast is a surfing competition on the World Surf League Championship Tour. The event is held every year at Coolangatta in Queensland, Australia.

== Naming ==
Since the birth of this competition it had different names.

== Results ==
Year	Winner	Nation	Score	Runner-Up	Nation	Score	Prize purse	Reference
2022	Caitlin Simmers	United States		Molly Picklum	Australia		$100,000	
2019	Caroline Marks	United States	13.83	Carissa Moore	Hawaii	11.67	$100,000	Results
2018	Lakey Peterson	United States	15.67	Keely Andrew	Australia	5.67	$65,000	Results
2017	Stephanie Gilmore (6)	Australia	16.60	Lakey Peterson	United States	12.66	$60,000	Results
2016	Tyler Wright (2)	Australia	14.67	Courtney Conlogue	United States	10.94		Results
2015	Carissa Moore (2)	Hawaii	18.43	Stephanie Gilmore	Australia	15.50		Results
2014	Stephanie Gilmore (5)	Australia	15.80	Bianca Buitendag	South Africa	10.47	$60,000	Results
2013	Tyler Wright	Australia	17.97	Sally Fitzgibbons	Australia	16.66	$120,000	Results
2012	Stephanie Gilmore (4)	Australia	16.37	Laura Enever	Australia	14.20	$110,000	Results
2011	Carissa Moore	Hawaii	15.34	Tyler Wright	Australia	14.37	$110,000	Results
2010	Stephanie Gilmore (3)	Australia	12.40	Melanie Bartels	United States	10.36		Results
2009	Stephanie Gilmore (2)	Australia	16.07	Melanie Bartels	United States	12.50		Results
2008	Sofía Mulánovich	Peru	17.34	Samantha Cornish	Australia	7.83		Results
2007	Chelsea Hedges	Australia		Carissa Moore	Hawaii			
2006	Melanie Redman-Carr	Australia		Layne Beachley	Australia			
2005	Stephanie Gilmore	Australia		Megan Abubo	United States			
2004	Jacqueline Silva	Brazil		Rochelle Ballard	United States			
2003	Layne Beachley (2)	Australia		Trudy Todd	Australia			
2002	Lynette MacKenzie (2)	Australia		Jacqueline Silva	Brazil			
2000	Layne Beachley	Australia						
1999	Serena Brooke	Australia						
1998	Trudy Todd	Australia						
1997	Rochelle Ballard	Hawaii						
1996	Lynette MacKenzie	Australia						
1989	Jodie Cooper	Australia						
1988	Frieda Zamba	United States						
1986	Wendy Botha (2)	Australia						
1985	Wendy Botha	Australia						
1984	Liz Benavidez	United States						
1978	Margo Oberg	United States						

== See also ==
- Quiksilver Pro Gold Coast
- Roxy Pro France
- Roxy
- Women's surfing in Australia
