= Taj Burrow =

Australian retired professional surfer

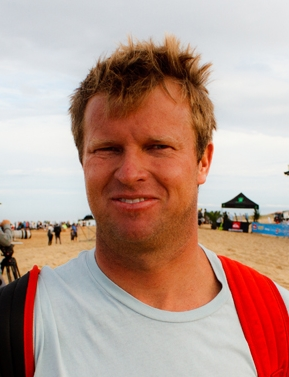
- Burrow at the 2013 Quiksilver Pro France in Hossegor

Personal information
- Born: 2 June 1978 (age 48) Busselton, Western Australia, Australia
- Height: 1.75 m (5 ft 9 in)
- Weight: 72 kg (159 lb)
- Website: tajburrow.com

Surfing career
- Sport: Surfing
- Best year: 1999 & 2007 – 2nd in ASP World Tour Ranking
- Career earnings: $10,925,033 AUD prize money
- Sponsors: Billabong, Lost Surfboards, Von Zipper, Globe, Futures Fins
- Major achievements: ASP World Tour Runner Up 1999, 2007 ASP Rookie of the Year 1998 Australian Male Surfer of the Year 1997

Surfing specifications
- Stance: Natural (regular foot)

Taj Burrow (born 2 June 1978) is an Australian retired professional surfer. Taj retired from the WSL World Tour in June 2016 where he left a legacy of power and impressive surfing.

== Early life ==
Burrow was born in Busselton, Western Australia, to American parents. He began surfing at age 7.

== Career ==
In 1998 he qualified for the ASP World Tour at the age of 18 years, becoming the youngest surfer to ever win a national title. Burrow had already earned a place on the world tour a year earlier, but he turned it down stating that, as a 17-year-old, he was "too young to do the tour full-on". After his first year on tour in 1998, Burrow claimed the ASP World Tour Rookie of the Year award after finishing 12th place in the rankings.

In 2007 Burrow won the Rip Curl Pro at Bells Beach, Victoria, Australia. He backed this up with a victory at the 2007 Billabong Pro in Jeffrey's Bay, South Africa, where he claimed the title over the then 8-time world champion, Kelly Slater. This win helped to secure his 2nd-place ranking on the ASP Men's Tour, his second runner-up season placing.

In 2009, Burrow defeated Slater in the final of the Billabong Pipeline Masters at the Banzai Pipeline. In the same year he finished fourth place on the World Tour.

Burrow won the 2013 Hurley Pro event in September 2013 for the first time, beating fellow Australian Julian Wilson.

=== Sponsors ===
As of September 2013, Burrow is sponsored by Globe, Billabong, Modom Surf, Von Zipper and Nanotune.

=== ASP Tour wins ===
Year	Event	Venue	Country
1999	Coke Surf Classic Manly	Manly Beach, Sydney	Australia
1999	Rio Marathon Surf INTERNATIONAL	Rio de Janeiro	Brazil
2001	Quiksilver Pro Gold Coast	Gold Coast	Australia
2002	Mundial Coca-Cola de Surf	Saquarema	Brazil
2004	Nova Schin Festival	Florianópolis	Brazil
2007	Billabong Pro Jeffreys Bay	Jeffreys Bay	South Africa
2007	Rip Curl Pro	Bells Beach	Australia
2009	Billabong Pipeline Masters	Banzai Pipeline	United States
2010	Quiksilver Pro Gold Coast	Gold Coast	Australia
2012	Quiksilver Pro Gold Coast	Gold Coast	Australia
2012	O'Neill Cold Water Classic Santa Cruz	Santa Cruz, California	United States
2013	Hurley Pro Trestles	San Clemente, California	United States

== Other projects ==
In 2003 Burrow released a book entitled Taj Burrow's Book of Hot Surfing, and has also produced a series of his own surf videos: Sabotaj (2000), Montaj (2002) and Taj Burrow's Fair Bits (2005).

In 2008–09 Globe released a shoe line named after Burrow.

Since 2005 Burrow has hosted the 'Taj Small Fries' junior surfing competition at Yallingup, Western Australia.

== Personal life ==
Burrow married Rebecca Jobson in November 2018. The couple had an intimate ceremony so Jobson's sick mother was able to attend. They had a second wedding in February 2019. The couple have two daughters. Jobson was a contestant (and placed 6th) on cycle 4 of Australia's Next Top Model in 2008.
