= Chris Ward (surfer) =

American professional surfer (born 1978)

Personal information
- Born: December 11, 1978 (age 47) Galveston, Texas, U.S.A.
- Height: 6 ft 0 in (1.83 m)
- Weight: 175 lb (79 kg)
- Website: www.whereswardo.com

Surfing career
- Sport: Surfing
- Best year: Ranked 14th on the ASP World Tour, 2008
- Career earnings: $397,500 (as of 2009)
- Sponsors: Creatures of Leisure accessories, Natural Light, Psycho Ward and Santa Monica Airlines

Surfing specifications
- Stance: Regular (natural) foot
- Shaper(s): Matt Biolis, Watermark Surf
- Quiver: 5'11" to 6'6" boards for most trips, bigger boards for Tahiti and Hawaii
- Favorite waves: Pipe
- Favorite maneuvers: Barrels

Chris Ward (born December 11, 1978) is an American professional surfer. As of 2014 he was competing in the qualification series for the ASP World Tour.

Ward began his elite tour campaign in 2005. The 2009 season is his 5th season on tour. His highest ASP World Tour rating was 11th in 2006.

As of 2009 his total career earnings are $397,500.

== Rating history on the ASP World Tour ==
- 2008: 14th
- 2007: 17th
- 2006: 21st
- 2005: 34th
