= Sofía Mulánovich =

Peruvian surfer (born 1983)

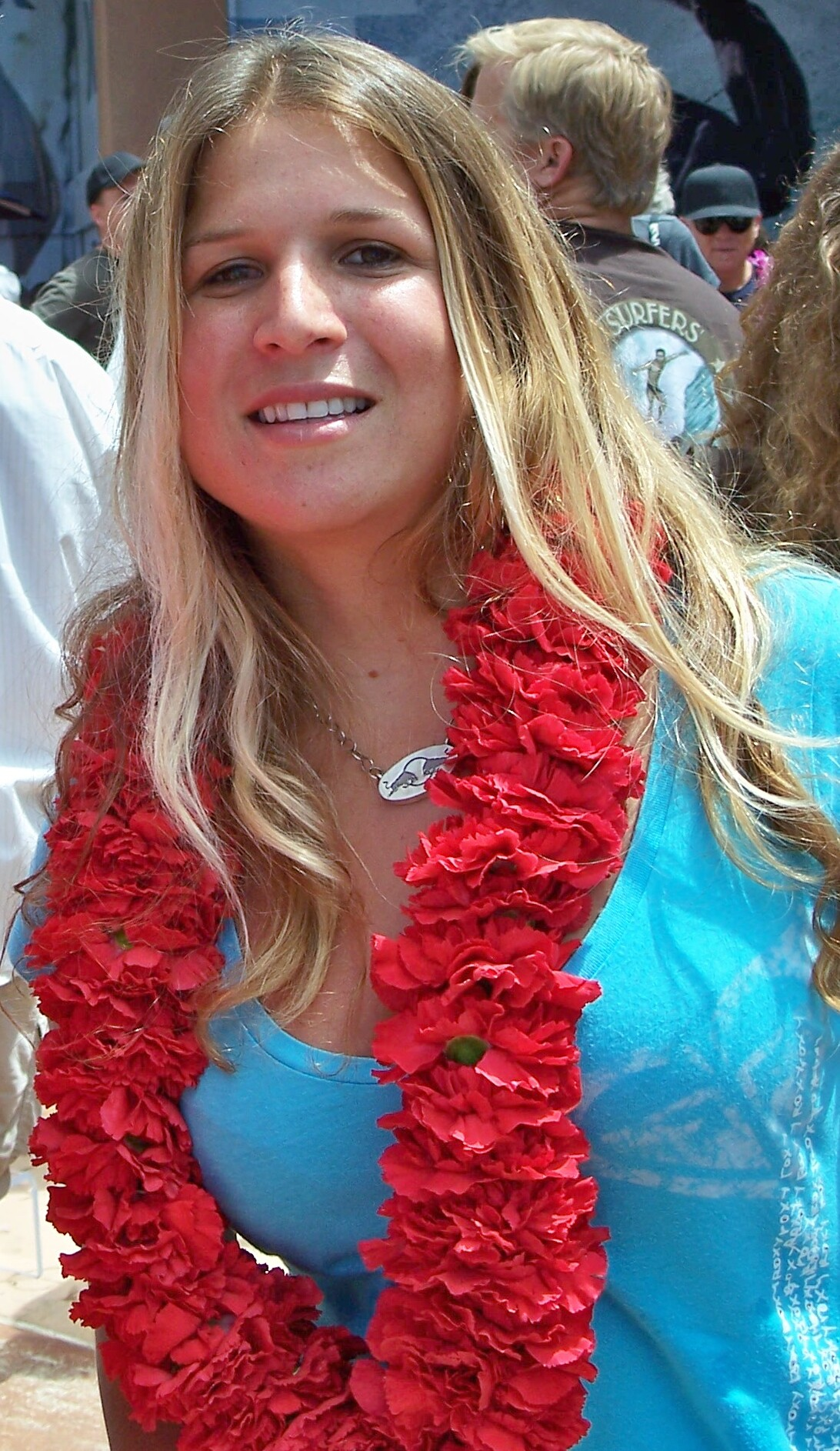
- Mulánovich in July 2007

Personal information
- Born: Sofía Mulánovich Aljovín; 24 June 1983 (age 43) Punta Hermosa, Lima, Peru
- Height: 5 ft 4 in (163 cm)
- Weight: 127 lb (58 kg)

Surfing career
- Sport: Surfing
- Best year: 2004 – ASP World Champion
- Career earnings: $468,100
- Sponsors: Roxy, Red Bull, Movistar, Reef, Al Merrick, LAN airline
- Major achievements: Surfers Hall of Fame inductee: 2004, 2019 ISA World Surfing Games Champion

Surfing specifications
- Stance: Regular
Medal record
Women's surfing
Representing Peru
World Games
Gold medal – first place	2004 Salinas	Women
Gold medal – first place	2010 Punta Hermosa	Team
Gold medal – first place	2019 Miyazaki	Women
Silver medal – second place	2011 Playa Venao	Women
Bronze medal – third place	2000 Maracaipe	Women
Bronze medal – third place	2010 Punta Hermosa	Women

Sofía Mulánovich Aljovín (Note: In this Spanish name, the first or paternal surname is Mulánovich and the second or maternal family name is Aljovín.) (born 24 June 1983) is a Peruvian surfer. She is a 3-time World Surfing Champion, 1 WSL and 2 ISA world championships,. She is the first Peruvian surfer ever to win a World Surf League World Championship Tour event (ex ASP) and the first Latin American woman ever to win the World Title, which she did in 2004 (Peruvian Felipe Pomar won the Men's World Surfing Championship in 1965) In 2004, she won three out of the six World Championship Tour events, and finished the season as Absolute World Champion. Sofia is the only Latin-American surfer to win 2 ISA World Championships. Sofia won the ISA Championships, 2004 in Salinas-Ecuador and 2019 in Miyazaki-Japan. Her main sponsor is Roxy.

Mulánovich was inducted into the Surfing Hall of Fame in 2007 due to her achievement in 2004 and 2005. In 2004, she became the first South American and Latin American (man or woman) to ever win the world title. Sofia's list of credits to date is impressive, having won the Vans Triple Crown of Surfing, U.S. Open of Surfing and the Surfer Poll (2004 and 2005).

== Early life ==
Sofía Mulánovich Aljovín was born in Punta Hermosa, Lima, Peru.

On 27 July 2007, Mulánovich was inducted into the Surfers Hall of Fame in Huntington Beach, California, United States. She is the first South American to have this honor, and was chosen for having had a major impact on the sport by her outstanding achievements. In 2015, she was also inducted into the Surfing Walk of Fame in Huntington Beach. Also in 2015 in a collaboration with Swatch, she opened a surfing academy (Proyecto Sofia Mulanovich) for youths from all backgrounds, in her home town of Punta Hermosa in Lima.

== Achievements ==
WSL Women's Championship Tour Wins
Year	Event	Venue	Country
2004	Roxy Pro Fiji	Tavarua	Fiji
2004	Billabong Pro Tahiti	Teahupoo, Tahiti	French Polynesia
2004	Roxy Jam	Anglet	France
2005	SPC Fruit Pro	Bells Beach, Victoria	Australia
2005	Roxy Pro Fiji	Tavarua	Fiji
2005	Roxy Pro England	Cornwall	England
2007	Rip Curl Girls Festival	Santander	Spain
2007	Roxy Pro	Sunset Beach, Hawaii	United States
2008	Roxy Pro Gold Coast	Gold Coast, Queensland	Australia
2009	Movistar Peru Classic	Lobitos	Peru

- 2019
  - 2019 1st Place ISA World Surfing Games
- 2016
  - 2016 1st Place QS Maui and Sons Pichilemu Women's Pro
- 2009
  - 2009 1st Place Movistar Peru Classic (WCT)
  - 2009 1st place Copa Movistar, Peru (WQS)
- 2008
  - 2009 2nd Place Billabong Girls Pro Rio
  - 2008 2nd Place Rip Curl Pro, Australia
  - 2008 1st Place Roxy Pro Gold Coast, Australia
- 2007
  - 2007 Inducted into Surfing Hall of Fame
  - 2007 1st Place Roxy Pro Sunset Beach, Hawaii
  - 2007 1st Place Rip Curl Girls Festival Europe, Spain
  - 2007 2nd Place Rip Curl Pro Bells Beach, Australia
  - 2007 2nd Place World Championship Tour
- 2006
  - 2006 Vans Triple Crown of Surfing Champion (récord)
  - 2006 5th Place World Championship Tour
  - 2006 1st Place US Open of Surfing Huntington Beach, California (WQS)
  - 2006 2nd Place Billabong Girls Itacare, Brasil (WQS)
  - 2006 1st Place OP Pro Hawaii Haleiwa, Oahu (WQS)
  - 2006 Teen Choice Award won – Choice Action Sports Female
- 2005
  - 2005 ESPY Best Action-Sports Athlete
  - 2005 2nd Place World Championship Tour
  - 2005 1st Place Roxy Pro UK, United Kingdom
  - 2005 1st Place Roxy Pro Tavarua, Fiji
  - 2005 1st Place Rip Curl Pro Bells Beach, Australia
  - 2005 3rd Place Telefónica Cup Asia Beach, Peru
  - 2005 3rd Place Billabong Pro Teahupoo, Tahiti
- 2004
  - 2004 1st Place ISA Women's World Championship
  - 2004 1st Place WSL Women's World Championship Tour
  - 2004 1st Place Rip Curl Girls Festival Europe, France
  - 2004 1st Place Billabong Pro Teahupoo, Tahiti
  - 2004 1st Place Roxy Pro, Fiji
- 2003
  - 2003 3rd Place WCT Roxy ProTavarua, Fiji
  - 2003 2nd Place WQS Roxy Pro Phillip Island, Australia
  - 2003 2nd on the World Qualifying Series (WQS)
  - 2003 7th on the World Championship Tour (WCT)
  - 2003 Voted Number 5 Top Female Surfer, Surfer Poll Award
- 2002
  - 2002 2nd Place WQS ASP Turtle Bay, Hawaii
  - 2002 2nd Place WCT Roxy Pro South West Coast, France
  - 2002 4th Place WQS Rip Curl Pro Hossegor, France
  - 2002 3rd Place WQS US Open of Surfing Huntington Beach, CA
  - 2002 Qualified for the 2003 World Championship Tour
  - 2002 Ranked 2nd on WQS Tour
  - 2002 Voted by Surfer Magazine as the Number 1 Female Grommet (a.k.a. Best Upcoming Female Surfer)
  - 2002 Four-Time Peruvian National Champion 1999–2002

== Filmography ==
- Peel: The Peru Project (2006) (V) as Surfer
- Sofia: A Documentary (2006), as herself
- The Modus Mix (2003) (V)
- 7 Girls (2001) documentary
- Into The Storm/En La Tormenta (2020) documentary, as herself (Director: Adam Brown)

== Personal life ==
She is openly lesbian and welcomed a son with her girlfriend Camila Toro.

== Notes ==
Preceded by Layne Beachley	World surfing champion (Women); 2004	Succeeded by Chelsea Georgeson
