= Trestles (surfing) =

Surfing breaks in San Clemente, California

Coordinates: 33.385°N 117.595°W

Surfers at San Clemente (1990)

Trestles is a 1.5 mi (2.4 km) strand of surfing spots along the Pacific Ocean between northern San Onofre State Beach in San Diego County and southern San Clemente in Orange County in California. A seasonal watercourse, San Mateo Creek, runs through the center of Trestles and empties into the ocean. Trestles is named after Trestles Bridge, a wooden trestle bridge that carried the Surf Line that surfers must walk under to reach the beach, replaced in 2012 by a concrete viaduct. Trestles will host the surfing competition at the 2028 Summer Olympics.

== Description ==
Surfers have named different areas of Trestles: Cottons Point, Barbed Wires, Upper Trestles, Middle Trestles, Church, Lower Trestles, and Inbetweens.

Lower Trestles consistently has the best waves of the group. The surf at Lowers is especially good because the waves hit a reef in front of the San Mateo creekbed. Uppers is less consistent, but it has the potential to be a good wave with a long ride. In 1963, Greg Noll described Trestles as "South swell, rock bottom, right slide, wall-type surf."

North of Uppers is Cotton's Point. Cottons is known for a "classic left-hand break." Noll described Cottons as "Rock bottom, left slide, semi-wall, south swell."

He described San Onofre as the "number-one spot on the coast for a beginner. Breaks approximately 150 yards out, producing a long ride comparable to Waikiki or the Cove. Combination rock and sand bottom with south or southwest swell. Can be ridden in either direction. Semi-wall type surf."

== Access and amenities ==
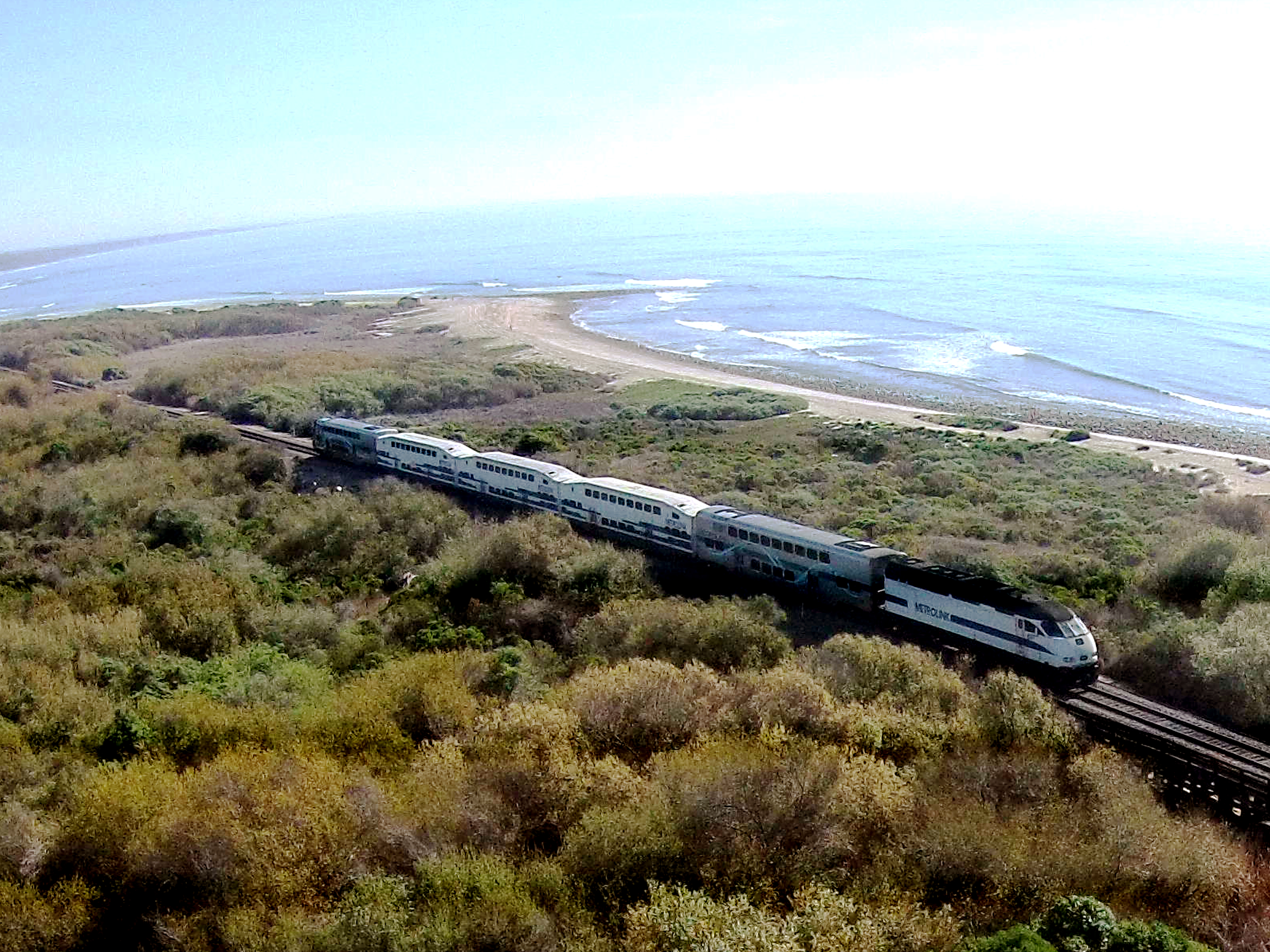
The namesake railroad tracks

Trestles has two major access points:

1. Visitors can park and walk down an asphalt trail to Trestles from the trailhead at Cristianitos Road, near where Cristianitos crosses over the San Diego Freeway. There is a pay parking lot near the Carl's Jr. restaurant on Coast Highway at Cristianitos, along with some public parking on streets near the restaurant. There is no fee to walk, skateboard, or bike into Trestles by means of this trail. Most visitors enter Trestles by this trail.
2. Visitors can park at San Onofre State Beach by exiting the San Diego Freeway at Basilone Road, then heading west from the freeway exit to the entrance to the portion of San Onofre State Beach named Surf Beach. The hike northwest to Trestles from Surf Beach at San Onofre State Beach is considerably longer than the hike southwest from the Cristianitos Road bridge and the San Diego Freeway. There is a fee to drive into the State Park at Surf Beach.

There is really nowhere to park a car, although when contests are held on the beach, state park officials open up a stretch that can fit maybe 200 vehicles.

== Plant and animal life ==
Trestles park is home to a variety of plant and animal life. It is known for its littleneck clams. Surfers used to dive for California lobsters. California brown pelicans are common. During times of heavy rains, there is usually a river delta flowing into the ocean where there are often tadpoles.

The most common plant community is the coastal sage scrub, which is native to the coast of California and thrives in the area's Mediterranean climate. One plant which grows right out of the sand is the beach evening primrose.

== History ==
Panhe, an Acjachemen village, was located at the San Mateo campground area of San Onofre State Beach, straddling the San Diego–Orange county border off Cristianitos Road near Trestles. It remains a sacred, ceremonial, cultural, and burial site for the Acjachemen people. Many Acjachemen people trace their lineage back to Panhe. It is the site of the first baptism in California, and in 1769, the first close contact between Spanish explorers, Catholic missionaries, and the Acjachemen people. The Acjachemen people built the mission at San Juan Capistrano. The advocacy group Save Panhe and San Onofre State Beach state that not only is Panhe one of the most historically significant sacred sites of the Acjachemen people, but that Panhe is also important to all Californians and Americans.

Trestles was originally part of Camp Pendleton, a base of the United States Marine Corps. Surfing at Trestles dates to at least 1940s, when the surfboard were made of redwood. Surfers "rebelled in 1951 when Marine commanders at Camp Pendleton put up a gate to control access to the beach. The surfers tore down the no-parking signs and used them for firewood, threw burning wood at commuter trains and almost burned down the railroad trestle that gave the area its name," but the Marines, many of whom were combat veterans of the recently concluded Pacific War, were unimpressed. In the 1960s USMC military police would periodically arrest surfers and confiscate surfboards. In 1962 the Press-Telegram reported that San Onofre–Trestles–"Jarhead" beach "was a lightning ride when really big surf is in—combers 15 to 18 feet above bottom. Expert stuff on rough days." In 1968, a Santa Barbara News feature on the ecological importance of the coastal kelp beds told that "Old timers like to tell of the spacious kelpbeds off Trestles, in the San Clemente area, and off Laguna. And the waves, these old-timers say, stayed glassey all day, no matter how hard the wind blew."

The San Onofre Surf Club had a private lease on part of Trestles for a period of time but lost it by the early 1970s amid controversies over "special privileges." There were security concerns about unauthorized use of the beach by surfers during the Richard Nixon administration as his "western White House" home, La Casa Pacifica, was in nearby San Clemente. Nixon transferred San Onofre State Beach from the Marines to the state of California in 1970. Trestles was leased to the California State Parks department in 1977.

For many years, the WSL World Tour surfing competition and the NSSA Nationals were annually held at Lowers.

== Toll road controversy ==
The California Transportation Corridor Agency (TCA) has sought to construct a 16-mile long six-lanes wide toll highway (graded for eight lanes) through San Onofre State Beach/Park and a habitat reserve in Orange County, joining the San Diego Freeway at Trestles.

The Toll Road, which is one of several routes that could be constructed to extend California State Route 241, is favored by several business groups and public officials from Orange County as a way to ease future traffic congestion. The particular Toll Road route through San Onofre is opposed by more than two dozen members of California's congressional delegation in Washington, D.C., thirty-eight California legislators including former California United States Senator Barbara Boxer, Surfrider Foundation, Defenders of Wildlife, The Sierra Club, The Natural Resources Defense Council, the California State Parks Foundation, the California State Park and Recreation Commission the Native American United Coalition to Protect Panhe, The City Project, the Save San Onofre Coalition, and Save Trestles, among others. Opposition is based upon the damage to the environment that would result from construction and operation of the Toll Road, the loss of park camping and recreational areas, the loss/damage to a site sacred to Native Americans, and studies that show that traffic congestion would actually increase on the San Diego Freeway if the toll road is built through San Onofre Beach. A survey of Orange County voters revealed that while 52% favored a connection in some capacity, 66% opposed the proposed route that would take the Toll Road through San Onofre State Park.

On 6 February 2008, the California Coastal Commission denied a Coastal Permit for the route of the proposed 241 Toll Road that would have cut through San Onofre and the Reserve, saying that of the eight possible routes considered, the one sought by the TCA was the most environmentally damaging. Had a permit been granted, it would have been the first toll road to run through a California state park. On 18 December 2008, The Department of Commerce announced that it would uphold the California Coastal Commission's ruling that found the TCA's proposed extension of the 241 Toll Road inconsistent with the California Coastal Act. The Department of Commerce noted in a release that at least one reasonable alternative to the project existed, and that the project was not necessary in the interest of national security. On 22 May 2013, environmentalists filed a new lawsuit to stop the building of the Toll Road in segments, a tactic they say is an illegitimate end-run around by the TCA after the Toll Road was defeated in 2008.

== In popular culture ==
- Trestles is mentioned in the 1963 Beach Boys' song Surfin' U.S.A.

== See also ==
- Doheny State Beach
