= Lorraine Nicholson =

American actress (born 1990)

- Born: Lorraine Broussard Nicholson; April 16, 1990 (age 36); Los Angeles, California, U.S.
- Education: Brown University
- Occupation: Actress
- Years active: 2003–present
- Parents: Jack Nicholson (father); Rebecca Broussard (mother)
- Relatives: Ray Nicholson (brother)

Lorraine Broussard Nicholson (born April 16, 1990) is an American actress. She is best known for playing Alana Blanchard in the biographical film Soul Surfer (2011).

== Early life ==
Nicholson was born in Los Angeles to actors Jack Nicholson and Rebecca Broussard. She was named after her father's aunt. She has a younger brother, Raymond, as well as two older half-siblings (a half-sister, Jennifer Nicholson and a half-brother, Caleb Goddard) and a younger half-sister Tessa. She was four years old when her parents separated. She was childhood friends with Hugh Hefner's children.

Nicholson served as Miss Golden Globe at the 2007 Golden Globe Awards ceremony.

In 2008, she graduated from Brentwood School in the Brentwood neighborhood of Los Angeles.

In 2012, she graduated from Brown University.

== Career ==
Nicholson's first on-screen appearance was as an extra, at the age of 13, in her father's movie Something's Gotta Give. In 2008, she provided the voice of Katie in the animated film Fly Me to the Moon.

After mostly minor roles as a child actor, Nicholson landed her first major role in Soul Surfer, playing Bethany Hamilton's best friend Alana Blanchard, who was there to help her after a shark attack took her left arm. As Blanchard was a competitive surfer, Nicholson had to take a crash course in wave riding.

In a 2011 interview, Nicholson stated, "I love to act and I also hope to one day write and direct and create my own projects. I feel that in the film industry, especially as a woman, it's really important to make your own luck – and create projects to give other people really strong opportunities as well as yourself."

Nicholson starred in Anonymous (2016), playing an expert hacker.

Nicholson wrote, produced, and directed a 15-minute coming-of-age drama titled The Instant Message. She later directed and wrote a short film titled This Magic Moment. In 2017, Nicholson released her third short film, Life Boat, which premiered at the 2017 Tribeca Film Festival. That same year, she was accepted into the AFI Directing Workshop for Women, a mentorship and education program geared towards female filmmaking. She has directed music videos for K. Flay and Metric.

== Filmography ==
Year	Title	Role	Notes
2003	Something's Gotta Give	Young Girl in Market	
2004	The Princess Diaries 2: Royal Engagement	Princess Lorraine	
2006	Click	Samantha Newman (at 16 years old)	
2008	Fly Me to the Moon	Katie	Voice role
2009	World's Greatest Dad	Heather	
2011	Soul Surfer	Alana Blanchard	
2012	The Cottage	Vanessa	
2014	The Pimp and the Rose		Short film
2015	Hacker	Kira Whittal	
2015	Endings, Inc.	Nikki Wheaton	Short film
2016	Room 105	Sam	
2026	Madden	Isabelle	

Awards
Preceded by Dakota Johnson	Miss Golden Globe; 2007	Succeeded by Rumer Willis (no award given in 2008)
