= Alana Blanchard =

American professional surfer and model (born 1990)

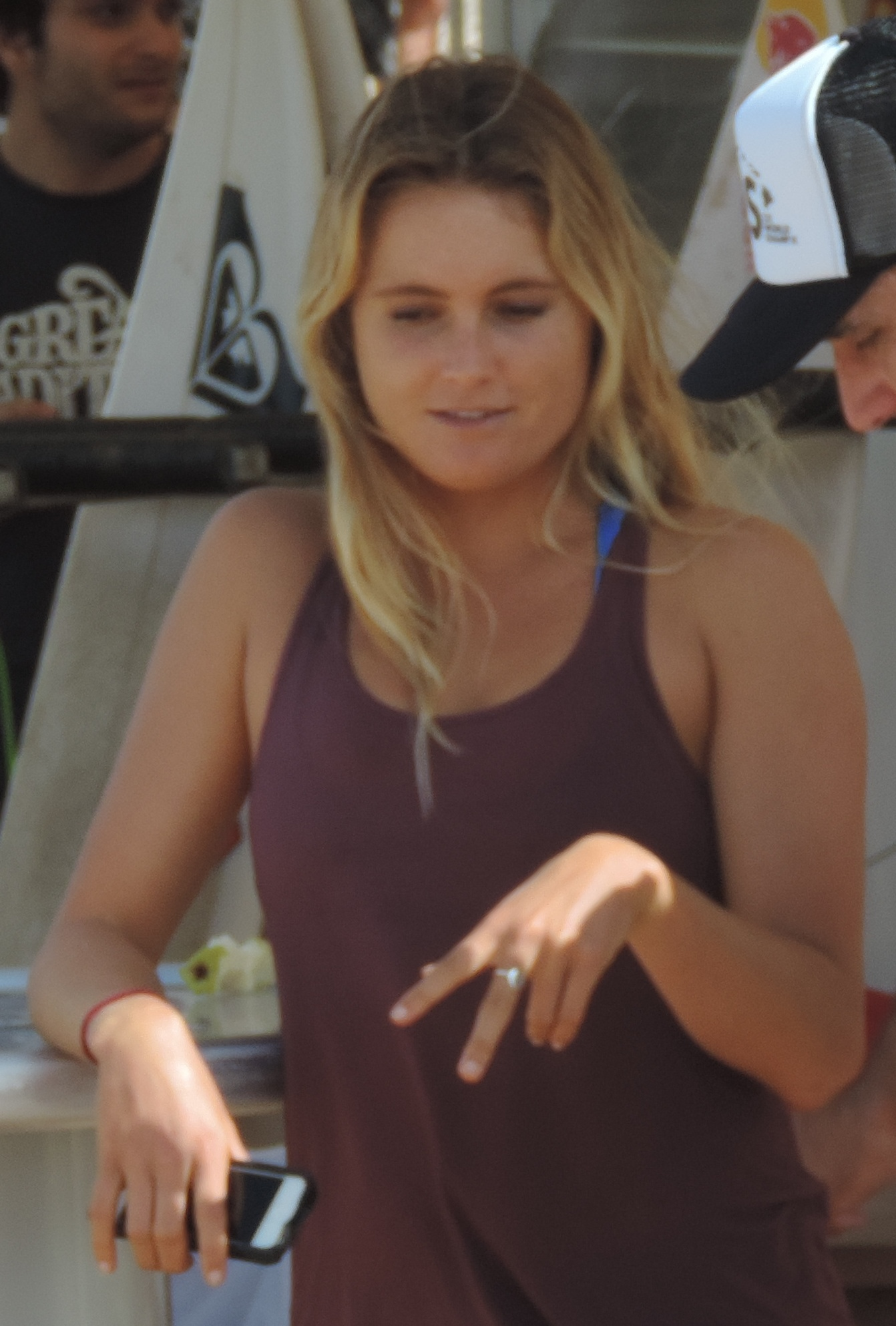
- Blanchard in October 2013
- Born: Alana Rene Blanchard; March 5, 1990 (age 36); Kauaʻi, Hawaii, United States
- Spouse: Jack Freestone
- Children: 2
- Surfing career
- Nickname: Lana
- Height: 5 ft 8 in (1.73 m)
- Sport: Surfing
- Sponsors: Hurley, Reef, SPY Optic, Sticky Bumps, GoPro, Rockstar, Channel Islands

Surfing specifications
- Stance: Natural (Regular)
- Shaper: Al Merrick
- Favorite waves: Hanalei Bay
- Favorite maneuvers: Airs

Alana Rene Blanchard (born March 5, 1990) is an American professional surfer and model. Blanchard has surfed on the ASP World Tour.

== Career ==
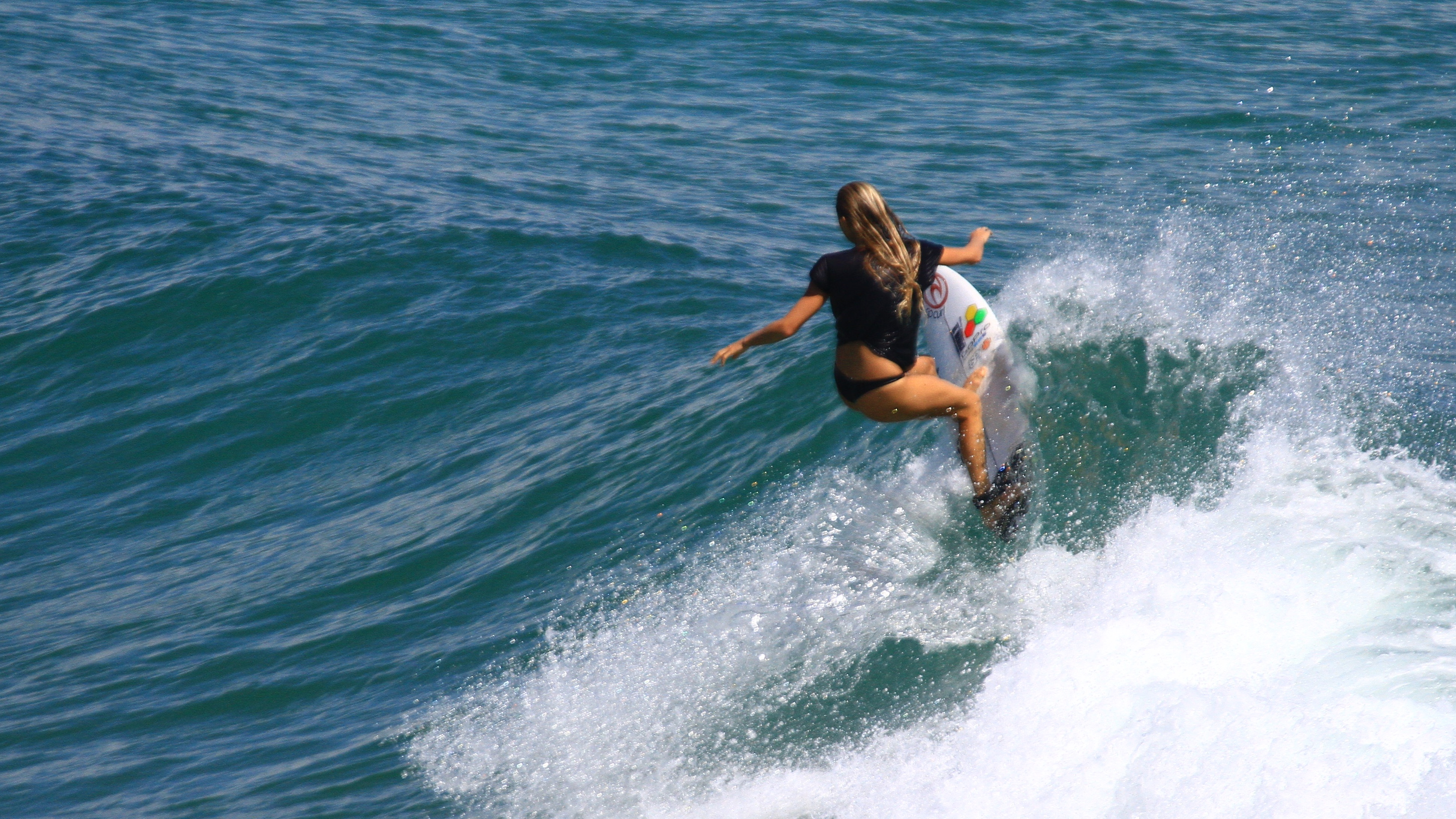
Blanchard in 2013

Alana Blanchard was first taught how to surf when she was just 4 years old by her father, Holt. Alana rode her first wave at Hanalei Pier in Kauaʻi, then went on to compete for the first time when she was 9 years old. Blanchard took first place in shortboard at the 2005 T&C Women's Pipeline Championships. She has also won championships in the following:

- The Women's Pipeline Championships, Hawaii
- The Rip Curl Girls Festival Junior Pro, Spain
- The Roxy Pro Trials in Haleiwa, Hawaii
- The Billabong Pro Pre Trials in Hookipa, Maui
- The Volcom Pufferfish Surf Series in Pinetrees, Kauaʻi.

Beginning in 2004, Blanchard also established her professional relationship with Rip Curl swimwear, in which she designed and modeled, including a line of wetsuits. In 2020, Rip Curl ended their sponsorship which Blanchard believes was due to her becoming a mother. In a statement, Rip Curl denied that this was the reason blaming it on an inability for Rip Curl and Blanchard to agree to terms of a new deal. In May 2017, the Hawaiian surfer launched the Alana Blanchard Foundation (ABF) with the goal of supporting female talent in the sport of surfing. She also has a large influence on social media with 1.8 million followers on Instagram and 102K subscribers on YouTube.

== Personal life ==
In 2013, Blanchard began dating Australian pro surfer Jack Freestone after they met while on the North Shore of Oahu, Hawaii. In June 2017, the couple announced that they were expecting their first child. The couple became engaged in June 2019 and wed sometime before 2024. Their second child was born in 2021.

She is a long time best friend and supporter of Bethany Hamilton and was present along with her father when Hamilton suffered the shark attack that cost her her left arm at age thirteen. In the 2011 film Soul Surfer, Blanchard was portrayed by Lorraine Nicholson.

Blanchard is a vegan.
