= The Masked Singer (American TV series) season 12 =

The Masked Singer
- Season 12
- Promotional poster for season twelve, featuring "Chess Piece"
- Starring: Robin Thicke; Jenny McCarthy Wahlberg; Ken Jeong; Rita Ora
- Hosted by: Nick Cannon
- No. of contestants: 15
- Winner: Boyz II Men as "Buffalos"
- Runner-up: Mario as "Wasp"
- No. of episodes: 12

Release
- Original network: Fox
- Original release: September 25 – December 18, 2024

Season chronology
- ← Previous; Season 11 Next → Season 13

The twelfth season of the American television series The Masked Singer premiered on Fox on September 25, 2024, and concluded on December 18, 2024. The season was won by vocal R&B group Boyz II Men as the "Buffalos", with singer Mario finishing second as "Wasp".

== Panelists and host ==
Season 12 panelists and host

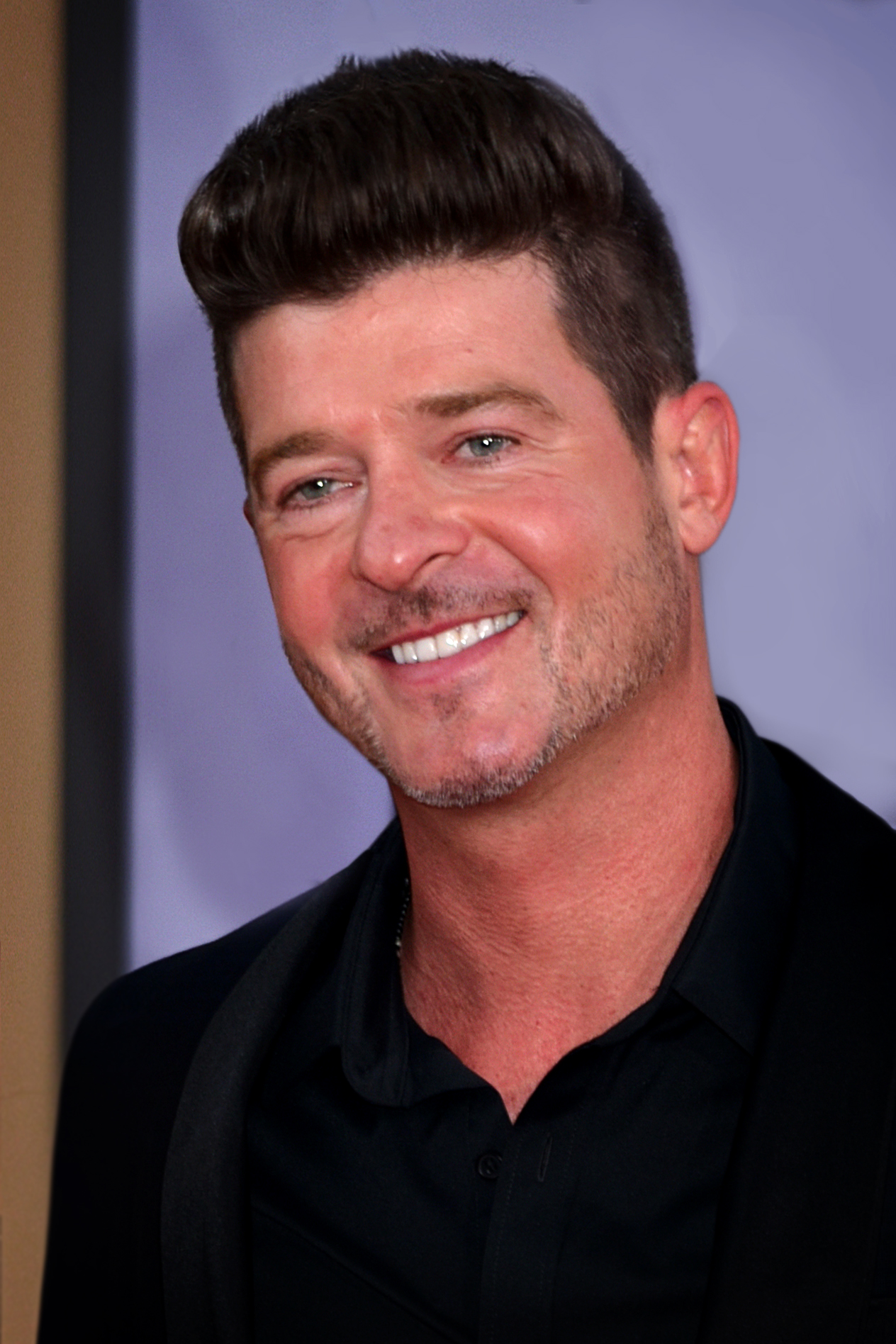
Robin Thicke

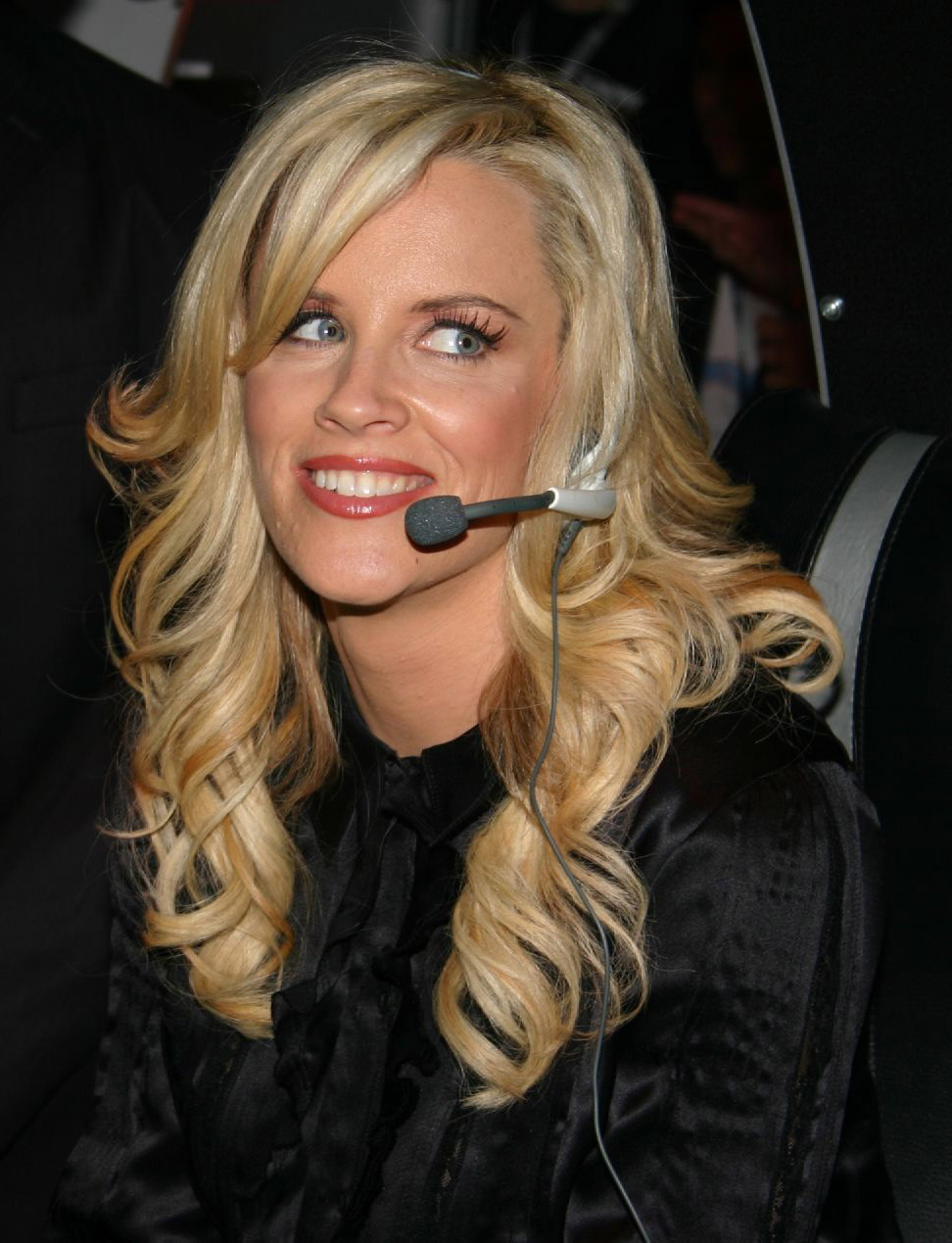
Jenny McCarthy Wahlberg

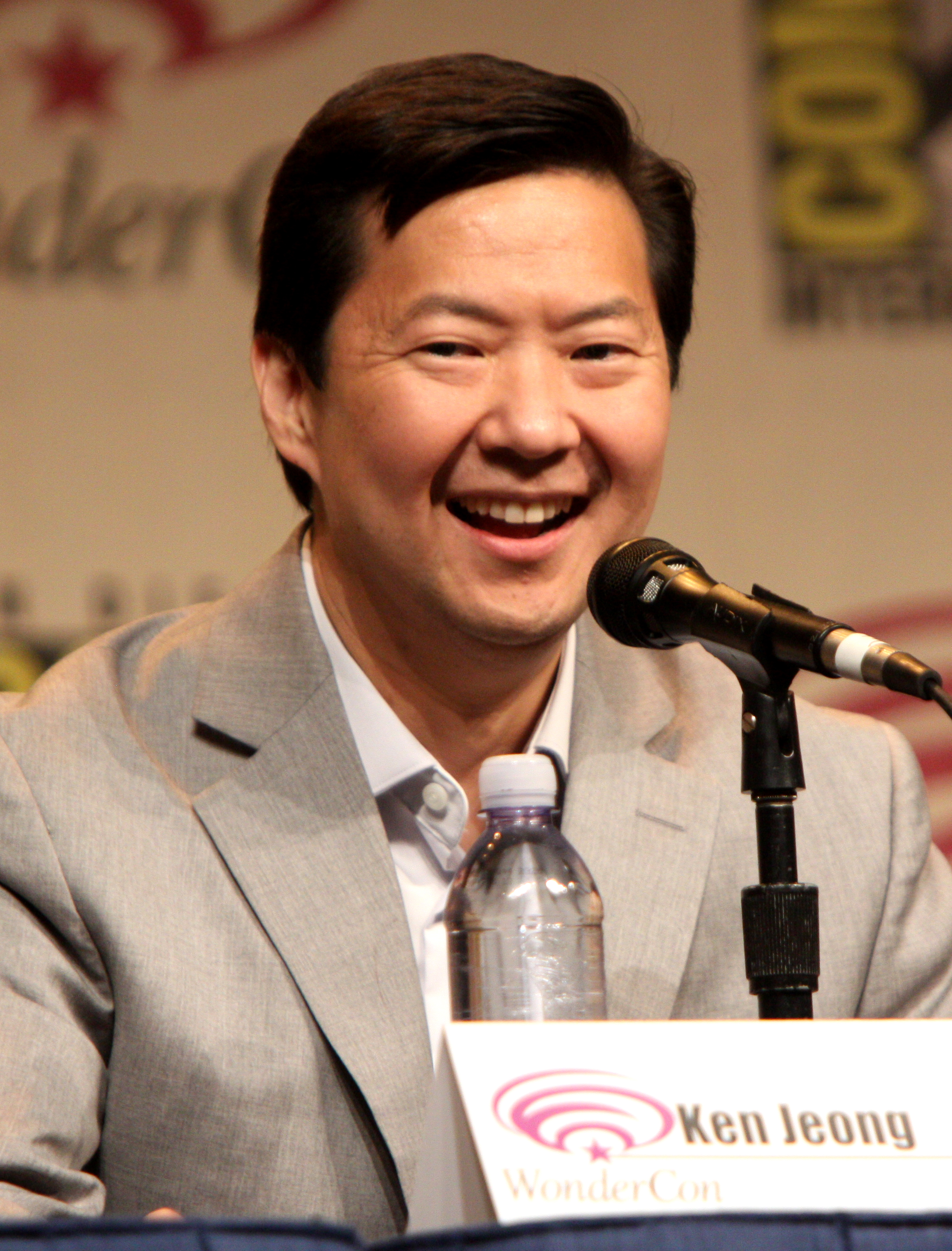
Ken Jeong

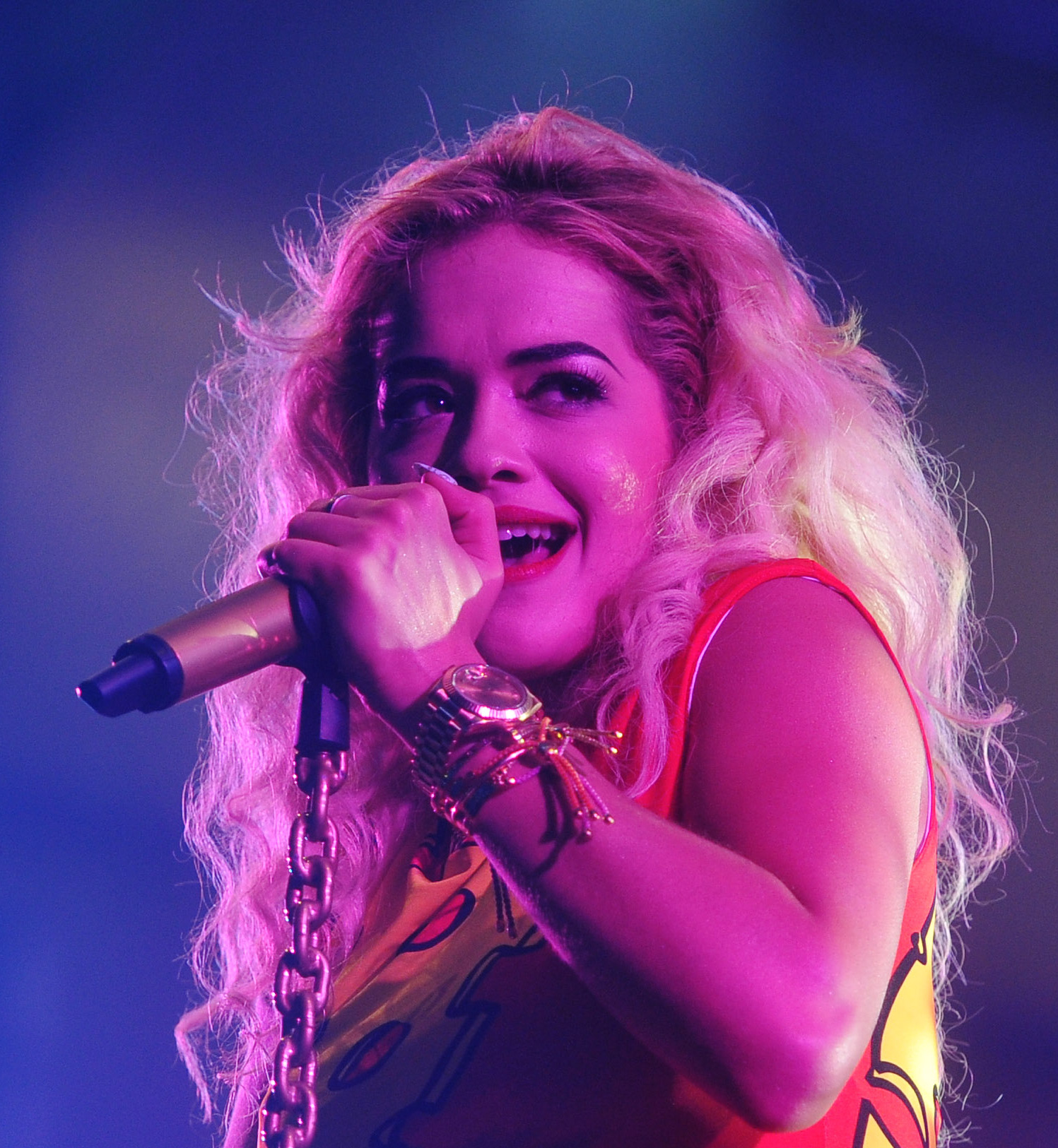
Rita Ora

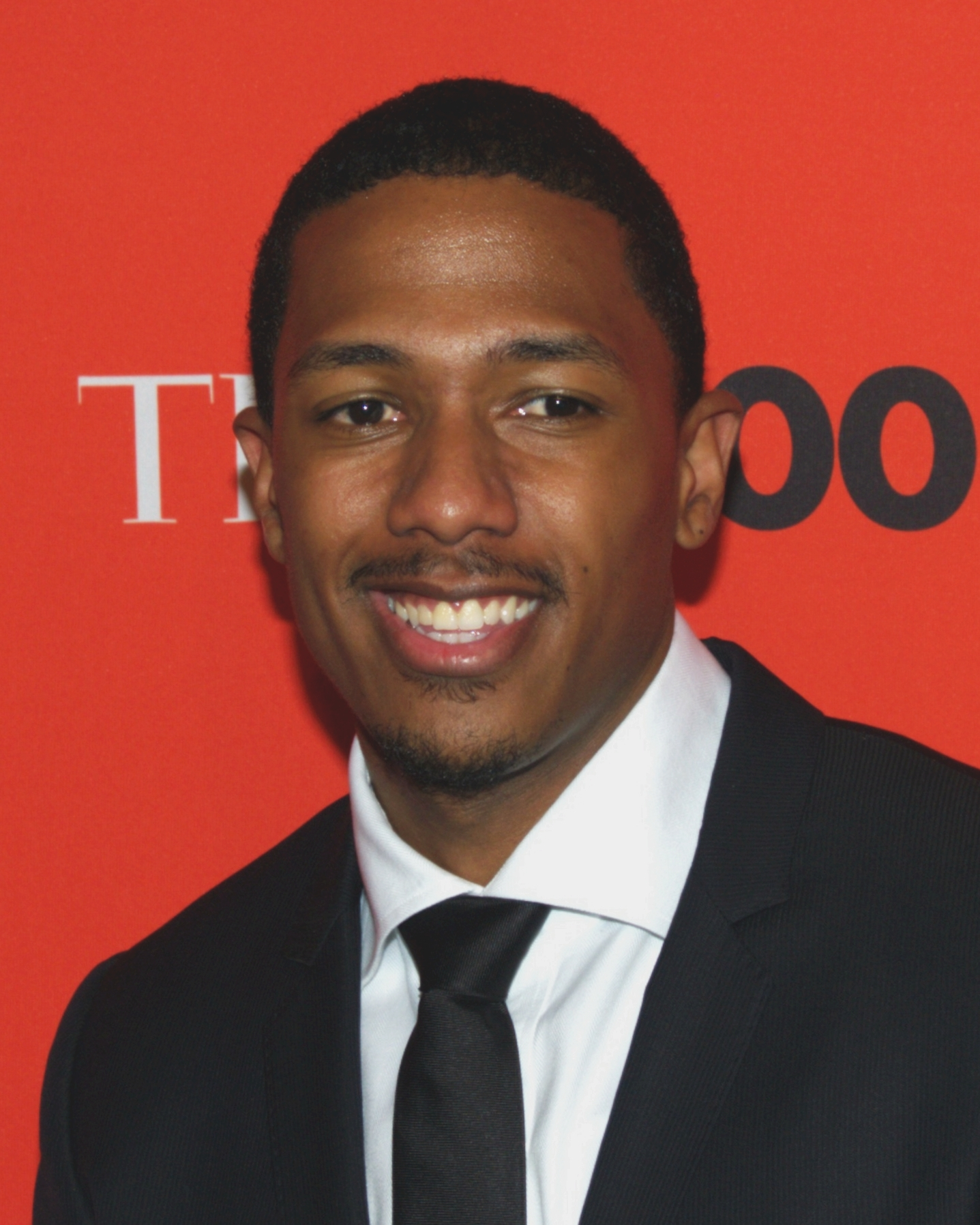
Nick Cannon

Nick Cannon, singer-songwriter Robin Thicke, television and radio personality Jenny McCarthy Wahlberg, actor and comedian Ken Jeong and recording artist Rita Ora all returned from the previous season. Ora was absent in the eleventh episode due to illness, so Robin Thicke, Jenny McCarthy, and Ken Jeong appeared alone.

William Shatner, who portrayed "Knight" during the eighth season, appeared as a special guest during the first episode. Kevin Bacon appeared as a special guest during the second episode. Joel McHale and Nikki Glaser (who portrayed "Snowstorm" in the eighth season) appeared as guest commentators in the fourth episode. The Peanuts gang appeared during the ninth episode. Season five winner Nick Lachey, Robin's mother Gloria Loring, and Rita's husband Taika Waititi, the latter two appearing in the audience, appeared in the season finale.

== Production ==
Much like the previous seasons of the series, the twelfth season features the return of themed nights. Throughout the season, themes include nights dedicated to Miley Cyrus and the film Footloose. Additionally, other themes include a night dedicated to Barbie, "60s Night", "Sports Night", "Who Are You Fest", and "Thanksgiving". "Soundtrack Of My Life" was featured once again.

== Contestants ==
The contestants were revealed between August 15 and September 23, 2024. The season features 15 contestants divided into three groups of five. This is the first season since the seventh season to not feature Wild Card contestants or contestants that join the competition later than the rest.

On August 15, 2024, it was confirmed that former contestants such as Dick Van Dyke, Jewel, Ne-Yo, and DeMarcus Ware would appear as Mask Ambassadors for the new contestants throughout the season.

The Buffalos made history as they became the first group ever to win in the American edition of the Masked Singer.

Stage name	Celebrity	Occupation(s)	Mask Ambassador	Episodes											
Stage name	Celebrity	Occupation(s)	Mask Ambassador	1	2	3	4	5	6	7	8	9	10	11	12
Stage name	Celebrity	Occupation(s)	Mask Ambassador	Group A			Group B			Group C			10	11	12
Buffalos	Boyz II Men	Vocal R&B group	Nick Lachey	SAFE	SAFE	WIN							SAFE	RISK	WINNERS
Wasp	Mario	Singer	Ne-Yo				SAFE	SAFE	WIN				SAFE	WIN	RUNNER-UP
Strawberry Shortcake	AJ Michalka	Actor/singer	Hayley Orrantia							SAFE	SAFE	WIN	RISK	OUT	
Goo	Kobie Turner	NFL player	Keenan Allen				SAFE	SAFE	KEPT (Note: While in the middle of their unmasking and per the chanting of the audience, panelist Jenny McCarthy Wahlberg used the "Ding Dong Keep It On" bell to save Goo from elimination, allowing the portrayer to keep their mask on and continue in the competition.)				OUT		
Sherlock Hound	Bronson Arroyo	Former MLB player	Barry Zito							SAFE	SAFE	OUT			
Royal Knight	Jana Kramer	Actor/singer	Savannah Chrisley							SAFE	SAFE	OUT			
Ice King	Drake Bell	Actor/musician	Hanson							SAFE	OUT				
Macaron	Bethany Hamilton	Surfer	Willie Robertson							OUT					
Bluebell	Natalie Imbruglia	Actor/singer	Kelly Osbourne				SAFE	SAFE	OUT						
Chess Piece	Laverne Cox	Actor/activist	Nikki Glaser				SAFE	OUT							
Dust Bunny	Andy Richter	Actor/comedian	Dick Van Dyke				OUT								
Ship	Paula Cole	Singer	Jewel	SAFE	SAFE	OUT									
Woodpecker	Marsai Martin	Actor/producer	Jenifer Lewis	SAFE	SAFE	OUT									
Showbird	Yvette Nicole Brown (Note: Brown was previously a guest panelist during the third season.)	Actor	Joel McHale	SAFE	OUT										
Leaf Sheep	John Elway	Former NFL quarterback	DeMarcus Ware	OUT											

- WIN The masked singer won with their performance and advanced in the competition.
- KEPT The masked singer was saved from elimination by a panelist using the "Ding Dong Keep It On" bell.
- SAFE The masked singer was safe from elimination.
- RISK The masked singer was in the bottom two, but was not eliminated.
- OUT The masked singer was eliminated from the competition and unmasked.
- The masked singer did not perform.
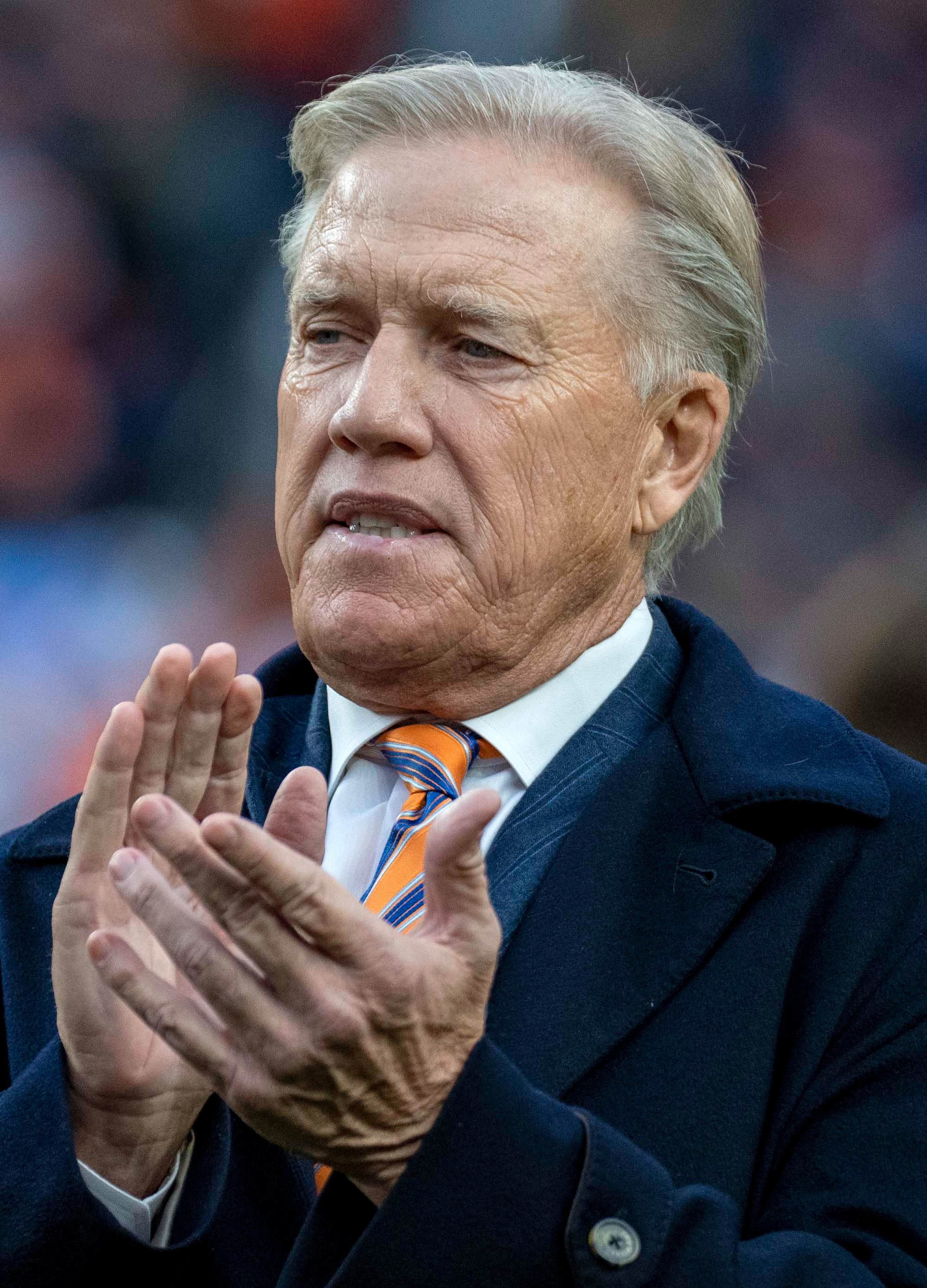
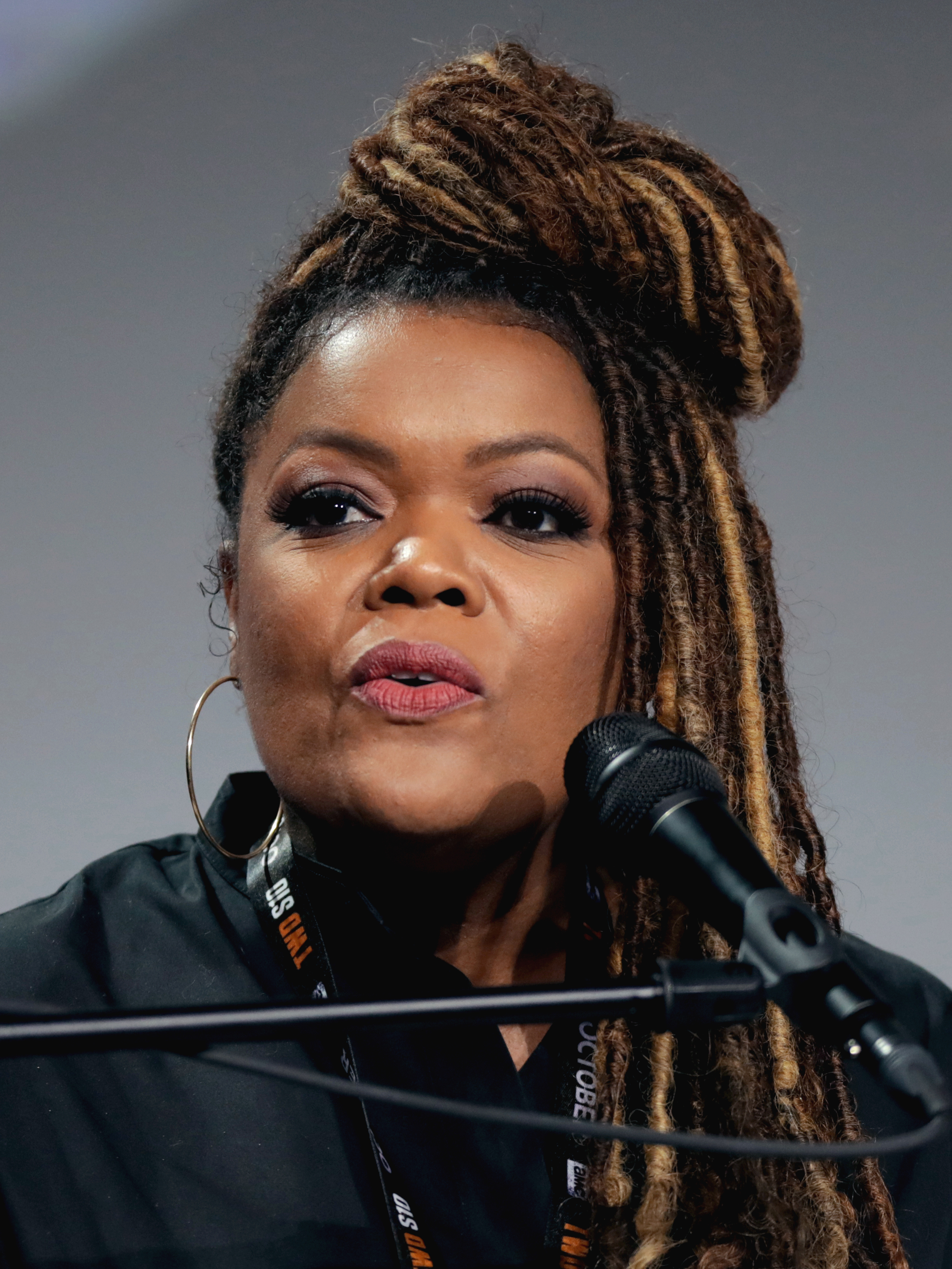
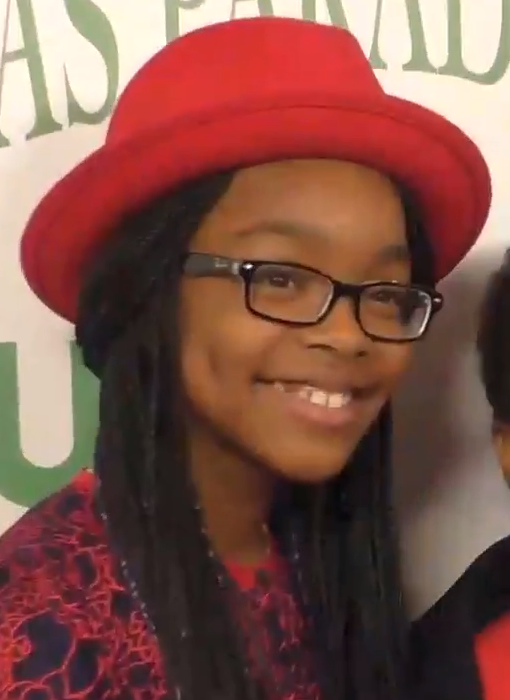
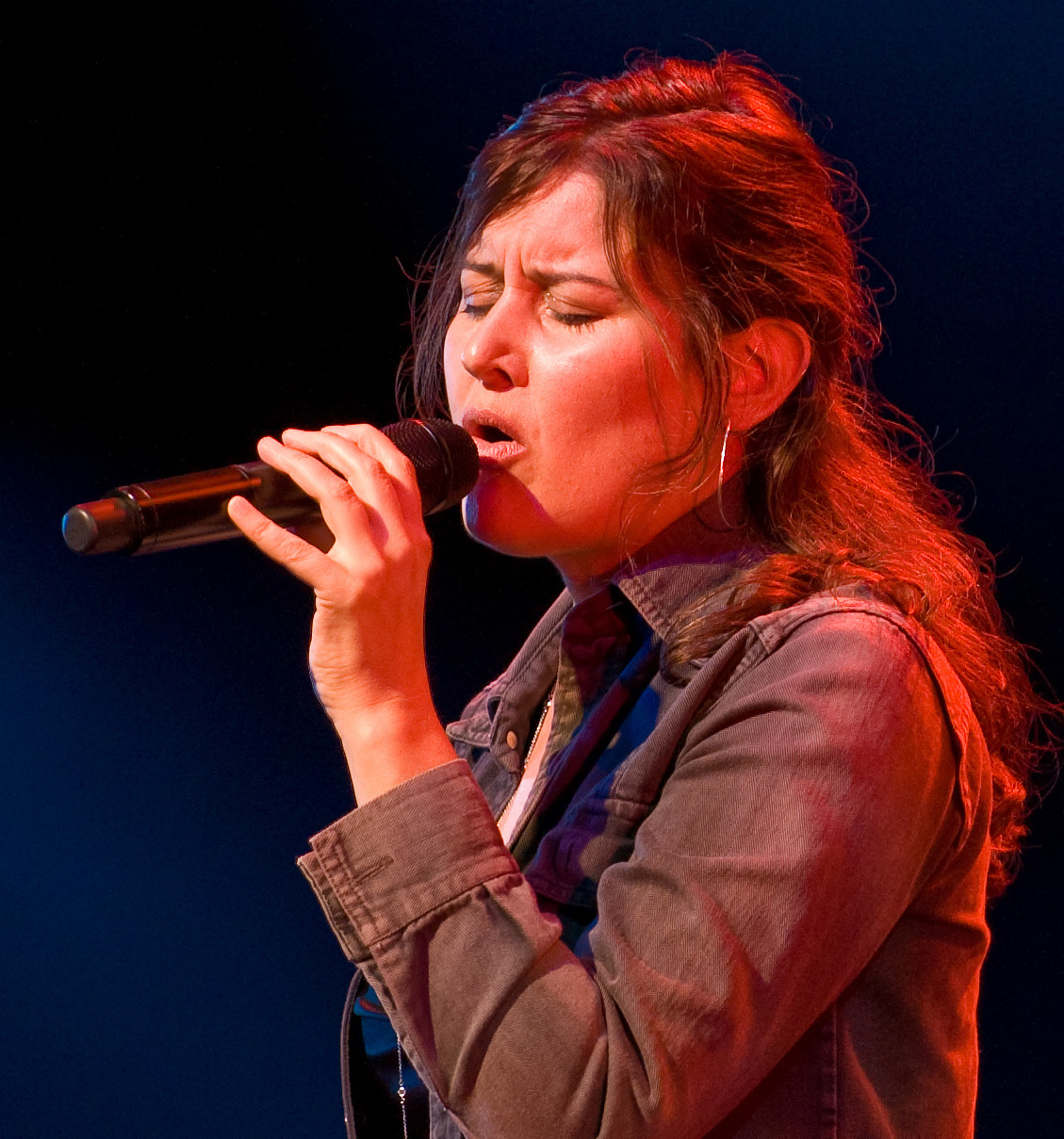
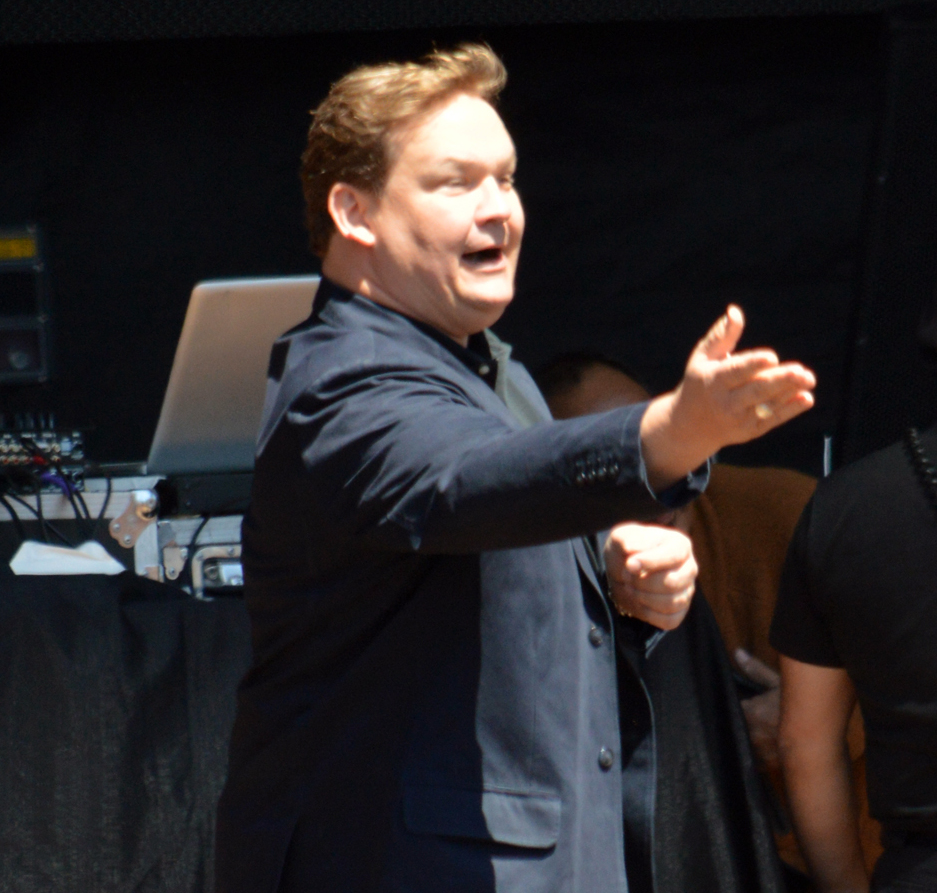
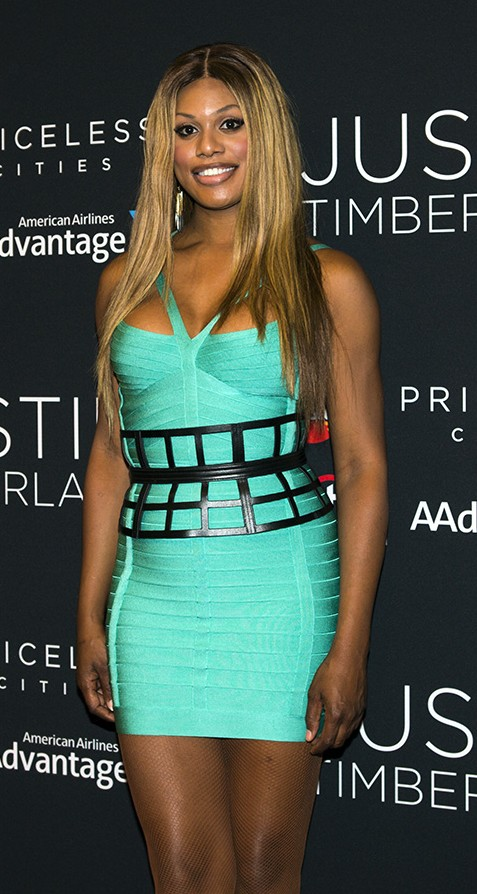
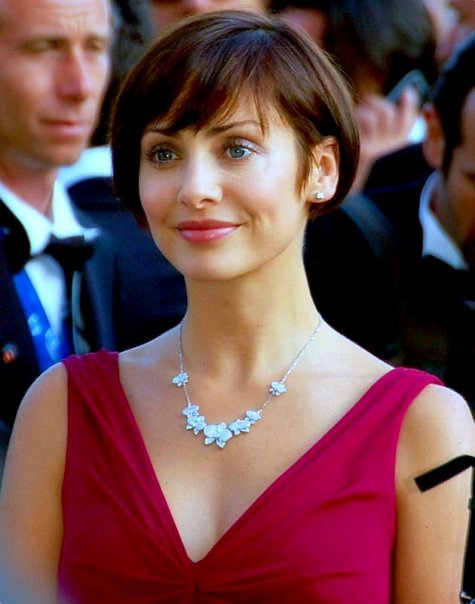
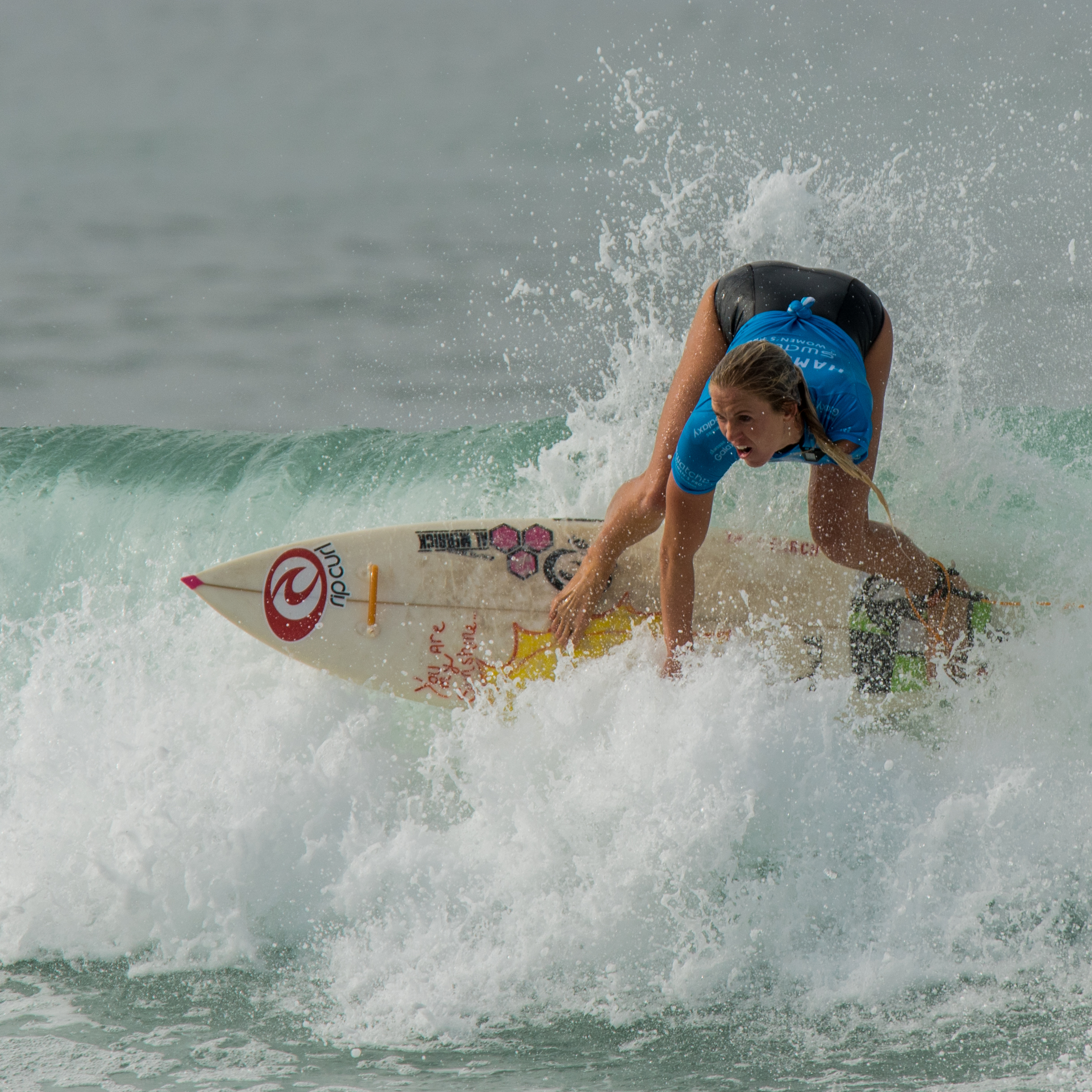
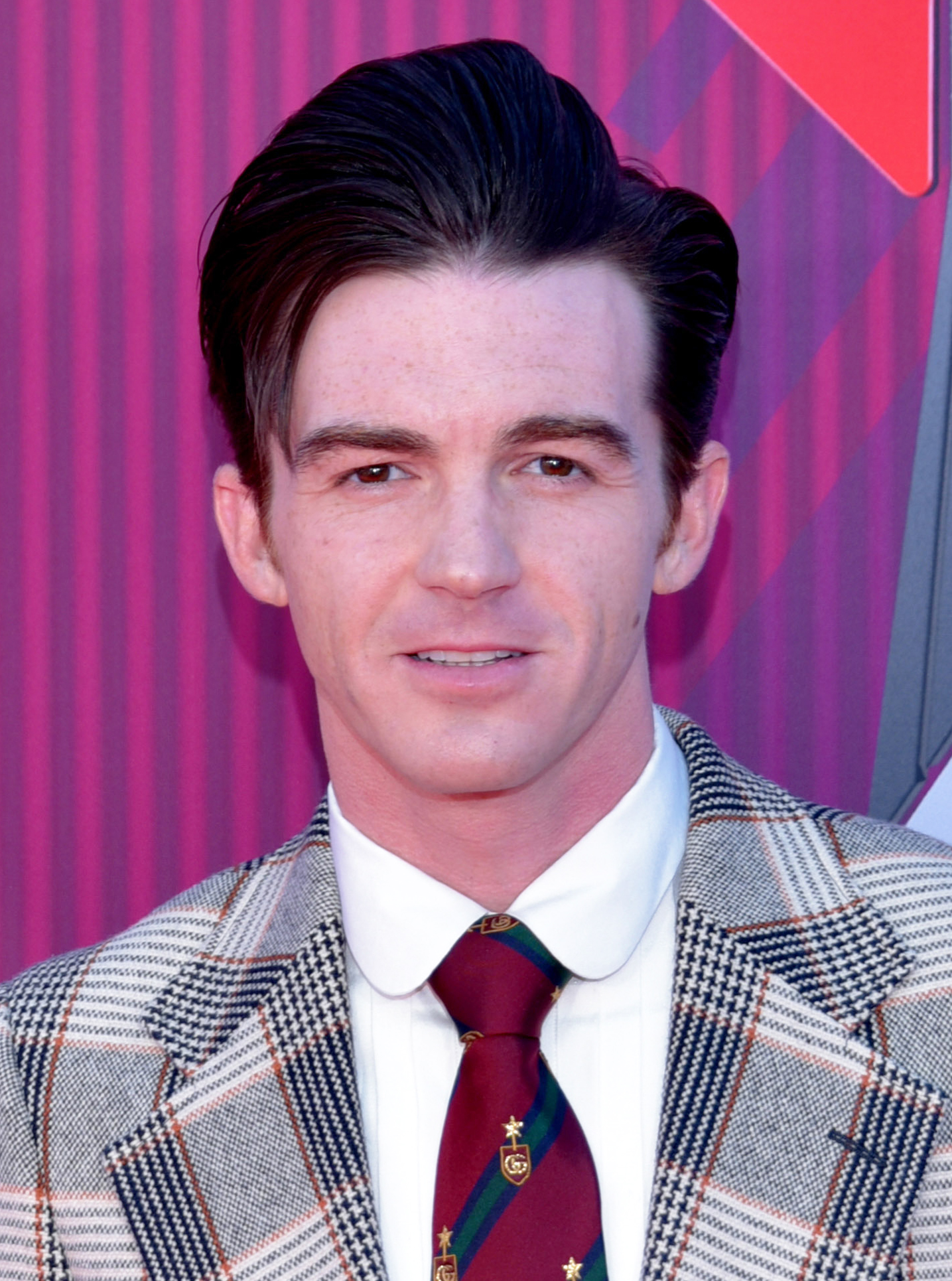
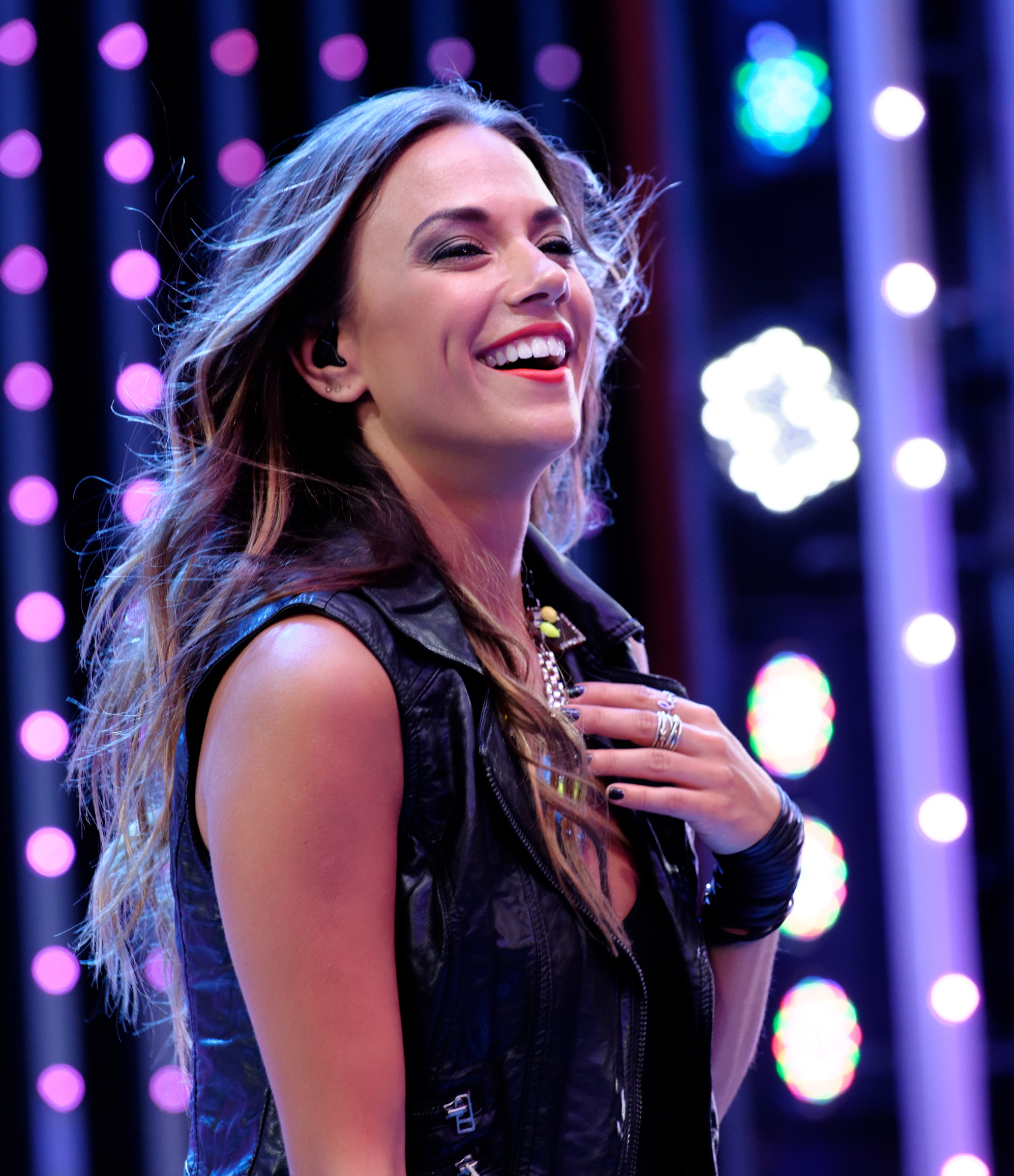
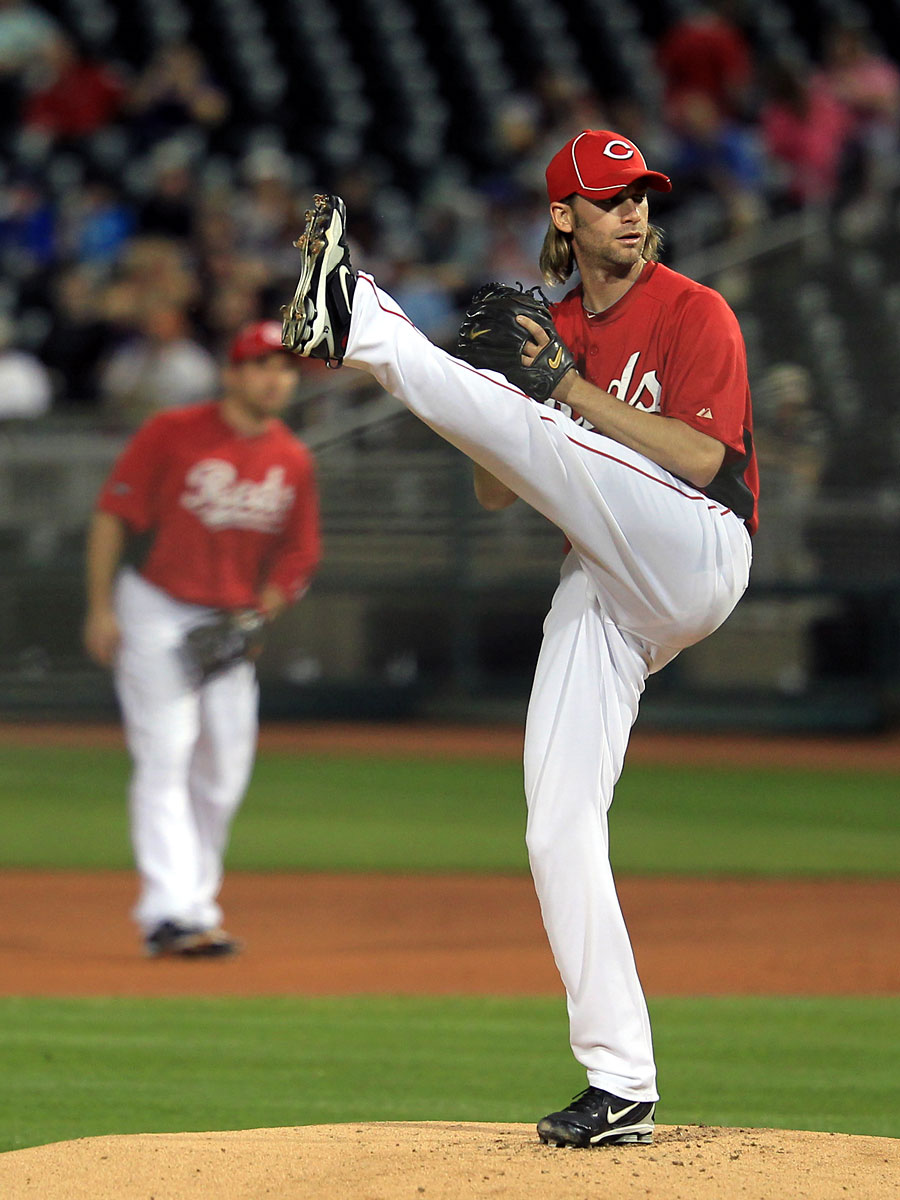
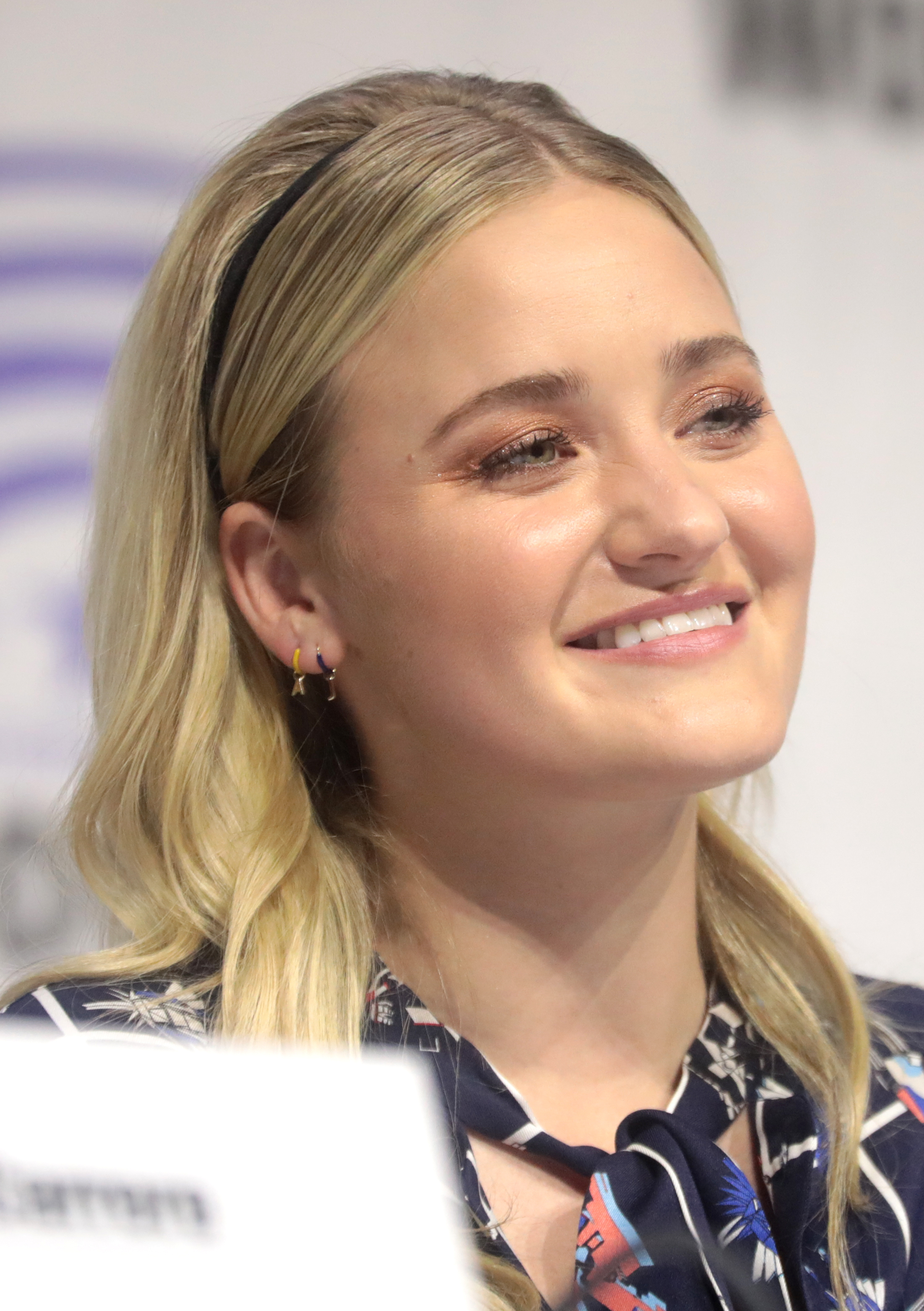
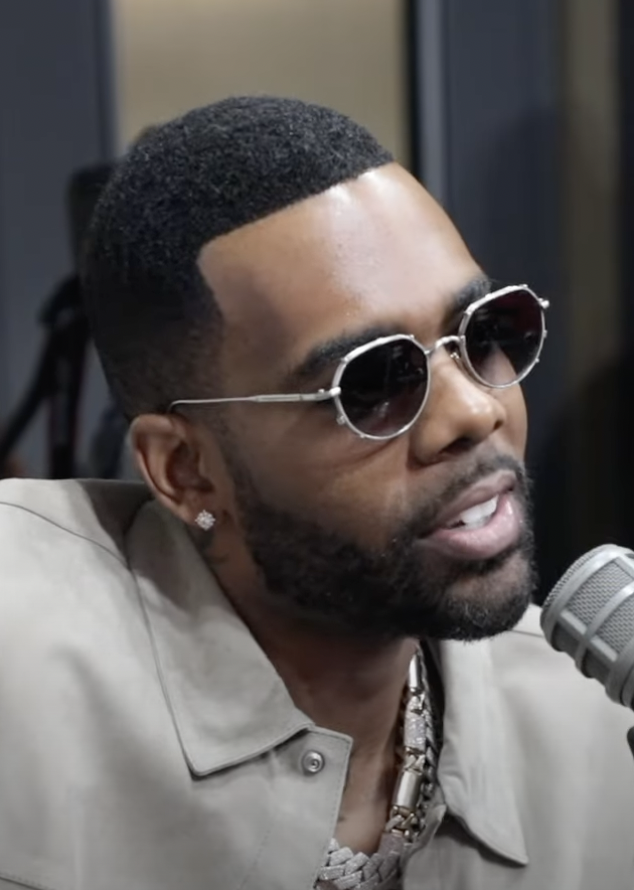
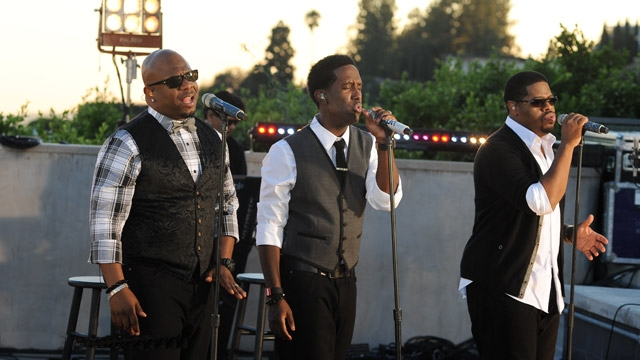
The celebrities who competed in the twelfth season of The Masked Singer, pictured in order of elimination (L-R):
John Elway ("Leaf Sheep"), Yvette Nicole Brown ("Showbird"), Marsai Martin ("Woodpecker"), Paula Cole ("Ship"), Andy Richter ("Dust Bunny"), Laverne Cox ("Chess Piece"), Natalie Imbruglia ("Bluebell"), Bethany Hamilton ("Macaron"), Drake Bell ("Ice King"), Jana Kramer ("Royal Knight"), Bronson Arroyo ("Sherlock Hound"), AJ Michalka ("Strawberry Shortcake"), Mario ("Wasp") and Boyz II Men ("Buffalos")

Not pictured: Kobie Turner ("Goo")

== Episodes ==
=== Week 1 (September 25) - "Season 12 Premiere: Who Can It Be Now?" ===
Guest performance: Panelist Rita Ora performs "Who Can It Be Now?" by Men at Work

Performances on the first episode
#	Stage name	Song	Identity	Result
1	Buffalos	"(I Just) Died in Your Arms" by Cutting Crew	undisclosed	SAFE
2	Woodpecker	"Flowers" by Miley Cyrus	undisclosed	SAFE
3	Leaf Sheep	"I Like It, I Love It" by Tim McGraw	John Elway	OUT
4	Showbird	"Just Fine" by Mary J. Blige	undisclosed	SAFE
5	Ship	"Pompeii" by Bastille	undisclosed	SAFE

=== Week 2 (October 2) - "Footloose Night" ===
Guest performance: Panelist Robin Thicke performs "Footloose" by Kenny Loggins

Performances on the second episode
#	Stage name	Song	Identity	Result
1	Showbird	"Let's Hear It for the Boy" by Deniece Williams	Yvette Nicole Brown	OUT
2	Ship	"Almost Paradise" by Ann Wilson and Mike Reno	undisclosed	SAFE
3	Woodpecker	"Holding Out for a Hero" by Bonnie Tyler	undisclosed	SAFE
4	Buffalos	"Waiting for a Girl Like You" by Foreigner	undisclosed	SAFE

=== Week 3 (October 9) - "Group A Finals: Soundtrack of My Life" ===
Group performance: "High Hopes" by Panic! at the Disco

Performances on the third episode
#	Stage name	Song	Identity	Result
1	Ship	"Because the Night" by Patti Smith Group	undisclosed	SAFE
2	Woodpecker	"Put Your Records On" by Corinne Bailey Rae	Marsai Martin	OUT
3	Buffalos	"Bitter Sweet Symphony" by The Verve	undisclosed	SAFE
Battle Royale
4	Ship	"Go Your Own Way" by Fleetwood Mac	Paula Cole	OUT
4	Buffalos	"Go Your Own Way" by Fleetwood Mac	undisclosed	WIN

- After being unmasked, Cole performed her signature song "I Don't Want to Wait" as her encore performance.

=== Week 4 (October 16) - "Group B Premiere: Sports Night" ===
Guest performance: Panelists Rita Ora and Robin Thicke perform "Rock You Like a Hurricane" by Scorpions

Performances on the fourth episode
#	Stage name	Song	Identity	Result
1	Wasp	"Rock Your Body" by Justin Timberlake	undisclosed	SAFE
2	Chess Piece	"Believe" by Cher	undisclosed	SAFE
3	Bluebell	"We Belong" by Pat Benatar	undisclosed	SAFE
4	Dust Bunny	"Sweet Caroline" by Neil Diamond	Andy Richter	OUT
5	Goo	"Lose Control" by Teddy Swims	undisclosed	SAFE

=== Week 5 (October 23) - "Barbie Night" ===
Guest performance: Panelist Ken Jeong performs "I'm Just Ken" by Ryan Gosling

Performances on the fifth episode
#	Stage name	Song	Identity	Result
1	Bluebell	"Dance the Night" by Dua Lipa	undisclosed	SAFE
2	Goo	"Miss Independent" by Ne-Yo	undisclosed	SAFE
3	Chess Piece	"I'm Every Woman" by Chaka Khan	Laverne Cox	OUT
4	Wasp	"Skyscraper" by Demi Lovato	undisclosed	SAFE

=== Week 6 (November 6) - "Group B Finals: '60s Night" ===
Group performance: "Fun, Fun, Fun" by The Beach Boys

Performances on the sixth episode
#	Stage name	Song	Identity	Result
1	Goo	"The House of the Rising Sun" by The Animals	undisclosed	SAFE
2	Bluebell	"Do You Love Me" by The Contours	Natalie Imbruglia	OUT
3	Wasp	"Ain't No Way" by Aretha Franklin	undisclosed	SAFE
Battle Royale
4	Goo	"I Heard It Through the Grapevine" by Marvin Gaye	undisclosed	KEPT
4	Wasp	"I Heard It Through the Grapevine" by Marvin Gaye	undisclosed	WIN

=== Week 7 (November 13) - "Group C Premiere: Who Are You Fest" ===
Performances on the seventh episode
#	Stage name	Song	Identity	Result
1	Royal Knight	"You and I" by Lady Gaga	undisclosed	SAFE
2	Sherlock Hound	"Under the Bridge" by Red Hot Chili Peppers	undisclosed	SAFE
3	Ice King	"Tonight Tonight" by Hot Chelle Rae	undisclosed	SAFE
4	Macaron	"Call Me Maybe" by Carly Rae Jepsen	Bethany Hamilton	OUT
5	Strawberry Shortcake	"Slow Burn" by Kacey Musgraves	undisclosed	SAFE

=== Week 8 (November 20) - "Miley Cyrus Night" ===
Group performance: "Party in the U.S.A."

Performances on the eighth episode
#	Stage name	Miley Cyrus song	Identity	Result
1	Sherlock Hound	"Used to Be Young"	undisclosed	SAFE
2	Ice King	"Midnight Sky"	Drake Bell	OUT
3	Strawberry Shortcake	"Wrecking Ball"	undisclosed	SAFE
4	Royal Knight	"When I Look at You"	undisclosed	SAFE

=== Week 9 (November 28) - "Group C Finals: A Peanuts Thanksgiving" ===
Guest performance: Panelists Rita Ora and Robin Thicke perform "You Make My Dreams" by Hall & Oates

Performances on the ninth episode
#	Stage name	Song	Identity	Result
1	Strawberry Shortcake	"I Hope You Dance" by Lee Ann Womack	undisclosed	SAFE
2	Royal Knight	"Holiday" by Madonna	Jana Kramer	OUT
3	Sherlock Hound	"Ho Hey" by The Lumineers	undisclosed	SAFE
Battle Royale
4	Sherlock Hound	"Shivers" by Ed Sheeran	Bronson Arroyo	OUT
4	Strawberry Shortcake	"Shivers" by Ed Sheeran	undisclosed	WIN

=== Week 10 (December 4) - "Quarter Finals: Merging of the Masks" ===
Performances on the tenth episode
#	Stage name	Song	Result	
1	Wasp	"Standing Next to You" by Jungkook	SAFE	
2	Goo	"Iris" by Goo Goo Dolls	RISK	
3	Strawberry Shortcake	"Closer" by Tegan and Sara	RISK	
4	Buffalos	"You're Still the One" by Shania Twain	SAFE	
Smackdown			Identity	Result
5	Goo	"Hold On, I'm Comin'" by Sam & Dave	Kobie Turner	OUT
5	Strawberry Shortcake	"Scars to Your Beautiful" by Alessia Cara	undisclosed	SAFE

=== Week 11 (December 11) - "Semi-Finals: The Final Three" ===
Group performance: "Some Nights" by Fun

Performances on the eleventh episode
#	Stage name	Song	Result	
1	Strawberry Shortcake	"Lose You to Love Me" by Selena Gomez	RISK	
2	Buffalos	"Africa" by Toto	RISK	
3	Wasp	"Beautiful Things" by Benson Boone	WIN	
Smack Royale			Identity	Result
4	Strawberry Shortcake	"Counting Stars" by OneRepublic	AJ Michalka	OUT
4	Buffalos	"Counting Stars" by OneRepublic	undisclosed	SAFE

- After being unmasked, Michalka performed her signature song "Potential Breakup Song" as her encore performance.

=== Week 12 (December 18) - "Finale: A Champion Is Crowned" ===
Guest performance: Nick Lachey performs "It's the Most Wonderful Time of the Year" by Andy Williams

Performances on the twelfth episode
#	Stage name	Song	Identity	Result
1	Wasp	"When I Was Your Man" by Bruno Mars	Mario	RUNNER-UP
1	Wasp	"I'm Your Baby Tonight" by Whitney Houston	Mario	RUNNER-UP
2	Buffalos	"Somebody That I Used to Know" by Gotye	Boyz II Men	WINNERS
2	Buffalos	"Too Good at Goodbyes" by Sam Smith	Boyz II Men	WINNERS

- After being unmasked, Mario performed his signature song "Let Me Love You" as his encore performance, and Boyz II Men performed their signature song "Motownphilly".

== Ratings ==
Viewership and ratings per episode of The Masked Singer (American TV series) season 12
No.	Title	Air date	Timeslot (ET)	Rating/share (18–49)	Viewers (millions)	Ref.
1	"Season 12 Premiere: Who Can It Be Now?"	September 25, 2024	Wednesday 8:00 p.m.	0.5/6	2.90	
2	"Footloose Night"	October 2, 2024	Wednesday 8:00 p.m.	0.4/5	2.86	
3	"Group A Finals: Soundtrack of My Life"	October 9, 2024	Wednesday 8:00 p.m.	0.4/4	2.60	
4	"Group B Premiere: Sports Night"	October 16, 2024	Wednesday 8:00 p.m.	0.4/5	2.81	
5	"Barbie Night"	October 23, 2024	Wednesday 8:00 p.m.	0.3/4	2.77	
6	"Group B Finals: '60s Night"	November 6, 2024	Wednesday 8:00 p.m.	0.4/5	2.91	
7	"Group C Premiere: Who Are You Fest"	November 13, 2024	Wednesday 8:00 p.m.	0.4/5	2.98	
8	"Miley Cyrus Night"	November 20, 2024	Wednesday 8:00 p.m.	0.3/4	2.69	
9	"Group C Finals: A Peanuts Thanksgiving"	November 28, 2024	Thursday 8:00 p.m.	1.2/11	5.16	
10	"Quarter Finals: Merging of the Masks"	December 4, 2024	Wednesday 8:00 p.m.	0.3/5	2.76	
11	"Semi-Finals: The Final Three"	December 11, 2024	Wednesday 8:00 p.m.	0.4/5	3.12	
12	"Finale: A Champion Is Crowned"	December 18, 2024	Wednesday 8:00 p.m.	0.4/5	3.16	
