= California Surf Museum =

Museum in Oceanside, California, US

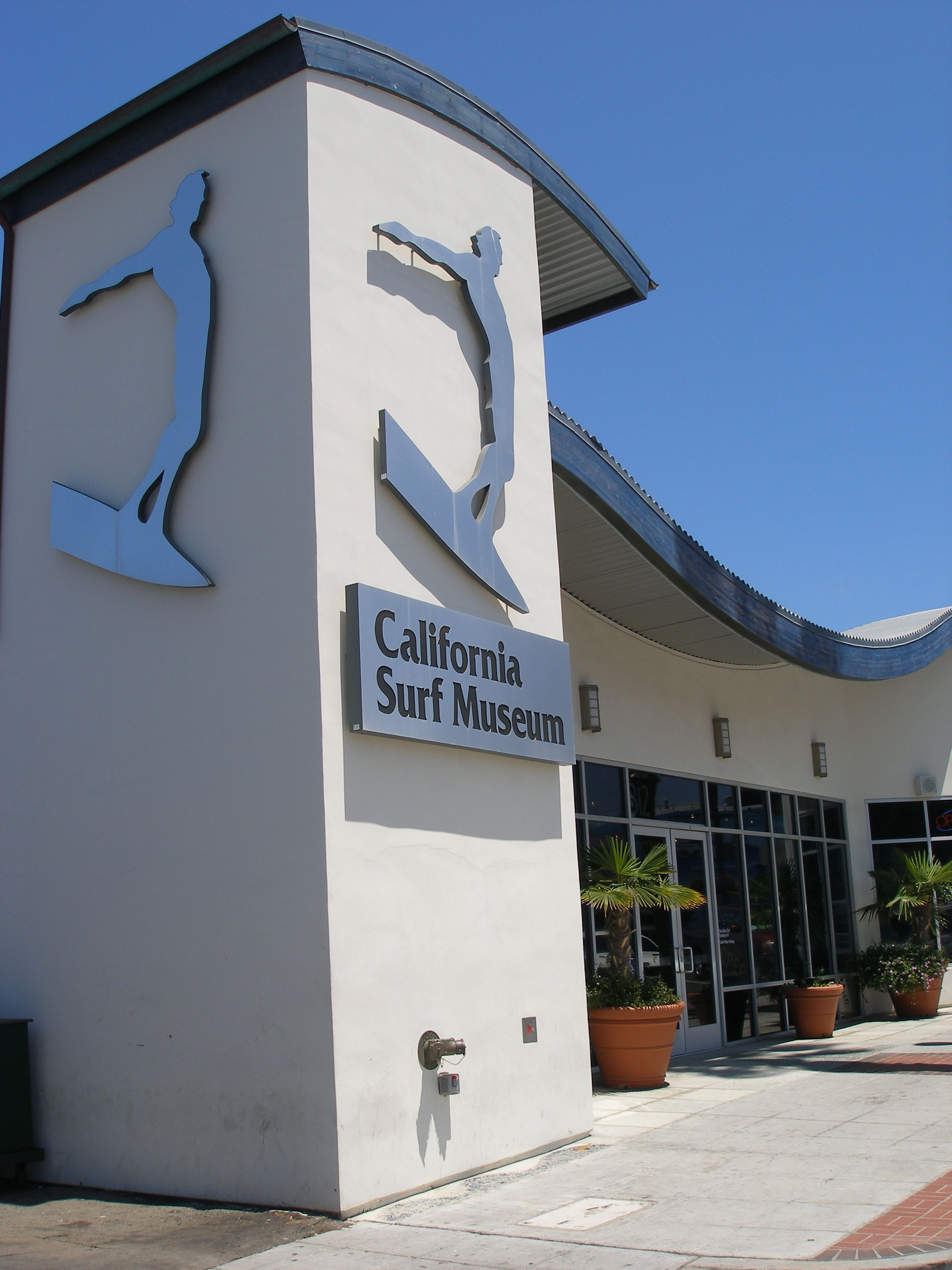
- Established: 1986
- Location: 312 Pier View Way, Oceanside, California
- Coordinates: 33.1965°N 117.3803°W
- Website: www.surfmuseum.org

The California Surf Museum is a museum in Oceanside, California, dedicated to surfing. It archives and displays surfboards as well as surf-related art, memorabilia, equipment, photographs, magazines, and videos. Founded in 1986 in Encinitas, California, the museum subsequently moved to Pacific Beach, before settling in Oceanside in 1991. Its current location (the third in Oceanside) is a 5,100-square-foot (470 m^{2}) building in downtown Oceanside, close to the Oceanside Pier.

The California Surf Museum's permanent time line of surfboards includes wooden boards from the early 1900s to today's modern boards. It has rotating exhibits and is visited by an estimated 20,000 people annually. The museum hosts a number of annual events, including a fundraising gala, three-day Surf Film Festival, "Legends Day", book signings, and concerts. The California Surf Museum is a 501(c)(3) non-profit organization.

The museum features a display of many unique pieces of surfing memorabilia, including a display dedicated to Bethany Hamilton, who lost her arm in a shark attack off the coast of Hawaii. The display includes the board that Hamilton was riding at the time with a large piece missing where the shark bit off Hamilton's arm, as well as the bathing suit she was wearing at the time, a gift from ocean photographer Aaron Chang.

== Gallery ==
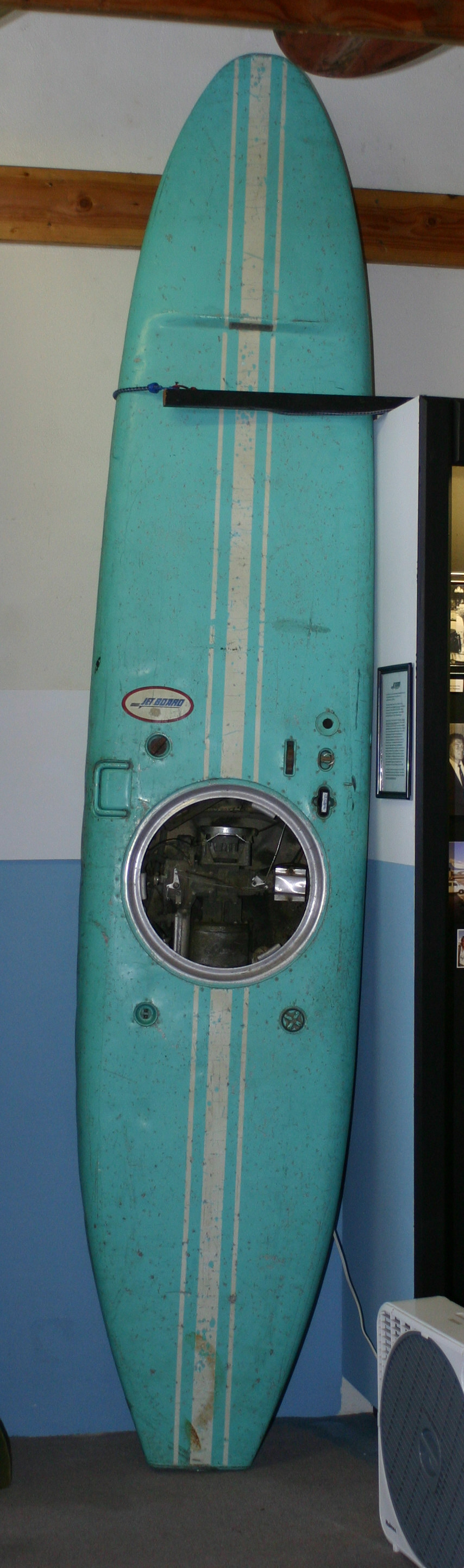
A Jetboard, motorized surfboard

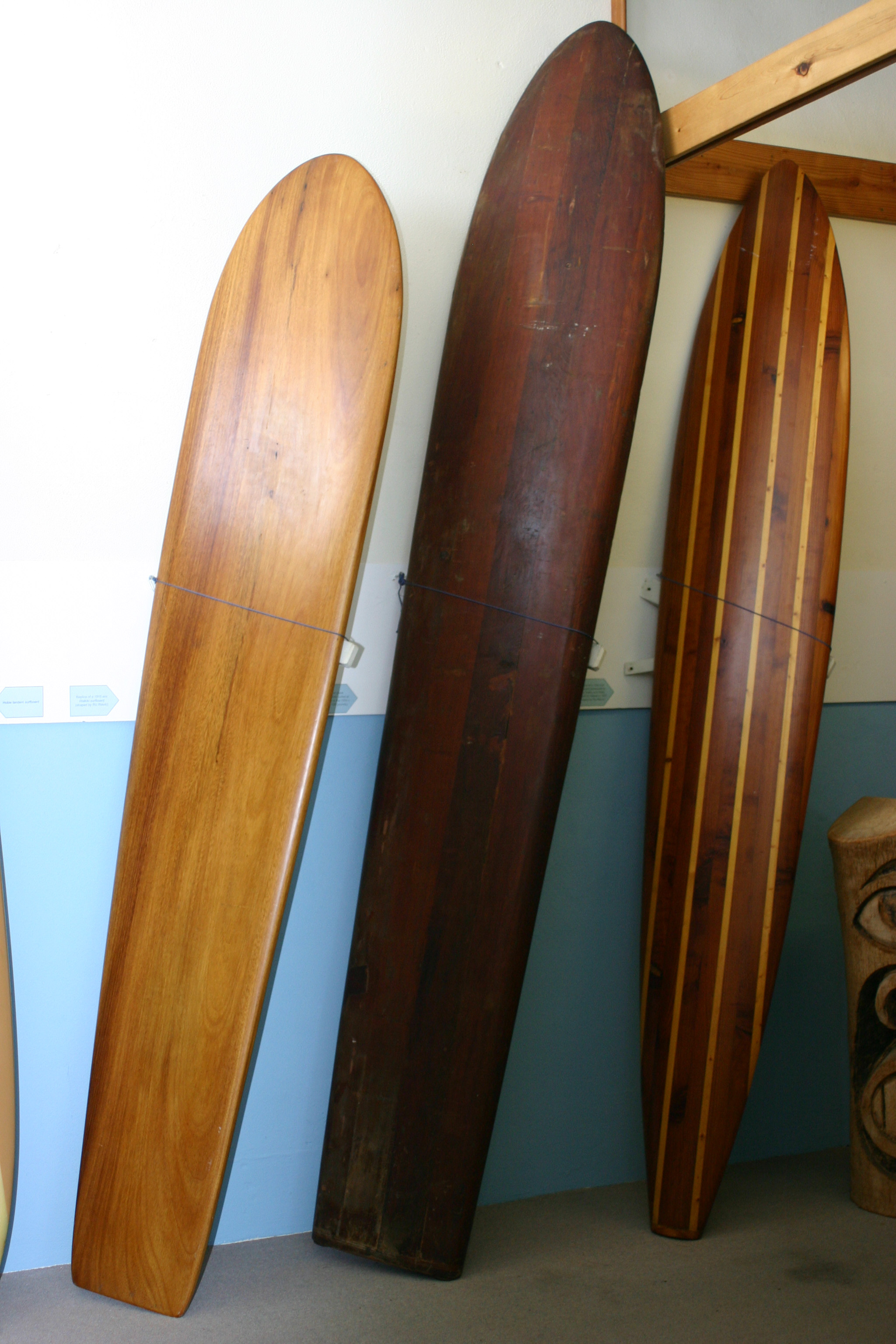
Images of various vintage and reproduction longboards

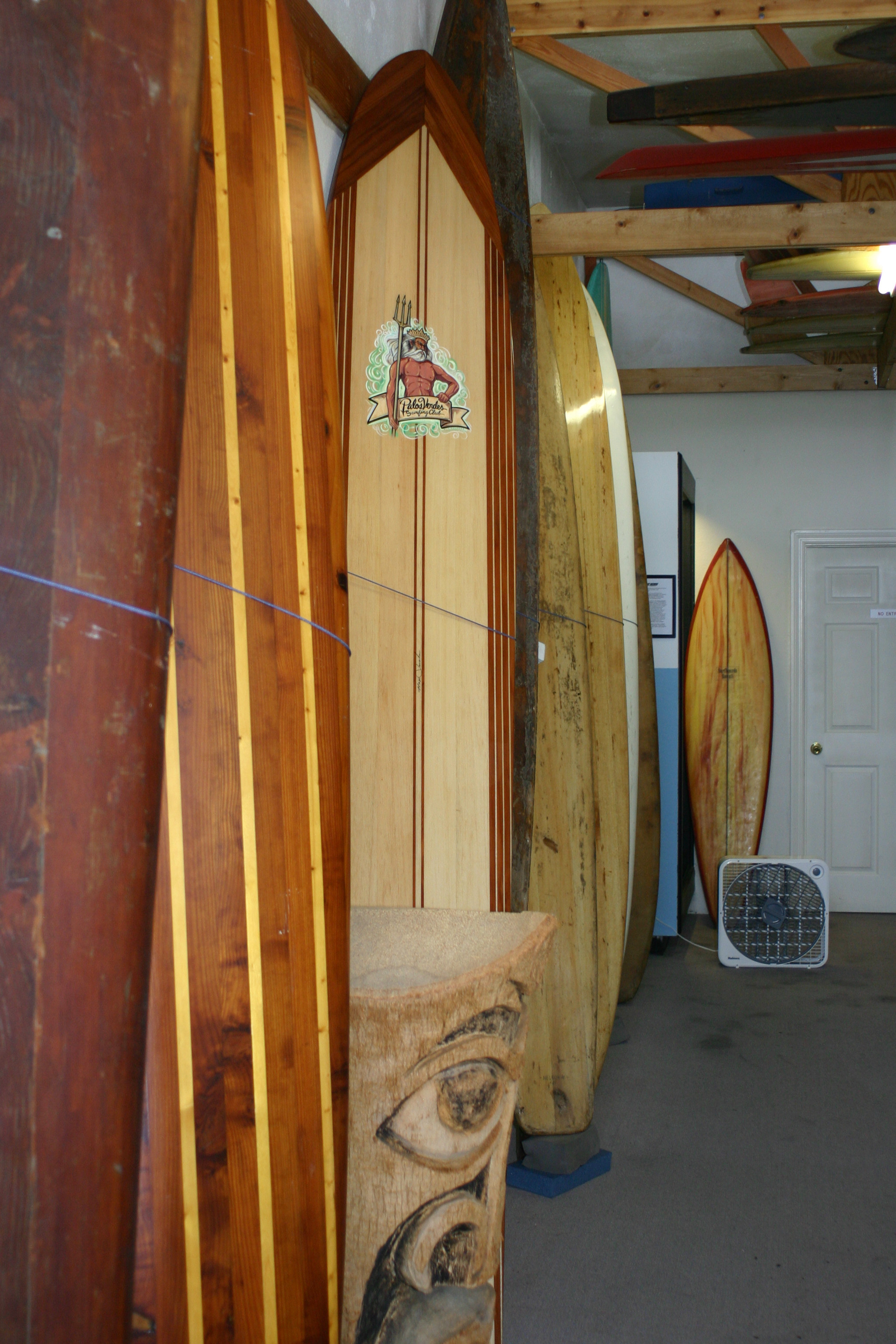
Images of various vintage and reproduction longboards
