= Bethany Hamilton =

American surfer (born 1990)

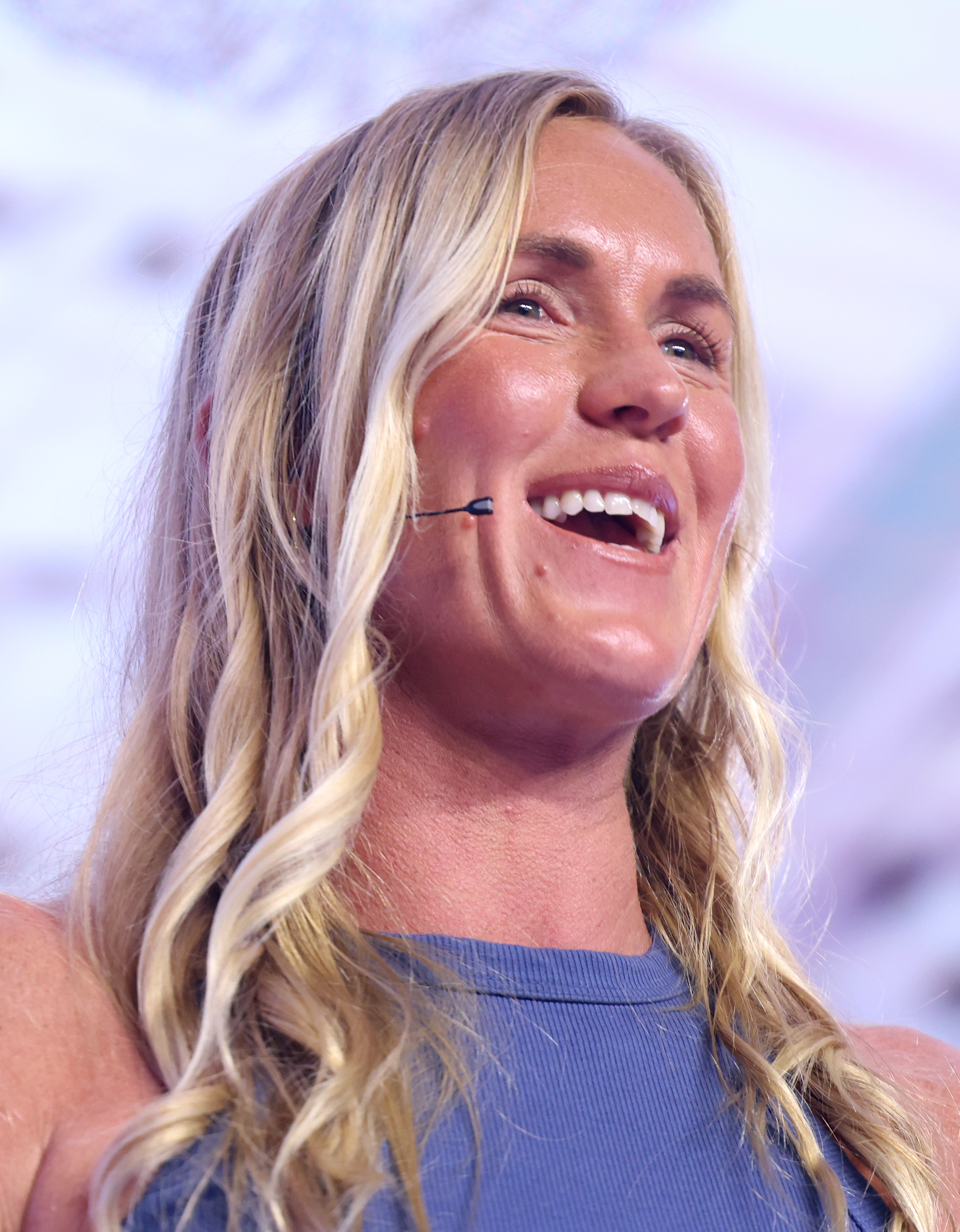
- Hamilton in 2025
- Born: Bethany Meilani Hamilton; February 8, 1990 (age 36); Lihue, Hawaii, U.S.
- Spouse: Adam Dirks (m. 2013)
- Children: 4
- Surfing career
- Height: 5 ft 11 in (180 cm)
- Weight: 157 lb (71 kg)
- Website: bethanyhamilton.com
- Sport: Surfing
- Best year: 2016
- Major achievements: ESPY Award (2004); NSSA National Helping Kids Champion (2005); 2nd place, ASP World Junior Championships (2008)

Surfing specifications
- Stance: Goofy

Bethany Meilani Hamilton (born February 8, 1990) is an American professional surfer and writer. On October 31, 2003, she survived a shark attack in which her left arm was bitten off; ultimately, she returned to professional surfing and wrote about her experiences in the 2004 autobiography, Soul Surfer: A True Story of Faith, Family, and Fighting to Get Back on the Board. The book was adapted into the 2011 feature film, Soul Surfer. Hamilton attributes her strength to her Christian faith.

Hamilton is also the subject of a 2018 documentary, Bethany Hamilton: Unstoppable, in which she discusses how marriage and motherhood have affected her professional surfing career.

== Early life ==
Hamilton was born on February 8, 1990, to Tom and Cheri Hamilton in Lihue, Hawaii. She has two older brothers, Noah and Timothy. After learning how to surf at the age of three, Hamilton began surfing competitively at the age of eight and gained her first sponsorship by age 10. Hamilton was home-schooled from sixth grade through high school by her mother, a housewife, while her father was a waiter at a town café.

== Shark attack and recovery ==
On October 31, 2003, 13-year-old Hamilton went for a morning surf along Tunnels Beach, Kauaʻi, with her best friend Alana Blanchard and Alana's dad and brother. While Hamilton was lying on her surfboard stomach-down, a 14-foot-long (4.3 m) tiger shark attacked her. It swiftly bit off Hamilton's left arm, which was dangling in the water, just below the shoulder. The Blanchards helped paddle Hamilton back to shore, then Alana's father fashioned a tourniquet out of a rash guard and wrapped it around the stump of her arm. Hamilton was rushed to Wilcox Medical Center. By the time she arrived there, Hamilton had lost over 60% of her blood and was in hypovolemic shock. Hamilton's father, who was scheduled to have knee surgery that same morning, was already there, but she took his place in the operating room with the same doctor.

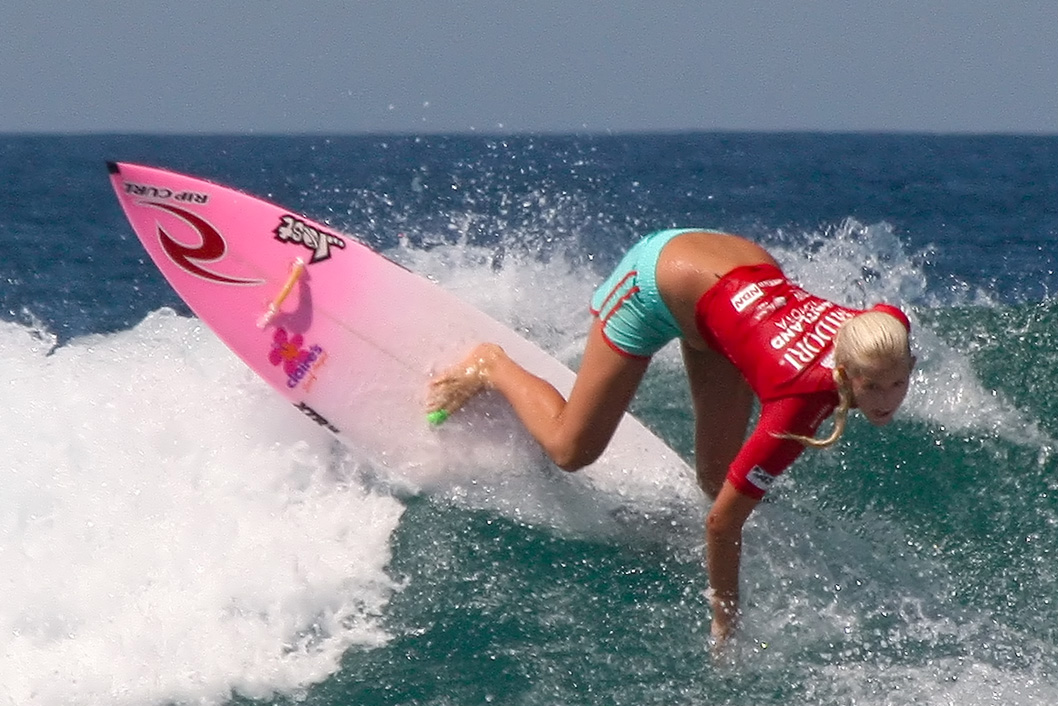
Hamilton surfing in March 2007

When the news of the shark attack broke, a family of fishermen led by Ralph Young presented to investigators photos of a 14-foot-long (4.3 m) tiger shark they had caught and killed about one mile from the attack site. When measurements of its mouth were compared with those of Hamilton's broken board, it matched. In late 2004, police officially confirmed that it was the same one that had attacked her.

Despite the trauma of the incident, Hamilton was determined to return to surfing and did so a month later.

Initially, Hamilton adopted a custom-made board that was longer and slightly thicker than standard and had a handle for her right arm, making it easier to paddle, and Hamilton learned to kick more to make up for the loss of her left arm. After Hamilton taught herself to surf with one arm, she returned to surfing on November 26, 2003, just 26 days after the attack, and entered her first major competition on January 10, 2004. Hamilton now uses standard competitive performance short-boards. The shark-bitten surfboard that she was riding during the attack, as well as the swimsuit she was wearing, originally a gift from ocean photographer Aaron Chang, are on display at the California Surf Museum in Oceanside, California.

== Media ==
Since the attack, Hamilton has appeared as a guest on numerous television shows. Her manager, Roy "Dutch" Hofstetter, who went on to produce the film Soul Surfer, managed Hamilton's rise through the media from shark attack victim to inspirational role model. The television shows she has appeared on include The Amazing Race, The Biggest Loser, 20/20, Good Morning America, Inside Edition, The Oprah Winfrey Show, The Ellen DeGeneres Show, The Today Show, The Tonight Show and Dude Perfect, as well as in the magazines People, Time, and American Girl. Additionally, Hamilton was the cover story in the first issue of NiNe magazine.

Hamilton has participated in multiple public speaking events and is "motivating audiences worldwide to live their life with more tenacity, courage, and faith".

In 2004, Hamilton won the ESPY Award for Best Comeback Athlete and also received the Courage Teen Choice Award. That same year, MTV Books published Hamilton's book, Soul Surfer: A True Story of Faith, Family, and Fighting to Get Back on the Board, which describes her ordeal. Hamilton's story is also told in the 2007 short subject documentary film Heart of a Soul Surfer. Described as a "faith-based documentary", the film addresses her devout Christianity and the courage and faith in Jesus in the aftermath of the shark attack and follows her quest for spiritual meaning.

In 2009, Hamilton was a contestant on Are You Smarter Than a Fifth Grader? and won $25,000. In 2010, she appeared on an episode of ABC's Extreme Makeover: Home Edition.

In 2011, Hamilton appeared in a video for the Christian organization I Am Second, telling of her struggle after the shark attack and how she trusted in God to get her through it. That same year, a feature film Soul Surfer, based on her 2004 book, was released in theaters. Hamilton was portrayed by AnnaSophia Robb, and performed all the one-armed surfing stunts in the film.

Hamilton also appeared on the TLC series 19 Kids and Counting the same year, in the episode titled "Duggars Under the Sea", when the Duggar family visited her in Atlanta, Georgia.

Hamilton plays herself in the film Dolphin Tale 2, which revolves around the baby dolphin Hope's story.

Hamilton was featured as a contestant on the 2013 Fox celebrity diving special Stars in Danger: The High Dive. She and her husband, Adam Dirks, competed as a team on the 25th season of The Amazing Race, finishing in third place. It premiered in 2014 on CBS.

Bethany Hamilton: Unstoppable is set to tell the story of Hamilton's transition from childhood to motherhood. "From chasing her toddler to chasing the biggest waves. Bethany is continuously rewriting the rules on being a fearless athlete and brings a new meaning to the phrase, 'Surf Like a Girl'".

Hamilton was featured in a short film by Rip Curl titled Master and Apprentice alongside young female surfer Erin Brooks.

In 2024, Hamilton competed in season twelve of The Masked Singer as "Macaron" with Willie Robertson (who competed in season six as "Mallard") serving as her Mask Ambassador. Because of her one arm, the left arm of the "Macaron" costume was stationary. She was eliminated in the "Group C Premiere", making her the first amputee to compete on the show.

== Personal life ==
In early 2012, Hamilton met youth minister Adam Dirks through mutual friends. They became engaged in 2013. The couple married on August 18, 2013, at an estate on Kauaʻi's north shore, near where Hamilton grew up. They have four children (three sons and a daughter). Their marriage is featured throughout her documentary, Bethany Hamilton: Unstoppable. Along with being a professional surfer, Hamilton now offers mentorship classes on faith, healing, personal health, and relationships. Hamilton is a Christian.

Hamilton was the keynote speaker of the March for Life, an annual pro-life rally and march in Washington, D.C., in 2025.

== Books ==
Hamilton has published nine books, and her mom has also published one about her story.

Book title	Authors	Year published	Plot	Refs.
Soul Surfer: A True Story of Faith, Family, and Fighting to Get Back on the Board	Bethany Hamilton, Rick Bundschuh and Sheryl Berk	2004	Autobiography detailing the time leading up to the shark attack, how she recovered, dealt with media attention, and how she ultimately got back on the board and returned to competition	
Devotions for the Soul Surfer	Bethany Hamilton	2006, reprinted in 2011	Christian devotional book for young girls	
Rise Above: A 90-day Devotional	Bethany Hamilton	2007	Christian devotional for young girls discussing both "hot and cool topics that every young girl faces"	
Ask Bethany: FAQs: Surfing, Faith, and Friends	Bethany Hamilton	2007	Bethany answers questions discussing faith and how it has helped her throughout her life	
Raising a Soul Surfer: One Family's Epic Tale	Cheri Hamilton / Rick Bundschuh	2011	This book was written by Hamilton's Mom and provides the story of Bethany's shark attack through the perspective of her parents.	
Body and Soul: A Girl's Guide to a Fit, Fun, and Fabulous Life	Bethany Hamilton, Dustin Dillberg	2014	Provides readers with guidelines to become their healthiest self and practice a fit lifestyle. Includes workouts, healthy recipes, and tips for coping with stress	
Ask Bethany: Bethany Answers Over 200 Questions from Girls Like You	Bethany Hamilton, Doris Rikkers	2014, reprinted 2016	Bethany answers fan questions about "a wide variety of topics about her life and faith"	
Be Unstoppable: The Art of Never Giving Up	Bethany Hamilton	2018	In this book Bethany "inspires readers to be bold, enjoy life, and take risk of trusting God each day. Includes photos, inspiration quotes, and life lessons from Hamilton	
Unstoppable Me	Bethany Hamilton, Adam Dirks, illustrated by Gill Guile	2018	Children's book based on Bethany's story. It follows Makana the lion who enjoys surfing but loses her nerve after wiping out on the water. With the help of her friends she rediscovers her love for surfing.	
Surfing Past Fear	Bethany Hamilton, BRAVE BOOKS, illustrated by Martin Moròn	2022	Following an arm fracture, fellow beachgoers help Olivia overcome her concerns.	

== Outreach programs ==
Hamilton is involved in numerous charitable efforts, including her own foundation, Friends of Bethany, which reaches out to amputees and youth, encouraging them to overcome difficulties by offering hope through Jesus Christ. Using her platform as a professional athlete to promote living a fit and healthy lifestyle, Hamilton authored the book Body and Soul in 2014. In 2019, a surf documentary was made about her, Bethany Hamilton: Unstoppable, which was accompanied by a photo book and a children's book.

Within the Friends of Bethany Foundation, there are four different programs:

- Beautifully Flawed: retreat designed for young women ages 14–25 who have experienced traumatic limb loss. Six events hosted annually through this program which include: guests speakers, practical health and wellness tips which specifically account for limb loss, postural training, and surf lessons.
- Shine Forth: Night filled with stories and inspiration to overcome, free community event to gather together and share comeback stories. Bethany also does a book signing at this event, which is hosted annually.
- Anchored in Love: Conference for girls and young women ages 12 and up, one day event designed to help girls and young women discover their true beauty, purpose, and worth. Event is held annually in San Diego and features several guest speakers.
- The Forge: Men's retreat where young male amputees come and focus on faith, fitness, and healthy living. This program is run by Bethany, her husband, and friend/mentor Mike Coots.

== Surfing career ==
Placings in surf competitions
Year	Event	Place	Country
1998	Rell Sunn Menehune	1st	(Australia)
2002	Open Women's Division of the NSSA	1st	(United States)
2004	NSSA National Competition	1st	(Australia)
2005	NSSA National Competition	1st	(United States)
2006	NSSA National Championship: 18-and-under Finalist	5th	(United States)
2006	Hawaii Team Highlights	4th 3rd	(United States)
2007	NSSA Regionals	1st	(United States)
2007	T & C Pipeline Women's Pro	1st	(United States)
2008	US Open of Surfing—Huntington Beach, California	5th	(United States)
2008	Roxy Pro Surf Festival—Phillip Island	3rd	(Australia)
2008	ASP's World Qualifying Series	14th	—N/a
2009	Rio Surf International in Rio de Janeiro	3rd	(Brazil)
2009	WSL's World Qualifying Series	14th	(Peru)
2009	Billabong ASP World Junior Championship	2nd	(Australia)
2009	World Cup Sunset Beach	13th	(United States)
2010	Rip Curl Pro Portugal	9th	(Portugal)
2011	Rip Curl Women's Pro Bells Beach	13th	(Australia)
2012	Telstra Drug Aware Pro	9th	(Australia)
2012	Rip Curl Cup Padang Padang	—N/a	(Indonesia)
2012	Swatch Girl's Pro France	37th	(France)
2013	Supergirl Pro	9th	(United States)
2014	Hurley Australian Open	37th	(Australia)
2014	Surf 'n' Sea Pipeline Women's Pro	1st	(United States)
2015	Swatch Women's Pro	13th	(United States)
2016	Fiji Women's Pro	3rd	(Fiji)
2016	Swatch Women's Pro	13th	(United States)
2017	Wahine Pipe Pro	17th	(United States)
2017	Outerknown Fiji Women's Pro	9th	(Fiji)
2018	Surf Ranch Pro–Lemoore, CA	13th	(United States)
2018	Beachwaver Maui Pro	13th	(United States)
2020	Sydney Surf Pro	17th	(Australia)
2021	Nissan Super Girl Surf Pro	33rd	(United States)
2022	HIC Pipe Pro	13th	(United States)
2022	Billabong Pro Pipeline	9th	(United States)
2022	Priority Destinations Pro	4th	(United States)

=== World Surf League boycott ===
In February 2023, Hamilton announced that she would boycott all World Surf League events following their decision to allow transgender women to compete in the female category provided they maintain a testosterone level below 5nmol/L for 12 months prior. Hamilton questioned whether hormone levels were a fair and accurate assessment of sex, stating that transgender athletes should have a separate division created for them. Stating that transgender women have a biological advantage over women, she said, "We are seeing glimpses of male-bodied dominance in women's sports like running, swimming and others." Hamilton said that she believes that many of the women currently on tour agree with her but are too afraid of being ostracized to speak out. Hamilton's stance received support from some but was criticized by others.

It was later reported that Hamilton's public statements led to her no longer working with longtime sponsor Rip Curl, despite having signed a five-year contract in 2022. Following Rip Curl's inclusion of transgender surfer Sasha Lowerson in a January 2024 campaign, the company faced online backlash and a boycott, including some commentators stating that the company had "replaced" Hamilton with Lowerson. Rip Curl's parent company, KMD Brands, has since reported over 80 million in New Zealand dollars in losses and closed 21 stores worldwide, which some attribute to the boycott, comparing the situation to the Bud Light boycott.

== Filmography ==
=== Film ===
Year	Title	Role	Notes
2014	Dolphin Tale 2	Herself	
2018	Bethany Hamilton: Unstoppable	Herself	Documentary

=== Television ===
Year	Title	Role	Notes
2013	Stars in Danger: The High Dive	Herself	Contestant
2014	The Amazing Race	Herself	Season 25 contestant
2024	The Masked Singer	Herself / Macaron	Season 12 contestant
