= Soul Surfer (film) =

2011 film by Sean McNamara

- Theatrical release poster
- Directed by: Sean McNamara
- Screenplay by: Sean McNamara; Deborah Schwartz; Douglas Schwartz; Michael Berk
- Story by: Sean McNamara; Deborah Schwartz; Douglas Schwartz; Michael Berk; Matt Allen; Caleb Wilson; Brad Gann
- Based on: Soul Surfer by; Bethany Hamilton; Sheryl Berk; Rick Bundschuh
- Produced by: David Zelon; Douglas Schwartz; Kyle Anderson; Dutch Hofstetter; David Brookwell; Sean McNamara
- Starring: AnnaSophia Robb; Helen Hunt; Dennis Quaid; Lorraine Nicholson; Carrie Underwood
- Cinematography: John R. Leonetti
- Edited by: Jeff Canavan
- Music by: Marco Beltrami
- Production companies: Mandalay Vision; Brookwell McNamara Entertainment; Enticing Entertainment; Island Film Group; Life's A Beach Entertainment
- Distributed by: TriStar Pictures & Affirm Films (through Sony Pictures Releasing); FilmDistrict
- Release date: April 8, 2011
- Running time: 106 minutes
- Country: United States
- Language: English
- Budget: $18 million
- Box office: $47.1 million

Soul Surfer is a 2011 American biographical sports drama film directed by Sean McNamara and based on the 2004 book of the same name by Bethany Hamilton, Sheryl Berk, and Rick Bundschuh about Hamilton's life as a surfer after losing her left arm from a shark attack and her subsequent recovery. The film stars AnnaSophia Robb, Helen Hunt, Dennis Quaid, and Lorraine Nicholson with Carrie Underwood, Kevin Sorbo, Sonya Balmores, Branscombe Richmond, and Craig T. Nelson. Filming took place in Hawaii in early 2010, with additional filming taking place in Tahiti in August 2010.

Released in theaters on April 8, 2011 in the United States and Canada by a partnership between FilmDistrict and TriStar Pictures, Soul Surfer became a commercial success, earning $47.1 million against its $18 million budget, but received mixed reviews from critics; some complimented the visuals, performances (particularly from Robb) and its message, while others panned the film for being melodramatic and heavy-handed.

== Plot ==
In 2003, 13-year-old Bethany Hamilton lives in Kauai, Hawaii with her parents Tom and Cheri and two older brothers Noah and Timmy. All are surfers, Bethany and her best friend Alana Blanchard having grown up with a passion for the sport and competed together most of their childhood.

When Bethany and Alana place first and third respectively at a competition, they become sponsored by Rip Curl who offers them a photo shoot. Both abandon a church mission trip to Mexico to train for the next contest, upsetting their youth leader Sarah Hill. On Halloween, Tom goes to the hospital for knee surgery, while the girls go surfing with Alana's father Holt and brother Byron. While Bethany is distracted, a tiger shark appears and severs her left arm below the shoulder. She is taken to the hospital for treatment, where she replaces her father in the operating room. Bethany miraculously survives, despite having lost over sixty percent of her blood supply.

The onslaught of paparazzi proves to be a great strain on the Hamilton family and their privacy, and Bethany's injury prevents her from participating in the Rip Curl shoots. Local fisherman catch and kill the shark that severed Bethany's arm, much to Tom's bitter-sweet satisfaction when he compares the size of its mouth against the bite mark on Bethany's surfboard.

After a recuperation period, Bethany resumes surfing and learns to adapt to only having one arm. Inside Edition offers her a prosthetic arm with bendable joints in exchange for an interview. She declines when she learns the prosthetic will not help her surf as it is not weight bearing. Bethany eventually re-enters the competition and rejects a five-minute head start offered by the judges. She loses when she cannot stay on the board long enough to catch a competitive wave. Disheartened, Bethany intends to quit surfing, straining her friendship with Alana.

Bethany surprises Sarah by joining a mission trip to help the people of Phuket, Thailand who were devastated by a recent tsunami. Hoping to encourage the Thai children to overcome their fear of the ocean, Bethany enters the water on her surfboard. This proves successful, motivating Bethany to go surfing again.

Tom rigs a handle on Bethany's surfboard that she can use to prevent wiping out while paddling out to the waves, which is legal by the competition's rules. Bethany trains for the competition, rekindles her friendship with Alana, and enters the national championship. During the competition, she performs respectably, though she is still chasing third place. With only minutes left on the clock, the waves die down and all the surfers can only standby, waiting for the waves to start back up. Bethany senses a big wave forming and paddles toward it alone. When it forms, the others cannot reach it in time, but Bethany catches it just as the horn sounds. The judges rule that time has expired, and though Bethany does not win the competition, the winner invites Bethany to join her on the platform to share her victory.

While being interviewed, a reporter asks Bethany whether she would undo the loss of her arm if given the chance. Bethany answers that she would still choose to go with one arm, as she can embrace more people now than she ever could with both.

== Cast ==
- AnnaSophia Robb as Bethany Hamilton
- Helen Hunt as Cheri Hamilton, Bethany's mother
- Dennis Quaid as Thomas "Tom" Hamilton, Bethany's father
- Lorraine Nicholson as Alana Blanchard, Bethany's best friend
- Kevin Sorbo as Holt Blanchard, Alana's father
- Carrie Underwood as Sarah Hill
- Ross Thomas as Noah Hamilton, Bethany's older brother
- Chris Brochu as Timmy Hamilton, Bethany's older brother
- Sonya Balmores Chung as Malina Birch, Bethany's rival
- Jeremy Sumpter as Byron Blanchard, Alana's older brother
- Craig T. Nelson as Dr. David Rovinsky
- Branscombe Richmond as Ben
- Cody Gomes as Keoki
- Bethany Hamilton as Herself (archive footage)
- Alana Blanchard as Herself (archive footage)
- Sean Patrick McNamara as A Rip Curl executive
- David Chokachi as Paramedic
- Tatiana Weston-Webb played Bethany Hamilton as an 11-year-old stunt double

== Production ==
Plans for a biopic film about Bethany Hamilton had existed months after her shark attack and her subsequent recovery in 2004. During Hamilton's media attention, the father of Bethany's friends Chantilly and Tiffany, Roy "Dutch" Hofstetter, became the Hamilton family's media manager. Hofstetter, in February 2004, envisioned a film based on Bethany's experience, provisionally titled The Bethany Hamilton Story. Bethany published her biographical book Soul Surfer in 2004, and BBC reported that a film about her life was scheduled to begin filming in January 2005. Production did not begin as anticipated, and Time reported in July 2006 that production was scheduled for later in the year. Variety reported that the project at one point had an investment of $7.5 million and the backing of Peter Schlessel, a Sony Pictures executive.

Though production had not begun by the end of 2006, Sean McNamara was announced to be directing the film in January 2007. While Hamilton had a series of surfing successes, turning pro in 2007, McNamara and producer David Brookwell with her manager Roy "Dutch" Hofstetter sought more material for the film. The book was considered "a straightforward account" that was targeted to Christian readers, so the filmmakers met with the Hamilton family to determine if there were any unpublished conflicts that could be highlighted in the film. They discovered that the incident had strained the family, that family members questioned their Christian faith, and that Bethany Hamilton struggled with her physical appearance and how boys would perceive her. The media attention on the family was described by Brookwell as "a second shark attack" that had made their lives uncomfortably public.

"She was actually my suggestion. I'd seen her in several films like Bridge to Terabithia and Charlie and the Chocolate Factory and thought she could play me really well. She visited me in Hawaii and my surf coach and I taught her how to surf, so she at least looked like she knew what she was doing!"

— Bethany Hamilton on suggesting AnnaSophia Robb to portray her

McNamara, Brookwell, Hofstetter and Douglas Schwartz spent several years raising money for production. The director wrote an adapted screenplay with Michael Berk, Douglas Schwartz and Deborah Schwartz. Additional uncredited writing was performed by Ron Bass, Jen Smolka and Kara Holden. Before the film entered production, Sony Pictures Worldwide Acquisitions acquired distribution rights for North America and most other territories. The production companies Mandalay Vision, Brookwell McNamara Entertainment and Life's a Beach Entertainment collaborated for the production, with Enticing Entertainment and Island Film Group providing financing. Bethany Hamilton chose with her mother AnnaSophia Robb to portray her, as well as Sonya Balmores and Jeremy Sumpter to play Malina and Alana's brother Byron. In February 2010, Robb was announced to be part of the film as Bethany Hamilton, along with Dennis Quaid and Helen Hunt who were cast as Bethany's parents. Singer Carrie Underwood, in her feature film debut, was cast as a church youth leader. All the surfing scenes after the shark attack were done by Hamilton herself. Filming began the same month in Hawaii. Principal photography and second-unit aerial work took place for 40 days; cinematographer John R. Leonetti shot on 35mm film. During filming, Robb wore a green sleeve on her arm so visual effects could be included later. Though McNamara was editing the film by May 2010, additional filming took place in August 2010 in Tahiti. During post-production, the VFX company Engine Room worked on 450 arm-removal shots, digitally inserting the upper arm residuum in place of Robb's green sleeve. The Hamilton family was involved in the choice of music. Ultimately, the film's production budget was $18 million.

== Release ==
In July 2010, USA Today reported Soul Surfer as one of several faith-based films similar to The Blind Side, Get Low, Like Dandelion Dust, and Jumping the Broom. In September 2010, independent studio FilmDistrict was launched, and the company formed a partnership with TriStar Pictures to release Soul Surfer. FilmDistrict originally committed to release the film at 300 theaters, but when executives saw the final product, they invested $26 million in a print and advertising commitment with the goal of releasing Soul Surfer in 2,000 theaters.

Prior to the film's commercial release, it was screened for religious leaders. A scene in which Dennis Quaid's character reads the Bible in the hospital at his daughter's bedside had the words "Holy Bible" digitally removed from the cover. Bethany Hamilton's father said that David Zelon, an executive at Mandalay Pictures, lobbied to reduce the Soul Surfer's Christian elements so the film could appeal more to non-Christian audiences. The Hamilton family objected, and the words "Holy Bible" were restored in the scene in a follow-up screening. Another debated scene was one in which Carrie Underwood's character, a church youth leader, quotes biblical scripture (Jeremiah 29:11). While those involved with the film were fine with the verse, they did not want the scene to explicitly indicate that its origin was the Bible. Their stance was challenged, and the scene indicates the verse being from the Bible. The Hollywood Reporter cited the dust-up as an example of Hollywood learning to appeal to the faith-based community while still attracting secular audiences. The Blind Side, which accomplished both, had grossed $256 million in the United States and Canada.

== Reception ==
=== Box office ===
The film was released in 2,214 theaters in the United States and Canada on April 8, 2011. It grossed $10.6 million over its opening weekend, ranking fourth at the box office. Sony Pictures reported that 80% of the audience was female and that 56% were under 25 years old.

=== Critical reception ===
Soul Surfer has received mixed reviews from critics. Review aggregation website Rotten Tomatoes gives a score of 45% based on reviews from 106 critics, with an average rating of 5.4/10. The site's consensus is: "There's an amazing true story at the heart of Soul Surfer -- and unfortunately, it's drowned by waves of Hollywood cheese." On Metacritic it has a weighted average score of 53 out of 100 based on 27 critics, indicating "mixed or average reviews". Audiences polled by CinemaScore gave it was a rare A+ grade.

Roger Ebert of the Chicago Sun-Times was mildly positive in his review, giving the film two-and-a-half stars out of four and writing "Soul Surfer is a wholesome movie, intended as inspirational. Whether it will cheer viewers who are not as capable as Bethany is an excellent question. AnnaSophia Robb is a convincing, cheerful heroine. Dennis Quaid and Helen Hunt, as Bethany's parents, are stalwart and supportive, although the script indeed leaves them with no other choice." Owen Gleiberman of Entertainment Weekly gave the film a B grade, writing "[t]he more cynical viewers out there may say, 'Not for me.' But Soul Surfer, while formulaic in design, is an authentic and heartfelt movie." S. Jhoanna Robledo of Common Sense Media gave the film three stars out of five, writing "Yes, it's a message movie, but the message burrows deep enough under your skin to make the movie, given its utter conventionality, unexpectedly stirring."

=== Accolades ===
Awards and nominations
Association	Category	Nominee(s)	Result	Ref.
Casting Society of America	Outstanding Achievement in Casting: Feature – Studio or Independent Comedy	Joey Paul Jensen	Nominated	
Crystal Dove Seal Award	Best Drama	Soul Surfer	Won	
ESPY Awards	Best Sports Movie	Soul Surfer	Nominated	
Movieguide Awards	Best Film for Family Audiences	Soul Surfer	Won	
Movieguide Awards	Most Inspiring Performance in Movies in 2011	Dennis Quaid, AnnaSophia Robb, Kevin Sorbo	Nominated	
People's Choice Awards	Favorite Book Adaptation	Soul Surfer	Nominated	
Satellite Awards	Best Original Score	Marco Beltrami	Won	
Teen Choice Awards	Choice Movie Drama	Soul Surfer	Nominated	
Teen Choice Awards	Choice Movie Drama Actress	AnnaSophia Robb	Nominated	
Women Film Critics Circle	Best Female Images in a Movie	Soul Surfer	Nominated	

== Home media ==
Soul Surfer was released on DVD and Blu-ray on July 26, 2011, by Sony Pictures Home Entertainment.

== See also ==
- Long Journey Back, a 1978 film about a female amputee's recovery after her leg is severed in a bus accident
