= Aaron Chang =

American photographer

Aaron Chang (born August 9, 1956) is an American photographer specialized in surfing and ocean photography. He spent 25 years as a senior photographer at Surfing Magazine; he was an early photographer to practice the act of shooting waves with a wide angle lens from the water.

Chang later focused on fine art photography. He owns two art galleries that show his work in Solana Beach and Carmel-by-the-Sea, California. Chang splits his time between Carlsbad and Carmel, California.

== Early life ==
Chang was born in 1956 in Tucson, Arizona, the eldest of Howard and Marilyn Chang's two children. Aaron's father, a math teacher, introduced him to photography at age 9 when he gave him a Bellows camera. The family moved to Imperial Beach, a region of San Diego, California when he was 11. In high school, Chang swam competitively, surfed and worked in the lab developing photos at the high school where his father taught. He graduated in 1974 and after moved to Oahu.

== Career ==
=== Surf photography ===
Chang worked in Waikiki taking pictures of tourists at luaus at the Royal Hawaiian and on boat cruises. He then moved to the North Shore, where he worked as a photographer shooting postcards. Three years after, Larry Moore from Surfing Magazine saw Chang's photography and put Chang on staff at the magazine in 1979.

In the 1980s, the photography industry saw new motor drives, improved lenses and higher-quality film stock. Chang applied these techniques to shooting the sport of surfing. He was one of the early photographers to use a camera in the water to capture surfing photography. Chang's most significant contribution to early surf photography was the use of an ultra wide angle lens in the barrel in big waves, something that no one had tried before in the 1980s.

Chang was a senior photographer for 25 years at Surfing Magazine; his photos were selected for 38 magazine covers. His shot of an arcing wave at the Banzai Pipeline appeared on the cover of Surfing Magazine in 1985; it was the first significant empty wave shot with no person featured.

Chang has traveled to 50 countries for book projects, films, and travel journalism assignments. His work has appeared in Newsweek, Sports Illustrated, GQ, People, US Weekly and Elle. He has shot a variety of subjects, including poets, surfers, bikini models and Nobel scientists, and elephants in the Namibian bush.

Chang was selected as one of the photojournalists for seven "Day in the Life" book projects. His work has been included in illustrated surfing books, including Pure Stoke (1982), The History of Surfing (1983), and Surfing: The Ultimate Pleasure (1984).

He was named one of the top five sports photographers by American Photographer Magazine in 1985. Chang has been featured on a variety TV shows, including networks such as PBS and Fuel TV. He is a subject in Doug Walker's surf documentary Lost and Found (2011).

=== Other projects ===
Chang has worked on commercial accounts, including Polaris Industries, Yamaha Corporation, Levi Strauss & Co., Billabong, and Nike, Inc.

In 1994, Chang launched Aaron Chang Clothing, a beachwear line. The California Surf Museum also housed an exhibit titled Aaron Chang: Water Housings and Cameras and Hobie: Shaping a Culture in 2012 showing all of Chang's underwater camera housings used to capture his in-the-water shots.

=== Fine art photography ===
In 2009, Chang shifted to work in fine art photography with a focus on arcing waves, the sea and light. Chang's photography has been included in the San Diego Natural History Museum at an exhibit called On The Trail of Ansel Adams. This exhibit highlighted black and white, nature-based imagery from multiple photographers that were inspired by the photographer Ansel Adams.

== Publications ==
- San Diego: Through the lens of Aaron Chang.
