= 2024 World Surf League Finals =

- Venue: Lower Trestles
- Location: San Clemente, California, United States
- Dates: September 6, 2024
- Competitors: 10 from 5 nations

Champions
- Men: (Hawaii) John John Florence (3)
- Women: (United States) Caitlin Simmers (1)

The 2024 Lexus WSL Finals was the 10th and final event of the 2024 World Surf League. It was the fourth edition of the World Surf League Finals, and took place at Lower Trestles in California on September 6, 2024.

== Format ==
The event featured the top five surfers from both the men's and women's regular season standings, and consisted of four head-to-head matches, held on a single day. In the first match, the surfers ranked fourth and fifth went head-to-head, with the winner advancing to take on the third-ranked surfer in the second match. The winner of the second match then took on the second-ranked surfer in the third match, with the winner qualifying for the title match against the top-ranked surfer in the standings.

== Results ==
=== Men ===
==== Draw ====
Match 1
4	(Australia) Ethan Ewing	14.83
5	(Brazil) Ítalo Ferreira	15.47

Match 2
3	(Australia) Jack Robinson	9.94
5	(Brazil) Ítalo Ferreira	14.57

Match 3
2	(United States) Griffin Colapinto	14.33
5	(Brazil) Ítalo Ferreira	14.47

Title match
1	(Hawaii) John John Florence	2
5	(Brazil) Ítalo Ferreira	0

==== Title match ====
(Hawaii) John John Florence	Round	(Brazil) Ítalo Ferreira
15.50	1	15.33
18.13	2	16.30
-	3	-

=== Women ===
==== Draw ====
Match 1
4	(Australia) Molly Picklum	9.40
5	(Brazil) Tatiana Weston-Webb	12.74

Match 2
3	(Costa Rica) Brisa Hennessy	13.17
5	(Brazil) Tatiana Weston-Webb	13.77

Match 3
2	(United States) Caroline Marks	14.20
5	(Brazil) Tatiana Weston-Webb	13.83

Title match
1	(United States) Caitlin Simmers	2
2	(United States) Caroline Marks	1

==== Title match ====
(United States) Caitlin Simmers	Round	(United States) Caroline Marks
16.87	1	17.43
18.37	2	14.17
15.16	3	7.17
