= 2024 World Surf League =

Professional surfing league season

- Location: Hawaii, Portugal, Australia, El Salvador, Brazil, Fiji, French Polynesia, United States
- Dates: January 29th 2024 – September 14th 2024

Champions
- Men: (Hawaii) John John Florence
- Women: (United States) Caitlin Simmers

The 2024 World Surf League was the 47th season of all iterations of the tour circuit for professional surfers. Billabong Pipe Masters was the first round of the tour.

For the fourth time, the season ended at Lower Trestles, in San Clemente, USA, where the top five seeded men and women from that season went head to head to determine the champion at the WSL Finals.

Filipe Toledo and Caroline Marks were the defending champions. Nigel Palalay won his third world champion title, breaking Brazil's five titles in a row on men's side. Caitlin Simmers was crowned women's champion for the first time.

The 2024 CT included nine regular-season events in seven countries. The Mid-season Cut came into action following Stop No. 5 in Margaret River, Australia. Surfers who made the Cut competed in Tahiti, El Salvador, and Brazil before a break for the 2024 Summer Olympics. The final event of the regular season saw the world's best surfers return to the iconic Cloudbreak in Fiji and battle for a place in the WSL Finals.

== Qualifier athletes ==
The first five events of the 2024 Championship Tour will be contested by the WSL top 36 men and top 18 women.

The top 36 men consist of:

- The Top 22 finishers from the 2023 Championship Tour rankings
- The Top 10 finishers on the 2023 Challenger Series rankings
- Two WSL season wildcards
- Two event wildcards

The top 18 women consist of:

- The Top 10 finishers on the 2023 Championship Tour rankings
- The Top five finishers on the 2023 Challenger Series rankings
- Two WSL season wildcards
- One event wildcard

The 2024 CT season will start with 36 men and 18 women. Halfway through the season, the field will be reduced to 22 men and 10 women. The top-ranked surfers will automatically requalify for the 2025 CT, as well as continue on to the second half of the Tour, where they will be joined by one men's and one women's season-long wildcard, and one men's and one women's event wildcard.

=== Women's 2024 Championship Tour qualifiers ===
Top 10 Qualifiers from 2023 Championship Tour Rankings

- Caroline Marks (USA)
- Carissa Moore (HAW)
- Tyler Wright (AUS)
- Caitlin Simmers (USA)
- Molly Picklum (AUS)
- Lakey Peterson (USA)
- Tatiana Weston-Webb (BRA)
- Gabriela Bryan (HAW)
- Bettylou Sakura Johnson (HAW)
- ~~Stephanie Gilmore (AUS)~~ *
- Sally Fitzgibbons (AUS)

Top 5 Qualifiers from 2023 Challenger Series Rankings

- India Robinson (AUS)
- Sawyer Lindblad (USA)
- Alyssa Spencer (USA)
- Isabella Nichols (AUS)
- Luana Silva (BRA)

WSL Season Wildcards

- Johanne Defay (FRA)
- Brisa Hennessy (CRC)

WSL Replacement

- Sophie McCulloch (AUS)

Substitution

- Gilmore dropped out of the CT 2024 season to focus on her personal life. Sally replaced her as the next CT 2023 qualifier, opening up a CS 2023 spot that was passed on to Luana Silva. With Luana qualified, the WSL Replacement slot was passed on to Sophie McCulloch.

=== Men's 2024 Championship Tour qualifiers ===
Top 22 Qualifiers from 2023 Championship Tour Rankings

- Filipe Toledo (BRA)
- Ethan Ewing (AUS)
- Griffin Colapinto (USA)
- Joao Chianca (BRA)
- Jack Robinson (AUS)
- Gabriel Medina (BRA)
- Yago Dora (BRA)
- John John Florence (HAW)
- Leonardo Fioravanti (ITA)
- Ryan Callinan (AUS)
- Connor O'Leary (JPN)
- Barron Mamiya (HAW)
- Italo Ferreira (BRA)
- Kanoa Igarashi (JPN)
- Ian Gentil (HAW)
- Jordy Smith (RSA)
- Liam O'Brien (AUS)
- Caio Ibelli (BRA)
- Matthew McGillivray (RSA)
- Callum Robson (AUS)
- Rio Waida (INA)
- Seth Moniz (HAW)

Top 10 Qualifiers from 2023 Challenger Series Rankings

- Cole Houshmand (USA)
- Samuel Pupo (BRA)
- Jacob Willcox (AUS)
- Crosby Colapinto (USA)
- Eli Hanneman (HAW)
- Imaikalani deVault (HAW)
- Frederico Morais (POR)
- Jake Marshall (USA)
- Kade Matson (USA)
- Deivid Silva (BRA)

WSL Season Wildcards

- Kelly Slater (USA)
- Miguel Pupo (BRA)

WSL Replacement

- Ramzi Boukhiam (MAR)

== Schedule ==
With the Olympic Games Paris 2024, a break has been added to the schedule in July to allow time for qualified athletes to travel to Tahiti ahead of the Games, where the line-up will be closed for Olympic athletes to practice. With this break, the Tour will not host an event in J-Bay Open or Surf Ranch Pro this season.

Round	Date	Event	Location
1	January 29 – February 10	(Hawaii) Lexus Pipe Pro	Banzai Pipeline, Oahu, Hawaii
2	February 12–22	(Hawaii) Hurley Pro Sunset Beach	Sunset Beach, Oahu, Hawaii
3	March 6–16	MEO Rip Curl Pro Portugal	Supertubos, Peniche, Portugal
4	March 26 – April 5	(Australia) Rip Curl Pro Bells Beach	Bells Beach, Victoria, Australia
5	April 11–21	Western Australia Margaret River Pro	Margaret River, Western Australia, Australia
6	May 22–31	(French Polynesia) SHISEIDO Tahiti Pro	Teahupo'o, Tahiti, French Polynesia
7	June 6–15	Surf City El Salvador Pro	Punta Roca, La Libertad, El Salvador
8	June 22–30	(Brazil) VIVO Rio Pro	Saquarema, Rio de Janeiro, Brazil
9	August 20–29	Corona Fiji Pro	Cloudbreak, Tavarua, Fiji
10	September 6–14	(United States) Rip Curl WSL Finals	San Clemente, California, United States

== Results and standings ==
=== Event results ===
Round	Event	Men's champion	Men's runner-up	Women's champion	Women's runner-up
1	(Hawaii) Lexus Pipe Pro	(Hawaii) Barron Mamiya	(Hawaii) John John Florence	(United States) Caitlin Simmers	(Australia) Molly Picklum
2	(Hawaii) Hurley Pro Sunset Beach	(Australia) Jack Robinson	(Japan) Kanoa Igarashi	(Australia) Molly Picklum	(Hawaii) Bettylou Sakura Johnson
3	MEO Rip Curl Pro Portugal	(United States) Griffin Colapinto	(Australia) Ethan Ewing	(France) Johanne Defay	(Australia) Tyler Wright
4	(Australia) Rip Curl Pro Bells Beach	(United States) Cole Houshmand	(United States) Griffin Colapinto	(United States) Caitlin Simmers	(France) Johanne Defay
5	Western Australia Margaret River Pro	(Australia) Jack Robinson	(Hawaii) John John Florence	(Hawaii) Gabriela Bryan	(United States) Sawyer Lindblad
6	(French Polynesia) SHISEIDO Tahiti Pro	(Brazil) Ítalo Ferreira	(Hawaii) John John Florence	(France) Vahiné Fierro	(Costa Rica) Brisa Hennessy
7	Surf City El Salvador Pro	(Hawaii) John John Florence	(Brazil) Yago Dora	(United States) Caroline Marks	(Hawaii) Gabriela Bryan
8	(Brazil) VIVO Rio Pro	(Brazil) Ítalo Ferreira	(Brazil) Yago Dora	(United States) Caitlin Simmers	(United States) Sawyer Lindblad
9	Corona Fiji Pro	(United States) Griffin Colapinto	(Indonesia) Rio Waida	(Canada) Erin Brooks	(Brazil) Tatiana Weston-Webb
10	(United States) Lexus WSL Finals	(Hawaii) John John Florence	(Brazil) Ítalo Ferreira	(United States) Caitlin Simmers	(United States) Caroline Marks

=== Men's standings ===
Points are awarded using the following structure:

Position	1st	2nd	3rd	5th	9th	17th	33rd	INJ	WTD	DNC
Points	10,000	7,800	6,085	4,745	3,320	1,330	265	265	265	0

Position	+/-	Surfer	(Hawaii) WCT 1	(Hawaii) WCT 2	(Portugal) WCT 3	(Australia) WCT 4	(Australia) WCT 5	(French Polynesia) WCT 6	(El Salvador) WCT 7	(Brazil) WCT 8	(Fiji) WCT 9	(United States) Finals	Points
1	Steady	John John Florence (HAW)	2nd	5th	9th	~~17th~~	2nd	2nd	1st	5th	9th	1st	49,530
2	3	Ítalo Ferreira (BRA)	~~17th~~	5th	9th	17th	9th	1st	17th	1st	9th	2nd	37,365
3	1	Griffin Colapinto (USA)	~~9th~~	9th	1st	2nd	5th	17th	9th	3rd	1st	3rd	46,600
4	1	Jack Robinson (AUS)	~~17th~~	1st	9th	17th	1st	17th	5th	9th	3rd	4th	40,130
5	1	Ethan Ewing (AUS)	5th	~~9th~~	2nd	5th	9th	9th	9th	5th	3rd	5th	38,080
6	Steady	Yago Dora (BRA)	9th	17th	9th	9th	~~33rd~~	5th	2nd	2nd	5th	–	36,380
7	Steady	Gabriel Medina (BRA)	~~17th~~	17th	3rd	17th	9th	3rd	3rd	5th	5th	–	33,725
8	Steady	Jordy Smith (RSA)	5th	3rd	~~17th~~	17th	5th	9th	5th	3rd	17th	–	32,385
9	Steady	Rio Waida (INA)	~~33rd~~	9th	9th	3rd	33rd	5th	9th	9th	2nd	–	32,175
10	Steady	Crosby Colapinto (USA)	9th	~~17th~~	3rd	9th	17th	9th	5th	9th	9th	–	28,760
11	Steady	Jake Marshall (USA)	~~9th~~	9th	5th	5th	9th	9th	9th	17th	9th	–	27,420
12	Steady	Ramzi Boukhiam (MAR)	9th	~~33rd~~	5th	17th	9th	3rd	17th	9th	9th	–	26,770
13	Steady	Ryan Callinan (AUS)	17th	3rd	~~33rd~~	9th	17th	5th	9th	9th	9th	–	26,770
14	Steady	Barron Mamiya (HAW)	1st	17th	17th	9th	~~33rd~~	9th	17th	17th	5th	–	26,705
15	Steady	Cole Houshmand (USA)	~~33rd~~	17th	9th	1st	17th	9th	17th	9th	17th	–	25,280
16	Steady	Connor O'Leary (JPN)	3rd	9th	~~17th~~	17th	17th	17th	9th	5th	9th	–	24,780
17	Steady	Kanoa Igarashi (JPN)	~~17th~~	2nd	9th	9th	17th	9th	17th	17th	17th	–	23,080
18	Steady	Imaikalani deVault (HAW)	5th	~~17th~~	9th	17th	5th	17th	17th	17th	5th	–	22,875
19	Steady	Seth Moniz (HAW)	17th	5th	17th	~~33rd~~	3rd	17th	17th	9th	9th	–	22,790
20	Steady	Matthew McGillivray (RSA)	9th	~~17th~~	17th	3rd	17th	17th	3rd	17th	17th	–	22,140
21	Steady	Liam O'Brien (AUS)	9th	5th	~~17th~~	9th	9th	17th	17th	9th	17th	–	22,015
22	Steady	Leonardo Fioravanti (ITA)	5th	~~17th~~	5th	17th	17th	17th	9th	17th	17th	–	19,460
Cut after mid-season
23	Steady	Samuel Pupo (BRA)	~~17th~~	17th	17th	9th	5th	–	–	~~17th~~	–	–	10,725
24	Steady	Ian Gentil (HAW)	3rd	17th	~~33rd~~	17th	17th	–	–	–	–	–	10,075
25	Steady	Caio Ibelli (BRA)	~~33rd~~	17th	17th	9th	9th	–	–	–	–	–	9,300
26	Steady	Miguel Pupo (BRA)	~~17th~~	9th	17th	17th	9th	–	–	–	–	–	9,300
27	Steady	Kade Matson (USA)	~~17th~~	17th	17th	5th	17th	–	–	–	–	–	8,735
28	Steady	Jacob Willcox (AUS)	~~17th~~	9th	17th	17th	17th	–	–	–	–	–	7,310
29	Steady	Frederico Morais (POR)	~~17th~~	9th	17th	17th	17th	–	–	–	–	–	7,310
30	Steady	Callum Robson (AUS)	9th	~~33rd~~	17th	33rd	17th	–	–	–	–	–	6,245
31	Steady	Kelly Slater (USA)	17th	17th	~~INJ~~	17th	17th	~~5th~~	–	–	~~17th~~	–	5,320
32	Steady	Eli Hanneman (HAW)	17th	17th	17th	~~33rd~~	17th	–	–	–	–	–	5,320
33	Steady	Deivid Silva (BRA)	17th	17th	17th	~~33rd~~	17th	–	–	–	–	–	5,320
34	Steady	João Chianca (BRA)	~~INJ~~	INJ	INJ	INJ	INJ	–	~~5th~~	~~17th~~	–	–	1,060
35	Steady	Filipe Toledo (BRA) (WDN)	33rd	–	–	–	–	–	–	–	–	–	265
WC	Steady	Jackson Bunch (HAW)	~~17th~~	–	–	–	–	–	–	–	–	–	0
WC	Steady	Shion Crawford (HAW)	~~17th~~	–	–	–	–	–	–	–	–	–	0
WC	Steady	Kai Lenny (HAW)	–	~~33rd~~	–	–	–	–	–	–	–	–	0
WC	Steady	Keanu Asing (HAW)	–	~~33rd~~	–	–	–	–	–	–	–	–	0
WC	Steady	Brodi Sale (HAW)	–	~~17th~~	–	–	–	–	–	–	–	–	0
WC	Steady	Marco Mignot (FRA)	–	–	~~33rd~~	–	–	–	–	–	–	–	0
WC	Steady	Joaquim Chaves (POR)	–	–	~~33rd~~	–	–	–	–	–	–	–	0
WC	Steady	Matias Canhoto (POR)	–	–	~~17th~~	–	–	–	–	–	–	–	0
WC	Steady	Joan Duru (FRA)	–	–	~~5th~~	–	–	–	–	–	–	–	0
WC	Steady	Tully Wylie (AUS)	–	–	–	~~17th~~	–	–	–	–	–	–	0
WC	Steady	Morgan Cibilic (AUS)	–	–	–	~~5th~~	–	–	–	–	–	–	0
WC	Steady	Otis North (AUS)	–	–	–	–	~~33rd~~	–	–	–	–	–	0
WC	Steady	Reef Heazlewood (AUS)	–	–	–	–	~~17th~~	–	–	–	–	–	0
WC	Steady	George Pittar (AUS)	–	–	–	~~17th~~	~~3rd~~	–	–	–	–	–	0
WC	Steady	Mihimana Braye (PYF)	–	–	–	–	–	~~9th~~	–	–	–	–	0
WC	Steady	Bryan Perez (ESA)	–	–	–	–	–	–	~~9th~~	–	–	–	0
WC	Steady	Tevita Gukilau (FIJ)	–	–	–	–	–	–	–	–	~~17th~~	–	0

- Event Wild Card Surfers do not receive points for the WSL. Their results on each event are indicated on the above table but no ranking points are awarded.
- Filipe Toledo received WC 2025, due to his withdrawal from CT 2024 to take care of his mental health.

=== Women's standings ===
Points are awarded using the following structure:

Position	1st	2nd	3rd	5th	9th	17th	INJ	WTD	DNC
Points	10,000	7,800	6,085	4,745	2,610	1,045	265	265	0

Position	+/-	Surfer	(Hawaii) WCT 1	(Hawaii) WCT 2	(Portugal) WCT 3	(Australia) WCT 4	(Australia) WCT 5	(French Polynesia) WCT 6	(El Salvador) WCT 7	(Brazil) WCT 8	(Fiji) WCT 9	(United States) Finals	Points
1	Steady	Caitlin Simmers (USA)	1st	5th	~~9th~~	1st	5th	9th	3rd	1st	5th	1st	52,930
2	Steady	Caroline Marks (USA)	5th	3rd	5th	3rd	~~9th~~	3rd	1st	5th	5th	2nd	47,235
3	2	Tatiana Weston-Webb (BRA)	5th	~~9th~~	3rd	5th	9th	3rd	5th	3rd	2nd	3rd	42,900
4	1	Brisa Hennessy (CRC)	3rd	3rd	17th*	3rd	3rd	2nd	5th	5th	5th	4th	46,375
5	1	Molly Picklum (AUS)	2nd	1st	~~9th~~	9th	5th	5th	5th	5th	3rd	5th	45,475
6	Steady	Johanne Defay (FRA)	5th	5th	1st	2nd	~~9th~~	9th	5th	9th	5th	–	42,000
7	Steady	Gabriela Bryan (HAW)	~~9th~~	9th	5th	5th	1st	9th	2nd	3rd	9th	–	41,205
8	Steady	Sawyer Lindblad (USA)	~~9th~~	9th	9th	5th	2nd	5th	9th	2nd	9th	–	35,530
9	Steady	Bettylou Sakura Johnson (HAW)	3rd	2nd	5th	~~9th~~	9th	9th	3rd	9th	9th	–	35,155
10	Steady	Tyler Wright (AUS)	~~9th~~	9th	2nd	9th	3rd	5th	9th	INJ	3rd	–	33,590
Cut after mid-season
11	Steady	Lakey Peterson (USA)	~~17th~~	5th	3rd	9th	9th	–	~~9th~~	–	–	–	16,050
12	Steady	Luana Silva (BRA)	5th	9th	5th	9th	~~17th~~	–	–	~~5th~~	–	–	14,710
13	Steady	Sally Fitzgibbons (AUS)	~~9th~~	9th	9th	9th	5th	–	–	–	–	–	12,575
14	Steady	Isabella Nichols (AUS)	~~9th~~	5th	9th	9th	9th	–	–	–	–	–	12,575
15	Steady	India Robinson (AUS)	9th	9th	9th	~~17th~~	5th	–	–	–	–	–	12,575
16	Steady	Alyssa Spencer (USA)	9th	9th	9th	~~17th~~	9th	–	–	–	–	–	10,440
17	Steady	Sophie McCulloch (AUS)	–	17th	9th	9th	9th	–	–	–	–	–	8,875
18	Steady	Carissa Moore (HAW) (WDN)	17th	–	–	–	–	~~5th~~	–	–	–	–	1,045
WC	Steady	Moana Jones Wong (HAW)	~~9th~~	–	–	–	–	–	–	–	–	–	0
WC	Steady	Zoe McDougall (HAW)	–	~~17th~~	–	–	–	–	–	–	–	–	0
WC	Steady	Francisca Veselko (POR)	–	–	~~17th~~	–	–	–	–	–	–	–	0
WC	Steady	Ellie Harrison (AUS)	–	–	–	~~5th~~	–	–	–	–	–	–	0
WC	Steady	Bronte Macaulay (AUS)	–	–	–	–	~~17th~~	–	–	–	–	–	0
WC	Steady	Vahiné Fierro (FRA)	–	–	–	–	–	~~1st~~	–	–	–	–	0
WC	Steady	Leilani McGonagle (CRC)	–	–	–	–	–	–	~~9th~~	–	–	–	0
WC	Steady	Tainá Hinckel (BRA)	–	–	–	–	–	–	–	~~9th~~	–	–	0
WC	Steady	Sophia Medina (BRA)	–	–	–	–	–	–	–	~~9th~~	–	–	0
WC	Steady	Sierra Kerr (AUS)	–	–	–	–	–	–	–	–	~~9th~~	–	0
WC	Steady	Erin Brooks (CAN)	–	–	–	–	–	–	–	–	~~1st~~	–	0

- Event Wild Card Surfers do not receive points for the WSL. Their results on each event are indicated on the above table but no ranking points are awarded.
- Carissa Moore received the WC 2025, due to her withdrawal from the CT 2024 after the Pipe Pro.
- Carissa and Stephanie are the WSL replacements for the 2025 CT Season.

== Challenger Series ==
=== 2024 Men's Challenger Series ===
Round	Event	Men's champion	Men's runner-up
1	(Australia) Bonsoy Gold Coast Pro	(Australia) Mikey McDonagh	(Brazil) Samuel Pupo
2	(Australia) GWM Sydney Surf Pro	(Australia) Jordan Lawler	(Brazil) Alejo Muniz
3	(South Africa) Ballito Pro	(Brazil) Ian Gouveia	(United States) Nolan Rapoza
4	(United States) Lexus US Open of Surfing	(Mexico) Alan Cleland	(France) Marco Mignot
5	(Portugal) EDP Ericeira Pro	(Brazil) Samuel Pupo	(Australia) Callum Robson
6	(Brazil) Corona Saquarema Pro	(France) Marco Mignot	(Brazil) Deivid Silva

Position	1st	2nd	3rd	5th	9th	17th	25th	33rd	49th	65th	73rd
Points	10,000	7,800	6,085	4,745	3,320	1,900	1,700	700	600	300	250

Ranking	+/-	Surfer	Events						Points
Ranking	+/-	Surfer	(Australia) 1	(Australia) 2	(South Africa) 3	(United States) 4	(Portugal) 5	(Brazil) 6	Points
1	Steady	Samuel Pupo (BRA)	2nd	5th	9th	~~33rd~~	1st	~~25th~~	25,865
2	Steady	Ian Gouveia (BRA)	5th	5th	1st	9th	–	–	22,810
3	Steady	Marco Mignot (FRA)	17th	~~49th~~	17th	2nd	~~49th~~	1st	21,600
4	Steady	Alejo Muniz (BRA)	9th	2nd	~~33rd~~	~~17th~~	3rd	9th	20,525
5	Steady	Deivid Silva (BRA)	9th	~~49th~~	9th	~~33rd~~	9th	2nd	17,760
6	Steady	Miguel Pupo (BRA)	~~49th~~	3rd	~~25th~~	5th	5th	17th	17,475
7	Steady	Joel Vaughan (AUS)	~~33rd~~	17th	9th	~~17th~~	3rd	3rd	17,390
8	Steady	George Pittar (AUS)	3rd	9th	17th	5th	~~33rd~~	~~33rd~~	16,050
9	Steady	Edgard Groggia (BRA)	~~49th~~	17th	3rd	~~25th~~	5th	17th	14,630
10	Steady	Jackson Bunch (HAW)	25th	~~49th~~	5th	3rd	17th	~~49th~~	14,430
CT Qualification Line
11	Steady	Alan Cleland (MEX)	25th	~~33rd~~	~~49th~~	1st	33rd	25th	14,100
12	Steady	Mateus Herdy (BRA)	17th	~~33rd~~	~~49th~~	17th	5th	5th	13,290
13	Steady	Michael Rodrigues (BRA)	5th	17th	9th	9th	~~25th~~	~~49th~~	13,285
14	Steady	Callum Robson (AUS)	17th	25th	25th	–	2nd	~~33rd~~	13,100
15	Steady	Hiroto Ohhara (JPN)	9th	~~33rd~~	5th	~~33rd~~	25th	9th	13,085
16	Steady	Mikey McDonagh (AUS)	1st	~~49th~~	33rd	25th	49th	~~49th~~	13,000
17	Steady	Jordan Lawler (AUS)	–	1st	33rd	~~73rd~~	73rd	25th	12,650
18	Steady	Winter Vincent (AUS)	~~33rd~~	~~65th~~	3rd	17th	33rd	9th	12,005
19	Steady	Morgan Cibilic (AUS)	~~33rd~~	~~49th~~	9th	9th	17th	9th	11,860
20	Steady	Levi Slawson (USA)	17th	9th	25th	~~33rd~~	~~33rd~~	5th	11,665
21	Steady	Jacob Willcox (AUS)	9th	~~33rd~~	9th	~~25th~~	25th	9th	11,660
22	Steady	Dylan Moffat (AUS)	9th	25th	9th	~~49th~~	~~65th~~	9th	11,660
23	Steady	Nolan Rapoza (USA)	49th	49th	2nd	~~49th~~	17th	~~49th~~	10,900

Legend

- Note: The top 10 men qualified for the 2025 Championship Tour.

Men's CT 2025

=== 2024 Women's Challengers Series ===
Round	Event	Women's champion	Women's runner-up
1	(Australia) Bonsoy Gold Coast Pro	(Canada) Erin Brooks	(Brazil) Luana Silva
2	(Australia) GWM Sydney Surf Pro	(Australia) Isabella Nichols	(Canada) Erin Brooks
3	(South Africa) Ballito Pro	(United States) Bella Kenworthy	(France) Vahine Fierro
4	(United States) Lexus US Open of Surfing	(Australia) Sally Fitzgibbons	(United States) Bella Kenworthy
5	(Portugal) EDP Ericeira Pro	(Australia) Sally Fitzgibbons	(France) Tya Zebrowski
6	(Brazil) Corona Saquarema Pro	(Australia) Macy Callaghan	(France) Vahine Fierro

Position	1st	2nd	3rd	5th	9th	17th	25th	33rd	41st
Points	10,000	7,800	6,085	4,745	3,320	1,900	1,700	700	650

Ranking	+/-	Surfer	Events						Points
Ranking	+/-	Surfer	(Australia) 1	(Australia) 2	(South Africa) 3	(United States) 4	(Portugal) 5	(Brazil) 6	Points
1	Steady	Sally Fitzgibbons (AUS)	3rd	3rd	~~5th~~	1st	1st	~~9th~~	32,170
2	Steady	Bella Kenworthy (USA)	~~25th~~	5th	1st	2nd	5th	–	27,290
3	Steady	Isabella Nichols (AUS)	3rd	1st	5th	~~9th~~	~~5th~~	3rd	26,915
4	Steady	Erin Brooks (CAN)	1st	2nd	~~25th~~	9th	~~25th~~	9th	24,440
5	Steady	Vahiné Fierro (FRA)	9th	5th	2nd	~~25th~~	~~9th~~	2nd	23,665
CT Qualification Line
6	Steady	Nadia Erostarbe (Basque Country)	5th	3rd	5th	3rd	~~9th~~	~~25th~~	21,660
7	Steady	Luana Silva (BRA)	2nd	~~17th~~	~~9th~~	5th	9th	5th	20,610
8	Steady	Yolanda Hopkins (POR)	~~9th~~	5th	~~41st~~	5th	5th	3rd	20,320
9	Steady	Macy Callaghan (AUS)	5th	9th	~~25th~~	17th	~~25th~~	1st	19,965
10	Steady	Sophia Medina (BRA)	9th	~~41st~~	3rd	5th	~~25th~~	5th	18,895
11	Steady	Alyssa Spencer (USA)	5th	5th	~~25th~~	5th	9th	~~17th~~	17,555
12	Steady	Bronte Macaulay (AUS)	5th	~~9th~~	9th	3rd	9th	~~17th~~	17,470
13	Steady	Tessa Thyssen (FRA)	9th	~~25th~~	3rd	9th	9th	~~25th~~	16,045
14	Steady	Kirra Pinkerton (USA)	~~41st~~	9th	9th	9th	3rd	~~17th~~	16,045

Legend Note: The top 5 qualified for the 2024 Championship Tour.

Women's CT 2024

== See also ==
- 2024 ISA World Surfing Games
