= 2026 World Surf League =

Professional surfing league season

- Location: Australia, El Salvador, Brazil, New Zealand, French Polynesia, Fiji, United States, United Arab Emirates, Portugal, Philippines, Hawaii
- Dates: April 1st 2026 – December 20th 2026

The 2026 World Surf League is the 49th season of all iterations of the tour circuit for professional surfers. The first event of the tour was the Rip Curl Pro Bells Beach, the longest running professional surfing competition in the world.

The competition format has changed. Starting in the 2026 season, the WSL Finals will no longer be held to decide the champion. The competition format will return to a points system, with the last event of the season returning to the iconic waves of Pipeline.

Yago Dora and Molly Picklum are the defending champions from the 2025 season. 36 men and 24 women are set to compete in the 2026 Championship Tour.

In November 2025, the WSL announced that the 2026 Tour will see the return of four former world champions: Stephanie Gilmore and Carissa Moore in the women's tour, and Gabriel Medina and John John Florence in the men's tour. All four were awarded WSL CT Season Wildcards for 2026. In January 2026, John John Florence announced that he had ultimately decided to defer his CT return until 2027. The wildcard spot previously given to John John Florence was subsequently awarded to Ramzi Boukhiam, who missed the last three 2025 CT events prior to the Cut in 2025 due to a serious injury sustained during competition at Bells Beach.

The 2026 Championship Tour will span nine months and visit nine countries, with 13 events scheduled. The lineup includes a range of wave types-from barreling reef breaks like Pipeline, Cloudbreak, and Teahupo'o to performance-oriented locations such as Lower Trestles, Punta Roca, and Abu Dhabi. The schedule also features well-known stops like Snapper Rocks, Margaret River, Portugal, Saquarema, and opens at Bells Beach.

The 2026 CT will follow a new format that differs from those of previous years. Under the new system, 36 men and 24 women will compete in nine "regular-season" events, at which point the competition will be narrowed to 24 men (top 22 competitors + 2 wildcards) and 16 women (top 14 competitors + 2 wildcards) for the final three "postseason" events, during which competitors will be given the opportunity to accumulate more points. Surfers will carry only their best seven of nine results from the regular season into the next stage. For the first time in 5 years, there will be no mid-season cut.

The nine "regular-season" events and three "postseason" events will be followed by a reimagined Pipe Masters on the North Shore of O'ahu, Hawai'i as the thirteenth and final event of the tour, which will now award 15,000 points, 1.5 times more than a standard CT event. The full 2026 men's and women's CT fields from the start of the season will rejoin the postseason competitors to compete in this final event.

In July 2026, the WSL announced that they had added an additional location to the CT schedule for 2026 to ensure a minimum of 12 events can be delivered during the season, should the Surf Abu Dhabi Pro be unable to run as scheduled as a result of the 2026 Iran war. The event will be a third "postseason" event in addition to the two previously announced events in the UAE and Portugal.

In September, it was announced that the Surf Abu Dhabi Pro would no longer go ahead as a result of the war. “We explored every option to keep the Surf Abu Dhabi Pro on the calendar this year,” explained Ryan Crosby, WSL CEO. “Unfortunately, the current conditions and logistical limitations made it impossible for us to move forward. It was a difficult decision, but the right one at this time. We value our partnership with Surf Abu Dhabi, and look forward to returning.” As a result, the CT schedule returned to a 12 event season.

The final season rankings, and ultimately the World Titles, will be determined by a surfer's best nine of 12 results.

In another major change from previous years, elimination rounds have also been removed, meaning that if an athlete loses their first round heat at a given event, they will be eliminated from that event. According to WSL CEO Ryan Crosby, this change is intended to create "higher stakes from day one, with every heat carrying real consequence throughout the season." Under the new system, there will instead be a qualifying round, where the lower-seeded surfers will compete to face the higher-seeded athletes in the main event. For the men, seeds 29-36 will take part in the qualifying event, while the top 28 seeded athletes will move straight to the second round. For women, seeds 9-24 will take part in the qualifying rounds.

On 25 May 2026, the final day of the championship in New Zealand was halted after one of the photographers, Ed Sloane, was attacked by an unknown sea creature. Renato Hickel, the vice president of tours and competition said: "At this stage we are not certain if it was a shark or a sea lion."

In October 2026, it was announced that Al Cleland Jr. had been suspended from competition following an incident at a party in Tahiti in August 2026. Cleland had missed the cut for the "postseason" events but was due to surf in the Pipe Masters in December. According to reporting, "The incident is understood to have occurred after the final day of the Outerknown Tahiti Pro and involved a teenaged Australian female surfer and at least three men." Reporting indicates that New South Wales police have been advised of the allegations and have been in contact with surfing authorities. The following day, Cleland's ex-girlfriend, German professional surfer Noah Klapp, publicly accused him of physical, sexual, and psychological abuse during their relationship. She received support on instagram from Kelly Slater, along with current WSL competitors Tyler Wright, Jordy Smith, Yago Dora, Gabriel Medina, Filipe Toledo, Luana Silva, and Miguel Pupo amongst others. Cleland’s sponsors, Quiksilver and Monster, subsequently removed him from their websites, and the WSL removed Cleland’s jersey from its online store.

== Qualified athletes ==
The first nine events of the 2026 Championship Tour will be contested by the WSL top 36 men and top 24 women. In November 2024, the WSL announced an expansion of the number of female participants in the 2026 World Championship Tour (CT), increasing the roster from 18 to 24 surfers.

The top 36 men consist of:

- The top 22 finishers from the 2025 Championship Tour rankings
- The top 10 finishers on the 2025 Challenger Series rankings
- Two WSL season wildcards
- Two event wildcards

The top 24 women consist of:

- The top 14 finishers on the 2025 Championship Tour rankings
- The top 7 finishers on the 2025 Challenger Series rankings
- Two WSL season wildcards
- One event wildcard

The first nine events will include 36 men and 24 women. After that, the field will be reduced to 24 men (top 22 competitors + 2 wildcards) and 16 women (top 14 competitors + 2 wildcards) for the final three postseason events in the Philippines, Abu Dhabi (prior to its cancellation) and Portugal. The top-ranked surfers will automatically requalify for the 2027 CT, as well as continue on to the second half of the Tour, where they will be joined by one men's and one women's season-long wildcard, and one men's and one women's event wildcard.*

=== 2026 Championship Tour qualifiers ===
2026 Championship Tour Qualifiers
Women	Men
Qualifiers from the 2025 Championship Tour
(Australia) Molly Picklum	(Brazil) Yago Dora
(United States) Caroline Marks	(United States) Griffin Colapinto
(Hawaii) Gabriela Bryan	(South Africa) Jordy Smith
(United States) Caitlin Simmers	(Brazil) Ítalo Ferreira
(Hawaii) Bettylou Sakura Johnson	(Australia) Jack Robinson
(Australia) Isabella Nichols	(Australia) Ethan Ewing
(Australia) Tyler Wright	(Japan) Kanoa Igarashi
(Canada) Erin Brooks	(Brazil) Filipe Toledo
(United States) Lakey Peterson	(Italy) Leonardo Fioravanti
(Brazil) Luana Silva	(United States) Cole Houshmand
(United States) Sawyer Lindblad	(Hawaii) Barron Mamiya
(France) Vahine Fierro	(Japan) Connor O'Leary
(United States) Bella Kenworthy	(Brazil) Miguel Pupo
(Costa Rica) Brisa Hennessy	(United States) Jake Marshall
	(United States) Crosby Colapinto
(France) Marco Mignot
(Brazil) João Chianca
(Australia) Joel Vaughan
(Mexico) Alan Cleland Jr.
(Indonesia) Rio Waida
(Hawaii) Seth Moniz
(Brazil) Alejo Muniz
Qualifiers from the 2025 Challenger Series
(France) Tya Zebrowski	(France) Kauli Vaast
(Portugal) Yolanda Hopkins	(Hawaii) Eli Hanneman
(Australia) Sally Fitzgibbons	(Australia) Morgan Cibilic
(United States) Alyssa Spencer	(Australia) George Pittar
(Portugal) Francisca Veselko	(Brazil) Samuel Pupo
(Basque Country (autonomous community)) Nadia Erostarbe	(Australia) Callum Robson
(Israel) Anat Lelior	(South Africa) Luke Thompson
	(Australia) Oscar Berry
(Brazil) Mateus Herdy
(Australia) Liam O'Brien
Season Wildcards
(Hawaii) Carissa Moore	(Brazil) Gabriel Medina
(Australia) Stephanie Gilmore	(Morocco) Ramzi Boukhiam
WSL Replacement
(Basque Country (autonomous community)) Annette Gonzalez Etxabarri	(South Africa) Matthew McGillivray

== Schedule ==
The 2026 Championship Tour brings some changes to the calendar. All stages from the 2025 season will continue in 2026, with only the order of events changing, with the exception of the event in Jeffreys Bay, South Africa, which has been replaced by the Corona Cero New Zealand in Raglan. The Australian leg that closed the mid-season cut is now the first three events of the CT.

The first nine events define the "regular-season", while Abu Dhabi, Philippines Pro and Portugal are considered the "postseason". Unlike in recent years, the WSL Finals is no longer the last event of the year. The Pipeline Masters is once again the event where the 2026 world champions will be decided, with all competitors rejoining for the event.

Round	Date	Event	Location
1	April 1–11	(Australia) Rip Curl Pro Bells Beach	Bells Beach, Victoria, Australia
2	April 16–26	Western Australia Margaret River Pro	Margaret River, Western Australia, Australia
3	May 2–12	(Australia) Bonsoy Gold Coast Pro	Gold Coast, Queensland, Australia
4	May 15–25	Corona Cero New Zealand Pro	Raglan, New Zealand
5	June 5–15	Surf City El Salvador Pro	Punta Roca, La Libertad, El Salvador
6	June 19–27	(Brazil) VIVO Rio Pro	Saquarema, Rio de Janeiro, Brazil
7	August 8–18	(French Polynesia) Outerknown Tahiti Pro	Teahupo'o, Tahiti, French Polynesia
8	August 25 – September 4	Fiji Pro	Cloudbreak, Tavarua, Fiji
9	September 11–20	(United States) Lexus Trestles Pro	Lower Trestles, San Clemente, California, United States
10	October 16–25	MEO Rip Curl Pro Portugal	Supertubos, Peniche, Portugal
11	October 31 - November 10	Philippines Pro	Cloud 9, General Luna, Surigao del Norte, Philippines
~~12~~	~~November 25–29~~	(United Arab Emirates) ~~Surf Abu Dhabi~~	~~Hudayriat Island, Abu Dhabi, United Arab Emirates~~
13	December 8–20	(Hawaii) Lexus Pipe Masters	Banzai Pipeline, Oahu, Hawaii

== Results and standings ==
=== Event results ===
Round	Event	Men's champion	Men's runner-up	Women's champion	Women's runner-up
1	(Australia) Rip Curl Pro Bells Beach	(Brazil) Miguel Pupo	(Brazil) Yago Dora	(Hawaii) Gabriela Bryan	(Australia) Molly Picklum
2	Western Australia Margaret River Pro	(Australia) George Pittar	(Brazil) Gabriel Medina	(United States) Lakey Peterson	(Brazil) Luana Silva
3	(Australia) Bonsoy Gold Coast Pro	(Australia) Ethan Ewing	(Japan) Connor O'Leary	(Australia) Stephanie Gilmore	(Brazil) Luana Silva
4	Corona Cero New Zealand Pro	(Brazil) Ítalo Ferreira	(Australia) Morgan Cibilic	(Hawaii) Carissa Moore	(United States) Sawyer Lindblad
5	Surf City El Salvador Pro	(Italy) Leonardo Fioravanti	(Brazil) Ítalo Ferreira	(Hawaii) Carissa Moore	(Australia) Tyler Wright
6	(Brazil) VIVO Rio Pro	(Brazil) Yago Dora	(Italy) Leonardo Fioravanti	(United States) Sawyer Lindblad	(France) Tya Zebrowski
7	(French Polynesia) Outerknown Tahiti Pro	(Hawaii) Seth Moniz	(United States) Griffin Colapinto	(Canada) Erin Brooks	(Israel) Anat Lelior
8	Fiji Pro	(United States) Cole Houshmand	(Brazil) Gabriel Medina	(Canada) Erin Brooks	(Australia) Isabella Nichols
9	(United States) Lexus Trestles Pro	(Brazil) Miguel Pupo	(Japan) Kanoa Igarashi	(Canada) Erin Brooks	(Hawaii) Gabriela Bryan
10	MEO Rip Curl Pro Portugal	(United States) Griffin Colapinto	(Brazil) Gabriel Medina	(Australia) Molly Picklum	(United States) Caitlin Simmers
11	Philippines Pro	(Brazil) Gabriel Medina	(Australia) Jack Robinson	(United States) Caitlin Simmers	(Australia) Isabella Nichols
12	(Hawaii) Lexus Pipe Masters				

=== Men's standings ===
Points are awarded using the following structure:

Regular season	1st	2nd	3rd	5th	9th	17th	33rd	INJ	WTD	PAR	DNC
Points	10,000	7,800	6,085	4,745	3,320	1,000	500	500	500	500	0

Postseason	1st	2nd	3rd	5th	9th	17th	INJ	WTD	PAR	DNC
Points	10,000	7,800	6,085	4,745	2,500	1,000	500	500	500	0

Final	1st	2nd	3rd	5th	9th	17th	25th	33rd	INJ	WTD	PAR	DNC
Points	15,000	11,700	9,125	7,115	4,980	3,240	1,500	750	750	750	750	0

Position	+/-	Surfer	(Australia) WCT 1	(Australia) WCT 2	(Australia) WCT 3	(New Zealand) WCT 4	(El Salvador) WCT 5	(Brazil) WCT 6	(French Polynesia) WCT 7	(Fiji) WCT 8	(United States) WCT 9	(Portugal) WCT 10	(Philippines) WCT 11	(Hawaii) WCT 12	Points
1	Steady	Yago Dora (BRA)	2nd	5th	~~17th~~	3rd	9th	1st	~~17th~~	5th	3rd	3rd	3rd	–	54,950
2	▲2	Gabriel Medina (BRA)	3rd	2nd	9th	9th	3rd	~~17th~~	~~17th~~	2nd	17th	2nd	1st	–	53,210
3	▼1	Ítalo Ferreira (BRA)	~~9th~~	3rd	9th	1st	2nd	9th	3rd	9th	9th	3rd	~~9th~~	–	49,335
4	▼1	Griffin Colapinto (USA)	3rd	9th	~~17th~~	3rd	~~17th~~	17th	2nd	3rd	9th	1st	9th	–	46,195
5	Steady	Miguel Pupo (BRA)	1st	9th	9th	5th	~~17th~~	5th	9th	9th	1st	~~9th~~	9th	–	45,270
6	Steady	Leonardo Fioravanti (ITA)	5th	9th	5th	9th	1st	2nd	~~17th~~	3rd	~~17th~~	9th	9th	–	45,015
7	Steady	Ethan Ewing (AUS)	~~17th~~	5th	1st	~~17th~~	17th	3rd	5th	17th	9th	5th	3rd	–	41,725
8	Steady	Kanoa Igarashi (JPN)	5th	9th	~~17th~~	9th	3rd	9th	~~17th~~	9th	2nd	9th	5th	–	39,155
9	▲3	Jack Robinson (AUS)	~~17th~~	9th	9th	9th	9th	9th	5th	~~17th~~	9th	9th	2nd	–	34,965
10	▲1	George Pittar (AUS)	9th	1st	9th	~~17th~~	~~17th~~	9th	5th	17th	17th	17th	5th	–	32,450
11	▼2	Kauli Vaast (FRA)	~~17th~~	~~17th~~	5th	17th	5th	5th	9th	5th	9th	9th	17th	–	30,120
12	▼2	Samuel Pupo (BRA)	5th	3rd	5th	~~17th~~	9th	5th	~~17th~~	9th	17th	17th	17th	–	29,960
13	Steady	Liam O'Brien (AUS)	~~33rd~~	9th	3rd	9th	9th	9th	9th	~~17th~~	9th	17th	9th	–	29,505
14	▲5	Seth Moniz (HAW)	~~17th~~	17th	17th	17th	17th	~~33rd~~	1st	9th	17th	5th	5th	–	27,810
15	▲1	Connor O'Leary (JPN)	~~17th~~	9th	2nd	~~17th~~	17th	17th	9th	5th	17th	9th	9th	–	27,185
16	▼2	Cole Houshmand (USA)	~~17th~~	~~17th~~	17th	5th	17th	17th	17th	1st	3rd	17th	17th	–	26,830
17	▼2	Marco Mignot (FRA)	9th	~~17th~~	9th	9th	5th	9th	~~17th~~	17th	5th	17th	17th	–	25,770
18	▼1	Morgan Cibilic (AUS)	~~17th~~	~~17th~~	17th	2nd	17th	5th	17th	9th	17th	5th	~~INJ~~	–	25,610
19	▲1	Filipe Toledo (BRA)	9th	~~17th~~	3rd	5th	~~17th~~	17th	17th	17th	17th	9th	5th	–	25,395
20	▼2	Callum Robson (AUS)	~~33rd~~	~~33rd~~	9th	17th	5th	9th	17th	5th	5th	17th	17th	–	24,875
21	Steady	João Chianca (BRA)	~~17th~~	9th	~~17th~~	17th	9th	3rd	9th	17th	17th	17th	17th	–	21,045
22	Steady	Jake Marshall (USA)	9th	~~17th~~	9th	17th	17th	17th	17th	9th	5th	17th	~~INJ~~	–	19,705
Cut after mid-season
23	Steady	Barron Mamiya (HAW)	5th	17th	17th	17th	9th	17th	9th	9th	17th	–	–	–	19,705
24	Steady	Alan Cleland (MEX)	17th	17th	17th	17th	5th	17th	5th	17th	9th	–	–	DNC	18,810
25	Steady	Crosby Colapinto (USA)	17th	5th	17th	9th	9th	17th	17th	17th	17th	–	–	–	17,385
26	Steady	Mateus Herdy (BRA)	17th	33rd	5th	17th	17th	17th	17th	17th	5th	–	–	–	15,990
27	Steady	Alejo Muniz (BRA)	9th	17th	17th	9th	17th	17th	9th	17th	17th	–	–	–	15,960
28	Steady	Rio Waida (INA)	9th	17th	17th	5th	17th	17th	17th	17th	17th	–	–	–	15,065
29	Steady	Ramzi Boukhiam (MAR)	33rd	17th	33rd	33rd	17th	17th	3rd	17th	17th	–	–	–	12,585
30	Steady	Joel Vaughan (AUS)	17th	5th	17th	17th	17th	17th	17th	17th	33rd	–	–	–	12,245
31	Steady	Eli Hanneman (HAW)	17th	17th	17th	17th	9th	17th	33rd	17th	17th	–	–	–	10,820
32	Steady	Luke Thompson (RSA)	17th	33rd	17th	17th	17th	33rd	17th	33rd	9th	–	–	–	9,820
33	Steady	Jordy Smith (RSA)	9th	17th	17th	17th	INJ	INJ	INJ	INJ	INJ	–	–	–	8,820
34	Steady	Matthew McGillivray (RSA)	–	–	–	–	33rd	9th	33rd	17th	33rd	–	–	–	5,820
35	Steady	Oscar Berry (AUS)	33rd	33rd	33rd	33rd	33rd	33rd	33rd	33rd	17th	–	–	–	5,000
WC	Steady	Dane Henry (AUS)	~~17th~~	–	–	–	–	–	–	–	–	–	–	–	0
WC	Steady	Xavier Huxtable (AUS)	~~17th~~	–	–	–	–	–	–	–	–	–	–	–	0
WC	Steady	Jacob Willcox (AUS)	–	~~17th~~	–	–	–	–	–	–	–	–	–	–	0
WC	Steady	Jack Thomas (AUS)	–	~~17th~~	–	–	–	–	–	–	–	–	–	–	0
WC	Steady	Reef Heazlewood (AUS)	–	–	~~33rd~~	–	–	–	–	–	–	–	–	–	0
WC	Steady	Winter Vicent (AUS)	–	–	~~33rd~~	–	–	–	–	–	–	–	–	–	0
WC	Steady	Tom Butland (NZL)	–	–	–	~~33rd~~	–	–	–	–	–	–	–	–	0
WC	Steady	Billy Stairmand (NZL)	–	–	–	~~33rd~~	–	–	–	–	–	–	–	–	0
WC	Steady	Melvin Ayala (ESA)	–	–	–	–	~~33rd~~	–	–	–	–	–	–	–	0
WC	Steady	Bryan Pérez (ESA)	–	–	–	–	~~33rd~~	–	–	–	–	–	–	–	0
WC	Steady	Lucas Chumbo (BRA)	–	–	–	–	–	~~33rd~~	–	–	–	–	–	–	0
WC	Steady	Weslley Dantas (BRA)	–	–	–	–	–	~~17th~~	–	–	–	–	–	–	0
WC	Steady	Eimeo Czermak (TAH)	–	–	–	–	–	–	~~33rd~~	–	–	–	–	–	0
WC	Steady	Kelly Slater (USA)	–	–	–	–	–	–	~~9th~~	–	–	–	–	–	0
WC	Steady	Teo Degei (FIJ)	–	–	–	–	–	–	–	~~33rd~~	–	–	–	–	0
WC	Steady	Jarvis Earle (AUS)	–	–	–	–	–	–	–	~~33rd~~	–	–	–	–	0
WC	Steady	Hayden Rodgers (USA)	–	–	–	–	–	–	–	–	~~33rd~~	–	–	–	0
WC	Steady	Taj Lindblad (USA)	–	–	–	–	–	–	–	–	~~33rd~~	–	–	–	0
WC	Steady	Frederico Morais (POR)	–	–	–	–	–	–	–	–	–	~~9th~~	–	–	0
WC	Steady	Guilherme Ribeiro (POR)	–	–	–	–	–	–	–	–	–	~~5th~~	–	–	0
WC	Steady	Bronson Meydi (INA)	–	–	–	–	–	–	–	–	–	–	~~17th~~	–	0
WC	Steady	Noah Arkfeld (PHI)	–	–	–	–	–	–	–	–	–	–	~~17th~~	–	0
WC	Steady	Jayuard Alciso (PHI)	–	–	–	–	–	–	–	–	–	–	~~9th~~	–	0
WC	Steady	John Mark Tokong (PHI)	–	–	–	–	–	–	–	–	–	–	~~9th~~	–	0

- Event wildcard surfers do not receive points. Their results on each event are indicated on the above table but no ranking points are awarded.

=== Women's standings ===
Points are awarded using the following structure:

Regular season	1st	2nd	3rd	5th	9th	17th	INJ	WTD	PAR	DNC
Points	10,000	7,800	6,085	4,745	2,000	1,000	1,000	1,000	1,000	0

Postseason	1st	2nd	3rd	5th	9th	INJ	WTD	PAR	DNC
Points	10,000	7,800	6,085	4,745	2,000	2,000	2,000	2,000	0

Final	1st	2nd	3rd	5th	9th	17th	INJ	WTD	PAR	DNC
Points	15,000	11,700	9,125	7,115	3,000	1,500	1,500	1,500	1,500	0

Position	+/-	Surfer	(Australia) WCT 1	(Australia) WCT 2	(Australia) WCT 3	(New Zealand) WCT 4	(El Salvador) WCT 5	(Brazil) WCT 6	(French Polynesia) WCT 7	(Fiji) WCT 8	(United States) WCT 9	(Portugal) WCT 10	(Philippines) WCT 11	(Hawaii) WCT 12	Points
1	Steady	Molly Picklum (AUS)	2nd	5th	5th	5th	3rd	~~9th~~	5th	~~9th~~	3rd	1st	5th	–	53,695
2	Steady	Carissa Moore (HAW)	~~9th~~	5th	~~9th~~	1st	1st	5th	9th	3rd	5th	5th	3rd	–	53,150
3	▲3	Caitlin Simmers (USA)	5th	3rd	5th	~~9th~~	5th	5th	5th	~~INJ~~	9th	2nd	1st	–	49,610
4	▼1	Gabriela Bryan (HAW)	1st	5th	5th	5th	3rd	5th	~~9th~~	~~9th~~	2nd	9th	9th	–	46,865
5	▼1	Erin Brooks (CAN)	9th	9th	~~17th~~	9th	~~17th~~	9th	1st	1st	1st	5th	9th	–	44,745
6	▼1	Sawyer Lindblad (USA)	~~17th~~	3rd	3rd	2nd	~~9th~~	1st	9th	9th	3rd	9th	9th	–	44,055
7	Steady	Luana Silva (BRA)	5th	2nd	2nd	~~9th~~	5th	5th	~~9th~~	9th	5th	9th	5th	–	43,325
8	Steady	Lakey Peterson (USA)	5th	1st	5th	~~9th~~	~~9th~~	9th	9th	5th	9th	3rd	9th	–	38,320
9	Steady	Isabella Nichols (AUS)	3rd	9th	9th	9th	~~17th~~	9th	3rd	2nd	~~INJ~~	INJ	2nd	–	36,770
10	Steady	Bettylou Sakura Johnson (HAW)	5th	9th	9th	3rd	9th	~~17th~~	~~17th~~	5th	17th	3rd	9th	–	30,660
11	▲1	Nadia Erostarbe (SPA)	9th	~~17th~~	3rd	~~17th~~	9th	3rd	5th	9th	17th	9th	5th	–	30,660
12	▼1	Caroline Marks (USA)	~~9th~~	5th	~~9th~~	5th	5th	3rd	9th	9th	9th	9th	9th	–	30,320
13	Steady	Tyler Wright (AUS)	9th	~~INJ~~	9th	5th	2nd	~~17th~~	17th	17th	9th	9th	3rd	–	28,630
14	Steady	Yolanda Hopkins (POR)	~~17th~~	9th	9th	~~17th~~	9th	17th	3rd	5th	9th	9th	5th	–	26,575
Cut after mid-season
15	Steady	Anat Lelior (ISR)	9th	17th	17th	17th	5th	17th	2nd	17th	17th	–	–	–	20,545
16	Steady	Alyssa Spencer (USA)	3rd	17th	17th	3rd	17th	17th	9th	17th	17th	–	–	–	20,170
17	Steady	Stephanie Gilmore (AUS)	17th	17th	1st	9th	17th	17th	17th	17th	17th	–	–	–	19,000
18	Steady	Brisa Hennessy (CRC)	17th	17th	17th	17th	9th	9th	9th	3rd	9th	–	–	–	18,085
19	Steady	Tya Zebrowski (FRA)	17th	17th	17th	9th	17th	2nd	17th	17th	9th	–	–	–	17,800
20	Steady	Vahine Fierro (FRA)	17th	9th	9th	9th	17th	17th	17th	5th	9th	–	–	–	16,745
21	▼1	Sally Fitzgibbons (AUS)	9th	9th	9th	17th	9th	9th	17th	9th	17th	–	–	–	15,000
22	▼1	Bella Kenworthy (USA)	17th	17th	17th	17th	9th	9th	17th	17th	5th	–	–	–	14,745
23	▲1	Francisca Veselko (POR)	9th	9th	17th	17th	17th	17th	17th	9th	17th	~~5th~~	–	–	12,000
WC	Steady	Ellie Harrison (AUS)	~~17th~~	–	–	–	–	–	–	–	–	–	–	–	0
WC	Steady	Bronte Macaulay (AUS)	–	~~17th~~	–	–	–	–	–	–	–	–	–	–	0
WC	Steady	Sophie McCulloch (AUS)	–	~~9th~~	–	–	–	–	–	~~17th~~	–	–	–	–	0
WC	Steady	Dimity Stoyle (AUS)	–	–	~~17th~~	–	–	–	–	–	–	–	–	–	0
WC	Steady	Alani Morse (NZL)	–	–	–	~~17th~~	–	–	–	–	–	–	–	–	0
WC	Steady	Kirra Pinkerton (USA)	–	–	–	–	~~17th~~	–	–	–	–	–	–	–	0
WC	Steady	Tatiana Weston-Webb (BRA)	–	–	–	–	–	~~9th~~	–	–	–	–	–	–	0
WC	Steady	Kelia Gallina (TAH)	–	–	–	–	–	–	~~5th~~	–	–	–	–	–	0
WC	Steady	Ulukilupetea Kurop (FIJ)	–	–	–	–	–	–	–	~~17th~~	–	–	–	–	0
WC	Steady	Kirra Pinkerton (USA)	–	–	–	–	–	–	–	–	~~17th~~	–	–	–	0
WC	Steady	Eden Walla (USA)	–	–	–	–	–	–	–	–	~~5th~~	–	–	–	0
WC	Steady	Johanne Defay (FRA)	–	–	–	–	–	–	–	–	–	~~9th~~	–	–	0
WC	Steady	Teresa Bonvalot (POR)	–	–	–	–	–	–	–	–	–	~~5th~~	–	–	0
WC	Steady	Sierra Kerr (AUS)	–	–	–	–	–	–	–	–	–	–	~~9th~~	–	0
WC	Steady	Mara Lopez (PHI)	–	–	–	–	–	–	–	–	–	–	~~9th~~	–	0

- Event wildcard surfers do not receive points. Their results on each event are indicated on the above table but no ranking points are awarded.

== See also ==
- 2026 ISA World Surfing Games
