= Erin Brooks =

American-Canadian professional surfer

Personal information
- Born: 17 July 2007 (age 19) Boerne, Texas, United States

Surfing career
- Sport: Surfing
- Major achievements: 2023 ISA World Surfing Games - Runner-up; WSL Championship Tour event wins: 4; 2025 WSL Rookie of the Year

Surfing specifications
- Stance: Goofy
- Shaper: Matt Biolos (Lost Surfboards)
Medal record
Women's surfing
Representing Canada
World Games
Silver medal – second place	2023 La Bocana	Women

Erin Brooks (born 17 July 2007) is an American and Canadian professional surfer who competes for Canada.

== Career ==
In 2023, aged 15, Brooks was runner-up in the ISA Games, losing the final to Tatiana Weston-Webb.

Brooks applied for Canadian citizenship in 2023 through her Canadian-born grandfather but her application was denied because Canadian nationality law limited citizenship by descent to the first generation born abroad. The following year, after the Ontario Superior Court of Justice ruled that the first generation limit was unconstitutional, Brooks refiled and was granted citizenship.

In 2024, in the last stage before the WSL Finals, Brooks competed as a guest and won the Corona Fiji Pro, beating Caitlin Simmers in the quarterfinals, Molly Picklum in the semi-finals and Olympic silver medalist Tatiana Weston-Webb. Brooks came 4th place in the 2024 Challenger Series and secured a spot in the 2025 CT, making her first appearance in the world surfing elite at 17 years old.

== Career victories ==
WCT Wins
Year	Event	Venue	Country
2026	Lexus Trestles Pro	Trestles, California	United States
2026	Fiji Pro	Cloudbreak, Tavarua	Fiji
2026	Outerknown Tahiti Pro	Teahupo'o, Tahiti	French Polynesia
2024	Corona Fiji Pro	Cloudbreak, Tavarua	Fiji
WSL Challenger Series Wins
Year	Event	Venue	Country
2024	Bonsoy Gold Coast Pro	Gold Coast, Queensland	Australia
2023	Corona Saquarema Pro	Saquarema, Rio de Janeiro	Brazil
WQS Wins
Year	Event	Venue	Country
2023	The Hawaiian Islands HIC Haleiwa Pro	Haleiwa, Oahu	Hawaii
