= 2025 World Surf League =

Professional surfing league season

- Location: Hawaii, United Arab Emirates, Portugal, El Salvador, Australia, United States, Brazil, South Africa, French Polynesia, Fiji
- Dates: January 27th 2025 – September 4th 2025

Champions
- Men: (Brazil) Yago Dora
- Women: (Australia) Molly Picklum

The 2025 World Surf League was the 48th season of all iterations of the tour circuit for professional surfers. Billabong Pipe Masters was the first round of the tour.

For the first time, the season ended at Cloudbreak, in Tavarua Island, Fiji, where the WSL Finals determined that season World Champions. It was the first time the WSL Finals has moved locations since its debut in 2021.

John John Florence and Caitlin Simmers were the defending champions. Florence announced on January of that year his withdrawal from the starting season, allowing rookie Alan Cleland to take his spot on the CT. Eight time World Title holder Stephanie Gilmore also not competed in the 2025 WSL CT. Brazil's Yago Dora on men's side and Australia's Molly Picklum on women's were crowned world champions for the first time.

The 2025 CT included eleven regular-season events in nine countries. The Mid-season cut came into action following stop number seven in Margaret River, Australia. Surfers who made the cut competed in the United States, Brazil and South Africa. The final event of the regular season was at Teahupo'o in Tahiti, where the 2024 Olympic Final took place. The surfers competed for a place in the WSL Finals.

== Qualifier athletes ==
The first seven events of the 2025 Championship Tour will be contested by the WSL top 36 men and top 18 women.

The top 36 men consist of:

- The top 22 finishers from the 2024 Championship Tour rankings
- The top 10 finishers on the 2024 Challenger Series rankings
- Two WSL season wildcards
- Two event wildcards

The top 18 women consist of:

- The top 10 finishers on the 2024 Championship Tour rankings
- The top 5 finishers on the 2024 Challenger Series rankings
- Two WSL season wildcards
- One event wildcard

The 2025 CT season will start with 36 men and 18 women. Halfway through the season, the field will be reduced to 22 men and 10 women. The top-ranked surfers will automatically requalify for the 2026 CT, as well as continue on to the second half of the Tour, where they will be joined by one men's and one women's season-long wildcard, and one men's and one women's event wildcard.

=== Women's 2025 Championship Tour qualifiers ===
Top 10 Qualifiers from 2024 Championship Tour Rankings

- Caitlin Simmers (USA)
- Caroline Marks (USA)
- Tatiana Weston-Webb (BRA)
- Brisa Hennessy (CRC)
- Molly Picklum (AUS)
- Johanne Defay (FRA)
- Gabriela Bryan (HAW)
- Sawyer Lindblad (USA)
- Bettylou Sakura Johnson (HAW)
- Tyler Wright (AUS)

Top 5 Qualifiers from 2024 Challenger Series Rankings

- Sally Fitzgibbons (AUS)
- Bella Kenworthy (USA)
- Isabella Nichols (AUS)
- Erin Brooks (CAN)
- Vahiné Fierro (FRA)

WSL Season Wildcards

- Lakey Peterson (USA)
- Luana Silva (BRA)

WSL Replacement

- Nadia Erostarbe (BAQ)

=== Men's 2025 Championship Tour qualifiers ===
Top 22 Qualifiers from 2024 Championship Tour Rankings

- ~~John John Florence (HAW)~~ *
- Italo Ferreira (BRA)
- Griffin Colapinto (USA)
- Jack Robinson (AUS)
- Ethan Ewing (AUS)
- Yago Dora (BRA)
- Gabriel Medina (BRA)
- Jordy Smith (RSA)
- Rio Waida (INA)
- Crosby Colapinto (USA)
- Jake Marshall (USA)
- Ramzi Boukhiam (MAR)
- Ryan Callinan (AUS)
- Barron Mamiya (HAW)
- Cole Houshmand (USA)
- Connor O'Leary (JPN)
- Kanoa Igarashi (JPN)
- Imaikalani deVault (HAW)
- Seth Moniz (HAW)
- Matthew McGillivray (RSA)
- Liam O'Brien (AUS)
- Leonardo Fioravanti (ITA)
- Samuel Pupo (BRA)

Top 10 Qualifiers from 2024 Challenger Series Rankings

- Ian Gouveia (BRA)
- Marco Mignot (FRA)
- Alejo Muniz (BRA)
- Deivid Silva (BRA)
- Miguel Pupo (BRA)
- Joel Vaughan (AUS)
- George Pittar (AUS)
- Edgard Groggia (BRA)
- Jackson Bunch (HAW)
- Alan Cleland (MEX)

WSL Season Wildcards

- Joao Chianca (BRA)
- Filipe Toledo (BRA)

WSL Replacement

- Ian Gentil (HAW)

== Schedule ==
The 2025 season will include returns of both new and returning events, such as Snapper Rocks on the Gold Coast returning after five years, and J-Bay in South Africa. Trestles will no longer be the venue for the WSL Finals, which will be held in Fiji for the first time, while Abu Dhabi, UAE and its largest and longest wave pools in the world enter the CT for the first time.

| Round | Date | Event | Location |
|---|---|---|---|
| 1 | January 27 – February 8 | (Hawaii) Lexus Pipe Pro | Banzai Pipeline, Oahu, Hawaii |
| 2 | February 14–16 | (United Arab Emirates) Surf Abu Dhabi Pro | Hudayriat Island, Abu Dhabi, United Arab Emirates |
| 3 | March 15–25 | MEO Rip Curl Pro Portugal | Supertubos, Peniche, Portugal |
| 4 | April 2–12 | Surf City El Salvador Pro | Punta Roca, La Libertad, El Salvador |
| 5 | April 18–28 | (Australia) Rip Curl Pro Bells Beach | Bells Beach, Victoria, Australia |
| 6 | May 3–13 | (Australia) Bonsoy Gold Coast Pro | Gold Coast, Queensland, Australia |
| 7 | May 17–27 | Western Australia Margaret River Pro | Margaret River, Western Australia, Australia |
| 8 | June 9–17 | (United States) Lexus Trestles Pro | San Clemente, California, United States |
| 9 | June 21–29 | (Brazil) VIVO Rio Pro | Saquarema, Rio de Janeiro, Brazil |
| 10 | July 11–20 | (South Africa) Corona Cero Open J-Bay | Jeffreys Bay, Eastern Cape, South Africa |
| 11 | August 7–16 | (French Polynesia) Lexus Tahiti Pro | Teahupo'o, Tahiti, French Polynesia |
| 12 | August 27 – September 4 | Lexus WSL Finals Fiji | Cloudbreak, Tavarua, Fiji |

== Results and standings ==
=== Event results ===
| Round | Event | Men's champion | Men's runner-up | Women's champion | Women's runner-up |
|---|---|---|---|---|---|
| 1 | (Hawaii) Lexus Pipe Pro | (Hawaii) Barron Mamiya | (Italy) Leonardo Fioravanti | (Australia) Tyler Wright | (United States) Caitlin Simmers |
| 2 | (United Arab Emirates) Surf Abu Dhabi Pro | (Brazil) Ítalo Ferreira | (Indonesia) Rio Waida | (United States) Caitlin Simmers | (Australia) Molly Picklum |
| 3 | MEO Rip Curl Pro Portugal | (Brazil) Yago Dora | (Brazil) Ítalo Ferreira | (United States) Caroline Marks | (Hawaii) Gabriela Bryan |
| 4 | Surf City El Salvador Pro | (South Africa) Jordy Smith | (South Africa) Matthew McGillivray | (Hawaii) Gabriela Bryan | (Australia) Isabella Nichols |
| 5 | (Australia) Rip Curl Pro Bells Beach | (Australia) Jack Robinson | (Japan) Kanoa Igarashi | (Australia) Isabella Nichols | (Brazil) Luana Silva |
| 6 | (Australia) Bonsoy Gold Coast Pro | (Brazil) Filipe Toledo | (Australia) Julian Wilson | (Hawaii) Bettylou Sakura Johnson | (Australia) Sally Fitzgibbons |
| 7 | Western Australia Margaret River Pro | (South Africa) Jordy Smith | (United States) Griffin Colapinto | (Hawaii) Gabriela Bryan | (United States) Caitlin Simmers |
| 8 | (United States) Lexus Trestles Pro | (Brazil) Yago Dora | (Japan) Kanoa Igarashi | (Hawaii) Bettylou Sakura Johnson | (Australia) Molly Picklum |
| 9 | (Brazil) VIVO Rio Pro | (United States) Cole Houshmand | (United States) Griffin Colapinto | (Australia) Molly Picklum | (Brazil) Luana Silva |
| 10 | (South Africa) Corona Cero Open J-Bay | (Japan) Connor O'Leary | (Brazil) Yago Dora | (Hawaii) Gabriela Bryan | (Australia) Molly Picklum |
| 11 | (French Polynesia) Lexus Tahiti Pro | (Australia) Jack Robinson | (United States) Griffin Colapinto | (Australia) Molly Picklum | (United States) Caitlin Simmers |
| 12 | Lexus WSL Finals Fiji | (Brazil) Yago Dora | (United States) Griffin Colapinto | (Australia) Molly Picklum | (United States) Caroline Marks |

=== Men's standings ===
Points are awarded using the following structure:

| Position | 1st | 2nd | 3rd | 5th | 9th | 17th | 33rd | INJ | WTD | PAR | DNC |
|---|---|---|---|---|---|---|---|---|---|---|---|
| Points | 10,000 | 7,800 | 6,085 | 4,745 | 3,320 | 1,330 | 265 | 265 | 265 | 265 | 0 |

| Position | +/- | Surfer | (Hawaii) WCT 1 | (United Arab Emirates) WCT 2 | (Portugal) WCT 3 | (El Salvador) WCT 4 | (Australia) WCT 5 | (Australia) WCT 6 | (Australia) WCT 7 | (United States) WCT 8 | (Brazil) WCT 9 | (South Africa) WCT 10 | (French Polynesia) WCT 11 | (Fiji) Finals | Points |
|---|---|---|---|---|---|---|---|---|---|---|---|---|---|---|---|
| 1 | Steady | Yago Dora (BRA) | ~~33rd~~ | 5th | 1st | 5th | 9th | 5th | 17th | 1st | 5th | 2nd | 9th | 1st | 54,750 |
| 2 | 1 | Griffin Colapinto (USA) | ~~17th~~ | 9th | 17th | 17th | 3rd | 17th | 2nd | 3rd | 2nd | 3rd | 2nd | 2nd | 48,965 |
| 3 | 1 | Jordy Smith (RSA) | ~~17th~~ | 9th | 9th | 1st | 5th | 5th | 1st | 9th | 5th | 9th | 9th | 3rd | 50,835 |
| 4 | 1 | Ítalo Ferreira (BRA) | 3rd | 1st | 2nd | 5th | ~~17th~~ | 17th | 17th | 9th | 5th | 9th | 5th | 4th | 47,420 |
| 5 | 1 | Jack Robinson (AUS) | 17th | 3rd | 5th | 17th | 1st | ~~33rd~~ | 17th | 3rd | 9th | 9th | 1st | 5th | 47,545 |
| 6 | Steady | Ethan Ewing (AUS) | 9th | 3rd | 3rd | 5th | 5th | ~~17th~~ | 17th | 5th | 3rd | 5th | 5th | – | 46,630 |
| 7 | Steady | Kanoa Igarashi (JPN) | 9th | 5th | 9th | ~~17th~~ | 2nd | 3rd | 9th | 2nd | 9th | 5th | 17th | – | 45,785 |
| 8 | Steady | Filipe Toledo (BRA) | 9th | 9th | 5th | ~~17th~~ | 9th | 1st | 17th | 9th | 9th | 3rd | 17th | – | 40,090 |
| 9 | Steady | Leonardo Fioravanti (ITA) | 2nd | ~~17th~~ | 9th | 9th | 9th | 17th | 5th | 9th | 9th | 5th | 9th | – | 38,540 |
| 10 | Steady | Cole Houshmand (USA) | ~~17th~~ | 17th | 9th | 3rd | 17th | 17th | 17th | 5th | 1st | 9th | 5th | – | 37,535 |
| 11 | Steady | Barron Mamiya (HAW) | 1st | ~~17th~~ | 3rd | 17th | 17th | 9th | 3rd | 9th | 17th | 9th | 17th | – | 37,450 |
| 12 | Steady | Connor O'Leary (JPN) | ~~17th~~ | 9th | 17th | 9th | 9th | 17th | 5th | 5th | 17th | 1st | 17th | – | 34,770 |
| 13 | Steady | Miguel Pupo (BRA) | 5th | 5th | ~~17th~~ | 5th | 17th | 5th | 9th | 17th | 3rd | 17th | 17th | – | 33,705 |
| 14 | Steady | Jake Marshall (USA) | 5th | ~~17th~~ | 17th | 17th | 5th | 9th | 9th | 9th | 5th | 9th | 9th | – | 33,495 |
| 15 | Steady | Crosby Colapinto (USA) | ~~INJ~~ | INJ | 17th | 3rd | 17th | 17th | 3rd | 9th | 9th | 9th | 3rd | – | 32,470 |
| 16 | Steady | Marco Mignot (FRA) | 17th | ~~33rd~~ | 5th | 9th | 17th | 9th | 9th | 17th | 17th | 5th | 9th | – | 28,090 |
| 17 | Steady | João Chianca (BRA) | 9th | 17th | ~~33rd~~ | 9th | 17th | 9th | 9th | 9th | 17th | 9th | 9th | – | 27,230 |
| 18 | Steady | Joel Vaughan (AUS) | 9th | 9th | 9th | 17th | 9th | ~~33rd~~ | 17th | 5th | 9th | 17th | 17th | – | 26,665 |
| 19 | Steady | Alan Cleland (MEX) | 9th | ~~33rd~~ | 17th | 9th | 17th | 9th | 9th | 17th | 9th | 17th | 9th | – | 25,240 |
| 20 | Steady | Rio Waida (INA) | ~~17th~~ | 2nd | 5th | 17th | 17th | 17th | 17th | 17th | 17th | 17th | 9th | – | 25,175 |
| 21 | Steady | Seth Moniz (HAW) | 9th | ~~33rd~~ | 9th | 17th | 9th | 9th | 33rd | 17th | 9th | 17th | 17th | – | 22,185 |
| 22 | Steady | Alejo Muniz (BRA) | 17th | 17th | 17th | 9th | 17th | 3rd | ~~33rd~~ | 17th | 17th | 17th | INJ | – | 20,045 |
Cut after mid-season
| 23 | Steady | Matthew McGillivray (RSA) | 17th | 17th | 17th | 2nd | 17th | ~~33rd~~ | 17th | – | – | ~~17th~~ | – | – | 14,450 |
| 24 | Steady | Liam O'Brien (AUS) | 17th | 9th | 9th | ~~33rd~~ | 17th | 9th | 17th | – | – | – | – | – | 13,950 |
| 25 | Steady | Jackson Bunch (HAW) | ~~17th~~ | 5th | 17th | 17th | 17th | 17th | 9th | – | – | – | – | – | 13,385 |
| 26 | Steady | George Pittar (AUS) | 5th | 17th | ~~33rd~~ | 9th | 17th | 17th | 17th | – | – | – | – | – | 13,385 |
| 27 | Steady | Ian Gouveia (BRA) | 3rd | 17th | ~~33rd~~ | 17th | 33rd | 17th | 17th | – | – | – | – | – | 11,670 |
| 28 | Steady | Samuel Pupo (BRA) | ~~33rd~~ | 17th | 17th | 17th | 5th | 17th | 17th | – | – | – | – | – | 11,395 |
| 29 | Steady | Imaikalani deVault (HAW) | ~~33rd~~ | 33rd | 9th | 33rd | 17th | 17th | 5th | – | – | – | – | – | 11,255 |
| 30 | Steady | Deivid Silva (BRA) | 17th | 9th | 17th | 17th | ~~33rd~~ | 9th | 33rd | – | – | – | – | – | 10,895 |
| 31 | Steady | Ian Gentil (HAW) | 17th | 17th | 17th | ~~33rd~~ | 9th | 17th | 17th | – | – | – | – | – | 9,970 |
| 32 | Steady | Ramzi Boukhiam (MAR) | 17th | 17th | 17th | 9th | 33rd | INJ | ~~INJ~~ | – | – | – | – | – | 7,840 |
| 33 | Steady | Edgard Groggia (BRA) | 17th | 17th | 17th | ~~33rd~~ | 33rd | 17th | 17th | – | – | – | – | – | 6,915 |
| 34 | Steady | Ryan Callinan (AUS) | 17th | 17th | ~~INJ~~ | 17th | 17th | PAR | 33rd | – | – | – | – | – | 5,850 |
| 35 | Steady | Gabriel Medina (BRA) | ~~INJ~~ | INJ | INJ | INJ | INJ | INJ | INJ | – | – | – | – | – | 1,590 |
| WC | Steady | John John Florence (HAW) (WDN) | ~~9th~~ | – | – | – | – | – | – | – | – | – | – | – | 0 |
| WC | Steady | Eli Hanneman (HAW) | ~~33rd~~ | – | – | – | – | – | – | – | – | – | – | – | 0 |
| WC | Steady | Kelly Slater (USA) | ~~5th~~ | – | – | – | – | – | – | ~~17th~~ | – | – | – | – | 0 |
| WC | Steady | Bronson Meydi (INA) | – | ~~17th~~ | – | – | – | – | – | – | – | – | – | – | 0 |
| WC | Steady | Kauli Vaast (FRA) | – | ~~17th~~ | – | – | – | – | – | – | – | – | ~~5th~~ | – | 0 |
| WC | Steady | Mateus Herdy (BRA) | – | ~~9th~~ | – | – | – | – | – | – | – | – | – | – | 0 |
| WC | Steady | Frederico Morais (POR) | – | – | ~~33rd~~ | – | – | – | – | – | – | – | – | – | 0 |
| WC | Steady | Gatien Delahaye (FRA) | – | – | ~~17th~~ | – | – | – | – | – | – | – | – | – | 0 |
| WC | Steady | Jorgann Couzinet (FRA) | – | – | ~~17th~~ | – | – | – | – | – | – | – | – | – | 0 |
| WC | Steady | Levi Slawson (USA) | – | – | – | ~~17th~~ | – | – | – | – | – | – | – | – | 0 |
| WC | Steady | Bryan Perez (ESA) | – | – | – | ~~17th~~ | – | – | – | – | – | – | – | – | 0 |
| WC | Steady | Xavier Huxtable (AUS) | – | – | – | – | ~~9th~~ | – | – | – | – | – | – | – | 0 |
| WC | Steady | Morgan Cibilic (AUS) | – | – | – | – | ~~3rd~~ | ~~5th~~ | – | – | – | – | – | – | 0 |
| WC | Steady | Jordan Lawler (AUS) | – | – | – | – | – | ~~33rd~~ | – | – | – | – | – | – | 0 |
| WC | Steady | Callum Robson (AUS) | – | – | – | – | – | ~~17th~~ | – | – | – | – | – | – | 0 |
| WC | Steady | Julian Wilson (AUS) | – | – | – | – | – | ~~2nd~~ | – | – | – | – | – | – | 0 |
| WC | Steady | Winter Vincent (AUS) | – | – | – | – | – | – | ~~17th~~ | – | – | – | – | – | 0 |
| WC | Steady | Mikey McDonagh (AUS) | – | – | – | – | – | – | ~~9th~~ | – | – | – | – | – | 0 |
| WC | Steady | Jacob Willcox (AUS) | – | – | – | – | – | – | ~~5th~~ | – | – | – | – | – | 0 |
| WC | Steady | Dimitri Poulos (USA) | – | – | – | – | – | – | – | ~~17th~~ | – | – | – | – | 0 |
| WC | Steady | Gabriel Klaussner (BRA) | – | – | – | – | – | – | – | – | ~~17th~~ | – | – | – | 0 |
| WC | Steady | Peterson Crisanto (BRA) | – | – | – | – | – | – | – | – | ~~17th~~ | – | – | – | 0 |
| WC | Steady | Luke Thompson (RSA) | – | – | – | – | – | – | – | – | – | ~~17th~~ | – | – | 0 |
| WC | Steady | Teiva Tairoa (PYF) | – | – | – | – | – | – | – | – | – | – | ~~17th~~ | – | 0 |
| WC | Steady | Mihimana Braye (PYF) | – | – | – | – | – | – | – | – | – | – | ~~3rd~~ | – | 0 |

- Event wildcard surfers do not receive points. Their results on each event are indicated on the above table but no ranking points are awarded.
- John John Florence received WC 2026, due to his withdrawal from CT 2025.

=== Women's standings ===
Points are awarded using the following structure:

| Position | 1st | 2nd | 3rd | 5th | 9th | 17th | INJ | WTD | PAR | DNC |
|---|---|---|---|---|---|---|---|---|---|---|
| Points | 10,000 | 7,800 | 6,085 | 4,745 | 2,610 | 1,045 | 1,045 | 1,045 | 1,045 | 0 |

| Position | +/- | Surfer | (Hawaii) WCT 1 | (United Arab Emirates) WCT 2 | (Portugal) WCT 3 | (El Salvador) WCT 4 | (Australia) WCT 5 | (Australia) WCT 6 | (Australia) WCT 7 | (United States) WCT 8 | (Brazil) WCT 9 | (South Africa) WCT 10 | (French Polynesia) WCT 11 | (Fiji) Finals | Points |
|---|---|---|---|---|---|---|---|---|---|---|---|---|---|---|---|
| 1 | Steady | Molly Picklum (AUS) | 3rd | 2nd | 3rd | 3rd | ~~9th~~ | 5th | 5th | 2nd | 1st | 2nd | 1st | 1st | 71,145 |
| 2 | 2 | Caroline Marks (USA) | 5th | 5th | 1st | ~~9th~~ | 9th | 9th | 9th | 5th | 3rd | 3rd | 3rd | 2nd | 50,320 |
| 3 | 1 | Gabriela Bryan (HAW) | ~~9th~~ | 3rd | 2nd | 1st | 5th | 9th | 1st | 5th | 9th | 1st | 3rd | 3rd | 64,680 |
| 4 | 1 | Caitlin Simmers (USA) | 2nd | 1st | 5th | 3rd | ~~9th~~ | 9th | 2nd | 3rd | 9th | 5th | 2nd | 4th | 60,280 |
| 5 | Steady | Bettylou Sakura Johnson (HAW) | ~~9th~~ | 9th | 9th | 5th | 5th | 1st | 9th | 1st | 9th | 5th | 5th | 5th | 49,420 |
| 6 | Steady | Isabella Nichols (AUS) | 5th | ~~17th~~ | 9th | 2nd | 1st | 5th | 5th | 9th | 9th | 3rd | 9th | – | 48,560 |
| 7 | Steady | Tyler Wright (AUS) | 1st | ~~9th~~ | 5th | 9th | 3rd | 9th | 9th | 9th | 5th | 5th | 5th | – | 45.505 |
| 8 | Steady | Erin Brooks (CAN) | ~~9th~~ | 5th | 3rd | 9th | 9th | 3rd | 9th | 5th | 3rd | 9th | 5th | – | 42,930 |
| 9 | Steady | Lakey Peterson (USA) | 3rd | ~~9th~~ | 9th | 9th | 5th | 9th | 3rd | 5th | 5th | 5th | 9th | – | 41,590 |
| 10 | Steady | Luana Silva (BRA) | ~~9th~~ | 9th | 9th | 9th | 2nd | 5th | 5th | 9th | 2nd | 9th | 9th | – | 40,750 |
Cut after mid-season
| 11 | Steady | Sawyer Lindblad (USA) | 5th | 5th | ~~9th~~ | 5th | 9th | 9th | 5th | ~~3rd~~ | – | – | – | – | 24,200 |
| 12 | Steady | Vahine Fierro (FRA) | 9th | 3rd | 9th | 9th | ~~17th~~ | 3rd | 9th | – | – | – | ~~5th~~ | – | 22,610 |
| 13 | Steady | Bella Kenworthy (USA) | ~~17th~~ | 5th | 5th | 5th | 9th | 9th | 9th | – | – | – | – | – | 22,065 |
| 14 | Steady | Brisa Hennessy (CRC) | 5th | 9th | ~~17th~~ | 5th | 3rd | 17th | 9th | – | – | – | – | – | 21,840 |
| 15 | Steady | Sally Fitzgibbons (AUS) | ~~17th~~ | 9th | 9th | 17th | 5th | 2nd | 9th | – | – | – | – | – | 21,420 |
| 16 | Steady | Johanne Defay (FRA) | INJ | 9th | 5th | PAR | PAR | PAR | ~~PAR~~ | – | – | – | – | – | 11,535 |
| 17 | Steady | Tatiana Weston-Webb (BRA) | 9th | 9th | 17th | INJ | INJ | INJ | ~~INJ~~ | – | ~~5th~~ | – | – | – | 9,400 |
| 18 | Steady | Nadia Erostarbe (Basque Country) | 9th | – | – | 17th | 9th | 17th | 17th | – | – | – | – | – | 8,355 |
| WC | Steady | Moana Jones Wong (HAW) | ~~9th~~ | – | – | – | – | – | – | – | – | – | – | – | 0 |
| WC | Steady | Macy Callaghan (AUS) | – | ~~17th~~ | – | – | – | – | – | – | – | – | – | – | 0 |
| WC | Steady | Yolanda Hopkins (POR) | – | – | ~~9th~~ | – | – | – | – | – | – | – | – | – | 0 |
| WC | Steady | Alyssa Spencer (USA) | – | – | – | ~~9th~~ | – | – | – | – | – | – | – | – | 0 |
| WC | Steady | Kirra Pinkerton (USA) | – | – | – | ~~9th~~ | – | – | – | ~~9th~~ | – | – | – | – | 0 |
| WC | Steady | Carly Shanahan (AUS) | – | – | – | – | ~~17th~~ | – | – | – | – | – | – | – | 0 |
| WC | Steady | Ellie Harrison (AUS) | – | – | – | – | ~~9th~~ | – | – | – | – | – | – | – | 0 |
| WC | Steady | Sophie McCulloch (AUS) | – | – | – | – | – | ~~9th~~ | – | – | – | – | – | – | 0 |
| WC | Steady | Stephanie Gilmore (AUS) | – | – | – | – | – | ~~5th~~ | – | – | – | – | – | – | 0 |
| WC | Steady | Willow Hardy (AUS) | – | – | – | – | – | – | ~~17th~~ | – | – | – | – | – | 0 |
| WC | Steady | Bronte Macaulay (AUS) | – | – | – | – | – | – | ~~3rd~~ | – | – | – | – | – | 0 |
| WC | Steady | Arena Rodriguez (PER) | – | – | – | – | – | – | – | – | ~~5th~~ | – | – | – | 0 |
| WC | Steady | Sarah Baum (RSA) | – | – | – | – | – | – | – | – | – | ~~9th~~ | – | – | 0 |
| WC | Steady | Francisca Veselko (POR) | – | – | – | – | – | – | – | – | – | ~~9th~~ | – | – | 0 |
| WC | Steady | Kelia Gallina (PYF) | – | – | – | – | – | – | – | – | – | – | ~~9th~~ | – | 0 |

- Event wildcard surfers do not receive points. Their results on each event are indicated on the above table but no ranking points are awarded.

== Challenger Series ==
=== 2025 Men's Challenger Series ===
| Round | Event | Men's champion | Men's runner-up |
|---|---|---|---|
| 1 | (Australia) Burton Automotive Newcastle SURFEST | (Australia) Jacob Willcox | (France) Kauli Vaast |
| 2 | (South Africa) Ballito Pro | (South Africa) Luke Thompson | (Australia) George Pittar |
| 3 | (United States) Lexus US Open of Surfing | (United States) Levi Slawson | (Brazil) Mateus Herdy |
| 4 | (Portugal) EDP Ericeira Pro | (France) Kauli Vaast | (Australia) George Pittar |
| 5 | (Brazil) Banco do Brasil Saquarema Pro | (Brazil) Samuel Pupo | (Hawaii) Eli Hanneman |
| 6 | (Hawaii) Lexus Pipe Challenger | (Australia) Callum Robson | (Australia) Morgan Cibilic |
| 7 | (Australia) Bioglan Newcastle SURFEST | (Australia) Alister Reginato | (France) Kauli Vaast |

| Position | 1st | 2nd | 3rd | 5th | 9th | 17th | 25th | 33rd | 49th | 65th | 73rd |
|---|---|---|---|---|---|---|---|---|---|---|---|
| Points | 10,000 | 7,800 | 6,085 | 4,745 | 3,320 | 1,900 | 1,700 | 700 | 600 | 300 | 250 |

| Ranking | +/- | Surfer | Events | | | | | | | Points |
| Ranking | +/- | Surfer | (Australia) 1 | (South Africa) 2 | (United States) 3 | (Portugal) 4 | (Brazil) 5 | (Hawaii) 6 | (Australia) 7 | Points |
|---|---|---|---|---|---|---|---|---|---|---|
| 1 | Steady | Kauli Vaast (FRA) | 2nd | ~~33rd~~ | 33rd | 1st | ~~49th~~ | 9th | 2nd | 29,620 |
| 2 | Steady | Eli Hanneman (HAW) | ~~25th~~ | 5th | ~~17th~~ | 3rd | 2nd | 4th | 9th | 27,635 |
| 3 | Steady | Morgan Cibilic (AUS) | 9th | ~~49th~~ | 9th | 5th | ~~33rd~~ | 2nd | 9th | 22,505 |
| 4 | Steady | George Pittar (AUS) | 17th | 2nd | ~~33rd~~ | 2nd | 25th | 13th | ~~33rd~~ | 22,320 |
| 5 | Steady | Samuel Pupo (BRA) | 9th | 17th | 9th | 9th | 1st | ~~33rd~~ | ~~33rd~~ | 21,860 |
| 6 | Steady | Callum Robson (AUS) | ~~49th~~ | 25th | ~~33rd~~ | 9th | 17th | 1st | 5th | 21,665 |
| 7 | Steady | Luke Thompson (RSA) | ~~33rd~~ | 1st | 13th | 5th | 17th | ~~25th~~ | 17th | 21,665 |
| 8 | Steady | Oscar Berry (AUS) | 17th | 3rd | 9th | 9th | 3rd | ~~33rd~~ | ~~25th~~ | 20,710 |
| 9 | Steady | Mateus Herdy (BRA) | 9th | 9th | 2nd | 9th | ~~25th~~ | ~~33rd~~ | 17th | 19,660 |
| 10 | Steady | Liam O'Brien (AUS) | 9th | 5th | ~~25th~~ | 9th | 9th | 5th | ~~49th~~ | 19,450 |
CT Qualification Line
| 11 | Steady | Levi Slawson (USA) | 25th | ~~49th~~ | 1st | 33rd | 25th | ~~49th~~ | 5th | 18,845 |
| 12 | Steady | Jacob Willcox (AUS) | 1st | 9th | 25th | ~~49th~~ | 33rd | 13th | ~~49th~~ | 18,840 |
| 13 | Steady | Dimitri Poulos (USA) | 5th | ~~25th~~ | 5th | 17th | 25th | ~~33rd~~ | 9th | 16,410 |
| 14 | Steady | Jorgann Couzinet (FRA) | 25th | 3rd | ~~49th~~ | 25th | ~~33rd~~ | 5th | 17th | 16,130 |
| 15 | Steady | Winter Vincent (AUS) | 5th | 17th | ~~25th~~ | 17th | 5th | 25th | ~~49th~~ | 14,990 |
| 16 | Steady | Jordan Lawler (AUS) | 9th | 17th | ~~33rd~~ | 17th | 3rd | 33rd | ~~49th~~ | 13,905 |
| 17 | Steady | Xavier Huxtable (AUS) | 5th | ~~33rd~~ | 13th | 33rd | ~~49th~~ | 7th | ~~33rd~~ | 13,810 |
| 18 | Steady | Shion Crawford (HAW) | ~~49th~~ | 5th | 17th | 25th | ~~49th~~ | 25th | 9th | 13,365 |
| 19 | Steady | Kade Matson (USA) | ~~49th~~ | 9th | 5th | 9th | ~~49th~~ | 33rd | 33rd | 12,785 |
| 20 | Steady | Taro Watanabe (USA) | ~~49th~~ | 9th | 5th | ~~49th~~ | 17th | 25th | 49th | 12,265 |
| 21 | Steady | Hiroto Ohhara (JPN) | 17th | 25th | 3rd | 25th | ~~49th~~ | ~~49th~~ | 33rd | 12,085 |
| 22 | Steady | Michael Rodrigues (BRA) | 9th | 33rd | 3rd | 33rd | ~~49th~~ | ~~49th~~ | 33rd | 11,505 |
| 23 | Steady | Matthew McGillivray (RSA) | 3rd | 9th | 33rd | 49th | 33rd | - | - | 11,405 |

Legend

- Note: The top 10 men qualified for the 2026 Championship Tour.

Men's CT 2026

=== 2025 Women's Challengers Series ===
| Round | Event | Women's champion | Women's runner-up |
|---|---|---|---|
| 1 | (Australia) Burton Automotive Newcastle SURFEST | (Portugal) Francisca Veselko | (Australia) Sally Fitzgibbons |
| 2 | (South Africa) Ballito Pro | (Basque Country (autonomous community)) Nadia Erostarbe | (Portugal) Yolanda Hopkins |
| 3 | (United States) Lexus US Open of Surfing | (United States) Sawyer Lindblad | (France) Tya Zebrowski |
| 4 | (Portugal) EDP Ericeira Pro | (France) Tya Zebrowski | (Australia) India Robinson |
| 5 | (Brazil) Banco do Brasil Saquarema Pro | (Portugal) Yolanda Hopkins | (Basque Country (autonomous community)) Annette Gonzalez Etxabarri |
| 6 | (Hawaii) Lexus Pipe Challenger | (Hawaii) Gabriela Bryan | (Canada) Erin Brooks |
| 7 | (Australia) Bioglan Newcastle SURFEST | (United States) Alyssa Spencer | (Australia) Ziggy Aloha Mackenzie |

| Position | 1st | 2nd | 3rd | 5th | 9th | 17th | 25th | 33rd | 41st |
|---|---|---|---|---|---|---|---|---|---|
| Points | 10,000 | 7,800 | 6,085 | 4,745 | 3,320 | 1,900 | 1,700 | 700 | 650 |

| Ranking | +/- | Surfer | Events | | | | | | | Points |
| Ranking | +/- | Surfer | (Australia) 1 | (South Africa) 2 | (United States) 3 | (Portugal) 4 | (Brazil) 5 | (Hawaii) 6 | (Australia) 7 | Points |
|---|---|---|---|---|---|---|---|---|---|---|
| 1 | Steady | Tya Zebrowski (FRA) | 3rd | ~~5th~~ | 2nd | 1st | ~~5th~~ | 5th | 3rd | 34,715 |
| 2 | Steady | Yolanda Hopkins (POR) | 5th | 2nd | 5th | 3rd | 1st | ~~17th~~ | ~~17th~~ | 33,375 |
| 3 | Steady | Sally Fitzgibbons (AUS) | 2nd | 3rd | ~~13th~~ | 9th | 3rd | ~~25th~~ | 9th | 26,610 |
| 4 | Steady | Alyssa Spencer (USA) | ~~25th~~ | 9th | ~~13th~~ | 5th | 9th | 5th | 1st | 26,130 |
| 5 | Steady | Francisca Veselko (POR) | 1st | 5th | ~~41th~~ | 9th | ~~17th~~ | 7th | 17th | 24,510 |
| 6 | Steady | Nadia Erostarbe (Basque Country) | 17th | 1st | 5th | ~~25th~~ | ~~25th~~ | 9th | 17th | 21,865 |
| 7 | Steady | Anat Lelior (ISR) | ~~41th~~ | 9th | ~~33rd~~ | 3rd | 17th | 4th | 9th | 20,310 |
CT Qualification Line
| 8 | Steady | Annette Gonzalez Etxabarri (Basque Country) | ~~33rd~~ | ~~33rd~~ | 3rd | 17th | 2nd | 17th | 17th | 19,585 |
| 9 | Steady | Sophie McCulloch (AUS) | 5th | - | 5th | 17th | ~~25th~~ | 9th | 5th | 19,455 |
| 10 | Steady | Kirra Pinkerton (USA) | 5th | ~~25th~~ | 9th | 5th | 25th | ~~41th~~ | 9th | 17,830 |
| 11 | Steady | Ellie Harrison (AUS) | 9th | ~~25th~~ | 13th | 17th | 5th | ~~41th~~ | 5th | 17,830 |
| 12 | Steady | Teresa Bonvalot (POR) | 3rd | 9th | 13th | ~~25th~~ | ~~17th~~ | 17th | 9th | 17,745 |
| 13 | Steady | Laura Raupp (BRA) | 9th | 3rd | ~~17th~~ | 9th | ~~25th~~ | 13th | 17th | 17,745 |
| 14 | Steady | India Robinson (AUS) | 17th | ~~25th~~ | ~~25th~~ | 2nd | 9th | 17th | 25th | 16,620 |
| 15 | Steady | Amuro Tsuzuki (JPN) | 5th | ~~17th~~ | ~~25th~~ | 5th | 9th | 17th | 17th | 16,610 |
| 16 | Steady | Sol Aguirre (PER) | 9th | 9th | ~~41th~~ | 25th | 17th | ~~33rd~~ | 3rd | 16,325 |
| 17 | Steady | Sanoa Dempfle-Olin (CAN) | - | - | 33rd | 5th | 9th | 25th | 5th | 15,210 |

Legend Note: The top 7 qualified for the 2026 Championship Tour.

Women's CT 2026

== See also ==
- 2025 ISA World Surfing Games
