= 2025 World Surf League Finals =

Surfing event

- Venue: Cloudbreak
- Location: Tavarua, Fiji
- Dates: September 2, 2025
- Competitors: 10 from 5 nations

Champions
- Men: (Brazil) Yago Dora (1)
- Women: (Australia) Molly Picklum (1)

The 2025 Lexus WSL Finals Fiji was the 12th and final event of the 2025 World Surf League. It was the fifth edition of the World Surf League Finals, and took place at Cloudbreak in Fiji on September 2, 2025.

== Format ==
The event features the top five surfers from both the men's and women's regular season standings, and consists of four head-to-head matches, held on a single day. In the first match, the surfers ranked fourth and fifth go head-to-head, with the winner advancing to take on the third-ranked surfer in the second match. The winner of the second match then takes on the second-ranked surfer in the third match, with the winner qualifying for the title match against the top-ranked surfer in the standings.

=== Format Updates ===
If the No. 1 seed wins the first heat of the best-of-three World Title match, they will clinch the World Title without needing to surf a second or third heat.

== Results ==
=== Men ===
==== Draw ====
Match 1
4	(Australia) Jack Robinson	5.83
5	(Brazil) Ítalo Ferreira	14.33

Match 2
3	(United States) Griffin Colapinto	16.33
5	(Brazil) Ítalo Ferreira	13.67

Match 3
2	(South Africa) Jordy Smith	13.50
3	(United States) Griffin Colapinto	15.43

Title match
1	(Brazil) Yago Dora	1
3	(United States) Griffin Colapinto	0

==== Title match ====
(Brazil) Yago Dora	Round	(United States) Griffin Colapinto
15.66	1	12.33
-	2	-
-	3	-

=== Women ===
==== Draw ====
Match 1
4	(United States) Caroline Marks	9.66
5	(Hawaii) Bettylou Sakura Johnson	5.00

Match 2
3	(United States) Caitlin Simmers	11.33
4	(United States) Caroline Marks	14.60

Match 3
2	(Hawaii) Gabriela Bryan	9.47
4	(United States) Caroline Marks	13.67

Title match
1	(Australia) Molly Picklum	2
4	(United States) Caroline Marks	1

==== Title match ====
(Australia) Molly Picklum	Round	(United States) Caroline Marks
10.50	1	12.50
15.83	2	8.03
16.93	3	6.24
