= Molly Picklum =

Australian professional surfer

Personal information
- Born: 26 November 2002 (age 23) Gosford, New South Wales, Australia
- Height: 5 ft 5 in (165 cm)
- Weight: 136 lb (62 kg)

Surfing career
- Sport: Surfing
- Best year: 1st: 2025 – WSL World Champion
- Sponsors: Red Bull Surfing, Rip Curl, Visa
- Major achievements: 2025 World Surf League Champion; WSL Championship Tour event wins: 6

Surfing specifications
- Stance: Regular
Medal record
Women's surfing
Representing Australia
World Games
Bronze medal – third place	2024 Arecibo	Team

Molly Picklum (born 26 November 2002) is an Australian professional surfer. She competes in the elite (top 16) of the World Surf League. In September 2025, she became the World Champion in the 2025 WSL Women's Championship Tour.

== Early years ==
Picklum was born in Gosford, New South Wales, and grew up on the Central Coast region of New South Wales, with her parents splitting when she was an infant. Her first club was the North Entrance Surf Club, where she competed and trained in surf lifesaving. Picklum has credited the "good community" of her local club with inspiring her to pursue her competitive surfing career. While neither parent surfed, Picklum's mother began dating a surfing instructor, and the sport proving challenging enough to keep her interested. She was involved in multiple sports, including soccer and Oztag, while also representing New South Wales Under 12s in touch football.

At the age of 13, Picklum joined Glenn 'Micro' Hall's squad, the same squad that trained the then-women's World Surf League champion, Tyler Wright. A year later, she began being sponsored by Rip Curl after winning the Australian Women's Junior title and was signed to Surfing Australia's High Performance team. Picklum would not relocate to the Gold Coast, where most of Australia's surfing support base was located, instead choosing to remain on the Central Coast, to stay close to her family and community.

== Professional surfing career ==
=== 2019–2022: Junior circuit and WSL debut ===
In 2021, Picklum was awarded a Sports Australia Hall of Fame scholarship due to her success on the domestic junior circuit, and emerging results on the World Surf League Qualifying Series.

=== 2023–2024: Emergence on the world tour ===
In her second year in WCT tour (2023) she won the event in Sunset Beach (Hawaii) and in 2024 successfully defended her title. She represented Australia in the 2024 Summer Olympics.

Also in 2024, she became the first woman to score a perfect 10 while surfing the Banzai Pipeline.

=== 2025: First world title ===
Picklum's pre-season was full of changes, including an amicable split with her longtime coach, Hall, after the conclusion of the 2024 season. She made the decision not to hire a new full-time coach, instead employing local coaches at each stop of the tour. She also began seeing a mind coach in the off-season to help her with the need to "accept things," citing that her hunger and determination to win was making it difficult to "admit" when decisions did not go in her favour. In addition, she was undergoing rehabilitation for a broken foot.

Picklum credited the competition at Lowers Trestles as being the turning point in her season, with Picklum later recalling running past a camera yelling "let's go," along with her semi-final victory over defending world champion Simmers, as the key moments she realised that she could win the world title. The next competition after her final at Trestles, Picklum continued to sustain the momentum, winning at the Rio Pro in Brazil, which moved her up to world number one. She would go onto reach the final at Jeffreys Bay, South Africa, finishing runner-up to Gabriela Bryan by 0.26-points, with Picklum splashing the water in frustration after missing potential waves under priority that could have given her an opportunity to win the event.

The next event would take place in Teahupo'o, Tahiti. Picklum's quarter-final against Vahiné Fierro saw Picklum, behind for the final moments of the heat, catching a wave with seconds to go with her wave being enough for her to advance to the semi-finals, calling it a "one last do-or-die moment," and would go on to her second event win of the year. When reflecting on her quarter-final victory in particular Picklum described the situation and journey to victory as, “the moments that create you, and define you as a competitor.” Picklum would enter the WSL finals ranked as the number one seed, having accumulated the most points on tour throughout the year, with her consistency proving pivotal to her season, advancing to the quarterfinals in every event apart from one.

Picklum would face 2023 world champion and number four seed, Caroline Marks, in a best of 3 series of heats at Cloudbreak, Fiji. Marks would win the first heat with a 2-point win, while the swell at Cloudbreak began to increase in size, it turned the conditions to Picklum's favour. Picklum would win heat two, which included a 8.33-point wave, with an overall total of 15.83, finishing with a 7.80-point win over Marks and forcing the world title battle into a deciding heat. In the third and final heat, Picklum began with a 7.00-point wave, with her next wave scoring an 8.83 which included a barrel, earning her overall total heat score of 16.93 and winning over Marks by 10.69 points, thus becoming the world champion. Picklum would be the last women's world champion crowned in the WSL finals format, with the WSL reverting to the cumulative total points system last used in 2019, something that Picklum was looking forward to, admitting her challenges with the WSL finals but was still "really proud that I won in the (WSL finals) format." Picklum's world title was also the first for an Australian surfer since Stephanie Gilmore's world title in 2022.

After winning the world title, Picklum returned to a guard of honour at Sydney Airport when returning from Fiji, and a victory party in her home-town in the Central Coast, calling the experience "surreal" and was "still fathoming it all.” Picklum was also nominated for a Laureus Award for Action Sportsperson of the Year, for her performance during the 2025 season.

=== 2026: World-title defence ===
Prior to the contest starting, with increased media duties and more public exposure after winning her world title, Picklum was feeling "a little bit tired," although also stated that "my boards are feeling really good." Picklum began her first world title defence with a second-place finish at Bells Beach to Gabriela Bryan. Defeating Lakey Peterson in the quarterfinal by 5.70 points, Picklum's semi-final would feature an all-Australian showdown with Isabella Nichols, with Picklum advancing to the final.

== Surfing results ==
=== Victories ===
WSL Finals Wins
Year	Event	Venue	Country
2025	Lexus WSL Finals Fiji	Cloudbreak, Tavarua	Fiji

WCT Wins
Year	Event	Venue	Country
2026	MEO Rip Curl Pro Portugal	Supertubos, Peniche	Portugal
2025	Lexus Tahiti Pro	Teahupo'o, Tahiti	French Polynesia
2025	VIVO Rio Pro	Saquarema, Rio de Janeiro	Brazil
2024	Hurley Pro Sunset Beach	Sunset Beach, Oahu	Hawaii
2023	Hurley Pro Sunset Beach	Sunset Beach, Oahu	Hawaii

WSL Challenger Series Wins
Year	Event	Venue	Country
2022	Ballito Pro	Ballito, KwaZulu-Natal	South Africa

WQS Wins
Year	Event	Venue	Country
2021	Oakberry Tweed Coast Pro	Kingscliff, New South Wales	Australia
2021	Sisstrevolution Central Coast Pro	Avoca Beach, New South Wales	Australia
2021	Great Lakes Pro	Boomerang Beach, New South Wales	Australia

Juniors Wins
Year	Event	Venue	Country
2022	Central Coast Pro Junior	Avoca Beach, New South Wales	Australia
2019	Skullcandy Pro Junior	Lennox Head, New South Wales	Australia
2019	Hydralyte Sports Shoalhaven Pro Junior	Shoalhaven, New South Wales	Australia
2019	Gold Coast Pro Junior	Burleigh Heads, Queensland	Australia
2019	Lake Mac City Pro Junior	Redhead Beach, New South Wales	Australia
2019	Hydralyte Sports QLD Pro Junior	Redland City, Queensland	Australia
