= Yago Dora =

Brazilian surfer

Personal information
- Born: May 18, 1996 (age 30) Curitiba, Paraná, Brazil
- Height: 5 ft 11 in (1.80 m)
- Weight: 169 lb (77 kg)

Surfing career
- Sport: Surfing
- Best year: 1st: 2025 – WSL World Champion
- Career earnings: Volcom, Mãe Terra, Natural One, Lost Surfboards
- Major achievements: 2025 World Surf League Champion; WSL Championship Tour event wins: 5; 1x US Open of Surfing champion (2019)

Surfing specifications
- Stance: Goofy

Yago Dora (born May 18, 1996) is a Brazilian professional surfer who is in the World Surf League. In September 2025, he became the World Champion in the 2025 WSL Men's Championship Tour.

== Early life ==
Yago Dora was born in Curitiba, but developed his passion for surfing when his family moved to Florianópolis, encouraged by his father, Leandro Dora, a great coach of the world's surfing elite. Dora started later than others in the world of surfing, but at 11 everything changed and he was soon doing radical maneuvers.

== Career ==
In 2017, he made his first appearance at a WSL Men's Championship Tour event at the Saquarema stage of the Oi Rio Pro as a wildcard, where he performed surprisingly well, finishing 3rd and defeating big names in world surfing such as Gabriel Medina, Mick Fanning and John John Florence. That same year, he placed 6th in the Qualifying Series and qualified for the 2018 CT for the first time in his career.

In the following years, Yago quickly gained prominence on the world circuit, but his rise was interrupted after tearing the ligament in his left ankle, which left him out of the first 5 events on the world circuit in 2022.

In the following 2 years, Yago demonstrated a significant improvement on his surfing and figured among the top 10 surfers in the league. In 2023, Yago reached his first final and won the VIVO Rio Pro, beating Ethan Ewing in the final. He finished 7th in the final Ranking. In 2024 Yago had a complicated start to the season and almost fell into the mid-season cut, but he recovered in the final part of the season making 2 finals in a row, in El Salvador and again at the VIVO Rio Pro, he came close to qualifying for the 2024 WSL Finals, but lost the spot in the last stage to his compatriot Ítalo Ferreira finishing the season in 6th place.

After the 2024 season, Dora ended his coaching partnership with his father and began working with Brazilian coach Leandro da Silva. In 2025 he won the MEO Rip Curl Pro Portugal and the Lexus Trestles Pro on his way to the world title. In 2025, Yago reached the WSL Finals in the first position in the rank. After defeating Griffin Colapinto, Yago won the WSL Championship Tour - widely considered the most important title in the sport. Leandro Dora, who stepped away from coaching Australian surfer Jack Robinson just before the WSL Finals, described watching his son win the title at Cloudbreak as "a dream come true."

== Career Victories ==
WSL Finals Wins
Year	Event	Venue	Country
2025	Lexus WSL Finals Fiji	Cloudbreak, Tavarua	Fiji

WCT Wins
Year	Event	Venue	Country
2026	VIVO Rio Pro	Saquarema, Rio de Janeiro	Brazil
2025	Lexus Trestles Pro	Trestles, California	United States
2025	MEO Rip Curl Pro Portugal	Supertubos, Peniche	Portugal
2023	VIVO Rio Pro	Saquarema, Rio de Janeiro	Brazil
WQS Wins
Year	Event	Venue	Country
2021	Saquarema Surf Festival Quiksilver Pro QS	Saquarema, Rio de Janeiro	Brazil
2019	Vans US Open of Surfing	Huntington Beach, California	United States
2018	Red Nose São Sebastião Pro Maresias	Maresias, São Paulo	Brazil
2017	Azores Airlines Pro	Santa Barbara, Azores	Portugal
2017	Maitland and Port Stephens Toyota Pro	Newcastle, NSW	Australia
