= Cole Houshmand =

American professional surfer

Personal information
- Born: December 27, 2000 (age 25) San Clemente, California, U.S.
- Height: 6 ft 4 in (193 cm)
- Weight: 220 lb (100 kg)

Surfing career
- Sport: Surfing
- Best year: 2025 – Ranked No. 10 WSL CT World Tour
- Career earnings: Jaxxon, RAW Nutrition, Santo Studio
- Major achievements: WSL Championship Tour event wins: 3; 2023 Challenger Series champion

Surfing specifications
- Stance: Goofy

Cole Houshmand (born December 27, 2000) is an American professional surfer who is in the World Surf League.

== Career ==
Houshmand started competing on the QS in 2014, but only made it to the professional circuit when he won the 2023 Challenger Series. That year, he won two consecutive stages and maintained his results to qualify for the 2024 CT for the first time in his career.

In 2024, as a rookie, he won the Bells Beach stage and added his name to the list of bell ringers. He finished his first year in 15th place.

== Career victories ==
WCT Wins
Year	Event	Venue	Country
2026	Fiji Pro	Cloudbreak, Tavarua	Fiji
2025	VIVO Rio Pro	Saquarema, Rio de Janeiro	Brazil
2024	Rip Curl Pro Bells Beach	Bells Beach, Victoria	Australia

WSL Challenger Series Wins
Year	Event	Venue	Country
2023	Ballito Pro	Ballito, KwaZulu-Natal	South Africa
2023	GWM Sydney Surf Pro	Manly Beach, Sydney	Australia

WQS Wins
Year	Event	Venue	Country
2023	Cabarete Pro	Encuentro Beach, Puerto Plata	Dominican Republic
Juniors Wins
Year	Event	Venue	Country
2017	Live Like Zander Junior Pro	Soup Bowl, Bathsheba	Barbados

== Controversies ==
In early 2025, Houshmand was heavily criticized by multiple surf outlets for posting, and then deleting, a picture with social media personality Andrew Tate, captioned "G's".
