= Sawyer Lindblad =

American surfer

Personal information
- Born: August 13, 2005 (age 20) San Clemente, California, U.S.
- Height: 5 ft 5 in (165 cm)
- Weight: 125 lb (57 kg)

Surfing career
- Sport: Surfing
- Best year: 2024 – Ranked #8 WSL CT World Tour
- Major achievements: WSL Championship Tour event wins: 1; 2024 WSL Rookie of the Year; 2x US Open of Surfing champion (2023, 2025)

Surfing specifications
- Stance: Goofy

Sawyer Lindblad (born August 13, 2005) is an American surfer from San Clemente, California who has competed professionally since 2019.

== Career ==
Sawyer began competing professionally in the 2019 Women's JR. She achieved her best result in the Challenger Series of the 2023 season, when she reached her first final at the Boost Mobile Gold Coast Pro, being defeated in the final by India Robinson and in the fourth stage she winning the traditional US Open of Surfing defeating the experienced Sally Fitzgibbons in the final. She ranked 3rd in the rankings and secured her access to the Championship Tour for the first time in her career. In the 2024 season, in her rookie year, Lindblad had good results, including her first CT final, at the Margaret River Pro, losing to Gabriela Bryan, and passed the mid-season cutoff. In the eighth stage she reached the final again, losing to Caitlin Simmers in VIVO Rio Pro. She finished the season in 8th place and won the 2024 Rookie of the Year award.

== Surfing results ==
=== Victories ===
WCT Wins
Year	Event	Venue	Country
2026	VIVO Rio Pro	Saquarema, Rio de Janeiro	Brazil

WSL Challenger Series Wins
Year	Event	Venue	Country
2025	Lexus US Open of Surfing	Huntington Beach, California	United States
2023	Wallex US Open of Surfing	Huntington Beach, California	United States
WQS Wins
Year	Event	Venue	Country
2023	Jack's Surfboards Pro	Huntington Beach, California	United States
2023	SLO CAL Open at Pismo Beach	Pismo Beach, California	United States
2022	Nissan Super Girl Surf Pro	Oceanside Pier, California	United States
2022	Jack's Surfboards Pro	Huntington Beach, California	United States
2020	SLO CAL Open at Pismo Beach	Pismo Beach, California	United States
Juniors Wins
Year	Event	Venue	Country
2023	SLO CAL Open at Pismo Beach	Pismo Beach, California	United States
