= Isabella Nichols =

Australian professional surfer

Personal information
- Born: 21 August 1997 (age 29) Denmark
- Height: 5 ft 9 in (175 cm)
- Weight: 147 lb (67 kg)

Surfing career
- Sport: Surfing
- Best year: 2021 – Ranked #8 WSL CT World Tour
- Major achievements: WSL Championship Tour event wins: 2; 2019 World Qualifying Series Champion; 2015 World Junior championship

Surfing specifications
- Stance: Regular

Isabella Nichols (born 21 August 1997) is an Australian professional surfer who competes at the World Surf League.

== Early life ==
Nichols is born in Denmark, but raised in Australia, from Coolum Beach, Queensland. She has been surfing since she was nine years old. She won the world junior championship in January 2016 held in Portugal. Her 4 years in Pro Junior Tour cost AUD40,000 per year.

== Career ==
Nichols was the stunt double for Blake Lively in the 2016 thriller film The Shallows.

She won the final of the 2022 women's Margaret River Pro on the WSL tour, held in 6-foot (1.8 m) surf at Margaret River Main Break defeating Gabriela Bryan of Kauai, Hawaii. Her score in the final was 12.94 out of a possible 20.00, to her opponent's 10.00. The win lifted Nichols to tenth place on the World Surf League (WSL) tour rankings.

As of 2020, she is studying for a Bachelor of mechanical engineering (Honours) degree at Deakin University.

== Career Victories ==
WCT Wins
Year	Event	Venue	Country
2025	Rip Curl Pro Bells Beach	Bells Beach, Victoria	Australia
2022	Margaret River Pro	Margaret River, Western Australia	Australia

WSL Challenger Series Wins
Year	Event	Venue	Country
2024	GWM Sydney Surf Pro presented by Bonsoy	Sydney, New South Wales	Australia
2023	GWM Sydney Surf Pro	Sydney, New South Wales	Australia

WQS Wins
Year	Event	Venue	Country
2019	Port Stephens Toyota Pro	Port Stephens, New South Wales	Australia
2018	Mothernest Tweed Coast Pro	Tweed Coast, New South Wales	Australia
2017	Flight Centre Burleigh Pro	Burleigh Heads, Queensland	Australia

Juniors Wins
Year	Event	Venue	Country
2015	Los Cabos Open of Surf	Zippers, San Jose del Cabo	Mexico
2015	Vahine Pro Junior	Paparā, Tahiti	French Polynesia
2015	Hurley Australian Open	Manly Beach, New South Wales	Australia
2015	World Junior Championship	Portugal	
