= Tya Zebrowski =

French surfer

Personal information
- Born: March 9, 2011 (age 15) Bayonne, Pyrénées-Atlantiques, France
- Height: 145 cm (4 ft 9 in)
- Weight: 38 kg (84 lb)

Surfing career
- Sport: Surfing
- Major achievements: WSL 2025 Challengers Series Champion

Tya Zebrowski (born 9 March 2011, in Bayonne, Pyrénées-Atlantiques) is a French professional surfer.

== Biography ==
Born on March 9, 2011, in Bayonne, Pyrénées-Atlantiques, daughter of Olympic snowboarder Gary Zebrowski, she grew up between Teahupoʻo, French Polynesia and Hossegor, Landes.

== Career ==
She made her professional debut at eleven in the 2022 and 2023 Junior WSL Series and took part in the 2024 Challenger WSL Series, where she was runner up in the Ericeira event in Portugal. She won it the next year, and was runner up in the US Open leading her ultimately to win 2025 Challenger WSL Series at fourteen. She is the youngest ever to win it.

She qualified and took part in the 2026 WSL Championship, becoming the youngest ever participant in the competition. She reached her first championship final in Vivo Rio Pro, but was defeated by American Sawyer Lindblad.

== Career victories ==
WSL Challenger Series Wins
Year	Event	Venue	Country
2025	EDP Ericeira Pro	Ribeira D'Ilhas, Ericeira	Portugal
