= Rio Pro =

Sports competition

- Current season, competition or edition: Oi Rio Pro 2019
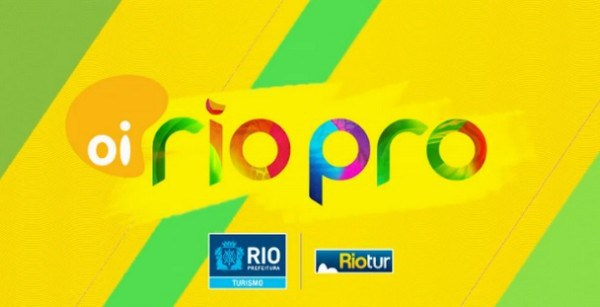
- Sport: Surfing
- Country: Brazil
- Most recent champions: (Brazil) Yago Dora (men) (United States) Sawyer Lindblad (woman)
- Most titles: (Brazil) Filipe Toledo 4 titles (men) (Australia) Sally Fitzgibbons, (Australia) Tyler Wright 3 titles (Woman)

Rio Pro is an event on the WSL World Surfing Tour. The event is held every year at Rio de Janeiro, (RJ, Brazil) in May.

== Results ==
=== Men's ===
Men
| Year | Winner | Nation | Score | Runner-Up | Nation | Score |
| 2026 | Yago Dora (2) | BRA | 15.00 | Leonardo Fioravanti | ITA | 13.17 |
| 2025 | Cole Houshmand | USA | 16.90 | Griffin Colapinto | USA | 14.40 |
| 2024 | Ítalo Ferreira | BRA | 13.67 | Yago Dora | BRA | 10.60 |
| 2023 | Yago Dora | BRA | 14.83 | Ethan Ewing | AUS | 10.83 |
| 2022 | Filipe Toledo (4) | BRA | 18.67 | Samuel Pupo | BRA | 10.73 |
| 2019 | Filipe Toledo (3) | BRA | 18.04 | Jordy Smith | ZAF | 8.43 |
| 2018 | Filipe Toledo (2) | BRA | 17.10 | Wade Carmichael | AUS | 8.00 |
| 2017 | Adriano de Souza (2) | BRA | 17.63 | Adrian Buchan | AUS | 17.23 |
| 2016 | John John Florence (2) | HAW | 18.97 | Jack Freestone | AUS | 16.13 |
| 2015 | Filipe Toledo | BRA | 19.87 | Bede Durbidge | AUS | 14.70 |
| 2014 | Michel Bourez | PYF | 13.84 | Kolohe Andino | USA | 10.83 |
| 2013 | Jordy Smith | ZAF | 17.80 | Adriano De Souza | BRA | 16.34 |
| 2012 | John John Florence | HAW | 16.37 | Joel Parkinson | AUS | 11.44 |
| 2011 | Adriano De Souza | BRA | 15.63 | Taj Burrow | AUS | 12.17 |
| 2002 | Taj Burrow (2) | AUS | 14.25 | Mick Fanning | Australia | 13.50 |
| 2001 | Trent Munro | AUS | 23.25 | Mark Occhilupo | Australia | 13.75 |
| 2000 | Kalani Robb | United States | 19.40 | Taj Burrow | AUS | 17.90 |
| 1999 | Taj Burrow | Australia | 24.10 | | | |
| 1998 | Peterson Rosa | Brazil | 28.85 | Mick Campbell | Australia | 27.40 |
| 1997 | Kelly Slater | United States | 25.50 | Mark Occhilupo | Australia | 20.15 |
| 1996 | Taylor Knox | United States | 31.05 | Ross Williams | Hawaii | 30.10 |
| 1995 | Barton Lynch | Australia | 29.00 | Sunny Garcia | Hawaii | 15.83 |
| 1994 | Shane Powell | Australia | 29.61 | Rob Machado | United States | 15.84 |
| 1993 | Dave Macaulay (3) | Australia | 28.20 | Fabio Gouveia | Brazil | 21.20 |
| 1992 | Damien Hardman | Australia | 27.90 | Tom Carroll | Australia | 24.90 |
| 1991 | Flavio Padaratz | Brazil | | Sunny Garcia | Hawaii | |
| 1990 | Bradley Gerlach | United States | | Flavio Padaratz | Brazil | |
| 1989 | Dave Macaulay (2) | Australia | 119.00 | Martin Potter | United Kingdom | 116.60 |
| 1988 | Dave Macaulay | Australia | | | | |
| 1982 | Terry Richardson | Australia | | Roberto Valério | Brazil | |
| 1981 | Cheyne Horan (2) | Australia | | Valdir Vagas | Brazil | |
| 1980 | Joey Buran | United States | | Ismael Miranda | Brazil | |
| 1978 | Cheyne Horan | Australia | | Peter Townend | Australia | |
| 1977 | Daniel Friedmann | Brazil | | Pepe Lopes | Brazil | |
| 1976 | Pepe Lopes | Brazil | | Jeff Crawford | United States | |

=== Women's ===
| Year | Winner | Nation | Score | Runner-up | Nation | Score |
|---|---|---|---|---|---|---|
| 2026 | Sawyer Lindblad | USA | 7.67 | Tya Zebrowski | FRA | 6.10 |
| 2025 | Molly Picklum | AUS | 15.00 | Luana Silva | BRA | 9.23 |
| 2024 | Caitlin Simmers (2) | USA | 15.50 | Sawyer Lindblad | USA | 3.26 |
| 2023 | Caitlin Simmers | USA | 14.66 | Tyler Wright | AUS | 9.80 |
| 2022 | Carissa Moore (2) | HAW | 15.43 | Johanne Defay | FRA | 12.33 |
| 2019 | Sally Fitzgibbons (3) | AUS | 14.64 | Carissa Moore | HAW | 12.57 |
| 2018 | Stephanie Gilmore | AUS | 11.53 | Lakey Peterson | USA | 8.00 |
| 2017 | Tyler Wright (3) | AUS | 17.17 | Johanne Defay | FRA | 13.20 |
| 2016 | Tyler Wright (2) | AUS | 13.10 | Sally Fitzgibbons | AUS | 10.34 |
| 2015 | Courtney Conlogue | USA | 14.50 | Bianca Buitendag | ZAF | 11.10 |
| 2014 | Sally Fitzgibbons (2) | AUS | 16.27 | Carissa Moore | HAW | 14.67 |
| 2013 | Tyler Wright | AUS | 17.80 | Sally Fitzgibbons | AUS | 15.67 |
| 2012 | Sally Fitzgibbons | AUS | 14.10 | Coco Ho | HAW | 14.03 |
| 2011 | Carissa Moore | HAW | 14.87 | Sally Fitzgibbons | AUS | 13.80 |

== See also ==
- Surfing in Brazil
