= Surfing in Brazil =

- Country: Brazil
- National team(s): Brazil Olympics team

International competitions
- Summer Olympics

Surfing was first introduced in Brazil in the 1970s.

The sport is predominantly participated by the middle class of the country.

Rio Pro is one of the major professional surfing events in Brazil.

Brazil has emerged as a major power in sport surfing, which has been labeled the Brazilian Storm. Gabriel Medina was the first Brazilian to win a World Surfing Championship.

Rodrigo Koxa broke the world record for the largest wave at 80 ft (24.3 meters).
