= Kelia Gallina =

Tahitian surfer

Kelia Mehani Gallina
Personal information
- Born: 10 August 2012 (age 14) Teahupoʻo, Tahiti, French Polynesia
- Height: 4 ft 9 in (1.45 m)

Surfing career
- Sport: Surfing

Surfing specifications
- Stance: Goofy

Kelia Gallina is a Tahitian surfer. She was born in Teahupoʻo to a Hawaiian father and a Tahitian mother.

She made her debut in the World Surf League in 2025 when she was just 12 being the youngest surfer ever to compete in the elite.

In 2026 she won the trials to compete for the second time in the Billabong Pro Teahupoo, eliminating two former word champions: Tyler Wright and Caroline Marks.
