= Marco Mignot =

French surfer (born 2000)

Personal information
- Born: 23 December 2000 (age 25) New Caledonia
- Years active: 2012 - present
- Height: 180 cm (5 ft 11 in)
- Weight: 73 kg (161 lb)

Surfing career
- Sport: Surfing
- Best year: 2025 - Ranked #16 WSL CT World Tour
- Sponsors: Quiksilver, JS Industries surfboards
- Major achievements: 2025 WSL Rookie of the Year

Surfing specifications
- Stance: Regular

Marco Mignot (born 23 December 2000) is a French-Mexican surfer from Sayulita, Mexico.

== Early life ==
Born to a French father from Perpignan and a Spanish mother from Palma de Mallorca, Marco Mignot holds both a French and Canadian passport, the latter being a result of his father having spent 10 years living in Canada during his childhood. Mignot has a brother four years his elder named Nomme.

Mignot was born during a 10-year long journey at sea, during a brief stop in New Caledonia. As a result, he spent many of his formative years sailing around the Australia and Tasmanian Sea. The rest of his childhood was spent in Sayulita, Mexico, where he moved when he was 4 years old. After moving to Sayulita, his cousin Diego Mignot taught Mignot and his brother to bodyboard. Mignot began surfing at the age of seven.

== Career ==
Mignot began competing on the World Surf League (WSL) Men's Junior Tour in 2012. In 2016, Mignot began competing in the Men's Qualifying Series, and in 2021 he joined the Men's Challenger Series.

In 2023, Mignot achieved a major milestone by winning the European Qualifying Series title.

In 2024 he placed 3rd in the Challenger Series, winning the Corona Saquarema Pro and reaching the final of the US Open of Surfing at Huntington Beach losing to Alan Cleland Jr., and qualified for the 2025 CT season for the first time in his career.

Mignot is coached by Jason Aparicio.

In his first year on the championship tour, Mignot placed 16th overall and was named rookie of the year.

== Results ==
=== Victories ===
WSL Challenger Series Wins
Year	Event	Venue	Country
2024	Corona Saquarema Pro	Saquarema, Rio de Janeiro, Brazil	Brazil

WQS Wins
Year	Event	Venue	Country
2023	Pro Santa Cruz presented by Noah Surf House	Praia da Fisica, Santa Cruz	Portugal
2023	Caparica Surf Fest	Caparica, Almada	Portugal
2019	Caraïbos Lacanau Pro	Lacanau Océan, Gironde	France
Juniors Wins
Year	Event	Venue	Country
2018	Junior Pro Sopela	Sopela, Basque Country	Spain
2018	Caparica Junior Pro	Caparica, Almada	Portugal
2017	Junior Pro Espinho	Espinho, Porto	Portugal
2016	Pro A Coruna	Coruña, Galicia	Spain
