= Margaret River Pro =

Sports competition

- Sport: Surfing
- Country: Australia
- Most recent champions: (Australia) George Pittar (men) (United States) Lakey Peterson (women)
- Most titles: (Australia) Jack Robinson, (Hawaii) John John Florence, (Australia) Tom Carroll 2 titles (men) (Hawaii) Carissa Moore 3 titles (women)
- Website: http://www.worldsurfleague.com/events/2015/mct/1226/drug-aware-margaret-river-pro, http://www.worldsurfleague.com/events/2015/wct/1227/womens-drug-aware-margaret-river-pro

Margaret River Pro is an event on the ASP World Surfing Tour currently WSL World Surfing League.

It was established in 1985. It has had a range of sponsors over time, including various agencies of the Western Australian government. The event has been held every year since at Surfers Point, Prevelly, near Margaret River, Western Australia, except in 2018 when the third and subsequent rounds for men and fourth and subsequent rounds for women were held in Uluwatu, Indonesia because of shark attacks.

== Results ==
Men's
| Year | Winner | Nation | Score | Runner-up | Nation | Score |
|---|---|---|---|---|---|---|
| 2026 | George Pittar | Australia | 15.17 | Gabriel Medina | Brazil | 12.46 |
| 2025 | Jordy Smith | South Africa | 12.00 | Griffin Colapinto | United States | 4.83 |
| 2024 | Jack Robinson (2) | Australia | 17.27 | John John Florence | Hawaii | 16.04 |
| 2023 | Gabriel Medina | Brazil | 17.50 | Griffin Colapinto | United States | 12.27 |
| 2022 | Jack Robinson | Australia | 16.24 | John John Florence | Hawaii | 15.60 |
| 2021 | Filipe Toledo | Brazil | 17.4 | Jordy Smith | South Africa | 14.23 |
| 2019 | John John Florence (2) | Hawaii | 18.50 | Kolohe Andino | United States | 15.10 |
| 2017 | John John Florence | Hawaii | 19.03 | Kolohe Andino | United States | 13.60 |
| 2016 | Sebastian Zietz | Hawaii | 17.40 | Julian Wilson | Australia | 16.67 |
| 2015 | Adriano De Souza | Brazil | 17.53 | John John Florence | Hawaii | 16.87 |
| 2014 | Michel Bourez | French Polynesia | 15.90 | Josh Kerr | Australia | 12.44 |
| 1990 | Barton Lynch | Australia | 117.90 | Jeff Booth | United States | 109.3 |
| 1989 | Dave MaCaulay | Australia | 110.80 | Tom Carroll | Australia | 80.00 |
| 1987 | Tom Carroll (2) | Australia | 134.50 | Rob Bain | Australia | 120.80 |
| 1986 | Tom Carroll | Australia | 5.00 | Tom Curren | United States | 0.00 |
| 1985 | Mark Occhilupo | Australia | | Mark Richards | Australia | |

Women's
| Year | Winner | Nation | Score | Runner-up | Nation | Score |
|---|---|---|---|---|---|---|
| 2026 | Lakey Peterson (2) | United States | 12.23 | Luana Silva | Brazil | 11.83 |
| 2025 | Gabriela Bryan (2) | Hawaii | 17.33 | Caitlin Simmers | United States | 12.84 |
| 2024 | Gabriela Bryan | Hawaii | 15.93 | Sawyer Lindblad | United States | 13.94 |
| 2023 | Carissa Moore (3) | Hawaii | 11.10 | Tyler Wright | Australia | 9.17 |
| 2022 | Isabella Nichols | Australia | 12.94 | Gabriela Bryan | Hawaii | 10.00 |
| 2021 | Tatiana Weston-Webb | Brazil | 16.23 | Stephanie Gilmore | Australia | 15.00 |
| 2019 | Lakey Peterson | United States | 13.33 | Tatiana Weston-Webb | Brazil | 10.40 |
| 2017 | Sally Fitzgibbons | Australia | 14.90 | Tyler Wright | Australia | 12.53 |
| 2016 | Tyler Wright | Australia | 18.67 | Courtney Conlogue | United States | 14.70 |
| 2015 | Courtney Conlogue | United States | 16.93 | Carissa Moore | Hawaii | 13.13 |
| 2014 | Carissa Moore (2) | Hawaii | 15.73 | Tyler Wright | Australia | 14.10 |
| 2013 | Carissa Moore | Hawaii | 11.00 | Tyler Wright | Australia | 6.94 |

== See also ==
- Surfing locations in South West Western Australia
