= Gary Zebrowski =

French snowboarder (born 1984)

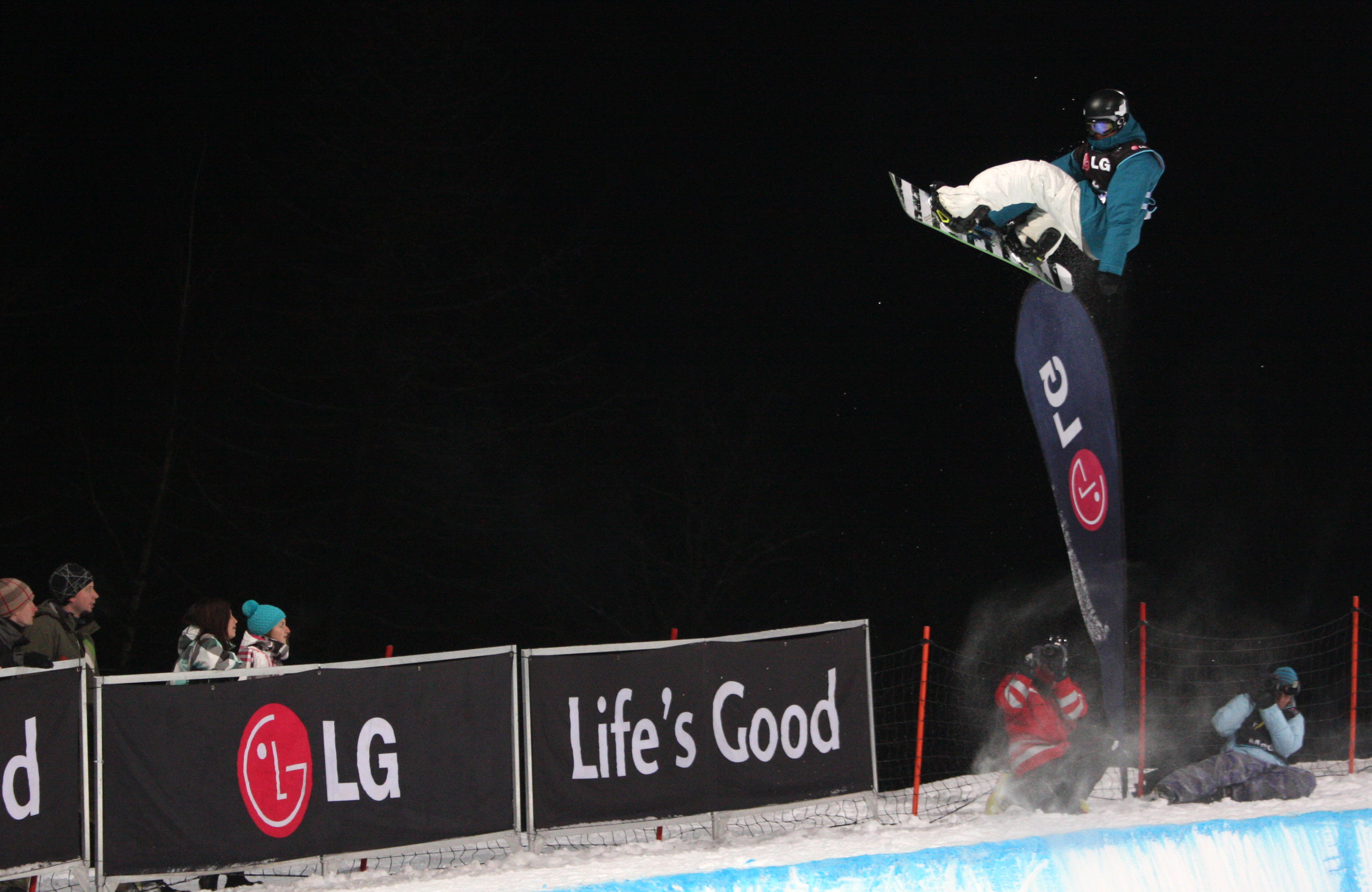
- Gary Zebrowski in 2010.

Personal information
- Born: 21 July 1984 (age 42) Papeete, French Polynesia
- Height: 180 cm (5 ft 11 in)
- Weight: 75 kg (165 lb)
- Children: Tya Zebrowski

Sport
- Country: France
- Sport: Snowboarding
- Event: Halfpipe
- Club: CS Les 2 Alpes

Gary Zebrowski (born 21 July 1984) is a French snowboarder. He competed in the halfpipe at the 2006 Winter Olympics, finishing in 6th place, and 2010 Winter Olympics, finishing in 13th place. He was born in Papeete, French Polynesia.

He is the father of surfer Tya Zebrowski.
