= Barron Mamiya =

American professional surfer (born 2000)

Personal information
- Born: 27 January 2000 (age 26) Haleiwa, Oahu, Hawaii
- Height: 5 ft 9 in (175 cm)
- Weight: 136 lb (62 kg)

Surfing career
- Sport: Surfing
- Best year: 2025 - Ranked #11 WSL CT World Tour
- Sponsors: RVCA
- Major achievements: WSL Championship Tour event wins: 3

Surfing specifications
- Stance: Regular (natural foot)
- Favorite maneuvers: Aerial manoeuvres, big-wave barrels

Barron Mamiya (born January 27, 2000) is an American professional surfer from Hawaii. He represents Hawaii on the World Surf League Championship Tour. Mamiya first competed in the Junior World Surf League in 2012 at age 11 and won the Men's Pro Junior Vans US Open of Surfing in 2018.

== Biography ==
He was born and raised in the North Shore community of Haleiwa, Oahu, an island in Hawaii. He began surfing at the age of three, routinely paddling out with his father after work. Mamiya has referenced his love for the sport and lack of other options in Hawaii as being principal motivating factors in his pursuit of surfing.

Notwithstanding such difficulties, Mamiya flourished as a young surfer. He has continued to pursue a career in professional surfing, attributing his success to his perpetual hunger to push and prove his abilities to both himself and his peers.

== Career ==
Since his entry into the Junior World Surf League in 2012 at age 11, Mamiya has established himself as "one of the most promising young surfers" in the world. His surfing stance is regular, and his specialities include aerial maneuvers and big-wave barrels.

=== Junior Tour ===
Active on the Junior Tour since 2012, Mamiya "flourished" as a surfer in 2017, winning three WSL Junior Hawaii Pros. He was crowned champion in the Sunset Pro Junior, Papara Pro Junior Tahiti and Pipe Pro Junior while claiming the runner-up position in the Hurley Surf Club Pro Junior. He managed an average of 13.72 in per heat and 4.28 per wave over the four competitions.

Mamiya backed these performances with similarly strong results in 2018, placing in the top three of each event he competed in. He placed third in the Sunset Pro Junior, was runner-up in both the HYSDO Pro Junior at Turtle Bay Resort and Pipe Pro Junior and won the Men's Jr. Vans US Open of Surfing. He averaged a score of 12.18 per heat and 3.55 per wave over the four competitions.

=== Men's Qualifying Tour (QT) ===
Mamiya has also been active in the Qualifying Tour competition since 2015. While only competing in three events over the 2015 and 2016 seasons, 2017 saw a significant rise in Mamiya's involvement. In 2017 he began to achieve greater results in competitions such as: Sunset Open (ninth), Papara Pro Open Tahiti (ninth) and the Vans World Cup (fifth). These achievements improved his ranking heading into the 2018 season in which he competed in eight events, with his career best result coming at the Burton Automotive Pro in Australia, where he finished second to Mikey Wright in the final. His most recent qualifying tour event, the Sunset Open in Hawaii, resulted in fourth place in late January 2018. Mamiya was knocked out by fellow Hawaii local, Billy Kemper.

=== Men's Championship Tour ===
In May 2018, Mamiya gained entry into the first event on the Championship Tour with a wild-card allocation into the Men's Corona Bali Protected event. He was granted entry after the withdrawal of American surfer Kelly Slater.

Prior to the event, in an interview with Michael Ciaramella from Stab magazine, Mamiya stated that he felt "no pressure at all" and appreciated the opportunity to express himself free from the usual weight of expectation. His inclusion in this event reflects his growing influence in the surfing world.

He came away in 25th place and managed an average heat score of 7.06 and average wave score of 2.82. His inclusion in the Bali Protected gave him the ranking of equal 44th in the current Men's Championship rankings.

Mamiya's first major highlight in the CT was in 2022 when he won the second stage of the year, the Hurley Pro Sunset Beach, beating Kanoa Igarashi in the final. He finished the season in 16th place.

Mamiya didn't have a standout year in 2023, finishing in 12th place. In 2024, in the first event of the year, he made history. For the first time in his career he won the Lexus Pipe Pro, the most classic stage of the CT, defeating John John Florence in the final in an epic confrontation. After this result he had a modest year and was in 14th place.

In the 2025 season, Mamiya made history once again, defending the champion title against Leonardo Fioravanti at Pipe, joining a select group of multi-champions at Pipeline.

== Career Victories ==
WCT Wins
Year	Event	Venue	Country
2025	Lexus Pipe Pro	Banzai Pipeline, Oahu	Hawaii
2024	Lexus Pipe Pro	Banzai Pipeline, Oahu	Hawaii
2022	Hurley Pro Sunset Beach	Sunset Beach, Oahu	Hawaii
WQS Wins
Year	Event	Venue	Country
2022	2022 Sunset Pro	Sunset Beach, Oahu	Hawaii
Juniors Wins
Year	Event	Venue	Country
2018	Vans US Open of Surfing - Men's Jr.	Huntington Beach, California	United States
2017	Pipe Pro Junior	Banzai Pipeline, Oahu	Hawaii
2017	Papara Pro Junior Tahiti	Paparā, Tahiti	French Polynesia
2017	Sunset Pro Junior	Sunset Beach, Oahu	Hawaii

== Surfing Videography ==
He has featured or starred in a number of surfing videos, displaying his skills on YouTube.

=== "Hurley Youth: Barron Mamiya" ===
Mamiya's first major video came through his sponsorship with Hurley in April 2016. The film both interviewed him about his early exposure to surfing, retelling the story of how he "fought his way into the Pipeline pecking order" and became "a face of the future." The video highlights Mamiya's "effortless skill" in negotiating the eight- to ten-foot barrels of Hawaii.

=== "Barron Mamiya, The New Face of the North Shore" ===
In November 2017, the World Surfing League published Mamiya's second major film on their official YouTube channel titled Barron Mamiya, The New Face of the North Shore. Produced and directed by his manager Shaun Ward and filmed by Michael Ikalani, Peter King, Rory Pringle, the video displays the surfer's highlights from the Men's Junior Tour of 2017.

=== Barron Mamiya Flips Out ===
In January 2018, Barron completed one of the first backflips on a surfboard. This innovative maneuver gained more than 100,000 views on YouTube and his entry into Stab magazine's innovative 'Stab High' surf contest. This was the first surf contest of its kind and was completed in a wave pool in Texas.

=== Barron Mamiya and Varial Foam's "Spaceland" ===
Gabriel Caswell was responsible for Mamiya's most recent surf short film. Released in May 2018 for Surfer magazine and Varial Surf Technology the clips demonstrate his "well rounded, progressive…smooth style" in his home break – the North Shore.
