= George Pittar =

Australian surfer

George Pittar is an Australian surfer. He gained international recognition in 2026 after winning his first event at the Margaret River Pro, claiming a World Surf League title.

== Career ==
In 2025, he competed on the Championship Tour but was eliminated mid-season after failing to make the required cut. He later returned to the second-tier Challenger Series, regaining qualification for the 2026 Championship Tour.

In April 2026, Pittar won the Margaret River Pro competition. In the final, he defeated three-time world champion Gabriel Medina.

== Career Victories ==
WCT Wins
Year	Event	Venue	Country
2026	Margaret River Pro	Margaret River, Western Australia	Australia
Juniors Wins
Year	Event	Venue	Country
2020	Hydralyte Sports Surf Series Qld Pro Junior	Gold Coast, Queensland	Australia

== See also ==
- 2026 World Surf League
