= Paparā =

Commune in French Polynesia, France

- Commune
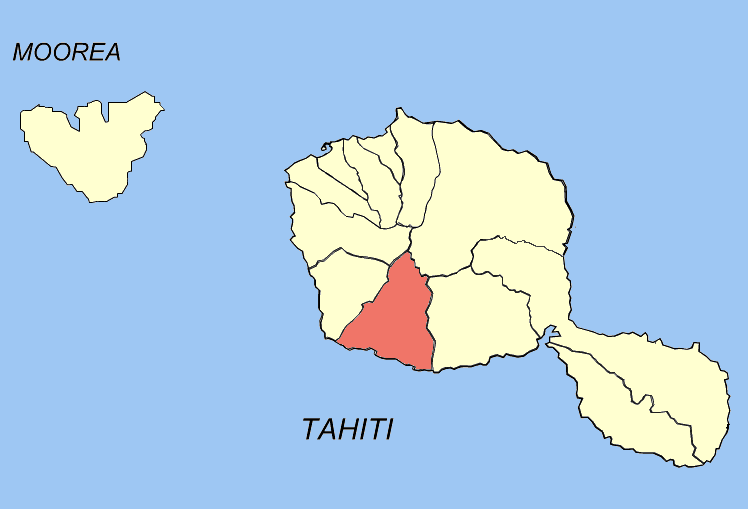
- Location of the commune (in red) within the Windward Islands
- Location of Paparā
- Coordinates: 17°45′30″S 149°30′30″W
- Country: France
- Overseas collectivity: French Polynesia
- Subdivision: Windward Islands

Government
  - Mayor (2020–2026): Sonia Punua
- Area^{1}: 92.5 km^{2} (35.7 sq mi)
- Highest elevation: 1,638 m (5,374 ft)
- Lowest elevation: 0 m (0 ft)
- Population (2022): 11,743
  - Density: 127/km^{2} (329/sq mi)
- Time zone: UTC−10:00
- INSEE/Postal code: 98734 /98712
- ^{1} French Land Register data, which excludes lakes, ponds, glaciers > 1 km^{2} (0.386 sq mi or 247 acres) and river estuaries.

Paparā is a commune of French Polynesia, an overseas territory of France in the Pacific Ocean. Paparā is located on the island of Tahiti, in the administrative subdivision of the Windward Islands, themselves part of the Society Islands. At the 2022 census it had a population of 11,743.

== Geography ==
=== Climate ===
Paparā has a tropical rainforest climate (Köppen climate classification Af). The average annual temperature in Paparā is 25.8 °C (78.4 °F). The average annual rainfall is 2,409.0 mm (94.84 in) with December as the wettest month. The temperatures are highest on average in March, at around 27.1 °C (80.8 °F), and lowest in August, at around 24.2 °C (75.6 °F). The highest temperature ever recorded in Paparā was 35.3 °C (95.5 °F) on 24 March 2021; the coldest temperature ever recorded was 14.4 °C (57.9 °F) on 9 August 2013.

Climate data for Paparā (1991–2020 averages, extremes 1991−present)
Month	Jan	Feb	Mar	Apr	May	Jun	Jul	Aug	Sep	Oct	Nov	Dec	Year
Record high °C (°F)	34.2 (93.6)	35.0 (95.0)	35.3 (95.5)	34.4 (93.9)	33.4 (92.1)	32.5 (90.5)	32.2 (90.0)	33.0 (91.4)	32.7 (90.9)	33.4 (92.1)	33.7 (92.7)	34.1 (93.4)	35.3 (95.5)
Mean daily maximum °C (°F)	31.4 (88.5)	31.6 (88.9)	31.8 (89.2)	31.3 (88.3)	30.2 (86.4)	29.1 (84.4)	28.8 (83.8)	28.7 (83.7)	29.0 (84.2)	29.6 (85.3)	30.6 (87.1)	31.1 (88.0)	30.3 (86.5)
Daily mean °C (°F)	26.9 (80.4)	27.0 (80.6)	27.1 (80.8)	26.7 (80.1)	25.8 (78.4)	24.7 (76.5)	24.4 (75.9)	24.2 (75.6)	24.6 (76.3)	25.2 (77.4)	26.1 (79.0)	26.7 (80.1)	25.8 (78.4)
Mean daily minimum °C (°F)	22.4 (72.3)	22.5 (72.5)	22.4 (72.3)	22.2 (72.0)	21.3 (70.3)	20.3 (68.5)	20.0 (68.0)	19.7 (67.5)	20.2 (68.4)	20.8 (69.4)	21.7 (71.1)	22.3 (72.1)	21.3 (70.3)
Record low °C (°F)	18.3 (64.9)	18.0 (64.4)	19.1 (66.4)	17.5 (63.5)	15.3 (59.5)	15.3 (59.5)	14.6 (58.3)	14.4 (57.9)	14.5 (58.1)	15.7 (60.3)	17.1 (62.8)	17.4 (63.3)	14.4 (57.9)
Average precipitation mm (inches)	224.2 (8.83)	201.5 (7.93)	169.2 (6.66)	197.6 (7.78)	189.6 (7.46)	213.0 (8.39)	133.6 (5.26)	170.6 (6.72)	187.3 (7.37)	206.3 (8.12)	223.0 (8.78)	293.1 (11.54)	2,409 (94.84)
Average precipitation days (≥ 1.0 mm)	16.5	15.2	12.6	12.3	11.7	11.6	10.9	10.7	11.9	12.5	14.1	17.6	157.6
Source: Météo-France
