= Gabriela Bryan =

American professional surfer

Personal information
- Born: 9 April 2002 (age 24) Kilauea, Hawaii, United States

Surfing career
- Sport: Surfing
- Best year: 2025 – Ranked #3 WSL CT World Tour
- Major achievements: WSL Championship Tour event wins: 5; 2022 WSL Rookie of the Year; 2021 Challenger Series champion

Surfing specifications
- Stance: Regular

Gabriela Bryan (born 9 April 2002) is an American professional surfer. She competes in the elite (top 16) of the World Surf League. She was born in Kilauea, Hawaii on 9 April 2002.

== Career ==
In 2022, Bryan qualified to compete on the WSL Championship Tour. She achieved runner-up in one event and two third places, and was named Rookie of the Year.

In 2024, she won her first event in Margaret River, Australia. In 2025, she won Surf City El Salvador Pro.

== Career Victories ==
WCT Wins
Year	Event	Venue	Country
2026	Rip Curl Pro Bells Beach	Bells Beach, Victoria	Australia
2025	Corona Open J-Bay	Jeffreys Bay, Eastern Cap	South Africa
2025	Margaret River Pro	Margaret River, Western Australia	Australia
2025	Surf City El Salvador Pro	Punta Roca, La Libertad	El Salvador
2024	Margaret River Pro	Margaret River, Western Australia	Australia

WSL Challenger Series Wins
Year	Event	Venue	Country
2025	Lexus Pipe Challenger	Oahu	Hawaii

WQS Wins
Year	Event	Venue	Country
2022	2022 Sunset Pro	Sunset Beach, Oahu	Hawaii
2019	Papara Pro Open Tahiti	Paparā, Tahiti	French Polynesia
2018	Papara Pro Vahine Open Tahiti	Paparā, Tahiti	French Polynesia

Juniors Wins
Year	Event	Venue	Country
2019	Heroes de Mayo Iquique Pro Junior	La Punta, Iquique	Chile
2019	Papara Pro Junior Tahiti	Paparā, Tahiti	French Polynesia
2018	Pantin Junior Pro by Gadis	Valdoviño, Galicia	Spain
2018	Sunset Pro Junior	Sunset Beach, Oahu	Hawaii
