= Tavarua =

Island in Fiji

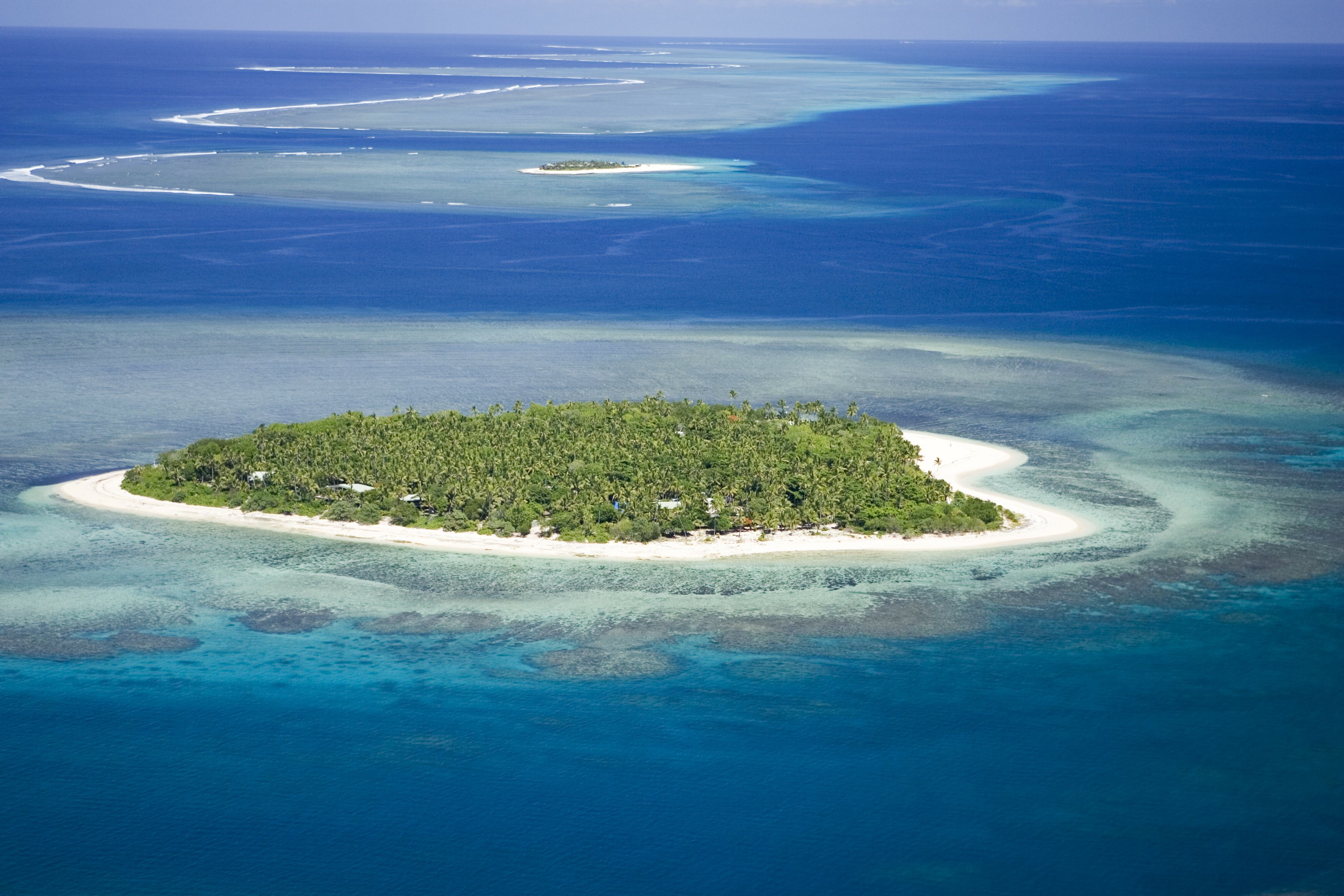
- Tavarua Island Resort, Fiji
- Interactive map of Tavarua

Geography
- Location: South Pacific
- Coordinates: 17.857702°S 177.201791°E
- Archipelago: Mamanuca Islands
- Area: 0.12 km^{2} (0.046 sq mi)

Administration
- Fiji
- Division: Western
- Province: Nadroga-Navosa Province
- District: Malolo

Demographics
- Population: unknown

Additional information
- Official website: Official

Tavarua is an island resort in Fiji. It has an area of 29 acres (120,000 m^{2}). It is close to Namotu and the main Fijian island, Viti Levu, and is surrounded by a coral reef. It is also known to be shaped, somewhat, like a heart.

== Background ==
The resort has surfing, sport fishing, scuba diving, snorkeling and kayaking. There is also a pool, spa, workout facility and tennis court along with a restaurant facility and two bars.

There are seven main surfing breaks on Tavarua: Cloudbreak, Restaurants, Tavarua Rights, Swimming Pools, Namotu Left, Wilkes Pass, and Desperations. Cloudbreak is a powerful left a mile off the island that breaks over coral reef and is ranked by many surfers as the best wave in the world.

Tavarua hosts annual professional surfing competitions. The island was bought by Larry Page in 2020.

== See also ==
- Big wave surfing
