= Saquarema =

- Municipality
- Municipality of Saquarema
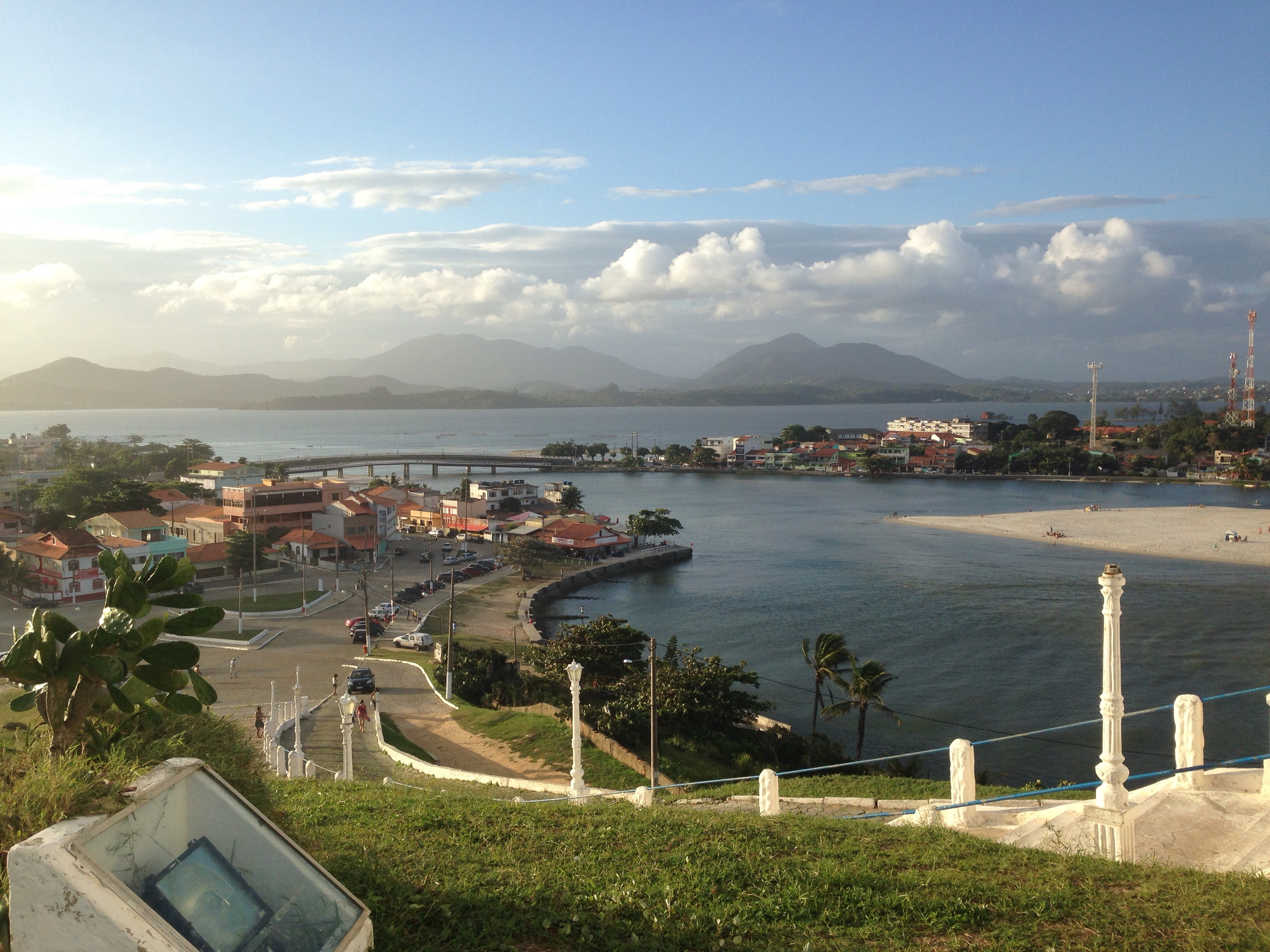
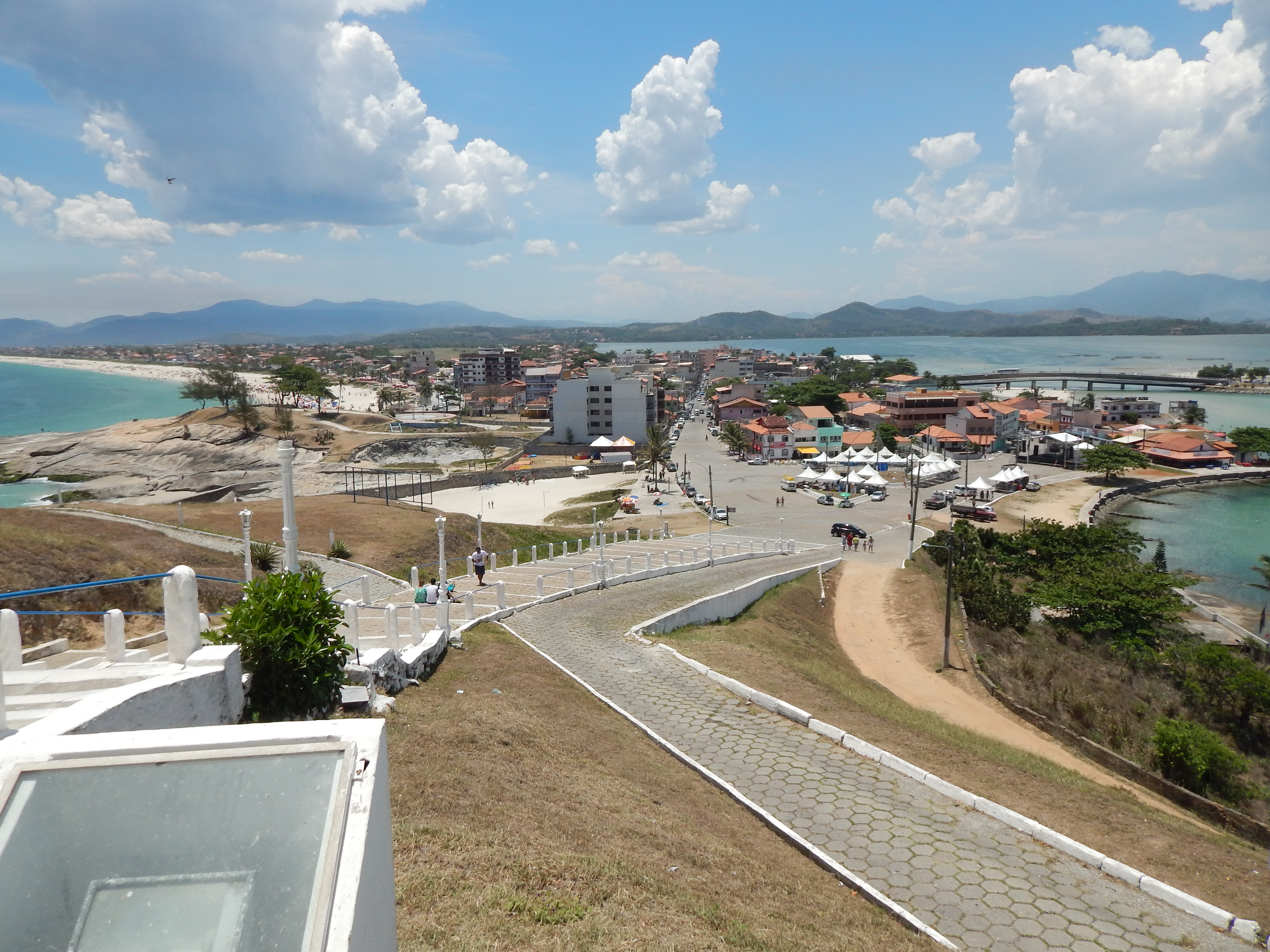
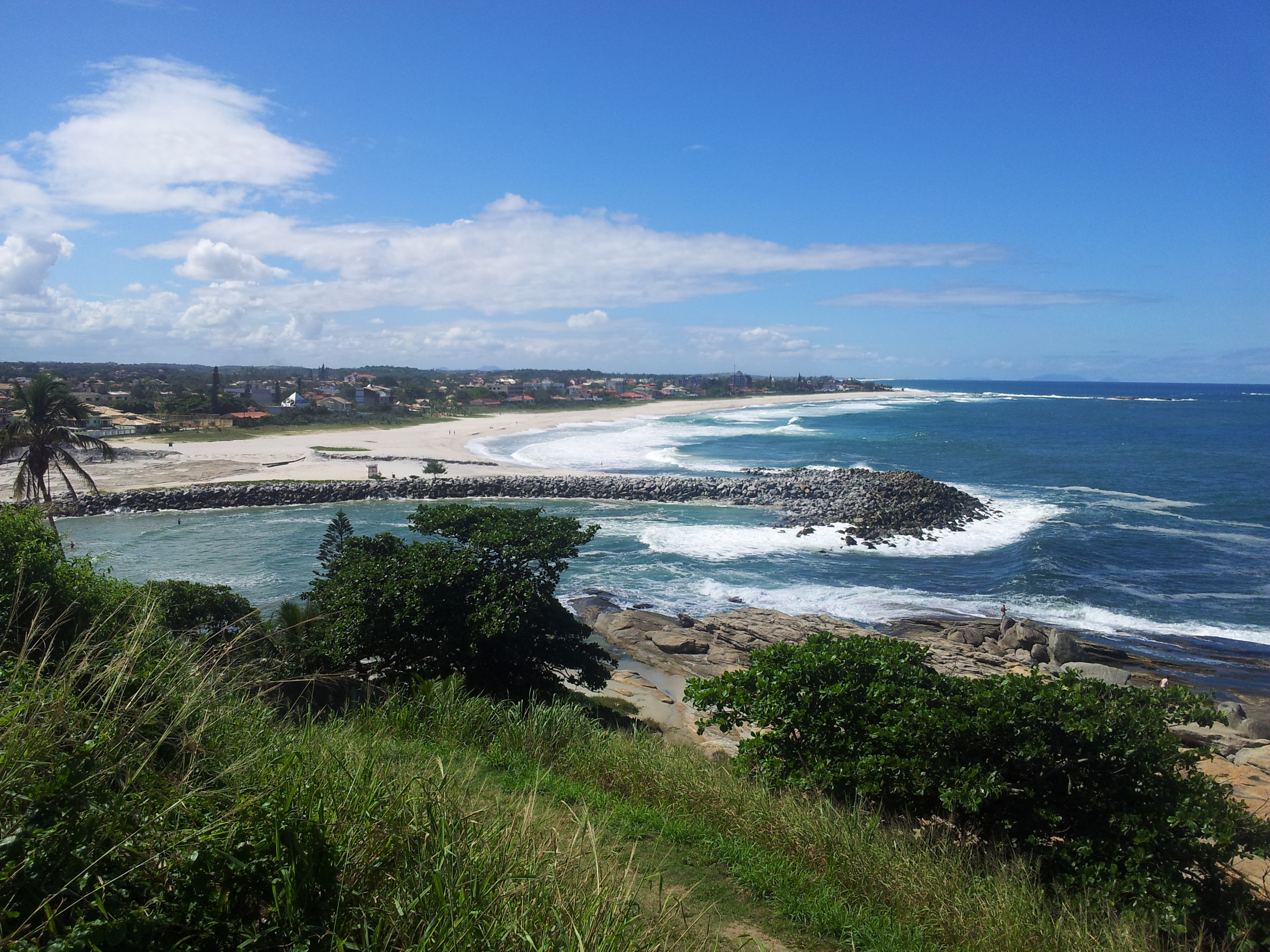
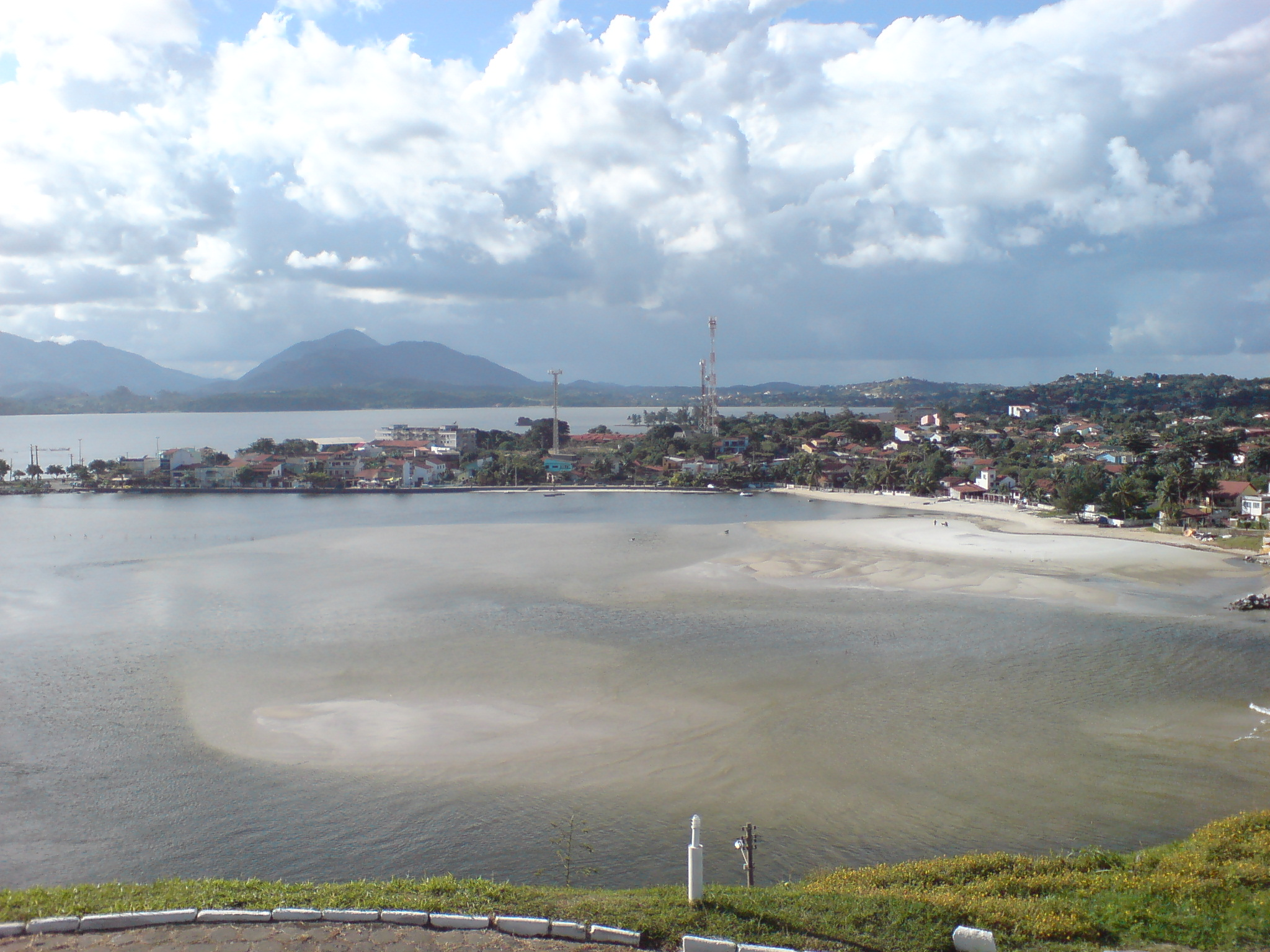
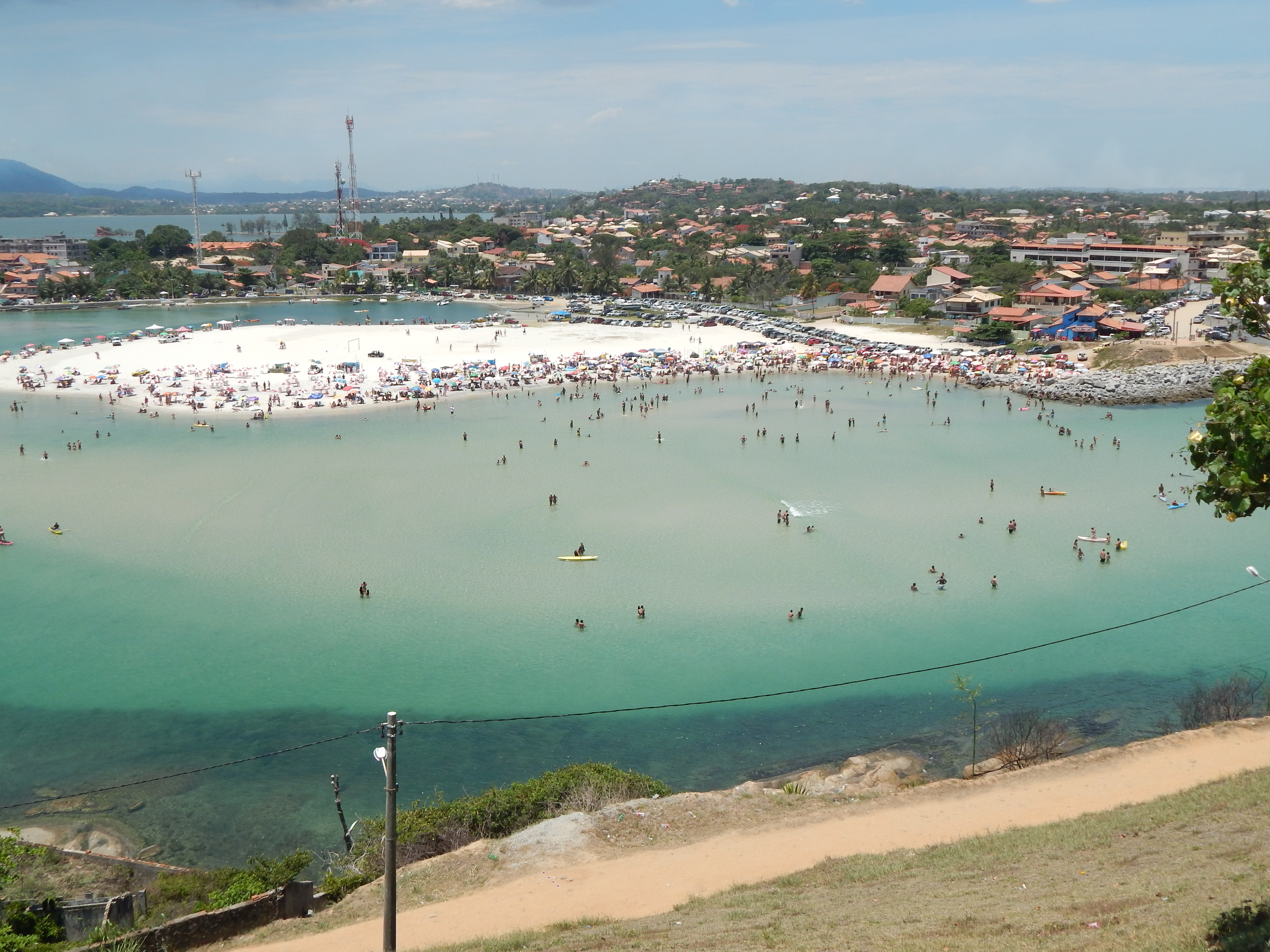
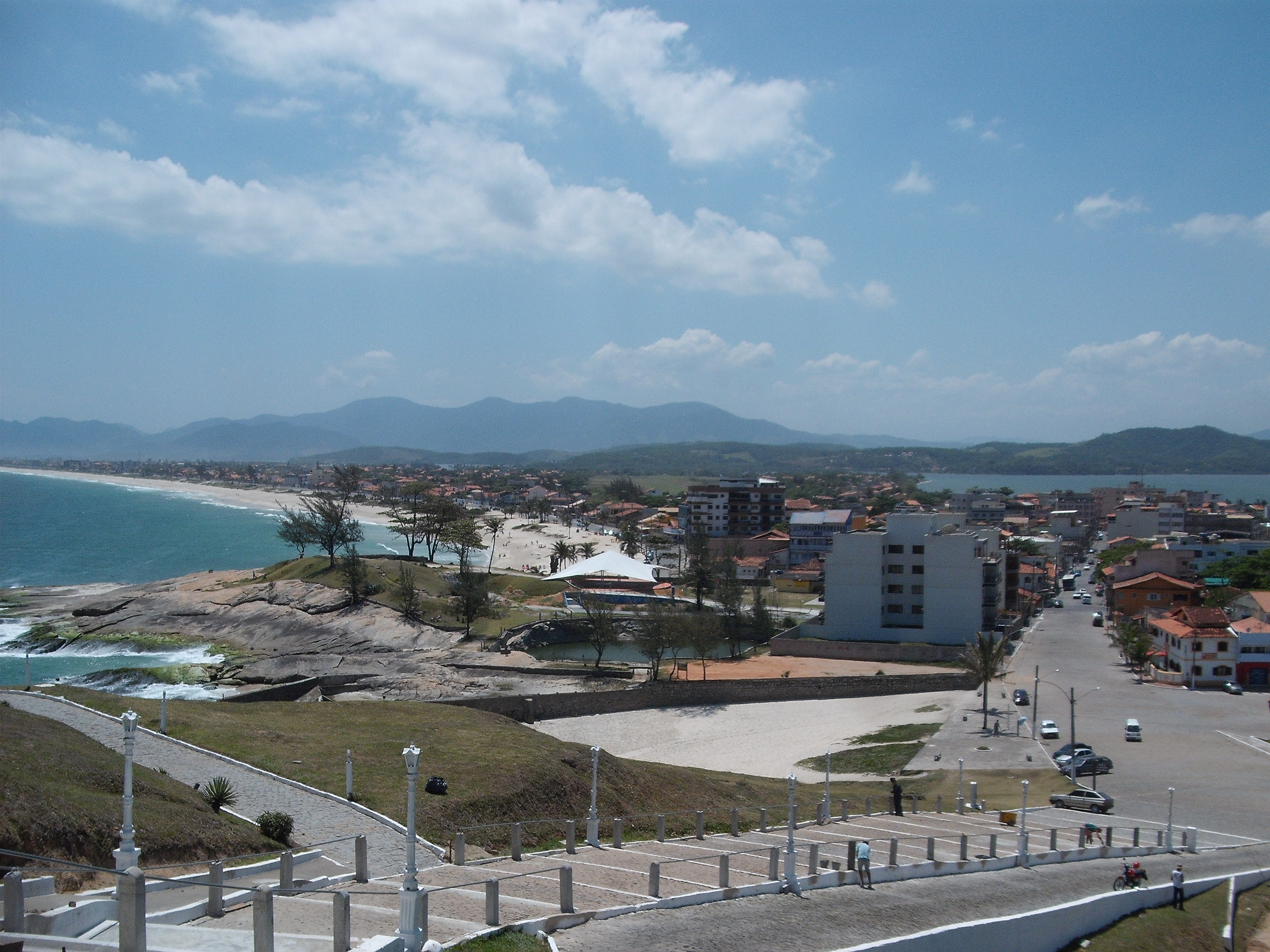
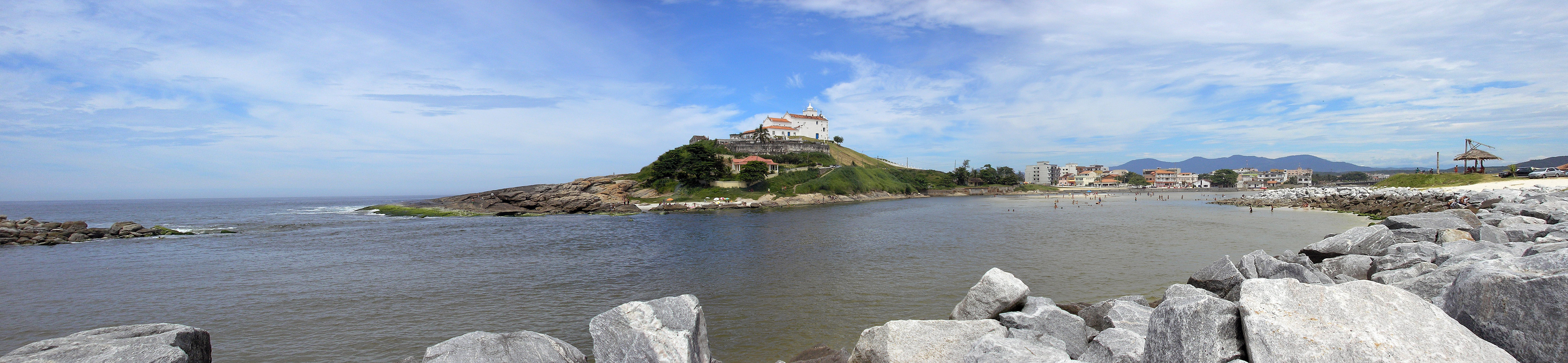

- Flag Coat of arms
- Nickname: Capital Nacional do Surfing
- Location in Rio de Janeiro
- Coordinates: 22°55′12″S 42°30′36″W
- Country: Brazil
- Region: Southeast
- State: Rio de Janeiro

Government
  - Mayor: Manoela Peres (UNIÃO)

Area
  - Total: 357 km^{2} (138 sq mi)
- Elevation: 2 m (6.6 ft)

Population (2020)
  - Total: 90,583
  - Density: 254/km^{2} (657/sq mi)
- Time zone: UTC−3 (BRT)
- HDI (2010): 0.709 – high
- Website: saquarema.rj.gov.br

Saquarema (Portuguese pronunciation: [sɐkwɐˈɾẽmɐ]) is a municipality located in the Brazilian state of Rio de Janeiro. Its population is 90,583 (2020) and its area is 357 km^{2}. It is located almost 73 km east of Rio de Janeiro. It was known as Brazil's surfing capital.

During the mid-19th century, the Conservative Party and its leaders were known as "Saquarema" because of their base of support here.

== The Surfing Capital ==
Saquarema, through its beaches, especially Itaúna Beach, is known as the Brazilian capital of surfing for its perfect waves and indescribable beauty and strength. In the 70's, Saquarema hosted the surfing festivals and in 2017, Saquarema became part of the world surfing circuit, with WSL.
