= 2023 World Surf League =

Professional surfing league season

- Location: Hawaii, Portugal, Australia, El Salvador, Brazil, South Africa, French Polynesia, United States
- Dates: January 29th 2023 – September 15th 2023

Champions
- Men: (Brazil) Filipe Toledo
- Women: (United States) Caroline Marks

The 2023 World Surf League was the 46th season of all iterations of the tour circuit for professional surfers. Billabong Pipe Masters was the first round of the tour.

For the third time, the season ended at Lower Trestles, in San Clemente, USA, where the top five seeded men and women from that season went head to head to determine the champion at the WSL Finals.

Filipe Toledo and Stephanie Gilmore were the defending champions. Toledo successfully retained his title whereas Caroline Marks was crowned women's champion for the first time.

The 2023 season also contributed towards qualification for the 2024 Summer Olympics, where surfing made its second appearance as an Olympic sport. The top ten surfers in the men's final standings and the top eight surfers in the women's final standings earned quota places at the Olympics, subject to a maximum of two men and two women per NOC.

== Qualifier athletes ==
The first five events of the 2023 Championship Tour will be contested by the WSL top 36 men and top 18 women.

The top 36 men consist of:

- The Top 22 finishers from the 2022 Championship Tour rankings
- The Top 10 finishers on the 2022 Challenger Series rankings
- Two WSL season wildcards
- Two event wildcards

The top 18 women consist of:

- The Top 10 finishers on the 2022 Championship Tour rankings
- The Top 5 finishers on the 2022 Challenger Series rankings
- Two WSL season wildcards
- One event wildcard

The 2023 CT season will start with 36 men and 18 women. Halfway through the season, the field will be reduced to 24 men and 12 women. The top-ranked surfers will automatically requalify for the 2024 CT, as well as continue on to the second half of the Tour, where they will be joined by one men's and one women's season-long wildcard, and one men's and one women's event wildcard.

=== Women's 2023 Championship Tour qualifiers ===
Top 10 Qualifiers from 2022 Championship Tour Rankings

- Stephanie Gilmore (AUS)
- Carissa Moore (HAW)
- Johanne Defay (FRA)
- Tatiana Weston-Webb (BRA)
- Brisa Hennessey (CRI)
- Lakey Peterson (USA)
- Courtney Conlogue (USA)
- Tyler Wright (AUS)
- Gabriela Bryan (HAW)
- Isabella Nichols (AUS)

Top 5 Qualifiers from 2022 Challenger Series Rankings

- Bettylou Sakura Johnson (HAW)
- Macy Callaghan (AUS)
- Molly Picklum (AUS)
- Caitlin Simmers (USA)
- Sophie McCulloch (AUS)

WSL Season Wildcards

- Caroline Marks (USA)
- Sally Fitzgibbons (AUS)

WSL Replacement

- Teresa Bonvalot (PRT)

=== Men's 2023 Championship Tour qualifiers ===
Top 22 Qualifiers from 2022 Championship Tour Rankings

- Filipe Toledo (BRA)
- Italo Ferreira (BRA)
- Jack Robinson (AUS)
- Ethan Ewing (AUS)
- Kanoa Igarashi (JPN)
- Miguel Pupo (BRA)
- Griffin Colapinto (USA)
- Caio Ibelli (BRA)
- Connor O'Leary (AUS)
- Callum Robson (AUS)
- Samuel Pupo (BRA)
- John John Florence (HAW)
- Matthew McGillivray (ZAF)
- Jordy Smith (ZAF)
- Kelly Slater (USA)
- Barron Mamiya (HAW)
- Nat Young (USA)
- Jake Marshall (USA)
- Kolohe Andino (USA)
- Jadson Andre (BRA)
- Seth Moniz (HAW)
- Jackson Baker (AUS)

Top 10 Qualifiers from 2022 Challenger Series Rankings

- Leonardo Fioravanti (ITA)
- Ryan Callinan (AUS)
- Rio Waida (IND)
- Maxime Huscenot (FRA)
- Ramzi Boukhiam (MAR)
- Michael Rodrigues (BRA)
- Ian Gentil (HAW)
- Joao Chianca (BRA)
- Liam O'Brien (AUS)
- Ezekiel Lau (HAW)

WSL Season Wildcards

- Gabriel Medina (BRA)
- Yago Dora (BRA)

WSL Replacement

- Carlos Munoz (CRI)

== Schedule ==
The championship series will consist of the following events, subject to change due to the COVID-19 pandemic.

Round	Date	Event	Location
1	January 29 – February 10	(Hawaii) Billabong Pro Pipeline	Banzai Pipeline, Oahu, Hawaii
2	February 12–23	(Hawaii) Hurley Pro Sunset Beach	Sunset Beach, Oahu, Hawaii
3	March 8–16	MEO Rip Curl Pro Portugal	Supertubos, Peniche, Portugal
4	April 4–14	(Australia) Rip Curl Pro Bells Beach	Bells Beach, Victoria, Australia
5	April 20–30	(Australia) Margaret River Pro	Margaret River, Western Australia, Australia
6	May 27–28	(United States) Surf Ranch Pro	Lemoore, California, United States
7	June 9–18	Surf City El Salvador Pro	Punta Roca, La Libertad, El Salvador
8	June 23 – July 1	(Brazil) Vivo Rio Pro	Saquarema, Rio de Janeiro, Brazil
9	July 13–22	(South Africa) Corona Open J-Bay	Jeffreys Bay, Eastern Cape, South Africa
10	August 11–20	(French Polynesia) SHISEIDO Tahiti Pro	Teahupo'o, Tahiti, French Polynesia
11	September 7–15	(United States) Rip Curl WSL Finals	San Clemente, California, United States

== Results and standings ==
=== Event results ===
Round	Event	Men's champion	Men's runner-up	Women's champion	Women's runner-up
1	(Hawaii) Billabong Pro Pipeline	(Australia) Jack Robinson	(Italy) Leonardo Fioravanti	(Hawaii) Carissa Moore	(Australia) Tyler Wright
2	(Hawaii) Hurley Pro Sunset Beach	(Brazil) Filipe Toledo	(United States) Griffin Colapinto	(Australia) Molly Picklum	(United States) Caroline Marks
3	MEO Rip Curl Pro Portugal	(Brazil) João Chianca	(Australia) Jack Robinson	(United States) Caitlin Simmers	(United States) Courtney Conlogue
4	(Australia) Rip Curl Pro Bells Beach	(Australia) Ethan Ewing	(Australia) Ryan Callinan	(Australia) Tyler Wright	(Australia) Molly Picklum
5	(Australia) Margaret River Pro	(Brazil) Gabriel Medina	(United States) Griffin Colapinto	(Hawaii) Carissa Moore	(Australia) Tyler Wright
6	(United States) Surf Ranch Pro	(United States) Griffin Colapinto	(Brazil) Italo Ferreira	(Hawaii) Carissa Moore	(United States) Caroline Marks
7	Surf City El Salvador Pro	(Brazil) Filipe Toledo	(United States) Griffin Colapinto	(United States) Caroline Marks	(Australia) Tyler Wright
8	(Brazil) VIVO Rio Pro	(Brazil) Yago Dora	(Australia) Ethan Ewing	(United States) Caitlin Simmers	(Australia) Tyler Wright
9	(South Africa) Corona Open J-Bay	(Brazil) Filipe Toledo	(Australia) Ethan Ewing	(United States) Lakey Peterson	(Australia) Molly Picklum
10	(French Polynesia) SHISEIDO Tahiti Pro	(Australia) Jack Robinson	(Brazil) Gabriel Medina	(United States) Caroline Marks	(United States) Caitlin Simmers
11	(United States) Rip Curl WSL Finals	(Brazil) Filipe Toledo	(Australia) Ethan Ewing	(United States) Caroline Marks	(Hawaii) Carissa Moore

=== Men's standings ===
Points are awarded using the following structure:

Position	1st	2nd	3rd	5th	9th	17th	33rd	INJ	WTD	DNC
Points	10,000	7,800	6,085	4,745	3,320	1,330	265	265	265	0

Position	+/-	Surfer	(Hawaii) WCT 1	(Hawaii) WCT 2	(Portugal) WCT 3	(Australia) WCT 4	(Australia) WCT 5	(United States) WCT 6	(El Salvador) WCT 7	(Brazil) WCT 8	(South Africa) WCT 9	(French Polynesia) WCT 10	(United States) Finals	Points
1	Steady	Filipe Toledo (BRA) (O)	5th	1st	~~17th~~	3rd	5th	3rd	1st	9th	1st	9th	1st	58,300
2	1	Ethan Ewing (AUS) (O)	~~17th~~	5th	9th	1st	5th	3rd	9th	2nd	2nd	INJ	2nd	48,080
3	1	Griffin Colapinto (USA) (O)	~~17th~~	2nd	5th	5th	2nd	1st	2nd	17th	9th	9th	3rd	50,860
4	Steady	João Chianca (BRA) (O)	3rd	3rd	1st	~~9th~~	3rd	5th	9th	9th	9th	17th	4th	44,290
5	Steady	Jack Robinson (AUS) (O)	1st	3rd	2nd	17th	~~INJ~~	17th	17th	17th	5th	1st	5th	43,950
6	Steady	Gabriel Medina (BRA)	9th	9th	9th	~~9th~~	1st	5th	9th	17th	3rd	2nd	–	43,240
7	Steady	Yago Dora (BRA)	9th	~~17th~~	3rd	9th	9th	5th	17th	1st	5th	5th	–	41,610
8	Steady	John John Florence (HAW) (O)	5th	9th	~~17th~~	3rd	3rd	9th	17th	3rd	9th	5th	–	39,035
9	Steady	Leonardo Fioravanti (ITA) (O)	2nd	9th	17th	~~17th~~	9th	5th	9th	5th	9th	3rd	–	37,985
10	Steady	Ryan Callinan (AUS)	9th	~~17th~~	9th	2nd	9th	9th	17th	3rd	9th	17th	–	33,145
11	Steady	Connor O'Leary (AUS)	17th	~~33rd~~	5th	5th	5th	9th	5th	17th	5th	17th	–	31,035
12	Steady	Barron Mamiya (HAW)	17th	17th	9th	~~17th~~	5th	17th	5th	5th	9th	3rd	–	30,950
13	Steady	Ítalo Ferreira (BRA)	17th	9th	9th	~~17th~~	9th	2nd	5th	9th	17th	INJ	–	28,750
14	Steady	Kanoa Igarashi (JPN) (O)	17th	9th	17th	9th	~~17th~~	9th	5th	9th	3rd	17th	–	28,100
14	Steady	Ian Gentil (HAW)	9th	17th	9th	17th	~~17th~~	17th	3rd	9th	5th	9th	–	28,100
16	Steady	Jordy Smith (RSA) (O)	5th	17th	~~17th~~	9th	9th	9th	17th	9th	9th	9th	–	27,325
17	Steady	Liam O'Brien (AUS)	5th	17th	17th	~~17th~~	9th	17th	3rd	9th	17th	9th	–	26,110
18	Steady	Caio Ibelli (BRA)	3rd	5th	9th	17th	~~17th~~	17th	9th	17th	17th	17th	–	24,120
19	Steady	Matthew McGillivray (RSA) (O)	~~33rd~~	5th	17th	5th	9th	9th	17th	17th	17th	17th	–	22,780
20	Steady	Callum Robson (AUS)	9th	17th	3rd	~~33rd~~	9th	17th	9th	17th	17th	17th	–	22,695
21	Steady	Rio Waida (INA)	9th	17th	5th	33rd	~~33rd~~	17th	9th	17th	9th	9th	–	22,280
22	Steady	Seth Moniz (HAW)	9th	9th	17th	17th	~~17th~~	INJ	9th	9th	17th	9th	–	20,855
23	Steady	Kelly Slater (USA)	17th	9th	17th	17th	~~17th~~	9th	17th	INJ	17th	9th	–	16,875
Cut after mid-season
24	Steady	Jackson Baker (AUS)	17th	17th	17th	5th	~~17th~~	–	–	–	–	–	–	8,735
24	Steady	Nat Young (USA)	17th	5th	17th	17th	~~17th~~	–	–	–	–	–	–	8,735
24	Steady	Samuel Pupo (BRA)	17th	17th	5th	17th	~~17th~~	–	–	~~5th~~	–	–	–	8,735
27	Steady	Miguel Pupo (BRA)	9th	9th	17th	INJ	~~INJ~~	–	–	–	–	–	–	8,235
28	Steady	Michael Rodrigues (BRA)	17th	17th	17th	9th	~~33rd~~	–	–	–	–	–	–	7,310
29	Steady	Maxime Huscenot (FRA)	17th	33th	~~33rd~~	9th	17th	–	–	–	–	–	–	6,245
30	Steady	Jake Marshall (USA)	17th	17th	17th	~~33rd~~	17th	–	–	–	–	–	–	5,320
30	Steady	Kolohe Andino (USA)	17th	17th	~~33rd~~	17th	17th	–	–	–	–	–	–	5,320
32	Steady	Carlos Muñoz Herrera (CRC)	17th	17th	17th	33rd	~~33rd~~	–	–	–	–	–	–	4,255
32	Steady	Ezekiel Lau (HAW)	17th	33th	~~33rd~~	17th	17th	–	–	–	–	–	–	4,255
34	Steady	Jadson André (BRA)	33rd	INJ	INJ	INJ	~~INJ~~	–	–	~~5th~~	–	–	–	1,060
34	Steady	Ramzi Boukhiam (MAR)	INJ	INJ	INJ	INJ	~~INJ~~	–	–	–	–	–	–	1,060
WC	Steady	Imaikalani deVault (HAW)	~~33rd~~	–	–	–	–	–	–	–	–	–	–	0
WC	Steady	Joshua Moniz (HAW)	~~33rd~~	–	–	–	–	–	–	–	–	–	–	0
WC	Steady	Kai Lenny (HAW)	–	~~33rd~~	–	–	–	–	–	–	–	–	–	0
WC	Steady	Eli Hanneman (HAW)	–	~~17th~~	–	–	–	–	–	–	–	–	–	0
WC	Steady	Keanu Asing (HAW)	–	~~17th~~	–	–	–	–	–	–	–	–	–	0
WC	Steady	Frederico Morais (POR)	–	–	~~33rd~~	–	–	–	–	–	–	–	–	0
WC	Steady	Tiago Carrique (FRA)	–	–	~~17th~~	–	–	–	–	–	–	–	–	0
WC	Steady	Joan Duru (FRA)	–	–	~~9th~~	–	–	–	–	–	–	–	–	0
WC	Steady	Owen Wright (AUS)	–	–	–	~~17th~~	–	–	–	–	–	–	–	0
WC	Steady	Morgan Cibilic (AUS)	–	–	–	~~17th~~	–	–	–	–	–	–	–	0
WC	Steady	Dylan Moffat (AUS)	–	–	–	~~17th~~	–	–	–	–	–	–	–	0
WC	Steady	Xavier Huxtable (AUS)	–	–	–	~~9th~~	–	–	–	–	–	–	–	0
WC	Steady	Jack Thomas (AUS)	–	–	–	–	~~33rd~~	–	–	–	–	–	–	0
WC	Steady	Jacob Willcox (AUS)	–	–	–	–	~~17th~~	–	–	–	–	–	–	0
WC	Steady	Reef Heazlewood (AUS)	–	–	–	–	~~17th~~	–	–	–	–	–	–	0
WC	Steady	Jarvis Earle (AUS)	–	–	–	–	~~17th~~	–	–	–	–	–	–	0
WC	Steady	Jerome Forrest (AUS)	–	–	–	–	~~17th~~	–	–	–	–	–	–	0
WC	Steady	Cole Houshmand (USA)	–	–	–	–	–	~~17th~~	–	–	–	–	–	0
WC	Steady	Jett Schilling (USA)	–	–	–	–	–	~~9th~~	–	–	–	–	–	0
WC	Steady	Bryan Perez (ESA)	–	–	–	–	–	–	~~17th~~	–	–	–	–	0
WC	Steady	Adin Masencamp (RSA)	–	–	–	–	–	–	–	–	~~17th~~	–	–	0
WC	Steady	Matahi Drollet (FRA)	–	–	–	–	–	–	–	–	–	~~17th~~	–	0
WC	Steady	Kauli Vaast (FRA)	–	–	–	–	–	–	–	–	–	~~5th~~	–	0
WC	Steady	Mihimana Braye (FRA)	–	–	–	–	–	–	–	–	–	~~5th~~	–	0

- Event Wild Card Surfers do not receive points for the WSL. Their results on each event are indicated on the above table but no ranking points are awarded.

Kelly Slater received the WC for the 2023/24 and as a former World Champion, his points for the remaining of the season will count.

Miguel Pupo received the WC for the 2024 season, due to injury at the Bells Beach event. Miguel and Kelly are the WSL Season Wildcards at CT 2024.

(Q) The athlete has qualified for the Final Five

(E) The athlete has no chance of qualifying for the Final Five

(O) The athlete has qualified for the Olympic Games, pending ratification from its NOC

=== Women's standings ===
Points are awarded using the following structure:

Position	1st	2nd	3rd	5th	9th	17th	INJ	WTD	DNC
Points	10,000	7,800	6,085	4,745	2,610	1,045	1,045	1,045	0

Position	+/-	Surfer	(Hawaii) WCT 1	(Hawaii) WCT 2	(Portugal) WCT 3	(Australia) WCT 4	(Australia) WCT 5	(United States) WCT 6	(El Salvador) WCT 7	(Brazil) WCT 8	(South Africa) WCT 9	(French Polynesia) WCT 10	(United States) Finals	Points
1	2	Caroline Marks (USA) (O)	9th	2nd	~~9th~~	5th	3rd	2nd	1st	3rd	5th	1st	1st	59,870
2	1	Carissa Moore (HAW) (O)	1st	5th	~~9th~~	5th	1st	1st	3rd	3rd	3rd	5th	2nd	62,490
3	1	Tyler Wright (AUS) (O)	2nd	3rd	~~17th~~	1st	2nd	9th	2nd	2nd	3rd	3rd	3rd	62,065
4	1	Caitlin Simmers (USA)	9th	5th	1st	9th	~~9th~~	3rd	9th	1st	9th	2nd	4th	49,070
5	1	Molly Picklum (AUS) (O)	5th	1st	5th	2nd	~~5th~~	5th	5th	5th	2nd	5th	5th	54,070
6	Steady	Stephanie Gilmore (AUS)	~~17th~~	5th	9th	3rd	5th	5th	3rd	9th	5th	5th	–	41,115
7	Steady	Lakey Peterson (USA)	3rd	9th	~~17th~~	9th	5th	5th	9th	5th	1st	9th	–	40,760
8	Steady	Tatiana Weston-Webb (BRA) (O)	5th	9th	3rd	5th	~~9th~~	3rd	5th	9th	9th	5th	–	38,980
9	Steady	Gabriela Bryan (HAW)	5th	3rd	9th	9th	~~9th~~	9th	5th	5th	5th	9th	–	35,505
10	Steady	Bettylou Sakura Johnson (HAW)	3rd	9th	9th	5th	~~9th~~	9th	5th	5th	9th	INJ	–	31,805
11	Steady	Johanne Defay (FRA) (O)	INJ	INJ	~~INJ~~	17th	9th	5th	9th	9th	9th	9th	–	20,930
Cut after mid-season
12	Steady	Brisa Hennessy (CRI) (O)	5th	5th	9th	~~17th~~	9th	–	–	–	–	–	–	14,710
12	Steady	Sally Fitzgibbons (AUS)	9th	9th	5th	~~9th~~	5th	–	–	–	–	–	–	14,710
14	Steady	Courtney Conlogue (USA)	17th	~~17th~~	2nd	9th	9th	–	–	–	–	–	–	14,065
15	Steady	Isabella Nichols (AUS)	9th	9th	9th	3rd	~~17th~~	–	–	–	–	–	–	13,915
15	Steady	Macy Callaghan (AUS)	9th	9th	3rd	9th	~~17th~~	–	–	–	–	–	–	13,915
17	Steady	Sophie McCulloch (AUS)	INJ	~~INJ~~	5th	9th	9th	–	–	–	–	–	–	11,010
18	Steady	Teresa Bonvalot (POR) (O)	9th	17th	9th	–	–	–	–	–	–	–	–	6,265
WC	Steady	Bronte Macaulay (AUS)	–	–	–	–	~~3rd~~	–	–	–	–	–	–	0
WC	Steady	Yolanda Hopkins (POR)	–	–	~~5th~~	–	–	–	–	–	–	–	–	0
WC	Steady	Alyssa Spencer (USA)	~~9th~~	–	–	–	–	~~5th~~	–	–	–	–	–	0
WC	Steady	Moana Jones Wong (HAW)	~~9th~~	–	–	–	–	–	–	–	–	–	–	0
WC	Steady	Zoe McDougall (HAW)	–	~~9th~~	–	–	–	–	–	–	–	–	–	0
WC	Steady	Luana Silva (BRA)	–	~~9th~~	–	–	–	–	–	–	–	–	–	0
WC	Steady	Kobie Enright (AUS)	–	–	–	~~9th~~	–	–	–	–	–	–	–	0
WC	Steady	Leilani McGonagle (CRC)	–	–	–	–	–	–	~~9th~~	–	–	–	–	0
WC	Steady	Silvana Lima (BRA)	–	–	–	–	–	–	–	~~9th~~	–	–	–	0
WC	Steady	Sarah Baum (RSA)	–	–	–	–	–	–	–	–	~~9th~~	–	–	0
WC	Steady	Vahiné Fierro (FRA)	–	–	–	–	–	–	–	–	–	~~3rd~~	–	0
WC	Steady	Aelan Vaast (FRA)	–	–	–	–	–	–	–	–	–	~~9th~~	–	0

- Event Wild Card Surfers do not receive points for the WSL. Their results on each event are indicated on the above table but no ranking points are awarded.

Johanne Defay received the WC for the 2023/24 and as a former Final Five, her points for the remaining of the season will count.

Johanne and Brisa are the WSL Season Wildcards at CT 2024.

(Q) The athlete has qualified for the Final Five

(E) The athlete has no chance of qualifying for the Final Five

(O) The athlete has qualified for the Olympic Games, pending ratification from its NOC

== Challenger Series ==
=== 2023 Men's Challenger Series ===
Round	Event	Men's champion	Men's runner-up
1	(Australia) Boost Mobile Gold Coast Pro	(Brazil) Samuel Pupo	(Hawaii) Imaikalani deVault
2	(Australia) GWM Sydney Surf Pro	(United States) Cole Houshmand	(Australia) Jacob Willcox
3	(South Africa) Ballito Pro	(United States) Cole Houshmand	(Portugal) Frederico Morais
4	(United States) Wallex US Open of Surfing	(Hawaii) Eli Hanneman	(United States) Crosby Colapinto
5	(Portugal) EDP Vissla Ericeira Pro	(Brazil) Deivid Silva	(United States) Jake Marshall
6	(Brazil) Corona Saquarema Pro	(Brazil) Samuel Pupo	(France) Mihimana Braye

Position	1st	2nd	3rd	5th	9th	17th	25th	33rd	49th	65th	73rd
Points	10,000	7,800	6,085	4,745	3,320	1,900	1,700	700	600	300	250

Ranking	+/-	Surfer	Events						Points
Ranking	+/-	Surfer	(Australia) 1	(Australia) 2	(South Africa) 3	(United States) 4	(Portugal) 5	(Brazil) 6	Points
1	Steady	Cole Houshmand (USA)	~~33rd~~	1st	1st	9th	5th	~~17th~~	28,065
2	Steady	Samuel Pupo (BRA)	1st	~~33rd~~	~~33rd~~	25th	25th	1st	23,400
3	Steady	Jacob Willcox (AUS)	5th	2nd	5th	~~9th~~	5th	~~17th~~	22,035
4	Steady	Crosby Colapinto (USA)	3rd	25th	~~33rd~~	2nd	~~33rd~~	3rd	21,670
5	Steady	Eli Hanneman (HAW)	~~65th~~	9th	25th	1st	~~49th~~	3rd	21,105
6	Steady	Imaikalani deVault (HAW)	2nd	9th	~~25th~~	~~25th~~	9th	5th	19,185
6	Steady	Frederico Morais (POR)	~~25th~~	5th	2nd	~~33rd~~	9th	9th	19,185
8	Steady	Jake Marshall (USA)	~~33rd~~	25th	9th	5th	2nd	~~25th~~	17,565
9	Steady	Kade Matson (USA)	~~49th~~	5th	3rd	~~33rd~~	9th	9th	17,470
10	Steady	Deivid Silva (BRA)	~~49th~~	~~25th~~	17th	9th	1st	17th	17,120
CT Qualification Line
11	Steady	Michael Rodrigues (BRA)	5th	~~33rd~~	~~17th~~	9th	9th	5th	16,130
12	Steady	Mateus Herdy (BRA)	17th	~~33rd~~	~~17th~~	5th	3rd	9th	16,050
13	Steady	Jackson Baker (AUS)	~~25th~~	3rd	9th	~~25th~~	9th	9th	16,045
14	Steady	Marco Mignot (FRA)	~~33rd~~	3rd	17th	~~49th~~	17th	5th	14,630
15	Steady	Jett Schilling (USA)	3rd	17th	~~33rd~~	9th	~~49th~~	17th	13,205
16	Steady	Morgan Cibilic (AUS)	25th	5th	9th	9th	~~49th~~	~~33rd~~	13,085
17	Steady	Joan Duru (FRA)	~~33rd~~	9th	3rd	25th	~~33rd~~	25th	12,805
18	Steady	Nolan Rapoza (USA)	–	–	5th	3rd	49th	49th	12,030
19	Steady	Reef Heazlewood (AUS)	17th	25th	~~49th~~	5th	9th	~~25th~~	11,665
19	Steady	George Pittar (AUS)	25th	~~33rd~~	9th	5th	17th	~~25th~~	11,665
21	Steady	Jadson André (BRA)	5th	25th	~~33rd~~	9th	~~49th~~	25th	11,465
22	Steady	Dimitri Poulos (USA)	49th	~~65th~~	9th	~~65th~~	3rd	49th	10,605

Legend

- Note: The top 10 men qualified for the 2024 Championship Tour.

Men's CT 2024

=== 2023 Women's Challengers Series ===
Round	Event	Women's champion	Women's runner-up
1	(Australia) Boost Mobile Gold Coast Pro	(Australia) India Robinson	(United States) Sawyer Lindblad
2	(Australia) GWM Sydney Surf Pro	(Australia) Isabella Nichols	(Australia) Sally Fitzgibbons
3	(South Africa) Ballito Pro	(Australia) Bronte Macaulay	(France) Vahiné Fierro
4	(United States) Wallex US Open of Surfing	(United States) Sawyer Lindblad	(Australia) Sally Fitzgibbons
5	(Portugal) EDP Vissla Ericeira Pro	(United States) Alyssa Spencer	(Brazil) Luana Silva
6	(Brazil) Corona Saquarema Pro	(Canada) Erin Brooks	(Australia) Sophie McCulloch

Position	1st	2nd	3rd	5th	9th	17th	25th	33rd	41st
Points	10,000	7,800	6,085	4,745	3,320	1,900	1,700	700	650

Ranking	+/-	Surfer	Events						Points
Ranking	+/-	Surfer	(Australia) 1	(Australia) 2	(South Africa) 3	(United States) 4	(Portugal) 5	(Brazil) 6	Points
1	Steady	India Robinson (AUS)	1st	3rd	–	~~9th~~	3rd	5th	26,915
2	Steady	Sally Fitzgibbons (AUS)	3rd	2nd	~~5th~~	2nd	5th	~~9th~~	26,430
3	Steady	Sawyer Lindblad (USA)	2nd	~~17th~~	~~17th~~	1st	9th	5th	25,865
4	Steady	Alyssa Spencer (USA)	~~9th~~	5th	5th	~~17th~~	1st	5th	24,235
5	Steady	Isabella Nichols (AUS)	9th	1st	3rd	9th	~~25th~~	~~9th~~	22,725
CT Qualification Line
6	Steady	Luana Silva (BRA)	5th	~~17th~~	9th	5th	2nd	~~9th~~	20,610
7	Steady	Bronte Macaulay (AUS)	~~25th~~	17th	1st	9th	5th	~~17th~~	19,965
8	Steady	Nadia Erostarbe (SPA)	–	–	5th	5th	9th	3rd	18,895
9	Steady	Erin Brooks (CAN)	~~25th~~	5th	~~33rd~~	17th	25th	1st	18,345
10	Steady	Vahiné Fierro (FRA)	5th	~~25th~~	2nd	~~17th~~	17th	9th	17,765
11	Steady	Sophie McCulloch (AUS)	~~9th~~	9th	9th	~~25th~~	9th	2nd	17,760
12	Steady	Francisca Veselko (POR)	9th	9th	~~33rd~~	~~33rd~~	5th	3rd	17,470
12	Steady	Ellie Harrison (AUS)	9th	~~25th~~	9th	3rd	5th	~~25th~~	17,470

Legend Note: The top 5 qualified for the 2024 Championship Tour.

Women's CT 2024
