= 2021 World Surf League =

Professional surfing league season

2020–21 World Surf League
- Location: Hawaii, Australia, The United States of America, Mexico
- Dates: December 4th 2020 – September 17th 2021

Champions
- Men: (Brazil) Gabriel Medina
- Women: (Hawaii) Carissa Moore

The 2020–21 World Surf League was the 44th season of all iterations of the tour circuit for professional surfers. After the 2020 season was cancelled due to the COVID-19 pandemic, limiting international travel between and within countries namely Australia, Indonesia, Portugal and South Africa. The championships took a break for the 2020 Tokyo Olympics. The board changed the tour to a wraparound season of 2020–21, which allowed major changes to the tour schedule, with the Billabong Pipe Masters becoming the first round of the tour.

The season also saw some new events introduced due to COVID-19 outbreaks and restrictions on travel within countries, notably Australia, who required surfers to quarantine in Sydney for 14 days upon arrival. Narrabeen was chosen as a replacement for the Gold Coast, while Newcastle returned to the tour for the first time in 10 years to replace Bells Beach. The women's championship tour will compete in Teahupo'o, French Polynesia for the first time in 15 years, while Mexico was added to the championship for the first time to replace the round left vacant by Jeffrey's Bay, due to the COVID outbreak in South Africa.

For the first time, the season will end at Lower Trestles, in San Clemente, USA, with the top five seeded men and women from the season going head to head to determine the champion at the WSL Finals. This was put in place after the positive response to the men's championship event in 2019, as well as allowing surfers who had to isolate with COVID-19 an opportunity to still win the title.

Carissa Moore and Ítalo Ferreira were the defending champions.

== Schedule ==
The championship series will consist of the following events, subject to change due to the COVID-19 pandemic.

Round	Date	Event	Location
1	December 8–20	(Hawaii) Billabong Pipe Masters	Banzai Pipeline, Oahu, Hawaii
2	April 1–11	(Australia) Rip Curl Newcastle Cup	Newcastle, New South Wales, Australia
3	April 16–26	(Australia) Rip Curl Narrabeen Classic	Narrabeen, New South Wales, Australia
4	May 2–12	(Australia) Boost Mobile Margaret River Pro	Margaret River, Western Australia, Australia
5	May 16–26	(Australia) Rip Curl Rottnest Search	Rottnest Island, Western Australia, Australia
6	June 25–27	(United States) Jeep Surf Ranch Pro	Lemoore, California, United States
7	August 10–20	Corona Open Mexico	Barra de la Cruz, Oaxaca, Mexico
8	September 9–17	(United States) Rip Curl WSL Finals	San Clemente, California, United States

Events cancelled or moved during the 2021 season
Date	Event	Location	Reason
December 4–20	(Hawaii) Maui Pro presented by ROXY	Honolua Bay, Maui, Hawaii	Nearby fatal shark attack. Contest moved to Pipeline with Men's event.
February 2–12	(United States) Santa Cruz Pro	Santa Cruz, California, United States	COVID-19 outbreak in Southern California, restrictions on public events. Originally brought in to replace Portugal.
February 18–28	MEO Rip Curl Pro Portugal	Supertubos, Peniche, Portugal	COVID-19 outbreak and restrictions on international travel into Europe.
April 1–11	(Australia) Rip Curl Pro Bells Beach	Torquay, Victoria, Australia	Deal with New South Wales Government to quarantine surfers in Sydney. Event moved to Newcastle.
May 3–13	(Australia) Corona Open Gold Coast men's event / women's event	Gold Coast, Queensland, Australia	COVID-19 travel restrictions to Queensland from Sydney. Event moved to Narrabeen.
June 25- July 9	(South Africa) Corona Open J-Bay	Jeffreys Bay, Eastern Cape, South Africa	COVID-19 outbreak of South African variant. Replaced by Corona Open Mexico.
Scheduled June	(Indonesia) Quicksilver Pro G-Land	Alas Purwo National Park, East Java, Indonesia	COVID-19 outbreak and travel restrictions within Indonesia.
August 11–16	(Brazil) Oi Rio Pro	Saquarema, Rio de Janeiro, Brazil	COVID-19
August 24- September 3	(French Polynesia) Outerknown Tahiti Pro	Teahupo'o, Tahiti, French Polynesia	

== Results and standings ==
=== Event results ===
Round	Event	Men's champion	Men's runner-up	Women's champion	Women's runner-up
1	(Hawaii) Billabong Pipeline Masters	John John Florence (HAW)	Gabriel Medina (BRA)	Tyler Wright (AUS)	Carissa Moore (HAW)
2	(Australia) Rip Curl Newcastle Cup	Italo Ferreira (BRA)	Gabriel Medina (BRA)	Carissa Moore (HAW)	Isabella Nichols (AUS)
3	(Australia) Rip Curl Narrabeen Classic	Gabriel Medina (BRA)	Conner Coffin (USA)	Caroline Marks (USA)	Tatiana Weston-Webb (BRA)
4	(Australia) Boost Mobile Margaret River Pro	Filipe Toledo (BRA)	Jordy Smith (ZAF)	Tatiana Weston-Webb (BRA)	Stephanie Gilmore (AUS)
5	(Australia) Rip Curl Rottnest Search	Gabriel Medina (BRA)	Morgan Cibilic (AUS)	Sally Fitzgibbons (AUS)	Johanne Defay (FRA)
6	(United States) Jeep Surf Ranch Pro	Filipe Toledo (BRA)	Gabriel Medina (BRA)	Johanne Defay (FRA)	Carissa Moore (HAW)
7	Corona Open Mexico	Jack Robinson (AUS)	Deivid Silva (BRA)	Stephanie Gilmore (AUS)	Malia Manuel (HAW)
8	(United States) Rip Curl WSL Finals	Gabriel Medina (BRA)	Filipe Toledo (BRA)	Carissa Moore (HAW)	Tatiana Weston-Webb (BRA)

=== Men's standings ===
Points are awarded using the following structure:

Position	1st	2nd	3rd	5th	9th	17th	33rd	INJ	WTD	DNC
Points	10,000	7,800	6,085	4,745	3,320	1,330	265	265	265	0

Position	+/-	Surfer	(Hawaii) WCT 1	(Australia) WCT 2	(Australia) WCT 3	(Australia) WCT 4	(Australia) WCT 5	(United States) WCT 6	(Mexico) WCT 7	(United States) Finals	Points
1	Steady	Gabriel Medina (BRA)	2nd	2nd	1st	9th	1st	2nd	5th	1st	43,400
2	1	Filipe Toledo (BRA)	17th	3rd	9th	1st	17th	1st	17th	2nd	30,735
3	1	Italo Ferreira (BRA)	3rd	1st	9th	5th	3rd	9th	5th	3rd	31,660
4	Steady	Conner Coffin (USA)	33rd	5th	2nd	17th	5th	9th	5th	4th	25,355
5	Steady	Morgan Cibilic (AUS)	17th	3rd	5th	17th	2nd	9th	9th	5th	25,270
6	Steady	Griffin Colapinto (USA)	17th	9th	3rd	3rd	17th	3rd	17th		22,905
7	Steady	Jordy Smith (ZAF)	5th	9th	9th	2nd	9th	INJ	INJ		22,505
8	Steady	Kanoa Igarashi (JPN)	5th	9th	5th	9th	17th	3rd	17th		22,215
9	Steady	Yago Dora (BRA)	17th	9th	5th	17th	5th	5th	9th		20,875
10	Steady	Frederico Morais (PRT)	17th	9th	3rd	9th	17th	9th	5th		20,790
11	Steady	John John Florence (HAW)	1st	17th	9th	5th	INJ	INJ	INJ		19,660
12	Steady	Jack Robinson (AUS)	9th	17th	9th	17th	17th	33rd	1st		19,300
13	Steady	Leonardo Fioravanti (ITA)	5th	17th	33rd	17th	9th	9th	3rd		18,800
14	Steady	Deivid Silva (BRA)	17th	5th	17th	17th	17th	17th	2nd		16,535
15	Steady	Ryan Callinan (AUS)	9th	5th	17th	5th	17th	17th	17th		15,470
15	Steady	Adriano de Souza (BRA)	33rd	5th	17th	17th	9th	5th	17th		15,470
15	Steady	Ethan Ewing (AUS)	17th	17th	5th	17th	17th	5th	9th		15,470
18	Steady	Kelly Slater (USA)	3rd	INJ	INJ	INJ	INJ	5th	9th		14,680
19	Steady	Jadson André (BRA)	9th	33rd	9th	9th	33rd	17th	9th		14,610
20	Steady	Jérémy Florès (FRA)	5th	17th	17th	9th	33rd	WTD	9th		14,045
20	Steady	Julian Wilson (AUS)	17th	9th	17th	9th	5th	WTD	–		14,045
20	Steady	Seth Moniz (HAW)	17th	17th	17th	5th	9th	9th	17th		14,045
20	Steady	Miguel Pupo (BRA)	9th	17th	17th	17th	5th	9th	17th		14,045
24	Steady	Matthew McGillivray (ZAF)	9th	33rd	33rd	3rd	17th	17th	17th		13,395
25	Steady	Owen Wright (AUS)	INJ	9th	17th	17th	9th	9th	17th		12,620
25	Steady	Caio Ibelli (BRA)	9th	17th	9th	9th	17th	17th	17th		12,620
27	Steady	Peterson Crisanto (BRA)	9th	17th	17th	9th	33rd	17th	17th		10,630
28	Steady	Michel Bourez (FRA)	17th	17th	17th	17th	9th	INJ	17th		8,640
28	Steady	Jack Freestone (AUS)	9th	17th	17th	33rd	17th	17th	INJ		8,640
28	Steady	Wade Carmichael (AUS)	17th	9th	17th	17th	17th	17th	17th		8,640
28	Steady	Connor O'Leary (AUS)	17th	17th	33rd	17th	9th	17th	33rd		8,640
32	Steady	Mikey Wright (AUS)	17th	33rd	17th	33rd	9th	33rd	17th		7,575
33	Steady	Alex Ribeiro (BRA)	33rd	17th	17th	17th	17th	17th	33rd		6,650
34	Steady	Liam O'Brien (AUS)	–	–	–	–	3rd	33rd	–		6,350
35	Steady	Mateus Herdy (BRA)	–	–	–	–	–	–	3rd		6,085
36	Steady	Adrian Buchan (AUS)	INJ	17th	33rd	17th	INJ	17th	17th		5,585
37	Steady	Kolohe Andino (USA)	17th	INJ	INJ	INJ	INJ	INJ	9th		5,445
38	Steady	Reef Heazlewood (AUS)	–	–	9th	33rd	–	–	–		3,585
39	Steady	Rio Waida (IDN)	–	–	–	–	–	–	9th		3,320
40	Steady	Jacob Willcox (AUS)	–	–	–	17th	17th	–	–		2,660
41	Steady	Joshua Moniz (HAW)	17th	–	–	–	–	–	–		1,330
41	Steady	Sebastian Zietz (HAW)	17th	–	–	–	–	–	–		1,330
41	Steady	Crosby Colapinto (USA)	–	17th	–	–	–	–	–		1,330
41	Steady	Jackson Baker (AUS)	–	17th	–	–	–	–	–		1,330
41	Steady	Dylan Moffat (AUS)	–	–	17th	–	–	–	–		1,330
41	Steady	Mick Fanning (AUS)	–	–	17th	–	–	–	–		1,330
41	Steady	Stuart Kennedy (AUS)	–	–	–	–	17th	–	–		1,330
41	Steady	Kael Walsh (AUS)	–	–	–	–	17th	–	–		1,330
41	Steady	Nat Young (USA)	–	–	–	–	–	17th	–		1,330
41	Steady	Michael Dunphy (USA)	–	–	–	–	–	17th	–		1,330
41	Steady	Patrick Gudauskas (USA)	–	–	–	–	–	17th	–		1,330
41	Steady	Eli Hanneman (HAW)	–	–	–	–	–	17th	–		1,330
41	Steady	Lucas Vicente (BRA)	–	–	–	–	–	17th	–		1,330
41	Steady	Lucca Mesinas (PER)	–	–	–	–	–	–	17th		1,330
55	Steady	Miguel Tudela (PER)	33rd	–	–	–	–	–	–		265
55	Steady	Matt Banting (AUS)	–	33rd	–	–	–	–	–		265
55	Steady	Cyrus Cox (AUS)	–	–	–	33rd	–	–	–		265
55	Steady	Taj Burrow (AUS)	–	–	–	–	33rd	–	–		265
55	Steady	Jabe Swiercocki (USA)	–	–	–	–	–	33rd	–		265
55	Steady	Jhony Corzo (MEX)	–	–	–	–	–	–	33rd		265
55	Steady	Diego Cadena (MEX)	–	–	–	–	–	–	33rd		265

=== Women's standings ===
Points are awarded using the following structure:

Position	1st	2nd	3rd	5th	9th	17th	INJ	WTD	DNC
Points	10,000	7,800	6,085	4,745	2,610	1,045	1,045	1,045	0

Position	+/-	Surfer	(Hawaii) WCT 1	(Australia) WCT 2	(Australia) WCT 3	(Australia) WCT 4	(Australia) WCT 5	(United States) WCT 6	(Mexico) WCT 7	(United States) Finals	Points
1	Steady	Carissa Moore (HAW)	2nd	1st	3rd	3rd	3rd	2nd	3rd	1st	37,770
2	Steady	Tatiana Weston-Webb (BRA)	3rd	9th	2nd	1st	17th	3rd	5th	2nd	34,715
3	Steady	Sally Fitzgibbons (AUS)	3rd	9th	5th	5th	1st	3rd	3rd	3rd	33,000
4	1	Johanne Defay (FRA)	9th	5th	5th	5th	2nd	1st	5th	4th	32,035
5	1	Stephanie Gilmore (AUS)	5th	5th	5th	2nd	9th	5th	1st	5th	32,035
6	Steady	Caroline Marks (USA)	9th	3rd	1st	9th	9th	5th	9th		26,050
6	Steady	Tyler Wright (AUS)	1st	9th	9th	5th	3rd	WTD	9th		26,050
8	Steady	Isabella Nichols (AUS)	9th	2nd	17th	5th	5th	9th	5th		24,645
9	Steady	Courtney Conlogue (USA)	9th	5th	3rd	17th	9th	5th	5th		22,930
10	Steady	Malia Manuel (HAW)	5th	17th	9th	9th	5th	9th	2nd		22,510
11	Steady	Bronte Macaulay (AUS)	17th	5th	9th	3rd	9th	WTD	9th		18,660
11	Steady	Keely Andrew (AUS)	17th	3rd	5th	9th	9th	9th	9th		18,660
13	Steady	Nikki van Dijk (AUS)	9th	9th	9th	9th	5th	9th	INJ		15,185
13	Steady	Sage Erickson (USA)	5th	17th	9th	9th	9th	9th	9th		15,185
15	Steady	Brisa Hennessy (CRC)	9th	9th	9th	9th	17th	9th	9th		13,050
15	Steady	Macy Callaghan (AUS)	9th	9th	9th	9th	9th	WTD	9th		13,050
17	Steady	Amuro Tsuzuki (JPN)	–	–	9th	9th	5th	17th	–		11,010
18	Steady	Lakey Peterson (USA)	5th	9th	INJ	INJ	INJ	INJ	INJ		10,490
19	Steady	Coco Ho (HAW)	–	–	–	–	–	5th	–		4,745
20	Steady	Bettylou Sakura Johnson (HAW)	9th	–	–	–	–	–	–		2,610
20	Steady	Phillipa Anderson (AUS)	–	9th	–	–	–	–	–		2,610
20	Steady	Mia McCarthy (AUS)	–	–	–	–	9th	–	–		2,610
20	Steady	Kirra Pinkerton (USA)	–	–	–	–	–	9th	–		2,610
20	Steady	Alyssa Spencer (USA)	–	–	–	–	–	9th	–		2,610
20	Steady	Silvana Lima (BRA)	–	–	–	–	–	–	9th		2,610
26	Steady	Laura Enever (AUS)	–	–	17th	–	–	–	–		1,045
26	Steady	Willow Hardy (AUS)	–	–	–	17th	–	–	–		1,045
26	Steady	Caitlin Simmers (USA)	–	–	–	–	–	17th	–		1,045
26	Steady	Shelby Detmers (MEX)	–	–	–	–	–	–	17th		1,045
26	Steady	Regina Pioli (MEX)	–	–	–	–	–	–	17th		1,045

== Challenger Series ==
=== 2021 Men's Challenger Series ===
Round	Event	Men's champion	Men's runner-up
1	(United States) US Open of Surfing Huntington Beach	(United States) Griffin Colapinto	(United States) Jake Marshall
2	(Portugal) MEO Vissla Pro Ericeira	(Hawaii) Ezekiel Lau	(Australia) Jackson Baker
3	Quiksilver Pro France	(Australia) Connor O'Leary	(France) Michel Bourez
4	(Hawaii) Michelob ULTRA Pure Gold Haleiwa Challenger	(Hawaii) John John Florence	(Australia) Jack Robinson

Position	1st	2nd	3rd	4th	5th	7th	9th	13th	17th	25th	37th	49th	73rd
Points	10,000	8,000	6,500	6,100	5,000	4,900	3,500	3,400	2,000	750	650	400	350

Ranking	+/-	Surfer	Events					Points
Ranking	+/-	Surfer	Carry Over	(United States) 1	(Portugal) 2	(France) 3	(Hawaii) 4	Points
1	Steady	Kanoa Igarashi (JPN)	–	3rd	~~25th~~	3rd	3rd	19,500
2	Steady	Ezekiel Lau (HAW)	–	9th	1st	~~49th~~	5th	18,600
3	Steady	Liam O'Brien (AUS)	5.000	5th	~~25th~~	~~25th~~	7th	14,900
4	Steady	Connor O'Leary (AUS)	–	~~73rd~~	37th	1st	9th	14,250
5	Steady	Griffin Colapinto (USA)	750	1st	–	–	13th	14,150
6	Steady	Jake Marshall (USA)	2.500	2nd	~~17th~~	~~25th~~	9th	14,100
7	Steady	Jack Robinson (AUS)	5.000	25th	–	–	2nd	13,750
8	Steady	Callum Robson (AUS)	–	5th	9th	~~17th~~	7th	13,400
9	Steady	Samuel Pupo (BRA)	–	~~73rd~~	9th	9th	4th	13,100
10	Steady	Nat Young (USA)	5.000	~~49th~~	3rd	~~49th~~	49th	12,100
11	Steady	Imaikalani deVault (HAW)	3.500	17th	3rd	~~37th~~	~~49th~~	12,000
12	Steady	Lucca Mesinas (PER)	2.500	~~17th~~	9th	5th	~~33rd~~	11,000
12	Steady	João Chianca (BRA)	4.000	~~25th~~	9th	9th	~~25th~~	11,000
14	Steady	Jackson Baker (AUS)	2.000	~~73rd~~	2nd	~~49th~~	33rd	10,700
15	Steady	Carlos Munoz (CRC)	–	37th	5th	5th	~~49th~~	10,650
16	Steady	Jordan Lawler (AUS)	–	~~25th~~	5th	9th	25th	10,300
17	Steady	John John Florence (HAW)	–	–	–	–	1st	10,000
17	Steady	Leonardo Fioravanti (ITA)	10.000	–	–	–	–	10,000
19	Steady	Michel Bourez (FRA)	–	37th	~~73rd~~	2nd	49th	9,250
19	Steady	Mateus Herdy (BRA)	750	~~49th~~	17th	3rd	~~49th~~	9,250
19	Steady	Lucas Silveira (BRA)	750	5th	~~49th~~	9th	~~33rd~~	9,250

Legend Note: The top 12, non-CT men from the 2021 Challengers Series qualified for the 2022 Championship Tour.

Men's CT 2022

=== 2021 Women's Challengers Series ===
Round	Event	Women's champion	Women's runner-up
1	(United States) US Open of Surfing Huntington Beach	(United States) Caitlin Simmers	(Hawaii) Gabriela Bryan
2	(Portugal) MEO Vissla Pro Ericeira	(Brazil) Luana Silva	(Hawaii) Gabriela Bryan
3	Roxy Pro France	(Costa Rica) Brisa Hennessy	(Australia) India Robinson
4	(Hawaii) Michelob ULTRA Pure Gold Haleiwa Challenger	(Hawaii) Bettylou Sakura Johnson	(Hawaii) Gabriela Bryan

Position	1st	2nd	3rd	4th	5th	7th	9th	13th	17th	25th	33th	49th
Points	10,000	8,000	6,500	6,100	5,000	4,900	3,500	3,400	2,000	1,800	700	600

Ranking	+/-	Surfer	Events					Points
Ranking	+/-	Surfer	Carry Over	(United States) 1	(Portugal) 2	(France) 3	(Hawaii) 4	Points
1	Steady	Gabriela Bryan (HAW)	–	2nd	2nd	~~33rd~~	2nd	24,000
2	Steady	Brisa Hennessy (CRC)	6.500	~~25th~~	5th	1st	~~9th~~	21,500
3	Steady	Bettylou Sakura Johnson (HAW)	–	5th	5th	~~49th~~	1st	20,000
4	Steady	Caitlin Simmers (USA)	–	1st	~~33rd~~	3rd	17th	18,700
5	Steady	India Robinson (AUS)	–	~~25th~~	9th	2nd	4th	17,600
6	Steady	Carissa Moore (HAW)	10.000	–	–	–	3rd	16,500
7	Steady	Luana Silva (BRA) **	1.500	~~49th~~	1st	~~33rd~~	13th	14,900
8	Steady	Molly Picklum (AUS) **	5.000	~~33rd~~	~~17th~~	5th	7th	14,900
9	Steady	Vahine Fierro (FRA)	4.000	~~9th~~	~~17th~~	5th	7th	13,900
10	Steady	Alyssa Spencer (USA)	3.500	~~9th~~	~~9th~~	5th	5th	13,600
11	Steady	Sawyer Lindblad (USA)	–	5th	~~49th~~	3rd	25th	13,300

Legend Note: The top 6, non-CT women from the 2021 Challengers Series qualified for the 2022 Championship Tour.

- Luana Silva wins the tiebreaker (best two event results) over Molly Picklum for the sixth and final CT qualification spot.

Women's CT 2022
