= 2022 World Surf League =

Professional surfing league season

- Location: Hawaii, Portugal, Australia, Indonesia, El Salvador, Brazil, South Africa, French Polynesia, United States
- Dates: January 29th 2022 – September 16th 2022

Champions
- Men: (Brazil) Filipe Toledo
- Women: (Australia) Stephanie Gilmore

The 2022 World Surf League was the 45th season of all iterations of the tour circuit for professional surfers. Billabong Pipe Masters will be the first round of the tour.

For the second time, the season will end at Lower Trestles, in San Clemente, USA, with the top five seeded men and women from the season going head to head to determine the champion at the WSL Finals.

Gabriel Medina and Carissa Moore were the defending champions.

== Qualifier athletes ==
The first five events of the 2022 Championship Tour will be contested by the WSL top 36 men and top 18 women.

The top 36 men consist of:

- The Top 20 finishers from the 2021 Championship Tour rankings
- The Top 12 finishers on the 2021 Challenger Series rankings
- Two WSL season wildcards
- Two event wildcards

The top 18 women consist of:

- The Top 9 finishers on the 2021 Championship Tour rankings
- The Top 6 finishers on the 2021 Challenger Series rankings
- Two WSL season wildcards
- One event wildcard

With new venues and a revamped Tour structure, the 2022 CT season will start with 36 men and 18 women. Halfway through the season, the field will be reduced to 24 men and 12 women. The top-ranked surfers will automatically requalify for the 2023 CT as well as continue on to the second half of the Tour, where they will be joined by two men's wildcards and two women's wildcards (one season wildcard and one event wildcard).

=== Women's 2022 Championship Tour qualifiers ===
Top 9 Qualifiers from 2021 Championship Tour Rankings

- Carissa Moore (HAW)
- Tatiana Weston-Webb (BRA)
- Sally Fitzgibbons (AUS)
- Johanne Defay (FRA)
- Stephanie Gilmore (AUS)
- Caroline Marks (USA)
- Tyler Wright (AUS)
- Isabella Nichols (AUS)
- Courtney Conlogue (USA)

Top 6 Qualifiers from 2021 Challenger Series Rankings

- Gabriela Bryan (HAW)
- Brisa Hennessy (CRI)
- Bettylou Sakura Johnson (HAW)
- India Robinson (AUS)
- Luana Silva (HAW)
- ~~Caitlin Simmers (USA)~~ *
- Molly Picklum (AUS)

WSL Season Wildcards

- Lakey Peterson (USA)
- Malia Manuel (HAW)

WSL Replacement

- Bronte Macaulay (AUS)

Substitution

- Caitlin Simmers turned down her spot on the Championship Tour to focus on her personal development. Molly Picklum replaced Simmers as she was next in the CS 2021 Ranking.

=== Men's 2022 Championship Tour qualifiers ===
Top 20 Qualifiers from 2021 Championship Tour Rankings

- Gabriel Medina (BRA)
- Filipe Toledo (BRA)
- Italo Ferreira (BRA)
- Conner Coffin (USA)
- Morgan Cibilic (AUS)
- Griffin Colapinto (USA)
- Jordy Smith (ZAF)
- Kanoa Igarashi (JPN)
- Yago Dora (BRA)
- Frederico Morais (PRT)
- John John Florence (HAW)
- Jack Robinson (AUS)
- Leonardo Fioravanti (ITA)
- Deivid Silva (BRA)
- Ryan Callinan (AUS)
- Ethan Ewing (AUS)
- Kelly Slater (USA)
- Jadson Andre (BRA)
- Miguel Pupo (BRA)
- Seth Moniz (HAW)

Top 12 Qualifiers from 2021 Challenger Series Rankings

- Ezekiel Lau (HAW)
- Liam O'Brien (AUS)*
- Connor O'Leary (AUS)
- Jake Marshall (USA)
- Callum Robson (AUS)
- Samuel Pupo (BRA)
- Nat Young (USA)
- Imaikalani Devault (HAW)
- Lucca Mesinas (PER)
- Joao Chianca (BRA)
- Jackson Baker (AUS)
- Carlos Munoz (CRI)*

WSL Season Wildcards

- Kolohe Andino (USA)
- Owen Wright (AUS)

WSL Replacement

- Matthew McGillivray (ZAF)

Substitution

- Liam O'Brien and Carlos Munoz did not compete in CT 2022 because of injuries in the first half of the season. They were replaced by Barron Mamiya and Caio Ibelli as regular athletes of the season.

== Schedule ==
The championship series will consist of the following events, subject to change due to the COVID-19 pandemic.

Round	Date	Event	Location
1	January 29 – February 10	(Hawaii) Billabong Pro Pipeline	Banzai Pipeline, Oahu, Hawaii
2	February 11–23	(Hawaii) Hurley Pro Sunset Beach	Sunset Beach, Oahu, Hawaii
3	March 3–13	MEO Portugal Pro	Supertubos, Peniche, Portugal
4	April 10–20	(Australia) Rip Curl Pro Bells Beach	Bells Beach, Victoria, Australia
5	April 24 – May 4	(Australia) Margaret River Pro	Margaret River, Western Australia, Australia
6	May 28 – June 6	(Indonesia) Quiksilver/ROXY Pro G-Land	G-Land, Banyuwangi, Indonesia
7	June 12–20	Surf City El Salvador Pro	Punta Roca, La Libertad, El Salvador
8	June 23–30	(Brazil) Oi Rio Pro	Saquarema, Rio de Janeiro, Brazil
9	July 12–21	(South Africa) Corona Open J-Bay	Jeffreys Bay, Eastern Cape, South Africa
10	August 11–21	(French Polynesia) Outerknown Tahiti Pro	Teahupo'o, Tahiti, French Polynesia
11	September 8–16	(United States) Rip Curl WSL Finals	San Clemente, California, United States

== Results and standings ==
=== Event results ===
Round	Event	Men's champion	Men's runner-up	Women's champion	Women's runner-up
1	(Hawaii) Billabong Pro Pipeline	(United States) Kelly Slater	(Hawaii) Seth Moniz	(Hawaii) Moana Jones Wong	(Hawaii) Carissa Moore
2	(Hawaii) Hurley Pro Sunset Beach	(Hawaii) Barron Mamiya	(Japan) Kanoa Igarashi	(Costa Rica) Brisa Hennessy	(Hawaii) Malia Manuel
3	MEO Portugal Pro	(United States) Griffin Colapinto	(Brazil) Filipe Toledo	(Brazil) Tatiana Weston-Webb	(United States) Lakey Peterson
4	(Australia) Rip Curl Pro Bells Beach	(Brazil) Filipe Toledo	(Australia) Callum Robson	(Australia) Tyler Wright	(Hawaii) Carissa Moore
5	(Australia) Margaret River Pro	(Australia) Jack Robinson	(Hawaii) John John Florence	(Australia) Isabella Nichols	(Hawaii) Gabriela Bryan
6	(Indonesia) Quiksilver/ROXY Pro G-Land	(Australia) Jack Robinson	(Brazil) Filipe Toledo	(France) Johanne Defay	(Hawaii) Carissa Moore
7	Surf City El Salvador Pro	(United States) Griffin Colapinto	(Brazil) Filipe Toledo	(Australia) Stephanie Gilmore	(United States) Lakey Peterson
8	(Brazil) Oi Rio Pro	(Brazil) Filipe Toledo	(Brazil) Samuel Pupo	(Hawaii) Carissa Moore	(France) Johanne Defay
9	(South Africa) Corona Open J-Bay	(Australia) Ethan Ewing	(Australia) Jack Robinson	(Brazil) Tatiana Weston-Webb	(Australia) Tyler Wright
10	(French Polynesia) Outerknown Tahiti Pro	(Brazil) Miguel Pupo	(France) Kauli Vaast	(United States) Courtney Conlogue	(Costa Rica) Brisa Hennessy
11	(United States) Rip Curl WSL Finals	(Brazil) Filipe Toledo	(Brazil) Ítalo Ferreira	(Australia) Stephanie Gilmore	(Hawaii) Carissa Moore

=== Men's standings ===
Points are awarded using the following structure:

Position	1st	2nd	3rd	5th	9th	17th	33rd	INJ	WTD	DNC
Points	10,000	7,800	6,085	4,745	3,320	1,330	265	265	265	0

Position	+/-	Surfer	(Hawaii) WCT 1	(Hawaii) WCT 2	(Portugal) WCT 3	(Australia) WCT 4	(Australia) WCT 5	(Indonesia) WCT 6	(El Salvador) WCT 7	(Brazil) WCT 8	(South Africa) WCT 9	(French Polynesia) WCT 10	(United States) Finals	Points
1	Steady	Filipe Toledo (BRA)	9th	9th	2nd	1st	~~9th~~	2nd	2nd	1st	9th	17th	1st	54,690
2	2	Ítalo Ferreira (BRA)	9th	~~17th~~	3rd	5th	5th	9th	3rd	3rd	5th	17th	2nd	40,460
3	1	Jack Robinson (AUS)	17th	5th	~~17th~~	3rd	1st	1st	5th	9th	2nd	9th	3rd	51,345
4	1	Ethan Ewing (AUS)	17th	3rd	~~17th~~	3rd	3rd	9th	5th	9th	1st	9th	4th	44,290
5	Steady	Kanoa Igarashi (JAP)	5th	2nd	5th	17th	~~17th~~	5th	5th	17th	3rd	5th	5th	40,270
6	Steady	Miguel Pupo (BRA)	3rd	~~33rd~~	9th	5th	9th	9th	17th	5th	9th	1st		40,185
7	Steady	Griffin Colapinto (USA)	17th	17th	1st	~~17th~~	5th	5th	1st	17th	9th	9th		40,120
8	Steady	Caio Ibelli (BRA)	3rd	3rd	17th	~~17th~~	9th	17th	9th	9th	9th	3rd		34,195
9	Steady	Connor O'Leary (AUS)	17th	9th	9th	9th	~~17th~~	3rd	9th	5th	5th	9th		33,505
10	Steady	Callum Robson (AUS)	9th	~~17th~~	9th	2nd	9th	17th	5th	5th	9th	17th		33,230
10	Steady	Samuel Pupo (BRA)	5th	17th	~~17th~~	9th	9th	9th	17th	2nd	5th	9th		33,230
12	Steady	John John Florence (HAW)	5th	~~17th~~	3rd	5th	2nd	9th	INJ	INJ	INJ	INJ		32,015
13	Steady	Matthew McGillivray (RSA)	17th	9th	33rd	~~33rd~~	3rd	5th	9th	9th	9th	5th		30,450
14	Steady	Jordy Smith (RSA)	9th	9th	5th	~~17th~~	5th	17th	9th	17th	5th	9th		30,175
15	Steady	Kelly Slater (USA)	1st	17th	9th	17th	~~17th~~	17th	INJ	INJ	9th	3rd		29,375
16	Steady	Barron Mamiya (HAW)	9th	1st	17th	~~17th~~	9th	17th	9th	INJ	17th	17th		26,610
17	Steady	Nat Young (USA)	~~17th~~	9th	9th	9th	5th	17th	17th	9th	9th	17th		25,355
18	Steady	Jake Marshall (USA)	17th	5th	9th	17th	~~17th~~	9th	9th	17th	17th	9th		23,345
19	Steady	Yago Dora (BRA)	INJ	INJ	INJ	INJ	~~INJ~~	17th	9th	3rd	3rd	5th		22,625
20	Steady	Kolohe Andino (USA)	~~17th~~	9th	5th	9th	9th	9th	17th	17th	17th	INJ		22,015
21	Steady	Jadson André (BRA)	~~33rd~~	9th	17th	17th	9th	5th	17th	17th	17th	9th		21,355
22	Steady	Seth Moniz (HAW)	2nd	5th	17th	33rd	~~33rd~~	INJ	INJ	INJ	17th	17th		20,790
23	Steady	Jackson Baker (AUS)	17th	17th	9th	9th	~~17th~~	17th	9th	9th	17th	17th		19,930
24	Steady	Gabriel Medina (BRA)	INJ	INJ	INJ	INJ	~~INJ~~	3rd	3rd	17th	INJ	INJ		17,220
Cut after mid-season
25	Steady	Conner Coffin (USA)	17th	17th	5th	~~33rd~~	17th	–	–	–	–	–	–	8,735
25	Steady	Ezekiel Lau (HAW)	17th	5th	17th	17th	~~17th~~	–	–	–	–	–	–	8,735
25	Steady	Lucca Mesinas (PER)	5th	17th	17th	17th	~~17th~~	–	–	–	–	–	–	8,735
25	Steady	Owen Wright (AUS)	17th	~~33rd~~	17th	5th	17th	–	–	–	–	–	–	8,735
29	Steady	João Chianca (BRA)	9th	17th	17th	17th	~~17th~~	–	–	17th	–	–	–	8,640
30	Steady	Deivid Silva (BRA)	17th	9th	~~33rd~~	17th	17th	–	–	–	–	–	–	7,310
30	Steady	Frederico Morais (POR)	17th	17th	9th	17th	~~17th~~	–	–	–	–	–	–	7,310
30	Steady	Imaikalani deVault (HAW)	~~33rd~~	17th	17th	9th	17th	–	–	–	–	–	–	7,310
30	Steady	Leonardo Fioravanti (ITA)	9th	17th	17th	17th	~~17th~~	–	–	–	–	–	–	7,310
30	Steady	Morgan Cibilic (AUS)	~~33rd~~	17th	17th	9th	17th	–	–	–	–	–	–	7,310
35	Steady	Carlos Munoz (CRI)	9th	INJ	INJ	INJ	~~INJ~~	–	17th	–	–	–	–	5,445
36	Steady	Ryan Callinan (AUS)	~~INJ~~	17th	17th	17th	17th	–	–	–	–	–	–	5,320
37	Steady	Matheus Herdy (BRA)	–	–	–	–	–	–	–	5th	–	–	–	4,745
38	Steady	Miguel Tudela (PER)	17th	–	–	–	–	–	–	9th	–	–	–	4,650
39	Steady	Michael Rodrigues (BRA)	–	–	–	–	–	–	–	9th	–	–	–	3,320
39	Steady	Rio Waida (IDN)	–	–	–	–	–	9th	–	–	–	–	–	3,320
39	Steady	Mick Fanning (AUS)	–	–	–	9th	–	–	–	–	–	–	–	3,320
42	Steady	Bryan Perez (ESA)	–	–	–	–	–	17th	17th	–	–	–	–	2,660
42	Steady	Josh Burke (BAR)	–	–	–	–	–	17th	17th	–	–	–	–	2,660
44	7	Josh Faulkner (RSA)	–	–	–	–	–	–	–	–	17th	–	–	1,330
44	7	Luke Thompson (RSA)	–	–	–	–	–	–	–	–	17th	–	–	1,330
44	Steady	Mickey Wright (AUS)	–	–	–	17th	–	–	–	–	–	–	–	1,330
44	Steady	Justin Becret (FRA)	–	–	17th	–	–	–	–	–	–	–	–	1,330
44	Steady	Billy Kemper (HAW)	–	17th	–	–	–	–	–	–	–	–	–	1,330
44	Steady	Ivan Florence (HAW)	17th	–	–	–	–	–	–	–	–	–	–	1,330
50	2	Liam O'Brien (AUS)	INJ	INJ	INJ	INJ	~~INJ~~	–	–	–	–	–	–	1,060
51	2	Jordan Lawler (AUS)	33rd	33rd	–	–	–	–	–	–	–	–	–	530
52	2	Ben Spence (AUS)	–	–	–	–	33rd	–	–	–	–	–	–	265
52	2	Jack Thomas (AUS)	–	–	–	–	33rd	–	–	–	–	–	–	265
52	2	Jacob Willcox (AUS)	–	–	–	–	33rd	–	–	–	–	–	–	265
52	2	Afonso Antunes (POR)	–	–	33rd	–	–	–	–	–	–	–	–	265
52	2	Vasco Ribeiro (POR)	–	–	33rd	–	–	–	–	–	–	–	–	265
52	2	Koa Smith (HAW)	–	33rd	–	–	–	–	–	–	–	–	–	265

- Event Wild Card Surfers do not receive points for the WSL. Their results on each event are indicated on the above table but no ranking points are awarded.

Gabriel Medina and Yago Dora received the 2022/23 WC, due to injuries at the beginning of the 2022 season, their points for the remainder of the season will count.

=== Women's standings ===
Points are awarded using the following structure:

Position	1st	2nd	3rd	5th	9th	17th	INJ	WTD	DNC
Points	10,000	7,800	6,085	4,745	2,610	1,045	1,045	1,045	0

Position	+/-	Surfer	(Hawaii) WCT 1	(Hawaii) WCT 2	(Portugal) WCT 3	(Australia) WCT 4	(Australia) WCT 5	(Indonesia) WCT 6	(El Salvador) WCT 7	(Brazil) WCT 8	(South Africa) WCT 9	(French Polynesia) WCT 10	(United States) Finals	Points
1	4	Stephanie Gilmore (AUS)	WTD	9th	3rd	5th	5th	5th	1st	9th	3rd	5th	1st	46,370
2	1	Carissa Moore (HAW)	2nd	9th	3rd	2nd	~~9th~~	2nd	5th	1st	3rd	5th	2nd	57,670
3	1	Johanne Defay (FRA)	5th	5th	5th	5th	~~5th~~	1st	3rd	2nd	5th	9th	3rd	50,220
4	1	Tatiana Weston-Webb (BRA)	9th	9th	1st	9th	~~9th~~	3rd	9th	3rd	1st	3rd	4th	48,695
5	1	Brisa Hennessy (CRI)	5th	1st	~~9th~~	3rd	5th	5th	9th	9th	5th	2nd	5th	48,085
6	Steady	Lakey Peterson (USA)	3rd	9th	2nd	9th	~~9th~~	5th	2nd	5th	9th	5th		43,750
7	Steady	Courtney Conlogue (USA)	~~17th~~	9th	5th	3rd	3rd	9th	5th	9th	9th	1st		42,100
8	Steady	Tyler Wright (AUS)	3rd	9th	5th	1st	9th	9th	INJ	INJ	2nd	9th		39,070
9	Steady	Gabriela Bryan (HAW)	9th	3rd	9th	~~9th~~	2nd	9th	9th	3rd	5th	9th		37,765
10	Steady	Isabella Nichols (AUS)	5th	9th	9th	~~9th~~	1st	9th	5th	5th	9th	9th		37,285
11	Steady	Caroline Marks (USA)	17th	INJ	INJ	INJ	~~INJ~~	~~INJ~~	3rd	5th	5th	5th		27,110
12	Steady	Sally Fitzgibbons (AUS)	9th	9th	9th	5th	~~9th~~	5th*	5th*	5th*	INJ	INJ		26,810
Cut after mid-season
13	Steady	Malia Manuel (HAW)	5th	2nd	9th	9th	~~9th~~	–	–	–	–	–	–	17,765
14	Steady	India Robinson (AUS)	9th	5th	5th	9th	~~9th~~	–	–	–	–	–	–	14,710
14	Steady	Molly Picklum (AUS)	9th	5th	9th	~~17th~~	5th	–	–	–	–	–	–	14,710
16	Steady	Bronte Macaulay (AUS)	–	17th	9th	5th	3rd	~~3rd~~	–	–	–	–	–	14,485
17	Steady	Luana Silva (BRA)	9th	5th	9th	9th	~~9th~~	–	–	–	–	–	–	12,575
18	Steady	Moana Jones Wong (HAW)	1st	17th	–	–	–	–	–	–	–	–	–	11,045
19	Steady	Bettylou Sakura Johnson (HAW)	9th	3rd	17th	17th	~~17th~~	–	–	–	–	–	–	10,785
20	Steady	Alyssa Spencer (USA)	–	–	–	9th	–	–	–	–	–	–	–	2,610
20	Steady	Bethany Hamilton (HAW)	9th	–	–	–	–	–	–	–	–	–	–	2,610
22	Steady	Tia Blanco (USA)	–	–	17th	–	–	–	~~9th~~	–	~~9th~~	–	–	1,045
22	Steady	Mia McCarthy (AUS)	–	–	–	–	17th	–	–	–	–	–	–	1,045
WC	Steady	Vahine Fierro (FRA)	–	–	–	–	–	–	–	–	–	~~3rd~~	–	0
WC	Steady	Sol Aguirre (PER)	–	–	–	–	–	–	–	~~9th~~	–	–	–	0

- Event Wild Card Surfers do not receive points for the WSL. Their results on each event are indicated on the above table but no ranking points are awarded.

Caroline Marks and Sally Fitzgibbons received the 2022/23 WC, due to injuries at the beginning of the 2022 season, their points for the remainder of the season will count.

== Challenger Series ==
=== 2022 Men's Challenger Series ===
Round	Event	Men's champion	Men's runner-up
1	(Australia) Boost Mobile Gold Coast Pro	(Australia) Callum Robson	(Australia) Sheldon Simkus
2	(Australia) GWM Sydney Surf Pro	(Indonesia) Rio Waida	(Australia) Ryan Callinan
3	(South Africa) Ballito Pro	(Indonesia) Rio Waida	(France) Gatien Delahaye
4	(United States) VANS US Open of Surfing	(Hawaii) Ezekiel Lau	(Brazil) João Chianca
5	(Portugal) EDP Vissla Pro Ericeira	(Italy) Leonardo Fioravanti	(Australia) Ryan Callinan
6	(Brazil) Corona Saquarema Pro	(Brazil) Gabriel Medina	(Morocco) Ramzi Boukhiam
7	(Hawaii) Haleiwa Challenger, at Home in The Hawaiian Islands	(Hawaii) John John Florence	(Japan) Kanoa Igarashi

Position	1st	2nd	3rd	4th	5th	7th	9th	13th	17th	25th	37th	49th	73rd
Points	10,000	7,800	6,085	5,685	4,745	4,545	3,320	3,120	1,900	750	650	400	350

Ranking	+/-	Surfer	Events							Points
Ranking	+/-	Surfer	(Australia) 1	(Australia) 2	(South Africa) 3	(United States) 4	(Portugal) 5	(Brazil) 6	(Hawaii) 7	Points
1	Steady	Leonardo Fioravanti (ITA)	5th	3rd	3rd	~~25th~~	1st	~~5th~~	~~5th~~	26,915
2	Steady	Ryan Callinan (AUS)	~~73rd~~	2nd	~~37th~~	5th	2nd	–	4th	26,030
3	Steady	Rio Waida (INA)	25th	1st	1st	~~49th~~	17th	~~25th~~	~~33rd~~	22,650
4	Steady	Maxime Huscenot (FRA)	3rd	~~17th~~	~~25th~~	~~49th~~	9th	5th	7th	18,695
5	Steady	Ramzi Boukhiam (MAR)	5th	17th	~~49th~~	9th	~~73rd~~	2nd	~~49th~~	17,765
6	Steady	Michael Rodrigues (BRA)	~~17th~~	9th	9th	–	5th	~~25th~~	3rd	17,470
6	Steady	Ian Gentil (HAW)	9th	~~37th~~	~~73rd~~	9th	3rd	5th	~~49th~~	17,470
8	Steady	João Chianca (BRA)	~~37th~~	~~49th~~	37th	2nd	~~49th~~	3rd	25th	16,235
9	Steady	Liam O'Brien (AUS)	~~73rd~~	~~25th~~	9th	5th	3rd	~~17th~~	17th	16,050
10	Steady	Ezekiel Lau (HAW)	9th	~~25th~~	25th	1st	~~37th~~	~~25th~~	25th	15,770
CT Qualification Line
11	Steady	Dylan Moffat (AUS)	5th	9th	17th	~~49th~~	5th	~~17th~~	~~49th~~	14,710
12	Steady	Morgan Cibilic (AUS)	9th	9th	~~37th~~	~~37th~~	5th	9th	13th	14,705
13	Steady	Jacob Willcox (AUS)	~~49th~~	~~49th~~	5th	17th	5th	~~49th~~	25th	13,090
14	Steady	Gatien Delahaye (FRA)	~~73rd~~	~~73rd~~	2nd	25th	~~49th~~	37th	13th	12,320
15	Steady	Imaikalani deVault (HAW)	~~25th~~	5th	~~25th~~	9th	25th	~~73rd~~	9th	12,135
16	Steady	Eithan Osborne (USA)	–	–	9th	3rd	17th	~~37th~~	33rd	12,005
17	Steady	Lucca Mesinas (PER)	~~25th~~	~~49th~~	17th	5th	17th	9th	~~49th~~	11,865
18	Steady	Joan Duru (FRA)	–	~~25th~~	25th	25th	9th	3rd	~~49th~~	10,905
19	Steady	Alejo Muniz (BRA)	~~37th~~	17th	5th	9th	~~37th~~	~~73rd~~	33rd	10,665
20	Steady	Kanoa Igarashi (JPN)	–	–	–	25th	17th	–	2nd	10,450
21	Steady	Edgard Groggia (BRA)	~~73rd~~	17th	~~49th~~	9th	9th	17th	~~33rd~~	10,440
22	Steady	Mateus Herdy (BRA)	~~25th~~	17th	5th	17th	~~49th~~	~~73rd~~	25th	10,245
23	Steady	John John Florence (HAW)	–	–	–	–	–	–	1st	10,000
23	Steady	Callum Robson (AUS)	1st	–	–	–	–	–	–	10,000
23	Steady	Gabriel Medina (BRA)	–	–	–	–	–	1st	–	10,000

Legend

- Note: The top 10 men qualified for the 2023 Championship Tour.

Men's CT 2023

=== 2022 Women's Challengers Series ===
Round	Event	Women's champion	Women's runner-up
1	(Australia) Boost Mobile Gold Coast Pro	(United States) Caitlin Simmers	(Australia) Molly Picklum
2	(Australia) GWM Sydney Surf Pro	(Portugal) Teresa Bonvalot	(Australia) Nikki Van Dijk
3	(South Africa) Ballito Pro	(Australia) Molly Picklum	(Australia) Macy Callaghan
4	(United States) VANS US Open of Surfing	(Hawaii) Bettylou Sakura Johnson	(Australia) Macy Callaghan
5	(Portugal) EDP Vissla Pro Ericeira	(Australia) Macy Callaghan	(United States) Caitlin Simmers
6	(Brazil) Corona Saquarema Pro	(United States) Alyssa Spencer	(France) Tessa Thyssen
7	(Hawaii) Haleiwa Challenger, at Home in The Hawaiian Islands	(Australia) Sophie McCulloch	(Hawaii) Bettylou Sakura Johnson

Position	1st	2nd	3rd	4th	5th	7th	9th	13th	17th	25th	33rd	49th
Points	10,000	7,800	6,085	5,685	4,745	4,545	3,320	3,120	1,900	1,700	700	600

Ranking	+/-	Surfer	Events							Points
Ranking	+/-	Surfer	(Australia) 1	(Australia) 2	(South Africa) 3	(United States) 4	(Portugal) 5	(Brazil) 6	(Hawaii) 7	Points
1	Steady	Bettylou Sakura Johnson (HAW)	3rd	~~33rd~~	~~5th~~	1st	3rd	~~9th~~	2nd	29,970
2	Steady	Macy Callaghan (AUS)	~~9th~~	9th	2nd	2nd	1st	–	~~13th~~	28,920
3	Steady	Molly Picklum (AUS)	2nd	~~17th~~	1st	5th	3rd	~~33rd~~	~~7th~~	28,630
3	Steady	Caitlin Simmers (USA)	1st	~~5th~~	3rd	5th	2nd	–	~~25th~~	28,630
5	Steady	Sophie McCulloch (AUS) **	~~17th~~	3rd	~~9th~~	3rd	9th	~~33rd~~	1st	25,490
CT Qualification Line
6	Steady	Teresa Bonvalot (POR) **	~~17th~~	1st	9th	~~33rd~~	~~9th~~	3rd	3rd	25,490
7	Steady	Alyssa Spencer (USA)	~~33rd~~	5th	5th	~~49th~~	~~17th~~	1st	9th	22,810
8	Steady	Bronte Macaulay (AUS)	5th	~~33rd~~	3rd	5th	~~25th~~	5th	–	20,320
9	Steady	Nikki Van Dijk (AUS)	5th	2nd	9th	~~33rd~~	9th	–	–	19,185
10	Steady	Vahine Fierro (FRA)	~~25th~~	~~17th~~	9th	9th	5th	5th	~~17th~~	16,130
10	Steady	Sarah Baum (RSA)	~~25th~~	5th	~~25th~~	~~49th~~	5th	9th	9th	16,130

Legend Note: The top 5 qualified for the 2023 Championship Tour.

- 2. Sophie McCulloch won the tiebreak over Teresa Bonvalot based on heat wins to earn the final spot on the 2023 Championship Tour.

Women's CT 2023
