= 2022 World Surf League Finals =

- Venue: Lower Trestles
- Location: San Clemente, California, United States
- Dates: September 8, 2022
- Competitors: 10 from 6 nations

Champions
- Men: (Brazil) Filipe Toledo (1)
- Women: (Australia) Stephanie Gilmore (8)

The 2022 Rip Curl WSL Finals was the 11th and final event of the 2022 World Surf League. It was the second edition of the World Surf League Finals, and took place at Lower Trestles in California on September 8, 2022.

The men's event was won by Brazil's Filipe Toledo, while the women's event was won by Australia's Stephanie Gilmore.

== Format ==
The event featured the top five surfers from both the men's and women's regular season standings, and consisted of four head-to-head matches, held on a single day. In the first match, the surfers ranked fourth and fifth went head-to-head, with the winner advancing to take on the third-ranked surfer in the second match. The winner of the second match then took on the second-ranked surfer in the third match, with the winner qualifying for the title match against the top-ranked surfer in the standings.

== Results ==
=== Men ===
==== Draw ====
Match 1
4	(Brazil) Ítalo Ferreira	13.37
5	(Japan) Kanoa Igarashi	11.83

Match 2
3	(Australia) Ethan Ewing	11.83
4	(Brazil) Ítalo Ferreira	13.10

Match 3
2	(Australia) Jack Robinson	13.30
4	(Brazil) Ítalo Ferreira	16.10

Title match
1	(Brazil) Filipe Toledo	2
4	(Brazil) Ítalo Ferreira	0

==== Title match ====
(Brazil) Filipe Toledo	Round	(Brazil) Ítalo Ferreira
15.13	1	14.97
16.50	2	14.93
—	3	—

=== Women ===
==== Draw ====
Match 1
4	(Costa Rica) Brisa Hennessy	14.33
5	(Australia) Stephanie Gilmore	14.76

Match 2
3	(Brazil) Tatiana Weston-Webb	14.87
5	(Australia) Stephanie Gilmore	15.30

Match 3
2	(France) Johanne Defay	10.53
5	(Australia) Stephanie Gilmore	16.83

Title match
1	(Hawaii) Carissa Moore	0
5	(Australia) Stephanie Gilmore	2

==== Title match ====
(Hawaii) Carissa Moore	Round	(Australia) Stephanie Gilmore
10.90	1	15.00
11.97	2	15.23
—	3	—
