= João Chianca =

Brazilian surfer

Personal information
- Born: João Vítor de Azeredo Chianca; August 30, 2000 (age 25) Saquarema, Rio de Janeiro, Brazil
- Height: 5 ft 11 in (180 cm)

Surfing career
- Sport: Surfing
- Best year: 2023 - Ranked #4 WSL CT World Tour
- Sponsors: Volcom
- Major achievements: WSL Championship Tour event wins: 1

Surfing specifications
- Stance: Regular (natural foot)
Medal record
Men's surfing
Representing Brazil
World Games
Bronze medal – third place	2023 La Bocana	Team

João Vítor de Azeredo Chianca (Saquarema, August 30, 2000), sometimes known as Chumbinho, is a Brazilian professional surfer in the World Surf League (WSL). He qualified for the 2024 Olympic Games.

== Life ==
The younger brother of Lucas Chumbo and the son of Gustavo Chumbão, he made his debut in the main surfing competition in 2022. In the 2023 season, he was a semifinalist in the first two competitions of the season in Hawaii and won his first title in Portugal in Peniche, on Supertubos Beach.

== Career ==
After debuting in the World Surfing Elite in 2022, Chianca was unable to maintain himself after the mid-season cut. Still in 2022, competing in Challenge Series, he reclassified and returned to the CT in 2023. Returning to the CT in 2023, Chianca had his best career finish. With a strong start to the season he had two 3rd places in the first two events and his first CT victory in the MEO Rip Curl Pro Portugal event beating Jack Robinson in the final. At the end of the season he achieved his first classification at the WSL Finals 2023, beating Jack Robinson in the first heat and losing to Ethan Ewing shortly thereafter, finishing in fourth place, his best in the CT. In addition, he got Brazil's second place at the Olympic Games Paris 2024, his first Olympic participation.

Chianca injured his head free surfing in Hawaii before the start of the 2024 season and missed the entire start of the season due to injury. He also competed in 2 stages in the second half of the season and received a Season Wildcard for the 2025 season.

== Victories ==
WCT Wins
Year	Event	Venue	Country
2023	MEO Rip Curl Pro Portugal	Supertubos, Peniche	Portugal
WQS Wins
Year	Event	Venue	Country
2022	Layback Pro Rio	Prainha, Rio de Janeiro	Brazil
2019	Heroes de Mayo Iquique Pro	La Punta, Iquique	Chile
