= Colapinto =

Colapinto is a surname. Notable people with the surname include:

- Franco Colapinto (born 2003), Argentine racing driver
- Crosby Colapinto (born 2001), American surfer
- Griffin Colapinto (born 1998), American surfer
- John Colapinto (born 1958), Canadian journalist, author, and novelist
