= Caitlin Simmers =

American surfer

Personal information
- Born: October 26, 2005 (age 21) California, U.S.
- Height: 5 ft 2 in (157 cm)
- Weight: 114 lb (52 kg)

Surfing career
- Sport: Surfing
- Best year: 1st: 2024 - WSL World Champion
- Sponsors: Red Bull Surfing, O'Neill, Captain Fin Co., Sun Bum, Surf Ride, Nixon
- Major achievements: 2024 World Surf League Champion; WSL Championship Tour event wins: 8; 2023 WSL Rookie of the Year; 1x US Open of Surfing champion (2021)

Surfing specifications
- Stance: Regular (natural foot)
- Shaper: Chris Borst Designs

Caitlin Simmers (born October 26, 2005) is an American surfer from Oceanside, California, who has competed professionally since 2018. She qualified for the 2024 Olympic Games.

== Career ==
Simmers qualified for the 2022 CT by finishing fourth in the 2021 Challenger Series. Her first victory on the professional circuit was when she won the US Open of Surfing, the first event of the CS in 2021.

In 2022 Simmers, who was 16-years old, decided to withdraw from the 2022 WSL Championship Tour to focus on developing her surfing and staying close to her family. She returned to compete in the 2022 Challenger Series where she once again qualified for the 2023 WSL Championship Tour. She won the first CS event in 2022, beating Molly Picklum in the grand final of the Boost Mobile Gold Coast Pro in Australia.

=== 2023 Season ===
In 2023, Simmers made her debut in the world surfing elite. Her first major result was victory at MEO Rip Curl Pro Portugal beating Courtney Conlogue in the grand final. After the mid-season cut, Simmers remained in the top positions of the ranking. She won her second CT stage by defeating Tyler Wright in the VIVO Rio Pro event. She was second in the SHISEIDO Tahiti Pro, losing in the final to Caroline Marks. She finished the ranking in fifth place, qualifying for the Final Five of the WSL Finals 2023 in her first season in the CT. For being the best rookie of the season in the final rankings, she won the 2023 Rookie of the Year award. In the final five Simmers beat Molly Picklum in the first heat, but was defeated by Caroline Marks and finished fourth in the CT 2023 Final Ranking.

=== 2024 Season ===
Simmers started the 2024 season by winning the Lexus Pipe Pro stage for the first time, beating Molly Picklum in the final. She also won the Bells Beach stage in Australia and won the VIVO Rio Pro stage for the second consecutive year.

Simmers competed in the Paris Olympic Games in August 2024, being defeated in the Round of 16.

She finished the regular season in first place, competing in the 2024 WSL Finals directly in the title match. She faced the then 2023 World Champion Caroline Marks. Marks won the first Round, opening 1-0 in the title dispute, but Simmers won the next 2 Rounds and won the 2024 World Surfing title, becoming the youngest woman in history to achieve the feat, at just 18 years old.

== Personal life ==
Simmers was born on October 26, 2005 in Oceanside, California, and grew up near the coast where she started surfing when she was still very young. Parents, Ryan and Tracy Simmers, and brother, Timo, are all surfers, and were instrumental in encouraging Caitlin in the sport. Caitlin quickly fell in love with surfing, and began competing in local competitions.

== Surfing results ==
=== Victories ===
WSL Finals Wins
Year	Event	Venue	Country
2024	Lexus WSL Finals	Lower Trestles, California	United States

WCT Wins
Year	Event	Venue	Country
2026	Philippines Pro	Cloud 9, Siargao Island, Philippines	Philippines
2025	Surf Abu Dhabi Pro	Hudayriat Island, Abu Dhabi	United Arab Emirates
2024	VIVO Rio Pro	Saquarema, Rio de Janeiro	Brazil
2024	Rip Curl Pro Bells Beach	Bells Beach, Victoria	Australia
2024	Lexus Pipe Pro	Banzai Pipeline, Oahu	Hawaii
2023	VIVO Rio Pro	Saquarema, Rio de Janeiro	Brazil
2023	MEO Rip Curl Pro Portugal	Supertubos, Peniche	Portugal

WSL Challenger Series Wins
Year	Event	Venue	Country
2022	Boost Mobile Gold Coast Pro	Gold Coast, Queensland	Australia
2021	US Open of Surfing Huntington Beach	Huntington Beach, California	United States
Juniors Wins
Year	Event	Venue	Country
2022	Live Like Zander Junior Pro	Soup Bowl, Bathsheba	Barbados
2019	Vans US Open of Surfing	Huntington Beach, California	United States
2019	Ron Jon Roxy Junior Pro	Cocoa Beach, Florida	United States
