= Teresa Bonvalot =

Portuguese professional surfer

Personal information
- Born: 7 October 1999 (age 26) Cascais, Portugal
- Height: 175 cm (5 ft 9 in)
- Weight: 65 kg (143 lb)

Surfing career
- Sport: Surfing
- Best year: 2023 (18th)
- Career earnings: $94,300
- Sponsors: Rip Curl, Red Bull, Millennium BCP, JAM Traction, Allianz Portugal
- Major achievements: 2x European Junior Champion (2016, 2017); WSL Qualifying Series European Champion (2021/22); 5× Portuguese National Champion (2014, 2015, 2020, 2022, 2024); Challenger Series Champion - 2026 Ballito Pro

Surfing specifications
- Stance: Goofy
Medal record
World Games
Bronze medal – third place	2021 La Libertad	Women
Bronze medal – third place	2021 La Libertad	Team

Teresa Bonvalot (born 7 October 1999) is a Portuguese professional surfer. At club level she represents Sporting CP. She represented Portugal at the 2020 Summer Olympics in the women's shortboard event. In 2022, Teresa missed the WCT qualification by one spot but still managed to compete in the 2023 Tour as a wildcard. She qualified for the 2024 Olympic Games.

== Career ==
She placed 21st on the 2016 and 2015 Women's Championship Tour rankings after she placed twice 13th at Cascais Women's Pro in Portugal. She won the European surfing junior championionships both in 2016 and 2017.

In 2017 she placed 9th at the Cascais Women's Pro where she was a wildcard. This was her best result at a WCT event and she eventually ended the season at 20th in the WCT ranking, her best ever.

== Surfing results ==
=== Victories ===
WSL Challenger Series Wins
Year	Event	Venue	Country
2022	GWM Sydney Surf Pro	Manly Beach, Australia	Australia
World Qualifying Series Wins
Year	Event	Venue	Country
2024	Caparica Surf Fest	Costa da Caparica, Portugal	Portugal
2023	Rip Curl Pro Anglet	Anglet, France	France
2022	ABANCA Pantin Classic Galicia Pro	Valdoviño, Spain	Spain
2022	Estrella Galicia Caparica Surf Fest	Costa da Caparica, Portugal	Portugal
2022	Seat Pro	Netanya, Israel	Israel
2021	Azores Airlines Pro	Azores, Portugal	Portugal
2021	Estrella Galicia Caparica Surf Fest	Costa da Caparica, Portugal	Portugal
Juniors Wins
Year	Event	Venue	Country
2017	Junior Pro Espinho	Espinho, Portugal	Portugal
2017	Caparica Junior Pro	Costa da Caparica, Portugal	Portugal
2016	Pro A Coruna	Coruña, Spain	Spain
2016	Junior Pro Espinho	Espinho, Portugal	Portugal
2016	Caparica Junior Pro	Costa da Caparica, Portugal	Portugal
2015	Caparica Primavera Surf Fest	Costa da Caparica, Portugal	Portugal
