= Ethan Ewing =

Australian professional surfer (born 1998)

Personal information
- Born: 2 September 1998 (age 28) North Stradbroke Island, Queensland, Australia
- Height: 5 ft 11 in (180 cm)
- Weight: 169 lb (77 kg)

Surfing career
- Sport: Surfing
- Best year: 2023 – Ranked No. 2 WSL CT World Tour
- Sponsors: Billabong, Monster, Oakley, Future Fins
- Major achievements: 2016 WSL World Junior Champion; WSL Championship Tour event wins: 3

Surfing specifications
- Stance: Regular (natural foot)
Medal record
Men's surfing
Representing Australia
World Games
Bronze medal – third place	2024 Arecibo	Team

Ethan Ewing (born 2 September 1998) is an Australian professional surfer. Ewing had his best WSL performance in 2026, when he finished 1st on the CT after the regular season. In the wsl Gold Coast bonsoy pro qualified for the 2024 Olympic Games.

== Surfing characteristics ==
Ethan Ewing is known for his impeccable rail surfing, the Australian is often compared to Mick Fanning and Andy Irons, mainly for the way he attacks the waves, mainly by the use of speed, power and flow. Ewing surfs regular and tends to prioritize the more traditional Aussie lineup with a power surf. However, the "Aussie" also shows he can do airs, proving that at the 2023 Surf Ranch.

== Surfing career ==
Ethan started in the WSL in 2012 at the Junior World Championships and made his debut in the Men's Qualifying Series in 2015. In 2016, at the age of 18, he raised his level and was World Junior Champion and came second in the Qualifying Series, and qualified for the World Surf League (WCT) surfing. In 2017 he failed to establish himself in the elite of surfing finishing in 34th place.

He spent 3 years out of the professional surfing elite until returning in 2021. After a long adjustment, Ewing finally got into his stride on the Tour and won his first elite event in 2022 in Jeffreys Bay, South Africa, and secured a spot at the WSL Finals event, finishing 4º place in the world.

Since then he achieved another iconic event victory at Bells Beach in April 2023. Accompanied by performances at the VIVO Rio Pro, Corona Open J-Bay & Surf Ranch Pro; with respective results of 2nd, 2nd and 3rd. He finished in 3rd place in the regular season and secured his place in the 2023 WSL Finals he won Match 3 against Griffin Colapinto and competed in the 2023 world final against Filipe Toledo, Ethan lost both heats and came in 2nd place in the world, his best career result so far.

In 2024 Season, his best result in a stage, was second place in MEO Rip Curl Pro Portugal where he lost to Griffin Colapinto. He finished the regular season in 4th place and secured his place in the 2024 WSL Finals. In Match 1 he was defeated by ítalo Ferreira and ended the season in 5th place. Ethan competed in the 2024 Paris Olympic Games for the first time. He reached the quarterfinals, when he was eliminated by his compatriot Jack Robinson.

== Career victories ==
WCT Wins
Year	Event	Venue	Country
2026	Bonsoy Gold Coast Pro	Gold Coast, Queensland	Australia
2023	Rip Curl Pro Bells Beach	Bells Beach, Victoria	Australia
2022	Corona Open J-Bay	Jeffreys Bay, Eastern Cap	South Africa
WQS Wins
Year	Event	Venue	Country
2016	Burleigh Pro	Burleigh Heads, Queensland	Australia
2016	Essential Costa Rica Open	Esterillos Este, Parrita	Costa Rica
Juniors Wins
Year	Event	Venue	Country
2015	Carve Pro Junior	Maroubra, Sydney	Australia
