= Rio Waida =

Indonesian surfer (born 2000)

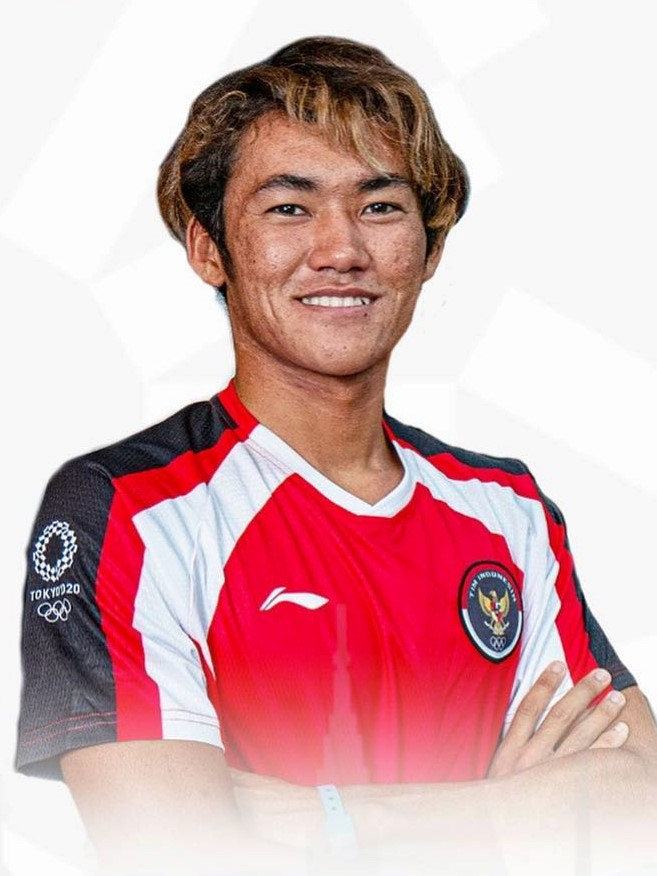
- Rio Waida Portrait on Flyer Ministry of Youth and Sport of Indonesia, 2021

Personal information
- Nickname: Rio
- Born: 25 January 2000 (age 26) Saitama, Japan
- Height: 5 ft 7 in (170 cm)
- Weight: 141 lb (64 kg)

Surfing career
- Sport: Surfing
- Best year: 2024 – Ranked #9 WSL CT World Tour

Surfing specifications
- Stance: Regular (natural foot)
Medal record
Men's surfing
Representing Indonesia
World Surfing Games
Silver medal – second place	2022 Huntington Beach	Men
SEA Games
Silver medal – second place	2019 Philippines	Shortboard

Rio Waida (和井田理央, Waida Rio; born 25 January 2000) is an Indonesian surfer. He won a silver medal for Indonesia at the SEA Games in Philippines, while the gold medal was won by fellow Indonesian surfer, Oney Anwar. He competed for Indonesia in surfing at the 2020 and 2024 Summer Olympics.

== Personal life ==
Born to an Indonesian father and a Japanese mother, Waida lived in Japan until he was 5 years old before moving to Bali.

== Career ==
Waida debuted in the WSL in the 2015 Qualiffing Series at the age of 15. He competed in 3 stages in the CT before entering the circuit, in 2019, 2021 and 2022 as a Wildcard. At 2019 ISA World Surfing Games Waida secured his qualification for the first surfing event of the 2020 Tokyo Summer Olympics, he was eliminated in the 3rd round to future Olympic medalist Kanoa Igarashi.

In the Challenger Series 2022 Waida started the season very well, winning 2 events, the GWM Sydney Surf Pro beating Ryan Callinan in the final and the traditional Ballito Pro, beating the Frenchman Gatien Delahaye. Even without great results in the other stages, the two victories were more than enough to guarantee 3rd place in the CS and guarantee a place for the first time in the CT.

In 2023 he debuted in CT, the highest level of professional surfing. Waida came in 21st place and remained in the 2024 CT. Competing in the 2024 ISA World Surfing Games, he secured classification for his second Olympic participation in his career. He was eliminated in Round 2 to Jordy Smith. At the 2024 CT, Waida had his best result in a stage in his career, reaching the final of Corona Fiji Pro 2024 and losing to Griffin Colapinto. He finished the season with his best career ranking of 9th.

In the 2025 season, Waida started the year by placing 2nd at the Surf Abu Dhabi Pro in the United Arab Emirates wave pool, losing the final to Ítalo Ferreira.

== Career victories ==
WSL Challenger Series Wins
Year	Event	Venue	Country
2022	Ballito Pro	Ballito, KwaZulu-Natal	South Africa
2022	GWM Sydney Surf Pro	Manly Beach, Sydney	Australia
WSL Qualifying Series Wins
Year	Event	Venue	Country
2023	Nias Pro	Nias, North Sumatra	Indonesia
2022	Vans Bali Pro	Kuta, Bali	Indonesia
2017	Hello Pacitan Pro	Pacitan	Indonesia
Juniors Wins
Year	Event	Venue	Country
2018	Billabong Junior Series Ballito	KwaZulu-Natal	South Africa
2018	Ise Shima Pro Junior	Ise-Shima	Japan

== See also ==
- International Surfing Association
- World Surf League
- Surfing in Indonesia

Olympic Games
Preceded by Maria Natalia Londa	Flagbearer for Indonesia; Tokyo 2020	Succeeded by Maryam March Maharani
