= 2023 World Surf League Finals =

- Venue: Lower Trestles
- Location: San Clemente, California, United States
- Dates: September 9, 2023
- Competitors: 10 from 4 nations

Champions
- Men: (Brazil) Filipe Toledo (2)
- Women: (United States) Caroline Marks (1)

The 2023 Rip Curl WSL Finals was the 11th and final event of the 2023 World Surf League. It was the third edition of the World Surf League Finals, and took place at Lower Trestles in California on September 9, 2023.

== Format ==
The event featured the top five surfers from both the men's and women's regular season standings, and consisted of four head-to-head matches, held on a single day. In the first match, the surfers ranked fourth and fifth went head-to-head, with the winner advancing to take on the third-ranked surfer in the second match. The winner of the second match then took on the second-ranked surfer in the third match, with the winner qualifying for the title match against the top-ranked surfer in the standings.

== Results ==
=== Men ===
==== Draw ====
Match 1
4	(Brazil) João Chianca	15.33
5	(Australia) Jack Robinson	11.87

Match 2
3	(Australia) Ethan Ewing	17.60
4	(Brazil) João Chianca	14.57

Match 3
2	(United States) Griffin Colapinto	15.96
3	(Australia) Ethan Ewing	17.10

Title match
1	(Brazil) Filipe Toledo	2
3	(Australia) Ethan Ewing	0

==== Title match ====
(Brazil) Filipe Toledo	Round	(Australia) Ethan Ewing
17.97	1	17.23
14.27	2	12.37
—	3	—

=== Women ===
==== Draw ====
Match 1
4	(Australia) Molly Picklum	12.17
5	(United States) Caitlin Simmers	15.17

Match 2
3	(United States) Caroline Marks	11.67
5	(United States) Caitlin Simmers	10.36

Match 3
2	(Australia) Tyler Wright	13.70
3	(United States) Caroline Marks	17.40

Title match
1	(Hawaii) Carissa Moore	0
3	(United States) Caroline Marks	2

==== Title match ====
(Hawaii) Carissa Moore	Round	(United States) Caroline Marks
14.97	1	17.10
13.53	2	14.60
—	3	—
