= Freshwater Pro =

- Sport: Surfing
- Country: United States
- Most recent champions: Men: (United States) Griffin Colapinto; Women: (Hawaii) Carissa Moore

The Surf Ranch Pro is a professional surfing competition, currently one of the events of the World Surf League. The competition is held annually at Kelly Slater's Surf Ranch in Lemoore, California. Held for the first time in 2018, it was the first World Surf League event to be staged in an artificial wave pool. The event was rebranded as the 'Freshwater Pro' in 2019, but returned to its original name and is officially the Jeep Surf Ranch Pro presented by Adobe.

== Results ==
=== Men ===
Year	Winner	Score	Runner-Up	Score
2018	(Brazil) Gabriel Medina	17.86	(Brazil) Filipe Toledo	17.03
2019	(Brazil) Gabriel Medina (2)	18.86	(Brazil) Filipe Toledo	17.33
2021	(Brazil) Filipe Toledo	17.94	(Brazil) Gabriel Medina	10.60
2023	(United States) Griffin Colapinto	17.77	(Brazil) Italo Ferreira	17.13

=== Women ===
Year	Winner	Score	Runner-Up	Score
2018	(Hawaii) Carissa Moore	17.80	(Australia) Stephanie Gilmore	16.70
2019	(United States) Lakey Peterson	18.03	(France) Johanne Defay	17.60
2021	(France) Johanne Defay	16.63	(Hawaii) Carissa Moore	16.23
2023	(Hawaii) Carissa Moore (2)	16.53	(United States) Caroline Marks	15.43
