= 2021 World Surf League Finals =

- Venue: Lower Trestles
- Location: San Clemente, California, United States
- Dates: 14 September 2021
- Competitors: 10 from 5 nations

Champions
- Men: (Brazil) Gabriel Medina (3)
- Women: (Hawaii) Carissa Moore (5)

The 2021 Rip Curl WSL Finals was the eighth and final event of the 2021 World Surf League. It was the inaugural edition of the World Surf League Finals, and took place at Lower Trestles in California on 14 September 2021.

The men's event was won by Brazil's Gabriel Medina, while the women's event was won by Hawaii's Carissa Moore.

== Format ==
The event featured the top five surfers from both the men's and women's regular season standings, and consisted of four head-to-head matches, held on a single day. In the first match, the surfers ranked fourth and fifth went head-to-head, with the winner advancing to take on the third-ranked surfer in the second match. The winner of the second match then took on the second-ranked surfer in the third match, with the winner qualifying for the title match against the top-ranked surfer in the standings.

== Results ==
=== Men ===
==== Draw ====
Match 1
4	(United States) Conner Coffin	15.00
5	(Australia) Morgan Cibilic	9.84

Match 2
3	(Brazil) Filipe Toledo	16.57
4	(United States) Conner Coffin	14.33

Match 3
2	(Brazil) Ítalo Ferreira	12.44
3	(Brazil) Filipe Toledo	15.97

Title match
1	(Brazil) Gabriel Medina	2
3	(Brazil) Filipe Toledo	0

==== Title match ====
(Brazil) Gabriel Medina	Round	(Brazil) Filipe Toledo
16.30	1	15.70
17.53	2	16.36
–	3	–

=== Women ===
==== Draw ====
Match 1
4	(Australia) Stephanie Gilmore	6.70
5	(France) Johanne Defay	12.17

Match 2
3	(Australia) Sally Fitzgibbons	11.33
5	(France) Johanne Defay	6.66

Match 3
2	(Brazil) Tatiana Weston-Webb	13.17
3	(Australia) Sally Fitzgibbons	11.73

Title match
1	(Hawaii) Carissa Moore	2
2	(Brazil) Tatiana Weston-Webb	1

==== Title match ====
(Hawaii) Carissa Moore	Round	(Brazil) Tatiana Weston-Webb
14.06	1	15.20
17.26	2	15.60
16.60	3	14.20
