= Jake Marshall =

American professional surfer (born 1998)

Personal information
- Born: November 12, 1998 (age 27) Encinitas, California, U.S.
- Height: 6 ft 0 in (1.83 m)
- Weight: 163 lb (74 kg)

Surfing career
- Sport: Surfing
- Best year: 2024 – Ranked No. 11 WSL CT World Tour
- Sponsors: Hurley, FCS

Surfing specifications
- Stance: Regular

Jake Marshall (born November 12, 1998) is an American professional surfer who is in the World Surf League.

== Career ==
Marshall began his career on the WSL Junior Tour in 2011. In 2021 he placed 6th in the Challenger Series, reaching the final of the US Open of Surfing Huntington Beach losing to Griffin Colapinto, and qualified for the 2022 CT season for the first time in his career.

In 2023 he was eliminated from the CT at the mid-season cut, but placed 8th in the CS of the same year and returned to the CT in 2024, where he achieved the best placement of his career so far, placing 11th.
