= Samuel Pupo =

Brazilian surfer

Personal information
- Born: October 27, 2000 (age 25) Maresias, SP, Brazil
- Height: 5 ft 9 in (1.75 m)
- Weight: 169 lb (77 kg)

Surfing career
- Sport: Surfing
- Best year: 2022 – Ranked No. 10 WSL CT World Tour
- Career earnings: Rip Curl, AW Reality, Ocean Drop, Silverbay
- Major achievements: 2024 Challenger Series champion; 2022 WSL Rookie of the Year

Surfing specifications
- Stance: Regular

Samuel Pupo (born October 27, 2000) better known as Samuca, is a Brazilian professional surfer who is in the World Surf League.

== Career ==
Pupo made his debut in the World Surf League (WSL) in 2022, finishing the season in 10th place in the rankings, and was named Rookie of the Year that season.

In 2023, Pupo did not make it past the mid-season cutoff and had to compete in the Challenger Series, winning two events that year and finishing in 2nd place, returning to the CT in 2024.

In 2024, he again made the mid-season cutoff. He won one event of the CS and in October 2024 he was champion of the Challenger Series, the access division of the World Surfing Circuit.

== Career Victories ==
WSL Challenger Series Wins
Year	Event	Venue	Country
2025	Banco do Brasil Saquarema Pro	Saquarema, Rio de Janeiro, Brazil	Brazil
2024	EDP Ericeira Pro	Ribeira D'Ilhas, Ericeira	Portugal
2023	Corona Saquarema Pro	Saquarema, Rio de Janeiro	Brazil
2023	Boost Mobile Gold Coast Pro	Gold Coast, Queensland	Australia
WQS Wins
Year	Event	Venue	Country
2019	EDP Billabong Pro Ericeira	Ribeira D'Ilhas, Ericeira	Portugal
Juniors Wins
Year	Event	Venue	Country
2018	O'Neill Pro Junior presentado por Petroperu	Piura, Talara	Peru
2017	Billabong Junior Series	Ballito, KwaZulu-Natal	South Africa
