= Morgan Cibilic =

Australian professional surfer (born 1992)

Personal information
- Born: 18 October 1999 (age 26) Angourie, New South Wales, Australia
- Height: 5 ft 9 in (1.75 m)
- Weight: 158 lb (72 kg)

Surfing career
- Sport: Surfing
- Best year: 2021 – Ranked No. 4 WSL CT World Tour
- Major achievements: 2021 WSL Rookie of the Year

Surfing specifications
- Stance: Regular
Medal record
Surfing
Representing Australia
World Surfing Games
| Gold medal – first place | 2025 Surf City | Team |
| Bronze medal – third place | 2025 Surf City | Individual |

Morgan Cibilic (born 18 October 1999, in Angourie, New South Wales) is an Australian professional surfer.

== Surfing career ==
Cibilic started on the professional circuit in 2015 on the Junior Tour. He played in the Qualifying Series until 2019, when he finished in 11th place and secured the last spot on the 2020 Championship Tour.

Cibilic made his CT debut in the 2021 season. He reached the final of the Rip Curl Rottnest Search, losing to Gabriel Medina, as well as other good results that saw him finish the season in 5th place, qualifying for the first WSL Finals in history as a Rookie. With this placing he was the best Rookie of the season and won the 2021 WSL Rookie of the Year. In the Finals, he lost to American Conner Coffin.

In the 2022 season, Cibilic finished 29th in the mid-season cut-off, failing to reclassify for next season's CT. Since then, he has been trying to get back into the CT via the Challenger Series. He took part in the 2024 season at the Bells Beach as a replacement, finishing 5th in the event.

== Career victories ==
WQS Wins
| Year | Event | Venue | Country |
| 2023 | Krui Pro | Ujung Bocur, Krui | Indonesia |
| 2018 | Mandurah Pro | Mandurah, Western Australia | Australia |
Juniors Wins
| Year | Event | Venue | Country |
| 2017 | Subway Pro Junior Gold Coast | Gold Coast, Queensland | Australia |
