= MEO Rip Curl Pro Portugal =

Portuguese surfing competition

MEO Pro Portugal
- Current season, competition or edition: MEO Rip Curl Pro Portugal 2026
- Sport: Surfing
- Country: Portugal
- Most recent champions: (United States) Griffin Colapinto (men) (Australia) Molly Picklum (women)
- Most titles: (United States) Griffin Colapinto (3 titles) (men) (United States) Caroline Marks (2 titles) (women)

MEO Rip Curl Pro Portugal formerly known as MEO Pro Portugal, Moche Rip Curl Pro Portugal or Rip Curl Pro Portugal is a professional surfing competition of the WSL World Tour. As of 2022, held every year in March at the Supertubos beach in Peniche, Portugal. The event was first founded in 2010 as Rip Curl Pro Portugal.

The defending men's champion is the Californian surfer Griffin Colapinto who won the event in 2022 after the break due to the COVID-19 outbreak. Before, Brazilian surfer Italo Ferreira won the event both in 2018 and 2019, being the first back-to-back winner ever on the event.

The defending women's champion is the Brazilian goofy-footed surfer Tatiana Weston-Webb, who beat American runner-up Lakey Peterson in 2022.

In 2016, due to the lack of surfing conditions on Supertubos beach, the WSL organization explored other possibilities in the peninsula and moved temporarily to Point Fabril, between Almagreira and Pico da Mota, where the waves were big and curly providing a good show for the spectators. The Round 5 of the event was done there, then the conditions on Supertubos came back, and the competition returned to its normality.

In August 2018, it was announced by the WSL that Peniche will receive once again the women's competition after nine years without it, which they lost to Cascais. Peniche will host both the men's and women's competition.

== Naming ==
Since the birth of this competition it had four different titles due to sponsor deals.

Name	Years
Rip Curl Pro Portugal	2010–2013
Moche Rip Curl Pro Portugal	2014–2015
MEO Rip Curl Pro Portugal	2016–present
MEO Pro Portugal	2022

== Winners ==
The MEO Rip Curl Pro Portugal event gives birth to a new champion each and every year. The past champions of the listed WSL competition are located below.

Finished season as world champion

Men's
Year	Winner	Score	Runner-up	Score
2010	Kelly Slater (USA)	13.33	Jordy Smith (ZAF)	11.43
2011	Adriano de Souza (BRA)	15.67	Kelly Slater (USA)	14.73
2012	Julian Wilson (AUS)	16.26	Gabriel Medina (BRA)	15.37
2013	Kai Otton (AUS)	12.23	Nat Young (USA)	11.03
2014	Mick Fanning (AUS)	15.50	Jordy Smith (ZAF)	7.67
2015	Filipe Toledo (BRA)	17.83	Italo Ferreira (BRA)	17.13
2016	John John Florence (HAW)	16.67	Conner Coffin (USA)	9.93
2017	Gabriel Medina (BRA)	13.26	Julian Wilson (AUS)	10.94
2018	Italo Ferreira (BRA)	15.93	Joan Duru (FRA)	10.77
2019	Italo Ferreira (BRA)^{[2]}	18.43	Jordy Smith (ZAF)	6.17
2022	Griffin Colapinto (USA)	14.34	Filipe Toledo (BRA)	14.20
2023	João Chianca (BRA)	17.57	Jack Robinson (AUS)	15.14
2024	Griffin Colapinto (USA)^{[2]}	17.94	Ethan Ewing (AUS)	11.13
2025	Yago Dora (BRA)	13.37	Italo Ferreira (BRA)	12.43
2026	Griffin Colapinto (USA)^{[3]}	17.60	Gabriel Medina (BRA)	16.77

Women's
Year	Winner	Score	Runner-up	Score
2010	Carissa Moore (HAW)	17.44	Stephanie Gilmore (AUS)	8.60
2019	Caroline Marks (USA)	13.73	Lakey Peterson (USA)	6.27
2022	Tatiana Weston-Webb (BRA)	15.33	Lakey Peterson (USA)	14.27
2023	Caitlin Simmers (USA)	13.50	Courtney Conlogue (USA)	12.83
2024	Johanne Defay (FRA)	10.83	Tyler Wright (AUS)	5.50
2025	Caroline Marks (USA)^{[2]}	7.90	Gabriela Bryan (HAW)	6.97
2026	Molly Picklum (AUS)	13.33	Caitlin Simmers (USA)	12.84

== See also ==
- World Surf League
- Supertubos
