= Bettylou Sakura Johnson =

American surfer (born 2005)

Personal information
- Born: March 22, 2005 (age 20); Haleiwa, Hawaii, US
- Height: 5 ft 7 in (170 cm)
- Weight: 127 lb (58 kg)

Surfing career
- Best year: 2025 – Ranked #5 WSL CT World Tour
- Sponsors: Roxy
- Major achievements: WSL Championship Tour event wins: 2; 2022 Challenger Series champion; 1x US Open of Surfing champion (2022)

Surfing specifications
- Stance: Regular (natural foot)

Bettylou Sakura Johnson (born March 22, 2005) is an American surfer who has competed professionally since 2019.

== Career ==
In 2022 Johnson qualified to compete at the top flight of professional surfing, the World Surf League Championship Tour (CT) for the 2023 season.

Johnson missed out on qualification for the CT, the top-flight of professional surfing, during the mid-season cut. However, she later qualified for the CT after winning the Challenger Series at the end of 2022.

== Personal life ==
Johnson first began surfing aged 6 in Haleiwa, Hawaii. Before she surfed, she was a gymnast and a dirt-bike rider.

== Surfing results ==
=== Victories ===
WCT Wins
Year	Event	Venue	Country
2025	Lexus Trestles Pro	Trestles, California	United States
2025	Bonsoy Gold Coast Pro	Gold Coast, Queensland	Australia

WSL Challenger Series Wins
Year	Event	Venue	Country
2022	VANS US Open of Surfing	Huntington Beach, California	United States
2021	Michelob ULTRA Pure Gold Haleiwa Challenger	Haleiwa, Oahu	Hawaii
