= Crosby Colapinto =

American professional surfer

Personal information
- Born: July 15, 2001 (age 24) San Clemente, California, U.S.
- Height: 5 ft 11 in (1.80 m)

Surfing career
- Sport: Surfing
- Best year: 2024 – Ranked No. 10 WSL CT World Tour
- Sponsors: Rip Curl, Monster Energy, Dragon Alliance, FCS, Lost Surfboards
- Major achievements: 2024 WSL Rookie of the Year

Surfing specifications
- Stance: Regular

Crosby Colapinto (born July 15, 2001) is an American professional surfer who is in the World Surf League.

== Career ==
Crosby began his career on the Junior Tour in 2017. In 2022 he won the Virtual Vans Triple Crown (Pipeline).

In 2023 Crosby took 4th place in the Challenger Series and got his spot for the first time in the CT, joining his brother Griffin Colapinto in the biggest competition in world surfing.

In the 2024 season, Crosby achieved his best result in a stage, a third place in the MEO Rip Curl Pro Portugal. He finished his rookie season in 10th place and won the 2024 WSL Rookie of the Year.

== Career victories ==
WQS Wins
Year	Event	Venue	Country
2023	Barbados Surf Pro	Soup Bowl, Bathsheba	Barbados
2019	Jack's Surfboards Pro	Huntington Beach, California	United States

Juniors Wins
Year	Event	Venue	Country
2019	Vans Pro Junior	Virginia Beach, Virginia	United States
2018	Live Like Zander Junior Pro	Soup Bowl, Bathsheba	Barbados
2018	Los Cabos Open of Surf	Zippers, San Jose del Cabo	Mexico

== Other work ==
Crosby and his brother Griffin Colapinto post surfing highlights to their YouTube channel, Cola Bros, which has gained a strong following.
