= Brisa Hennessy =

Costa Rican surfer (born 1999)

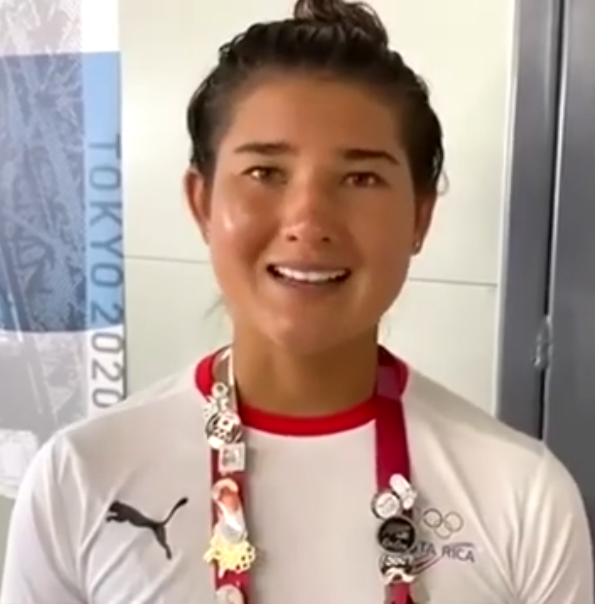
- In a 2021 interview
- Born: Brisa Tomi Hennessy Kobara; September 16, 1999 (age 27); San José, Costa Rica
- Agent: Athelo Group
- Surfing career
- Height: 5 ft 4 in (163 cm)
- Weight: 125 lb (57 kg)
- Sport: Surfing
- Best year: 2024 – Ranked #4 WSL CT World Tour
- Sponsors: Pro-Lite, Rip Curl, Snow Monkey
- Major achievements: WSL Championship Tour event wins: 1; Qualification for 2020 Summer Olympics, 2x ISA World Gold Medalist; Pan American Games Gold Medalist; 2024 Summer Olympics 4th place

Surfing specifications
- Stance: Regular

Brisa Tomi Hennessy Kobara (born September 16, 1999) is a Costa Rican professional surfer who competes in the World Surf League (WSL). In 2019, Hennessy's standing in the WSL qualified her to represent Costa Rica for Surfing at the 2020 Summer Olympics in Tokyo, Japan. The Tokyo Olympics marked the first instance for surfing to be recognised as an Olympic sport. She participated at the 2024 Olympic Games achieving the fourth place, one of the best performances for a Costa Rican athlete.

== Early life ==
When she was three years old, Hennessy stood up on her first wave. She was born in San José, but grew up on the Osa Peninsula of Costa Rica, where both of her parents ran a surf school. Hennessy lived in Costa Rica until the age of nine when she moved to Oahu to pursue a professional surfing career. She also spent summers in Fiji, giving her exposure to some of the best conditions the sport has to offer at a young age. Brisa still lives somewhat of a nomadic lifestyle to this day, traveling from place to place wherever her career takes her. She does not have a permanent residence.

== Career victories ==
WCT Wins
Year	Event	Venue	Country
2022	Hurley Pro Sunset Beach	Sunset Beach, Oahu	Hawaii
WSL Challenger Series Wins
Year	Event	Venue	Country
2021	Roxy Pro France	Hossegor, Nouvelle-Aquitaine	France

== Professional career ==
Hennessy qualified for the World Surf League Championship Tour in 2018 at the age of 18. She became the first Costa Rican to qualify for the tour. She recorded her highest finish ever at the WSL Corona Bali Protected event in 2019, where she took home third place at the annual event. In 2019 she had seven Top 10 finishes throughout the season.

In December 2019, Hennessy's standing on the WTC Championship Tour earned her direct qualification to the Tokyo Summer Olympics. She was one of the final two surfers to qualify for the games through the WSL. She became the first Central American surfer to earn a spot in the Olympic Games as well as just the fifth Costa Rican athlete to qualify for any competition in Tokyo. In a 2019 interview with the International Surfing Association, she said that bringing a medal home to her homeland of Costa Rica would give her “goosebumps.”

When the COVID-19 pandemic struck in March 2020, Hennessy relocated to Fiji to live with her parents who had recently established a permanent home on the remote island.

She is represented professionally by Athelo Group, a sports agency based out of Stamford, Connecticut.

Brisa Hennessy qualified for the 2024 Olympics in Paris. She secured her spot thanks to her strong performance on the Championship Tour. This will be her second consecutive Olympic appearance, following her impressive fifth-place finish at the Tokyo 2020 Olympics on which got defeated by surfer Caroline Marks in the quarterfinals.

== Current life ==
Outside of surfing, Hennessy enjoys cooking. She is a plant-based athlete who started her own YouTube channel during the pandemic to share her vegan recipes with fans and followers.
