= Caroline Marks =

American professional surfer (born 2002)

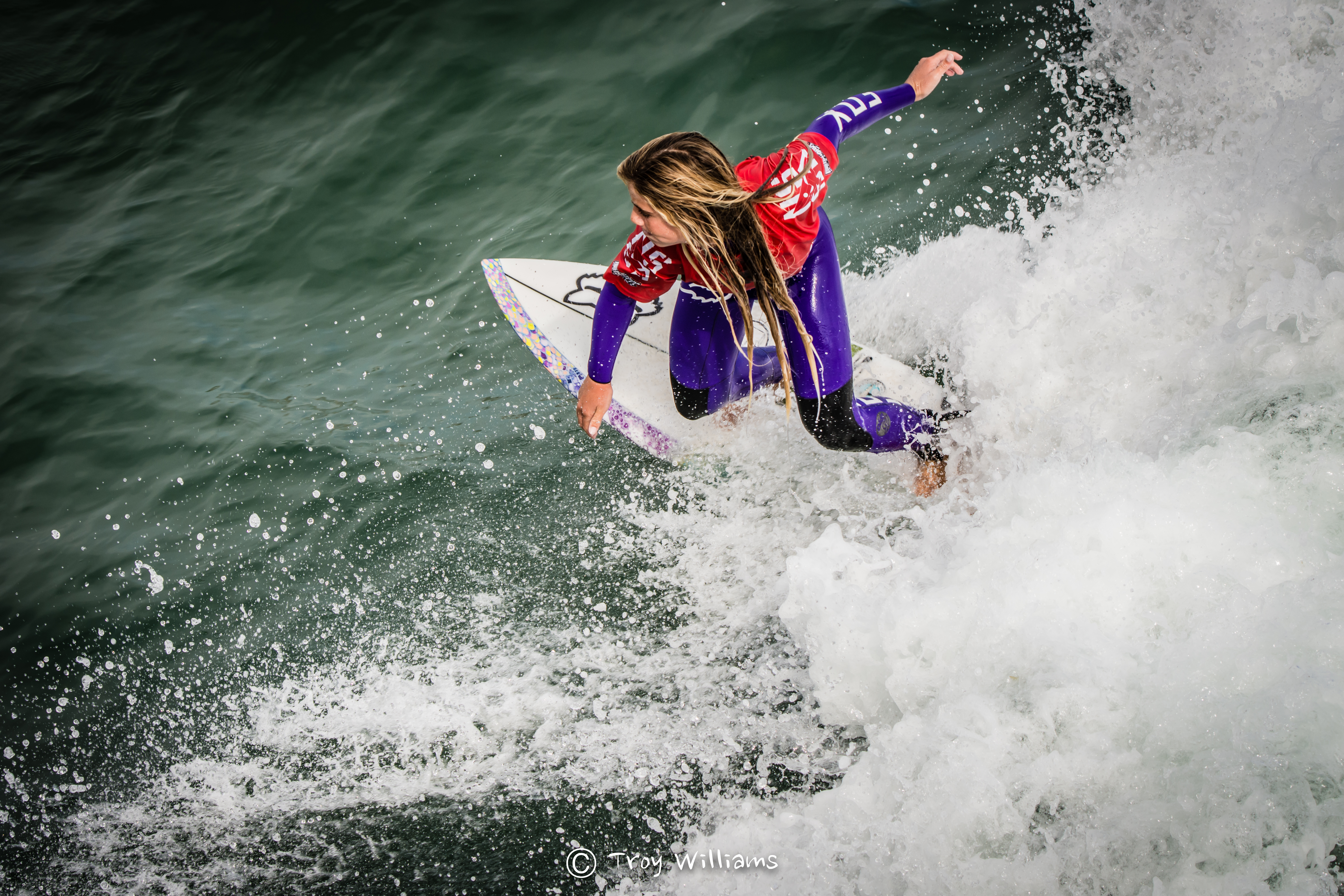
- Marks in 2015

Personal information
- Born: February 14, 2002 (age 24) Boca Raton, Florida, U.S.
- Height: 5 ft 5 in (165 cm)
- Weight: 127 lb (58 kg)

Surfing career
- Sport: Surfing
- Best year: 1st: 2023 – WSL World Champion
- Sponsors: Red Bull, Oakley, Roxy
- Major achievements: 2024 Olympics Gold Medal; 2023 World Surf League Champion; WSL Championship Tour event wins: 8; 2018 WSL Rookie of the Year

Surfing specifications
- Stance: Goofy
Medal record
Women's surfing
Representing United States
Olympic Games
Gold medal – first place	2024 Paris	Shortboard
World Games
Silver medal – second place	2019 Miyazaki	Team

Caroline Marks (born February 14, 2002) is an American professional surfer. She is the 2023 World Surf League Women's World Tour Champion and an Olympic gold medalist at the 2024 Paris Olympics. She has won multiple national championships and is the youngest woman to compete in a World Surf League event. Marks is the youngest surfer to qualify for the women's Championship Tour.

She competed in the elite (top 16) of the World Surf League and ended 2018 season in 7th place, earning Rookie of the Year. She lives in San Clemente, California.

In 2019, Marks qualified as one of the two women on the United States' first surfing team to compete at the 2020 Summer Olympics in Tokyo, Japan. At the 2024 Summer Olympics, she won the gold medal in the women's shortboard event. Marks was inducted into the Surfers' Hall of Fame on August 1, 2025.

== Early life ==
Marks' mother and grandmother were raised in Greece. Marks' mother later moved to the United States and gave birth to Marks in Florida. She is the third of six children. The house she grew up in had a large backyard with a motorbike-track, halfpipe, and a surf break across the street. She discovered her love of sports through barrel racing and began surfing competitively when she was 8 years old. Marks and her siblings have all supported and encouraged each other in their individual passions. When her older brother Zach was 12, he created the social media site Grom Social for kids, and Marks helped create images and characters for the site. She continues to post on the site as herself, updating users on her adventures and accomplishments. Likewise, her brother, other siblings and the rest of her family have been a constant presence at her competitions, cheering her on, giving her pointers and shouldering her when she takes home a win. Marks attributes her success and how good she is to her brothers and her roots of trying to impress them when she was growing up.

== Career ==
=== 2018 ===
In 2018, her first year on tour, Marks had three third-place finishes in 10 events. She was named Rookie of the Year and finished the season ranked seventh in the world.

=== 2019 ===
In April 2019, at the first event of the WSL Championship tour, Marks defeated then seven-time world champion Stephanie Gilmore at the Australian's home break of Duranbah, New South Wales in the quarter-finals of the Boost Mobile Pro Gold Coast. She then continued through the semi-finals, beating Malia Manuel. In the finals, she defeated three-time world champion Carissa Moore to claim her first WSL event title, beginning the 2019 season as the world's top-ranked female surfer.

She is the first surfer to receive Team USA's Best of April Award, which recognizes the outstanding achievements of prospective Team USA Olympic athletes. "Caroline is one of those rare athletes that from when she was 12 years old it was obvious that she was going to be world champion," said USA Surfing head coach Chris Stone. "Not if, but when. To see what she's doing at 17 years old must be frightening to all her competitors. I can't wait to see what the future holds for her."

==== 2019 World Championship Tour ====
In December 2019, she finished second on the WSL Championship tour to Carissa Moore. By finishing second, Marks earned a spot on the team for the 2020 Olympics in Tokyo, along with Moore.

=== 2021 ===
Marks tested positive for COVID-19 in advance of a World Surf League competition in Australia in early 2021 and later found out it was a false positive, which nullified her fears of not being able to compete.

==== 2020 Summer Olympics ====
Marks was the youngest surfer to qualify for the 2020 Summer Olympics postponed to July and August 2021 due to the COVID-19 pandemic.

In round one of shortboard competition, Marks scored a total of 13.40 points, won her heat, and advanced directly to round three of competition. In the third round of competition, a head-to head elimination round where two surfers competed in each heat and only the highest scoring surfer advanced to the quarterfinals, Marks won her heat against Mahina Maeda with a score of 15.33 and advanced to the quarterfinals of competition. Her score of 15.33 was the highest score of all the competitors, male or female, in the third round of competition for all surfing events at the 2020 Olympics.

In the quarterfinals, Marks won her head-to-head heat against Brisa Hennessy with a score of 12.50 points and qualified for the semi-finals. Marks did not advance to the final heat after her semi-final match against Bianca Buitendag, and instead advanced to the heat determining the winner of the bronze medal. In her final match against Amuro Tsuzuki, Tsuzuki won the bronze medal and Marks ended the competition ranked fourth overall.

=== 2022 ===
In February 2022, Marks withdrew before the second event of the season and took time away from tour "to deal with some recurring medical and health issues." She missed half the season and did not qualify for the WSL Finals.

=== 2024 ===
Won Gold during the 2024 Paris Olympics in Teahupo'o Reef Pass, Tahiti for Team USA.

== Career victories ==
WSL Finals Wins
Year	Event	Venue	Country
2023	Rip Curl WSL Finals	Lower Trestles, California	United States

WCT Wins
Year	Event	Venue	Country
2025	MEO Rip Curl Pro Portugal	Supertubos, Peniche	Portugal
2024	Surf City El Salvador Pro	Punta Roca, La Libertad	El Salvador
2023	SHISEIDO Tahiti Pro	Teahupo'o, Tahiti	French Polynesia
2023	Surf City El Salvador Pro	Punta Roca, La Libertad	El Salvador
2021	Rip Curl Narrabeen Classic presented by Corona	Narrabeen, New South Wales	Australia
2019	MEO Rip Curl Pro Portugal	Supertubos, Peniche	Portugal
2019	Boost Mobile Pro Gold Coast	Gold Coast, Queensland	Australia
WQS Wins
Year	Event	Venue	Country
2022	U.S. Air Force Super Girl Surf Pro	Jacksonville, Florida	United States
2021	Nissan Super Girl Surf Pro	Oceanside Pier, California	United States
2019	Florida Pro	Sebastian Inlet, Florida	United States
2018	Ron Jon Florida Pro	Sebastian Inlet, Florida	United States
2018	Los Cabos Open of Surf	Zippers, San Jose del Cabo	Mexico
Juniors Wins
Year	Event	Venue	Country
2016	Vans US Open of Surfing (W JUN)	Huntington Beach, California	United States
2015	Junior Women's Vans US Open of Surfing	Huntington Beach, California	United States

Olympics
Year	Event	Venue	Country
2024	Olympic Surfing Competition	Teahupo'o, Tahiti	France

== Junior event wins ==
- 2015 US Open Jr. Champion
- 2016 ISA Girls World Champion (U16)
- 2016 US Open Jr. Champion

== Open event wins ==
- 2015 Volcom World VQS Champion
- 2x Open Women's NSSA Champion
- 6x Surfing America Champion
- 2x Open Girls NSSA Champion

== Personal life ==
Marks has a YouTube channel she started February 23, 2021, where she uploads videos related to her surfing. Her first video featured her surfing with Lakey Peterson.

Marks is a feminist and an advocate for body image positivity in women aiming to reduce the sexualization of women's bodies when they are still going through puberty.
