= Moana Jones Wong =

American surfer

Moanalani Jones Wong (born May 16, 1999) is an American surfer who has been called the "Queen of Pipeline".

== Early life and education ==
Jones Wong was born and raised on the North Shore of Oahu, Hawaii, alongside her younger sister. She was homeschooled.

She entered the University of Hawaiʻi at West Oʻahu in 2016, initially majoring in biology. In her junior year, she switched her degree to Hawaiian and Indigenous Health and Healing (HIHH), after taking a class in the subject. She graduated in 2021, and was part of the first class of students to graduate with the HIHH degree. Her thesis was on surfing and its importance in Native Hawaiian culture.

== Surfing career ==
Jones Wong began surfing as a child, and competed in her first surf contest at age 5. As she grew older, she was driven to improve her surfing skills in order to keep up with her close friends, who were also surfers. She first paddled out to the Banzai Pipeline at age 12.

At age 11, she began a sponsorship with Billabong, which she continued until age 17. Jones Wong competed in local contests until age 16.

Jones Wong has never trained under a coach, and has said she doesn't follow any specific training or diet regimes. In 2022, Wong began wearing a helmet while surfing the Banzai Pipeline.

Jones Wong competed in the 2014 Surf n Sea Pipeline Women's Pro, and in 2015 came fourth in the event's final. She also competed in the 32-mile Molokai 2 Oahu paddle race with her father, Dawson Jones.

In late 2021, Jones Wong won the HIC Pipe Pro.

She won first place in the women's division of the 2021 Vans Pipe Masters, and won the 2023 event the following year.

In June 2023, Jones Wong was included among the surfers profiled in the docuseries Surf Girls.

== Personal life ==
Jones Wong is of Native Hawaiian descent. She met her husband, Tehotu Wong, at V-Land, a surfing spot on the North Shore. In her spare time, she does jiu jitsu and hula.
