= Griffin Colapinto =

American professional surfer (born 1998)

Personal information
- Born: July 29, 1998 (age 28) San Clemente, California, U.S.
- Height: 5 ft 11 in (180 cm)
- Weight: 171 lb (78 kg)

Surfing career
- Sport: Surfing
- Best year: 2025 – Ranked No. 2 WSL CT World Tour
- Sponsors: Quiksilver, Red Bull, Oakley, Inc., Creatures of Leisure
- Major achievements: WSL Championship Tour event wins: 6; 2017 World Qualifying Series Champion; 1x US Open of Surfing champion (2021)

Surfing specifications
- Stance: Regular (natural foot)
Medal record
Men's surfing
Representing United States
World Games
Gold medal – first place	2022 Huntington Beach	Team

Griffin Colapinto (/ˌkoʊləˈpɪntoʊ/ KOH-lə-PIN-toh; born July 29, 1998) is an American professional surfer who has competed on the World Surf League Men's World Tour since 2018.

Colapinto has finished three times in the top three of the World Surf League Championship, in 2023, 2024, and 2025. He qualified for the 2024 Olympic Games where he was eliminated in the third round of the men's shortboard competition.

== Surfing career ==
Colapinto has been surfing in competition since the 2011 men's junior season at 13 years old. In 2015, he won first place at the Junior Men's US Open of Surfing.

As a junior surfer, Colapinto went viral in 2016 with an air-reverse to win a Qualifying Series heat at the Hawaii Pro.

In 2017, he made the final of the WSL's World Junior Championship. He finished the year winning the Triple Crown in Hawaii and claimed the top spot in the Qualifying Series rankings. He thus qualified for the following year's Championship Tour.

At the 2018 Quiksilver Pro Gold Coast he completed a triple-barrel and scored a perfect 10, and obtained a third-place finish. He finished the 2018 season in 18th place, and later went on to finish the 2019 season in 16th place.

Colapinto finished in the Top 10 for the first time at the end of 2021, in 6th place. He also won the 2021 US Open of Surfing in the WSL Challenger Series.

For the 2022 season, he won the MEO Pro Portugal and Surf City El Salvador Pro, and finished the season in 7th place.

In 2023, Colapinto qualified for the first time for the 2023 Rip Curl World Surf League Finals held at his hometown surf break at the Lower Trestles in San Clemente. During the season, he won the Surf Ranch Pro, as well as finished as the runner-up at the Hurley Pro Sunset Beach, Margaret River Pro, and Surf City El Salvador Pro. He entered the final ranked 2nd in the world rankings and was highly touted locally, as a Californian male had not won a world title since Tom Curren in 1990. The fanfare also included a personal motivational speech from actor Matthew McConaughey, which gained traction on social media. He finished in 3rd place at the final, with the 2nd most overall season points.

After qualifying for the 2024 Paris Olympic Games for his first Olympic Games appearance, he was later eliminated in the third round of the men's shortboard competition, finishing 9th place overall.

For the 2024 season, he won the MEO Rip Curl Pro Portugal and the Corona Fiji Pro, and was runner-up at the Rip Curl Pro Bells Beach. This led him to finish the season 3rd overall in points and qualify for the 2024 World Surf League Finals. He finished in 3rd place at the final.

In 2025, Colapinto was the runner-up at the Margaret River Pro, Rio Pro, and Tahiti Pro. He finished as runner-up at the 2025 World Surf League Finals.

== Career victories ==
WCT Wins
Year	Event	Venue	Country
2026	MEO Rip Curl Pro Portugal	Supertubos, Peniche	Portugal
2024	Corona Fiji Pro	Cloudbreak, Tavarua	Fiji
2024	MEO Rip Curl Pro Portugal	Supertubos, Peniche	Portugal
2023	Surf Ranch Pro	Lemoore, California	United States
2022	Surf City El Salvador Pro	Punta Roca, La Libertad	El Salvador
2022	MEO Portugal Pro	Supertubos, Peniche	Portugal
WSL Challenger Series Wins
Year	Event	Venue	Country
2021	US Open of Surfing Huntington Beach	Huntington Beach, California	United States
Juniors Wins
Year	Event	Venue	Country
2016	Los Cabos Open of Surf	Zippers, San Jose del Cabo	Mexico
2016	Pipe Pro Junior	Banzai Pipeline, Oahu	Hawaii
2015	Junior Men's Vans US Open of Surfing	Huntington Beach, California	United States

== Other work ==
Griffin and his brother Crosby Colapinto post surfing highlights to their YouTube channel, Cola Bros.
