= Jack Robinson (surfer) =

Australian surfer

Personal information
- Born: 27 December 1997 (age 28) Margaret River, Western Australia, Australia
- Height: 5 ft 11 in (180 cm)
- Weight: 178 lb (81 kg)

Surfing career
- Sport: Surfing
- Best year: 2022 - Ranked #3 WSL CT World Tour
- Sponsors: Volcom, Boost Mobile, Dakine, Sun Bum
- Major achievements: 2024 Olympics silver Medal; WSL Championship Tour event wins: 9

Surfing specifications
- Stance: Natural (Regular foot)
Medal record
Men's surfing
Representing Australia
Olympic Games
Silver medal – second place	2024 Paris	Shortboard
World Games
Bronze medal – third place	2024 Arecibo	Team

Jack Robinson (born 27 December 1997) is an Australian professional surfer who competes on the World Surf League Men's Championship Tour. He was crowned surfer of the year twice at the Australian Surfing Awards in 2020 and 2021. Robinson is often considered to one of the best barrel riders of the current days. Robinson did his best WSL performance in 2022 where he finished 3rd on the final rankings. He qualified for the 2024 Olympic Games, where he won silver.

== Early years and personal life ==
Robinson was born in December 1997 in Perth, Western Australia to parents Mersina Stratos and Trevor Robinson. He began surfing at age three. By the age of six, he moved with his family to Margaret River, Western Australia.

By age 11, Robinson was surfing eight-to-10 foot "second reef" waves at Banzai Pipeline in Hawaii. In 2010, Robinson was featured on the cover of The Weekend Australian Magazine and was described as a potential future Kelly Slater.

In 2020, he married Julia Muniz, a Brazilian professional model from Espirito Santo, Brazil, in an intimate garden ceremony held in Margaret River.

In 2023, the couple announced that Muniz was pregnant with their first child.

== Surfing career ==
In 2012, by age 14, Robinson ranked #1 on Surfer Magazine’s annual Hot 100 junior list. Robinson won the North Shore Surf Shop Pro Junior in 2014 at the Men's Junior Tour. The same year, he signed a contract with Billabong that lasted for 5 years till he signed with Volcom in 2019.

In 2018, Robinson won the WSL Qualifying Series Men’s Heroes de Mayo Iquique Pro in Chile. In February 2019, Robinson won the 2019 Volcom Pipe Pro.

Robinson received a wild card at the 2019 Margaret river pro event held between 29 May to 4 June 2019 where he secured a 9.30 and 9.27 combo to defeat Brazilian surfer Filipe Toledo.

In December 2019, Robinson won the Vans World Cup of Surfing at Sunset Beach at the final event of the Qualifying Series Men’s and qualified for the 2020 World Surf League (WSL) Men's Championship Tour (CT).

Robinson won his first Championship Tour event in 2021 at the Corona Open Mexico event presented by Quiksilver.

Robinson won his second and third Championship Tour event back to back in 2022 at his hometown event in the Margaret River Pro in Australia followed by a victory at G-Land, Banyuwangi (Indonesia). Since then, he's also achieved Championship Tour victories at the Billabong Pro Pipeline and SHISEIDO Tahiti Pro in 2023

In the 2024 season, Jack started very well, winning the second stage of the year, the Hurley Pro Sunset Beach in Hawaii, defeating Kanoa Igarashi, he also won the Margaret River Pro for the second time in his career.

Jack competed in the Paris Olympic Games, having a great campaign, beating John John Florence in the round of 16, Ethan Ewing in the quarter-finals, the three-time world champion Gabriel Medina in the semi-finals until reaching the Olympic final. In the gold medal match Jack had a 7.83 on his first wave, but saw Kauli Vaast making two excellent waves, with the sea getting weak, Jack didn't have his second wave. He lost the final but achieved Australia's second Olympic medal in surfing, winning the silver medal.

Jack placed 3rd in the regular season and made his second appearance at the 2024 WSL Finals, losing to Ítalo Ferreira and finishing the season in 4th place.

== Career Victories ==
WCT Wins
Year	Event	Venue	Country
2025	Lexus Tahiti Pro	Teahupo'o, Tahiti	French Polynesia
2025	Rip Curl Pro Bells Beach	Bells Beach, Victoria	Australia
2024	Margaret River Pro	Margaret River, Western Australia	Australia
2024	Hurley Pro Sunset Beach	Sunset Beach, Oahu	Hawaii
2023	SHISEIDO Tahiti Pro	Teahupo'o, Tahiti	French Polynesia
2023	Billabong Pro Pipeline	Banzai Pipeline, Oahu	Hawaii
2022	Quiksilver/ROXY Pro G-Land	G-Land, Banyuwangi	Indonesia
2022	Margaret River Pro	Margaret River, Western Australia	Australia
2021	Corona Open Mexico	Barra de La Cruz, Oaxaca	Mexico
WQS Wins
Year	Event	Venue	Country
2019	Vans World Cup of Surfing	Sunset Beach, Oahu	Hawaii
2019	Volcom Pipe Pro	Banzai Pipeline, Oahu	Hawaii
2018	Heroes de Mayo Iquique Pro	La Punta, Iquique	Chile
2017	Sunset Open	Sunset Beach, Oahu	Hawaii
Juniors Wins
Year	Event	Venue	Country
2014	North Shore Surf Shop Pro Junior	Sunset Beach, Oahu	Hawaii
