= Supertubos =

Wave and beach located in Peniche, Portugal

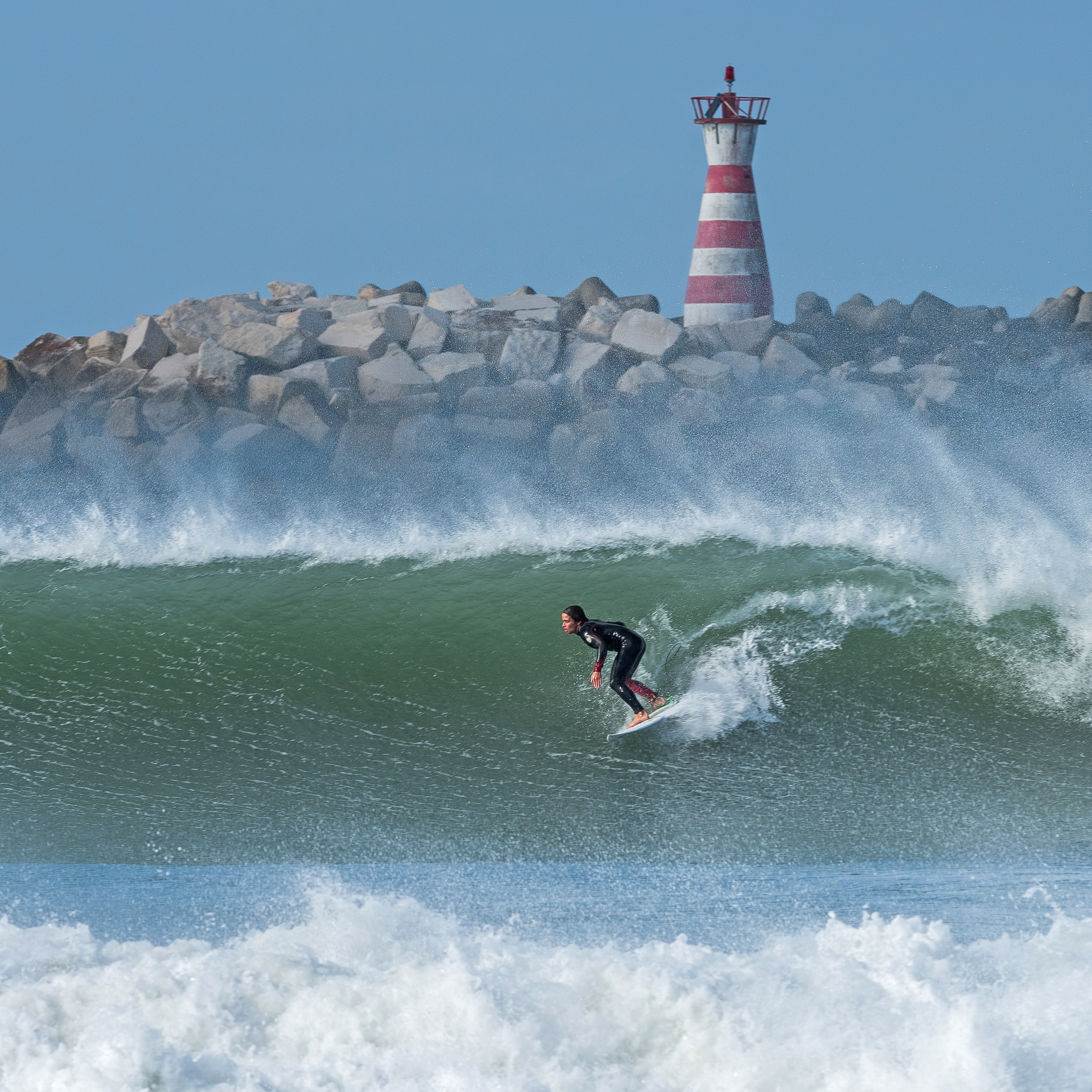
A surfer catching a wave at Supertubos beach.

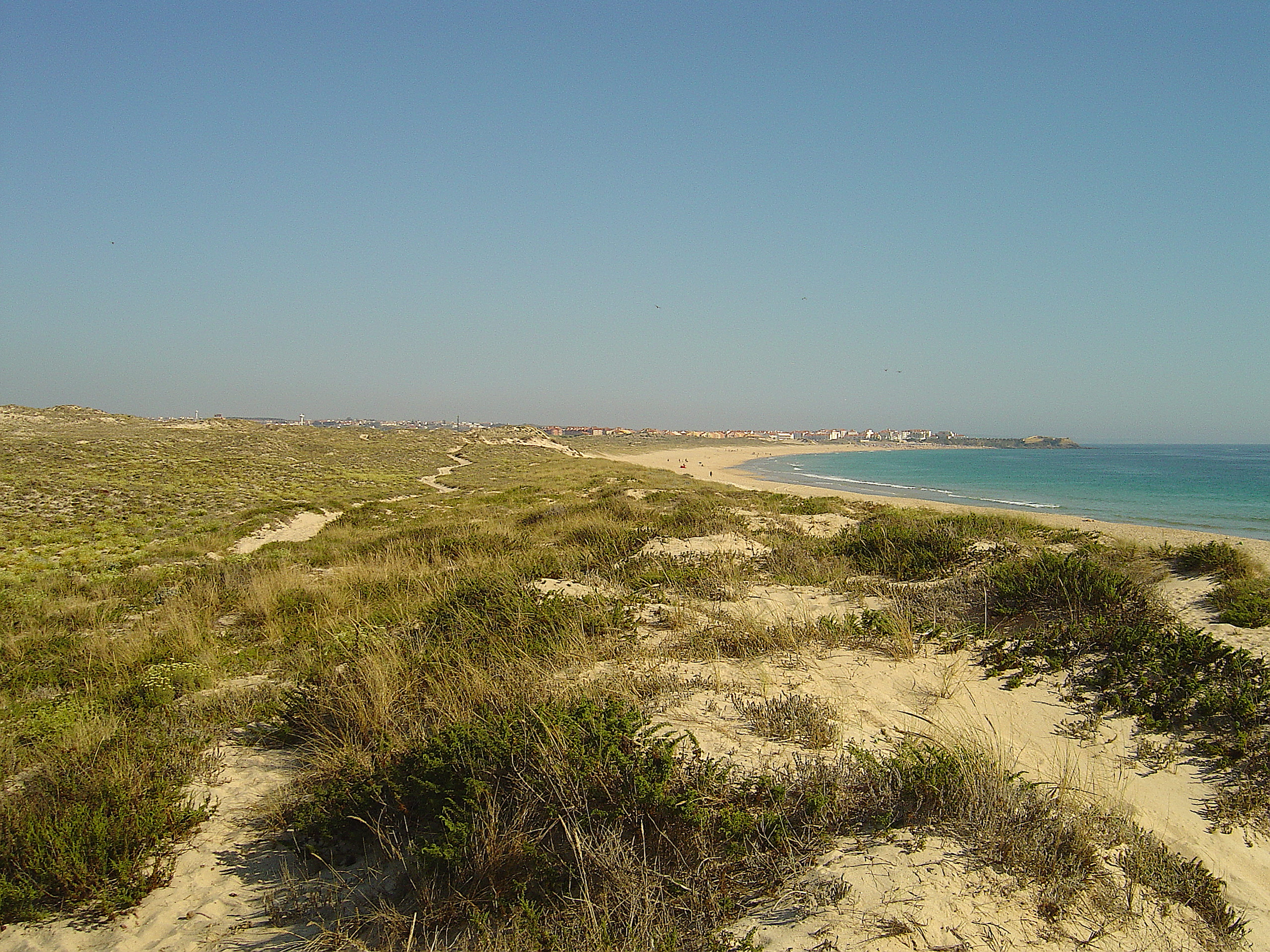
Side view of the beach.

Supertubos (Portuguese for Supertubes) is a wave and beach located in Peniche, Portugal. The break is the site of the MEO Pro Portugal from the World Surf League Men's and Women's Championship Tour event.

The wave did not come into mainstream international spotlight until the Rip Curl Pro Search Event in 2009. It has been qualified as having 'Totally Epic' quality as a wave.

== Major surfing competitions ==
The beach hosts every year the MEO Rip Curl Pro Portugal, a professional surfing competition, from the World Surf League Men's and Women's Championship Tour. On the tour calendar, this is one of the rare European competitions held every season.

At national level, the beach hosts every year the "Bom Petisco Peniche Pro" from the Liga MEO Surf Men's and Women's Championship Tour, the last competition of the national championship calendar.

== See also ==
- List of beaches in Portugal
- Praia do Norte (Nazaré)
