= Surfing at the 2024 Summer Olympics =

Surfing at the Games of the XXXIII Olympiad
- Venue: Teahupoʻo reef pass, Tahiti, French Polynesia
- Dates: 27 July – 5 August 2024
- No. of events: 2 (1 men, 1 women)
- Competitors: 48 from 21 nations

Surfing at the 2024 Summer Olympics took place 27 July – 5 August 2024 in Teahupoʻo reef pass, Tahiti, French Polynesia, breaking the record for the farthest away a medal competition has been staged from the host city. A total of 48 surfers (24 for the men's and women's competitions each) competed in the shortboard events, eight more than in Tokyo 2020.

== Venue ==
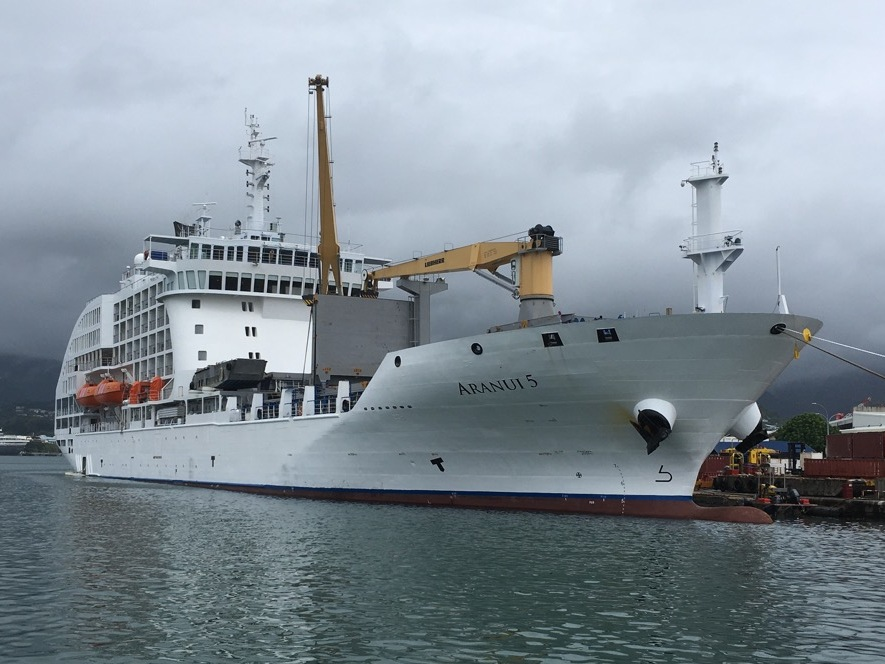
The Aranui 5 cruise ship served as the village for the surfers.

The surfing competition was staged in Teahupo'o, Tahiti, in the French overseas collectivity of French Polynesia in the southern Pacific. The decision was made to hold the surfing competition in the French territory instead of continental Europe because of the famous massive waves on the island suitable for the surfing competitions. Tahiti is 15,000 km (9,300 miles) from Paris, setting a new record for greatest physical distance of a medal event from the host city, a record that was last set in 1956 when the equestrian events of the 1956 Summer Olympics in Melbourne, Australia, had to be held in Stockholm, Sweden, because Australia had strict quarantine rules for animals coming from overseas.

Participants in the surf competitions were the only ones not staying at the Paris Olympic Village on L'Île-Saint-Denis, and stayed instead on the ship M/V Aranui 5 anchored off Tahiti as the first floating Olympic village. The surfing competition was also the only event held without spectators.

== Qualification ==
The qualification system for Paris 2024 built on the previous format used for Tokyo 2020, ensuring the participation of the world's best professional surfers, along with the vast promotion of geographical universal opportunities for surfers around the world at the Games. While the quota of two male and two female surfers per country remains intact, two exceptions to this rule have been introduced for the ISA World Surfing Games 2022 and 2024 team champions. These exceptions may increase the quota for some teams to three surfers.

== Competition schedule ==
Legend
R1	Round 1	R2	Round 2	R3	Round 3	¼	Quarter-finals	½	Semi-finals	F	Final

Revised schedule
Event ↓ / Date →	Sat 27	Sun 28	Mon 29	Tue 30	Wed 31	Thu 1	Fri 2	Sat 3	Sun 4	Mon 5	
Men's shortboard	R1	R2	R3	Postponed		¼		Postponed		½	F
Women's shortboard	R1	R2		Postponed		R3	¼	Postponed		½	F

On 29 July, the weather turned dangerous towards the end of round 3 of the men's shortboard event, forcing the postponement of the women's third round. The waves continued to be too rough for competition over the next two days, leading to the last women's round and all finals being postponed. Surfing resumed on 1 August. Competition was again called off on 3 and 4 August, with the semifinals and finals tentatively set for 5 August.

== Participating nations ==
A total of 48 surfers from 21 nations qualified. Canada and Mexico made their Olympic debuts in the sport.

- Australia (4)
- Brazil (6)
- Canada (1)
- China (1)
- Costa Rica (1)
- El Salvador (1)
- France (4) Host
- Germany (2)
- Indonesia (1)
- Israel (1)
- Italy (1)
- Japan (4)
- Mexico (1)
- Morocco (1)
- New Zealand (2)
- Nicaragua (1)
- Peru (3)
- Portugal (2)
- South Africa (3)
- Spain (3)
- United States (5)

== Participating athletes ==
=== Men's shortboard ===
- (Japan) Connor O'Leary
- (Australia) Ethan Ewing
- (Australia) Jack Robinson
- (Brazil) Filipe Toledo
- (Brazil) João Chianca
- (Italy) Leonardo Fioravanti
- (Japan) Kanoa Igarashi
- (South Africa) Matthew McGillivray
- (South Africa) Jordy Smith
- (United States) Griffin Colapinto
- (United States) John John Florence
- (Japan) Reo Inaba
- (France) Kauli Vaast
- (New Zealand) Billy Stairmand
- (Peru) Lucca Mesinas
- (Mexico) Alan Cleland Jr.
- (Brazil) Gabriel Medina
- (France) Joan Duru
- (Germany) Tim Elter
- (Indonesia) Rio Waida
- (Morocco) Ramzi Boukhiam
- (Peru) Alonso Correa
- (Spain) Andy Criere
- (El Salvador) Bryan Pérez

=== Women's shortboard ===
- (United States) Caitlin Simmers
- (Australia) Tyler Wright
- (Australia) Molly Picklum
- (Brazil) Tatiana Weston-Webb
- (Costa Rica) Brisa Hennessy
- (France) Johanne Defay
- (Portugal) Teresa Bonvalot
- (United States) Carissa Moore
- (United States) Caroline Marks
- (South Africa) Sarah Baum
- (Japan) Shino Matsuda
- (France) Vahiné Fierro
- (New Zealand) Saffi Vette
- (Canada) Sanoa Dempfle-Olin
- (Brazil) Luana Silva
- (Brazil) Tainá Hinckel
- (China) Yang Siqi
- (Germany) Camilla Kemp
- (Israel) Anat Lelior
- (Peru) Sol Aguirre
- (Portugal) Yolanda Sequeira
- (Spain) Nadia Erostarbe
- (Spain) Janire González
- (Nicaragua) Candelaria Resano

== Medal summary ==
=== Medal table ===
* Host nation (France)

Rank	NOC	Gold	Silver	Bronze	Total
1	France*	1	0	1	2
2	United States	1	0	0	1
3	Brazil	0	1	1	2
4	Australia	0	1	0	1
Totals (4 entries)		2	2	2	6

=== Medalists ===
Event	Gold	Silver	Bronze
Men's shortboard	Kauli Vaast; France	Jack Robinson; Australia	Gabriel Medina; Brazil
Women's shortboard	Caroline Marks; United States	Tatiana Weston-Webb; Brazil	Johanne Defay; France

== See also ==
- Surfing at the 2020 Summer Olympics
- Surfing at the 2023 Pan American Games
