= Surfing at the 2024 Summer Olympics – Qualification =

This article details the qualifying phase for surfing at the 2024 Summer Olympics. The competition at these Games will comprise a total of 48 surfers coming from their respective National Olympic Committees (NOCs) with a maximum of two to three per gender. All athletes must undergo a qualifying pathway to earn a spot for the Games through three successive editions of the ISA World Surfing Games, the World Surf League Championship Tour, and the Pan American Games.

Host nation France has been entitled to use a single quota place each in both men's and women's shortboards. If one or more French surfers directly qualify through any of the tournaments, the host country place(s) shall be reallocated to the next highest-ranked eligible surfer at the 2024 ISA World Surfing Games. For the first time, the International Olympic Committee invites all interested and eligible NOCs to send surfers to the Games under the Universality rule. To be registered for a spot granted by the Universality principle, an eligible surfer must finish among the top 50 in his or her respective shortboard event at the 2023 or 2024 ISA World Surfing Games.

== Summary ==
Quota places will be distributed to the eligible surfers at the following events based on the hierarchical structure:

- Host country – As the host country, France reserves one quota place each for the men's and women's shortboard events. If one or more French surfers qualify regularly and directly, their slots will be reallocated to the next highest-ranked eligible surfers from the 2024 ISA World Surfing Games.
- 2022 ISA World Surfing Games – The winning teams by gender will secure one place for their respective NOC, regardless of the two-per-country quota limit.
- 2023 World Surf League Championship Tour – The top ten men and top eight women eligible for qualification will each be awarded a quota place.
- 2023 Pan American Games (continental qualification for America) – The gold medalist of each shortboard event will be entitled to a spot for the Olympics; otherwise, it will be reallocated to the next highest-ranked surfer in the same tournament.
- 2023 ISA World Surfing Games (continental qualification for Africa, Asia, Europe and Oceania) – The highest-ranked eligible male and female surfer from Africa, Asia, Europe and Oceania will be entitled to a spot for the Olympics; otherwise, it will be reallocated to the next highest-ranked surfer on the continent. The highest-ranked athlete (or next highest-ranked athlete if reallocation) must achieve a top-30 placings at this event; otherwise, it will be reallocated to the next highest-ranked eligible athlete, not yet qualified, regardless of continent.
- 2024 ISA World Surfing Games:
  - The winning teams by gender will secure one place for their respective NOC, regardless of the two-per-country quota limit.
  - The top five men and top seven women eligible for qualification will each be awarded a quota place.
- Universality place – For the first time, an additional place per gender will be entitled to eligible NOCs interested to have their surfers compete in Paris 2024. To be registered for a spot granted by the Universality principle, the athlete must finish among the top 50 in his or her respective shortboard event at the 2023 or 2024 ISA World Surfing Games.

=== Qualified countries ===
NOC	Men	Women	Total
Australia	2	2	4
Brazil	3	3	6
Canada	0	1	1
China	0	1	1
Costa Rica	0	1	1
El Salvador	1	0	1
France	2	2	4
Germany	1	1	2
Indonesia	1	0	1
Israel	0	1	1
Italy	1	0	1
Japan	3	1	4
Mexico	1	0	1
Morocco	1	0	1
New Zealand	1	1	2
Nicaragua	0	1	1
Peru	2	1	3
Portugal	0	2	2
South Africa	2	1	3
Spain	1	2	3
United States	2	3	5
Total: 21 NOCs	24	24	48

== Timeline ==
Event	Date	Venue
2022 ISA World Surfing Games	September 16–24, 2022	(United States) Huntington Beach
2023 World Surf League	January – September 2023	Various locations
2023 ISA World Surfing Games	May 30 – June 7, 2023	(El Salvador) El Sunzal & La Bocana
2023 Pan American Games	October 24–30, 2023	(Chile) Punta de Lobos
2024 ISA World Surfing Games	February 22 – March 2, 2024	(Puerto Rico) Arecibo
Reallocation of unused quota places	June 2024	—

== Events ==
=== Men's shortboard ===
Event	Places	Qualified surfer
2022 ISA World Surfing Games (Team Quota)	1	Connor O'Leary (JPN)
2023 World Surf League	10	Ethan Ewing (AUS); Jack Robinson (AUS); Filipe Toledo (BRA); João Chianca (BRA); Leonardo Fioravanti (ITA); Kanoa Igarashi (JPN); Matthew McGillivray (RSA); Jordy Smith (RSA); Griffin Colapinto (USA); John John Florence (USA)
2023 ISA World Surfing Games – Africa	—	— (Note: Since Jordy Smith of South Africa qualified via the 2023 World Surf League and since Teva Bouchgua of Morocco (the second-highest finisher from Africa) failed to achieve a top 30 placing in this event, the Africa continental quota will be reallocated to the next highest-ranked eligible athlete, not yet qualified, regardless of continent, in this case it would be Alan Cleland of Mexico, as the champion of the men's event.)
2023 ISA World Surfing Games – Asia	1	Reo Inaba (JPN) (Note: Since Kanoa Igarashi of Japan qualified via 2023 World Surf League, the Asia continental quota will be taken by Reo Inaba of Japan, as the second-highest finisher from Asia.)
2023 ISA World Surfing Games – Europe	1	Kauli Vaast (FRA)
2023 ISA World Surfing Games – Oceania	1	Billy Stairmand (NZL)
2023 Pan American Games	1	Lucca Mesinas (PER)
Reallocation of continental quota	1	Alan Cleland (MEX)
2024 ISA World Surfing Games (Team Quota)	1	Gabriel Medina (BRA)
2024 ISA World Surfing Games (Individual Place and Host Country Reallocated Quota)	6	Joan Duru (FRA); Tim Elter (GER); Rio Waida (INA); Ramzi Boukhiam (MAR); Alonso Correa (PER); Andy Criere (ESP)
Universality place	1	Bryan Pérez (ESA)
Total	24	

=== Women's shortboard ===
Event	Places	Qualified surfer
2022 ISA World Surfing Games (Team Quota)	1	Caitlin Simmers (USA)
2023 World Surf League	8	Tyler Wright (AUS); Molly Picklum (AUS); Tatiana Weston-Webb (BRA); Brisa Hennessy (CRC); Johanne Defay (FRA); Teresa Bonvalot (POR); Carissa Moore (USA); Caroline Marks (USA)
2023 ISA World Surfing Games – Africa	1	Sarah Baum (RSA)
2023 ISA World Surfing Games – Asia	1	Shino Matsuda (JPN)
2023 ISA World Surfing Games – Europe	1	Vahiné Fierro (FRA)
2023 ISA World Surfing Games – Oceania	1	Saffi Vette (NZL)
2023 Pan American Games	1	Sanoa Dempfle-Olin (CAN) (Note: Since gold medalist Tatiana Weston-Webb of Brazil qualified via 2023 World Surf League, the American quota will be taken by Sanoa Dempfle-Olin of Canada, as the second-highest finisher.)
2024 ISA World Surfing Games (Team Quota)	1	Luana Silva (BRA)
2024 ISA World Surfing Games (Individual Place and Host Country Reallocated Quota)	8	Tainá Hinckel (BRA); Yang Siqi (CHN); Camilla Kemp (GER); Anat Lelior (ISR); Sol Aguirre (PER); Yolanda Sequeira (POR); Nadia Erostarbe (ESP); Janire González (ESP)
Universality place	1	Candelaria Resano (NCA)
Total	24	
