= Surfing at the 2024 Summer Olympics – Men's shortboard =

Men's shortboard at the Games of the XXXIII Olympiad
- Olympic surfing
- Venue: Teahupo'o reef pass, Tahiti
- Dates: 27 July – 5 August 2024
- Competitors: 24 from 15 nations

Medalists
1st place, gold medalist(s)		Kauli Vaast	France
2nd place, silver medalist(s)		Jack Robinson	Australia
3rd place, bronze medalist(s)		Gabriel Medina	Brazil

The men's shortboard competition at the 2024 Summer Olympics in Paris was held from 25 July to 5 August at the Teahupo'o reef pass, Tahiti, a French overseas territory in the French Polynesia, located more than 9,320 miles (14,999 km) from Paris.

== Qualification ==
The 24 quota places per gender were distributed to the eligible surfers at the following events based on the hierarchical structure:

- Host country – As the host country, France reserves one quota place each for the men's and women's shortboard events. If one or more French surfers qualify regularly and directly, their slots will be reallocated to the next highest-ranked eligible surfers from the 2024 ISA World Surfing Games.
- 2022 ISA World Surfing Games – The winning teams by gender will secure one place for their respective NOC, regardless of the two-per-country quota limit.
- 2023 World Surf League Championship Tour – The top ten men and top eight women eligible for qualification will each be awarded a quota place.
- 2023 Pan American Games (continental qualification for America) – The gold medalist of each shortboard event will be entitled to a spot for the Olympics; otherwise, it will be reallocated to the next highest-ranked surfer in the same tournament.
- 2023 ISA World Surfing Games (continental qualification for Africa, Asia, Europe and Oceania) – The highest-ranked eligible male and female surfer from Africa, Asia, Europe and Oceania will be entitled to a spot for the Olympics; otherwise, it will be reallocated to the next highest-ranked surfer on the continent. The highest-ranked athlete (or next highest-ranked athlete if reallocation) must achieve a top-30 placings at this event; otherwise, it will be reallocated to the next highest-ranked eligible athlete, not yet qualified, regardless of continent.
- 2024 ISA World Surfing Games:
  - The winning teams by gender will secure one place for their respective NOC, regardless of the two-per-country quota limit.
  - The top five men and top seven women eligible for qualification will each be awarded a quota place.
- Universality place – For the first time, an additional place per gender will be entitled to eligible NOCs interested to have their surfers compete in Paris 2024. To be registered for a spot granted by the Universality principle, the athlete must finish among the top 50 in his or her respective shortboard event at the 2023 or 2024 ISA World Surfing Games.

== Competition format ==
The competition consists of six rounds:

- Round 1: 8 heats of 3 surfers each; the top in each heat (8 total) advance to round 3 while the other 2 from each heat (16 total) go to round 2 (essentially a repechage).

From round 2 onwards, all rounds are elimination rounds and the heats consists of two surfers, with the top surfer progressing to the next round and the second place being eliminated.

- Round 2: Head-to-head competition starts with this round, 8 heats of 2 surfers each; the top in each heat (8 total) advance to round 3 while the other in each heat (8 total) is eliminated.
- Round 3: 8 heats of 2 surfers each; winner advances, loser eliminated
- Quarterfinals: 4 heats of 2 surfers each; winner advances, loser eliminated
- Semifinals: 2 heats of 2 surfers each; winner advances to final, loser advances to third place heat
- Final and bronze medal match

The length of each heat (25 to 40 minutes) and the number of waves each surfer can ride (maximum 25) are determined by the technical director ahead of the day of competition. Scoring for each wave is from 0.1 to 10, with the best two waves for each surfer counting. Scores are based on the difficulty of manoeuvres performed, innovation and progression, variety, combination, speed, power, and flow of each manoeuvre.

=== Judges ===
The competition is judged by two head judges, two priority judges, and seven regular judges.

- Ian Buchanan, priority judge (NZL)
- Luiz Dantas (BRA)
- Tatsuya Fukagawa (JPN)
- Tory Gilkerson (USA)
- Daniel Kosoof (NZL)
- Benjamin Lowe (AUS)
- Marcel Miranda, priority judge (BRA)
- Luiz Pereira, head judge (BRA)
- Richard Pierce Jr., head judge (USA)
- Thierry Vidal (FRA)
- Mikel Zalacain (ESP)

After Australian surfing judge Benjamin Lowe posted a picture on social media of himself posing with Australian competitor Ethan Ewing and his coach Bede Durbidge, Lowe was removed from the judging panel by the International Surfing Association on August 1.

== Schedule ==
H	Heats	QF	Quarter-Finals	SF	Semi-Finals	F	Finals

Original schedule
Date	27 Jul	28 Jul	29 July	30 Jul		
Men's	R1	R2	R3	QF	SF	F
Women's	R1	R2	R3	QF	SF	F

Competition was originally set to take place over 4 days between 27 and 30 July, with a contingency period of 5 days between 31 July and 5 August, if necessary.

On 29 July, the weather turned dangerous towards the end of round 3 of the men's shortboard event, forcing the cancellation of the women's third round. The waves continued to be too rough for competition over the next two days, leaving the final women's round 3 and all finals re-scheduled for 1 and 3 August (a lack of contestable conditions was also expected for 2 August).

Competition was again called off on 3 and 4 August, with the semifinals and finals tentatively set for 5 August.

All times are local, PFT (UTC−10)

Round	Original dates	Revised dates	Original times	Revised times
Round 1	Saturday, 27 July 2024	—N/a	11:48	—N/a
Round 2	Sunday, 28 July 2024	—N/a	11:48	—N/a
Round 3 (round of 16)	Monday, 29 July 2024	—N/a	7:00	—N/a
Quarter-finals	Tuesday, 30 July 2024	Thursday, 1 August 2024	7:00	11:48
Semi-finals; Bronze medal match Gold medal match	Tuesday, 30 July 2024	Monday, 5 August 2024	11:48; 14:12; 15:34	10:30; 12:54; 14:16

== Pre-competition seeding ==
Surfers were pre-seeded according to their final ranking in the 2024 ISA World Surfing Games.

1. Gabriel Medina (BRA) (bronze medalist)
2. Ramzi Boukhiam (MAR) (round 3)
3. Kauli Vaast (FRA) (gold medalist)
4. Joan Duru (FRA) (QF)
5. Alonso Correa (PER) (4th place)
6. Andy Criere (ESP) (round 2)
7. Rio Waida (INA) (round 2)
8. Ethan Ewing (AUS) (QF)
9. Tim Elter (GER) (round 2)
10. Leonardo Fioravanti (ITA) (round 2)
11. John John Florence (USA) (round 3)
12. Filipe Toledo (BRA) (round 3)
13. Jack Robinson (AUS) (silver medalist)
14. Lucca Mesinas (PER) (round 2)
15. Billy Stairmand (NZL) (round 2)
16. Connor O'Leary (JPN) (round 3)
17. Jordy Smith (RSA) (round 3)
18. Reo Inaba (JPN) (QF)
19. Alan Cleland (MEX) (round 3)
20. Kanoa Igarashi (JPN) (round 3)
21. Matthew McGillivray (RSA) (round 2)
22. Griffin Colapinto (USA) (round 3)
23. João Chianca (BRA) (QF)
24. Bryan Pérez (ESA) (round 2)

== Results ==
=== Round 1 ===
The first round is non-elimination. Surfers were seeded into eight heats of three surfers each, with the top surfer advancing straight to Round 3. The bottom two surfers were seeded into Round 2, the first elimination round.

==== Heat 1 ====
Rank	Surfer	Nation	Waves				Total score	Notes
Rank	Surfer	Nation	1	2	3	4	Total score	Notes
1	Ethan Ewing [8]	Australia	7.33	2.57			9.90	R3
2	Jordy Smith [17]	South Africa	5.17	0.93	2.43		7.60	R2
3	Tim Elter [9]	Germany	1.00	0.50	3.00	1.00	4.00	R2

==== Heat 2 ====
Rank	Surfer	Nation	Waves					Total score	Notes
Rank	Surfer	Nation	1	2	3	4	5	Total score	Notes
1	Joan Duru [4]	France	6.17	2.83	4.67	4.33	7.67	13.84	R3
2	Jack Robinson [13]	Australia	6.83	6.53	5.73	1.40		13.36	R2
3	Matthew McGillivray [21]	South Africa	1.33	0.73	1.93	3.33	1.07	5.26	R2

==== Heat 3 ====
Rank	Surfer	Nation	Waves			Total score	Notes
Rank	Surfer	Nation	1	2	3	Total score	Notes
1	Alonso Correa [5]	Peru	5.83	3.17	8.50	14.33	R3
2	Filipe Toledo [12]	Brazil	0.93	1.40	6.23	7.63	R2
3	Kanoa Igarashi [20]	Japan	4.17			4.17	R2

==== Heat 4 ====
Rank	Surfer	Nation	Waves					Total score	Notes
Rank	Surfer	Nation	1	2	3	4	5	Total score	Notes
1	Gabriel Medina [1]	Brazil	1.00	0.50	6.17	7.17	6.33	13.50	R3
2	Connor O'Leary [16]	Japan	0.20	3.73	6.20			9.93	R2
3	Bryan Pérez [24]	El Salvador	1.20	3.50	3.17	4.03	2.60	7.53	R2

==== Heat 5 ====
Rank	Surfer	Nation	Waves							Total score	Notes
Rank	Surfer	Nation	1	2	3	4	5	6	7	Total score	Notes
1	João Chianca [23]	Brazil	1.13	0.50	5.67	4.40	0.50	3.57	1.10	10.07	R3
2	Ramzi Boukhiam [2]	Morocco	0.23	0.77	0.23	4.83	3.03	4.93		9.76	R2
3	Billy Stairmand [15]	New Zealand	1.13	3.33	2.20	0.97				5.53	R2

==== Heat 6 ====
Rank	Surfer	Nation	Waves							Total score	Notes
Rank	Surfer	Nation	1	2	3	4	5	6	7	Total score	Notes
1	John John Florence [11]	United States	6.33	5.67	8.00	1.50	9.33	1.37	5.67	17.33	R3
2	Alan Cleland [19]	Mexico	7.17	7.17						14.34	R2
3	Andy Criere [6]	Spain	3.50	1.00	8.50					12.00	R2

==== Heat 7 ====
Rank	Surfer	Nation	Waves					Total score	Notes
Rank	Surfer	Nation	1	2	3	4	5	Total score	Notes
1	Griffin Colapinto [22]	United States	7.50	0.50	5.77	9.53	1.00	17.03	R3
2	Kauli Vaast [3]	France	1.50	4.60	5.83	7.80		13.63	R2
3	Lucca Mesinas [14]	Peru	1.00	6.00	4.33	5.10		11.10	R2

==== Heat 8 ====
Rank	Surfer	Nation	Waves				Total score	Notes
Rank	Surfer	Nation	1	2	3	4	Total score	Notes
1	Reo Inaba [18]	Japan	7.33	5.43	0.37	0.43	12.76	R3
2	Leonardo Fioravanti [10]	Italy	4.17	4.70			8.87	R2
3	Rio Waida [7]	Indonesia	5.17	0.57			5.74	R2

=== Round 2 ===
In the second round surfers were seeded into eight heats of two surfers each, with the top surfer advancing to Round 3 (round of 16) and the second place being eliminated.

The pairs in each heat were formed based on surfers' results in the round 1 and according to their pre-competition (PC) seeding, with the second places facing the third places:

- Heat 1: 2nd in Round 1, 3rd best PC seeding v 3rd in Round 1, 6th best PC seeding
- Heat 2: 2nd in Round 1, 6th best PC seeding v 3rd in Round 1, 3rd best PC seeding
- Heat 3: 2nd in Round 1, 7th best PC seeding v 3rd in Round 1, 2nd best PC seeding
- Heat 4: 2nd in Round 1, 2nd best PC seeding v 3rd in Round 1, 7th best PC seeding
- Heat 5: 2nd in Round 1, Best PC seeding v 3rd in Round 1, 8th best PC seeding
- Heat 6: 2nd in Round 1, 8th best PC seeding v 3rd in Round 1, Best PC seeding
- Heat 7: 2nd in Round 1, 5th best PC seeding v 3rd in Round 1, 4th best PC seeding
- Heat 8: 2nd in Round 1, 4th best PC seeding v 3rd in Round 1, 5th best PC seeding

==== Heat 1 ====
Rank	Surfer	Nation	Waves						Total score	Notes
Rank	Surfer	Nation	1	2	3	4	5	6	Total score	Notes
1	Kanoa Igarashi [20]	Japan	7.17	3.67	0.70	6.00	0.43	6.70	13.87	R3
2	Leonardo Fioravanti [10]	Italy	0.93	1.33	0.70	5.67			7.00	E

==== Heat 2 ====
Rank	Surfer	Nation	Waves			Total score	Notes
Rank	Surfer	Nation	1	2	3	Total score	Notes
1	Connor O'Leary [16]	Japan	7.33	7.17	0.50	14.50	R3
2	Tim Elter [9]	Germany	1.57	0.93	4.50	6.07	E

==== Heat 3 ====
Rank	Surfer	Nation	Waves							Total score	Notes
Rank	Surfer	Nation	1	2	3	4	5	6	7	Total score	Notes
1	Jordy Smith [17]	South Africa	5.50	2.17	2.33	4.00	0.43	3.53	0.27	9.50	R3
2	Rio Waida [7]	Indonesia	4.67	0.20	0.73					5.40	E

==== Heat 4 ====
Rank	Surfer	Nation	Waves					Total score	Notes
Rank	Surfer	Nation	1	2	3	4	5	Total score	Notes
1	Kauli Vaast [3]	France	4.17	7.50	5.67	1.00	6.53	14.03	R3
2	Matthew McGillivray [21]	South Africa	3.50	7.17	0.73	0.60		10.67	E

==== Heat 5 ====
Rank	Surfer	Nation	Waves								Total score	Notes
Rank	Surfer	Nation	1	2	3	4	5	6	7	8	Total score	Notes
1	Ramzi Boukhiam [2]	Morocco	5.00	0.50	1.43	0.50	7.00	3.33	0.13	7.60	14.60	R3
2	Bryan Pérez [24]	El Salvador	6.17	1.23	0.40	0.50	1.63	5.30	6.43		12.60	E

==== Heat 6 ====
Rank	Surfer	Nation	Waves							Total score	Notes
Rank	Surfer	Nation	1	2	3	4	5	6	7	Total score	Notes
1	Alan Cleland [19]	Mexico	4.50	1.83	1.77	8.50	1.00	3.00	6.67	15.17	R3
2	Andy Criere [6]	Spain	2.50	1.93	1.00	0.73	1.07	1.23		4.43	E

==== Heat 7 ====
Rank	Surfer	Nation	Waves		Total score	Notes
Rank	Surfer	Nation	1	2	Total score	Notes
1	Jack Robinson [13]	Australia	9.87	7.00	16.87	R3
2	Lucca Mesinas [14]	Peru	6.00	4.83	10.83	E

==== Heat 8 ====
Rank	Surfer	Nation	Waves					Total score	Notes
Rank	Surfer	Nation	1	2	3	4	5	Total score	Notes
1	Filipe Toledo [12]	Brazil	7.33	0.43	2.17	9.67	6.33	17.00	R3
2	Billy Stairmand [15]	New Zealand	8.17	5.83				14.00	E

=== Bracket ===
The bracket was determined based on the seeding made for round 3 (round of 16). The winner from each head-to-head heat qualified to the next round.

Round 3; 29 July
5	Alonso Correa (PER)	15.00
17	Jordy Smith (RSA)	12.20
18	Reo Inaba (JPN)	6.00
12	Filipe Toledo (BRA)	2.46
22	Griffin Colapinto (USA)	13.83
3	Kauli Vaast (FRA)	15.10
4	Joan Duru (FRA)	18.13
19	Alan Cleland (MEX)	15.17
1	Gabriel Medina (BRA)	17.40
20	Kanoa Igarashi (JPN)	7.04
23	João Chianca (BRA)	18.10
2	Ramzi Boukhiam (MAR)	17.80
11	John John Florence (USA)	9.07
13	Jack Robinson (AUS)	13.94
8	Ethan Ewing (AUS)	14.17
16	Connor O'Leary (JPN)	11.00

Quarter-finals; 1 August
5	Alonso Correa (PER)	10.50
18	Reo Inaba (JPN)	10.16
3	Kauli Vaast (FRA)	15.33
4	Joan Duru (FRA)	12.33
1	Gabriel Medina (BRA)	14.77
23	João Chianca (BRA)	9.33
13	Jack Robinson (AUS)	15.33
8	Ethan Ewing (AUS)	13.00

Semi-finals; 5 August
5	Alonso Correa (PER)	9.60
3	Kauli Vaast (FRA)	10.96
1	Gabriel Medina (BRA)	6.33
13	Jack Robinson (AUS)	12.33

Gold medal heat 5 August
3	(gold) Kauli Vaast (FRA)	17.67
13	(silver) Jack Robinson (AUS)	7.83
Bronze medal heat 5 August
1	(bronze) Gabriel Medina (BRA)	15.54
5	Alonso Correa (PER)	12.43

=== Round 3 ===
In the third round (round of 16) surfers were also seeded into eight heats of two surfers each, with the top surfer advancing to the quarter-finals and the second place being eliminated.

The pairs in each heat were formed based on surfers' results in the round 1 and according to their pre-competition (PC) seeding, with the second places facing the third places:

- Heat 1: 1st in Round 1, 3rd best PC seeding v Round 2 winners, 6th best PC seeding
- Heat 2: 1st in Round 1, 6th best PC seeding v Round 2 winners, 3rd best PC seeding
- Heat 3: 1st in Round 1, 7th best PC seeding v Round 2 winners, 2nd best PC seeding
- Heat 4: 1st in Round 1, 2nd best PC seeding v Round 2 winners, 7th best PC seeding
- Heat 5: 1st in Round 1, Best PC seeding v Round 2 winners, 8th best PC seeding
- Heat 6: 1st in Round 1, 8th best PC seeding v Round 2 winners, Best PC seeding
- Heat 7: 1st in Round 1, 5th best PC seeding v Round 2 winners, 4th best PC seeding
- Heat 8: 1st in Round 1, 4th best PC seeding v Round 2 winners, 5th best PC seeding

==== Heat 1 ====
Rank	Surfer	Nation	Waves					Total score	Notes
Rank	Surfer	Nation	1	2	3	4	5	Total score	Notes
1	Alonso Correa [5]	Peru	4.83	5.33	8.50	6.50	1.23	15.00	QF
2	Jordy Smith [17]	South Africa	5.90	0.50	0.93	6.30		12.20	E

==== Heat 2 ====
Rank	Surfer	Nation	Waves					Total score	Notes
Rank	Surfer	Nation	1	2	3	4	5	Total score	Notes
1	Reo Inaba [18]	Japan	2.17	3.17	0.50	2.03	2.83	6.00	QF
2	Filipe Toledo [12]	Brazil	1.43	0.97	1.03			2.46	E

==== Heat 3 ====
Rank	Surfer	Nation	Waves			Total score	Notes
Rank	Surfer	Nation	1	2	3	Total score	Notes
1	Kauli Vaast [3]	France	7.33	7.77		15.10	QF
2	Griffin Colapinto [22]	United States	6.33	7.50	5.90	13.83	E

==== Heat 4 ====
Rank	Surfer	Nation	Waves					Total score	Notes
Rank	Surfer	Nation	1	2	3	4	5	Total score	Notes
1	Joan Duru [4]	France	4.67	9.10	4.93	4.00	9.03	18.13	QF
2	Alan Cleland [19]	Mexico	3.17	4.33	7.00	8.17	0,20	15.17	E

==== Heat 5 ====
During Medina's second run, Agence France-Presse photographer Jerome Brouillet captured an image that went viral, showing Medina and his surfboard appearing to hover above the water. His single wave score of 9.90 set an Olympic record.

Rank	Surfer	Nation	Waves						Total score	Notes
Rank	Surfer	Nation	1	2	3	4	5	6	Total score	Notes
1	Gabriel Medina [1]	Brazil	2.50	9.90 OR	5.33	7.50	2.63	7.00	17.40	QF
2	Kanoa Igarashi [20]	Japan	0.73	0.17	3.67	2.77	3.37		7.04	E

==== Heat 6 ====
Rank	Surfer	Nation	Waves						Total score	Notes
Rank	Surfer	Nation	1	2	3	4	5	6	Total score	Notes
1	João Chianca [23]	Brazil	8.33	6.70	8.03	9.30	8.80		18.10	QF
2	Ramzi Boukhiam [2]	Morocco	6.33	7.83	5.17	8.10	9.70	1.27	17.80	E

==== Heat 7 ====
Rank	Surfer	Nation	Waves						Total score	Notes
Rank	Surfer	Nation	1	2	3	4	5	6	Total score	Notes
1	Jack Robinson [13]	Australia	0.17	1.90	7.17	1.83	5.83	6.77	13.94	QF
2	John John Florence [11]	United States	1.17	1.77	6.50	2.57			9.07	E

==== Heat 8 ====
Rank	Surfer	Nation	Waves						Total score	Notes
Rank	Surfer	Nation	1	2	3	4	5	6	Total score	Notes
1	Ethan Ewing [8]	Australia	5.50	1.30	0.20	8.67	1.80		14.17	QF
2	Connor O'Leary [16]	Japan	3.00	0.50	8.00	0.27	0.93	0.23	11.00	E

=== Quarter-finals ===
The men's quarter-finals took place on 1 August 2024.

==== Heat 1 ====
Rank	Surfer	Nation	Waves					Total score	Notes
Rank	Surfer	Nation	1	2	3	4	5	Total score	Notes
1	Alonso Correa [5]	Peru	0.17	2.57	4.17	6.33		10.50	SF
2	Reo Inaba [18]	Japan	2.83	0.47	7.33	0.50	0.33	10.16	E

==== Heat 2 ====
Rank	Surfer	Nation	Waves									Total score	Notes
Rank	Surfer	Nation	1	2	3	4	5	6	7	8	9	Total score	Notes
1	Kauli Vaast [3]	France	1.33	1.07	3.43	6.33	2.00	7.33	8.00	6.83	0.50	15.33	SF
2	Joan Duru [4]	France	3.67	0.77	4.83	7.50						12.33	E

==== Heat 3 ====
Rank	Surfer	Nation	Waves								Total score	Notes
Rank	Surfer	Nation	1	2	3	4	5	6	7	8	Total score	Notes
1	Gabriel Medina [1]	Brazil	6.67	0.50	8.10	1.00					14.77	SF
2	João Chianca [23]	Brazil	0.20	2.33	1.07	0.80	4.83	1.80	4.50	0.47	9.33	E

==== Heat 4 ====
Rank	Surfer	Nation	Waves					Total score	Notes
Rank	Surfer	Nation	1	2	3	4	5	Total score	Notes
1	Jack Robinson [13]	Australia	1.00	0.83	7.33	0.50	8.00	15.33	SF
2	Ethan Ewing [8]	Australia	1.20	8.33	1.57	4.67		13.00	E

=== Semi-finals ===
==== Heat 1 ====
Rank	Surfer	Nation	Waves								Total score	Notes
Rank	Surfer	Nation	1	2	3	4	5	6	7	8	Total score	Notes
1	Kauli Vaast [3]	France	2.00	0.87	4.00	5.83	5.13				10.96	F
2	Alonso Correa [5]	Peru	2.67	1.37	3.77	0.67	0.63	5.67	3.93	1.60	9.60	3/4

==== Heat 2 ====
Rank	Surfer	Nation	Waves			Total score	Notes
Rank	Surfer	Nation	1	2	3	Total score	Notes
1	Jack Robinson [13]	Australia	0.50	4.50	7.83	12.33	F
2	Gabriel Medina [1]	Brazil	6.33			6.33	3/4

=== Bronze medal heat ===
Rank	Surfer	Nation	Waves								Total score	Notes
Rank	Surfer	Nation	1	2	3	4	5	6	7	8	Total score	Notes
1	Gabriel Medina [1]	Brazil	5.67	0.87	0.83	7.50	7.77	0.50	7.77	1.07	15.54	3rd place, bronze medalist(s)
2	Alonso Correa [5]	Peru	6.83	0.50	5.00	5.60	2.10				12.43	4th

=== Gold medal heat ===
The final match lasted for 35 minutes.

Rank	Surfer	Nation	Waves		Total score	Notes
Rank	Surfer	Nation	1	2	Total score	Notes
1	Kauli Vaast [3]	France	9.50	8.17	17.67	1st place, gold medalist(s)
2	Jack Robinson [13]	Australia	7.83		7.83	2nd place, silver medalist(s)
