= Surfing at the 2024 Summer Olympics – Women's shortboard =

Women's shortboard at the Games of the XXXIII Olympiad
- Olympic surfing
- Venue: Teahupo'o reef pass, Tahiti
- Dates: 27 July – 5 August 2024
- Competitors: 24 from 16 nations

Medalists
1st place, gold medalist(s)		Caroline Marks	United States
2nd place, silver medalist(s)		Tatiana Weston-Webb	Brazil
3rd place, bronze medalist(s)		Johanne Defay	France

The women's shortboard competition at the 2024 Summer Olympics in Paris was held from 25 July to 5 August at the Teahupo'o reef pass, Tahiti, a French overseas territory in the French Polynesia, located more than 9,320 miles (14,999 km) from Paris.

American surfer Caroline Marks won gold, Brazilian Tatiana Weston-Webb took silver, and Johanne Defay of France received bronze.

== Qualification ==
The 24 quota places per gender were distributed to the eligible surfers at the following events based on the hierarchical structure:

- Host country – As the host country, France reserves one quota place each for the men's and women's shortboard events. If one or more French surfers qualify regularly and directly, their slots will be reallocated to the next highest-ranked eligible surfers from the 2024 ISA World Surfing Games.
- 2022 ISA World Surfing Games – The winning teams by gender will secure one place for their respective NOC, regardless of the two-per-country quota limit.
- 2023 World Surf League Championship Tour – The top ten men and top eight women eligible for qualification will each be awarded a quota place.
- 2023 Pan American Games (continental qualification for America) – The gold medalist of each shortboard event will be entitled to a spot for the Olympics; otherwise, it will be reallocated to the next highest-ranked surfer in the same tournament.
- 2023 ISA World Surfing Games (continental qualification for Africa, Asia, Europe and Oceania) – The highest-ranked eligible male and female surfer from Africa, Asia, Europe and Oceania will be entitled to a spot for the Olympics; otherwise, it will be reallocated to the next highest-ranked surfer on the continent. The highest-ranked athlete (or next highest-ranked athlete if reallocation) must achieve a top-30 placings at this event; otherwise, it will be reallocated to the next highest-ranked eligible athlete, not yet qualified, regardless of continent.
- 2024 ISA World Surfing Games:
  - The winning teams by gender will secure one place for their respective NOC, regardless of the two-per-country quota limit.
  - The top five men and top seven women eligible for qualification will each be awarded a quota place.
- Universality place – For the first time, an additional place per gender will be entitled to eligible NOCs interested to have their surfers compete in Paris 2024. To be registered for a spot granted by the Universality principle, the athlete must finish among the top 50 in his or her respective shortboard event at the 2023 or 2024 ISA World Surfing Games.

== Competition format ==
The competition consists of six rounds:

- Round 1: 8 heats of 3 surfers each; the top in each heat (8 total) advance to round 3 while the other 2 from each heat (16 total) go to round 2 (essentially a repechage).

From round 2 onwards, all rounds are elimination rounds and the heats consists of two surfers, with the top surfer progressing to the next round and the second place being eliminated.

- Round 2: Head-to-head competition starts with this round, 8 heats of 2 surfers each; the top in each heat (8 total) advance to round 3 while the other in each heat (8 total) is eliminated.
- Round 3: 8 heats of 2 surfers each; winner advances, loser eliminated
- Quarterfinals: 4 heats of 2 surfers each; winner advances, loser eliminated
- Semifinals: 2 heats of 2 surfers each; winner advances to final, loser advances to third place heat
- Final and bronze medal match

The length of each heat (25 to 40 minutes) and the number of waves each surfer can ride (maximum 25) are determined by the technical director ahead of the day of competition. Scoring for each wave is from 0.1 to 10, with the best two waves for each surfer counting. Scores are based on the difficulty of manoeuvres performed, innovation and progression, variety, combination, speed, power, and flow of each manoeuvre.

=== Judges ===
The competition is judged by two head judges, two priority judges, and seven regular judges.

- Ian Buchanan, priority judge (NZL)
- Luiz Dantas (BRA)
- Tatsuya Fukagawa (JPN)
- Tory Gilkerson (USA)
- Daniel Kosoof (NZL)
- Benjamin Lowe (AUS)
- Marcel Miranda, priority judge (BRA)
- Luiz Pereira, head judge (BRA)
- Richard Pierce Jr., head judge (USA)
- Thierry Vidal (FRA)
- Mikel Zalacain (ESP)

After Australian surfing judge Benjamin Lowe posted a picture on social media of himself posing with Australian competitor Ethan Ewing and his coach Bede Durbidge, Lowe was removed from the judging panel by the International Surfing Association on August 1.

== Schedule ==
H	Heats	QF	Quarter-Finals	SF	Semi-Finals	F	Finals

Original schedule
Date	27 Jul	28 Jul	29 July	30 Jul		
Men's	R1	R2	R3	QF	SF	F
Women's	R1	R2	R3	QF	SF	F

Competition was originally set to take place over 4 days between 27 and 30 July, with a contingency period of 5 days between 31 July and 5 August, if necessary.

On 29 July, the weather turned dangerous towards the end of round 3 of the men's shortboard event, forcing the cancellation of the women's third round. The waves continued to be too rough for competition over the next two days, leaving the final women's round 3 and all finals re-scheduled for 1 and 3 August (a lack of contestable conditions was also expected for 2 August).

Competition was again called off on 3 and 4 August, with the semifinals and finals tentatively set for 5 August.

Round	Original dates	Revised dates	Original times	Revised times
Round 1	Saturday, 27 July 2024	—N/a	11:48	—N/a
Round 2	Sunday, 28 July 2024	—N/a	7:00	—N/a
Round 3 (round of 16)	Monday, 29 July 2024	Thursday, 1 August 2024	11:48	7:00
Quarter-finals	Tuesday, 30 July 2024	Thursday, 1 August 2024	9:24	14:12
Semi-finals; Bronze medal match Gold medal match	Tuesday, 30 July 2024	Monday, 5 August 2024	13:00; 14:53; 16:15	8:12; 10:36; 11:12

All times are local, PFT (UTC−10)

== Pre-competition seeding ==
Surfers were pre-seeded according to their final ranking in the 2024 ISA World Surfing Games.

1. Tatiana Weston-Webb (BRA) (silver medalist)
2. Johanne Defay (FRA) (bronze medalist)
3. Nadia Erostarbe (ESP) (QF)
4. Sol Aguirre (PER) (round 2)
5. Anat Lelior (ISR) (round 3)
6. Tainá Hinckel (BRA)(round 2)
7. Carissa Moore (USA) (QF)
8. Yolanda Hopkins (POR) (round 3)
9. Caroline Marks (USA) (gold medalist)
10. Teresa Bonvalot (POR) (round 2)
11. Camilla Kemp (GER) (round 2)
12. Sanoa Dempfle-Olin (CAN) (round 2)
13. Janire Gonzalez-Etxabarri (ESP) (round 2)
14. Yang Siqi (CHN) (round 3)
15. Brisa Hennessy (CRC) (fourth place)
16. Molly Picklum (AUS) (round 2)
17. Sarah Baum (RSA) (round 3)
18. Shino Matsuda (JPN) (round 3)
19. Luana Silva (BRA) (QF)
20. Tyler Wright (AUS) (QF)
21. Vahine Fierro (FRA) (round 3)
22. Saffi Vette (NZL) (round 2)
23. Candelaria Resano (NCA) (round 2)
24. Caitlin Simmers (USA) (round 3)

== Results ==
=== Round 1 ===
The first round is non-elimination. Surfers were seeded into eight heats of three surfers each, with the top surfer advancing straight to Round 3. The bottom two surfers were seeded into Round 2, the first elimination round.

==== Heat 1 ====
Rank	Surfer	Nation	Waves					Total score	Notes
Rank	Surfer	Nation	1	2	3	4	5	Total score	Notes
1	Caroline Marks [9]	United States	2.00	8.50	1.50	2.37	9.43	17.93	R3
2	Sarah Baum [17]	South Africa	1.00	5.67	2.80	2.73	0.27	8.47	R2
3	Yolanda Hopkins [8]	Portugal	2.50	4.50	0.60	0.60	0.20	7.00	R2

==== Heat 2 ====
Rank	Surfer	Nation	Waves								Total score	Notes
Rank	Surfer	Nation	1	2	3	4	5	6	7	8	Total score	Notes
1	Vahiné Fierro [21]	France	1.33	6.17	2.43	5.00					11.17	R3
2	Sol Aguirre [4]	Peru	0.43	0.20	1.10	0.70	1.90	0.63	2.40	1.10	4.30	R2
3	Janire Gonzalez-Etxabarri [13]	Spain	0.70	0.97	1.30	1.13					2.43	R2

==== Heat 3 ====
Rank	Surfer	Nation	Waves							Total score	Notes
Rank	Surfer	Nation	1	2	3	4	5	6	7	Total score	Notes
1	Tyler Wright [20]	Australia	1.17	4.17	3.50	2.33	1.27	3.20	2.07	7.67	R3
2	Anat Lelior [5]	Israel	0.50	0.43	3.23	2.20				5.43	R2
3	Sanoa Dempfle-Olin [12]	Canada	2.83	2.00	1.67	0.50				4.83	R2

==== Heat 4 ====
Rank	Surfer	Nation	Waves						Total score	Notes
Rank	Surfer	Nation	1	2	3	4	5	6	Total score	Notes
1	Caitlin Simmers [24]	United States	1.83	6.50	0.50	6.43	1.40	3.83	12.93	R3
2	Tatiana Weston-Webb [1]	Brazil	5.83	1.93	0.23	4.50			10.33	R2
3	Molly Picklum [16]	Australia	1.57	0.93	2.67	5.77			8.44	R2

==== Heat 5 ====
Rank	Surfer	Nation	Waves					Total score	Notes
Rank	Surfer	Nation	1	2	3	4	5	Total score	Notes
1	Brisa Hennessy [15]	Costa Rica	8.33	3.33	6.50	7.23		15.56	R3
2	Johanne Defay [2]	France	0.33	2.33	2.33	5.00	4.50	9.50	R2
3	Candelaria Resano [23]	Nicaragua	0.83	1.33	3.43	6.00	0.50	9.43	R2

==== Heat 6 ====
Rank	Surfer	Nation	Waves					Total score	Notes
Rank	Surfer	Nation	1	2	3	4	5	Total score	Notes
1	Luana Silva [19]	Brazil	1.00	2.77	4.50			7.27	R3
2	Tainá Hinckel [6]	Brazil	0.57	2.50	1.70	2.83	2.90	5.73	R2
3	Camilla Kemp [11]	Germany	2.00	0.53	0.80	0.20		2.80	R2

==== Heat 7 ====
Rank	Surfer	Nation	Waves					Total score	Notes
Rank	Surfer	Nation	1	2	3	4	5	Total score	Notes
1	Nadia Erostarbe [3]	Spain	8.33	3.83	3.57	5.50	1.63	13.83	R3
2	Saffi Vette [22]	New Zealand	2.33	4.73	2.77			7.50	R2
3	Yang Siqi [14]	China	2.50	1.00	0.80	2.90	0.33	5.40	R2

==== Heat 8 ====
Rank	Surfer	Nation	Waves						Total score	Notes
Rank	Surfer	Nation	1	2	3	4	5	6	Total score	Notes
1	Carissa Moore [7]	United States	3.83	6.17	9.00	7.50			16.50	R3
2	Shino Matsuda [18]	Japan	0.63	8.33	2.33	1.07	2.83		11.16	R2
3	Teresa Bonvalot [10]	Portugal	5.17	0.27	5.17	0.87	3.60	1.47	10.34	R2

=== Round 2 ===
In the second round surfers were seeded into eight heats of two surfers each, with the top surfer advancing to Round 3 (round of 16) and the second place being eliminated.

The pairs in each heat were formed based on surfers' results in the round 1 and according to their pre-competition (PC) seeding, with the second places facing the third places:

- Heat 1: 2nd in Round 1, 3rd best PC seeding v 3rd in Round 1, 6th best PC seeding
- Heat 2: 2nd in Round 1, 6th best PC seeding v 3rd in Round 1, 3rd best PC seeding
- Heat 3: 2nd in Round 1, 7th best PC seeding v 3rd in Round 1, 2nd best PC seeding
- Heat 4: 2nd in Round 1, 2nd best PC seeding v 3rd in Round 1, 7th best PC seeding
- Heat 5: 2nd in Round 1, Best PC seeding v 3rd in Round 1, 8th best PC seeding
- Heat 6: 2nd in Round 1, 8th best PC seeding v 3rd in Round 1, Best PC seeding
- Heat 7: 2nd in Round 1, 5th best PC seeding v 3rd in Round 1, 4th best PC seeding
- Heat 8: 2nd in Round 1, 4th best PC seeding v 3rd in Round 1, 5th best PC seeding

==== Heat 1 ====
Rank	Surfer	Nation	Waves					Total score	Notes
Rank	Surfer	Nation	1	2	3	4	5	Total score	Notes
1	Yang Siqi [14]	China	3.00	4.50	0.70	2.90	4.17	8.67	R3
2	Sol Aguirre [4]	Peru	2.00	2.50	0.73	1.33		4.50	E

==== Heat 2 ====
Rank	Surfer	Nation	Waves									Total score	Notes
Rank	Surfer	Nation	1	2	3	4	5	6	7	8	9	Total score	Notes
1	Sarah Baum [17]	South Africa	0.53	1.00	0.23	2.47	4.83	5.67	0.77	0.13	1.73	10.50	R3
2	Camilla Kemp [11]	Germany	0.37	2.17	0.70	1.60	2.77	0.30				4.94	E

==== Heat 3 ====
Rank	Surfer	Nation	Waves					Total score	Notes
Rank	Surfer	Nation	1	2	3	4	5	Total score	Notes
1	Shino Matsuda [18]	Japan	1.60	2.10	0.57	7.67		9.77	R3
2	Teresa Bonvalot [10]	Portugal	1.50	3.67	0.63	3.17	1.20	6.84	E

==== Heat 4 ====
Rank	Surfer	Nation	Waves						Total score	Notes
Rank	Surfer	Nation	1	2	3	4	5	6	Total score	Notes
1	Johanne Defay [2]	France	2.83	4.00	7.83	1.00	3.93	1.00	11.83	R3
2	Molly Picklum [16]	Australia	1.00	5.83	0.67	1.60			7.43	E

==== Heat 5 ====
Rank	Surfer	Nation	Waves				Total score	Notes
Rank	Surfer	Nation	1	2	3	4	Total score	Notes
1	Tatiana Weston-Webb [1]	Brazil	5.50	2.83	4.00	1.33	9.50	R3
2	Candelaria Resano [23]	Nicaragua	0.87	1.43	1.87	0.93	3.30	E

==== Heat 6 ====
Rank	Surfer	Nation	Waves					Total score	Notes
Rank	Surfer	Nation	1	2	3	4	5	Total score	Notes
1	Yolanda Hopkins [8]	Portugal	0.17	0.77	3.67	1.00	0.33	4.67	R3
2	Saffi Vette [22]	New Zealand	0.27	0.43	0.60	0.67		1.27	E

==== Heat 7 ====
Rank	Surfer	Nation	Waves					Total score	Notes
Rank	Surfer	Nation	1	2	3	4	5	Total score	Notes
1	Tainá Hinckel [6]	Brazil	3.23	3.30	3.80			7.10	R3
2	Sanoa Dempfle-Olin [12]	Canada	3.50	2.50	2.10	2.80	0.43	6.30	E

==== Heat 8 ====
Rank	Surfer	Nation	Waves					Total score	Notes
Rank	Surfer	Nation	1	2	3	4	5	Total score	Notes
1	Anat Lelior [5]	Israel	6.50	0.93	3.17	3.33	4.50	11.00	R3
2	Janire Gonzalez-Etxabarri [13]	Spain	0.20	2.50	0.30			2.80	E

=== Bracket ===
The bracket was determined based on the seeding made for round 3 (round of 16). The winner from each head-to-head heat qualifies to the next round.

3rd round
9	Caroline Marks (USA)	6.93
14	Yang Siqi (CHN)	1.63
20	Tyler Wright (AUS)	11.10
5	Anat Lelior (ISR)	7.74
21	Vahine Fierro (FRA)	7.54
2	Johanne Defay (FRA)	9.00
7	Carissa Moore (USA)	8.16
17	Sarah Baum (RSA)	3.87
3	Nadia Erostarbe (ESP)	8.34
18	Shino Matsuda (JPN)	5.84
24	Caitlin Simmers (USA)	1.93
1	Tatiana Weston-Webb (BRA)	12.34
19	Luana Silva (BRA)	6.77
6	Tainá Hinckel (BRA)	5.93
15	Brisa Hennessy (CRC)	12.34
8	Yolanda Hopkins (POR)	9.90

Quarter-finals
9	Caroline Marks (USA)	7.77
20	Tyler Wright (AUS)	5.37
2	Johanne Defay (FRA)	10.34
7	Carissa Moore (USA)	6.50
3	Nadia Erostarbe (ESP)	6.34
1	Tatiana Weston-Webb (BRA)	8.10
19	Luana Silva (BRA)	5.47
15	Brisa Hennessy (CRC)	6.37

Semi-finals
9	Caroline Marks (USA)	12.17
2	Johanne Defay (FRA)	12.17
1	Tatiana Weston-Webb (BRA)	13.66
15	Brisa Hennessy (CRC)	6.17

Gold medal match
9	(gold) Caroline Marks (USA)	10.50
1	(silver) Tatiana Weston-Webb (BRA)	10.33
Bronze medal match
2	(bronze) Johanne Defay (FRA)	12.66
15	Brisa Hennessy (CRC)	4.93

=== Round 3 ===
In the third round (round of 16) surfers were also seeded into eight heats of two surfers each, with the top surfer advancing to the quarter-finals and the second place being eliminated.

Round three was initially scheduled for the 30th July, after the men's round 3, but was called off and rescheduled to August 1st.

The pairs in each heat were formed based on surfers' results in the round 1 and according to their pre-competition (PC) seeding, with the second places facing the third places:

- Heat 1: 1st in Round 1, 3rd best PC seeding v Round 2 winner, 6th best PC seeding
- Heat 2: 1st in Round 1, 6th best PC seeding v Round 2 winner, 3rd best PC seeding
- Heat 3: 1st in Round 1, 7th best PC seeding v Round 2 winner, 2nd best PC seeding
- Heat 4: 1st in Round 1, 2nd best PC seeding v Round 2 winner, 7th best PC seeding
- Heat 5: 1st in Round 1, Best PC seeding v Round 2 winner, 8th best PC seeding
- Heat 6: 1st in Round 1, 8th best PC seeding v Round 2 winner, Best PC seeding
- Heat 7: 1st in Round 1, 5th best PC seeding v Round 2 winner, 4th best PC seeding
- Heat 8: 1st in Round 1, 4th best PC seeding v Round 2 winner, 5th best PC seeding

==== Heat 1 ====
Rank	Surfer	Nation	Waves				Total score	Notes
Rank	Surfer	Nation	1	2	3	4	Total score	Notes
1	Caroline Marks [9]	United States	2.00	2.60	4.33	0.37	6.93	QF
2	Yang Siqi [14]	China	0.50	1.00	0.20	0.63	1.63	E

==== Heat 2 ====
Rank	Surfer	Nation	Waves									Total score	Notes
Rank	Surfer	Nation	1	2	3	4	5	6	7	8	9	Total score	Notes
1	Tyler Wright [20]	Australia	5.83	2.67	0.70	2.60	2.43	2.50	0.33	1.23	5.27	11.10	QF
2	Anat Lelior [5]	Israel	0.50	4.67	1.07	3.07	0.80	0.97	1.93	0.43		7.74	E

==== Heat 3 ====
Rank	Surfer	Nation	Waves							Total score	Notes
Rank	Surfer	Nation	1	2	3	4	5	6	7	Total score	Notes
1	Johanne Defay [2]	France	3.00	0.57	3.33	2.20	5.00	4.00	3.07	9.00	QF
2	Vahine Fierro [21]	France	3.77	1.77	3.77	2.23	1.93	1.43		7.54	E

==== Heat 4 ====
Rank	Surfer	Nation	Waves						Total score	Notes
Rank	Surfer	Nation	1	2	3	4	5	6	Total score	Notes
1	Carissa Moore [7]	United States	2.50	3.83	0.50	0.77	2.30	4.33	8.16	QF
2	Sarah Baum [17]	South Africa	1.87	0.50	2.00	0.77			3.87	E

==== Heat 5 ====
Rank	Surfer	Nation	Waves					Total score	Notes
Rank	Surfer	Nation	1	2	3	4	5	Total score	Notes
1	Nadia Erostarbe [3]	Spain	3.50	0.50	4.77	0.77	3.57	8.34	QF
2	Shino Matsuda [18]	Japan	2.67	3.17				5.84	E

==== Heat 6 ====
Rank	Surfer	Nation	Waves					Total score	Notes
Rank	Surfer	Nation	1	2	3	4	5	Total score	Notes
1	Tatiana Weston-Webb [1]	Brazil	0.30	6.17	6.17	3.33	0.20	12.34	QF
2	Caitlin Simmers [24]	United States	0.27	1.50	0.43			1.93	E

==== Heat 7 ====
Rank	Surfer	Nation	Waves					Total score	Notes
Rank	Surfer	Nation	1	2	3	4	5	Total score	Notes
1	Luana Silva [19]	Brazil	2.50	2.17	3.50	3.27		6.77	QF
2	Tainá Hinckel [6]	Brazil	0.80	1.77	2.93	3.00	0.17	5.93	E

==== Heat 8 ====
Rank	Surfer	Nation	Waves								Total score	Notes
Rank	Surfer	Nation	1	2	3	4	5	6	7	8	Total score	Notes
1	Brisa Hennessy [15]	Costa Rica	0.83	4.17	7.67	0.50	2.17	0.50	2.57	4.67	12.34	QF
2	Yolanda Hopkins [8]	Portugal	6.33	3.57	1.33	1.83	1.60				9.90	E

=== Quarter-finals ===
Heat 1

Rank	Surfer	Nation	Waves						Total score	Notes
Rank	Surfer	Nation	1	2	3	4	5	6	Total score	Notes
1	Caroline Marks [9]	United States	4.00	2.33	2.17	0.20	3.77	0.50	7.77	SF
2	Tyler Wright [20]	Australia	1.00	3.50	1.87	0.87			5.37	E

Heat 2

Rank	Surfer	Nation	Waves						Total score	Notes
Rank	Surfer	Nation	1	2	3	4	5	6	Total score	Notes
1	Johanne Defay [2]	France	5.67	1.90	4.67	0.60	2.17	4.50	10.34	SF
2	Carissa Moore [7]	United States	0.50	3.00	3.50	1.00	1.97		6.50	E

Heat 3

Rank	Surfer	Nation	Waves							Total score	Notes
Rank	Surfer	Nation	1	2	3	4	5	6	7	Total score	Notes
1	Tatiana Weston-Webb [1]	Brazil	3.33	2.67	0.50	3.03	1.23	3.60	4.50	8.10	SF
2	Nadia Erostarbe [3]	Spain	0.20	0.37	0.50	2.77	3.57	0.83		6.34	E

Heat 4

Rank	Surfer	Nation	Waves						Total score	Notes
Rank	Surfer	Nation	1	2	3	4	5	6	Total score	Notes
1	Brisa Hennessy [15]	Costa Rica	2.33	0.47	3.17	3.20	0.37		6.37	SF
2	Luana Silva [19]	Brazil	0.30	0.27	0.57	2.23	2.57	2.90	5.47	E

=== Semi-finals ===
Heat 1

Because the final scores were tied, Caroline Marks won the heat as she had the highest-scoring single wave (7.00).

Rank	Surfer	Nation	Waves						Total score	Notes
Rank	Surfer	Nation	1	2	3	4	5	6	Total score	Notes
1	Caroline Marks [9]	United States	5.17	5.00	7.00	0.47			12.17	F
2	Johanne Defay [2]	France	5.67	4.00	3.00	0.47	6.50	3.30	12.17	3/4

Heat 2

Around the 20:00 mark, Hennessy was penalised for priority interference, resulting in only her single highest-scoring wave being counted.

Rank	Surfer	Nation	Waves						Total score	Notes
Rank	Surfer	Nation	1	2	3	4	5	6	Total score	Notes
1	Tatiana Weston-Webb [1]	Brazil	2.67	0.57	5.33	4.00	5.30	8.33	13.66	F
2	Brisa Hennessy [15]	Costa Rica	1.93	0.00*	4.83 PEN	6.17	0.33		6.17	3/4

=== Bronze medal heat ===
The bronze medal match lasted for 35 minutes. The waves had a height of 1.8 metres (5.9 ft) from the SSW at an interval of 14 seconds.

Rank	Surfer	Nation	Waves									Total score	Notes
Rank	Surfer	Nation	1	2	3	4	5	6	7	8	9	Total score	Notes
1	Johanne Defay [2]	France	0.20	5.83	5.27	5.57	0.53	6.83	0.50	0.70	4.17	12.66	3rd place, bronze medalist(s)
2	Brisa Hennessy [15]	Costa Rica	3.00	1.50	1.93							4.93	4th

=== Gold medal heat ===
The gold medal match was 35 minutes long. The waves were 2.4 metres (7.9 ft) high from the SSW with an interval of 14 seconds.

Rank	Surfer	Nation	Waves					Total score	Notes
Rank	Surfer	Nation	1	2	3	4	5	Total score	Notes
1	Caroline Marks [9]	United States	0.50	7.50	1.43	3.00	2.00	10.50	1st place, gold medalist(s)
2	Tatiana Weston-Webb [1]	Brazil	0.33	0.43	5.83	1.80	4.50	10.33	2nd place, silver medalist(s)
