= Surfing at the Summer Olympics =

- IOC Code: SRF
- Governing body: ISA
- Events: 2 (men: 1; women: 1)

Summer Olympics
- 1896; 1900; 1904; 1908; 1912; 1920; 1924; 1928; 1932; 1936; 1948; 1952; 1956; 1960; 1964; 1968; 1972; 1976; 1980; 1984; 1988; 1992; 1996; 2000; 2004; 2008; 2012; 2016; 2020; 2024; 2028; 2032
- Medalists

Competitions in the sport of surfing, governed by the International Surfing Association (ISA), have been held at two editions of the Summer Olympic Games. First selected as one of the discretionary sports at the 2020 and 2024 games, surfing will be inducted as one of the mandatory sports at the 2028 games. Athletes compete in the discipline of shortboard surfing, which is the sole event in the sport at the Olympics. The United States have won the most gold medals (2), while Brazil have won the most medals overall (3).

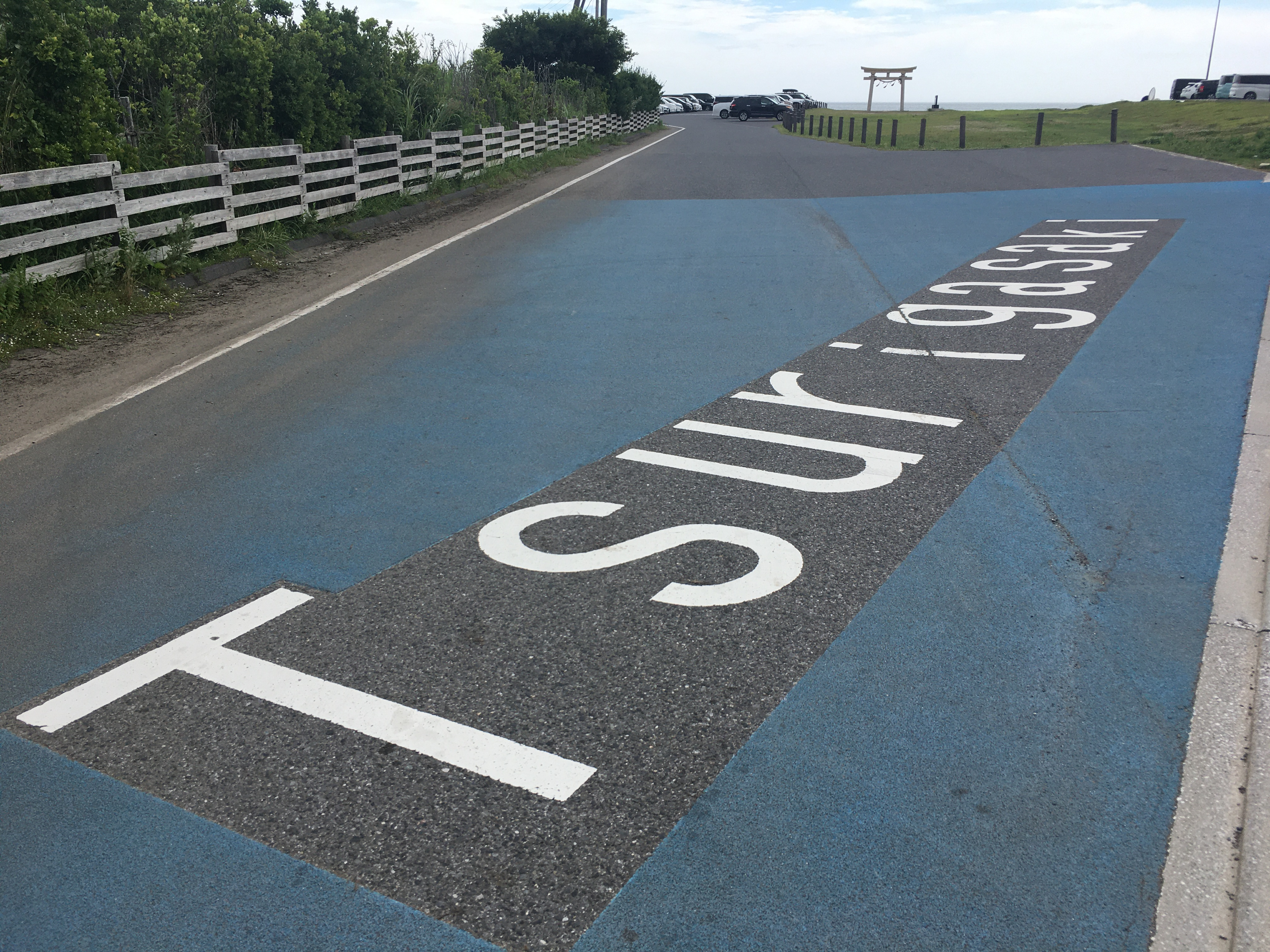
Tsurigasaki, worlds first Olympic surf beach in Japan

== Bid for inclusion ==
In September 2015, surfing was included in a shortlist along with baseball, softball, karate, skateboarding, and sport climbing to be considered for inclusion in the 2020 Summer Olympics. In June 2016, the executive board of the International Olympic Committee (IOC) announced that they would support the proposal to include all of the shortlisted sports in the 2020 Games. Finally, on August 3, 2016, all five sports (counting baseball and softball together as one sport) were approved for inclusion in the 2020 Olympic program.

One of the biggest obstacles to surfing being included in the Olympics for many years was a landlocked country hosting the games which would make surfing events difficult to stage, and another one was that drowning is one of the big risks in surfing, and the IOC was less likely to take high liabilities in the event of a death.

== Events ==
Event	20	24	28	Years
Men's shortboard	X	X	X	3
Women's shortboard	X	X	X	3
Total	2	2	2	

== Venues ==
The surfing competitions took place in the following locations:

Edition	Place
2020	Tsurigasaki beach, Chiba
2024	Teahupo'o reef pass, Tahiti
2028	Trestles

== Participating nations ==
The following nations have taken part in the Olympic surfing competition. The numbers in the table indicate the number of competitors sent to that year's Olympics.

Nation	2020	2024	2028	Years
Australia	4	4		2
Argentina	1	2		2
Austria	1	2		2
Brazil	4	6		1
Canada	4	1		1
China	2	1		2
Colombia	1	1		2
Chile	1	7		2
Costa Rica	2	1		2
Czech Republic	1	1		2
Denmark	1	1		2
Ecuador	1	7		2
El Salvador	1	1		2
France	4	4		2
Finland	1	1		2
Germany	1	2		2
Great Britain	2	3		2
Indonesia	1	1		1
Iran	–	1		1
Italy	1	1		2
Israel	1	1		2
Japan	4	4		2
Kazakhstan	1	1		2
Morocco	1	1		2
Mexico	1	1		2
New Zealand	2	2		1
Netherlands	2	2		2
Nicaragua	1	1		2
Poland	1	2		2
Portugal	3	2		2
Peru	4	3		2
Philippines	1	7		2
Puerto Rico	2	1		2
ROC	3	–	–	1
Slovenia	2	1		2
South Africa	1	3		2
South Korea	2	3		2
Spain	4	3		2
Sweden	1	1		2
Switzerland	1	1		2
Thailand	5	1		2
Ukraine	–	2		1
United States	4	5		2
Nations	19	22		24
Surfers	40	68		
Year	2020	2024	2028	3

== Medalists ==
=== Men's shortboard ===
Games	Gold	Silver	Bronze
2020 Tokyo	Ítalo Ferreira; Brazil	Kanoa Igarashi; Japan	Owen Wright; Australia
2024 Paris	Kauli Vaast; France	Jack Robinson; Australia	Gabriel Medina; Brazil
2028 Los Angeles			

Medals
Rank	Nation	Gold	Silver	Bronze	Total
1	Brazil	1	0	1	2
2	France	1	0	0	1
3	Australia	0	1	1	2
4	Japan	0	1	0	1
Total	4 nations	2	2	2	6

=== Women's shortboard ===
Games	Gold	Silver	Bronze
2020 Tokyo	Carissa Moore; United States	Bianca Buitendag; South Africa	Amuro Tsuzuki; Japan
2024 Paris	Caroline Marks; United States	Tatiana Weston-Webb; Brazil	Johanne Defay; France
2028 Los Angeles			

Medals
Rank	Nation	Gold	Silver	Bronze	Total
1	United States	2	0	0	2
2	Brazil	0	1	0	1
2	South Africa	0	1	0	1
4	France	0	0	1	1
4	Japan	0	0	1	1
Total	5 nations	2	2	2	6

== Medal table ==
Rank	Nation	Gold	Silver	Bronze	Total
1	United States	2	0	0	2
2	Brazil	1	1	1	3
3	France	1	0	1	2
4	Australia	0	1	1	2
4	Japan	0	1	1	2
6	South Africa	0	1	0	1
Totals (6 entries)		4	4	4	12
