= 2023 ISA World Surfing Games =

Surfing event in El Salvador

- Venue: La Bocana and El Sunzal
- Location: Surf City, El Salvador
- Date: 30 May – 7 June 2023
- Competitors: 294 from 63 nations

The 2023 ISA World Surfing Games took place across the La Bocana and El Sunzal waves at Surf City, El Salvador, from 30 May to 7 June 2023. The event was organised by the International Surfing Association (ISA).

== Medal summary ==
=== Medallists ===
Event	Gold	Silver	Bronze
Men	Alan Cleland; Mexico	Lucca Mesinas; Peru	Miguel Tudela; Peru
Women	Tatiana Weston-Webb; Brazil	Erin Brooks; Canada	Johanne Defay; France
Team Points	Peru; Alonso Correa; Lucca Mesinas; Miguel Tudela; Sol Aguirre; Daniella Rosas; Arena Rodríguez	France; Maxime Huscenot; Kauli Vaast; Joan Duru; Pauline Ado; Johanne Defay; Vahiné Fierro	Brazil; Gabriel Medina; Filipe Toledo; João Chianca; Luana Silva; Silvana Lima; Tatiana Weston-Webb

- Standings after the event

=== Medal table ===
* Host nation (El Salvador)

Rank	Nation	Gold	Silver	Bronze	Total
1	Peru (PER)	1	1	1	3
2	Brazil (BRA)	1	0	1	2
3	Mexico (MEX)	1	0	0	1
4	France (FRA)	0	1	1	2
5	Canada (CAN)	0	1	0	1
Totals (5 entries)		3	3	3	9

== Olympic qualification ==
The event contributed towards qualification for the 2024 Olympics surfing competition in Teahupo'o, where surfing will make its second appearance as an Olympic sport. The highest-ranked eligible man and woman from each of Africa, Asia, Europe and Oceania qualified for the Olympics.

Qualified athletes

Men

- Jordy Smith (RSA) (Note: If Jordy Smith qualifies via 2023 World Surf League placings and since Teva Bouchgua of Morocco (the second-highest finisher from Africa) failed to achieve a top 30 placings for this event, this qualification place will be reallocated to the next highest-ranked eligible athlete, not yet qualified, regardless of continent, in this case it would be Alan Cleland of Mexico, as the champion of the men's event.)
- Kanoa Igarashi (JPN) (Note: If Kanoa Igarashi qualifies via 2023 World Surf League placings, this qualification place will be taken by Reo Inaba of Japan, as the second-highest finisher from Asia.)
- Kauli Vaast (FRA)
- Billy Stairmand (NZL)

Women

- Sarah Baum (RSA)
- Shino Matsuda (JPN)
- Vahiné Fierro (FRA)
- Saffi Vette (NZL)

== Participating nations ==
The following countries sent delegations to the 2023 ISA World Surfing Games:

- Afghanistan
- Algeria
- American Samoa
- Argentina
- Australia
- Austria
- Barbados
- Belgium
- Brazil
- Canada
- Chile
- China
- Chinese Taipei
- Colombia
- Costa Rica
- Czech Republic
- Dominican Republic
- Ecuador
- El Salvador
- Finland
- France
- Germany
- Great Britain
- Greece
- Guam
- Guatemala
- India
- Indonesia
- Iran
- Ireland
- Israel
- Italy
- Jamaica
- Japan
- Latvia
- Lithuania
- Mauritius
- Mexico
- Moldova
- Morocco
- Netherlands
- New Zealand
- Nicaragua
- Norway
- Panama
- Peru
- Philippines
- Poland
- Portugal
- Puerto Rico
- Saudi Arabia
- Senegal
- South Africa
- South Korea
- Spain
- Switzerland
- Thailand
- Trinidad and Tobago
- Turkey
- Ukraine
- Uruguay
- United States
- United States Virgin Islands
- Venezuela
