= Anat Lelior =

Israeli surfer (born 2000)

Anat Lelior ענת ליליאור
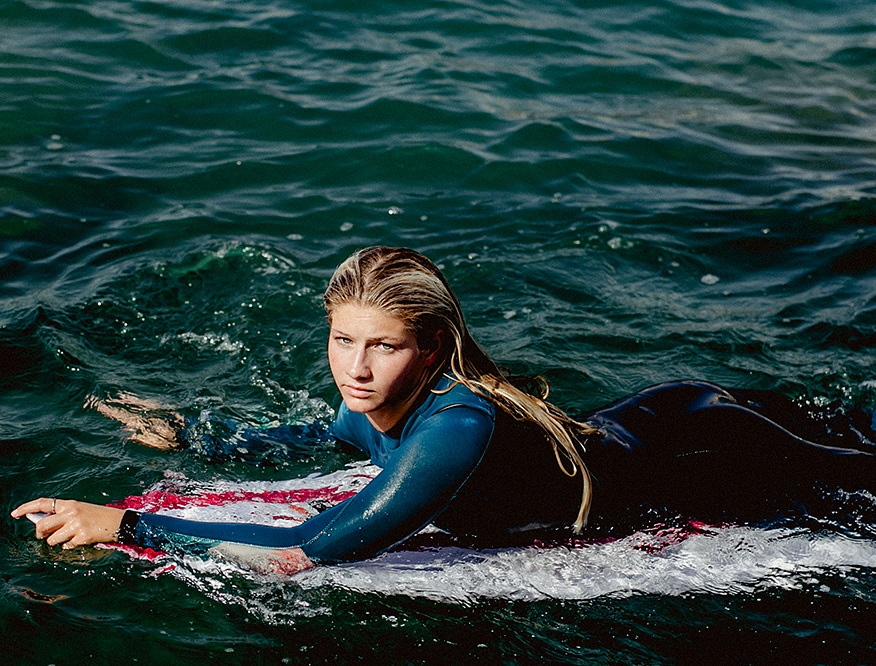
- Lelior in 2017

Personal information
- Born: April 29, 2000 (age 26) Tel Aviv, Israel
- Height: 5 ft 4 in (163 cm)
- Weight: 114 lb (52 kg)

Surfing career
- Sport: Surfing

Surfing specifications
- Stance: Goofy
Medal record
Surfing
Representing Israel
Maccabiah Games
Gold medal – first place	2022 Netanya	Women
Deeply Pro
Gold medal – first place	2019 Anglet	Women
World Surf League Europe Pro
Silver medal – second place	2018	Junior Women

Anat Lelior (Hebrew: ענת ליליאור; born April 29, 2000) is an Israeli Olympic surfer. She represented Israel at the 2020 Summer Olympics, and finished 17th in the shortboard. Lelior represented Israel at the 2024 Paris Olympics in surfing in Women's shortboard, in Teahupo'o reef pass, Tahiti, French Polynesia, and came in ninth.

== Early life ==
Lelior was born and raised in Tel Aviv, Israel, and is Jewish. Her mother is painter and art teacher Eti Jacobi, and her father is Yochai Lelior, who owns a company that provides guidance and rescue services for travelers, such as those who become stuck climbing on a mountain. She has a brother Ido, who is a medic in the Israeli Defense Forces, and a sister.

Her sister Noa Lelior, two years younger than she is, is a professional surfer as well, who in 2015 decided to take the family to a surfing competition in France instead of having her bat mitzvah party - this in turn led her older sister Anat to see a bigger stage in surfing. The sisters both attended Herzliya Hebrew Gymnasium in Tel Aviv. Referring to surfing, Anat said: "Some people don't know what their purpose in life is, Noa and I know." Anat served as a soldier in the Israel Defense Forces for two years; in Israel, military service is mandatory at 18 years of age. She and her family all live in the same apartment in Tel Aviv, between the Carmel Market and the beach.

== Surfing career ==
=== Early years; Israeli championships ===
Lelior began surfing at the age of 5, when her father would take her out to the Mediterranean Sea at the coast of her hometown Tel Aviv. She won her first Israeli women's title when she was 12 years old, and said: "I fell in love with winning." She won the title every subsequent year until she turned 19 years of age. Lelior's surfing club Galim is owned by Shlomi Eyni and Inbar.

=== 2018–21; World Surf League Europe Pro Junior runner-up ===
Lelior was the 2018 World Surf League (WSL) Europe Pro Junior runner-up. She won the gold medal in the 2018 Caparica Junior Pro in Portugal, the silver medal in the Caparica Pro, and bronze medals in the Junior Pro Espinho in Portugal, Junior Pro Biscarrosse in France, and Junior Pro Sopela in Spain.

In 2019, she won the Burton Automotive Pro International Trials in Newcastle, New South Wales, Australia at Surfest. Lelior also won the 2019 Deeply Pro Anglet, a WSL Qualifying Series (QS) 1,500 event at Chambre d’Amour in the Pyrénées-Atlantiques department in the Nouvelle-Aquitaine region of southwestern France, defeating Australian Isabella Nichols in the final, and moving Lelior to third in the European rankings. She won bronze medals in the Cabreiroá Las Americas Pro Tenerife in the Canary Islands, and the Cabreiroá Pro Zarautz Basque Country in Spain.

In 2020 Lelior was honored as a "Global Barbie Role Model," with a Barbie doll created in her image.

In 2021 she won a bronze medal in the Estrella Galicia Caparica Surf Fest in Spain. She said: "I’m meeting people like Owen Wright... I’m so stoked seeing these people. I’m just a kid, you know?... And now, here I am. I’m so hyped and honored to be surfing with some of the world’s best. I’ll be competing against my idols."

=== 2020 Olympic Games ===
Lelior qualified for the Surfing at the 2020 Summer Olympics. She did so by finishing at 19 years of age as the highest-ranked female surfer from Europe (Israel is considered part of Europe, according to International Olympic Committee protocol), and one of the top 30 surfers in the open division at the 2019 ISA World Surfing Games in Miyazaki, Japan.

She represented Israel at the 2020 Summer Olympics and competed in the Women's shortboard in July 2021, at the Shidashita Beach, located about 40 miles (64 km) outside of Tokyo in Chiba, as she was released from her Israel Defense Forces service to compete in the Games. Surfing with a bad hip injury, which later required surgery, she came in 17th.

She said: "It’s an amazing event.... It’s so nice seeing how surfing connects everybody ... on one love that is surfing... Everybody is a person, it doesn’t matter if he has the flag of Iran behind his back... or the Israeli flag. It doesn’t matter because we are all surfers and it breaks all boundaries... I have friends from Fiji, Costa Rica, and Iran."

=== 2021–24 ===
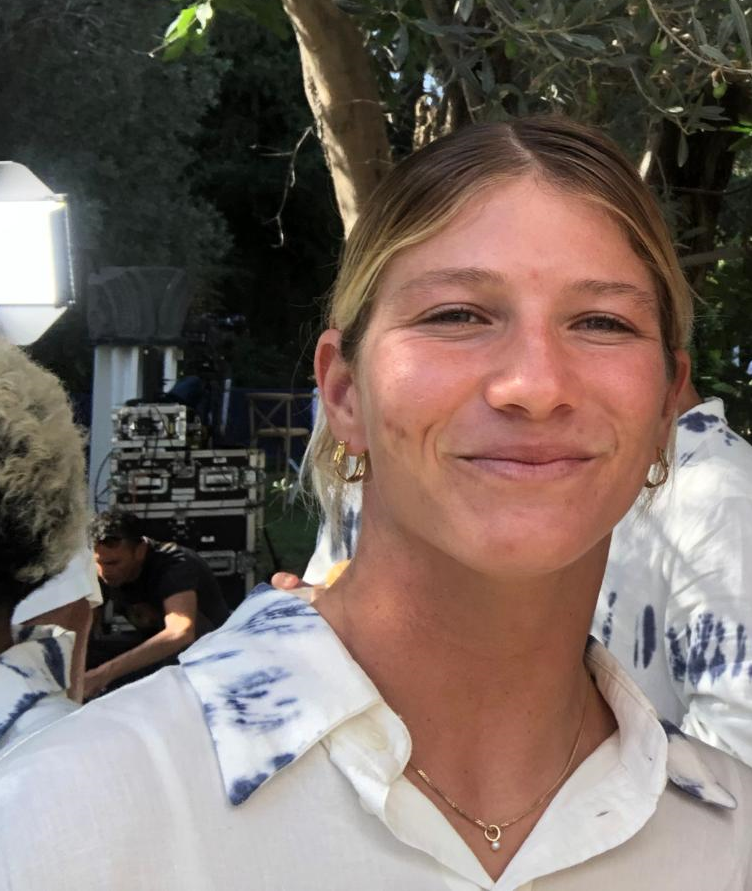
Israeli surfer Anat Lelior

Her hip injury ultimately necessitated hip surgery after the Tokyo Olympics, and Lelior then suffered an ankle injury that disabled her for six months. Altogether, her two injuries kept her largely out of competitions for the two years.

In August 2021 and 2022 Lelior won bronze medals in the Rip Curl Pro Anglet.

In November 2022, Lelior won the silver medal in the Alaïa Open Winter Cup in Switzerland. She also won the gold medal in women's surfing at the 2022 Maccabiah Games in Israel.

In March 2024 Lelior came in 6th in the 2024 World Championships in Arecibo, Puerto Rico. It was the best ranking ever by an Israeli surfer in the World Championships. Lelior qualified for her second Olympic Games after her performance at the 2024 World Surfing Games.

=== 2024 Paris Olympics ===
Lelior represented Israel at the 2024 Paris Olympics in surfing in Women's shortboard, in Teahupo'o reef pass, Tahiti, French Polynesia. In the first round (which was non-elimination), she came in second of three surfers in her heat. In Round 2, which was direct elimination, she defeated Spain's Janire Gonzalez-Etxabarri by a total heat score of 11.00 to 2.80. In Round 3 she was defeated by Australia's Tyler Wright, and came in ninth.

== See also ==
- List of Jewish surfers
