= The Golden Moment =

2024 photograph of Gabriel Medina

The Golden Moment

The Golden Moment is a 2024 photograph of Brazilian surfer Gabriel Medina taken by French sports photographer Jerome Brouillet in Teahupoʻo for AFP during the 2024 Summer Olympics.

The picture depicts Medina emerging from a wave in a unique pose after successfully completing a move that would eventually earn him a record single-wave Olympic score of 9.90. It quickly went viral, was recognized as a symbol of the 2024 games, was considered by some as one of the greatest Olympic, surfing and/or sports pictures of all time and earned a number of accolades, besides generating memes in Brazil.

== Background ==
=== Gabriel Medina (subject) ===
Gabriel Medina represented Brazil at the men's shortboard competition of the 2024 Summer Olympics hosted in Paris, with the surfing events being held in Tahiti. During the fifth heat of the third day of the competition (29 July), facing off against Kanoa Igarashi from Japan, Medina surfed a big wave and received a record score of 9.90. After going on a successful tube, Medina emerged on the other side with all fingers raised to signal the judges to award him with a score of 10. He then rode the wave to its back, from which he kicked out.

=== Jerome Brouillet (photographer) ===
Jerome Brouillet was taking pictures of the Olympic surfing competitions for AFP. A surfer himself, Brouillet moved from Marseille to Tahiti about 10 years before the games and has taken other photos of Medina in previous Billabong Pro Teahupoo events as part of the World Surf League.

He was on one of the two media boats alongside six fellow photographers and was taking pictures in bursts, as usual in sports photography. He took between 4-6 pictures of Medina in the air and immediately saw the potential of the particular shot which went viral; he credits his AFP editor, who was getting the images as they were taken, with endorsing its potential and posting it right away for the world to see. He claims it was the first time that such quick-sharing technology was used in Tahiti.

Brouillet said taking the picture was easy; anticipating Medina's move is what mattered the most to accomplish the shot. He said he knew Medina would often make similar gestures after a successful ride.

== Description ==
The picture shows Medina emerging from a wave in a vertical pose, as if standing on solid ground, pointing upwards with his right index finger above his head while his surfboard hovers parallel to him, tail down and nose up, tethered to his foot and seemingly mimicking his pose.

Brouillet himself described Medina's pose as giving off a "man, I think this is a 10" vibe; Medina indeed thought he would get the maximum score.

== Impact ==
=== Initial spread and memes ===
Medina posted the picture on his official Instagram profile citing Philippians 4:13 and it received 2.4 million likes within a day, which more than doubled after one more day. One journalist reported seeing Medina's account grow by about 400,000 followers within hours after the picture was posted. By February 2025, it had accumulated over 9 million likes and had been shared by notable fellow athletes like Lewis Hamilton and Neymar. On 7 August 2024, Medina reproduced his gesture in a picture taken in front of the Louvre and shared on his Instagram page.

Despite seeing its potential, Brouillet didn't initially believe the picture would go so viral and was surprised to find so many notifications on his phone when he had a break shortly after sending it. He later said he was happy that the photo helped highlight the sport and compared its impact with pictures taken by Tim McKenna showing American surfer Laird Hamilton in his iconic 2000 big wave ride in Teahupo’o.

The image went viral in the form of memes, including variations in which Medina is flying, is being depicted in places where raising a hand would be ordinary (classroom, bus stop) and is seemingly holding and/or being held by other Brazilian medalists in Paris.

Brazilian office supply brand Tilibra announced it would launch a notebook with the picture as its cover.

=== Reception ===
The photograph was praised for the difficulty of capturing such an image while standing on a moving boat in agitated waters. British newspaper The Guardian described it as "an airborne celebration so well poised it looked too good to be true". The combination of factors composing the image was so unique that some believed that it had been photoshopped or generated by AI.

Writing for Christianity Today, Franco Iacomini commented that while Medina's hand gesture in the picture could simply mean "number 1" (as suggested by Brazilian newscaster Renata Vasconcellos in Jornal Nacional), it could actually be a reference to God; pointing to the sky following a sports achievement is a common gesture among Brazilian evangelical athletes. Although religious manifestations are prohibited in the Olympics, Iacomini noted that fellow Brazilian medalists Rayssa Leal and Caio Bonfim also visually expressed their beliefs during the games.

On Surfer magazine, Ben Mondy pondered that the picture could help bring more attention to shapers, because Medina's board displays nothing but the Brazilian flag and the shaper logo, in line with the Olympic's ban on sponsorship logos other than the equipment manufacturer's.

=== Accolades ===
In 2025, the Golden Moment won the top prize in the World Sports Photography Awards, besides winning gold in the Aquatic category, competing with over 13,000 pictures from 2,200 fellow photographers from around the world.

It was included in Time's list of Top 100 Photos of 2024 and was highlighted on a BBC's "Photos of the week". News.com.au said it "may well be the greatest sports photo of all time" on its Facebook page.
