= Peru at the 2024 Summer Olympics =

- IOC code: PER
- NOC: Peruvian Olympic Committee
- Website: www.coperu.org (in Spanish)

in Paris, France 26 July 2024 – 11 August 2024
- Competitors: 26 (9 men and 17 women) in 9 sports
- Flag bearers (opening): Juan Postigos & María Luisa Doig
- Flag bearers (closing): Stefano Peschiera & María Belén Bazo
- Medals Ranked 84th: Gold 0 Silver 0 Bronze 1 Total 1

Summer Olympics appearances (overview)
- 1900; 1904–1932; 1936; 1948; 1952; 1956; 1960; 1964; 1968; 1972; 1976; 1980; 1984; 1988; 1992; 1996; 2000; 2004; 2008; 2012; 2016; 2020; 2024; 2028

Peru competed at the 2024 Summer Olympics in Paris from 26 July to 11 August 2024. Since the nation's official debut in 1936, Peruvian athletes have appeared in every edition of the Summer Olympic Games, except for Helsinki 1952.

== Medalists ==
Medal	Name	Sport	Event	Date
Bronze	Stefano Peschiera	Sailing	Men's ILCA 7	7 August

== Competitors ==
The following is the list of number of competitors in the Games.

Sport	Men	Women	Total
Athletics	3	6	9
Badminton	0	1	1
Fencing	0	1	1
Judo	1	0	1
Rowing	0	3	3
Sailing	1	2	3
Shooting	1	1	2
Surfing	2	1	3
Swimming	1	2	3
Total	9	17	26

== Athletics ==
Peruvian track and field athletes achieved the entry standards for Paris 2024, either by passing the direct qualifying mark (or time for track and road races) or by world ranking, in the following events (a maximum of 3 athletes each):

Key

- Note–Ranks given for track events are within the athlete's heat only
- Q = Qualified for the next round
- q = Qualified for the next round as a fastest loser or, in field events, by position without achieving the qualifying target
- NR = National record
- N/A = Round not applicable for the event
- Bye = Athlete not required to compete in round

Track and road events

Athlete	Event	Heat		Repechage		Semifinal		Final	
Athlete	Event	Result	Rank	Result	Rank	Result	Rank	Result	Rank
Cristhian Pacheco	Men's marathon	—N/a						DNF	
Luis Henry Campos	Men's 20 km walk	—N/a						1:22:00 SB	26
César Rodríguez	Men's 20 km walk	—N/a						DNF	
Luz Mery Rojas	Women's marathon	—N/a						2:37:24	62
Gladys Tejeda	Women's marathon	—N/a						2:35:36 SB	56
Thalia Valdivia	Women's marathon	—N/a						2:29:01	18
Mary Luz Andía	Women's 20 km walk	—N/a						1:29:24	12
Kimberly García	Women's 20 km walk	—N/a						1:30:10	16
Evelyn Inga	Women's 20 km walk	—N/a						1:28:16	8
César Rodríguez; Kimberly García	Mixed marathon walk relay	—N/a						2:51:56	4

== Badminton ==
Peru entered one badminton players into the Olympic tournament based on the BWF Race to Paris Rankings.

Athlete	Event	Group stage			Elimination	Quarter-final	Semi-final	Final / BM	
Athlete	Event	Opposition Score	Opposition Score	Rank	Opposition Score	Opposition Score	Opposition Score	Opposition Score	Rank
Inés Castillo	Women's singles	Arın (TUR); L 0–2	Ohori (JPN); L 0–2	3	Did not advance				=27

== Fencing ==
Peru qualified one female fencer to the 2024 Summer Olympics through the Zonal Panamerican Olympic Qualifier Tournament 2024, held in San José, Costa Rica.

Athlete	Event	Round of 64	Round of 32	Round of 16	Quarterfinal	Semifinal	Final / BM	
Athlete	Event	Opposition Score	Opposition Score	Opposition Score	Opposition Score	Opposition Score	Opposition Score	Rank
María Luisa Doig	Women's épée	Tikanah (SGP); L 14–15	Did not advance					33

== Judo ==
Peru qualified one judoka for the following weight class at the Games. Juan Postigos (men's half-lightweight, 66 kg) got qualified via continental quota based on Olympic point rankings.

Athlete	Event	Round of 64	Round of 32	Round of 16	Quarterfinals	Semifinals	Repechage	Final / BM	
Athlete	Event	Opposition Result	Opposition Result	Opposition Result	Opposition Result	Opposition Result	Opposition Result	Opposition Result	Rank
Juan Postigos	Men's –66 kg	—N/a	Piras (ITA); L 00–10	Did not advance					=17

== Rowing ==
Peruvian rowers qualified two boats, each in the women's single and lightweight double sculls for the Games, through the 2024 Americas Qualification Regatta in Rio de Janeiro, Brazil.

Athlete	Event	Heats		Repechage		Semifinals		Final	
Athlete	Event	Time	Rank	Time	Rank	Time	Rank	Time	Rank
Adriana Sanguineti	Women's single sculls	8:03.87	5 R	8:07.05	2 QF	8:17.84	5 FD	7:49.31	24
Alessia Palacios; Valeria Palacios	Women's lightweight double sculls	7:32.68	3 R	7:28.58	4 FC	Did not advance		7:12.27	14

Qualification Legend: FA=Final A (medal); FB=Final B (non-medal); FC=Final C (non-medal); FD=Final D (non-medal); FE=Final E (non-medal); FF=Final F (non-medal); SA/B=Semifinals A/B; SC/D=Semifinals C/D; SE/F=Semifinals E/F; QF=Quarterfinals; R=Repechage

== Sailing ==
Peruvian sailors qualified one boat in each of the following classes through the 2023 Sailing World Championships in The Hague, Netherlands; 2023 Pan American Games in Santiago, Chile; and through por Reallocation.

Elimination events

Athlete	Event	Race																				Net points	Rank	Race													Final rank
Athlete	Event	1	2	3	4	5	6	7	8	9	10	11	12	13	14	15	16	17	18	19	20	Net points	Rank	QF	SF1	SF2	SF3	SF4	SF5	SF6	F1	F2	F3	F4	F5	F6	Final rank
María Belén Bazo	Women's iQFoil	4	4	8	12	7	12	8	~~21~~	11	6	5	18.5	7.5	~~20.5~~	Cancelled						103	7 QF	2 SF	3 EL	—N/a					EL	—N/a					4

Medal race events

Athlete	Event	Race																Net points	Final rank
Athlete	Event	1	2	3	4	5	6	7	8	9	10	11	12	13	14	15	M*	Net points	Final rank
Stefano Peschiera	Men's ILCA 7	6	1	14	11	~~20~~	14	12	4	Cancelled		—N/a					18	80	3rd place, bronze medalist(s)
Florencia Chiarella	Women's ILCA 6	29	30	21	32	35	11	26	12	~~39~~	Cancelled	—N/a					EL	196	32

M = Medal race; EL = Eliminated – did not advance into the medal race

== Shooting ==
Peruvian shooters achieved quota places for the following events based on their results at the 2022 and 2023 ISSF World Championships, 2022 and 2024 Championships of the Americas, 2023 Pan American Games, and 2024 ISSF World Olympic Qualification Tournament.

Athlete	Event	Qualification		Final	
Athlete	Event	Points	Rank	Points	Rank
Nicolás Pacheco	Men's skeet	122	6	17	6
Daniella Borda	Women's skeet	116	19	Did not advance	
Nicolás Pacheco; Daniella Borda	Mixed skeet team	139	13	Did not advance	

== Surfing ==
Peruvian surfers confirmed three shortboard quota place for Tahiti. Tokyo 2020 Olympian Lucca Mesinas assured his nomination to the team as the highest ranked unqualified athlete in men's shortboard at the 2023 Pan American Games in Santiago, Chile. Meanwhile, Sol Aguirre and Alonso Correa qualified for the games, after obtaining one of eight eligible spots, for women's; and one of six eligible spots, for men's; through the 2024 World Surfing Games in Arecibo, Puerto Rico.

Athlete	Event	Round 1		Round 2	Round 3	Quarterfinal	Semifinal	Final / BM	
Athlete	Event	Score	Rank	Opposition Result	Opposition Result	Opposition Result	Opposition Result	Opposition Result	Rank
Alonso Correa	Men's shortboard	14.33	1 R3	Bye	Smith (RSA); W 15.00–12.20	Inaba (JPN); W 10.50–10.16	Vaast (FRA); L 9.60–10.96	Medina (BRA); L 12.43–15.54	4
Lucca Mesinas	Men's shortboard	11.10	3 R2	Robinson (AUS); L 10.83–16.87	Did not advance				=17
Sol Aguirre	Women's shortboard	4.30	2 R2	Siqi (CHN); L 4.50–8.67	Did not advance				=17

== Swimming ==
Peru qualified two swimmers; one in the women's 10 km marathon swimming event, after World Aquatics announced the reallocation of a place in the women's 10 km marathon swimming event at the upcoming Paris 2024 Olympic Games; Peru received two Universality quota places in Swimming. Joaquín Vargas (men's 400 metre freestyle) and McKenna DeBever (women's 200 metre individual medley) received the Universality Quota places.

Athlete	Event	Heat		Semifinal		Final	
Athlete	Event	Time	Rank	Time	Rank	Time	Rank
Joaquín Vargas	Men's 400 m freestyle	3:54.59	29	—N/a		Did not advance	
McKenna DeBever	Women's 200 m medley	2:17.61	29	Did not advance			
María Bramont-Arias	Women's 10 km open water	—N/a				2:12:44.7	21
