= Surfing at the 2028 Summer Olympics =

Surfing at the Games of the XXXIV Olympiad
- Venue: Trestles State Beach, San Clemente, California
- Dates: 15 – 18 July 2028
- No. of events: 2 (1 men, 1 women)
- Competitors: 48

Surfing at the 2028 Summer Olympics is scheduled to be held on 15 – 18 July in Trestles State Beach, San Clemente, California.

== Qualification ==
The qualification system for surfing at the LA28 Olympic Games consists of 48 quota places, with 24 places allocated for men and 24 for women, including host country and universality places. The qualification pathway prioritizes the 2027–2028 World Surf League Championship Tour, the 2028 ISA World Surfing Games, continental representation events through continental multi-event games and 2027 ISA World Surfing Games. Eight men and eight women will qualify through the World Surf League Championship Tour, subject to a maximum of one athlete per country. A further seven athletes per gender will qualify through the 2028 ISA World Surfing Games, also with a maximum of one athlete per country. Five quota places per gender are allocated through continental representation, comprising events for Africa, Oceania, Asia, the Americas, and Europe. Additional quota places are awarded to the National Olympic Committees of the highest-ranked teams at the 2026 and 2027 ISA World Surfing Games, subject to the specified qualification conditions. The United States is guaranteed one host-country place per gender if it has not already obtained a qualification place, while one universality place per gender is also available to eligible NOCs. The qualification period runs from September 2026 to June 2028, with the final quota allocations and subsequent confirmation and reallocation procedures completed before the LA28 Games.

== Medal summary ==
=== Medal table ===
* Host nation (United States)

Rank	NOC	Gold	Silver	Bronze	Total
1	United States*	0	0	0	0
Totals (1 entries)		0	0	0	0

=== Medalists ===
Event	Gold	Silver	Bronze
Men's shortboard			
Women's shortboard			
