= Kauli Vaast =

French surfer from French Polynesia

Personal information
- Born: 26 February 2002 (age 24) Vairao, Tahiti, French Polynesia
- Height: 176 cm (5 ft 9 in)
- Weight: 70 kg (154 lb)

Surfing career
- Sport: Surfing
- Sponsors: Red Bull, Quiksilver
- Major achievements: 2025 Challenger Series champion; 2024 Olympics Gold Medal

Surfing specifications
- Stance: Goofy
Medal record
Men's surfing
Representing France
Olympic Games
Gold medal – first place	2024 Paris	Shortboard
World Games
Silver medal – second place	2023 La Bocana	Team
Silver medal – second place	2024 Arecibo	Team
Silver medal – second place	2025 Surf City	Men
Bronze medal – third place	2024 Arecibo	Men

Kauli Vaast (born 26 February 2002) is a French professional surfer from French Polynesia. He qualified for the 2024 Olympic Games, where he won the gold medal in the men's competition.

== Early life ==
Vaast was born in the town of Vairao on the island of Tahiti in French Polynesia. He has two younger siblings, a sister and a brother. His sister, Aelan, is also a professional surfer. Vaast first rode on a surfboard with his father when he was four years old, and began surfing on his own when he was six. When he was eight, Vaast surfed Teahupo'o for the first time, and won a local surfing competition, motivating him to train competitively as a surfer in France.

== Career ==
Vaast is a three-time WSL European Junior Champion (2017, 2019, and 2020).

In 2019, Vaast was victorious against Hawaiian surfer Tyler Newton at the 2019 Tahiti Pro Trials, winning a wildcard appearance at Tahiti Pro Teahupo'o 2019. There, he advanced to the Round of 16, where he was defeated by Jérémy Florès.

Vaast placed second in the Outerknown Tahiti Pro 2022, behind Miguel Pupo.

In 2023, he made his first WQS win in Morocco, at the Rip Curl Pro Search Taghazout Bay.

Vaast qualified for the 2024 Olympics at the 2023 ISA World Surfing Games, defeating Spanish surfer Gonzalo Gutiérrez to claim the European slot.

As a replacement for Ítalo Ferreira, who withdrew due to injury, Vaast placed fifth in the SHISEIDO Tahiti Pro 2023, behind Leonardo Fioravanti.

At the 2024 ISA World Surfing Games, Vaast won the bronze medal, placing behind Gabriel Medina and Ramzi Boukhiam.

Vaast won the 2024 Paris Summer Olympics men's shortboard event.

In the 2025 Challenger Series, Vaast achieved his first-ever qualification to compete in the Championship Tour of 2026 World Surf League, finishing in first place overall in this event.

== Sponsorships ==
In 2024, Vaast was appointed as a brand ambassador for the French fashion brand Dior.

== Results ==
=== Victories ===
WSL Challenger Series Wins
Year	Event	Venue	Country
2025	EDP Ericeira Pro	Ribeira D'Ilhas, Ericeira	Portugal
WQS Wins
Year	Event	Venue	Country
2025	TOA Pro	Paparā, Tahiti	French Polynesia
2023	Rip Curl Pro Search Taghazout Bay	Anchor Point, Taghazout Bay	Morocco
Juniors Tour
Year	Event	Venue	Country
2022	Azores Pro Junior	Santa Barbara, Azores	Portugal
2020	Junior Pro Espinho	Espinho, Porto	Portugal
2019	Caparica Surf Fest Junior Pro	Praia de Caparica, Lisbon	Portugal
2019	Papara Pro Junior Tahiti	Paparā, Tahiti	French Polynesia (France)
2018	Papara Pro Junior Tahiti	Paparā, Tahiti	French Polynesia (France)
2017	Junior Pro Biscarrosse	Biscarrosse, Nouvelle-Aquitaine	France

== Awards and honours ==
Orders

- Knight of the Legion of Honour: 2024
