= Deutsche Schule Lissabon =

Location
- Lisbon; Portugal
- 38.7586°N 9.1636°W

Information
- Established: 1848; 178 years ago
- Director: Teresa Salgueiro Lenze
- Grades: Kindergarten – 12th (Abitur)
- Language: German
- Website: www.dslissabon.com

Deutsche Schule Lissabon (Portuguese: Escola Alemã de Lisboa, EAL; German School of Lisbon) is a private German international school situated in the Lumiar district of Lisbon, Portugal. Founded in 1848, the Deutsche Schule Lissabon is the oldest German school in the Iberian Peninsula.

The school consists of a primary school with kindergarten and a secondary school. Whilst the primary school is mostly attended by German pupils the secondary school is not. In addition to the main campus in Lisbon there is also a campus in Estoril, Cascais.

== History ==
The school was founded in 1848 and is thus the oldest German school on the Iberian peninsula. However, the school was founded more than once, other dates being 1895, when it was reopened after being closed for economic reasons for some years, 1922 when it was reopened after World War I, and in 1952 when it was reopened after world War II. The current location and the main buildings were inaugurated in 1963.

== Schooling ==
The German School consists of a kindergarten, a primary and a secondary school in Lisbon plus a kindergarten and primary school in Estoril, some 30 km outside Lisbon, where many German immigrants live.

In Lisbon, the primary school is physically divided from the secondary school: they have their own playgrounds etc. The buildings of the current primary school were inaugurated in 2008; the former buildings now accommodate the formerly overcrowded kindergartens.

=== Primary school ===
After kindergarten the pupils go to the primary school which has grades 1 to 4. Usually there are two classes for each grade with around 20-25 pupils each. In primary school the pupils are mostly Germans, of German descendants or Portuguese children who had previously lived in Germany and thus speak German already. Classes are taught in German. Portuguese classes start in the second grade as "PaF", "Portugiesisch als Fremdsprache" ("Portuguese for foreigners"). After primary school the pupils are evaluated and a recommendation is made in which of the three categories of the German school system they should continue.(Hauptschule, Realschule, Gymnasium). However, the DSL does not have different classes for the categories, but students that are Haupt- or Realschule get a bonus on their marks.

=== Secondary school ===
Beginning with the fifth grade, each year has four classes, two with German as the main language and two further in Portuguese; thus it is able to call itself a "Begegnungsschule" ("school of encounters").

Whilst the two lines are separated at first, the pupils are mixed again in the seventh grade, whereafter more and more subjects are taught to mixed German/Portuguese classes, beginning in the seventh grade with subjects such as English, French, music, arts etc.

In the tenth grade the classes are mixed again according to the subjects that pupils choose (biology, chemistry, French, art, music, etc.).

The school ends after the Abitur, which is held at the end of the twelfth grade. The Abitur allows the pupils to attend any university in Germany. To attend Universities in Portugal, students must take special classes (called Equivalência) during the last years of attendance, which will teach them subjects necessary to later on attend a university in Portugal.

== Student body ==
As of 2009 the school had 1,154 students. 60% of the students were Portuguese. Germans made up most of the remaining students. As of 2009 many German students have parents working for the German embassy and/or for German companies such as Siemens and Volkswagen. Those students tend to stay for around two to three years; once their parents' jobs move, they leave EAL.

== Deutsche Schule Estoril ==
The School has a small dependency in Estoril/Cascais some 30 km outside Lisbon called Deutsche Schule Estoril/Escola Alemã do Estoril. It has a kindergarten and first to third (previously until fourth) grade classes. After third grade pupils have to go to the school in Lisbon.

The school is in an old villa and attended almost entirely by German pupils. Since space in the school is very limited many German children in the area have to go to Lisbon anyway, which means getting up around two hours earlier for a one-hour drive to the main school. For many years plans to expand the Estoril branch have been in place but nothing has happened so far.

The school has its own headmaster but is officially a part of the school in Lisbon.

DSL seen from the Air

Vorplatz Aula

The new Sports Arena

The Pond

B-Trakt

== Notable alumni ==
- Alba Baptista, Portuguese actress
- Manuel Cortez, German-Portuguese actor and director
- Herman José, German-Portuguese comedian
- Patrick Knapp Schwarzenegger, Austrian-American attorney, businessman and investor
