= Tatiana Weston-Webb =

Brazilian surfer (born 1996)

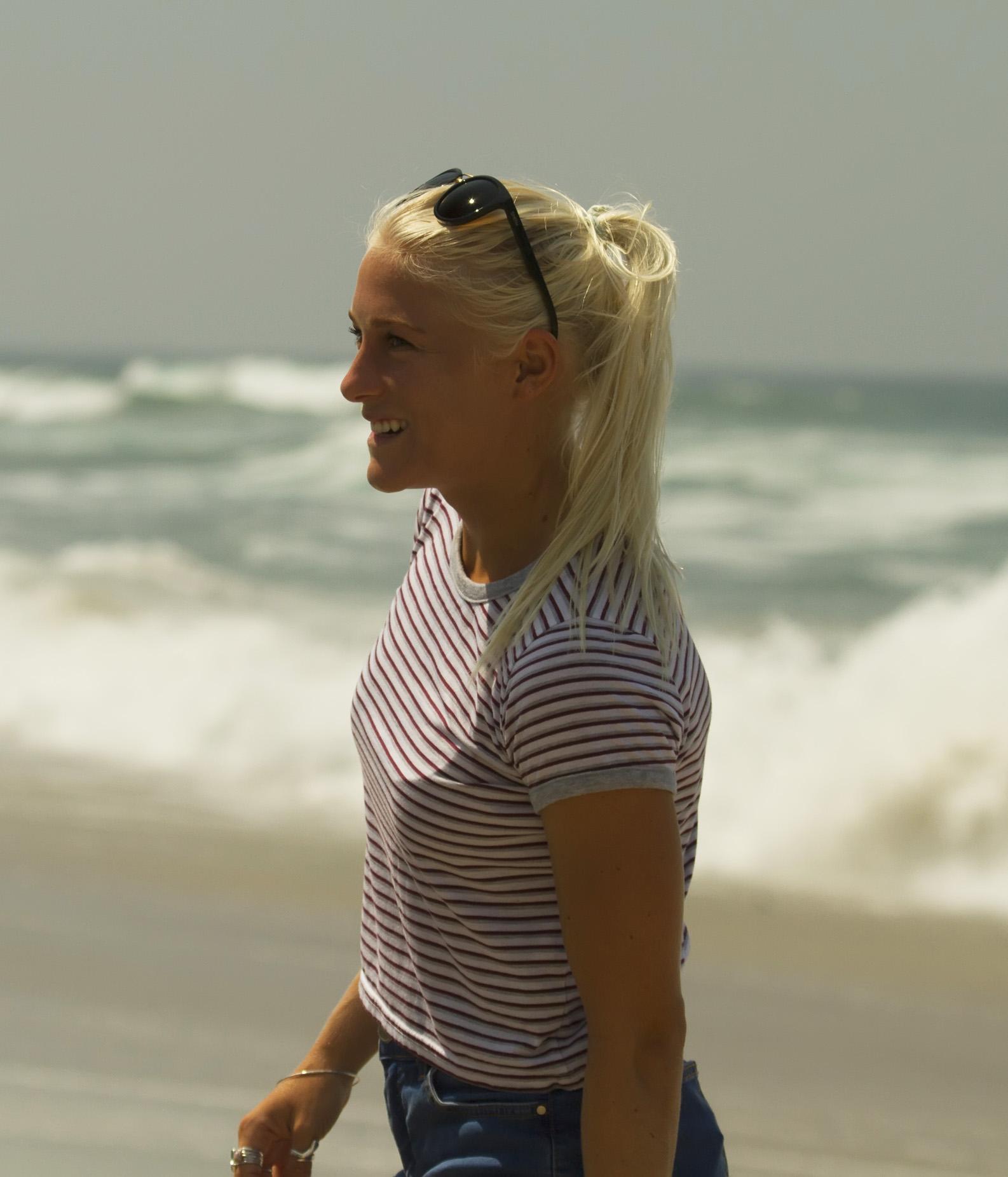
- Weston-Webb at the Supergirl Pro Surf Contest in Oceanside

Personal information
- Born: Tatiana Guimarães Weston-Webb; May 9, 1996 (age 30) Porto Alegre, Rio Grande do Sul, Brazil
- Height: 5 ft 4 in (163 cm)
- Weight: 123 lb (56 kg)

Surfing career
- Sport: Surfing
- Best year: 2021 - Ranked #2 WSL World Tour
- Sponsors: Body Glove, Sharp Eye Surfboards, Banzai Bowls, Sticky Bumps, Rockstar Energy Drink, Oi, UAG
- Major achievements: 2024 Olympics silver Medal; WSL Championship Tour event wins: 4; 2023 ISA World Surfing Games Champion; 2015 WSL Rookie of the Year; 1x US Open of Surfing champion (2016)

Surfing specifications
- Stance: Goofy
- Shaper: Sharp Eye Surfboards
Medal record
Women's surfing
Representing Brazil
Olympic Games
| Silver medal – second place | 2024 Paris | Shortboard |
Pan American Games
| Gold medal – first place | 2023 Santiago | Shortboard |
World Games
| Gold medal – first place | 2019 Miyazaki | Team |
| Gold medal – first place | 2023 La Bocana | Women |
| Gold medal – first place | 2024 Arecibo | Team |
| Silver medal – second place | 2024 Arecibo | Women |
| Bronze medal – third place | 2023 La Bocana | Team |

Tatiana "Tati" Guimarães Weston-Webb (born May 9, 1996) is a Brazilian surfer based in Kauaʻi, Hawaii. She is also both American and English. She was the only rookie on the professional surfing World Championship Tour in 2015. Weston-Webb wears jersey number 9, and her 2016 'CT rank is number 4. She competed in both the 2020 and 2024 Summer Olympics for Brazil, winning silver in the latter and because of that she became the first woman surfer from Brazil to win a medal at the Olympics.

== Personal life ==
Weston-Webb's father, Douglas Weston-Webb, was born in England, a descendant of a family engaged in the textile business. The Weston-Webb name is a heritable double-barrelled surname, created through the marriage of two children from significant families in that industry. He moved at an early age to the U.S. state of Florida, where he was raised. He learned to surf at age eight and later became a "surf bum" and relocated to Kauaʻi in his 20s.

Weston-Webb's mother, Tanira Weston-Webb (née Guimarães), was a Brazilian professional body boarder, under sponsorship by two industry companies. Tanira's sister, Andrea Guimarães, was also a bodyboarder.

Douglas and Tanira met while she was in Hawaii. They moved to Brazil, where Tatiana was born in 1996, in Porto Alegre. Because of her father's birth in the United Kingdom, Tatiana also automatically acquired British citizenship by descent at birth. However, she has not applied for a British passport, and her father has not renewed his in many years.

Within two months of her birth in Brazil, Weston-Webb and her parents moved to Hawaii. At age 8, while watching her older brother Troy surf, Tatiana decided to take up the sport as well. Surfing became a competition between the children, and Tatiana received her first surfboard soon afterward.

In 2011, she played 11-year-old Bethany Hamilton in the film Soul Surfer.

In 2020, she married longtime boyfriend Jessé Mendes dos Santos, a Brazilian fellow professional surfer from Guarujá, São Paulo, who competes under the name Jessé Mendes. The pair married in an intimate beachfront ceremony held at the Princeville Resort, a Kauaʻi hotel her father had worked at for many years, after the security guard allowed them to use the otherwise expensive site at no cost during the property's renovation. Weston-Webb gave birth to a daughter in 2026.

== Competition background ==
In 2015 Weston-Webb secured a spot in the World Championship Tour.

On April 29, 2018, she announced her switch to Brazil representation for the remainder of the 2018 WSL Championship Tour season, aiming to compete representing her native country in the 2020 Summer Olympics in Tokyo, one of her dreams since surfing was announced as an official Olympic sport. Weston-Webb ended her Tokyo campaign in the round of 16. In the 2024 Summer Olympics, Weston-Webb reached the final, and only lost the gold to world champion Caroline Marks by a score of 0.18.

On March 27, 2025, Weston-Webb announced she was taking a break from the World Championship Tour for mental health reasons.

== Career Victories ==
WCT Wins
| Year | Event | Venue | Country |
| 2022 | J-Bay Open | Jeffreys Bay, Eastern Cap | South Africa |
| 2022 | MEO Pro Portugal | Supertubos, Peniche | Portugal |
| 2021 | Boost Mobile Margaret River Pro | Margaret River, Western Australia | Australia |
| 2016 | Vans US Open of Surfing | Huntington Beach, California | United States |
WQS Wins
| Year | Event | Venue | Country |
| 2015 | Paul Mitchell Supergirl Pro | Oceanside Pier, California | United States |
| 2014 | Mahalo Surf Eco Festival | Itacaré, Bahia | Brazil |
Juniors Wins
| Year | Event | Venue | Country |
| 2014 | Chain Resources Women's Pro Junior | New Plymouth, Taranaki | New Zealand |
| 2013 | North Shore Surf Shop Pro Junior | Banzai Pipeline, Oahu | Hawaii |

== Media coverage ==
- 2016 Surfer Magazine Hot 100 #1 Women
- 2015 Free Surf Magazine Cover
- 2015 Surfing Magazine Body Glove ad
- 2014 Surfing Magazine online
- 2014 Featured on ASP website
- 2014 Surfline editorial
- 2014 Surfing magazine April issue

== Competitive highlights ==
- 2016 4th place WSL Championship Tour Final Ratings
- 2016 3rd place WSL/ CT Roxy Pro France
- 2016 1st place Vans US Open of Surfing
- 2016 3rd place WSL/ CT Drug Aware Margaret River Pro
- 2016 3rd place WSL/ CT Rip Curl Women’s Pro Bells Beach
- 2015 WSL/ Championship Tour Rookie of the Year
- 2015 7th place WSL Championship Tour Final Ratings
- 2015 5th place WSL/ CT Target Maui Pro HI
- 2015 2nd place WSL/ CT Roxy Pro France
- 2015 3rd place WSL/ CT Cascais Women’s Pro
- 2015 1st in the overall rating for the WSL Qualifying Series
- 2015 5th place WSL/ CT Women’s Drug Aware Margaret River Pro
- 2015 5th place WSL/ CT Fiji Women’s Pro
- 2015 1st place WSL/ QS Paul Mitchell Super Girl Pro
- 2015 3rd place WSL/ CT Snapper Pro
- 2015 3rd place WSL/ QS Hurley Australian Open
- 2015 3rd place WSL/ QS Samsung Galaxy Hainan Pro
- 2014 Qualified to the WSL Championship Tour
- 2014 3rd place ASP/ QS Swatch Girls Pro
- 2014 GoPro winner at the CT Fiji event
- 2014 3rd place ASP/ QS Port Taranaki Pro
- 2014 2nd place ASP/ QS Super Girl Pro
- 2014 1st place ISA World Junior Champs
- 2013 1st place ISA World Junior Champs
- 2013 1st place Surfing America Championships
- 2013 3rd place ASP US Open Pro Juniors
- 2013 3rd place ASP/ QS Pantin Classic
- 2013 2nd place ASP World Junior Champs
- 12th overall on the ASP Women’s World ranking (*one spot from qualification to the ASP WCT)
