= Vahiné Fierro =

French Polynesian surfer

Personal information
- Born: 2 December 1999 (age 26) Uturoa, Raiatea, French Polynesia

Surfing career
- Sport: Surfing
- Major achievements: WSL Championship Tour event wins: 1; 2017 WSL World Junior Champion
Medal record
Women's surfing
Representing France
World Games
Gold medal – first place	2021 La Bocana	Team
Silver medal – second place	2023 La Bocana	Team
Silver medal – second place	2024 Arecibo	Team
Bronze medal – third place	2022 Huntington Beach	Team

Vahiné Fierro (born 2 December 1999 in Uturoa) is a French professional surfer from French Polynesia, France. She was World Junior champion in 2017. She qualified for the 2024 Olympic Games.

== Biography ==
Vahiné began to learn to surf at the age of 2 and has been competing since the age of 14. There being no lycée on her own island of Huahine, she moved to Tahiti for secondary education and afterwards moved to Europe to compete there.

She qualified for the 2024 Olympics at the 2023 World Surfing Games in Salvador, as the best previously unqualified European competitor. As noted by surfing media, the Olympic surfing competition is scheduled to be held at Teahupo'o, where she trains.

== Career Victories ==
WCT Wins
Year	Event	Venue	Country
2024	SHISEIDO Tahiti Pro	Teahupo'o, Tahiti	French Polynesia
WSL Qualifying Series Wins
Year	Event	Venue	Country
2017	Turtle Bay Resort Pro	Turtle Bay, Oahu	United States of America
Juniors Wins
Year	Event	Venue	Country
2017	Jeep World Junior Championship	Kiama, New South Wales	Australia
2017	Papara Pro Vahine Junior Tahiti	Papara, Tahiti	French Polynesia
