= Alan Cleland =

Mexican surfer (born 2002)

Personal information
- Full name: Alan George Cleland Quiñonez
- Born: 19 June 2002 (age 24) Boca de Pascuales, Colima, Mexico

Surfing career
- Sport: Surfing
- Best year: 2025 - Ranked #19 WSL CT World Tour
- Sponsors: TPatterson Surfboards, Oakley, Futures, Proline, Nixon
- Major achievements: 2023 ISA World Surfing Games Champion; 1x US Open of Surfing champion (2024)

Surfing specifications
- Stance: Regular
Medal record
Surfing
Representing Mexico
World Surfing Games
Gold medal – first place	2023 La Bocana	Men
World Junior Championship
Silver medal – second place	2019 Huntington Beach	Under-18

Alan George Cleland Quiñonez (born 19 June 2002) is a Mexican surfer. He won a gold medal at the 2023 ISA World Surfing Games and is qualified to compete at the 2024 Summer Olympics. In October 2026, Cleland was suspended from competition following sexual assault allegations

== Early life ==
Cleland was born in the beachside town of Boca de Pascuales, Colima, Mexico, to a Mexican mother and an American father. His father, Alan Cleland Sr., was a pro surfer from the San Diego area who moved to Boca de Pascuales and married a local woman. Alan Jr. did not begin learning English until he was six years old, and he attended a public primary school before switching to a home school curriculum.

Cleland began surfing at a young age in his hometown, which is known for its rough waters, though he soon moved to California to further develop his talent. In 2014, he began representing his birth country in competitions.

== Career ==
Cleland began competing on the World Surf League (WSL) Men's Junior Tour in 2015. The following year, at the age of 14, he competed in the under-18 category at the ISA World Junior Championship. Cleland made his WSL Qualifying Series debut in 2017, placing 25th at the Powerade Surf Open in Acapulco. He also took first place in the under-16 category. At the 2017 ISA World Junior Championship, Cleland competed in both the under-16 and under-18 categories after capturing national titles at both age groups. He finished in third place in the juvenile category at the 2018 US Open of Surfing. In 2019, Cleland won a silver medal in the under-18 category at the ISA World Junior Championship, which was held in Huntington Beach, California. In 2022, Cleland earned his first WSL Junior Tour victory at the Live Like Zander Junior Pro in Barbados.

Cleland won the gold medal at the 2023 ISA World Surfing Games in El Salvador, becoming the second Mexican man to win gold at the event (after Jhony Corzo in 2017). He recorded three of the top ten highest-scoring waves of the competition, including a 9.73 in the final. Two months later in August 2023, Cleland officially qualified for the 2024 Summer Olympics. Since Jordy Smith of South Africa earned qualification both through the World Surfing Games (WSG) and the WSL Championship Tour, his WSG slot as the highest-finishing African surfer would normally have been given to the next ranked African, which was Teva Bouchgua of Morocco. However, the qualification system required a top 30 placement and Bouchgua finished 31st, meaning the WSG slot was re-allocated to the highest-finishing eligible surfer, regardless of continent, which was Cleland. He became the first Mexican surfer to qualify for the Olympics.

== Legal issues ==
In October 2026, Cleland was suspended from competition following sexual assault allegations at a party in Tahiti in August 2026. According to the report, the event allegedly happened "after the final day of the Outerknown Tahiti Pro and involved a teenaged Australian female surfer and at least three men". New South Wales Police and French Polynesian Police are investigating the report. The following day, October 12, Cleland's ex-girlfriend, German professional surfer Noah Klapp, publicly accused him of physical, sexual, and psychological abuse during their relationship. Cleland's sponsors, Quiksilver and Monster, subsequently removed him from their websites, and the WSL removed Cleland's jersey from its online store. On the 14 October, the International Surfing Association decided to provisionally suspend Alan Cleland "due to recent reports of serious allegations of abuse within the surfing community". “The ISA Executive Committee has decided to provisionally suspend the athlete in question from participating in ISA-sanctioned events, pending further investigation and review, in accordance with applicable rules and ISA safeguard procedures,” the statement said.

== Results ==
=== Victories ===
WSL Challenger Series Wins
Year	Event	Venue	Country
2024	Lexus US Open of Surfing presented by Pacifico	Huntington Beach, California	USA

Juniors Tour
Year	Event	Venue	Country
2022	Live Like Zander Junior Pro	Soup Bowl, Bathsheba	Barbados
