= Matthew McGillivray (surfer) =

South African surfer (born 1997)

Matt McGillivray
Personal information
- Born: 26 March 1997 (age 28) Port Elizabeth, South Africa
- Height: 180 cm (5 ft 11 in)
- Weight: 86 kg (190 lb)

Surfing career
- Sport: Surfing
- Best year: 2022 – Ranked #13 WSL CT World Tour
- Sponsors: Visla, Cisurf, Virtualstax
- Major achievements: 2018 Seat Pro Netanya; 2018 Vans Surf Pro Classic

Surfing specifications
- Stance: Natural (regular foot)

Matthew "Matt" McGillivray (born 26 March 1997) is a South African professional surfer, competing on the World championship tour surfing (WCT).

He was born and schooled in Gqeberha (formerly Port Elizabeth) in the Eastern Cape province of South Africa, matriculating at Grey High School in 2015.

He qualified for the 2024 Olympic Games.

He has been described as a "Madman" in this WSL video.

== Career Victories ==
WQS Wins
Year	Event	Venue	Country
2018	Vans Surf Pro Classic	Lamberts Bay, Western Cape	South Africa
2018	Seat Pro Netanya pres by Reef	Kontiki Beach, Netanya	Israel
