= Luana Silva =

Brazilian-American surfer

Personal information
- Full name: Luana Coelho Silva
- Born: 7 May 2004 (age 22) Honolulu, Hawaii, U.S.

Surfing career
- Sport: Surfing
- Best year: 2024 - Ranked #12 WSL World Tour
- Major achievements: 2024 World Junior championship

Surfing specifications
- Stance: Regular
Medal record
Women's surfing
Representing Brazil
World Games
Gold medal – first place	2024 Arecibo	Team
Bronze medal – third place	2023 La Bocana	Team

Luana Coelho Silva (born 7 May 2004) is a Brazilian-American professional surfer. She competes in the elite (top 16) of the World Surf League. She was born in Honolulu, Hawaii. She qualified for the 2024 Olympic Games.

In January 2025 she won the 2025 WSL World Junior champions held in San Juan, Philippines.

== Career victories ==
WSL Challenger Series Wins
Year	Event	Venue	Country
2021	MEO Vissla Pro Ericeira	Ribeira D'Ilhas, Ericeira	Portugal
