= Camilla Kemp =

Portuguese born German surfer

- Born: 30 January 1996 (age 30); Cascais, Portugal
- Education: Deutsche Schule Lissabon
- Occupation: Surfer
- Known for: First German Olympic surfer
- Website: German site

Camilla Kemp (born 30 January 1996) is a Portuguese-born German surfer. She became the German champion in 2023. She competed in the 2024 Olympics in Tahiti.

== Biography ==
Her mother was German and her father was Dutch and they sent her for an education to the Deutsche Schule Lissabon. She was brought up near the coast and surf of the west coast of Portugal. It was here that she took up surfing. She had an elder brother and under his influence she found her love for surfing.

She competed initially for Portugal but she did not find much support. The German Surfing Association were very keen to find an athlete with a German passport who had learned to surf from an early age. She found her home among a mix of surfers who shared German nationality. She felt at home and her sex has not an issue as it had been in Portugal. She began a three year wait and in 2020 she changed her sporting allegiance from Portugal to Germany. It was approved by the International Olympic Committee.

In 2021, Kemp and the German American Rachel Presti, became the first German surfers to qualify for the Challenger Series of the World Surf League. In September 2023, she won the German surfing championship title. At the ISA World Surfing Games in Arecibo in Puerto Rico in March 2024, Kemp reached eleventh place and she and Tim Elter qualified as the German representatives for the Olympics.

In 2024, she became the first surfer to compete for Germany at an Olympics. She still lives near and surfs on the Praia do Guincho in Portugal. The surfing for the 2024 Paris Olympics took place in Tahiti and she had to travel 15,000 miles to get there. She surfed on the famed Teahupoʻo waves which were the strongest she had ever experienced. She signed a petition against the construction of a TV tower to allow broadcasters close ups of the Olympic competition. She was in two minds as the tower, which was built, gives the athletes more exposure.

== Personal life ==
As of 2025, Kemp is in a relationship with English footballer Georgia Stanway.
