= 2022 ISA World Surfing Games =

2022 surfing competition

- Location: Huntington Beach, CA, United States
- Date: September 16–24, 2022

The 2022 ISA World Surfing Games took place in Huntington Beach, California, from September 16 to 24, 2022. The event was organized by the International Surfing Association (ISA), and it was the first time it had been held in "Surf City, USA" since 2006.

== Medal summary ==
=== Medalists ===
| Event | Gold | Silver | Bronze |
|---|---|---|---|
| Men | Kanoa Igarashi; Japan | Rio Waida; Indonesia | Jackson Baker; Australia |
| Women | Kirra Pinkerton; United States | Pauline Ado; France | Sally Fitzgibbons; Australia |
| Aloha Cup | France; Gatien Delahaye; Tessa Thyssen; Vahiné Fierro; Timothé Bisso | United States; Griffin Colapinto; Zoë McDougall; Gabriela Bryan; Kolohe Andino | Argentina; Leandro Usuna; Ornella Pellizzari; Lucía Indurain; Santiago Muñiz |
| Team Points | United States; Kolohe Andino; Griffin Colapinto; Nat Young; Gabriela Bryan; Zoë McDougall; Kirra Pinkerton | Australia; Jackson Baker; Liam O'Brien; Callum Robson; Sally Fitzgibbons; Sophie McCulloch; India Robinson | France; Timothé Bisso; Mihimana Braye; Gatien Delahaye; Pauline Ado; Vahiné Fierro; Tessa Thyssen |

- Standings after the event

=== Medal table ===
* Host nation (United States)

| Rank | Nation | Gold | Silver | Bronze | Total |
|---|---|---|---|---|---|
| 1 | United States (USA)* | 2 | 1 | 0 | 3 |
| 2 | France (FRA) | 1 | 1 | 1 | 3 |
| 3 | Japan (JPN) | 1 | 0 | 0 | 1 |
| 4 | Australia (AUS) | 0 | 1 | 2 | 3 |
| 5 | Indonesia (INA) | 0 | 1 | 0 | 1 |
| 6 | Argentina (ARG) | 0 | 0 | 1 | 1 |
| Totals (6 entries) | | 4 | 4 | 4 | 12 |

== Olympic qualification ==
The event counted towards qualification for the 2024 Summer Olympics in Paris (surfing events to be held in Teahupo'o, Tahiti). The winning men's and women's national teams earned a qualification slot for their respective country. This was in addition to the maximum quota of two athletes per country. Japan won a qualification slot for the men's event, while the United States won a qualification slot for the women's event.

== Participating nations ==
The following countries sent delegations to the 2022 ISA World Surfing Games:

- Afghanistan
- Algeria
- American Samoa
- Argentina
- Australia
- Barbados
- Belgium
- Brazil
- Canada
- Chile
- China
- Chinese Taipei
- Colombia
- Costa Rica
- Denmark
- Dominican Republic
- Ecuador
- El Salvador
- Finland
- France
- Germany
- Great Britain
- Greece
- Indonesia
- Iran
- Ireland
- Israel
- Italy
- Jamaica
- Japan
- Lithuania
- Mexico
- Netherlands
- New Zealand
- Nicaragua
- Norway
- Panama
- Peru
- Poland
- Portugal
- Puerto Rico
- Saudi Arabia
- Senegal
- South Africa
- South Korea
- Spain
- Switzerland
- Turkey
- Ukraine
- United States
- Venezuela

== See also ==
- 2022 ISA World SUP and Paddleboard Championship
