= Saffi Vette =

New Zealand surfer (born 2001)

Personal information
- Born: 31 December 2001 (age 24) Gisborne, New Zealand

Surfing career
- Sport: Surfing

Surfing specifications
- Stance: regular

Saffi Vette (born 31 December 2001) is a New Zealand surfer who competed in the women's shortboard event at the 2024 Summer Olympics. She won the New Zealand Women's Open in 2021.

== Early life ==
Vette was born and raised in Makorori Beach, Gisborne, on the east coast of New Zealand. She got her first surfboard at the age of two or three, and was taught to surf and coached by her father. She began surfing competitively when she was aged 11.

== Career ==
Vette won the 2019 Australian girls’ Pro Junior Final at the Hydralyte Sports Surf Series in Victoria.

In 2021 Vette won the 2021 Emersons South Island Surfing Championships and the New Zealand Women's Open. She competed at Surf City El Salvador in 2021 but did not qualify for the Tokyo Olympics. In 2023 Vette won the Mad Mex Pro QS1000, which was held at Maroubra in New South Wales. She competed against Brazilian surfer Anne Dos Santos in the final.

Vette relocated to Australia's Gold Coast. In 2024 Vette competed in the World Surf League Challenger Series. At the 2024 Summer Olympics, held in Tahiti, she placed 17th of 24, coming 2nd in both the first and second heats.

In 2025 Vette was Gisborne Boardriders Club Surfer of the Year, and competed in the Taiwan QS6000, where she equalled her personal best and was runner-up to Lucy Darragh.

== Personal life ==
Vette's father and surfing mentor, Andrew Vette, died of cancer in 2020. Andrew Vette had been on the board of Surfing New Zealand. Vette is dyslexic. She attended Gisborne Girls' High School until Year 11, and then completed her education to partway through Year 13 by correspondence.
