= Shino Matsuda (surfer) =

Japanese surfer

Shino Matsuda 松田 詩野
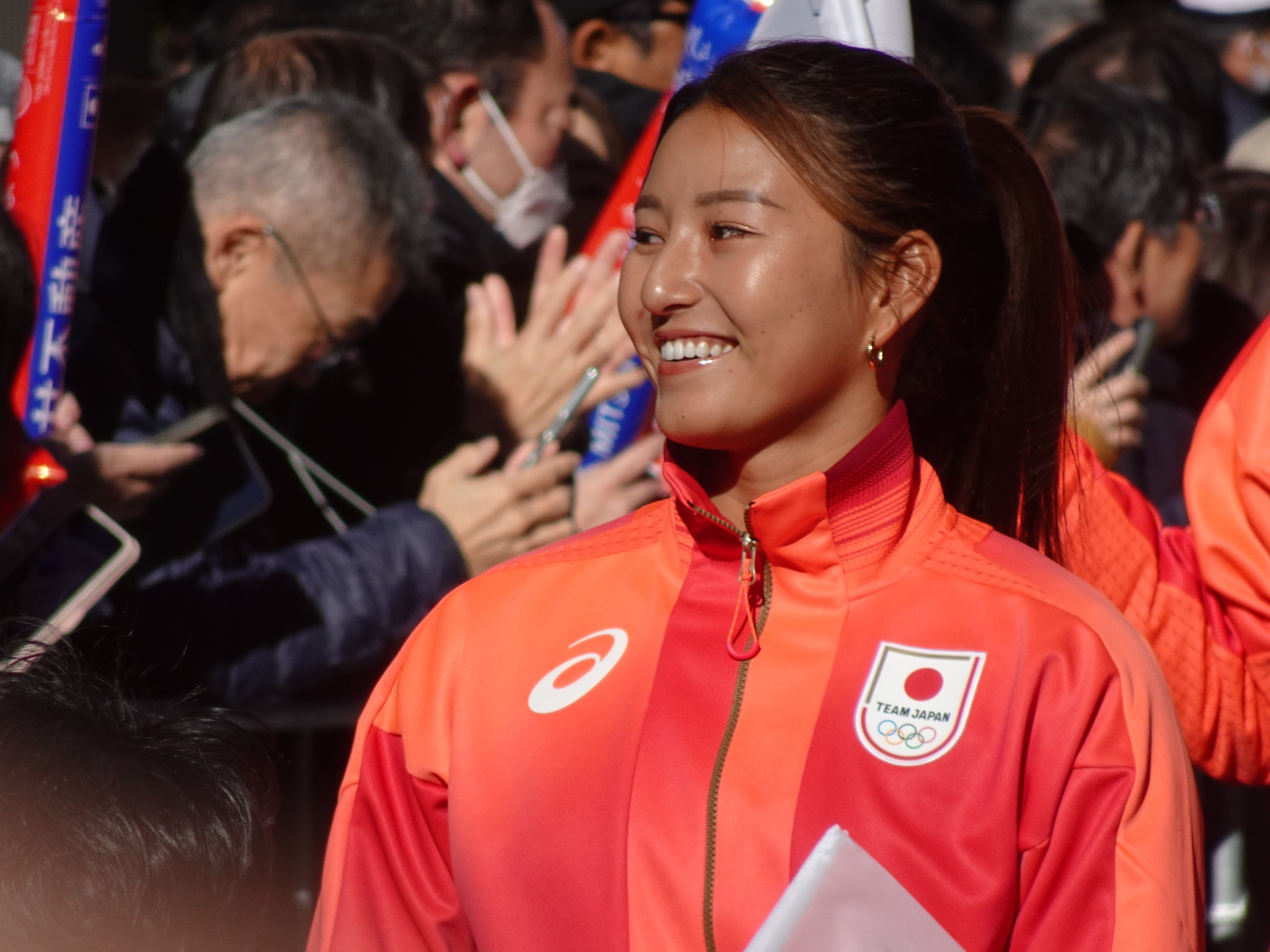
- Shino Matsuda at Paris 2024 Summer Olympians and Paralympians Japan National Team parade event on November 30th, 2024

Personal information
- Native name: 松田 詩野
- Nationality: Japanese
- Born: 13 August 2002 (age 24) Kanagawa Prefecture, Japan

Sport
- Country: Japan
- Sport: Surfing

Shino Matsuda (松田 詩野, Matsuda Shino; born 13 August 2002) is a Japanese surfer. She competed in the 2024 Summer Olympics in the Women's shortboard event reaching round 3.
