= Ramzi Boukhiam =

Moroccan surfer (born 1993)

Personal information
- Born: 14 September 1993 (age 32) Agadir, Morocco
- Height: 1.84 m (6 ft 0 in)
- Weight: 85 kg (187 lb)

Surfing career
- Sport: Surfing
- Best year: 2024 – Ranked #12 WSL CT World Tour

Surfing specifications
- Stance: Goofy
Medal record
Surfing
Representing Morocco
World Surfing Games
Silver medal – second place	2024 Arecibo	Men
World Junior Championships
Silver medal – second place	2013 Florianópolis	Shortboard
Bronze medal – third place	2012 Bali	Shortboard

Ramzi Boukhiam (born 14 September 1993) is a Moroccan surfer. He placed 6th overall at the 2019 ISA World Surfing Games, earning qualification for the 2020 Summer Olympics as the highest-placed African surfer. He competed in the men's shortboard event at the 2020 Olympics, where he was eliminated in the third round by Michel Bourez of France. He qualified for the 2024 Olympic Games.

== Biography ==
Boukhiam was born in Morocco to a Moroccan father and a Dutch mother. He was encouraged to begin surfing at age eight by his brother Samir. His father died when he was eleven, and, two years later, his family moved to France.

In his junior career, Boukhiam was twice a medalist at the World Junior Championships, including finishing as runner-up to Gabriel Medina in 2013.

== Career ==
Boukhiam debuted in the World Surf League at the 2011 Quiksilver Pro France, where he came in thirteenth after being defeated by Kelly Slater.

In 2022, he became the first Moroccan to qualify for the World Surf League's (WSL) Championship Tour (CT). He was unable to compete after breaking his ankle, and was replaced by Costa Rican surfer Carlos Muñoz.

In February 2023, Boukhiam underwent ankle surgery.

Boukhiam replaced Filipe Toledo, who withdrew from the WSL 2024 CT season to focus on his mental health in February 2024.

On 3 March 2024, Boukhiam won a silver medal at the 2024 ISA World Surfing Games, thus becoming the first Moroccan to ever win a medal in the World Surfing Games.

Boukhiam placed third in the SHISEIDO Tahiti Pro, defeating Kelly Slater in the quarterfinals.

=== Victories ===
WQS Wins
Year	Event	Venue	Country
2022	Seat Pro Netanya	Kontiki Beach, Netanya	Israel
2020	Oi Hang Loose Pro Contest	Fernando de Noronha, Pernambuco	Brazil
2018	Caraïbos Lacanau Pro	Lacanau Océan, Gironde	France
2017	Pro Anglet	Chambre d'Amour, Anglet	France
2012	San Miguel Pro Zarautz	Zarautz, Basque Country	Spain
Juniors Wins
Year	Event	Venue	Country
2012	WAHRLD Pro Junior Junior	Coruña, Galicia	Spain
2012	Sooruz Royan Atlantique Pro Junior	Royan, Charente-Maritime	France

Olympic Games
Preceded by Samir Azzimani	Flag bearer for Morocco; Tokyo 2020 with Oumaïma Belahbib	Succeeded by Yassine Aouich
