= Sarah Baum =

Sarah Baum (born 26 January 1994) is a South African professional surfer. She competed at the 2024 Summer Olympics, placing joint-ninth.

== Career ==
Baum grew up in Amanzimtoti, KwaZulu-Natal, on the coast south of Durban, South Africa. She began surfing as a child as her father was an enthusiastic surfer and put her in the waves at high tide from the age of three. After living in Australia and the UK for periods due to her father's job, the family returned to Durban when Baum was seven, and her father entered her in a surfing competition aged eight. The performance at this competition earned her a sponsorship and led to her travelling South Africa to compete regularly. She took up international competition as a teenager, and continued surfing in Australia, hoping to qualify for the professional World Surf League (WSL) tour; she narrowly missed out on qualifying aged 17 and again the next two years.

Around this time, Baum came out, causing her to lose sponsorships. She says this betrayal while she was at her peak made her become angry at the surfing world. She decided to take a hiatus from professional surfing so she could "remind myself why I fell in love with the sport in the first place". After returning to competition, she secured a spot on the WSL Challenger tour in 2023, and competed for a place at the 2024 Olympics at the ISA World Games. During this event, she broke her foot; with only one surf left to complete, she stayed and qualified. Baum is recognised for her skill in surfing the break.

== Personal life ==
Baum moved permanently to Newcastle, New South Wales in 2017;
