= 2024 ISA World Surfing Games =

Surfing event in Puerto Rico

- Venue: La Marginal
- Location: Arecibo, Puerto Rico
- Date: 23 February – 3 March 2024

The 2024 ISA World Surfing Games took place at La Marginal in Arecibo, Puerto Rico, from 23 February to 3 March 2024. The event was organised by the International Surfing Association (ISA).

Brazil's Gabriel Medina won his first senior title in the men's event, while Australia's Sally Fitzgibbons won her fourth senior title in the women's event.

== Medal summary ==
=== Medallists ===
Event	Gold	Silver	Bronze
Men	Gabriel Medina; Brazil	Ramzi Boukhiam; Morocco	Kauli Vaast; France
Women	Sally Fitzgibbons; Australia	Tatiana Weston-Webb; Brazil	Johanne Defay; France
Team Points	Brazil; Yago Dora; Gabriel Medina; Filipe Toledo; Tainá Hinckel; Luana Silva; Tatiana Weston-Webb	France; Joan Duru; Marco Mignot; Kauli Vaast; Johanne Defay; Vahiné Fierro; Tessa Thyssen	Australia; Morgan Cibilic; Ethan Ewing; Jack Robinson; Sally Fitzgibbons; Molly Picklum; Tyler Wright

- Standings after the event

=== Medal table ===
* Host nation (Puerto Rico)

Rank	Nation	Gold	Silver	Bronze	Total
1	Brazil (BRA)	2	1	0	3
2	Australia (AUS)	1	0	1	2
3	France (FRA)	0	1	2	3
4	Morocco (MAR)	0	1	0	1
Totals (4 entries)		3	3	3	9

== Olympic qualification ==
The event contributed towards qualification for the 2024 Olympics surfing competition in Teahupo'o, where surfing makes its second appearance as an Olympic sport. The top five men and top seven women eligible for qualification were each awarded a quota place. The winning teams by gender also secured one place for their respective NOC, regardless of the two-per-country quota limit.

== See also ==
- 2024 World Surf League
