= Kanoa Igarashi =

Japanese-American surfer (born 1997)

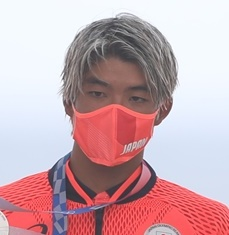
- Igarashi in 2021

Personal information
- Born: October 1, 1997 (age 29) Huntington Beach, California, U.S.
- Years active: Since 2012 (14)
- Height: 5 ft 11 in (180 cm)
- Weight: 171 lb (78 kg)

Surfing career
- Sport: Surfing
- Best year: 2022 - Ranked #5 WSL CT World Tour
- Sponsors: Red Bull, Quiksilver, Oakley, Beats by Dr. Dre, Shiseido, G-Shock
- Major achievements: WSL Championship Tour event wins: 1; 2020 Olympics silver Medal; 2021 Challenger Series champion; 2018 World Qualifying Series Champion; 2022 ISA World Surfing Games Champion; 2x US Open of Surfing champion (2017, 2018); Surfers' Hall of Fame inductee

Surfing specifications
- Stance: Regular (natural foot)

Olympic medal record

Men's surfing

Representing Japan

Olympic Games
Silver medal – second place	2020 Tokyo	Shortboard

World Games
Gold medal – first place	2022 Huntington Beach	Men
Silver medal – second place	2018 Tahara	Men
Silver medal – second place	2021 La Bocana	Men
Silver medal – second place	2021 La Bocana	Team
Bronze medal – third place	2019 Miyazaki	Team

Asian Games
Gold medal – first place	2026 Aichi–Nagoya	Shortboard

Kanoa Igarashi

Japanese name
- Kanji: 五十嵐カノア
Transcriptions
- Romanization: Igarashi Kanoa

Kanoa Igarashi (Japanese: 五十嵐 カノア, Hepburn: Igarashi Kanoa; born October 1, 1997) is a Japanese-American surfer who has competed professionally worldwide since 2012.

== Early life ==
Igarashi's father Tsutomu was a surfer in Japan and a fan of the sport. When his wife Misa found out she was pregnant, the couple quit their jobs in Tokyo and moved to Huntington Beach, California, aka Surf City, with the goal of raising their child to be a competitive surfer. Tsutomu took his son surfing as young as age 3, and would routinely wake him up to go surfing by 5:45AM so he could still make it to school on time. Igarashi won his first surfing trophy by age 7.

== Career ==
In 2016 he entered as the youngest rookie to the WSL CT and the first representative surfer for Japan in the WSL. He won the Vans U.S. Open WSL event in his hometown of Huntington Beach two years in a row in 2017 and 2018, but was eliminated early the following year. Igarashi's first 1st-place finish at a WSL CT event was at the Corona Bali Protected event in Indonesia in 2019; he placed 6th overall that year.

As a top ranked finisher of the 2019 WSL CT, Igarashi qualified to compete in the 2020 Summer Olympic Games in Tokyo as a representative of Japan. The games were postponed to July 23, 2021, due to the 2019 coronavirus outbreak. The selected beach break for the competition was at Tsurigasaki beach in the town of Ichinomiya, Chiba prefecture. The chosen beach had special meaning to Igarashi as it was the same beach that his father Tsutomu not only surfed at, but also reportedly discovered with his friends and called "the Dojo". Igarashi won the silver medal in the competition. In 2016, he was the youngest rookie on the World Surf League (WSL) Championship Tour (CT), and had collected more Round One wins than any other surfer, finished 2nd place at the Pipeline event, and 20th place overall that year. His greatest career performance was in the 2022 WSL CT where he finished top 5 and got to compete on the final event of the year held in Trestles California. He qualified for the 2024 Olympic Games.

Igarashi is a Red Bull Athlete.

== Career victories ==
WCT Wins
Year	Event	Venue	Country
2019	Corona Bali Protected	Keramas, Bali	Indonesia
WQS Wins
Year	Event	Venue	Country
2018	Vans US Open of Surfing - Men's QS	Huntington Beach, California	United States
2018	Pro Santa Cruz 2018 pres. by Oakley	Praia da Fisica, Santa Cruz	Portugal
2017	Vans US Open of Surfing - Men's QS	Huntington Beach, California	United States
2017	Shoe City Pro	Huntington Beach, California	United States
2016	Hang Loose Pro Contest 30 Anos	Florianópolis, Santa Catarina	Brazil
2016	Pantin Classic Galicia Pro	Valdoviño, Galicia	Spain
2015	Mahalo Surf Eco Festival	Itacaré, Bahia	Brazil
2015	Vans Pro	Virginia Beach, Virginia	United States
2014	Shoe City Pro	Huntington Beach, California	United States
Juniors Wins
Year	Event	Venue	Country
2015	Los Cabos Open of Surf	Zippers, San Jose del Cabo	Mexico
2015	Hurley Australian Open	Manly Beach, New South Wales	Australia

WSL World Championship Tour
Tournament	2016	2017	2018	2019
Quiksilver Pro Gold Coast	9th	25th	9th	9th
Rip Curl Pro Bells Beach	13th	25th	25th	9th
Corona Bali Protected	-	-	25th	1st
Margaret River Pro	13th	13th	25th	9th
Oi Rio Pro	13th	9th	9th	5th
Corona Open J-Bay	13th	25th	3rd	5th
Billabong Pro Tahiti Teahupoo	13th	13th	9th	17th
Freshwater Pro	-	-	3rd	9th
Quiksilver Pro France	13th	25th	25th	17th
MEO Rip Curl Pro Portugal	13th	3rd	5th	3rd
Billabong Pipeline Masters	2nd	3rd	13th	17th
Fiji Pro	13th	25th	-	-
Hurley Pro at Trestles	13th	5th	-	-
OVERALL RANK	20th	17th	10th	6th
Earnings	$157,250	$153,250	$174,600	$253,900
