= New Smyrna Beach High School =

Public high school in New Smyrna Beach, Florida, United States

Coordinates: 29.003615°N 80.930298°W

Location
- 1015 10th Street; New Smyrna Beach, Florida; United States

Information
- Type: Public high school
- Motto: "Working together with parents, school personnel, and community members, New Smyrna Beach High School students will graduate with the knowledge, skills, and values necessary to be positive contributors to society."
- Established: 1963
- School district: Volusia County School District
- Principal: Timothy Merrick
- Staff: 82.02 (FTE)
- Enrollment: 1,738 (2023-2024)
- Student to teacher ratio: 21.19
- Colors: Red and black
- Mascot: Barracudas
- Website: www.nsbhigh.com

New Smyrna Beach High School (NSBHS) is a public high school located in New Smyrna Beach, Florida, United States.

== About ==
The school mascot is the Barracuda, commonly referred to as the "Cuda."

The high school opened in 1963 on what is now called Barracuda Boulevard. In the fall of 2006 NSBHS opened their new location, approximately 3 miles from the old school, at 1015 10th Street, just down the road from New Smyrna Beach Middle School.

The school has been named a Blue Ribbon School of Excellence.

The annual yearbook is known as The Smyrnan.

== Academics ==
Currently ranked as an "A" school by the state of Florida, NSBHS offers AP (Advanced Placement), AICE Cambridge, and Honors classes, as well as the AVID program. The school offers specialized academies in numerous areas:

- Culinary Academy
- Engineering and Design Academy
- Medical Academy
- Early Education Academy
- Criminal Justice Academy

== Activities ==
The school offers various activities, such as academic team, the Barracuda Band, drama, International Thespian Society troupe 1903, art, spirit club, class steering committees, photography, Key Club, Razzle Dazzle fashion club, FFA, HOSA, SGA, Spanish club, French club, Cuda Care, Beta Club, National Honor Society, Cuda Marketing, Campus Impact, chess club, Model UN, Interact, and the Ahistorical Reenactment Society of Edgewater.

New Smyrna Beach High School is home to the award-winning varsity dance team, the Showdolls. They have won 11 national dance team championships:

- 1990 Prop - "Joker's Wild"
- 1993 Prop - "Hairspray"
- 1994 Prop - "Orient Express"
- 1995 Prop - "True Colors"
- 1996 Prop - "On Safari"
- 1998 Prop - "Vogue"
- 1999 High Kick - "Prisoner"
- 2000 High Kick - "Electricity"
- 2004 Prop - "A Pirate's Life"
- 2005 Prop - "Live From Mars"
- 2010 High Kick - "Cirque"
- 2011 High Kick - "Nerds"

== Notable alumni ==
Sports

- Dallas Baker, CFL professional football player (2001)
- Ed Bennett, NASCAR Chief Administrative Officer, IMSA Chief Executive Officer
- Wes Chandler, Hall of Fame professional football player (1974)
- D'Cota Dixon, NFL safety for the Tampa Bay Buccaneers
- Darrell Fullington, former professional football player (1983)
- Eric Geiselman, professional surfer
- Evan Geiselman, professional surfer
- Cole Holcomb, NFL player
- Chris Isaac, former CFL quarterback with the Ottawa Rough Riders (1977)
- Raheem Mostert, NFL running back and kickoff returner for multiple teams (2011)
- Darrynton Evans, NFL running back for the Tennessee Titans
- Dylan DeLucia, 2022 College World Series MVP

Entertainment

- The Beu Sisters, music recording artists
- Alex Kinsey, Season 3 winner of The X Factor

Entrepreneurship

- Adam Lovell, owner of WriteAPrisoner.com
