= National Scholastic Surfing Association =

American surfing association

The National Scholastic Surfing Association (NSSA) is a surfing association in the United States. It is a member organization of Surfing America, the National Governing Body of Surfing in the United States. Founded in 1978 by Tom Gibbons, John Rothrock, Chuck Allen, Laird Hayes, Holly Allen, and Rob Hill.

Many well-known surfers have competed in the NSSA before turning professional. These include Kelly Slater, Andy Irons, Carissa Moore, Kalani Robb, Cheyne Magnusson, Bethany Hamilton and Bobby Martinez. Carissa Moore currently holds the most NSSA Nationals titles with 11 overall while Kolohe Andino holds the most titles won by a male competitor (9).

== National Championship Titles ==
National Scholastic Surfing Association (1978 - 2019)

=== National Open Champions ===
Year	Men	Women	Juniors	Boys	Minigroms	Longboard	Girls
2024	Dane Libby	Eden Walla	Makai Castle	Finn Castle	Shuto Iida	Kydon Larrabee	Bailey Turner
2023	Lucas Senkbeil	Sara Freyre	Eeli Timperi	Makai Castle	Finn Castle	Alana Johnson	Zoie Zietz
2022	David O'Keefe	Sara Freyre	Luke Tema	Lucas Senkbeil	Tanner Sandvig	Gavin Idone	Bella Kenworthy
2019	Taj Lindblad	Luana Silva	Robert Grilho III	Jak Ziets	Quaid Fahrion	Mack Landry	Vahiti Inso
2018	Robert Grilho III	Gabriela Bryan	Kade Matson	Hayden Rodgers	Tiger Abubo	Mack Landry	Luana Silva
2017	Barron Mamiya	Summer Macedo	Wyatt McHale	Ryan Huckabee	Rylan Beavers	Ian Appling	Caroline Marks
2016	Jake Marshall	Brisa Hennessy	Cole Houshmand	Levi Slawson	Tenshi Iwami	Spenser Bridges	Caroline Marks
2015	Seth Moniz	Caroline Marks	Eithan Osborne	Brodi Sale	Makuna Franzmann	Parker Sawyer	Caroline Marks
2014	Josh Moniz	Caroline Marks	Griffin Colapinto	Wyatt McHale	Jett Schilling	Nick Anderberg	Brisa Hennessy
2013	Taylor Clark	Dax McGill	Seth Moniz	Finn McGill	Tommy Coleman	Fisher Grant	Moana Jones
2012	Ezekiel Lau	Dax McGill	Kalani David	Finn McGill	Nick Marshall	Steve McLean	Frankie Harrer
2011	Cam Richards	Leila Hurst	Parker Coffin	Jake Marshall	Tyler Gunter	Steve McLean	Dax McGill
2010	Kaimana Jaquias	Lakey Peterson	Keala Nalhe	Kanoa Igarashi	John Mel	Shaun Thompson	
2009	Kolohe Andino	Lakey Peterson	Ezekiel Lau	Ian Gentil	Kei Kobayashi	Scott Brandenburg	
2008	Nat Young	Courtney Conlogue	Andrew Doheny	Koa Smith	Kalani David	Cole Robbins	
2007	Tonino Benson	Carissa Moore	Andrew Doheny	Keala Naihe	Benji Brand	Troy Mothershead	
2006	Kekoa Cazimero	Carissa Moore	Dillon Perillo	Conner Coffin	Koa Smith	Christian Wach	
2005	Clay Marzo	Carissa Moore	Kai Barger	John John Florence	Kolohe Andino	Christian Clark	
2004	Dane Gudauskas	Carissa Moore	Clay Marzo	John John Florence	Evan Geiselman	Tony Silvagni	
2003	Patrick Gudauskas	Erica Hosseini	Kilian Garland	Granger Larsen	John John Florence		
2002	Dustin Cuizon	Karina Petroni	Jeremy Johnston	Kai Barger	Dane Zaun		
2001	Greg Long	Holly Beck	Patrick Gudauskas	Lance Gruver	Granger Larsen		
2000	Anthony Petruso	Kristin Quizon	Travis Mellem	Kilian Garland	Thomas Clarke		
1999	Fredrick Patacchia Jr.	Sena Seramur	Dustin Cuizon	TJ Barron	Adam Wickwire		
1998	Michael Losness	Sena Seramur	Bobby Martinez	Dustin Cuizon	Kilian Garland		
1997	Bruce Irons	Jessica Earl	Michael Losness	Kekoa Bacalso	Hank Gaskell		
1996	Andy Irons	Melanie Bartels	Shaun Burrell	Sean Moody	Michael Taras		
1995	Eric McHenry	Megan Abubo	C.J. Hobgood	Bobby Martinez			
1994	Kalani Robb	Megan Abubo	Chris Ward	Nainoa Suratt			
1993	Kalani Robb	Jayme Lee	Kalani Robb	Eric Diaz			
1992	Bryan Doonan	Falina Spires	Kalani Robb	Josh Wilson			
1991	Barry Deffenbaugh	Hoey Capps	Jeremy Sommerville	Chris Ward			
1990	Mark Austin	Nea Post	Shea Lopez	Cory Lopez			
1989	Joey Zintel	Nea Post	Rob Machado	Craig Etchegoyen			
1988	Taylor Knox	Rochell Gordines	Donavan Frankenreiter	Mike Hoisington			
1987	Todd Miller	Janel Anello	Kaipo Jaquias	Mike Hoisington			
1986	Jim Pinkerton	Christine Gillard	Kirk Tice	Shane Stoneman			
1985	Dino Andino	Christine Gillard	Jeff Booth	Kelly Slater			
1984	Scott Farnsworth	Jolene Smith	Jeff Booth	Strider Wasilewski			
1983	Chris Frohoff	Debbie Rooney	Noah Budroe				
1982	Kelly Gibson	Christel Roever	Brad Gerlach				
1981	Chris Frohoff	Debbie Rooney	Chris Frohoff				
1980	Doug McKenzie	Kim Mearig					
1980	Todd Martin	Debbie Rooney					
1979	Bud Llamas	Alisa Schwarzstein					
1979	Jeff Johnson	Kathy Wilson					
1978	Mark McDandel	Alisa Schwarzstein					
1978	Bud Llamas	Francine Hill					

=== National Explorer Champions ===
Year	Men	Women	Juniors	Boys	Menehuene	Supergroms	Longboard	Girls
2024	Braeden Kopec	Isla Hardy	Braeden Kopec	Kahlil Schooley	Finn Castle	Brett Gregorious	Kydon Larrabee	Teagan Meza
2023	Luke Tema	Haylee Boverman	Oliver Zietz	Kahlil Schooley	Finn Castle	Keali’i Lambeth	Kaimana Domen	Maddie Stanton
2022	Blayr Barton	Pua DeSoto	Oliver Zietz	Dylan Sloan	Kai Nelson	Finn Castle	Chase Lieder	Avery McDonald
2019	Robert Grilho III	Pua Desoto	Dimitri Poulos	Lucas Owston	Jak Ziets	Tiger Abubo	Nicholas Lee	Zoe Benedetto
2018	David Economos	Gabriela Bryan	Sage Tutterow	Robert Grilho III	Hayden Rodgers	Legend Chandler	Abigail Remke	Savanna Stone
2017	Nick Marshall	Caroline Marks	Cole Alves	Brodi Sale	Ryan Huckabee	Jak Zietz	Trip Chandler	Caroline Marks
2016	Gabriel Morvil	Gabriela Bryan	Cody Young	Tommy Coleman	Jackson Bunch	Kai Martin	Trip Chandler	Alyssa Spencer
2015	Elijah Gates	Moana Jones	Seth Moniz	Bo Raynor	Dimitri Poulos	Levi Young	Parker Sawyer	Caroline Marks
2014	Cobie Gittner	Brisa Hennessy	Jake Marshall	Stevie Pittman	Dagan Stagg	Jackson Bunch	Nick Anderberg	Brisa Hennessy
2013	Kalani David	Moana Jones	Jake Marshall	Griffin Colapinto	Barron Mamiya	Tommy Coleman	Fisher Grant	Moana Jones
2012	Ezekiel Lau	Tatiana Weston-Webb	Kaito Kino	Takumi Yasui	John Mell	Noah Hill	Steve McLean	Dax McGill
2011	Chris Tucker	Leila Hurst	Matty Costa	Kalani David	Jake Marshall	Finn McGill	Shaun Thompson	Tatiana Weston-Webb
2010	Ezekiel Lau	Leila Hurst	Parker Coffin	Taylor Clark	Kalani David		Dane Peterson	Mahina Maeda
2009	Kiron Jabour	Malia Manuel	Kiron Jabour	Kolohe Andino	Ian Gentil		Mike Gillard	Alessa Quizon
2008	Granger Larsen	Leila Hurst	Granger Larsen	Keanu Asing	Koa Smith		Cole Robbins	Leila Hurst
2007	Cory Arrambide	Carissa Moore	Kai Barger	Evan Geiselman	Kolohe Andino		Troy Mothershead	Alessa Quizon
2006	Dusty Payne	Paige Alms	Granger Larsen	Kolohe Andino	Kolohe Andino		Troy Mothershead	Carissa Moore
2005	Dusty Payne	Bethany Hamilton	Casey Brown	Granger Larsen	John John Florence		Justin Quintal	
2004	Jeremy Johnston	Carissa Moore	Dylan Graves	Clay Marzo	Kiron Jabour		Felipe Becerra	
2003	Andrew Gahan	Anastasia Ashley	Dustin Cuizon	Tanner Gudauskas	Tyler Newton		Felipe Becerra	
2002	Nathaniel Curran	Leilani Gryde	Dustin Cuizon	Kilian Garland	Tonino Benson		Taylor Jensen	
2001	Robbie Schofield	Sena Seramur	Joel Centeio	TJ Barron	Kai Barger		Keegan Edwards	
2000	Matt Keenan	Melanie Bartles	Sean Moody	Nathan Carroll	Adam Wickwire		Taylor Jensen	
1999	Jeremy Ryan	Sena Seramur	Frederick Patacchia Jr.	Dustin Cuizon	Hank Gaskell		Kahekili Kaaa	
1998	Maikai Makena	Sena Seramur	Bobby Martinez	Sean Moody	Tommy O'Brien		Jason Acuna	
1997	Adam Virs	Melanie Bartles	Damien Hobgood	Bobby Martinez	Nathaniel Curran		Ian Pancer	
1996	Iain McPhillips	Melanie Bartles	Andy Irons	Micah Byrne	Joel Centeio		Brendan White	
1995	Morgan Wright	Megan Abubo	Andy Irons	Bobby Martinez	Bobby Martinez		Brendan White	
1994	Brett Strother	Megan Abubo	Cory Lopez	Damien Hobgood	Bobby Martinez		Ryan Rocca	
1993	Christian Enns	Connie Clark	Shawn Sutton	Jason Bennett	Eric Diaz		Colin McPhilips	
1992	Ryan Simmons	Maili Rohner	Randy Nolan	Mike Reilly	Mikala Jones		Colin McPhilips	
1991	Justin Burns	Felina Spires	Julian Sekon	David Dixon	C.J. Hobgood		Jamey Liddell	
1990	Joshua Ryan	Nea Post	Banning Capps	Omar Etcheverry			John Sales	
1989	Evan Slater	Rochelle Ballard	Joshua Ryan	Jeremy Sommerville			Ed Enriquez	
1988	Steve Pugh	Robyn Kropp	Donavan Frankenreiter	Craig Etchegoyen			Ed Enriquez	
1987	Bobby Lockhart	Nea Post	Evan Slater	Matt Keenan				
1986	Jim Pinkerton	Janice Aragon	Arrow Young	Shane Stoneman				
1985	Dino Andino	Diana Hemsley	Colby Outlaw					
1984	Mike Schillmoeller	Amber Scott	Lloyd Tice					
1983	Jack Basely	Janel Anello	David Giddings					
1982	Mark Reeder							

=== College Team Champions ===
Year	College Team Champion	Runner-up
2024	Point Loma Nazarene University	Westcliff University
2023	Point Loma Nazarene University	Saddleback College
2022	Saddleback College	Point Loma Nazarene University
2019	Cal State San Marcos	North Florida
2018	Point Loma Nazarene University	MiraCosta College
2017	Point Loma Nazarene University	North Florida & Cal Poly San Luis Obispo
2016	Point Loma Nazarene University	North Florida
2015	Point Loma Nazarene University	North Florida
2014	Saddleback College	San Diego State
2013	San Diego State	UC San Diego & MiraCosta College
2012	MiraCosta College	San Diego State University
2011	MiraCosta College	UC Santa Barbara
2010	UC Santa Barbara	Cal State San Marcos & Point Loma Nazarene University
2009	Cal State San Marcos	UNC Wilmington
2008	UC Santa Barbara	San Diego State
2007	San Diego State	MiraCosta College
2006	Saddleback College	UC San Diego
2005	UC Santa Barbara	Point Loma Nazarene University
2004	MiraCosta College	San Diego State
2003	UC San Diego	Long Beach State
2002	UC Santa Barbara	MiraCosta College
2001	Long Beach State	MiraCosta College
2000	MiraCosta College	UC Santa Barbara
1999	Point Loma Nazarene University	
1998	UC Santa Barbara	
1997	UC San Diego	Point Loma Nazarene University
1996	UC Santa Barbara	
1995	UC San Diego	
1994	UC Santa Barbara	
1993	UC San Diego	
1992	UC Santa Barbara	
1991	UC Santa Barbara	
1990	UC San Diego	
1989	Point Loma Nazarene University	
1988	UC Santa Barbara	
1987	San Diego State	
1986	UC Santa Barbara	
1985	UC Santa Barbara	
1984	UC Santa Barbara	
1983	UC San Diego	
1982	Orange Coast College	
1981	Orange Coast College	
1980 Summer	Orange Coast College	
1979 Summer	No team award	
1978 Summer	Orange Coast College	

=== College Individual ===
Year	College Men		College Women		College Longboard	
2024	Tanner Vodraska	CSUSM	Taylor Stacy	Saddleback	Aidan Sautner	UCLA
2023	Noah Kawaguchi	PNLU	Lilie Kulber	UCLA	Jonathan Wallhauser	UCF
2022	Blake Speir	North Florida	Makena Burke	UCSD	Chase Adelsohn	PNLU
2019	Andrew Niemann	PLNU	Cayla Moore	Pepperdine	Kevin Skvarna	Saddleback
2018	Jacob Szekely	MiraCosta	Cayla Moore	Pepperdine	Kevin Skvarna	Saddleback
2017	Corey Howell	UNF	Emily Ruppert	UNF		
2016	Corey Howell	UNF	Darsha Pigford	PLNU		
2015	Jordan Kudla	PLNU	Marissa Shaw	SDSU		
2014	Shaw Kobayashi	Saddleback	Emily Ruppert	UNF		
2013	Nick Rupp	UNCW	Kaleigh Gilchrist	USC		
2012	Dayton Silva	MiraCosta	Amy Nicholl	UCF		
2011	Brent Reilly	MiraCosta	Lipoa Kahaleuahi	UCSB		
2010	Mike Powell	UNCW	Lipoa Kahaleuahi	UCSB		
2009	Marty Weinstein	UCSD	Amy Nicholl	UCF		
2008	Nick Olsen	MiraCosta	Lauren Sweeney	UCSD		
2007	Jon Flick	San Diego State	Lauren Sweeney	UCSD		
2006	Roger Eales	PLNU	Lauren Sweeney	UCSD		
2005	Adam Instone	USD	Lauren Sweeney	MiraCosta		
2004	Dylan Slater	USD	Kristin Wilson	UCF		
2003	Sam Baugh	USD	Loryn Wilson	UCSD		
2002	Sam Baugh	USD	Liz Clark	UCSB		
1994			Aimee Mindes	UCSB		
