= Floridan Menorcan =

Extinct dialect of Catalan

Floridan
- St. Augustine, Mahonese
- menorquí
- Native to: United States
- Region: St. Augustine, Florida
- Ethnicity: Florida Minorcans
- Extinct: late 19th century
- Language family: Indo-European: Italic; Latino-Faliscan; Latin; Romance; Italo-Western; Western Romance; Gallo-Romance (Note: Catalan is also classified as an Iberian Romance language.); Occitano-Romance; Catalan; Eastern; Insular; Balearic; Menorcan; Floridan
- Early forms: Old Latin: Vulgar Latin; Proto-Romance; Old Occitan; Old Catalan
- Writing system: Catalan

Language codes
- ISO 639-3: –
- Glottolog: None

Florida Menorcan (also known as Mahonian or St. Augustine Menorcan) was the linguistic variety of the Menorcan dialect of Catalan spoken in the city of St. Augustine, Florida, in the United States, in the late 18th and throughout the 19th centuries, brought by a colony of people from Mahón.

In 1768, a large number of Menorcans, along with other Italians and Greeks workers, left for Florida to establish an agricultural colony, at a time when Menorca and Florida were still under British rule, maintaining their own culture ever since.

Economically, the project was a disaster, but the Menorcan immigrants did not abandon Florida, nor did they abandon their language, which survived up until the 19th century. Linguist Philip Rasico, who studied it, still found a good number of words and surviving elements. Catalan was the language of the homes, streets, and workshops of the city of St. Augustine.
