= Cole Holcomb =

American football player (born 1996)

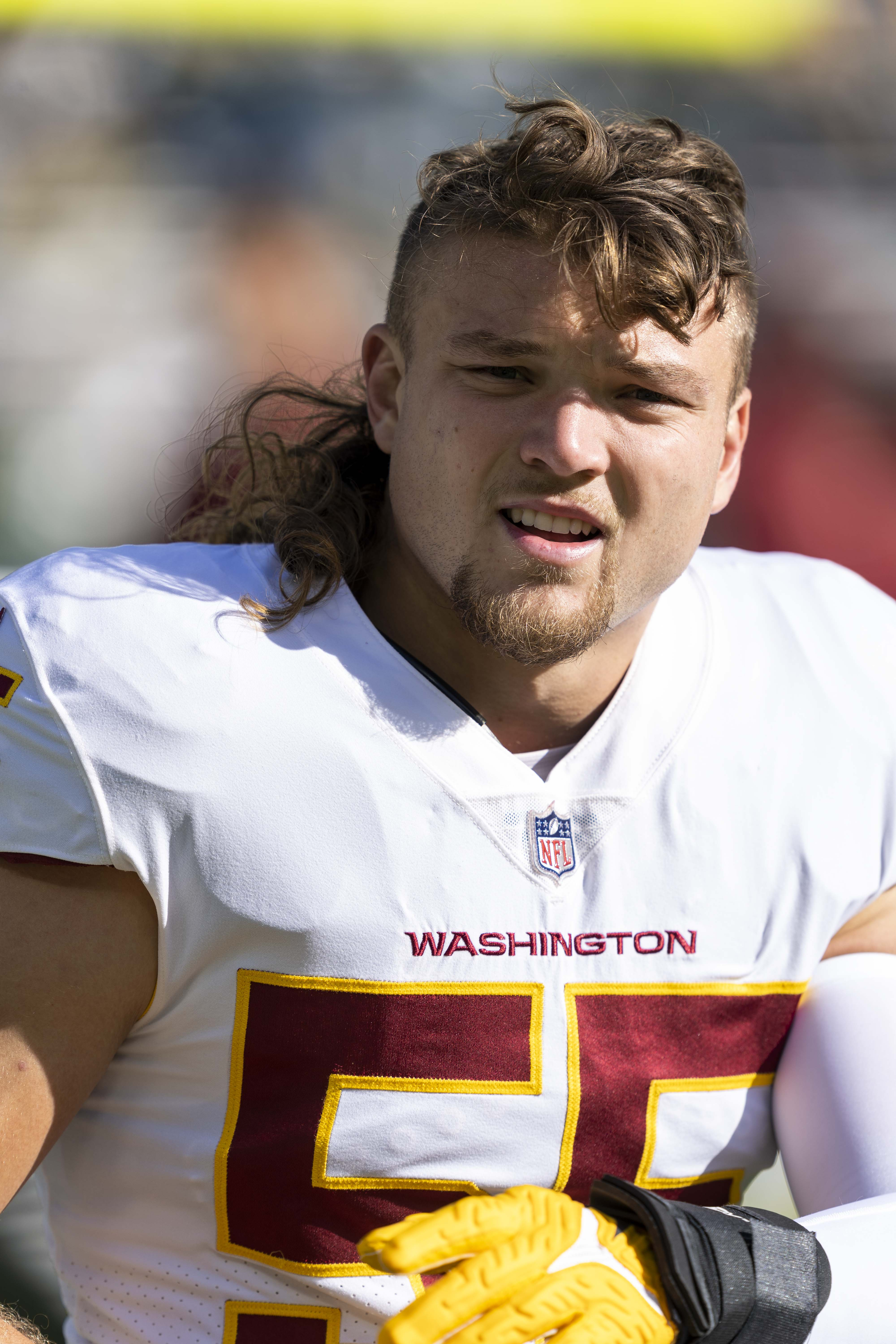
- Holcomb with the Washington Football Team in 2021

No. 55 – Pittsburgh Steelers
- Position: Linebacker
- Roster status: Active

Personal information
- Born: July 30, 1996 (age 30); New Smyrna Beach, Florida, U.S.
- Listed height: 6 ft 1 in (1.85 m)
- Listed weight: 240 lb (109 kg)

Career information
- High school: New Smyrna Beach
- College: North Carolina (2015–2018)
- NFL draft: 2019: 5th round, 173rd overall pick

Career history
- Washington Redskins / Football Team / Commanders (2019–2022); Pittsburgh Steelers (2023–present)

Awards and highlights
- Second-team All-ACC (2018)

Career NFL statistics as of Week 7, 2026
- Total tackles: 487
- Sacks: 4.5
- Forced fumbles: 7
- Fumble recoveries: 2
- Interceptions: 3
- Pass deflections: 12
- Defensive touchdowns: 1
- Stats at Pro Football Reference

Cole Holcomb (born July 30, 1996) is an American professional football linebacker for the Pittsburgh Steelers of the National Football League (NFL). He played college football for the North Carolina Tar Heels and was selected by the Washington Redskins in the fifth round of the 2019 NFL draft.

== College career ==
Holcomb walked on to the team as a freshman and appeared in all 14 games, mainly on special teams. His playing time grew as he continued to improve and eventually earned a scholarship, playing in 35 games over the next three seasons as he became the starting middle linebacker. In his senior season at Carolina, he appeared in all 11 games (the Tar Heels' game against UCF was canceled due to Hurricane Florence). He earned second-team All-Atlantic Coast Conference Honors for his play as a senior.

== Professional career ==
Pre-draft measurables
Height	Weight	Arm length	Hand span	Wingspan	40-yard dash	10-yard split	20-yard split	20-yard shuttle	Three-cone drill	Broad jump	Bench press
6 ft 1 1/4 in (1.86 m)	231 lb (105 kg)	31 5/8 in (0.80 m)	10 in (0.25 m)	6 ft 4 1/4 in (1.94 m)	4.51 s	1.59 s	2.60 s	4.14 s	6.77 s	11 ft 0 in (3.35 m)	22 reps
All values from North Carolina's Pro Day

=== Washington Redskins/Football Team/Commanders ===
==== 2019 ====
Holcomb was selected by the Washington Redskins in the fifth round (173rd overall) of the 2019 NFL draft. On May 9, 2019, the Washington Redskins signed Holcomb to a four-year, $2.75 million contract that includes a signing bonus of $234,884.

In Week 8 against the Minnesota Vikings, Holcomb forced a fumble on wide receiver Stefon Diggs that was recovered by teammate Ryan Anderson in the 19–9 loss. In week 12 against the Detroit Lions, Holcomb recorded a team high 13 tackles and sacked Jeff Driskel once in the 19–16 win.

==== 2020 ====
In Week 7 against the Dallas Cowboys, Holcomb recorded a sack on Andy Dalton and later intercepted a pass thrown by Dalton during the 25–3 win. In Week 16 against the Carolina Panthers, Holcomb led the team with 11 tackles and sacked Teddy Bridgewater once during the 20–13 loss.

==== 2021 ====
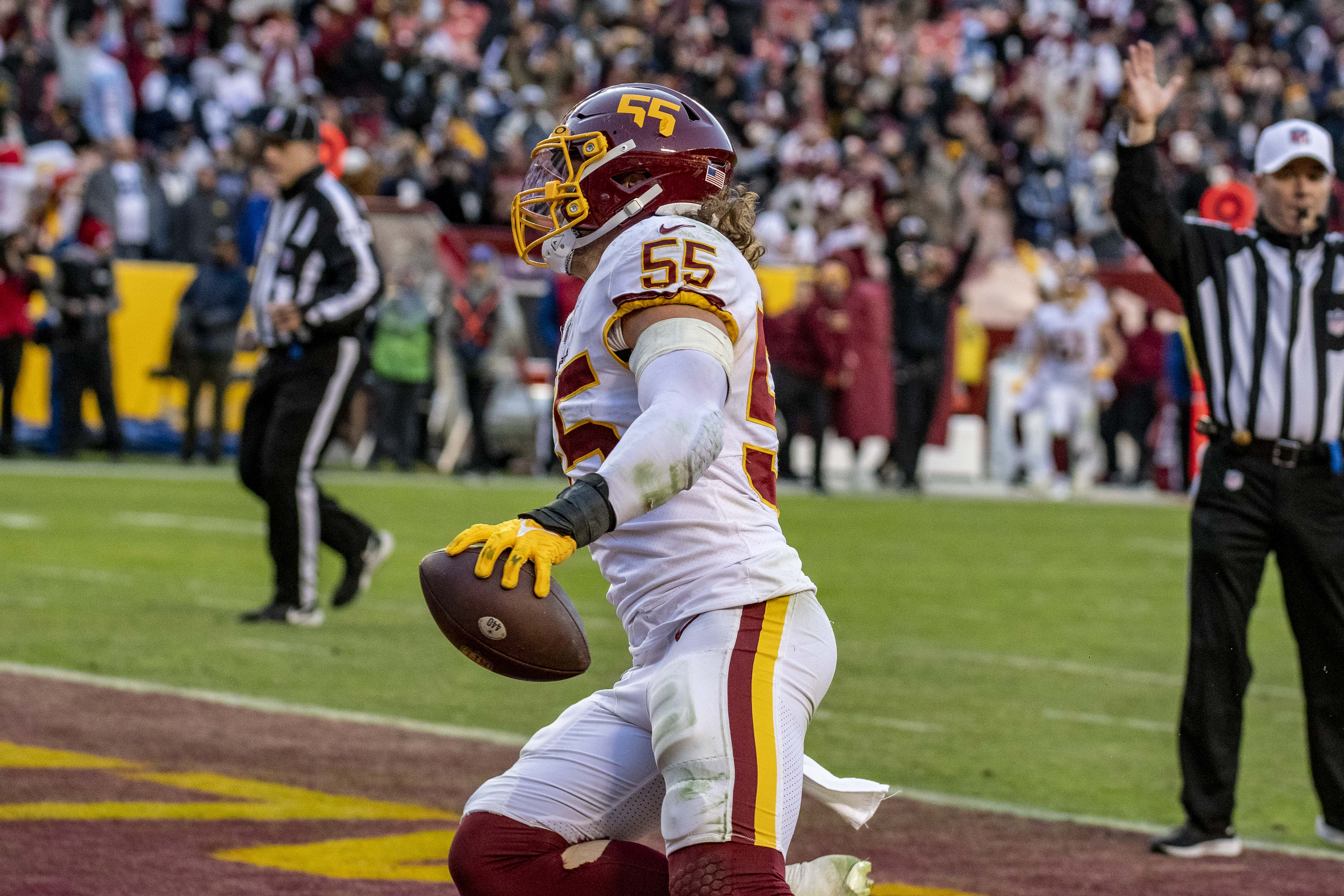
Holcomb returning an interception for a touchdown in 2021

Holcomb recorded an interception on Jameis Winston in Week 5 of the 2021 season against the New Orleans Saints. In Week 14, he recorded eight tackles and intercepted Dak Prescott and returned it 31 yards for his first career touchdown in a 27–20 loss to the Cowboys. He was placed on the COVID-19 reserve list on December 22, 2021, and forced to sit out of the Week 16 game against the Cowboys. On December 27, he was placed back on the active roster.

==== 2022 ====
Holcomb entered the 2022 season as the Commanders' starting middle linebacker. He missed four games with a knee injury before being placed on injured reserve on November 25, 2022. On December 5, Holcomb underwent foot surgery, ending his season. He finished the season with 60 tackles and one pass deflection over seven games.

=== Pittsburgh Steelers ===
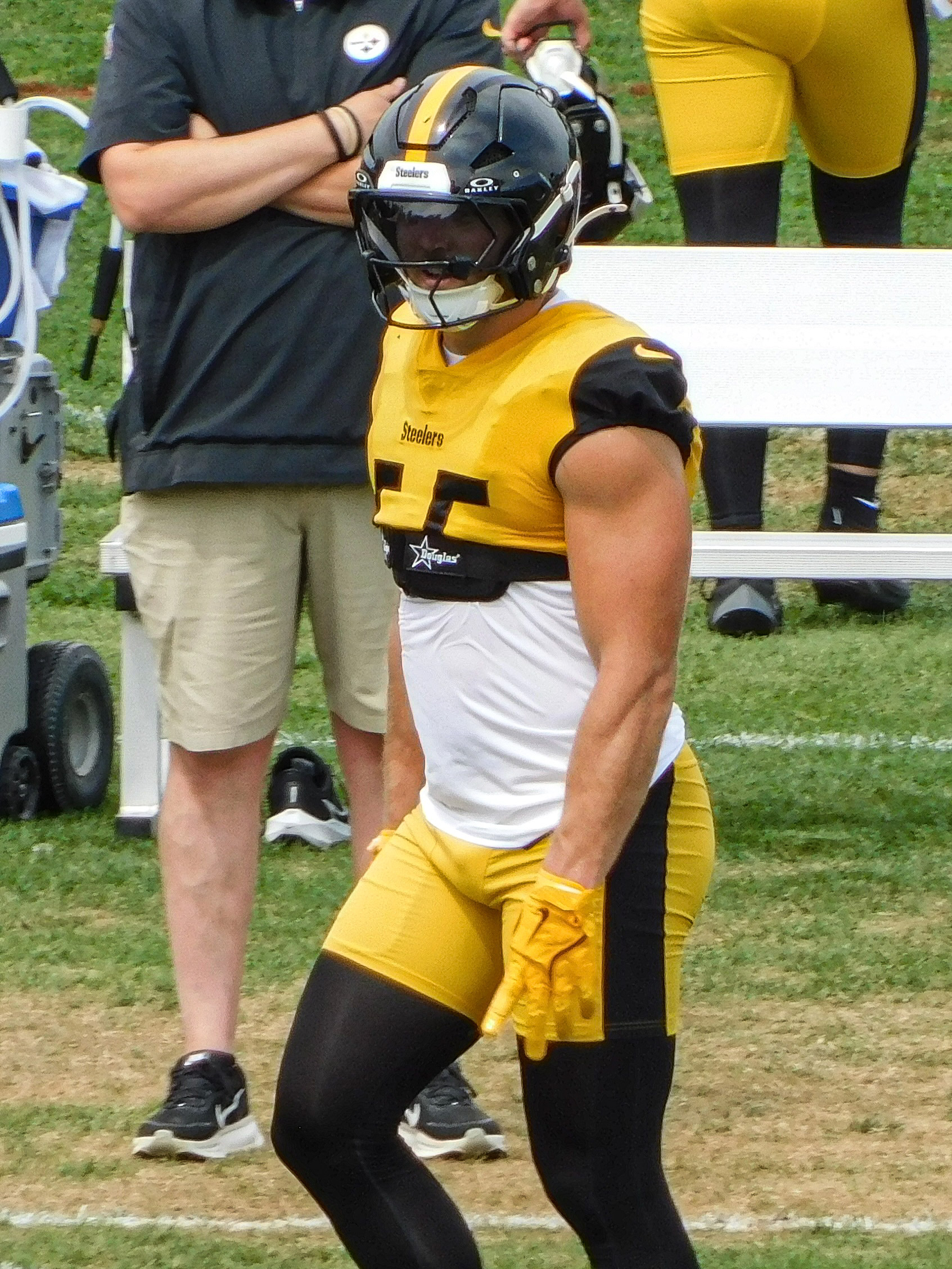
Holcomb with the Pittsburgh Steelers in 2025

On March 16, 2023, the Pittsburgh Steelers signed Holcomb to a three-year, $18 million contract that includes a signing bonus of $4.92 million. In Week 9, Holcomb's first season with the Steelers ended after a serious knee injury. He finished the season with 54 total tackles, four for a loss, two quarterback hits, two forced fumbles, and two passes defensed.

Holcomb began the 2024 season on the reserve/PUP list while recovering from the knee injury. He did not play a down the entirety of the 2024 season. Holcomb returned to the field in the Steelers’ 2025 preseason games and was a full participant during training camp.

On March 11, 2026, Holcomb signed a two-year, $5 million contract extension with the Steelers.

== Personal life ==
In June 2022, he married his wife, Casey Di Nardo, who played field hockey at North Carolina. Their daughter was born in June 2024.
