= Clay Marzo =

American professional surfer (born 1989)

Personal information
- Born: July 17, 1989 (age 36) San Diego, California, U.S.
- Years active: 2003–present
- Height: 6 ft 1 in (185 cm)
- Weight: 175 lb (79 kg)
- Website: claymarzo.com

Surfing career
- Sport: Surfing
- Sponsors: Skullcandy, DC Shoes, Rockstar, Futures Fins, Vestal, Super Brand Surfboards, Carve Sunglasses, Komunity Project

Surfing specifications
- Stance: Goofy
- Favorite maneuvers: Airs and barrels

Clay Marzo (born July 17, 1989) is an American professional surfer known for his unique "double-jointed" style of turns and spins. He was raised in Lahaina, Maui, Hawaii where he currently resides. Marzo has been acclaimed for his creativity and innovation as a young surfer, and featured in several films.

== Career ==
Clay Marzo began competitively surfing and swimming at an early age. When he was 10 years old, he won the 200-meter freestyle event at the annual Hawaii State Swimming Championships. At age 11, he placed third at the National Scholastic Surfing Association (NSSA) Nationals competition, and signed a pro contract with the Quiksilver team. When Marzo was 15, he became the first surfer to receive two perfect 10's in NSSA history and won the NSSA National title. In 2005, Marzo became the NSSA Open Men's National Champion. His other accomplishments include being nominated for Maneuver of the Year at the 2007 Surfer Poll Awards and Water Man of the Year in 2006.

Marzo has appeared with other notable surfers like Kelly Slater, Julian Wilson, and Dane Reynolds as a member of Quiksilver's Young Guns crew in the second and third films in the series. Other films include Stranger than Fiction and "Today Tomorrow", an episode of ESPN's E:60. In 2008, he was featured in a documentary film titled Clay Marzo: Just Add Water, directed by Jamie Tierney and Strider Wasilewski, which explores Marzo's surfing and his experience as a person with Asperger syndrome.

Marzo's sponsors include JSLV, Carve, Skullcandy, SPY Optic, Future, Creatures of Leisure, Vestal, Rockstar Energy, and Komunity Project.

== Personal life ==
Marzo was diagnosed with Asperger syndrome, a form of autism, in December 2007. Until then, his unconventional behavior at home and on the professional circuit was often misunderstood by those around him. Marzo did not connect well with peers at school or with fans or sponsors, he did not play by the expected rules at surf competitions, and he was known for being painfully honest. Marzo is intensely focused on his sport and has been described as both intuitive and expressive in the water. He is constantly seen rubbing his hands together at a rapid pace. Marzo volunteers with Surfers Healing, a non-profit organization from Malibu, California, which exposes autistic children to surfing at camps in the United States and Canada.

From 2008 to 2015, Marzo's bookkeeper, Felicidad Rivera, stole nearly $400,000 from Marzo and his mother. As a result, Marzo ended up losing his home and life savings. Marzo and his mother had difficulty overseeing Rivera due to the fact that Marzo has Asperger syndrome and his mother has dyslexia. In 2017, Rivera was sentenced to 35 months in prison. Marzo is a native of San Diego.
