= Bobby Martinez =

American surfer (born 1982)

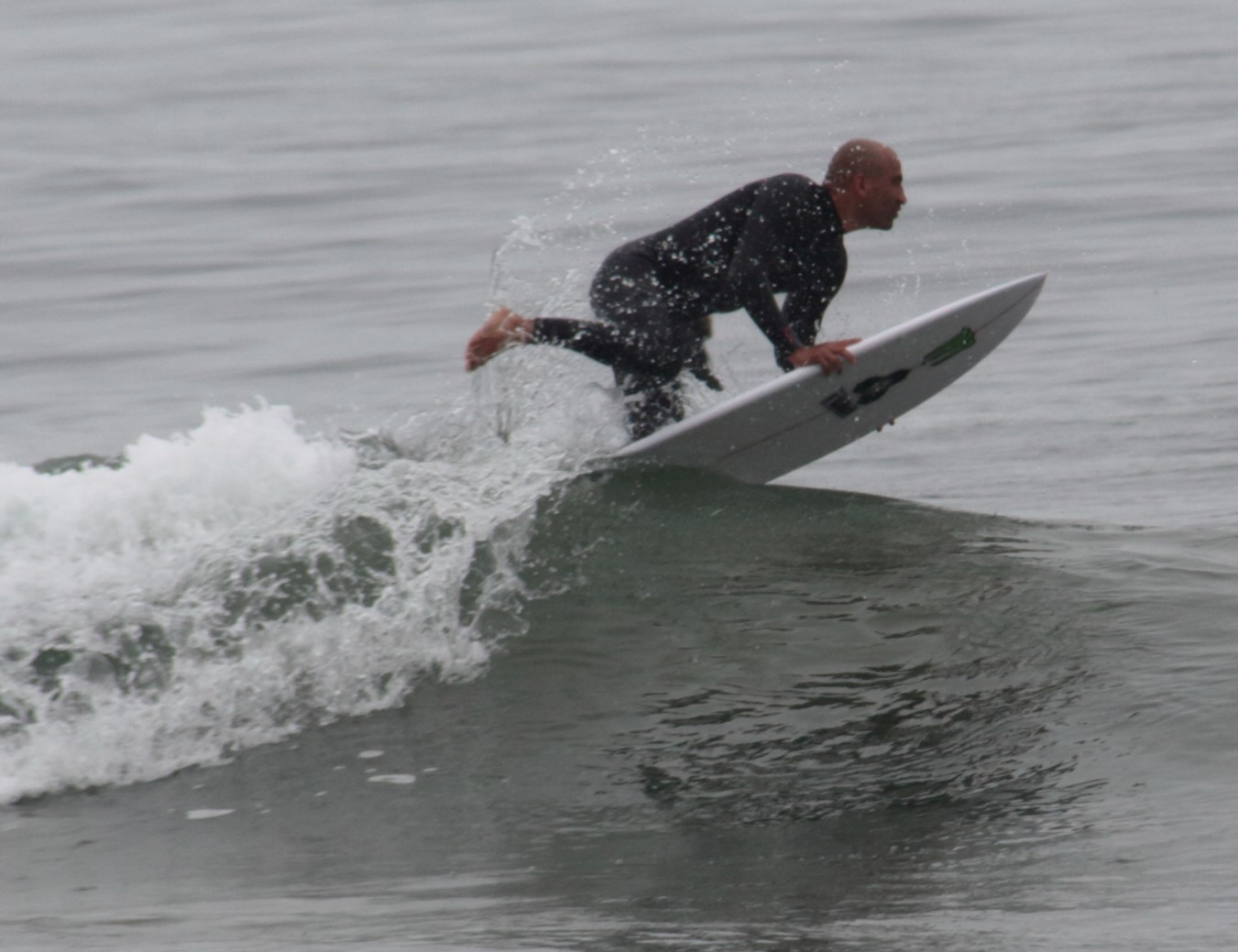
Bobby Martinez surfing at Rincon Point, CA in June, 2019

Bobby Martinez (born May 26, 1982) is an American professional surfer from Santa Barbara, California.

== Career ==
Martinez began surfing at age 6. When he was old enough, he joined the National Scholastic Surfing Association (NSSA) where he went on to win a record seven national titles. After several injury-prone years he joined the Association of Surfing Professionals (ASP) in 2005 and permanently pursued qualification for the ASP World Championship Tour (WCT). His first major title as a professional was the O'Neill Coldwater Classic in 2005. He joined the World Championship Tour in 2006, finishing the year with a No. 5 ranking which earned him Rookie of the Year honors with wins in Teahupoo and Mundaka. He also won in Mundaka in 2007. In May 2009, Martinez won the Billabong Pro Tahiti for the second time.

He featured in the 2007 biopic Mixed Tape, produced by Pete Santa Maria.

Notable sponsors during his career included O'Neill, Reef Brazil, Channel Islands Surfboards, Monster Energy Drink, and FTW.

== End of ASP career ==
On September 7, 2011 Martinez was suspended from competition by the ASP after publicly criticizing the organization in a post-heat interview with commentator Todd Kline. Disillusioned with the implementation of a new ASP international ranking system modeled after professional tennis, Martinez had skipped the J-Bay and Tahiti contests earlier in the year due to poor wave quality, resulting in the implementation of a new ASP policy establishing fines and suspensions for surfers who miss Championship Tour competition without medical release. This had further strained his relationship with the restructured ASP, which was positioning itself for rebranding and new investment as the World Surf League.

With a 2011 World No. 22 ranking that left him in danger of being relegated to surfing's second tier (the Qualifying Series, then known as the World Qualifying Series) after the upcoming mid-year cutoff, Martinez had already announced that New York would be his final competition. While being interviewed after defeating Australian surfer Bede Durbidge at the Quiksilver New York Pro (Long Beach, New York), he blasted officials and surfers advocating for a new ranking system during a publicly broadcast interview. Martinez had been a long-time critic of the ASP's controversial rankings system, but his profane rant—streamed on beachside big screens and live over the Internet broadcast—left event organisers and ASP officials furious. He was immediately disqualified from the event and suspended indefinitely pending an ASP rules committee meeting.

He retired from professional competition before the ASP arrived at a final disciplinary decision. Martinez has stated that had he earned a solid result in New York, and that he had intended to compete at Ocean Beach, San Francisco and at Pipeline, but that he had no intention of competing at Trestles or continuing to travel or chase the tour.

In the weeks after the incident, Martinez launched a barrage of incendiary tweets against former teammates and ASP officials. He explained the incident as his way of making light of the situation and venting about longstanding frustrations with industry personalities and institutions, in particular his former sponsor Reef.

== Notable victories ==
- Billabong Pro, Teahupoo, Tahiti (2006, 2009)
- Billabong Pro, Mundaka, Basque Country (2006, 2007)

== Personal life ==
Martinez is of Mexican descent. He married his wife Cleo, who is Australian, in February 2009. They have one daughter.

Martinez is an avid recreational boxer and trains regularly at Santa Barbara gyms, including Primo Boxing Club on the Eastside.

On June 7, 2012, Martinez signed on with the now-closed Homegrown Surf Shop in Ventura, after finding out that the owner was his long-lost cousin. He was also briefly sponsored by now-defunct brand FTW. He retains sponsorship by Monster Energy Drink and Channel Islands Surfboards.
