= Minorcans of Florida =

Floridian settlers

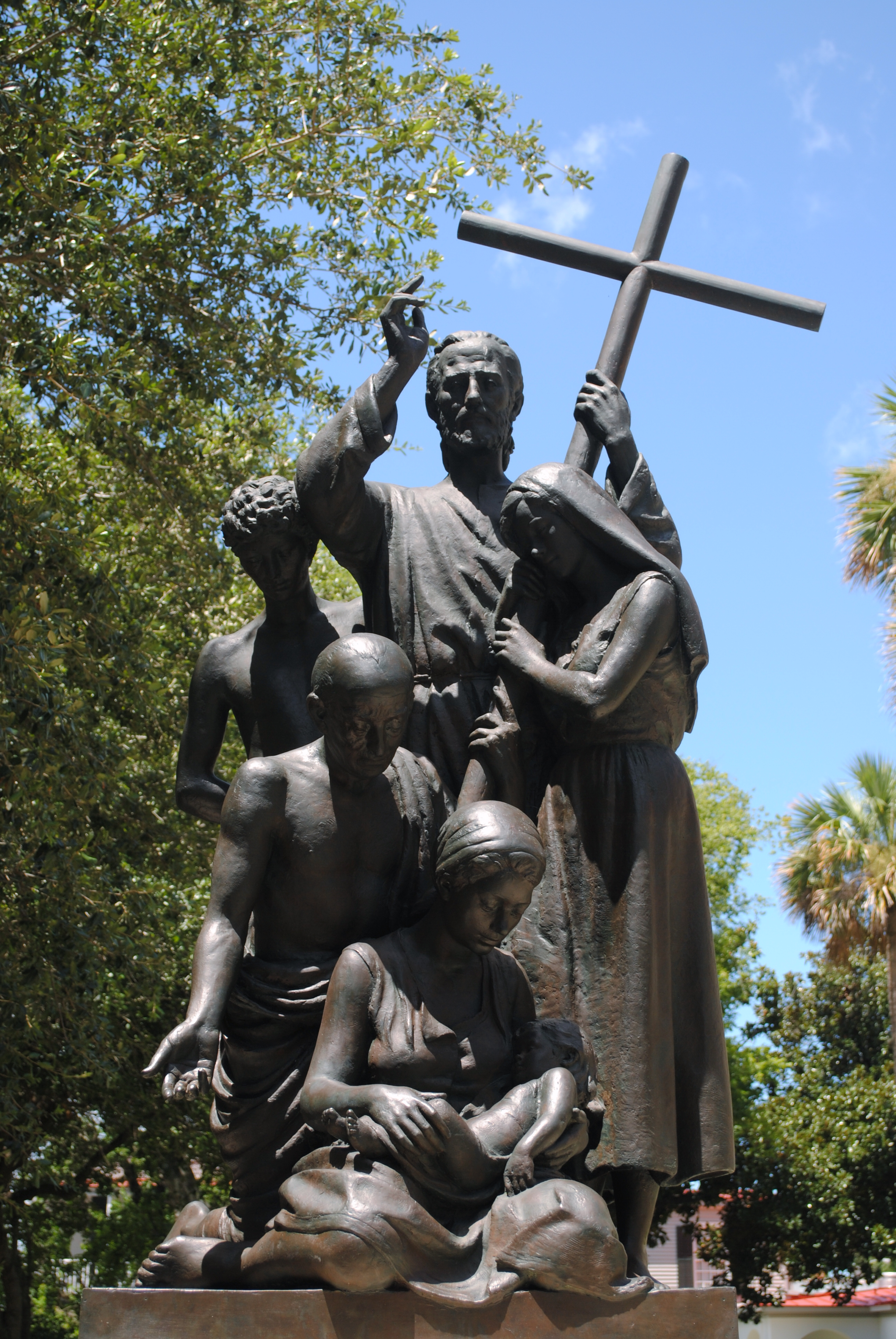
Statue near Cathedral Basilica of St. Augustine: Monument to Father Pedro Camps from Mercadal in the gardens of the Cathedral of St. Augustine (Florida). The priest Pedro Camps arrived in San Agustín in 1768 and was the spiritual guide of the Menorcan colony for 22 years.

The Minorcans of Florida (also spelled Menorcan) are an ethnically diverse group of people in Florida that trace their origins to the settlers of the New Smyrna colony founded in 1768. The majority of the settlers came from the Spanish island of Menorca, with others coming from Corsica, Italy, Greece and present-day Turkey. The colony failed, resulting in the deaths of most colonists, and the 600 survivors fled for St. Augustine in 1777. The Minorcans are noted for their contributions to Florida's history, culture and cuisine, and their descendants number more than 20,000 in St. Johns County, Florida today.

== Land grant ==
The Treaty of Paris of 1763 passed Florida from the hands of Spain to Great Britain. King George III issued the Royal Proclamation of 1763 to promote settlement of the newly acquired territory. Dr. Andrew Turnbull and his partners, Sir William Duncan and Sir Richard Grenville, held the title to over 100,000 acres of land in the newly acquired territory. Turnbull started with a plan to relocate 500 Greeks to cultivate indigo on the 20,000 acres allocated to Grenville. He arrived at Mahón on Menorca in June of 1767, then traveled onward to Livorno (Leghorn), Italy to recruit more workers. Those that signed up were sent back to Menorca. In the meantime agents found Corsican Greeks willing to sign up as well. He did not have as much luck on mainland Greece, with only a little more than 200 signing on, but when Turnbull returned to Mahón in February he found that many of the Italian men had married Menorcan women, and approximately 1,000 Menorcans joined the project. On 17 April 1768 Turnbull left Menorca with eight ships carrying 1403 colonists, of whom 148 died on the way and the New Smyrna colony, before arriving at the new colony on Mosquito Inlet, 70 miles south of St. Augustine.

== Plantation and privation ==
The conditions on the plantation were harsh, exacerbated by a supply ship wrecking before reaching the colony. The colony itself was not cleared and consisted of mangrove swamps, which the workers had to drain and clear prior to erecting additional shelter, as Turnbull had only provisioned for 500 workers. Fear of local Native American tribes, as well as local wildlife such as alligators, kept the colonists from venturing far from the village where more food could be procured.

The working & living conditions led to three hundred colonists seizing a ship and sailing south during the first years. They were captured by a British frigate and brought to St. Augustine. They were sent back to the colony, except for two who were executed. Workers who were seen as slacking were beaten, stockaded, or chained to heavy iron balls.

Despite the privations experienced, the settlers were able to clear land, plant crops, and erect housing. The situation became more stable between 1771 and 1773, but severe droughts were encountered in 1773 and 1775. By the end of 1768 a total of 450 people had died. Nearly 1,000 workers died in less than 10 years from malnutrition, malaria, scurvy and gangrene. Indigo production never yielded what was hoped for due to drought and soil depletion, and the colony was in debt from the start. Turnbull and his associates spent over 40,000 pounds during this period.

== Leaving for St. Augustine ==
The Minorcans were contracted as indentured servants for a specified number of years, in exchange for land and freedom. Most of the workers believed that their contracts would end in 9 years, but Turnbull felt that the nine years began only after the plantation's debts had been paid. In the fall of 1777, the workers had decided enough was enough, and several of them walked to St. Augustine to petition the East Florida governor, Patrick Tonyn, to release them from their contracts. Tonyn gave refuge to the workers, granted them an area in the northwest section of the old walled city, helping to form the core of St. Augustine. The Minorcans practiced farming, fishing, and trades. The Peace of Paris in 1783 returned Florida to Spain, and the Minorcans threw their lot in with them, and stayed in St. Augustine when Florida joined the United States.

== Current times ==
Today 20,000–26,000 descendants reside in St. Johns County. One large contribution that the Minorcans have made to St. Augustine is their cuisine. Specialties include Minorcan clam chowder, pilau (seasoned rice with boiled meat), and fromajardis (cheese pastries). Datil peppers also feature in several dishes. In the 1980s the Menorcan Cultural Society was founded to preserve and promote Minorcan heritage and culture. Minorcans are mentioned seven times in the 1959 novel, Alas, Babylon, by Pat Frank. A Menorcan Heritage Celebration is held annually in St. Augustine.
