= Chris Isaac =

American gridiron football player (1959–2020)

Profile
- Position: Quarterback

Personal information
- Born: May 15, 1959; New Smyrna Beach, Florida, U.S.
- Died: October 19, 2020 (aged 61); Holly Hill, Florida, U.S.

Career information
- High school: New Smyrna Beach (New Smyrna Beach, Florida)
- College: Eastern Kentucky
- NFL draft: 1982: undrafted

Career history
- 1982–83: Ottawa Rough Riders

Awards and highlights
- CFL's Most Outstanding Rookie Award (1982); Frank M. Gibson Trophy (1982)

Christopher Dwight Isaac (May 15, 1959 – October 19, 2020) was an American professional football player who was a quarterback with the Ottawa Rough Riders of the Canadian Football League (CFL). He played college football for the Eastern Kentucky Colonels.

== Career ==
After starring as a quarterback at New Smyrna Beach High School in Florida, Isaac played college football at Eastern Kentucky University from 1978 through 1981. In three of those years, the Colonels appeared in the NCAA Division I Football Championship game, winning in 1979.

Isaac subsequently joined Ottawa of the CFL for the 1982 season. In his first start, he set the team record with 471 yards passing and tied a record with five touchdown passes. He finished the year with 18 touchdown passes and 3,408 passing yards, and won the CFL's Most Outstanding Rookie Award. He could not repeat this success, playing only one more year in the CFL, as he appeared in 11 games in 1983 and lost the starting quarterback job to J.C. Watts.

After his playing career ended, Isaac worked as an assistant coach at several high schools and colleges, including Bethune-Cookman College. He has also been a mathematics teacher at Pine Ridge High School in Deltona, Florida. Isaac was inducted to the Eastern Kentucky athletic hall of fame in 2012.
