= Andrew Turnbull (colonist) =

Scottish physician and diplomat (1718–1792)

Consul to the Ottoman Empire

Personal details
- Born: Andrew Turnbull; 1718 Scotland
- Died: March 13, 1792 (aged 73–74) Charleston County, South Carolina, U.S.
- Resting place: Saint Philip's Episcopal Church Cemetery, Charleston, South Carolina, U.S.
- Spouse: Maria Gracia Dura Bin (or Maria Gracia Rubini)

Andrew Turnbull (1718 – March 13, 1792) was a Scottish physician, diplomat and colonist who founded the colony of New Smyrna in British East Florida. His venture recruited 1400 settlers from present-day Greece, Turkey, Italy, Corsica and the Spanish island of Menorca to work as indentured servants on a massive plantation complex.

New Smyrna was established in 1768 but was soon derailed by poor living conditions and mistreatment by Turnbull and his overseers. Following the deaths of a majority of the colonists, the 600 survivors abandoned the settlement and marched to St. Augustine in 1777. New Smyrna established the Florida Minorcan population and the modern town of New Smyrna Beach was incorporated on the site in 1887.

Previously, Turnbull served as the British consul at Smyrna, now known as İzmir, in the Ottoman Empire. His Florida colony was named for the city, the birthplace of his wife Maria Gracia Dura Bin.

== Biography ==
In 1768, he founded the colony of New Smyrna, Florida, named in honor of his wife's birthplace, the ancient Greek city of Smyrna (now İzmir) on the Aegean coast of Anatolia. Turnbull was married to Gracia Dura Bin (also cited as Maria Gracia Rubini), the daughter of a Greek merchant from Smyrna. His colony was located in the province of British East Florida, and encompassed some 101,400 acres (410 km^{2}); it was nearly three times the size of the colony at Jamestown.

In partnership with Sir William Duncan he secured a grant of 40,000 acres (160 km^{2}) of land on the east coast of the peninsula, with the requirement from the British government that it be settled within 10 years in the proportion of one person for every 100 acres (400,000 m^{2}). In 1765 he sailed to St. Augustine, the capital of the province, and secured the grant from Governor James Grant. The land was located at what is now New Smyrna Beach about 62 miles (100 km) south of St. Augustine. Turnbull then returned to England, secured financing for his forthcoming venture through bounties from the government and the Board of Trade, and subsequently sailed for the Mediterranean to find colonists "for a Tract of Land in East Florida on which I might settle a small Colony of Greeks," as Turnbull explained in a letter to Lord Shelburne.

One of Turnbull's prospective partners in the venture was Francis Levett, an English factor working in Livorno for the Levant Company. From a powerful English mercantile family with extensive trading connections, Levett hoped to use his influence in the Levant to supply Greek laborers to Turnbull's new colony. Levett then left London, where he had relocated, and settled in British East Florida, where he was granted a 10,000-acre (40 km^{2}) plantation by Governor Grant. His collaboration with Turnbull apparently came to naught.

In June 1767, Turnbull arrived with his ships in the Mediterranean, where he visited Mahon, Menorca; Livorno, Italy; Smyrna, Asia Minor; Melos, Mani, Koroni, Methoni in Greece; Crete; Santorini; and Corsica. He encountered opposition from French, Italian, and Turkish authorities, who did not want to see their subjects leave, but after persistent efforts, he finally rounded up over 1,400 indentured servants, the majority from Menorca, and left for his new colony in East Florida. In his contract, Turnbull made promises for his colonists to work for three years, after which they would be freed and given a title to fifty acres; however he never fulfilled this promise.

Turnbull's settlers eventually succeeded in producing crops of high quality indigo, hemp and sugarcane for making rum, but the plantation suffered major losses due to insect-borne diseases and Native American raids. Meanwhile, tensions grew between Turnbull and the colonists because of his neglect and mistreatment by his overseers. The remaining colonists marched north in 1777 to St. Augustine along the King's Road to complain of this mistreatment to Governor Patrick Tonyn, and permanently abandoned New Smyrna when he offered them sanctuary. In 1783 Florida was returned to the Spanish, and Turnbull left his plantation to retire in Charleston, South Carolina.

== Honors ==
- In World War II, the United States Liberty ship SS Andrew Turnbull was named in his honor.
