= Gracia Dura Bin =

Maria Gracia Dura Bin

Gracia Maria Turnbull (née Robin, also reported as Maria Gracia Rubini; died August 2, 1798) was the daughter of a wealthy French merchant, Jean Baptiste Robin, in Smyrna, Ottoman Empire, in what is now Turkey. Her name has been recorded in places as Dura Bin, a mis-transcription of 'du Robin'. She married Dr. Andrew Turnbull, a former British Consul at Smyrna, in Smyrna in 1853. who organized the largest attempt at British colonization in the New World by founding New Smyrna, Florida, named in honor of Gracia's birthplace. New Smyrna, Florida Colony, founded in 1768, encompassed some 101,400 acres (410 km^{2}).

With her husband, she left Florida and went to Charleston, South Carolina, in 1781. They both joined the South Carolina Medical Society as some of its earliest members.
