= Menorcan dialect =

Dialect of Catalan spoken in Menorca, Spain

Menorcan
- menorquí
- Native to: Spain
- Region: Menorca
- Language family: Indo-European: Italic; Romance; Western Romance; Gallo-Romance; Occitano-Romance; Catalan; Eastern; Insular; Balearic; Menorcan
- Early forms: Proto-Indo-European: Proto-Italic; Old Latin; Vulgar Latin; Proto-Romance; Old Occitan; Old Catalan
- Dialects: Eastern; Western; Floridan †
- Writing system: Catalan

Language codes
- ISO 639-3: –
- ISO 639-6: mnrq
- Glottolog: meno1253
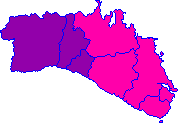
- Western Menorcan Eastern Menorcan

Menorcan or Minorcan (Catalan: menorquí) is a dialect of Catalan spoken on the island of Menorca, one of the Balearic Islands. It is very similar linguistically to the dialects of Catalan spoken in the other islands: Mallorquí in Mallorca and Eivissenc in Ibiza. It also has many similarities to English and French, as well as containing anglicisms of the British rule on the island. Some examples are xoc ('chalk'), boínder ('bow-window') or bòtil ('bottle').

Until the 17th century, the Minorcan subdialect had been a very uniform variant of Eastern Catalan (and therefore, with few differentiating points Balearic), and today it is still in certain aspects, especially by the closure of unstressed /o/ in [ʊ], which is one of the main differences that the phonetics of Menorca presents in relation to Mallorca (except for Sóller and its dialect, which otherwise has some points of resemblance to that of Ciutadella).

== Traits ==
A point in which Menorca remained outside the evolutionary process of continental Catalan was with the use of stressed "ə", which was general throughout the island. This uniformity is maintained until the end of the 19th century. From the twentieth century, the stressed "ə" became in a closed "e" in Maó, and the same transfer was made in Alaior and Mercadal. Instead, in Ferreries and Ciutadella, the neutral sound had been maintained, partly for psychological reasons, according to the statement of Francesc de Borja Moll i Casasnovas, for the reaction of the ciutadelenses against the mahoneses, a consequence of secular antipathies. The pronunciation of the closed "e" of Mahon has been mocked by the ciutadelenses, and that has inhibited the progression of its use in the western sector of the island.

Another notable difference between the cities of the island, Mahón and Ciutadella, is the intonation.

Not so resistant had shown the western sector of the island with the influence coming from Catalonia to Mahón of the morphemes flexives -és, -essis, -essin. Sixty years ago, the primitive forms -às, -assis, -assin were substituted in Ciutadella.

In the treatment of the atonic group "ua", the Menorcan follows the example of the Mallorcan and removes the last vowel, but pronouncing "u" instead of "o": aigu, llegu, Pascu.

The weak "i" between vowels is lost, although in the imperfect preterite in western Menorquín, the "i" is kept, pronouncing deia, veía, etc. The loss of the "ll" is also given: gúə (agulla), véə (vella), fúə (fulla), uréə (orella), páə (palla). This same phenomenon occurs in certain villas in Mallorca, especially in Sóller, Alcúdia and Capdepera.
