= Eric Geiselman =

American surfer

Personal information
- Born: March 9, 1988 (age 38) New Smyrna Beach, Florida, U.S.
- Years active: 2004–present
- Height: 6 ft 0 in (183 cm)
- Weight: 165 lb (75 kg)

Surfing career
- Sport: Surfing
- Sponsors: Vissla, Globe, Monster Energy, Gorilla Surf, Red Dog Surf, Softech Surfboards, Orion Surfboards, Slater Designs.
- Major achievements: Three Time ESA East Coast Champion; Five Time NSSA East Coast Champion; Two Time Back to Back North American Pro Junior Champion; 20 under 20 the Best Young Surfers in the World / Eric Geiselman #8

Surfing specifications
- Stance: Regular (natural) foot
- Shaper(s): Dad (Greg Geiselman), aka Lala
- Quiver: 6'1" x 18.38" x 2.2" squash

Eric Geiselman (born March 9, 1988) is an American professional surfer who, in November 2009, had his surfboard snapped in half by what was thought to be a great white shark, whilst surfing off Lagunda Road, Santa Cruz, California. He also has a younger brother Evan, who has won 12 East Coast Championship titles.

He appeared on the television show New Pollution.
