= Surfers Healing =

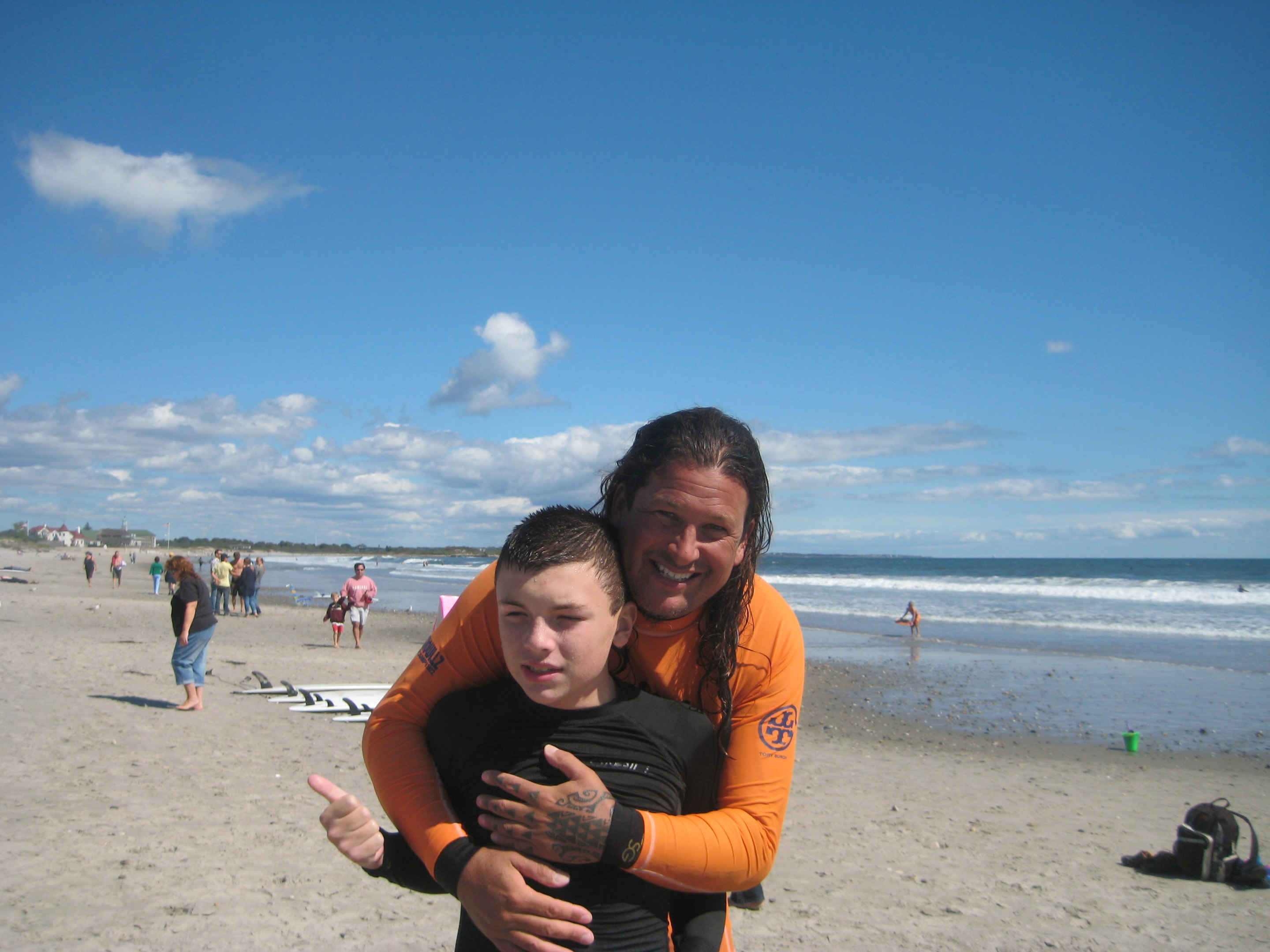
Founder Israel "Izzy" Paskowitz

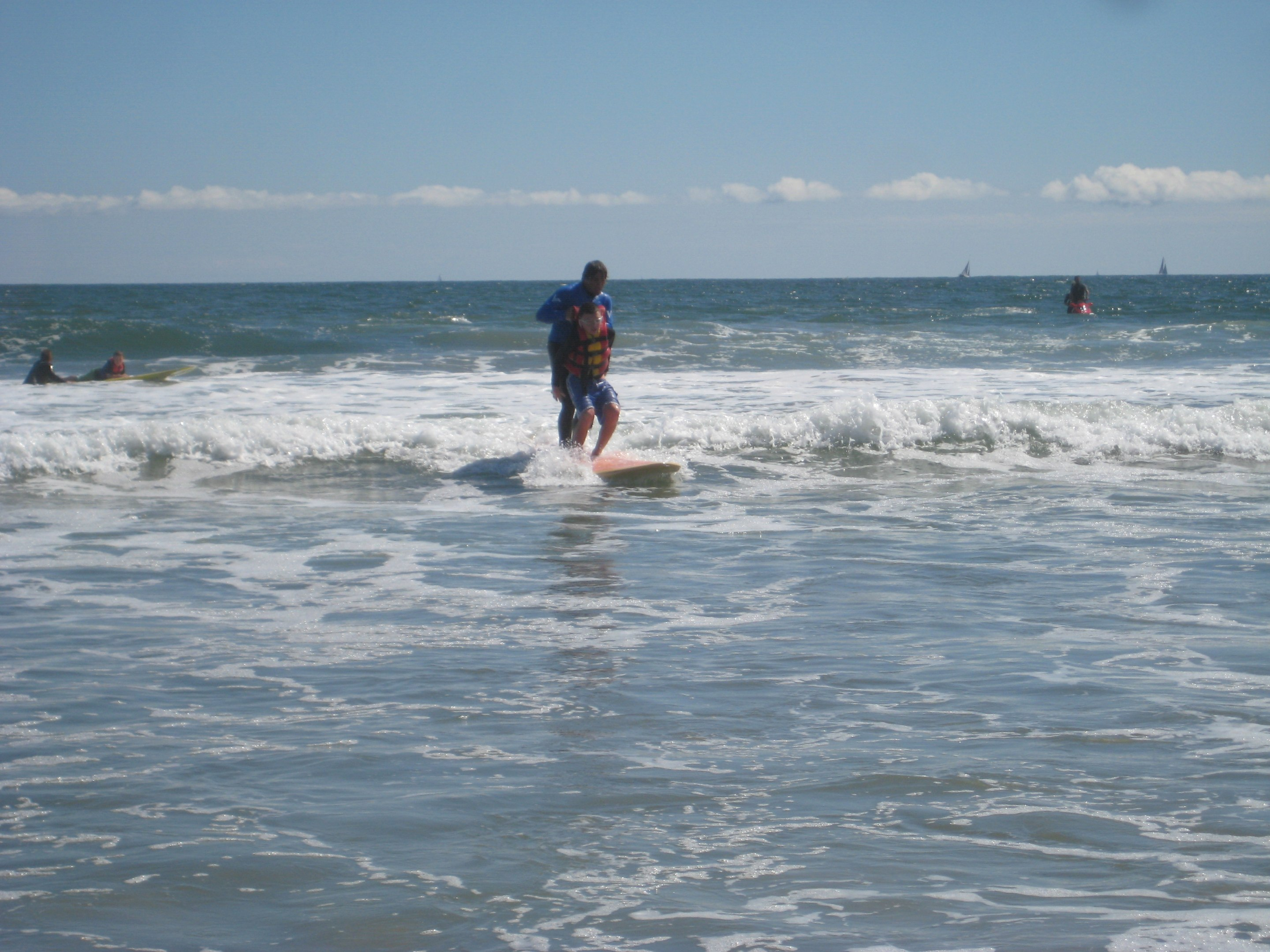
Surfers Healing at Narragansett, Rhode Island

Surfers Healing is a non-profit organization that teaches children with autism to surf. It was founded by Israel and Danielle Paskowitz for the benefit of their son Isaiah Paskowitz who was diagnosed with autism at age three. Surfers Healing seeks to enrich the lives of people living with autism by exposing them to surfing. The surf camps are free of charge to autistic children, and include camps in Hawaii, North Carolina, New Jersey, New York, Rhode Island, Virginia Beach and Puerto Rico. In August 2012, Surfers Healing expanded to Toronto, Canada for the first time organized by Aloha Toronto, an annual weekend beach festival inspired by Surfers Healing. The Kelly Slater Foundation is a supporter of Surfers Healing.

Israel Paskowitz is a former competitive surfer and owns Paskowitz Surf Camp and he found that the ocean was the one place where his son Isaiah seemed to find respite.

== Television ==
The Oprah Winfrey Network had a docu-series about the Paskowitz family called The Swell Life. Surfers Healing was also featured on CBS' Eye to Eye with Sandra Hughes.
