= New Smyrna Beach, Florida =

- City
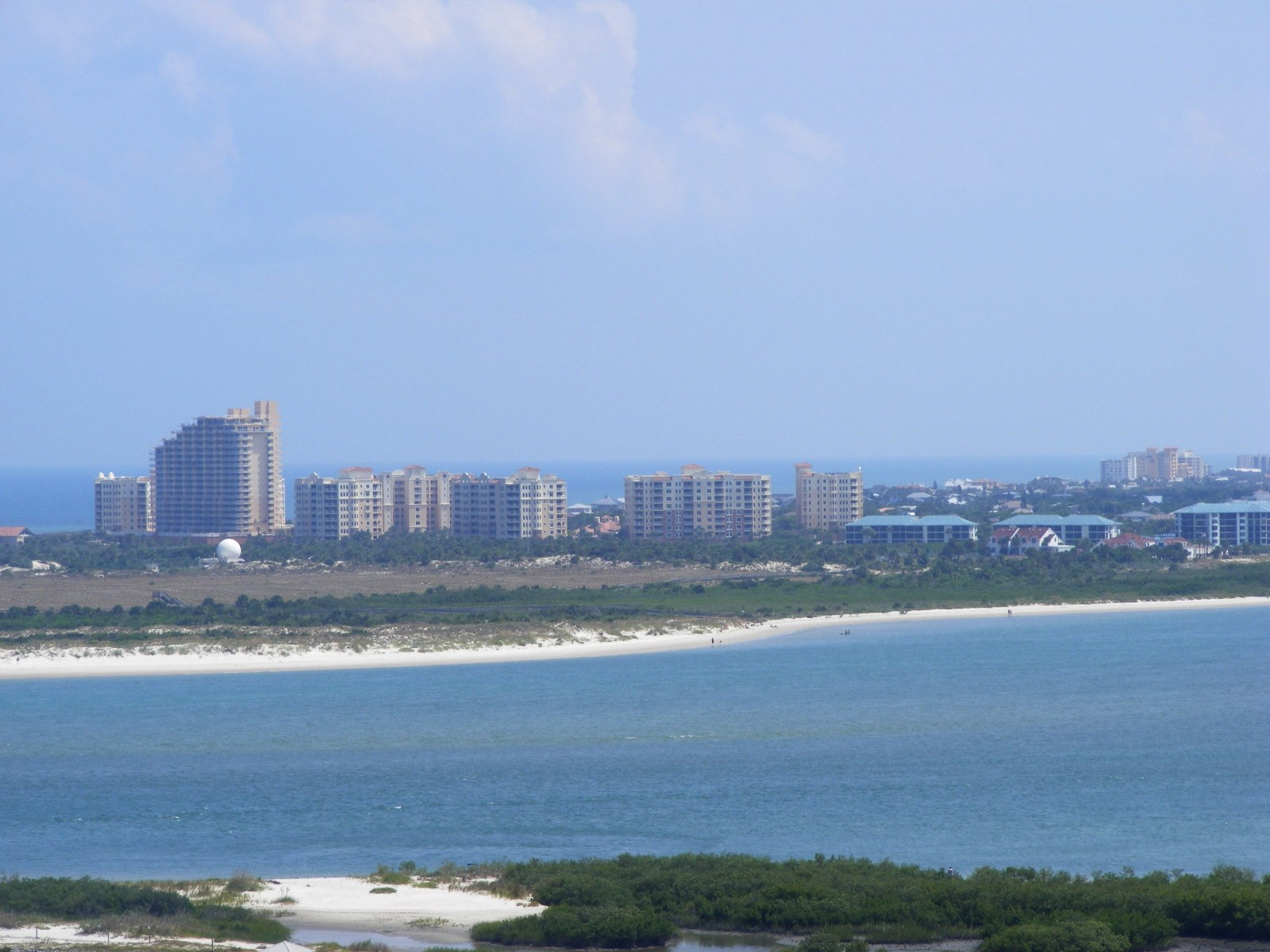
- New Smyrna Beach from observation deck on top of Ponce de León Inlet Light

- Seal
- Nickname: "Florida's Secret Pearl"
- Motto: Cygnus Inter Anates (Swan among Ducks)
- Location of New Smyrna Beach in Volusia County, Florida
- Coordinates: 29°01′28″N 80°55′37″W
- Country: United States
- State: Florida
- County: Volusia
- Settled (New Smyrna): 1768
- Incorporated (town) (New Smyrna): 1887
- Incorporated (city) (New Smyrna Beach): 1947

Government
  - Type: Commission–Manager
  - Mayor: Fred Cleveland
  - Vice Mayor: Valli Perrine
  - Commissioner: Lisa Martin; Jason McGuirk; Randy Hartman
  - City Manager: Khalid Resheidat
  - City Clerk: Kelly McQuillen

Area
  - City: 41.349 sq mi (107.093 km^{2})
  - Land: 37.842 sq mi (98.011 km^{2})
  - Water: 3.507 sq mi (9.083 km^{2})
- Elevation: 0 ft (0 m)

Population (2020)
  - City: 30,142
  - Estimate (2023): 32,655
  - Density: 863/sq mi (333.2/km^{2})
  - Urban: 402,126 (US: 104th)
  - Metro: 721,796 (US: 83rd)
- Time zone: UTC−5 (Eastern (EST))
  - Summer (DST): UTC−4 (EDT)
- ZIP Codes: 32168, 32169, 32170
- Area code: 386
- FIPS code: 12-48625
- GNIS feature ID: 2404367
- Sales tax: 6.5%
- Website: cityofnsb.com

New Smyrna Beach is a city in Volusia County, Florida, United States, located on the central east coast of the state, with the Atlantic Ocean to the east. The downtown section of the city is located on the west side of the Indian River and the Indian River Lagoon system. The Coronado Beach Bridge crosses the Intracoastal Waterway just south of Ponce de Leon Inlet, connecting the mainland with the beach on the coastal barrier island. The population was 30,142 at the 2020 census; according to 2023 census estimates, the city is estimated to have a population of 32,655.

The surrounding area offers many opportunities for outdoor recreation; these include fishing, sailing, motorboating, golfing, and hiking. Visitors participate in water sports of all kinds, including swimming, scuba diving, kitesurfing, and surfing. In July 2009, New Smyrna Beach was ranked number nine on the list of "best surf towns" in Surfer. It was recognized as one of the "world's top 20 surf towns" by National Geographic in 2012. It has also been dubbed the "shark attack capital of the world."

New Smyrna Beach's motto is cygnus inter anates, which is Latin for "a swan among ducks."

== History ==
Dr. Andrew Turnbull

The area was first settled by Europeans in 1768, when Scottish physician Dr. Andrew Turnbull, a friend of James Grant, the governor of British East Florida, established the colony of New Smyrna. Dr. Turnbull had married Gracia Dura Bin (some sources give her name as Maria Gracia Rubini), the daughter of a Greek London merchant from the Ottoman city of Smyrna (modern-day İzmir in Turkey) and named the settlement in honor of his wife's birthplace. (A number of the immigrants in his future labor force were Greeks from the Mani peninsula). No one had previously attempted to settle so many people at one time in a town in North America.

Turnbull recruited about 1,300 settlers, intending for them to grow hemp, sugarcane, and indigo, as well as to produce rum, at his plantation on the northeastern Atlantic coast of Florida. The majority of the colonists came from Menorca (historically called "Minorca" in English), one of the Mediterranean Balearic Islands of Spain, and were of Catalan culture and language.

Although the colony produced relatively large amounts of processed indigo in its first few years of operation, it eventually collapsed after suffering major losses due to insect-borne diseases and Indian raids, and growing tensions caused by mistreatment of the colonists on the part of Turnbull and his overseers. The survivors, about 600 in number, marched nearly 70 miles north on the King's Road and relocated to St. Augustine, where their descendants live to this day. In 1783, East and West Florida were returned to the Spanish, and Turnbull abandoned his colony to retire in Charleston, South Carolina.

The St. Photios Greek Orthodox National Shrine on St. George Street in St. Augustine honors the Greeks among the settlers of New Smyrna; they were the first Greek Orthodox followers in North America. The historical exhibit adjoining the chapel tells the story of their plight, with accompanying exhibits, and of their contributions to the city.

Central Florida remained sparsely populated by white settlers well into the 19th century, and it was frequently raided by Seminole Indians trying to protect their territory. United States troops fought against them in the Seminole Wars, but they were never completely dislodged.

During the Civil War, on March 23, 1862, portions of the 3rd Florida Infantry Regiment defeated a small U.S. naval force that was attempting to land near New Smyrna. Later on, in 1863, the "Stone Wharf" was shelled by Union gunboats.

In 1887, when New Smyrna was incorporated, it had a population of 150. In 1892, Henry Flagler provided service to the town via his Florida East Coast Railway. This led to a rapid increase in the area's population. Its economy grew as tourism was added to its citrus and commercial fishing industries.

During Prohibition in the 1920s, the city and its river islands were popular sites for moonshine stills and hideouts for rum runners, who came from the Bahamas through Mosquito Inlet, now Ponce de León Inlet. "New Smyrna" became "New Smyrna Beach" in 1947, when the city annexed the seaside community of Coronado Beach. Today, it is a resort town of over 20,000 permanent residents.

Like St. Augustine, established by the Spanish, New Smyrna has been under the rule of four "flags": the British, Spanish, United States (from 1821, with ratification of the Adams–Onís Treaty), and the Confederate Jack. After the end of the Civil War in 1865, it returned with Florida to the United States.

== Geography ==
According to the United States Census Bureau, the city has a total area of 41.349 square miles (107.09 km^{2}), of which 37.842 square miles (98.01 km^{2}) is land and 3.507 square miles (9.08 km^{2}) of it (9.09%) is covered by water. It is bordered by the city of Port Orange to the northwest, unincorporated Volusia County to the north, the census-designated place of Samsula-Spruce Creek to the west, and the cities of Edgewater and Bethune Beach and the Canaveral National Seashore to the south. Bounded on the east by the Atlantic Ocean, New Smyrna Beach is on the Indian River. The city is connected to other parts of the state by Interstate 95, U.S. Route 1, and State Road 44.

=== Climate ===
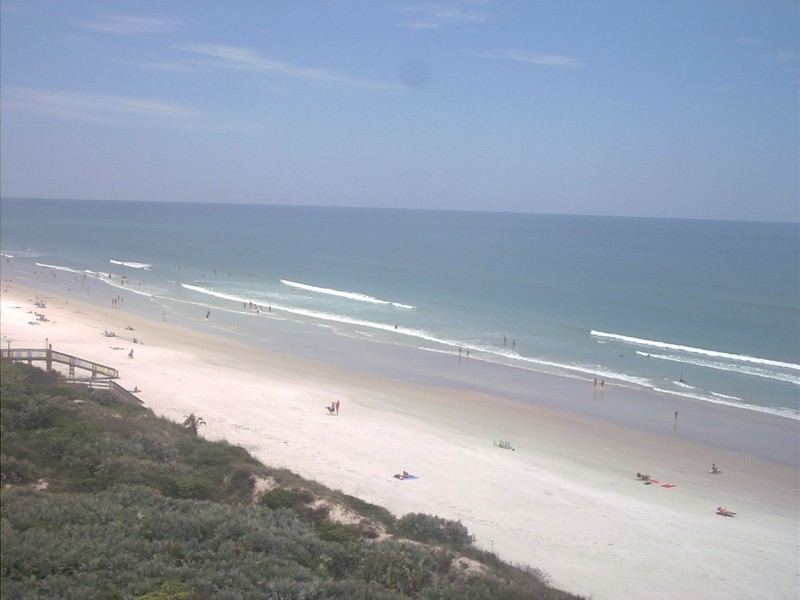
New Smyrna Beach

Like the rest of Florida north of Lake Okeechobee, New Smyrna Beach has a humid subtropical (Köppen Cfa) climate characterized by hot, humid summers and warm, mostly dry winters. The rainy season lasts from May until October, and the dry season, from November to April. New Smyrna averages only about two freezes per year, and many species of subtropical plants and palms are grown in the area. The city has recorded snowfall only three times in its 250-year history. The summers are long and hot, with frequent severe thunderstorms in the afternoon, as central Florida is the lightning capital of North America. Winters are pleasant with frequent sunny skies and dry weather.

Weather hazards include hurricanes from June until November, though direct hits are rare. Hurricane Charley exited over New Smyrna Beach on August 13, 2004, after crossing the state in a northeastern direction from its initial landfall in Punta Gorda. The storm caused extensive damage to the beachside portion of the city and toppled many historic oak trees in the downtown area and along historic Flagler Avenue. New Smyrna was hit by Hurricane Ian in 2022, leading to flood damage for more than a thousand residents and one fatality, and by Hurricane Milton in 2024, causing power outages for almost 90% of local customers and further flooding in the local area.

Climate data for New Smyrna Beach, Florida (Marine Discovery Center), 1991–2020 normals, extremes 2001–present
Month	Jan	Feb	Mar	Apr	May	Jun	Jul	Aug	Sep	Oct	Nov	Dec	Year
Record high °F (°C)	85 (29)	88 (31)	93 (34)	92 (33)	98 (37)	101 (38)	98 (37)	99 (37)	98 (37)	92 (33)	91 (33)	87 (31)	101 (38)
Mean maximum °F (°C)	81.8 (27.7)	83.3 (28.5)	86.4 (30.2)	89.3 (31.8)	91.8 (33.2)	94.0 (34.4)	94.8 (34.9)	95.3 (35.2)	93.4 (34.1)	89.6 (32.0)	84.4 (29.1)	83.1 (28.4)	96.5 (35.8)
Mean daily maximum °F (°C)	68.1 (20.1)	70.1 (21.2)	73.4 (23.0)	79.3 (26.3)	83.2 (28.4)	86.8 (30.4)	88.4 (31.3)	88.5 (31.4)	86.2 (30.1)	82.1 (27.8)	75.9 (24.4)	71.4 (21.9)	79.5 (26.4)
Daily mean °F (°C)	60.0 (15.6)	61.4 (16.3)	65.0 (18.3)	71.0 (21.7)	75.8 (24.3)	79.8 (26.6)	81.6 (27.6)	81.6 (27.6)	80.3 (26.8)	75.2 (24.0)	69.1 (20.6)	62.8 (17.1)	72.0 (22.2)
Mean daily minimum °F (°C)	51.9 (11.1)	52.6 (11.4)	56.6 (13.7)	62.7 (17.1)	68.4 (20.2)	72.8 (22.7)	74.7 (23.7)	74.7 (23.7)	74.3 (23.5)	68.2 (20.1)	62.3 (16.8)	54.2 (12.3)	64.4 (18.0)
Mean minimum °F (°C)	34.3 (1.3)	37.6 (3.1)	42.0 (5.6)	51.4 (10.8)	59.1 (15.1)	67.9 (19.9)	70.1 (21.2)	71.0 (21.7)	68.2 (20.1)	54.6 (12.6)	45.2 (7.3)	38.6 (3.7)	32.3 (0.2)
Record low °F (°C)	27 (−3)	30 (−1)	38 (3)	43 (6)	50 (10)	62 (17)	67 (19)	60 (16)	62 (17)	44 (7)	30 (−1)	23 (−5)	23 (−5)
Average precipitation inches (mm)	2.76 (70)	2.47 (63)	3.00 (76)	2.62 (67)	3.72 (94)	7.45 (189)	6.06 (154)	6.47 (164)	6.88 (175)	4.49 (114)	2.32 (59)	2.32 (59)	50.56 (1,284)
Average precipitation days (≥ 0.01 in)	7.0	6.8	6.7	5.5	6.4	11.5	11.9	11.3	10.5	9.0	7.5	7.6	101.5
Source: NOAA (mean maxima/minima 2006–2020)

== Demographics ==
Historical population
Census	Pop.	Note	%±
1880	119		—
1890	287		141.2%
1900	543		89.2%
1910	1,121		106.4%
1920	2,007		79.0%
1930	4,149		106.7%
1940	4,402		6.1%
1950	5,775		31.2%
1960	8,781		52.1%
1970	10,580		20.5%
1980	13,557		28.1%
1990	16,543		22.0%
2000	20,048		21.2%
2010	22,464		12.1%
2020	30,142		34.2%
2023 (est.)	32,655	▲	8.3%
U.S. Decennial Census; 2020 Census

=== Racial and ethnic composition ===
New Smyrna Beach, Florida – Racial and ethnic composition (NH = Non-Hispanic) Note: the US Census treats Hispanic/Latino as an ethnic category. This table excludes Latinos from the racial categories and assigns them to a separate category. Hispanics/Latinos may be of any race.
Race / Ethnicity	Pop 2000	Pop 2010	Pop 2020	% 2000	% 2010	% 2020
White (NH)	18,141	19,951	25,900	90.5%	88.81%	85.93%
Black or African American (NH)	1,250	1,307	1,176	6.3%	5.82%	3.90%
Native American or Alaska Native (NH)	62	57	55	0.7%	0.25%	0.18%
Asian (NH)	101	244	368	%	1.09%	1.22%
Pacific Islander (NH)	4	1	14	0.0%	0.01%	0.05%
Some Other Race (NH)	14	9	101	%	0.04%	0.34%
Mixed/Multi-Racial (NH)	175	263	1,052	1.0%	1.17%	3.49%
Hispanic or Latino	301	632	1,476	1.5%	2.81%	4.90%
Total	20,048	22,464	30,142	100.0%	100.00%	100.00%

=== 2020 census ===
As of the 2020 census, New Smyrna Beach had a population of 30,142, with 14,796 households and 8,544 families. The population density was 798.7 inhabitants per square mile (308.4/km^{2}).

The median age was 58.3 years. 12.1% of residents were under the age of 18 and 36.8% were 65 years of age or older. For every 100 females there were 91.4 males, and for every 100 females age 18 and over there were 90.4 males age 18 and over.

80.1% of residents lived in urban areas, while 19.9% lived in rural areas.

Of these households, 14.7% had children under the age of 18 living in them. Of all households, 45.6% were married-couple households, 18.7% were households with a male householder and no spouse or partner present, and 29.2% were households with a female householder and no spouse or partner present. About 35.3% of all households were made up of individuals and 19.8% had someone living alone who was 65 years of age or older.

There were 20,903 housing units, of which 29.2% were vacant. The homeowner vacancy rate was 3.5% and the rental vacancy rate was 20.9%.

Racial composition as of the 2020 census
Race	Number	Percent
White	26,358	87.4%
Black or African American	1,206	4.0%
American Indian and Alaska Native	77	0.3%
Asian	369	1.2%
Native Hawaiian and Other Pacific Islander	15	0.0%
Some other race	362	1.2%
Two or more races	1,755	5.8%
Hispanic or Latino (of any race)	1,476	4.9%

=== 2010 census ===
As of the 2010 census, there were 22,464 people, 11,074 households, and 6,322 families residing in the city. The population density was 648.4 inhabitants per square mile (250.3/km^{2}). There were 16,847 housing units averaged 520.6 per square mile (201.0/km^{2}). The racial makeup of the city was 90.8% White, 5.9% African American, 0.3% Native American, 1.1% Asian, 0.0% Pacific Islander, 0.5% from some other races and 1.4% from two or more races. Hispanic or Latino of any race were 2.8% of the population.

Of the 11,074 households, 14.8% had children under the age of 18 living with them, 44.1% were married couples living together, 9.4% had a female householder with no husband present, and 42.9% were not families. About 35.3% of all households were made up of individuals, and 18.2% had someone living alone who was 65 years of age or older. The average household size was 2.01 and the average family size was 2.54.

In the city, the population was distributed as 13.9% under the age of 18, 3.6% from 20 to 24, 17.9% from 25 to 44, 31.3% from 45 to 64, and 31.6% who were 65 years of age or older. The median age was 54.3 years. About 35.3% of all households were made up of individuals, and 18.2% had someone living alone who was 65 years of age or older.

The median income for a household in the city was $49,625, and for a family was $62,267. Males had a median income of $38,132 versus $32,087 for females. The per capita income for the city was $31,013. About 10.9% of families and 13.0% of the population were below the poverty line, including 21.9% of those under age 18 and 8.3% of those aged 65 or over.

== Education ==
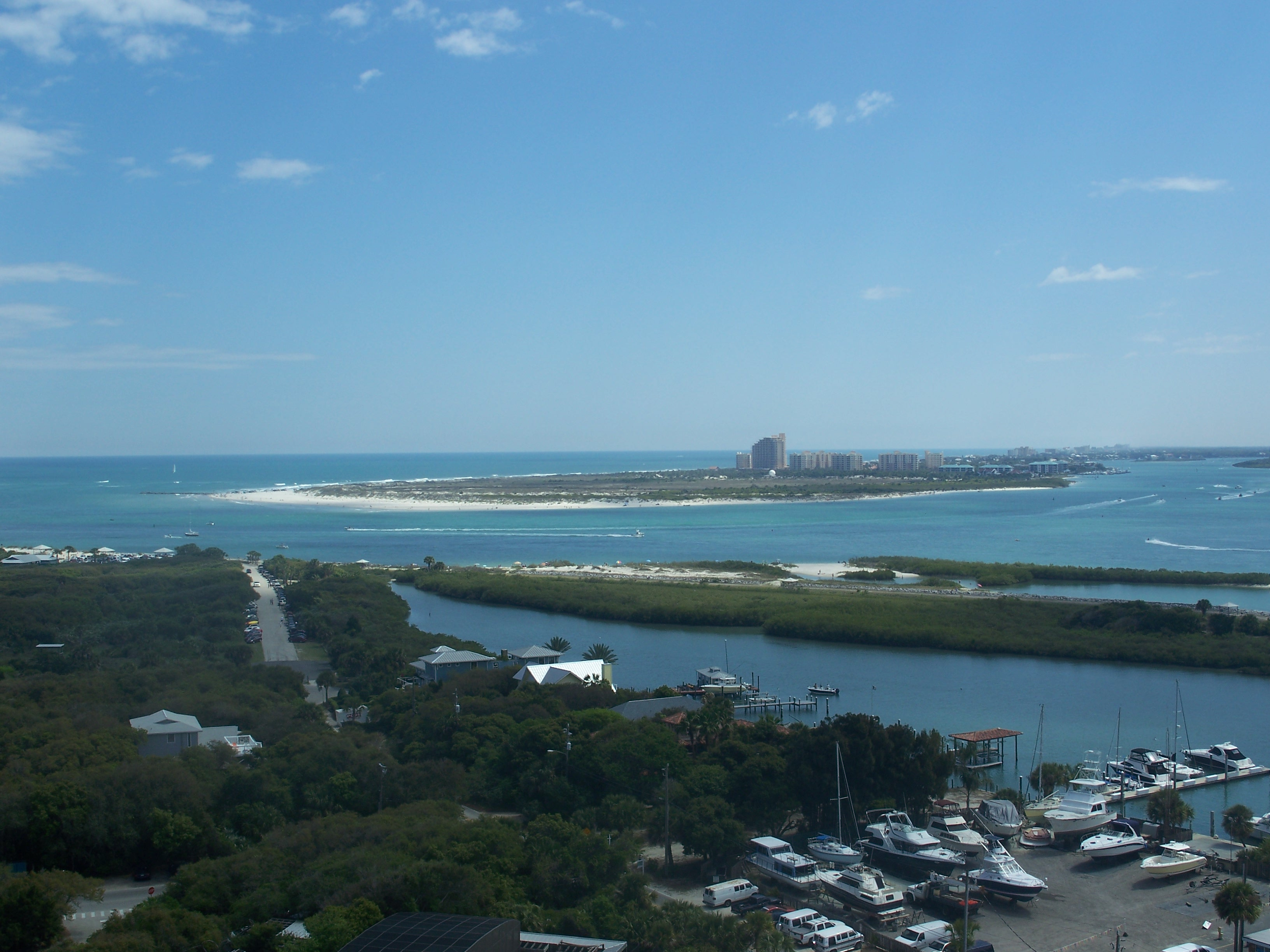
Oceanside view of New Smyrna Beach

All public education is run by Volusia County Schools.

=== Elementary schools ===
- Chisholm Elementary School
- Coronado Beach Elementary School
- Indian River Elementary School
- Read-Pattillo Elementary School

=== Middle school ===
- New Smyrna Beach Middle School

=== High school ===
- New Smyrna Beach High School

=== Charter school ===
- Burns Science and Technology (K-12)

=== Private School ===
- Sacred Heart School (private Catholic, K-8)

=== Higher education ===
- Daytona State College (New Smyrna Beach Campus)

== Culture ==
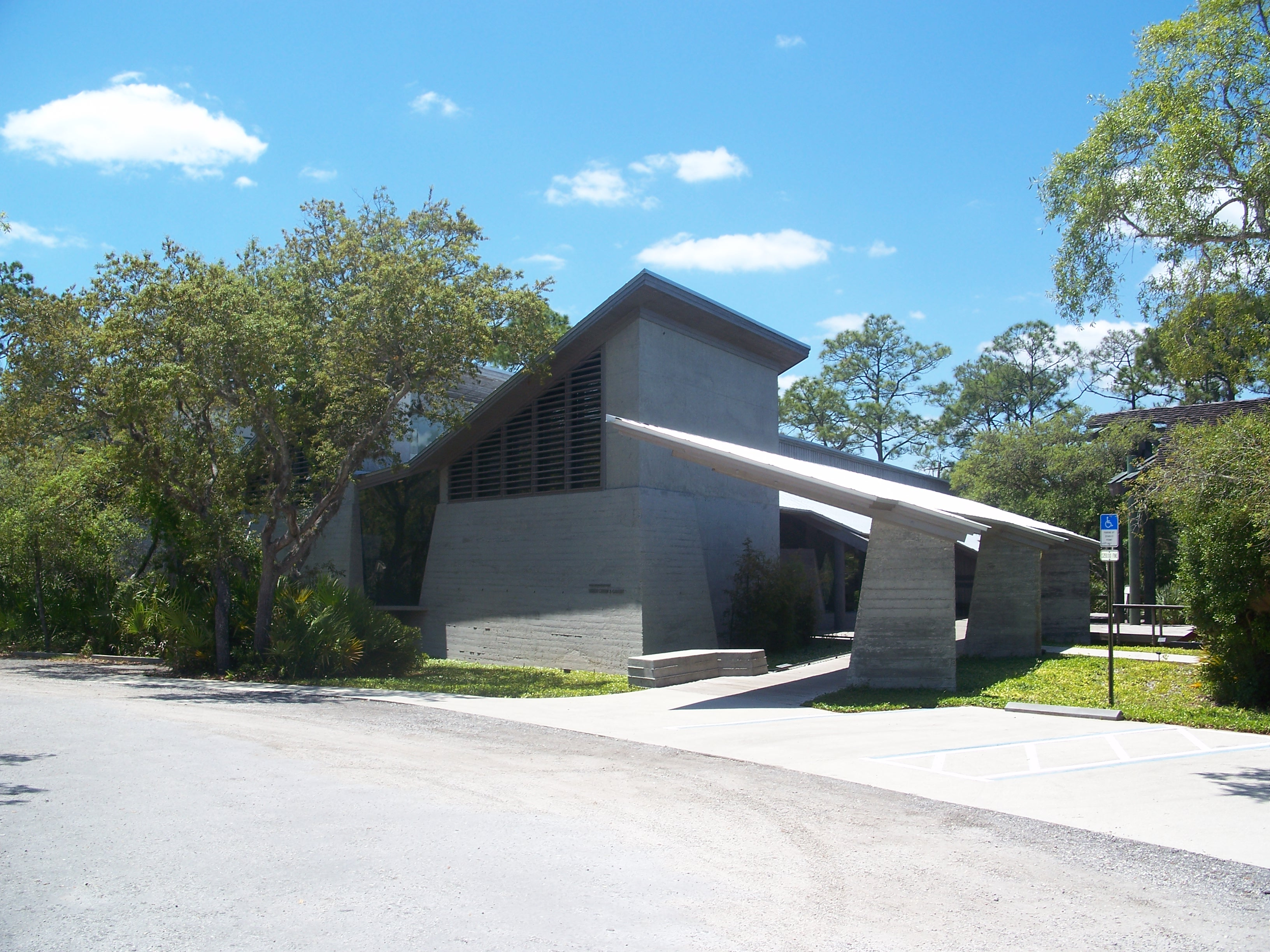
Atlantic Center for the Arts: Pabst Visitor Center and Gallery

Named one of "America's Top Small Cities for the Arts", New Smyrna Beach is home to the Atlantic Center for the Arts, an artists-in-residence community and educational facility, the Harris House, the Little Theatre, and a gallery of fine arts, Arts on Douglas.

Popular amongst tourists, roosters roam the main street of the city, Flagler Avenue. They are thought to be a result of abandonment by locals (as only hens are permitted for personal use).

The New Smyrna Speedway is a half-mile paved racetrack opened in 1967 that currently hosts the ARCA Menards Series East, NASCAR Whelen Modified Tour, Southern Super Series and World Series of Asphalt Stock Car Racing.

== Shark attacks ==
According to the International Shark Attack File maintained by the University of Florida, in 2007, Volusia County had more confirmed shark bites than any other region in the world. Experts from the university have referred to the county as having the "dubious distinction as the world's shark-bite capital". The trend continued in 2008, when the town broke its own record, with 24 shark bites. An Orlando Sentinel photographer shot a picture of a four-foot spinner shark jumping over a surfer, a reversal of "jumping the shark". Sharks bit three different surfers on September 18, 2016, in the span of a few hours at the same beach. Very few of the shark bites are fatal. In July 2024, two men and a 14-year-old boy were bitten in three separate attacks in less than one week.

== Government ==
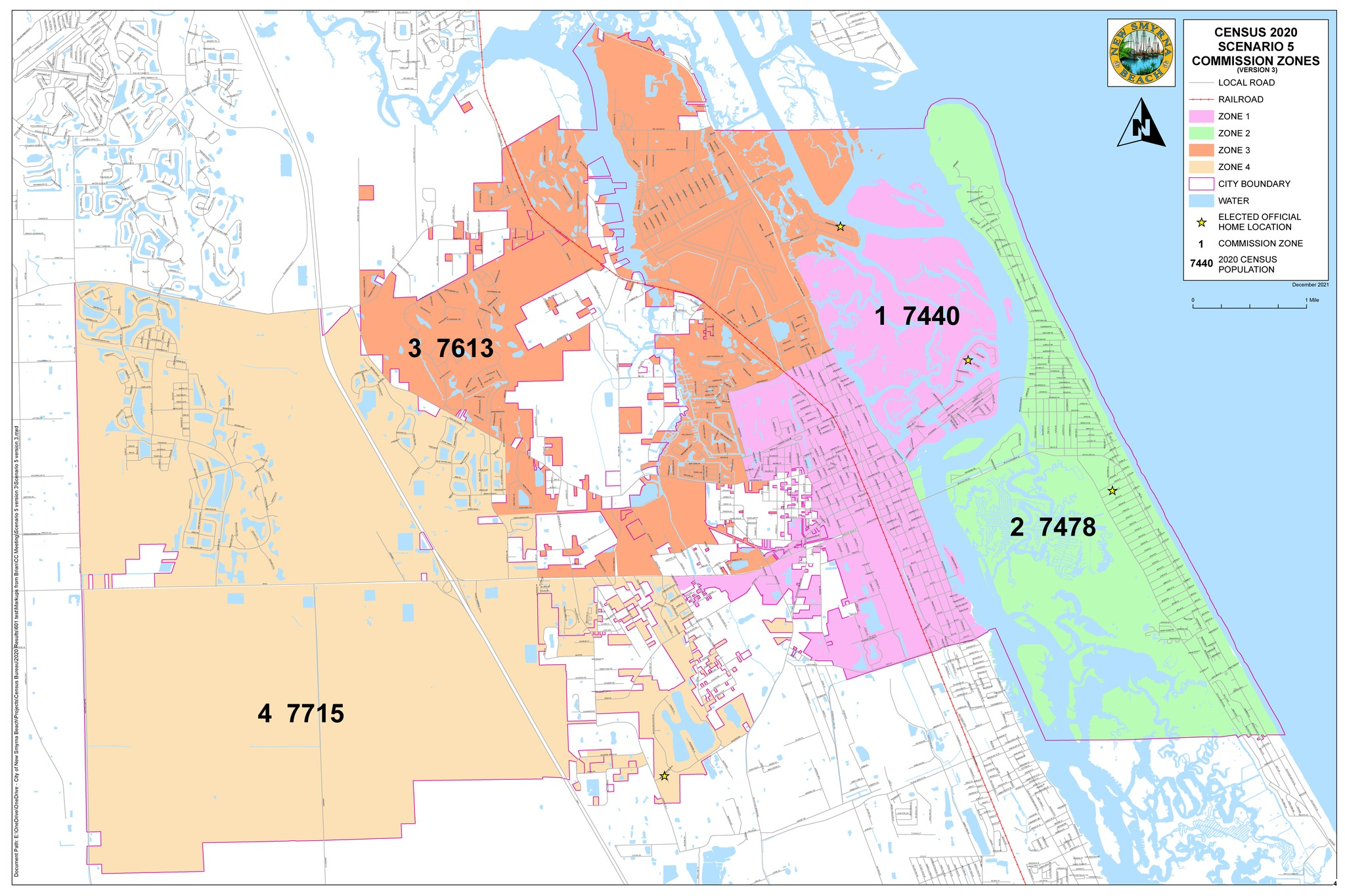
City Commission district map, 2025

The City of New Smyrna Beach operates under a commission-manager government. The mayor is independently elected citywide, in non-partisan elections, every two years. The city commission consists of four members, representing specific districts, elected to four-year terms in non-partisan elections.

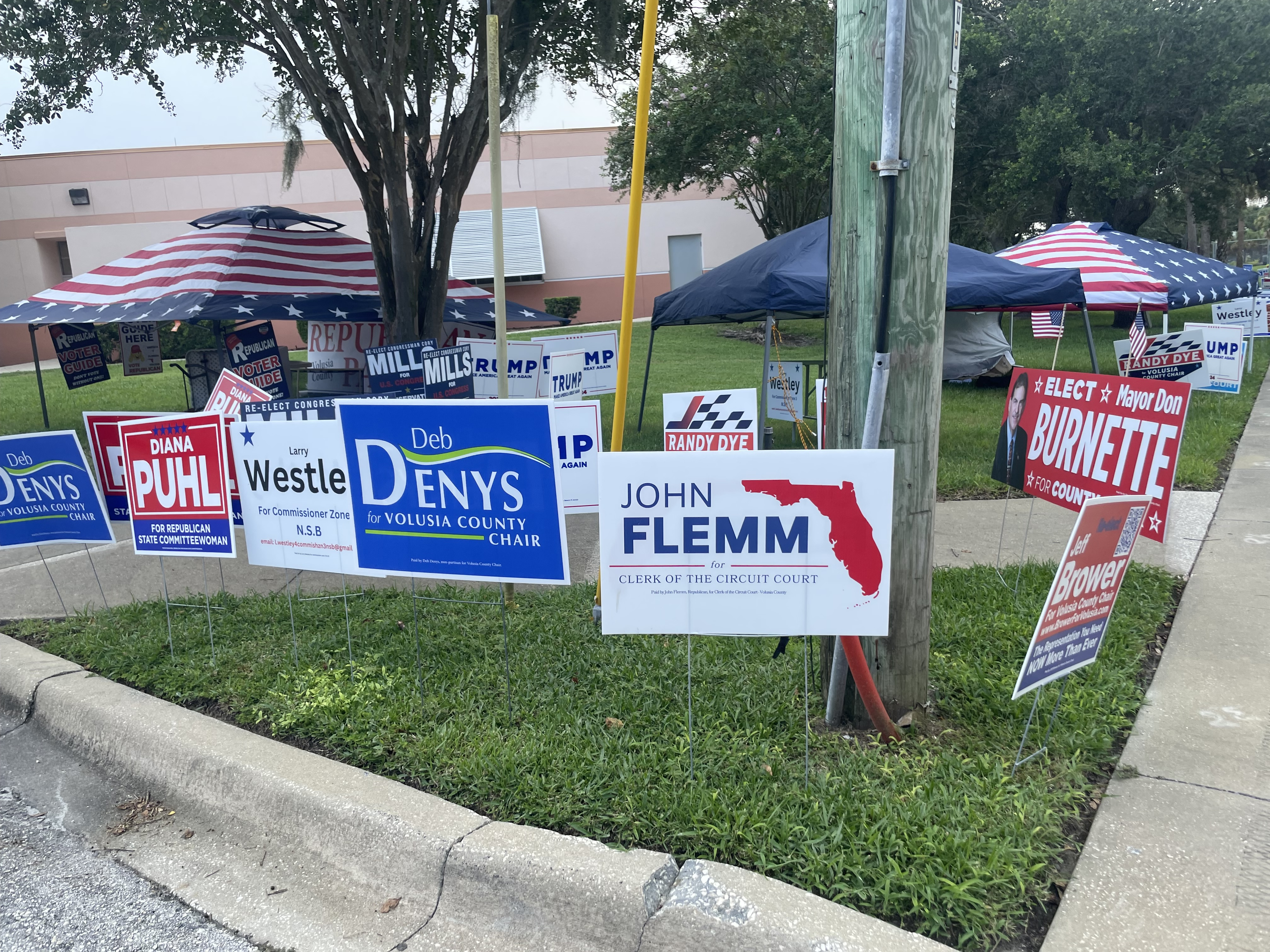
Campaign signs in New Smyrna Beach during the primary election in 2024

== Notable people ==
- Joseph Barbara, actor best known for the soap opera Another World
- Emory L. Bennett, United States Army soldier in the Korean War, Medal of Honor winner
- The Beu Sisters, music recording artists
- Joyce Cusack, Florida politician and retired registered nurse
- Suzanne Kosmas, Former U.S. Representative for Florida's 24th congressional district
- Jimmy McMillan, political activist, perennial candidate, Vietnam War veteran, and founder of the Rent is Too Damn High political party
- Walter M. Miller, Jr., author of A Canticle for Liebowitz
- Cory Mills, U.S. Representative for Florida's 7th congressional district (2023–present)
- Jack Mitchell, photographer and author of dance and iconic artist images
- Preston Pardus, American stock car racing driver
- Jim Parsley, American stock car racing driver
- Vera Tolstoy, Russian-American émigré, broadcaster and granddaughter of novelist Leo Tolstoy
- Jacob Winchester, New York Times Critic's Pick award-winning composer, producer, writer, and director

=== Athletes ===
- Dallas Baker, professional football wide receiver, assistant football coach with Buffalo Bulls
- Perry Baker, professional rugby player with the United States national rugby sevens team
- Laura Brown, former American college and professional golfer
- Wes Chandler, University of Florida alumnus, and professional football player in the NFL
- Eric Geiselman, professional surfer with the world surf league
- Evan Geiselman, professional surfer
- Chris Isaac, former quarterback with the Ottawa Rough Riders of the CFL
- Raheem Mostert, football running back and kickoff returner for the Miami Dolphins in the NFL
- Duffy Waldorf, professional golfer, former member of the PGA Tour who plays on the Champions Tour

== Gallery ==
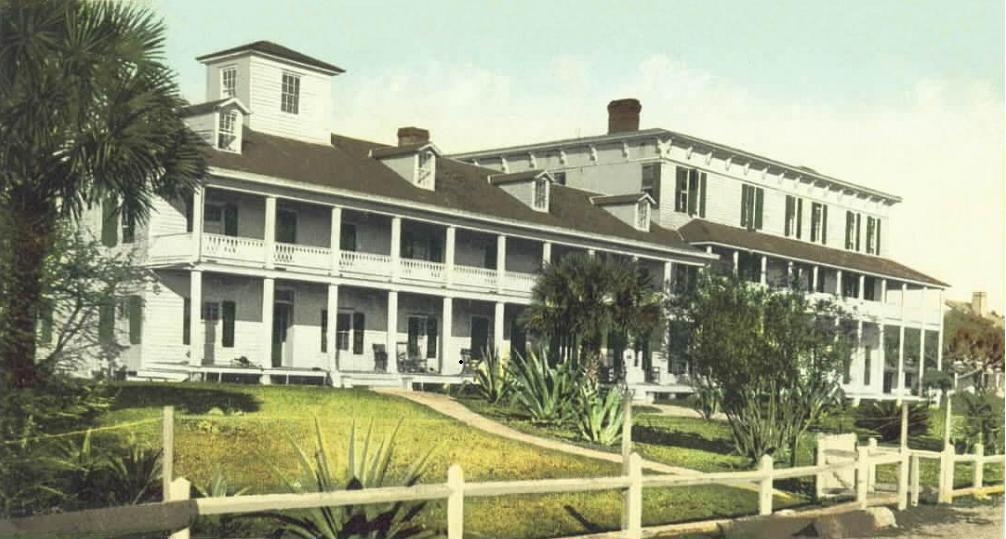
The Ocean House circa 1906

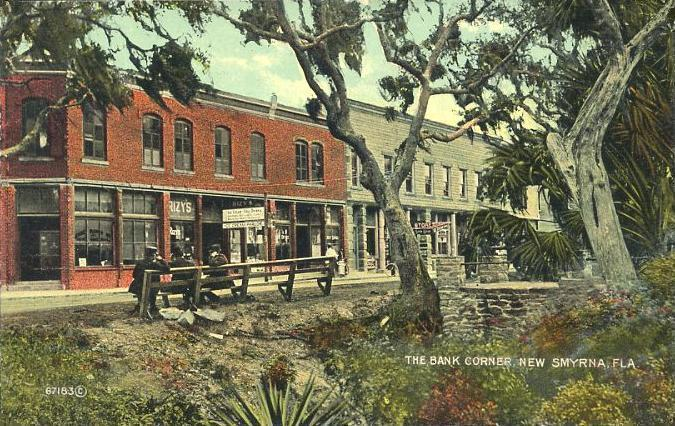
Bank corner in 1914

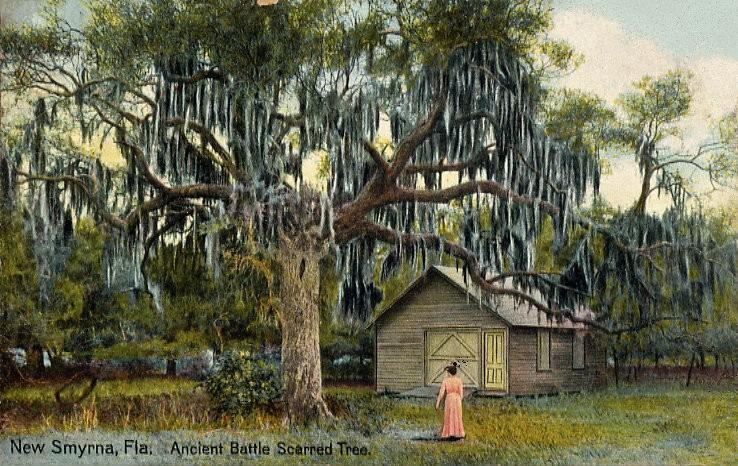
Battle-scarred tree in 1909

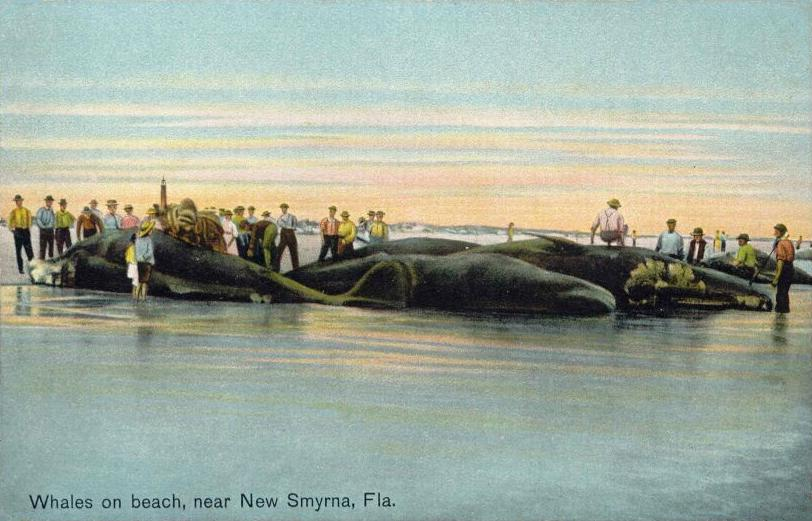
Whales on beach in 1908

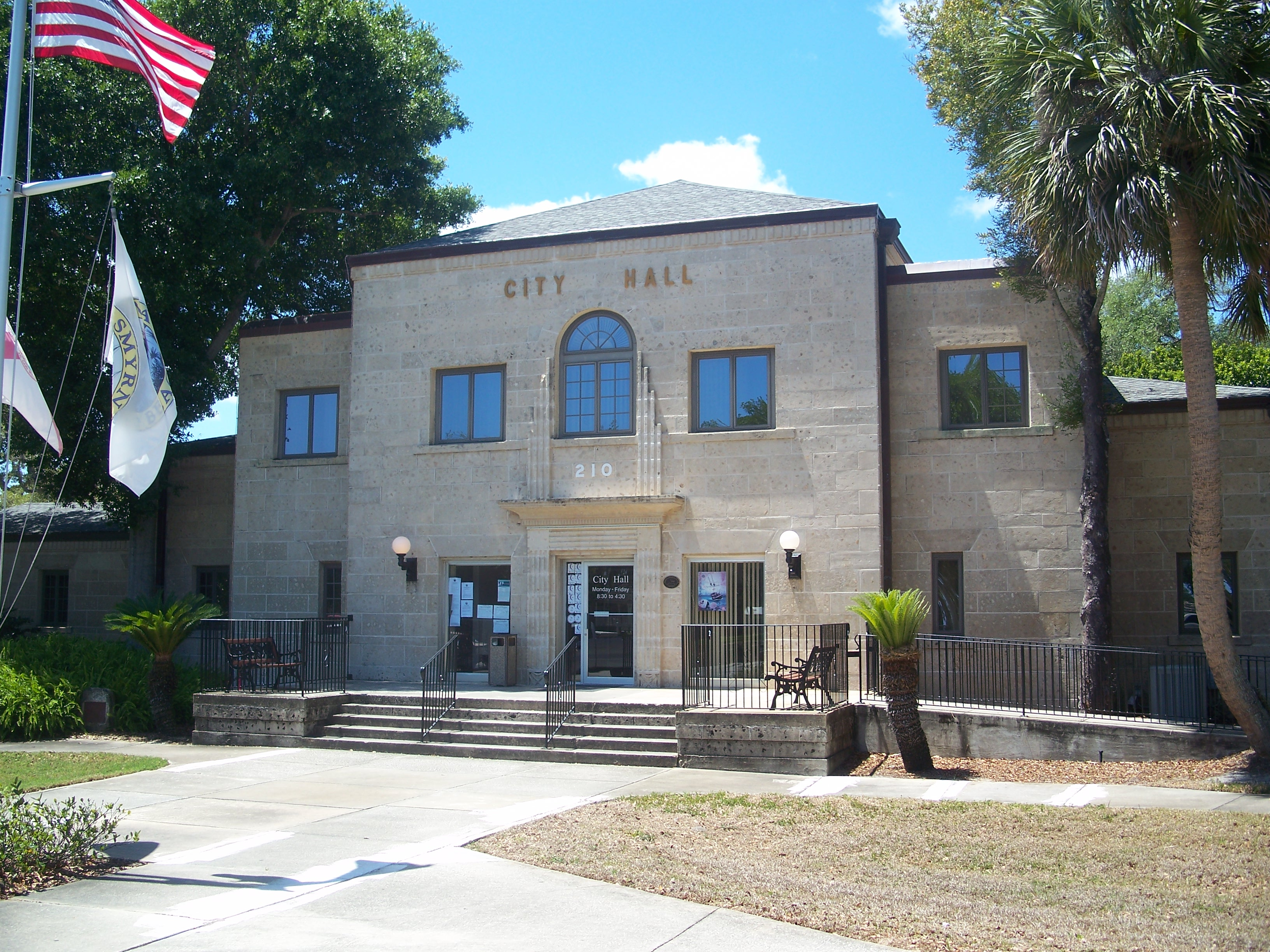
City Hall

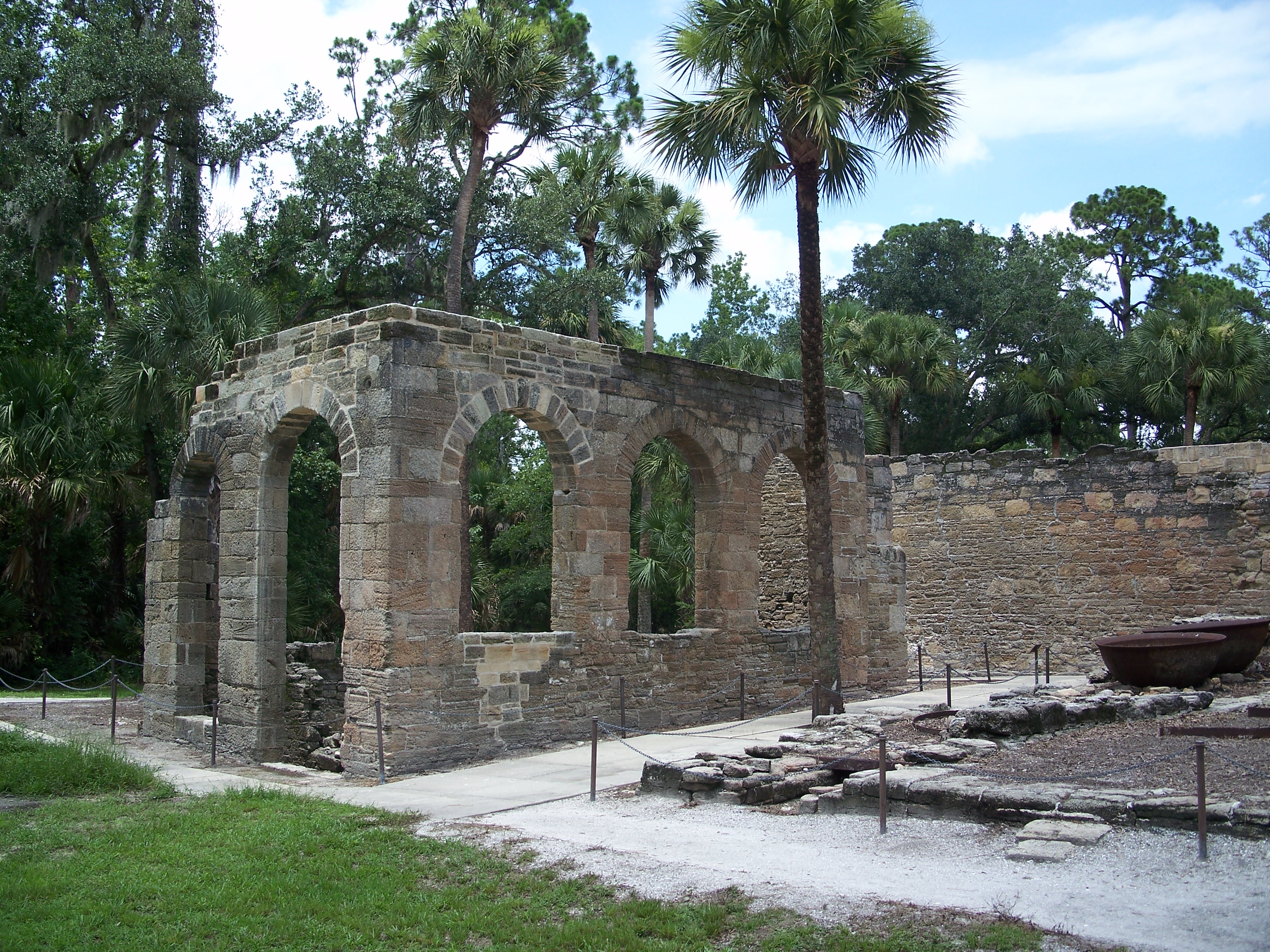
New Smyrna Sugar Mill Ruins

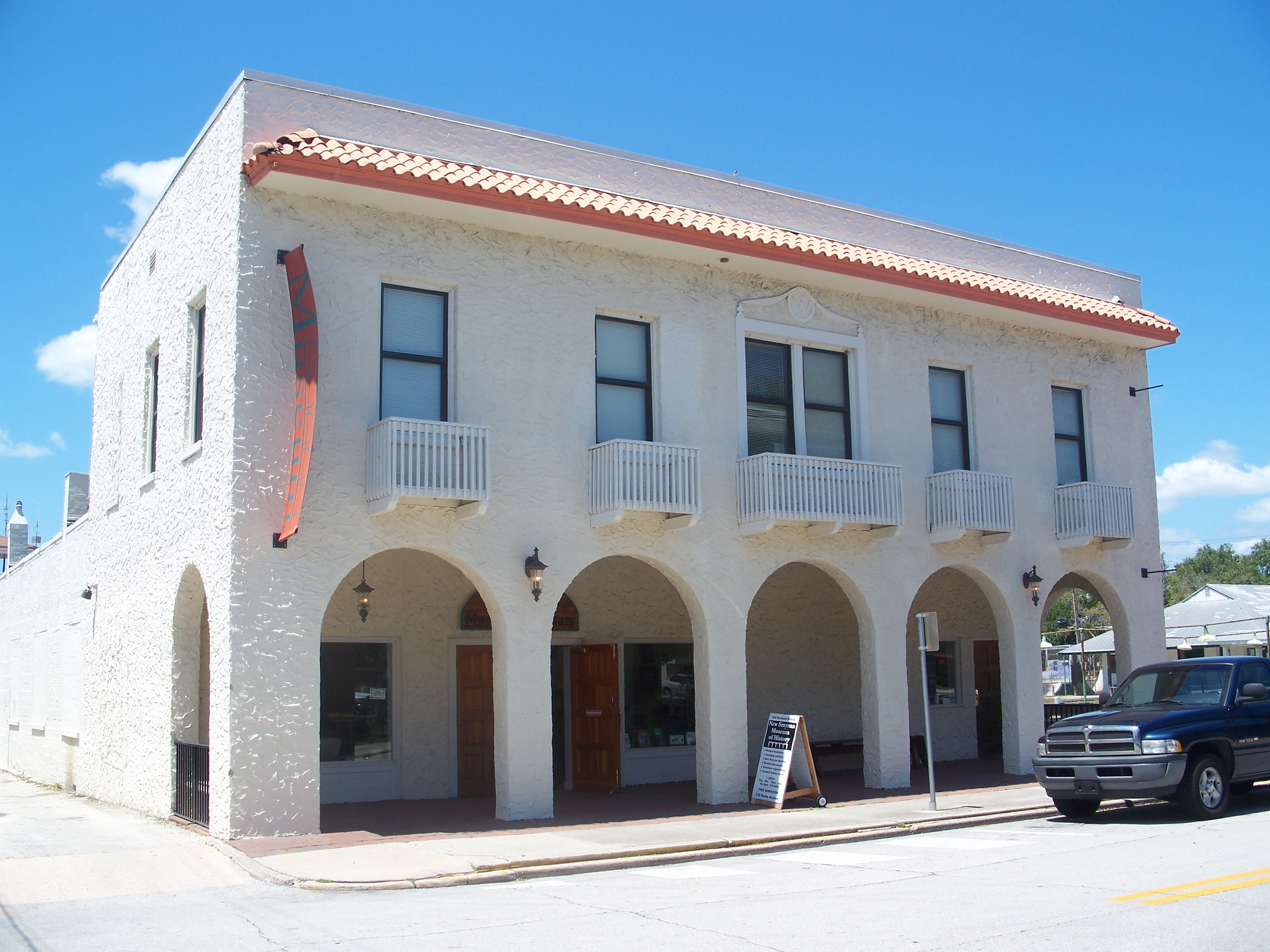
New Smyrna Museum of History

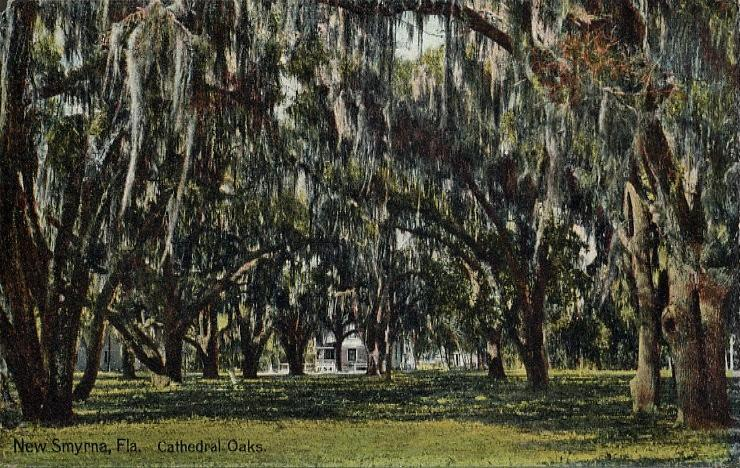
Cathedral oaks in 1909
