= Evan Geiselman =

American surfer

Personal information
- Born: August 31, 1993 (age 33) New Smyrna Beach, Florida, U.S.
- Years active: 2000–present
- Height: 5 ft 11 in (1.80 m)
- Weight: 150 lb (68 kg)

Surfing career
- Sport: Surfing
- Sponsors: Reef, Ron Jon Surf Shop, Smith optics, DaKine, Freefly,

Surfing specifications
- Stance: Goofy
- Quiver: 5’11″ x 18 1/4″ x 2 1/8″ Rookie, 5’11 x 18 3/8 x 2 1/8 Semi Pro
- Favorite waves: Teahupoo, Macaronis

Evan Geiselman (born August 31, 1993, in New Smyrna Beach, Florida) has been a competing surfer since the age of seven. He has won 12 East Coast Championship titles. He is the younger brother of professional surfer Eric Geiselman. He has been trying to be part of the ASP World Championship Tour for three years now, but the Qualification Series are competitive. He didn't get the results he was hoping for on the 2014 WQS. At the beginning of 2014, he moved from San Clemente, California back home, to New Smyrna Beach, Florida.

In March 2008, Geiselman started competing in surf competitions at the NSSA East Coast Nationals at Florida's Sebastian Inlet, leaving with victories in Open Juniors, Open Airshow and Explorer Boys. He also took the highest single-wave score in the Open Juniors division. His other interests besides surfing include hunting and fishing.

He won the US Open Pro Jr. on a stock board.

Geiselman starred in the Luke Bryan music video for the single "Roller Coaster". He was chosen for this role because he was into hunting and surfing, and Luke liked the fact that he was not only a successful surfer but also a country boy. Also starring with him in the video is his current girlfriend.

In December 2015, Geiselman was involved in an accident while surfing the Banzai Pipeline on O'ahu's North Shore and nearly died. He was rescued by bodyboarder Andre Botha and then by lifeguards. He was rushed to a hospital and has since made full recovery.

Events won
Year	Event	Venue	Country
2010	US Open Pro JR.	Huntington beach	United States
2016	Ichinomiya Chiba Open	Ichinomiya	Japan
2016	Vans Pro	Lamberts Bay	South Africa
2017	Ron Jon Vans Pro	Cocoa Beach	United States
2017	Florida Pro	Florida	United States
