= MEO Rip Curl Pro Portugal 2019 =

2019 surfing competition

MEO Rip Curl Pro Portugal 2019 at the Surf
- Venue: Supertubos
- Location: Peniche (POR)
- Dates: 16 to 28 October
- Competitors: 54 from 10 nations
- Total prize money: $607.800 (men's) $420.800 (women's)

Medalists
| gold medal | Italo Ferreira | Brazil |
| gold medal | Caroline Marks | United States |
| silver medal | Jordy Smith | South Africa |
| silver medal | Lakey Peterson | United States |

Champions
- Men: Italo Ferreira
- Women: Caroline Marks

The MEO Rip Curl Pro Portugal 2019 is an event in the 2019 World Surf League Men's and Women's Championship Tour. This year's event marks the return of the women's competition to Peniche after 8 years without it.

Brazilian surfer, Italo Ferreira was the men's winner becoming the first ever back-to-back winner as he won the event in 2018. He also ascended to the top spot of the Men's Championship Tour leaderboard surpassing the previous yellow jersey carrier, the world champion Gabriel Medina.

American surfer, Caroline Marks won the women's event and her second Championship Tour trophy of the year. The 17-year-old surfer defeated world number two, Lakey Peterson in the final.

== Background ==
The 11th edition of the event will be hosted in Peniche, Portugal from 16 to 28 October at the Supertubos beach in Peniche, Leiria, Portugal.

Italo Ferreira, from Brazil, is the defending champion as he won the competition in 2018.

== Format ==
A new competition format was introduced for the 2019 Championship Tour. All 36 surfers take part in the Seeding Round. The top two surfers in each heat advance directly to the Round of 32, while the lowest-placed surfer in each heat enters the Elimination Round. In each of the four heats in the Elimination Round, the top two surfers advance to the Round of 32, while the lowest-placed surfer is eliminated from the competition. From the Round of 32 onwards, the competition follows a single elimination format, with the winner of each head-to-head heat advancing to the next round and the loser being eliminated.

== Competition ==
=== Men's tournament ===
==== Seeding Round ====
Heat 1
| 1 | Willian Cardoso | (Brazil) | 10.60 |
| 2 | Kanoa Igarashi | (Japan) | 8.83 |
| 3 | Ricardo Christie | (Australia) | 5.50 |

Heat 2
| 1 | Griffin Colapinto | (United States) | 10.96 |
| 2 | Kolohe Andino | (United States) | 9.20 |
| 3 | Soli Bailey | (Australia) | 7.74 |

Heat 3
| 1 | Yago Dora | (Brazil) | 13.56 |
| 2 | Italo Ferreira | (Brazil) | 12.37 |
| 3 | Frederico Morais | (Portugal) | 8.37 |

Heat 4
| 1 | Caio Ibelli | (Brazil) | 10.84 |
| 2 | Jordy Smith | (South Africa) | 8.30 |
| 3 | Crosby Colapinto | (United States) | 5.17 |

Heat 5
| 1 | Filipe Toledo | (Brazil) | 11.70 |
| 2 | Vasco Ribeiro | (Portugal) | 9.56 |
| 3 | Ezekiel Lau | (Hawaii) | 9.33 |

Heat 6
| 1 | Gabriel Medina | (Brazil) | 14.67 |
| 2 | Joan Duru | (France) | 8.60 |
| 3 | Miguel Blanco | (Portugal) | 6.80 |

Heat 7
| 1 | Jack Freestone | (Australia) | 10.30 |
| 2 | Jadson André | (Brazil) | 9.53 |
| 3 | Owen Wright | (Australia) | 8.73 |

Heat 8
| 1 | Deivid Silva | (Brazil) | 11.34 |
| 2 | Jérémy Florès | (France) | 9.16 |
| 3 | Leonardo Fioravanti | (Italy) | 6.43 |

Heat 9
| 1 | Julian Wilson | (Australia) | 12.66 |
| 2 | Conner Coffin | (United States) | 10.97 |
| 3 | Jesse Mendes | (Brazil) | 7.33 |

Heat 10
| 1 | Peterson Crisanto | (Brazil) | 11.04 |
| 2 | Adrian Buchan | (Australia) | 8.77 |
| 3 | Seth Moniz | (Hawaii) | 5.47 |

Heat 11
| 1 | Sebastian Zietz | (Hawaii) | 11.50 |
| 2 | Wade Carmichael | (Australia) | 10.13 |
| 3 | Ryan Callinan | (Australia) | 6.76 |

Heat 12
| 1 | Michael Rodrigues | (Brazil) | 12.27 |
| 2 | Kelly Slater | (United States) | 11.00 |
| 3 | Michel Bourez | (France) | 8.06 |

==== Elimination round ====
Heat 1
| 1 | Owen Wright | (Australia) | 10.96 |
| 2 | Miguel Blanco | (Portugal) | 9.87 |
| 3 | Ricardo Christie | (Australia) | 6.60 |

Heat 2
| 1 | Crosby Colapinto | (United States) | 12.10 |
| 2 | Leonardo Fioravanti | (Italy) | 11.47 |
| 3 | Seth Moniz | (Hawaii) | 9.66 |

Heat 3
| 1 | Jesse Mendes | (Brazil) | 15.90 |
| 2 | Frederico Morais | (Portugal) | 12.76 |
| 3 | Ryan Callinan | (Australia) | 11.33 |

Heat 4
| 1 | Soli Bailey | (Australia) | 13.00 |
| 2 | Michel Bourez | (France) | 10.60 |
| 3 | Ezekiel Lau | (Hawaii) | 8.46 |

==== Round of 32 ====
| Heat 1: 1 / Jordy Smith / (South Africa) / 8.57; 2 / Crosby Colapinto / (United States) / 3.17 | Heat 2: 1 / Griffin Colapinto / (United States) / 10.80; 2 / Adrian Buchan / (Australia) / 7.54 | Heat 3: 1 / Kolohe Andino / (United States) / 11.83; 2 / Jadson André / (Brazil) / 8.17 | Heat 4: 1 / Michael Rodrigues / (Brazil) / 9.27; 2 / Deivid Silva / (Brazil) / 7.27 |

| Heat 5: 1 / Filipe Toledo / (Brazil) / 14.60; 2 / Vasco Ribeiro / (Portugal) / 10.10 | Heat 6: 1 / Wade Carmichael / (Australia) / 11.10; 2 / Yago Dora / (Brazil) / 10.60 | Heat 7: 1 / Kanoa Igarashi / (Japan) / 12.30; 2 / Leonardo Fioravanti / (Italy) / 11.86 | Heat 8: 1 / Kelly Slater / (United States) / 15.56; 2 / Sebastian Zietz / (Hawaii) / 1.93 |

| Heat 9: 1 / Gabriel Medina / (Brazil) / 13.67; 2 / Miguel Blanco / (Portugal) / 8.33 | Heat 10: 1 / Caio Ibelli / (Brazil) / 12.97; 2 / Michel Bourez / (France) / 11.57 | Heat 11: 1 / Peterson Crisanto / (Brazil) / 16.54; 2 / Jérémy Florès / (France) / 15.00 | Heat 12: 1 / Jesse Mendes / (Brazil) / 11.20; 2 / Owen Wright / (Australia) / 10.93 |

| Heat 13: 1 / Italo Ferreira / (Brazil) / 16.20; 2 / Frederico Morais / (Portugal) / 10.33 | Heat 14: 1 / Conner Coffin / (United States) / 13.64; 2 / Willian Cardoso / (Brazil) / 9.60 | Heat 15: 1 / Jack Freestone / (Australia) / 15.00; 2 / Joan Duru / (France) / 11.10 | Heat 16: 1 / Soli Bailey / (Australia) / 12.70; 2 / Julian Wilson / (Australia) / 11.43 |

==== Round of 16 ====
| Heat 1: 1 / Jordy Smith / (South Africa) / 10.84; 2 / Griffin Colapinto / (United States) / 3.76 | Heat 2: 1 / Kolohe Andino / (United States) / 14.84; 2 / Michael Rodrigues / (Brazil) / 11.57 | Heat 3: 1 / Filipe Toledo / (Brazil) / 14.60; 2 / Wade Carmichael / (Australia) / 9.27 | Heat 4: 1 / Kanoa Igarashi / (Japan) / 10.53; 2 / Kelly Slater / (United States) / 9.10 |

| Heat 5: 1 / Caio Ibelli / (Brazil) / 8.50; 2 / Gabriel Medina / (Brazil) / 8.17^{[I]} | Heat 6: 1 / Peterson Crisanto / (Brazil) / 14.34; 2 / Jesse Mendes / (Brazil) / 12.46 | Heat 7: 1 / Italo Ferreira / (Brazil) / 13.83; 2 / Conner Coffin / (United States) / 10.83 | Heat 8: 1 / Jack Freestone / (Australia) / 13.83; 2 / Soli Bailey / (Australia) / 12.40 |

==== Quarterfinals ====
| Heat 1: 1 / Jordy Smith / (South Africa) / 13.40; 2 / Kolohe Andino / (United States) / 10.97 | Heat 2: 1 / Kanoa Igarashi / (Japan) / 15.24; 2 / Filipe Toledo / (Brazil) / 12.26 | Heat 3: 1 / Caio Ibelli / (Brazil) / 12.86; 2 / Peterson Crisanto / (Brazil) / 11.83 | Heat 4: 1 / Italo Ferreira / (Brazil) / 18.40; 2 / Jack Freestone / (Australia) / 16.87 |

==== Semifinals ====
| Heat 1: 1 / Jordy Smith / (South Africa) / 15.83; 2 / Kanoa Igarashi / (Japan) / 12.66 | Heat 2: 1 / Italo Ferreira / (Brazil) / 15.43; 2 / Caio Ibelli / (Brazil) / 14.86 |

==== Final ====
Heat 1
| 1 | Italo Ferreira | (Brazil) | 18.43 |
| 2 | Jordy Smith | (South Africa) | 6.17^{[I]} |

=== Women's tournament ===
==== Seeding Round ====
Heat 1
| 1 | Sally Fitzgibbons | (Australia) | 9.94 |
| 2 | Brisa Hennessy | (Costa Rica) | 9.20 |
| 3 | Paige Hareb | (New Zealand) | 7.90 |

Heat 2
| 1 | Macy Callaghan | (Australia) | 12.60 |
| 2 | Nikki Van Dijk | (Australia) | 10.33 |
| 3 | Lakey Peterson | (United States) | 10.26 |

Heat 3
| 1 | Carissa Moore | (Hawaii) | 14.00 |
| 2 | Silvana Lima | (Brazil) | 9.00 |
| 3 | Alana Blanchard | (Hawaii) | 7.37 |

Heat 4
| 1 | Caroline Marks | (United States) | 11.64 |
| 2 | Johanne Defay | (France) | 10.27 |
| 3 | Keely Andrew | (Australia) | 5.10 |

Heat 5
| 1 | Courtney Conlogue | (United States) | 11.90 |
| 2 | Bronte Macaulay | (New Zealand) | 11.10 |
| 3 | Tatiana Weston-Webb | (Brazil) | 11.07 |

Heat 6
| 1 | Coco Ho | (Hawaii) | 8.36 |
| 2 | Stephanie Gilmore | (New Zealand) | 7.50 |
| 3 | Malia Manuel | (Hawaii) | 7.03 |

==== Elimination round ====
Heat 1
| 1 | Lakey Peterson | (United States) | 12.67 |
| 2 | Keely Andrew | (Australia) | 6.33 |
| 3 | Alana Blanchard | (Hawaii) | 5.34 |

Heat 2
| – | Tatiana Weston-Webb | (Brazil) | – |
| – | Paige Hareb | (New Zealand) | – |
| 3 | Malia Manuel | (Hawaii) | INJ |

==== Round of 16 ====
| Heat 1: 1 / Caroline Marks / (United States) / 12.67; 2 / Bronte Macaulay / (New Zealand) / 9.83 | Heat 2: 1 / Stephanie Gilmore / (New Zealand) / 13.07; 2 / Macy Callaghan / (Australia) / 12.13 | Heat 3: 1 / Sally Fitzgibbons / (Australia) / 12.67; 2 / Keely Andrew / (Australia) / 9.50 | Heat 4: 1 / Tatiana Weston-Webb / (Brazil) / 14.67; 2 / Coco Ho / (Hawaii) / 10.60 |

| Heat 5: 1 / Carissa Moore / (Hawaii) / 13.20; 2 / Paige Hareb / (New Zealand) / 11.00 | Heat 6: 1 / Johanne Defay / (France) / 10.66; 2 / Brisa Hennessy / (Costa Rica) / 9.54 | Heat 7: 1 / Lakey Peterson / (United States) / 13.43; 2 / Silvana Lima / (Brazil) / 8.54 | Heat 8: 1 / Nikki Van Dijk / (Australia) / 12.40; 2 / Courtney Conlogue / (United States) / 12.34 |

==== Quarterfinals ====
| Heat 1: 1 / Caroline Marks / (United States) / 15.17; 2 / Stephanie Gilmore / (New Zealand) / 12.07 | Heat 2: 1 / Tatiana Weston-Webb / (Brazil) / 13.67; 2 / Sally Fitzgibbons / (Australia) / 9.14 | Heat 3: 1 / Carissa Moore / (Hawaii) / 16.06; 2 / Johanne Defay / (France) / 7.50 | Heat 4: 1 / Lakey Peterson / (United States) / 11.33; 2 / Nikki Van Dijk / (Australia) / 8.83 |

==== Semifinals ====
| Heat 1: 1 / Caroline Marks / (United States) / 13.16; 2 / Tatiana Weston-Webb / (Brazil) / 7.70 | Heat 2: 1 / Lakey Peterson / (United States) / 13.23; 2 / Carissa Moore / (Hawaii) / 11.50 |

==== Final ====
Heat 1
| 1 | Caroline Marks | (United States) | 13.73 |
| 2 | Lakey Peterson | (United States) | 6.27 |
