= Margaret River Pro 2019 =

Margaret River Pro
- Location: Margaret River, Western Australia, Australia
- Dates: 29 May to 4 June 2019
- Competitors: 36 from 10 nations

Medalists
gold medal	John John Florence	Hawaii
silver medal	Kolohe Andino	United States

The Margaret River Pro 2019 was the fourth event of the Men's Championship Tour in the 2019 World Surf League. It took place from 29 May to 4 June in Margaret River, Western Australia, and was contested by 36 surfers.

In the final, Hawaii's John John Florence defeated American Kolohe Andino to win the seventh Championship Tour event of his career.

== Format ==
A new competition format was introduced for the 2019 Championship Tour. All 36 surfers take part in the Seeding Round. The top two surfers in each heat advance directly to the Round of 32, while the lowest-placed surfer in each heat enters the Elimination Round. In each of the four heats in the Elimination Round, the top two surfers advance to the Round of 32, while the lowest-placed surfer is eliminated from the competition. From the Round of 32 onwards, the competition follows a single elimination format, with the winner of each head-to-head heat advancing to the next round and the loser being eliminated.

== Competition ==
=== Bracket ===
Round of 16
(Brazil) Italo Ferreira	13.74
(France) Michel Bourez	12.14
(Hawaii) John John Florence	13.67
(Hawaii) Sebastian Zietz	12.40
(Brazil) Caio Ibelli	14.50
(United States) Kelly Slater	10.26
(South Africa) Jordy Smith	14.16
(United States) Conner Coffin	10.77
(Hawaii) Seth Moniz	14.20
(Australia) Jack Robinson	9.97
(Australia) Owen Wright	12.73
(United States) Kolohe Andino	15.26
(Brazil) Peterson Crisanto	11.70
(Australia) Julian Wilson	16.27
(Australia) Ryan Callinan	14.57
(Japan) Kanoa Igarashi	14.07

Quarter finals
(Brazil) Italo Ferreira	15.36
(Hawaii) John John Florence	17.73
(Brazil) Caio Ibelli	15.26
(South Africa) Jordy Smith	15.24
(Hawaii) Seth Moniz	13.34
(United States) Kolohe Andino	13.90
(Australia) Julian Wilson	13.40
(Australia) Ryan Callinan	11.60

Semi finals
(Hawaii) John John Florence	14.60
(Brazil) Caio Ibelli	14.10
(United States) Kolohe Andino	10.83
(Australia) Julian Wilson	9.00

Final
(Hawaii) John John Florence	18.50
(United States) Kolohe Andino	15.10

The competition took place from 29 May to 4 June.

=== Seeding Round ===
Heat 1
1	John Florence	(Hawaii)	12.84
2	Jadson André	(Brazil)	11.64
3	Kelly Slater	(United States)	10.34

Heat 2
1	Kanoa Igarashi	(Japan)	12.73
2	Soli Bailey	(Australia)	11.80
3	Yago Dora	(Brazil)	9.33

Heat 3
1	Peterson Crisanto	(Brazil)	10.56
2	Julian Wilson	(Australia)	10.27
3	Caio Ibelli	(Brazil)	10.17

Heat 4
1	Italo Ferreira	(Brazil)	14.03
2	Joan Duru	(France)	12.84
3	Frederico Morais	(Portugal)	11.90

Heat 5
1	Gabriel Medina	(Brazil)	14.70
2	Deivid Silva	(Brazil)	11.94
3	Jacob Willcox	(Australia)	11.60

Heat 6
1	Filipe Toledo	(Brazil)	14.73
2	Sebastian Zietz	(Hawaii)	12.00
3	Jack Robinson	(Australia)	-

Heat 7
1	Jordy Smith	(South Africa)	14.77
2	Ricardo Christie	(New Zealand)	9.14
3	Adrian Buchan	(Australia)	8.93

Heat 8
1	Kolohe Andino	(United States)	11.70
2	Seth Moniz	(Hawaii)	11.23
3	Jack Freestone	(Australia)	10.73

Heat 9
1	Ryan Callinan	(Australia)	11.57
2	Conner Coffin	(United States)	9.77
3	L. Fioravanti	(Italy)	9.57

Heat 10
1	Ezekiel Lau	(Hawaii)	13.53
2	M. Rodrigues	(Brazil)	12.67
3	Wade Carmichael	(Australia)	11.50

Heat 11
1	Jesse Mendes	(Brazil)	14.60
2	Jérémy Florès	(France)	13.34
3	Willian Cardoso	(Brazil)	9.70

Heat 12
1	Owen Wright	(Australia)	12.10
2	Griffin Colapinto	(United States)	12.00
3	Michel Bourez	(France)	5.33

=== Elimination round ===
Heat 1
1	Jack Robinson	(Australia)	12.60
2	Jack Freestone	(Australia)	10.83
3	Wade Carmichael	(Australia)	10.67

Heat 2
1	L. Fioravanti	(Italy)	15.34
2	Michel Bourez	(France)	13.00
3	Jacob Willcox	(Australia)	11.23

Heat 3
1	Yago Dora	(Brazil)	14.66
2	Willian Cardoso	(Brazil)	13.77
3	Frederico Morais	(Portugal)	13.46

Heat 4
1	Kelly Slater	(United States)	16.50
2	Caio Ibelli	(Brazil)	14.40
3	Adrian Buchan	(Australia)	13.93

=== Round of 32 ===
Heat 1: 1 / Italo Ferreira / (Brazil) / 15.00; 2 / Soli Bailey / (Australia) / 3.50	Heat 2: 1 / Michel Bourez / (France) / 12.17; 2 / Yago Dora / (Brazil) / 4.27	Heat 3: 1 / John Florence / (Hawaii) / 11.83; 2 / Jack Freestone / (Australia) / 9.16	Heat 4: 1 / Sebastian Zietz / (Hawaii) / 13.87; 2 / Jérémy Florès / (France) / 4.93

Heat 5: 1 / Caio Ibelli / (Brazil) / 13.67; 2 / Gabriel Medina / (Brazil) / 13.23	Heat 6: 1 / Kelly Slater / (United States) / 10.06; 2 / Willian Cardoso / (Brazil) / 7.34	Heat 7: 1 / Jordy Smith / (South Africa) / w/o; 2 / L. Fioravanti / (Italy) / w/d	Heat 8: 1 / Conner Coffin / (United States) / 12.33; 2 / Jesse Mendes / (Brazil) / 9.20

Heat 9: 1 / Jack Robinson / (Australia) / 18.57; 2 / Filipe Toledo / (Brazil) / 6.73	Heat 10: 1 / Seth Moniz / (Hawaii) / 12.77; 2 / M. Rodrigues / (Brazil) / 2.14	Heat 11: 1 / Owen Wright / (Australia) / 15.40; 2 / Ezekiel Lau / (Hawaii) / 5.50	Heat 12: 1 / Kolohe Andino / (United States) / 13.20; 2 / Griffin Colapinto / (United States) / 12.00

Heat 13: 1 / Julian Wilson / (Australia) / 7.47; 2 / Jadson André / (Brazil) / 4.30	Heat 14: 1 / Peterson Crisanto / (Brazil) / 14.23; 2 / Joan Duru / (France) / 14.10	Heat 15: 1 / Ryan Callinan / (Australia) / 10.83; 2 / Deivid Silva / (Brazil) / 7.63	Heat 16: 1 / Kanoa Igarashi / (Japan) / 14.83; 2 / Ricardo Christie / (New Zealand) / 11.10

=== Round of 16 ===
Heat 1: 1 / Italo Ferreira / (Brazil) / 13.74; 2 / Michel Bourez / (France) / 12.14	Heat 2: 1 / John Florence / (Hawaii) / 13.67; 2 / Sebastian Zietz / (Hawaii) / 12.40	Heat 3: 1 / Caio Ibelli / (Brazil) / 14.50; 2 / Kelly Slater / (United States) / 10.26	Heat 4: 1 / Jordy Smith / (South Africa) / 14.16; 2 / Conner Coffin / (United States) / 10.77

Heat 5: 1 / Seth Moniz / (Hawaii) / 14.20; 2 / Jack Robinson / (Australia) / 9.97	Heat 6: 1 / Kolohe Andino / (United States) / 15.26; 2 / Owen Wright / (Australia) / 12.73	Heat 7: 1 / Julian Wilson / (Australia) / 16.27; 2 / Peterson Crisanto / (Brazil) / 11.70	Heat 8: 1 / Ryan Callinan / (Australia) / 14.57; 2 / Kanoa Igarashi / (Japan) / 14.07

=== Quarterfinals ===
Heat 1: 1 / John Florence / (Hawaii) / 17.73; 2 / Italo Ferreira / (Brazil) / 15.36	Heat 2: 1 / Caio Ibelli / (Brazil) / 15.26; 2 / Jordy Smith / (South Africa) / 15.24	Heat 3: 1 / Kolohe Andino / (United States) / 13.90; 2 / Seth Moniz / (Hawaii) / 13.34	Heat 4: 1 / Julian Wilson / (Australia) / 13.40; 2 / Ryan Callinan / (Australia) / 11.60

=== Semifinals ===
Heat 1: 1 / John Florence / (Hawaii) / 14.60; 2 / Caio Ibelli / (Brazil) / 14.10	Heat 2: 1 / Kolohe Andino / (United States) / 10.83; 2 / Julian Wilson / (Australia) / 9.00

=== Final ===
Heat 1
1	John Florence	(Hawaii)	18.50
2	Kolohe Andino	(United States)	15.10
