= Rip Curl Pro Bells Beach 2019 =

Rip Curl Pro Bells Beach
- Location: Bells Beach, Victoria, Australia
- Dates: 17 to 27 April 2019
- Competitors: 36 from 9 nations

Medalists
gold medal	John John Florence	Hawaii
silver medal	Filipe Toledo	Brazil

The Rip Curl Pro Bells Beach 2019 was the second event of the Men's Championship Tour in the 2019 World Surf League. It took place from 17 to 27 April in Bells Beach, Victoria, and was contested by 36 surfers.

In the final, John John Florence of Hawaii defeated Brazil's Filipe Toledo to win his sixth Championship Tour event, and his first at Bells Beach.

== Format ==
A new competition format was introduced for the 2019 Championship Tour. All 36 surfers take part in the Seeding Round. The top two surfers in each heat advance directly to the Round of 32, while the lowest-placed surfer in each heat enters the Elimination Round. In each of the four heats in the Elimination Round, the top two surfers advance to the Round of 32, while the lowest-placed surfer is eliminated from the competition. From the Round of 32 onwards, the competition follows a single elimination format, with the winner of each head-to-head heat advancing to the next round and the loser being eliminated.

== Competition ==
The competition took place from 17 to 27 April.

=== Seeding Round ===
Heat 1
1	Jadson André	(Brazil)	12.23
2	Jérémy Florès	(France)	9.97
3	Owen Wright	(Australia)	8.20

Heat 2
1	Jordy Smith	(South Africa)	10.26
2	Adrian Buchan	(Australia)	8.07
3	Jack Freestone	(Australia)	7.84

Heat 3
1	Filipe Toledo	(Brazil)	15.87
2	Kelly Slater	(United States)	10.63
3	Xavier Huxtable	(Australia)	10.23

Heat 4
1	Ezekiel Lau	(Hawaii)	10.57
2	Italo Ferreira	(Brazil)	10.06
3	Caio Ibelli	(Brazil)	9.73

Heat 5
1	Jacob Willcox	(Australia)	13.74
2	Julian Wilson	(Australia)	13.73
3	Joan Duru	(France)	11.00

Heat 6
1	Gabriel Medina	(Brazil)	13.70
2	Ryan Callinan	(Australia)	13.00
3	Harrison Mann	(Australia)	7.87

Heat 7
1	Conner Coffin	(United States)	10.77
2	L. Fioravanti	(Italy)	10.60
3	M. Rodrigues	(Brazil)	9.56

Heat 8
1	Kolohe Andino	(United States)	10.77
2	Seth Moniz	(Hawaii)	8.67
3	Soli Bailey	(Australia)	8.37

Heat 9
1	Ricardo Christie	(New Zealand)	11.83
2	Yago Dora	(Brazil)	10.10
3	Wade Carmichael	(Australia)	8.04

Heat 10
1	Deivid Silva	(Brazil)	10.67
2	Michel Bourez	(France)	10.60
3	Reef Heazlewood	(Australia)	10.34

Heat 11
1	John Florence	(Hawaii)	13.00
2	Willian Cardoso	(Brazil)	7.67
3	Jesse Mendes	(Brazil)	7.53

Heat 12
1	Peterson Crisanto	(Brazil)	10.87
2	Kanoa Igarashi	(Japan)	10.46
3	Mikey Wright	(Australia)	9.33

=== Elimination round ===
Heat 1
1	Owen Wright	(Australia)	11.30
2	Jack Freestone	(Australia)	10.80
3	Harrison Mann	(Australia)	8.37

Heat 2
1	Soli Bailey	(Australia)	13.03
2	Wade Carmichael	(Australia)	11.74
3	Xavier Huxtable	(Australia)	11.40

Heat 3
1	Reef Heazlewood	(Australia)	12.67
2	Mikey Wright	(Australia)	11.50
3	Jesse Mendes	(Brazil)	11.46

Heat 4
1	M. Rodrigues	(Brazil)	12.83
2	Caio Ibelli	(Brazil)	11.07
3	Joan Duru	(France)	7.64

=== Round of 32 ===
Heat 1: 1 / Kelly Slater / (United States) / 11.84; 2 / Julian Wilson / (Australia) / 7.20	Heat 2: 1 / Peterson Crisanto / (Brazil) / 11.97; 2 / M. Rodrigues / (Brazil) / 11.67	Heat 3: 1 / Conner Coffin / (United States) / 13.43; 2 / Soli Bailey / (Australia) / 11.83	Heat 4: 1 / Ryan Callinan / (Australia) / 12.50; 2 / Michel Bourez / (France) / 10.76

Heat 5: 1 / Filipe Toledo / (Brazil) / 14.50; 2 / Caio Ibelli / (Brazil) / 13.07	Heat 6: 1 / Seth Moniz / (Hawaii) / 14.00; 2 / Mikey Wright / (Australia) / 8.50	Heat 7: 1 / Jacob Willcox / (Australia) / 13.24; 2 / Kolohe Andino / (United States) / 12.20	Heat 8: 1 / Deivid Silva / (Brazil) / 13.17; 2 / Wade Carmichael / (Australia) / 11.87

Heat 9: 1 / Gabriel Medina / (Brazil) / 16.03; 2 / Reef Heazlewood / (Australia) / 7.80	Heat 10: 1 / Willian Cardoso / (Brazil) / 12.20; 2 / Yago Dora / (Brazil) / 9.63	Heat 11: 1 / Owen Wright / (Australia) / 16.10; 2 / Ricardo Christie / (New Zealand) / 12.07	Heat 12: 1 / John Florence / (Hawaii) / 17.67; 2 / Jadson André / (Brazil) / 11.24

Heat 13: 1 / Italo Ferreira / (Brazil) / 13.76; 2 / Jack Freestone / (Australia) / 9.10	Heat 14: 1 / Jérémy Florès / (France) / 14.03; 2 / Ezekiel Lau / (Hawaii) / 13.44	Heat 15: 1 / Kanoa Igarashi / (Japan) / 12.07; 2 / Adrian Buchan / (Australia) / 11.93	Heat 16: 1 / Jordy Smith / (South Africa) / 14.10; 2 / L. Fioravanti / (Italy) / 13.27

=== Round of 16 ===
Heat 1: 1 / Kelly Slater / (United States) / 10.80; 2 / Peterson Crisanto / (Brazil) / 6.87	Heat 2: 1 / Ryan Callinan / (Australia) / 13.93; 2 / Conner Coffin / (United States) / 9.93	Heat 3: 1 / Filipe Toledo / (Brazil) / 14.10; 2 / Seth Moniz / (Hawaii) / 7.13	Heat 4: 1 / Jacob Willcox / (Australia) / 11.80; 2 / Deivid Silva / (Brazil) / 10.04

Heat 5: 1 / Gabriel Medina / (Brazil) / 17.27; 2 / Willian Cardoso / (Brazil) / 7.76	Heat 6: 1 / John Florence / (Hawaii) / 18.16; 2 / Owen Wright / (Australia) / 16.97	Heat 7: 1 / Italo Ferreira / (Brazil) / 12.20; 2 / Jérémy Florès / (France) / 6.03	Heat 8: 1 / Jordy Smith / (South Africa) / 13.10; 2 / Kanoa Igarashi / (Japan) / 11.03

=== Quarterfinals ===
Heat 1: 1 / Ryan Callinan / (Australia) / 12.67; 2 / Kelly Slater / (United States) / 5.67	Heat 2: 1 / Filipe Toledo / (Brazil) / 14.17; 2 / Jacob Willcox / (Australia) / 13.06	Heat 3: 1 / John Florence / (Hawaii) / 16.87; 2 / Gabriel Medina / (Brazil) / 15.17	Heat 4: 1 / Jordy Smith / (South Africa) / 15.23; 2 / Italo Ferreira / (Brazil) / 8.40

=== Semifinals ===
Heat 1: 1 / Filipe Toledo / (Brazil) / 13.40; 2 / Ryan Callinan / (Australia) / 12.84	Heat 2: 1 / John Florence / (Hawaii) / 16.80; 2 / Jordy Smith / (South Africa) / 15.24

=== Final ===
Heat 1
1	John Florence	(Hawaii)	14.30
2	Filipe Toledo	(Brazil)	13.83
