= Corona Bali Protected 2019 =

Corona Bali Protected
- Location: Keramas, Bali, Indonesia
- Dates: 13 to 25 May 2019
- Competitors: 36 from 10 nations

Medalists
gold medal	Kanoa Igarashi	Japan
silver medal	Jérémy Florès	France

The Corona Bali Protected 2019 was the third event of the Men's Championship Tour in the 2019 World Surf League. It took place from 13 to 25 May in Keramas, Bali, and was contested by 36 surfers.

In the final, Japan's Kanoa Igarashi defeated Jérémy Florès of France to win his first World Surf League event.

== Name ==
When the event was added to the World Surf League calendar in 2018, it was originally to be known as the "Corona Bali Pro", but sponsor Corona renamed the event the "Corona Bali Protected" as part of a campaign to raise awareness of marine plastic pollution.

== Format ==
A new competition format was introduced for the 2019 Championship Tour. All 36 surfers take part in the Seeding Round. The top two surfers in each heat advance directly to the Round of 32, while the lowest-placed surfer in each heat enters the Elimination Round. In each of the four heats in the Elimination Round, the top two surfers advance to the Round of 32, while the lowest-placed surfer is eliminated from the competition. From the Round of 32 onwards, the competition follows a single elimination format, with the winner of each head-to-head heat advancing to the next round and the loser being eliminated.

== Competition ==
The event took place from 13 to 25 May.

=== Seeding Round ===
Heat 1
1	John Florence	(Hawaii)	11.50
2	M. Rodrigues	(Brazil)	10.16
3	L. Fioravanti	(Italy)	7.47

Heat 2
1	Jordy Smith	(South Africa)	14.00
2	Jadson André	(Brazil)	10.44
3	Sebastian Zietz	(Hawaii)	9.04

Heat 3
1	Julian Wilson	(Australia)	10.90
2	Jack Freestone	(Australia)	8.60
3	Adrian Buchan	(Australia)	7.74

Heat 4
1	Italo Ferreira	(Brazil)	11.50
2	Caio Ibelli	(Brazil)	8.97
3	Ezekiel Lau	(Hawaii)	7.80

Heat 5
1	Filipe Toledo	(Brazil)	16.17
2	Peterson Crisanto	(Brazil)	10.40
3	Jacob Willcox	(Australia)	7.60

Heat 6
1	Rio Waida	(Indonesia)	9.60
2	Gabriel Medina	(Brazil)	9.54
3	Deivid Silva	(Brazil)	6.77

Heat 7
1	Yago Dora	(Brazil)	11.63
2	Owen Wright	(Australia)	10.33
3	Soli Bailey	(Australia)	9.50

Heat 8
1	Conner Coffin	(United States)	11.24
2	Jérémy Florès	(France)	10.00
3	Jesse Mendes	(Brazil)	8.17

Heat 9
1	Kelly Slater	(United States)	11.66
2	Kolohe Andino	(United States)	11.23
3	Ryan Callinan	(Australia)	10.67

Heat 10
1	Ricardo Christie	(New Zealand)	11.93
2	Wade Carmichael	(Australia)	8.63
3	Seth Moniz	(Hawaii)	5.10

Heat 11
1	Mikey Wright	(Australia)	12.00
2	Joan Duru	(France)	9.50
3	Kanoa Igarashi	(Japan)	1.77

Heat 12
1	Michel Bourez	(France)	12.43
2	Griffin Colapinto	(United States)	9.63
3	Willian Cardoso	(Brazil)	8.73

=== Elimination round ===
Heat 1
1	Kanoa Igarashi	(Japan)	14.60
2	Deivid Silva	(Brazil)	10.67
3	Jacob Willcox	(Australia)	10.10

Heat 2
1	L. Fioravanti	(Italy)	10.90
2	Willian Cardoso	(Brazil)	10.66
3	Ezekiel Lau	(Hawaii)	10.07

Heat 3
1	Adrian Buchan	(Australia)	14.00
2	Seth Moniz	(Hawaii)	12.50
3	Soli Bailey	(Australia)	11.40

Heat 4
1	Ryan Callinan	(Australia)	10.50
2	Jesse Mendes	(Brazil)	8.43
3	Sebastian Zietz	(Hawaii)	8.40

=== Round of 32 ===
Heat 1: 1 / Julian Wilson / (Australia) / 12.23; 2 / Jadson André / (Brazil) / 8.00	Heat 2: 1 / M. Rodrigues / (Brazil) / 12.27; 2 / Yago Dora / (Brazil) / 3.57	Heat 3: 1 / Joan Duru / (France) / 12.14; 2 / John Florence / (Hawaii) / 12.04	Heat 4: 1 / Wade Carmichael / (Australia) / 11.63; 2 / Deivid Silva / (Brazil) / 11.44

Heat 5: 1 / Jack Freestone / (Australia) / 11.26; 2 / Italo Ferreira / (Brazil) / 4.77	Heat 6: 1 / Jérémy Florès / (France) / 13.74; 2 / Willian Cardoso / (Brazil) / 11.34	Heat 7: 1 / Conner Coffin / (United States) / 10.33; 2 / Griffin Colapinto / (United States) / 7.33	Heat 8: 1 / Kolohe Andino / (United States) / 14.54; 2 / Ricardo Christie / (New Zealand) / 8.37

Heat 9: 1 / Filipe Toledo / (Brazil) / 13.00; 2 / Caio Ibelli / (Brazil) / 7.13	Heat 10: 1 / Ryan Callinan / (Australia) / 11.76; 2 / Seth Moniz / (Hawaii) / 9.50	Heat 11: 1 / Kelly Slater / (United States) / 12.50; 2 / Owen Wright / (Australia) / 8.30	Heat 12: 1 / Michel Bourez / (France) / 9.13; 2 / Rio Waida / (Indonesia) / 8.10

Heat 13: 1 / L. Fioravanti / (Italy) / 12.73; 2 / Gabriel Medina / (Brazil) / 11.00	Heat 14: 1 / Adrian Buchan / (Australia) / 8.73; 2 / Mikey Wright / (Australia) / 6.50	Heat 15: 1 / Kanoa Igarashi / (Japan) / 13.90; 2 / Peterson Crisanto / (Brazil) / 7.60	Heat 16: 1 / Jesse Mendes / (Brazil) / 11.20; 2 / Jordy Smith / (South Africa) / 10.33

=== Round of 16 ===
Heat 1: 1 / M. Rodrigues / (Brazil) / 13.67; 2 / Julian Wilson / (Australia) / 6.77	Heat 2: 1 / Wade Carmichael / (Australia) / 15.50; 2 / Joan Duru / (France) / 13.87	Heat 3: 1 / Jérémy Florès / (France) / 14.17; 2 / Jack Freestone / (Australia) / 13.00	Heat 4: 1 / Kolohe Andino / (United States) / 11.16; 2 / Conner Coffin / (United States) / 9.67

Heat 5: 1 / Filipe Toledo / (Brazil) / 15.93; 2 / Ryan Callinan / (Australia) / 13.47	Heat 6: 1 / Kelly Slater / (United States) / 14.46; 2 / Michel Bourez / (France) / 14.27	Heat 7: 1 / Adrian Buchan / (Australia) / 11.23; 2 / L. Fioravanti / (Italy) / 10.80	Heat 8: 1 / Kanoa Igarashi / (Japan) / 15.66; 2 / Jesse Mendes / (Brazil) / 5.86

=== Quarterfinals ===
Heat 1: 1 / M. Rodrigues / (Brazil) / 10.20; 2 / Wade Carmichael / (Australia) / 9.93	Heat 2: 1 / Jérémy Florès / (France) / 10.47; 2 / Kolohe Andino / (United States) / 10.00	Heat 3: 1 / Kelly Slater / (United States) / 12.30; 2 / Filipe Toledo / (Brazil) / 10.53	Heat 4: 1 / Kanoa Igarashi / (Japan) / 11.17; 2 / Adrian Buchan / (Australia) / 10.10

=== Semifinals ===
Heat 1: 1 / Jérémy Florès / (France) / 16.43; 2 / M. Rodrigues / (Brazil) / 12.00	Heat 2: 1 / Kanoa Igarashi / (Japan) / 15.07; 2 / Kelly Slater / (United States) / 13.84

=== Final ===
Heat 1
1	Kanoa Igarashi	(Japan)	15.10
2	Jérémy Florès	(France)	14.63
