= Tahiti Pro Teahupo'o 2019 =

Tahiti Pro Teahupo'o
- Location: Teahupo'o, Tahiti, French Polynesia
- Dates: 24 to 29 August 2019
- Competitors: 36 from 10 nations

Medalists
gold medal	Owen Wright	Australia
silver medal	Gabriel Medina	Brazil

The Tahiti Pro Teahupo'o 2019 was the seventh event of the Men's Championship Tour in the 2019 World Surf League. It took place from 24 to 29 August at Teahupo'o in Tahiti, French Polynesia, and was contested by 36 surfers.

In the final, Australia's Owen Wright defeated Brazil's Gabriel Medina to win the fourth Championship Tour event of his career.

== Format ==
A new competition format was introduced for the 2019 Championship Tour. All 36 surfers take part in the Seeding Round. The top two surfers in each heat advance directly to the Round of 32, while the lowest-placed surfer in each heat enters the Elimination Round. In each of the four heats in the Elimination Round, the top two surfers advance to the Round of 32, while the lowest-placed surfer is eliminated from the competition. From the Round of 32 onwards, the competition follows a single elimination format, with the winner of each head-to-head heat advancing to the next round and the loser being eliminated.

== Competition ==
The competition took place from 24 to 29 August.

=== Seeding Round ===
Heat 1
1	Soli Bailey	(Australia)	9.50
2	Gabriel Medina	(Brazil)	6.13
3	Peterson Crisanto	(Brazil)	0.77

Heat 2
1	Adrian Buchan	(Australia)	11.50
2	Jadson André	(Brazil)	9.90
3	Jordy Smith	(South Africa)	3.00

Heat 3
1	Kanoa Igarashi	(Japan)	8.83
2	Adriano de Souza	(Brazil)	5.50
3	Caio Ibelli	(Brazil)	3.70

Heat 4
1	Italo Ferreira	(Brazil)	12.16
2	Kauli Vaast	(France)	7.07
3	Sebastian Zietz	(Hawaii)	1.20

Heat 5
1	Joan Duru	(France)	9.37
2	Filipe Toledo	(Brazil)	8.70
3	Tyler Newton	(Hawaii)	3.54

Heat 6
1	Kolohe Andino	(United States)	11.73
2	Yago Dora	(Brazil)	11.20
3	Matahi Drollet	(French Polynesia)	5.56

Heat 7
1	Kelly Slater	(United States)	10.63
2	Deivid Silva	(Brazil)	8.76
3	Frederico Morais	(Portugal)	8.00

Heat 8
1	Ricardo Christie	(New Zealand)	10.23
2	Willian Cardoso	(Brazil)	9.67
3	Ryan Callinan	(Australia)	7.54

Heat 9
1	Ezekiel Lau	(Hawaii)	12.66
2	Julian Wilson	(Australia)	11.60
3	M. Rodrigues	(Brazil)	9.34

Heat 10
1	Griffin Colapinto	(United States)	10.50
2	Jérémy Florès	(France)	8.77
3	Michel Bourez	(France)	6.90

Heat 11
1	Owen Wright	(Australia)	11.33
2	Wade Carmichael	(Australia)	9.36
3	Jesse Mendes	(Brazil)	6.26

Heat 12
1	Seth Moniz	(Hawaii)	11.70
2	Jack Freestone	(Australia)	10.13
3	Conner Coffin	(United States)	9.67

=== Elimination round ===
Heat 1
1	Sebastian Zietz	(Hawaii)	14.40
2	Jordy Smith	(South Africa)	11.87
3	Matahi Drollet	(French Polynesia)	9.57

Heat 2
1	Ryan Callinan	(Australia)	12.50
2	Caio Ibelli	(Brazil)	8.74
3	Tyler Newton	(Hawaii)	6.57

Heat 3
1	Peterson Crisanto	(Brazil)	11.50
2	Michel Bourez	(France)	11.33
3	Frederico Morais	(Portugal)	10.17

Heat 4
1	Conner Coffin	(United States)	15.43
2	Jesse Mendes	(Brazil)	9.93
3	M. Rodrigues	(Brazil)	6.66

=== Round of 32 ===
Heat 1: 1 / Jadson André / (Brazil) / 12.16; 2 / Kanoa Igarashi / (Japan) / 9.00	Heat 2: 1 / Deivid Silva / (Brazil) / 10.10; 2 / Adrian Buchan / (Australia) / 9.34	Heat 3: 1 / Owen Wright / (Australia) / 12.73; 2 / Soli Bailey / (Australia) / 12.36	Heat 4: 1 / Michel Bourez / (France) / 11.60; 2 / Sebastian Zietz / (Hawaii) / 11.23

Heat 5: 1 / Adriano de Souza / (Brazil) / 17.87; 2 / Italo Ferreira / (Brazil) / 16.83	Heat 6: 1 / Joan Duru / (France) / 14.67; 2 / Willian Cardoso / (Brazil) / 1.43	Heat 7: 1 / Jordy Smith / (South Africa) / 13.20; 2 / Ricardo Christie / (New Zealand) / 7.74	Heat 8: 1 / Julian Wilson / (Australia) / 14.57; 2 / Yago Dora / (Brazil) / 5.27

Heat 9: 1 / Kauli Vaast / (France) / 14.50; 2 / Kolohe Andino / (United States) / 12.16	Heat 10: 1 / Jérémy Florès / (France) / 10.27; 2 / Wade Carmichael / (Australia) / 8.74	Heat 11: 1 / Griffin Colapinto / (United States) / 18.10; 2 / Ryan Callinan / (Australia) / 14.07	Heat 12: 1 / Gabriel Medina / (Brazil) / 14.03; 2 / Ezekiel Lau / (Hawaii) / 10.00

Heat 13: 1 / Filipe Toledo / (Brazil) / 12.00; 2 / Jesse Mendes / (Brazil) / 11.07	Heat 14: 1 / Seth Moniz / (Hawaii) / 14.67; 2 / Peterson Crisanto / (Brazil) / 9.66	Heat 15: 1 / Caio Ibelli / (Brazil) / 17.73; 2 / Conner Coffin / (United States) / 16.96	Heat 16: 1 / Jack Freestone / (Australia) / 17.17; 2 / Kelly Slater / (United States) / 14.20

=== Round of 16 ===
Heat 1: 1 / Jadson André / (Brazil) / 18.23; 2 / Deivid Silva / (Brazil) / 11.84	Heat 2: 1 / Owen Wright / (Australia) / 18.50; 2 / Michel Bourez / (France) / 18.10	Heat 3: 1 / Adriano de Souza / (Brazil) / 17.50; 2 / Joan Duru / (France) / 9.27	Heat 4: 1 / Jordy Smith / (South Africa) / 13.54; 2 / Julian Wilson / (Australia) / 10.83

Heat 5: 1 / Jérémy Florès / (France) / 15.76; 2 / Kauli Vaast / (France) / 13.66	Heat 6: 1 / Gabriel Medina / (Brazil) / 19.23; 2 / Griffin Colapinto / (United States) / 15.43	Heat 7: 1 / Seth Moniz / (Hawaii) / 16.40; 2 / Filipe Toledo / (Brazil) / 6.17	Heat 8: 1 / Caio Ibelli / (Brazil) / 18.64; 2 / Jack Freestone / (Australia) / 15.83

=== Quarterfinals ===
Heat 1: 1 / Owen Wright / (Australia) / 19.07; 2 / Jadson André / (Brazil) / 16.67	Heat 2: 1 / Jordy Smith / (South Africa) / 14.06; 2 / Adriano de Souza / (Brazil) / 8.67	Heat 3: 1 / Gabriel Medina / (Brazil) / 11.77; 2 / Jérémy Florès / (France) / 2.50	Heat 4: 1 / Seth Moniz / (Hawaii) / 15.60; 2 / Caio Ibelli / (Brazil) / 12.83

=== Semifinals ===
Heat 1: 1 / Owen Wright / (Australia) / 15.67; 2 / Jordy Smith / (South Africa) / 10.66	Heat 2: 1 / Gabriel Medina / (Brazil) / 11.16; 2 / Seth Moniz / (Hawaii) / 7.43

=== Final ===
Heat 1
1	Owen Wright	(Australia)	17.07
2	Gabriel Medina	(Brazil)	14.93
