= Billabong Pipe Masters 2019 =

Surfing comepetition

Billabong Pipe Masters
- Venue: Banzai Pipeline
- Location: Oahu, Hawaii, United States
- Dates: 9 to 19 December 2019
- Competitors: 36 from 10 nations

Medalists
gold medal	Italo Ferreira	Brazil
silver medal	Gabriel Medina	Brazil

The Billabong Pipe Masters 2019 was the 11th and final event of the Men's Championship Tour in the 2019 World Surf League. It took place from 9 to 19 December at the Banzai Pipeline in Oahu, Hawaii, and was contested by 36 surfers.

In an all-Brazilian final, Italo Ferreira defeated Gabriel Medina to win the sixth Championship Tour event of his career. The victory also secured a first World Surf League championship for Ferreira.

== Format ==
A new competition format was introduced for the 2019 Championship Tour. All 36 surfers take part in the Seeding Round. The top two surfers in each heat advance directly to the Round of 32, while the lowest-placed surfer in each heat enters the Elimination Round. In each of the four heats in the Elimination Round, the top two surfers advance to the Round of 32, while the lowest-placed surfer is eliminated from the competition. From the Round of 32 onwards, the competition follows a single elimination format, with the winner of each head-to-head heat advancing to the next round and the loser being eliminated.

== Competition ==
The competition took place from 9 to 19 December.

=== Seeding Round ===
Heat 1
1	Soli Bailey	(Australia)	14.33
2	Conner Coffin	(United States)	7.17
3	Kanoa Igarashi	(Japan)	4.70

Heat 2
1	Kolohe Andino	(United States)	7.27
2	Griffin Colapinto	(United States)	4.34
3	Jadson André	(Brazil)	3.33

Heat 3
1	Filipe Toledo	(Brazil)	11.93
2	Deivid Silva	(Brazil)	6.07
3	Ricardo Christie	(New Zealand)	4.10

Heat 4
1	Peterson Crisanto	(Brazil)	7.36
2	Jordy Smith	(South Africa)	7.33
3	Frederico Morais	(Portugal)	2.60

Heat 5
1	Gabriel Medina	(Brazil)	17.30
2	Willian Cardoso	(Brazil)	7.56
3	Imaikalani deVault	(Hawaii)	6.10

Heat 6
1	Billy Kemper	(Hawaii)	15.63
2	Italo Ferreira	(Brazil)	10.67
3	Michael Rodrigues	(Brazil)	5.60

Heat 7
1	Owen Wright	(Australia)	7.94
2	Jack Freestone	(Australia)	4.90
3	L. Fioravanti	(Italy)	1.40

Heat 8
1	Adrian Buchan	(Australia)	7.76
2	Jesse Mendes	(Brazil)	7.33
3	John Florence	(Hawaii)	4.57

Heat 9
1	Ezekiel Lau	(Hawaii)	16.93
2	Caio Ibelli	(Brazil)	15.00
3	Jérémy Florès	(France)	11.60

Heat 10
1	Michel Bourez	(France)	11.33
2	Kelly Slater	(United States)	9.10
3	Sebastian Zietz	(Hawaii)	4.90

Heat 11
1	Joan Duru	(France)	15.00
2	Julian Wilson	(Australia)	4.60
3	Wade Carmichael	(Australia)	4.23

Heat 12
1	Seth Moniz	(Hawaii)	9.34
2	Ryan Callinan	(Australia)	5.77
3	Yago Dora	(Brazil)	1.90

=== Elimination round ===
Heat 1
1	Kanoa Igarashi	(Japan)	13.60
2	Imaikalani deVault	(Hawaii)	8.00
3	L. Fioravanti	(Italy)	3.26

Heat 2
1	John Florence	(Hawaii)	10.93
2	Sebastian Zietz	(Hawaii)	9.16
3	Frederico Morais	(Portugal)	2.70

Heat 3
1	Yago Dora	(Brazil)	8.60
2	Ricardo Christie	(New Zealand)	6.80
3	Jérémy Florès	(France)	6.04

Heat 4
1	Jadson André	(Brazil)	12.40
2	Wade Carmichael	(Australia)	9.57
3	Michael Rodrigues	(Brazil)	8.07

=== Round of 32 ===
Heat 1: 1 / Italo Ferreira / (Brazil) / 8.53; 2 / Jadson André / (Brazil) / 7.20	Heat 2: 1 / Peterson Crisanto / (Brazil) / 10.17; 2 / Conner Coffin / (United States) / 9.77	Heat 3: 1 / Yago Dora / (Brazil) / 11.30; 2 / Owen Wright / (Australia) / 10.50	Heat 4: 1 / Julian Wilson / (Australia) / 8.30; 2 / Willian Cardoso / (Brazil) / 3.40

Heat 5: 1 / Ricardo Christie / (New Zealand) / 11.04; 2 / Filipe Toledo / (Brazil) / 9.84	Heat 6: 1 / Jack Freestone / (Australia) / 11.76; 2 / Ryan Callinan / (Australia) / 7.53	Heat 7: 1 / Seth Moniz / (Hawaii) / 15.26; 2 / Billy Kemper / (Hawaii) / 13.00	Heat 8: 1 / Kelly Slater / (United States) / 17.33; 2 / Joan Duru / (France) / 14.23

Heat 9: 1 / Gabriel Medina / (Brazil) / 17.07; 2 / Imaikalani deVault / (Hawaii) / 13.90	Heat 10: 1 / Caio Ibelli / (Brazil) / 8.84; 2 / Wade Carmichael / (Australia) / 4.43	Heat 11: 1 / John Florence / (Hawaii) / 18.50; 2 / Ezekiel Lau / (Hawaii) / 4.50	Heat 12: 1 / Soli Bailey / (Australia) / 9.10; 2 / Kanoa Igarashi / (Japan) / 7.54

Heat 13: 1 / Jesse Mendes / (Brazil) / 9.10; 2 / Jordy Smith / (South Africa) / 7.50	Heat 14: 1 / Griffin Colapinto / (United States) / 9.34; 2 / Adrian Buchan / (Australia) / 9.10	Heat 15: 1 / Michel Bourez / (France) / 15.24; 2 / Deivid Silva / (Brazil) / 8.94	Heat 16: 1 / Kolohe Andino / (United States) / 10.17; 2 / Sebastian Zietz / (Hawaii) / 8.33

=== Round of 16 ===
Heat 1: 1 / Italo Ferreira / (Brazil) / 11.84; 2 / Peterson Crisanto / (Brazil) / 4.23	Heat 2: 1 / Yago Dora / (Brazil) / 7.50; 2 / Julian Wilson / (Australia) / 6.27	Heat 3: 1 / Jack Freestone / (Australia) / 5.00; 2 / Ricardo Christie / (New Zealand) / 4.23	Heat 4: 1 / Kelly Slater / (United States) / 7.33; 2 / Seth Moniz / (Hawaii) / 6.20

Heat 5: 1 / Gabriel Medina / (Brazil) / 4.23^{[I]}; 2 / Caio Ibelli / (Brazil) / 1.13	Heat 6: 1 / John Florence / (Hawaii) / 5.66; 2 / Soli Bailey / (Australia) / 3.90	Heat 7: 1 / Griffin Colapinto / (United States) / 10.67; 2 / Jesse Mendes / (Brazil) / 8.50	Heat 8: 1 / Michel Bourez / (France) / 13.43; 2 / Kolohe Andino / (United States) / 9.50

=== Quarterfinals ===
Heat 1: 1 / Italo Ferreira / (Brazil) / 15.66; 2 / Yago Dora / (Brazil) / 13.50	Heat 2: 1 / Kelly Slater / (United States) / 12.94; 2 / Jack Freestone / (Australia) / 9.26	Heat 3: 1 / Gabriel Medina / (Brazil) / 17.63; 2 / John Florence / (Hawaii) / 12.33	Heat 4: 1 / Griffin Colapinto / (United States) / 9.84; 2 / Michel Bourez / (France) / 8.77

=== Semifinals ===
Heat 1: 1 / Italo Ferreira / (Brazil) / 14.77; 2 / Kelly Slater / (United States) / 2.57	Heat 2: 1 / Gabriel Medina / (Brazil) / 13.00; 2 / Griffin Colapinto / (United States) / 7.10

=== Final ===
Heat 1
1	Italo Ferreira	(Brazil)	15.56
2	Gabriel Medina	(Brazil)	12.94
