= Corona Open J-Bay 2019 =

Corona Open J-Bay
- Location: Jeffreys Bay, Eastern Cape, South Africa
- Dates: 9 to 19 July 2019
- Competitors: 36 from 9 nations

Medalists
gold medal	Gabriel Medina	Brazil
silver medal	Italo Ferreira	Brazil

The Corona Open J-Bay 2019 was the sixth event of the Men's Championship Tour in the 2019 World Surf League. It took place from 9 to 19 July at Jeffreys Bay in Eastern Cape, South Africa, and was contested by 36 surfers.

In an all-Brazilian final, Gabriel Medina defeated Italo Ferreira to win the 13th Championship Tour event of his career. He also became the first goofy foot surfer to win the J-Bay Open since 1984.

== Format ==
A new competition format was introduced for the 2019 Championship Tour. All 36 surfers take part in the Seeding Round. The top two surfers in each heat advance directly to the Round of 32, while the lowest-placed surfer in each heat enters the Elimination Round. In each of the four heats in the Elimination Round, the top two surfers advance to the Round of 32, while the lowest-placed surfer is eliminated from the competition. From the Round of 32 onwards, the competition follows a single elimination format, with the winner of each head-to-head heat advancing to the next round and the loser being eliminated.

== Competition ==
The competition took place from 9 to 19 July.

=== Seeding Round ===
Heat 1
1	Gabriel Medina	(Brazil)	12.03
2	Joan Duru	(France)	10.57
3	Frederico Morais	(Portugal)	9.00

Heat 2
1	Italo Ferreira	(Brazil)	14.43
2	Soli Bailey	(Australia)	10.67
3	Peterson Crisanto	(Brazil)	10.34

Heat 3
1	Kanoa Igarashi	(Japan)	12.16
2	Adriano de Souza	(Brazil)	7.33
3	Jesse Mendes	(Brazil)	6.74

Heat 4
1	Jordy Smith	(South Africa)	13.77
2	Caio Ibelli	(Brazil)	9.27
3	Jorgann Couzinet	(France)	8.67

Heat 5
1	Kolohe Andino	(United States)	11.43
2	Yago Dora	(Brazil)	9.84
3	Beyrick De Vries	(South Africa)	8.30

Heat 6
1	Filipe Toledo	(Brazil)	17.60
2	Michael February	(South Africa)	12.83
3	Adrian Buchan	(Australia)	11.77

Heat 7
1	Julian Wilson	(Australia)	13.97
2	Deivid Silva	(Brazil)	10.60
3	Jadson André	(Brazil)	10.56

Heat 8
1	Ezekiel Lau	(Hawaii)	13.17
2	Conner Coffin	(United States)	11.84
3	Willian Cardoso	(Brazil)	5.27

Heat 9
1	Ricardo Christie	(New Zealand)	10.66
2	M. Rodrigues	(Brazil)	9.03
3	Ryan Callinan	(Australia)	6.10

Heat 10
1	Sebastian Zietz	(Hawaii)	12.40
2	Kelly Slater	(United States)	10.67
3	Jérémy Florès	(France)	9.27

Heat 11
1	Michel Bourez	(France)	12.24
2	Owen Wright	(Australia)	12.00
3	Jack Freestone	(Australia)	11.86

Heat 12
1	Wade Carmichael	(Australia)	13.24
2	Griffin Colapinto	(United States)	13.23
3	Seth Moniz	(Hawaii)	10.83

=== Elimination round ===
Heat 1
1	Jack Freestone	(Australia)	15.93
2	Ryan Callinan	(Australia)	11.40
3	Beyrick De Vries	(South Africa)	11.14

Heat 2
1	Seth Moniz	(Hawaii)	14.27
2	Adrian Buchan	(Australia)	12.03
3	Jorgann Couzinet	(France)	11.73

Heat 3
1	Jérémy Florès	(France)	15.84
2	Frederico Morais	(Portugal)	13.23
3	Jesse Mendes	(Brazil)	11.83

Heat 4
1	Peterson Crisanto	(Brazil)	13.07
2	Willian Cardoso	(Brazil)	12.20
3	Jadson André	(Brazil)	11.86

=== Round of 32 ===
Heat 1: 1 / Jordy Smith / (South Africa) / 15.67; 2 / Soli Bailey / (Australia) / 10.74	Heat 2: 1 / Owen Wright / (Australia) / 11.40; 2 / Joan Duru / (France) / 11.27	Heat 3: 1 / Gabriel Medina / (Brazil) / 15.00; 2 / Griffin Colapinto / (United States) / 10.00	Heat 4: 1 / Ryan Callinan / (Australia) / 13.10; 2 / Yago Dora / (Brazil) / 11.33

Heat 5: 1 / Kolohe Andino / (United States) / 12.33; 2 / Adriano de Souza / (Brazil) / 9.80	Heat 6: 1 / Deivid Silva / (Brazil) / 13.43; 2 / Jérémy Florès / (France) / 11.70	Heat 7: 1 / Ezekiel Lau / (Hawaii) / 11.60; 2 / Julian Wilson / (Australia) / 10.56	Heat 8: 1 / Adrian Buchan / (Australia) / 14.74; 2 / Conner Coffin / (United States) / 10.86

Heat 9: 1 / Filipe Toledo / (Brazil) / 14.77; 2 / Michael February / (South Africa) / 10.40	Heat 10: 1 / Willian Cardoso / (Brazil) / 14.03; 2 / M. Rodrigues / (Brazil) / 12.10	Heat 11: 1 / Sebastian Zietz / (Hawaii) / 14.94; 2 / Wade Carmichael / (Australia) / 11.50	Heat 12: 1 / Michel Bourez / (France) / 13.60; 2 / Ricardo Christie / (New Zealand) / 12.83

Heat 13: 1 / Kanoa Igarashi / (Japan) / 17.53; 2 / Frederico Morais / (Portugal) / 13.50	Heat 14: 1 / Peterson Crisanto / (Brazil) / 13.50; 2 / Seth Moniz / (Hawaii) / 11.66	Heat 15: 1 / Kelly Slater / (United States) / 13.57; 2 / Caio Ibelli / (Brazil) / 11.90	Heat 16: 1 / Italo Ferreira / (Brazil) / 15.16; 2 / Jack Freestone / (Australia) / 9.70

=== Round of 16 ===
Heat 1: 1 / Owen Wright / (Australia) / 16.23; 2 / Jordy Smith / (South Africa) / 14.70	Heat 2: 1 / Gabriel Medina / (Brazil) / 12.94; 2 / Ryan Callinan / (Australia) / 11.67	Heat 3: 1 / Kolohe Andino / (United States) / 12.73; 2 / Deivid Silva / (Brazil) / 12.14	Heat 4: 1 / Adrian Buchan / (Australia) / 13.43; 2 / Ezekiel Lau / (Hawaii) / 13.00

Heat 5: 1 / Filipe Toledo / (Brazil) / 18.26; 2 / Willian Cardoso / (Brazil) / 11.33	Heat 6: 1 / Sebastian Zietz / (Hawaii) / 13.83; 2 / Michel Bourez / (France) / 11.44	Heat 7: 1 / Kanoa Igarashi / (Japan) / 17.24; 2 / Peterson Crisanto / (Brazil) / 11.73	Heat 8: 1 / Italo Ferreira / (Brazil) / 14.06; 2 / Kelly Slater / (United States) / 12.20

=== Quarterfinals ===
Heat 1: 1 / Gabriel Medina / (Brazil) / 15.67; 2 / Owen Wright / (Australia) / 14.60	Heat 2: 1 / Kolohe Andino / (United States) / 15.43; 2 / Adrian Buchan / (Australia) / 14.10	Heat 3: 1 / Filipe Toledo / (Brazil) / 15.00; 2 / Sebastian Zietz / (Hawaii) / 14.40	Heat 4: 1 / Italo Ferreira / (Brazil) / 15.53; 2 / Kanoa Igarashi / (Japan) / 12.37

=== Semifinals ===
Heat 1: 1 / Gabriel Medina / (Brazil) / 14.30; 2 / Kolohe Andino / (United States) / 14.00	Heat 2: 1 / Italo Ferreira / (Brazil) / 17.50; 2 / Filipe Toledo / (Brazil) / 14.00

=== Final ===
Heat 1
1	Gabriel Medina	(Brazil)	19.50
2	Italo Ferreira	(Brazil)	16.77
