= Oi Rio Pro 2019 =

Oi Rio Pro
- Location: Saquarema, Rio de Janeiro, Brazil
- Dates: 20 to 23 June 2019
- Competitors: 36 from 9 nations

Medalists
gold medal	Filipe Toledo	Brazil
silver medal	Jordy Smith	South Africa

The Oi Rio Pro 2019 was the fifth event of the Men's Championship Tour in the 2019 World Surf League. It took place from 20 to 23 June in Saquarema, Rio de Janeiro, and was contested by 36 surfers.

In the final, Brazil's Filipe Toledo defeated Jordy Smith of South Africa to win the eighth Championship Tour event of his career.

== Format ==
A new competition format was introduced for the 2019 Championship Tour. All 36 surfers take part in the Seeding Round. The top two surfers in each heat advance directly to the Round of 32, while the lowest-placed surfer in each heat enters the Elimination Round. In each of the four heats in the Elimination Round, the top two surfers advance to the Round of 32, while the lowest-placed surfer is eliminated from the competition. From the Round of 32 onwards, the competition follows a single elimination format, with the winner of each head-to-head heat advancing to the next round and the loser being eliminated.

== Competition ==
The competition took place from 20 to 23 June.

=== Seeding Round ===
Heat 1
1	Kanoa Igarashi	(Japan)	12.17
2	Jadson André	(Brazil)	10.60
3	Peterson Crisanto	(Brazil)	7.83

Heat 2
1	Gabriel Medina	(Brazil)	12.10
2	Soli Bailey	(Australia)	8.40
3	Adrian Buchan	(Australia)	6.93

Heat 3
1	Yago Dora	(Brazil)	16.33
2	Adriano de Souza	(Brazil)	11.27
3	Kolohe Andino	(United States)	11.16

Heat 4
1	Filipe Toledo	(Brazil)	13.97
2	Frederico Morais	(Portugal)	9.60
3	Sebastian Zietz	(Hawaii)	9.30

Heat 5
1	Italo Ferreira	(Brazil)	12.17
2	Deivid Silva	(Brazil)	11.07
3	Mateus Herdy	(Brazil)	Injured

Heat 6
1	John Florence	(Hawaii)	13.67
2	Caio Ibelli	(Brazil)	10.53
3	Alex Ribeiro	(Brazil)	9.60

Heat 7
1	Willian Cardoso	(Brazil)	10.47
2	Ricardo Christie	(New Zealand)	9.00
3	Jordy Smith	(South Africa)	6.30

Heat 8
1	Julian Wilson	(Australia)	12.67
2	M. Rodrigues	(Brazil)	9.06
3	Ezekiel Lau	(Hawaii)	6.00

Heat 9
1	Kelly Slater	(United States)	10.87
2	Griffin Colapinto	(United States)	10.80
3	Conner Coffin	(United States)	9.93

Heat 10
1	Seth Moniz	(Hawaii)	13.77
2	Owen Wright	(Australia)	11.90
3	Jack Freestone	(Australia)	7.43

Heat 11
1	Ryan Callinan	(Australia)	13.17
2	Jesse Mendes	(Brazil)	11.53
3	Wade Carmichael	(Australia)	9.74

Heat 12
1	Michel Bourez	(France)	11.13
2	Joan Duru	(France)	10.76
3	Jérémy Florès	(France)	7.23

=== Elimination round ===
Heat 1
1	Sebastian Zietz	(Hawaii)	12.77
2	Kolohe Andino	(United States)	12.00
3	Alex Ribeiro	(Brazil)	7.33

Heat 2
1	K. Kymerson	(Brazil)	11.43
2	Jordy Smith	(South Africa)	9.67
3	Adrian Buchan	(Australia)	7.54

Heat 3
1	Conner Coffin	(United States)	14.83
2	Ezekiel Lau	(Hawaii)	10.73
3	Peterson Crisanto	(Brazil)	7.54

Heat 4
1	Wade Carmichael	(Australia)	11.77
2	Jack Freestone	(Australia)	9.10
3	Jérémy Florès	(France)	8.46

=== Round of 32 ===
Heat 1: 1 / Filipe Toledo / (Brazil) / 14.26; 2 / Adriano de Souza / (Brazil) / 10.27	Heat 2: 1 / Kelly Slater / (United States) / 11.93; 2 / Sebastian Zietz / (Hawaii) / 8.20	Heat 3: 1 / Kanoa Igarashi / (Japan) / 13.67; 2 / Ricardo Christie / (New Zealand) / 10.37	Heat 4: 1 / Joan Duru / (France) / 12.40; 2 / Owen Wright / (Australia) / 10.13

Heat 5: 1 / Frederico Morais / (Portugal) / 13.27; 2 / Italo Ferreira / (Brazil) / 7.13	Heat 6: 1 / M. Rodrigues / (Brazil) / 12.06; 2 / Willian Cardoso / (Brazil) / 6.20	Heat 7: 1 / Julian Wilson / (Australia) / 8.90; 2 / Ezekiel Lau / (Hawaii) / 6.10	Heat 8: 1 / Jesse Mendes / (Brazil) / 11.60; 2 / Conner Coffin / (United States) / 11.10

Heat 9: 1 / John Florence / (Hawaii) / 11.83; 2 / K. Kymerson / (Brazil) / 9.24	Heat 10: 1 / Wade Carmichael / (Australia) / 12.37; 2 / Yago Dora / (Brazil) / 11.40	Heat 11: 1 / Jordy Smith / (South Africa) / 15.83; 2 / Jack Freestone / (Australia) / 11.00	Heat 12: 1 / Griffin Colapinto / (United States) / 10.73; 2 / Ryan Callinan / (Australia) / 7.57

Heat 13: 1 / Kolohe Andino / (United States) / 12.87; 2 / Soli Bailey / (Australia) / 8.56	Heat 14: 1 / Deivid Silva / (Brazil) / 14.83; 2 / Seth Moniz / (Hawaii) / 8.33	Heat 15: 1 / Michel Bourez / (France) / 11.44; 2 / Caio Ibelli / (Brazil) / 6.10	Heat 16: 1 / Gabriel Medina / (Brazil) / 13.00; 2 / Jadson André / (Brazil) / 10.90

=== Round of 16 ===
Heat 1: 1 / Filipe Toledo / (Brazil) / 17.84; 2 / Kelly Slater / (United States) / 14.83	Heat 2: 1 / Kanoa Igarashi / (Japan) / 13.17; 2 / Joan Duru / (France) / 10.83	Heat 3: 1 / Frederico Morais / (Portugal) / 12.83; 2 / M. Rodrigues / (Brazil) / 7.43	Heat 4: 1 / Julian Wilson / (Australia) / 14.00; 2 / Jesse Mendes / (Brazil) / 13.60

Heat 5: 1 / John Florence / (Hawaii) / 12.66; 2 / Wade Carmichael / (Australia) / 10.33	Heat 6: 1 / Jordy Smith / (South Africa) / 15.63; 2 / Griffin Colapinto / (United States) / 9.67	Heat 7: 1 / Kolohe Andino / (United States) / 14.07; 2 / Deivid Silva / (Brazil) / 11.53	Heat 8: 1 / Gabriel Medina / (Brazil) / 14.43; 2 / Michel Bourez / (France) / 9.27

=== Quarterfinals ===
Heat 1: 1 / Filipe Toledo / (Brazil) / 11.00; 2 / Kanoa Igarashi / (Japan) / 7.57	Heat 2: 1 / Frederico Morais / (Portugal) / 13.17; 2 / Julian Wilson / (Australia) / 11.83	Heat 3: 1 / Jordy Smith / (South Africa) / w/o; 2 / John Florence / (Hawaii) / Injured	Heat 4: 1 / Kolohe Andino / (United States) / 13.10; 2 / Gabriel Medina / (Brazil) / 12.00

=== Semifinals ===
Heat 1: 1 / Filipe Toledo / (Brazil) / 16.00; 2 / Frederico Morais / (Portugal) / 10.30	Heat 2: 1 / Jordy Smith / (South Africa) / 16.06; 2 / Kolohe Andino / (United States) / 10.40

=== Final ===
Heat 1
1	Filipe Toledo	(Brazil)	18.04
2	Jordy Smith	(South Africa)	8.43
