= Quiksilver Pro Gold Coast 2019 =

Quiksilver Pro Gold Coast
- Location: Gold Coast, Queensland, Australia
- Dates: 3 to 8 April 2019
- Competitors: 36 from 9 nations

Medalists
gold medal	Italo Ferreira	Brazil
silver medal	Kolohe Andino	United States

The Quiksilver Pro Gold Coast 2019 was the first event of the Men's Championship Tour in the 2019 World Surf League. It took place at Coolangatta in Gold Coast, Queensland, and was contested by 36 surfers.

The event window was 3 to 13 April, but the competition was completed between 3 and 8 April.

Italo Ferreira defeated Kolohe Andino in the final to win the fourth World Surf League event of his career.

== Format ==
A new competition format was introduced for the 2019 Championship Tour. All 36 surfers take part in Round 1. The top two surfers in each heat advance directly to Round 3, while the lowest-placed surfer in each heat enters Round 2. In each of the four heats in Round 2, the top two surfers advance to Round 3, while the lowest-placed surfer is eliminated from the competition. From Round 3 onwards, all heats are head-to-head, with the winner advancing to the next round and the loser being eliminated.

== Competition ==
The competition started on 3 April, with the final taking place on 8 April.

=== Round 1 ===
Heat 1
1	Griffin Colapinto	(United States)	10.26
2	Soli Bailey	(Australia)	9.83
3	Owen Wright	(Australia)	8.23

Heat 2
1	Jack Freestone	(Australia)	10.67
2	Ezekiel Lau	(Hawaii)	10.47
3	Jordy Smith	(South Africa)	5.03

Heat 3
1	Yago Dora	(Brazil)	14.33
2	Italo Ferreira	(Brazil)	11.93
3	Kelly Slater	(United States)	9.70

Heat 4
1	Joan Duru	(France)	11.10
2	Filipe Toledo	(Brazil)	9.53
3	Caio Ibelli	(Brazil)	7.60

Heat 5
1	Seth Moniz	(Hawaii)	11.17
2	Reef Heazlewood	(Australia)	9.50
3	Julian Wilson	(Australia)	8.36

Heat 6
1	Gabriel Medina	(Brazil)	13.84
2	Ryan Callinan	(Australia)	13.57
3	Mateus Herdy	(Brazil)	7.23

Heat 7
1	Adrian Buchan	(Australia)	10.13
2	Conner Coffin	(United States)	10.00
3	Jadson André	(Brazil)	8.40

Heat 8
1	Michel Bourez	(France)	13.27
2	Jérémy Florès	(France)	8.90
3	L. Fioravanti	(Italy)	7.57

Heat 9
1	M. Rodrigues	(Brazil)	13.17
2	Wade Carmichael	(Australia)	13.07
3	Ricardo Christie	(New Zealand)	12.67

Heat 10
1	Kanoa Igarashi	(Japan)	12.73
2	Deivid Silva	(Brazil)	12.00
3	Sebastian Zietz	(Hawaii)	8.03

Heat 11
1	Kolohe Andino	(United States)	11.00
2	Jesse Mendes	(Brazil)	10.90
3	Willian Cardoso	(Brazil)	8.40

Heat 12
1	Mikey Wright	(Australia)	12.10
2	John Florence	(Hawaii)	10.93
3	Peterson Crisanto	(Brazil)	8.36

=== Round 2 ===
Heat 1
1	Mateus Herdy	(Brazil)	12.77
2	Julian Wilson	(Australia)	11.23
3	L. Fioravanti	(Italy)	10.66

Heat 2
1	Jordy Smith	(South Africa)	13.93
2	Ricardo Christie	(New Zealand)	12.56
3	Caio Ibelli	(Brazil)	10.63

Heat 3
1	Owen Wright	(Australia)	13.73
2	Peterson Crisanto	(Brazil)	13.50
3	Kelly Slater	(United States)	10.63

Heat 4
1	Willian Cardoso	(Brazil)	12.93
2	Sebastian Zietz	(Hawaii)	11.64
3	Jadson André	(Brazil)	8.90

=== Round 3 ===
Heat 1: 1 / Filipe Toledo / (Brazil) / 13.93; 2 / Soli Bailey / (Australia) / 11.50	Heat 2: 1 / John Florence / (Hawaii) / 14.83; 2 / Adrian Buchan / (Australia) / 11.20	Heat 3: 1 / Kanoa Igarashi / (Japan) / 13.14; 2 / Jesse Mendes / (Brazil) / 8.50	Heat 4: 1 / Conner Coffin / (United States) / 11.00; 2 / Jérémy Florès / (France) / 8.70

Heat 5: 1 / Reef Heazlewood / (Australia) / 16.07; 2 / Julian Wilson / (Australia) / 13.40	Heat 6: 1 / Seth Moniz / (Hawaii) / 12.60; 2 / Griffin Colapinto / (United States) / 12.57	Heat 7: 1 / Kolohe Andino / (United States) / 14.10; 2 / Peterson Crisanto / (Brazil) / 12.90	Heat 8: 1 / Owen Wright / (Australia) / 10.14; 2 / Ezekiel Lau / (Hawaii) / 5.00

Heat 9: 1 / Gabriel Medina / (Brazil) / 19.13; 2 / Mateus Herdy / (Brazil) / 12.23	Heat 10: 1 / Yago Dora / (Brazil) / 15.64; 2 / Joan Duru / (France) / 14.57	Heat 11: 1 / Jordy Smith / (South Africa) / 11.27; 2 / Ryan Callinan / (Australia) / 10.53	Heat 12: 1 / Mikey Wright / (Australia) / 14.26; 2 / Jack Freestone / (Australia) / 10.47

Heat 13: 1 / Italo Ferreira / (Brazil) / 16.53; 2 / Ricardo Christie / (New Zealand) / 13.10	Heat 14: 1 / Willian Cardoso / (Brazil) / 13.47; 2 / M. Rodrigues / (Brazil) / 12.13	Heat 15: 1 / Wade Carmichael / (Australia) / 15.50; 2 / Sebastian Zietz / (Hawaii) / 8.80	Heat 16: 1 / Michel Bourez / (France) / 10.96; 2 / Deivid Silva / (Brazil) / 9.70

=== Round 4 ===
Heat 1: 1 / John Florence / (Hawaii) / 14.06; 2 / Filipe Toledo / (Brazil) / 13.27	Heat 2: 1 / Conner Coffin / (United States) / 12.27; 2 / Kanoa Igarashi / (Japan) / 12.06	Heat 3: 1 / Seth Moniz / (Hawaii) / 13.37; 2 / Reef Heazlewood / (Australia) / 10.97	Heat 4: 1 / Kolohe Andino / (United States) / 12.03; 2 / Owen Wright / (Australia) / 11.23

Heat 5: 1 / Gabriel Medina / (Brazil) / 13.00; 2 / Yago Dora / (Brazil) / 12.53	Heat 6: 1 / Jordy Smith / (South Africa) / 13.57; 2 / Mikey Wright / (Australia) / 11.07	Heat 7: 1 / Italo Ferreira / (Brazil) / 12.70; 2 / Willian Cardoso / (Brazil) / 11.30	Heat 8: 1 / Wade Carmichael / (Australia) / 14.43; 2 / Michel Bourez / (France) / 10.70

=== Quarterfinals ===
Heat 1: 1 / John Florence / (Hawaii) / 11.00; 2 / Conner Coffin / (United States) / 10.56	Heat 2: 1 / Kolohe Andino / (United States) / 12.33; 2 / Seth Moniz / (Hawaii) / 11.47	Heat 3: 1 / Jordy Smith / (South Africa) / 13.17; 2 / Gabriel Medina / (Brazil) / 9.23	Heat 4: 1 / Italo Ferreira / (Brazil) / 11.07; 2 / Wade Carmichael / (Australia) / 9.77

=== Semifinals ===
Heat 1: 1 / Kolohe Andino / (United States) / 9.23; 2 / John Florence / (Hawaii) / 8.96	Heat 2: 1 / Italo Ferreira / (Brazil) / 15.33; 2 / Jordy Smith / (South Africa) / 14.67

=== Final ===
Heat 1
1	Italo Ferreira	(Brazil)	12.57
2	Kolohe Andino	(United States)	12.43
