= Quiksilver Pro France 2019 =

2019 World Surf League France stage

Quiksilver Pro France
- Venue: Capbreton, Hossegor and Seignosse
- Location: Landes, Nouvelle-Aquitaine, France
- Dates: 3 to 11 October 2019
- Competitors: 36 from 10 nations

Medalists
gold medal	Jérémy Florès	France
silver medal	Italo Ferreira	Brazil

The Quiksilver Pro France 2019 was the ninth event of the Men's Championship Tour in the 2019 World Surf League. It took place from 3 to 11 October at Capbreton, Hossegor and Seignosse in Landes, France, and was contested by 36 surfers.

In the final, France's Jérémy Florès defeated Brazil's Italo Ferreira to win the fourth Championship Tour event of his career and become the first Frenchman to win the event.

== Format ==
A new competition format was introduced for the 2019 Championship Tour. All 36 surfers take part in the Seeding Round. The top two surfers in each heat advance directly to the Round of 32, while the lowest-placed surfer in each heat enters the Elimination Round. In each of the four heats in the Elimination Round, the top two surfers advance to the Round of 32, while the lowest-placed surfer is eliminated from the competition. From the Round of 32 onwards, the competition follows a single elimination format, with the winner of each head-to-head heat advancing to the next round and the loser being eliminated.

== Competition ==
The competition took place from 3 to 11 October.

=== Seeding Round ===
Heat 1
1	Griffin Colapinto	(United States)	12.50
2	Kanoa Igarashi	(Japan)	11.90
3	Soli Bailey	(Australia)	8.07

Heat 2
1	Italo Ferreira	(Brazil)	11.94
2	Frederico Morais	(Portugal)	10.10
3	Caio Ibelli	(Brazil)	9.60

Heat 3
1	L. Fioravanti	(Italy)	14.40
2	Yago Dora	(Brazil)	14.33
3	Kolohe Andino	(United States)	14.00

Heat 4
1	Jorgann Couzinet	(France)	12.67
2	Jordy Smith	(South Africa)	12.66
3	Sebastian Zietz	(Hawaii)	9.26

Heat 5
1	Filipe Toledo	(Brazil)	12.63
2	Joan Duru	(France)	10.60
3	Marc Lacomare	(France)	9.74

Heat 6
1	Gabriel Medina	(Brazil)	14.40
2	M. Rodrigues	(Brazil)	11.87
3	Marco Mignot	(France)	11.04

Heat 7
1	Owen Wright	(Australia)	15.10
2	Willian Cardoso	(Brazil)	13.34
3	Ricardo Christie	(New Zealand)	7.94

Heat 8
1	Julian Wilson	(Australia)	11.44
2	Adrian Buchan	(Australia)	9.57
3	Jadson André	(Brazil)	9.47

Heat 9
1	Kelly Slater	(United States)	13.84
2	Jesse Mendes	(Brazil)	11.67
3	Conner Coffin	(United States)	9.94

Heat 10
1	Seth Moniz	(Hawaii)	12.24
2	Ezekiel Lau	(Hawaii)	10.50
3	Wade Carmichael	(Australia)	10.13

Heat 11
1	Peterson Crisanto	(Brazil)	13.84
2	Ryan Callinan	(Australia)	11.67
3	Deivid Silva	(Brazil)	11.67

Heat 12
1	Jack Freestone	(Australia)	11.77
2	Jérémy Florès	(France)	9.10
3	Michel Bourez	(France)	8.90

=== Elimination round ===
Heat 1
1	Kolohe Andino	(United States)	9.66
2	Marco Mignot	(France)	6.06
3	Jadson André	(Brazil)	2.46

Heat 2
1	Marc Lacomare	(France)	11.20
2	Michel Bourez	(France)	7.94
3	Sebastian Zietz	(Hawaii)	6.07

Heat 3
1	Soli Bailey	(Australia)	11.07
2	Caio Ibelli	(Brazil)	8.43
3	Deivid Silva	(Brazil)	4.30

Heat 4
1	Conner Coffin	(United States)	14.27
2	Wade Carmichael	(Australia)	8.80
3	Ricardo Christie	(New Zealand)	6.33

=== Round of 32 ===
Heat 1: 1 / Jordy Smith / (South Africa) / 13.83; 2 / Frederico Morais / (Portugal) / 12.40	Heat 2: 1 / Jérémy Florès / (France) / 8.37; 2 / Caio Ibelli / (Brazil) / 6.07	Heat 3: 1 / Ezekiel Lau / (Hawaii) / 11.16; 2 / Owen Wright / (Australia) / 5.30	Heat 4: 1 / Ryan Callinan / (Australia) / 14.33; 2 / M. Rodrigues / (Brazil) / 13.00

Heat 5: 1 / Marc Lacomare / (France) / 12.83; 2 / Filipe Toledo / (Brazil) / 12.17	Heat 6: 1 / Wade Carmichael / (Australia) / 11.93; 2 / Willian Cardoso / (Brazil) / 9.70	Heat 7: 1 / Julian Wilson / (Australia) / 11.33; 2 / Jorgann Couzinet / (France) / 6.17	Heat 8: 1 / Jack Freestone / (Australia) / 8.56; 2 / Kanoa Igarashi / (Japan) / 8.33

Heat 9: 1 / Gabriel Medina / (Brazil) / 9.76; 2 / Marco Mignot / (France) / 8.84	Heat 10: 1 / Adrian Buchan / (Australia) / 8.93; 2 / Conner Coffin / (United States) / 8.60	Heat 11: 1 / Seth Moniz / (Hawaii) / 12.60; 2 / Peterson Crisanto / (Brazil) / 10.77	Heat 12: 1 / L. Fioravanti / (Italy) / 12.43; 2 / Kelly Slater / (United States) / 11.00

Heat 13: 1 / Kolohe Andino / (United States) / 10.34; 2 / Soli Bailey / (Australia) / 9.27	Heat 14: 1 / Yago Dora / (Brazil) / 14.50; 2 / Griffin Colapinto / (United States) / 13.23	Heat 15: 1 / Michel Bourez / (France) / 11.67; 2 / Joan Duru / (France) / 7.56	Heat 16: 1 / Italo Ferreira / (Brazil) / 13.83; 2 / Jesse Mendes / (Brazil) / 11.77

=== Round of 16 ===
Heat 1: 1 / Jérémy Florès / (France) / 15.50; 2 / Jordy Smith / (South Africa) / 6.67	Heat 2: 1 / Ryan Callinan / (Australia) / 14.17; 2 / Ezekiel Lau / (Hawaii) / 12.83	Heat 3: 1 / Marc Lacomare / (France) / 8.87; 2 / Wade Carmichael / (Australia) / 8.63	Heat 4: 1 / Jack Freestone / (Australia) / 12.33; 2 / Julian Wilson / (Australia) / 10.33

Heat 5: 1 / Adrian Buchan / (Australia) / 10.00; 2 / Gabriel Medina / (Brazil) / 9.50	Heat 6: 1 / L. Fioravanti / (Italy) / 11.77; 2 / Seth Moniz / (Hawaii) / 8.83	Heat 7: 1 / Kolohe Andino / (United States) / 10.33; 2 / Yago Dora / (Brazil) / 6.00	Heat 8: 1 / Italo Ferreira / (Brazil) / 13.84; 2 / Michel Bourez / (France) / 8.06

=== Quarterfinals ===
Heat 1: 1 / Jérémy Florès / (France) / 14.40; 2 / Ryan Callinan / (Australia) / 13.17	Heat 2: 1 / Jack Freestone / (Australia) / 13.00; 2 / Marc Lacomare / (France) / 12.84	Heat 3: 1 / L. Fioravanti / (Italy) / 13.30; 2 / Adrian Buchan / (Australia) / 13.00	Heat 4: 1 / Italo Ferreira / (Brazil) / 13.93; 2 / Kolohe Andino / (United States) / 11.36

=== Semifinals ===
Heat 1: 1 / Jérémy Florès / (France) / 16.33; 2 / Jack Freestone / (Australia) / 4.73	Heat 2: 1 / Italo Ferreira / (Brazil) / 11.60; 2 / L. Fioravanti / (Italy) / 10.83

=== Final ===
Heat 1
1	Jérémy Florès	(France)	15.00
2	Italo Ferreira	(Brazil)	8.23
