= 2019 World Surf League =

Professional surfing league season

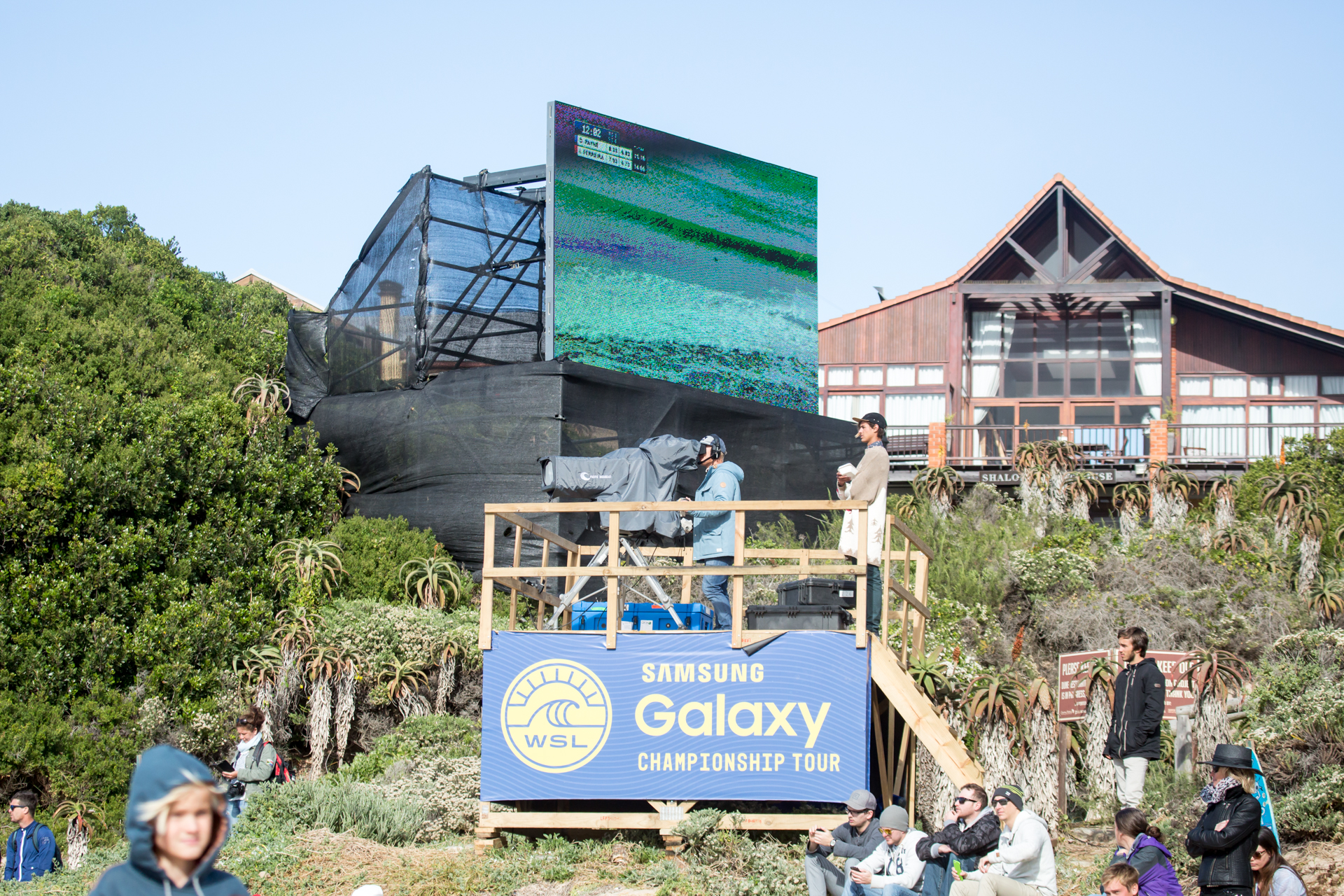
- Location: Australia, Indonesia, Brazil, South Africa, French Polynesia, The United States of America, France, Portugal
- Dates: 3 April 2019 – 20 December 2019

Champions
- Men: (Brazil) Italo Ferreira
- Women: (Hawaii) Carissa Moore

The 2019 World Surf League was the competition series hosted by the World Surf League, the global championship body for competitive surfing. The 2019 World Surf League consisted of the Championship Tour (shortboard tour), the Qualifying Series (shortboard and longboard), Big Wave Tour, Longboard Tour, Junior Tour, and other specialty tours and events such as the Vans Triple Crown.

The Annual World Surf League Champion Tour is a professional shortboarding surf tour run by the World Surf League (WSL), formerly known as the Association of Surfing Professionals (ASP) prior to 2014.

The Championship tour is divided by gender into the Men’s and Women’s championship series. The 2019 tour consisted of 11 Men’s events and 10 Women’s events. The placings from each event for each competitor are used to determine, at the conclusion of the tour, the overall female and male champions for 2019, referred to by the league as World Champions.

The 2019 tour began in April and ended in December, travelling to the global locations of Australia, Indonesia, Brazil, South Africa, America, France, Portugal, Hawaii and Tahiti. In 2019 the female world champion was Carissa Moore, from Hawaii, and the male world champion was Italo Ferreira, from Brazil.

== 2019 Men's Championship Tour ==
=== Quicksilver Pro ===
The Quicksilver Pro 2019 was held in the Gold Coast, Queensland at Coolangatta. The male competition was won by Brazilian surfer Italo Ferreria (Brazil), who beat competitor Kolohe Andino (USA) by 0.14ths.

=== Rip Curl Pro ===
The Rip Curl Pro was held at Bells Beach in Victoria, Australia from 17–27 April. It was won by John John Florence (Hawaii), defeating Filipe Toledo (Brazil).

=== Corona Bali Protected ===
The Corona Bali Protected was the third stop of the men's championship tour in 2019, taking place between 13–25 May in Bali, Indonesia. Kanoa Igarashi (Japan) won this event, defeating Jeremy Flores (France) in the final.

=== Margaret River Pro ===
The Margaret River Pro took place in Western Australia from 29 May to 4 June. John John Florence (Hawaii) defeated Kolohe Andino (USA) to win the event.

=== Rio Pro ===
The Oi Rio Pro took place in Saquarema, Rio De Janeiro from 20–23 June 2019. Filipe Toledo (Brazil) defeated Jordy Smith (South Africa) to win the event with a score in the final of 18.04.

=== J-Bay Open ===
The Corona Open J-Bay took place at Jeffery's Bay, South Africa, from the 9 to 19 July. Gabriel Medina (Brazil) defeated Italo Ferreia (Brazil) for the event win.

=== Tahiti Pro ===
The Tahiti Pro Teahupo'o took place at Teahupo'o in Tahiti, French Polynesia from 24–29 August. Owen Wright (Australia) defeated Gabriel Medina (Brazil) in the final, with a total score of 17.07.

=== Freshwater Pro ===
The Freshwater Pro was held from 19–24 September at the Surf Ranch, in Lemoore, California. Gabriel Medina (Brazil) won the event with a total score of 18.86, defeating Filipe Toledo (Brazil).

=== Quicksilver Pro France ===
The Quicksilver Pro France took place from 3 to 11 October at Capbreton, Hossegor and Seignosse, Landes, France. Jeremy Flores (France) won the event, defeating Italo Ferreria in the final.

=== RipCurl Pro Portugal ===
The MEO RipCurl Pro Portugal took place from 16–28 October at Supertubos, Peniche. Italo Ferreria (Brazil) defeated Jordy Smith (South Africa) in the final.

=== Pipe Masters ===
The Billabong Pipe Masters is the final event of the men's championship tour, taking place from 9–19 December in 2019. Italo Ferreria (Brazil) defeated Gabriel Medina (Brazil) in the final, while also securing the 2019 World Title.

=== Event results ===
| Round | Event | Men's champion | Men's runner-up |
|---|---|---|---|
| 1 | (Australia) Quiksilver Pro Gold Coast | (Brazil) Ítalo Ferreira | (United States) Kolohe Andino |
| 2 | (Australia) Rip Curl Pro | (Hawaii) John John Florence | (Brazil) Filipe Toledo |
| 3 | (Indonesia) Corona Bali Protected | (Japan) Kanoa Igarashi | (France) Jeremy Flores |
| 4 | (Australia) Margaret River Pro | (Hawaii) John John Florence | (United States) Kolohe Andino |
| 5 | (Brazil) Oi Rio Pro | (Brazil) Filipe Toledo | (South Africa) Jordy Smith |
| 6 | (South Africa) Corona Open J-Bay | (Brazil) Gabriel Medina | (Brazil) Ítalo Ferreira |
| 7 | (French Polynesia) Tahiti Pro Teahupo'o | (Australia) Owen Wright | (Brazil) Gabriel Medina |
| 8 | (United States) Freshwater Pro | (Brazil) Gabriel Medina | (Brazil) Filipe Toledo |
| 9 | Quicksilver Pro France | (France) Jeremy Flores | (Brazil) Ítalo Ferreira |
| 10 | MEO RipCurl Pro Portugal | (Brazil) Ítalo Ferreira | (South Africa) Jordy Smith |
| 11 | (Hawaii) Billabong Pipe Masters | (Brazil) Ítalo Ferreira | (Brazil) Gabriel Medina |

=== 2019 Men's Championship Tour Jeep Leaderboard ===
Points are awarded using the following structure:

| Position | 1st | 2nd | 3rd | 5th | 9th | 17th | 33rd | INJ | PAR | DNC |
|---|---|---|---|---|---|---|---|---|---|---|
| Points | 10.000 | 7.800 | 6.085 | 4.745 | 3.320 | 1.330 | 265 | 265 | 265 | 0 |

Point values are shown using European thousands separators; most English-speaking countries would write these numbers as 10,000 for first place, 7,800 for 2nd place, and so on.

| Ranking | +/- | Surfer | (Australia) WCT 1 (Details) | (Australia) WCT 2 (Details) | (Indonesia) WCT 3 (Details) | (Australia) WCT 4 (Details) | (Brazil) WCT 5 (Details) | (South Africa) WCT 6 (Details) | (French Polynesia) WCT 7 (Details) | (United States) WCT 8 (Details) | (France) WCT 9 (Details) | (Portugal) WCT 10 (Details) | (Hawaii) WCT 11 (Details) | Points |
|---|---|---|---|---|---|---|---|---|---|---|---|---|---|---|
| 1 | Steady | Italo Ferreira (BRA) | 1st | 5th | 17th | 5th | 17th | 2nd | 17th | 9th | 2nd | 1st | 1st | 59.740 |
| 2 | Steady | Gabriel Medina (BRA) | 5th | 5th | 17th | 17th | 5th | 1st | 2nd | 1st | 9th | 9th | 2nd | 56.475 |
| 3 | Steady | Jordy Smith (ZAF) | 3rd | 3rd | 17th | 5th | 2nd | 9th | 3rd | 5th | 9th | 2nd | 17th | 49.985 |
| 4 | Steady | Filipe Toledo (BRA) | 9th | 2nd | 5th | 17th | 1st | 3rd | 9th | 2nd | 17th | 5th | 17th | 49.145 |
| 5 | Steady | Kolohe Andino (USA) | 2nd | 17th | 5th | 2nd | 3rd | 3rd | 17th | 17th | 5th | 5th | 9th | 46.655 |
| 6 | Steady | Kanoa Igarashi (JPN) | 9th | 9th | 1st | 9th | 5th | 5th | 17th | 9th | 17th | 3rd | 17th | 40.185 |
| 7 | Steady | John John Florence (HAW) | 3rd | 1st | 17th | 1st | 5th | INJ | INJ | INJ | INJ | INJ | 5th | 37.700 |
| 8 | Steady | Kelly Slater (USA) | 33rd | 5th | 3rd | 9th | 9th | 9th | 17th | 9th | 17th | 9th | 3rd | 34.845 |
| 9 | Steady | Owen Wright (AUS) | 9th | 9th | 17th | 9th | 17th | 5th | 1st | 3rd | 17th | 17th | 17th | 34.780 |
| 10 | Steady | Jérémy Florès (FRA) | 17th | 9th | 2nd | 17th | 33rd | 17th | 5th | 17th | 1st | 17th | 33rd | 32.515 |
| 11 | Steady | Julian Wilson (AUS) | 17th | 17th | 9th | 3rd | 5th | 17th | 9th | 5th | 9th | 17th | 9th | 31.515 |
| 12 | Steady | Seth Moniz (HAW) | 5th | 9th | 17th | 5th | 17th | 17th | 3rd | 17th | 9th | 33rd | 9th | 29.525 |
| 13 | Steady | Michel Bourez (FRA) | 9th | 17th | 9th | 9th | 9th | 9th | 9th | 33rd | 9th | 17th | 5th | 29.315 |
| 14 | Steady | Ryan Callinan (AUS) | 17th | 3rd | 9th | 5th | 17th | 9th | 17th | 17th | 5th | 33rd | 17th | 27.535 |
| 14 | Steady | Jack Freestone (AUS) | 17th | 17th | 9th | 17th | 17th | 17th | 9th | 17th | 3rd | 5th | 5th | 27.535 |
| 16 | Steady | Griffin Colapinto (USA) | 17th | INJ | 17th | 17th | 9th | 17th | 9th | 3rd | 17th | 9th | 3rd | 27.450 |
| 17 | Steady | Caio Ibelli (BRA) | 33rd | 17th | 17th | 3rd | 17th | 17th | 5th | 17th | 17th | 3rd | 9th | 26.885 |
| 18 | Steady | Wade Carmichael (AUS) | 5th | 17th | 5th | 33rd | 9th | 17th | 17th | 9th | 9th | 9th | 17th | 26.760 |
| 19 | Steady | Adrian Buchan (AUS) | 17th | 17th | 5th | 33rd | 33rd | 5th | 17th | 5th | 5th | 17th | 17th | 25.630 |
| 20 | Steady | Conner Coffin (USA) | 5th | 9th | 9th | 9th | 17th | 17th | 17th | 17th | 17th | 9th | 17th | 23.345 |
| 20 | Steady | Peterson Crisanto (BRA) | 17th | 9th | 17th | 9th | 33rd | 9th | 17th | 33rd | 17th | 5th | 9th | 23.345 |
| 22 | Steady | Yago Dora (BRA) | 9th | 17th | 17th | 17th | 17th | 17th | 17th | 5th | 9th | 17th | 5th | 22.780 |
| 23 | Steady | Deivid Silva (BRA) | 17th | 9th | 17th | 17th | 9th | 9th | 9th | 9th | 33rd | 17th | 17th | 21.920 |
| 24 | Steady | Willian Cardoso (BRA) | 9th | 9th | 17th | 17th | 17th | 9th | 17th | 9th | 17th | 17th | 17th | 19.930 |
| 24 | Steady | Jesse Mendes (BRA) | 17th | 33rd | 9th | 17th | 9th | 33rd | 17th | 17th | 17th | 9th | 9th | 19.930 |
| 26 | Steady | Michael Rodrigues (BRA) | 17th | 17th | 3rd | 17th | 9th | 17th | 33rd | 33rd | 17th | 9th | 33rd | 19.640 |
| 27 | Steady | Sebastian Zietz (HAW) | 17th | PAR | 33rd | 9th | 17th | 5th | 17th | 9th | 33rd | 17th | 17th | 18.300 |
| 28 | Steady | Joan Duru (FRA) | 17th | 33rd | 9th | 17th | 9th | 17th | 9th | 17th | 17th | 17th | 17th | 17.940 |
| 28 | Steady | Ezekiel Lau (HAW) | 17th | 17th | 33rd | 17th | 17th | 9th | 17th | 9th | 9th | 33rd | 17th | 17.940 |
| 30 | Steady | Soli Bailey (AUS) | 17th | 17th | 33rd | 17th | 17th | 17th | 17th | 17th | 17th | 9th | 9th | 15.950 |
| 31 | Steady | Leonardo Fioravanti (ITA) | 33rd | 17th | 9th | 17th | INJ | INJ | INJ | INJ | 3rd | 17th | 33rd | 14.455 |
| 32 | Steady | Jadson André (BRA) | 33rd | 17th | 17th | 17th | 17th | 33rd | 5th | 17th | 33rd | 17th | 17th | 14.320 |
| 33 | Steady | Ricardo Christie (NZL) | 17th | 17th | 17th | 17th | 17th | 17th | 17th | 17th | 33rd | 33rd | 9th | 13.960 |
| 34 | Steady | Frederico Morais (PRT) | – | – | – | 33rd | 3rd | 17th | 33rd | – | 17th | 17th | 33rd | 10.870 |
| 35 | Steady | Adriano de Souza (BRA) | INJ | INJ | INJ | INJ | 17th | 17th | 5th | INJ | INJ | INJ | INJ | 8.995 |
| 36 | Steady | Mikey Wright (AUS) | 9th | 17th | 17th | INJ | INJ | INJ | INJ | INJ | INJ | INJ | INJ | 7.570 |
| 37 | Steady | Jacob Willcox (AUS) | – | 5th | 33rd | 33rd | – | – | – | – | – | – | – | 5.275 |
| 38 | Steady | Marc Lacomare (FRA) | – | – | – | – | – | – | – | – | 5th | – | – | 4.745 |
| 39 | Steady | Reef Heazlewood (AUS) | 9th | 17th | – | – | – | – | – | – | – | – | – | 4.650 |
| 40 | Steady | Jack Robinson (AUS) | – | – | – | 9th | – | – | – | – | – | – | – | 3.320 |
| 40 | Steady | Kauli Vaast (FRA) | – | – | – | – | – | – | 9th | – | – | – | – | 3.320 |
| 42 | Steady | Crosby Colapinto (USA) | – | – | – | – | – | – | – | 17th | – | 17th | – | 2.660 |
| 43 | Steady | Mateus Herdy (BRA) | 17th | – | – | – | INJ | – | – | 33rd | – | – | – | 1.860 |
| 44 | Steady | Jorgann Couzinet (FRA) | – | – | – | – | – | 33rd | – | – | 17th | – | – | 1.595 |
| 45 | Steady | Rio Waida (INA) | – | – | 17th | – | – | – | – | – | – | – | – | 1.330 |
| 45 | Steady | Krystian Kymerson (BRA) | – | – | – | – | 17th | – | – | – | – | – | – | 1.330 |
| 45 | Steady | Michael February (ZAF) | – | – | – | – | – | 17th | – | – | – | – | – | 1.330 |
| 45 | Steady | Barron Mamiya (HAW) | – | – | – | – | – | – | – | 17th | – | – | – | 1.330 |
| 45 | Steady | Kade Matson (USA) | – | – | – | – | – | – | – | 17th | – | – | – | 1.330 |
| 45 | Steady | Jett Schilling (USA) | – | – | – | – | – | – | – | 17th | – | – | – | 1.330 |
| 45 | Steady | Marco Mignot (FRA) | – | – | – | – | – | – | – | – | 17th | – | – | 1.330 |
| 45 | Steady | Vasco Ribeiro (PRT) | – | – | – | – | – | – | – | – | – | 17th | – | 1.330 |
| 45 | Steady | Miguel Blanco (PRT) | – | – | – | – | – | – | – | – | – | 17th | – | 1.330 |
| 45 | Steady | Imaikalani deVault (HAW) | – | – | – | – | – | – | – | – | – | – | 17th | 1.330 |
| 45 | Steady | Billy Kemper (HAW) | – | – | – | – | – | – | – | – | – | – | 17th | 1.330 |
| 56 | Steady | Harrison Mann (AUS) | – | 33rd | – | – | – | – | – | – | – | – | – | 265 |
| 56 | Steady | Xavier Huxtable (AUS) | – | 33rd | – | – | – | – | – | – | – | – | – | 265 |
| 56 | Steady | Alex Ribeiro (BRA) | – | – | – | – | 33rd | – | – | – | – | – | – | 265 |
| 56 | Steady | Beyrick De Vries (ZAF) | – | – | – | – | – | 33rd | – | – | – | – | – | 265 |
| 56 | Steady | Tyler Newton (HAW) | – | – | – | – | – | – | 33rd | – | – | – | – | 265 |
| 56 | Steady | Matahi Drollet (PYF) | – | – | – | – | – | – | 33rd | – | – | – | – | 265 |

- Championship Tour surfers best 9 of 11 results are combined to equal their final point total.
- Tournament results discarded

Legend

Champion
Men's QS 2020
Two worst results

== 2019 Women's Championship Tour ==
=== Boost Mobile Pro Gold Coast ===
The Boost Mobile Pro Gold Coast was the first event in the women's championship tour in 2019. It was held on the Gold Coast, and Caroline Marks (USA) defeated Carissa Moore (Hawaii) for the event win.

=== Rip Curl Pro Bells Beach ===
The Rip Curl Pro Bells Beach was held from 17–27 April, at Bells Beach in Victoria, Australia. Courtney Conologue (USA) won the event, defeating Malia Manuel (Hawaii) in the final.

=== Corona Bali Protected ===
The Corona Bali Protected was held in Bali, Indonesia from 13–25 May. Stephanie Gilmore (Australia) won the event, defeating Sally Fitzgibbons (Australia) with a score of 16.83.

=== Margaret River Pro ===
The 2019 Margaret River Pro was held at Margaret River Main Break, in Western Australia, from 29 May- 9 June. Lakey Peterson (Australia) won the event, defeating Tatiana Weston Webb (Brazil) in the final.

=== Oi Rio Pro ===
The Oi Rio Pro took place in Saquarema, Rio De Janeiro from 20–28 June 2019. Sally Fitzgibbons (Australia) won this event, defeating Carissa Moore (Hawaii) in the final.

=== Corona Open J-Bay ===
The Corona Open J-Bay was held from 9–22 July at Jefferys Bay, South Africa. Carissa Moore (Hawaii) defeated Lakey Peterson (USA) in the final to win the event.

=== Freshwater Pro ===
The Freshwater Pro was held from 19–21 September at the Surf Ranch, in Lemoore, California. Lakey Peterson (USA) was the winner of this event.

=== Roxy Pro France ===
The Roxy Pro France was held from 3–13 October at Capbreton, Hossegor, Seignosse, and Landes in France. Carissa Moore (Hawaii) defeated Caroline Marks (USA) to win the event.

=== MEO RipCurl Pro Portugal ===
The MEO RipCurl Pro Portugal was held from 16–28 October in Peniche, Portugal. Caroline Marks (USA) defeated Lakey Peterson (USA) to win the event.

=== lululemon Maui Pro ===
The Maui Pro was the penultimate event of the women's championship tour in 2019. It was held from 25 November to 6 December in Honolulu Bay, in Maui, Hawaii. Stephanie Gilmore (Australia) defeated Tyler Wright (Australia) to win the event.

=== Event results ===
| Round | Event | Men's champion | Men's runner-up |
|---|---|---|---|
| 1 | (Australia) Boost Mobile Pro Gold Coast | (United States) Caroline Marks | (Hawaii) Carissa Moore |
| 2 | (Australia) Rip Curl Pro Bells Beach | (United States) Courtney Conlogue | (Hawaii) Malia Manuel |
| 3 | (Indonesia) Corona Bali Protected | (Australia) Stephanie Gilmore | (Australia) Sally Fitzgibbons |
| 4 | (Australia) Margaret River Pro | (United States) Lakey Peterson | (Brazil) Tatiana Weston-Webb |
| 5 | (Brazil) Oi Rio Pro | (Australia) Sally Fitzgibbons | (Hawaii) Carissa Moore |
| 6 | (South Africa) Corona Open J-Bay | (Hawaii) Carissa Moore | (United States) Lakey Peterson |
| 7 | (United States) Freshwater Pro | (United States) Lakey Peterson | (France) Johanne Defay |
| 8 | Roxy Pro France | (Hawaii) Carissa Moore | (United States) Caroline Marks |
| 9 | MEO Rip Curl Pro Portugal | (United States) Caroline Marks | (United States) Lakey Peterson |
| 10 | (Hawaii) lululemon Maui Pro | (Australia) Stephanie Gilmore | (Australia) Tyler Wright |

=== 2019 Women's Championship Tour Jeep Leaderboard ===
Points are awarded using the following structure:

| Position | 1st | 2nd | 3rd | 5th | 9th | 17th | INJ | DNC |
|---|---|---|---|---|---|---|---|---|
| Points | 10.000 | 7.800 | 6.085 | 4.745 | 2.610 | 1.045 | 1.045 | 0 |

Point values are shown using European thousands separators; most English-speaking countries would write these numbers as 10,000 for first place, 7,800 for 2nd place, and so on.

| Ranking | +/- | Surfer | (Australia) WCT 1 (Details) | (Australia) WCT 2 (Details) | (Indonesia) WCT 3 (Details) | (Australia) WCT 4 (Details) | (Brazil) WCT 5 (Details) | (South Africa) WCT 6 (Details) | (United States) WCT 7 (Details) | (France) WCT 8 (Details) | (Portugal) WCT 9 (Details) | (Hawaii) WCT 10 (Details) | Points |
|---|---|---|---|---|---|---|---|---|---|---|---|---|---|
| 1 | Steady | Carissa Moore (HAW) | 2nd | 5th | 5th | 3rd | 2nd | 1st | 3rd | 1st | 3rd | 3rd | 59.940 |
| 2 | Steady | Caroline Marks (USA) | 1st | 3rd | 9th | 5th | 9th | 3rd | 3rd | 2nd | 1st | 5th | 55.545 |
| 3 | Steady | Lakey Peterson (USA) | 9th | 3rd | 9th | 1st | 5th | 2nd | 1st | 3rd | 2nd | 9th | 55.125 |
| 4 | Steady | Stephanie Gilmore (AUS) | 5th | 5th | 1st | 5th | 3rd | 5th | 5th | 17th | 5th | 1st | 49.810 |
| 5 | Steady | Sally Fitzgibbons (AUS) | 3rd | 9th | 2nd | 3rd | 1st | 5th | 5th | 5th | 5th | 5th | 48.950 |
| 6 | Steady | Tatiana Weston-Webb (BRA) | 5th | 9th | 9th | 2nd | 5th | 9th | 5th | 5th | 3rd | 3rd | 41.560 |
| 7 | Steady | Courtney Conlogue (USA) | 9th | 1st | 5th | 5th | 5th | 5th | 5th | 5th | 9th | INJ | 41.080 |
| 8 | Steady | Johanne Defay (FRA) | 5th | 9th | 9th | 9th | 9th | 5th | 2nd | 3rd | 5th | 5th | 38.085 |
| 9 | Steady | Malia Manuel (HAW) | 3rd | 2nd | 9th | 9th | 9th | 3rd | 9th | 5th | 17th | 9th | 35.155 |
| 10 | Steady | Nikki Van Dijk (AUS) | 9th | 9th | 3rd | 9th | 17th | 9th | 9th | 9th | 5th | 5th | 28.625 |
| 11 | Steady | Brisa Hennessy (CRI) | 9th | 5th | 3rd | 5th | 17th | 9th | 17th | 9th | 9th | 17th | 27.060 |
| 12 | Steady | Silvana Lima (BRA) | INJ | INJ | 5th | 9th | 5th | 9th | 9th | 9th | 9th | 9th | 25.150 |
| 13 | Steady | Bronte Macaulay (AUS) | 9th | 9th | 5th | 9th | 9th | 9th | 9th | 17th | 9th | 9th | 23.015 |
| 13 | Steady | Coco Ho (HAW) | 9th | 5th | 9th | 9th | 9th | INJ | 9th | 9th | 9th | 9th | 23.015 |
| 15 | Steady | Keely Andrew (AUS) | 17th | 17th | 9th | 9th | 3rd | 9th | 9th | 9th | 9th | 17th | 22.790 |
| 16 | Steady | Paige Hareb (NZL) | 17th | 17th | 9th | 9th | 9th | 9th | 9th | 9th | 9th | 9th | 20.880 |
| 17 | Steady | Macy Callaghan (AUS) | 9th | 9th | 17th | 17th | 9th | 9th | 17th | 9th | 9th | 9th | 19.315 |
| 18 | Steady | Tyler Wright (AUS) | INJ | INJ | INJ | INJ | INJ | INJ | INJ | INJ | INJ | 2nd | 15.115 |
| 19 | Steady | Sage Erickson (USA) | 5th | 9th | – | – | – | 17th | – | – | – | – | 8.400 |
| 20 | Steady | Isabella Nichols (AUS) | 9th | – | – | – | – | – | – | – | – | – | 2.610 |
| 20 | Steady | Kobie Enright (AUS) | – | 9th | – | – | – | – | – | – | – | – | 2.610 |
| 20 | Steady | Taina Hinckel (BRA) | – | – | – | – | 9th | – | – | – | – | – | 2.610 |
| 20 | Steady | Gabriela Bryan (HAW) | – | – | – | – | – | – | 9th | – | – | – | 2.610 |
| 20 | Steady | Vahine Fierro (FRA) | – | – | – | – | – | – | – | 9th | – | – | 2.610 |
| 20 | Steady | Summer Macedo (HAW) | – | – | – | – | – | – | – | – | – | 9th | 2.610 |
| 26 | Steady | Kailani Johnson (INA) | – | – | 17th | – | – | – | – | – | – | – | 1.045 |
| 26 | Steady | Mia McCarthy (AUS) | – | – | – | 17th | – | – | – | – | – | – | 1.045 |
| 26 | Steady | Bianca Buitendag (ZAF) | – | – | – | – | – | 17th | – | – | – | – | 1.045 |
| 26 | Steady | Alana Blanchard (HAW) | – | – | – | – | – | – | – | – | 17th | – | 1.045 |

- Championship Tour surfers best 8 of 10 results are combined to equal their final point total.
- Tournament results discarded

Legend

Champion
Women's QS 2020
two worst results

== Qualifying series ==
=== 2019 Men's Qualifying Series ===
| Position | 1st | 2nd | 3rd–4th | 5th–8th | 9th |

| Ranking | +/- | Surfer | Events | | | | | Points |
| Ranking | +/- | Surfer | 1 | 2 | 3 | 4 | 5 | Points |
|---|---|---|---|---|---|---|---|---|
| 1 | Steady | Frederico Morais (PRT) | 10.000 | 6.000 | 3.700 | 3.700 | 3.000 | 26.400 |
| 2 | Steady | Jadson André (BRA) | 6.500 | 6.000 | 4.500 | 4.500 | 2.300 | 23.800 |
| 3 | Steady | Yago Dora (BRA) | 10.000 | 6.500 | 4.500 | 1.100 | 1.100 | 23.200 |
| 4 | Steady | Matthew McGillivray (ZAF) | 6.700 | 5.200 | 5.200 | 3.800 | 1.680 | 22.580 |
| 5 | Steady | Jack Robinson (AUS) | 10.000 | 3.700 | 3.550 | 3.000 | 1.680 | 21.930 |
| 6 | Steady | Alex Ribeiro (BRA) | 6.500 | 6.000 | 3.700 | 3.700 | 1.680 | 21.580 |
| 7 | Steady | Miguel Pupo (BRA) | 10.000 | 3.700 | 3.550 | 2.200 | 1.550 | 21.000 |
| 8 | Steady | Ethan Ewing (AUS) | 6.700 | 6.300 | 5.200 | 1.100 | 1.100 | 20.400 |
| 9 | Steady | Connor O'Leary (AUS) | 5.200 | 5.200 | 3.600 | 3.000 | 2.650 | 19.650 |
| 10 | Steady | Deivid Silva (BRA) | 10.000 | 3.700 | 2.300 | 1.550 | 1.100 | 18.650 |
| 11 | Steady | Morgan Cibilic (AUS) | 6.500 | 3.700 | 3.600 | 2.200 | 2.100 | 18.100 |
| 12 | Steady | Stuart Kennedy (AUS) | 8.000 | 5.100 | 2.650 | 1.125 | 1.100 | 17.975 |
| 13 | Steady | Jake Marshall (USA) | 8.000 | 3.550 | 2.650 | 2.200 | 1.550 | 17.950 |
| 14 | Steady | Barron Mamiya (HAW) | 5.200 | 3.800 | 3.700 | 2.650 | 2.250 | 17.600 |
| 15 | Steady | Jorgann Couzinet (FRA) | 6.500 | 5.200 | 2.250 | 1.680 | 1.680 | 17.310 |
| 16 | Steady | Jack Freestone (AUS) | 8.000 | 3.800 | 3.700 | 1.100 | 700 | 17.300 |
| 17 | Steady | Ezekiel Lau (HAW) | 8.000 | 3.700 | 2.300 | 2.250 | 1.000 | 17.250 |
| 18 | Steady | Samuel Pupo (BRA) | 10.000 | 3.700 | 1.550 | 1.050 | 840 | 17.140 |

Legend

Men's CT 2020

=== 2019 Women's Qualifying Series ===
| Position | 1st | 2nd | 3rd–4th | 5th–8th | 9th |

| Ranking | +/- | Surfer | Events | | | | | Points |
| Ranking | +/- | Surfer | 1 | 2 | 3 | 4 | 5 | Points |
|---|---|---|---|---|---|---|---|---|
| 1 | Steady | Isabella Nichols (AUS) | 6.000 | 5.200 | 4.500 | 4.500 | 3.700 | 23.900 |
| 2 | Steady | Bronte Macaulay (AUS) | 8.000 | 5.200 | 3.550 | 2.650 | 2.650 | 22.050 |
| 3 | Steady | Sage Erickson (USA) | 10.000 | 5.200 | 3.000 | 700 | 700 | 19.600 |
| 4 | Steady | Tatiana Weston-Webb (BRA) | 6.500 | 4.500 | 3.700 | 2.650 | 1.050 | 18.400 |
| 5 | Steady | Brisa Hennessy (CRI) | 6.500 | 3.700 | 3.550 | 1.550 | 1.050 | 16.350 |
| 6 | Steady | Macy Callaghan (AUS) | 6.500 | 4.500 | 2.200 | 1.050 | 650 | 14.900 |
| 7 | Steady | Keely Andrew (AUS) | 3.700 | 3.700 | 2.650 | 2.650 | 1.550 | 14.250 |
| 8 | Steady | Amuro Tsuzuki (JPN) | 10.000 | 1.680 | 1.000 | 700 | 700 | 14.080 |
| 9 | Steady | Caroline Marks (USA) | 5.200 | 3.550 | 3.000 | 1.550 | 700 | 14.000 |
| 10 | Steady | Alyssa Spencer (USA) | 3.700 | 3.700 | 2.650 | 2.250 | 1.680 | 13.980 |
| 11 | Steady | Zahli Kelly (AUS) | 3.700 | 3.550 | 3.000 | 1.550 | 1.550 | 13.350 |

Legend

Women's CT 2020

== Olympic qualification ==
For the first time in Olympic history surfing will be included in the Tokyo 2020 Olympics. The WSL 2019 Tour, in conjunction with other events, will be used for Olympic qualification for the 2020 Olympics.

In an agreement reached by the International Surfing Association and the WSL, it was decided that of the 40 places in the Olympic games, 20 would be determined from the ISA World Surfing games, 18 from the WSL (10 men 8 women) and the remaining 2 for the host nation.

=== 2020 Tokyo Olympics ===
The following surfers qualified for the 2020 Tokyo Olympics through the WSL;

Men
| Rank | Name |
|---|---|
| 1 | Ítalo Ferreira (BRA) |
| 2 | Gabriel Medina (BRA) |
| 3 | Jordy Smith (RSA) |
| 5 | Kolohe Andino (USA)^{1} |
| 6 | Kanoa Igarashi (JPN) |
| 7 | John John Florence (USA)^{1} |
| 9 | Owen Wright (AUS) |
| 10 | Jérémy Florès (FRA) |
| 11 | Julian Wilson (AUS) |
| 13 | Michel Bourez (FRA) |

^{1} Represented Hawaii in the 2019 WSL, Qualified to represent the United States at the 2020 Summer Olympics.

Women
| Rank | Name |
|---|---|
| 1 | Carissa Moore (USA)^{1} |
| 2 | Caroline Marks (USA) |
| 4 | Stephanie Gilmore (AUS) |
| 5 | Sally Fitzgibbons (AUS) |
| 6 | Tatiana Weston-Webb (BRA) |
| 8 | Johanne Defay (FRA) |
| 11 | Brisa Hennessy (CRC) |
| 12 | Silvana Lima (BRA) |

^{1} Represented Hawaii in the 2019 WSL, Qualified to represent the United States at the 2020 Summer Olympics.

== Changes to 2019 season ==
=== Competition format ===
The competition format of the 2019 Championship Tour was changed from previous years. In 2019, all competitors were to compete in a Seeding Round. From this seeding round, the two highest scoring surfers in each heat advance to round of 32, and the lowest placed surfer competes in an elimination round. In the elimination round heats, the top two surfers from each heat progress to the round of 32, while the losing four are eliminated. A single elimination format is then used from the Round of 32, with only the heat winner advancing.

=== Prize money ===
2018 saw 36 Male surfers compete for $607,800 across the tour, while the 18 women on tour were competing for $303,900. In individual events such as the 2018 RipCurl pro, the Male winner Italo Ferreira was awarded $100,000 while the female winner, Stephanie Gilmore, was awarded $65,000. The WSL announced on 5 September 2018 that female and male surfers, from the 2019 tour onwards, would receive equal prize money.

This was partnered with three initiatives by the WSL to elevate and enhance equality in female surfing, including; increased marketing of the women’s tour, a "local community engagement program for girls around the world" structured around the world tour events, and "a monthly content series" about the history of female surfing. This change has been recognised as a "wider push to challenge gender norms and improve the status of women across sport industries globally". An article on the topic found that "female surfers will likely be encouraged to pursue surfing as a professional sport, knowing that the financial cost of their attempts to reach the championship tour will be less daunting" as while professional tour surfers are often supported by sponsors and investors, it is the women on the qualifying tour who must fund their own efforts to go professional.

This has further been recognised as part of ongoing cultural change with regards to gender equality and social justice not only in sport but in the global community, with it argued that "the voices and experiences of athletes" form critical part of progressive movement. Kelly Slater stated that "the women on the tour deserve this change. I'm so proud that surfing is choosing to lead sports in equality and fairness. The female WSL athletes are equally committed to their craft as the male athletes and should be paid the same. Surfing has always been a pioneering sport, and this serves as an example of that." Stephanie Gilmore stated "the prize money is fantastic, but the message means even more. From the moment current ownership became involved, the situation for the women surfers has been transformed for the better in every way", and that she hoped this change would serve "as a model for other sports, global organizations and society as a whole".

=== WSL Pure ===
WSL Pure is the philanthropic branch of the WSL, focusing on ocean health and sustainability. The WSL Pure campaign made three commitments to be completed by the end of 2019.

==== Commitment to eliminate single use plastic ====
The WSL pledged to remove the usage of single-serve plastics from their events by the end of 2019 in light of their impact on the marine environment. This is due to the breakdown of these single use plastics into microparticles, which bioaccumulate, shown in studies that found 83% of the worlds drinking water is contaminated with microplastic.

==== Commitment to coast environment protection ====
The WSL further made the commitment to protecting the environments where they hold events. The WSL stated that from trampling over sand dunes, to sunscreen bleaching reefs, wherever we travel, humans leave their mark and our coastal communities are continually feeling this pressure”. They aim to alleviate and help mitigate this human impact. This includes protecting dunes, ensuring adequate trash removal, the use of reef-safe sunscreen, following local instruction to protect sensitive habitats and donating to local organisations.

== See also ==
- 2019 ISA World Surfing Games
