= Freshwater Pro 2019 =

Freshwater Pro
- Venue: Surf Ranch
- Location: Lemoore, California, United States
- Dates: 19 to 21 September 2019
- Competitors: 36

Medalists
gold medal	Gabriel Medina	Brazil
silver medal	Filipe Toledo	Brazil

The Freshwater Pro 2019 was the eighth event of the Men's Championship Tour in the 2019 World Surf League. It took place from 19 to 21 September at the Surf Ranch in Lemoore, California, and was contested by 36 surfers.

In the final, Brazil's Gabriel Medina scored 18.86 to win the 14th Championship Tour event of his career, ahead of fellow Brazilian Filipe Toledo.
