= Paige Hareb =

New Zealand surfer

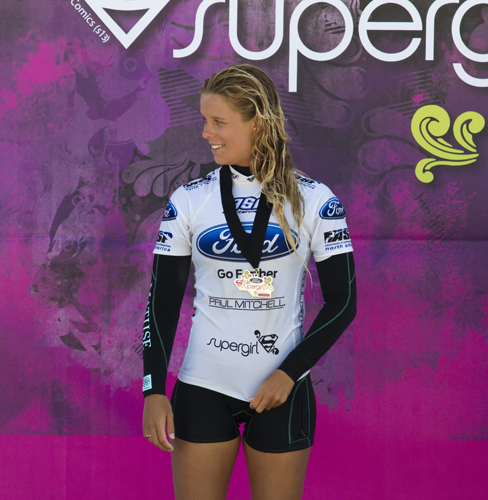
- Paige Hareb wins an award at the 2013 Supergirl Pro.

Personal information
- Born: 6 June 1990 (age 36) New Plymouth Base Hospital, New Zealand
- Height: 5 ft 5 in (165 cm)
- Weight: 58 kg (128 lb)
- Website: paigehareb.com

Surfing career
- Sport: Surfing
- Best year: 2009 – Ranked 8th on the ASP Women's World Tour
- Career earnings: $141,380.00
- Sponsors: DHL, Arial 7 Headphones, Gull New Zealand, Seven.T Surf, Subaru, FCS Fins, Gorilla Grip, Mt. Woodgee Surfboards, Sunbreaker Optical.

Surfing specifications
- Stance: Goofy
- Shaper: Wayne McKewan

Paige Frances Hareb (born 6 June 1990) is a professional surfer from Ōakura Beach, New Zealand. In December 2008 she became the first New Zealand woman to qualify for the ASP Women's World Tour.

She debuted on the ASP World Tour in December 2008 at the Billabong Pro in Hawaii where she won her second round heat, beating world no.2 Peru's Sofia Mulanovich. In the third round she was beaten by World Champion Stephanie Gilmore.

In her rookie year of the 2009 World Tour she reached the semi-finals of the Roxy Pro in Coolangatta, Australia before being beaten by eventual winner, Gilmore.

Hareb was 2009 Taranaki Sportsperson of the Year.

Hareb placed 3rd in the April 2012 Dow Agro Sciences Pro Tournament, in New Plymouth In 2022 Hareb picked up her first national title as part of a successful campaign for Taranaki surfers.

Hareb also plays association football with Moturoa AFC in the New Zealand Women's Central League.

== Surfing career highlights ==
- 2022 Winner National Surfing Championships Open Women's
- 2013 2nd Paul Mitchel Supergirl Pro
- 2012 2nd Paul Mitchel Supergirl Pro
- 2012 3rd Dow Agro Sciences Pro Tournament
- 2012 2nd Swatch Girls Pro France
- 2012 10th ASP World Tour
- 2010 9th ASP World Tour
- 2009 8th ASP World Tour
