= Willian Cardoso =

Brazilian surfer (born 1986)

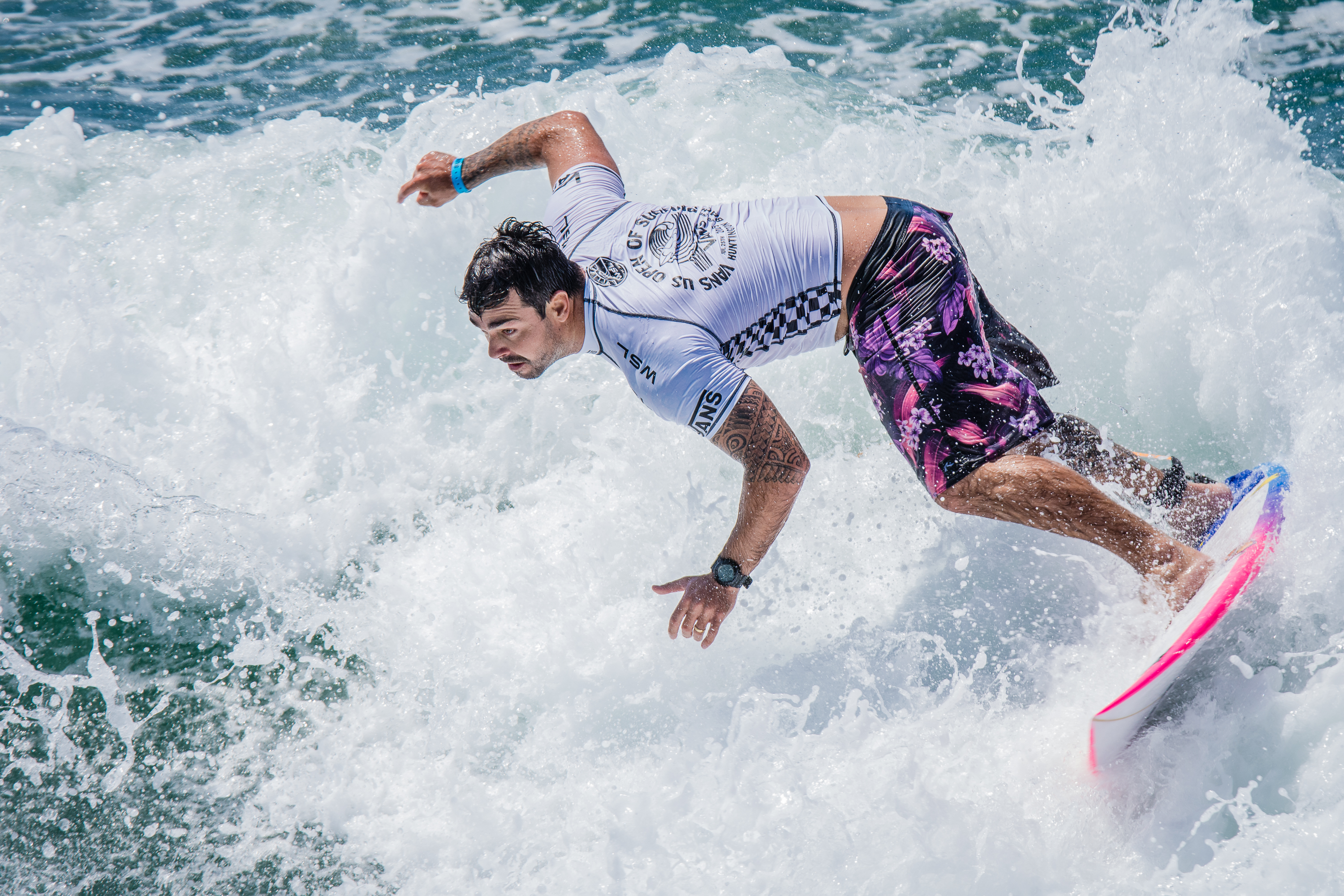
Cardoso in 2015

William Cardoso (born February 8, 1986) is a Brazilian professional surfer.

A native of Balneário Camboriú, Cardoso participated in 12 qualifying seasons of the World Surf League. He passed the qualifying season in 2017, which was supposed to be his final year surfing professionally. He participated in the 2017 World Surf League, and in 2018, became champion of the men's Uluwatu CT event.

At 180 cm (5 ft 11 in) and 95 kilograms (209 lb), Cardoso is noted for his build and 'powerful' surfing style.

Cardoso is the favorite surfer of rapper Desiigner, who has written some of his lyrics on him.
