= Seth Moniz =

American professional surfer

Personal information
- Born: September 9, 1997 (age 28) Honolulu, Oahu, Hawaii
- Height: 5 ft 7 in (1.70 m)
- Weight: 149 lb (68 kg)

Surfing career
- Sport: Surfing
- Best year: 2019 – Ranked No. 12 WSL CT World Tour
- Major achievements: WSL Championship Tour event wins: 1; 2019 WSL Rookie of the Year

Surfing specifications
- Stance: Regular

Seth Moniz (born September 9, 1997) is an American professional surfer from Hawaii, who is in the World Surf League.

== Career ==
Seth began his career on the Junior Tour in 2013, winning major Tour events. In the 2018 Qualifying Series season he placed 3rd and qualified for the 2019 CT for the first time in his career. In his rookie season, Seth had the best finish of his career, finishing in 12th place, winning the 2019 WSL Rookie of the Year.

From his rookie season until 2024, Seth remained in every season on the CT, but only had a 19th place as his best placing, in 2024. Seth's high point on the CT was when he reached his first final, at Billabong Pro Pipeline in 2022, when he was defeated by the legend and 11-time world champion Kelly Slater.

== Career victories ==
WCT Wins
Year	Event	Venue	Country
2026	Outerknown Tahiti Pro	Teahupo'o, Tahiti	French Polynesia

Juniors Wins
Year	Event	Venue	Country
2015	Vans Pro Junior	Virginia Beach, Virginia	United States
2015	Sunset Beach Pro Junior	Sunset Beach, Oahu	Hawaii
2014	North Shore Surf Shop Pipe Pro Junior	Banzai Pipeline, Oahu	Hawaii

== Family ==
Seth is the youngest child in the Moniz family, son of Tony and Tammy and his brothers Micah, Kelia, Isaiah and Joshua.
