= Deivid Silva =

Brazilian surfer

Personal information
- Born: February 10, 1995 (age 31) Guarujá, SP, Brazil
- Height: 5 ft 7 in (1.70 m)
- Weight: 149 lb (68 kg)

Surfing career
- Sport: Surfing
- Best year: 2021 – Ranked No. 14 WSL CT World Tour
- Sponsors: Slater Designs, Wet Dreams, Balloon Co., Silverbay

Surfing specifications
- Stance: Goofy

Deivid Silva (born February 10, 1995) better known as DVD, is a Brazilian professional surfer who is in the World Surf League.

== Career ==
Silva competed in his first events in the CT as a wildcard in the Oi Rio Pro stage in 2016 and 2018. In 2018 he came in seventh place in the qualifying series and got the spot to compete in the CT as a starter for the first time in his career. In 2019 he ranked 23rd place and falling into the mid-season cutoff.

In 2021, Silva was again at CT and experienced his best moment, reaching the final of the penultimate event of the season the Corona Open Mexico, for the first time in his career. He was defeated by Australian Jack Robinson.

Silva had his biggest victory in professional Surfing when he won the EDP Vissla Ericeira Pro stage in Portugal in the 2023 Challenger Series, beating American Jake Marshall. He also competed in the 2022 and 2024 CT but did not make it past the half-season cutoff.

== Career Victories ==
WSL Challenger Series Wins
Year	Event	Venue	Country
2023	EDP Vissla Ericeira Pro	Ribeira D'Ilhas, Ericeira	Portugal
WQS Wins
Year	Event	Venue	Country
2019	Ballito Pro	Ballito, KwaZulu-Natal	South Africa
2018	Vissla Sydney Surf Pro	Manly Beach, NSW	Australia
2017	Hang Loose São Sebastião Pro	Maresias, São Paulo	Brazil
2017	South to South pres Itacare Surf & Sound Festival	Itacaré, Bahia	Brazil
2017	Anfaplace Pro Casablanca	Ain Diab, Casablanca	Morocco
2016	Quiksilver Pro Casablanca	Ain Diab, Casablanca	Morocco
2015	Red Nose Pro15 Florianópolis SC	Florianópolis, Santa Catarina	Brazil
2014	Hainan Classic	Hainan Island, Hainan Province	China
Juniors Wins
Year	Event	Venue	Country
2015	Rip Curl Pro Junior Series San Bartolo	San Bartolo, Lima	Peru
2015	Hunter Business Boardriders Pro Junior	Newcastle, NSW	Australia
2014	Red Nose Pro Junior	Baía Formosa, Rio Grande do Norte	Brazil
2012	Surf Eco Festival	Salvador, Bahia	Brazil
