= Ryan Callinan =

Australian professional surfer (born 1992)

Personal information
- Born: 27 May 1992 (age 34) Newcastle, New South Wales, Australia
- Height: 6 ft 1 in (1.85 m)
- Weight: 176 lb (80 kg)

Surfing career
- Sport: Surfing
- Best year: 2023 – Ranked No. 10 WSL CT World Tour

Surfing specifications
- Stance: Goofy

Ryan Callinan (born 27 May 1992, in Newcastle, New South Wales) is an Australian professional surfer.

== Surfing career ==
Callinan secured his spot on the 2016 CT by finishing 10th in the 2015 Qualifying Series. In his CT debut, he finished only 34th place. He returned in 2018 as a replacement in the French leg of the Quiksilver Pro France and reached his first final, losing to compatriot Julian Wilson. Callinan won 2 QS stages in the same year and finished 4th in the rankings, returning to the Championship Tour.

Callinan competed in the 2019 and 2021 CT seasons, finishing in the middle of the rankings. In the 2022, Callinan suffered an injury and poor results, finishing 35th and falling into the mid-season cut. In the same year, competing in the access division, the Challenger Series, he reached 2 finals and finished the season in 2nd place in the rankings, requalifying for the CT again. Callinan reached his second CT final in 2023, at the Rip Curl Pro Bells Beach being defeated by compatriot Ethan Ewing. He finished the year in 10th place, his best CT performance. Callinan had a quiet 2024 season and qualified again for the 2025 CT season.

== Career victories ==
WQS Wins
Year	Event	Venue	Country
2018	EDP Billabong Pro Ericeira	Ribeira D'Ilhas, Ericeira	Portugal
2018	Ichinomiya Chiba Open	Ichinomiya, Chiba	Japan
Juniors Wins
Year	Event	Venue	Country
2011	Fantastic Noodles Pro Junior	Victor Harbor, South Australia	Australia
