= Joan Duru =

French surfer

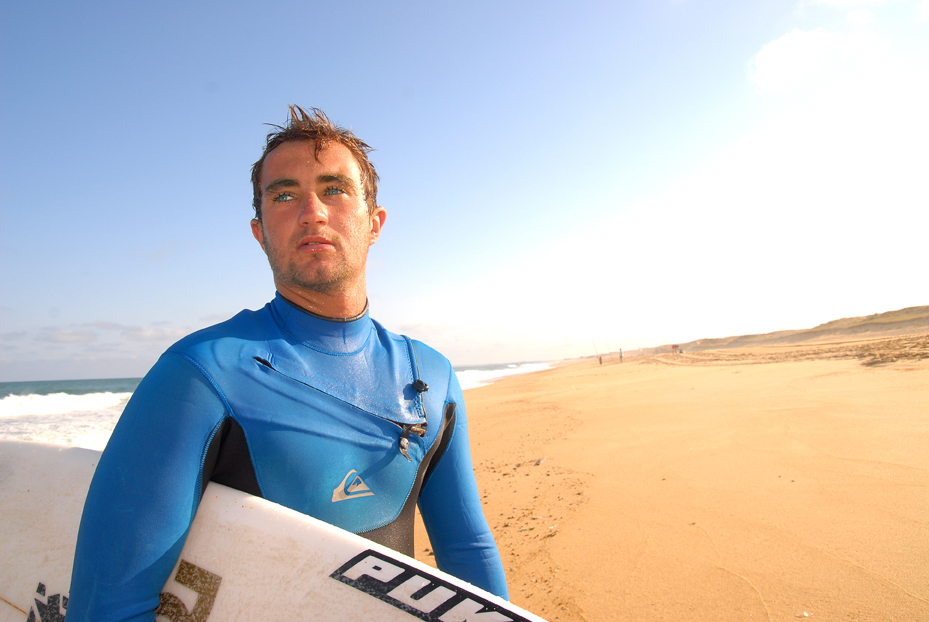

Personal information
- Born: 25 April 1989 (age 37) Bayonne, France
- Height: 177 cm (5 ft 10 in)
- Weight: 77 kg (170 lb)

Surfing career
- Sport: Surfing

Surfing specifications
- Stance: Goofy
Medal record
Men's surfing
Representing France
World Surfing Games
Gold medal – first place	2017 Biarritz	Team
Gold medal – first place	2021 La Bocana	Men
Silver medal – second place	2017 Biarritz	Men
Silver medal – second place	2024 Arecibo	Team

Joan Duru (born 25 April 1989) is a French professional surfer. A two-time World Surfing Games medalist, he qualified for the 2024 Summer Olympics.

== Early life ==
Duru was born in Bayonne on 25 April 1989. He began surfing at age seven. At age ten, Duru began competing after joining Hossegor Surf Club.

== Career ==
In 2006, Duru became the Association of Surfing Professionals European Junior champion.

Three years later, in 2009, Duru won the ASP European WQS.

At the 2017 ISA World Surfing Games, Duru won the silver medal, finishing behind Mexico’s Jhony Corzo.

Duru won the gold medal at the 2021 ISA World Surfing Games in El Salvador.

In 2023, Duru won the eighth edition of the Quemao Class.

Duru defeated Marco Mignot at the 2024 ISA World Surfing Games, placing fourth and qualifying for the remaining French slot at the 2024 Olympic games. In a post-heat interview, Duru announced his intention to retire from competitive surfing after the Olympics.
