= Jadson André =

Brazilian surfer

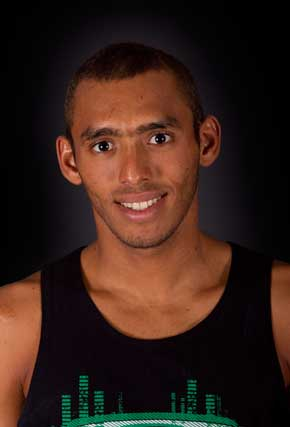

Personal information
- Born: 13 March 1990 (age 36) Natal, Rio Grande do Norte, Brazil
- Height: 5 ft 7 in (170 cm)
- Weight: 154 lb (70 kg)

Surfing career
- Sport: Surfing
- Best year: 2010 - Ranked #13 WSL CT World Tour
- Sponsors: Oakley
- Major achievements: WSL Championship Tour event wins: 1

Surfing specifications
- Stance: Goofy

Jadson André (Natal, 13 March 1990) is a Brazilian professional surfer.

== Biography ==
Jadson started surfing at the age of 10 on the beaches of Natal, Rio Grande do Norte, including Ponta Negra beach, one of the main tourist city sights, where Morro do Careca is located. Jadson was raised by his family in the city of Alexandria, where he spent part of his childhood.

Jadson Andre's poor teenage parents weren't at all keen on Jadson surfing as a youngster because of its counter-cultural associations and thought he should concentrate on soccer. An uncle however introduced him to the sport and would often take him surfing in secret. Before long though, he started winning local comps, and was offered a contract with Oakley, and hit the international circuit. He qualified for the CT in 2010 and in his rookie season won at home at the Billabong Pro Santa Catarina defeating none other than Kelly Slater in the Final.

He has been described as one of Brazil's leading professional surfers.

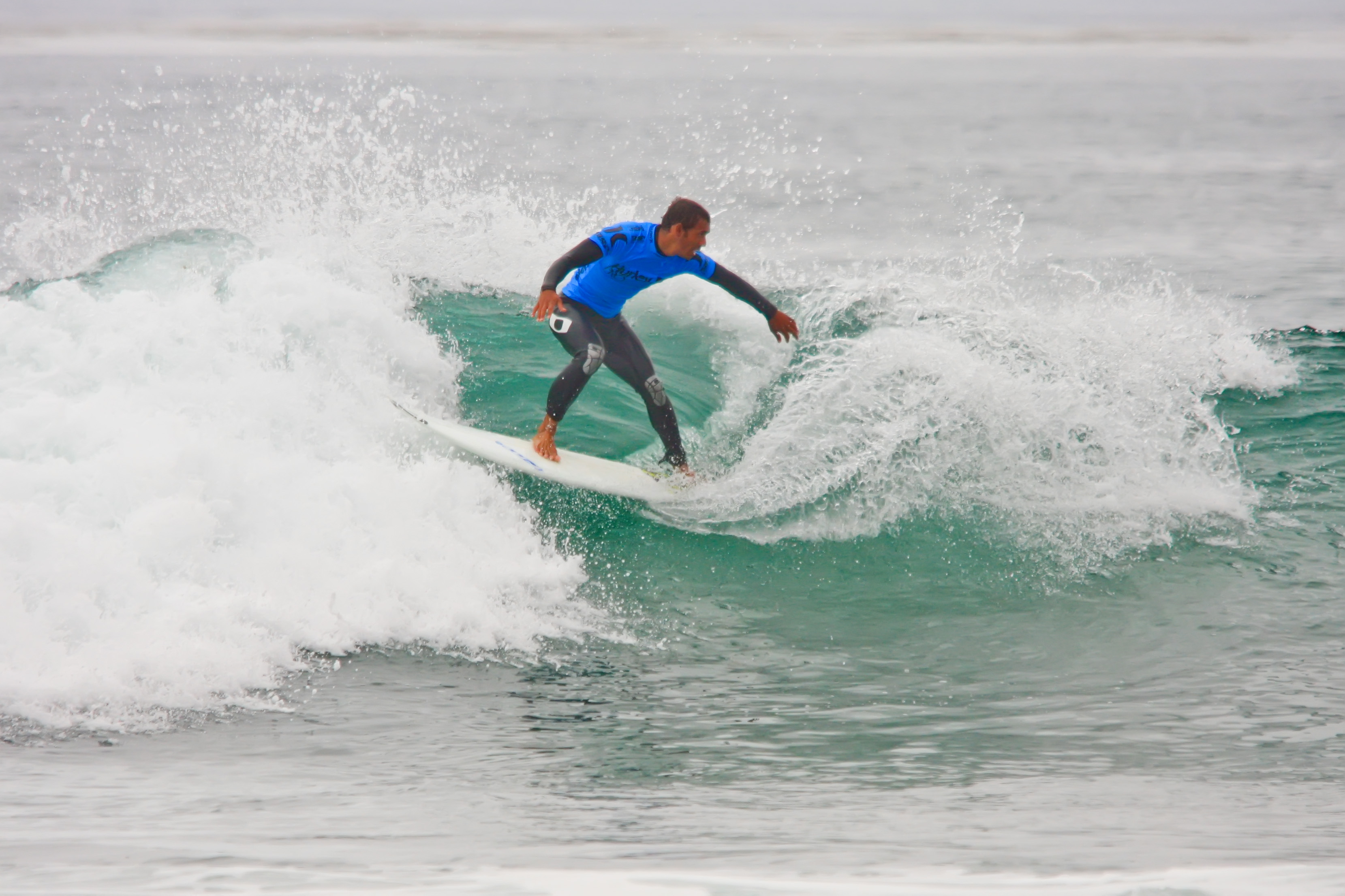
Jadson at Hurley Pro championship in San Diego, California, EUA.

== ASP World Tour ==
One of his achievements in the sport was the title of the Brazilian leg of the ASP World Tour held in 2010, in Imbituba (SC), beating one of the surfers in activity, the American Kelly Slater, eleven times world champion.

Only 20 years old and a debutant in the elite division of world surfing, he won his first victory in the Brazilian stage of the ASP World Tour on April 29, 2010, in Imbituba. Brazil's last title at home had been with former Brazilian surfer Peterson Rosa, from Paraná, in 1998, when he was still competing in the tour.

== Career victories ==
WCT Wins
Year	Event	Venue	Country
2010	Santa Catarina Pro	Imbituba, Santa Catarina	Brazil
WQS Wins
Year	Event	Venue	Country
2019	Oi Hang Loose Pro Contest	Fernando de Noronha, Pernambuco	Brazil
2014	Cascais Billabong Pro	Praia de Carcavelos, Cascais	Portugal
2013	Cascais Billabong Pro	Praia de Carcavelos, Cascais	Portugal
2009	Quiksilver Pro Africa Virgin Mobile	New Pier, Durban	South Africa
2008	Gatorade Surf Classic	Sao Francisco do Sul, Santa Catarina	Brazil
