= Caio Ibelli =

Brazilian surfer (born 1993)

Personal information
- Born: October 11, 1993 (age 32) Guaruja, SP, Brazil
- Height: 5 ft 6 in (1.68 m)
- Weight: 158 lb (72 kg)

Surfing career
- Sport: Surfing
- Best year: 2022 – Ranked No. 8 WSL CT World Tour
- Major achievements: 2011 WSL World Junior Champion; 2015 World Qualifying Series Champion; 2016 WSL Rookie of the Year

Surfing specifications
- Stance: Regular

Caio Ibelli (born October 11, 1993) is a Brazilian professional surfer who is in the World Surf League.

== Career ==
Ibelli started on the professional circuit in 2008, competing in the Qualifying Series. In 2011, he won the WSL World Junior Title at home in Rio de Janeiro, beating Australian Jack Freestone in the final. In 2015, Ibelli won the Qualifying Series without winning a single round of the circuit. With this result, he qualified for the 2016 Championship Tour for the first time in his career. In his rookie season, Caio placed 16th and won the WSL Rookie of the Year award. In the 2017 season he reached his only final on the CT, at the Bells Beach, losing to South African Jordy Smith.

Caio continued competing on the CT until the 2024 season. His best result in a season was an 8th place in the 2022 season, reaching 3 semi-finals during the season. In the 2024 season, he was ranked 25th until the mid-season cut-off, and failed to reclassify for the next season on the CT or the 2024 Challenger Series.

== Career Victories ==
WQS Wins
| Year | Event | Venue | Country |
| 2013 | Hainan Classic | Wanning, Hainan Island | China |
Juniors Wins
| Year | Event | Venue | Country |
| 2011 | Arnette ASP World Junior | Praia do Arpoador, Rio de Janeiro | Brazil |
