= Joseph Al-Sayegh =

Lebanese poet and intellectual (1928–2020)

- Born: 1928 AD
- Died: 02-11-2020; Paris
- Occupations: Poet, writer

Joseph Al-Sayegh (Arabic: جوزيف صايغ) born in Zahlé on 1928 AD and died in Paris on November 5, 2020 AD, was a Lebanese poet and intellectual.

== Upbringing and education ==
Born in Harat Al-Rasiyah in the town of Zahlé in Lebanon in 1928, he received his primary and secondary education at the College Oriental Basilien, then at the French Secular College in Beirut. He completed his studies at the Lebanese University in 1951 and then at the Lebanese Academy in 1953. He moved to Paris in 1954 and received his Ph.D. in Sociology from the Sorbonne University, titled: "The Poetic Social Phenomenon in the Valley of Zahlé", supervised by Jack Berk.

== His literary career ==
He started writing since 1946 and founded the Zahlé intellectual association in 1950. He was a member of the Zehlé Cultural Council and worked in the press and produced cultural programs and wrote in "Al-Bilaad" and "Al-Nahar" newspapers, as well as Lebanon Radio. He founded Al-Anwar newspaper literary supplement and he worked in the "Arabic Paris radio".

He returned to Lebanon, studied at the Lebanese University and founded "The Lebanese Cooperative for Writing and Publishing" (Arabic: Al-t’awniyah Al-Libnaniyah). The Lebanese Minister of Information, Ghassan Tueni, proposed him as Director of Radio Programs, but he did not get it.

He returned to Paris to work as a cultural attaché for Lebanon in UNESCO, he also studied at the University of Paris and the University of Florence, he wrote for the "(Arabic: Al-Nahar Al- ‘Arabe wa Al-Dewale)" newspaper in Paris in 1978- 1980.

In 1991, he founded the World Foundation of Authors in Arabic. He is a member of the World Foundation of Authors in Arabic. He is a member of the World Foundation for Cultural Relations- in Paris.

== List of works ==
=== Poems ===
- (Arabic title: Qosor fe Al-tofolah), 1964.
- “Evening lamps” (Arabic title: Al-Ma’sabeeh that Masa), 1972.
- “Anne-Cullen’s book” (Arabic: Kitab Aan-kolean), The Lebanese Cooperative for Writing and Publishing (Arabic: Al-t’awniyah Al-Libnaniyah), Beirut, 1974.
- “Lover” (Arabic: Al-‘Ashiq), The Lebanese Cooperative for Writing and Publishing (Arabic: Al-t’awniyah Al-Libnaniyah), Beirut, 1988.
- (Arabic title: Thalathiyat), The Lebanese Cooperative for Writing and Publishing (Arabic: Al-t’awniyah Al-Libnaniyah), Beirut, 1984.
- “The Paris poem” (Arabic title: Al-Qaidah Pares), 1992.
- (Arabic title: Al-Diwan Al-Garbe) The Lebanese Cooperative for Writing and Publishing (Arabic: Al-t’awniyah Al-Libnaniyah), Beirut, 1993.
- (Arabic title: Al-Raqam Al-Lazorid).

His complete work of poetry has been published in four volumes, by “Dar Al-Nahar” publishing, Beirut, 2005.

=== Prose works ===
- “Standards and Insanity” (Arabic title: M’year wa Jonoon), 2007.
- “The letters Galaxy” (Arabic title: Majarat Al-Horoof), 2007.
- (Arabic title: Saeed Aqil...wa Ashya’ Al-jamal), “Dar Al-Nahar” publishing, 2009.
- “Dialogue with Western Thought” (Arabic title: Hiwar Ma’a Al-Fikr Al-Garbi), Dar Nelson publishing, 2012.
- “The impossible home” (Arabic title: Al-Wattan Al-Mostaheal), 2013.
- “Mausoleum of the 20thCentury” (Arabic title: Thareh Lil-Qarn Al-Eshrean), Dar Nelson publishing, 2017.
- “Diaries without days” (Arabic title: Yawmiyat Bila Ayam), Dar Nelson publishing, 2019.

=== His translations ===
- "The Land of Humans" (Arabic title: Arth Al-Bashar), by the French writer Antoine de Saint-Exupéry, published by the General Egyptian Book Organization, 2012.

== His death ==
He died in Paris on 5 November 2020 .

== Honors ==
- Officer of the French Order of Arts and Literature.
- Recipient of the Lebanese National Order of the Cedar.
- In 2012, the American University of Science and Technology (AUST), published in its “Lebanese Memory” (Arabic: Al-Thakirah Al-Lebnaniyah) series, a book entitled “Joseph Al-Sayegh in their morris” (Arabic title: Joseph Al-Sayegh fi Marayahoum), featuring testimonies about the poet from Arab and world writers, poets and critics. The book was presented at a tribute ceremony in his presence.
- In 2014, he was honored by the commune of Zahlé with a statue of him in the poet's garden.
