= Canton of Côte d'Argent =

Coordinates: 44.20°N 1.23°W

Côte d'Argent
- Canton
- Interactive map of Côte d'Argent
- Country: France
- Region: Nouvelle-Aquitaine
- Department: Landes
- No. of communes: {{{nbcomm}}}

Government
  - Representatives (2021–2028): Xavier Fortinon; Muriel Lagorce
- Area: 967.82 km^{2} (373.68 sq mi)
- Population (2023): 26,205
  - Density: 27.076/km^{2} (70.127/sq mi)
- INSEE code: 40 03

The canton of Côte d'Argent is an administrative division of the Landes department, southwestern France. It was created at the French canton reorganisation which came into effect in March 2015. Its seat is in Mimizan.

== Composition ==
It consists of the following communes:

1. Aureilhan
2. Bias
3. Castets
4. Léon
5. Lévignacq
6. Linxe
7. Lit-et-Mixe
8. Mézos
9. Mimizan
10. Pontenx-les-Forges
11. Saint-Julien-en-Born
12. Saint-Michel-Escalus
13. Saint-Paul-en-Born
14. Taller
15. Uza
16. Vielle-Saint-Girons

== Councillors ==
Election	Councillors	Party	Occupation
2015	Xavier Fortinon	PS	Councillor of Mimizan
2015	Muriel Lagorce	PS	Former Councillor of Léon

== Pictures of the canton ==
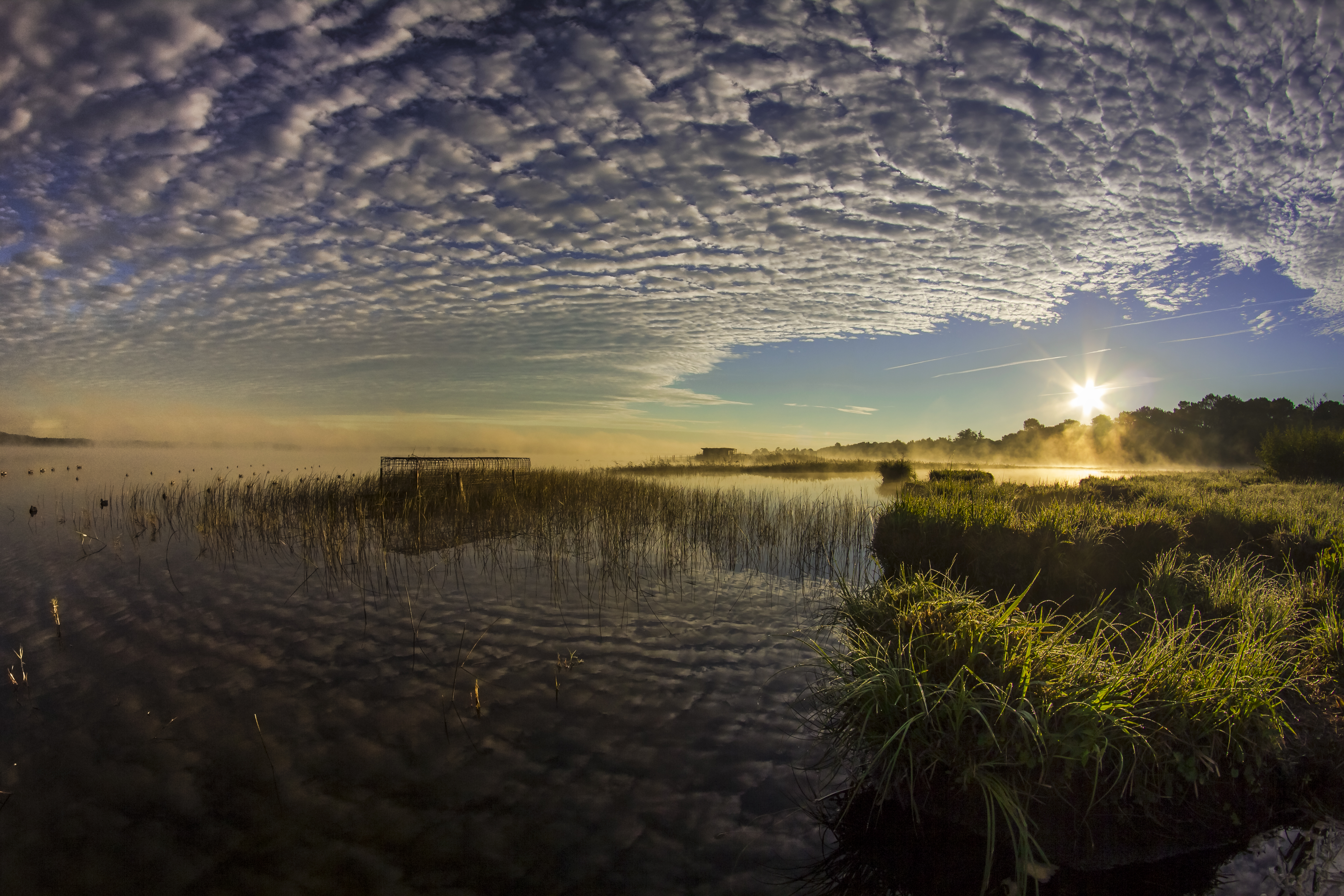
Étang d'Aureilhan

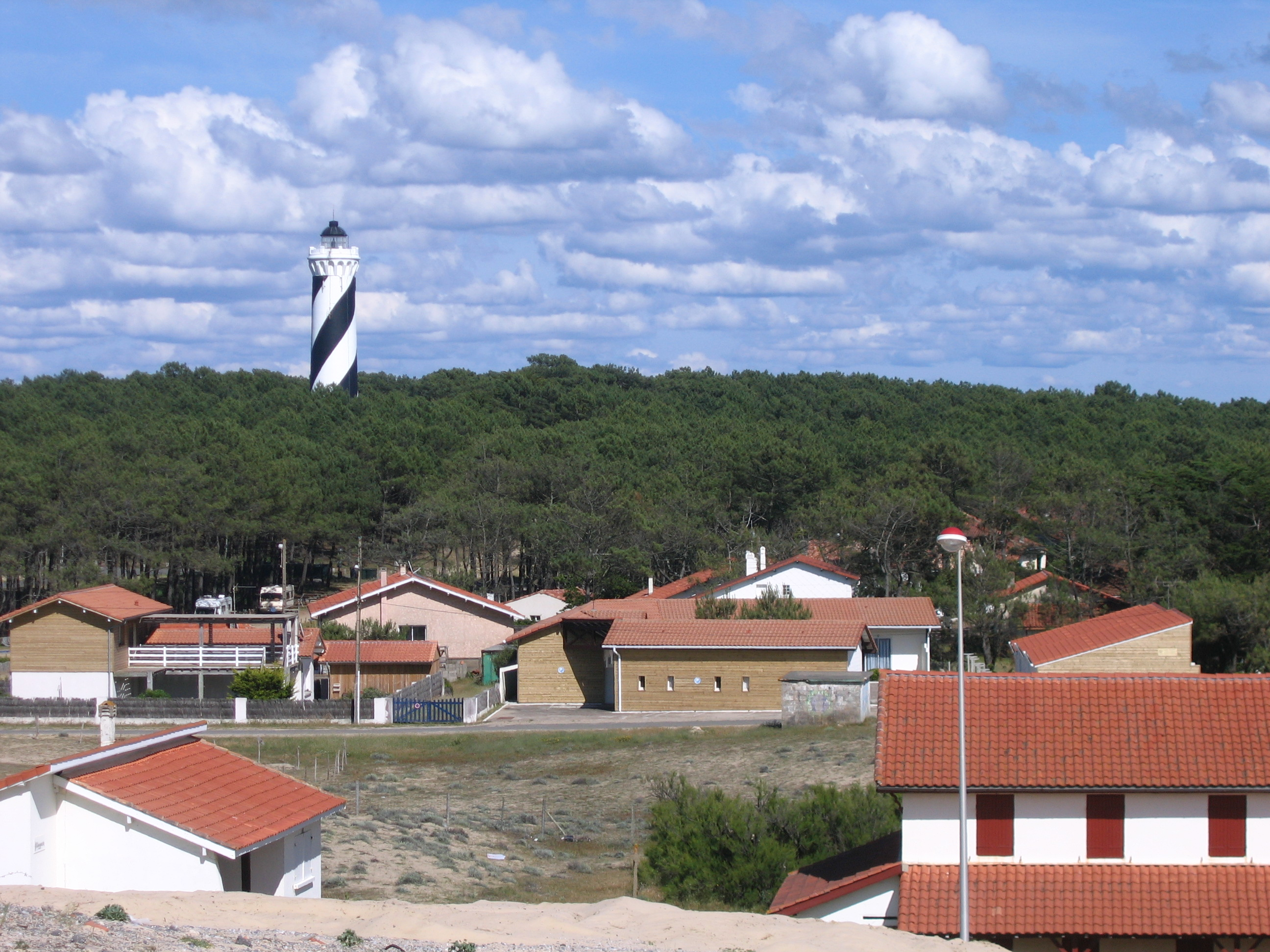
Contis's lighthouse in Saint-Julien-en-Born

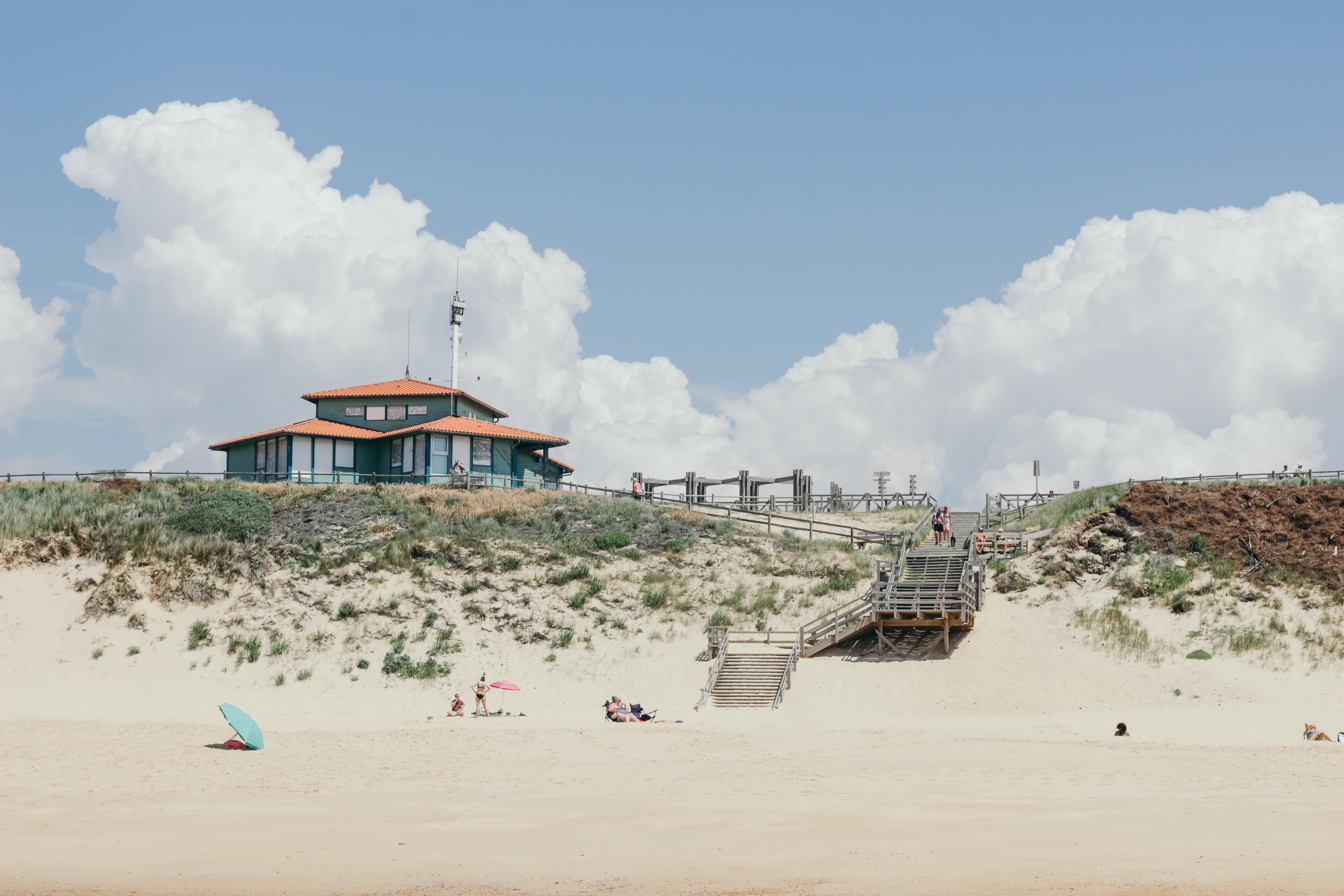
Lit-et-Mixe's beach
