= Alexia Barlier =

French actress

- Born: 21 December 1982 (age 43); Neuilly-sur-Seine, France
- Occupation: Actress
- Known for: Fast Track: No Limits; Conversations with My Gardener
- Spouse: Paul Leyden (m. 2018)
- Children: 1

Alexia Barlier (born 21 December 1982) is a French actress.

== Life and career ==
Barlier was born to a mother from New Zealand who worked as a classical dancer and yoga teacher. Her father ran art galleries. She was brought up in both the French and English languages. Parallel to school, she attended the Cours Simon in Paris, where she received her acting training.

Barlier made her film debut in 2002 as Kate in 24 Hours in the Life of a Woman. In the 2006–07, she performed at Théâtre Montparnasse in Paris in La Danse de l'Albatros by Gérald Sibleyras. In 2007, she played Magda, the younger lover/muse of a middle aged artist in the film adaptation of the novel Conversations with My Gardener. From 2010 to 2014, she played the role of Nadia Martinez in the crime series La Loi selon Bartoli and from 2013 to 2016, she played the role of Éva Blum in the television series Falco.

In 2016, Barlier starred in Michael Bay's action film 13 Hours: The Secret Soldiers of Benghazi as Sona Jillani, an undercover CIA officer. In 2017, she took on the role of teacher Eve Mendel in the miniseries The Forest. In 2019, she played the role of Juliette Dubrovsky in the mystery series La Dernière Vague.

In 2021, Barlier starred in the three-part television series Crossroads in the title role as former defense attorney and investigator Sophie Cross at the side of Thomas Jouannet as her husband Thomas Leclercq.

== Personal life ==
Barlier has been married to Paul Leyden since 2018. They have a daughter and live in Los Angeles.

== Filmography ==
=== Film ===
Year	Title	Role	Notes
2002	24 Hours in the Life of a Woman	Kate	Original title: "24 Heures de la vie d'une femme"
2004	Viper in the Fist	Kitty	Original title: "Vipère au poing"
2006	Les Ambitieux	Barbara	
2007	Conversations with My Gardener	Magda	Original title: "Dialogue avec mon jardinier"
2008	Fast Track: No Limits	Nicole Devereaux	
2010	Storms	Josiane	TV film, Original title: "Tempêtes"
2013	Amitiés sincères	Isabelle	
2014	A.D.N., l'âme de la terre	Kyera	
2014	Missing Thomas	French Lady	Short film
2014	The Missionaries	Daphné	Original title: "Tu veux ou tu veux pas"
2014	SK1	Solange Doumic	Original title: "L'Affaire SK1"
2014	What We Did on Our Holiday	Françoise Dupré	
2016	13 Hours: The Secret Soldiers of Benghazi	Sona Jillani	
2016	Tout Schuss	Elsa Jay	
2017	Imposture	Lili	TV film
2020	Chick Fight	Chloe	

=== Television ===
Year	Title	Role	Notes
2005	Vénus et Apollon		Episode: "Soin sunlight"
2005	Le juge est une femme	Armelle Richard	Episode: "La petite marchande de fleurs"
2006	Préjudices	Marie-Alice	Episode: "Huan Ying"
2007	Le juge est une femme	Karine	Episode: "Liquidation totale"
2008	R.I.S. Police scientifique	Caroline Delattre	Episode: "The Fanatic"
2008	Sœur Thérèse.com	Alice Kenza	Episode: "Meurtre au grand bain"
2009	Ligne de feu	Audrey	Episode: "Sauver ou périr"
2010	Kali	Kali	Series regular
2010–2014	La Loi selon Bartoli	Nadia Martinez	Series of TV films, 3 installments
2012	Fais pas ci, fais pas ça	Prof de Sport	Episode: "Le joker connerie"
2012	Roxane, la vie sexuelle de ma pote	Estelle	Episode: "Femme fatale"
2013	La Croisière	Mathilde Prudhomme	Episode: "Vive la mariée"
2013–2016	Falco	Eva Blum	Series regular, 26 episodes
2015	Nina	Dr. Hélène Maurier	Series regular, 8 episodes
2016	Les Petits Meurtres d'Agatha Christie	Diane Clément-Roussel	Episode: "La Mystérieuse Affaire de Styles"
2017	The Forest	Eve Mendel	Original title: "La forêt", 6 episodes
2018	Noces rouges	Alice Pavane	Series regular, 6 episodes
2018	L'Art du crime	Marie Seghers	Episode: "Une Ombre au Tableau"
2018	The Hook Up Plan	Gaïa	Episodes: "Plan Secret" & "Plan Teuf"
2019	La Dernière Vague	Juliette Dubrovsky	Series regular, 6 episodes
2021	Sophie Cross	Sophie Cross	Miniseries, 3 episodes
2022	Toutouyoutou	Jane	10 episodes
2022	La dernière Reine de Tahiti	Madison	
2022	Petit ange	Clara Malherbe	
