= Uza =

Uza may refer to:

Places

- Uza, Landes, a village in the department of Landes in France
- Uza, Israel, a moshav in Israel
- Horvat Uza (Uza ruins), archaeological site in the Negev desert, Israel
- Horbat 'Uza (Uza ruins), archaeological site east of Acre in northwestern Israel

Other uses

- "Uza" (song), a 2012 song by AKB48

UzA may refer to:

- Uzbekistan National News Agency

UZA may refer to:

- Abbreviation for "urbanized area" in metropolitan planning organizations
- Universitair Ziekenhuis Antwerpen, the university hospital of Antwerp University
