= Aureilhan =

Aureilhan is the name of the following communes in France:

- Aureilhan, Landes, in the Landes department
- Aureilhan, Hautes-Pyrénées, in the Hautes-Pyrénées department
