= Jacques Berque =

Jacques Augustin Berque (4 June 1910 – 27 June 1995) was a French scholar of Islam and sociologist of the Collège de France, born in Molière, Algeria. His expertise was the decolonisation of Algeria and Morocco.

Berque wrote several histories on the classical and medieval periods in the Arab world, as well as highly influential works on modern era colonisation and decolonisation. He had a countervailing influence on French historiography of the first half of the twentieth century, which tended to see Arabs and in particular the inhabitants of North Africa as a less advanced people or pawns of a victorious France; Berque emphasized instead the rich Arab cultural heritage at a time when historical opinion was sharply divided. As such he was viewed as a sympathetic observer of Muslim society, arguing that the role of Islam was key to any work on the Middle East and North Africa.

== Biography ==
Born of French parents in Frenda (now in Tiaret Province) in French Algeria, he was a pied-noir. His father, Augustin Berque, was a colonial administrator in Algeria and an Islamologue belonging to the tradition of the French colonial intelligence apparatus Service des Affaires Indigènes (the successor entity of the Bureaux arabes), who also was a member of the Action Française. Jacques Berque graduated from University of Algiers in 1929, and obtained a M.A. degree a year later. He joined the French army, and from 1934 to 1944 worked as a civil servant in Morocco. As such, he worked as an agronomist in attempts to improve Moroccan agriculture and the life of the peasants. Later he became administrator of the Seksawa tribe, at Imi n'Tanout, High Atlas. Five years of residence among them led to the book which established his scholarly reputation, Les Structures Sociales du Haut Atlas (1955). It remains one of the most thorough ethnographies of the Berbers. He lived his last years and died in a village in the Landes, the region in south-west France from which the Berque family originates. He died in Saint-Julien-en-Born.

== Career ==
In 1947 he became a Middle East expert for Unesco. He was sent to Egypt in 1953, returning to Paris two years later. He was made director of Muslim Sociological Studies at the Ecole Practique des Hautes Etudes, and a year later, in 1956, was appointed Professor of the Social History of Contemporary Islam at the Collège de France, a post he occupied until his retirement in 1981. Later he presided over two government missions, one at the Ministry of Research (1981–1982) and the other at the Ministry of Education (1984–1985).

Among some of Berque's most important works are his books Les Arabes d'hier a demain (1960) and L'Egypte: imperialisme et revolution (1967), translated into English by Jean Stewart as The Arabs: their history and future (1964) and Egypt: imperialism and revolution (1972). The latter, which is divided into five parts, deals with the history and social structure of Egypt from the 18th century up to 1952 when the monarchy was toppled.

In an earlier work, Le Maghreb entre deux guerres ("The Maghreb between two world wars", 1962), Berque criticizes the colonial system. His administrative and ethnographic experience eventually took him in a direction adopted by few North-African-born Frenchmen or by colonial administrators: he came out in favour of independence. Berque was one of the few Europeans who retained links with the new Algeria after the bloody war. As the theoretician of third-worldist romanticism, he became influential to the entire Arab-Muslim world, and even of the Third World as a whole. Another work on the Maghreb, L'Interieur du Maghreb, XVe-XIXe siecle (1978), gives Berque's own interpretation of its history. Based on a reading of 15 texts which he had taught at the Collège de France, the book runs to more than 500 pages, and is an important document on the history of the Maghreb.

Important as well is Languages arabes du present ("Present-day languages of the Arabs", 1974), which delves into the literary history of the Arabs, their language and culture. Berque's linguistic versatility is made apparent here in his translations of Arabic poetry from the classical period to the present, and in his analysis of the varieties of spoken and written Arabic. He was an accomplished Arabist, perfecting several Arabic dialects of both the Maghreb and the Middle East. He believed in the importance of bringing together different, but related, regions, whether in the Arabic- speaking world or in the Mediterranean, as can be seen from the titles of two of his books, De l'Euphrate a l'Atlas ("From the Euphrates to the Atlas", 1978) and Memoires des deux rives ("Recollections from Both Shores of the Mediterranean", 1989), the latter described by Ernest Gellner, as 'a splendid account of what it was to be a pied-noir slowly converted to anti-colonialism'. He once said in an interview that since childhood he had tried fervently 'to synthesise the cultures of the northern shore of the Mediterranean with those of its southern shore'.

Berque's most lasting contribution might have been to the study of Islam. A devout Christian, he found in Islam "a new version of the truth of the world". Made a Chevalier de la Légion d'honneur in his own country, he was decorated also by Morocco, Syria and Tunisia. In Egypt he was made a member of the Arabic Language Academy of Cairo.

== Orientalism controversy ==
In the literary sparrings between Bernard Lewis and Edward Said, who criticized Orientalist scholarship, claiming Lewis' work to be a prime example of Orientalism, in his 1978 book Orientalism, Berque was among the scholars, such as Maxime Rodinson, Malcolm H. Kerr, Albert Hourani, and William Montgomery Watt, who maintained that Said's disregard for all the evidence that contradicted his narrative made Orientalism a deeply flawed account of Western scholarship.

== Sources ==
- Pouillon, François (2019). « Jacques Berque : les miroirs brisés de la colonisation » in Christine Laurière et André Mary (dir), Ethnologues en situations coloniales, Les Carnets de Bérose n° 11, Paris, BEROSE - International Encyclopaedia of the Histories of Anthropology, pp. 80-108.
