= A660 =

A660 may refer to:

- A660 road, road in England
- A660 autoroute in France, which connects to the A63 autoroute
