= Vielle-Saint-Girons =

- Commune
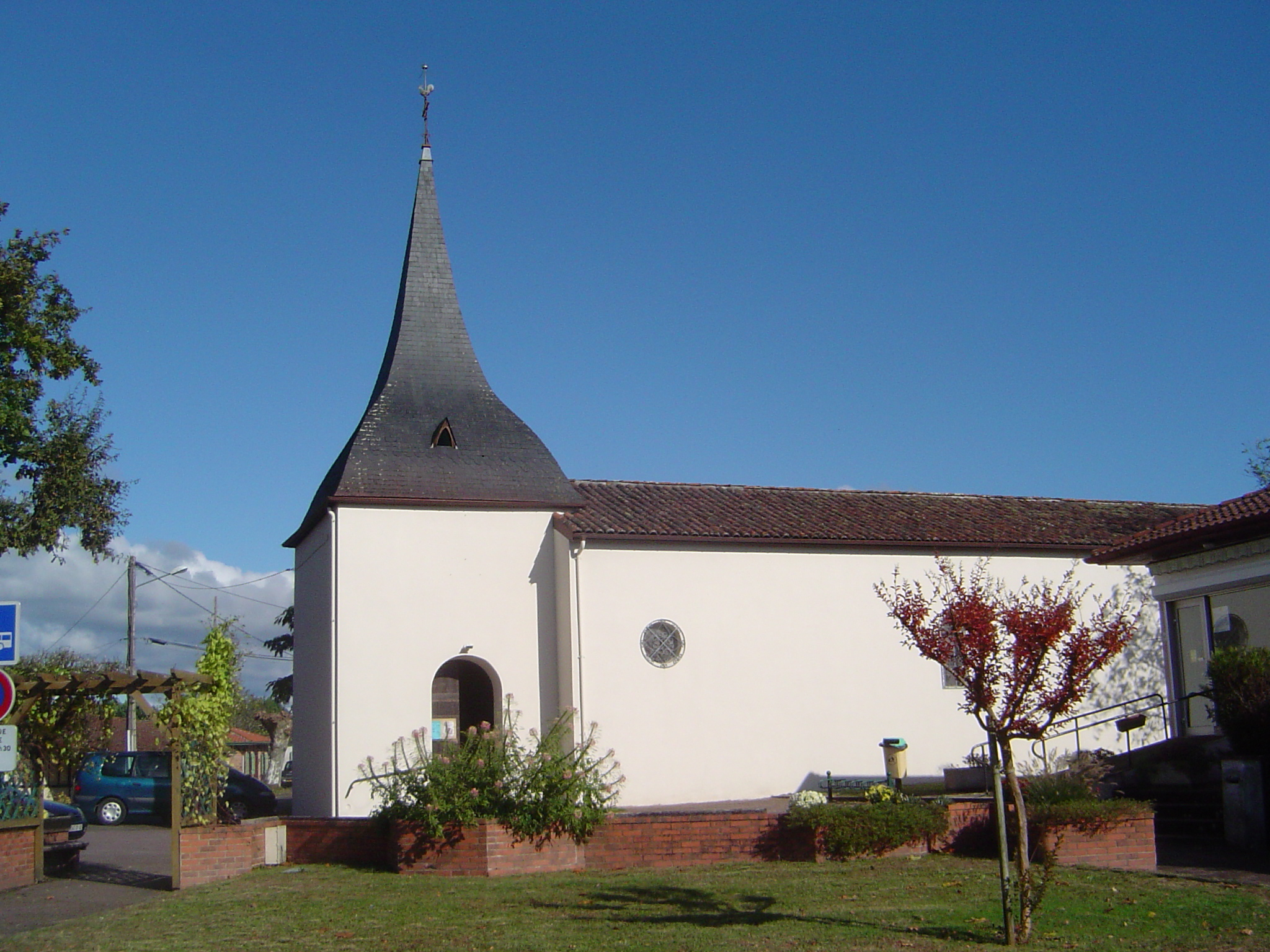

- Coat of arms
- Location of Vielle-Saint-Girons
- Location within France Location within Nouvelle-Aquitaine
- Coordinates: 43°57′00″N 1°17′53″W
- Country: France
- Region: Nouvelle-Aquitaine
- Department: Landes
- Arrondissement: Dax
- Canton: Côte d'Argent
- Intercommunality: Côte Landes Nature

Government
  - Mayor (2020–2026): Karine Dasquet
- Area^{1}: 72.03 km^{2} (27.81 sq mi)
- Elevation: 20 m (66 ft)
- Highest elevation: 76 m (249 ft)
- Lowest elevation: 0 m (0 ft)
- Population (2023): 1,518
  - Density: 21.07/km^{2} (54.58/sq mi)
- Time zone: UTC+01:00 (CET)
  - Summer (DST): UTC+02:00 (CEST)
- INSEE/Postal code: 40326 /40560
- ^{1} French Land Register data, which excludes lakes, ponds, glaciers > 1 km^{2} (0.386 sq mi or 247 acres) and river estuaries.

Vielle-Saint-Girons (French pronunciation: [vjɛl sɛ̃ ʒiʁɔ̃]; Gascon: Viela-Sent Gironç) is a commune in the Landes department in Nouvelle-Aquitaine in southwestern France.

== Population ==
Historical population
Year	Pop.	±% p.a.
1968	864	—
1975	863	−0.02%
1982	824	−0.66%
1990	859	+0.52%
1999	1,026	+1.99%
2007	1,118	+1.08%
2012	1,204	+1.49%
2017	1,305	+1.62%
2023	1,518	+2.55%
Source: INSEE

== See also ==
- Communes of the Landes department
