= Paul Leyden =

Australian actor, producer and screenwriter

- Born: 16 December 1972 (age 53); Melbourne, Australia
- Spouses: Estelle Andrewartha (m. 2007; div. 2015) Alexia Barlier (m. 2018)
- Children: 1

Paul Augustine Leyden (born 16 December 1972) is an Australian actor, producer, screenwriter and director. He is known for playing the role of Simon Frasier on the American daytime soap opera As the World Turns from 2000 to 2010.

== Early life ==
Leyden was born and raised in Melbourne by his parents, John and Ros Leyden. He is one of five children.

== Career ==
Leyden portrayed Simon Frasier on the CBS soap opera As the World Turns from 2000 to 2004, 2006 to 2007, and 2009 to 2010. From 2004 to 2005, Leyden starred as Tony Magulia in the NBC series LAX. Leyden played Simon Taylor in the miniseries Maneater in 2009, and played Blake Joseph on the CBS soap opera The Young and the Restless from 2010 to 2011.

Leyden starred in the miniseries Tribe, and can be seen in episodes of Farscape, BeastMaster, Law & Order: Special Victims Unit and Home and Away.

== Personal life ==
Leyden's hobbies include playing outdoor sports, the saxophone, and guitar. He married Alexia Barlier in 2018. They have a daughter and live in Los Angeles.

== Filmography ==
- As the World Turns as Simon Frasier (2000–2004, 2006–2007, 2009–2010)
- LAX as Tony Magulia (2004–2005)
- Maneater as Simon Taylor (2009)
- The Young and the Restless as Blake Joseph (2010–2011)
- The Hunter's Prayer (2017, producer, screenwriter)
- Chick Fight (2020, director)
- R.I.P.D. 2: Rise of the Damned (2022, director)
- Ghost Whisperer (Season 1, episode 7)
