= Bias, Landes =

Bias
- Commune
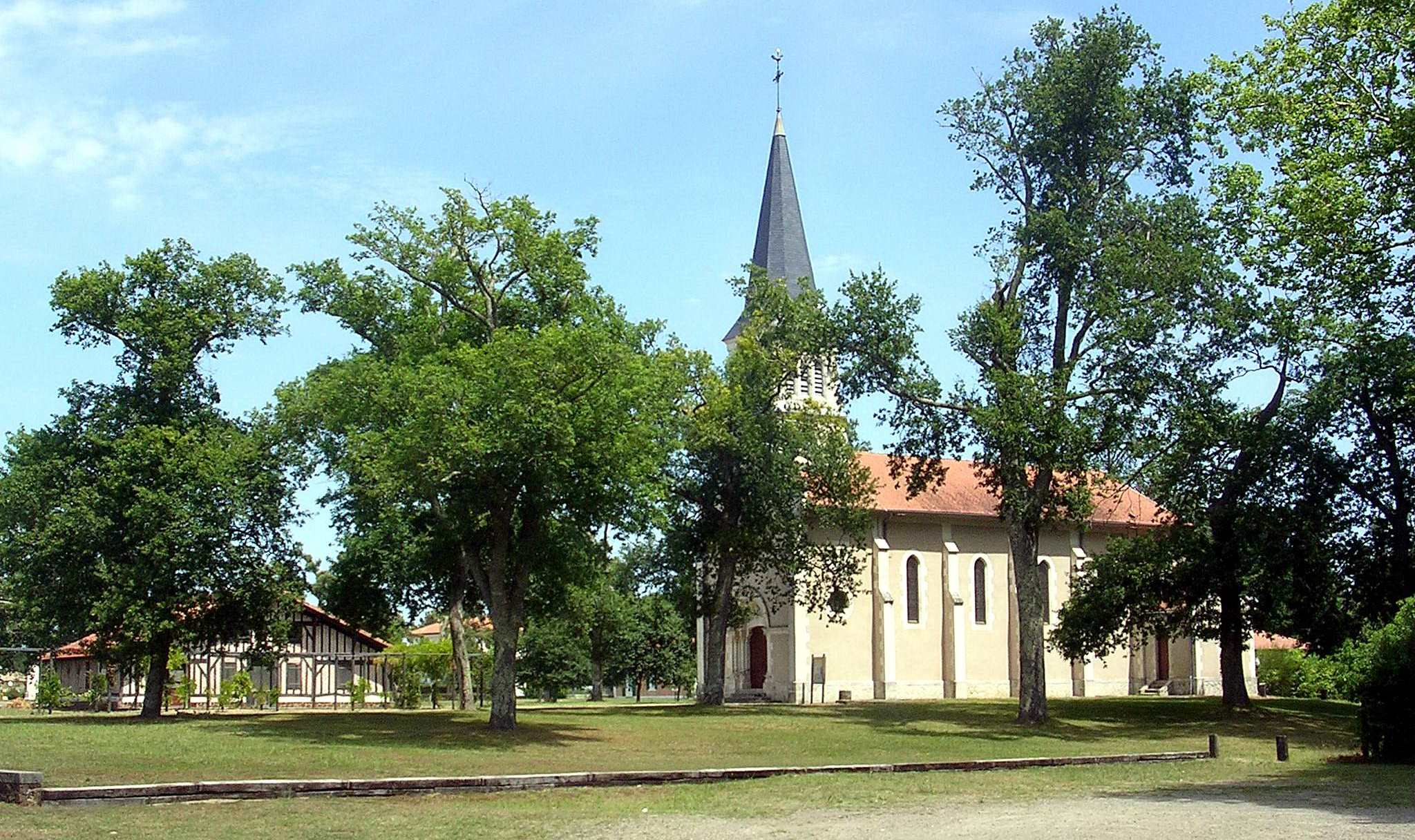
- Location of Bias
- Location within France Location within Nouvelle-Aquitaine
- Coordinates: 44°08′49″N 1°13′39″W
- Country: France
- Region: Nouvelle-Aquitaine
- Department: Landes
- Arrondissement: Mont-de-Marsan
- Canton: Côte d'Argent
- Intercommunality: Mimizan

Government
  - Mayor (2020–2026): Elisabeth Etcheverria
- Area^{1}: 20.95 km^{2} (8.09 sq mi)
- Elevation: 40 m (130 ft)
- Highest elevation: 70 m (230 ft)
- Lowest elevation: 20 m (66 ft)
- Population (2023): 809
  - Density: 38.6/km^{2} (100/sq mi)
- Time zone: UTC+01:00 (CET)
  - Summer (DST): UTC+02:00 (CEST)
- INSEE/Postal code: 40043 /40170
- ^{1} French Land Register data, which excludes lakes, ponds, glaciers > 1 km^{2} (0.386 sq mi or 247 acres) and river estuaries.

Bias is a commune in the Landes department in Nouvelle-Aquitaine in southwestern France.

== Population ==
Historical population
Year	Pop.	±% p.a.
1968	269	—
1975	320	+2.51%
1982	395	+3.05%
1990	505	+3.12%
1999	514	+0.20%
2007	696	+3.86%
2012	728	+0.90%
2017	739	+0.30%
2023	809	+1.52%
Source: INSEE

== See also ==
- Communes of the Landes department
