= Léon, Landes =

Léon
- Commune
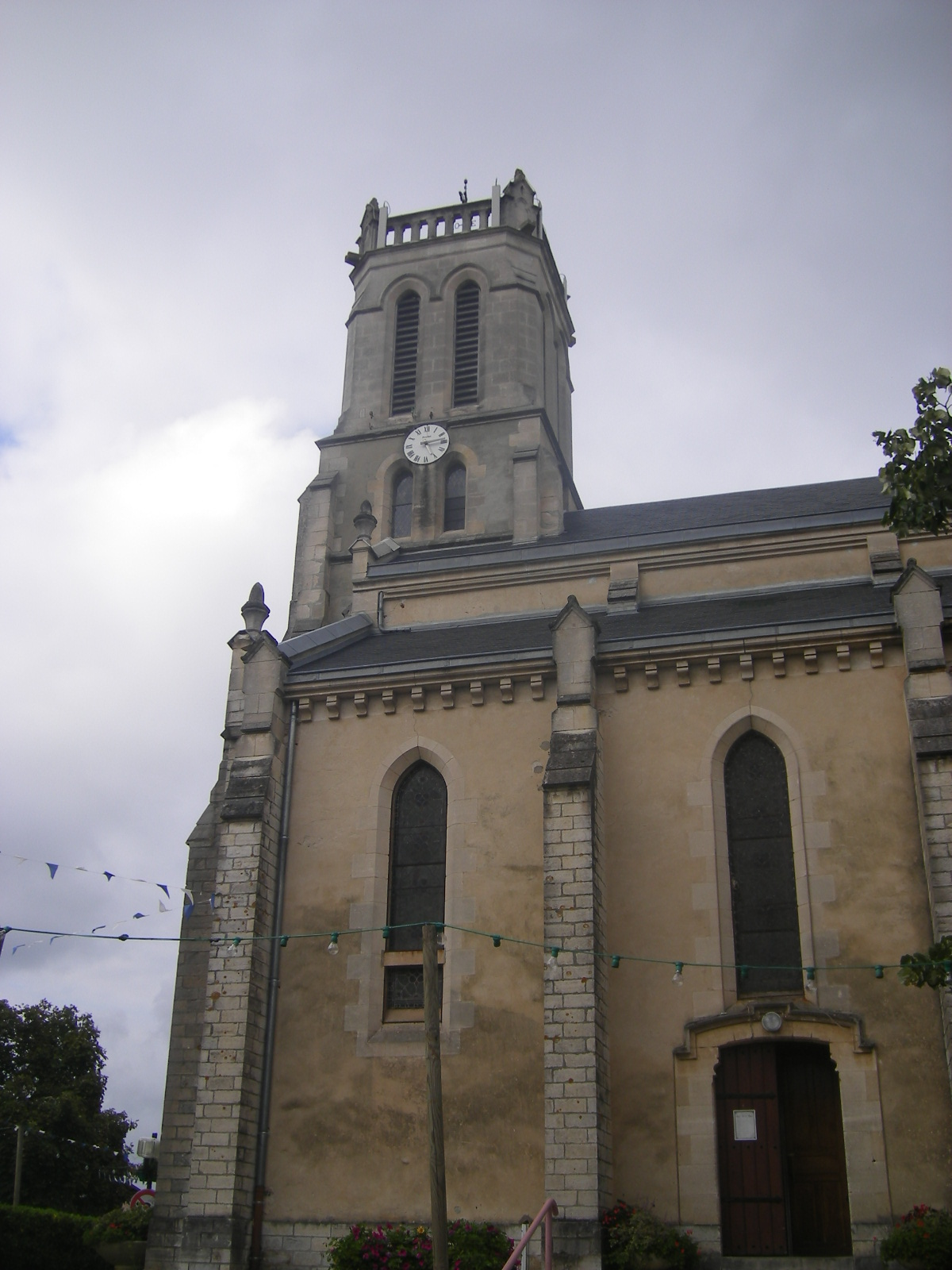
- The church in Léon

- Coat of arms
- Location of Léon
- Location within France Location within Nouvelle-Aquitaine
- Coordinates: 43°52′41″N 1°18′07″W
- Country: France
- Region: Nouvelle-Aquitaine
- Department: Landes
- Arrondissement: Dax
- Canton: Côte d'Argent
- Intercommunality: Côte Landes Nature

Government
  - Mayor (2020–2026): Jean Mora
- Area^{1}: 64.45 km^{2} (24.88 sq mi)
- Elevation: 49 m (161 ft)
- Highest elevation: 67 m (220 ft)
- Lowest elevation: 6 m (20 ft)
- Population (2023): 2,306
  - Density: 35.78/km^{2} (92.67/sq mi)
- Time zone: UTC+01:00 (CET)
  - Summer (DST): UTC+02:00 (CEST)
- INSEE/Postal code: 40150 /40550
- ^{1} French Land Register data, which excludes lakes, ponds, glaciers > 1 km^{2} (0.386 sq mi or 247 acres) and river estuaries.

Léon (French pronunciation: [leɔ̃]; Occitan: Lon) is a commune in the Landes department in Nouvelle-Aquitaine in south-western France.

== Population ==
Historical population
Year	Pop.	±% p.a.
1968	1,189	—
1975	1,258	+0.81%
1982	1,363	+1.15%
1990	1,330	−0.31%
1999	1,453	+0.99%
2007	1,695	+1.94%
2012	1,969	+3.04%
2017	1,940	−0.30%
2023	2,306	+2.92%
Source: INSEE

== See also ==
- Communes of the Landes department
