= Taller =

- Commune
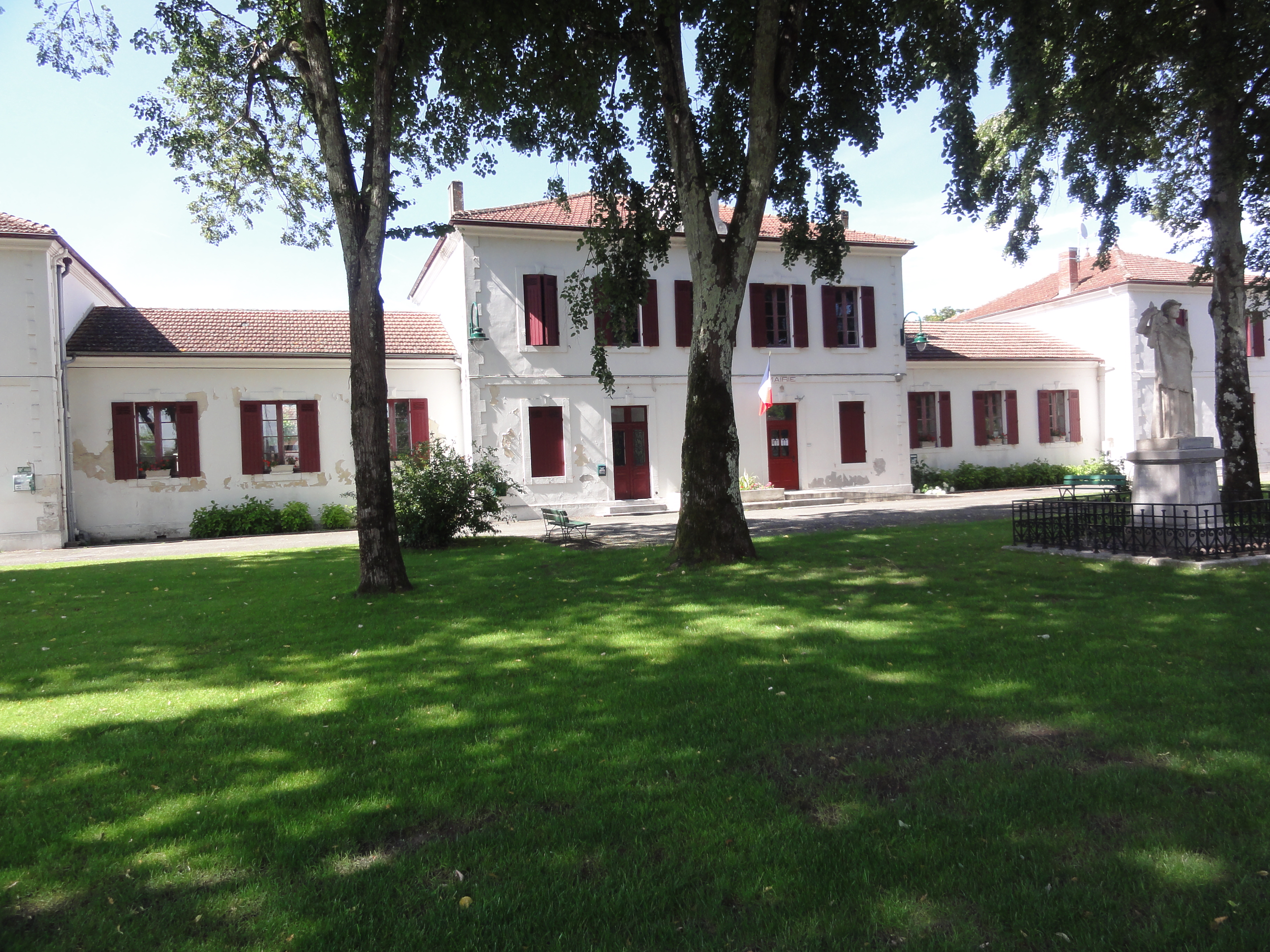
- Town hall
- Location of Taller
- Location within France Location within Nouvelle-Aquitaine
- Coordinates: 43°52′25″N 1°04′18″W
- Country: France
- Region: Nouvelle-Aquitaine
- Department: Landes
- Arrondissement: Dax
- Canton: Côte d'Argent
- Intercommunality: Côte Landes Nature

Government
  - Mayor (2020–2026): Claire Luciano
- Area^{1}: 41.07 km^{2} (15.86 sq mi)
- Elevation: 84 m (276 ft)
- Highest elevation: 89 m (292 ft)
- Lowest elevation: 57 m (187 ft)
- Population (2023): 693
  - Density: 16.9/km^{2} (43.7/sq mi)
- Time zone: UTC+01:00 (CET)
  - Summer (DST): UTC+02:00 (CEST)
- INSEE/Postal code: 40311 /40260
- ^{1} French Land Register data, which excludes lakes, ponds, glaciers > 1 km^{2} (0.386 sq mi or 247 acres) and river estuaries.

Taller is a commune in the Landes department in Nouvelle-Aquitaine in southwestern France.

William II Sánchez of Gascony perpetrated a major defeat of the Vikings at Taller in 982 and they vanished as a serious threat thereafter.

== Population ==
Historical population
Year	Pop.	±% p.a.
1968	396	—
1975	404	+0.29%
1982	389	−0.54%
1990	396	+0.22%
1999	418	+0.60%
2007	404	−0.42%
2012	559	+6.71%
2017	606	+1.63%
2023	693	+2.26%
Source: INSEE

== Etymology ==
The origins of the name "Taller" are still uncertain but might come from the English word "tall", which could be related to the altitude of the village from which went from 70 to 90m in 982. Taller used to be called Talleyras.

== History ==
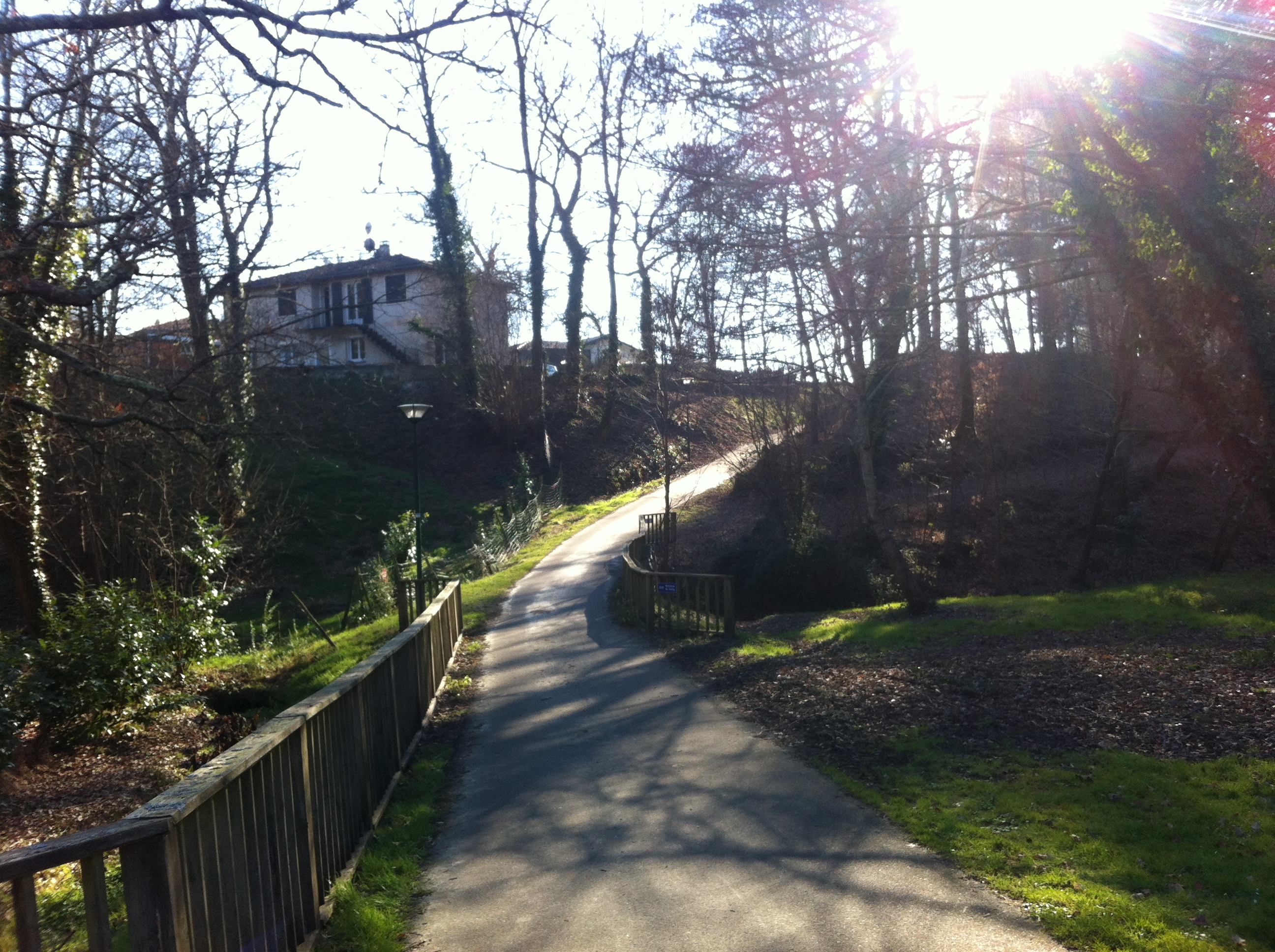
Location where the battle took place.

Legends say that in 982 Guillaume Sanche duc d'Aquitaine (Gascogne) fought and won against the Normans (Vikings).

During World War II, Taller used to be a German ammunition depot.

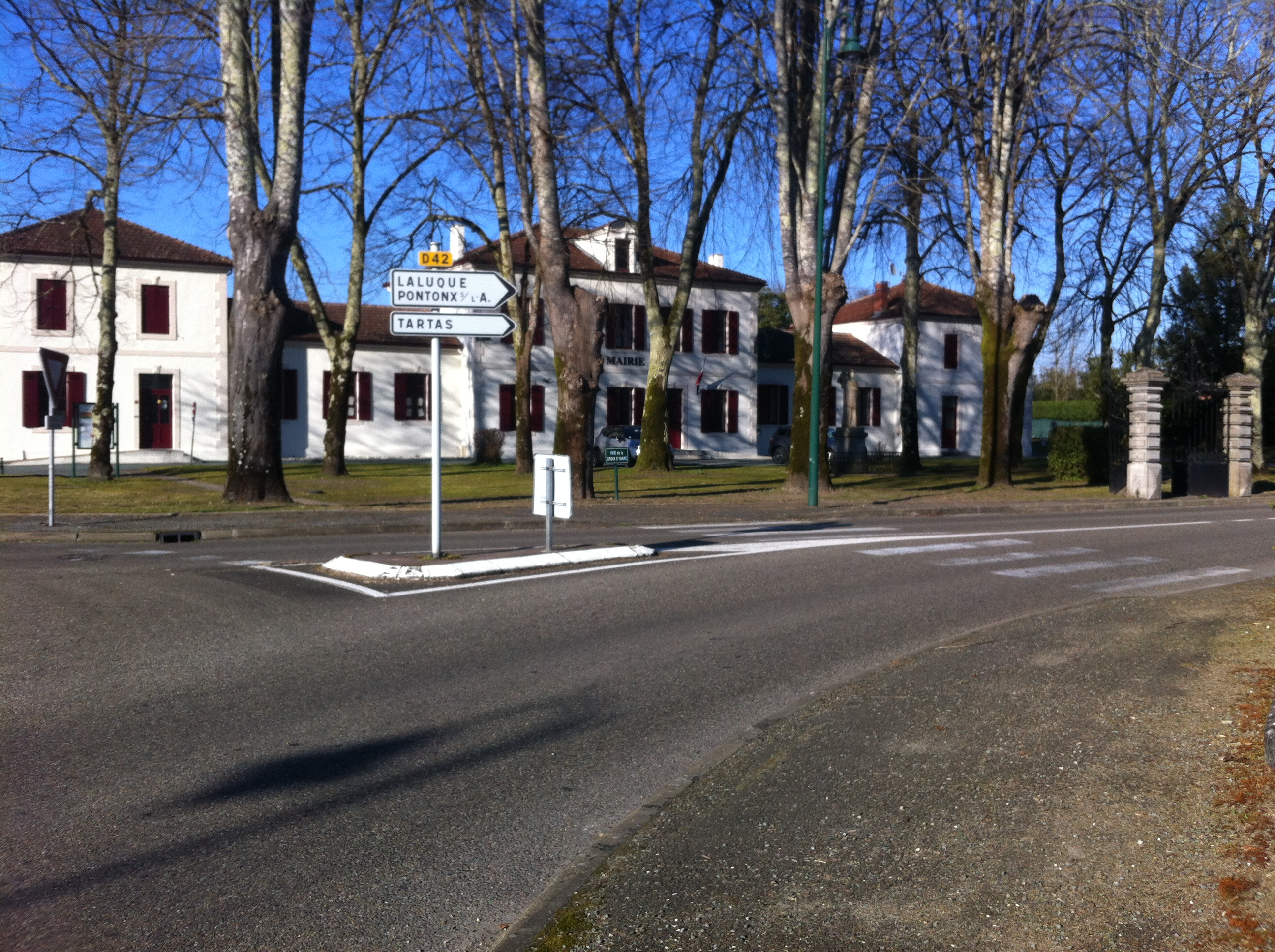
Taller's Town Hall

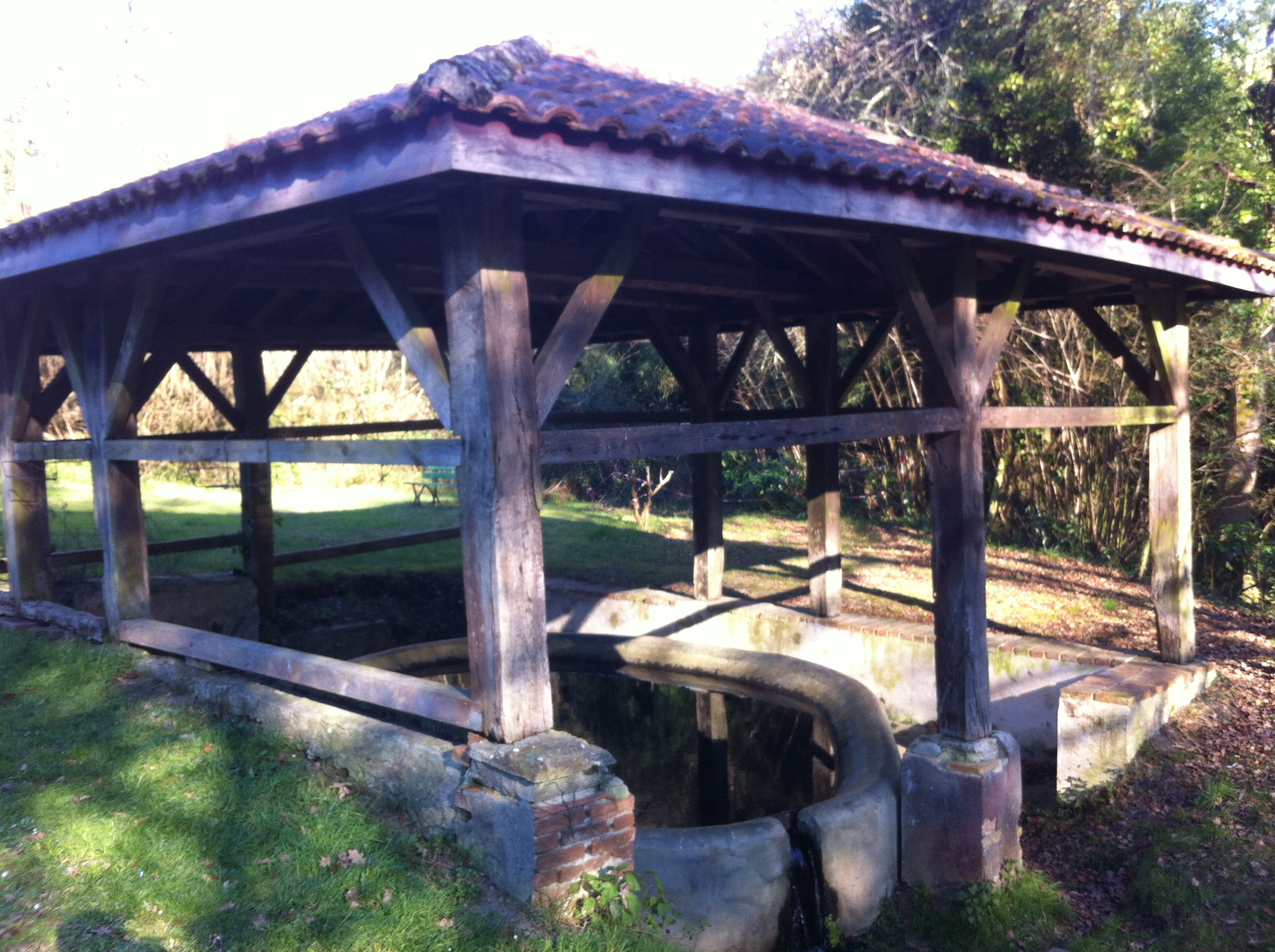
The Wash House in Taller

== Geography ==
Taller is located in France, in Nouvelle-Aquitaine in the Landes department, near Dax Pilgrims walk through the village because it is part of the "Chemin de Compostelle" (Compostelle Way).

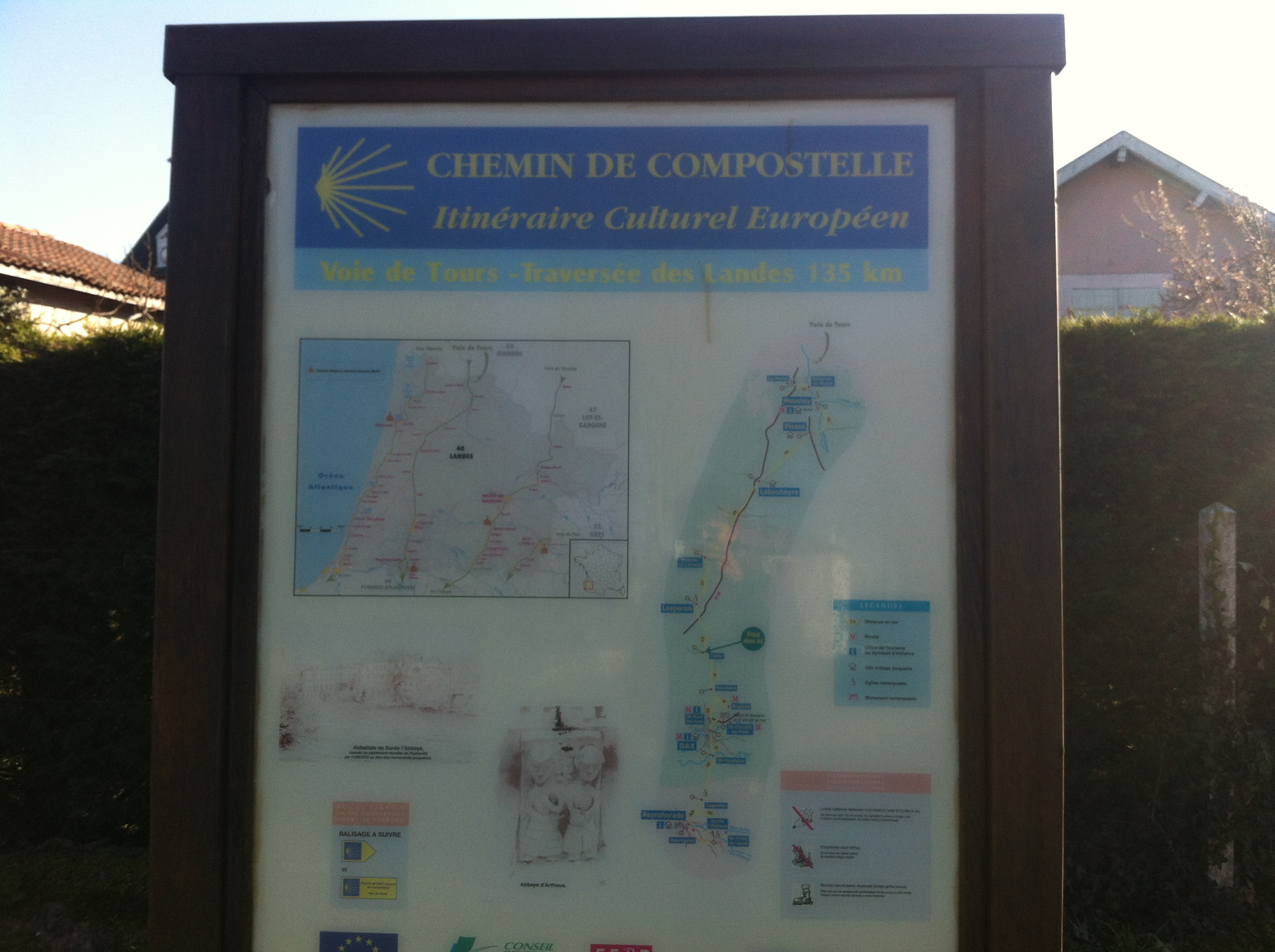
"Chemin de Compostelle" Itinerary

== Education ==
There is a primary school in Taller; however children over 7 years old have to attend another school located in Lesgor. There is also a Music school next to the primary school.

== Heritage buildings ==
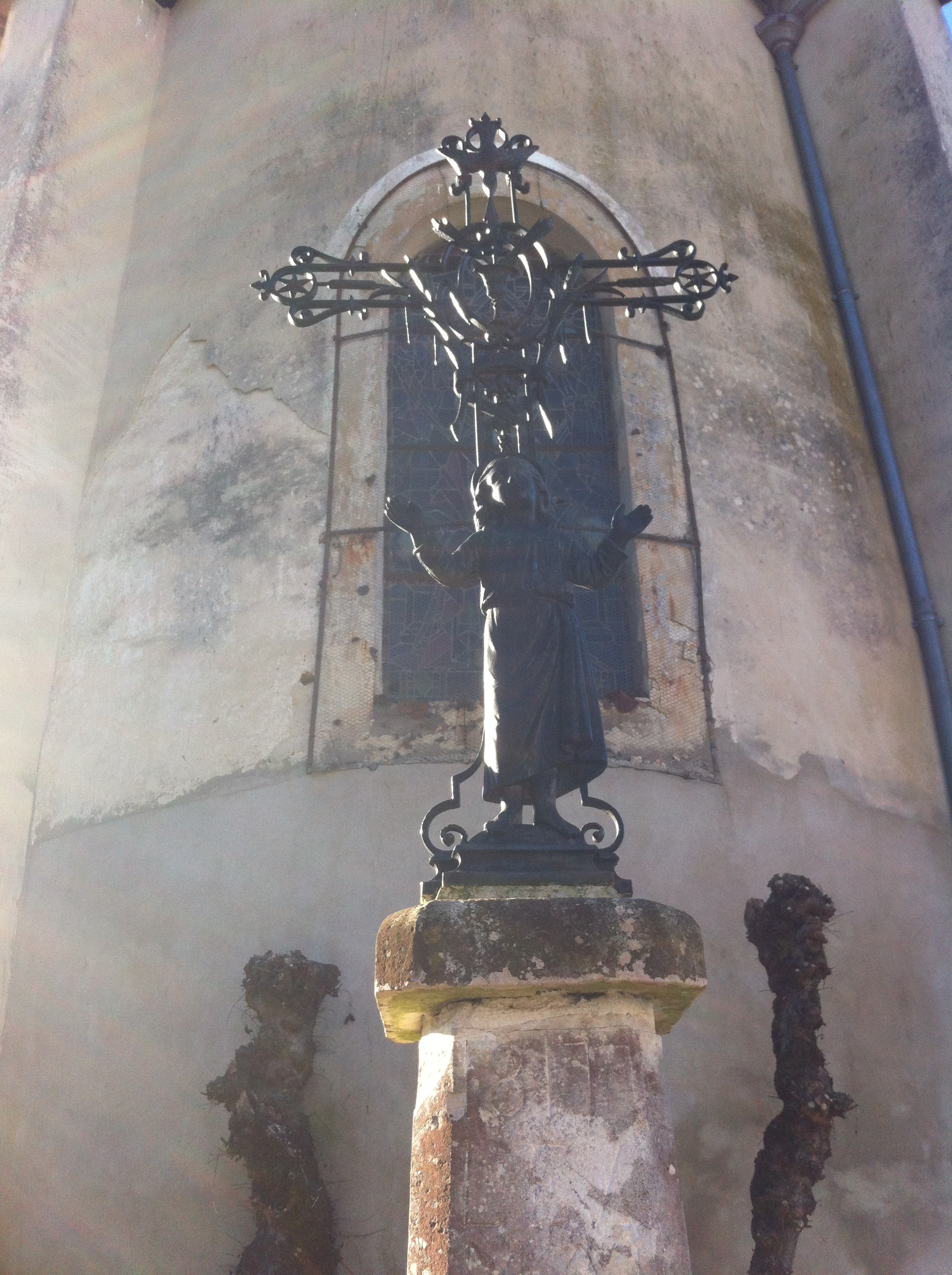
"Saint Barthélemy" church

There is an old wash house and a 16th-century "Saint Barthélemy" church.

== Sport ==
In Taller there is a football club a bowling (pétanque) patch, tennis courts, and a has boxing club, a tai chi club and a yoga club.

== See also ==
- Communes of the Landes department
