= Saint-Michel-Escalus =

- Commune
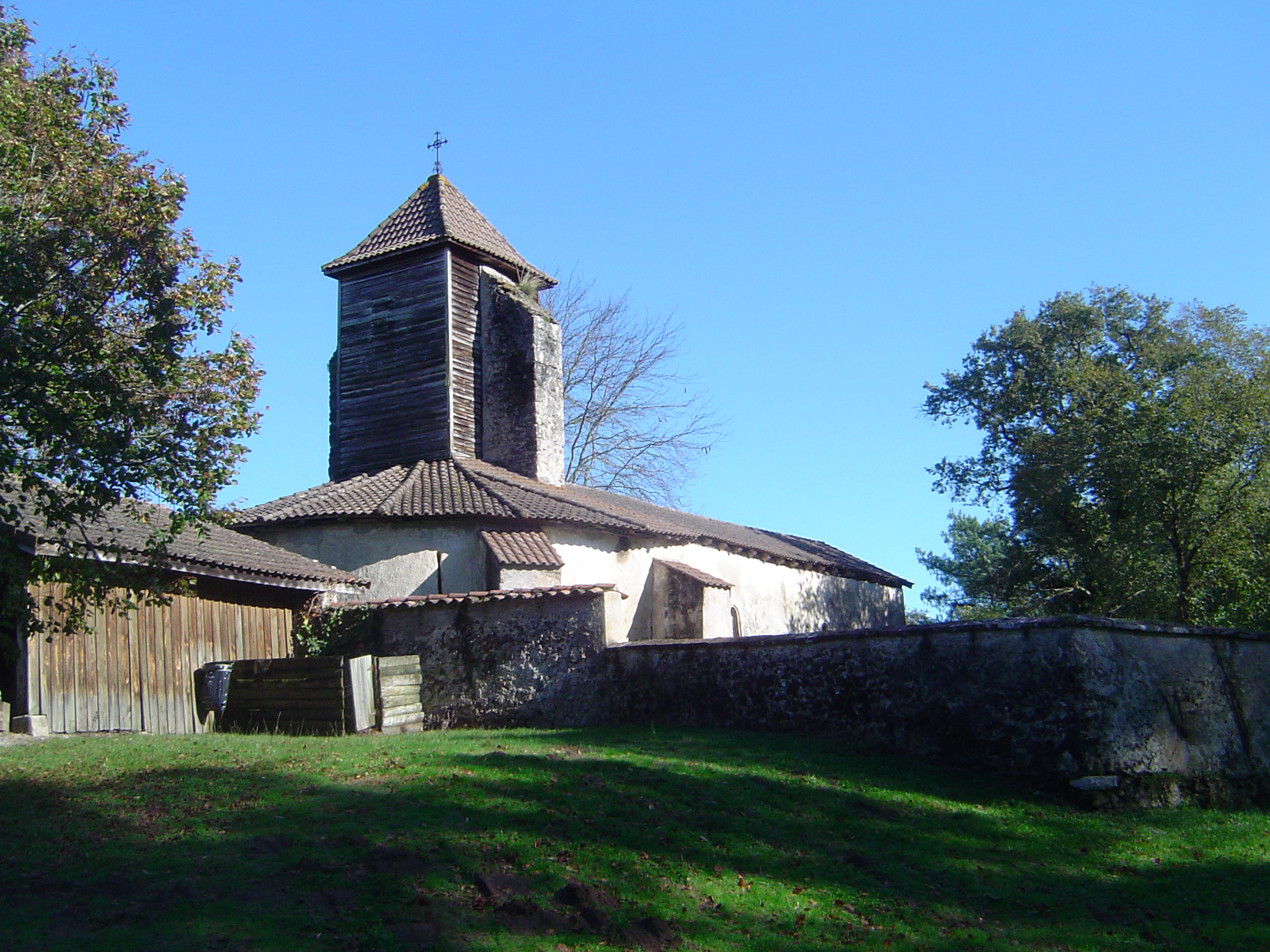
- Location of Saint-Michel-Escalus
- Location within France Location within Nouvelle-Aquitaine
- Coordinates: 43°53′37″N 1°15′36″W
- Country: France
- Region: Nouvelle-Aquitaine
- Department: Landes
- Arrondissement: Dax
- Canton: Côte d'Argent
- Intercommunality: Côte Landes Nature

Government
  - Mayor (2020–2026): Didier Clavery
- Area^{1}: 17.59 km^{2} (6.79 sq mi)
- Elevation: 10 m (33 ft)
- Highest elevation: 57 m (187 ft)
- Lowest elevation: 8 m (26 ft)
- Population (2023): 332
  - Density: 18.9/km^{2} (48.9/sq mi)
- Time zone: UTC+01:00 (CET)
  - Summer (DST): UTC+02:00 (CEST)
- INSEE/Postal code: 40276 /40550
- ^{1} French Land Register data, which excludes lakes, ponds, glaciers > 1 km^{2} (0.386 sq mi or 247 acres) and river estuaries.

Saint-Michel-Escalus (French pronunciation: [sɛ̃ miʃɛl ɛskalys]; Occitan: Sent Miquèu e Escalús) is a commune in the Landes department in Nouvelle-Aquitaine in southwestern France.

== Population ==
Historical population
Year	Pop.	±% p.a.
1968	161	—
1975	153	−0.73%
1982	134	−1.88%
1990	161	+2.32%
1999	231	+4.09%
2007	280	+2.43%
2012	293	+0.91%
2017	305	+0.81%
2023	332	+1.42%
Source: INSEE

== See also ==
- Communes of the Landes department
