= Conversations with My Gardener =

- Theatrical release poster
- Directed by: Jean Becker
- Screenplay by: Jean Becker; Jean Cosmos; Jacques Monnet
- Based on: Dialogue avec mon jardinier by Henri Cueco
- Produced by: Louis Becker
- Starring: Daniel Auteuil; Jean-Pierre Darroussin
- Cinematography: Jean-Marie Dreujou
- Edited by: Jacques Witta
- Music by: Ahmet Gülbay
- Production companies: ICE3; K.J.B. Production
- Distributed by: StudioCanal
- Release date: 6 June 2007
- Running time: 109 minutes
- Country: France
- Language: French
- Budget: $8.8 million
- Box office: $25.5 million

Conversations with My Gardener (French: Dialogue avec mon jardinier) is a 2007 French film directed by Jean Becker.

== Plot ==
A painter returns from Paris to his childhood home in rural France. The painter notices that the house's once-impressive vegetable garden has fallen into neglect, and he advertises for a gardener to put it back into shape. The gardener who responds is a former schoolmate who he hasn't seen for decades. Through his unfussy working class way of life, her allows the painter discovers the bucolic side of life and its beauty. Over the next several months, the two different men become friends through long and often witty conversations. Together they experience the world in a new light, in a slow, gentle and ultimately very moving unfolding of a relationship. The gardener's occasional stomach cramps are identified as cancer and soon he passes away. The painter takes the insights his friend has given him and shares them through an art exhibition.

== Cast ==
- Daniel Auteuil - The painter "Dupinceau"
- Jean-Pierre Darroussin : The gardener "Dujardin"
- Fanny Cottençon : Hélène, the wife of "Dupinceau"
- Élodie Navarre : Carole, the daughter of "Dupinceau"
- Alexia Barlier : Magda
- Hiam Abbass : The wife of "Dujardin"
- Nicolas Vaude : Jean-Etienne
- Roger Van Hool : Tony

== Accolades ==
Award / Film Festival	Category	Recipients and nominees	Result
César Awards	Best Actor	Jean-Pierre Darroussin	Nominated
