= Castets =

- Commune
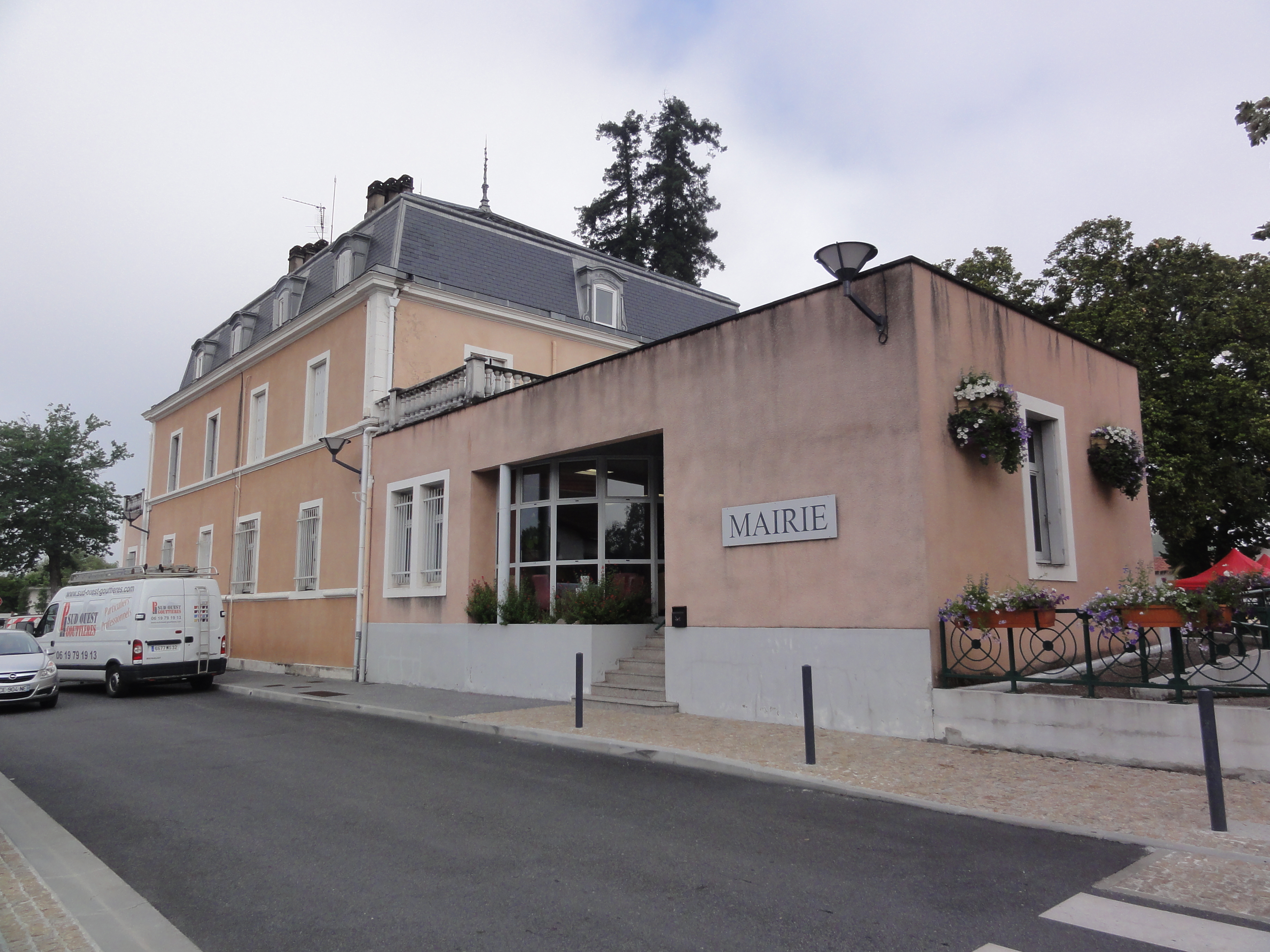
- Town hall
- Location of Castets
- Location within France Location within Nouvelle-Aquitaine
- Coordinates: 43°53′00″N 1°08′45″W
- Country: France
- Region: Nouvelle-Aquitaine
- Department: Landes
- Arrondissement: Dax
- Canton: Côte d'Argent
- Intercommunality: Côte Landes Nature

Government
  - Mayor (2020–2026): Philippe Mouhel
- Area^{1}: 90.18 km^{2} (34.82 sq mi)
- Elevation: 60 m (200 ft)
- Highest elevation: 86 m (282 ft)
- Lowest elevation: 23 m (75 ft)
- Population (2023): 2,516
  - Density: 27.90/km^{2} (72.26/sq mi)
- Time zone: UTC+01:00 (CET)
  - Summer (DST): UTC+02:00 (CEST)
- INSEE/Postal code: 40075 /40260
- ^{1} French Land Register data, which excludes lakes, ponds, glaciers > 1 km^{2} (0.386 sq mi or 247 acres) and river estuaries.

Castets (French pronunciation: [kastɛts]; Gascon: Castèths) is a commune in the Landes department in Nouvelle-Aquitaine in southwestern France.

== Population ==
Historical population

Year	Pop.	±% p.a.
1793	1,065	—
1821	1,049	−0.05%
1846	1,782	+2.14%
1872	2,081	+0.60%
1901	1,721	−0.65%
1926	1,558	−0.40%
1946	1,350	−0.71%
1962	1,499	+0.66%
1968	1,494	−0.06%

Year	Pop.	±% p.a.
1975	1,517	+0.22%
1982	1,453	−0.61%
1990	1,719	+2.12%
1999	1,808	+0.56%
2007	1,896	+0.60%
2012	1,989	+0.96%
2017	2,388	+3.72%
2023	2,516	+0.87%

Source: EHESS and INSEE (1968-2023)

== See also ==
- Communes of the Landes department
