= Linxe =

- Commune
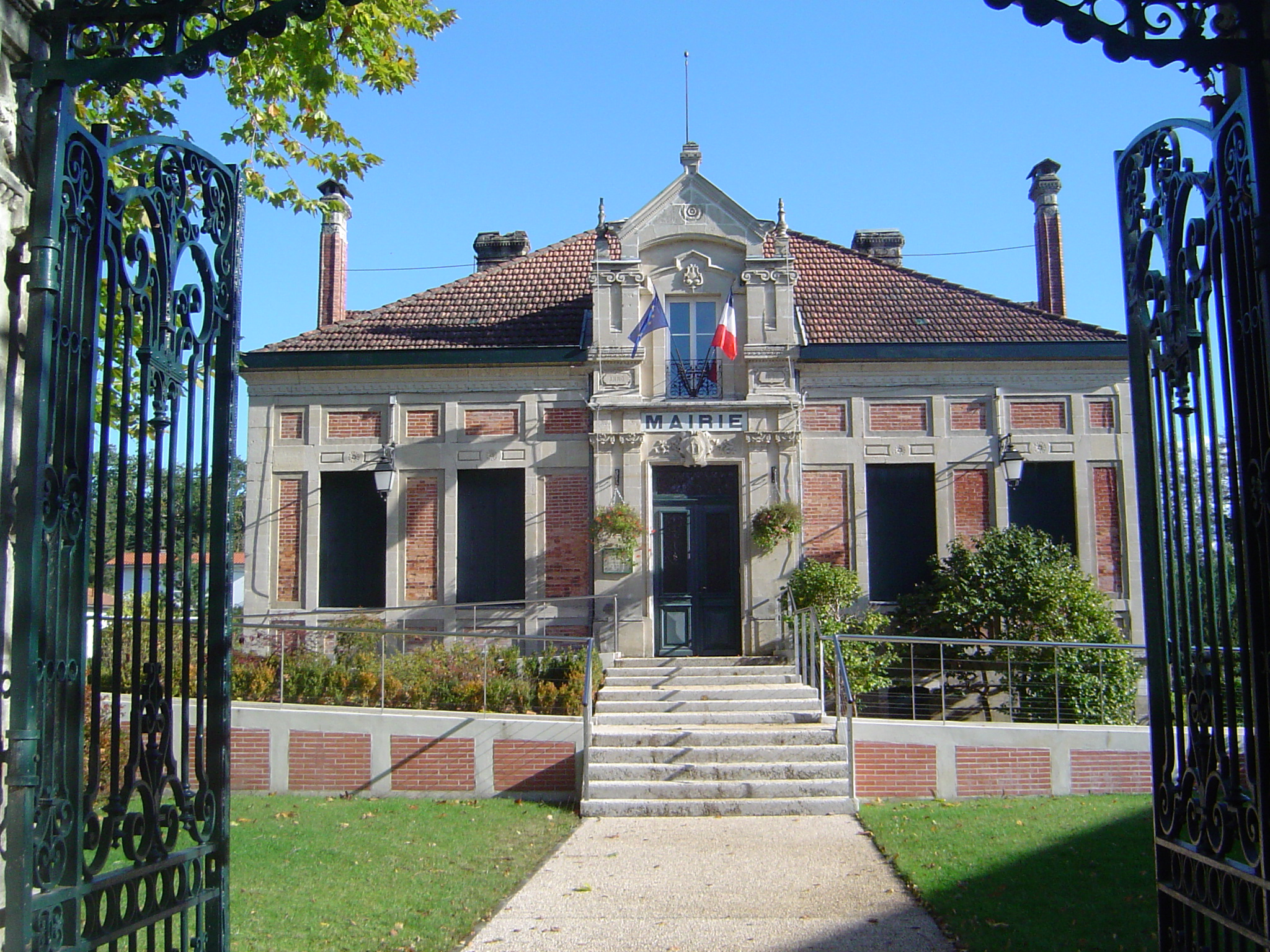
- The town hall in Linxe
- Location of Linxe
- Location within France Location within Nouvelle-Aquitaine
- Coordinates: 43°55′18″N 1°14′44″W
- Country: France
- Region: Nouvelle-Aquitaine
- Department: Landes
- Arrondissement: Dax
- Canton: Côte d'Argent
- Intercommunality: Côte Landes Nature

Government
  - Mayor (2020–2026): Thierry Gallea
- Area^{1}: 80.93 km^{2} (31.25 sq mi)
- Elevation: 33 m (108 ft)
- Highest elevation: 71 m (233 ft)
- Lowest elevation: 14 m (46 ft)
- Population (2023): 1,552
  - Density: 19.18/km^{2} (49.67/sq mi)
- Time zone: UTC+01:00 (CET)
  - Summer (DST): UTC+02:00 (CEST)
- INSEE/Postal code: 40155 /40260
- ^{1} French Land Register data, which excludes lakes, ponds, glaciers > 1 km^{2} (0.386 sq mi or 247 acres) and river estuaries.

Linxe (French pronunciation: [lɛ̃ks]; Gascon: Linça) is a commune in the Landes department in Nouvelle-Aquitaine in south-western France.

== See also ==
- Communes of the Landes department
