= Fast Track: No Limits =

- Directed by: Axel Sand
- Written by: Lee Goldberg
- Produced by: Hermann Joha
- Starring: Erin Cahill; Andrew Walker; Joseph Beattie; Alexia Barlier
- Cinematography: Axel Sand
- Edited by: Martin Rahner
- Music by: Dirk Leupolz
- Distributed by: ProSieben Media AG (Germany); Maverick Entertainment Group (United States)
- Release date: 21 February 2008 (Germany)
- Running time: 95 minutes
- Country: Germany
- Language: English

Fast Track: No Limits is a 2008 independent film directed by Axel Sand and written and produced by Lee Goldberg. It was a co-production between Action Concept and the German television network ProSiebenSat.1 The film stars Erin Cahill and Andrew Walker.

The film was shot in English, with American, British, Canadian, French, and German actors, on location in Berlin, Germany. Cars for the film were supplied by BMW, Audi, and Subaru. It aired first on ProSiebenSat.1 in February 2008, and was released theatrically in China by Beijing Time Entertainment. The film has been broadcast on television and released on DVD in dozens of countries, and it was released on DVD in the United States by Maverick Entertainment Group.

The screenplay was novelized by Lee Goldberg in 2013, though the setting was moved to the United States for the book.

== Plot ==
For four young people; Katie, Mike, Eric, Nicole; speed is a way of life. But the four soon come to realize that living life in the fast lane carries a very high price. On the streets debts are not settled with cash, they are settled in blood. Each character has a different motive and a different goal but when they get behind the wheel they are all the same. It is the speed that connects them, but the one thing they all have in common will be the one thing that tears them apart.

The film starts with a bank giving Katie, owner of Carl's Garage warning about the debt on her garage. They then order pizza for lunch which is to be delivered by Mike, a pizza delivery man. On his way to delivery his way is blocked by Nicole's broken down car and then by a police chase between Eric, a police officer and Wolf, the bank robber's wheel man making him run out of time to deliver pizzas.

On the road, Katie's Subaru is driven by a mysterious Phantom driver in the illegal racing events, earning her extra money for paying her debts. Meanwhile, in garage Mike sees Nicole's BMW which he steals to prove he is a good racer to Katie by participating and winning in illegal racing. There he races against Wolf and ultimately wins the race but wrecks the BMW.

Next day when Nicole sees what has become of her husband's car, Mike apologizes saying that a car can be fixed but one can't buy what it feels like after winning. This earns Katie Nicole's contract for building her a luxury sports car. Meanwhile, Mike is hired by Gargolov, a crime lord as a wheel man in place of Wolf.

Eric is investigating the bank robberies and discovers that Wolf is the former wheel man of Gargolov and also learns that Mike is the new one. He investigates Mike's background and learns that he is a wanted convict.

As ordered, Nicole's new sports car is made by Katie on which Mike teaches her how to race, drive and drift.

After serving as a getaway driver for Gargolov, botching the mission in the process, Mike is confronted by Eric. After an explanation of how Mike got involved and being convinced to race for Katie's sake, Mike and Eric become allies and duel against Wolf for the last time. Wolf's car crashes at the end of the race, killing him. Mike later declares his resignation to Gargolov; all four of the main characters reunite at Carl's Garage, from where they all take a drive together.

== Cast ==
- Erin Cahill as Katie Reed
- Andrew Walker as Mike Bender Cassidy
- Joseph Beattie as Eric Marc Visnjic
- Alexia Barlier as Nicole Devereaux
- Nicholas Aaron as Wolverine
- Pasquale Aleardi as Gregor Gargolov
- Maurice Roëves as Schmitty
- Jack Bence as Rainer
- Tim Dantay as Neubeck
- Ill-Young Kim as Markus
- Shaun Prendergast as Heinrich
- Carl Stück as Porsche Thief
- Anna Tkatschenko as Race Diver
