= The Forest (TV series) =

French-language crime drama TV series

- Series poster from France 3
- La Forêt
- Genre: Police drama Crime drama
- Created by: Delinda Jacobs
- Directed by: Julius Berg
- Country of origin: France
- Original language: French
- No. of seasons: 1
- No. of episodes: 6

Production
- Running time: 52 min.

Original release
- Network: France 3 La Une (Belgium)
- Release: 30 May – 14 June 2017

The Forest (French: La Forêt) is a French crime drama television series, created by Delinda Jacobs and directed by Julius Berg. It debuted 30 May 2017 on Belgian channel La Une and on 21 November on France 3. The series debuted on Netflix internationally in July 2018.

== Synopsis ==
Police investigate after a teenaged girl, Jennifer Lenoir, disappears in a forest in the Ardennes, Belgium, and are assisted by her teacher, who had a traumatic experience in the same forest when she was young.

== Cast ==
- Samuel Labarthe as Gaspard Decker, a new-in-town detective heading the investigation into Jennifer's disappearance
- Suzanne Clément as Virginie Musso, a locally raised law enforcement officer investigating Jennifer's disappearance; wife of Vincent and adoptive parent of Maya.
- Alexia Barlier as Ève Mendel, an eccentric teacher concerned by Jennifer's disappearance; adopted daughter of Abraham
- Frédéric Diefenthal as Vincent Musso, Virginie's husband and Maya's adoptive parent who's having a secret sexual affair with Jennifer
- Patrick Ridremont as Thierry Rouget, an alcoholic ex-convict responsible for the arson of Mendel's home killing Abraham's wife, Marie, and son, Nathan; father of Ocèane
- Nicolas Marié as Gilles Lopez, the principal at the highschool the girls attend
- Martha Canga Antonio as Maya Musso, Virginie and Vincent's adopted daughter who had a feud with Jennifer before she disappeared
- François Neycken as Julien
- Gilles Vandeweerd as Philippe
- Mélusine Loveniers as Lola Decker, Gaspard's daughter
- Christian Crahay as Dr Abraham Mendel, Eve's adopted father
- Inès Bally as Océane Rouget, Thierry's daughter who eventually also goes missing
- Isis Guillaume as Jennifer Lenoir, a sixteen-year-old girl whose disappearance instigates an investigation
- Gaëtan Lejeune as Manoa Willem, a wildman living in the forest; abused as a child
- Anne-Pascale Clairembourg as Audrey Rinkert

== Episodes ==
No.	Title	Directed by	Written by
1	"Episode 1"	Julius Berg	Delinda Jacobs
When Jennifer, 16, disappears in the woods around the quiet village of Montfaucon, her best friends, Océane and Maya, seem at first unconcerned. Maya is accused of writing a threatening message on Jennifer's locker. Their mysterious teacher Ève Mendel receives a panicked call from Jennifer before it was disconnected. Lieutenant Virginie Musso (Maya's adoptive mother) and Captain Decker investigate and discover other strange occurrences in the forest, including the unsolved case of two missing women, camper Louise Martin, who disappeared in 2005, and schoolgirl Mélanie Krootz, who disappeared in 2006. Ève also has a strange history with the forest, having been found there as a 6-year-old child injured and with no memory of what happened to her. Jennifer's clothes arrive in the mail at the Musso house, addressed to Virginie.
2	"Episode 2"	Julius Berg	Delinda Jacobs
Maya confronts her father, Vincent, about his affair with Jennifer, which she uncovered. He claims it was a horrible mistake and was over. A map is found on Ève's windshield that leads to Jennifer's body, buried naked in the forest surrounded by a makeshift shrine. An autopsy determines she was raped and murdered. CCTV footage leads them to believe Jennifer was first raped and mailed her own clothes to Virginie as evidence before her disappearance. The police first suspect Thierry, when they find blood residue in his kitchen and arrest him. After Ève enters the interrogation, he is cleared when it is revealed the blood came from his daughter, Océane, whom he had abused. Océane and Maya suddenly vanish, their phones shut off like Jennifer's was. A local man, Manoa Willem, is found at Jennifer's grave and attacks a police officer in the forest. He had grown up like a hermit in the forest before eventually killing his father at age 17, and spent seven years in an institution, and was released three weeks before the first girl disappeared a decade earlier. Diagnosed autistic, Manoa only says the name "Joe" and draws spirals in response to police questioning.
3	"Episode 3"	Julius Berg	Delinda Jacobs
Ève follows a white wolf in the forest and discovers Manoa's dwelling, with female undergarments and a doll. Virginie doesn't recognize them as belonging to Maya. They discover all three girls had been visiting an internet cafe, usually together, where they chatted with the same individual. It is found that Manoa is not a DNA match to the semen found on Jennifer's body and clothes. A video reveals the teens had been auctioning off their virginity. Ève sees old video tape of her as a child after she was found, acting feral and playing with a similar doll as the one found in Manoa's cabin. Manoa escapes from police custody, attacking Virginie in the process, and breaks into Ève's home. He points to a photo of Jennifer and calls her "Joe" and indicates the other two girls are in the forest. Ève drives with him to the forest, but when Manoa is startled by a car, he jumps on her and covers her mouth. She escapes and drives away. Vincent sneaks into the police station to take the DNA sample police took from him in a mass screening of local men, but can't locate his. Ève tells Decker of the video from her taking by the psychiatrist who adopted her and that she had drawn the same spirals Manoa was drawing. They go to her home and discover the tapes burned and Manoa's body, hanging from the roof.
4	"Episode 4"	Julius Berg	Delinda Jacobs
Manoa's death appears to be a suicide, but Decker wonders if he had an accomplice who killed him. Vincent is arrested after the DNA test results come back. He admits to having unprotected sex with Jennifer the day she disappeared but denies raping or killing her. He claims he broke up with her and the reason she sent her clothes to Virginie was to get revenge. The police arrest a man they tracked online who hired Océane as a prostitute, and he claims she is alive and with Maya, and they will be at a two-day party. The police locate Océane but the girl she is with isn't Maya. Océane admits talking Maya into prostitution as well, but Maya backed out at the last moment. Ève searches the forest and finds a cave with children's clothing and the spirals carved into rock. She thinks as a child, before she was found, Manoa took care of her in the cave. Autopsy results confirm Manoa was murdered, and Decker suspects he was a witness to the actual murder and is the one who led police to Jennifer's body. Ève follows another white wolf and discovers bones in a shallow grave.
5	"Episode 5"	Julius Berg	Delinda Jacobs
Two sets of bones are unearthed, one of which belonged to Mélanie Krootz, the missing schoolgirl. The other skeleton was buried much earlier and belonged to a woman who had given birth, and DNA confirms it was Ève's mother. Someone abducts Ève and attempts to kill her, but she is saved by Océane's father, Thierry, who is arrested after police discover he had been burglarizing homes. Océane comes to stay with Ève and her father. Someone vandalizes the high school and steals old photos from a display case. Ève tracks down photos of the display case and discovers the principal, Mr. Lopez, in an Olympic team jacket (Jeux Olympiques) and realizes that he is "JO."
6	"Episode 6"	Julius Berg	Delinda Jacobs
Police raid Lopez's house and discover a video message from Maya for Virginie, pleading with her to follow Lopez's instructions. An airline ticket is visible in a jacket behind Maya in the video, and Virginie races to Lille to intercept Lopez and his captive. Decker realizes the video was a trick and that Lopez is attempting to escape to Belgium by driving through the Ardennes, following an old smuggling route. In the Ardennes, Maya escapes and Lopez is arrested.

== Production ==
The Forest was shot mostly in the Belgian region of Wallonia around Brussels, as well as Dinant, Namur, Rixensart and Court-Saint-Étienne. Filming also took place in France in the Ardennes, particularly around the River Meuse and communes of Haybes and Fumay. The final sequence was shot in Bray-Dunes near Dunkirk.
