= Lit-et-Mixe =

- Commune
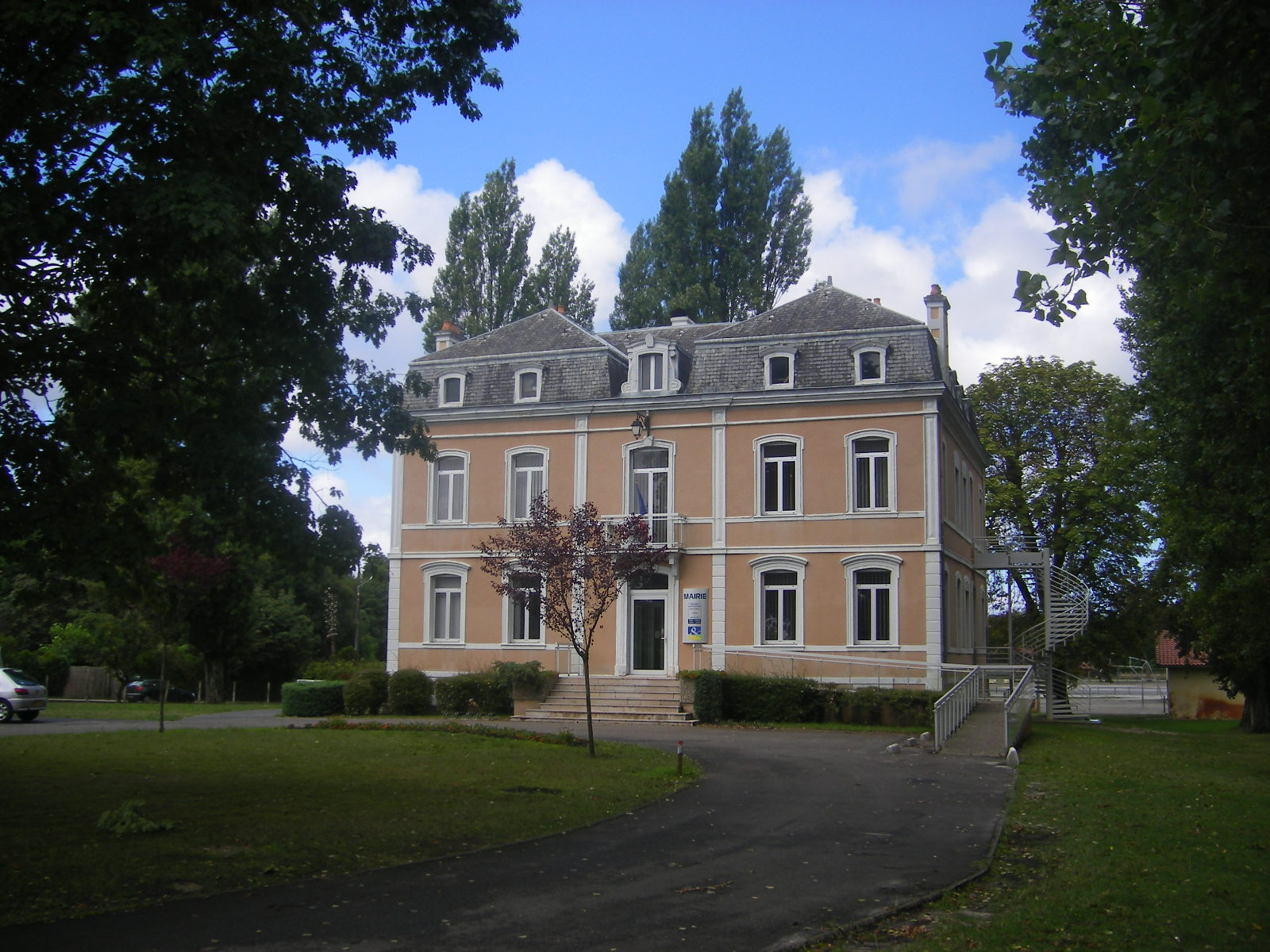
- The town hall in Lit-et-Mixe

- Coat of arms
- Location of Lit-et-Mixe
- Location within France Location within Nouvelle-Aquitaine
- Coordinates: 44°02′00″N 1°15′20″W
- Country: France
- Region: Nouvelle-Aquitaine
- Department: Landes
- Arrondissement: Dax
- Canton: Côte d'Argent
- Intercommunality: Côte Landes Nature

Government
  - Mayor (2020–2026): Gérard Napias
- Area^{1}: 112.95 km^{2} (43.61 sq mi)
- Elevation: 7 m (23 ft)
- Highest elevation: 72 m (236 ft)
- Lowest elevation: 0 m (0 ft)
- Population (2023): 1,719
  - Density: 15.22/km^{2} (39.42/sq mi)
- Time zone: UTC+01:00 (CET)
  - Summer (DST): UTC+02:00 (CEST)
- INSEE/Postal code: 40157 /40170
- ^{1} French Land Register data, which excludes lakes, ponds, glaciers > 1 km^{2} (0.386 sq mi or 247 acres) and river estuaries.

Lit-et-Mixe (French pronunciation: [lit e miks]; Gascon: Lit e Micse) is a commune in the Landes department in Nouvelle-Aquitaine in south-western France.

The François Ozon film Sous le sable was set in Lit-et-Mixe.

== See also ==
- Communes of the Landes department
