= Lévignacq =

- Commune
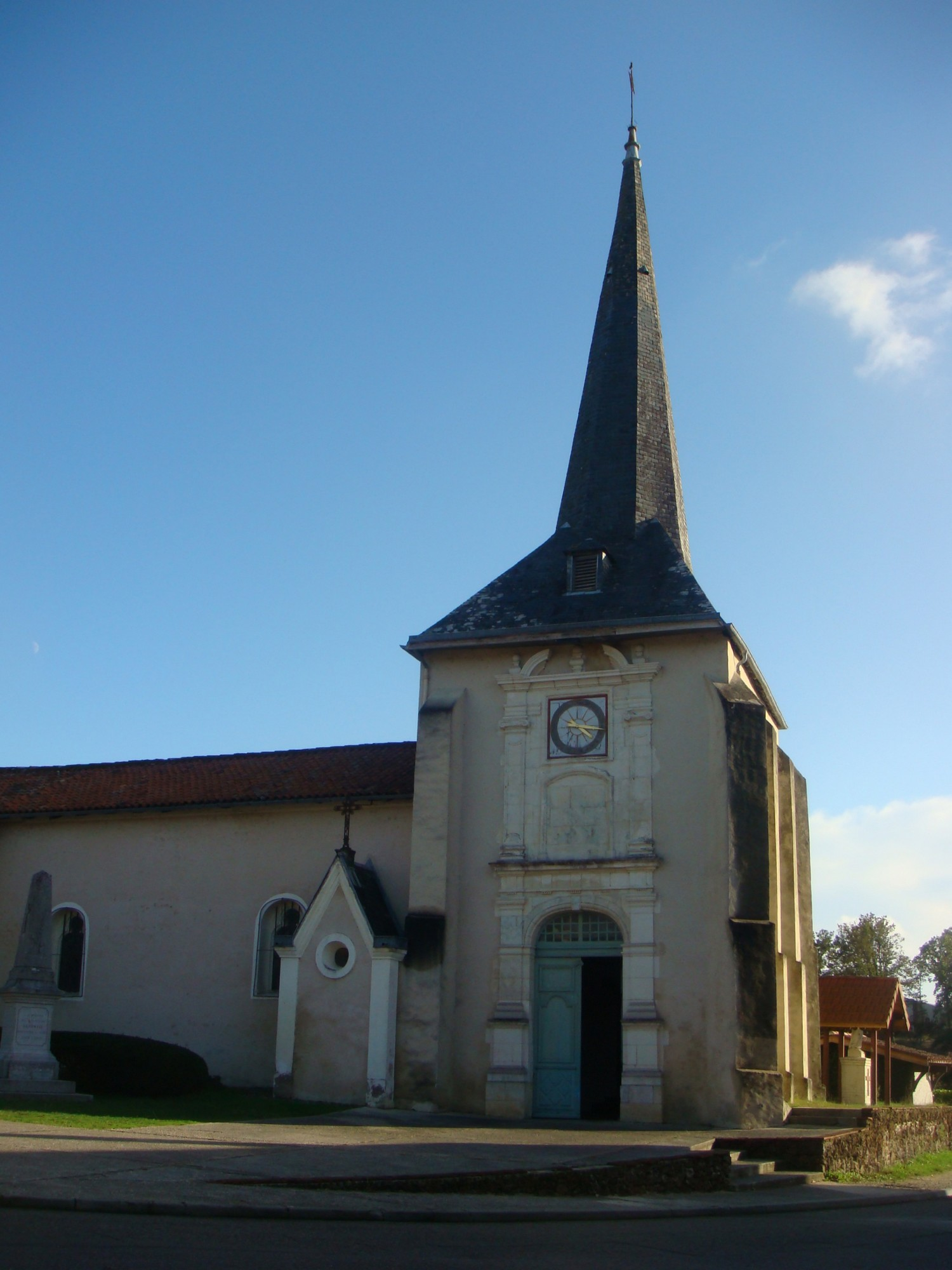
- The church in Lévignacq
- Location of Lévignacq
- Location within France Location within Nouvelle-Aquitaine
- Coordinates: 44°00′22″N 1°09′59″W
- Country: France
- Region: Nouvelle-Aquitaine
- Department: Landes
- Arrondissement: Dax
- Canton: Côte d'Argent
- Intercommunality: Côte Landes Nature

Government
  - Mayor (2020–2026): Jean-Claude Caule
- Area^{1}: 42.32 km^{2} (16.34 sq mi)
- Elevation: 30 m (98 ft)
- Highest elevation: 75 m (246 ft)
- Lowest elevation: 27 m (89 ft)
- Population (2023): 362
  - Density: 8.55/km^{2} (22.2/sq mi)
- Time zone: UTC+01:00 (CET)
  - Summer (DST): UTC+02:00 (CEST)
- INSEE/Postal code: 40154 /40170
- ^{1} French Land Register data, which excludes lakes, ponds, glaciers > 1 km^{2} (0.386 sq mi or 247 acres) and river estuaries.

Lévignacq (French pronunciation: [leviɲak]; Occitan: Lo Binhac) is a commune in the Landes department in Nouvelle-Aquitaine in south-western France.

== See also ==
- Communes of the Landes department
