= Pontenx-les-Forges =

- Commune
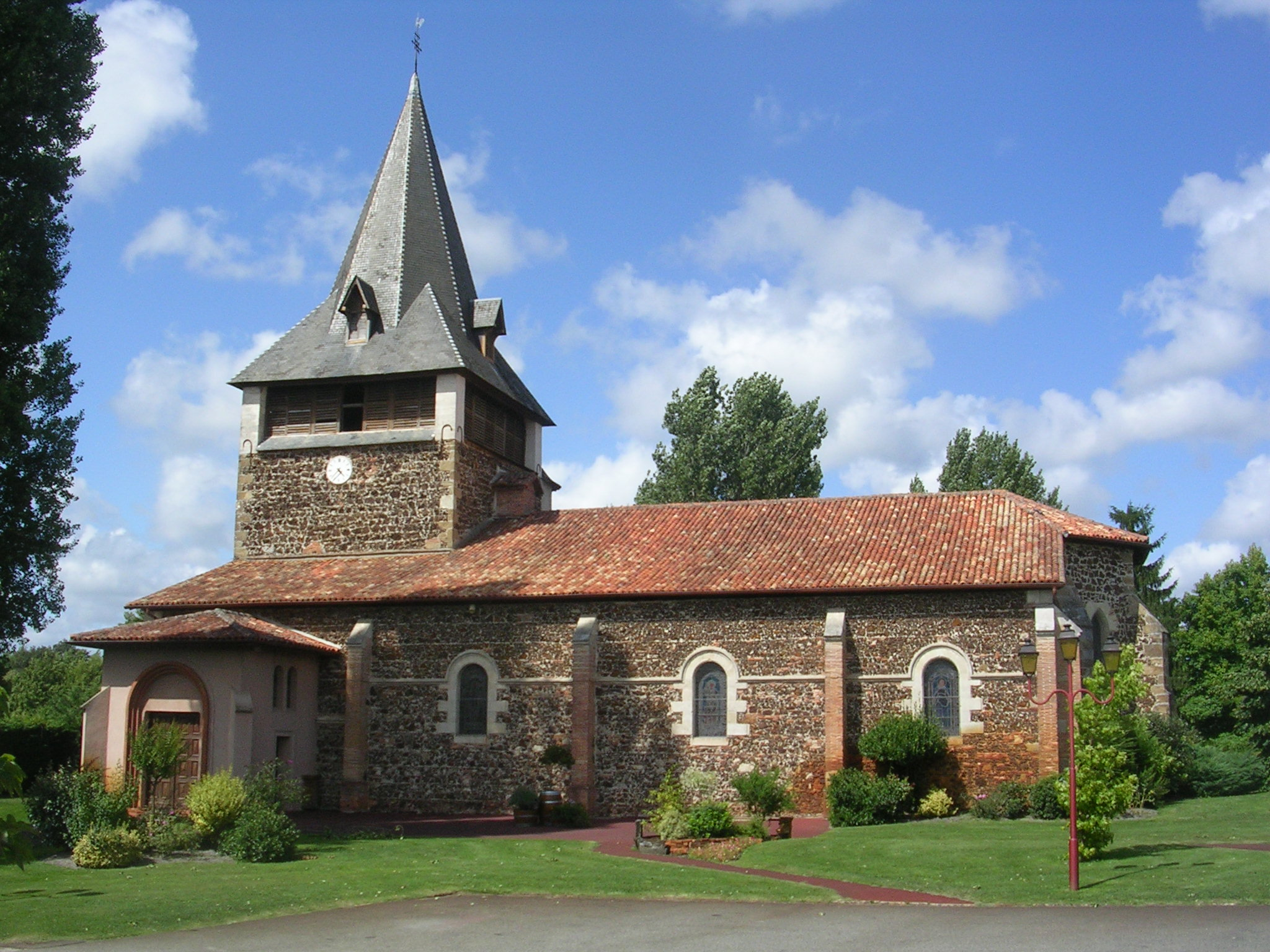
- Church of Saint-Martin

- Coat of arms
- Location of Pontenx-les-Forges
- Location within France Location within Nouvelle-Aquitaine
- Coordinates: 44°14′30″N 1°07′13″W
- Country: France
- Region: Nouvelle-Aquitaine
- Department: Landes
- Arrondissement: Mont-de-Marsan
- Canton: Côte d'Argent
- Intercommunality: Mimizan

Government
  - Mayor (2020–2026): Henri-Jean Thébault
- Area^{1}: 80.62 km^{2} (31.13 sq mi)
- Highest elevation: 56 m (184 ft)
- Lowest elevation: 9 m (30 ft)
- Population (2023): 1,775
  - Density: 22.02/km^{2} (57.02/sq mi)
- Time zone: UTC+01:00 (CET)
  - Summer (DST): UTC+02:00 (CEST)
- INSEE/Postal code: 40229 /40200
- ^{1} French Land Register data, which excludes lakes, ponds, glaciers > 1 km^{2} (0.386 sq mi or 247 acres) and river estuaries.

Pontenx-les-Forges (French pronunciation: [pɔ̃tɛ̃ks le fɔʁʒ]; Occitan: Pontens) is a commune in the Landes department in Nouvelle-Aquitaine in southwestern France.

== Population ==
Historical population
Year	Pop.	±% p.a.
1968	1,218	—
1975	1,223	+0.06%
1982	1,192	−0.37%
1990	1,138	−0.58%
1999	1,086	−0.52%
2007	1,357	+2.82%
2012	1,499	+2.01%
2017	1,596	+1.26%
2023	1,775	+1.79%
Source: INSEE

== See also ==
- Communes of the Landes department
