= Saint-Paul-en-Born =

- Commune
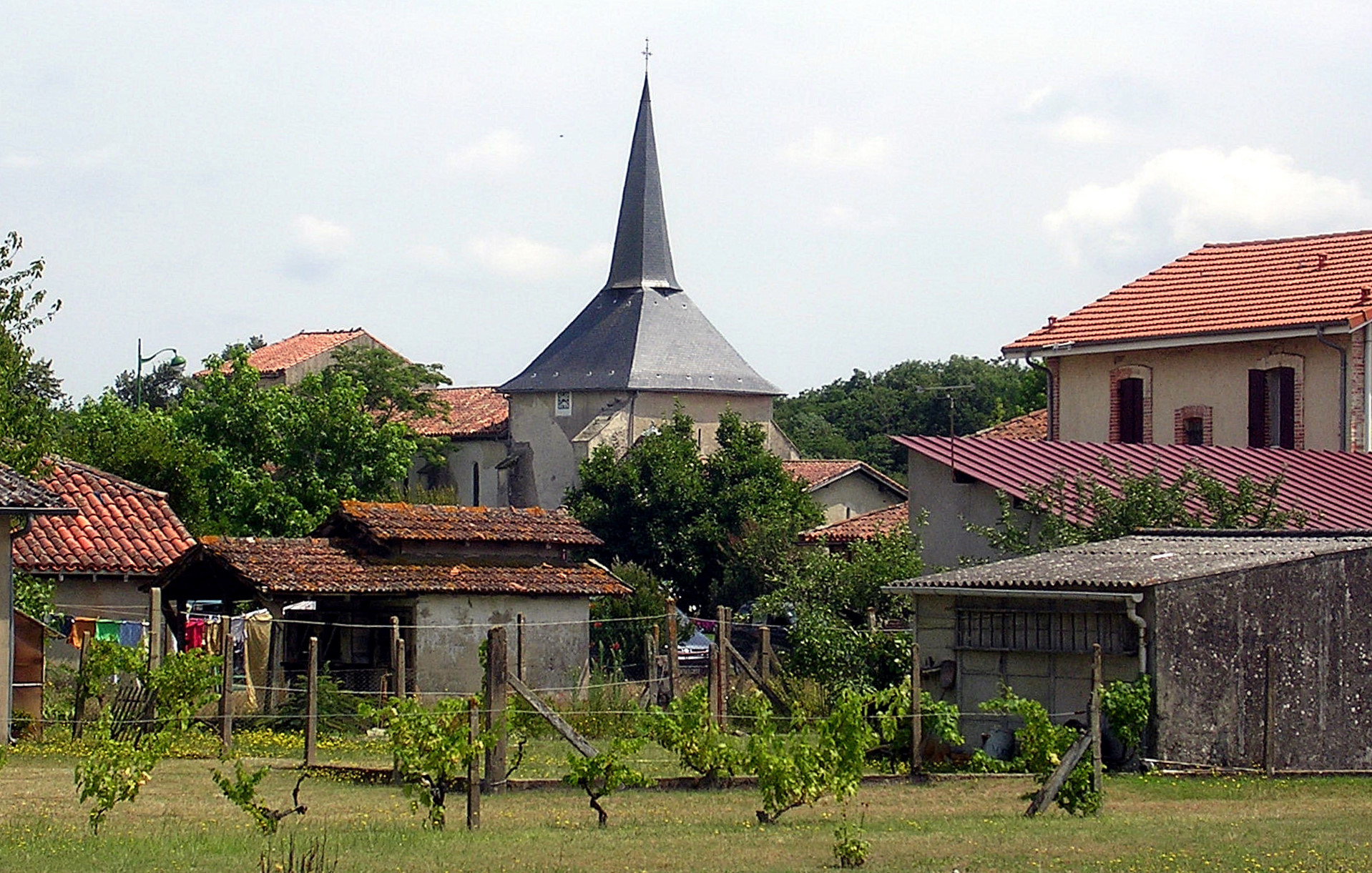
- Location of Saint-Paul-en-Born
- Location within France Location within Nouvelle-Aquitaine
- Coordinates: 44°13′31″N 1°09′05″W
- Country: France
- Region: Nouvelle-Aquitaine
- Department: Landes
- Arrondissement: Mont-de-Marsan
- Canton: Côte d'Argent
- Intercommunality: Mimizan

Government
  - Mayor (2020–2026): Éliane Pujos
- Area^{1}: 43.53 km^{2} (16.81 sq mi)
- Elevation: 15 m (49 ft)
- Highest elevation: 54 m (177 ft)
- Lowest elevation: 6 m (20 ft)
- Population (2023): 975
  - Density: 22.4/km^{2} (58.0/sq mi)
- Time zone: UTC+01:00 (CET)
  - Summer (DST): UTC+02:00 (CEST)
- INSEE/Postal code: 40278 /40200
- ^{1} French Land Register data, which excludes lakes, ponds, glaciers > 1 km^{2} (0.386 sq mi or 247 acres) and river estuaries.

Saint-Paul-en-Born (French pronunciation: [sɛ̃ pɔl ɑ̃ bɔʁn]; Gascon: Sent Pau de Bòrn) is a commune in the Landes department in Nouvelle-Aquitaine in southwestern France.

== Population ==
Historical population
Year	Pop.	±% p.a.
1968	433	—
1975	477	+1.39%
1982	460	−0.52%
1990	597	+3.31%
1999	602	+0.09%
2007	750	+2.79%
2012	840	+2.29%
2017	956	+2.62%
2023	975	+0.33%
Source: INSEE
