= Mézos =

- Commune
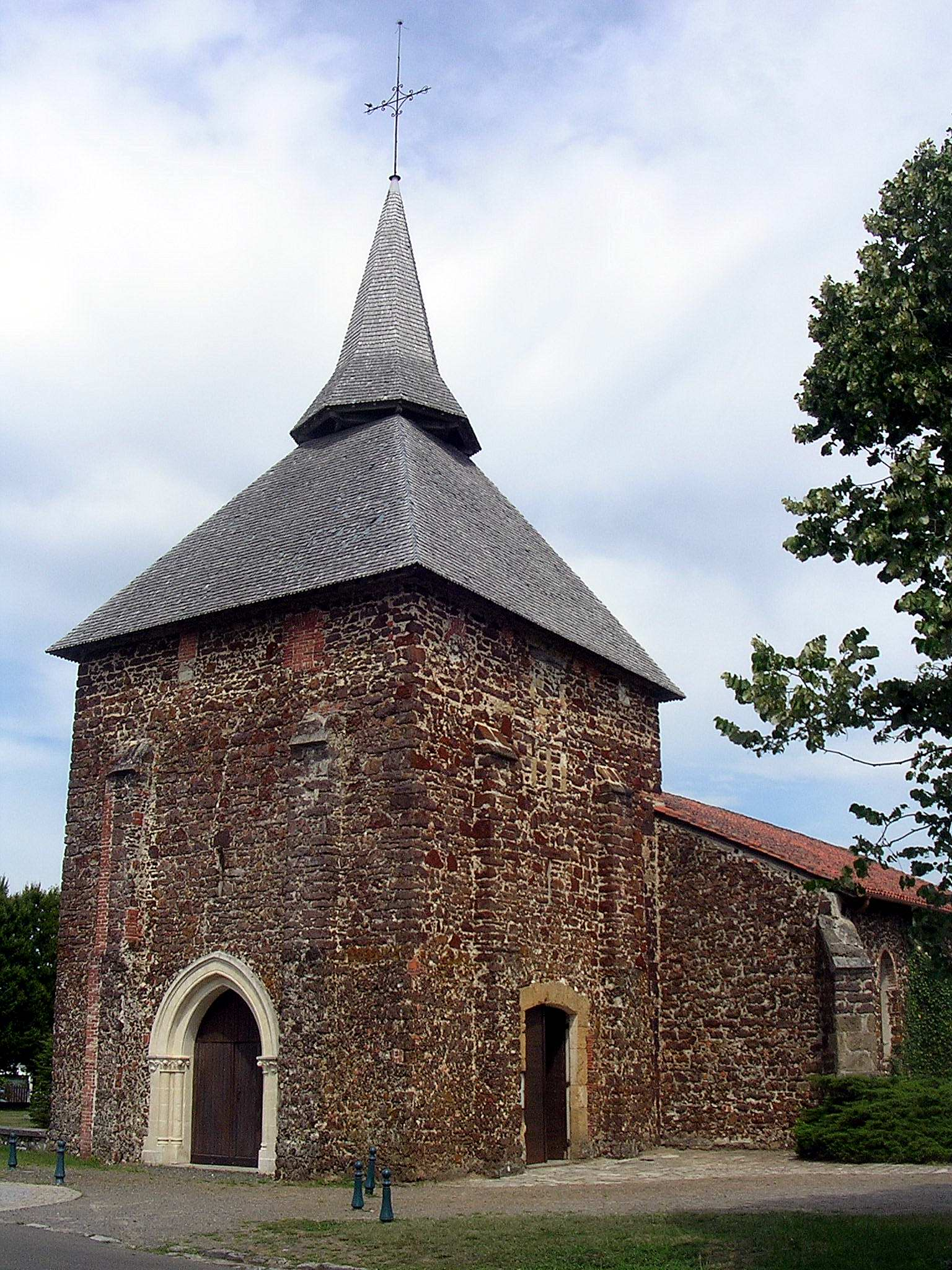
- Saint-Jean-Baptiste church
- Location of Mézos
- Location within France Location within Nouvelle-Aquitaine
- Coordinates: 44°04′38″N 1°09′48″W
- Country: France
- Region: Nouvelle-Aquitaine
- Department: Landes
- Arrondissement: Mont-de-Marsan
- Canton: Côte d'Argent

Government
  - Mayor (2020–2026): Gilles Ferdani
- Area^{1}: 89.05 km^{2} (34.38 sq mi)
- Elevation: 23 m (75 ft)
- Highest elevation: 72 m (236 ft)
- Lowest elevation: 12 m (39 ft)
- Population (2023): 868
  - Density: 9.75/km^{2} (25.2/sq mi)
- Time zone: UTC+01:00 (CET)
  - Summer (DST): UTC+02:00 (CEST)
- INSEE/Postal code: 40182 /40170
- ^{1} French Land Register data, which excludes lakes, ponds, glaciers > 1 km^{2} (0.386 sq mi or 247 acres) and river estuaries.

Mézos (French pronunciation: [mezɔs]; Occitan: Mesòs) is a commune in the Landes department in Nouvelle-Aquitaine in south-western France.

== See also ==
- Communes of the Landes department
