= Aureilhan, Landes =

Aureilhan
- Commune
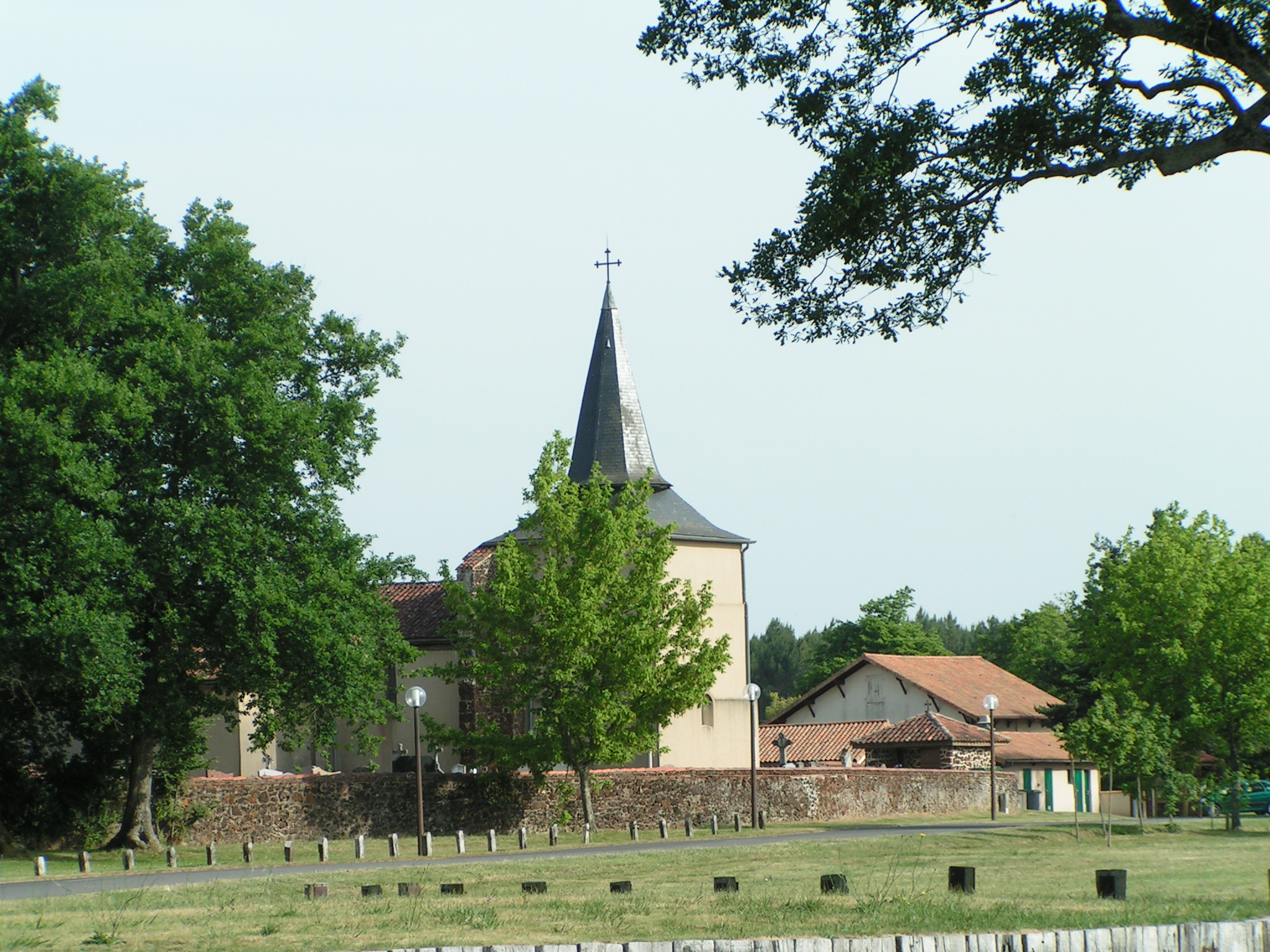
- The church of Aureilhan
- Location of Aureilhan
- Location within France Location within Nouvelle-Aquitaine
- Coordinates: 44°13′15″N 1°12′13″W
- Country: France
- Region: Nouvelle-Aquitaine
- Department: Landes
- Arrondissement: Mont-de-Marsan
- Canton: Côte d'Argent
- Intercommunality: CC Mimizan

Government
  - Mayor (2020–2026): Jean-Richard Saint-Jours
- Area^{1}: 11.51 km^{2} (4.44 sq mi)
- Elevation: 10 m (33 ft)
- Highest elevation: 34 m (112 ft)
- Lowest elevation: 5 m (16 ft)
- Population (2023): 1,146
  - Density: 99.57/km^{2} (257.9/sq mi)
- Time zone: UTC+01:00 (CET)
  - Summer (DST): UTC+02:00 (CEST)
- INSEE/Postal code: 40019 /40200
- ^{1} French Land Register data, which excludes lakes, ponds, glaciers > 1 km^{2} (0.386 sq mi or 247 acres) and river estuaries.

Aureilhan (French pronunciation: [oʁɛjɑ̃]; Occitan: Aurelhan) is a commune of the Landes department in Nouvelle-Aquitaine in southwestern France.

== Population ==
Historical population
Year	Pop.	±% p.a.
1968	452	—
1975	482	+0.92%
1982	504	+0.64%
1990	562	+1.37%
1999	640	+1.45%
2007	858	+3.73%
2012	1,012	+3.36%
2017	1,064	+1.01%
2023	1,146	+1.25%
Source: INSEE

== See also ==
- Communes of the Landes department
