= Uza, Landes =

Uza
- Commune
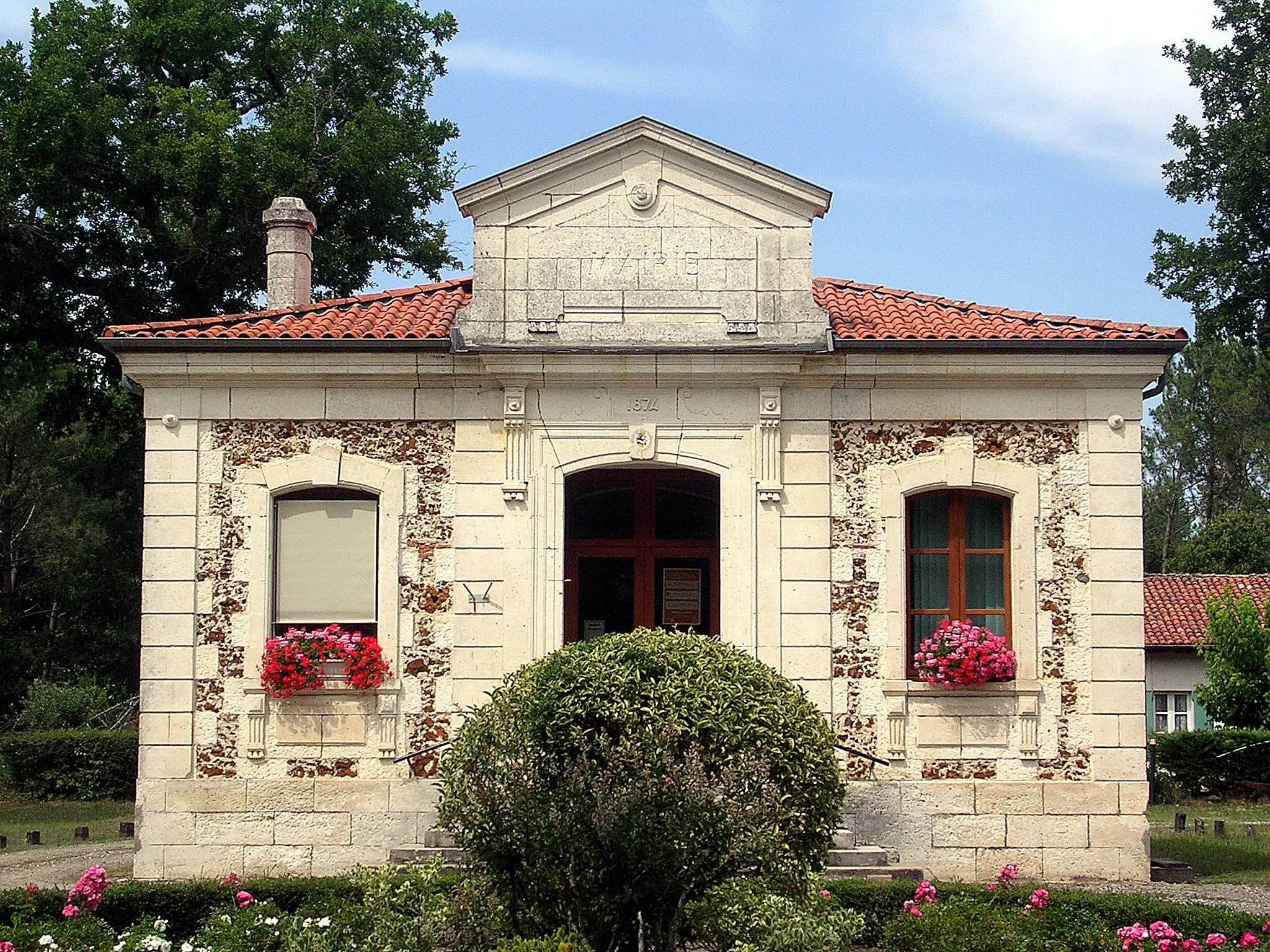
- Town hall
- Location of Uza
- Location within France Location within Nouvelle-Aquitaine
- Coordinates: 44°02′02″N 1°11′57″W
- Country: France
- Region: Nouvelle-Aquitaine
- Department: Landes
- Arrondissement: Dax
- Canton: Côte d'Argent
- Intercommunality: Côte Landes Nature

Government
  - Mayor (2020–2026): Jean-Jacques Leblond
- Area^{1}: 12.88 km^{2} (4.97 sq mi)
- Elevation: 10 m (33 ft)
- Highest elevation: 44 m (144 ft)
- Lowest elevation: 12 m (39 ft)
- Population (2023): 180
  - Density: 14/km^{2} (36/sq mi)
- Time zone: UTC+01:00 (CET)
  - Summer (DST): UTC+02:00 (CEST)
- INSEE/Postal code: 40322 /40170
- ^{1} French Land Register data, which excludes lakes, ponds, glaciers > 1 km^{2} (0.386 sq mi or 247 acres) and river estuaries.

Uza (French pronunciation: [yza]; Occitan: Husar) is a commune in the Landes department in Nouvelle-Aquitaine in southwestern France.

== Population ==
Historical population
Year	Pop.	±% p.a.
1968	313	—
1975	307	−0.28%
1982	234	−3.80%
1990	184	−2.96%
1999	160	−1.54%
2007	160	+0.00%
2012	159	−0.13%
2017	195	+4.17%
2023	180	−1.33%
Source: INSEE

== See also ==
- Communes of the Landes department
