= La Dernière Vague =

2019 French TV series

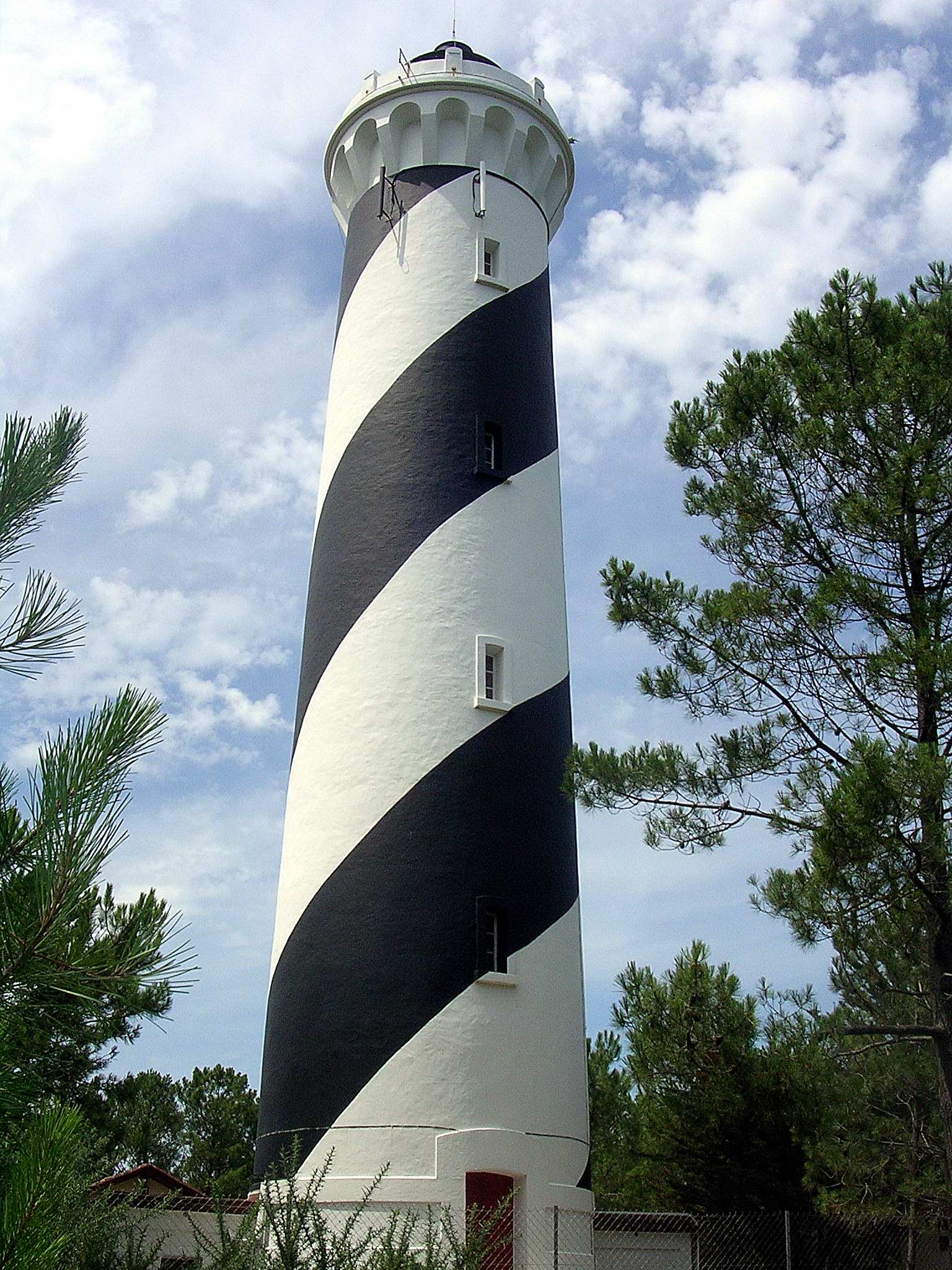
The inland lighthouse at Contis features in the plot

La Dernière Vague (English: The Last Wave) is a 2019 French television series, from Kwaï Television, Paris, in French with six episodes.

== Premise ==
The setting is the coast of Landes in southwestern France. Eleven surfers are lost in freak weather connected with an unusual cloud. They return, but with mysterious changes and unexplained powers.

== Production ==
The series was filmed around Contis, near St Julien-en-Born, where there is a distinctive inland lighthouse that features as a significant plot point.

== International broadcasts ==
A version given the English title of The Last Wave, dubbed into German by Leonine Distribution (de), Munich, was broadcast by ZDFneo from 26 June 2020.

Another version, also using The Last Wave title, keeping the French audio with subtitles in English, began on 25 July 2020 on BBC 4. Ed Power, writing for The Telegraph, summarized it thus: "supernatural clouds and sexy surfers". This version also started streaming in Australia on SBS On Demand in 2021.
