= Contis =

Beach resort

Coordinates: 44°5′32″N 1°19′15″W

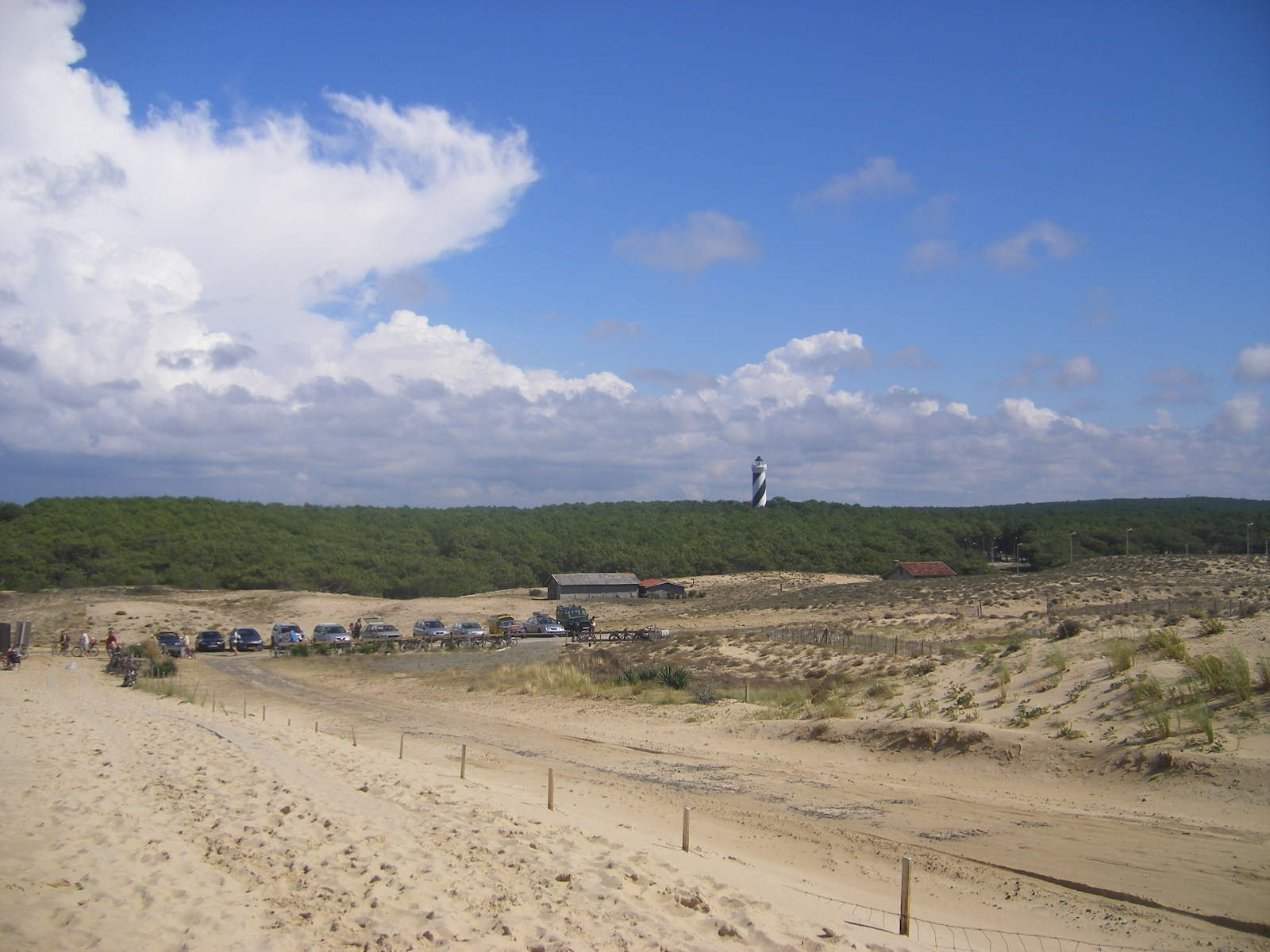
Contis' beach; the lighthouse in the background

Contis is a village, part of the commune of Saint-Julien-en-Born, in the Landes département of southwest France, on the Atlantic Ocean, which has an extensive beach, Contis Plage.

== Overview ==
The wide beach of fine sand is popular with sunbathers, swimmers and surfers.

A local landmark is Contis Lighthouse (Contis Phare). The lighthouse stands 38 metres high and has 192 steps. It is painted white with a spiralling dark stripe, like a sucre d'orge. It is the only lighthouse from Capbreton to Cap Ferret.

Contis village also has shops and services fulfilling the needs of holidaymakers.

The French television drama series La Dernière Vague was filmed around Contis, making use of the distinctive lighthouse.

== See also ==
- Courant de Contis
- Saint-Julien-en-Born
