= Saint-Julien-en-Born =

- Commune
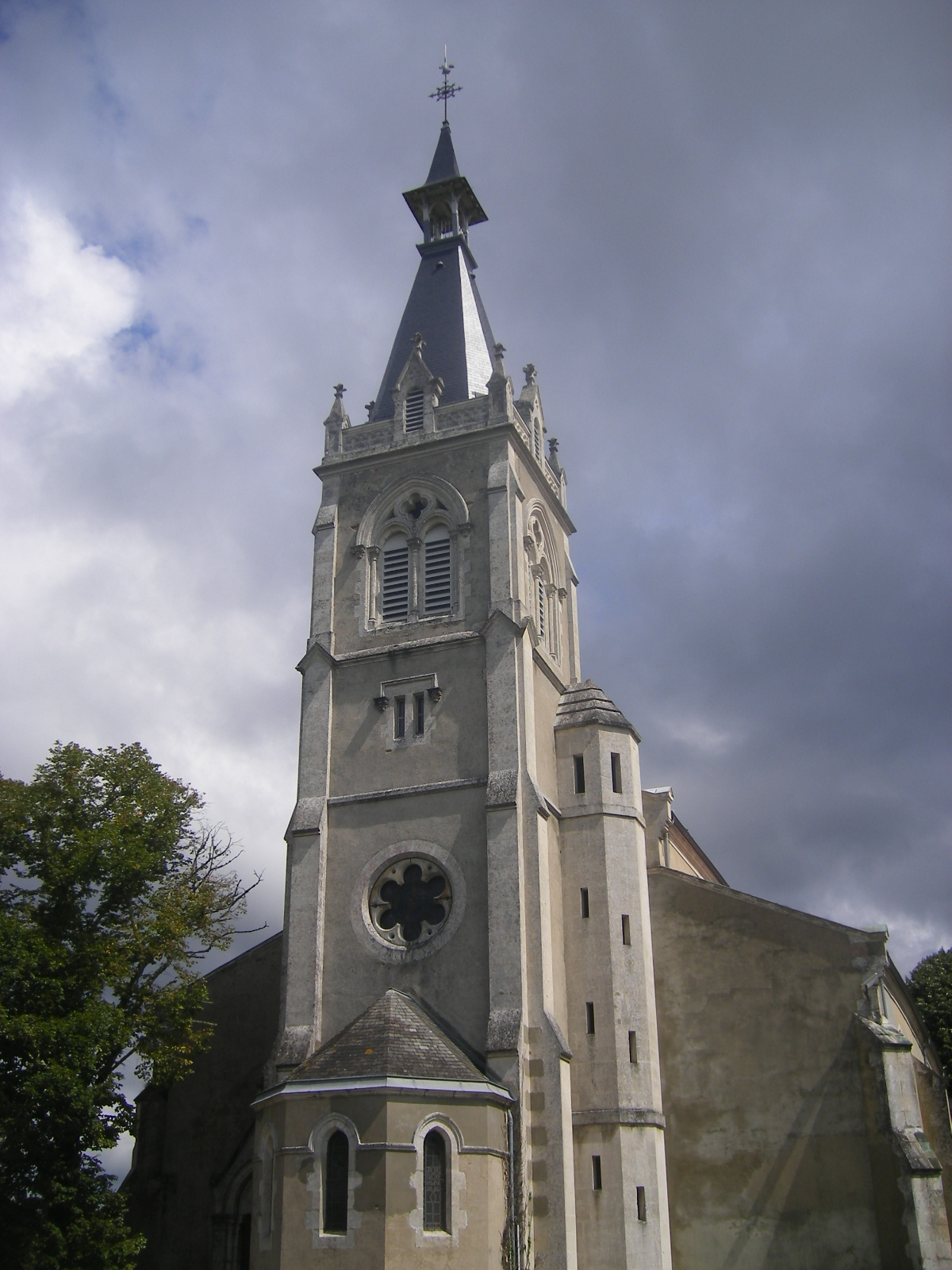
- Location of Saint-Julien-en-Born
- Location within France Location within Nouvelle-Aquitaine
- Coordinates: 44°03′49″N 1°13′27″W
- Country: France
- Region: Nouvelle-Aquitaine
- Department: Landes
- Arrondissement: Dax
- Canton: Côte d'Argent
- Intercommunality: Côte Landes Nature

Government
  - Mayor (2020–2026): Gilles Ducout
- Area^{1}: 72.93 km^{2} (28.16 sq mi)
- Elevation: 20 m (66 ft)
- Highest elevation: 64 m (210 ft)
- Lowest elevation: 0 m (0 ft)
- Population (2023): 1,781
  - Density: 24.42/km^{2} (63.25/sq mi)
- Time zone: UTC+01:00 (CET)
  - Summer (DST): UTC+02:00 (CEST)
- INSEE/Postal code: 40266 /40170
- ^{1} French Land Register data, which excludes lakes, ponds, glaciers > 1 km^{2} (0.386 sq mi or 247 acres) and river estuaries.

Saint-Julien-en-Born (French pronunciation: [sɛ̃ ʒyljɛ̃ ɑ̃ bɔʁn]; Gascon: Sent Julian de Bòrn) is a commune in the Landes department in Nouvelle-Aquitaine in southwestern France.

== Population ==
Historical population
Year	Pop.	±% p.a.
1968	1,232	—
1975	1,217	−0.17%
1982	1,187	−0.36%
1990	1,285	+1.00%
1999	1,316	+0.27%
2007	1,415	+0.91%
2012	1,530	+1.58%
2017	1,643	+1.44%
2023	1,781	+1.35%
Source: INSEE

== See also ==
- Communes of the Landes department
- Contis
