= Pinasse from the Arcachon basin =

Traditional flat-bottomed boat

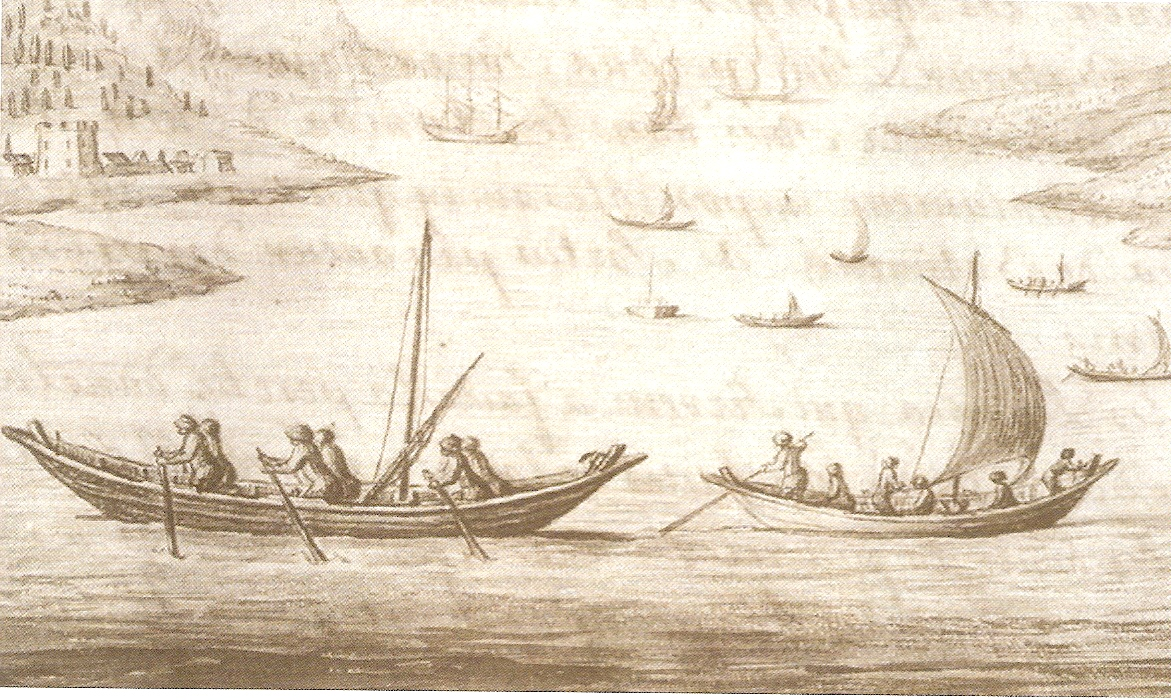
The pinnace as seen by Le Masson du Parc in 1727. Note the clinker planking surrounding the bow and stern.

A pinasse or pinassotte from the Arcachon Basin is a small, flat-bottomed boat traditionally propelled by a spritsail and oars, later by motor. It is primarily used for fishing and oyster farming.

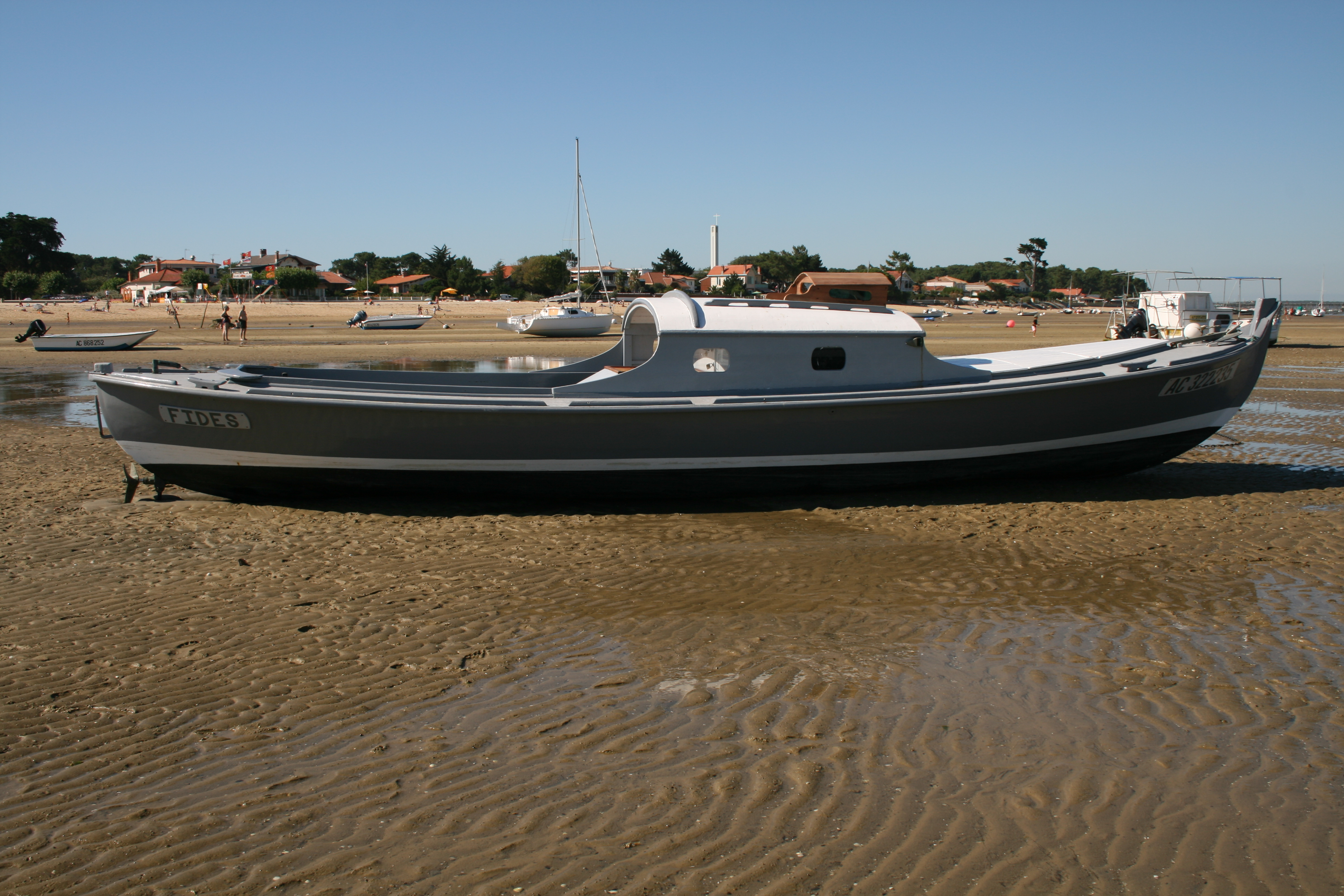
A narrow pinasse from the Arcachon Basin. With the disappearance of sails and the adoption of motors, the vessel bears little resemblance to its form three centuries ago.

== History ==
=== Etymology ===
The origin of the word "pinasse" is debated. It derives from the Gascon Romance term pinaça, with equivalents in Spanish (pinaza), Italian (pinaccia), and English (pinnace). It is generally considered to stem from a Latin derivative *pinacea, meaning "made of pine planks." It should not be confused with the Catalan pinassa, meaning "large pine," which refers to the black pine (Pinus nigra). In Lorraine, "pinasse" is a vernacular term for the Scots pine. The term can also be compared to pinche or pinque (a flat-bottomed boat), derived from the Dutch pinck.

The term thillole or tillole, related to the Galician tilla and Breton tille, likely originates from the Old Norse tilja, meaning "plank."

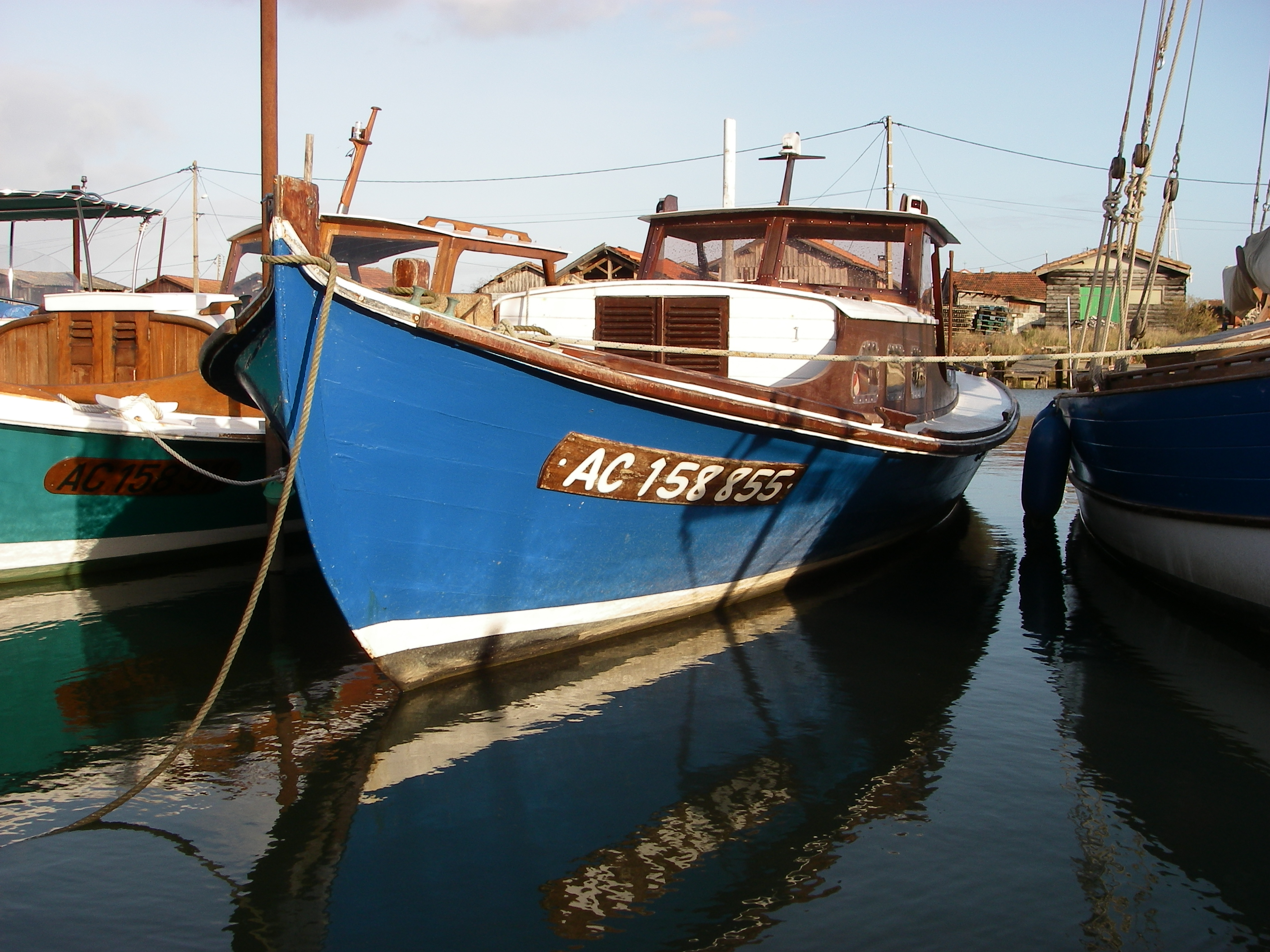
A pinasse at the port of La Teste-de-Buch.

=== Origins ===
The use of pinasses in the Arcachon Basin dates back centuries, though no formal written records mention them before references in 1553 and 1556. These appear in the notarial records of Arnaud de Laville, a notary in La Teste-de-Buch, documenting transactions involving pinasses.

In 1604, a transaction between Jean-Louis d'Épernon, the Captal de Buch, and users of the forêt usagère (communal forest) noted:

… it was agreed that, while at sea, if their oars or masts break, they may take wood without permission to make oars, masts, ganchots, and tostets for pinasses and boats […]. They may sell their pinasses […] without abusing […] or damaging the said wood.

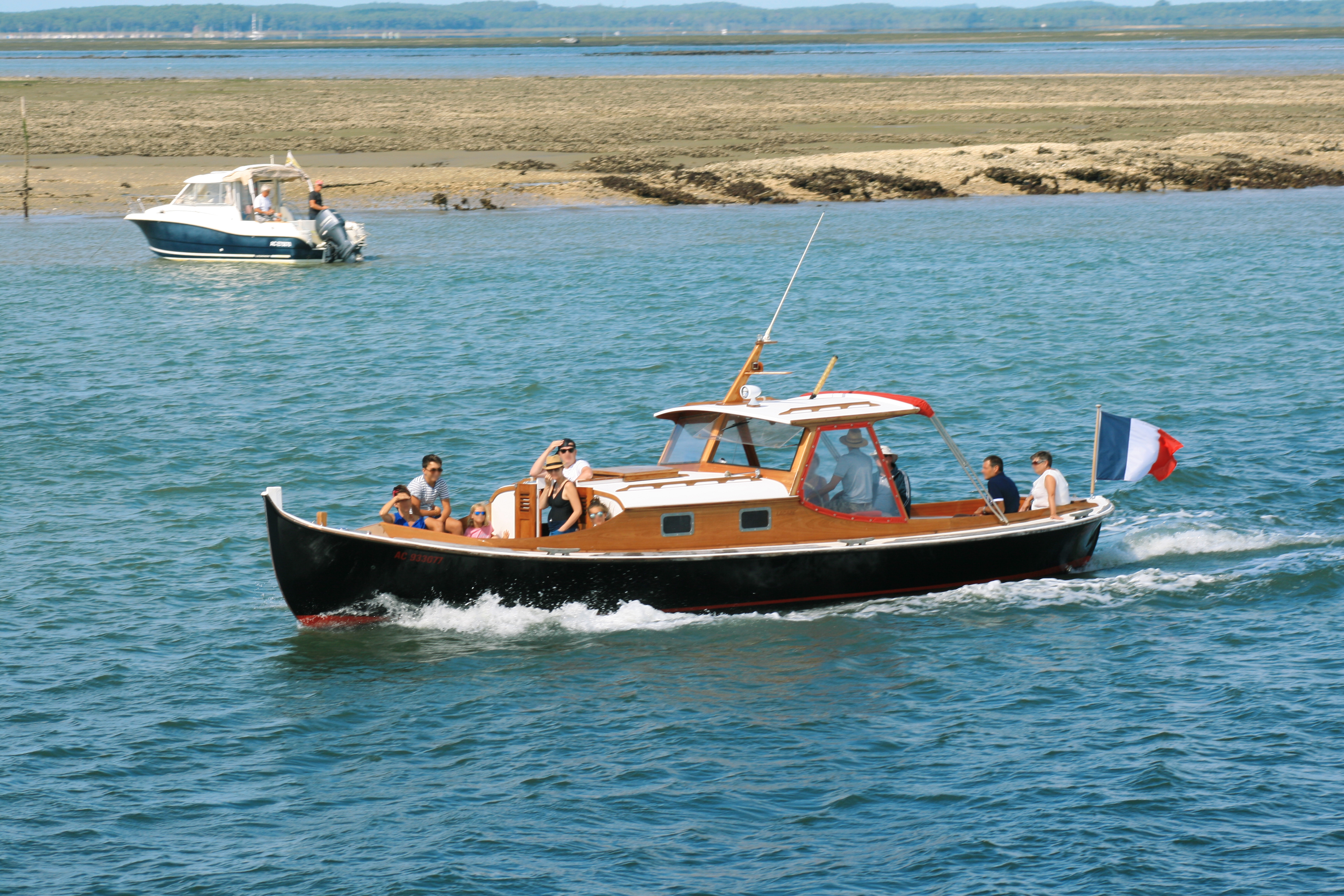
A typical Arcachon Basin pinasse navigating near the Île aux Oiseaux with tourists on board.

In 1708, Claude Masse, in a memoir accompanying his map of the Arcachon Basin, described small boats called pinasses, measuring 15 to 16 feet long and 4 to 5 feet wide.

In 1727, François Le Masson du Parc, a marine commissioner from the Bayonne Admiralty, inspected fisheries along the coast and documented pinasses in the Landes de Gascogne, including at Vielle-Saint-Girons, Mimizan, and the Arcachon Basin. He described them as "shuttle-shaped with slightly raised ends, measuring 20 to 22 feet from stem to sternpost."

Some pinasses had a mast and sail. Le Masson du Parc listed 13 uses for pinasses, including:

- Net fishing in channels (five types);
- Sardine fishing;
- Oyster dredging in channels;
- Seine fishing in the basin and along the coast;
- Palet and palicot fishing;
- Spearfishing;
- Seabird hunting;
- Shrimp fishing;
- Oyster and shellfish gathering;

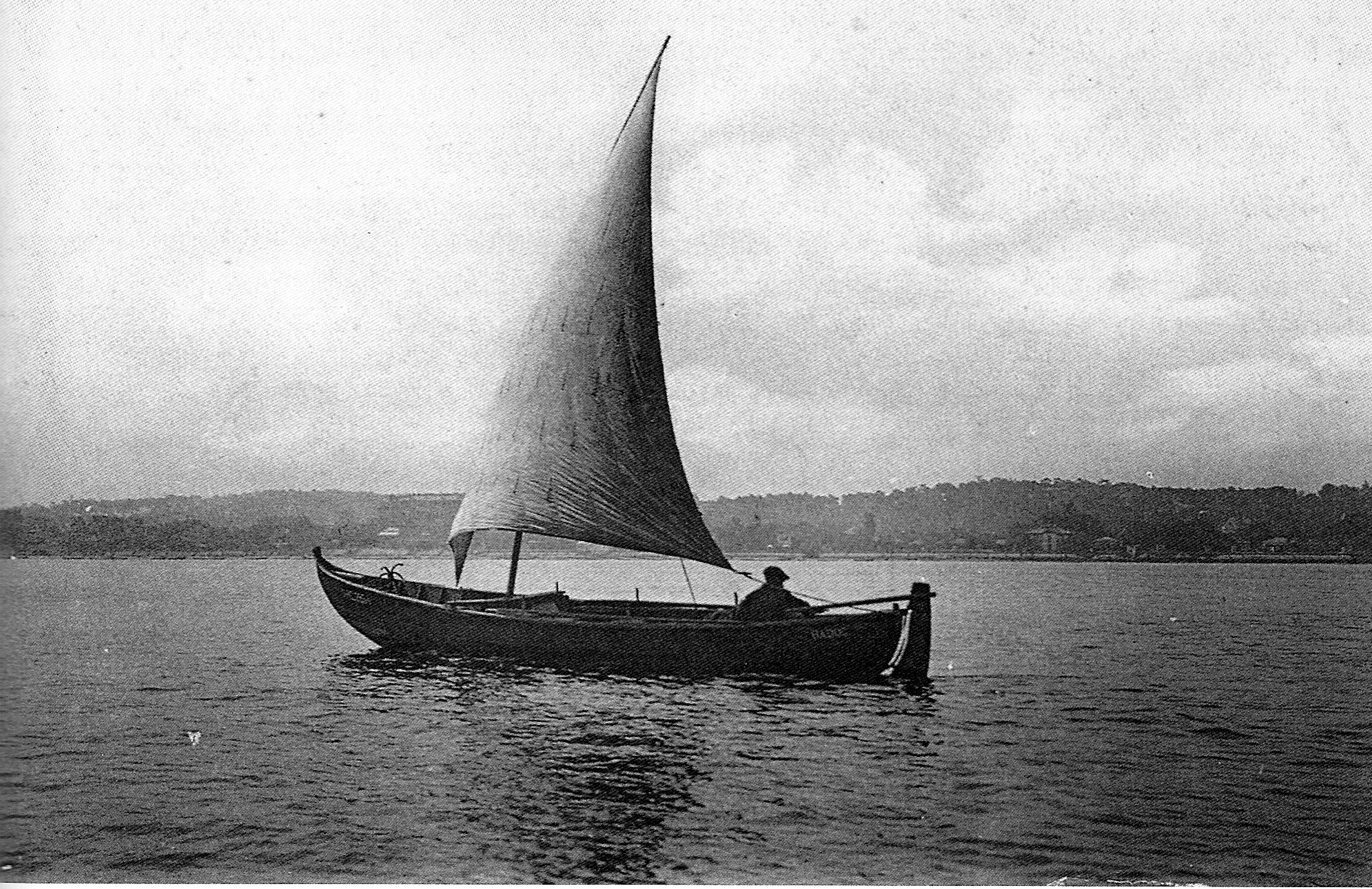
A sail-powered pinasse.

Two types of pinasses were noted: a smaller one, about 6.5 meters long, without a rudder and rowed by two men, and a larger one, at least 7 meters long, with additional planking, a rudder, and operated by six men using oars and sails. A total of 204 pinasses were recorded. Although regulations prohibited pinasses from leaving the Arcachon Basin, larger ones competed with fishing chaloupes at sea. The smaller vessels were later officially termed "pinassottes" in 1909.

Systematic registration of pinasses began in the early 19th century with the establishment of maritime districts. The La Teste-de-Buch maritime district covered the area from Lacanau to Mimizan, though pinassottes, considered auxiliary boats, were not always registered.

=== From sail to steam ===
Detailed descriptions and plans of pinasses emerged in the mid-19th century, with Baudens in 1866 and Georges Sahuqué in 1881, who published an article in Le Yacht. By this time, pinasses had rudders and a mobile, tiltable mast. The clinker-built planking persisted. The arrival of the railway in La Teste in 1841 brought tourists, who began taking paid pinasse excursions, expanding the boat’s use beyond fishing.

In the 1860s, modern oyster farmers adopted pinasses. In 1909, M. Boubès, a former Arcachon maritime administrator, classified pinasses by length, a system still used locally:

1909 Pinasse classification by Boubès
Name	Length
Pinassotte	L < 7.5 metres (25 ft)
Ordinary Pinasse	7.5 metres (25 ft) < L < 8 metres (26 ft)
Bâtarde	8 metres (26 ft) < L < 9 metres (30 ft)
Coastal Pinasse	L > 9 metres (30 ft)

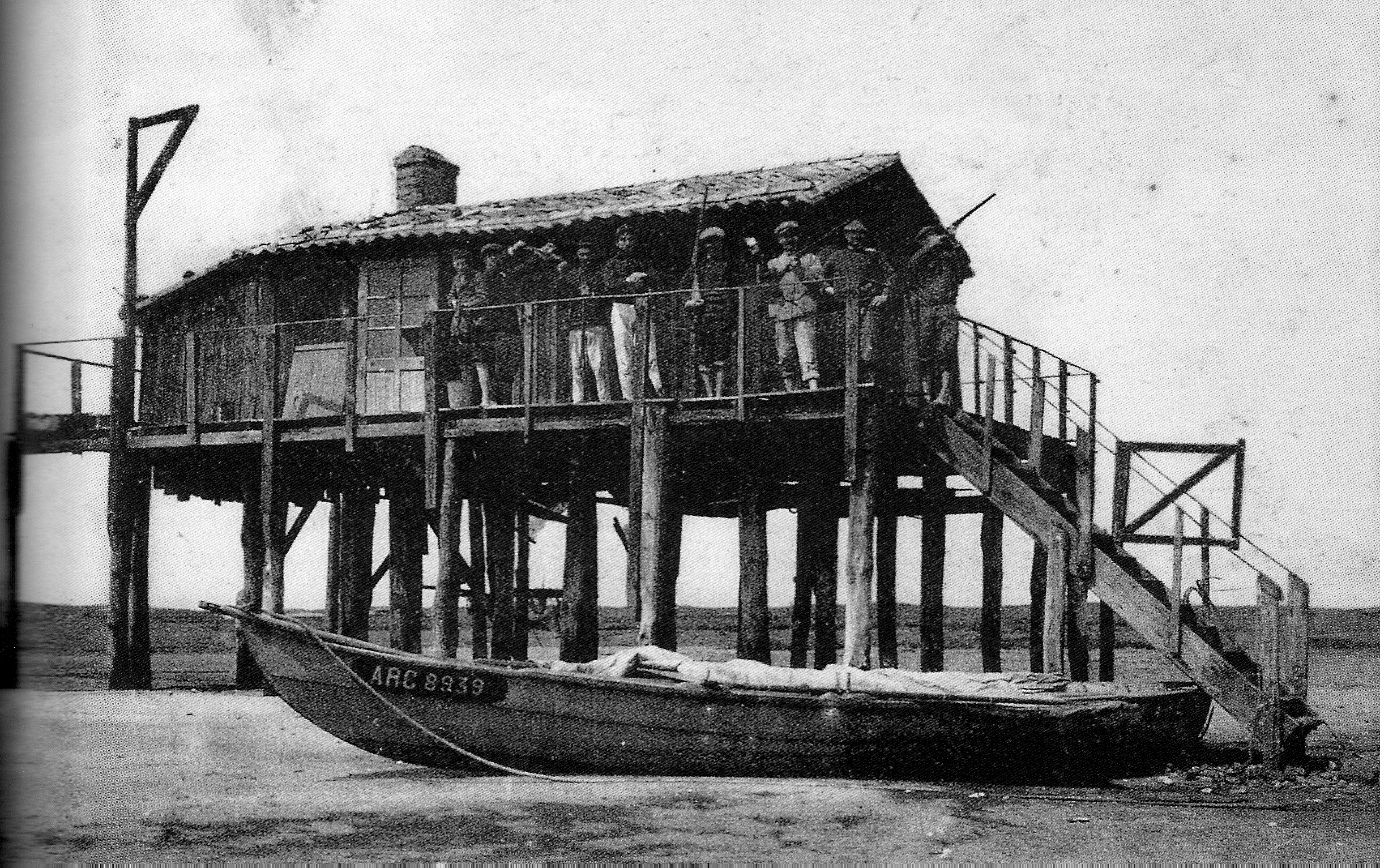
A sail-powered pinasse near a cabane tchanquée.

The early 20th century brought significant changes with motorization. Pinasses evolved from simple, clinker-built, oar- or sail-powered boats without nails, rudders, or keels to motorized vessels with keels, bilge keels, articulated rudders, rabbeted planking, and reinforced stems and sternposts. Motorization became widespread after 1905–1906, initially among wealthier owners, and by 1913, nearly all Arcachon fishing pinasses were motorized.

In 1902, Albert Couach and Auguste Bert developed the first motorized pinasse, Libellule, launched in 1903 and powered by kerosene, earning the nickname "pétroleuse" (kerosene boat). These boats grew larger and sturdier to accommodate heavy internal combustion engines weighing around 250 kilograms (550 lb). Some reached 12 meters, carrying eight to twelve men and three to five dories for sardine fishing, with partial decking.

The success of motorized pinasses was rapid, with 76 built in 1908 alone. Shipyards in Arcachon, La Teste-de-Buch, and Gujan-Mestras thrived, including those of Barrière, Bert, Bonnin Frères, Bossuet, Boyé, Daney, Daycard, Dubourdieu, Fourton, Labouyrie, Mendozat, Monguillet, Mouliets, Pradère, and others. The kerosene-powered, retractable-propeller pinasse became the preferred tool for Arcachon Basin oyster farmers. The French Navy, customs service, and public works department also commissioned pinasses.

In 1926, Bigouden fishermen adopted pinasses, replacing their traditional chaloupes.

=== Pinasses in traditional fishing ===
Until the late 20th century, pinasses remained essential for professional fishermen:

- Sardine pinasses operated from the Basque Country to the Pertuis until the 1930s, when they were replaced by larger motorized boats fishing for tuna and coastal trawling, as sardine fishing alone became unprofitable.
- Seine fishing (traïna), described by Le Masson du Parc in 1727, persisted until the late 1970s. Coastal pinasses used seines up to 280 metres (920 ft) long, set in an arc near the shore and pulled from land to trap fish.
- Garrole or garroulet fishing, a local variant of seine fishing, was practiced in summer at low tide near oyster beds. A 30–40 metres (98–131 ft) net with tighter mesh was towed by a pinassotte and pulled from shore, trapping fish, shrimp, and crabs in seagrass beds. This labor-intensive, non-commercial fishing was recreational but demanding.
- Palet fishing, practiced by "paliqueys," is now rare. Rectangular nets, weighted with lead and buoyed by cork disks, were set on pine stakes along tidal channels to trap fish during tidal shifts. Fishermen collected catches at low tide before seabirds could interfere.
- Pétroleuses towed shell dredges and small trawls until these practices were banned in the late 20th century.
- Jagude fishing with fixed or drifting nets ("tramail") continues, though pinassottes have been replaced by motorized flat-bottomed boats.
- Shrimp fishing, conducted in late autumn and winter, used a broom-like trap made of broom branches with a fish head as bait. The trap was submerged for 24 hours, and shrimp were collected by shaking the trap over a tarp.
- Torchlight fishing (pêche au flambeau or pêche à la hailhe) occurred on dark, windless nights. A fire of pinecones and resinous wood on a stern-mounted grill attracted fish, which were speared with a long pole. Later, acetylene burners and battery-powered lamps replaced fires. This practice is now banned.

=== Pinasses in oyster farming ===
Oyster farmers, or "parqueurs," relied on motorized pinasses until the late 1960s. Oysters were cultivated on the seabed in leased plots enclosed by tar-treated wire fences 30–40 centimetres (12–16 in) high, typically 30–50 metres (98–164 ft) by 10–20 metres (33–66 ft). Plots were separated by channels for access.

Before low tide, pinasses were anchored near the plots. At low tide, farmers worked on foot, sometimes wearing "mastouns" (wooden clogs) to avoid sinking in muddy areas. Oysters were periodically "stirred" with hand-pulled harrows or moved with rakes and forks to prevent burial in sediment. Oysters were sorted in shore-based cabins, with some returned to plots for further growth and others sold.

Heavy equipment, such as fencing, stakes, and oyster spat collection tiles, was transported using tar-coated wooden barges towed alongside pinasses. Young oysters were "sown" into plots using forks. The shift to plastic mesh bags on elevated metal frames reduced the suitability of pinasses, which were gradually replaced by lower, motorized wooden or aluminum boats resembling the old barges.

=== Pinasses for excursions and leisure ===
The 1841 railway brought tourists to the Pays de Buch, sparking a paid excursion industry. Pinasses carried tourists from La Teste-de-Buch to Arcachon, along beaches, and to oyster beds. By the 1950s, modern excursion boats competed with pinasses, many of which are now available for daily or half-day rentals.

In the 1950s and 1960s, some oyster farmers with well-maintained pinasses offered private excursions to affluent clients, including politicians and celebrities, for fishing or discreet beach trips. These services, known as "faire les Messieurs", were conducted discreetly.

By the 20th century, pinasses became pleasure boats, equipped with modern amenities. Modern construction uses composite materials and exotic woods like teak and mahogany, though the distinctive silhouette remains iconic in the Arcachon Basin. Recently, the Raba shipyard in La Teste-de-Buch has revived sail-powered barges for pleasure and historical preservation.

=== Pinasse family tree ===
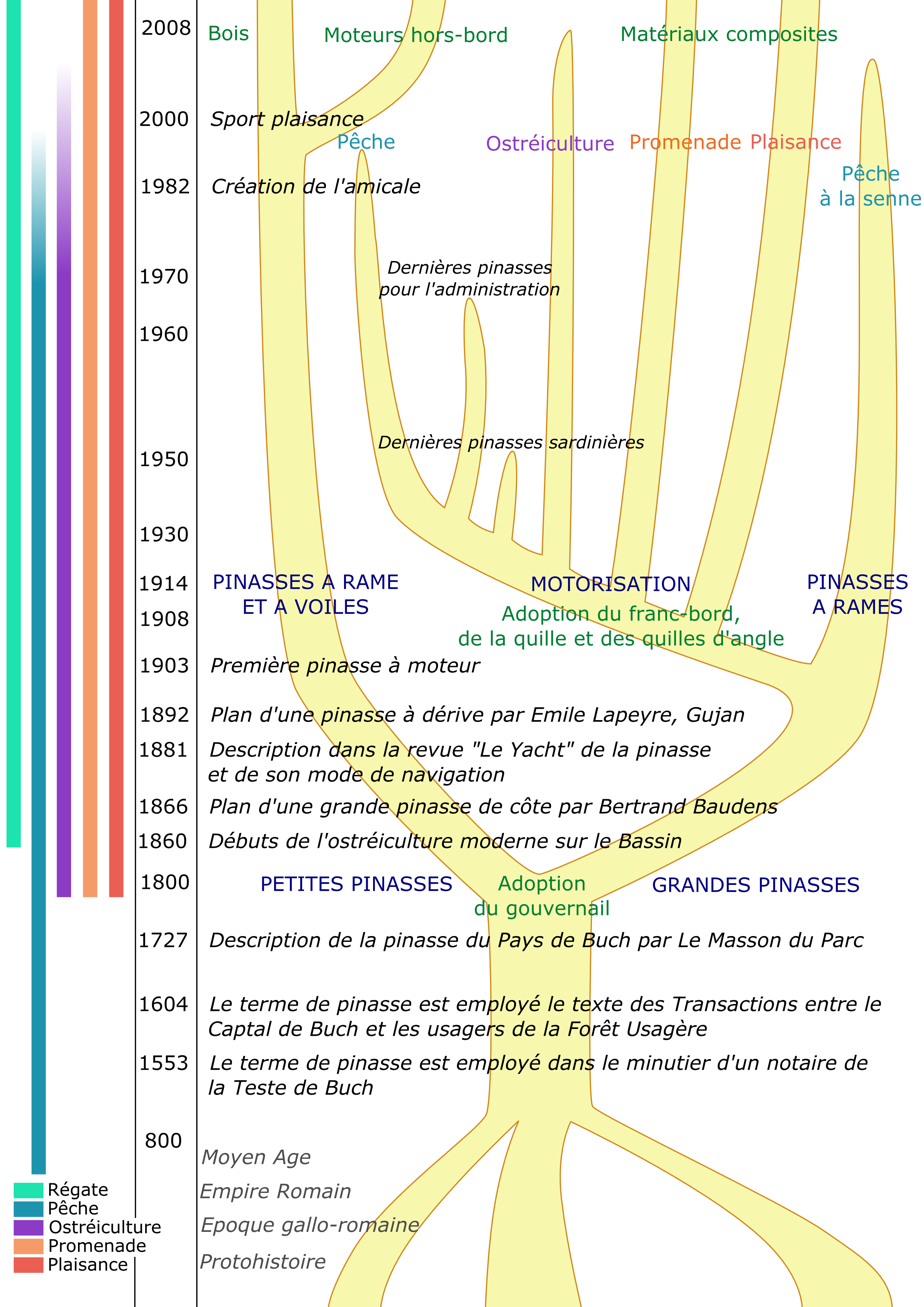
Family tree of the pinasse.

== Sail Pinasse regattas ==
As on other French coasts, fishermen held regattas during local festivals. Sail pinasse regattas among oyster farmers and fishermen continued until 1962, when participation dwindled to five or six boats. In 1982, locals restored abandoned pinasses (e.g., La Belle, Goudurix, L'Afrique, La Clé des cœurs). In 1985, the Raba shipyard built a new pinasse, and the Pinasseyre Association was formed to preserve and build pinasses. In 1986, Arcachon commissioned four new pinasses named after its parishes. The fleet now includes 32 boats, with 22 competing.

Annual summer regattas are held in Arcachon Basin villages. Pinasse sailing is physically demanding, with all maneuvers performed manually without pulleys or tackles. During tacks, the sail is lowered, switched, and raised, with the mast manually tilted into the wind, secured only by the sail’s halyard and its base.

== Gallery ==
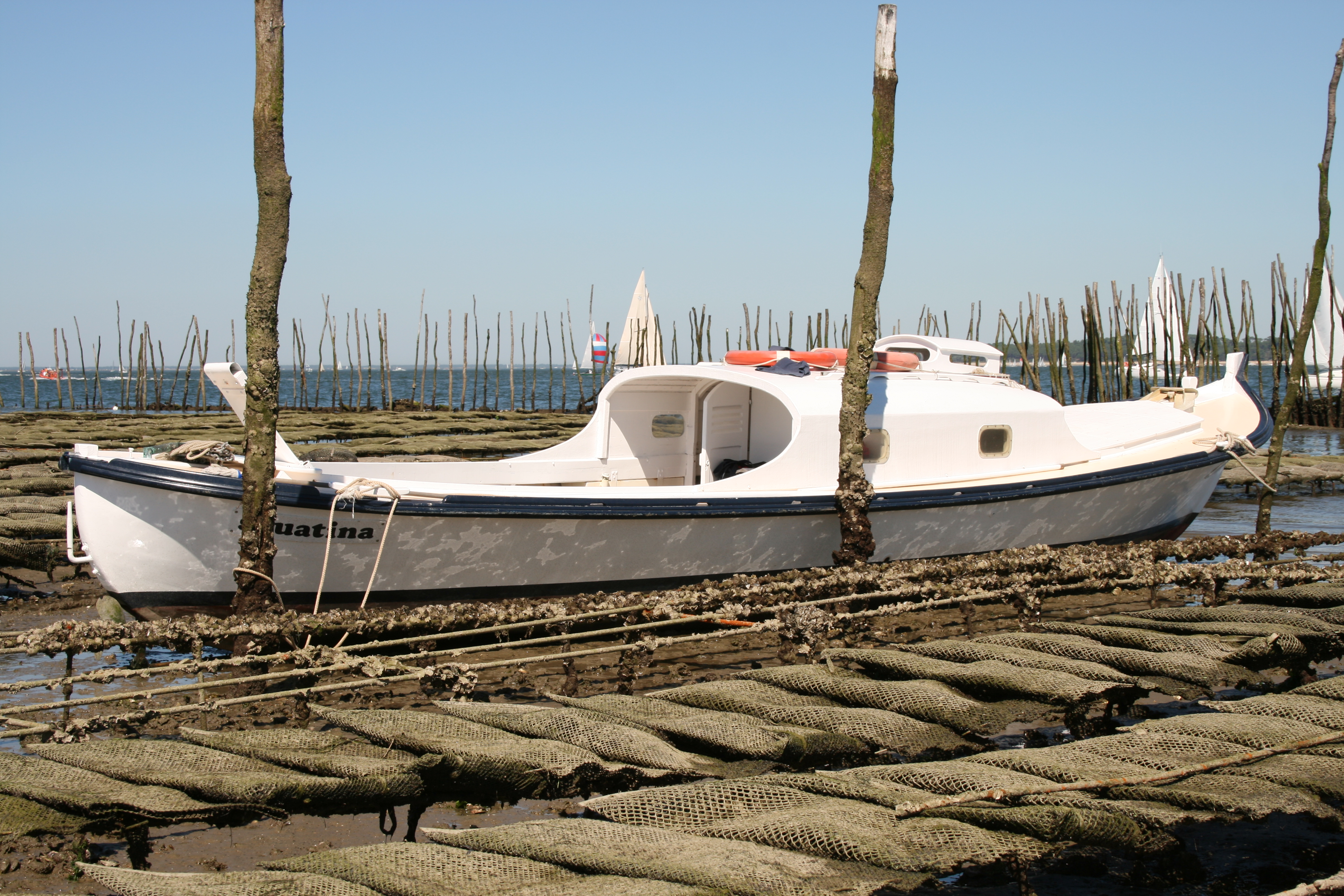
Pinasse at Cap-Ferret.

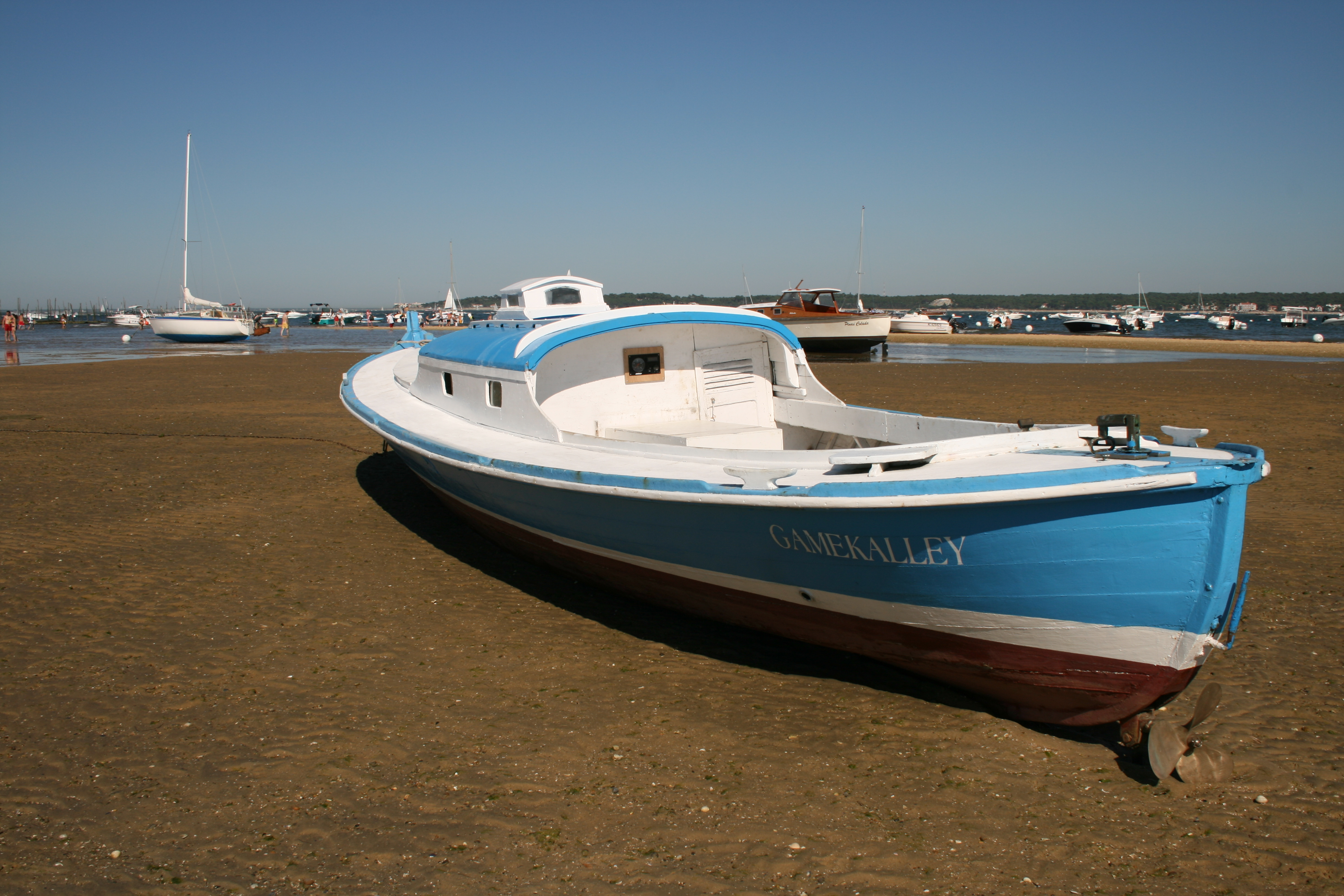
Pinasse at Cap-Ferret.

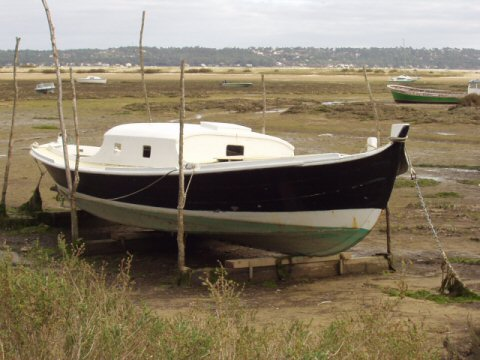
Pinasse at Andernos.

== See also ==
- Arcachon Bay
- Oyster farming
- Fishing vessel
- Clinker boat building
- Seine fishing
- Sailboat

== Bibliography ==
- Cottin, François; Cottin, Françoise (2000). Le Bassin d'Arcachon, au temps des pinasses, de l'huître et de la résine [The Arcachon Basin, in the days of pinasses, oysters, and resin] (in French). Bordeaux: L'Horizon chimérique. p. 363. ISBN 2-907202-64-2.
- Cadoret, Bernard; Abraham, Jean-Pierre (1997). Guide des termes de marine: Petit dictionnaire thématique de marine [Guide to Nautical Terms: Small Thematic Maritime Dictionary] (in French). Le Chasse Marée - Armen. p. 136. ISBN 9782903708726.
