= Thomas Illyricus =

Dalmatian Franciscan priest (1484–1528)

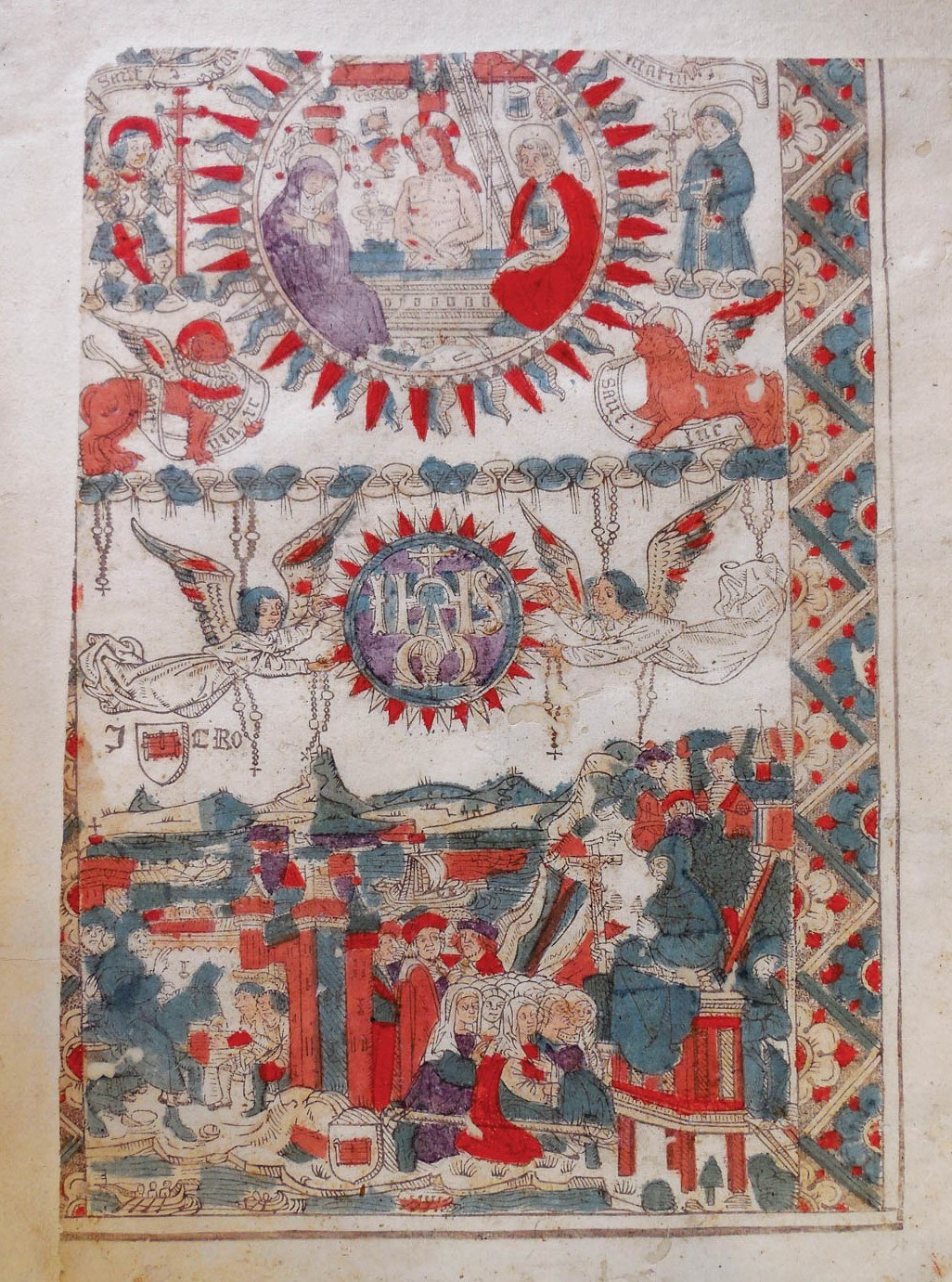
Preaching of Thomas in Toulouse, depicted in a woodcut printed there in 1519

Thomas Illyricus (1484/5–1528/9) was a Dalmatian Franciscan theologian, hermit, pilgrim and itinerant preacher who spent most of his life in southern France. He is known for the purported discovery of the venerated image of Our Lady of Arcachon. He gained a substantial following for his prophetic preaching and advocacy of church reform. He later wrote two early critiques of Martin Luther.

== Life ==
Thomas was born in 1484 or 1485 in the town of Vrana in Dalmatia. The nickname Illyricus implies that he was a Slav. While still a child, he moved with his family to Osimo in the March of Ancona in Italy. He spent his early life in the fields, herding goats. Nothing is known of his education, although he was fluent in Latin and claimed to have been a professor of theology. He eventually joined the Observant Franciscans in the province of Ancona. In 1510, at the age of twenty-five, he became a priest and an itinerant preacher. He initially preached in the villages of Ancona and later in other cities in Italy, such as Genoa, Parma, Rimini and Pesaro.

In 1515, Thomas preached in the Republic of Ragusa. The Ragusan authorities financed his pilgrimage to the Holy Land, from which he returned in May 1516. In 1518, he went as a pilgrim to the Magdalene's basilica in Saint-Maximin and undertook his first pilgrimage on the way of Saint James to Spain. He then went on a preaching tour of southern France, visiting the cities of Aix, Grenoble, Toulouse, Nérac, Montauban, Cahors, Villefranche, Condom and Foix. He also visited Geneva in the Holy Roman Empire. In 1520, he attended the Franciscan general chapter in Bordeaux. He made a second trip to the shrine of Saint James and upon his return founded a hermitage at La Teste-de-Buch near Arcachon. He allegedly discovered the damaged statue of Our Lady of Arcachon washed ashore and built a wooden chapel for it. From 1520 to 1525, he preached throughout southern France. He especially frequented the cities of Bordeaux, Toulouse and Lyon. He became renowned for his asceticism and uprightness.

In 1525, Thomas retired to the friary of Sainte-Marie de Carnolès near Menton in the Principality of Monaco, where he became close to the ruling Grimaldi family. In 1527, Pope Clement VII named him grand inquisitor in the Duchy of Savoy to root out Lutheranism and Waldensianism. He continued to occasionally preach in cities like Nice. He died in Menton in 1528 or 1529 on the road from the oratory to the cloisters. Miracles were reported at the spot where he died.

== Works ==
Thomas preaching to a crowd, from the titlepage of his published sermons

Thomas's works are mostly in Latin, though he also published a collection of French prayers and songs, Devotes oraisons en françois avec une chanson d'amour divin, in Paris in 1528.

=== Sermons ===
Sermones de Christo et Christipara, also called Sermones aurei, is a collection of Thomas's sermons published in two volumes at Toulouse in 1521. It contains 25 sermons on Jesus and 25 on Mary, preached in Toulouse and transcribed by Masseo Bruna di Frossasco.

Thomas was also famed for his prophecies. In 1521, he preached in Toulouse a coming disaster for the church. In 1526, he preached in Bordeaux in Gascon, his words later being seen as predicting the Wars of Religion. A set of eleven pamphlets claiming to be his prophecies was published at Paris in 1520 and again in 1530 under the title Copie de la prophetie faicte par le pauvre frere Thomas souverain exclamateur de la parolle de Dieu nouvellement translatée de ytalien en francoys. In 1524, Thomas preached a sermon against Martin Luther, which was translated into French by Nicolas Volcyr de Serrouville and published at Paris the following year as Sermon de charité avec les probations des erreurs de Luther. He saw Luther as sent by God as punishment for men's sins, but prophesied that a "sword of fury" was still to come.

Thomas's powerful and distinctly apocalyptic preaching has sometimes been seen less as a prophetic revelation of a coming cataclysm than one of its primary causes. Denis Crouzet "traces the roots of the violence" of the Wars of Religion "to the eschatological preaching of ... Thomas Illyricus." According to Luc Rucaut, Crouzet "seems to ascribe much potency to the preaching of a man whose influence he argues could be felt more than two generations after his death." For Crouzet, the "first contours" of the story culminating in the Saint Bartholomew's Day massacre can be seen in the arrival in Condom of Thomas Illyricus on a donkey on 27 October 1518.

=== Treatises against Luther ===
Thomas's most famous works are his two treatises against Luther. The earlier and shorter is titled Libellus de potestate summi pontificis but is better known as Clipeus status papalis. It was written in response to Luther's To the Christian Nobility of the German Nation (1520), but, owing to difficulty finding funding, was not published until 1523 at Turin. It contains a quadruple dedication to Pope Adrian VI, Duke Charles III of Savoy, Cardinal John of Lorraine and the people of Lyon. Thomas argued for papal authority but denied papal infallibility, giving precedence to ecumenical councils. He called for a new council and condemned the abusive sale of indulgences, but defended the doctrine of penance.

Thomas's longer treatise against Luther, In Lutherianas hereses, was published in 1524 in response to Luther's On the Babylonian Captivity of the Church and On the Freedom of a Christian. It is dedicated to Pope Clement VII and Augustine Grimaldi. His approach was analytical and his arguments based on the Bible and the Church Fathers, which Luther respected, rather than papal decretals and scholastic theology, which he despised. He rejected Luther's doctrine of justification by faith alone and defended the value of celibacy.

=== Letters ===
Several of Thomas's letters have survived. A collection of four letters (Litterae or Epistolae) was published at Toulouse in 1519. The letters, all from that year, were addressed to the senate of Toulouse on the Holy Name of Jesus; to the students of the University of Toulouse; to the faithful generally, on marriage; and to the king's army, on salvation. The letter on marriage was translated into French as S'ensuyt l'epistre de fr. Thomas Illyric à tous les chrétiens sur le mariage and published at Poitiers in 1525. A letter to all Christians on church reform, Epistola fratris Thome Illyrici ordinis Minorum divini verbi predicatoris generalis directa ad omnes Christi fideles contra hypocritas, quorum bellum est intestinum contra Ecclesiam dei, was published at Limoges in 1520. A letter to Ragusa, De invicem habenda caritate, is preserved in manuscript.

== Bibliography ==
=== Editions ===
- Thomas Illyricus (n.d.). Copie de la prophetie faicte par le pauvre frere Thomas souverain exclamateur de la parolle de Dieu nouvellement translatée de ytalien en francoys (in French).
- Thomas Illyricus (1523). Libellus de potestate summi pontificis... qui intitulatur Clipeus status papalis (in Latin).
- Thomas Illyricus (1524). In Lutherianas hereses clipeus catholicae ecclesiae (in Latin).

=== Works cited ===
- Brown, Karin Brinkmann (2005) [1996]. "Thomas Illyricus". In Hans J. Hillebrand (ed.). The Oxford Encyclopedia of the Reformation. Oxford University Press. ISBN 978-0-19-506493-3.
- Bryson, David (1999). Queen Jeanne and the Promised Land: Dynasty, Homeland, Religion and Violence in Sixteenth-Century France. Brill. ISBN 978-9004113787.
- Carroll, Stuart (2019). "Political Justice and the Outbreak of the Wars of Religion". French History. 33 (2): 177–198. doi:10.1093/fh/crz009.
- Crouzet, Denis (1994). La nuit de la Saint-Barthélemy: un rêve perdu de la Renaissance. Paris: Fayard. ISBN 978-2818502457.
- Crouzet, Denis (2001). "Circa 1533: Anxieties, Desires, and Dreams". Journal of Early Modern History. 5 (1). Translated by Jonathan Good: 24–61. doi:10.1163/157006501X00023.
- Fine, John Van Antwerp (2005). When Ethnicity Did Not Matter in the Balkans: A Study of Identity in Pre-Nationalist Croatia, Dalmatia, and Slavonia in the Medieval and Early-Modern Periods. University of Michigan Press.
- Gortan, Veljko; Vratović, Vladimir (1971). "The Basic Characteristics of Croatian Latinity". Humanistica Lovaniensia. 20: 37–68. JSTOR 23973487.
- Péligry, Christian (2014). "Saint François de Paule ou Thomas Illyricus ?". Nouvelles de l'Estampe (248): 4–17. doi:10.4000/estampe.699.
- Rucaut, Luc (1999). Hatred in Print: Aspects of Anti-Protestant Polemic in the French Wars of Religion (PhD dissertation). University of St Andrews.
- Rudge, F. M. (1913). "Our Lady of Arcachon" . In Herbermann, Charles (ed.). Catholic Encyclopedia. New York: Robert Appleton Company.
- Taylor, Larissa (1992). Soldiers of Christ: Preaching in Late Medieval and Reformation France. Oxford University Press.
- Van der Heijden, Maarten; Roest, Bert (2022). "Franciscans Authors, 13th–18th Century: A Catalogue in Progress". Radboud University Nijmegen.
- Zawart, Anscar (1928). The History of Franciscan Preaching and of Franciscan Preachers (1209–1927): A Bio-bibliographical Study. J. F. Wagner.
