= Arcachon villa =

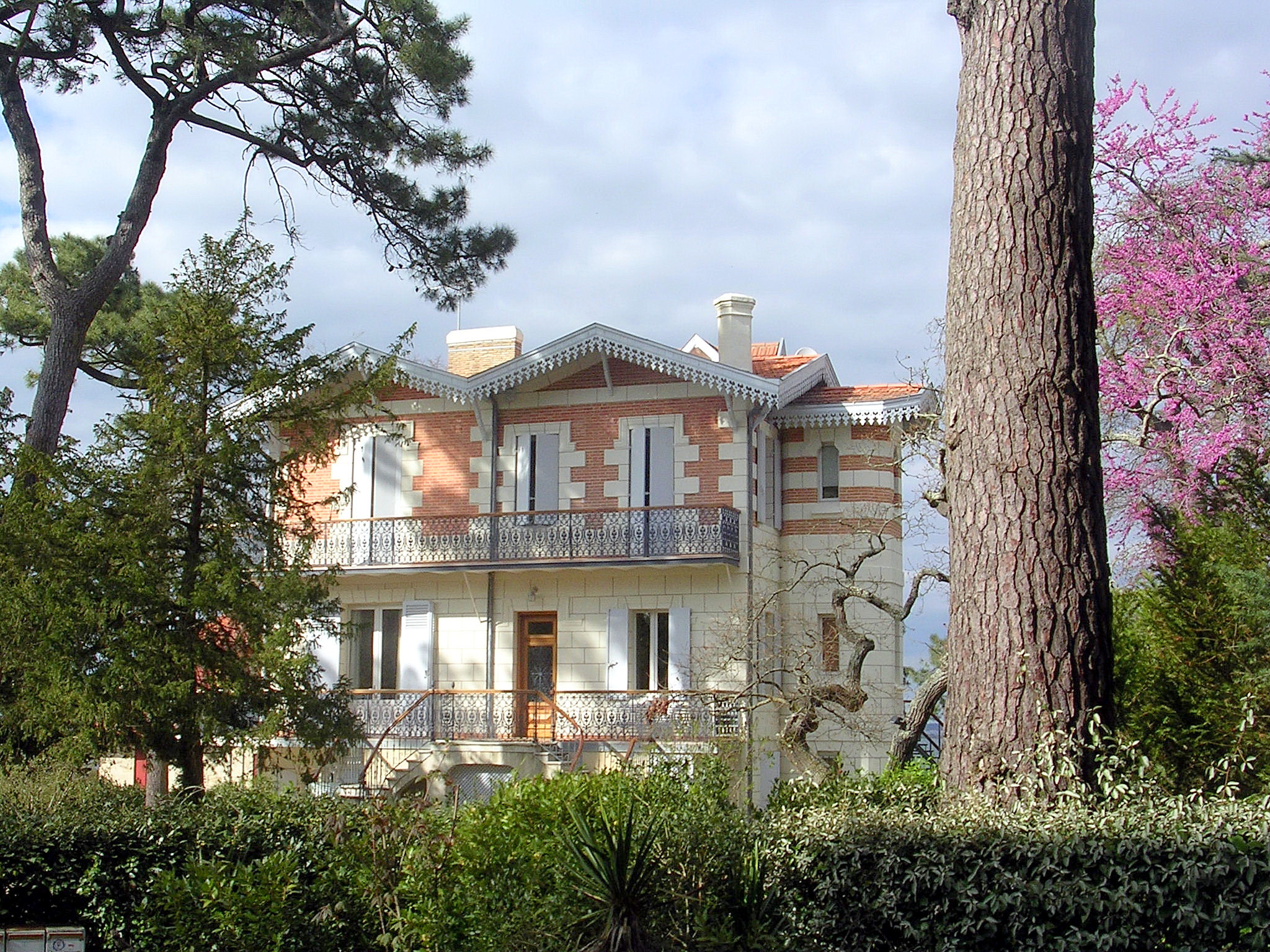
An Arcachon villa or Arcachonnaise

Arcachon is known for the Arcachonnaise, the local name for an Arcachon villa, which is the architectural style of many of the older houses built in France. It is a type of Victorian architecture.

== See also ==
- Arcachon Bay
- Communes of the Gironde department
