= Our Lady of Arcachon =

Venerated image of the Blessed Virgin Mary enshrined at the basilica of Arcachon, France

Coordinates: 44.6613°N 1.1814°W

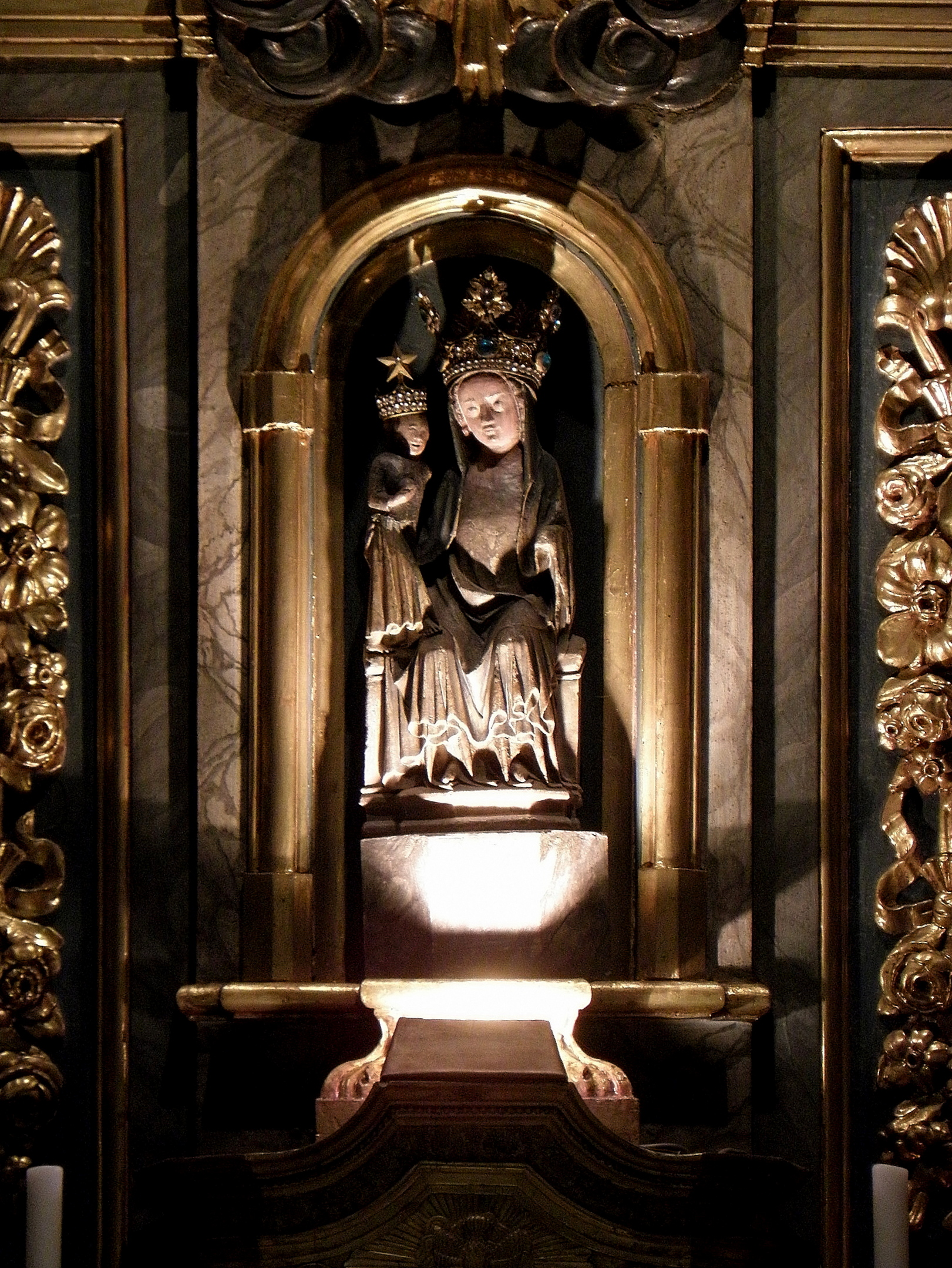
The famed Marian image enshrined within the basilica of the same title. From the canonical coronation of 1873.

Our Lady of Arcachon, the Star of the Sea, is a venerated image of the Blessed Virgin Mary enshrined at the basilica of Arcachon, France. Originally from the 13th century, it was carved from a block of alabaster about 50cm (20 inches) in height representing the Madonna and Child.

The famed Marian image was granted a pontifical decree on 15 July 1870 by Pope Pius IX, and was canonically crowned on 16 July 1873 by Cardinal Ferdinand August Donnet. Its golden crown was donated by fishermen and sailors, to whom its original Marian cult and devotion was historically associated with.

== History ==
According to pious legend, Thomas Illyricus of Osimo (born about the middle of the fifteenth century), a Franciscan friar who had retired to the forest solitude of Arcachon, is said to have found this statue, much battered by the waves, on the seashore. He immediately constructed a wooden chapel which was replaced, a century later, by a spacious stone sanctuary. This, in turn, was so menaced by the drifting sands of the dunes as to necessitate the erection in 1723 of a new church on a neighbouring hill overlooking the Bay of Arcachon. The statue survived both revolutions and was ultimately granted the honour of a canonical coronation for France via an apostolic brief granted by Pope Pius IX on 15 July 1870.

Devotion to Our Lady of Arcachon spread far and wide, and the shrine became a centre of pilgrimage. Before 1842, the church had been surrounded only by a few fishermen's huts, but with the erection of villas and the discovery of the salubrious climate of the area people began to flock to the spot, which is now the centre of a flourishing town.

Pontifical coronation by Cardinal Ferdinand Donnet (1873)
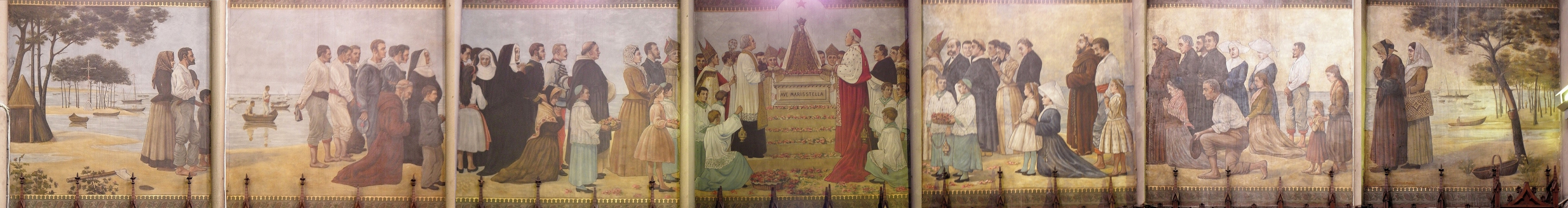
