= Côte des Landes =

Section of the Atlantic Ocean coast in France

Coordinates: 44°12′N 1°18′W

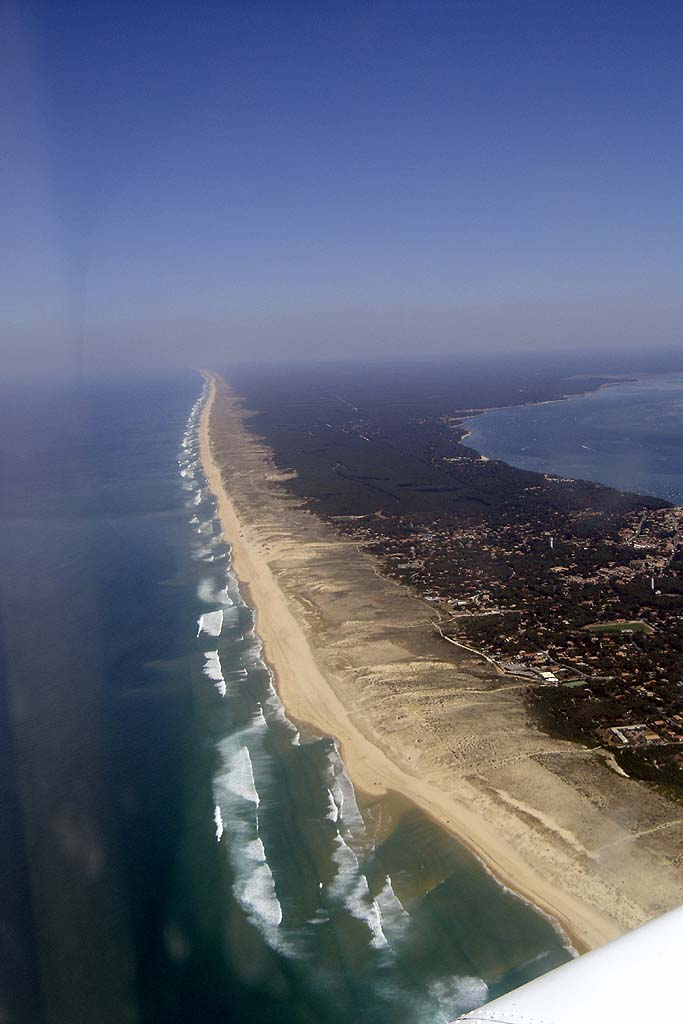
Côtes des Landes

Côte des Landes or Côte landaise is a touristic name given to a section of the French seashore. It is a section of Côte d'Argent.

All along the French coast, the different parts of the seashore have specific names.

In the southwest of France along the Atlantic Ocean, "la Côte des Landes" begins in the north at Arcachon Bay and continues south to the mouth of the river Adour. The area is famous for surfing and beach activities.
