= Nicolas Volcyr de Serrouville =

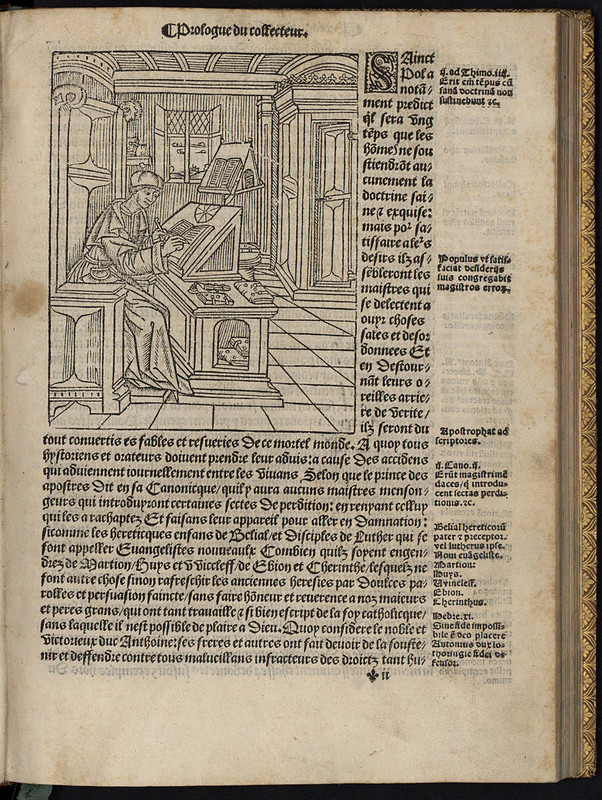
Woodcut of Volcyr at his desk, by Gabriel Salmon

Nicolas Volcyr de Serrouville (c. 1480–1541), known in German as Nicolaus Wollick, was a translator, music theorist and historian, one of the most prominent figures of the Renaissance in the Duchy of Lorraine.

== Life ==
Nicolas Volcyr was born in Serrouville in the Duchy of Bar around 1480. His family name was Wolquier, but his published works in French bear the name Volcyr, while his musical work published in Germany bears the name Wollick.

Volcyr began studies at the University of Cologne in 1498. He learnt music under Melchior Schanppecher. He received a master of arts degree in 1501 and a doctorate in theology in 1507. He later also received a maîtrise ès arts from the University of Paris. This type of double degree, one in the Holy Roman Empire and one in France, was common in Lorraine at the time.

In 1507, Volcyr was appointed master of the choirboys of Metz Cathedral. In 1508, he began lecturing at Paris. He arrived at the court of Lorraine by 1513. He was listed as one of the duke's secretaries on 1 January 1514. On 8 May 1520, through the intercession of Théodore Mitte, he was ennobled by Duke Antoine and took the surname "de Serrouville". The duke appointed him court historian (indiciaire). The historian William Monter calls him Antoine's "de facto propaganda minister".

In 1540, Volcyr married Jeanne Chastellain. He drew up his will on 23 May 1541 and died later that year at Nancy.

== Works ==
Volcyr's earliest known work is his Gregoriana, a Latin treatise on Gregorian chant published at Cologne in 1501 as part of the Opus aureum of Heinrich Quentell. This went through many editions in Germany and France before 1530. A revised edition under the title Enchiridion musices was published at Paris in 1509 by Jean Petit and François Regnault. There is a modern edition edited by Klaus Wolfgang Niemöller under the title Musica Gregoriana. Among his sources were Adam of Fulda, Hugo Spechtshart von Reutlingen, Michael Keinspeck and Johannes Cochlaeus. The French edition was praised by Franchinus Gaffurius.

Volcyr's historical works include:

- L'histoire et recueil de la triomphante et glorieuse victoire obtenue contre les séduits et abusés luthériens (Paris: Galliot du Pré, 1527), an account of the German Peasants' War and his most famous work
- Traicté nouveau de la desecr actuelle de Jehan Castellan, fanatique (Metz, 1525)
- Chronicque abregee par petits vers huytains des Empereurs, Roys et Ducz Daustrasie (Paris: Didier Maheu, 1531)

Volcyr may have been most at home as a translator of Latin works into French. Some of his translations include:

- Cité du cueur divin, a translation of the sermon Civitas cordis divini, delivered by Jean Glapion before the court of Lorraine in 1521. It is unpublished and preserved in a manuscript alongside a transcription of the original sermon.
- Sermon de charité, a translation of a sermon by Thomas Illyricus (Saint-Nicolas-de-Port: Jérôme Jacob, 1525)
- Flave Vegece René, homme noble et illustre, du Fait de guerre et fleur de chevalerie; Sexte Jule Frontin, des Stratagemes; Aelian, de l'Ordre et instruction des batailles; Modeste, des Vocables du fait de guerre, pareillement CXX histoires concernant le fait des guerres, a translation of the four military treatises (Vegetius' De re militari, Frontinus' Stratagemata, Aelian's Tactica and Pseudo-Modestus' De vocabulis rei militaris), dedicated to the Dauphin Francis III, Duke of Brittany (Paris: Chrétien Wechel, 1535)
- Physionomie, a translation of the Liber physiognomiae of Michael Scot (Paris: Denis Janot, 1540)
- Des gestes des Turcz, a translation of Francesco Negri's translation of the Italian Commentario delle cose dei Turchi of Paolo Giovio (Paris: Chrétien Wechel, 1540)

== Bibliography ==
- Cullière, Alain (2009). "L'«Hérésie» de Nicolas Volcyr (1534)". Bibliothèque d'Humanisme et Renaissance. 71 (3): 433–455. JSTOR 41239510.
- Fery-Hue, Françoise (2015). "Un séjour de Nicolas Volcyr au Château de Comines:Trois œuvres inédites dédiées à Georges d'Halluin". Bibliothèque d'Humanisme et Renaissance. 77 (3): 635–646. JSTOR 44511048.
- Marot, Pierre (1931). "Notes sur Nicolas Volcyr de Serrouville". Revue historique de la Lorraine. 75: 5–13.
- Monter, E. William (2007). A Bewitched Duchy: Lorraine and Its Dukes, 1477–1736. Librairie Droz. ISBN 978-2-600-01165-5.
- Niemöller, Klaus Wolfgang (2001). "Wollick [Wolquier, Volcyr], Nicolaus [Nicolas]". Grove Music Online (on-line ed.). Oxford University Press. doi:10.1093/gmo/9781561592630.article.30521. ISBN 978-1-56159-263-0. (subscription, Wikilibrary access, or UK public library membership required)
