= Arcachon station =

Railway station in France

Arcachon
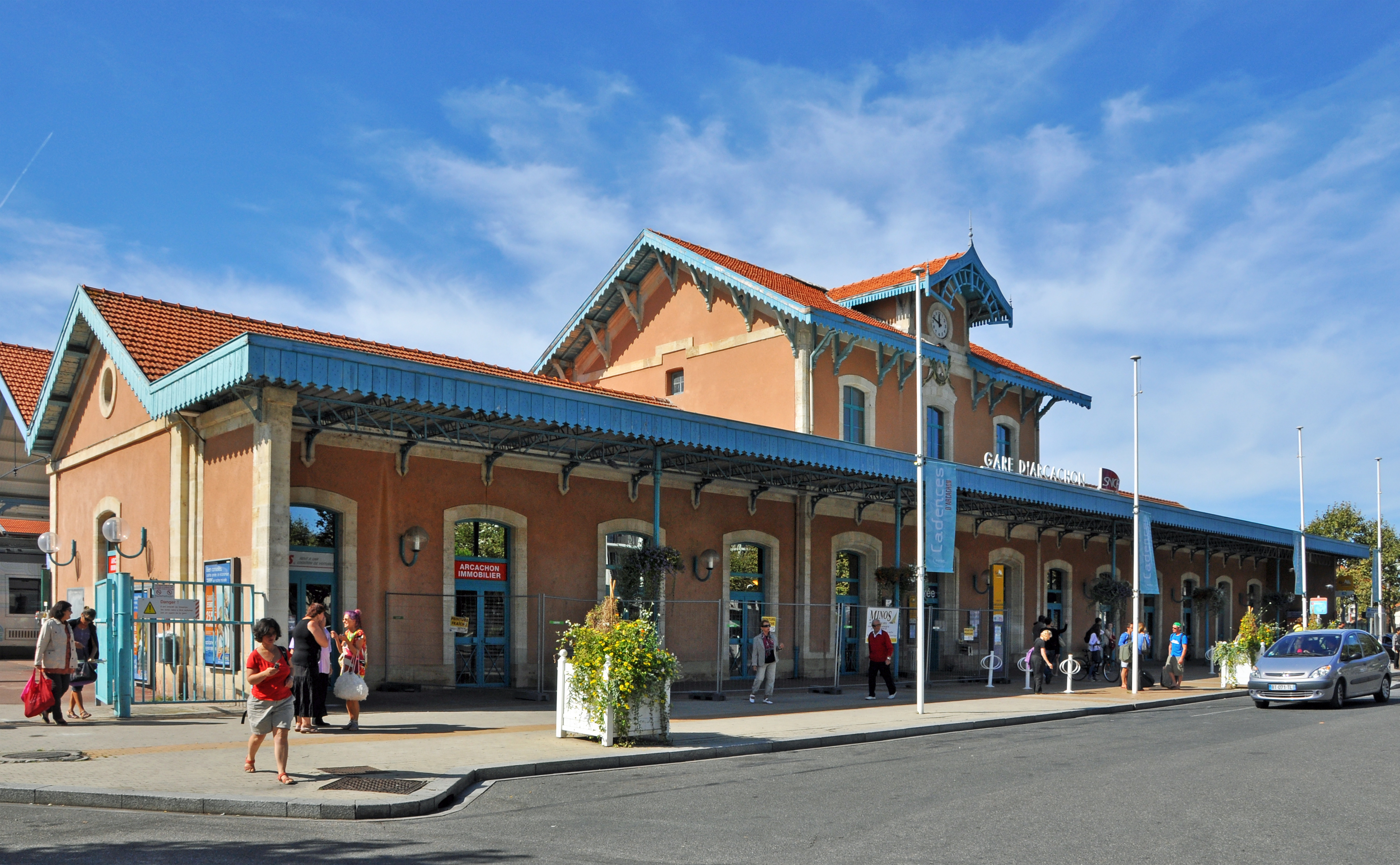
- Arcachon railway station

General information
- Location: Arcachon, Gironde, Nouvelle-Aquitaine, France
- Coordinates: 44°39′31″N 1°09′53″E
- Line: Lamothe–Arcachon railway
- Platforms: 2
- Tracks: 3

Other information
- Station code: 87582668

History
- Opened: 25 July 1857

Passengers
- 2024: 1,295,083

Services
Preceding station	SNCF	Following station
La Teste towards Montparnasse	TGV inOui	Terminus
Preceding station	TER Nouvelle-Aquitaine	Following station
La Teste towards Bordeaux	41.2U	Terminus
Location

Arcachon station (French: Gare d'Arcachon) is a railway station in Arcachon, Gironde, Southwestern France. Opened in 1857, it is the western terminus of the Lamothe–Arcachon railway. The train services are operated by the SNCF.

== Train services ==
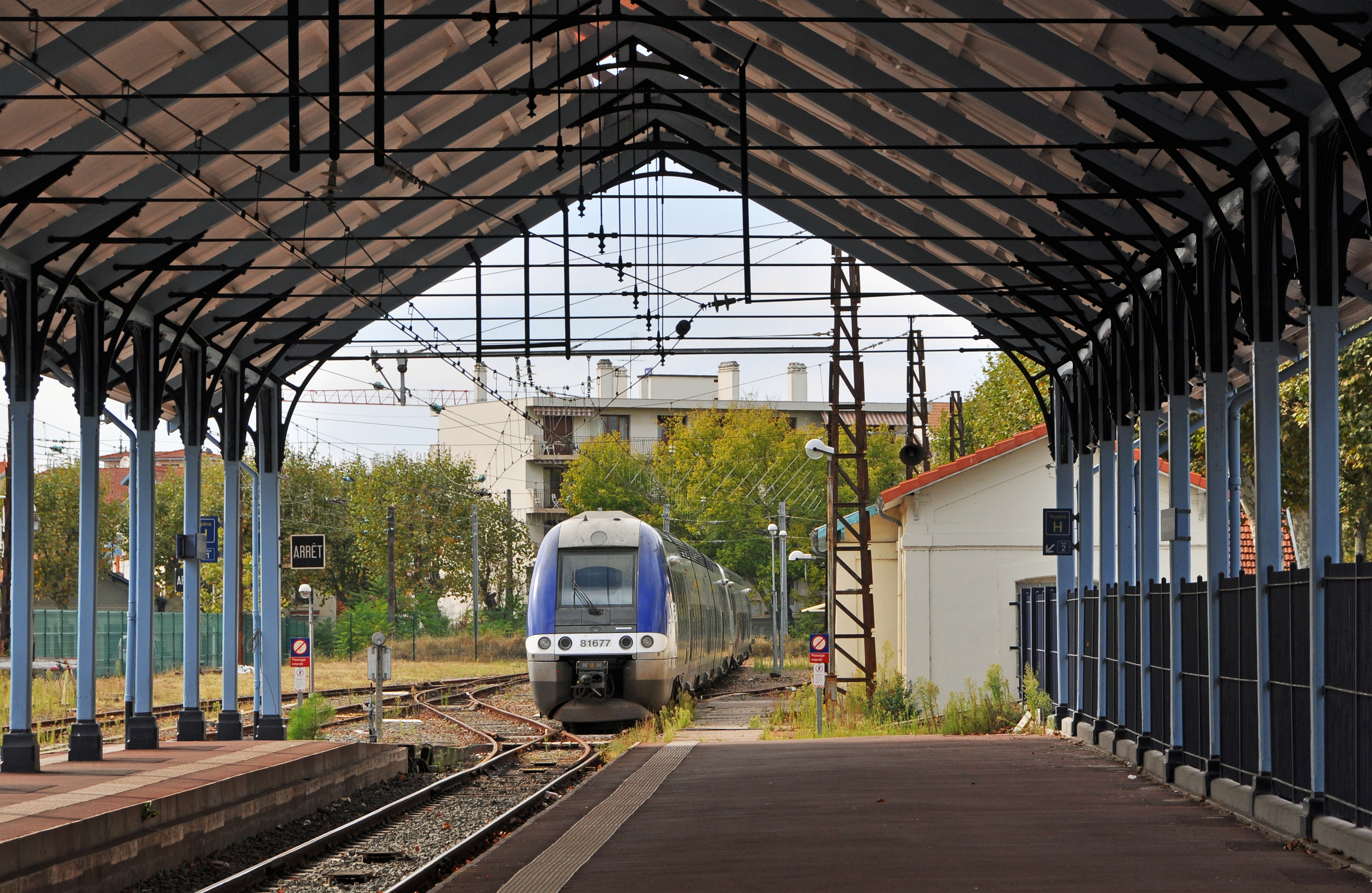
A TER train in the sidings at the station

- High-speed services (TGV) Paris - Bordeaux - Arcachon
- Local services (TER Nouvelle-Aquitaine) Arcachon - Facture-Biganos - Bordeaux
