= Arcachon Bay =

Delta and basin in France

- Bassin d'Arcachon (French); Laca d'Arcaishon (Gascon)
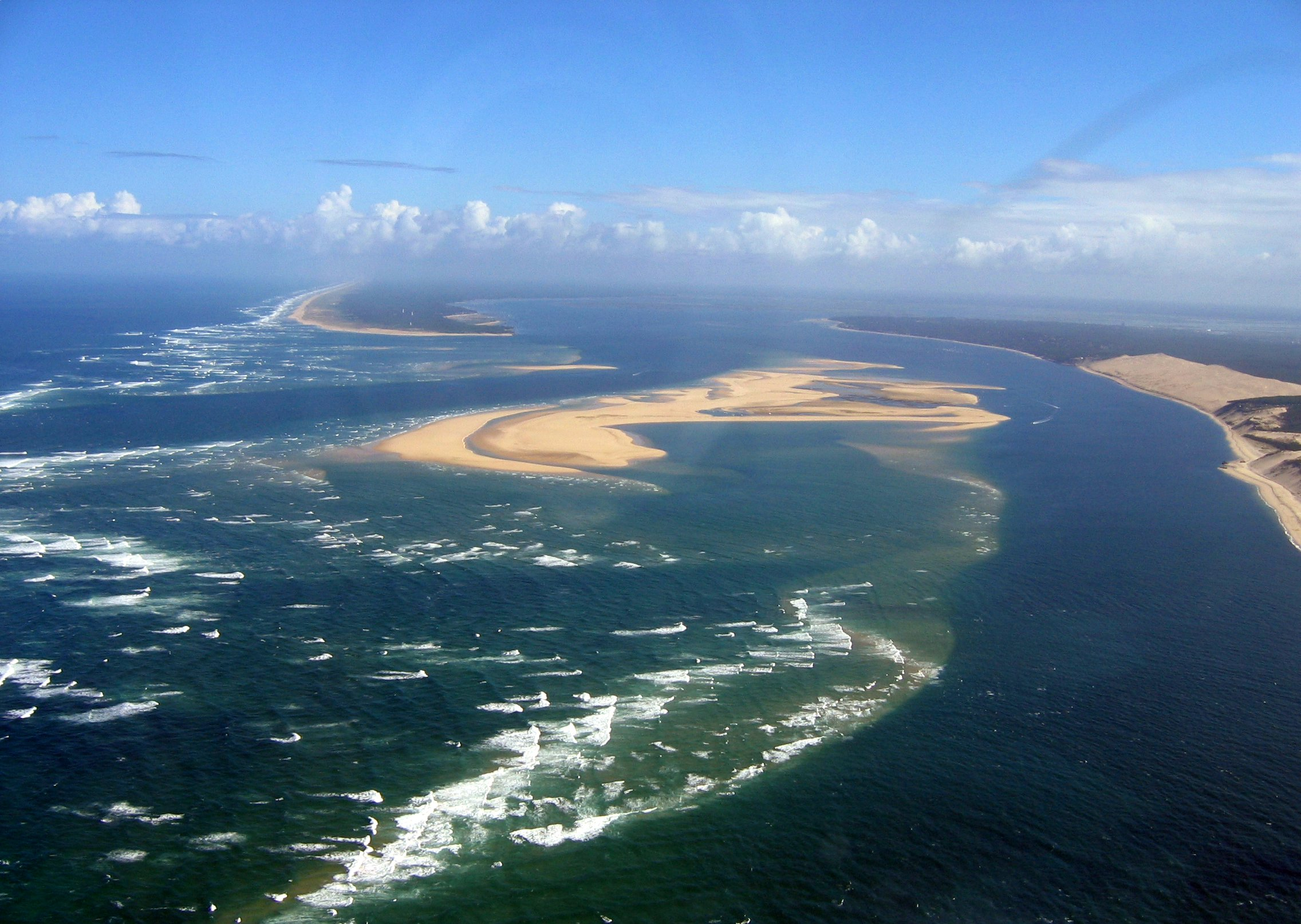
- Arcachon Bay and the Dune of Pilat (on the right)

- Coordinates: 44°41′N 01°10′W
- Part of: Atlantic Ocean

Ramsar Wetland
- Official name: Bassin d'Arcachon - Secteur du delta de l'Eyre
- Designated: 27 October 2011
- Reference no.: 1996

Arcachon Basin or alternatively Arcachon Bay (French: Bassin d'Arcachon, French pronunciation: [basɛ̃ daʁkaʃɔ̃]; Gascon: Laca d'Arcaishon) is a bay of the Atlantic Ocean on the southwest coast of France, situated in Pays de Buch between the Côte d'Argent and the Côte des Landes, in the region of Aquitaine. The bay covers an area of 150 square kilometres (60 sq mi) at high tide and 40 km^{2} (15 sq mi) at low tide. Some of its geological features are natural preservation areas.

The general shape of the Bassin d'Arcachon is that of an equilateral triangle pointing north, the southwest corner of which is open to the sea, between Cap Ferret and the town of Arcachon (more specifically, one of the suburbs of La Teste-de-Buch, Pyla-sur-Mer), through a three-kilometre-long (2 mi) narrow channel (Les Passes). On the north shore is the town of Arès, then Andernos-les-Bains on the northeast. Just south of the entrance is the Dune of Pilat. Nearly in the middle of the bay is a very particular island: L'île aux Oiseaux (Isle of the Birds).

== Development ==
In the past, similar areas became lakes (called in French lacs or étangs) and are nowadays filled with fresh water. On the French Atlantic coast, running north–south between the Gironde estuary to the Adour River mouth, are the Lac d'Hourtin-Carcans, the Lac de Lacanau, the Étang de Cazaux et de Sanguinet, the Étang de Biscarrosse et de Parentis, the Étang d'Aureilhan, the Étang de Léon, the Étang de Soustons, Étang Hardy, Étang Blanc and the Étang de Garros. Arcachon Bay is the last water area that remains open to the ocean.

The Bassin still has a link to the sea, possibly due to the Eyre River that runs from the Landes forest and has its mouth (Delta de l'Eyre) in its southeast corner. Otherwise, the Bassin would have become blocked by the sandbanks built up by the tides.

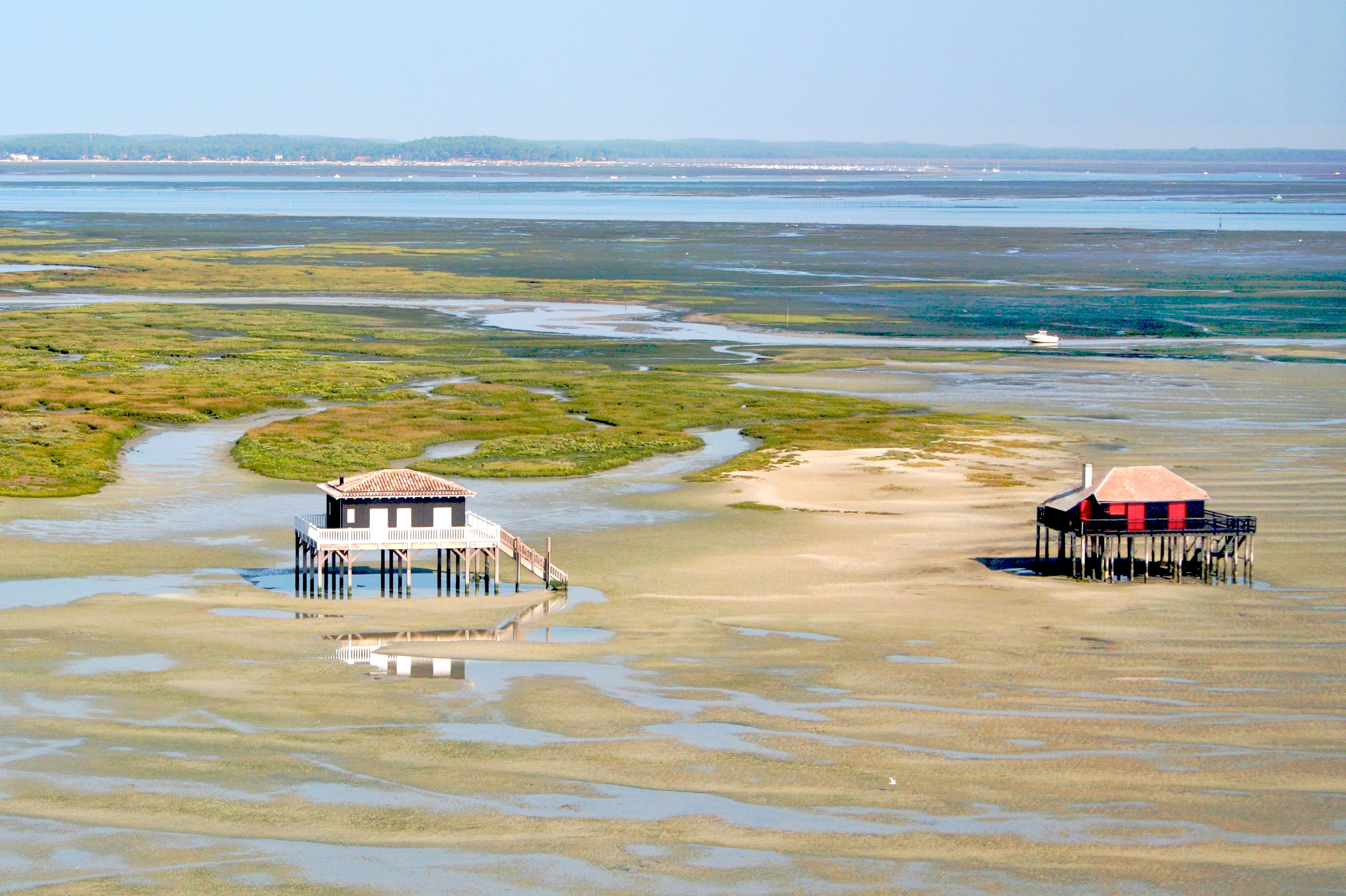
Cabanes tchanquées on the Isle of Birds, near Arcachon

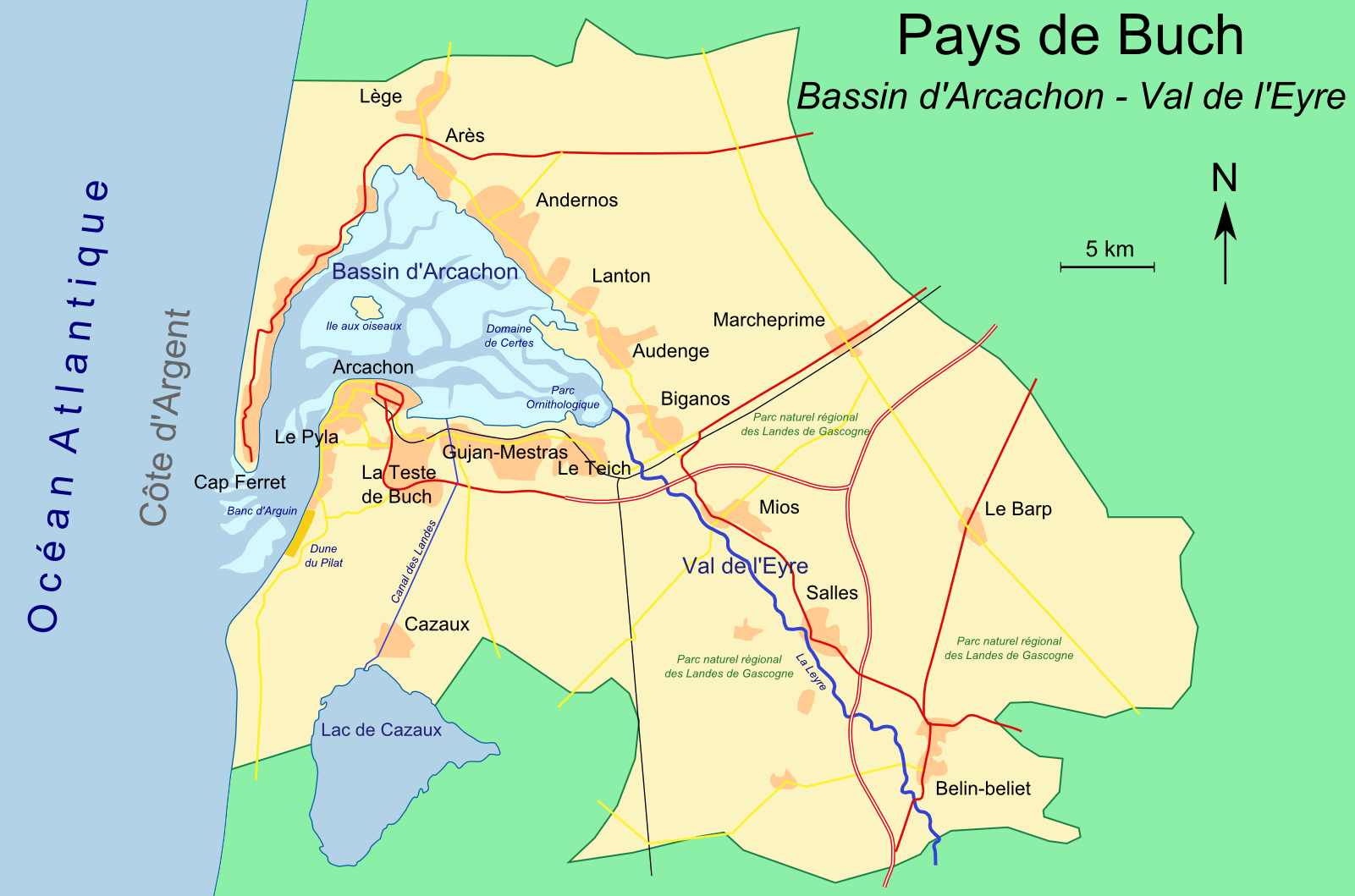
Map of the Bassin d'Arcachon

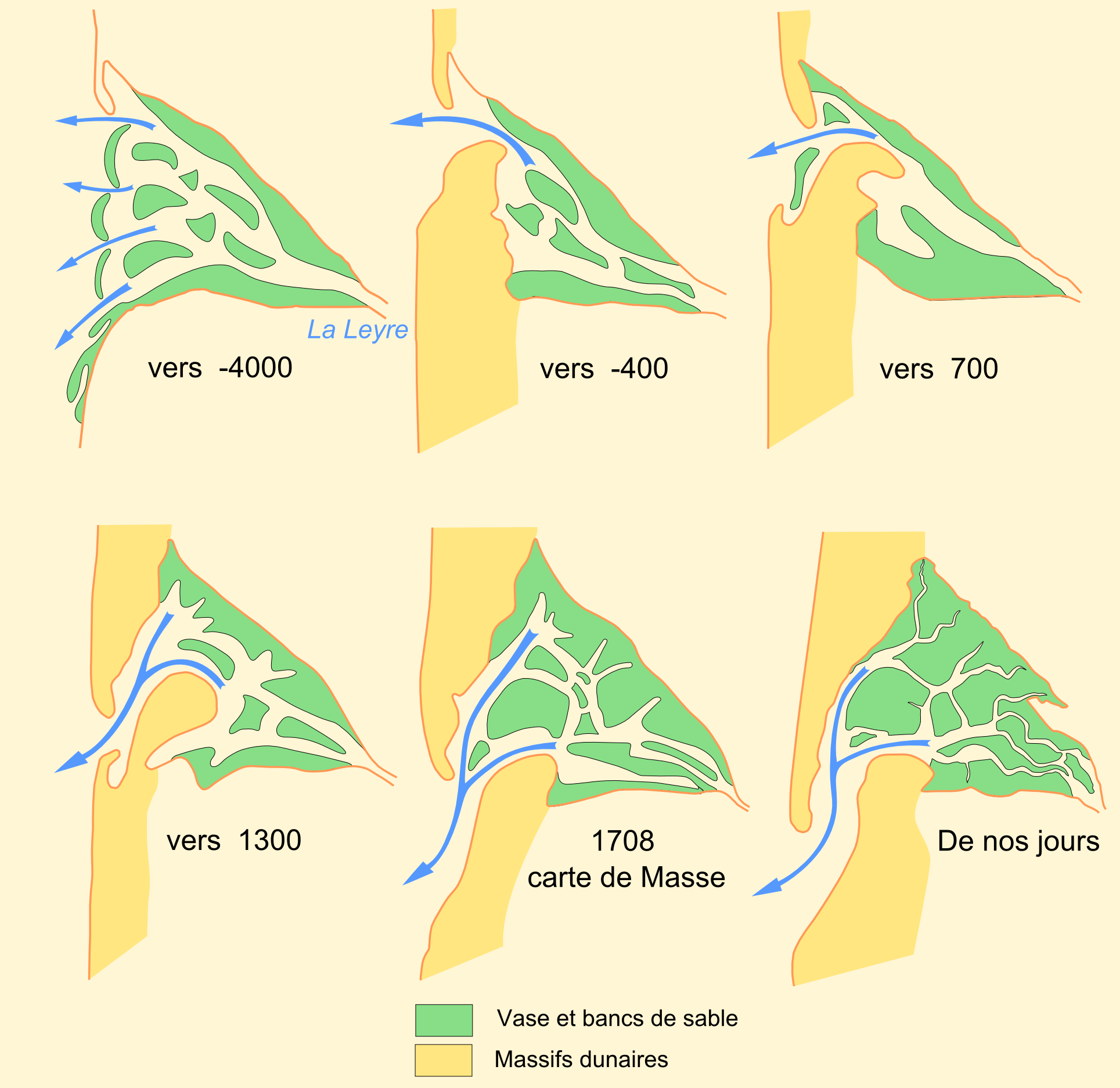
Formation of the Bassin d'Arcachon at 4000 BC, 400 BC, 700 AD, 1300 AD, 1708 AD and today. Green areas are mud and sand bars. Beige areas are sand dunes.

== Arcachon Bay fish ==
The brackish and productive waters of the Bay of Arcachon make them ideal for hosting a wide variety of organisms, including but not limited to those belonging to the families Sparidae, Mugilidae, and Triglidae. This fauna is typical from shallow-temperate waters and generally common along the northeastern and eastern Atlantic Ocean and the Mediterranean sea.

Twenty-seven species of fish found in Arcachon bay include:

Within the family Sparidae:

- Boops boops also known by the name of Bogue
- Pagellus bogaraveo also known by the name of Blackspot seabream
- Dentex dentex also known by the name of Common dentex
- Diplodus annularis also known by the name of Annular seabream
- Pagellus erythrinus also known by the name of King of the breams
- Sarpa salpa also known by the name of Dreamfish
- Diplodus puntazzo also known by the name of Sheapshed seabream
- Diplodus sargus also known by the name of White seabream
- Lithognathus mormyrus also known by the name of Striped seabream
- Spondyliosoma cantharus also known by the name of Black seabream
- Pagellus acarne also known by the name of Spanish seabream
- Pagrus pagrus also known by the name of Red porgy
- Diplodos cervinus also known by the name of Zebra seabream
- Diplodus vulgaris also known by the name of Two banded seabream
- Oblada melanura also known by the name of Saddled seabream

Within the Mugilidae family:

- Liza ramada also known by the name of Thin-lipped mullet
- Chelon labrosus also known by the name of Thick-lipped mullet
- Liza saliens also known by the name of Leaping mullet
- Liza aurata also known by the name of Golden grey mullet
- Mugil chephalus also known by the name of Striped mullet
- Oedalechilus labeo also known by the name of Boxlip mullet

Within the Triglidae family:

- Aspitrigla cuculus also known by the name of Red gurnard
- Trigla lucerna also known by the name of Tub gurnard
- Eutrigla gurnardus also known by the name of Grey gurnard
- Trigloporus lastoviza also known by the name of Streaked gurnard
- Trigla lyra also known by the name of Piper
- Aspitrigla obscura also known by the name of Long-finned gurnard

Arcachon Bay has been experiencing a decrease in the number of these particular species within the general area of the bay. The decreasing population of these species can be attributed to their low fertility rates and inherent low mortality rates, with humans representing their primary threat as predators.

Additionally, other species within the area include; Phocoenidae (porpoises), Squatina (angel sharks), Bathytoshia (stingrays), and Crassostrea gigas (oysters). Arcachon Bay has been continuously well renowned for its oyster cultivation, fishing, and recreational boating pursuits. Oysters are a key species to the area of Arcachon Bay. Throughout the years Arcachon Bay has been known for its plentiful supply of oysters, making it a known and common place for oyster farming and fishing. These oysters have been in much demand in the French market as there has been a robust gathering of 7,000 tons within the area as of 2017. However, since 1998 there has been a decline in oyster population due to both human and environmental influences. Much of this can be attributed to pollution. These changes in the natural habitat have led to higher mortality rates, reducing much of the oyster population. An important species contributing not only to diversity but also the progression of human development over the years.

== See also ==
- Pinasse from the Arcachon basin
