= Klaus Wolfgang Niemöller =

German musicologist (1929–2024)

- Born: 21 July 1929; Gelsenkirchen, Westphalia, Prussia, Germany
- Died: 13 April 2024 (aged 94); Cologne, North Rhine-Westphalia, Germany
- Occupation: Musicologist

Klaus Wolfgang Niemöller (21 July 1929 – 13 April 2024) was a German musicologist.

== Life and career ==
Niemöller studied musicology at the University of Cologne from 1950 to 1955. Afterwards he received his doctorate with a dissertation on Nicolaus Wollick and in 1964 his habilitation with Untersuchungen zu Musikpflege und Musikunterricht in den deutschen Lateinschulen vom ausgehenden Middle Ages bis um 1600. In 1969 he was appointed professor.

From 1975 to 1983, Niemöller was director of the musicological seminar of the Westfälische Wilhelms-Universität in Münster and from 1983 to 1994 director of the musicological institute of the University of Cologne. Niemöller was chairman of the Joseph Haydn Institute in Cologne and the Robert Schumann Research Centre in Düsseldorf as well as president of the Gesellschaft für Musikforschung.

From 1976, Niemöller was a full member of the North Rhine-Westphalian Academy of Sciences, Humanities and the Arts. His focus was on medieval music theory, and on the music history of the 19th and 20th centuries.

Niemöller died in Cologne on 13 April 2024, at the age of 94.

== Publications ==
- Nicolaus Wollick (1480–1541) und sein Musiktraktat, Dissertation Cologne 1956 (Beiträge zur rheinischen Musikgeschichte 13).
- Untersuchungen zu Musikpflege und Musikunterricht an den deutschen Lateinschulen vom ausgehenden Mittelalter bis um 1600, Habilitationsschrift Regensburg 1969 (Kölner Beiträge zur Musikforschung 54).
- Der sprachhafte Charakter der Musik, Opladen 1980.

=== Essays ===
- Die musikalische Rhetorik und ihre Genese in Musik und Musikanschauung der Renaissance, p. 285–315.
- Robert Schumann und Giacomo Meyerbeer, in: Kongress Bericht 5. Internationales Schumann-Symposion Düsseldorf 1994, Mainz 1997, p. 97–106 (Schumann Forschungen 6).
- Zusammenprall christlicher und antiker Überlieferungen, in Musikästhetik, edit. H. de la Motte-Haber, Laaber 2004, p. 92–109 (Handbuch der Systematischen Musikwissenschaft 1).

=== Editorial board ===
- Kölner Beiträge zur Musikforschung
- Schumann Forschungen
- Robert Schumann: Neue Ausgabe sämtlicher Werke
