= Statue of Heracles, Arcachon =

1948 statue by Claude Bouscau in Arcachon, France

Coordinates: 44°39′28.6″N 1°10′23.1″W

A Statue of Heracles (French: Statue d'Héraclès) stands in the Parc Mauresque in Arcachon, in the southwestern French department of Gironde. The marble statue by local sculptor Claude Bouscau was installed in 1948 to commemorate the actions of the French Resistance in fighting German occupying forces during the Second World War. The statue of the ancient Greek hero Heracles stands 3.1 metres (10 ft) tall, nude except for the skin of the defeated Nemean lion.

Bouscau reduced the size of the statue's penis on two occasions shortly after its installation, following complaints from local women. The penis was frequently stolen, and in 2016 the city council decided it would not be replaced permanently but instead a temporary penis would be installed when public events were held near the statue.

== Commission ==
The city of Arcachon, Gironde, sought to commemorate the efforts of the French Resistance during the Second World War. Locally born sculptor Claude Bouscau was asked to design a sculpture to stand in the city's Parc Mauresque ("Moorish Park"). Bouscau proposed two reliefs depicting the figures of "Victory" and "Resistance" together with a fire bowl. The city rejected this proposal as too expensive. Bouscau instead proposed that one of his existing works, a statue of the Greek hero Heracles, be erected.

== Statue ==
The 3.1-metre (10 ft) high Carrara marble sculpture depicts Heracles triumphing over the Nemean lion, the first of his twelve labours, which would stand for the allied victory over Nazi Germany. The statue had been made in 1936-39, while Bouscau was living in Rome after he had won the Prix de Rome for sculpture in 1935. Its model was an opponent of the fascist dictator Benito Mussolini. Heracles is naked apart from the pelt of the lion, which he wears on his head in the manner of a cape. His right hand holds, behind his back, the club he used to daze the animal while his left hand holds two snakes.

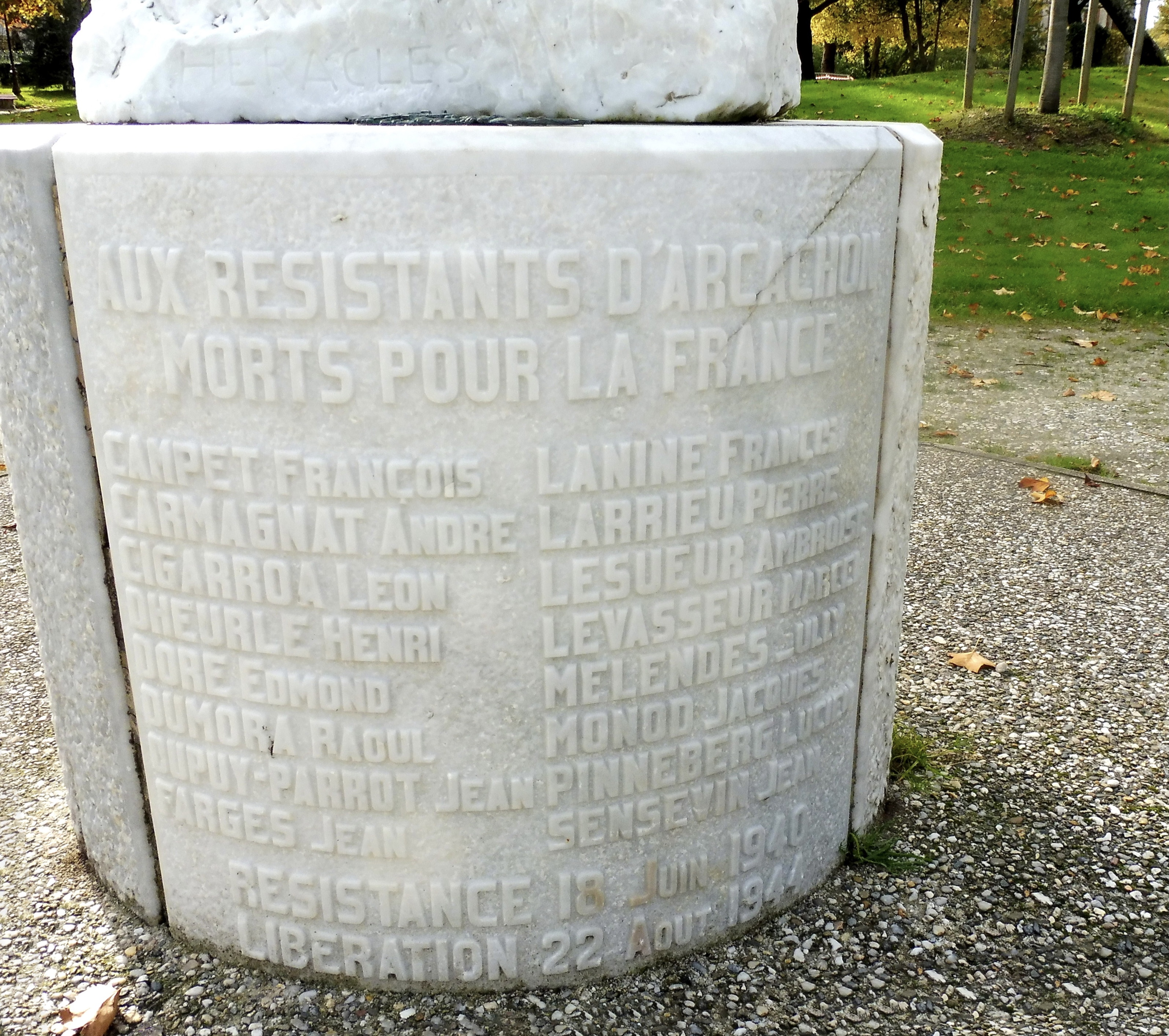
Detail of pedestal listing local resistance agents who were killed in the war

The sculpted figure of Heracles stands on a cylindrical base bears the inscription "Aux résistants d'Arcachon morts pour la France" with 16 names, and then "Résistance 18 June 1940 / Libération 22 August 1944". A bronze plaque records that the memorial was inaugurated on 22 August 1948 by Admiral Philippe Auboyneau, former commander of the Free French naval forces in the Second World War. A freestanding panel nearby displays words attributed to General de Gaulle in his Appeal of 18 June 1940, that France has lost the battle but not the war.

Several other Bouscau sculptures are displayed in the town, including the 1935 relief of Christ stripped of his clothes that won the Premier Grand Prix de Rome for sculpture in 1935, a statue of the Virgin Mary and another of a female bather, a statue of a woman with a dolphin, a statue of Robert Martin, and a monument to sailors perished at sea (Monument aux marins péris en mer).

== Penis ==
Soon after its installation Bouscau twice reduced the size of the statue's penis, following complaints from local women that it was too large. This despite Heracles being regarded as a symbol of virility by the Ancient Greeks.

The penis of the statue has been stolen and not recovered on numerous occasions. When it was stolen in June 2010 it took until January 2011 for a replacement to be installed. By 2016 the mayor's office had a mould of the penis from which replacements were cast. In 2016 the mayor, Yves Foulon, stated "I wouldn't want anyone – not even my worst enemies – to go through what happens to this statue" and the absence of the penis caused embarrassment to the council during some ceremonies held at the statue.

In 2016 it was decided by the council to not replace the penis. Instead a detachable penis was fabricated and it would only be installed during public events held at the statue. The deputy mayor Martine Phellipot was inspired to commission the detachable penis by her medical background. She noted "We chose the option of making a removable prosthesis which is placed on the statue before each ceremony. It's the only way to avoid constantly chasing after his anatomy". The detachable penis was made by Thomas Castelnau, an artist employed by the city council. The penis screws into the statue; when it is absent only a thin metal rod remains.
