= Château Deganne =

Château in Nouvelle-Aquitaine, France

Coordinates: 44°39′47″N 1°09′52″W

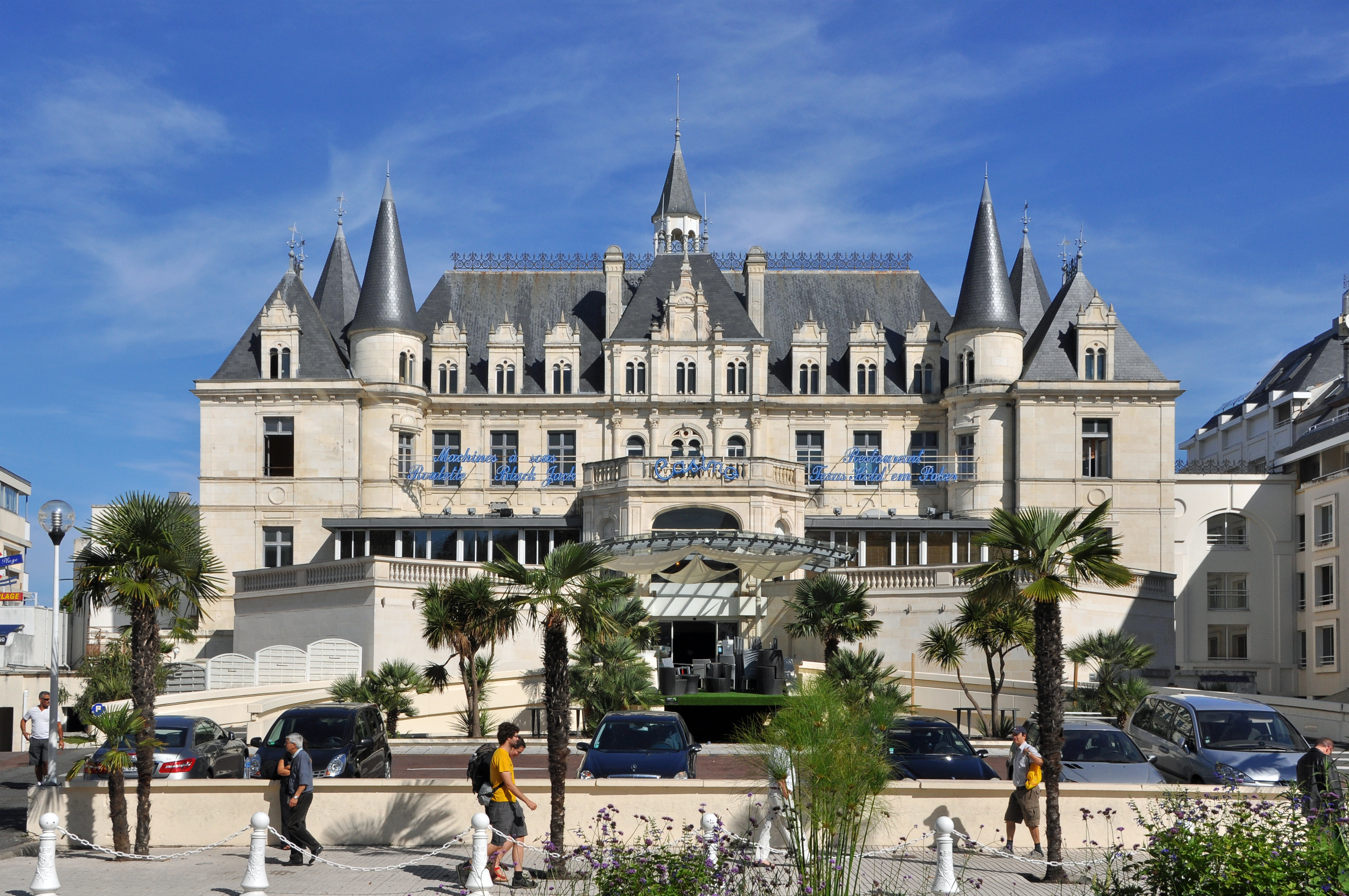

Château Deganne is a château in Gironde, Nouvelle-Aquitaine, France.
