= Arcachon =

Arcachon Arcaishon (Occitan)
- Subprefecture and commune
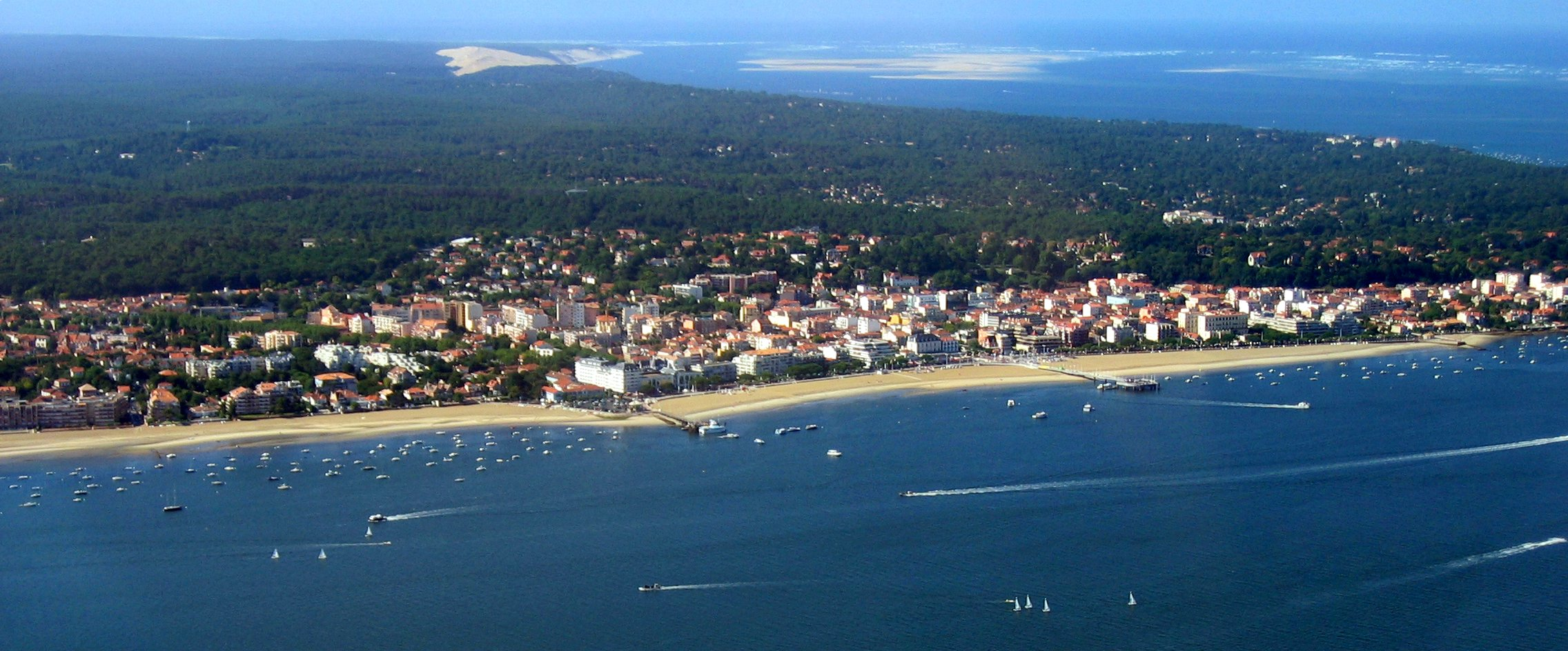
- Arcachon, the Landes forest and the Dune of Pilat

- Flag Coat of arms
- Location of Arcachon
- Location within France Location within Nouvelle-Aquitaine
- Coordinates: 44°39′N 1°10′W
- Country: France
- Region: Nouvelle-Aquitaine
- Department: Gironde
- Arrondissement: Arcachon
- Canton: La Teste-de-Buch
- Intercommunality: CA Bassin d'Arcachon Sud

Government
  - Mayor (2020–2026): Yves Foulon
- Area^{1}: 7.56 km^{2} (2.92 sq mi)
- Elevation: 8 m (26 ft)
- Highest elevation: 45 m (148 ft)
- Lowest elevation: 0 m (0 ft)
- Population (2023): 11,092
  - Density: 1,470/km^{2} (3,800/sq mi)
- Demonym: Arcachonnais
- Time zone: UTC+01:00 (CET)
  - Summer (DST): UTC+02:00 (CEST)
- INSEE/Postal code: 33009 /33120
- Website: www.ville-arcachon.fr
- ^{1} French Land Register data, which excludes lakes, ponds, glaciers > 1 km^{2} (0.386 sq mi or 247 acres) and river estuaries.

Arcachon (French: [aʁkaʃɔ̃]; Gascon: Arcaishon) is a subprefecture in the southwestern French department of Gironde. It is a popular seaside resort on the Atlantic coast 55 kilometres (34 mi) southwest of Bordeaux, in the Landes forest. It has a sandy beach and a mild climate, said to be favourable for people suffering from pulmonary complaints.

== History ==
On 2 May 1857, Emperor Napoleon III signed an imperial decree declaring that Arcachon was now an autonomous municipality; coincidentally, the railway line extension from Bordeaux to Arcachon had been completed that same year. At that time, Arcachon was scarcely more than a forest of pine trees, oaks and strawberry trees (arbutus), with no road links and few real houses and a population fewer than 400 people, mostly fishermen and peasants. In earlier years, when some hygienists began to recommend sea bathing, three sea establishments were laid out by investors to attract the Bordeaux bourgeoisie and other wealthy people. This was the beginning of a new lifestyle and some of the locals got the opportunity to claim their independence from La Teste-de-Buch, which owned their properties, in order to found a "free" new town, Arcachon. Until 1950, tuberculosis patients also visited Arcachon for fresh-air treatments.

Arcachon is known for the "Arcachonnaise", the local name for an Arcachon villa, the architectural style of many of the older houses built there in the nineteenth century.

The United States Navy established a naval air station in the area on 8 June 1918 to operate seaplanes during World War I. The base closed shortly after the First Armistice at Compiègne.

== Population ==
The historic populations of Arcachon from 1861 until 2023 are shown in the table below.

Historical population

Year	Pop.	±% p.a.
1861	736	—
1866	2,065	+22.92%
1872	3,696	+10.19%
1876	4,981	+7.74%
1881	7,133	+7.45%
1886	8,102	+2.58%
1891	7,910	−0.48%
1896	8,221	+0.77%
1901	8,259	+0.09%
1906	9,279	+2.36%
1911	10,266	+2.04%
1921	10,634	+0.35%
1926	12,261	+2.89%
1931	13,135	+1.39%

Year	Pop.	±% p.a.
1936	13,102	−0.05%
1946	14,603	+1.09%
1954	14,985	+0.32%
1962	14,862	−0.10%
1968	14,986	+0.14%
1975	13,892	−1.08%
1982	13,293	−0.63%
1990	11,770	−1.51%
1999	11,454	−0.30%
2007	11,679	+0.24%
2012	11,307	−0.65%
2017	11,284	−0.04%
2023	11,092	−0.29%

Source: EHESS and INSEE (1968–2023)

== Geography ==
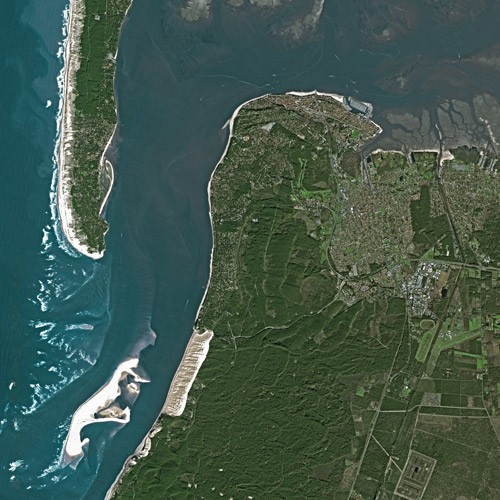
Arcachon seen by satellite

At its southern entrance from the Atlantic Ocean, Arcachon Bay is crowned by Europe's largest sand dune, the Dune du Pilat, nearly 3 kilometres (1.9 miles) long, 500 metres (1,600 feet) wide, reaching 110 metres (360 feet) in height, and moving inland at rate of 5 metres (16 feet) a year. Arcachon is one of the largest towns within the Landes forest, alongside Dax and Mont-de-Marsan. The bay provides excellent conditions for growing oysters and around 175 hectares of the bay is dedicated to oyster farming.

The city enjoys a mild climate thanks to the Gulf Stream, a warm and swift Atlantic ocean current originating from the gulf of Mexico.

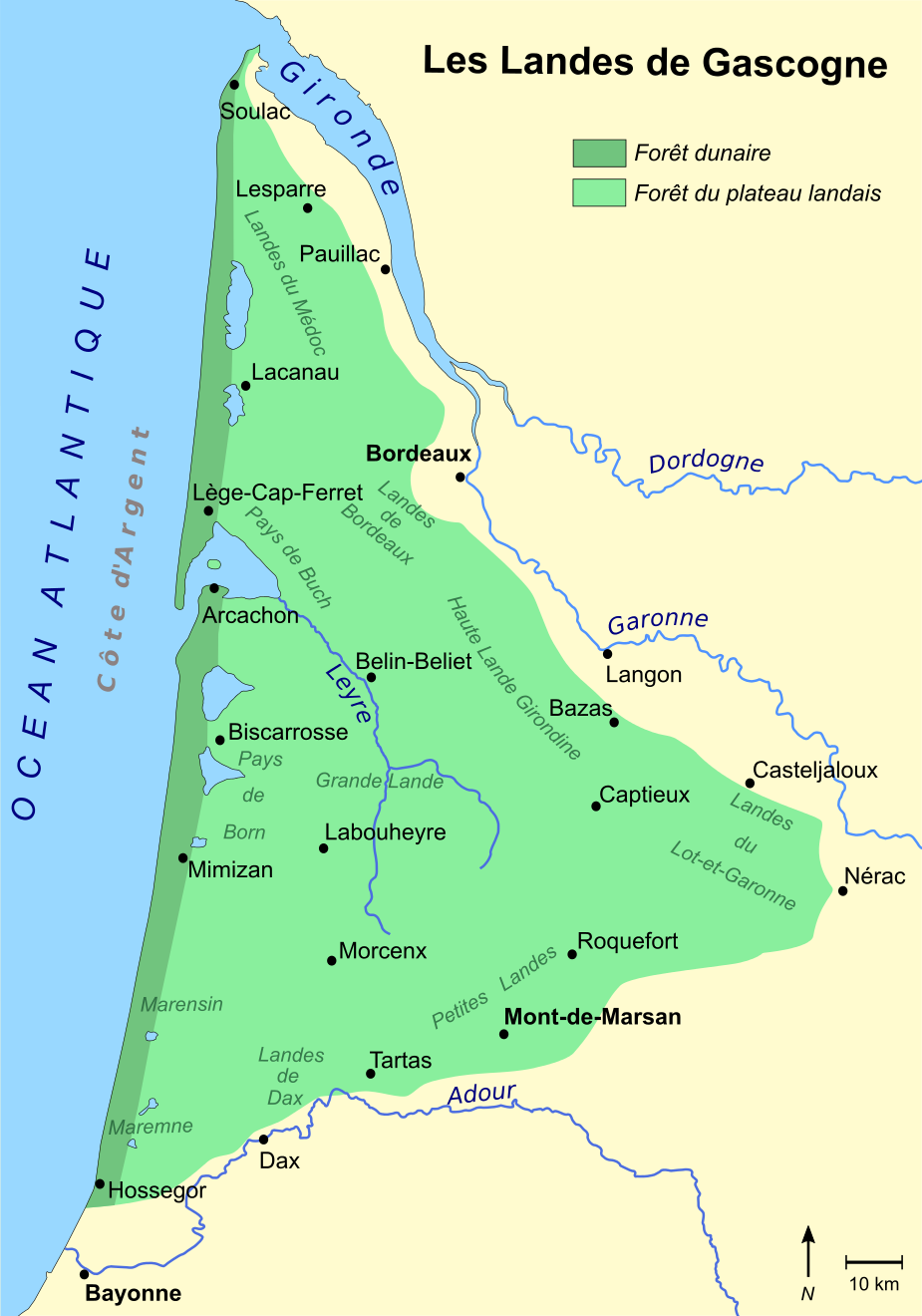
Map of Landes of Gascony

== Transport ==
The nearest airport is Bordeaux–Mérignac Airport. Arcachon station is daily served by the TER Nouvelle-Aquitaine trains from Bordeaux and also by the TGV Atlantique from Paris on weekends. Public transportation is operated by buses. Boat excursions around Arcachon Bay are provided for tourism, and boat shuttles offer transport to Cap Ferret, the Dune of Pilat, Le Canon, Le Moulleau, Andernos and Banc D'Arguin.

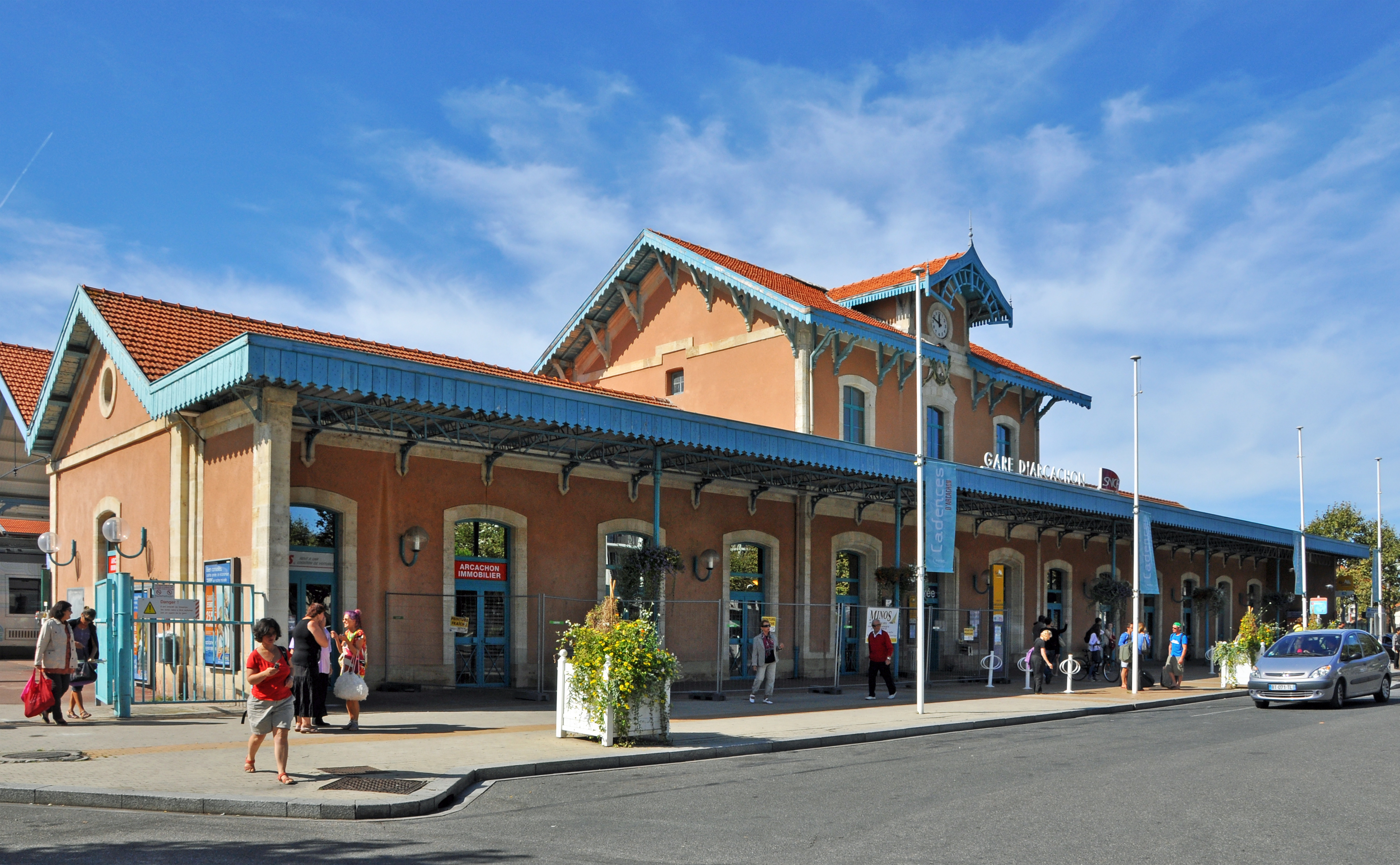
Arcachon railway station

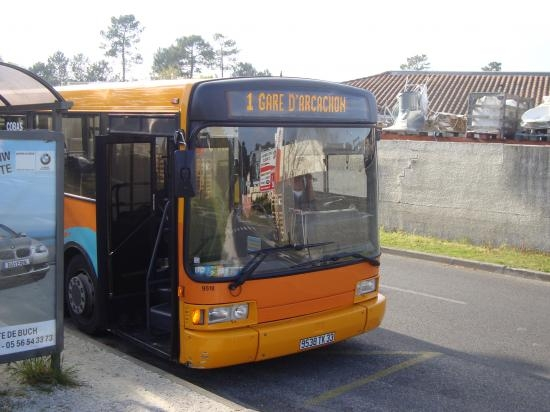
City buses

== People ==
- Humbert Balsan - film producer, was born in Arcachon in 1954.
- Carmen Bernos de Gasztold - poet, was born in Arcachon in 1919.
- Sylvie Caster - writer and journalist, was born in Arcachon in 1952.
- Alexandre Dumas - writer, once lived in Arcachon's Ville d'Hiver.
- Ramón Emeterio Betances - Puerto Rican politician, spent close to six months at Arcachon shortly before his death in 1898.
- Jean Périsson - composer, was born here in 1924
- Louise Talma - composer, was born here in 1906.
- Charles Tournemire - composer-organist, died here in 1939.

On the other side of the Bassin d'Arcachon is Cap Ferret, a popular resort for celebrities including Zinedine Zidane and Jean Pierre Pernaut, who have holiday homes.

== Twin towns – sister cities ==
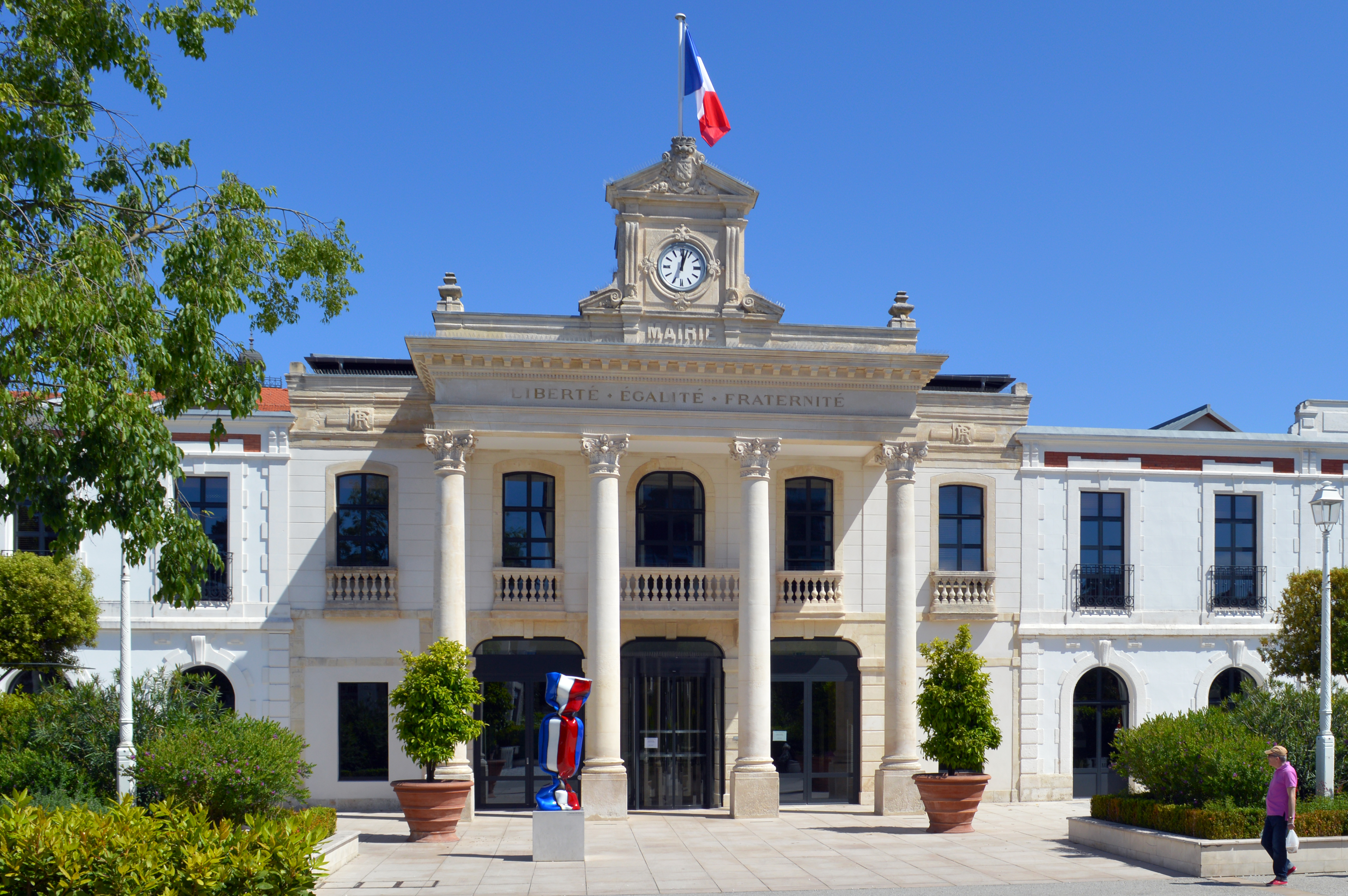
Town hall of Arcachon

Arcachon is twinned with:

- Aveiro, Portugal
- Gardone Riviera, Italy
- Goslar, Germany
- Pescara, Italy
- Amherst, Massachusetts, United States

== See also ==
- Dune du Pilat
- Communes of the Gironde department
- Château Deganne
- Our Lady of Arcachon
- Statue of Heracles, Arcachon
