= Étang de Lacanau =

Lake in France

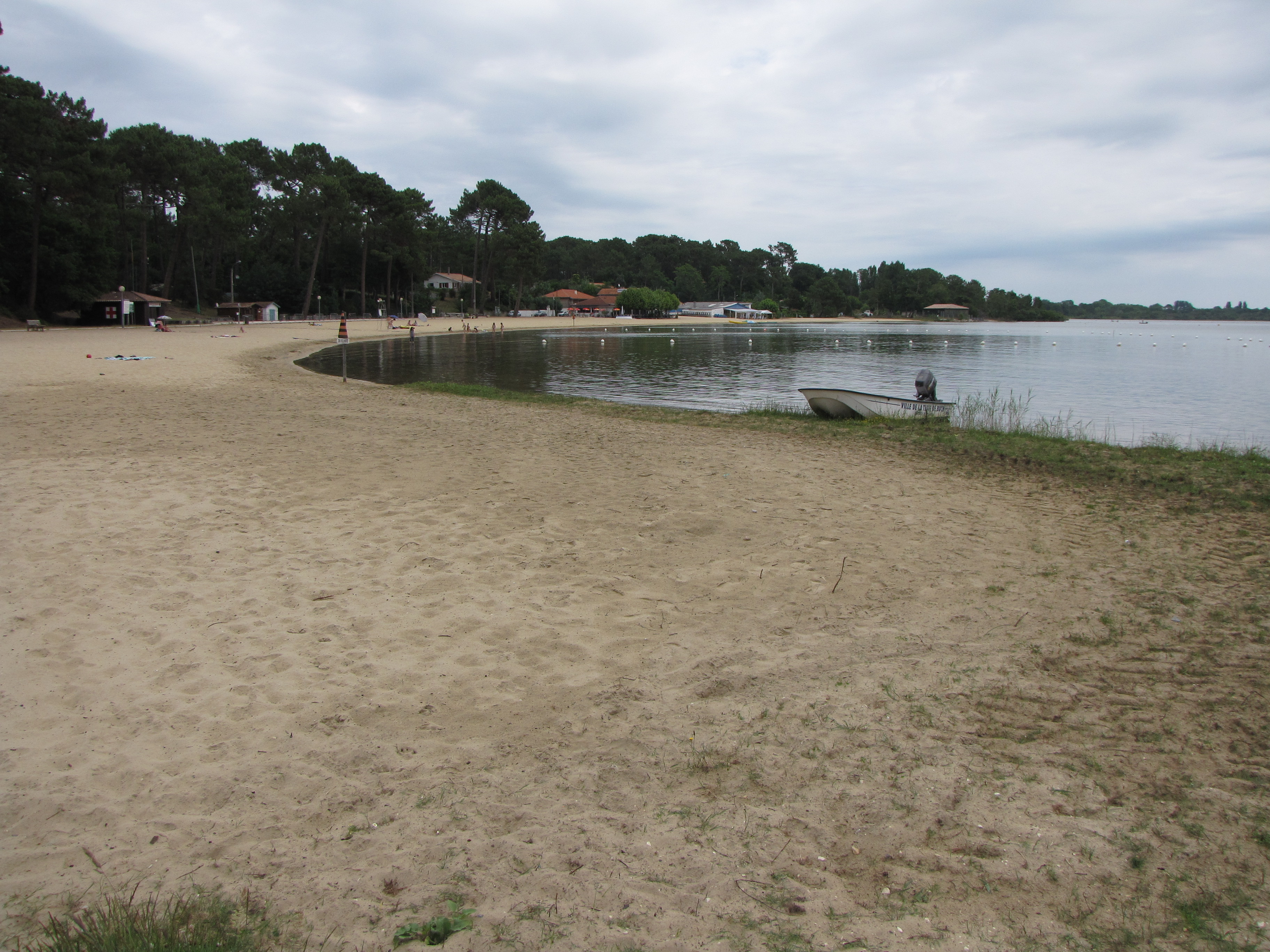

- Location within France
- Location: Lacanau, Gironde
- Coordinates: 44°58′N 1°07′W
- Basin countries: France
- Surface area: 19.85 km^{2} (7.66 sq mi)

Étang de Lacanau is a lake in Lacanau, Gironde, France. Its surface area is 19.85 km²
