= A63 autoroute =

Road in France

A63 autoroute
- Autoroute de la Côte basque Autoroute des Landes (since 2014)

Route information
- Part of E5 / E70 / E80
- Maintained by ASF, Atlandes and DIR Atlantique
- Length: 206 km (128 mi)
- Existed: 1972–present

Major junctions
- South end: E5 / E70 / E80 / AP-8 at France–Spain border in Biriatou

- E80 / A 64 in Saint-Pierre-d'Irube; A 660 in Mios

- North end: E5 / E70 / A 630 in Pessac

Location
- Country: France
- Major cities: Saint-Jean-de-Luz, Biarritz, Anglet, Bayonne, Bordeaux

Highway system
- Roads in France; Autoroutes; Routes nationales

The A63 autoroute is a motorway in southwest France, connecting Bordeaux (from Junction 15 of the Rocade) to the border with Spain and Basque Country via the Autopista AP-8. The motorway, rather than being a purpose-built route, is an upgrade of the former RN10, which became a full toll road and no longer exists south of Bordeaux. The motorway crosses Les Landes (moorland) as a dual-carriageway.

== Route ==
The A63 connects the border with Spain at Biriatou (close to Hendaye) at the southern edge of the Landes (department) towards Bordeaux which it reaches at junction 15 of rocade).

It is part of the Autoroute des Estuaires and is used by lorries from all over Europe heading to the Iberian Peninsula. In addition, the road is connected at Bayonne with the A64 to Pau, Tarbes and Toulouse.

The northern section has junctions with the A660.

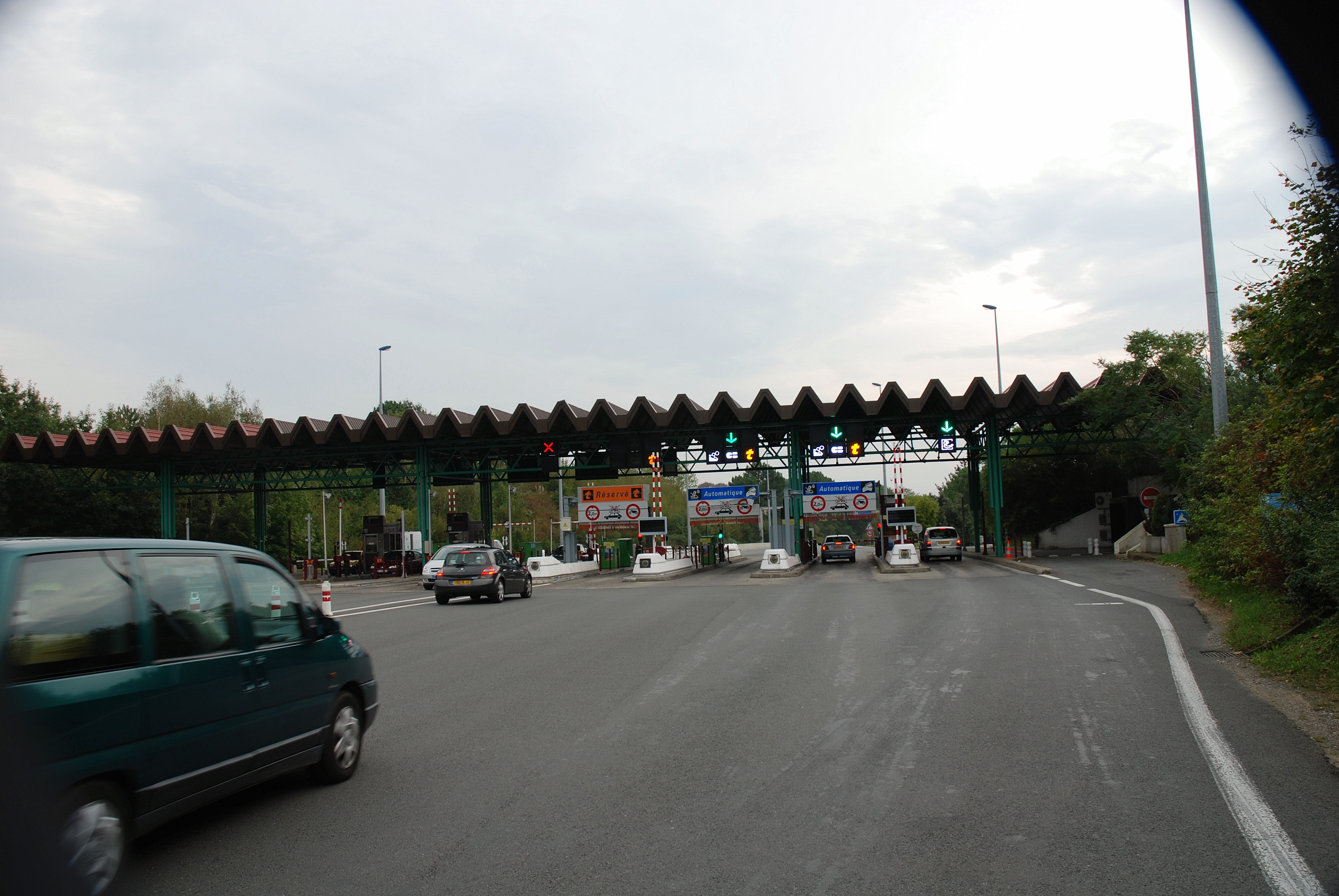
Péage of the Negress with Biarritz

== History ==
- The A63 was operated by the Autoroute Company de la Cote Basque (ACOBA) in 1984.
- The first section to open was the by-pass of Saint-Jean-de-Luz in 1972.
- ACOBA was integrated into the ASF.

== List of exits and junctions ==
Region	Department	Junction	Destinations	Notes
Nouvelle-Aquitaine	Pyrénées-Atlantiques	1 : Biriatou	Hendaye, Biriatou	
Nouvelle-Aquitaine	Pyrénées-Atlantiques	Péage de Biriatou		
Nouvelle-Aquitaine	Pyrénées-Atlantiques	Aire d'Urrugne (Northbound)		
Nouvelle-Aquitaine	Pyrénées-Atlantiques	2 : Saint-Jean-de-Luz - sud	Saint-Jean-de-Luz, Urrugne, Ciboure, Hendaye - Plage, Col d'Ibardin	
Nouvelle-Aquitaine	Pyrénées-Atlantiques	3 : Saint Jean de Luz - nord	Saint-Jean-de-Luz, Ascain, Guéthary, Saint-Pée-sur-Nivelle	
Nouvelle-Aquitaine	Pyrénées-Atlantiques	Aire de Bidart		
Nouvelle-Aquitaine	Pyrénées-Atlantiques	4 : Biarritz	Biarritz, Bidart, Aéroport, Saint-Pée-sur-Nivelle	
Nouvelle-Aquitaine	Pyrénées-Atlantiques	Péage de Biarritz		
Nouvelle-Aquitaine	Pyrénées-Atlantiques	5 : Bayonne - sud	Bayonne - centre, Saint Léon, Anglet, Cambo-les-Bains, Saint-Jean-Pied-de-Port, Ustaritz	
Nouvelle-Aquitaine	Pyrénées-Atlantiques	A64 - A63	Toulouse, Tarbes, Lourdes, Pau, Peyrehorade, Orthez, Mouguerre, Saint-Pierre-d'Irube, Bayonne - Mousserolles	
Nouvelle-Aquitaine	Pyrénées-Atlantiques	E5 / E70 / E80 / A 63 becomes E5 / E70 / A 63		
Nouvelle-Aquitaine	Pyrénées-Atlantiques	6 : Bayonne - nord	Bayonne - centre, Saint Esprit, Saint-Martin-de-Seignanx, Orthez, Peyrehorade, Pau	
Nouvelle-Aquitaine	Landes	7 : Ondres	Zone Portuaire, Boucau, Tarnos, Ondres, Labenne, Pau, Saint-Martin-de-Seignanx	
Nouvelle-Aquitaine	Landes	Aire de Labenne		
Nouvelle-Aquitaine	Landes	8 : Capbreton	Seignosse, Capbreton, Hossegor, Bénesse-Maremne, Saint-Vincent-de-Tyrosse, Labenne	
Nouvelle-Aquitaine	Landes	Aire de Saubion		
Nouvelle-Aquitaine	Landes	Péage de Bénesse-Maremne		
Nouvelle-Aquitaine	Landes	9 : Saint-Geours-de-Maremne	Mont de Marsan, Dax	
Nouvelle-Aquitaine	Landes	10 : Soustons	Saint-Geours-de-Maremne, Soustons, Azur, Vieux-Boucau-les-Bains, Atlantis Sud, Peyrehorade, Saint-Vincent-de-Tyrosse	
Nouvelle-Aquitaine	Landes	11 : Magescq	Messanges, Vieux-Boucau-les-Bains, Magescq, Moliets-et-Maa	
Nouvelle-Aquitaine	Landes	Aire de Magescq		
Nouvelle-Aquitaine	Landes	Péage de Castets		
Nouvelle-Aquitaine	Landes	12 : Castets	Castets, Linxe, Vielle-Saint-Girons, Dax, Moliets-et-Maâ	
Nouvelle-Aquitaine	Landes	12.1 : Castets - est	Castets, Taller	
Nouvelle-Aquitaine	Landes	Aire de l'Océan		
Nouvelle-Aquitaine	Landes	13 : Lesperon	Lesperon, Tartas, Lit-et-Mixe, Rion-des-Landes	
Nouvelle-Aquitaine	Landes	14 : Laharie	Morcenx, Mimizan, Contis - Plage, Onesse-Laharie	
Nouvelle-Aquitaine	Landes	Aire d'Onesse-et-Laharie		
Nouvelle-Aquitaine	Landes	15 : Cap de Pin	Escource, Sabres, Solférino, Écomusée de Marquèze, Sabres	
Nouvelle-Aquitaine	Landes	16 : Labouheyre	Labouheyre, Lüe, Pontenx-les-Forges, Mimizan, Commensacq	
Nouvelle-Aquitaine	Landes	Aire de Labouheyre		
Nouvelle-Aquitaine	Landes	17 : Lipsothey	Biscarrosse, Parentis-en-Born, Liposthey	
Nouvelle-Aquitaine	Landes	Péage de Saugnac-et-Muret		
Nouvelle-Aquitaine	Landes	Aire de la Porte des Landes		
Nouvelle-Aquitaine	Landes	18 : Le Muret	Saugnac-et-Muret, Moustey, Parc naturel régional des Landes de Gascogne, Mont-de-Marsan	
Nouvelle-Aquitaine	Gironde	20 Belin-Béliet	Belin-Béliet, Lugos	Entry and exit from Spain
Nouvelle-Aquitaine	Gironde	Aire de Lugos		
Nouvelle-Aquitaine	Gironde	21 : Salles	Belin-Béliet, Z. I. Belin-Béliet, Hostens, Salles, Mios	
Nouvelle-Aquitaine	Gironde	A660 - A63	Gujan-Mestras, Arcachon, Bassin d'Arcachon, Biscarrosse	
Nouvelle-Aquitaine	Gironde	23 : Le Barp	Lacanau, Le Barp, Marcheprime	
Nouvelle-Aquitaine	Gironde	Aire des Gargails		
Nouvelle-Aquitaine	Gironde	24 : Saint-Jean-d'Illac	Saucats, Saint-Jean-d'Illac, Cestas - (Jauge, Pierroton)	
Nouvelle-Aquitaine	Gironde	Aire de Bordeaux-Cestas		
Nouvelle-Aquitaine	Gironde	25 : Cestas	Cestas - centre, Canéjan	
Nouvelle-Aquitaine	Gironde	26b : Canéjan-Granet	Canéjan, Z. I. Canéjan-Granet	Exit and exit from Bordeaux
Nouvelle-Aquitaine	Gironde	26/26a : Gradignan	Canéjan, Z. I. Canéjan-Granet, Z. I. Pessac, Gradignan.	
Nouvelle-Aquitaine	Gironde	A630 - A63	Rocade Extérieure : Toulouse (A62), Paris (A10), Lyon (A89), Bordeaux, Talence	
Nouvelle-Aquitaine	Gironde	A630 - A63	Rocade Intérieure : Pessac, Mérignac	
1.000 mi = 1.609 km; 1.000 km = 0.621 mi

== List of exits and junctions ==
Region	Department	km	mi	Junction	Destinations	Notes
Nouvelle-Aquitaine	Gironde	5	3.10	1 : Mios	Biscarosse, Mios - Lancanau-de-Mios	
Nouvelle-Aquitaine	Gironde	9.5	5.90	2 : Facture-Biganos	Biganos, Cap Ferret, Mios	
Nouvelle-Aquitaine	Gironde	15.2	9.44	3 : Le Teich	Le Teich, Réserve Ornithologique	
Nouvelle-Aquitaine	Gironde	18.7	11.6	4 : Gujan - Césarée	Gujan-Mestras - centre, Ports Ostericoles, Actipôle	
Nouvelle-Aquitaine	Gironde	21.3	13.23	5 : Gujan - La Hume	Gujan-Mestras, Biscarosse, Sanguinet, Parcs d'attraction	
A 660 becomes N 250
1.000 mi = 1.609 km; 1.000 km = 0.621 mi

== Future ==
- The southern section will be widened to three lanes over the next few years.
- The northern section would become part of a new ring road for Bordeaux. This however is a controversial road project.
