= Azor (disambiguation) =

Azor is a city in Israel. Azor may also refer to:

- Azor (given name)
- Azor (surname)
- Azor, small town in the Tel Aviv District of Israel
- Azor (biblical figure) (died 372 BC), an ancestor of Jesus from the tribe of Judah.
- Azor (landowner), an 11th-century landowner
- Azor (horse) (foaled 1814), a British Thoroughbred racehorse
- The trade name of the following pharmaceutical drugs:
  - Olmesartan/amlodipine (in the US)
  - Alprazolam (in South Africa)
- azor, another name for a goshawk bird
- Azor (film), an Argentine–French–Swiss drama

== See also ==
- Asor
- Azores
- Azur (disambiguation)
- Azure (disambiguation)
- Hazor (disambiguation)
