= Côte d'Argent =

Atlantic coast of Aquitaine, France

Coordinates: 44°35′N 1°15′W

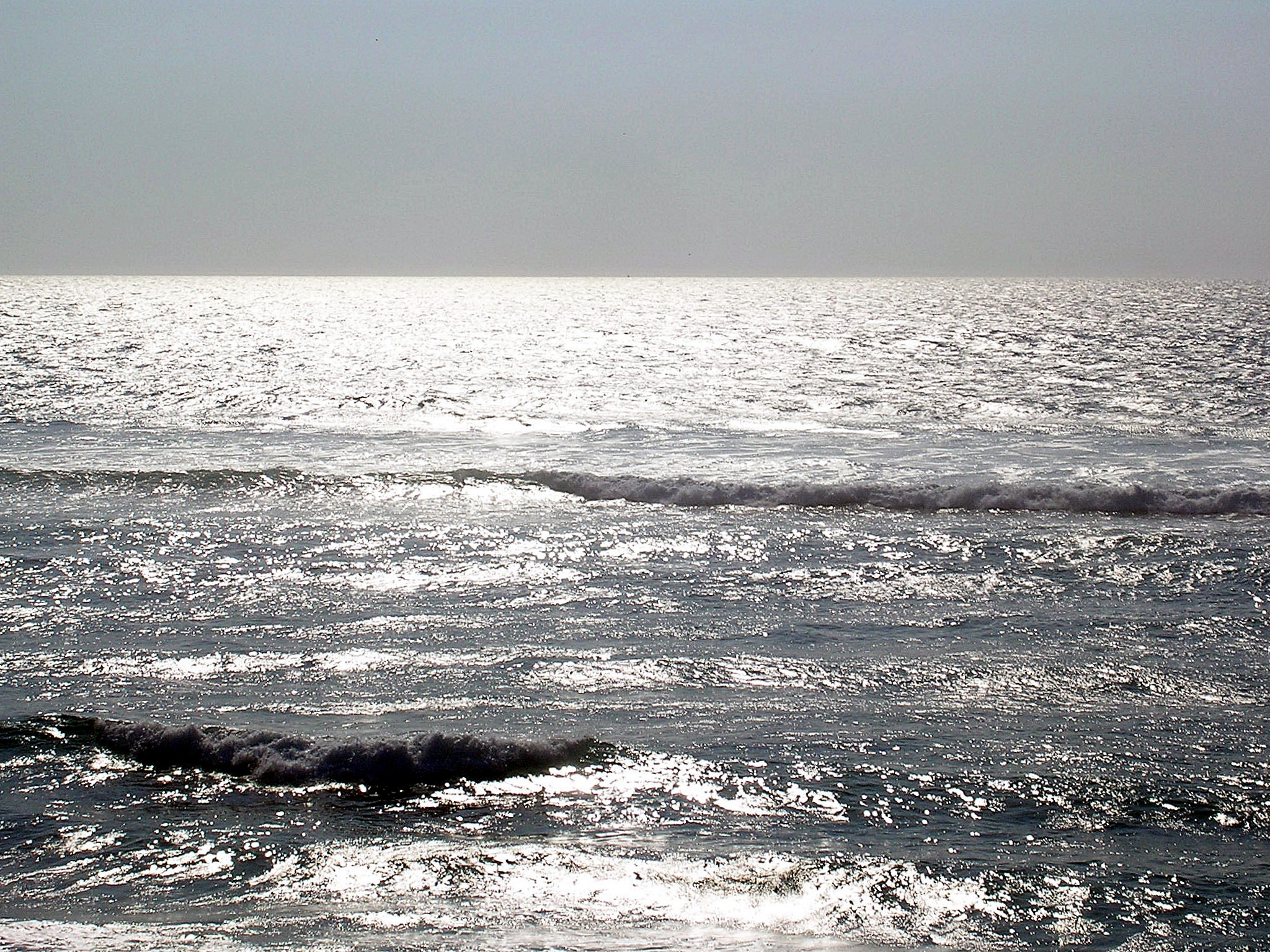
Silver-like water surface at Mimizan

The Côte d'Argent (French: [kot d‿aʁʒɑ̃]; lit. 'Silver Coast') is a name given to part of the Atlantic coast of the Aquitaine region in France. It runs from Soulac-sur-Mer in the north to Anglet in the south.

== Etymology ==
The term was first coined to describe the Aquitaine coast in 1905 by the journalist and poet Maurice Martin. The Congrès national des sociétés de géographie officially approved the name in 1907. The region it referred to eventually shrunk; the northern part including Royan became the Côte de Beauté and the southern part including Anglet became the Basque Coast.

== Geography ==
In the south-west of France, facing the Atlantic Ocean, La Côte d’Argent is part of the Bay of Biscay. It is limited at its north by the Gironde mouth and at its south by the river Adour. Large waves make this a popular surfing destination and create some of the largest sand dunes in Europe, including the Dune of Pilat. Surfing competitions include the Quiksilver Pro France and the Lacanau Pro.

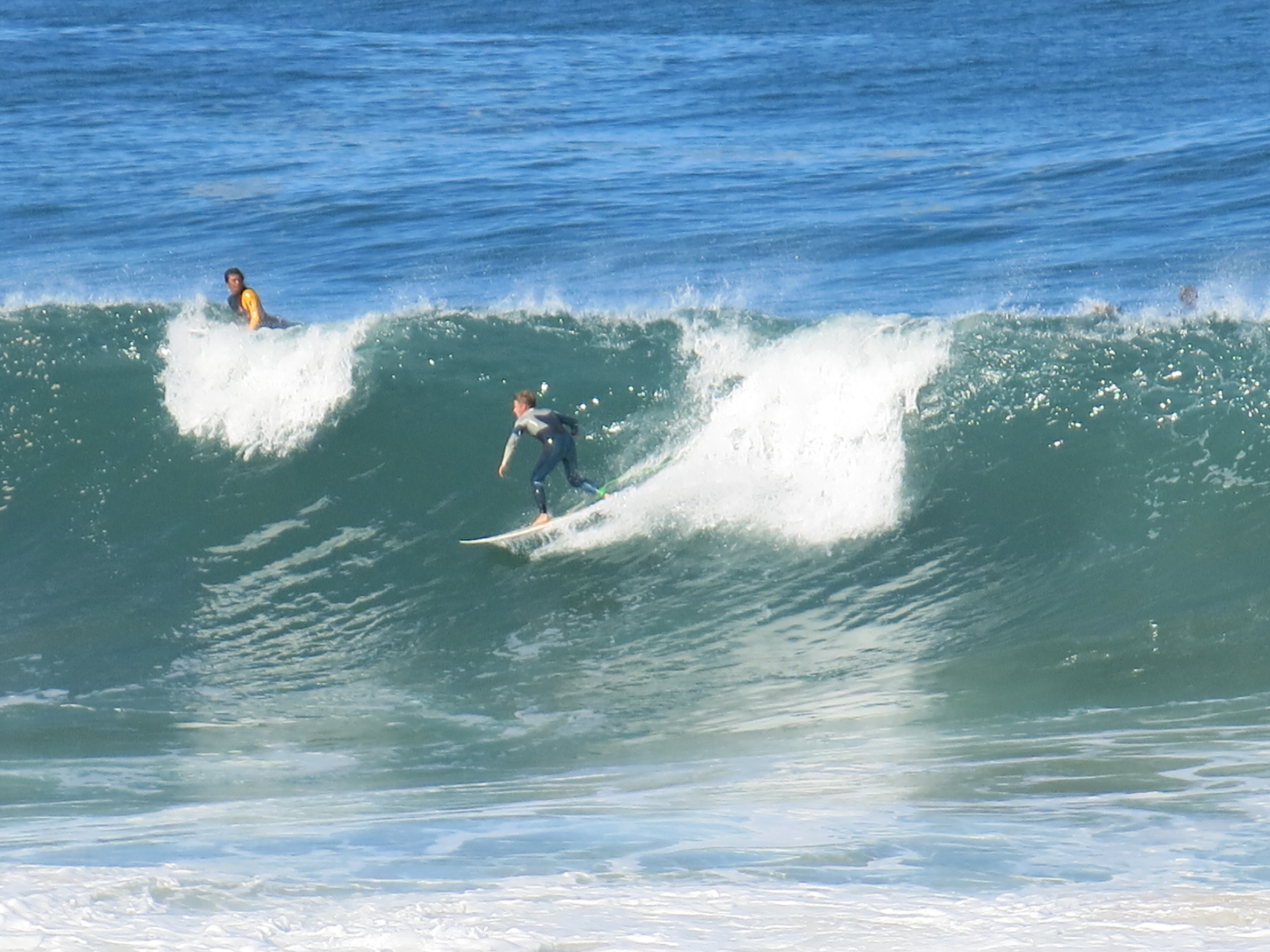
Surfing in Capbreton

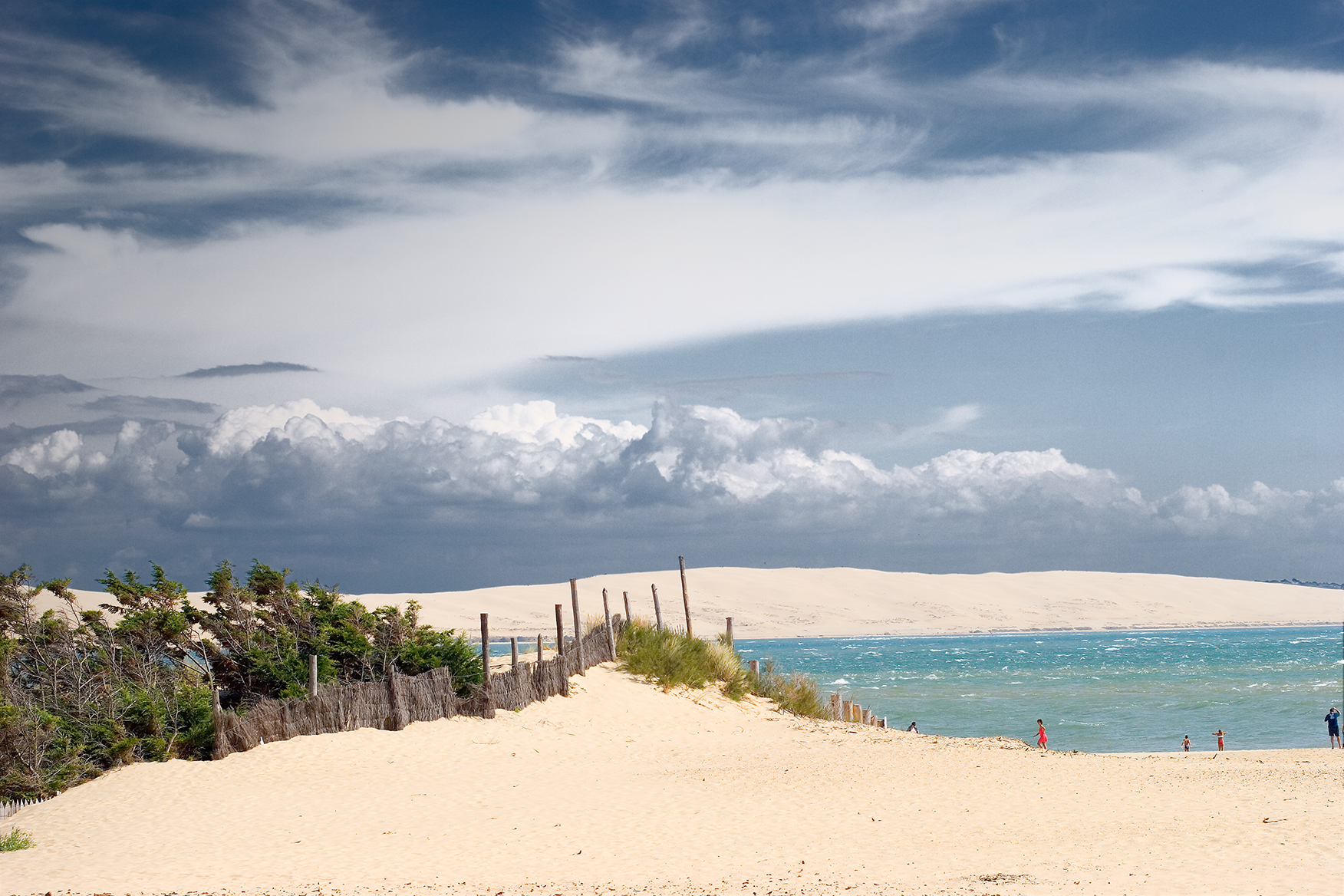
Dune of Pilat from Cap Ferret

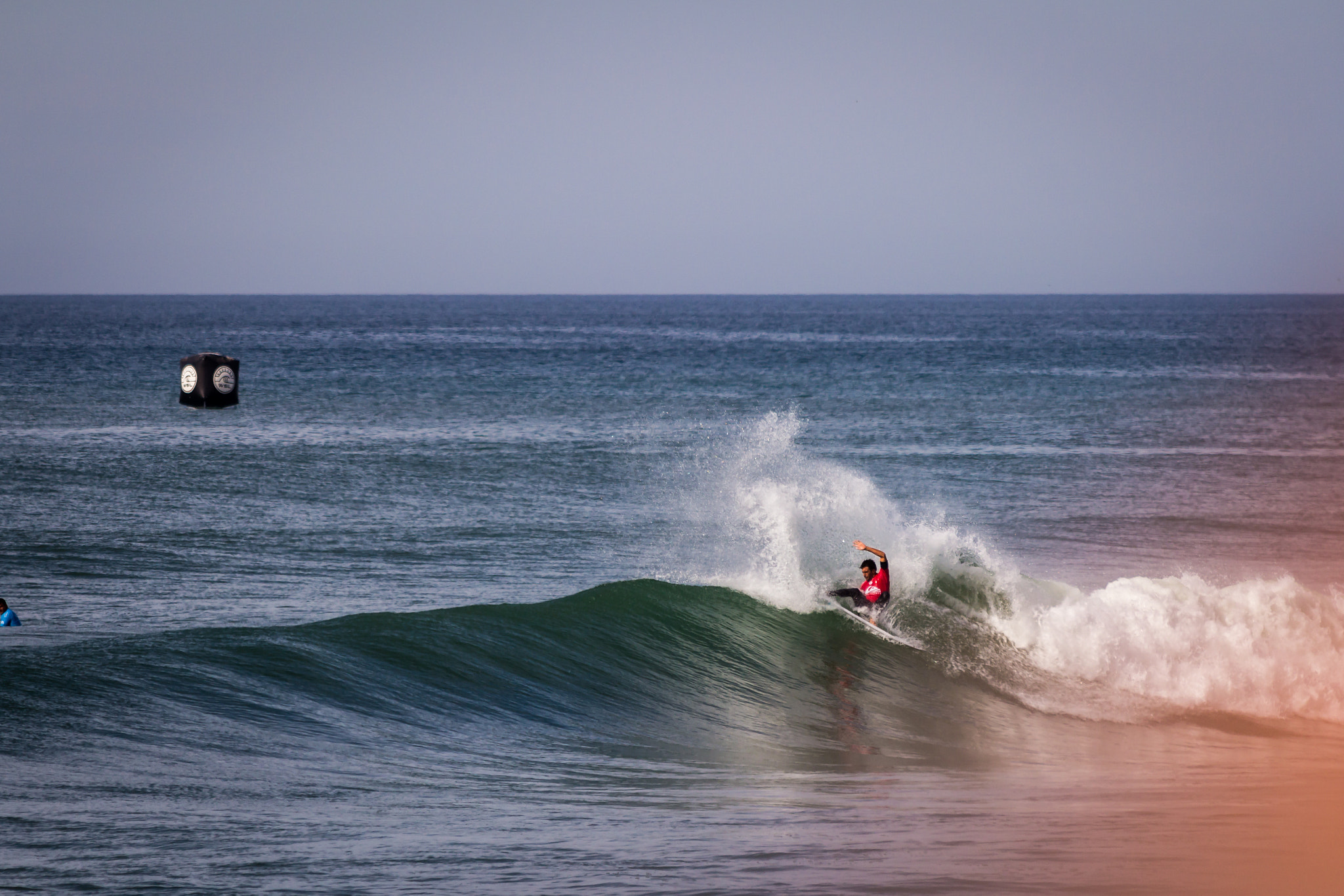
Quiksilver Pro France

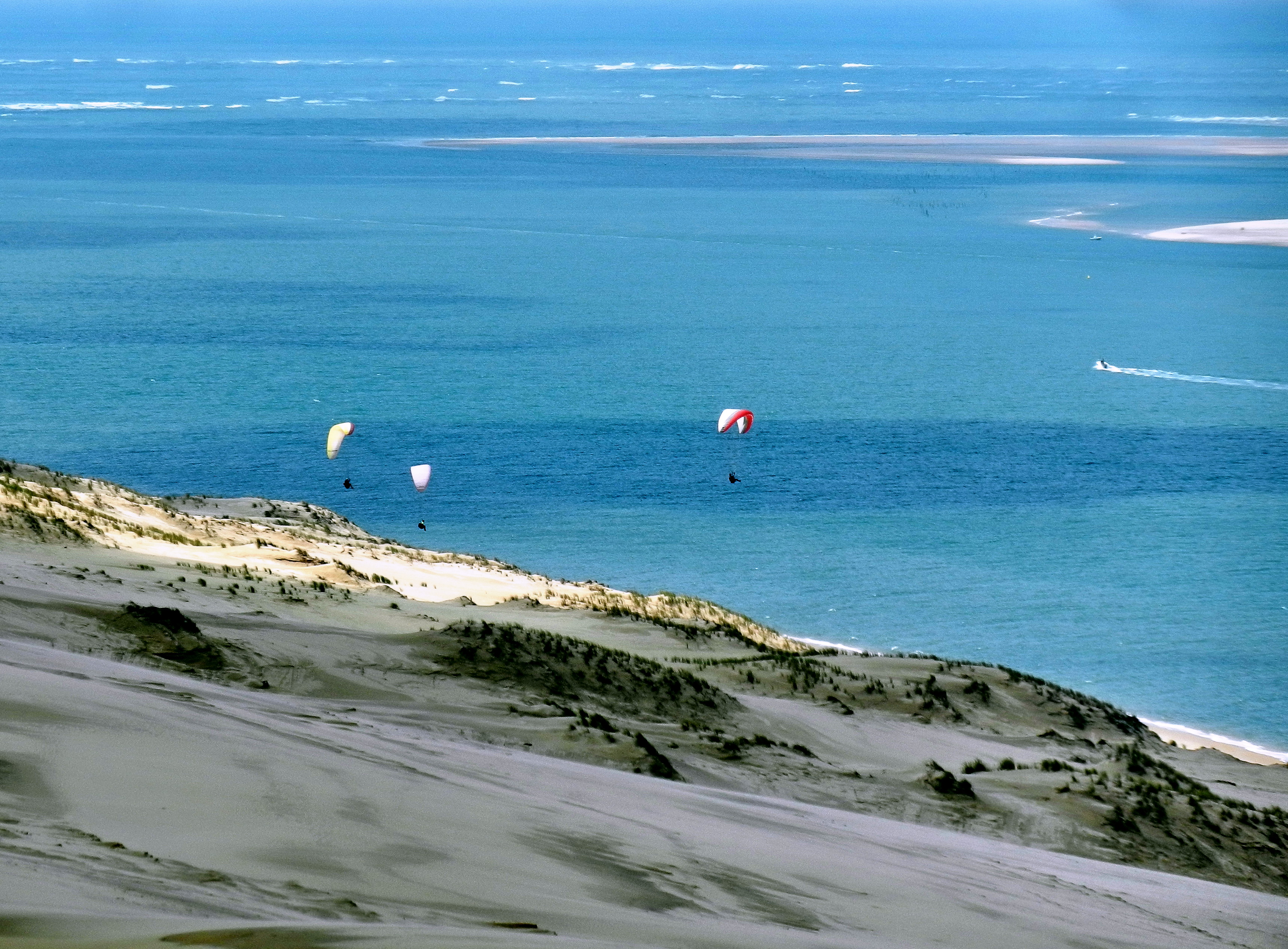
View from Dune of Pilat

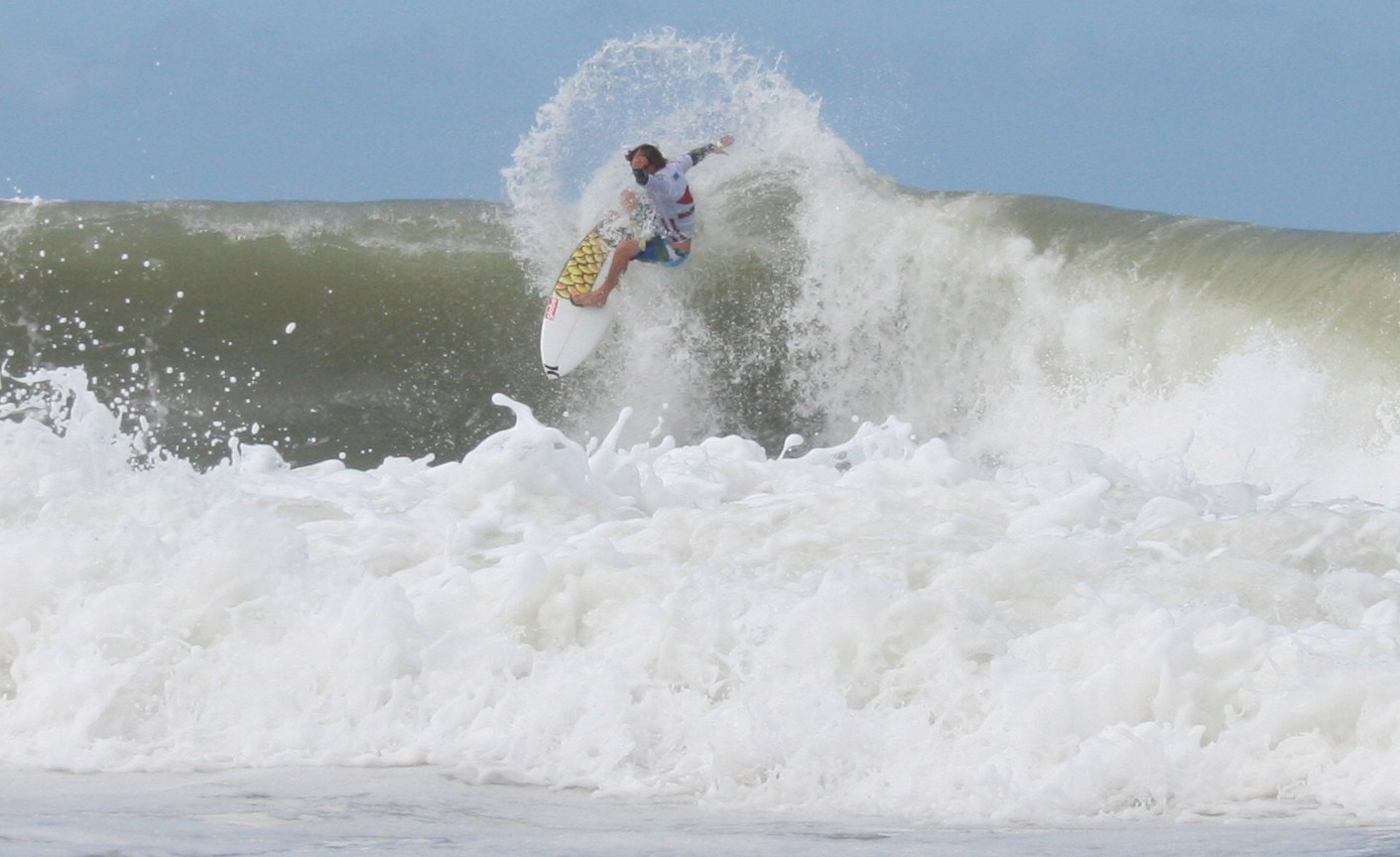
Lacanau Pro

== Towns ==
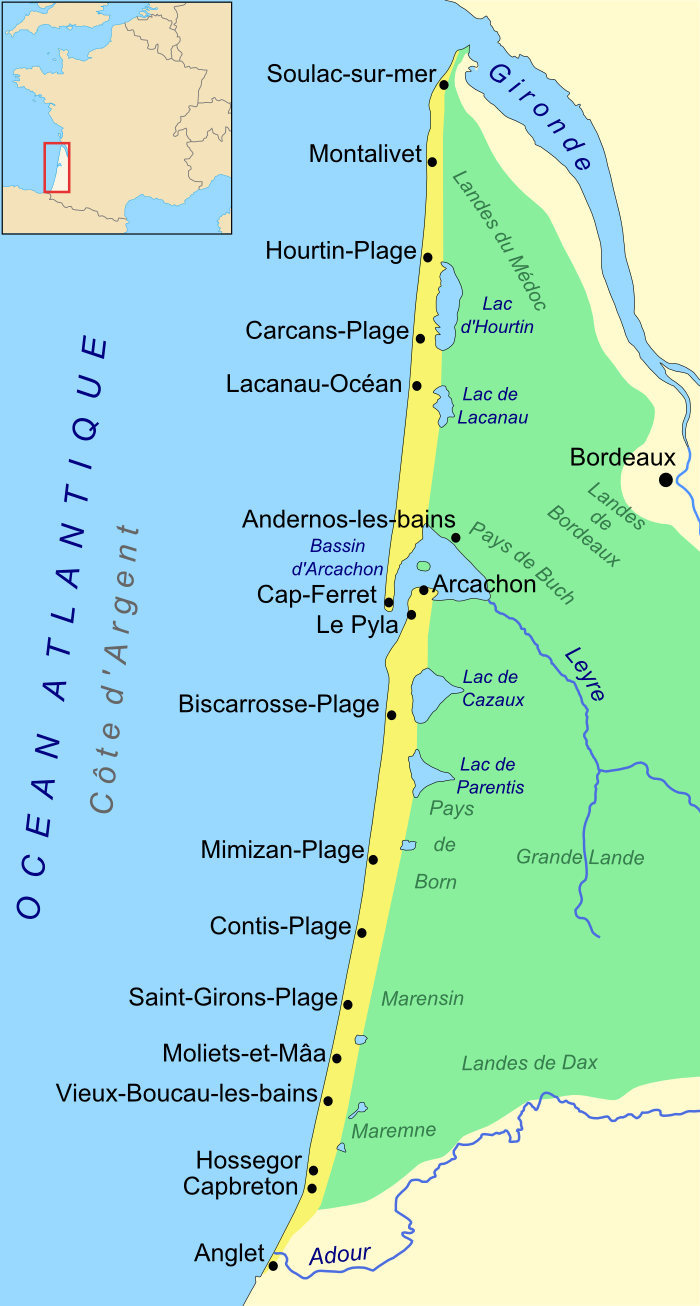
Map of the Côte d’Argent

Towns and resorts along the Côte d’Argent include:

=== Gironde ===
- Soulac-sur-Mer
- Vendays-Montalivet
- Hourtin
- Carcans
- Lacanau
- Le Porge
- Lège-Cap-Ferret
- Arcachon
- Pyla-sur-Mer

=== Landes ===
- Biscarrosse
- Mimizan, nicknamed the "Pearl of the Côte d’Argent"
- Contis
- Lit-et-Mixe
- Vielle-Saint-Girons
- Moliets-et-Maa
- Messanges
- Vieux-Boucau-les-Bains
- Seignosse
- Soorts-Hossegor
- Capbreton
- Labenne
- Ondres
- Tarnos

=== Pyrénées-Atlantiques ===
- Anglet

== See also ==
- Arcachon Bay
- The Great Dune of Pyla
