= Rowborough Manor =

Manor house in Isle of Wight, United Kingdom

Rowborough Manor (also Rodeberge, 11th century; Rowberg, 13th century; Rotirburgh, 14th century; Rowbarho, 16th century) is a manor house in the parish of Brading on the Isle of Wight.

== History ==
Rowborough lies between Hardingshute Manor and Hill Manor. From the fact that it was held of the Confessor by the Abbot of St. Swithun's, Winchester, as an alod it may be inferred that it was included in the 50 hides at Brading reputed to have been granted to the monastery by Ine king of the West Saxons. In 1086, it was in the possession of William son of Azor. The overlordship followed the same descent as Yaverland to the Russells, John Rivers (de Riperiis) being their tenant at the end of the 13th century. The estate afterwards came to Ralph de Olne, but had lapsed before 1346 to the overlords, the Russells, and subsequently followed the same descent as Yaverland until 1846. It was then sold with the other estates of the Wright family, the purchaser being Sir William Oglander. As of 1912, the manor was owned by Mr. J. H. Oglander.

The current main property has been dated to 1720, with extensions in 1830s and 1986, and is currently in use as private family accommodation.
