= Azure =

Azure may refer to:

== Color ==
- Azure (color), a hue of blue
  - Azure (heraldry)
  - Shades of azure, shades and variations

== Arts and media ==
- Azure (Art Farmer and Fritz Pauer album), 1987
- Azure (Gary Peacock and Marilyn Crispell album), 2013
- Azure (design magazine), Toronto, Ontario
- Azure (heraldry), a blue tincture on flags or coats of arms
- Azure (magazine), a periodical on Jewish thought and identity
- Azure (painting), by Gustave Van de Woestijne
- "Azure" (song), by Duke Ellington
- "Azure", a song by The Third and the Mortal from the album Painting on Glass
- "Azure", a 2007 single by Slam also featured on the album Human Response
- "Azure Azure", a song by Tim Hecker from the album Radio Amor

== Computing ==
- Microsoft Azure, a cloud computing platform
- Mozilla Azure, a graphics abstraction API

== Places ==
- Azure, Alberta, a locality in Canada
- Azure, Montana, a census-designated place in the United States
- Azure Window, a former natural arch in Malta
- Azure Swimming Pool, one of the indoor swimming pools in the abandoned city of Pripyat, Ukraine, which was affected by the 1986 Chernobyl nuclear disaster

== Other uses ==
- Azure Ryder (born 1996), Australian singer, songwriter, and musician
- Azure (barley), a malting barley variety
- Bentley Azure, a car

== See also ==
- Lapis lazuli, a semi-precious stone, and the root of the word "azure"
- Azur (disambiguation)
- Azura (disambiguation)
- Azura (given name)
- Azure (name), the given name and surname
- Azzurra (given name)
