= Azor (given name) =

Azor is a masculine given name that may refer to the following notable people:

- Azor (biblical figure) (died 372 BC), an ancestor of Jesus from the tribe of Judah
- Azor (landowner), one of the most powerful English landowners in the 11th century
- Azor Adelaide (1922–1971), Mauritian Creole political activist
- Azor Betts (1740–1809), American Loyalist doctor
- Azor Matusiwa (born 1998), Dutch football midfielder
- Azor Orne (1731–1796), colonial American merchant and politician
- Azor Taber (1798–1858), American politician
- Azor Warner Van Hoose (1860–1921), American educator
- John Azor Kellogg (1828–1883), American politician and Union Army officer
