= Azura =

Azura may refer to:

== Entertainment ==
- Azura (Elder Scrolls), a fictional supernatural entity in The Elder Scrolls video games
- "Azura", song on the album Don Solaris by 808 State
- Azura, the alias of character Romwell Jr in the Gorgeous Carat manga
- Azura, a character in the Di-Gata Defenders television series
- Azura, a fictional island fortress in Gears of War 3
- Azura, the secondary main playable character from Fire Emblem Fates
- Azura, Queen of the Witch People, in the "Flash Gordon" franchise
- Thena, a character in the Marvel Comics universe, also known as Azura
- Azura, a character in the Barbie: Fairytopia franchise
- The Good Witch Azura, a book character in the Owl House universe
- Open-air amphitheater in Bonner Springs, Kansas (Kansas City metro), commonly known as Sandstone Amphitheater

== Other uses ==
- Azura (Hong Kong), an apartment building in Hong Kong
- Azura (religious figure), daughter of Adam and Eve
- Azura (wave power device)
- Azura, Numidia, a titular see in the Roman Catholic Church
- Azura Skye (born 1981), American actress
- Azura Thermal Power Station, a natural gas powered power station in Nigeria
- MS Azura, a cruise ship in the P&O Cruises fleet

== See also ==
- Azzurra, a yacht racing team
- Azur (disambiguation)
- Azure (disambiguation)
