= Azur =

Azur may refer to:

- Azur, Landes, France
- Azur (satellite), Germany's first scientific satellite
- Azur Air, a charter airline and former regional airline in Russia
- MPM-10, also known as 'Azur', rolling stock used in the Montreal Metro
- MS Royal Iris, formerly named MS Azur and MS The Azur
- Azor, Israel, also called "Azur"
- Azor (biblical figure), son of Eliakim, mentioned briefly in the Genealogy of Jesus in Matthew 1:13-14
- Azour, Lebanon

AZUR may refer to:

- Actions en zone urbaine (French for Urban Operations)

== See also ==
- Azor (disambiguation)
- Azura (disambiguation)
- Azure (disambiguation)
- French Riviera, also known as Côte d'Azur (Azure Coast)
