= Blackpan Manor =

- Former names: Bochepon
- Alternative names: Blakepenne

General information
- Type: Manor house
- Location: Brading, United Kingdom

Blackpan Manor (also Bochepon, 11th century; Blakepenne, 13th century) is a manor house in the parish of Brading on the Isle of Wight.

== History ==
Blackpan is entered in Domesday as a small holding of 10 acres held by William son of Azor. It passed to the Lisles, with whom the overlordship remained until the 15th century. Of them it was held at the end of the 13th century by John Fleming, whose widow Hawise held it early in the next century. In 1346 Thomas le Vavasour and Elizabeth de Lisle held this half fee in succession to Hawise Fleming. Before 1428 the manor had been divided between three holders, John Lisle, John Stower and Thomas Middlemarch. It reverted before 1460 to the overlords the Lisles of Wootton, and followed the descent of Shanklin (q.v.) until 1894, when it passed to Miss White, sister of Francis White-Popham. It 1912 it belonged to Mrs. White-Popham, but Capt. Macpherson, R.N., was tenant for life.
