= Tosse =

- Commune
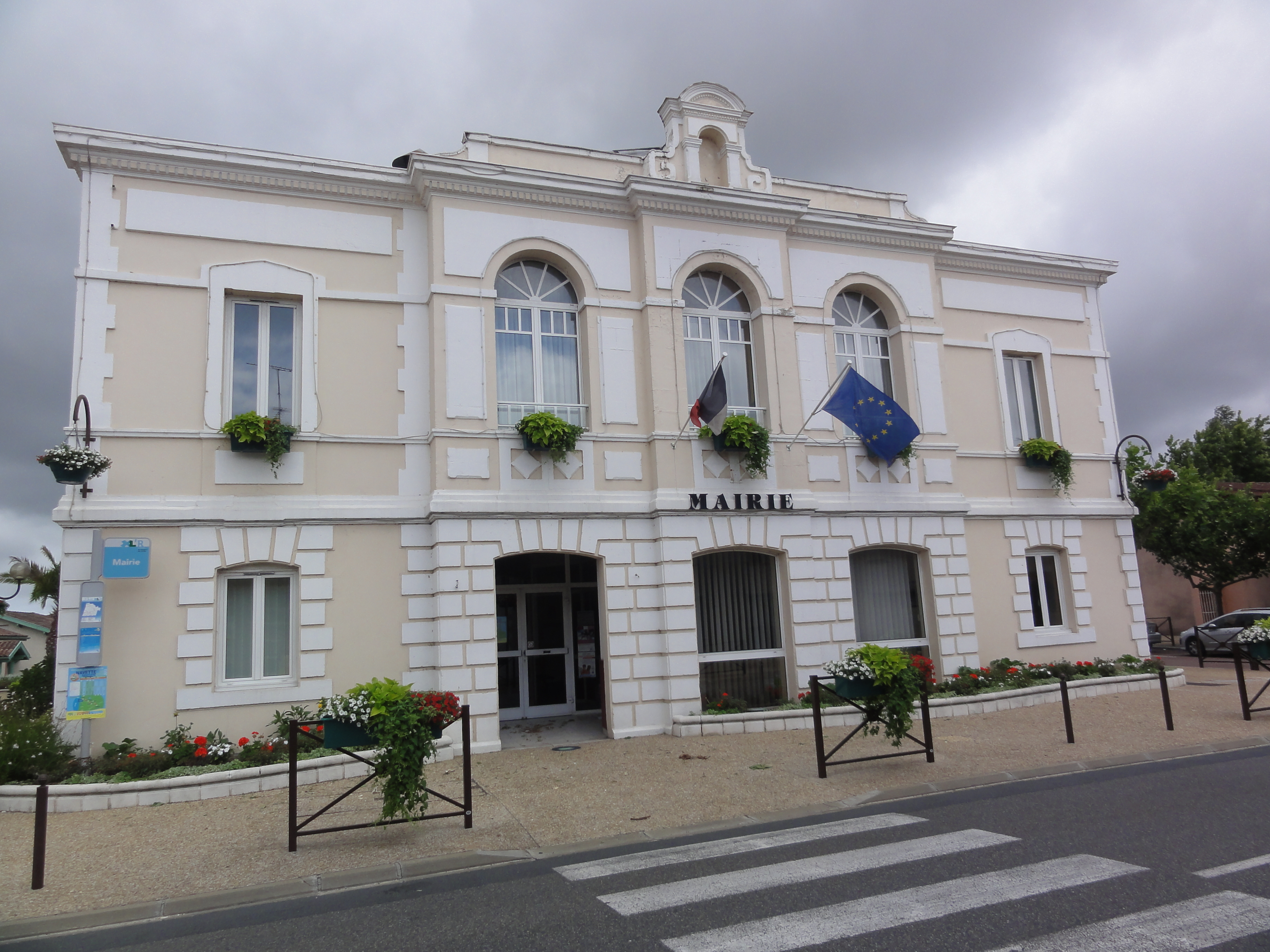
- Town hall
- Location of Tosse
- Location within France Location within Nouvelle-Aquitaine
- Coordinates: 43°41′24″N 1°19′55″W
- Country: France
- Region: Nouvelle-Aquitaine
- Department: Landes
- Arrondissement: Dax
- Canton: Marensin Sud
- Intercommunality: Maremne-Adour-Côte-Sud

Government
  - Mayor (2020–2026): Jean-Claude Daulouède
- Area^{1}: 17.94 km^{2} (6.93 sq mi)
- Elevation: 7 m (23 ft)
- Highest elevation: 54 m (177 ft)
- Lowest elevation: 12 m (39 ft)
- Population (2023): 3,556
  - Density: 198.2/km^{2} (513.4/sq mi)
- Time zone: UTC+01:00 (CET)
  - Summer (DST): UTC+02:00 (CEST)
- INSEE/Postal code: 40317 /40230
- ^{1} French Land Register data, which excludes lakes, ponds, glaciers > 1 km^{2} (0.386 sq mi or 247 acres) and river estuaries.

Tosse (French pronunciation: [tɔs]; Occitan: Tòssa) is a commune in the Landes department in Nouvelle-Aquitaine in southwestern France.

== Population ==
Historical population

Year	Pop.	±% p.a.
1793	525	—
1821	603	+0.50%
1846	723	+0.73%
1872	817	+0.47%
1901	992	+0.67%
1926	832	−0.70%
1946	760	−0.45%
1962	996	+1.70%
1968	1,027	+0.51%

Year	Pop.	±% p.a.
1975	1,163	+1.79%
1982	1,280	+1.38%
1990	1,307	+0.26%
1999	1,679	+2.82%
2007	2,142	+3.09%
2012	2,408	+2.37%
2017	2,927	+3.98%
2023	3,556	+3.30%

Source: EHESS and INSEE (1968-2023)

== See also ==
- Communes of the Landes department
