= Hill Manor =

Hill Manor is a manor house in the parish of Brading on the Isle of Wight.

A small holding held, with the adjoining Beaper, by the late Miss le Marchant, lies to the east of Hardingshute Manor, and was in the 14th century held by Reginald le Corner. It probably formed part of the manor of Nunwell at one time. In 1333 Walter le Burgeys de la Brigge granted a rent in Hill to John de Kingston, but this may refer to another holding. In 1604 Robert Dillington died seised of the 'manor of Hill.'
