= Angresse =

- Commune
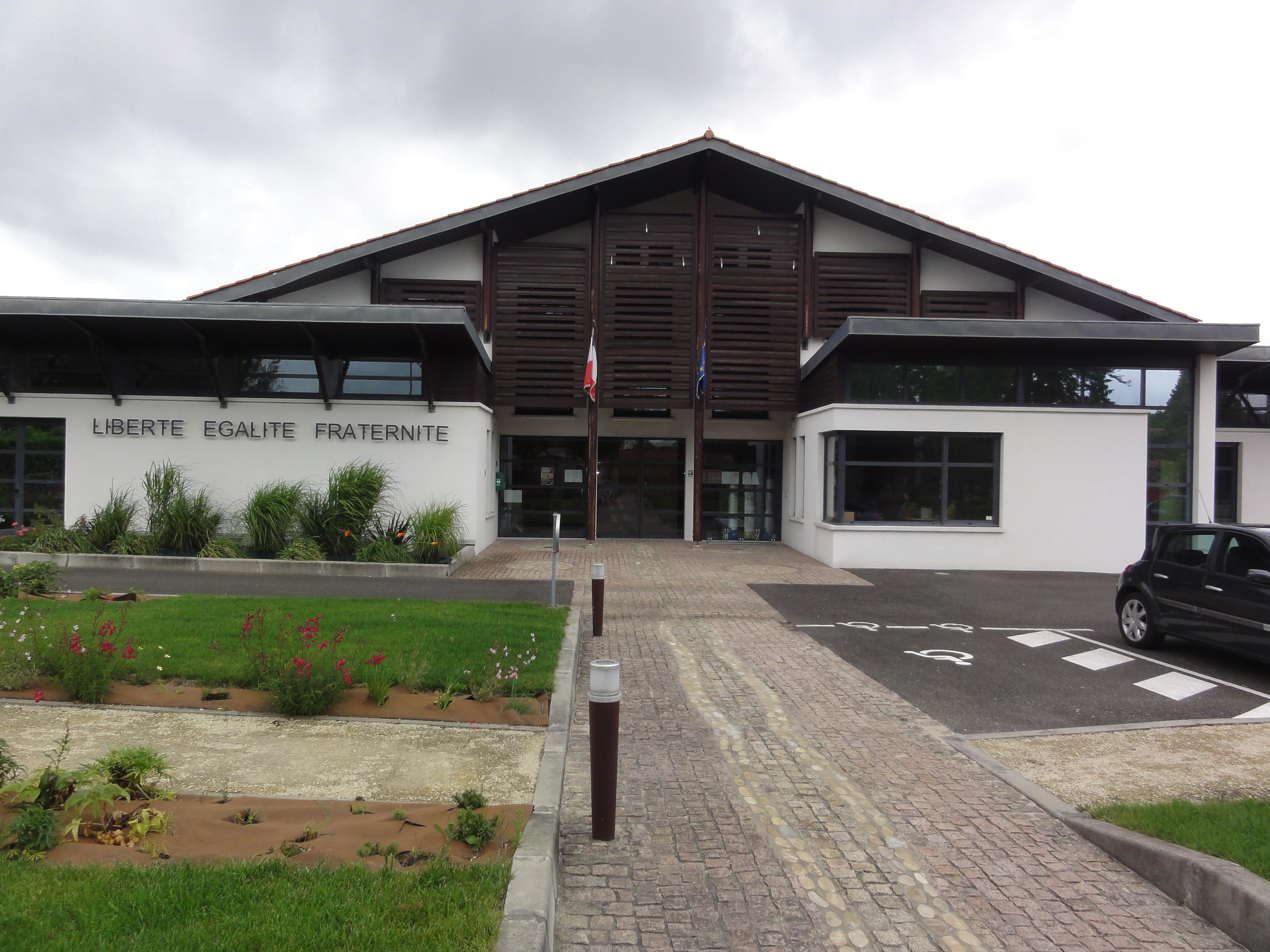
- Town hall
- Location of Angresse
- Location within France Location within Nouvelle-Aquitaine
- Coordinates: 43°39′36″N 1°22′16″W
- Country: France
- Region: Nouvelle-Aquitaine
- Department: Landes
- Arrondissement: Dax
- Canton: Marensin Sud
- Intercommunality: Maremne-Adour-Côte-Sud

Government
  - Mayor (2020–2026): Philippe Sardeluc
- Area^{1}: 7.68 km^{2} (2.97 sq mi)
- Elevation: 26 m (85 ft)
- Highest elevation: 21 m (69 ft)
- Lowest elevation: 2 m (6.6 ft)
- Population (2023): 2,277
  - Density: 296/km^{2} (768/sq mi)
- Time zone: UTC+01:00 (CET)
  - Summer (DST): UTC+02:00 (CEST)
- INSEE/Postal code: 40004 /40150
- ^{1} French Land Register data, which excludes lakes, ponds, glaciers > 1 km^{2} (0.386 sq mi or 247 acres) and river estuaries.

Angresse (French pronunciation: [ɑ̃ɡʁɛs]; Occitan: Angressa) is a commune of the Landes department in Nouvelle-Aquitaine in southwestern France.

== Population ==
Historical population
| Year | Pop. | ±% p.a. |
|---|---|---|
| 1968 | 388 | — |
| 1975 | 492 | +3.45% |
| 1982 | 653 | +4.13% |
| 1990 | 877 | +3.76% |
| 1999 | 1,097 | +2.52% |
| 2007 | 1,383 | +2.94% |
| 2012 | 1,745 | +4.76% |
| 2017 | 2,003 | +2.80% |
| 2023 | 2,277 | +2.16% |
Source: INSEE

== Notable residents ==
- Jessika Ponchet (born 1996) professional tennis player.

== See also ==
- Communes of the Landes department
