= Canton of Marensin Sud =

Canton of France

Coordinates: 43.75°N 1.33°W

The canton of Marensin Sud is an administrative division of the Landes department, southwestern France. It was created at the French canton reorganisation which came into effect in March 2015. Its seat is in Soustons.

It consists of the following communes:

1. Angresse
2. Azur
3. Magescq
4. Messanges
5. Moliets-et-Maa
6. Saint-Geours-de-Maremne
7. Saubusse
8. Seignosse
9. Soorts-Hossegor
10. Soustons
11. Tosse
12. Vieux-Boucau-les-Bains
