= Azura (Hong Kong) =

Building in Mid-Levels, Hong Kong

Coordinates: 22°16′55.5″N 114°08′59.1″E

AZURA
- 蔚然
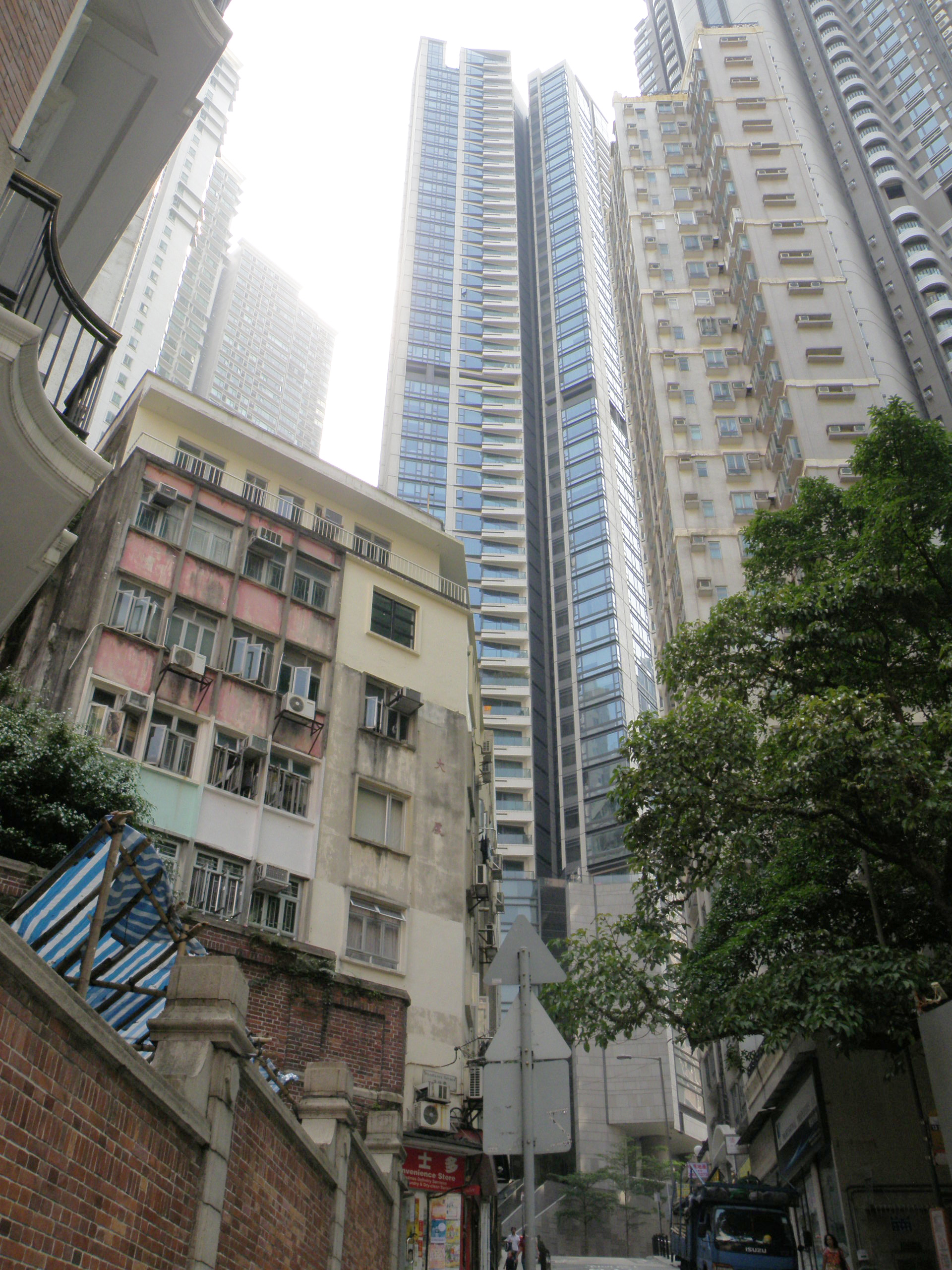
- Interactive map of the AZURA area

General information
- Status: Completed
- Type: residential
- Architectural style: modern
- Location: 2A Seymour Road, Mid-Levels West, Hong Kong
- Completed: 2012
- Owner: Swire Properties

Height
- Height: 177 metres (581 ft)

Technical details
- Floor count: 50
- Lifts/elevators: 4

Design and construction
- Architecture firm: Dennis Lau & Ng Chun Man Architects & Engineers (HK) Limited
- Main contractor: China Overseas Building Construction Limited

Other information
- Number of units: 126

Website
- http://www.azura.com.hk/

Azura
- Traditional Chinese: 蔚然
Transcriptions
Yue: Cantonese
- Yale Romanization: Wai yìhn
- Jyutping: Wai^{3} jin^{4}

Azura, stylised as AZURA, is a 177-metre-tall residential skyscraper in the Mid-Levels West area of Central and Western District on Hong Kong Island. There are 50 floors with 126 apartments in total. Each floor consists of three units, ranging in size from 153 m^{2} (1,650 sq ft) to 195 m^{2} (2,100 sq ft), containing three or four bedrooms. The building was completed and occupied in the fourth quarter of 2012.

== See also ==
- List of tallest buildings in Hong Kong
