= Magescq =

- Commune
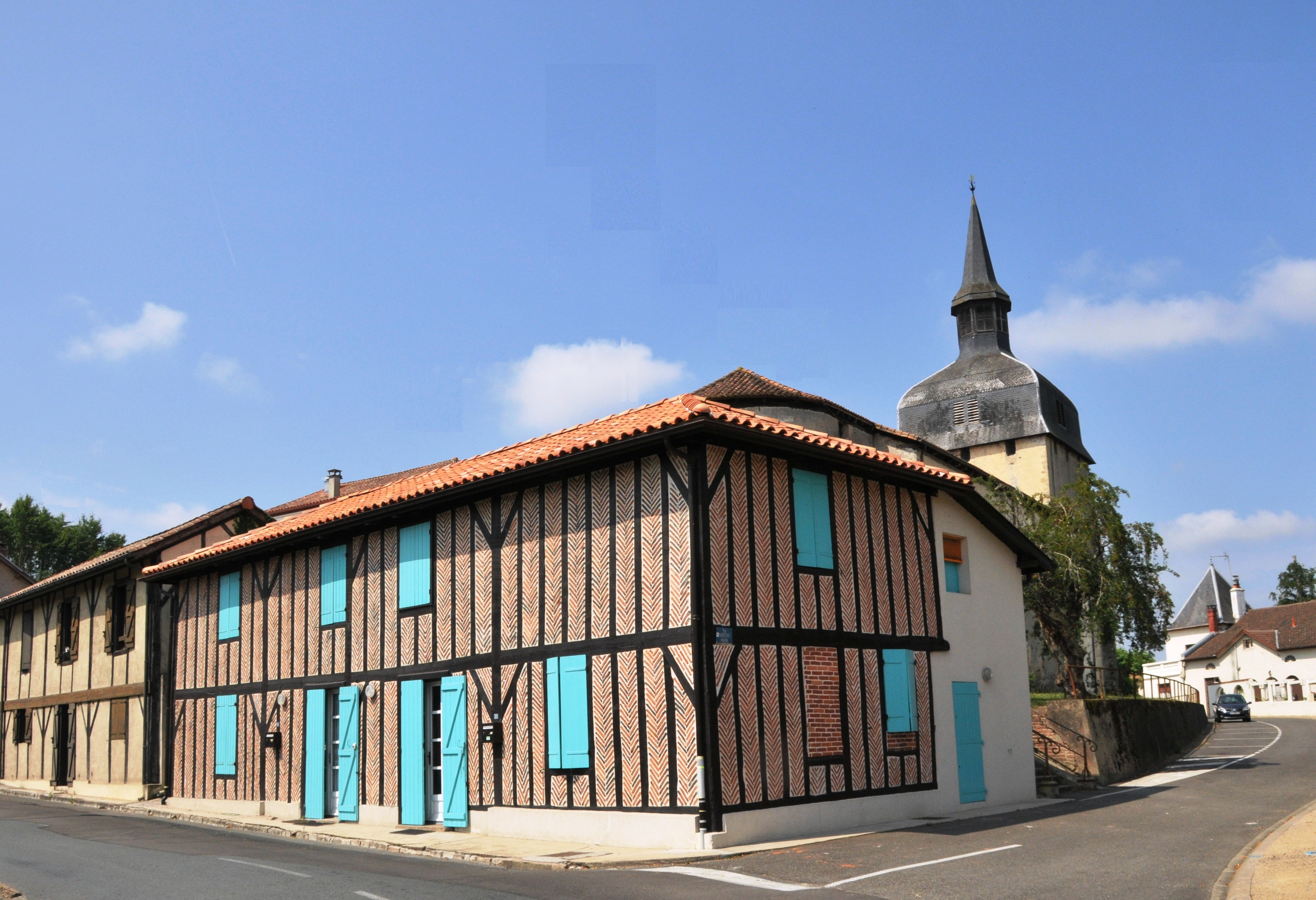
- A timbered building and the church tower in Magescq

- Coat of arms
- Location of Magescq
- Location within France Location within Nouvelle-Aquitaine
- Coordinates: 43°46′49″N 1°12′57″W
- Country: France
- Region: Nouvelle-Aquitaine
- Department: Landes
- Arrondissement: Dax
- Canton: Marensin Sud
- Intercommunality: Maremne-Adour-Côte-Sud

Government
  - Mayor (2020–2026): Alain Soumat
- Area^{1}: 77.12 km^{2} (29.78 sq mi)
- Elevation: 22 m (72 ft)
- Highest elevation: 66 m (217 ft)
- Lowest elevation: 9 m (30 ft)
- Population (2023): 2,698
  - Density: 34.98/km^{2} (90.61/sq mi)
- Time zone: UTC+01:00 (CET)
  - Summer (DST): UTC+02:00 (CEST)
- INSEE/Postal code: 40168 /40140
- ^{1} French Land Register data, which excludes lakes, ponds, glaciers > 1 km^{2} (0.386 sq mi or 247 acres) and river estuaries.

Magescq (French pronunciation: [maʒɛsk]; Occitan: Magesc) is a commune in the Landes department in Nouvelle-Aquitaine in south-western France.

== Population ==
Historical population
Year	Pop.	±% p.a.
1968	1,109	—
1975	1,111	+0.03%
1982	1,149	+0.48%
1990	1,218	+0.73%
1999	1,378	+1.38%
2007	1,653	+2.30%
2012	1,935	+3.20%
2017	2,175	+2.37%
2023	2,698	+3.66%
Source: INSEE

== See also ==
- Communes of the Landes department
