= Saint-Geours-de-Maremne =

- Commune
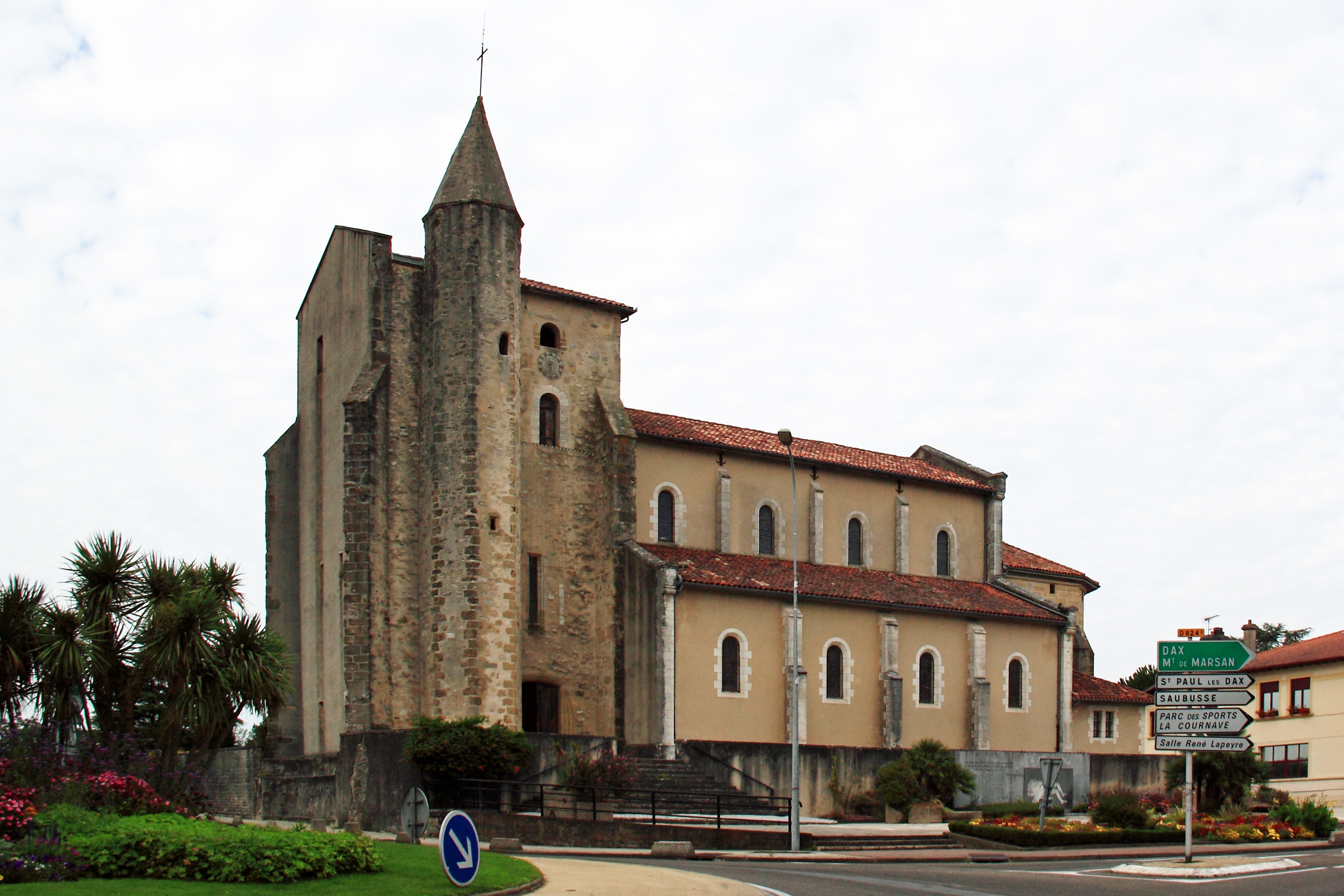
- Location of Saint-Geours-de-Maremne
- Location within France Location within Nouvelle-Aquitaine
- Coordinates: 43°41′17″N 1°13′41″W
- Country: France
- Region: Nouvelle-Aquitaine
- Department: Landes
- Arrondissement: Dax
- Canton: Marensin Sud
- Intercommunality: Maremne-Adour-Côte-Sud

Government
  - Mayor (2020–2026): Mathieu Diriberry
- Area^{1}: 42.9 km^{2} (16.6 sq mi)
- Elevation: 24 m (79 ft)
- Highest elevation: 66 m (217 ft)
- Lowest elevation: 1 m (3.3 ft)
- Population (2023): 3,089
  - Density: 72.0/km^{2} (186/sq mi)
- Time zone: UTC+01:00 (CET)
  - Summer (DST): UTC+02:00 (CEST)
- INSEE/Postal code: 40261 /40230
- ^{1} French Land Register data, which excludes lakes, ponds, glaciers > 1 km^{2} (0.386 sq mi or 247 acres) and river estuaries.

Saint-Geours-de-Maremne (French pronunciation: [sɛ̃ ʒuʁ də maʁɛn]; Occitan: Sent Jors de Maremne) is a commune in the Landes department in Nouvelle-Aquitaine in southwestern France.

== Population ==
Historical population

Year	Pop.	±% p.a.
1793	913	—
1821	1,200	+0.98%
1846	1,554	+1.04%
1872	1,609	+0.13%
1901	1,524	−0.19%
1926	1,274	−0.71%
1946	1,181	−0.38%
1962	1,194	+0.07%
1968	1,237	+0.59%

Year	Pop.	±% p.a.
1975	1,254	+0.20%
1982	1,234	−0.23%
1990	1,434	+1.90%
1999	1,666	+1.68%
2007	1,986	+2.22%
2012	2,376	+3.65%
2017	2,673	+2.38%
2023	3,089	+2.44%

Source: EHESS and INSEE (1968-2023)

== See also ==
- Communes of the Landes department
