= Azor Betts =

American physician (1740–1809)

- Born: September 13, 1740; Norwalk, Connecticut
- Died: September 14, 1809 (aged 69); Digby, Nova Scotia
- Known for: Smallpox vaccine
- Scientific career
- Fields: Medicine

Azor Betts (September 13, 1740 – September 14, 1809) was an American Loyalist medical doctor who began his practice in the Province of New York before the American Revolutionary War. His staunch defense of smallpox inoculation and support of the Loyalist cause led to his arrest and eventual departure to Canada.

== Life before the Revolution ==
Azor Betts was born on September 13, 1740, in Norwalk, Connecticut, the son of Nathan Betts and Mary Belden. He married Gloriana Purdy in 1765 in Rye, New York, and practiced medicine in New York City prior to the Revolutionary War.

== The Revolution and smallpox ==
The events of 1776 that began open hostility between the Continental Army and the British Army in America were tempered by outbreaks of smallpox that began the year previous. General George Washington of the Continentals ordered on May 20, 1776, that no man in his army be inoculated with smallpox, or face serious punishment. Betts first administered smallpox to members of the Continental Army mere days after the order was given, and was placed under arrest by local authorities. Testimony during a hearing on the matter before the New York Committee of Safety on May 26, 1776, was given by both Doctor Foster representing the prosecution and Betts in his defense. Doctor Foster testified that:

...information was given to General Putnam, that several persons had been inoculated, at the house of one Fisher, in Stone Street, contrary to a resolve of the Provincial Congress of this Colony, he the examinant (agreeable to General Putnam's order) immediately went to the house of the above mentioned Fisher, where he discovered Lt. Colonel Moulton, Capt. Parks, Doctor Hart, and Lieutenant Brown had been inoculated by Doctor Azor Betts.

In his defense, Betts told the Committee that:

he had been repeatedly applied to by the officers of the Continental Army to inoculate them, that he refused, but being overpersuaded he at last inoculated the persons above mentioned.

As a reaction to the news that Betts had performed these inoculations in New York, Washington, immediately drew up another order, this time spelling out the punishment for any soldier caught being inoculated with smallpox:

The General presents his Compliments to the Honorable The Provincial Congress, and General Committee, is much obliged to them, for their Care, in endeavoring to prevent the spreading of the Small-pox (by Inoculation or any other way) in this City, or in the Continental Army, which might prove fatal to the army, if allowed of, at this critical time, when there is reason to expect thay may soon be called to action; and orders that the Officers take the strictest care, to examine into the state of their respective Corps, and thereby prevent Inoculation amongst them; which, if any Soldier should presume upon, he must expect the severst punishment.

Any Officer in the Continental Army, who shall suffer himself to be inoculated, will be cashiered and turned out of the army, and have his name published in the News papers throughout the Continent, as an Enemy and Traitor to his Country.

Upon the first appearance of any eruption, the Officer discovering of it in any Soldiers, is to give information to the Regimental Surgeon, and the Surgeon make report of the same, to the Director General of the hospital.

Jailed again for more smallpox inoculations, Betts became an open Loyalist, serving as both a Captain-Lieutenant in the Kings American Regiment and also as a surgeon for the Queen's Rangers. In May 1783, Betts left America for good, making his home in Kingston, New Brunswick.

== Life in Canada ==
Soon after arriving in Kingston, Betts created isolation wards for those infected with smallpox. He continued this practice, and when the smallpox vaccine was introduced in 1802, he vaccinated local citizens free of charge.

Betts died of consumption in Digby, Nova Scotia, in 1809, one day after his 69th birthday. He is buried in the cemetery of the Trinity Anglican Church there.

The inscription on a tombstone erected and later renewed by his family cites a different date for his death and burial place. A grave stone at the Old Loyalist Burial Grounds in Saint John, New Brunswick, is inscribed "In Memory of Dr Azor Betts Died Sept 15, 1811, aged 72 years. Also his wife Gloriannah, died March 16, 1815, aged 68 years."

== See also ==
- Vaccine
- Vaccination
- Inoculation
- History of science
