= Azura (given name) =

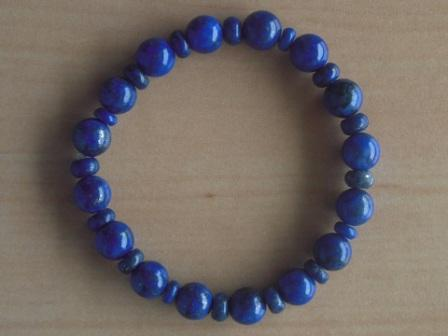
- A bracelet made of lapis lazuli. The name Azura is ultimately derived from a Persian word for the blue stone.
- Gender: Female
- Language: English

Origin
- Meaning: Blue

Other names
- Related names: Azure, Azzurra

Azura is a feminine given name meaning "blue", derived from a Persian word meaning "blue semiprecious stone" or lapis lazuli.

Notable people with the name include:

- Azurá Stevens (born 1996), American professional basketball player
- Azura Skye, stage name of American actress Azura Storozynski (born 1981)
