= Moliets-et-Maa =

- Commune
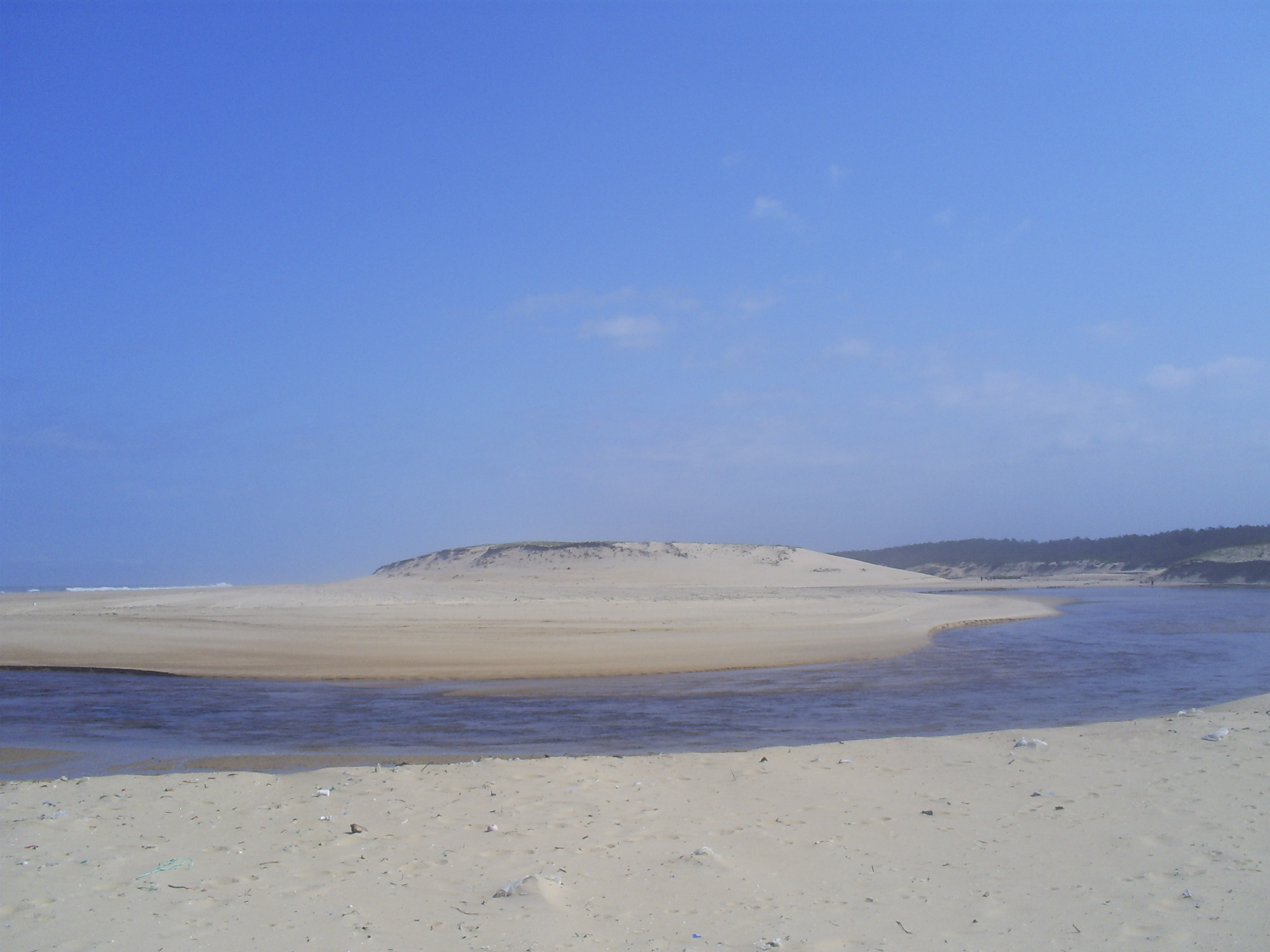
- The beach at Moliets-et-Mâa

- Coat of arms
- Location of Moliets-et-Maa
- Location within France Location within Nouvelle-Aquitaine
- Coordinates: 43°51′00″N 1°21′25″W
- Country: France
- Region: Nouvelle-Aquitaine
- Department: Landes
- Arrondissement: Dax
- Canton: Marensin Sud
- Intercommunality: Maremne-Adour-Côte-Sud

Government
  - Mayor (2020–2026): Aline Marchand
- Area^{1}: 27.66 km^{2} (10.68 sq mi)
- Elevation: 26 m (85 ft)
- Highest elevation: 55 m (180 ft)
- Lowest elevation: 0 m (0 ft)
- Population (2023): 1,299
  - Density: 46.96/km^{2} (121.6/sq mi)
- Time zone: UTC+01:00 (CET)
  - Summer (DST): UTC+02:00 (CEST)
- INSEE/Postal code: 40187 /40660
- ^{1} French Land Register data, which excludes lakes, ponds, glaciers > 1 km^{2} (0.386 sq mi or 247 acres) and river estuaries.

Moliets-et-Maa (French pronunciation: [mɔljɛts e ma]; Occitan: Moliets e Mar) is a commune in the Landes department in Nouvelle-Aquitaine in south-western France.

== Description ==
The principal economic activity is tourism and the village features long sandy beaches and golf courses.

The village proper and the beach area are around 2 km (1.2 mi) apart, a common feature of towns and villages in this region of France known as the Côte d'Argent. The "courant d'Huchet" flows into the Atlantic Ocean on the Moliets's beach.

== Heraldry ==
Coat of arms of Moliets-et-Maâ	Azure, a line of dunes Or placed on a terrace Vert on a pond of the field issuing from the base, overall a pine tree proper, flanked, in chief, by a cross pattée sewn Gules on the dexter side and a shell also Or on the sinister side.

== See also ==
- Communes of the Landes department
