= Vieux-Boucau-les-Bains =

- Commune
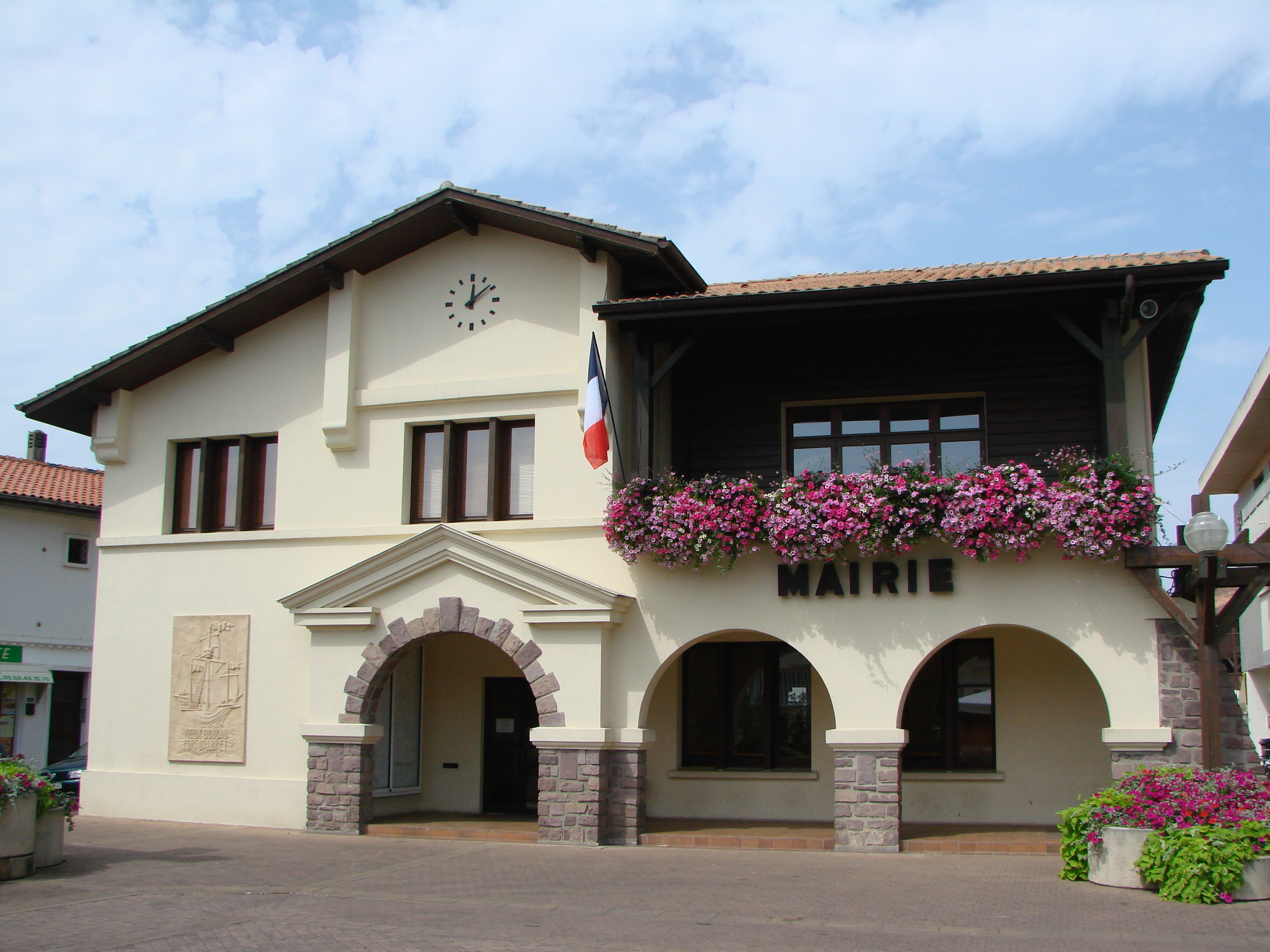
- Town hall

- Coat of arms
- Location of Vieux-Boucau-les-Bains
- Location within France Location within Nouvelle-Aquitaine
- Coordinates: 43°47′14″N 1°24′11″W
- Country: France
- Region: Nouvelle-Aquitaine
- Department: Landes
- Arrondissement: Dax
- Canton: Marensin Sud
- Intercommunality: Maremne-Adour-Côte-Sud

Government
  - Mayor (2020–2026): Pierre Froustey
- Area^{1}: 4.25 km^{2} (1.64 sq mi)
- Elevation: 3 m (9.8 ft)
- Highest elevation: 21 m (69 ft)
- Lowest elevation: 0 m (0 ft)
- Population (2023): 1,685
  - Density: 396/km^{2} (1,030/sq mi)
- Time zone: UTC+01:00 (CET)
  - Summer (DST): UTC+02:00 (CEST)
- INSEE/Postal code: 40328 /40480
- ^{1} French Land Register data, which excludes lakes, ponds, glaciers > 1 km^{2} (0.386 sq mi or 247 acres) and river estuaries.

Vieux-Boucau-les-Bains (French pronunciation: [vjø buko le bɛ̃], in Gascon: Lo Bocau Vielh) is a commune in the Landes department in Nouvelle-Aquitaine in southwestern France.

Vieux-Boucau means "old mouth" as it was where the Adour river used to flow in the Bay of Biscay, and was named “Port d'Albret” in the past. It could have been the first harbor of the Landes coastline, if the Adour river had not been diverted in 1578 for Bayonne.

During the 1970s, an artificial lake and a touristic complex were created and given the town’s old name of "Port d'Albret ". This complex was built in the territory of Vieux-Boucau and the nearby town Soustons. During summer, the population is between 10,000 and 15,000 inhabitants.

There are three beaches along the Atlantic Ocean and one on the lake.

== Geography ==
The commune has the smallest surface of the Landes department.

== Population ==
Historical population
Year	Pop.	±% p.a.
1968	903	—
1975	1,072	+2.48%
1982	1,151	+1.02%
1990	1,210	+0.63%
1999	1,379	+1.46%
2007	1,591	+1.80%
2012	1,541	−0.64%
2017	1,618	+0.98%
2023	1,685	+0.68%
Source: INSEE

== See also ==
- Communes of the Landes department
