= Azor (surname) =

Azor is a surname of Spanish origin. It may refer to the following notable people:

- Bidrece Azor (born 1988), Haitian-Italian football player
- Hurby Azor (born 1964), Haitian musician and hip-hop music producer
- John Azor Kellogg (1828–1883), American lawyer, politician, and Union Army officer
- Juan Azor (1535–1603), Spanish philosopher and Jesuit priest
