= Azzurra (given name) =

Azzurra is an Italian feminine given name meaning azure, the equivalent of the English Azura or Azure. It has ranked among the top 200 names for newborn girls in Italy since 1999, and among the top 20 names for Italian girls since 2021. It may refer to:

- Azzurra Cancelleri (born 1984), Italian politician
- Azzurra D'Intino (born 1991), Italian professional racing cyclist
