= Azure (name) =

Azure is a given name and surname meaning blue.

It may refer to:

== Women with the given name ==
- Azure Parsons (born 1984), American actress
- Azure Ryder (born 1996), Australian musician, singer-songwriter

== Surname ==
- Hunter Azure (born 1992), American professional mixed martial artist

== See also ==
- Azura (given name)
- Azzurra (given name)
