= Messanges, Landes =

Messanges
- Commune
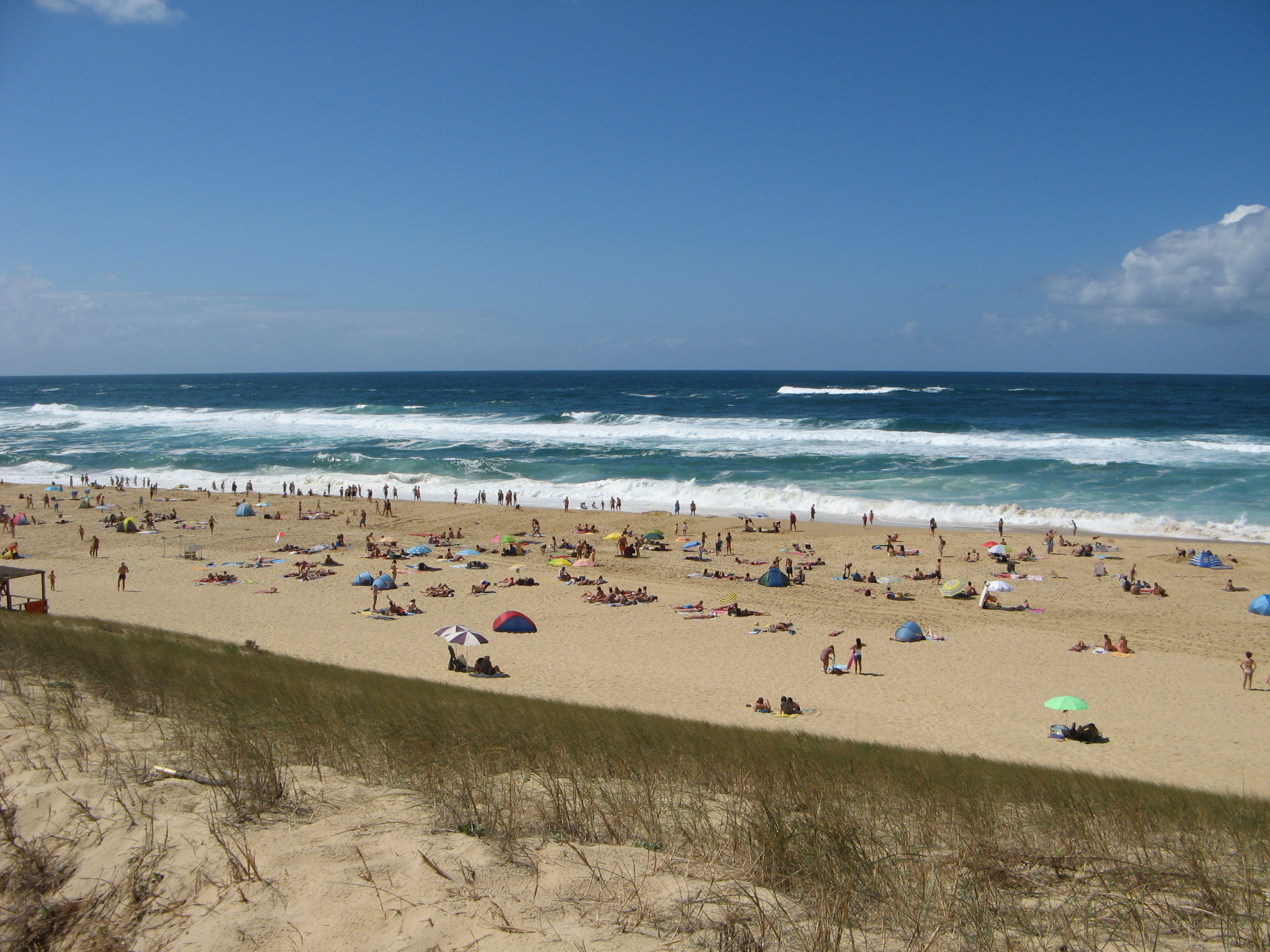
- The beach at Messanges
- Location of Messanges
- Location within France Location within Nouvelle-Aquitaine
- Coordinates: 43°48′59″N 1°22′39″W
- Country: France
- Region: Nouvelle-Aquitaine
- Department: Landes
- Arrondissement: Dax
- Canton: Marensin Sud
- Intercommunality: Maremne-Adour-Côte-Sud

Government
  - Mayor (2020–2026): Hervé Bouyrie
- Area^{1}: 34 km^{2} (13 sq mi)
- Elevation: 4 m (13 ft)
- Highest elevation: 60 m (200 ft)
- Lowest elevation: 0 m (0 ft)
- Population (2023): 1,086
  - Density: 32/km^{2} (83/sq mi)
- Time zone: UTC+01:00 (CET)
  - Summer (DST): UTC+02:00 (CEST)
- INSEE/Postal code: 40181 /40660
- ^{1} French Land Register data, which excludes lakes, ponds, glaciers > 1 km^{2} (0.386 sq mi or 247 acres) and river estuaries.

Messanges (French pronunciation: [mesɑ̃ʒ]; Occitan: Massanjas) is a commune in the Landes department in Nouvelle-Aquitaine in south-western France. Messanges is a popular place for tourism but quite empty in the non-holiday season.

== See also ==
- Communes of the Landes department
