= Azur, Landes =

Azur
- Commune
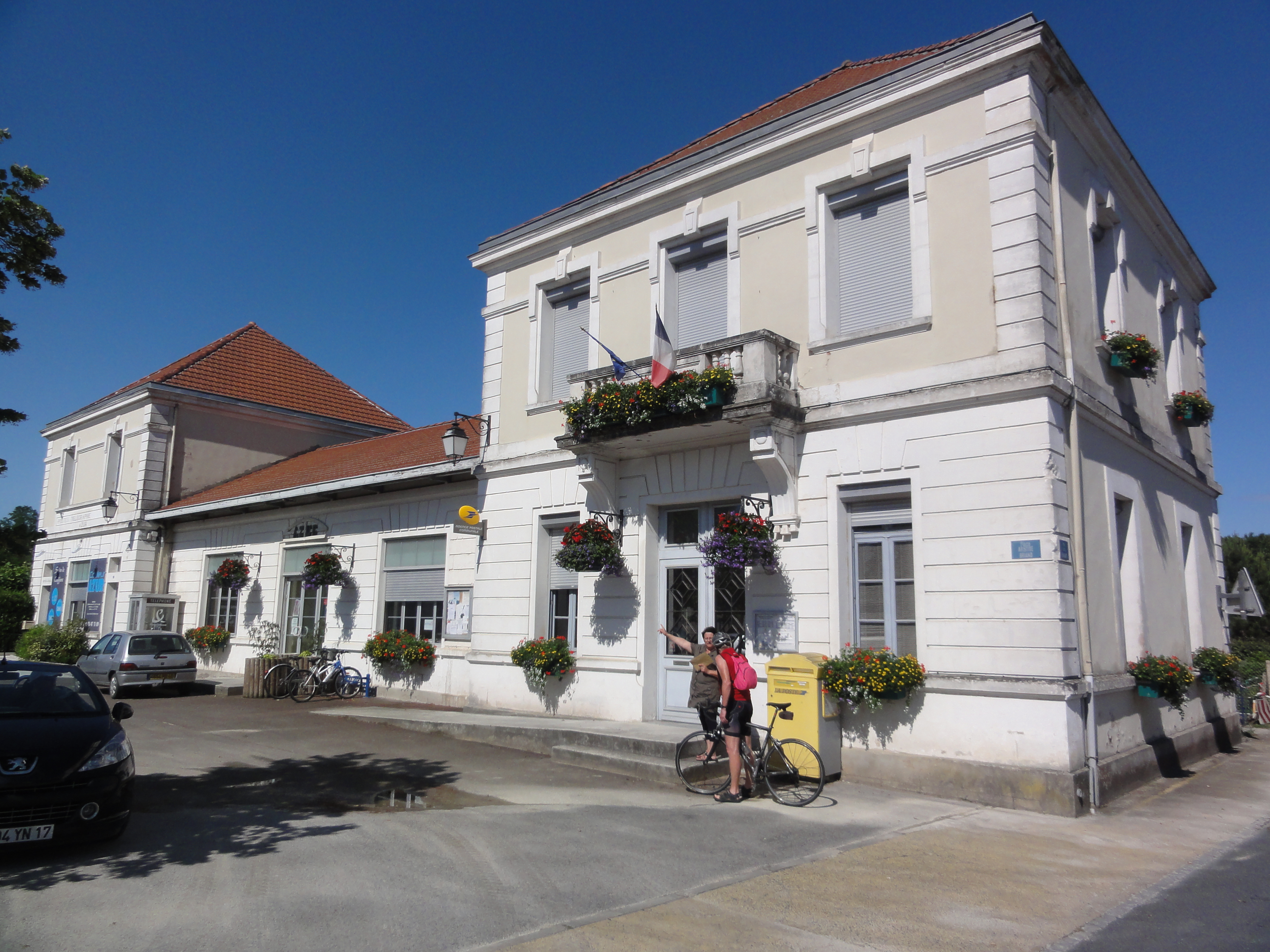
- Town hall
- Location of Azur
- Location within France Location within Nouvelle-Aquitaine
- Coordinates: 43°47′59″N 1°18′02″W
- Country: France
- Region: Nouvelle-Aquitaine
- Department: Landes
- Arrondissement: Dax
- Canton: Marensin Sud
- Intercommunality: Maremne-Adour-Côte-Sud

Government
  - Mayor (2022–2026): Dominique Duhieu
- Area^{1}: 16.94 km^{2} (6.54 sq mi)
- Elevation: 20 m (66 ft)
- Highest elevation: 49 m (161 ft)
- Lowest elevation: 3 m (9.8 ft)
- Population (2023): 988
  - Density: 58.3/km^{2} (151/sq mi)
- Time zone: UTC+01:00 (CET)
  - Summer (DST): UTC+02:00 (CEST)
- INSEE/Postal code: 40021 /40140
- ^{1} French Land Register data, which excludes lakes, ponds, glaciers > 1 km^{2} (0.386 sq mi or 247 acres) and river estuaries.

Azur (French pronunciation: [azyʁ]; Occitan: Asur) is a commune in the Landes department in Nouvelle-Aquitaine in southwestern France.

== Population ==
Historical population
Year	Pop.	±% p.a.
1968	347	—
1975	362	+0.61%
1982	357	−0.20%
1990	377	+0.68%
1999	447	+1.91%
2007	523	+1.98%
2012	652	+4.51%
2017	842	+5.25%
2023	988	+2.70%
Source: INSEE

== See also ==
- Communes of the Landes department
