= Hardingshute Manor =

Manor house in Isle of Wight, United Kingdom

Hardingshute Manor (also Hortyngeschete, 13th century; Hortyngshute, Hortyngshott, 15th century; Hustingshute, 16th century; Arthingshoote, Ortingshote, 18th century) is a manor house in the parish of Brading on the Isle of Wight.

== History ==
Hardingshute lies to the north of Brading and Nunwell. In the 13th century land at Hardingshute was held by Richard Malet, whose heirs are returned in the Testa de Nevill as holding a seventh of a fee under Robert de Glamorgan, and William atte Welle held an eighth of a fee there in 1431. The estate, which afterwards became known as the manor of Hardingshute, belonged, however, to the Lisles of Wootton. In 1306 Sir John de Insula, was granted free warren in the demesne lands there, and six years later granted to Walter Paye half an acre in the vill of Hardingshute. The manor then passed with South Shorwell (q.v.) to Michael Dennis, who exchanged it in 1557 for part of the manor of Compton with George Oglander. It has since followed the same descent as Nunwell, and as of 1912 was owned by Mr. J. H. Oglander.
