= Seignosse =

- Commune
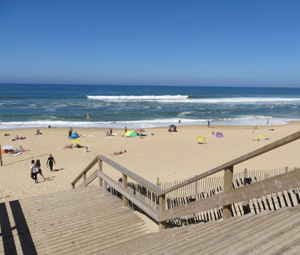
- Location of Seignosse
- Location within France Location within Nouvelle-Aquitaine
- Coordinates: 43°41′24″N 1°22′18″W
- Country: France
- Region: Nouvelle-Aquitaine
- Department: Landes
- Arrondissement: Dax
- Canton: Marensin Sud
- Intercommunality: Maremne-Adour-Côte-Sud

Government
  - Mayor (2023–2026): Pierre Pécastaings
- Area^{1}: 35.09 km^{2} (13.55 sq mi)
- Elevation: 18 m (59 ft)
- Highest elevation: 62 m (203 ft)
- Lowest elevation: 0 m (0 ft)
- Population (2023): 4,056
  - Density: 115.6/km^{2} (299.4/sq mi)
- Time zone: UTC+01:00 (CET)
  - Summer (DST): UTC+02:00 (CEST)
- INSEE/Postal code: 40296 /40510
- ^{1} French Land Register data, which excludes lakes, ponds, glaciers > 1 km^{2} (0.386 sq mi or 247 acres) and river estuaries.

Seignosse (French pronunciation: [sɛɲɔs]; Occitan: Senhòssa) is a commune in the Landes department in Nouvelle-Aquitaine in southwestern France.

== Population ==
Historical population

| Year | Pop. | ±% p.a. |
|---|---|---|
| 1793 | 372 | — |
| 1821 | 384 | +0.11% |
| 1846 | 464 | +0.76% |
| 1872 | 510 | +0.36% |
| 1901 | 643 | +0.80% |
| 1926 | 569 | −0.49% |
| 1946 | 503 | −0.61% |
| 1962 | 641 | +1.53% |
| 1968 | 769 | +3.08% |

| Year | Pop. | ±% p.a. |
|---|---|---|
| 1975 | 1,003 | +3.87% |
| 1982 | 1,404 | +4.92% |
| 1990 | 1,630 | +1.88% |
| 1999 | 2,427 | +4.52% |
| 2007 | 2,955 | +2.49% |
| 2012 | 3,461 | +3.21% |
| 2017 | 3,872 | +2.27% |
| 2023 | 4,056 | +0.78% |

Source: EHESS and INSEE (1968-2023)

== Tourism and leisure ==
=== Surfing ===
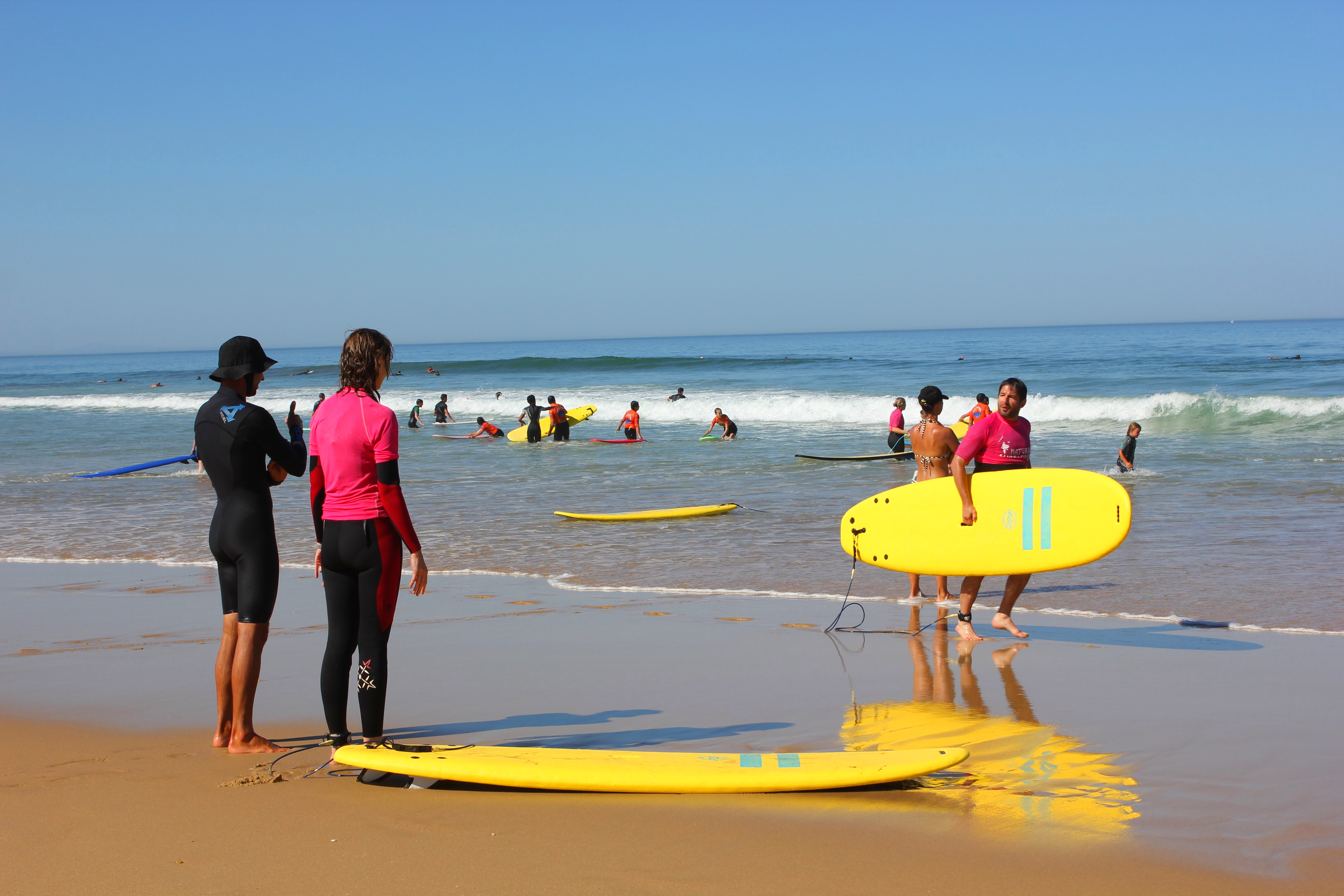
A surf school in Seignosse

Seignosse is prized for surfing. With Biarritz and Hossegor, Seignosse is one of the historic place of birth for surfing in France (head office of the "Fédération Française de Surf" from 1977 to 1984).

Surfers from all over the world know today the surf spots of Hossegor/Seignosse/Capbreton.

Seignosse has about thirty surf schools. They give lessons in Seignosse because the waves are steady and suitable for surf training.

Every year Seignosse organises together with Hossegor a stage of the Surfing World Championship for Professionals and many other competitions all year.

=== Golf course ===
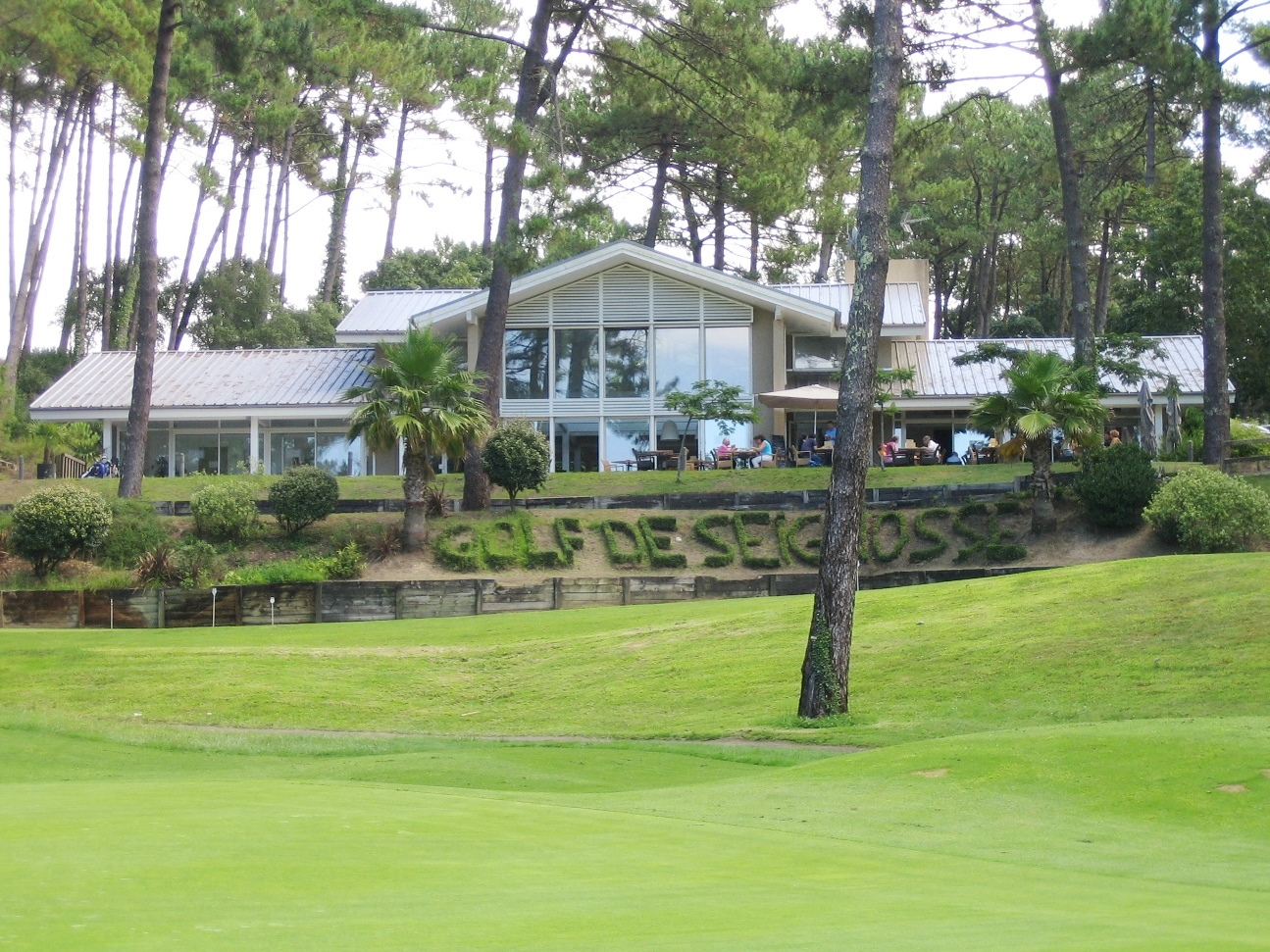
Seignosse golf course

Seignosse has an 18-hole golf course. The course extends over 70 ha and was designed by the French golf architect Pierre Thévenin and the American golf architect Robert van Hagge in 1989. The course (Par 72 of 6 124 m) rated as the best course in France by British golf operators, is set in a huge, undulating area planted with pines and cork oaks.

=== Water park ===
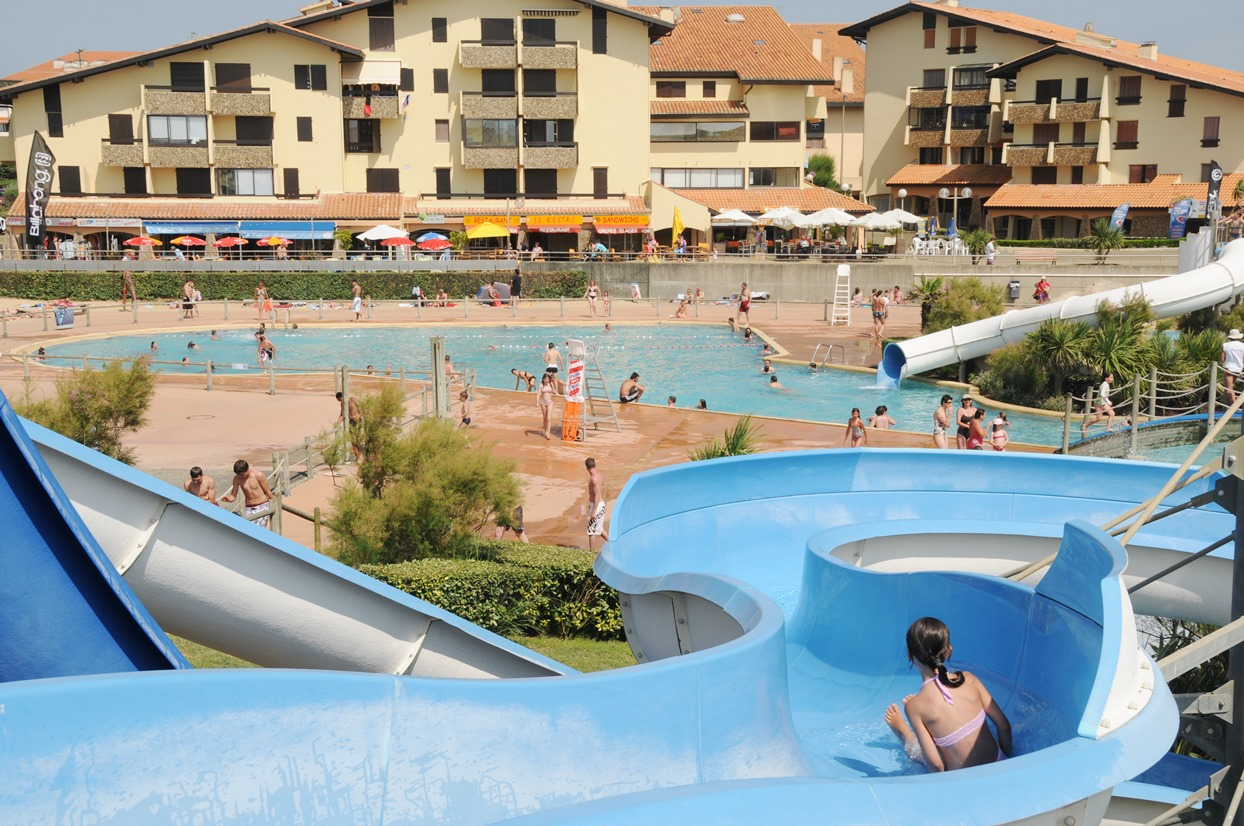
The water park "Atlantic Park" in Seignosse

Seignosse has a water park : Atlantic Park. It is the largest water and leisure park in the Landes "département". This private establishment features 2 800 m^{2} heated pools, multi-lanes water slides, tubes, tunnel, a kamikaze, a superkamikaze 9 m drop, whirlpools, 25 m pools, a cross-current river, paddling pools and minislides for kids. The water park features a bar/restaurant and shady picnic areas.

=== The nature reserve of "Etang Noir" ===
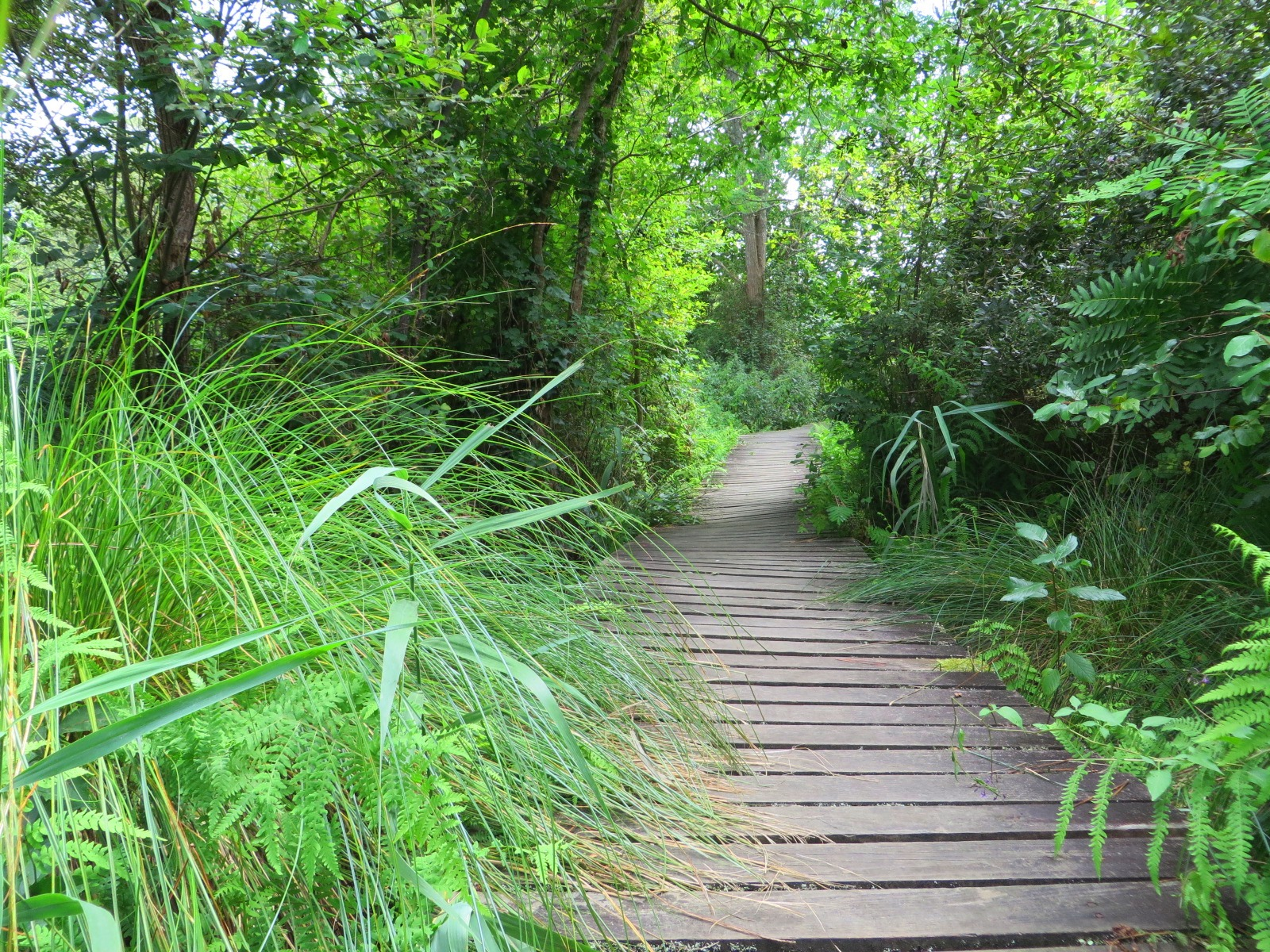
The nature reserve of Etang Noir in Seignosse

A raised boardwalk takes into the heart of a dense vegetation characteristic of damp moorland where numerous protected animal species are hiding. At the end of the boardwalk is the pond "Etang Noir". Guided visits are organised during the summer season. The reception centre supplies full information and a comprehensive guide on the fauna and flora of the reserve.

=== The Etang Blanc ===
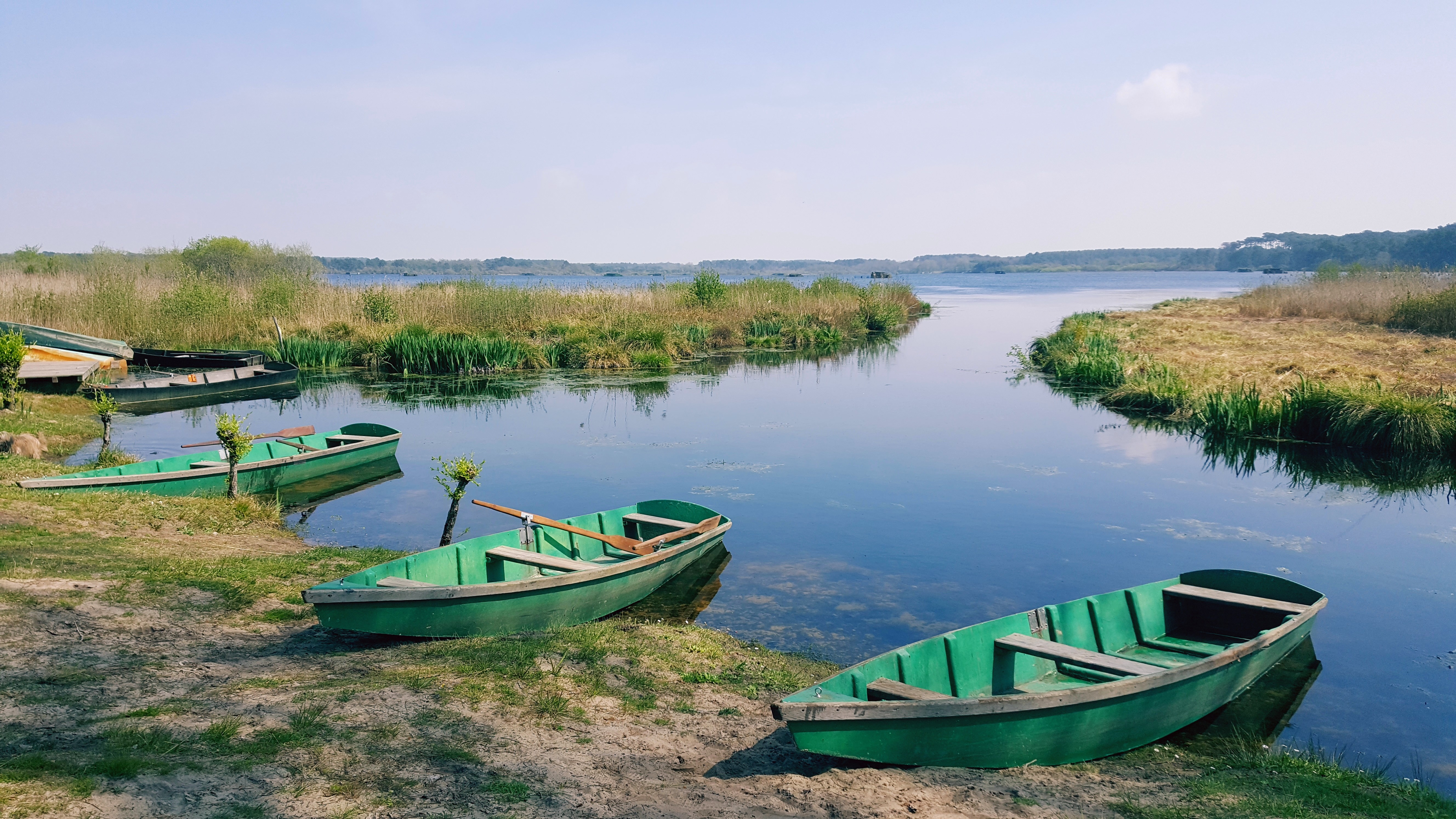
The "Etang Blanc" in Seignosse

The Etang Blanc is located in a natural environment surrounded by pines and cork oaks. It is possible to go fishing or get a row boat ride. The Etang Blanc features duck blinds on the water locally called "Tonnes".

The skate park : is located at the entrance of Le Penon beach.

=== Walking or cycling in Seignosse ===
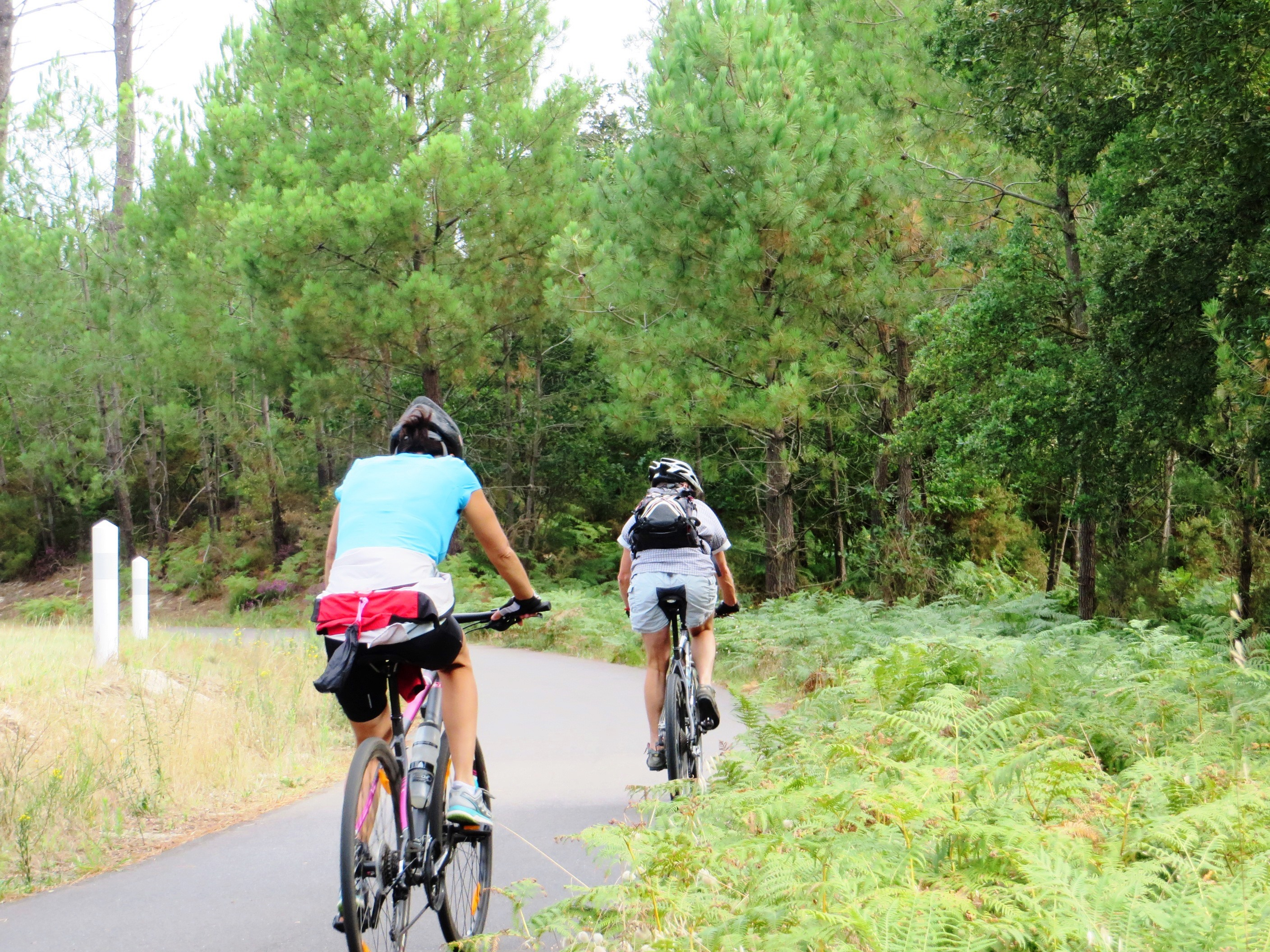
The cycle route "La Vélodyssée" in Seignosse

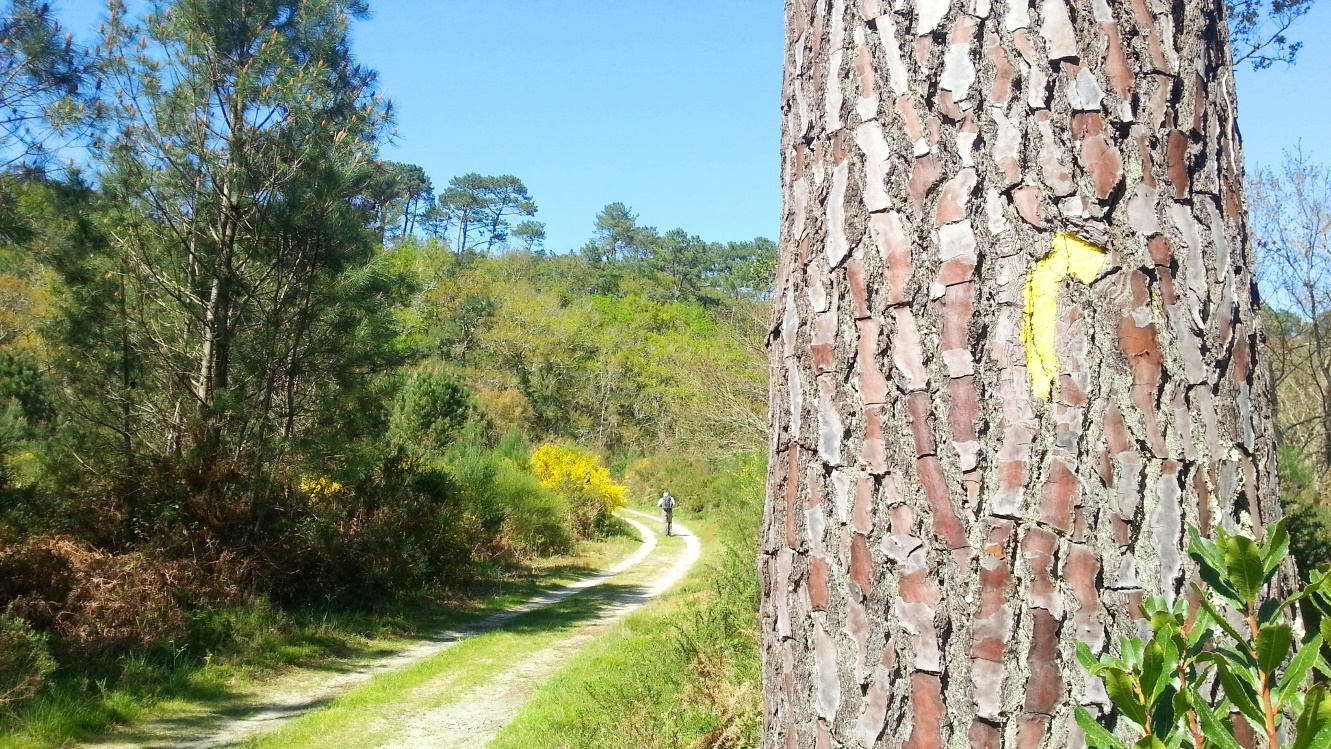
A walk in Seignosse

Seignosse has 70% forest cover. The "Landes" pinewood is the largest in Europe. Seignosse has over 40 km of signposted footpaths in the forest. The town features 20 km of cycle tracks including "La Vélodyssée", a cycle route along the French Atlantic coast from Brittany to the Basque Coast.

== Economy ==
Its two main economic drivers are woodcraft and tourism.

== Local culture and heritage ==
=== Sites and monuments ===
- "Saint André" church in Seignosse Bourg : built in the 13th century, it is dedicated to "St André", the patron saint of Seignosse. Part of the church was destroyed during the French Revolution. The church is mainly built with stone. The Gothic style bell-tower was built with stone from "Angoulême". In the old days, the bell was used as fire bell.
- "Sainte Thérèse" church in Le Penon : was built in 1973.
- Public wash house : in the past, place where washerwomen were meeting for the "big wash".
- the "Fronton" : place to play Basque Pelota (ball game).
- The performance hall "Les Bourdaines" : accommodate an audience of 2 500 persons. It has an original location next to the dune and welcomes concerts, shows and festivals all year.

=== Seignosse Océan ===
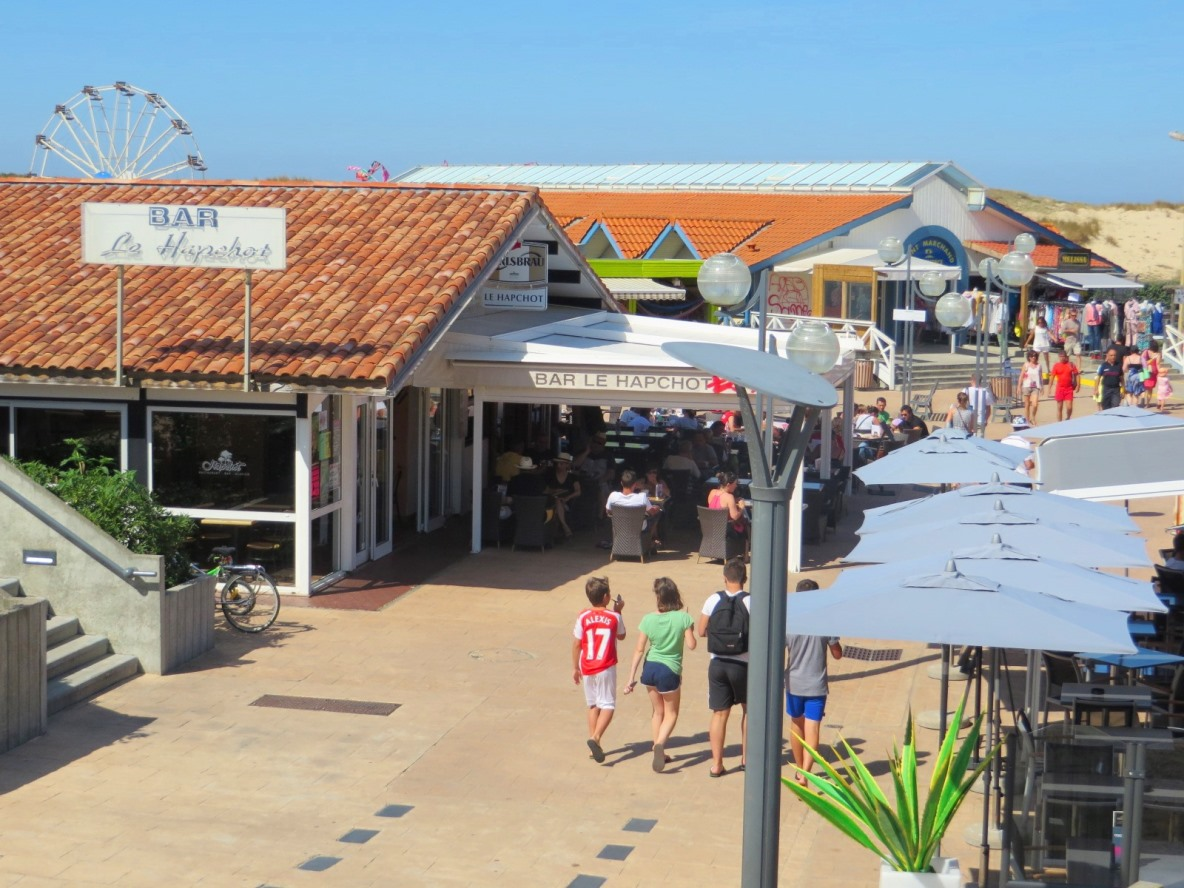
A view of the shopping centre in Seignosse

The classified sea resort, close to the ocean lies 5 km west of Seignosse Bourg. It was developed in the 1970s as part of the Aquitaine coastline development. It features a water park "Atlantic park", 4 patrolled beaches extending over 6 km : Les Casernes beach, Le Penon beach, Les Bourdaines beach, Les Estagnots beach. The resort has numerous shops, campsites and holiday villages.

During the summer season, a free shuttle bus drives to Seignosse beaches and to Hossegor and Capbreton.

Summer market : food, clothes, arts and crafts.

The resort was renamed "Seignosse Océan" in 2009. It features Les Estagnots, Les Bourdaines and Le Penon quarters.

=== Gastronomy ===
The town is steeped in traditional cooking with its quality products : duck, foie gras, asparagus, kiwis, beef from "Chalosse".

== See also ==
- Communes of the Landes department
