= Soustons =

- Commune
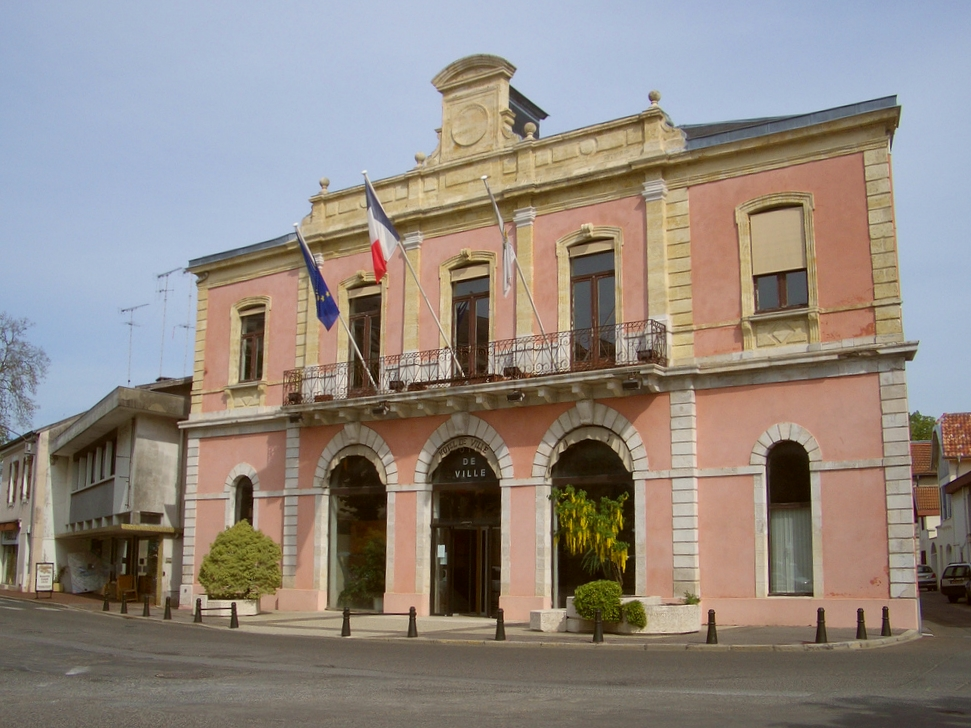
- Town hall

- Coat of arms
- Location of Soustons
- Location within France Location within Nouvelle-Aquitaine
- Coordinates: 43°45′09″N 1°19′42″W
- Country: France
- Region: Nouvelle-Aquitaine
- Department: Landes
- Arrondissement: Dax
- Canton: Marensin Sud
- Intercommunality: Maremne-Adour-Côte-Sud

Government
  - Mayor (2020–2026): Frédérique Charpenel
- Area^{1}: 100.38 km^{2} (38.76 sq mi)
- Elevation: 32 m (105 ft)
- Highest elevation: 62 m (203 ft)
- Lowest elevation: 0 m (0 ft)
- Population (2023): 8,701
  - Density: 86.68/km^{2} (224.5/sq mi)
- Time zone: UTC+01:00 (CET)
  - Summer (DST): UTC+02:00 (CEST)
- INSEE/Postal code: 40310 /40140
- ^{1} French Land Register data, which excludes lakes, ponds, glaciers > 1 km^{2} (0.386 sq mi or 247 acres) and river estuaries.

Soustons (French pronunciation: [sustɔ̃]; Occitan: Soston) is a commune in the Landes department in Nouvelle-Aquitaine in southwestern France.

== Population ==
Historical population

Year	Pop.	±% p.a.
1793	2,504	—
1800	2,578	+0.42%
1806	2,516	−0.40%
1821	2,247	−0.75%
1831	2,508	+1.10%
1836	2,560	+0.41%
1841	2,783	+1.68%
1846	2,846	+0.45%
1851	3,123	+1.87%
1856	3,164	+0.26%
1861	3,285	+0.75%
1866	3,582	+1.75%
1872	3,458	−0.59%
1876	3,578	+0.86%
1881	3,704	+0.69%
1886	3,842	+0.73%
1891	3,848	+0.03%
1896	3,902	+0.28%
1901	3,946	+0.22%

Year	Pop.	±% p.a.
1906	3,888	−0.30%
1911	3,951	+0.32%
1921	3,711	−0.62%
1926	3,773	+0.33%
1931	3,763	−0.05%
1936	3,702	−0.33%
1946	3,923	+0.58%
1954	4,034	+0.35%
1962	4,242	+0.63%
1968	4,522	+1.07%
1975	5,127	+1.81%
1982	5,102	−0.07%
1990	5,283	+0.44%
1999	5,743	+0.93%
2007	6,941	+2.40%
2012	7,398	+1.28%
2017	7,877	+1.26%
2023	8,701	+1.67%

Source: EHESS and INSEE (1968–2023)

Soustons hosts one of the LORAN-C transmitters.

== See also ==
- Communes of the Landes department
