= Azor (landowner) =

11th century English landowner

Azor was one of the most powerful English landowners at the time of Edward the Confessor in the 11th century. He was a kinsman and chamberlain of Brihtheah, a bishop of Worcester and a former abbot of Pershore. He owned property from Lincolnshire down to the Isle of Wight in many counties and like another great landowner of the times, Toki, he also owned urban property in addition to his vast possession of lavish country estates. He is mentioned in the Domesday Book and appears in countless histories of English counties along with his sons, Goscelin, William, and Henry who inherited his estates after his death. The sons in particular are linked with the early histories of many of the major manor houses on the Isle of Wight.
