= Billabong Pro Teahupoo 2017 =

Billabong Pro Teahupoo at the Surf
- Location: Teahupo'o (PYF)
- Dates: 11 to 22 August
- Competitors: 36

Medalists
gold medal	Julian Wilson	Australia
silver medal	Gabriel Medina	Brazil

The Billabong Pro Teahupoo 2017 was an event of the Association of Surfing Professionals for 2017 World Surf League.

This event was held from 11 to 22 August at Teahupo'o, (Tahiti, French Polynesia) and opposed by 36 surfers. The winner of the competition was Julian Wilson, who defeated Gabriel Medina in the final. The Tahitian competitors were both eliminated in the first two rounds.

== Round 1 ==
Heat 1
1	Joel Parkinson	(Australia)	10.00
2	Jadson Andre	(Brazil)	8.30
3	Jérémy Florès	(France)	7.50

Heat 2
1	A. de Souza	(Brazil)	8.77
2	Nat Young	(United States)	6.27
3	Bede Durbidge	(Australia)	3.63

Heat 3
1	Italo Ferreira	(Brazil)	12.50
2	Owen Wright	(Australia)	9.40
3	Josh Kerr	(Australia)	7.57

Heat 4
1	Joan Duru	(France)	12.26
2	Jordy Smith	(South Africa)	7.83
3	Ethan Ewing	(Australia)	7.17

Heat 5
1	John Florence	(Hawaii)	14.90
2	Ezekiel Lau	(Hawaii)	10.93
3	Aritz Aranburu	(Spain)	9.37

Heat 6
1	Matt Wilkinson	(Australia)	7.33
2	Taumata Puhetini	(French Polynesia)	7.13
3	W. Dantas	(Brazil)	7.10

Heat 7
1	Adrian Buchan	(Australia)	14.33
2	Filipe Toledo	(Brazil)	8.33
3	Miguel Pupo	(Brazil)	5.27

Heat 8
1	Julian Wilson	(Australia)	12.77
2	Conner Coffin	(United States)	12.40
3	Kanoa Igarashi	(United States)	10.03

Heat 9
1	Gabriel Medina	(Brazil)	14.06
2	Stuart Kennedy	(Australia)	8.60
3	Caio Ibelli	(Brazil)	6.50

Heat 10
1	C. O'Leary	(Australia)	13.10
2	L. Fioravanti	(Italy)	11.94
3	Sebastian Zietz	(Hawaii)	10.64

Heat 11
1	Kolohe Andino	(United States)	13.57
2	Mick Fanning	(Australia)	13.43
3	Jack Freestone	(Australia)	11.67

Heat 12
1	Ian Gouveia	(Brazil)	15.00
2	Michel Bourez	(French Polynesia)	10.67
3	F. Morais	(Portugal)	9.56

== Round 2 ==
Heat 1: 1 / Jordy Smith / (South Africa) / 11.83; 2 / Taumata Puhetini / (French Polynesia) / 9.60	Heat 2: 1 / Owen Wright / (Australia) / 14.50; 2 / Aritz Aranburu / (Spain) / 12.10	Heat 3: 1 / Ethan Ewing / (Australia) / 10.06; 2 / Filipe Toledo / (Brazil) / 6.56	Heat 4: 1 / Mick Fanning / (Australia) / 13.00; 2 / Josh Kerr / (Australia) / 8.16

Heat 5: 1 / Nat Young / (Hawaii) / 10.74; 2 / F. Morais / (Portugal) / 8.93	Heat 6: 1 / Michel Bourez / (French Polynesia) / 14.97; 2 / Jadson Andre / (Brazil) / 14.77	Heat 7: 1 / Sebastian Zietz / (Hawaii) / 11.50; 2 / Miguel Pupo / (Brazil) / 2.67	Heat 8: 1 / Kanoa Igarashi / (United States) / 10.53; 2 / Caio Ibelli / (Brazil) / 5.60

Heat 9: 1 / Conner Coffin / (United States) / 12.56; 2 / Stuart Kennedy / (Australia) / 7.10	Heat 10: 1 / Jérémy Florès / (France) / 18.77; 2 / L. Fioravanti / (Italy) / 16.60	Heat 11: 1 / Bede Durbidge / (Australia) / 10.50; 2 / Jack Freestone / (Australia) / 7.27	Heat 12: 1 / W. Dantas / (Brazil) / 12.57; 2 / Ezekiel Lau / (Hawaii) / 8.03

== Round 3 ==
Heat 1: 1 / Owen Wright / (Australia) / 13.77; 2 / Ian Gouveia / (Brazil) / 10.60	Heat 2: 1 / C. O'Leary / (Australia) / 14.33; 2 / Jérémy Florès / (France) / 13.27	Heat 3: 1 / W. Dantas / (Brazil) / 13.33; 2 / A. de Souza / (Brazil) / 9.57	Heat 4: 1 / Gabriel Medina / (Brazil) / 14.60; 2 / Bede Durbidge / (Australia) / 13.23

Heat 5: 1 / Kolohe Andino / (United States) / 16.67; 2 / Sebastian Zietz / (Hawaii) / 12.27	Heat 6: 1 / Matt Wilkinson / (Australia) / 11.57; 2 / Ethan Ewing / (Australia) / 8.67	Heat 7: 1 / John Florence / (Hawaii) / 18.70; 2 / Nat Young / (United States) / 15.23	Heat 8: 1 / Conner Coffin / (United States) / 13.77; 2 / Michel Bourez / (French Polynesia) / 12.90

Heat 9: 1 / Julian Wilson / (Australia) / 17.46; 2 / Italo Ferreira / (Brazil) / 16.54	Heat 10: 1 / Joan Duru / (France) / 16.40; 2 / Joel Parkinson / (Australia) / 14.40	Heat 11: 1 / Adrian Buchan / (Australia) / 16.70; 2 / Mick Fanning / (Australia) / 15.90	Heat 12: 1 / Jordy Smith / (South Africa) / 15.00; 2 / Kanoa Igarashi / (United States) / 2.46

== Round 4 ==
Heat 1
1	Owen Wright	(Australia)	14.50
2	C. O'Leary	(Australia)	13.40
3	W. Dantas	(Brazil)	13.40

Heat 2
1	Kolohe Andino	(United States)	13.37
2	Matt Wilkinson	(Australia)	12.50
3	Gabriel Medina	(Brazil)	6.00

Heat 3
1	John Florence	(Hawaii)	15.76
2	Conner Coffin	(United States)	7.90
3	Julian Wilson	(Australia)	4.00

Heat 4
1	Joan Duru	(France)	12.33
2	Adrian Buchan	(Australia)	11.43
3	Jordy Smith	(South Africa)	8.40

== Round 5 ==
Heat 1: 1 / Gabriel Medina / (Brazil) / 14.37; 2 / C. O'Leary / (Australia) / 11.66	Heat 2: 1 / W. Dantas / (Brazil) / 15.50; 2 / Matt Wilkinson / (Australia) / 12.00	Heat 3: 1 / Jordy Smith / (South Africa) / 11.93; 2 / Conner Coffin / (United States) / 11.40	Heat 4: 1 / Julian Wilson / (Australia) / 14.24; 2 / Adrian Buchan / (Australia) / 10.60

== Quarter finals ==
Heat 1: 1 / Gabriel Medina / (Brazil) / 18.23; 2 / Owen Wright / (Australia) / 13.94	Heat 2: 1 / Kolohe Andino / (United States) / 13.33; 2 / W. Dantas / (Brazil) / 7.67	Heat 3: 1 / Jordy Smith / (South Africa) / 14.50; 2 / John Florence / (Hawaii) / 13.10	Heat 4: 1 / Julian Wilson / (Australia) / 15.16; 2 / Joan Duru / (France) / 9.00

== Semi finals ==
Heat 1: 1 / Gabriel Medina / (Brazil) / 15.16; 2 / Kolohe Andino / (United States) / 13.90	Heat 2: 1 / Julian Wilson / (Australia) / 14.26; 2 / Jordy Smith / (South Africa) / 7.33

== Final ==
Heat 1
1	Julian Wilson	(Australia)	18.96
2	Gabriel Medina	(Brazil)	17.87
