= Oi Rio Pro 2017 =

Oi Rio Pro at the Surf
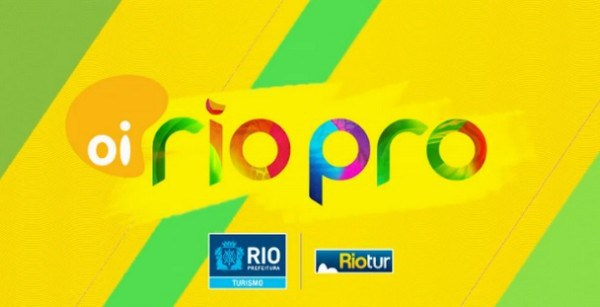
- Location: Rio de Janeiro (BRA)
- Dates: 9 to 20 May 2017
- Competitors: 36

Medalists
gold medal	A. de Souza	Brazil
silver medal	Adrian Buchan	Australia

The Oi Rio Pro 2017 was an event of the Association of Surfing Professionals for 2017 World Surf League. This was held from 12 to 24 April at Rio de Janeiro, (Rio de Janeiro, Brazil) and contested by 36 surfers.

Adriano de Souza was the winner.

== Round 1 ==
Heat 1
1	Nat Young	(United States)	13.84
2	Gabriel Medina	(Brazil)	13.10
3	Ezekiel Lau	(Hawaii)	10.60

Heat 2
1	A. de Souza	(Brazil)	12.26
2	Jadson Andre	(Brazil)	10.16
3	W. Dantas	(Brazil)	12.97

Heat 3
1	Jérémy Florès	(France)	14.44
2	Owen Wright	(Australia)	13.97
3	L. Fioravanti	(Italy)	10.10

Heat 4
1	Josh Kerr	(Australia)	14.27
2	Jesse Mendes	(Brazil)	12.63
3	Kolohe Andino	(United States)	11.84

Heat 5
1	Jordy Smith	(South Africa)	11.20
2	Bino Lopes	(Brazil)	11.06
3	Jack Freestone	(Australia)	8.16

Heat 6
1	John Florence	(Hawaii)	14.67
2	Yago Dora	(Brazil)	14.64
3	Miguel Pupo	(Brazil)	13.40

Heat 7
1	Filipe Toledo	(Brazil)	16.26
2	Ethan Ewing	(Australia)	10.84
3	F. Morais	(Portugal)	7.70

Heat 8
1	Ian Gouveia	(Brazil)	14.40
2	Adrian Buchan	(Australia)	13.53
3	Matt Wilkinson	(Australia)	6.23

Heat 9
1	Joel Parkinson	(Australia)	16.20
2	Joan Duru	(France)	15.70
3	C. O'Leary	(Australia)	7.00

Heat 10
1	Mick Fanning	(Australia)	14.44
2	Bede Durbidge	(Australia)	12.60
3	Michel Bourez	(French Polynesia)	10.13

Heat 11
1	Kanoa Igarashi	(United States)	13.77
2	Conner Coffin	(United States)	13.60
3	Sebastian Zietz	(Hawaii)	11.26

Heat 12
1	Julian Wilson	(Australia)	16.34
2	Stuart Kennedy	(Australia)	12.86
3	Caio Ibelli	(Brazil)	3.17

== Round 2 ==
Heat 1: 1 / Yago Dora / (Brazil) / 14.27; 2 / Kolohe Andino / (United States) / 13.23	Heat 2: 1 / Owen Wright / (Australia) / 16.00; 2 / Bino Lopes / (Brazil) / 8.97	Heat 3: 1 / Gabriel Medina / (Brazil) / 14.20; 2 / Jesse Mendes / (Brazil) / 10.66	Heat 4: 1 / Matt Wilkinson / (Australia) / 11.00; 2 / L. Fioravanti / (Italy) / 10.43

Heat 5: 1 / Jadson Andre / (Brazil) / 11.00; 2 / Michel Bourez / (French Polynesia) / 10.27	Heat 6: 1 / Sebastian Zietz / (Hawaii) / 10.90; 2 / Ethan Ewing / (Australia) / 5.07	Heat 7: 1 / Caio Ibelli / (Brazil) / 14.87; 2 / Joan Duru / (France) / 12.40	Heat 8: 1 / Bede Durbidge / (Australia) / 14.60; 2 / Conner Coffin / (United States) / 10.16

Heat 9: 1 / C. O'Leary / (Australia) / 18.20; 2 / Stuart Kennedy / (Australia) / 15.16	Heat 10: 1 / Adrian Buchan / (Australia) / 14.94; 2 / Miguel Pupo / (Brazil) / 12.67	Heat 11: 1 / F. Morais / (Portugal) / 14.40; 2 / Jack Freestone / (Australia) / 13.53	Heat 12: 1 / W. Dantas / (Brazil) / 15.60; 2 / Ezekiel Lau / (Hawaii) / 15.26

== Round 3 ==
Heat 1: 1 / A. de Souza / (Brazil) / 15.67; 2 / Ian Gouveia / (Brazil) / 12.33	Heat 2: 1 / W. Dantas / (Brazil) / 18.27; 2 / Sebastian Zietz / (Hawaii) / 11.73	Heat 3: 1 / Gabriel Medina / (Brazil) / 14.30; 2 / Bede Durbidge / (Australia) / 13.86	Heat 4: 1 / Joel Parkinson / (Australia) / 15.43; 2 / Jérémy Florès / (France) / 11.44

Heat 5: 1 / Mick Fanning / (Australia) / 13.40; 2 / C. O'Leary / (Australia) / 11.90	Heat 6: 1 / Yago Dora / (Brazil) / 15.50; 2 / John Florence / (Hawaii) / 10.16	Heat 7: 1 / Jordy Smith / (South Africa) / 14.90; 2 / Jadson Andre / (Brazil) / 14.27	Heat 8: 1 / Adrian Buchan / (Australia) / 13.16; 2 / Caio Ibelli / (Brazil) / 11.24

Heat 9: 1 / Matt Wilkinson / (Australia) / 13.00; 2 / Josh Kerr / (Australia) / 12.73	Heat 10: 1 / Kanoa Igarashi / (United States) / 11.73; 2 / Filipe Toledo / (Brazil) / 8.57	Heat 11: 1 / Julian Wilson / (Australia) / 16.23; 2 / F. Morais / (Portugal) / 16.13	Heat 12: 1 / Owen Wright / (Australia) / 17.00; 2 / Nat Young / (United States) / 15.86

== Round 4 ==
Heat 1
1	A. de Souza	(Brazil)	17.27
2	W. Dantas	(Brazil)	16.53
3	Gabriel Medina	(Brazil)	16.53

Heat 2
1	Mick Fanning	(Australia)	17.50
2	Yago Dora	(Brazil)	15.13
3	Joel Parkinson	(Australia)	12.54

Heat 3
1	Adrian Buchan	(Australia)	15.67
2	Jordy Smith	(South Africa)	15.24
3	Matt Wilkinson	(Australia)	12.66

Heat 4
1	Owen Wright	(Australia)	17.23
2	Kanoa Igarashi	(United States)	16.83
3	Julian Wilson	(Australia)	15.94

== Round 5 ==
Heat 1: 1 / Joel Parkinson / (Australia) / 16.00; 2 / W. Dantas / (Brazil) / 14.16	Heat 2: 1 / Yago Dora / (Brazil) / 15.67; 2 / Gabriel Medina / (Brazil) / 14.83	Heat 3: 1 / Jordy Smith / (South Africa) / 15.70; 2 / Julian Wilson / (Australia) / 5.13	Heat 4: 1 / Matt Wilkinson / (Australia) / 14.33; 2 / Kanoa Igarashi / (United States) / 12.97

== Quarter finals ==
Heat 1: 1 / A. de Souza / (Brazil) / 18.50; 2 / Joel Parkinson / (Australia) / 11.00	Heat 2: 1 / Yago Dora / (Brazil) / 12.44; 2 / Mick Fanning / (Australia) / 12.34	Heat 3: 1 / Adrian Buchan / (Australia) / 16.37; 2 / Jordy Smith / (South Africa) / 13.47	Heat 4: 1 / Matt Wilkinson / (Australia) / 17.23; 2 / Owen Wright / (Australia) / 14.70

== Semi finals ==
Heat 1: 1 / A. de Souza / (Brazil) / 17.97; 2 / Yago Dora / (Brazil) / 11.97	Heat 2: 1 / Adrian Buchan / (Australia) / 16.97; 2 / Matt Wilkinson / (Australia) / 11.60

== Final ==
Heat 1
1	A. de Souza	(Brazil)	17.63
2	Adrian Buchan	(Australia)	17.23
