= J-Bay Open 2017 =

J-Bay Open 2017 at the Surf
- Location: Jeffreys Bay (ZAF)
- Dates: 12 to 23 July
- Competitors: 36 from 7 nations

Medalists
gold medal	Filipe Toledo	Brazil
silver medal	F. Morais	Portugal

The J-Bay Open 2017 was an event of the Association of Surfing Professionals for 2017 World Surf League.

This event was held from 12 to 23 July at Jeffreys Bay, (Eastern Cape, South Africa), it was opposed by 36 surfers. The finalist was Filipe Toledo of Brazil.

== Round 1 ==
Heat 1
1	Joel Parkinson	(Australia)	14.23
2	W. Dantas	(Brazil)	13.60
3	Miguel Pupo	(Brazil)	10.33

Heat 2
1	Bede Durbidge	(Australia)	13.84
2	Owen Wright	(Australia)	11.16
3	Josh Kerr	(Australia)	9.00

Heat 3
1	A. de Souza	(Brazil)	13.83
2	F. Morais	(Portugal)	13.73
3	Jadson Andre	(Brazil)	12.57

Heat 4
1	Jérémy Florès	(France)	17.00
2	Matt Wilkinson	(Australia)	12.27
3	Ethan Ewing	(Australia)	9.93

Heat 5
1	Conner Coffin	(United States)	17.04
2	Jordy Smith	(South Africa)	14.76
3	Michael February	(South Africa)	12.40

Heat 6
1	John Florence	(Hawaii)	19.37
2	Dale Staples	(South Africa)	16.03
3	Ian Gouveia	(Brazil)	13.07

Heat 7
1	Italo Ferreira	(Brazil)	15.27
2	L. Fioravanti	(Italy)	11.24
3	Kolohe Andino	(United States)	7.83

Heat 8
1	Kelly Slater	(United States)	16.27
2	Julian Wilson	(Australia)	15.84
3	Kanoa Igarashi	(United States)	8.77

Heat 9
1	Jack Freestone	(Australia)	16.00
2	Adrian Buchan	(Australia)	13.66
3	C. O'Leary	(Australia)	11.00

Heat 10
1	Gabriel Medina	(Brazil)	18.83
2	Stuart Kennedy	(Australia)	14.77
3	Caio Ibelli	(Brazil)	9.17

Heat 11
1	Mick Fanning	(Australia)	17.23
2	Sebastian Zietz	(Hawaii)	9.83
3	Joan Duru	(France)	6.17

Heat 12
1	Michel Bourez	(French Polynesia)	16.67
2	Filipe Toledo	(Brazil)	15.17
3	Ezekiel Lau	(Hawaii)	10.60

== Round 2 ==
Heat 1: 1 / Jordy Smith / (South Africa) / 10.67; 2 / Dale Staples / (South Africa) / 10.27	Heat 2: 1 / Matt Wilkinson / (Australia) / 13.10; 2 / Michael February / (South Africa) / 11.67	Heat 3: 1 / Owen Wright / (Australia) / 12.34; 2 / Ethan Ewing / (Australia) / 11.10	Heat 4: 1 / Jadson Andre / (Brazil) / 15.80; 2 / Kolohe Andino / (United States) / 13.20

Heat 5: 1 / Julian Wilson / (Australia) / 14.27; 2 / Josh Kerr / (Australia) / 12.53	Heat 6: 1 / C. O'Leary / (Australia) / 13.40; 2 / Miguel Pupo / (Brazil) / 13.10	Heat 7: 1 / L. Fioravanti / (Italy) / 16.63; 2 / Sebastian Zietz / (Hawaii) / 15.76	Heat 8: 1 / Filipe Toledo / (Brazil) / 19.63; 2 / Kanoa Igarashi / (United States) / 12.83

Heat 9: 1 / Caio Ibelli / (Brazil) / 16.43; 2 / Stuart Kennedy / (Australia) / 14.80	Heat 10: 1 / Joan Duru / (France) / 15.87; 2 / Adrian Buchan / (Australia) / 14.00	Heat 11: 1 / Ezekiel Lau / (Hawaii) / 17.03; 2 / W. Dantas / (Brazil) / 16.37	Heat 12: 1 / F. Morais / (Portugal) / 15.73; 2 / Ian Gouveia / (Brazil) / 14.00

== Round 3 ==
Heat 1: 1 / Joan Duru / (France) / 15.50; 2 / A. de Souza / (Brazil) / 14.40	Heat 2: 1 / Gabriel Medina / (Brazil) / 15.83; 2 / Bede Durbidge / (Australia) / 12.57	Heat 3: 1 / Owen Wright / (Australia) / 16.83; 2 / Ezekiel Lau / (Hawaii) / 9.67	Heat 4: 1 / F. Morais / (Portugal) / 13.07; 2 / C. O'Leary / (Australia) / 12.16

Heat 5: 1 / Mick Fanning / (Australia) / 14.24; 2 / Caio Ibelli / (Brazil) / 12.67	Heat 6: 1 / John Florence / (Hawaii) / 18.27; 2 / Jadson Andre / (Brazil) / 9.94	Heat 7: 1 / Jordy Smith / (South Africa) / 20.00; 2 / L. Fioravanti / (Italy) / 16.17	Heat 8: 1 / Filipe Toledo / (Brazil); 2 / Kelly Slater / (United States) / INJ

Heat 9: 1 / Julian Wilson / (Australia) / 18.27; 2 / Jérémy Florès / (France) / 15.30	Heat 10: 1 / Conner Coffin / (United States) / 18.67; 2 / Joel Parkinson / (Australia) / 15.90	Heat 11: 1 / Michel Bourez / (French Polynesia) / 16.73; 2 / Italo Ferreira / (Brazil) / 16.07	Heat 12: 1 / Matt Wilkinson / (Australia) / 16.54; 2 / Jack Freestone / (Australia) / 13.47

== Round 4 ==
Heat 1
1	Gabriel Medina	(Brazil)	17.84
2	Joan Duru	(France)	16.07
3	Owen Wright	(Australia)	13.10

Heat 2
1	F. Morais	(Portugal)	19.07
2	John Florence	(Hawaii)	17.17
3	Mick Fanning	(Australia)	14.90

Heat 3
1	Filipe Toledo	(Brazil)	19.00
2	Jordy Smith	(South Africa)	17.40
3	Julian Wilson	(Australia)	13.50

Heat 4
1	Matt Wilkinson	(Australia)	17.93
2	Michel Bourez	(French Polynesia)	15.33
3	Conner Coffin	(United States)	15.20

== Round 5 ==
Heat 1: 1 / Mick Fanning / (Australia) / 16.80; 2 / Joan Duru / (France) / 15.27	Heat 2: 1 / John Florence / (Hawaii) / 16.50; 2 / Owen Wright / (Australia) / 14.50	Heat 3: 1 / Jordy Smith / (South Africa) / 19.37; 2 / Conner Coffin / (United States) / 17.74	Heat 4: 1 / Julian Wilson / (Australia) / 15.94; 2 / Michel Bourez / (French Polynesia) / 8.83

== Quarter finals ==
Heat 1: 1 / Gabriel Medina / (Brazil) / 17.40; 2 / Mick Fanning / (Australia) / 11.33	Heat 2: 1 / F. Morais / (Portugal) / 19.77; 2 / John Florence / (Hawaii) / 18.67	Heat 3: 1 / Filipe Toledo / (Brazil) / 18.70; 2 / Jordy Smith / (South Africa) / 13.26	Heat 4: 1 / Julian Wilson / (Australia) / 16.07; 2 / Matt Wilkinson / (Australia) / 14.77

== Semi finals ==
Heat 1: 1 / F. Morais / (Portugal) / 17.37; 2 / Gabriel Medina / (Brazil) / 14.70	Heat 2: 1 / Filipe Toledo / (Brazil) / 16.63; 2 / Julian Wilson / (Australia) / 11.33

== Final ==
Heat 1
1	Filipe Toledo	(Brazil)	18.00
2	F. Morais	(Portugal)	17.73

== Prizes and placing ==
Place	Name	Country	CT Points	Prizemoney
1	Filipe Toledo	(Brazil)	10000	$100,000
2	Frederico Morais	(Portugal)	8000	$50,000
3	Julian Wilson	(Australia)	6500	$25,000
3	Gabriel Medina	(Brazil)	6500	$25,000
5	Mick Fanning	(Australia)	5200	$16,500
5	John John Florence	(Hawaii)	5200	$16,500
5	Matt Wilkinson	(Australia)	5200	$16,500
5	Jordy Smith	(South Africa)	5200	$16,500
9	Conner Coffin	(United States)	4000	$13,750
9	Owen Wright	(Australia)	4000	$13,750
9	Michel Bourez	(French Polynesia)	4000	$13,750
9	Joan Duru	(France)	4000	$13,750
13	Caio Ibelli	(Brazil)	1750	$11,500
13	Italo Ferreira	(Brazil)	1750	$11,500
13	Ezekiel Lau	(Hawaii)	1750	$11,500
13	Jack Freestone	(Australia)	1750	$11,500
13	Leonardo Fioravanti	(Italy)	1750	$11,500
13	Conner O'Leary	(Australia)	1750	$11,500
13	Jadson Andre	(Brazil)	1750	$11,500
13	Kelly Slater	(United States)	1750	$11,500
13	Adriano De Souza	(Brazil)	1750	$11,500
13	Joel Parkinson	(Australia)	1750	$11,500
13	Bede Durbidge	(Australia)	1750	$11,500
13	Jeremy Flores	(France)	1750	$11,500
25	Michael February	(South Africa)	500	$10,000
25	Dale Staples	(South Africa)	500	$10,000
25	Ian Gouveia	(Brazil)	500	$10,000
25	Kolohe Andino	(United States)	500	$10,000
25	Miguel Pupo	(Brazil)	500	$10,000
25	Kanoa Igarashi	(Japan)	500	$10,000
25	Ethan Ewing	(Australia)	500	$10,000
25	Sebastian Zietz	(Hawaii)	500	$10,000
25	Stuart Kennedy	(Australia)	500	$10,000
25	Wiggolly Dantas	(Brazil)	500	$10,000
25	Adrian Buchan	(Australia)	500	$10,000
25	Josh Kerr	(Australia)	500	$10,000
