= Margaret River Pro 2017 =

Margaret River Pro 2017 at the Surf
- Location: Margaret River (AUS)
- Dates: 29 March to 9 April
- Competitors: 36 from 8 nations

Medalists
gold medal	John John Florence	Hawaii
silver medal	Kolohe Andino	United States

The Margaret River Pro 2017 is an event of the Association of Surfing Professionals for 2017 World Surf League.

This event was held from 29 March to 9 April at Margaret River, Western Australia and contested by 36 surfers.

It was won by John John Florence.

== Round 1 ==
Heat 1
1	Kelly Slater	(United States)	8.07
2	Mick Fanning	(Australia)	6.67
3	L. Fioravanti	(Italy)	1.00

Heat 2
1	Kolohe Andino	(United States)	8.77
2	Ezekiel Lau	(Hawaii)	7.00
3	Stuart Kennedy	(Australia)	1.20

Heat 3
1	Jack Freestone	(Australia)	6.77
2	Miguel Pupo	(Brazil)	3.17
3	Matt Wilkinson	(Australia)	3.10

Heat 4
1	Jordy Smith	(South Africa)	13.76
2	Nat Young	(United States)	12.00
3	Kanoa Igarashi	(United States)	1.77

Heat 5
1	Jesse Mendes	(Brazil)	11.07
2	Gabriel Medina	(Brazil)	7.26
3	W. Dantas	(Brazil)	5.30

Heat 6
1	John Florence	(Hawaii)	13.67
2	Jacob Willcox	(Australia)	4.40
3	F. Morais	(Portugal)	3.40

Heat 7
1	Ian Gouveia	(Brazil)	12.50
2	C. O'Leary	(Australia)	12.40
3	Owen Wright	(Australia)	8.70

Heat 8
1	Caio Ibelli	(Brazil)	9.16
2	Joel Parkinson	(Australia)	8.70
3	Jadson Andre	(Brazil)	4.80

Heat 9
1	Jérémy Florès	(France)	12.60
2	A. de Souza	(Brazil)	10.50
3	Adrian Buchan	(Australia)	6.24

Heat 10
1	Michel Bourez	(French Polynesia)	10.40
2	Joan Duru	(France)	4.50
3	Conner Coffin	(United States)	2.56

Heat 11
1	Julian Wilson	(Australia)	4.90
2	Bede Durbidge	(Australia)	3.33
3	Josh Kerr	(Australia)	0.00

Heat 12
1	Sebastian Zietz	(Hawaii)	14.83
2	Ethan Ewing	(Australia)	5.17
3	Filipe Toledo	(Brazil)	1.77

== Round 2 ==
Heat 1: 1 / Jacob Willcox / (Australia) / 10.53; 2 / Gabriel Medina / (Brazil) / 9.00	Heat 2: 1 / Nat Young / (United States) / 14.60; 2 / Matt Wilkinson / (Australia) / 11.84	Heat 3: 1 / Owen Wright / (Australia) / 14.40; 2 / Ezekiel Lau / (Hawaii) / 13.00	Heat 4: 1 / Joel Parkinson / (Australia) / 15.86; 2 / L. Fioravanti / (Italy) / 14.83

Heat 5: 1 / A. de Souza / (Brazil) / 14.60; 2 / Jadson André / (Brazil) / 10.84	Heat 6: 1 / Filipe Toledo / (Brazil) / 15.00; 2 / Joan Duru / (France) / 12.03	Heat 7: 1 / Bede Durbidge / (Australia) / 11.83; 2 / Josh Kerr / (Australia) / 11.34	Heat 8: 1 / Conner Coffin / (United States) / 14.50; 2 / Ethan Ewing / (Australia) / 12.77

Heat 9: 1 / Adrian Buchan / (Australia) / 16.50; 2 / F. Morais / (Portugal) / 15.50	Heat 10: 1 / C. O'Leary / (Australia) / 13.43; 2 / W. Dantas / (Brazil) / 8.94	Heat 11: 1 / Kanoa Igarashi / (United States) / 12.77; 2 / Mick Fanning / (Australia) / 12.76	Heat 12: 1 / Miguel Pupo / (Brazil) / 10.87; 2 / S. Kennedy / (Australia) / 9.17

== Round 3 ==
Heat 1: 1 / Jack Freestone / (Australia) / 13.83; 2 / Kelly Slater / (United States) / 11.07	Heat 2: 1 / Julian Wilson / (Australia) / 16.84; 2 / Miguel Pupo / (Brazil) / 3.33	Heat 3: 1 / Owen Wright / (Australia) / 14.24; 2 / Ian Gouveia / (Brazil) / 11.67	Heat 4: 1 / Michel Bourez / (French Polynesia) / 13.27; 2 / Kanoa Igarashi / (United States) / 10.83

Heat 5: 1 / Conner Coffin / (United States) / 15.57; 2 / Adrian Buchan / (Australia) / 11.43	Heat 6: 1 / John Florence / (Hawaii) / 19.27; 2 / Jacob Wilcox / (Australia) / 14.94	Heat 7: 1 / Jordy Smith / (South Africa) / 12.83; 2 / Jesse Mendes / (Brazil) / 9.67	Heat 8: 1 / Sebastian Zietz / (Hawaii) / 15.34; 2 / Caio Ibelli / (Brazil) / 14.16

Heat 9: 1 / A. de Souza / (Brazil) / 17.67; 2 / Bede Durbidge / (Australia) / 15.66	Heat 10: 1 / Jeremy Flores / (France) / 16.80; 2 / Joel Parkinson / (Australia) / 8.53	Heat 11: 1 / Filipe Toledo / (Brazil) / 11.96; 2 / C. O'Leary / (Australia) / 9.84	Heat 12: 1 / Kolohe Andino / (United States) / 12.54; 2 / Nat Young / (United States) / 10.83

== Round 4 ==
Heat 1
1	Owen Wright	(Australia)	17.44
2	Jack Freestone	(Australia)	15.80
3	Julian Wilson	(Australia)	11.86

Heat 2
1	John Florence	(Hawaii)	19.16
2	M. Bourez	(French Polynesia)	15.23
3	Conner Coffin	(United States)	11.50

Heat 3
1	A. de Souza	(Brazil)	16.83
2	Sebastian Zietz	(South Africa)	13.40
3	Jordy Smith	(South Africa)	9.96

Heat 4
1	Kolohe Andino	(United States)	14.77
2	Jeremy Flores	(France)	14.00
3	Filipe Toledo	(Brazil)	13.43

== Round 5 ==
Heat 1: 1 / Jack Freestone / (Australia) / 14.33; 2 / Conner Coffin / (United States) / 7.70	Heat 2: 1 / Michel Bourez / (French Polynesia) / 15.44; 2 / Julian Wilson / (Australia) / 14.20	Heat 3: 1 / Filipe Toledo / (Brazil) / 15.43; 2 / Sebastian Zietz / (South Africa) / 14.33	Heat 4: 1 / Jordy Smith / (South Africa) / 16.83; 2 / Jeremy Flores / (France) / 13.66

== Quarter finals ==
Heat 1: 1 / Jack Freestone / (United States) / 10.50; 2 / Owen Wright / (Australia) / 5.50	Heat 2: 1 / John Florence / (Hawaii) / 18.04; 2 / Michel Bourez / (French Polynesia) / 15.77	Heat 3: 1 / Filipe Toledo / (Brazil) / 12.83; 2 / A. de Souza / (Brazil) / 10.33	Heat 4: 1 / Kolohe Andino / (United States) / 18.77; 2 / Jordy Smith / (South Africa) / 16.86

== Semi finals ==
Heat 1: 1 / John Florence / (Hawaii) / 19.27; 2 / Jack Freestone / (Australia) / 10.57	Heat 2: 1 / Kolohe Andino / (United States) / 15.63; 2 / Filipe Toledo / (Brazil) / 15.00

== Final ==
Heat 1
1	John Florence	(Hawaii)	19.03
2	Kolohe Andino	(United States)	13.60
