= Quiksilver Pro Gold Coast 2017 =

Quiksilver Pro Gold Coast at the Surf
- Location: Gold Coast (AUS)
- Dates: 14 to 25 March
- Competitors: 36 from 9 nations

Medalists
gold medal	Owen Wright	Australia
silver medal	Matt Wilkinson	Australia

The Quiksilver Pro Gold Coast 2017 was an event of the Association of Surfing Professionals for 2017 World Surf League.

This event was held from 14 to 25 March at Gold Coast, (Queensland, Australia) and contested by 36 surfers.

The tournament was won by Owen Wright (AUS), who beat Matt Wilkinson (AUS) in final.

== Round 1 ==
Heat 1
1	Jadson Andre	(Brazil)	11.46
2	Michel Bourez	(French Polynesia)	10.27
3	Conner Coffin	(United States)	9.40

Heat 2
1	Matt Wilkinson	(Australia)	13.67
2	Stuart Kennedy	(Australia)	8.83
3	Ian Gouveia	(Brazil)	8.13

Heat 3
1	Kolohe Andino	(United States)	11.33
2	Jack Freestone	(Australia)	10.67
3	Kanoa Igarashi	(United States)	3.10

Heat 4
1	Gabriel Medina	(Brazil)	16.50
2	Wiggolly Dantas	(Brazil)	10.90
3	Ezekiel Lau	(Hawaii)	10.70

Heat 5
1	Jordy Smith	(South Africa)	11.93
2	Miguel Pupo	(Brazil)	11.77
3	Nat Young	(United States)	10.66

Heat 6
1	John Florence	(Hawaii)	16.83
2	Mikey Wright	(Australia)	13.50
3	Connor O'Leary	(Australia)	8.20

Heat 7
1	Mick Fanning	(Australia)	13.27
2	Jérémy Florès	(France)	13.13
3	Kelly Slater	(United States)	11.20

Heat 8
1	Julian Wilson	(Australia)	16.80
2	L. Fioravanti	(Italy)	12.07
3	Caio Ibelli	(Brazil)	10.90

Heat 9
1	Joel Parkinson	(Australia)	16.86
2	Joan Duru	(France)	16.40
3	Italo Ferreira	(Brazil)	11.66

Heat 10
1	Frederico Morais	(Portugal)	15.70
2	Filipe Toledo	(Brazil)	15.10
3	Adrian Buchan	(Australia)	13.43

Heat 11
1	A. de Souza	(Brazil)	16.17
2	Bede Durbidge	(Australia)	15.44
3	Josh Kerr	(Australia)	11.33

Heat 12
1	Owen Wright	(Australia)	16.83
2	Ethan Ewing	(Australia)	15.27
3	Sebastian Zietz	(Hawaii)	12.20

== Round 2 ==
Heat 1: 1 / Mikey Wright / (Australia) / 14.17; 2 / Michel Bourez / (French Polynesia) / 13.20	Heat 2: 1 / Kelly Slater / (United States) / 14.03; 2 / Nat Young / (United States) / 12.94	Heat 3: 1 / Ezekiel Lau / (Hawaii) / 12.33; 2 / Filipe Toledo / (Brazil) / 11.77	Heat 4: 1 / Sebastian Zietz / (Hawaii) / 16.40; 2 / Jack Freestone / (Australia) / 14.00

Heat 5: 1 / Ian Gouveia / (Brazil) / 11.57; 2 / Josh Kerr / (Australia) / 10.10	Heat 6: 1 / Jérémy Florès / (France) / 16.00; 2 / Adrian Buchan / (Australia) / 15.97	Heat 7: 1 / Italo Ferreira / (Brazil) / 17.83; 2 / L. Fioravanti / (Italy) / 11.70	Heat 8: 1 / Caio Ibelli / (Brazil) / 16.80; 2 / Joan Duru / (France) / 10.53

Heat 9: 1 / Conner Coffin / (United States) / 14.23; 2 / Bede Durbidge / (Australia) / 12.73	Heat 10: 1 / Stuart Kennedy / (Australia) / 16.27; 2 / Ethan Ewing / (Australia) / 13.37	Heat 11: 1 / Connor O'Leary / (Australia) / 15.03; 2 / Kanoa Igarashi / (United States) / 13.67	Heat 12: 1 / Miguel Pupo / (Brazil) / 15.77; 2 / Wiggolly Dantas / (Brazil) / 13.10

== Round 3 ==
Heat 1: 1 / Kolohe Andino / (United States) / 13.87; 2 / Jadson Andre / (Brazil) / 12.84	Heat 2: 1 / A. de Souza / (Brazil) / 14.93; 2 / Stuart Kennedy / (Australia) / 12.07	Heat 3: 1 / Matt Wilkinson / (Australia) / 15.10; 2 / Jérémy Florès / (France) / 14.60	Heat 4: 1 / Joel Parkinson / (Australia) / 17.24; 2 / Miguel Pupo / (Brazil) / 13.54

Heat 5: 1 / Italo Ferreira / (Brazil) / 14.60; 2 / Caio Ibelli / (Brazil) / 13.27	Heat 6: 1 / John Florence / (Hawaii) / 15.47; 2 / Mikey Wright / (Australia) / 14.17	Heat 7: 1 / Jordy Smith / (South Africa) / 17.30; 2 / Ezekiel Lau / (Hawaii) / 17.00	Heat 8: 1 / Owen Wright / (Australia) / 15.10; 2 / Mick Fanning / (Australia) / 15.00

Heat 9: 1 / Connor O'Leary / (Australia) / 14.93; 2 / Julian Wilson / (Australia) / 14.70	Heat 10: 1 / Kelly Slater / (United States) / 14.90; 2 / Frederico Morais / (Portugal) / 11.17	Heat 11: 1 / Conner Coffin / (United States) / 14.33; 2 / Sebastian Zietz / (Hawaii) / 14.20	Heat 12: 1 / Gabriel Medina / (Brazil) / 19.00; 2 / Ian Gouveia / (Brazil) / 14.56

== Round 4 ==
Heat 1
1	Matt Wilkinson	(Australia)	17.07
2	A. de Souza	(Brazil)	14.97
3	Kolohe Andino	(United States)	8.30

Heat 2
1	John Florence	(Hawaii)	14.17
2	Italo Ferreira	(Brazil)	13.10
3	Joel Parkinson	(Australia)	9.73

Heat 3
1	Connor O'Leary	(Australia)	10.77
2	Owen Wright	(Australia)	10.66
3	Jordy Smith	(South Africa)	9.77

Heat 4
1	Gabriel Medina	(Brazil)	15.76
2	Kelly Slater	(United States)	12.07
3	Conner Coffin	(United States)	11.17

== Round 5 ==
Heat 1: 1 / Joel Parkinson / (Australia) / 17.23; 2 / A. de Souza / (Brazil) / 12.43	Heat 2: 1 / Italo Ferreira / (Brazil) / 12.80; 2 / Kolohe Andino / (United States) / 10.56	Heat 3: 1 / Owen Wright / (Australia) / 14.76; 2 / Conner Coffin / (United States) / 14.17	Heat 4: 1 / Kelly Slater / (United States) / 14.70; 2 / Jordy Smith / (South Africa) / 13.30

== Quarter-finals ==
Heat 1: 1 / Matt Wilkinson / (Australia) / 15.00; 2 / Joel Parkinson / (Australia) / 12.37	Heat 2: 1 / John Florence / (Hawaii) / 14.86; 2 / Italo Ferreira / (Brazil) / 12.33	Heat 3: 1 / Owen Wright / (Australia) / 13.00; 2 / Connor O'Leary / (Australia) / 11.76	Heat 4: 1 / Gabriel Medina / (Brazil) / 14.34; 2 / Kelly Slater / (United States) / 13.83

== Semi-finals ==
Heat 1: 1 / Matt Wilkinson / (Australia) / 15.90; 2 / John Florence / (Hawaii) / 15.50	Heat 2: 1 / Owen Wright / (Australia) / 15.74; 2 / Gabriel Medina / (Brazil) / 10.44

== Final ==
Heat 1
1	Owen Wright	(Australia)	14.66
2	Matt Wilkinson	(Australia)	13.50
