= Rip Curl Pro 2017 =

Surf
- Location: Bells Beach (AUS)
- Dates: 12 to 24 April 2017
- Competitors: 36

Medalists
gold medal	Jordy Smith	South Africa
silver medal	Caio Ibelli	Brazil

The Rip Curl Pro 2017 was an event of the Association of Surfing Professionals for 2017 World Surf League. This was held from 12 to 24 April at Bells Beach, (Victoria, Australia) and contested by 36 surfers. Jordy Smith beats Caio Ibelli and won the 2017 Rip Curl Pro Bell Beach.

== Round 1 ==
Heat 1
1	Matt Wilkinson	(Australia)	12.73
2	Mick Fanning	(Australia)	12.40
3	Jadson Andre	(Brazil)	11.70

Heat 2
1	Owen Wright	(Australia)	15.67
2	Miguel Pupo	(Brazil)	13.33
3	Ezekiel Lau	(Hawaii)	9.77

Heat 3
1	Gabriel Medina	(Brazil)	15.04
2	Stuart Kennedy	(Australia)	12.03
3	L. Fioravanti	(Italy)	6.17

Heat 4
1	Nat Young	(United States)	16.66
2	Kanoa Igarashi	(United States)	14.43
3	Jordy Smith	(South Africa)	13.86

Heat 5
1	Kolohe Andino	(United States)	17.17
2	Jack Freestone	(Australia)	11.50
3	Samuel Pupo	(Brazil)	6.20

Heat 6
1	John Florence	(Hawaii)	17.20
2	Jérémy Florès	(France)	13.87
3	G. Ringrose	(Australia)	11.24

Heat 7
1	A. de Souza	(Brazil)	16.20
2	Joan Duru	(France)	14.17
3	Caio Ibelli	(Brazil)	10.60

Heat 8
1	Kelly Slater	(United States)	14.60
2	Josh Kerr	(Australia)	12.30
3	Ian Gouveia	(Brazil)	10.00

Heat 9
1	Michel Bourez	(French Polynesia)	15.20
2	Ethan Ewing	(Australia)	14.86
3	C. O'Leary	(Australia)	9.64

Heat 10
1	Adrian Buchan	(Australia)	14.74
2	Joel Parkinson	(Australia)	12.70
3	F. Morais	(Portugal)	11.53

Heat 11
1	Filipe Toledo	(Brazil)	19.70
2	Conner Coffin	(United States)	14.40
3	Bede Durbidge	(Australia)	13.84

Heat 12
1	Julian Wilson	(Australia)	16.56
2	W. Dantas	(Brazil)	14.10
3	Sebastian Zietz	(Hawaii)	11.94

== Round 2 ==
Heat 1: 1 / Jordy Smith / (South Africa) / 18.40; 2 / G. Ringrose / (Australia) / 8.83	Heat 2: 1 / Joel Parkinson / (Australia) / 16.57; 2 / Samuel Pupo / (Brazil) / 12.83	Heat 3: 1 / Sebastian Zietz / (Hawaii) / 16.93; 2 / L. Fioravanti / (Italy) / 16.84	Heat 4: 1 / Ezekiel Lau / (Hawaii) / 18.40; 2 / Conner Coffin / (United States) / 16.40

Heat 5: 1 / C. O'Leary / (Australia) / 13.00; 2 / Jadson Andre / (Brazil) / 6.33	Heat 6: 1 / Joan Duru / (France) / 16.24; 2 / Josh Kerr / (Australia) / 14.60	Heat 7: 1 / Caio Ibelli / (Brazil) / 17.26; 2 / Ian Gouveia / (Brazil) / 14.67	Heat 8: 1 / Mick Fanning / (Australia) / 18.20; 2 / Ethan Ewing / (Australia) / 12.03

Heat 9: 1 / F. Morais / (Portugal) / 17.94; 2 / Miguel Pupo / (Brazil) / 14.87	Heat 10: 1 / Bede Durbidge / (Australia) / 10.70; 2 / Stuart Kennedy / (Australia) / 13.74	Heat 11: 1 / W. Dantas / (Brazil) / 17.00; 2 / Kanoa Igarashi / (United States) / 15.80	Heat 12: 1 / Jérémy Florès / (France) / 16.70; 2 / Jack Freestone / (Australia) / 16.64

== Round 3 ==
Heat 1: 1 / F. Morais / (Portugal) / 13.94; 2 / Gabriel Medina / (Brazil) / 13.57	Heat 2: 1 / Caio Ibelli / (Brazil) / 17.03; 2 / Michel Bourez / (French Polynesia) / 16.10	Heat 3: 1 / Owen Wright / (Australia) / 17.54; 2 / Bede Durbidge / (Australia) / 13.83	Heat 4: 1 / Mick Fanning / (Australia) / 13.50; 2 / Kelly Slater / (United States) / 12.43

Heat 5: 1 / Sebastian Zietz / (Hawaii) / 17.07; 2 / Julian Wilson / (Australia) / 11.43	Heat 6: 1 / John Florence / (Hawaii) / 14.34; 2 / Nat Young / (United States) / 11.43	Heat 7: 1 / Ezekiel Lau / (Hawaii) / 14.00; 2 / Kolohe Andino / (United States) / 12.33	Heat 8: 1 / Filipe Toledo / (Brazil) / 18.27; 2 / Adrian Buchan / (Australia) / 15.56

Heat 9: 1 / A. de Souza / (Brazil) / 16.53; 2 / Jérémy Florès / (France) / 15.50	Heat 10: 1 / W. Dantas / (Brazil) / 13.73; 2 / Matt Wilkinson / (Australia) / 13.00	Heat 11: 1 / Joel Parkinson / (Australia) / 15.66; 2 / C. O'Leary / (Australia) / 10.60	Heat 12: 1 / Jordy Smith / (South Africa) / 18.10; 2 / Joan Duru / (France) / 14.44

== Round 4 ==
Heat 1
1	Caio Ibelli	(Brazil)	16.46
2	F. Morais	(Portugal)	15.50
3	Owen Wright	(Australia)	11.43

Heat 2
1	John Florence	(Hawaii)	19.54
2	Mick Fanning	(Australia)	18.86
3	Sebastian Zietz	(Hawaii)	12.94

Heat 3
1	Ezekiel Lau	(Hawaii)	16.73
2	Filipe Toledo	(Brazil)	15.67
3	A. de Souza	(Brazil)	14.20

Heat 4
1	Jordy Smith	(South Africa)	15.30
2	W. Dantas	(Brazil)	14.70
3	Joel Parkinson	(Australia)	14.60

== Round 5 ==
Heat 1: 1 / F. Morais / (Portugal) / 18.10; 2 / Sebastian Zietz / (Hawaii) / 13.16	Heat 2: 1 / Mick Fanning / (Australia) / 18.63; 2 / Owen Wright / (Australia) / 17.60	Heat 3: 1 / Filipe Toledo / (Brazil) / 16.76; 2 / Joel Parkinson / (Australia) / 15.00	Heat 4: 1 / A. de Souza / (Brazil) / 18.17; 2 / W. Dantas / (Brazil) / 17.60

== Quarter finals ==
Heat 1: 1 / Caio Ibelli / (Brazil) / 16.00; 2 / F. Morais / (Portugal) / 14.50	Heat 2: 1 / John Florence / (Hawaii) / 16.70; 2 / Mick Fanning / (Australia) / 15.77	Heat 3: 1 / Ezekiel Lau / (Hawaii) / 18.60; 2 / Filipe Toledo / (Brazil) / 16.66	Heat 4: 1 / Jordy Smith / (South Africa) / 16.77; 2 / A. de Souza / (Brazil) / 10.53

== Semi finals ==
Heat 1: 1 / Caio Ibelli / (Brazil) / 16.63; 2 / John Florence / (Hawaii) / 17.43	Heat 2: 1 / Jordy Smith / (South Africa) / 15.63; 2 / Ezekiel Lau / (Hawaii) / 15.17

== Final ==
Heat 1
1	Jordy Smith	(South Africa)	18.90
2	Caio Ibelli	(Brazil)	17.46
