= Ian Gouveia =

Brazilian surfer (born 1992)

Personal information
- Born: October 27, 1992 (age 33) Recife, Pernambuco, Brazil
- Height: 5 ft 6 in (168 cm)
- Weight: 152 lb (69 kg)

Surfing career
- Sport: Surfing
- Best year: 2017 - Ranked #23 WSL World Tour
- Career earnings: $166,950

Surfing specifications
- Stance: Goofy

Ian Gouveia (born October 27, 1992) is a Brazilian professional surfer who competes on the World Surfing League Men's World Tour since 2017.

== Early life ==
Ian Gouveia is a second-generation Championship Tour star from Recife, Brazil. His father, Fabio Gouveia, was the world amateur champion in 1988, and the first Brazilian to ever win a CT event in 1991 on his way to finishing No. 5 in the world. Ian has inherited his father's drive and his spring-loaded style, but added the full spectrum of modern aerial amenities and wrapped it in a goofyfoot package.

== Career ==
Gouveia qualified for the World Surf League (WSL) Championship Tour (CT) in 2017, drawing attention for his powerful surfing style. Following his junior career in Brazil, he joined the Qualifying Series (QS) in 2013, competing for three seasons and reaching a high ranking of No. 81. In 2016, a physical transition to a more powerful style of surfing improved his competitive results.

During the European leg of the tour, Gouveia won the Azores Airlines Pro and finishing third at the QS 10,000 Billabong Cascais Pro, which along with a solid performance at Sunset Beach which ultimately lifted him to the elite stage. During his 2017 rookie season, he finished just outside the automatic requalification cutoff. However, after finishing third at Pipeline, defeating Joel Parkinson, Matt Wilkinson, Julian Wilson and Filipe Toledo, he was awarded an open wildcard spot to the Championship Tour in 2018 season.

After failing to requalify for the 2019 CT, he competed in the access divisions until 2024, when he finished second in the Challenger Series rankings and won the Ballito Pro stage, securing qualification for the 2025 CT after a seven-year absence.

== Career Victories ==
WSL Challenger Series Wins
Year	Event	Venue	Country
2024	Ballito Pro	Ballito, KwaZulu-Natal	South Africa
WQS Wins
Year	Event	Venue	Country
2023	Circuito Banco do Brasil de Surf - São Sebastião	Maresias, São Paulo	Brazil
2023	Saquarema Surf Festival	Saquarema, Rio de Janeiro	Brazil
2016	Azores Airlines Pro	São Miguel	Portugal
Juniors Wins
Year	Event	Venue	Country
2011	Hurley Pro Junior	Sao Francisco do Sul	Brazil

=== WSL World Championship Tour ===
Tournament	2017	2018
Quiksilver Pro Gold Coast	13th	25th
Rip Curl Pro	13th	25th
Margaret River Pro	25th	25th
Rio Pro	13th	9th
Corona Bali Protected	-	25th
J-Bay Open	25th	-
Billabong Pro Teahupoo	13th	-
Surf Ranch Open	-	-
Quiksilver Pro France	13th	-
Rip Curl Pro Portugal	25th	-
Billabong Pipeline Masters	3rd	-
Fiji Pro	9th	-
Hurley Pro Trestles	25th	-
Rank	23rd	28th
Earnings	$136.250	$44.700
