= Fiji Pro 2015 =

Surfing event

Fiji Pro 2015 at the Surf
- Location: Namotu (FJI)
- Dates: 07 to 19 June
- Competitors: 36 from 9 nations

Medalists
gold medal	Owen Wright	Australia
silver medal	Julian Wilson	Australia

The Fiji Pro 2015 was an event of the Association of Surfing Professionals for 2015 ASP World Tour.

This event was held from 07 to 19 June at Namotu, (Tavarua, Fiji) and opposed by 36 surfers.

The tournament was won by Owen Wright (AUS), who beat Julian Wilson (AUS) in the final, becoming the first surfer to score 20.00 points (the maximum possible) in two heats of a single ASP World Tour event.

== Round 1 ==
Heat 1
1	Alejo Muniz	(Brazil)	12.12
2	Kolohe Andino	(United States)	11.54
3	Kelly Slater	(United States)	11.37

Heat 2
1	Taj Burrow	(Australia)	12.33
2	Matt Banting	(Australia)	11.13
3	Aritz Aranburu	(Spain)	10.50

Heat 3
1	Wiggolly Dantas	(Brazil)	13.84
2	Jay Davies	(Australia)	13.37
3	Josh Kerr	(Australia)	5.07

Heat 4
1	Adrian Buchan	(Australia)	15.16
2	Dane Reynolds	(United States)	8.53
3	Filipe Toledo	(Brazil)	8.50

Heat 5
1	Mick Fanning	(Australia)	13.77
2	Ricardo Christie	(New Zealand)	9.26
3	Aca Ravulo	(Fiji)	5.40

Heat 6
1	Kai Otton	(Australia)	15.60
2	A. de Souza	(Brazil)	8.86
3	Inia Nakalevu	(Fiji)	5.30

Heat 7
1	Gabriel Medina	(Brazil)	17.13
2	Jérémy Florès	(France)	13.93
3	C. J. Hobgood	(United States)	10.67

Heat 8
1	Sebastian Zietz	(Hawaii)	14.00
2	Owen Wright	(Australia)	13.67
3	Dusty Payne	(Hawaii)	7.50

Heat 9
1	Nat Young	(United States)	13.00
2	Miguel Pupo	(Brazil)	11.57
3	Glenn Hall	(Republic of Ireland)	10.77

Heat 10
1	Jadson Andre	(Brazil)	15.17
2	Adan Melling	(Australia)	14.60
3	Julian Wilson	(Australia)	11.34

Heat 11
1	Keanu Asing	(Hawaii)	11.50
2	Bede Durbidge	(Australia)	10.93
3	Matt Wilkinson	(Australia)	6.33

Heat 12
1	Italo Ferreira	(Brazil)	15.97
2	Joel Parkinson	(Australia)	15.20
3	F. Patacchia	(Hawaii)	11.47

== Round 2 ==
Heat 1: 1 / A. de Souza / (Brazil) / 13.50; 2 / Inia Nakalevu / (Fiji) / 6.87	Heat 2: 1 / Filipe Toledo / (Brazil) / 10.70; 2 / Aca Ravulo / (Fiji) / 8.86	Heat 3: 1 / Dane Reynolds / (United States) / 15.00; 2 / Josh Kerr / (Australia) / 14.10	Heat 4: 1 / Kelly Slater / (United States) / 18.70; 2 / Jay Davies / (Australia) / 9.47

Heat 5: 1 / Owen Wright / (Australia) / 10.10; 2 / Aritz Aranburu / (Spain) / 9.03	Heat 6: 1 / Julian Wilson / (Australia) / 12.93; 2 / C. J. Hobgood / (United States) / 10.67	Heat 7: 1 / Bede Durbidge / (Australia) / 15.67; 2 / Dusty Payne / (Hawaii) / 12.70	Heat 8: 1 / Joel Parkinson / (Australia) / 17.00; 2 / Glenn Hall / (Republic of Ireland) / 8.87

Heat 9: 1 / Adan Melling / (Australia) / 17.60; 2 / Matt Wilkinson / (Australia) / 12.50	Heat 10: 1 / F. Patacchia / (Hawaii) / 12.27; 2 / Miguel Pupo / (Brazil) / 5.70	Heat 11: 1 / Jérémy Florès / (France) / 17.70; 2 / Ricardo Christie / (New Zealand) / 17.47	Heat 12: 1 / Kolohe Andino / (United States) / 16.70; 2 / Matt Banting / (Australia) / 12.30

== Round 3 ==
Heat 1: 1 / Taj Burrow / (Australia) / 13.16; 2 / Keanu Asing / (Hawaii) / 6.36	Heat 2: 1 / Julian Wilson / (Australia) / 13.93; 1 / Kolohe Andino / (United States) / 13.34	Heat 3: 1 / Kelly Slater / (United States) / 18.57; 2 / F. Patacchia / (Hawaii) / 10.17	Heat 4: 1 / Wiggolly Dantas / (Brazil) / 15.36; 2 / Nat Young / (United States) / 13.94

Heat 5: 1 / Italo Ferreira / (Brazil) / 12.93; 2 / Jadson Andre / (Brazil) / 11.80	Heat 6: 1 / Dane Reynolds / (United States) / 18.34; 2 / A. de Souza / (Brazil) / 13.64	Heat 7: 1 / Mick Fanning / (Australia) / 13.67; 2 / Alejo Muniz / (Brazil) / 13.30	Heat 8: 1 / Joel Parkinson / (Australia) / 14.07; 2 / Sebastian Zietz / (Hawaii) / 13.30

Heat 9: 1 / Owen Wright / (Australia) / 16.26; 2 / Adrian Buchan / (Australia) / 9.44	Heat 10: 1 / Kai Otton / (Australia) / 14.97; 2 / Gabriel Medina / (Brazil) / 13.77	Heat 11: 1 / Jérémy Florès / (France) / 10.60; 2 / Bede Durbidge / (Australia) / 4.50	Heat 12: 1 / Adan Melling / (Australia) / 11.66; 2 / Filipe Toledo / (Brazil) / 10.97

== Round 4 ==
Heat 1
1	Julian Wilson	(Australia)	19.43
2	Kelly Slater	(United States)	14.34
3	Taj Burrow	(Australia)	13.83

Heat 2
1	Wiggolly Dantas	(Brazil)	11.30
2	Dane Reynolds	(United States)	10.77
3	Italo Ferreira	(Brazil)	10.67

Heat 3
1	Joel Parkinson	(Australia)	18.93
2	Owen Wright	(Australia)	17.26
3	Mick Fanning	(Australia)	16.60

Heat 4
1	Jérémy Florès	(France)	18.70
2	Kai Otton	(Australia)	12.10
3	Adan Melling	(Australia)	7.17

== Round 5 ==
Heat 1: 1 / Italo Ferreira / (Brazil) / 10.97; 2 / Kelly Slater / (United States) / 7.34	Heat 2: 1 / Taj Burrow / (Australia) / 15.24; 2 / Dane Reynolds / (United States) / 13.66	Heat 3: 1 / Owen Wright / (Australia) / 20.00; 2 / Adan Melling / (Australia) / 17.70	Heat 4: 1 / Kai Otton / (Australia) / 14.33; 2 / Mick Fanning / (Australia) / 11.33

== Quarter finals ==
Heat 1: 1 / Julian Wilson / (Australia) / 17.36; 2 / Italo Ferreira / (Brazil) / 17.00	Heat 2: 1 / Taj Burrow / (Australia) / 13.37; 2 / Wiggolly Dantas / (Brazil) / 7.40	Heat 3: 1 / Owen Wright / (Australia) / 16.60; 2 / Joel Parkinson / (Australia) / 12.84	Heat 4: 1 / Jérémy Florès / (France) / 16.83; 2 / Kai Otton / (Australia) / 12.90

== Semi finals ==
Heat 1: 1 / Julian Wilson / (Australia) / 11.50; 2 / Taj Burrow / (Australia) / 8.66	Heat 2: 1 / Owen Wright / (Australia) / 16.93; 2 / Jérémy Florès / (France) / 16.57

== Final ==
Heat 1
1	Owen Wright	(Australia)	20.00
2	Julian Wilson	(Australia)	7.84
