= Gabriel Medina =

Brazilian professional surfer (born 1993)

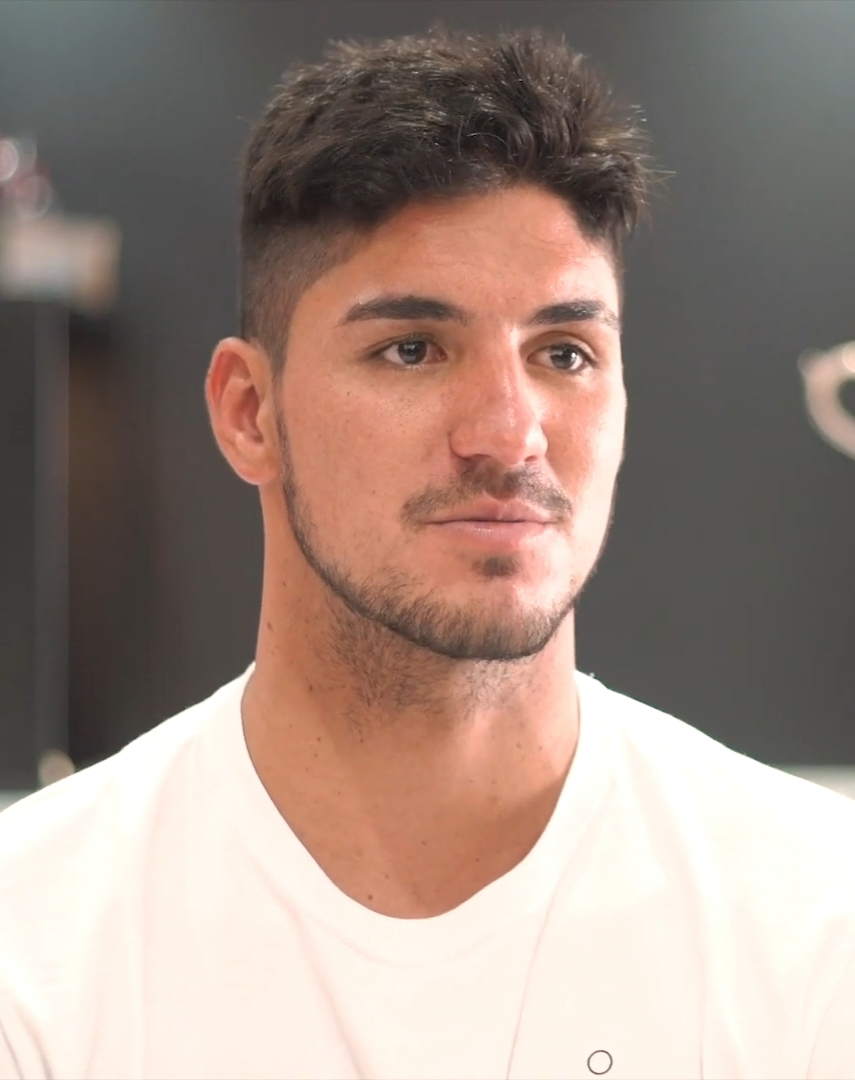
- Medina in 2018

Personal information
- Born: 22 December 1993 (age 32) São Sebastião, São Paulo, Brazil
- Height: 5 ft 11 in (180 cm)
- Weight: 169 lb (77 kg)

Surfing career
- Sport: Surfing
- Best year: 1st: 2014, 2018 and 2021 – WSL World Champion
- Sponsors: Matt Nabney, Rip Curl, Adidas, Guaraná Antarctica, Vivo, Audi, Samsung Galaxy, Oakley, Gorilla, FCS traction and fins, Vult, Coppertone, Tokoro Surfboards, Monster Energy, Corona (beer), Blaze Online Casino
- Major achievements: 3x WSL World Champion (2014, 2018, 2021); 2024 Olympics bronze Medal; WSL Championship Tour event wins: 19; 2013 WSL World Junior Champion; 2015 Vans Triple Crown of Surfing Champion; 2024 ISA World Surfing Games Champion

Surfing specifications
- Stance: Goofy
- Shaper: Johnny Cabianca
- Favorite waves: Teahupo'o
- Favorite maneuvers: Aerials, Barrels
Medal record
Men's surfing
Representing Brazil
Olympic Games
Bronze medal – third place	2024 Paris	Shortboard
World Games
Gold medal – first place	2019 Miyazaki	Team
Gold medal – first place	2024 Arecibo	Men
Gold medal – first place	2024 Arecibo	Team
Bronze medal – third place	2019 Miyazaki	Men
Bronze medal – third place	2023 La Bocana	Team

Gabriel Medina Pinto Ferreira (born 22 December 1993) is a Brazilian professional surfer. He won the 2014, 2018 and 2021 WSL World Championships. In two appearances at the Olympic surfing tournament, Medina won a bronze medal at the 2024 Olympic Games.

In 2009, at age 15, Medina became the youngest surfer ever to win a major Qualifying Series event. He joined the World Surf League Tour in 2011 alongside eventual rival John John Florence, and in his rookie year he finished within the top 12 of the ASP (now WSL) World Tour. Since 2015, Medina has earned more Championship Tour victories than any other competitor.

Media sources credit him as being the second person to have executed a maneuver called the "Backflip". Medina also became the first person to land this move in competition, during the Oi Rio Pro 2016.

== Life and career ==
Medina was born in São Sebastião, São Paulo, and raised in the city's district of Maresias. He is the son of Simone Pinto Medina and Claudio de Jesus Ferreira. Medina began surfing at age four and at 11 won his first national championship, the Rip Curl Grom Search in the category Sub-12, held in Búzios, Rio de Janeiro.

Medina won many Brazilian amateur championships, becoming champion at the Volcom Sub-14, Quicksilver King of Groms, and Rip Curl Grom Search, as well as winning the state championship three times. In California, he was second at the Volcom International Sub-14, and in Ecuador, vice-champion of the Amateur World Sub-16 Championship. At 14 years old, Medina participated in the finals of the Paulista Championship, became the Paulista Junior Champion, and surfed at the World Qualifying Series (WQS) 6-star event Onbongo Pro Surfing 2008 in Ubatuba, where he managed to defeat his idol Adriano De Souza, aka Mineirinho.

In July 2009, Medina won a contract with Rip Curl and endeavoured to pursue a professional surfing career after that. Ten days later, Medina became the youngest male winner of an open-age pro competition by winning the Maresias Surf International in Brazil at the age of 15. Medina's victory broke one of pro surfing's longest-standing records, held by Australian Nick Wood, who won the 1987 Rip Curl Pro at Bells Beach as a 16-year-old.

In 2011, Medina won several championships with top surfers, surfing the WQS 6 Star Prime in Imbituba, and the two WQS 6 Star in France and Spain. He was also victorious in the Pro Junior World Championship in French waves. Medina signed an extension contract with Rip Curl just in the same week of his debut on the 2011 ASP World Championship Tour, by the age of 17, by the mid-season rotation. Medina went on to finish his rookie season with two WCT events wins (Hossegor, France and San Francisco, US), despite competing for only half of the season.

In 2013, Medina went on to win the World Junior Tour (ASP) in 2013 at age 19.

In the 2014 WCT season, Medina won the Quiksilver Pro Gold Coast, becoming the first Brazilian male surfer ever to win on the Gold Coast and the first goofy to win the contest since 2004 and less than two months after recovering from a broken leg injury suffered while surfing in Hawaii. He dropped to 5th on the rankings after finishing 13th on the Billabong Rio Pro, but re-assumed the pole after winning the Volcom Fiji Pro. Medina also won the Billabong Pro Teahupoo, the seventh WCT event of the season in Tahiti, winning a highly competitive final with Kelly Slater. Later in the year, after finishing in 2nd place in the last event of the season at the Billabong Pipeline Masters in Hawaii, Medina went on to become the first ever Brazilian ASP World Champion by the age of 20 (the youngest since Kelly Slater did also in age 20 in 1992).

In 2015, after a sequence of average results, Medina won the Quiksilver Pro France, capturing his sixth WCT event win and his second in Hossegor, France. After beating Mick Fanning and reaching the finals at the last WCT event of the season, the Billabong Pipe Masters in Hawaii, for the second straight year, Medina became the first Brazilian ever to win the Hawaiian Triple Crown of Surfing title. With Adriano De Souza winning the other semifinal later and capturing the 2015 World Title (due to Fanning's loss to Medina), de Souza and Medina competed in the first ever all-Brazilian final at the Pipe Masters. Medina finished runner-up, with de Souza becoming the first Brazilian ever to win the Hawaiian CT event. With this second place, Medina finished the 2015 WCT season in 3rd place.

On 14 May 2016, during the Oi Rio Pro, Medina made history and became the first surfer ever to land the move "Backflip" in competition. As a result, Medina got a perfect 10 from all five judges, thus beating fellow countryman Alex Ribeiro in a 2nd round elimination heat. Medina went on to finish the competition in third place. On 17 June 2016, in the Fiji Islands, Medina won his seventh WCT event, his second in Cloudbreak, in heavy conditions. The win put him as the most victorious Brazilian surfer in the history of the CT only at the age of 22.

In the 2017 season, Medina made history as one of the two (Carissa Moore, in the women's division) first-ever surfers to win a competition in a man-made wave pool at Kelly Slater's Surf Ranch in Lemoore, California. Medina later also managed to secure two more event wins (Quiksilver Pro France and MEO Rip Curl Pro Portugal) reaching 9 WCT wins in his career, by the age of 23. Medina finished the season in second place, extending his streak of finishing the season in at least the top 3.

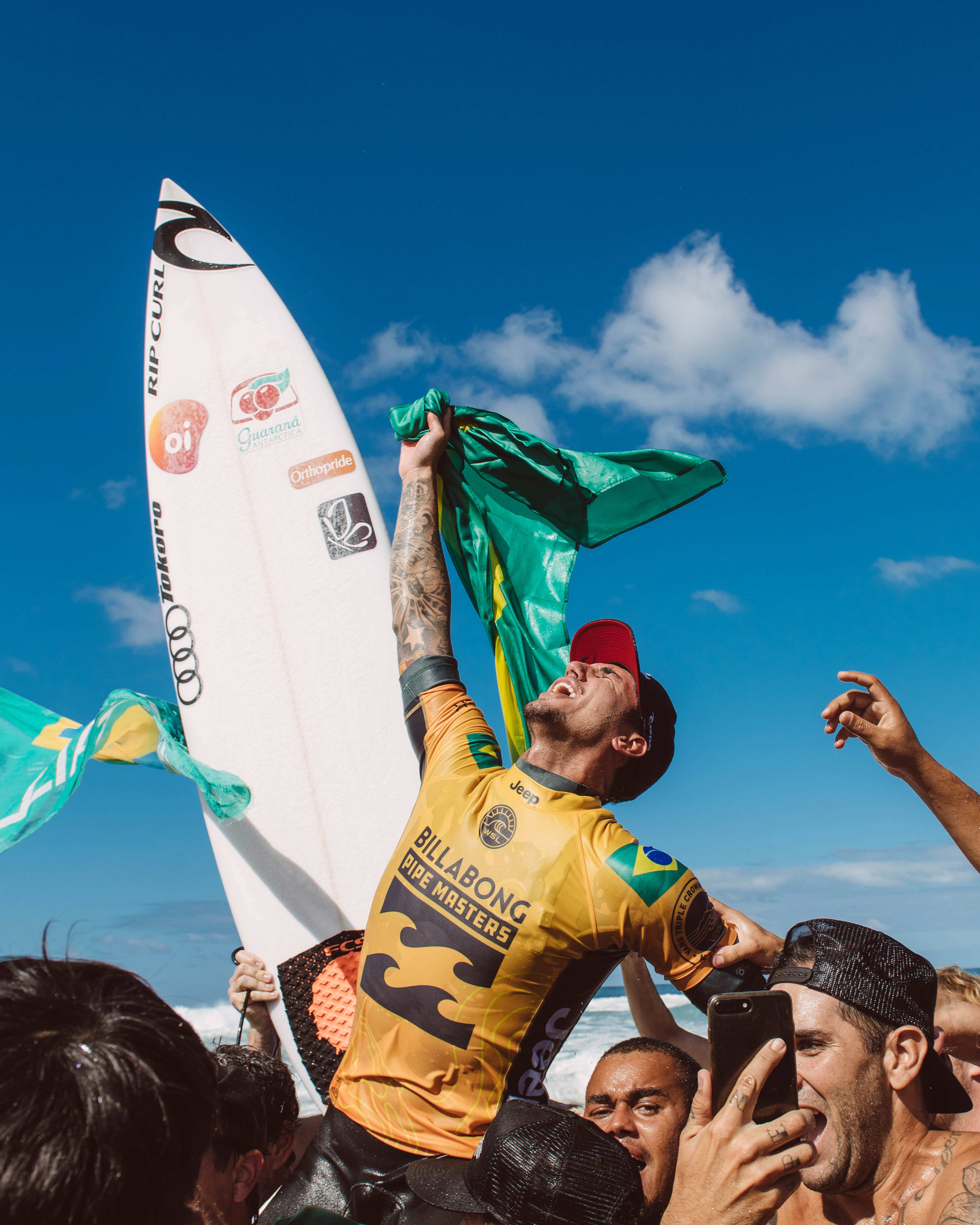
Gabriel Medina pictured after winning the 2018 Billabong Pipe Masters and 2018 WSL world title

In the 2018 season, Medina had better start than the previous 3 seasons and achieved victories at Tahiti, the wave pool in California, and Pipeline (including a 10-point ride in his quarterfinal heat), making him a two-time world champion and the most accomplished surfer from Brazil, by the age of 24. 2018 also was marked as a historic year for Brazilian surfing, as the country grabbed 9 event wins – Medina (3x), Ítalo Ferreira (3x), Filipe Toledo (2x) and William Cardoso – out of the 11 events on the 2018 Championship Tour calendar, in addition to Medina's second world title. CT surfer Jessé Mendes won the Vans Triple Crown of Surfing, becoming the second Brazilian surfer to accomplish the feat, beside Medina himself. Mateus Herdy became the WSL World Junior Champion in Taiwan, joining fellow Brazilians Medina, Adriano De Souza, Caio Ibelli, Lucas Silveira and Pablo Paulino (2x), and big wave surfers Rodrigo Koxa and Maya Gabeira winning each other the XXL Biggest Wave awards and setting new Guinness world records for largest waves surfed by a male and female surfer respectively.

In the 2019 season, after another sleepy start, Medina again claimed another win, his 13th CT event, in Jeffreys Bay, South Africa. Medina made history by being part of the first-ever goofy-footers final in J-Bay, against Ítalo Ferreira and for being second every goofy-footer to win the event, the first in 35 years (Mark Occhilupo). From 9–15 September, Medina, along with the top surfers from all over the world, competed in Miyazaki, Japan, in the 2019 ISA World Surfing Games, a mandatory event to be eligible to compete in the 2020 Olympic Games, also to be held in Japan. Medina competed in the Open Men's division and went on to finish the event with the bronze medal, behind fellow CT surfers Kolohe Andino (2nd) and countryman Ítalo Ferreira (1st). Also, due to these results combined with Filipe Toledo's (9th after withdrawing due to back pain), and in the Open Women's division Silvana Lima's (2nd), Tatiana Weston-Webb's (5th) and Tainá Hinckel's (25th), Brazil went on to win the gold medal, the first since the 2000 ISA games. Less than a week later, Medina captured his 14th CT event win, the third win at Kelly Slater's Surf Ranch (thus winning all three individual competitions ever had on this site at the time), in the Freshwater Pro, climbing the rankings and reaching the first position. Medina performed poorly during the European Leg and was eliminated in the Round of 16 in Quiksilver Pro France and MEO Rip Curl Pro Portugal. Medina caused controversy in the 2019 Billabong Pipe Masters by dropping in on his fellow competitor. This led to his actions being labelled unsportsmanlike. Medina finished the season in 2nd and lost the world title to fellow country man Ítalo Ferreira, with a runner-up finish to Ferreira at the Billabong Pipe Masters.

Medina was selected to represent his country in the 2020 Tokyo Olympics alongside 2019 WCT Champion Ítalo Ferreira. He finished the Olympics in fourth place, narrowly losing to Australia's Owen Wright in the bronze medal match.

In the 2021 season, Medina managed to clinch his 3rd world title in definitive fashion by winning 3 of the 8 tour events and placing runner-up in three events. The win saw Medina join Tom Curren, Andy Irons and Mick Fanning with three World Titles. With 16 WSL Championship Tour (CT) event wins and 29 final appearances under his belt, Medina is one of the most experienced surfers when it comes to producing the best surfing under pressure. Medina is 2nd only to Kelly Slater for the most World Titles among surfers currently on the CT.

In January 2022, Medina announced that he would take an indefinite leave from competitive surfing to focus on his mental health. In March, Medina underwent elective surgery to correct a deviated nasal septum. The procedure aimed to improve Medina's breathing, which has been an issue for him in competition. In April, Medina announced that he would be returning to the 2022 season after having missed the first 5 CT events and was awarded the men's 2022 WSL season wildcard, giving him entry into all CT events following the mid-season cut and made him eligible for the WSL Final 5 rankings and an opportunity to compete for the 2022 season title. He competed in his first 2022 season event at the Quiksilver Pro G-Land, where he placed 3rd. He also placed 3rd at his second event of the season at the El Salvador Pro. However, at his 3rd competitive event of the season at the Oi Rio Pro, Medina fell on his board and picked up an injury to his left knee, which ruled him out for the rest of the season.

On 3 March 2024, Medina won the men's final at the ISA World Surfing Games, which qualified him for the 2024 Olympic Games as Brazil's third competitor. During the Olympics, Medina had the highest single-wave score of the tournament with a 9.9, and a picture of his subsequent landing appearing to float in mid-air became viral. The semifinal against Jack Robinson had Medina eliminated only surfing one wave, as the Tahitian sea calmed down and did not offer another opportunity for him to score. Medina then beat Alonso Correa to get the bronze medal.

On 11 January 2025, Medina announced on his Instagram that he sustained a pectoral injury during a session in Maresias, Brazil, forcing Medina to withdraw from an unspecified number of events in the 2025 WSL Championship Tour. The World Surf League later confirmed that Medina withdrew from the first three events of the 2025 World Surf League Championship Tour in Hawaii, Abu Dhabi, and Portugal.

== Surfboards ==
Medina has been with his shaper, Johnny Cabianca, since 2008. Johnny Cabianca, a Brazilian living in the Basque Country, is one of the world's most renowned surfboard shapers. Medina uses about 100 surfboards a year, with a volume ranging from 28.5 to 29.1 litres. Cabianca, who previously shaped under the Spanish label Pukas, started his own brand in 2015. Medina's first victory on a Cabianca Surfboard was the Quiksilver Pro France 2015. Medina occasionally rides boards shaped by Wade Tokoro for Triple Crown events.

In addition to his competitive quiver, Medina launched his own line of user-friendly softboards entitled "Medina Softboards" in September 2020.

== Results ==
=== Victories ===
WSL Finals Wins
Year	Event	Venue	Country
2021	Rip Curl WSL Finals	Lower Trestles, California	United States

WCT Wins
Year	Event	Venue	Country
2026	Philippines Pro	Cloud 9, Siargao Island, Philippines	Philippines
2023	Margaret River Pro	Margaret River, Western Australia	Australia
2021	Rip Curl Rottnest Search presented by Corona	Rottnest Island, Western Australia	Australia
2021	Rip Curl Narrabeen Classic presented by Corona	Narrabeen, New South Wales	Australia
2019	Freshwater Pro	Lemoore, California	United States
2019	Corona Open J-Bay	Jeffreys Bay, Eastern Cap	South Africa
2018	Billabong Pipeline Masters	Banzai Pipeline, Oahu	Hawaii
2018	Surf Ranch Pro	Lemoore, California	United States
2018	Tahiti Pro Teahupo'o	Teahupo'o, Tahiti	French Polynesia
2017	MEO Rip Curl Pro Portugal	Supertubos, Peniche	Portugal
2017	Quiksilver Pro France	Hossegor, Nouvelle-Aquitaine	France
2016	Fiji Pro	Namotu, Tavarua	Fiji
2015	Quiksilver Pro France	Hossegor, Nouvelle-Aquitaine	France
2014	Billabong Pro Teahupoo	Teahupo'o, Tahiti	French Polynesia
2014	Fiji Pro	Namotu, Tavarua	Fiji
2014	Quiksilver Pro Gold Coast	Gold Coast, Queensland	Australia
2011	Rip Curl Search	San Francisco, California	United States
2011	Quiksilver Pro France	Hossegor, Nouvelle-Aquitaine	France
WSL Challenger Series Wins
Year	Event	Venue	Country
2022	Corona Saquarema Pro	Saquarema, Rio de Janeiro	Brazil
World Qualifying Series
Year	Event	Venue	Country
2012	Nike Lowers Pro	San Clemente, California	United States
2011	Super Surf International	Imbituba	Brazil
2011	Sooruz Lacanau Pro	Lacanau	France
2011	San Miguel Pro	Zarautz, Basque Country	Spain
2009	Maresias Surf International	Florianópolis, Santa Catarina	Brazil
Juniors Tour
Year	Event	Venue	Country
2013	HD World Junior Championship	Florianópolis	Brazil
2011	Airwalk Lacanau Pro Junior	Lacanau	France
Special Events
Year	Event	Venue	Country
2017	Future Classic	Lemoore, California	United States

=== WSL World Championship Tour ===
Tournament	2011	2012	2013	2014	2015	2016	2017	2018	2019	2021	2022	2023	2024
Quiksilver Pro Gold Coast	DNP	25th	13th	1st	13th	13th	3rd	13th	5th	-	-	-	-
Rip Curl Pro Bells Beach	25th	13th	13th	9th	5th	13th	13th	3rd	5th	-	DNP	9th	17th
Margaret River Pro	-	-	-	5th	25th	9th	25th	5th	17th	9th	DNP	1st	9th
Oi Rio Pro	DNP	25th	3rd	13th	13th	3rd	9th	5th	5th	-	17	17th	5th
Corona Bali Protected	-	-	13th	-	-	-	-	9th	17th	-	-	-	-
Corona Open J-Bay	DNP	-	-	5th	5th	5th	3rd	5th	1st	-	DNP	3rd	-
Billabong Pro Teahupoo	DNP	5th	13th	1st	2nd	3rd	2nd	1st	2nd	-	DNP	2nd	3rd
Surf Ranch Open	-	-	-	-	-	-	-	1st	1st	2nd	-	5th	-
Quiksilver Pro France	1st	5th	2nd	5th	1st	2nd	1st	3rd	13th	-	-	-	-
MEO Rip Curl Pro Portugal	13th	2nd	25th	13th	5th	13th	1st	3rd	9th	-	DNP	9th	3rd
Billabong Pipeline Masters	5th	9th	13th	2nd	2nd	13th	5th	1st	2nd	2nd	DNP	9th	17th
Rip Curl Search	1st	-	-	-	-	-	-	-	-	-	-	-	-
O'Neill Coldwater Classic	-	5th	-	-	-	-	-	-	-	-	-	-	-
Fiji Pro	-	2nd	25th	1st	13th	1st	13th	-	-	-	-	-	
Hurley Pro at Trestles	13th	9th	13th	5th	3rd	13th	13th	-	-	-	-	-	-
Rip Curl Newcastle Cup	-	-	-	-	-	-	-	-	-	2nd	-	-	-
Rip Curl Narrabeen Classic	-	-	-	-	-	-	-	-	-	1st	-	-	-
Rip Curl Rottnest Search presented by Corona	-	-	-	-	-	-	-	-	-	1st	-	-	-
Corona Open Mexico presented by Quiksilver	-	-	-	-	-	-	-	-	-	5th	-	-	-
Rip Curl WSL Finals	-	-	-	-	-	-	-	-	-	1st	-	-	
Hurley Pro Sunset Beach	-	-	-	-	-	-	-	-	-	-	DNP	9th	17th
Quiksilver Pro G-Land	-	-	-	-	-	-	-	-	-	-	3rd	-	-
Surf City El Salvador Pro	-	-	-	-	-	-	-	-	-	-	3rd	9th	3rd
Rank	12th	7th	14th	1st	3rd	3rd	2nd	1st	2nd	1st	24th	6th	
Earnings	$180,750	$146,750	$120,000	$431,500	$335,500	$281,750	$374,750	$473,200	$330,000				

== Filmography ==
Acting

- Luiza Possi: Lembra (2017)
- Surf Chronicles (2011)

Self

- Tempestade Perfeita (2021)
- É Ouro! O Brilho do Brasil em Tóquio (2021)
- World Debut (2021)
- Gabriel Medina (2020)
- WSL Men's Championship Tour (2019)
- Mundo Medina (2019)
- WSL World Surf League (2018)
- No Contest (2018)
- WSL Men's Championship Tour (2018)
- Rip Curl's The Search (2014–2017)
- WSL Men's Championship Tour (2016)
- Vai Fernandinha (2016)
- Samsung: Surf – The Snail (2016)
- WSL Men's Championship Tour (2015)
- Xuxa Meneghel (2015)
- Today (2014)
- ASP Men's Championship Tour (2014)
- ASP World Surf Tour (2014)
- Diário das Ilhas (2012)
- Noronha Prime (2012)

Achievements
Preceded by Mick Fanning	World Surf League World Champion (men's); 2014	Succeeded by Adriano De Souza
Preceded by John John Florence	World Surf League World Champion (men's); 2018	Succeeded by Italo Ferreira
