= 2017 World Surf League =

Professional surfing league season

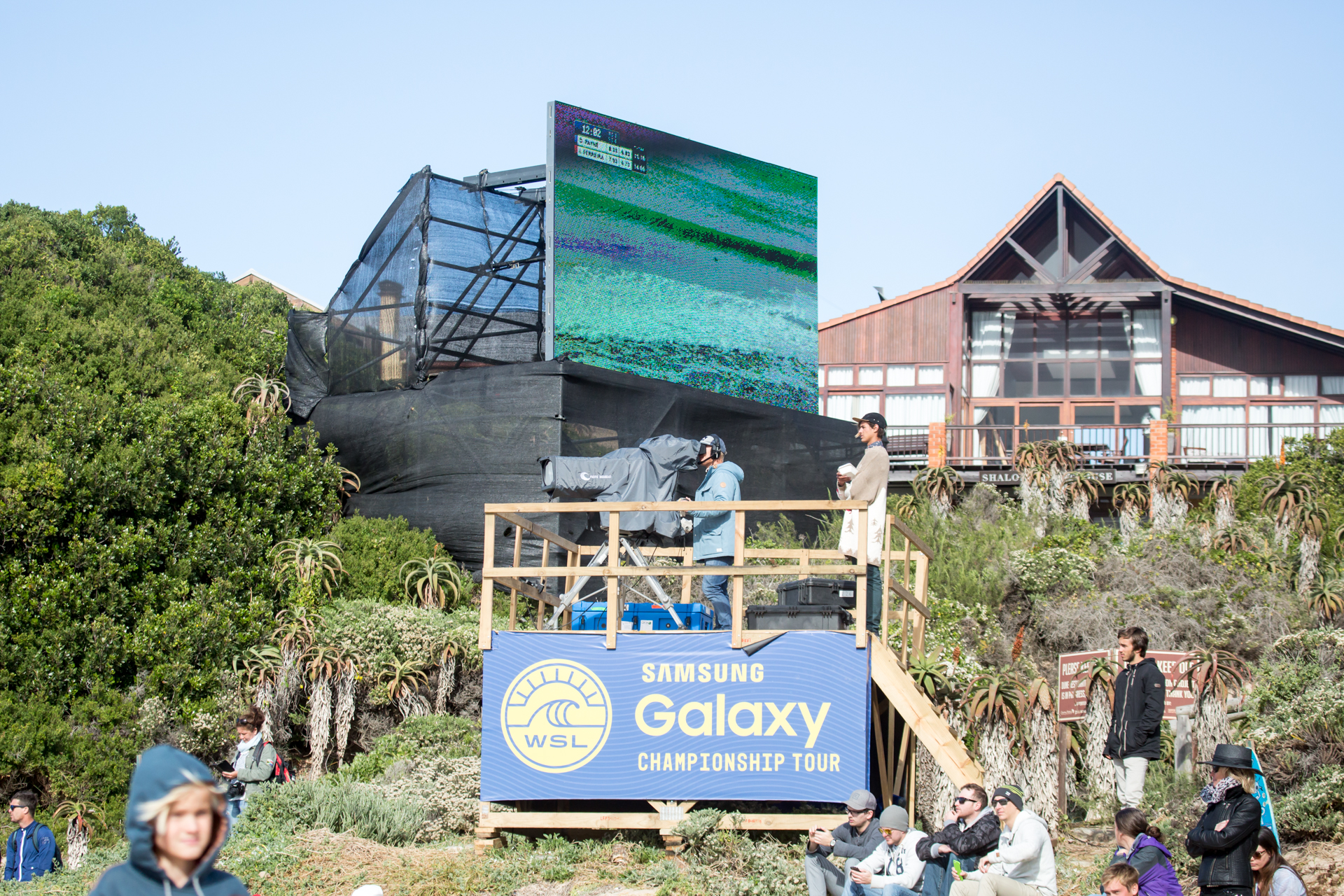
- Location: International
- Dates: late February to mid-December 2017

Champions
- Men: (Hawaii) John John Florence
- Women: (Australia) Tyler Wright

The 2017 World Surf League Championship Tour (CT) is a professional competitive surfing league run by the World Surf League. Men and women compete in separate tours with events taking place from late February to mid-December, at various surfing locations around the world.

Surfers receive points for their best events. The surfer with the most points at the end of the tour (after discarding their two worst results) is announced the 2017 World Surf League Champion.

== 2017 Men's Championship Tour ==
=== Event results ===
Round	Event	Men's champion	Men's runner-up
1	(Australia) Quiksilver Pro Gold Coast	(Australia) Owen Wright	(Australia) Matt Wilkinson
2	(Australia) Drug Aware Margaret River Pro	(Hawaii) John John Florence	(United States) Kolohe Andino
3	(Australia) Rip Curl Pro Bells Beach	(South Africa) Jordy Smith	(Brazil) Caio Ibelli
4	(Brazil) Oi Rio Pro	(Brazil) Adriano de Souza	(Australia) Adrian Buchan
5	Outerknown Fiji Pro	(Australia) Matt Wilkinson	(Australia) Connor O'Leary
6	(South Africa) Corona Open J-Bay	(Brazil) Filipe Toledo	(Portugal) Frederico Morais
7	(French Polynesia) Billabong Pro Tahiti	(Australia) Julian Wilson	(Brazil) Gabriel Medina
8	(United States) Hurley Pro at Trestles	(Brazil) Filipe Toledo	(South Africa) Jordy Smith
9	Quiksilver Pro France	(Brazil) Gabriel Medina	(Hawaii) Sebastian Zietz
10	MEO Rip Curl Pro Portugal	(Brazil) Gabriel Medina	(Australia) Julian Wilson
11	(Hawaii) Billabong Pipe Masters	(France) Jérémy Florès	(Hawaii) John John Florence

=== 2017 Men's Championship Tour Jeep Leaderboard ===
Points are awarded using the following structure:

Position	1st	2nd	3rd	5th	9th	13th	25th	INJ	DNC
Points	10,000	8,000	6,500	5,200	4,000	1,750	500	500	0

Ranking	+/-	Surfer	(Australia) WCT 1 (Details)	(Australia) WCT 2 (Details)	(Australia) WCT 3 (Details)	(Brazil) WCT 4 (Details)	(Fiji) WCT 5 (Details)	(South Africa) WCT 6 (Details)	(French Polynesia) WCT 7 (Details)	(United States) WCT 8 (Details)	(France) WCT 9 (Details)	(Portugal) WCT 10 (Details)	(Hawaii) WCT 11 (Details)	Points
1	Steady	John John Florence (HAW)	3rd	1st	3rd	13th	13th	5th	5th	3rd	3rd	5th	2nd	59.600
2	Steady	Gabriel Medina (BRA)	3rd	25th	13th	9th	13th	3rd	2nd	13th	1st	1st	5th	53.700
3	Steady	Julian Wilson (AUS)	13th	9th	13th	9th	5th	3rd	1st	9th	25th	2nd	5th	48.650
4	Steady	Jordy Smith (ZAF)	9th	5th	1st	5th	13th	5th	3rd	2nd	13th	13th	13th	47.600
5	Steady	Matt Wilkinson (AUS)	2nd	25th	13th	3rd	1st	5th	9th	25th	13th	13th	13th	40.700
6	Steady	Owen Wright (AUS)	1st	5th	9th	5th	13th	9th	5th	25th	9th	25th	25th	39.850
7	Steady	Kolohe Andino (USA)	9th	2nd	13th	25th	13th	25th	3rd	25th	3rd	3rd	13th	37.250
8	Steady	Adriano de Souza (BRA)	9th	5th	5th	1st	13th	13th	13th	5th	13th	13th	13th	36.600
9	Steady	Joel Parkinson (AUS)	5th	13th	9th	5th	3rd	13th	13th	25th	5th	13th	5th	36.550
10	Steady	Filipe Toledo (BRA)	25th	3rd	5th	13th	DNC	1st	25th	1st	25th	25th	25th	35.450
11	Steady	Sebastian Zietz (HAW)	13th	9th	9th	13th	9th	25th	13th	9th	2nd	5th	25th	34.450
12	Steady	Mick Fanning (AUS)	13th	25th	5th	5th	13th	5th	13th	13th	5th	5th	13th	33.000
13	Steady	Connor O'Leary (AUS)	5th	13th	13th	13th	2nd	13th	9th	25th	25th	9th	13th	29.950
14	Steady	Frederico Morais (PRT)	13th	25th	5th	13th	13th	2nd	25th	5th	13th	9th	25th	29.900
15	Steady	Jérémy Florès (FRA)	13th	9th	13th	13th	13th	13th	13th	5th	13th	25th	1st	29.700
16	Steady	Adrian Buchan (AUS)	25th	13th	13th	2nd	25th	25th	9th	3rd	13th	13th	13th	27.750
17	Steady	Kanoa Igarashi (USA)	25th	13th	25th	9th	25th	25th	13th	5th	25th	3rd	3rd	27.200
18	Steady	Caio Ibelli (BRA)	13th	13th	2nd	13th	INJ	13th	25th	25th	9th	13th	9th	25.250
19	Steady	Michel Bourez (PYF)	25th	5th	13th	25th	3rd	9th	13th	25th	13th	13th	13th	24.950
20	Steady	Conner Coffin (USA)	9th	9th	25th	25th	25th	9th	9th	13th	25th	13th	9th	24.500
21	Steady	Joan Duru (FRA)	25th	25th	13th	25th	5th	9th	5th	13th	9th	25th	25th	23.400
22	Steady	Italo Ferreira (BRA)	5th	INJ	INJ	INJ	9th	13th	13th	13th	25th	13th	5th	22.400
23	Steady	Ian Gouveia (BRA)	13th	13th	25th	13th	9th	25th	13th	25th	13th	25th	3rd	20.250
24	Steady	Bede Durbidge (AUS)	25th	13th	13th	13th	5th	13th	13th	9th	13th	25th	25th	20.200
25	Steady	Miguel Pupo (BRA)	13th	13th	25th	25th	13th	25th	25th	13th	5th	5th	13th	20.150
26	Steady	Wiggolly Dantas (BRA)	25th	25th	9th	9th	13th	25th	5th	13th	25th	25th	25th	18.700
26	Steady	Leonardo Fioravanti (ITA)	25th	25th	25th	25th	5th	13th	25th	25th	13th	9th	9th	18.700
28	Steady	Kelly Slater (USA)	5th	13th	13th	INJ	13th	13th	INJ	INJ	INJ	INJ	9th	17.700
29	Steady	Ezekiel Lau (HAW)	13th	25th	3rd	25th	25th	13th	25th	13th	25th	25th	13th	15.500
30	Steady	Jack Freestone (AUS)	25th	3rd	25th	25th	25th	13th	25th	25th	25th	13th	25th	13.000
30	Steady	Nat Young (USA)	25th	13th	13th	13th	25th	–	13th	25th	9th	25th	–	13.000
32	Steady	Jadson André (BRA)	13th	25th	25th	13th	25th	13th	25th	9th	25th	25th	25th	11.750
32	Steady	Josh Kerr (AUS)	25th	25th	25th	13th	25th	25th	25th	13th	25th	9th	13th	11.750
34	Steady	Ethan Ewing (AUS)	25th	25th	25th	25th	25th	25th	13th	13th	13th	13th	13th	10.750
35	Steady	Stuart Kennedy (AUS)	13th	25th	25th	25th	9th	25th	25th	25th	13th	25th	25th	10.500
36	Steady	Yago Dora (BRA)	–	–	–	3rd	25th	–	–	–	–	–	–	7.000
37	Steady	Marc Lacomare (FRA)	–	–	–	–	–	–	–	–	5th	–	–	5.200
38	Steady	Jesse Mendes (BRA)	–	13th	–	25th	–	–	–	–	–	–	–	2.250
39	Steady	Mikey Wright (AUS)	13th	–	–	–	–	–	–	–	–	–	–	1.750
39	Steady	Jacob Willcox (AUS)	–	13th	–	–	–	–	–	–	–	–	–	1.750
39	Steady	Hiroto Ohhara (JPN)	–	–	–	–	–	–	–	13th	–	–	–	1.750
39	Steady	Evan Geiselman (USA)	–	–	–	–	–	–	–	13th	–	–	–	1.750
39	Steady	Vasco Ribeiro (POR)	–	–	–	–	–	–	–	–	–	13th	–	1.750
44	Steady	Bino Lopes (BRA)	–	–	–	25th	25th	–	–	–	–	–	–	1.000
45	Steady	Samuel Pupo (BRA)	–	–	25th	–	–	–	–	–	–	–	–	500
45	Steady	Glyndyn Ringrose (AUS)	–	–	25th	–	–	–	–	–	–	–	–	500
45	Steady	Tevita Gukilau (FJI)	–	–	–	–	25th	–	–	–	–	–	–	500
45	Steady	Michael February (ZAF)	–	–	–	–	–	25th	–	–	–	–	–	500
45	Steady	Dale Staples (ZAF)	–	–	–	–	–	25th	–	–	–	–	–	500
45	Steady	Aritz Aranburu (ESP)	–	–	–	–	–	–	25th	–	–	–	–	500
45	Steady	Taumata Puhetini (PYF)	–	–	–	–	–	–	25th	–	–	–	–	500
45	Steady	Keanu Asing (HAW)	–	–	–	–	–	–	–	–	25th	–	–	500
45	Steady	Mason Ho (HAW)	–	–	–	–	–	–	–	–	–	25th	–	500
45	Steady	Dusty Payne (HAW)	–	–	–	–	–	–	–	–	–	–	25th	500
45	Steady	Benji Brand (HAW)	–	–	–	–	–	–	–	–	–	–	25th	500

- Championship Tour surfers best 9 of 11 results are combined to equal their final point total
- Two Worst event results are omitted from the final point total

Legend

Champion
Men's QS 2018
Two worst results

== 2017 Women's Championship Tour ==
=== Event results ===
Round	Event	Men's champion	Men's runner-up
1	(Australia) Roxy Pro Gold Coast	(Australia) Stephanie Gilmore	(United States) Lakey Peterson
2	(Australia) Drug Aware Margaret River Pro – Women's	(Australia) Sally Fitzgibbons	(Australia) Tyler Wright
3	(Australia) Rip Curl Women's Pro Bells Beach	(United States) Courtney Conlogue	(Australia) Stephanie Gilmore
4	(Brazil) Oi Rio Women's Pro	(Australia) Tyler Wright	(France) Johanne Defay
5	Outerknown Fiji Women's Pro	(United States) Courtney Conlogue	(Hawaii) Tatiana Weston-Webb
6	(United States) Vans US Open of Surfing – Women's CT	(United States) Sage Erickson	(Hawaii) Tatiana Weston-Webb
7	(United States) Swatch Pro at Trestles	(Brazil) Silvana Lima	(Australia) Keely Andrew
8	(Portugal) Cascais Women's Pro	(Australia) Nikki Van Dijk	(Hawaii) Carissa Moore
9	Roxy Pro France	(Hawaii) Carissa Moore	(United States) Lakey Peterson
10	(Hawaii) Maui Women's Pro	(Australia) Stephanie Gilmore	(Hawaii) Malia Manuel

=== 2017 Women's Championship Tour Jeep Leaderboard ===
Points are awarded using the following structure:

Position	1st	2nd	3rd	5th	9th	13th	INJ	DNC
Points	10,000	8,000	6,500	5,200	3,300	1,750	1,750	0

Ranking	+/-	Surfer	(Australia) WCT 1 (Details)	(Australia) WCT 2 (Details)	(Australia) WCT 3 (Details)	(Brazil) WCT 4 (Details)	(Fiji) WCT 5 (Details)	(United States) WCT 6 (Details)	(United States) WCT 7 (Details)	(Portugal) WCT 8 (Details)	(France) WCT 9 (Details)	(Hawaii) WCT 10 (Details)	Points
1	Steady	Tyler Wright (AUS)	5th	2nd	3rd	1st	3rd	5th	9th	13th	3rd	3rd	54.400
2	Steady	Stephanie Gilmore (AUS)	1st	3rd	2nd	5th	9th	13th	5th	13th	5th	1st	53.400
3	Steady	Sally Fitzgibbons (AUS)	3rd	1st	5th	3rd	3rd	5th	5th	3rd	3rd	13th	52.900
4	Steady	Courtney Conlogue (USA)	9th	5th	1st	9th	1st	3rd	3rd	9th	5th	9th	50.000
5	Steady	Carissa Moore (HAW)	5th	5th	5th	13th	5th	9th	5th	2nd	1st	5th	49.200
6	Steady	Lakey Peterson (USA)	2nd	13th	3rd	9th	9th	13th	3rd	5th	2nd	9th	44.100
7	Steady	Nikki Van Dijk (AUS)	5th	5th	9th	3rd	5th	9th	9th	1st	13th	5th	43.900
8	Steady	Sage Erickson (USA)	13th	3rd	9th	5th	5th	1st	5th	5th	13th	13th	42.350
9	Steady	Johanne Defay (FRA)	3rd	9th	5th	2nd	5th	5th	9th	13th	9th	13th	40.000
10	Steady	Tatiana Weston-Webb (HAW)	9th	9th	9th	13th	2nd	2nd	13th	5th	13th	9th	36.150
11	Steady	Keely Andrew (AUS)	5th	9th	13th	5th	9th	13th	2nd	5th	9th	13th	35.250
12	Steady	Silvana Lima (BRA)	13th	13th	9th	13th	13th	9th	1st	9th	9th	5th	31.900
12	Steady	Malia Manuel (HAW)	13th	5th	INJ	INJ	INJ	INJ	13th	3rd	5th	2nd	31.900
14	Steady	Coco Ho (HAW)	9th	9th	5th	9th	13th	3rd	13th	13th	13th	9th	28.400
15	Steady	Bronte Macaulay (AUS)	9th	13th	13th	13th	13th	13th	13th	13th	9th	3rd	21.850
16	Steady	Pauline Ado (FRA)	13th	13th	13th	13th	13th	5th	9th	13th	13th	13th	19.000
17	Steady	Bianca Buitendag (ZAF)	–	13th	–	5th	13th	13th	–	9th	5th	–	18.950
18	Steady	Laura Enever (AUS)	13th	INJ	13th	9th	13th	13th	13th	INJ	INJ	13th	15.550
19	Steady	Brisa Hennessy (CRC)	–	–	–	–	–	–	–	–	–	5th	5.200
20	Steady	Bethany Hamilton (HAW)	–	–	–	–	9th	–	–	–	–	–	3.300
20	Steady	Maud Le Car (FRA)	–	–	–	–	–	9th	–	–	–	–	3.300
20	Steady	Teresa Bonvalot (PRT)	–	–	–	–	–	–	–	9th	–	–	3.300
23	Steady	Alyssa Lock (AUS)	13th	–	–	–	–	–	–	–	–	–	1.750
23	Steady	Laura Macaulay (AUS)	–	13th	–	–	–	–	–	–	–	–	1.750
23	Steady	Ella Williams (NZL)	–	–	13th	–	–	–	–	–	–	–	1.750
23	Steady	Isabella Nichols (AUS)	–	–	13th	–	–	–	–	–	–	–	1.750
23	Steady	Taina Hinckel (BRA)	–	–	–	13th	–	–	–	–	–	–	1.750
23	Steady	Macy Callaghan (AUS)	–	–	–	–	–	–	13th	–	–	–	1.750
23	Steady	Caroline Marks (USA)	–	–	–	–	–	–	–	–	13th	–	1.750

- Championship Tour surfers best 8 of 10 results are combined to equal their final point total.
- Tournament results discarded

Legend

Champion
Women's QS 2018
two worst results

== Qualifying Series ==
=== Men's Qualifying Series ===
Position	1st	2nd	3rd–4th	5th–8th	9th

Ranking	+/-	Surfer	Events					Points
Ranking	+/-	Surfer	1	2	3	4	5	Points
1	Steady	Griffin Colapinto (USA)	8.000	6.300	5.200	3.700	3.700	26.900
2	Steady	Jesse Mendes (BRA)	6.000	6.000	5.200	4.500	3.700	25.400
3	Steady	Kanoa Igarashi (USA)	10.000	6.500	2.650	2.300	1.580	23.030
4	Steady	Wade Carmichael (AUS)	6.700	5.200	3.700	3.550	2.250	21.400
5	Steady	Tomas Hermes (BRA)	8.000	5.300	3.700	2.200	1.680	20.880
6	Steady	Yago Dora (BRA)	6.000	6.000	3.700	2.650	2.300	20.650
7	Steady	Italo Ferreira (BRA)	8.000	3.800	3.700	3.600	1.260	20.360
8	Steady	Willian Cardoso (BRA)	8.000	5.200	2.650	2.100	1.050	19.000
9	Steady	Keanu Asing (HAW)	3.700	3.700	3.550	3.000	3.000	16.950
10	Steady	Ezekiel Lau (HAW)	10.000	3.000	1.550	1.100	1.100	16.750
11	Steady	Michael Rodrigues (BRA)	4.500	4.500	3.700	2.300	1.550	16.550
12	Steady	Filipe Toledo (BRA)	10.000	6.500				16.500
13	Steady	Patrick Gudauskas (USA)	5.200	5.100	2.300	2.250	1.550	16.400
14	Steady	Michael February (ZAF)	6.500	5.200	2.300	1.050	1.000	16.050
15	Steady	Jordy Smith (ZAF)	10.000	5.100	–	–	–	15.100

Legend

Men's CT 2018

=== Women's Qualifying Series ===
Position	1st	2nd	3rd–4th	5th–8th	9th

Ranking	+/-	Surfer	Events					Points
Ranking	+/-	Surfer	1	2	3	4	5	Points
1	Steady	Johanne Defay (FRA)	6.000	6.000	4.500	700	–	17.200
2	Steady	Tatiana Weston-Webb (HAW)	3.550	4.500	2.650	2.650	2.650	16.000
3	Steady	Silvana Lima (BRA)	6.000	3.550	2.650	1.550	1.550	15.300
4	Steady	Bronte Macaulay (AUS)	4.500	3.550	2.650	2.650	1.550	14.900
5	Steady	Coco Ho (HAW)	6.000	3.000	2.650	1.550	1.500	14.700
6	Steady	Sage Erickson (USA)	4.500	3.550	3.550	1.050	1.050	13.700
7	Steady	Caroline Marks (USA)	3.550	4.500	2.650	1.680	1.050	13.430
8	Steady	Keely Andrew (AUS)	3.550	2.650	2.650	2.650	1.550	13.050
9	Steady	Paige Hareb (NZL)	4.500	2.650	2.650	1.260	1.050	12.110
10	Steady	Macy Callaghan (AUS)	3.550	3.550	1.680	1.550	1.550	11.880

Legend

Women's CT 2018
