= Lyndall Jarvis =

South African model and television presenter

- Born: Lyndall Jarvis; October 27, 1983 (age 42); Cape Town, South Africa
- Spouse: Jordy Smith
- Modeling information
- Height: 5 ft 10 in (1.78 m)
- Hair color: Blonde
- Eye color: Blue

Lyndall Jarvis is a South African model and television presenter. Born and raised in Cape Town, she is the daughter of an English mother and a South African father. She started modelling at the age of 5. In 2009, FHM South Africa named her as their Sexiest Woman of the Year. She provided the likeness of the enemy character Laughing Octopus in the 2008 video game Metal Gear Solid 4: Guns of the Patriots.

In 2014, Jarvis married South African professional surfer Jordy Smith.
