= Maud Le Car =

Maud Le Car is a professional surfer and model.

== Early life ==
She was born in Saint Martin in the French Caribbean on 1992.

== Career ==
She is currently ranked 23 as in QS and resides in Capbreton. In 2015, she was ranked 15 in the world. In 2016, she won two events of World Surf League held in California and Israel.
