= Maresias =

Beach in Brazil

Coordinates: 23°47′29″S 45°34′16″W

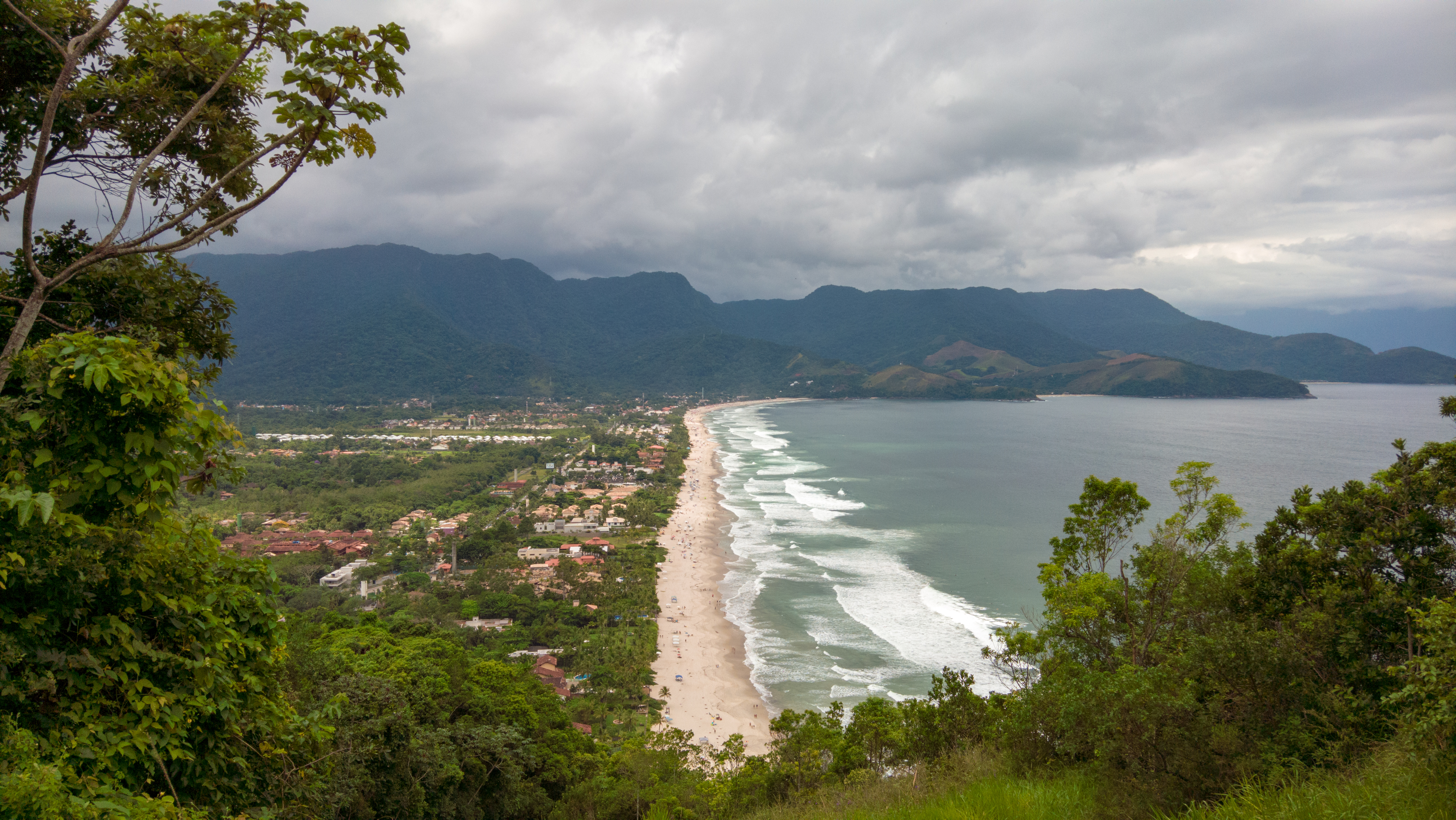
Maresias

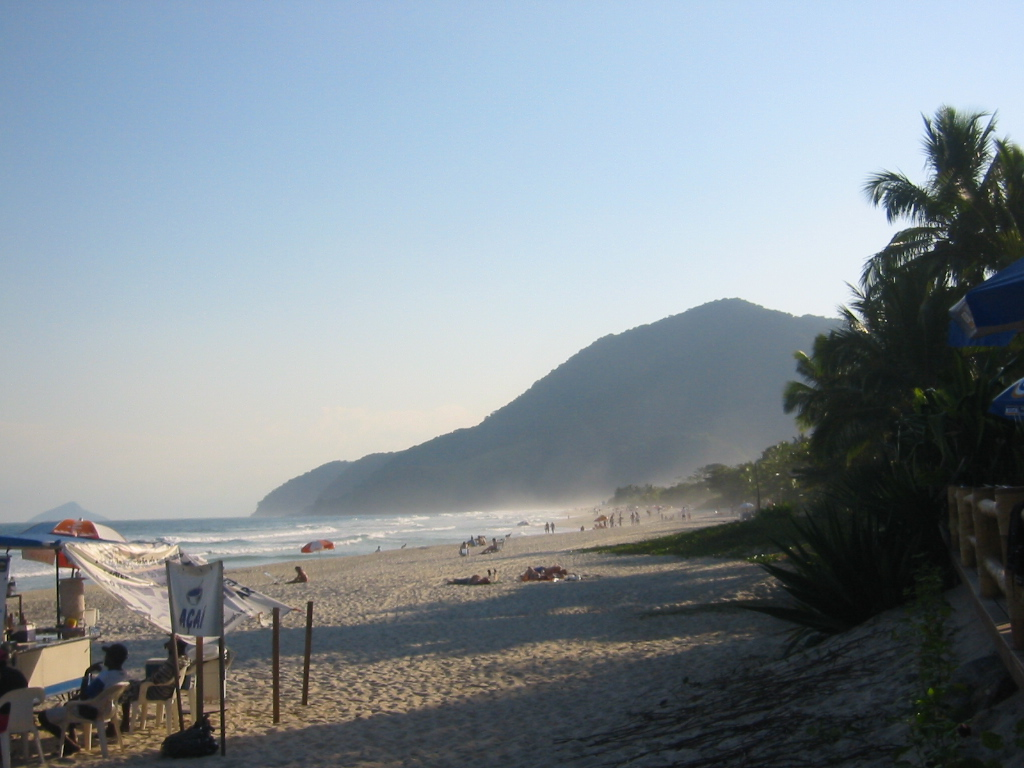
Maresias beach

Maresias is a beach and district at the Atlantic Ocean in the city of São Sebastião, located on São Paulo state's northern coastline, Brazil. The name comes from the ocean breeze that affects the beach and the neighborhood.

The sea at the beach is shaken with big waves and the current is also strong, being one of the most popular surf points in Brazil, serving as a point for some tournaments. The sand is yellowish and soft with 5 kilometers in length. The neighborhood beside the beach attracts many tourists for its variety of restaurants and shops, especially young people, because of its night clubs. There are also programmed walks in the Atlantic Forest.

The beach was discovered in 1974 by surfers who started to explore the beaches north beyond Guarujá.

== Notable people ==
- Gabriel Medina (1993-), surfer
