= Jay Davies =

English footballer

Personal information
- Full name: Jay Andrew John Raymond Davies
- Date of birth: 26 December 1991 (age 34)
- Place of birth: Dagenham, England
- Height: 1.70 m (5 ft 7 in)
- Position: Midfielder

Team information
- Current team: Bentleigh Greens SC
- Number: 8

Youth career
- –2010: Peterborough United

Senior career*
Years	Team	Apps	(Gls)
2010–2011	Peterborough United	0	(0)
2011	→ Woking (loan)	11	(0)
2011	Farnborough	8	(0)
2011–2012	Woking	25	(1)
2012–2015	St Neots Town		
2015	Bishop's Stortford		
2015	Biggleswade Town		
2016–2021	Green Gully	88	(9)
2022–2023	Sydenham Park		
2023	Dandenong Thunder	7	(1)
2024–	Bentleigh Greens SC	16	(0)
- * Club domestic league appearances and goals as of 02:00, 14 June 2024 (UTC)

Jay Andrew John Raymond Davies is an English footballer who plays for Bentleigh Greens SC as a midfielder.
