= Filipe Toledo =

Brazilian surfer

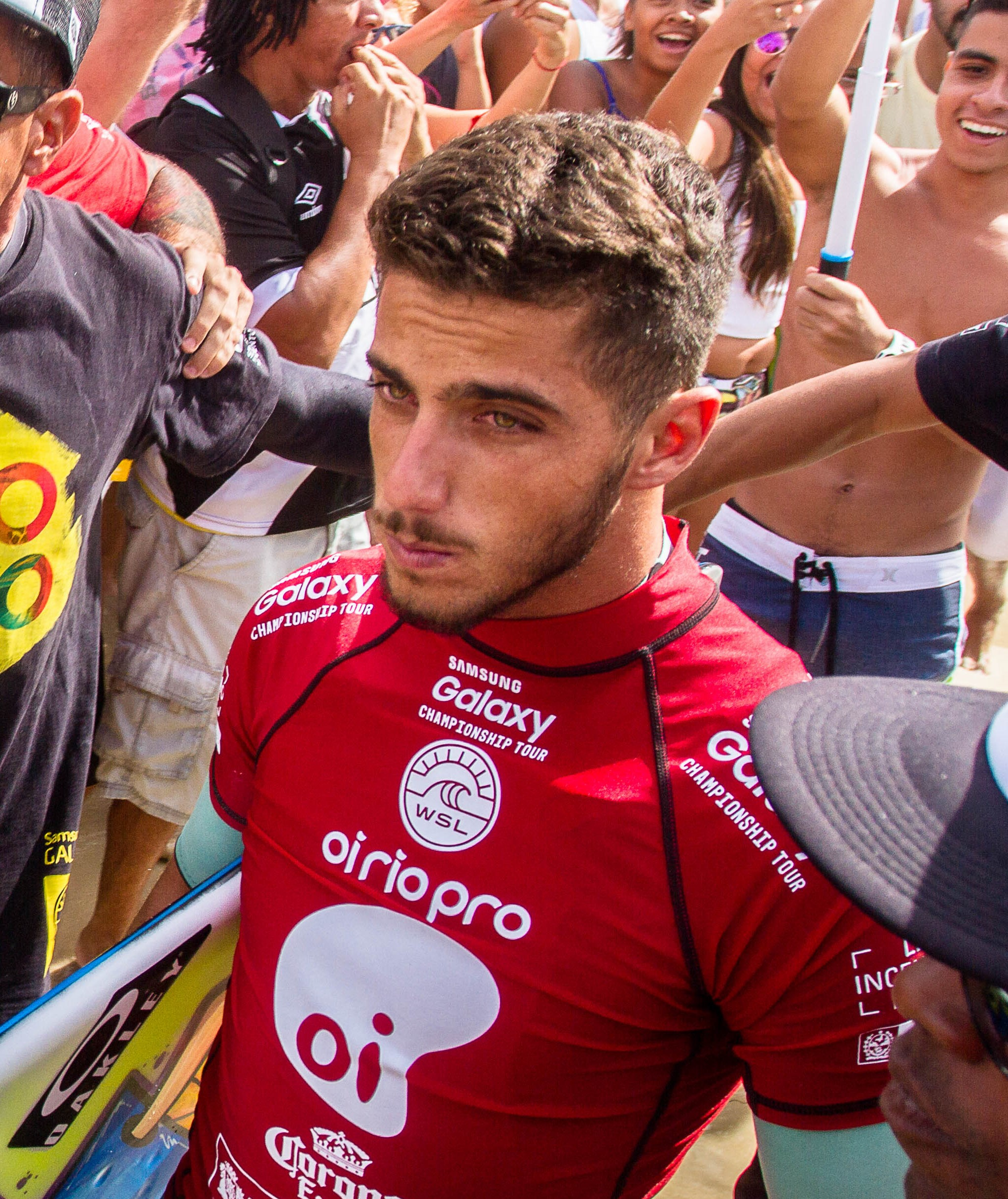
- Toledo at the Oi Rio Pro in 2015

Personal information
- Born: 16 April 1995 (age 31) Ubatuba, São Paulo, Brazil
- Height: 5 ft 9 in (175 cm)
- Weight: 154 lb (70 kg)

Surfing career
- Sport: Surfing
- Best year: 1st: 2022, 2023 - WSL World Champion
- Sponsors: Hurley, Monster Energy, Oakley, Corona, FCS traction and fins
- Major achievements: 2x World Champion (2022, 2023); WSL Championship Tour event wins: 18; 2014 World Qualifying Series Champion; 2x US Open of Surfing champion (2014, 2016)

Surfing specifications
- Stance: Regular (natural foot)
Medal record
Men's surfing
Representing Brazil
World Games
Gold medal – first place	2019 Miyazaki	Team
Gold medal – first place	2024 Arecibo	Team
Bronze medal – third place	2023 La Bocana	Team

Filipe Toledo (born 16 April 1995) is a Brazilian professional surfer who has competed on the World Surf League Men's World Tour since 2013. He is a second-generation pro who grew up outside of Ubatuba, Brazil, on the northeastern coast of the state of São Paulo. His father, and long-time coach, Ricardo, was a two-time national champion. In 2014, as his career took flight, Filipe convinced his entire family to move to San Clemente, California.

Toledo won the World Surf League championship in 2022 and 2023. He qualified for the 2024 Olympic Games.

== Surfing career ==
In 2014, after also competing in some events on the Qualifying Series (WQS), Toledo became the WQS champion. In 2015, Toledo had one of the best year of his professional career on the WSL World Championship Tour (CT), managing to grab his first 3 CT event wins and getting at least one perfect 10 in each final he competed in. Toledo was also the surfer with most CT event wins of the year and went on to finish the 2015 season in 4th place. In 2016, Toledo suffered a string of injuries which caused him to miss 2 CT events. He went on to finish the 2016 season in 10th place. In 2017, Toledo won the J-Bay Open and the Hurly Pro at Trestles. However inconsistent result at other events saw him finish the 2017 season in 10th place. In 2018, Toledo won the J-Bay Open for the 2nd year in a row as well as the Rio Pro. He also went onto to finish the 2018 season in 3rd place, which was at the time his best season ending ranking. In 2019, Toledo won the Rio Pro for the 2nd year in a row and made 2 finals appearances at the Rip Curl Pro and Surf Ranch Pro. He finished the 2019 season in 4th place. In the 2021 season, Toledo won 2 CT events and finishing 2nd overall, after a runner-up finish to Gabriel Medina at the inaugural WSL Finals. In the 2022 season, Toledo won his first ever Championship Tour, placing 1st place and beating fellow Brazilian surfer, Italo Ferreira at the RIP Curl WSL finals. Most recently, in the 2023 World Surf League Championship Tour finals, Toledo won the competition for the second time, bringing down the Australian Ethan Ewing. On February 12, 2024, following an early elimination from the Lexus Pipe Pro, Toledo announced that he would be taking a 1-year break from the tour to focus on his mental health and not competing in any of the remaining events on the 2024 calendar.

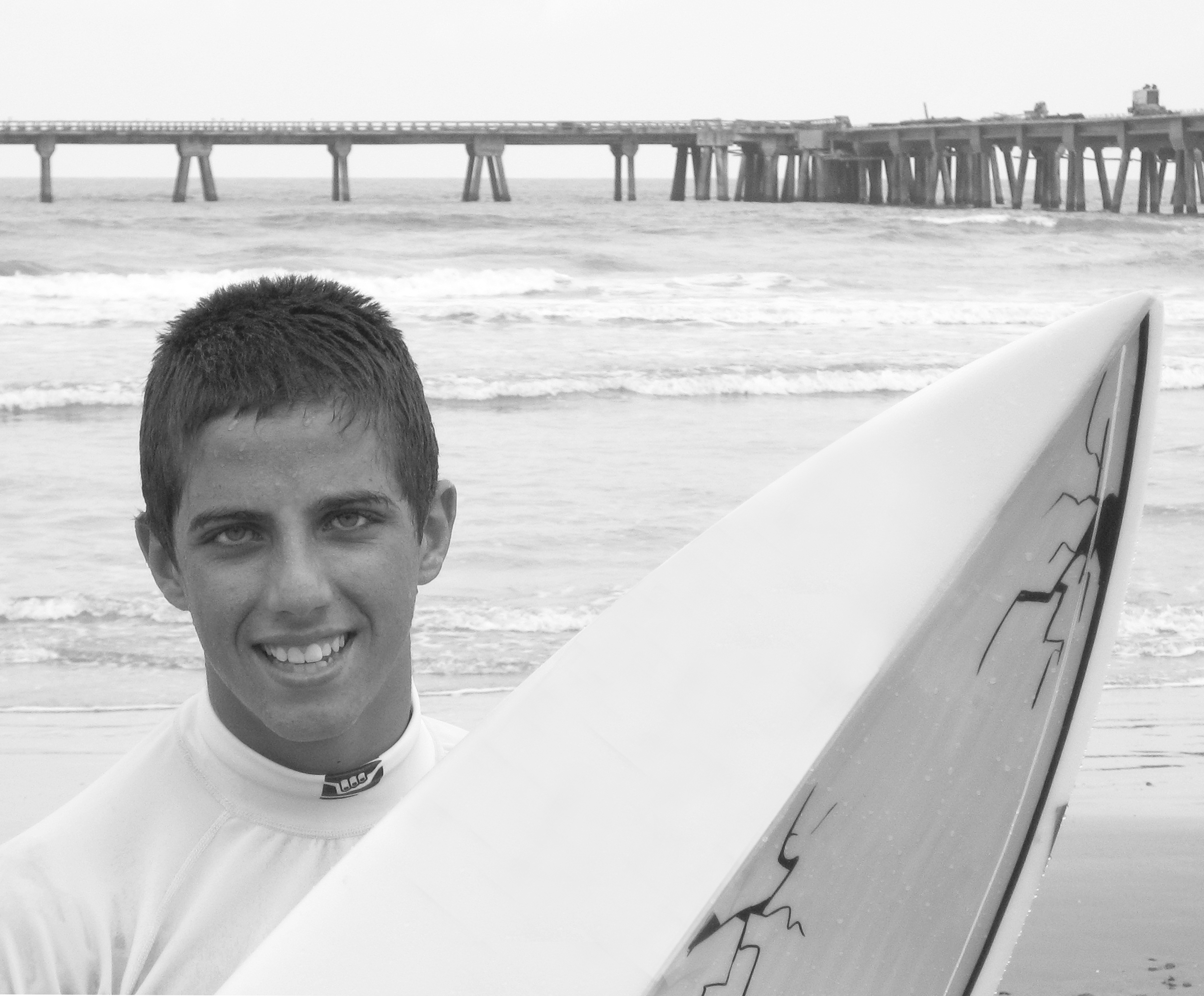
Filipe Toledo in Mongaguá, Brazil 2010.

For his whole professional career, Filipe Toledo has represented the tip of the spear of the progressive surfing movement. Small in stature, but massive with his moves, especially in the aerial realm. According to his peers, Toledo's volatility was the only thing stopping him from achieving his dream of a World Title. His high-flying act also makes him vulnerable to injury and his early youthful passion has led to a series of costly mental errors (he was suspended for one event in 2017 for his behavior in the wake of an interference call). He currently rides Sharp Eye Surfboards with a FCS II fin setup.

== Career Victories ==
WSL Finals Wins
Year	Event	Venue	Country
2023	Rip Curl WSL Finals	Lower Trestles, California	United States
2022	Rip Curl WSL Finals	Lower Trestles, California	United States

WCT Wins
Year	Event	Venue	Country
2025	Bonsoy Gold Coast Pro	Gold Coast, Queensland	Australia
2023	Corona Open J-Bay	Jeffreys Bay, Eastern Cap	South Africa
2023	Surf City El Salvador Pro	Punta Roca, La Libertad	El Salvador
2023	Hurley Pro Sunset Beach	Sunset Beach, Oahu	Hawaii
2022	Oi Rio Pro	Saquarema, Rio de Janeiro	Brazil
2022	Rip Curl Pro Bells Beach	Bells Beach, Victoria	Australia
2021	Jeep Surf Ranch Pro	Lemoore, California	United States
2021	Boost Mobile Margaret River Pro presented by Corona	Margaret River, Western Australia	Australia
2019	Oi Rio Pro	Saquarema, Rio de Janeiro	Brazil
2018	Corona J-Bay Open	Jeffreys Bay, Eastern Cap	South Africa
2018	Oi Rio Pro	Saquarema, Rio de Janeiro	Brazil
2017	Hurley Pro at Trestles	Trestles, California	United States
2017	Corona J-Bay Open	Jeffreys Bay, Eastern Cap	South Africa
2015	MEO Rip Curl Pro Portugal	Supertubos, Peniche	Portugal
2015	Oi Rio Pro	Rio de Janeiro, RJ	Brazil
2015	Quiksilver Pro Gold Coast	Gold Coast, Queensland	Australia
WQS Wins
Year	Event	Venue	Country
2017	Reef Hawaiian Pro	Haleiwa, Hawaii	Hawaii
2016	US Open of Surfing	Huntington Beach, California	United States
2015	Oakley Lowers Pro	San Diego County, California	United States
2014	O'Neill SP Prime	São Sebastião, São Paulo	Brazil
2014	US Open of Surfing	Huntington Beach, California	United States
2012	Sooruz Lacanau Pro	Lacanau	France
Juniors Wins
Year	Event	Venue	Country
2011	Billabong Surf Eco Festival	Salvador	Brazil
2011	US Open Junior Pro	Huntington Beach	United States

=== WSL World Championship Tour ===
Tournament	2013	2014	2015	2016	2017	2018	2019	2021	2022	2023	2024
Quiksilver Pro Gold Coast	13th	25th	1st	3rd	25th	5th	17th	-	-	-	
Rip Curl Pro Bells Beach	5th	13th	5th	INJ	5th	13th	2nd	-	1st	3rd	
Margaret River Pro	-	9th	25th	INJ	3rd	5th	17th	1st	9th	5th	
Oi Rio Pro	5th	13th	1st	9th	13th	1st	1st	-	1st	9th	
Corona Bali Protected	13th	-	-	-	-	5th	5th	-	-	-	
Corona Open J-Bay	-	25th	13th	5th	1st	1st	3rd	-	9th	1st	
Tahiti Pro Teahupoo	25th	INJ	9th	25th	25th	3rd	9th	-	17th	9th	
Surf Ranch Pro	-	-	-	-	-	2nd	-	1st	-	3rd	
Quiksilver Pro France	3rd	9th	25th	5th	25th	13th	17th	-	-	-	
MEO Rip Curl Pro Portugal	13th	5th	1st	13th	25th	13th	5th	-	2nd	17th	
Billabong Pipeline Masters	25th	5th	13th	9th	25th	13th	17th	17th	9th	5th	33rd
Fiji Pro	25th	9th	13th	13th	DNC	-	-	-	-	-	
Hurley Pro at Trestles	13th	13th	3rd	3rd	1st	-	-	-	-	-	
Rip Curl Newcastle Cup	-	-	-	-	-	-	-	3rd	-	-	
Rip Curl Narrabeen Classic	-	-	-	-	-	-	-	9th	-	-	
Rip Curl Rottnest Search presented by Corona	-	-	-	-	-	-	-	17th	-	-	
Corona Open Mexico presented by Quiksilver	-	-	-	-	-	-	-	17th	-	-	
Rip Curl WSL Finals	-	-	-	-	-	-	-	2nd	1st	1st	
Hurley Pro Sunset Beach	-	-	-	-	-	-	-	-	9th	1st	
Quiksilver Pro G-Land	-	-	-	-	-	-	-	-	2nd	-	
Surf City El Salvador Pro	-	-	-	-	-	-	-	-	2nd	1st	
Rank	15th	17th	4th	10th	9th	3rd	4th	2nd	1st	1st	
Earnings	$107,000	$112,000	$397,250	$138,500	$303,000	$388,000	$227,600				
