= Leonardo Fioravanti (surfer) =

Italian surfer (born 1997)

Personal information
- Born: December 8, 1997 (age 28) Rome, Lazio, Italy
- Years active: Since 2011 (15)
- Height: 5 ft 11 in (180 cm)
- Weight: 176 lb (80 kg)

Surfing career
- Sport: Surfing
- Best year: 2023, 2025 - Ranked #9 WSL CT World Tour
- Sponsors: Red Bull, Panerai, Bell by Euroglass, K-WAY
- Major achievements: WSL Championship Tour event wins: 1; 2022 Challenger Series champion

Surfing specifications
- Stance: Regular (natural foot)

Leonardo Fioravanti (born 8 December 1997) is a surfer who represented Italy at the 2020 Summer Olympics, the first surfer from Italy to compete in the newly-added Olympic surfing competition. He qualified for the 2024 Olympic Games.

== Career ==
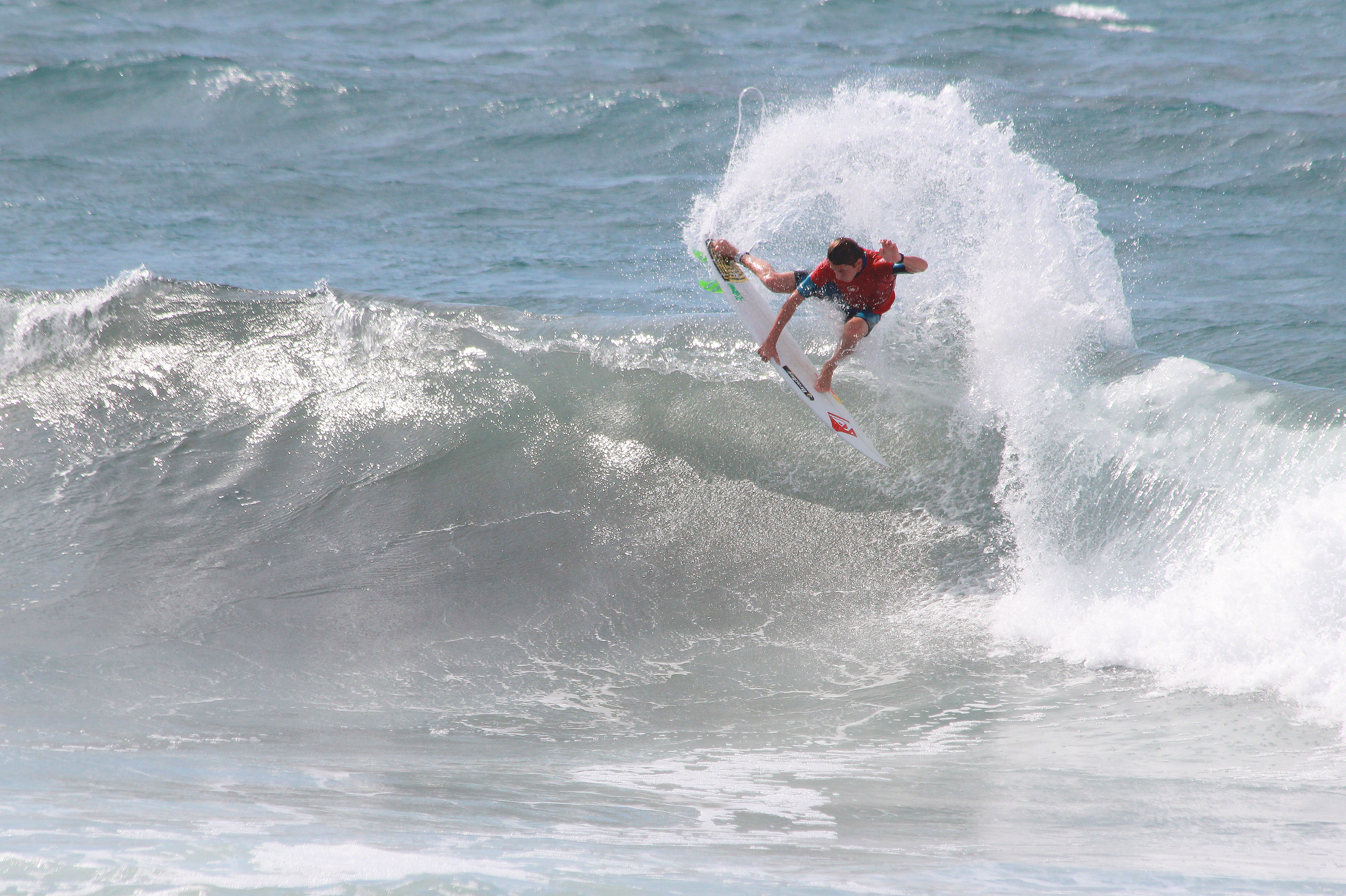
Fioravanti in 2013

Fioravanti competed in the 2016 US Open for surfing, pushing himself to compete despite injuries incurred during practice prior to the competition. He was eliminated in the contest, with indications that his injury contributed to his performance. He would go on to compete as the first surfer from Italy to perform at the inaugural Olympic surfing competition, replacing Jordy Smith from South Africa, who dropped out due to an injury. Fioravanti made it to the second round of the competition.

Fioravanti competed in his first stage of the CT in 2013 at the age of 16. In 2017 he reached the world elite for the first time, finishing 26th.

In the 2021 season he achieved his best result yet, finishing 13th. The following year he got off to a bad start and ended up in the mid-season cut. But when he competed in the 2022 Challenger Series, he scored the most points, winning the EDP Vissla Pro Ericeira stage in Portugal and becoming CS 2022 champion and returning to the CT.

In 2023, at the first stage of the season, he had his best result of his career, reaching the final of the Billabong Pro Pipeline and being beaten by Jack Robinson. Fioravanti had his best finish of his career so far, coming 9th in the season and qualifying for the Paris 2024 Olympics.

In 2024 Fioravanti took part in the Olympic Games for the second time. He was eliminated by Kanoa Igarashi in Round 2. At the 2024 CT he came 22nd place. In 2025 CT he started the season by reaching the final of the Pipe Pro for the second time in his career and again lost to the defending champion from the 2024 event, Barron Mamiya.

== Career victories ==
WCT Wins
Year	Event	Venue	Country
2026	Surf City El Salvador Pro	Punta Roca, La Libertad	El Salvador
WSL Challenger Series Wins
Year	Event	Venue	Country
2022	EDP Vissla Pro Ericeira	Ribeira D'Ilhas, Ericeira	Portugal
2020	Sydney Surf Pro	Manly Beach, New South Wales	Australia
WQS Wins
Year	Event	Venue	Country
2018	Martinique Surf Pro	Basse Pointe, Martinique	France
2014	Pantin Classic Galicia Pro	Valdoviño, Galicia	Spain
Juniors Wins
Year	Event	Venue	Country
2013	Gran Canaria Santa Pro Junior	Las Palmas, Canary Islands	Spain
