= Jordy Smith =

South African surfer (born 1988)

Personal information
- Born: 11 February 1988 (age 38) Durban, South Africa
- Height: 190 cm (6 ft 3 in)
- Weight: 86 kg (190 lb)

Surfing career
- Sport: Surfing
- Best year: 2010, 2016, – Ranked #2 WSL CT World Tour, 2025 – Ranked #3 WSL CT World Tour
- Sponsors: Channel Islands surfboards, Oakley, O'Neill, Red Bull, Brand Black Shoes, Vestal Watches, Futures Fins, Trace, Muzik headphones, Neff headwear
- Major achievements: 2006 WSL World Junior Champion; 2007 World Qualifying Series Champion; WSL Championship Tour event wins: 8; 2006 ISA World Surfing Games Champion; 2008 WSL Rookie of the Year

Surfing specifications
- Stance: Natural (regular foot)
Medal record
Competition
Gold medal – first place	X-Games 2013	Real Surf

Jordan Michael "Jordy" Smith (born 11 February 1988) is a South African professional surfer, competing on the World championship tour surfing (WCT). In 2007 Smith won surfing's World Qualifying Series, the second-tier tour that leads to qualification for the World championship tour (WCT) surfing.

Jordy Smith won both the 2010 and 2011 Billabong J-Bay competitions in South Africa. He has also won 2014 and 2016 Hurley Pro at trestles California . In 2013 he won the Rio Pro in Brazil. All of these contests are part of the world championship tour.

Smith grew up in Durban and started surfing at age 3. He attended a local Durban high school, Kenmont High Sool and Glenwood High School.

Smith is known for the manoeuvres "rodeo flip" and full rotation "alley-oops [3]", and he has been sponsored by O'Neill since 2007.

In 2014, Smith married South African model Lyndall Jarvis.

Outside surfing, Smith is a supporter of S.L. Benfica.

He qualified to represent South Africa at the 2020 Summer Olympics.

He qualified for the 2024 Olympic Games.

== Career victories ==
WCT Wins
Year	Event	Venue	Country
2025	Margaret River Pro	Margaret River, Western Australia	Australia
2025	Surf City El Salvador Pro	Punta Roca, La Libertad	El Salvador
2017	Rip Curl Pro Bells Beach	Bells Beach, Victoria	Australia
2016	Hurley Pro at Trestles	Trestles, California	United States
2014	Hurley Pro at Trestles	Trestles, California	United States
2013	Billabong Rio Pro	Rio de Janeiro, RJ	Brazil
2011	Billabong Pro J-Bay	Jeffreys Bay, Eastern Cap	South Africa
2010	Billabong Pro J-Bay	Jeffreys Bay, Eastern Cap	South Africa
WQS Wins
Year	Event	Venue	Country
2017	Ballito Pro	Ballito, KwaZulu-Natal	South Africa
2016	Vans World Cup	Sunset Beach, Oahu	Hawaii
2010	Mr Price Ballito	Ballito, KwaZulu-Natal	South Africa
2009	O'Neill Coldwater Classic	Marrawah, Tasmania	Australia
2007	O'Neill Coldwater Classic	Santa Cruz, California	United States
2007	Sooruz Lacanau Pro	Grand Plage, Lacanau, Gironde	France
2007	Lizzard Nandos Surf Pro pres. by the Weekend Witness	New Pier, Durban	South Africa
2007	Hot Tuna Central Coast Pro	Soldiers Beach, NSW	Australia

Founders' Cup of Surfing
Year	Event	Venue	Country
2018	Outerknown Founders Cup	Lemoore, California	United States
