= Connor O'Leary =

Japanese professional surfer (born 1993)

Personal information
- Born: 12 October 1993 (age 33) Cronulla, New South Wales, Australia
- Height: 6 ft 1 in (185 cm)
- Weight: 187 lb (85 kg)

Surfing career
- Sport: Surfing
- Best year: 2022 – Ranked No. 9 WSL CT World Tour
- Sponsors: WSL Championship Tour event wins: 1
- Major achievements: 2016 World Qualifying Series Champion; 2017 WSL Rookie of the Year

Surfing specifications
- Stance: Goofy

Connor O'Leary (born 12 October 1993, in Cronulla, New South Wales) is an Australian-Japanese professional surfer.

== Early life ==
O’Leary was born in Cronulla, a suburb of Sydney, to an Irish-Australian father and a former Japanese surfing champion mother.

== Surfing career ==
Despite a few wins during his junior career, O'Leary was not considered particularly promising. In 2015, he turned professional and competed in the World Surf League Qualifying Series (QS) for the first time, arriving in Hawaii inside the qualifying bubble, narrowly missing out on his place in the last two events. In 2016, he had a win in the Qualifying Series 10,000 in Ballito, and other solid results led to him becoming the 2016 Qualifying Series champion.

O'Leary made his CT debut in the 2017 season, reaching his first Championship Tour (CT) final at the Fiji Pro, losing to Australian Matt Wilkinson. He finished the season in 13th place and won the Rookie of the Year award.

In the 2018 season, O'Leary did not perform as well and did not re-qualify for the 2019 Championship Tour. In the 2019 Qualifying Series, he finished ninth and qualified for the next year's CT. After the COVID-19 pandemic, O'Leary returned in the 2021 season but failed to reclassify. In the same year, he competed in the Challenger Series, won the Quiksilver Pro France stage, finished fourth in the rankings and returned to the CT.

O'Leary had the best season of his career on the CT in 2022, when he finished ninth in the rankings, remaining on the CT for the next season.

=== Change of nationality ===
Since 2021, because of his Japanese ancestry, O'Leary had been wearing the Australian and Japanese flags on his wetsuit. In August 2023, he decided to represent Japan, a move approved by the International Surfing Association (ISA). The change guaranteed his Olympic qualification and he represented Japan at the Paris 2024 Olympic Games. He competed in the men's shortboard and made it as far as Round 3, where he was eliminated by Australian Ethan Ewing.

O'Leary finished the season on the CT in 16th place, re-qualifying for the next season.

== Career victories ==
WCT Wins
Year	Event	Venue	Country
2025	Corona Open J-Bay	Jeffreys Bay, Eastern Cape	South Africa
WSL Challenger Series Wins
Year	Event	Venue	Country
2021	Quiksilver Pro France	Hossegor, Nouvelle-Aquitaine	France
WQS Wins
Year	Event	Venue	Country
2019	Vissla Central Coast Pro	Avoca Beach, New South Wales	Australia
2019	Carve Pro	Maroubra, New South Wales	Australia
2016	Ballito Pro	Ballito, KwaZulu-Natal	South Africa
2012	Murasaki Quiksilver Jeju Open	Jeju, Jeju Island	South Korea
Juniors Wins
Year	Event	Venue	Country
2013	Go Pro Junior	Ichinomiya, Chiba	Japan
