= Owen Wright (surfer) =

Australian surfer (born 1990)

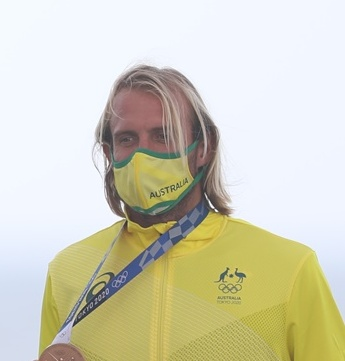
- Wright at the 2020 Summer Olympics

Personal information
- Born: 16 January 1990 (age 36) Culburra Beach, New South Wales, Australia
- Height: 190 cm (6 ft 3 in)
- Weight: 81 kg (179 lb; 12.8 st)

Surfing career
- Sport: Surfing
- Best year: 2011 - Ranked #3 WSL CT World Tour
- Career earnings: $780,550
- Sponsors: Rip Curl, Dragon Optics, FCS, Gorilla Grip, JS Industries surfboards, Ocean & Earth
- Major achievements: WSL Championship Tour event wins: 4; First surfer to post two perfect scores in one event; 2020 Olympics bronze Medal; 2010 WSL Rookie of the Year

Surfing specifications
- Stance: Goofy
Medal record
Men's surfing
Representing Australia
Olympic Games
Bronze medal – third place	2020 Tokyo	Shortboard

Owen Wright (born 16 January 1990) is an Australian professional surfer on the World Surf League (formerly the Association of Surfing Professionals) Men's Championship Tour. His sister, Tyler Wright, is also a competitor on the World Surf League Championship Tour.

On 16 June 2015 Wright became the first surfer to post two perfect scores in a single event, during Round 5 and the final of the Fiji Pro. At the 2020 Tokyo Olympics, Wright won Australia's first surfing Olympic bronze medal.

== Personal life ==
Wright was born on 16 January 1990 and grew up at Culburra Beach on the south coast of New South Wales. He has 5 siblings who all surf including his sister Tyler Wright who is a two-time Women's Surfing World Champion. Wright's brother Mikey competes on the Men's Championship Tour as well.

As a junior, along with his sister Tyler and fellow south coast local World Tour competitor Sally Fitzgibbons, he competed in GromSearch, a national series development program that gives under 16 year olds the opportunity to compete against top senior surfers.

Wright is married to Australian singer Kita Alexander. They have a son born in December 2016 and a daughter born in January 2021.

== Professional career ==
Wright won the Australian title in 2007 and qualified for the Champions Tour in 2009. In his 2010 debut season he ranked seventh, and was named Rookie of the Year. In 2011 he won his first Champions Tour event at Long Island, New York, receiving surfing's largest-ever prize of $300,000.

During the 2015 tour, Wright won his second title at the Fiji Pro event scoring two perfect 10-point rides. This was the first time such a score had been achieved at the one event and he was only the fifth surfer to ever achieve a perfect 20. The win took him to third place in the 2015 season's standings.

In December, in the lead up to the Pipeline Masters, the final event of the 2015 calendar, he had a wipe out at Banzai Pipeline in Hawaii. Wright suffered a traumatic brain injury and had to relearn how to talk, walk and then surf again. He recorded his recovery steps on social media. Owen is now championing the use of safety helmets while surfing to protect surfers from wipeout injuries.

After spending 2016 recovering, Wright was granted a wildcard entry to the 2017 World Surf League season.

In his comeback, Wright won the Champions Tour calendar's opening event, the Quiksilver Pro at Snapper Rocks on Australia's Gold Coast. It was his third WSL title.

In between WSL events, Wright trained with Surfing Australia's national squad preparing for the debut of surfing at the Tokyo 2020 Olympic Games where he won a bronze medal.

In August 2023, Wright released his debut memoir, Against The Water, which tells the story of "his relationship with the ocean, his children, and his brain". The book is published by Simon & Schuster.

Property

Wight owns a luxury accommodation business in Byron Bay, with his wife, Kita Alexander called Paradiso Property.

== Career victories ==
WCT Wins
Year	Event	Venue	Country
2019	Billabong Pro Teahupoo	Teahupo'o, Tahiti	Tahiti
2017	Quiksilver Pro Gold Coast	Gold Coast, Queensland	Australia
2015	Fiji Pro	Namotu, Tavarua	Fiji
2011	Quiksilver Pro New York	Long Island, New York	USA
WQS Wins
Year	Event	Venue	Country
2013	Breaka Burleigh Pro	Burleigh Heads, Queensland	Australia
2009	Maldives SriLankan Airlines Pro	Pasta Point	Maldives
