= Billabong Pro Teahupoo 2008 =

The 2008 Billabong Pro Teahupoo surfing competition was held at Teahupo'o in Tahiti. The winner was Bruno Santos of Brazil.

== Round 1 ==
Heat 1
1	Dean Morrison	(Australia)	16.16
2	Jordy Smith	(South Africa)	12.73
3	Ricky Basnett	(South Africa)	9.17

Heat 2
1	Kai Otton	(Australia)	14.07
2	Luke Munro	(Australia)	13.40
3	Royden Bryson	(South Africa)	11.17

Heat 3
1	Bobby Martinez	(United States)	14.74
3	Leonardo Neves	(Brazil)	6.73
2	Travis Logie	(South Africa)	13.50

Heat 4
2	Jeremy Flores	(France)	10.44
3	Roy Powers	(United States)	3.07
1	Tiago Pires	(Portugal)	15.17

Heat 5
1	Andy Irons	(United States)	11.27
2	Tim Reyes	(United States)	10.50
3	Aritz Aranburu	(Spain)	6.63

Heat 6
1	Joel Parkinson	(Australia)	13.94
3	Ben Dunn	(Australia)	10.77
2	Chris Ward	(United States)	12.87

Heat 7
2	Bede Durbidge	(Australia)	14.00
1	Dayyan Neve	(Australia)	16.16
3	Nic Muscroft	(Australia)	5.20

Heat 8
2	Kelly Slater	(United States)	15.30
3	CJ Hobgood	(United States)	13.00
1	Manoa Drollet	(French Polynesia)	18.60

Heat 9
2	Mick Fanning	(Australia)	9.40
1	Pancho Sullivan	(United States)	9.50
3	Jamie O'Brien	(United States)	8.03

Heat 10
1	Taj Burrow	(Australia)	14.50
2	Tom Whitaker	(Australia)	12.73
3	Bruno Santos	(Brazil)	6.70

Heat 11
1	Adrian Buchan	(Australia)	11.43
3	Jay Thompson	(Australia)	7.00
2	Daniel Ross	(Australia)	8.73

Heat 12
1	Adriano De Souza	(Brazil)	19.53
2	Kieren Perrow	(Australia)	9.20
3	Mikael Picon	(France)	9.20

Heat 13
2	Taylor Knox	(United States)	6.83
3	Rodrigo Dornelles	(Brazil)	4.93
1	Heitor Alves	(Brazil)	15.27

Heat 14
1	Luke Stedman	(Australia)	15.33
2	Fredrick Patacchia	(United States)	11.93
3	Jihad Khodr	(Brazil)	3.16

Heat 15
3	Dane Reynolds	(United States)	11.77
2	Bruce Irons	(United States)	16.50
1	Michael Campbell	(Australia)	18.24

Heat 16
2	Neco Padaratz	(Brazil)	14.10
1	Daniel Wills	(Australia)	14.83
3	Ben Bourgeois	(United States)	10.26

== Round 2 ==
Heat 1: 1 / Kelly Slater / (United States) / 18.70; 2 / Jamie O'Brien / (United States) / 13.90	Heat 2: 2 / Mick Fanning / (Australia) / 9.17; 1 / Bruno Santos / (Brazil) / 10.00	Heat 3: 1 / Bede Durbidge / (Australia) / 13.74; 2 / Nic Muscroft / (Australia) / 2.97	Heat 4: 2 / Jeremy Flores / (France) / 12.90; 1 / Chris Ward / (United States) / 14.50

Heat 5: 1 / Taylor Knox / (United States) / 11.83; 2 / Aritz Aranburu / (France) / 7.44	Heat 6: 1 / Dane Reynolds / (United States) / 14.50; 2 / Travis Logie / (South Africa) / 12.26	Heat 7: 2 / Neco Padaratz / (Brazil) / 9.60; 1 / Royden Bryson / (South Africa) / 13.33	Heat 8: 1 / CJ Hobgood / (United States) / 16.67; 2 / Ricky Basnett / (South Africa) / 6.17

Heat 9: 1 / Tom Whitaker / (Australia) / 15.84; 2 / Daniel Ross / (Australia) / 9.40	Heat 10: 2 / Ben Dunn / (Australia) / 9.83; 1 / Mikael Picon / (France) / 15.07	Heat 11: 1 / Tim Reyes / (United States) / 10.50; 2 / Jihad Khodr / (Brazil) / 5.53	Heat 12: 2 / Roy Powers / (United States) / 10.00; 1 / Ben Bourgeois / (United States) / 17.00

Heat 13: 2 / Leonardo Neves / (Brazil) / 16.90; 1 / Bruce Irons / (United States) / 18.33	Heat 14: 1 / Luke Munro / (Australia) / 17.76; 2 / Fredrick Patacchia / (United States) / 17.24	Heat 15: 1 / Jordy Smith / (South Africa) / 13.77; 2 / Rodrigo Dornelles / (Brazil) / 11.17	Heat 16: 1 / Jay Thompson / (Australia) / 17.10; 2 / Kieren Perrow / (Australia) / 16.67

== Round 3 ==
Heat 1: 1 / Andy Irons / (United States) / 15.50; 2 / Royden Bryson / (South Africa) / 12.47	Heat 2: 1 / Luke Stedman / (Australia) / 17.53; 2 / Jay Thompson / (Australia) / 12.40	Heat 3: 1 / Dane Reynolds / (United States) / 18.17; 2 / Jordy Smith / (South Africa) / 12.23	Heat 4: 1 / Joel Parkinson / (Australia) / 13.06; 2 / Tiago Pires / (Portugal) / 10.00

Heat 5: 1 / Dean Morrison / (Australia) / 17.94; 2 / Michael Campbell / (Australia) / 15.00	Heat 6: 1 / Adrian Buchan / (Australia) / 18.63; 2 / Ben Bourgeois / (United States) / 16.40	Heat 7: 1 / Tom Whitaker / (Australia) / 17.66; 2 / Dayyan Neve / (Australia) / 11.37	Heat 8: 2 / Kelly Slater / (United States) / 9.83; 1 / Manoa Drollet / (French Polynesia) / 14.00

Heat 9: 1 / Tom Whitaker / (Australia) / 15.84; 2 / Daniel Ross / (Australia) / 9.40	Heat 10: 2 / Ben Dunn / (Australia) / 9.83; 1 / Mikael Picon / (France) / 15.07	Heat 11: 1 / Tim Reyes / (United States) / 10.50; 2 / Jihad Khodr / (Brazil) / 5.53	Heat 12: 2 / Roy Powers / (United States) / 10.00; 1 / Ben Bourgeois / (United States) / 17.00

Heat 13: 2 / Leonardo Neves / (Brazil) / 16.90; 1 / Bruce Irons / (United States) / 18.33	Heat 14: 1 / Luke Munro / (Australia) / 17.76; 2 / Fredrick Patacchia / (United States) / 17.24	Heat 15: 1 / Jordy Smith / (South Africa) / 13.77; 2 / Rodrigo Dornelles / (Brazil) / 11.17	Heat 16: 1 / Jay Thompson / (Australia) / 17.10; 2 / Kieren Perrow / (Australia) / 16.67

== Round 4 ==
Heat 1: 1 / Andy Irons / (United States) / 18.93; 2 / Luke Stedman / (Australia) / 13.26	Heat 2: 2 / Dane Reynolds / (United States) / 8.17; 1 / Joel Parkinson / (Australia) / 18.50	Heat 3: 2 / Dean Morrison / (Australia) / 14.50; 1 / Adrian Buchan / (Australia) / 15.50	Heat 4: 1 / Tom Whitaker / (Australia) / 5.33; 1 / Manoa Drollet / (French Polynesia) / 15.00

Heat 5: 1 / Bruno Santos / (Brazil) / 15.34; 2 / Tim Reyes / (United States) / 3.70	Heat 6: 2 / Kai Otton / (Australia) / 10.84; 1 / Adriano De Souza / (Brazil) / 12.50	Heat 7: 2 / Chris Ward / (United States) / 2.10; 1 / CJ Hobgood / (United States) / 9.00	Heat 8: 2 / Mikael Picon / (France) / 8.73; 1 / Bruce Irons / (United States) / 15.16

== Quarter finals ==
Heat 1: 2 / Andy Irons / (United States) / 6.14; 1 / Joel Parkinson / (Australia) / 16.33	Heat 2: 2 / Adrian Buchan / (Australia) / 9.83; 1 / Manoa Drollet / (French Polynesia) / 17.84	Heat 3: 1 / Bruno Santos / (Brazil) / 9.83; 2 / Adriano De Souza / (Brazil) / 9.07	Heat 4: 1 / CJ Hobgood / (United States) / 15.00; 2 / Bruce Irons / (United States) / 10.16

== Semi finals ==
Heat 1: 2 / Joel Parkinson / (Australia) / 10.27; 1 / Manoa Drollet / (French Polynesia) / 18.33	Heat 2: 1 / Bruno Santos / (Brazil) / 14.34; 2 / C.J. Hobgood / (United States) / 8.67

== Final ==
Final
2	Manoa Drollet	(French Polynesia)	6.83
1	Bruno Santos	(Brazil)	9.16
