= Moche Rip Curl Pro Portugal 2015 =

Surfing event

Moche Rip Curl Pro Portugal 2015 at the Surf
- Location: Peniche (POR)
- Dates: 20 to 31 October
- Competitors: 36 from 10 nations

Medalists
gold medal	Filipe Toledo	Brazil
silver medal	Italo Ferreira	Brazil

The Moche Rip Curl Pro Portugal 2015 was an event of the Association of Surfing Professionals for 2015 ASP World Tour.

This event was held from 20 to 31 October at Peniche, (Leiria, Portugal), with 36 surfers competing.

The tournament was won by Filipe Toledo (BRA), who beat Italo Ferreira (BRA) in the final.

== Round 1 ==
Heat 1
1	Filipe Toledo	(Brazil)	13.17
2	Tomas Hermes	(Brazil)	12.83
3	Jadson Andre	(Brazil)	8.40

Heat 2
1	Gabriel Medina	(Brazil)	14.00
2	Miguel Pupo	(Brazil)	12.60
3	Mason Ho	(Hawaii)	10.86

Heat 3
1	Keanu Asing	(Hawaii)	12.30
2	Caio Ibelli	(Brazil)	12.07
3	Julian Wilson	(Australia)	8.70

Heat 4
1	Vasco Ribeiro	(Portugal)	12.17
2	Michel Bourez	(French Polynesia)	11.47
3	Owen Wright	(Australia)	11.07

Heat 5
1	Frederico Morais	(Portugal)	16.43
2	Kolohe Andino	(United States)	16.27
3	A. de Souza	(Brazil)	16.27

Heat 6
1	Mick Fanning	(Australia)	13.24
2	Tiago Pires	(Portugal)	10.17
3	Sebastian Zietz	(Hawaii)	9.10

Heat 7
1	Kelly Slater	(United States)	13.90
2	Aritz Aranburu	(Spain)	11.86
3	Adrian Buchan	(Australia)	8.67

Heat 8
1	Brett Simpson	(United States)	16.13
2	Joel Parkinson	(Australia)	15.33
2	Italo Ferreira	(Brazil)	14.60

Heat 9
1	Matt Wilkinson	(Australia)	15.63
2	Jérémy Florès	(France)	13.07
3	Ricardo Christie	(New Zealand)	12.67

Heat 10
1	Nat Young	(United States)	12.60
2	Kai Otton	(Australia)	10.34
3	Glenn Hall	(Republic of Ireland)	9.54

Heat 11
1	Bede Durbidge	(Australia)	14.17
2	John Florence	(Hawaii)	11.60
3	C. J. Hobgood	(United States)	10.16

Heat 12
1	Josh Kerr	(Australia)	15.97
2	Wiggolly Dantas	(Brazil)	13.94
3	Adam Melling	(Australia)	10.04

== Round 2 ==
Heat 1: 1 / A. de Souza / (Brazil) / 12.43; 2 / Tiago Pires / (Portugal) / 6.17	Heat 2: 1 / Caio Ibelli / (Brazil) / 13.33; 2 / Owen Wright / (Australia) / 12.37	Heat 3: 1 / Mason Ho / (Hawaii) / 13.93; 2 / Julian Wilson / (Australia) / 13.06	Heat 4: 1 / Italo Ferreira / (Brazil) / 11.50; 2 / Tomas Hermes / (Brazil) / 9.74

Heat 5: 1 / Jérémy Florès / (France) / 12.76; 2 / Aritz Aranburu / (Spain) / 12.00	Heat 6: 1 / Ricardo Christie / (New Zealand) / 10.73; 2 / Wiggolly Dantas / (Brazil) / 8.70	Heat 7: 1 / John Florence / (Hawaii) / 16.20; 2 / Glenn Hall / (Republic of Ireland) / 8.70	Heat 8: 1 / C. J. Hobgood / (United States) / 10.33; 2 / Kai Otton / (Australia) / 6.67

Heat 9: 1 / Joel Parkinson / (Australia) / 12.00; 2 / Adan Melling / (Australia) / 7.70	Heat 10: 1 / Sebastian Zietz / (Hawaii) / 11.90; 2 / Adrian Buchan / (Australia) / 9.43	Heat 11: 1 / Kolohe Andino / (United States) / 14.83; 2 / Jadson Andre / (Brazil) / 9.47	Heat 12: 1 / Michel Bourez / (French Polynesia) / 11.17; 2 / Miguel Pupo / (Brazil) / 10.83

== Round 3 ==
Heat 1: 1 / Filipe Toledo / (Brazil) / 14.70; 2 / Mason Ho / (Hawaii) / 2.76	Heat 2: 1 / Kolohe Andino / (United States) / 13.06; 2 / Bede Durbidge / (Australia) / 10.43	Heat 3: 1 / Brett Simpson / (United States) / 12.43; 2 / Kelly Slater / (United States) / 8.06	Heat 4: 1 / Nat Young / (United States) / 16.67; 2 / Sebastian Zietz / (Hawaii) / 13.17

Heat 5: 1 / Joel Parkinson / (Australia) / 15.00; 2 / Matt Wilkinson / (Australia) / 14.60	Heat 6: 1 / Frederico Morais / (Portugal) / 16.03; 2 / Mick Fanning / (Australia) / 14.40	Heat 7: 1 / Vasco Ribeiro / (Portugal) / 14.36; 2 / A. de Souza / (Brazil) / 11.80	Heat 8: 1 / Keanu Asing / (Hawaii) / 13.43; 2 / John Florence / (Hawaii) / 13.16

Heat 9: 1 / Jérémy Florès / (France) / 17.26; 2 / C. J. Hobgood / (United States) / 12.47	Heat 10: 1 / Italo Ferreira / (Brazil) / 14.17; 2 / Ricardo Christie / (New Zealand) / 12.84	Heat 11: 1 / Michel Bourez / (French Polynesia) / 13.17; 2 / Josh Kerr / (Australia) / 13.10	Heat 12: 1 / Gabriel Medina / (Brazil) / 17.67; 2 / Caio Ibelli / (Brazil) / 15.87

== Round 4 ==
Heat 1
1	Filipe Toledo	(Brazil)	19.00
2	Kolohe Andino	(United States)	18.00
3	Brett Simpson	(United States)	17.57

Heat 2
1	Frederico Morais	(Portugal)	14.96
2	Nat Young	(United States)	14.50
3	Joel Parkinson	(Australia)	7.43

Heat 3
1	Jérémy Florès	(France)	14.63
2	Vasco Ribeiro	(Portugal)	10.60
3	Keanu Asing	(Hawaii)	8.36

Heat 4
1	Italo Ferreira	(Brazil)	17.17
2	Gabriel Medina	(Brazil)	10.73
3	Michel Bourez	(French Polynesia)	7.77

== Round 5 ==
Heat 1: 1 / Joel Parkinson / (Australia) / 12.84; 2 / Kolohe Andino / (United States) / 10.67	Heat 2: 1 / Brett Simpson / (United States) / 9.77; 2 / Nat Young / (United States) / 6.33	Heat 3: 1 / Vasco Ribeiro / (Portugal) / 10.43; 2 / Michel Bourez / (French Polynesia) / 7.77	Heat 4: 1 / Gabriel Medina / (Brazil) / 9.26; 2 / Keanu Asing / (Hawaii) / 5.30

== Quarter finals ==
Heat 1: 1 / Filipe Toledo / (Brazil) / 10.37; 2 / Joel Parkinson / (Australia) / 8.67	Heat 2: 1 / Brett Simpson / (United States) / 10.54; 2 / Frederico Morais / (Portugal) / 10.46	Heat 3: 1 / Vasco Ribeiro / (Portugal) / 13.34; 2 / Jérémy Florès / (France) / 8.17	Heat 4: 1 / Italo Ferreira / (Brazil) / 18.27; 2 / Gabriel Medina / (Brazil) / 6.83

== Semi finals ==
Heat 1: 1 / Filipe Toledo / (Brazil) / 14.60; 2 / Brett Simpson / (United States) / 12.94	Heat 2: 1 / Italo Ferreira / (Brazil) / 13.37; 2 / Vasco Ribeiro / (Portugal) / 9.10

== Final ==
Heat 1
1	Filipe Toledo	(Brazil)	17.83
2	Italo Ferreira	(Brazil)	17.13
