= Billabong Pro Teahupoo 2015 =

Billabong Pro Teahupoo 2015 at the Surf
- Location: Teahupo'o (PYF)
- Dates: 14 to 25 Aug
- Competitors: 36 from 8 nations

Medalists
gold medal	Jérémy Florès	France
silver medal	Gabriel Medina	Brazil

The Billabong Pro Teahupoo 2015 was an event of the Association of Surfing Professionals for 2015 ASP World Tour.

This event was held from 08 to 19 July at Teahupo'o, (Tahiti, French Polynesia) and opposed by 36 surfers.

The tournament was won by Jérémy Florès (FRA), who beat Gabriel Medina (BRA) in final.

== Round 1 ==
Heat 1
1	Kelly Slater	(United States)	15.10
2	Jadson Andre	(Brazil)	8.23
3	Brett Simpson	(United States)	4.70

Heat 2
1	Owen Wright	(Australia)	11.67
2	Adrian Buchan	(Australia)	11.50
3	C. J. Hobgood	(United States)	9.67

Heat 3
1	Aritz Aranburu	(Spain)	13.10
2	Keanu Asing	(Hawaii)	7.36
3	Filipe Toledo	(Brazil)	5.37

Heat 4
1	Julian Wilson	(Australia)	10.66
2	Sebastian Zietz	(Hawaii)	9.00
3	Garrett Parkes	(Australia)	1.30

Heat 5
1	Mick Fanning	(Australia)	12.17
2	Adan Melling	(Australia)	6.26
3	T. Puhetini	(French Polynesia)	1.33

Heat 6
1	Bruno Santos	(Brazil)	8.67
2	A. de Souza	(Brazil)	5.30
3	Michel Bourez	(French Polynesia)	2.44

Heat 7
1	Dusty Payne	(Hawaii)	10.00
2	Nat Young	(United States)	5.14
3	Kai Otton	(Australia)	1.30

Heat 8
1	Joel Parkinson	(Australia)	10.83
2	Taj Burrow	(Australia)	4.77
3	Glenn Hall	(Republic of Ireland)	2.96

Heat 9
1	Josh Kerr	(Australia)	17.17
2	Kolohe Andino	(United States)	12.80
3	Matt Wilkinson	(Australia)	9.00

Heat 10
1	Italo Ferreira	(Brazil)	14.43
2	Gabriel Medina	(Brazil)	14.27
3	Ricardo Christie	(New Zealand)	5.73

Heat 11
1	John Florence	(Hawaii)	17.96
2	F. Patacchia	(Hawaii)	13.83
3	Bede Durbidge	(Australia)	11.43

Heat 12
1	Jérémy Florès	(France)	14.90
2	Wiggolly Dantas	(Brazil)	12.34
3	Miguel Pupo	(Brazil)	12.27

== Round 2 ==
Heat 1: 1 / A. de Souza / (Brazil) / 16.26; 2 / T. Puhetini / (French Polynesia) / 8.44	Heat 2: 1 / Filipe Toledo / (Brazil) / 8.57; 2 / Garrett Parkes / (Australia) / 8.23	Heat 3: 1 / C. J. Hobgood / (United States) / 18.13; 2 / Nat Young / (United States) / 16.66	Heat 4: 1 / Brett Simpson / (United States) / 16.50; 2 / Taj Burrow / (Australia) / 10.23

Heat 5: 1 / Bede Durbidge / (Australia) / 14.36; 2 / Glenn Hall / (Republic of Ireland) / 9.44	Heat 6: 1 / Wiggolly Dantas / (Brazil) / 10.83; 2 / Kolohe Andino / (United States) / 4.47	Heat 7: 1 / Gabriel Medina / (Brazil) / 17.67; 2 / Ricardo Christie / (New Zealand) / 12.44	Heat 8: 1 / Matt Wilkinson / (Australia) / 12.50; 2 / F. Patacchia / (Hawaii) / 10.96

Heat 9: 1 / Kai Otton / (Australia) / 14.66; 2 / Miguel Pupo / (Brazil) / 5.54	Heat 10: 1 / Jadson Andre / (Brazil) / 16.27; 2 / Michel Bourez / (French Polynesia) / 10.60	Heat 11: 1 / Adrian Buchan / (Australia) / 16.40; 2 / Adan Melling / (Australia) / 15.27	Heat 12: 1 / Sebastian Zietz / (Hawaii) / 14.60; 2 / Keanu Asing / (Hawaii) / 14.67

== Round 3 ==
Heat 1: 1 / Filipe Toledo / (Brazil) / 16.97; 2 / Brett Simpson / (United States) / 12.50	Heat 2: 1 / Kai Otton / (Australia) / 13.13; 2 / Bede Durbidge / (Australia) / 12.00	Heat 3: 1 / Owen Wright / (Australia) / 18.23; 2 / Dusty Payne / (Hawaii) / 15.70	Heat 4: 1 / Italo Ferreira / (Brazil) / 16.10; 2 / Jadson Andre / (Brazil) / 9.83

Heat 5: 1 / Gabriel Medina / (Brazil) / 19.00; 2 / John Florence / (Hawaii) / 18.84	Heat 6: 1 / Bruno Santos / (Brazil) / 15.75; 2 / A. de Souza / (Brazil) / 9.67	Heat 7: 1 / Aritz Aranburu / (Spain) / 15.17; 2 / Mick Fanning / (Australia) / 6.67	Heat 8: 1 / Wiggolly Dantas / (Brazil) / 16.83; 2 / Matt Wilkinson / (Australia) / 8.66

Heat 9: 1 / Josh Kerr / (Australia) / 15.80; 2 / Adrian Buchan / (Australia) / 13.67	Heat 10: 1 / Kelly Slater / (United States) / 14.06; 2 / Sebastian Zietz / (Hawaii) / 13.33	Heat 11: 1 / Jérémy Florès / (France) / 18.87; 2 / Joel Parkinson / (Australia) / 14.60	Heat 12: 1 / C. J. Hobgood / (United States) / 13.60; 2 / Julian Wilson / (Australia) / 9.50

== Round 4 ==
Heat 1
1	Owen Wright	(Australia)	14.84
2	Filipe Toledo	(Brazil)	13.06
3	Kai Otton	(Australia)	11.50

Heat 2
1	Gabriel Medina	(Brazil)	17.64
2	Bruno Santos	(Brazil)	17.10
3	Italo Ferreira	(Brazil)	6.84

Heat 3
1	Josh Kerr	(Australia)	13.20
2	Aritz Aranburu	(Spain)	11.43
3	Wiggolly Dantas	(Brazil)	6.40

Heat 4
1	Kelly Slater	(United States)	16.60
2	Jérémy Florès	(France)	14.66
3	C. J. Hobgood	(United States)	8.30

== Round 5 ==
Heat 1: 1 / Italo Ferreira / (Brazil) / 15.00; 2 / Filipe Toledo / (Brazil) / 0.00	Heat 2: 1 / Kai Otton / (Australia) / 13.50; 2 / Bruno Santos / (Brazil) / 8.90	Heat 3: 1 / C. J. Hobgood / (United States) / 14.36; 2 / Aritz Aranburu / (Spain) / 12.76	Heat 4: 1 / Jérémy Florès / (France) / 13.37; 2 / Wiggolly Dantas / (Brazil) / 13.23

== Quarter finals ==
Heat 1: 1 / Owen Wright / (Australia) / 16.93; 2 / Italo Ferreira / (Brazil) / 15.94	Heat 2: 1 / Gabriel Medina / (Brazil) / 15.67; 2 / Kai Otton / (Australia) / 11.00	Heat 3: 1 / C. J. Hobgood / (United States) / 12.90; 2 / Josh Kerr / (Australia) / 11.16	Heat 4: 1 / Jérémy Florès / (France) / 16.83; 2 / Kelly Slater / (United States) / 15.66

== Semi finals ==
Heat 1: 1 / Gabriel Medina / (Brazil) / 16.63; 2 / Owen Wright / (Australia) / 8.70	Heat 2: 1 / Jérémy Florès / (France) / 15.86; 2 / C. J. Hobgood / (United States) / 8.93

== Final ==
Heat 1
1	Jérémy Florès	(France)	16.87
2	Gabriel Medina	(Brazil)	13.20
