= 2006 ASP World Tour =

Professional surfing league season

The 2006 ASP World Tour is a professional competitive surfing league. It is run by the Association of Surfing Professionals.

== Men's World Tour ==
=== Tournaments ===
Date	Location	Country	Event	Winner	Runner-up	Ref
February 28-March 12	Gold Coast	Australia	Quiksilver Pro	Kelly Slater (USA)	Taj Burrow (AUS)	Report
April 11-April 21	Bells Beach	Australia	Rip Curl Pro	Kelly Slater (USA)	Joel Parkinson (AUS)	Report
May 4-May 16	Teahupoo, Tahiti	French Polynesia	Billabong Pro	Bobby Martinez (USA)	Frederick Patacchia (HAW)	Report
May 21-June 2	Tavarua	Fiji	Globe Pro Fiji	Damien Hobgood (USA)	Shaun Cansdell (AUS)	Report
June 20-July 1	Huatulco	Mexico	Rip Curl Search	Andy Irons (HAW)	Taylor Knox (USA)	Report
July 12-July 22	Jeffreys Bay	South Africa	Billabong Pro	Mick Fanning (AUS)	Taj Burrow (AUS)	Report
September 12-September 16	Trestles	United States	Boost Mobile Pro	Bede Durbidge (AUS)	Kelly Slater (USA)	Report
September 22-October 1	Hossegor	France	Quiksilver Pro	Joel Parkinson (AUS)	Mick Fanning (AUS)	Report
October 2-October 14	Mundaka	Spain	Billabong Pro	Bobby Martinez (USA)	Kelly Slater (USA)	Report
October 30-November 8	Imbituba	Brazil	Nova Schin Festival	Mick Fanning (AUS)	Damien Hobgood (USA)	Report
December 8-December 20	Pipeline, Hawaii	United States	Rip Curl Pipeline Masters	Andy Irons (HAW)	Kelly Slater (USA)	Report

=== Final standings ===
Rank	Name	Country	Points
1	Kelly Slater	United States	8,124
2	Andy Irons	Hawaii	6,948
3	Mick Fanning	Australia	6,828
4	Taj Burrow	Australia	6,480
5	Bobby Martinez	United States	6,350
6	Joel Parkinson	Australia	6,240
7	Damien Hobgood	United States	6,096
8	Tom Whitaker	Australia	5,138
9	Taylor Knox	United States	4,880
10	Dean Morrison	Australia	4,856

== Women's World Tour ==
=== Tournaments ===
Date	Location	Country	Event	Winner	Runner-up	Ref
February 28-March 12	Gold Coast	Australia	Roxy Pro Gold Coast	Melanie Redman-Carr (AUS)	Layne Beachley (AUS)	Report
April 22-April 29	Tavarua	Fiji	Roxy Pro Fiji	Melanie Redman-Carr (AUS)	Layne Beachley (AUS)	Report
May 4-May 16	Teahupoo, Tahiti	French Polynesia	Billabong Pro Tahiti Women	Melanie Redman-Carr (AUS)	Chelsea Georgeson (AUS)	Report
August 21-August 28	Itacaré	Brazil	Billabong Girls Pro	Layne Beachley (AUS)	Jessi Miley-Dyer (AUS)	Report
August 31-September 5	Hossegor	France	Rip Curl Pro Mademoiselle	Chelsea Georgeson (AUS)	Melanie Redman-Carr (AUS)	Report
October 9-October 15	Manly Beach	Australia	Havaianas Beachley Classic	Stephanie Gilmore (AUS)	Layne Beachley (AUS)	Report
November 24-December 6	Sunset Beach, Hawaii	United States	Roxy Pro	Melanie Bartels (HAW)	Stephanie Gilmore (AUS)	Report
December 8-December 20	Honolua Bay, Hawaii	United States	Billabong Pro	Jessi Miley-Dyer (AUS)	Keala Kennelly (HAW)	Report

=== Final standings ===
Rank	Name	Country	Points
1	Layne Beachley	Australia	6,374
2	Melanie Redman-Carr	Australia	5,802
3	Chelsea Georgeson	Australia	5,797
4	Jessi Miley-Dyer	Australia	4,440
5	Sofía Mulánovich	Peru	4,105
6	Rebecca Woods	Australia	3,794
7	Claire Bevilacqua	Australia	3,564
8	Keala Kennelly	Hawaii	3,516
9	Silvana Lima	Brazil	3,408
10	Megan Abubo	Hawaii	3,398
