= Quiksilver Pro France 2015 =

2015 professional surfing event

Quiksilver Pro France 2015 at the Surf
- Location: Hossegor (Landes forest) (FRA)
- Dates: 06 to 17 October
- Competitors: 36 from 9 nations

Medalists
gold medal	Gabriel Medina	Brazil
silver medal	Bede Durbidge	Australia

The Quiksilver Pro France 2015 was an event of the Association of Surfing Professionals for the 2015 ASP World Tour.

This event was held from 06 to 17 October at Seignosse, near Soorts-Hossegor (Landes forest) in the Landes department, Aquitaine, France on Atlantic Europe. There was the participation of 36 surfers.

The tournament final was won by Gabriel Medina (BRA) earning $100,000 (USD), who beat Bede Durbidge (AUS), earning $40,000.

== Round 1 ==
Heat 1
1	Brett Simpson	(United States)	14.84
2	Kelly Slater	(United States)	14.84
3	Jadson Andre	(Brazil)	10.90

Heat 2
1	Julian Wilson	(Australia)	18.80
2	Miguel Pupo	(Brazil)	10.83
3	Aritz Aranburu	(Spain)	5.66

Heat 3
1	Dane Reynolds	(United States)	17.00
2	Sebastian Zietz	(Hawaii)	15.90
3	Owen Wright	(Australia)	8.94

Heat 4
1	Tomas Hermes	(Brazil)	11.57
2	Adan Melling	(Australia)	10.97
3	Filipe Toledo	(Brazil)	9.93

Heat 5
1	A. de Souza	(Brazil)	16.00
2	Caio Ibelli	(Brazil)	6.37
3	Keanu Asing	(Hawaii)	4.97

Heat 6
1	Mick Fanning	(Australia)	16.73
2	Michel Bourez	(French Polynesia)	10.73
3	M. Huscenot	(France)	8.87

Heat 7
1	Gabriel Medina	(Brazil)	14.33
2	Matt Wilkinson	(Australia)	6.76
3	Dusty Payne	(Hawaii)	4.33

Heat 8
1	John Florence	(Hawaii)	16.60
2	Alejo Muniz	(Brazil)	10.93
3	Jérémy Florès	(France)	2.83

Heat 9
1	Adrian Buchan	(Australia)	18.40
2	Italo Ferreira	(Brazil)	14.84
3	Ricardo Christie	(New Zealand)	9.50

Heat 10
1	Bede Durbidge	(Australia)	13.70
2	Glenn Hall	(Republic of Ireland)	6.43
3	Nat Young	(United States)	4.67

Heat 11
1	Kolohe Andino	(United States)	14.40
2	Kai Otton	(Australia)	11.10
3	Josh Kerr	(Australia)	9.90

Heat 12
1	C. J. Hobgood	(United States)	15.43
2	Wiggolly Dantas	(Brazil)	10.73
3	Joel Parkinson	(Australia)	10.50

== Round 2 ==
Heat 1: 1 / M. Huscenot / (France) / 6.10; 2 / Filipe Toledo / (Brazil) / 5.90	Heat 2: 1 / Owen Wright / (Australia) / 14.57; 2 / Caio Ibelli / (Brazil) / 12.07	Heat 3: 1 / Kelly Slater / (United States) / 17.37; 2 / Aritz Aranburu / (Spain) / 1.93	Heat 4: 1 / Jérémy Florès / (France) / 10.56; 2 / Dusty Payne / (Hawaii) / 1.33

Heat 5: 1 / Italo Ferreira / (Brazil) / W.O.; 2 / Alejo Muniz / (Brazil) / INJ	Heat 6: 1 / Nat Young / (United States) / 12.66; 2 / Ricardo Christie / (New Zealand) / 12.27	Heat 7: 1 / Josh Kerr / (Australia) / 9.60; 2 / Glenn Hall / (Republic of Ireland) / 7.16	Heat 8: 1 / Michel Bourez / (French Polynesia) / 7.67; 2 / Wiggolly Dantas / (Brazil) / 6.40

Heat 9: 1 / Keanu Asing / (Hawaii) / 11.17; 2 / Joel Parkinson / (Australia) / 2.86	Heat 10: 1 / Kai Otton / (Australia) / 12.00; 2 / Adan Melling / (Australia) / 7.17	Heat 11: 1 / Matt Wilkinson / (Australia) / 10.17; 2 / Sebastian Zietz / (Hawaii) / 8.16	Heat 12: 1 / Jadson Andre / (Brazil) / 9.20; 2 / Miguel Pupo / (Brazil) / 9.20

== Round 3 ==
Heat 1: 1 / Julian Wilson / (Australia) / 11.17; 2 / Brett Simpson / (United States) / 10.34	Heat 2: 1 / Jadson Andre / (Brazil) / 13.07; 2 / Nat Young / (United States) / 12.97	Heat 3: 1 / Kolohe Andino / (United States) / 15.77; 2 / Kelly Slater / (United States) / 14.20	Heat 4: 1 / Italo Ferreira / (Brazil) / 13.60; 2 / Keanu Asing / (Hawaii) / 13.10

Heat 5: 1 / Bede Durbidge / (Australia) / 18.37; 2 / Adrian Buchan / (Australia) / 17.40	Heat 6: 1 / Mick Fanning / (Australia) / 17.83; 2 / M. Huscenot / (France) / 16.04	Heat 7: 1 / A. de Souza / (Brazil) / 14.17; 2 / Tomas Hermes / (Brazil) / 12.73	Heat 8: 1 / John Florence / (Hawaii) / 16.33; 2 / Kai Otton / (Australia) / 15.33

Heat 9: 1 / Jérémy Florès / (France) / 10.46; 2 / Michel Bourez / (French Polynesia) / 10.14	Heat 10: 1 / Gabriel Medina / (Brazil) / 18.70; 2 / C. J. Hobgood / (United States) / 14.23	Heat 11: 1 / Matt Wilkinson / (Australia) / 16.00; 2 / Josh Kerr / (Australia) / 12.50	Heat 12: 1 / Owen Wright / (Australia) / 14.83; 2 / Dane Reynolds / (United States) / 10.97

== Round 4 ==
Heat 1
1	Julian Wilson	(Australia)	17.37
2	Jadson Andre	(Brazil)	12.93
3	Kolohe Andino	(United States)	10.47

Heat 2
1	Mick Fanning	(Australia)	16.67
2	Bede Durbidge	(Australia)	15.43
3	Italo Ferreira	(Brazil)	13.73

Heat 3
1	A. de Souza	(Brazil)	18.50
2	Jérémy Florès	(France)	14.00
3	John Florence	(Hawaii)	13.37

Heat 4
1	Gabriel Medina	(Brazil)	19.83
2	Matt Wilkinson	(Australia)	16.00
3	Owen Wright	(Australia)	15.53

== Round 5 ==
Heat 1: 1 / Italo Ferreira / (Brazil) / 16.23; 2 / Jadson Andre / (Brazil) / 15.07	Heat 2: 1 / Bede Durbidge / (Australia) / 18.30; 2 / Kolohe Andino / (United States) / 10.20	Heat 3: 1 / Owen Wright / (Australia) / 18.50; 2 / Jérémy Florès / (France) / 16.17	Heat 4: 1 / John Florence / (Hawaii) / 16.80; 2 / Matt Wilkinson / (Australia) / 14.87

== Quarter finals ==
Heat 1: 1 / Julian Wilson / (Australia) / 17.00; 2 / Italo Ferreira / (Brazil) / 9.00	Heat 2: 1 / Bede Durbidge / (Australia) / 14.10; 2 / Mick Fanning / (Australia) / 12.57	Heat 3: 1 / A. de Souza / (Brazil) / 15.37; 2 / Owen Wright / (Australia) / 13.83	Heat 4: 1 / Gabriel Medina / (Brazil) / 14.43; 2 / John Florence / (Hawaii) / 13.10

== Semi finals ==
Heat 1: 1 / Bede Durbidge / (Australia) / 11.73; 2 / Julian Wilson / (Australia) / 10.84	Heat 2: 1 / Gabriel Medina / (Brazil) / 15.67; 2 / A. de Souza / (Brazil) / 12.50

== Final ==
Heat 1
1	Gabriel Medina	(Brazil)	17.50
2	Bede Durbidge	(Australia)	9.44
