= Vasco Ribeiro =

Portuguese professional surfer

Personal information
- Born: 22 November 1994 (age 31) Cascais, Portugal
- Height: 1.80 m (5 ft 11 in)
- Weight: 84 kg (185 lb)

Surfing career
- Sport: Surfing
- Best year: 2015
- Career earnings: $179,200
- Major achievements: 2014 WSL World Junior Champion; 5× Portuguese National Champion (2011, 2012, 2014, 2017, 2021)

Surfing specifications
- Stance: Regular (natural foot)
Medal record
World Games
Bronze medal – third place	2021 La Libertad	Team

Vasco Babel Ribeiro Pessoa (born 22 November 1994) is a Portuguese professional surfer. Currently he's competing inn the WSL Men's Qualifying Series, mostly known as the QS which allows 10 surfers every year to qualify for the main competition, the Championship Tour. At club level he represents Estoril Praia.

== Career ==
In 2014, Vasco won the 2014 World Junior Championships, becoming the first Portuguese junior world champion in surfing.

He won the Liga MEO Surf, the Portuguese national championship, for a five time record, winning it in 2011, 2012, 2014, 2017 and 2021.

Vasco Ribeiro was banned for three years after he refused a drug test in 2022.

=== WSL World Championship Tour ===
Tournament	2015	2016	2017
Quiksilver Pro Gold Coast	-	-	-
Rip Curl Pro	-	-	-
Margaret River Pro	-	-	-
Rio Pro	-	-	-
Fiji Pro	-	-	-
J-Bay Open	-	-	-
Billabong Pro Teahupoo	-	-	-
Hurley Pro at Trestles	-	-	-
Quiksilver Pro France	-	-	-
MEO Rip Curl Pro Portugal	3rd	DNQ	13th
Billabong Pipeline Masters	-	-	-
Rank	38th	DNC	39th
Earnings	$20,000	$0	$11,500
