= J-Bay Open 2015 =

J-Bay Open 2015 at the Surf
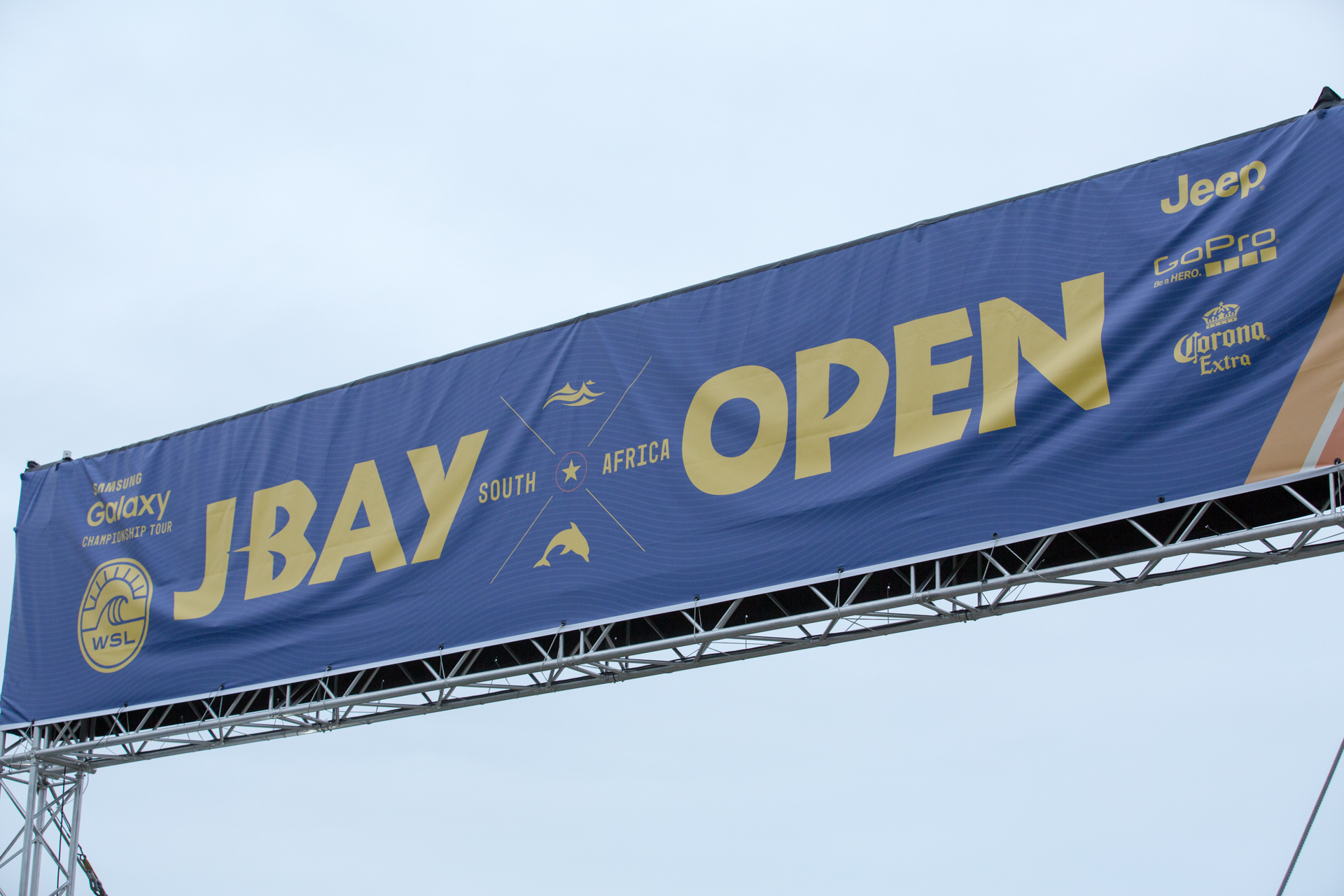
- Location: Jeffreys Bay (ZAF)
- Dates: 08 to 19 Jul
- Competitors: 36 from 9 nations

The J-Bay Open 2015 was an event of the World Surf League Championship Tour.

This event was held from 8-19 July 2015 at Jeffreys Bay, (Eastern Cape, South Africa) with 36 professional surfers.

The final of the tournament was canceled because Mick Fanning was attacked by a shark.

Mick Fanning (AUS) and Julian Wilson (AUS) were second, because of the attack.

== Round 1 ==
Heat 1
1	Michel Bourez	(French Polynesia)	12.00
2	Brett Simpson	(United States)	7.84
3	Taj Burrow	(Australia)	5.26

Heat 2
1	Julian Wilson	(Australia)	13.93
2	Alejo Muniz	(Brazil)	12.27
3	Miguel Pupo	(Brazil)	5.60

Heat 3
1	C. J. Hobgood	(United States)	13.70
2	Owen Wright	(Australia)	12.86
3	Kai Otton	(Australia)	9.72

Heat 4
1	Dane Reynolds	(United States)	13.33
2	Adan Melling	(Australia)	7.00
3	Filipe Toledo	(Brazil)	5.33

Heat 5
1	Mick Fanning	(Australia)	15,67
2	Michel February	(South Africa)	11.33
3	Tomas Hermes	(Brazil)	7.66

Heat 6
1	Kolohe Andino	(United States)	14.03
2	A. de Souza	(Brazil)	13.24
3	Slade Prestwich	(South Africa)	10.33

Heat 7
1	Josh Kerr	(Australia)	12.94
2	Dusty Payne	(Hawaii)	10.14
3	Sebastian Zietz	(Hawaii)	7.74

Heat 8
1	Kelly Slater	(United States)	17.00
2	Matt Wilkinson	(Australia)	9.33
3	Glenn Hall	(Republic of Ireland)	5.40

Heat 9
1	Adrian Buchan	(Australia)	12.60
2	Nat Young	(United States)	10.00
3	Wiggolly Dantas	(Brazil)	8.87

Heat 10
1	F. Patacchia	(Hawaii)	14.90
2	Jadson Andre	(Brazil)	14.60
3	Italo Ferreira	(Brazil)	10.53

Heat 11
1	Bede Durbidge	(Australia)	14.00
2	Ricardo Christie	(New Zealand)	6.70
3	Jordy Smith	(South Africa)	5.17

Heat 12
1	Keanu Asing	(Hawaii)	13.93
2	Joel Parkinson	(Australia)	13.27
3	Gabriel Medina	(Brazil)	9.00

== Round 2 ==
Heat 1: 1 / A. de Souza / (Brazil) / 14.33; 2 / Slade Prestwich / (South Africa) / 13.04	Heat 2: 1 / Filipe Toledo / (Brazil) / 12.00; 2 / Michel February / (South Africa) / 8.00	Heat 3: 1 / Owen Wright / (Australia) / 16.17; 2 / Tomas Hermes / (Brazil) / 13.77	Heat 4: 1 / Alejo Muniz / (Brazil) / 18.83; 2 / Taj Burrow / (Australia) / 15.83

Heat 5: 1 / Nat Young / (United States) / 17.10; 2 / Brett Simpson / (United States) / 12.10	Heat 6: 1 / Italo Ferreira / (Brazil) / 15.96; 2 / Dusty Payne / (Hawaii) / 15.16	Heat 7: 1 / Gabriel Medina / (Brazil) / 16.00; 2 / Glenn Hall / (Republic of Ireland) / 5.40	Heat 8: 1 / Joel Parkinson / (Australia) / 18.84; 2 / Ricardo Christie / (New Zealand) / 18.13

Heat 9: 1 / Adan Melling / (Australia) / 14.90; 2 / Jordy Smith / (South Africa) / 8.03	Heat 10: 1 / Kai Otton / (Australia) / 18.10; 2 / Jadson Andre / (Brazil) / 17.07	Heat 11: 1 / Wiggolly Dantas / (Brazil) / 17.77; 2 / Miguel Pupo / (Brazil) / 15.23	Heat 12: 1 / Matt Wilkinson / (Australia) / 14.80; 2 / Sebastian Zietz / (Hawaii) / 13.93

== Round 3 ==
Heat 1: 1 / Adrian Buchan / (Australia) / 15.50; 2 / Owen Wright / (Australia) / 15.40	Heat 2: 1 / Kai Otton / (Australia) / 15.50; 2 / Italo Ferreira / (Brazil) / 12.83	Heat 3: 1 / Julian Wilson / (Australia) / 17.94; 2 / F. Patacchia / (Hawaii) / 8.40	Heat 4: 1 / Nat Young / (United States) / 16.87; 2 / Adan Melling / (Australia) / 8.83

Heat 5: 1 / Wiggolly Dantas / (Brazil) / 15.13; 2 / Joel Parkinson / (Australia) / 12.40	Heat 6: 1 / A. de Souza / (Brazil) / 13.17; 2 / Dane Reynolds / (United States) / 11.90	Heat 7: 1 / Mick Fanning / (Australia) / 17.50; 2 / C. J. Hobgood / (United States) / 13.83	Heat 8: 1 / Gabriel Medina / (Brazil) / 19.17; 2 / Matt Wilkinson / (Australia) / 16.07

Heat 9: 1 / Kelly Slater / (United States) / 14.16; 2 / Kolohe Andino / (United States) / 12.27	Heat 10: 1 / Keanu Asing / (Hawaii) / 14.83; 2 / Josh Kerr / (Australia) / 12.33	Heat 11: 1 / Michel Bourez / (French Polynesia) / 15.67; 2 / Bede Durbidge / (Australia) / 15.67	Heat 12: 1 / Alejo Muniz / (Brazil) / 17.83; 2 / Filipe Toledo / (Brazil) / 17.23

== Round 4 ==
Heat 1
1	Adrian Buchan	(Australia)	13.70
2	Kai Otton	(Australia)	13.50
3	Julian Wilson	(Australia)	7.77

Heat 2
1	A. de Souza	(Brazil)	13.00
2	Wiggolly Dantas	(Brazil)	12.57
3	Nat Young	(United States)	8.77

Heat 3
1	Gabriel Medina	(Brazil)	12.90
2	Kelly Slater	(United States)	12.27
3	Mick Fanning	(Australia)	9.94

Heat 4
1	Alejo Muniz	(Brazil)	14.34
2	Keanu Asing	(Hawaii)	14.04
3	Michel Bourez	(French Polynesia)	11.27

== Round 5 ==
Heat 1: 1 / Kai Otton / (Australia) / 16.60; 2 / Nat Young / (United States) / 11.34	Heat 2: 1 / Julian Wilson / (Australia) / 18.67; 2 / Wiggolly Dantas / (Brazil) / 13.83	Heat 3: ''1 / Kelly Slater / (United States) / 17.53; 2 / Michel Bourez / (French Polynesia) / 15.00	Heat 4: 1 / Mick Fanning / (Australia) / 15.90; 2 / Keanu Asing / (Hawaii) / 14.87

== Quarter finals ==
Heat 1: 1 / Adrian Buchan / (Australia) / 18.00; 2 / Kai Otton / (Australia) / 15.67	Heat 2: 1 / Julian Wilson / (Australia) / 15.53; 2 / A. de Souza / (Brazil) / 12.33	Heat 3: 1 / Kelly Slater / (United States) / 18.10; 2 / Gabriel Medina / (Brazil) / 17.23	Heat 4: 1 / Mick Fanning / (Australia) / 18.17; 2 / Alejo Muniz / (Brazil) / 9.00

== Semi finals ==
Heat 1: 1 / Julian Wilson / (Australia) / 16.40; 2 / Adrian Buchan / (Australia) / 15.20	Heat 2: 1 / Mick Fanning / (Australia) / 18.13; 2 / Kelly Slater / (United States) / 16.23

== Final ==
Heat 1
2	Julian Wilson	(Australia)	Cancelled
2	Mick Fanning	(Australia)	Cancelled
