= Billabong Pipeline Masters 2015 =

Billabong Pipeline Masters 2015 at the Surf
- Location: Banzai Pipeline (HAW)
- Dates: 8 to 20 Dezember
- Competitors: 36 from 8 nations

The Billabong Pipeline Masters 2015 is an event of the Association of Surfing Professionals for 2015 ASP World Tour.

This event will be held from 8 to 20 May at Banzai Pipeline, (Hawaii, United States) and opposed by 36 surfers.

== Round 1 ==
Heat 1
1	Italo Ferreira	(Brazil)	14.26
2	Adrian Buchan	(Australia)	9.33
1	Glenn Hall	(Republic of Ireland)	1.70

Heat 2
1	Mason Ho	(Hawaii)	6.17
2	Jadson Andre	(Brazil)	5.70
3	Dusty Payne	(Hawaii)	1.70

Heat 3
1	Gabriel Medina	(Brazil)	12.60
2	Keanu Asing	(Hawaii)	7.84
3	Wade Carmichael	(Australia)	3.73

Heat 4
1	Michel Bourez	(French Polynesia)	9.33
2	A. de Souza	(Brazil)	7.23
3	Jack Robinson	(Australia)	5.06

Heat 5
1	Jamie O'Brien	(Hawaii)	8.06
2	Filipe Toledo	(Brazil)	7.84
3	Kolohe Andino	(United States)	6.50

Heat 6
1	Mick Fanning	(Australia)	14.60
2	Bruce Irons	(Hawaii)	14.33
3	Sebastian Zietz	(Hawaii)	4.17

Heat 7
1	Kai Otton	(Australia)	12.40
2	Julian Wilson	(Australia)	3.84
3	Ricardo Christie	(New Zealand)	3.10

Heat 8
1	Jérémy Florès	(France)	11.27
2	Jordy Smith	(South Africa)	7.17
3	Matt Wilkinson	(Australia)	3.94

Heat 9
1	C. J. Hobgood	(United States)	14.97
2	Taj Burrow	(Australia)	11.26
3	Kelly Slater	(United States)	9.80

Heat 10
1	John Florence	(Hawaii)	13.33
2	Nat Young	(United States)	6.67
3	Brett Simpson	(United States)	1.50

Heat 11
1	Bede Durbidge	(Australia)	2.84
2	Adam Melling	(Australia)	1.14
3	Wiggolly Dantas	(Brazil)	1.10

Heat 12
1	Josh Kerr	(Australia)	13.06
2	Joel Parkinson	(Australia)	12.17
3	Miguel Pupo	(Brazil)	3.44

== Round 2 ==
Heat 1: 1 / Filipe Toledo / (Brazil) / 14.23; 2 / Bruce Irons / (Hawaii) / 5.07	Heat 2: 1 / Taj Burrow / (Australia) / 13.77; 2 / Brett Simpson / (United States) / 11.20	Heat 3: 1 / A. de Souza / (Brazil) / 13.10; 2 / Jack Robinson / (Australia) / 12.50	Heat 4: 1 / Adam Melling / (Australia) / 15.15; 2 / Matt Wilkinson / (Australia) / 4.46

Heat 5: 1 / Julian Wilson / (Australia) / 12.83; 2 / Wade Carmichael / (Australia) / 6.00	Heat 6: 1 / Adrian Buchan / (Australia) / 13.17; 2 / Miguel Pupo / (Brazil) / 6.50	Heat 7: 1 / Kelly Slater / (United States) / 15.57; 2 / Dusty Payne / (Hawaii) / 14.93	Heat 8: 1 / Sebastian Zietz / (Hawaii) / 10.50; 2 / Jadson Andre / (Brazil) / 6.74

Heat 9: 1 / Glenn Hall / (Republic of Ireland) / 8.60; 2 / Nat Young / (United States) / 7.80	Heat 10: 1 / Keanu Asing / (Hawaii) / 10.33; 2 / Kolohe Andino / (United States) / 4.90	Heat 11: 1 / Joel Parkinson / (Australia) / 13.93; 2 / Ricardo Christie / (New Zealand) / 5.43	Heat 12: 1 / Jordy Smith / (South Africa) / 16.00; 2 / Wiggolly Dantas / (Brazil) / 4.87

== Round 3 ==
Heat 1: 1 / Gabriel Medina / (Brazil) / 15.84; 2 / Jordy Smith / (South Africa) / 4.50	Heat 2: 1 / Keanu Asing / (Hawaii) / 5.00; 2 / Bede Durbidge / (Australia) / 0.17	Heat 3: 1 / C. J. Hobgood / (United States) / 6.74; 2 / Italo Ferreira / (Brazil) / 4.57	Heat 4: 1 / Kelly Slater / (United States) / 13.43; 2 / Michel Bourez / (French Polynesia) / 7.00

Heat 5: 1 / Mick Fanning / (Australia) / 12.14; 2 / Jamie O'Brien / (Hawaii) / 2.70	Heat 6: 1 / John Florence / (Hawaii) / 19.26; 2 / Taj Burrow / (Australia) / 1.83	Heat 7: 1 / Mason Ho / (Hawaii) / 6.93; 2'' / Filipe Toledo / (Brazil) / 6.67	Heat 8: 1 / Joel Parkinson / (Australia) / 10.86; 2 / Kai Otton / (Australia) / 5.40

Heat 9: 1 / Jérémy Florès / (France) / 14.44; 2 / Sebastian Zietz / (Hawaii) / 14.23	Heat 10: 1 / Adam Melling / (Australia) / 15.73; 2 / Julian Wilson / (Australia) / 15.16	Heat 11: 1 / Josh Kerr / (Australia) / 7.67; 2 / Adrian Buchan / (Australia) / 3.20	Heat 12: 1 / A. de Souza / (Brazil) / 10.00; 2 / Glenn Hall / (Republic of Ireland) / 4.70

== Round 4 ==
Heat 1
1	Gabriel Medina	(Brazil)	15.30
2	C. J. Hobgood	(United States)	5.47
3	Keanu Asing	(Hawaii)	4.27

Heat 2
1	Mick Fanning	(Australia)	17.30
2	Kelly Slater	(United States)	16.47
3	John Florence	(Hawaii)	15.16

Heat 3
Mason Ho	(Hawaii)	16.23
Joel Parkinson	(Australia)	15.03
Jérémy Florès	(France)	10.24

Heat 4
A. de Souza	(Brazil)	13.67
Josh Kerr	(Australia)	12.13
Adam Melling	(Australia)	1.43

== Round 5 ==
Heat 1: 1 / C. J. Hobgood / (United States) / 13.34; 2 / John Florence / (Hawaii) / 9.76	Heat 2: 1 / Kelly Slater / (United States) / 17.07; 2 / Keanu Asing / (Hawaii) / 9.77	Heat 3: 1 / Adam Melling / (Australia) / 5.17; 2 / Joel Parkinson / (Australia) / 4.20	Heat 4: 1 / Josh Kerr / (Australia) / 13.83; 2 / Jérémy Florès / (France) / 7.73

== Quarter finals ==
Heat 1: 1 / Gabriel Medina / (Brazil) / 11.67; 2 / CJ Hobgood / (United States) / 4.67	Heat 2: 1 / Mick Fanning / (Australia) / 9.50; 2 / Kelly Slater / (United States) / 6.17	Heat 3: 1 / Mason Ho / (Hawaii) / 8.03; 2 / Adam Melling / (Australia) / 4.53	Heat 4: 1 / A. de Souza / (Brazil) / 5.50; 2 / Josh Kerr / (Australia) / 4.43

== Semi finals ==
Heat 1: 1 / Gabriel Medina / (Brazil) / 11.83; 2 / Mick Fanning / (Australia) / 10.36	Heat 2: 1 / A. de Souza / (Brazil) / 6.83; 2 / Mason Ho / (Hawaii) / 3.83

== Final ==
Heat 1
1	A. de Souza	(Brazil)	14.07
2	Gabriel Medina	(Brazil)	8.05
