= Fiji Pro 2017 =

Fiji Pro 2017 at the Surf
- Location: Namotu (FJI)
- Dates: 05 to 17 June
- Competitors: 36 from 8 nations

Medalists
gold medal	Matt Wilkinson	Australia
silver medal	C. O'Leary	Australia

The Fiji Pro 2017 was an event of the World Surf League for 2017 World Surf League.

This event was held from 07 to 19 June at Namotu, (Tavarua, Fiji) and 36 surfers participated.

== Round 1 ==
Heat 1
1	Italo Ferreira	(Brazil)	11.43
2	Kolohe Andino	(United States)	11.00
3	Joan Duru	(France)	3.94

Heat 2
1	Matt Wilkinson	(Australia)	12.50
2	Jérémy Florès	(France)	7.74
3	Ethan Ewing	(Australia)	6.90

Heat 3
1	Owen Wright	(Australia)	14.00
2	L. Fioravanti	(Italy)	12.60
3	Ezekiel Lau	(Hawaii)	8.17

Heat 4
1	A. de Souza	(Brazil)	10.83
2	Kanoa Igarashi	(United States)	7.43
3	Bino Lopes	(Brazil)	3.30

Heat 5
1	Jordy Smith	(South Africa)	12.16
2	Yago Dora	(Brazil)	9.43
3	Jack Freestone	(Australia)	5.10

Heat 6
1	John Florence	(Hawaii)	14.84
2	Tevita Gukilau	(United States)	10.17
3	Josh Kerr	(Australia)	8.33

Heat 7
1	F. Morais	(Portugal)	10.44
2	Jadson Andre	(Brazil)	9.33
3	Joel Parkinson	(Australia)	8.60

Heat 8
1	Gabriel Medina	(Brazil)	12.00
2	Nat Young	(United States)	7.43
3	W. Dantas	(Brazil)	5.63

Heat 9
1	Julian Wilson	(Australia)	16.33
2	Conner Coffin	(United States)	15.27
3	Stuart Kennedy	(Australia)	8.90

Heat 10
1	C. O'Leary	(Australia)	11.00
2	Ian Gouveia	(Brazil)	9.27
3	Sebastian Zietz	(Hawaii)	8.34

Heat 11
1	Michel Bourez	(French Polynesia)	18.70
2	Miguel Pupo	(Brazil)	17.50
3	Adrian Buchan	(Australia)	12.33

Heat 12
1	Mick Fanning	(Australia)	13.93
2	Bede Durbidge	(Australia)	9.13
3	Kelly Slater	(United States)	5.20

== Round 2 ==
Heat 1: 1 / Kolohe Andino / (United States) / 13.50; 2 / Tevita Gukilau / (United States) / 4.16	Heat 2: 1 / Joel Parkinson / (Australia) / 10.66; 2 / Yago Dora / (Brazil) / 10.33	Heat 3: 1 / Sebastian Zietz / (Hawaii) / 18.43; 2 / Bino Lopes / (Brazil) / 9.53	Heat 4: 1 / L. Fioravanti / (Italy) / 12.26; 2 / Adrian Buchan / (Australia) / 11.87

Heat 5: 1 / Kelly Slater / (United States) / 15.53; 2 / Ethan Ewing / (Australia) / 9.00	Heat 6: 1 / Joan Duru / (France) / 13.00; 2 / Conner Coffin / (United States) / 10.30	Heat 7: 1 / W. Dantas / (Brazil) / 14.77; 2 / Jadson Andre / (Brazil) / 12.27	Heat 8: 1 / Jérémy Florès / (France) / 17.50; 2 / Nat Young / (United States) / 11.10

Heat 9: 1 / Stuart Kennedy / (Australia) / 10.74; 2 / Ezekiel Lau / (Hawaii) / 9.10	Heat 10: 1 / Ian Gouveia / (Brazil) / 15.10; 2 / Kanoa Igarashi / (United States) / 7.13	Heat 11: 1 / Miguel Pupo / (Brazil) / 12.00; 2 / Jack Freestone / (Australia) / 9.23	Heat 12: 1 / Bede Durbidge / (Australia) / 13.10; 2 / Josh Kerr / (Australia) / 9.40

== Round 3 ==
Heat 1: 1 / Ian Gouveia / (Brazil) / 15.66; 2 / Owen Wright / (Australia) / 15.26	Heat 2: 1 / Julian Wilson / (Australia) / 15.04; 2 / F. Morais / (Portugal) / 10.20	Heat 3: 1 / Matt Wilkinson / (Australia) / 16.84; 2 / Miguel Pupo / (Brazil) / 5.67	Heat 4: 1 / Italo Ferreira / (Brazil) / 15.83; 2 / Gabriel Medina / (Brazil) / 15.47

Heat 5: 1 / Michel Bourez / (French Polynesia) / 13.53; 2 / Mick Fanning / (Australia) / 11.20	Heat 6: 1 / L. Fioravanti / (Italy) / 16.83; 2 / John Florence / (Hawaii) / 13.33	Heat 7: 1 / Joan Duru / (France) / 17.60; 2 / Jordy Smith / (South Africa) / 11.73	Heat 8: 1 / C. O'Leary / (Australia) / 10.74; 2 / Kelly Slater / (United States) / 10.34

Heat 9: 1 / Joel Parkinson / (Australia) / 15.30; 2 / Jérémy Florès / (France) / 13.84	Heat 10: 1 / Bede Durbidge / (Australia) / 16.10; 2 / Kolohe Andino / (United States) / 11.90	Heat 11: 1 / Sebastian Zietz / (Hawaii) / 12.93; 2 / W. Dantas / (Brazil) / 12.80	Heat 12: 1 / Stuart Kennedy / (Australia) / 14.83; 2 / A. de Souza / (Brazil) / 14.33

== Round 4 ==
Heat 1
1	Matt Wilkinson	(Australia)	14.27
2	Julian Wilson	(Australia)	13.93
3	Ian Gouveia	(Brazil)	10.40

Heat 2
1	Michel Bourez	(French Polynesia)	15.73
2	L. Fioravanti	(Italy)	10.77
3	Italo Ferreira	(Brazil)	8.50

Heat 3
1	C. O'Leary	(Australia)	13.66
2	Joan Duru	(France)	13.50
3	Joel Parkinson	(Australia)	10.83

Heat 4
1	Bede Durbidge	(Australia)	11.10
2	Stuart Kennedy	(Australia)	5.84
3	Sebastian Zietz	(Hawaii)	4.47

== Round 5 ==
Heat 1: 1 / Julian Wilson / (Australia) / 13.34; 2 / Italo Ferreira / (Brazil) / 7.34	Heat 2: 1 / L. Fioravanti / (Italy) / 14.83; 2 / Ian Gouveia / (Brazil) / 11.33	Heat 3: 1 / Joan Duru / (France) / 17.30; 2 / Sebastian Zietz / (Hawaii) / 12.50	Heat 4: 1 / Joel Parkinson / (Australia) / 12.57; 2 / Stuart Kennedy / (Australia) / 12.36

== Quarter finals ==
Heat 1: 1 / Matt Wilkinson / (Australia) / 17.00; 2 / Julian Wilson / (Australia) / 16.30	Heat 2: 1 / Michel Bourez / (French Polynesia) / 17.80; 2 / L. Fioravanti / (Italy) / 13.57	Heat 3: 1 / C. O'Leary / (Australia) / 11.16; 2 / Joan Duru / (France) / 10.70	Heat 4: 1 / Joel Parkinson / (Australia) / 13.67; 2 / Bede Durbidge / (Australia) / 11.23

== Semi finals ==
Heat 1: 1 / Matt Wilkinson / (Australia) / 14.23; 2 / Michel Bourez / (French Polynesia) / 14.00	Heat 2: 1 / C. O'Leary / (Australia) / 15.70; 2 / Joel Parkinson / (Australia) / 8.36

== Final ==
Heat 1
1	Matt Wilkinson	(Australia)	16.60
2	C. O'Leary	(Australia)	15.70
