= 2005 ASP World Tour =

Professional surfing league season

The 2005 ASP World Tour is a professional competitive surfing league. It is run by the Association of Surfing Professionals.

== Men's World Tour ==
=== Tournaments ===
Date	Location	Country	Event	Winner	Runner-up	Ref
March 1-March 13	Gold Coast	Australia	Quiksilver Pro	Mick Fanning (AUS)	Chris Ward (USA)	Report
March 22-April 1	Bells Beach	Australia	Rip Curl Pro	Trent Munro (AUS)	Andy Irons (HAW)	Report
May 5-May 17	Teahupoo, Tahiti	French Polynesia	Billabong Pro	Kelly Slater (USA)	Damien Hobgood (USA)	Report
May 22-June 3	Tavarua	Fiji	Globe Pro Fiji	Kelly Slater (USA)	C.J. Hobgood (USA)	Report
June 23-July 4	St. Leu, Reunion Island	France	Rip Curl Search	Mick Fanning (AUS)	Phillip MacDonald (AUS)	Report
July 12-July 22	Jeffreys Bay	South Africa	Billabong Pro	Kelly Slater (USA)	Andy Irons (HAW)	Report
August 31-September 7	Chiba	Japan	Quiksilver Pro	Andy Irons (HAW)	Kelly Slater (USA)	Report
September 9-September 20	Trestles	United States	Boost Mobile Pro	Kelly Slater (USA)	Phillip MacDonald (AUS)	Report
September 23-October 3	Hossegor	France	Quiksilver Pro	Andy Irons (HAW)	Damien Hobgood (USA)	Report
-	Mundaka	Spain	Billabong Pro	Event Cancelled		
October 31-November 9	Imbituba	Brazil	Nova Schin Festival	Damien Hobgood (USA)	Victor Ribas (BRA)	Report
December 8-December 20	Pipeline, Hawaii	United States	Rip Curl Pipeline Masters	Andy Irons (HAW)	Mick Fanning (AUS)	Report

=== Final standings ===
Rank	Name	Country	Points
1	Kelly Slater	United States	7,962
2	Andy Irons	Hawaii	7,860
3	Mick Fanning	Australia	6,650
4	Damien Hobgood	United States	6,148
5	Phillip MacDonald	Australia	6,060
6	Trent Munro	Australia	5,748
7	Taj Burrow	Australia	5,512
8	Nathan Hedge	Australia	5,426
9	Bruce Irons	Hawaii	5,294
10	C.J. Hobgood	United States	5,248

== Women's World Tour ==
=== Tournaments ===
Date	Location	Country	Event	Winner	Runner-up	Ref
March 1-March 13	Gold Coast	Australia	Roxy Pro Gold Coast	Stephanie Gilmore (AUS)*	Megan Abubo (HAW)	Report
March 23-March 27	Bells Beach	Australia	SPC Fruit Pro	Sofía Mulánovich (PER)	Serena Brooke (AUS)	Report
April 17-April 22	Tavarua	Fiji	Roxy Pro Fiji	Sofía Mulánovich (PER)	Layne Beachley (AUS)	Report
May 5-May 15	Teahupoo, Tahiti	French Polynesia	Billabong Pro Tahiti	Chelsea Georgeson (AUS)	Melanie Redman-Carr (AUS)	Report
May 21-May 27	Cornwall	England	Roxy Pro	Sofía Mulánovich (PER)	Chelsea Georgeson (AUS)	Report
June 5-June 12	Hossegor	France	Rip Curl Venus Festival	Chelsea Georgeson (AUS)	Rochelle Ballard (HAW)	Report
October 1-October 9	Malibu	United States	Rip Curl Malibu Pro	Trudy Todd (AUS)	Samantha Cornish (AUS)	Report
November 12-November 24	Haleiwa, Hawaii	United States	Roxy Pro	Chelsea Georgeson (AUS)	Claire Bevilacqua (AUS)	Report
December 8-December 19	Honolua Bay, Hawaii	United States	Billabong Pro	Chelsea Georgeson (AUS)	Jacqueline Silva (BRA)	Report

| (*)denotes event wildcard

=== Final standings ===
Rank	Name	Country	Points
1	Chelsea Georgeson	Australia	7,080
2	Sofía Mulánovich	Peru	6,012
3	Melanie Redman-Carr	Australia	4,704
4	Megan Abubo	Hawaii	4,614
5	Layne Beachley	Australia	4,308
6	Trudy Todd	Australia	4,128
7	Rochelle Ballard	Hawaii	4,104
8	Keala Kennelly	Hawaii	3,876
9	Samantha Cornish	Australia	3,786
10	Claire Bevilacqua	Australia	3,720
