= Rip Curl Search =

Surfing competition

- Current season, competition or edition: Rip Curl Searchl 2011
- Sport: Surfing
- Country: International
- Most recent champions: (Brazil) Gabriel Medina (men) (Australia) Stephanie Gilmore (women)
- Most titles: (Australia) Mick Fanning, (Hawaii) Andy Irons (2 Titles) (men) (Australia) Stephanie Gilmore, (Hawaii) Coco Ho (1 Title) (women)

Rip Curl Search formerly known as Rip Curl Search or Rip Curl Pro Search, is a professional surfing competition of the WSL World Tour which took place every year in October and November always in some places around the world, seeking to take the ASP World Tour to new locations and expand surfing. The event was first founded in 2005 as Rip Curl Search.

== Dispute Locations ==
During the years the Rip Curl Search passed through some places in the world. This is a list of where events took place.

Year	Date	Event	Location
2005	June 23 – July 4	(France) Rip Curl Search	St. Leu, Reunion Island, France
2006	June 20 – July 1	(Mexico) Rip Curl Search	Barra de la Cruz, Oaxaca, Mexico
2007	June 20 – July 1	(Chile) Rip Curl Search	Arica, Ex Isla Alacran, Chile
2008	July 30 – August 10	(Indonesia) Rip Curl Pro Search Bali	Uluwatu, Bali, Indonesia
2009	October 19–28	(Portugal) Rip Curl Search	Supertubos, Peniche, Portugal
2010	October 30 – November 10	(Puerto Rico) Rip Curl Search	Middles Beach, Isabela, Puerto Rico
2011	November 1–7	(United States) Rip Curl Search	San Francisco, California, United States

== Naming ==
Since the birth of this competition it had 2 different names.

Name	Years
Rip Curl Search	2005–2007
Rip Curl Pro Search	2008
Rip Curl Search	2009–2011

== Winners ==
Men's
Year	Winner	Score	Runner-up	Score
2011	(Brazil) Gabriel Medina	16.50	(Australia) Joel Parkinson	10.90
2010	(United States) Kelly Slater	18.77	(Australia) Bede Durbidge	14.43
2009	(Australia) Mick Fanning (2)	12.67	(Australia) Bede Durbidge	9.87
2008	(Hawaii) Bruce Irons	17.66	(Hawaii) Freddy Patacchia Jr.	11.16
2007	(Hawaii) Andy Irons (2)	16.84	(United States) Damien Hobgood	8.67
2006	(Hawaii) Andy Irons	16.86	(United States) Taylor Knox	11.33
2005	(Australia) Mick Fanning	17.10	(Australia) Phillip MacDonald	5.30

Women's
Year	Winner	Score	Runner-up	Score
2010	(Australia) Stephanie Gilmore	13.80	(Hawaii) Carissa Moore	11.10
2009	(Hawaii) Coco Ho	15.83	(Australia) Chelsea Hedges	9.37

== See also ==
- World Surf League
- Supertubos
