= Tiago Pires =

Tiago Pires may refer to:

- Tiago Pires (footballer) (born 1987), Portuguese footballer
- Tiago Pires (surfer) (born 1980), Portuguese surfer
