= Jessi Miley-Dyer =

Australian surfer

Personal information
- Born: 29 May 1986 (age 39)
- Height: 5 ft 10 in (178 cm)

Surfing career
- Sport: Surfing
- Best year: 2006–2007

Surfing specifications
- Stance: Goofy

Jessica Candice "Jessi" Miley-Dyer (born 29 May 1986) is an Australian professional surfer. She currently resides in Sydney.

== Early life and education ==
Miley-Dyer grew up in the Sydney suburb of Bronte where she was a champion junior lifeguard. Miley-Dyer attended Sydney Girls High School. She received a UAI of 98 and the Ben Lexcen Sports Scholarship to study at the University of New South Wales.

== Professional surfer ==
Miley-Dyer began surfing at the age of eight and became a professional surfer in 2006, having a very strong performance finishing #4 in the 2006 ASP Women's World Tour. She finished her rookie season by winning the Billabong Pro Maui, beating World Champion Layne Beachley in December 2006.

On March 1, 2021 Miley-Dyer became World Surf League Head of Competition. In June 2025, she stepped down as World Surf League commissioner.
