= Jihad Khodr =

Brazilian surfer

Personal information
- Born: December 30, 1983 (age 42) Matinhos, Paraná, Brazil
- Years active: 2008–present
- Height: 5 ft 8 in (1.73 m)
- Weight: 160 lb (73 kg)

Surfing career
- Sport: Surfing
- Best year: Ranked 11th on the ASP World Tour, 2006
- Career earnings: $227,650.00 (as of 2009)
- Sponsors: Hot Buttered (HB) clothing and eyewear and Goofy footwear

Surfing specifications
- Stance: Regular (natural) foot
- Shaper: Havenga
- Quiver: 6'0"- 7'0" boards
- Favourite waves: Matinaos, Snapper
- Favourite maneuvers: Turns

Jihad Khodr (born December 30, 1983) is a Brazilian professional surfer. He is a former ASP World Tour competitor.

Khodr began his elite tour campaign in 2008. The 2009 season is his 2nd season on tour. His highest ASP World Tour rating was 44th in 2008.

As of 2009 his total career earnings are $227,650.00.

== Personal life ==
Jihad Khodr is a Muslim of Lebanese descent.
