= Bec Woods =

Australian surfer (born 1984)

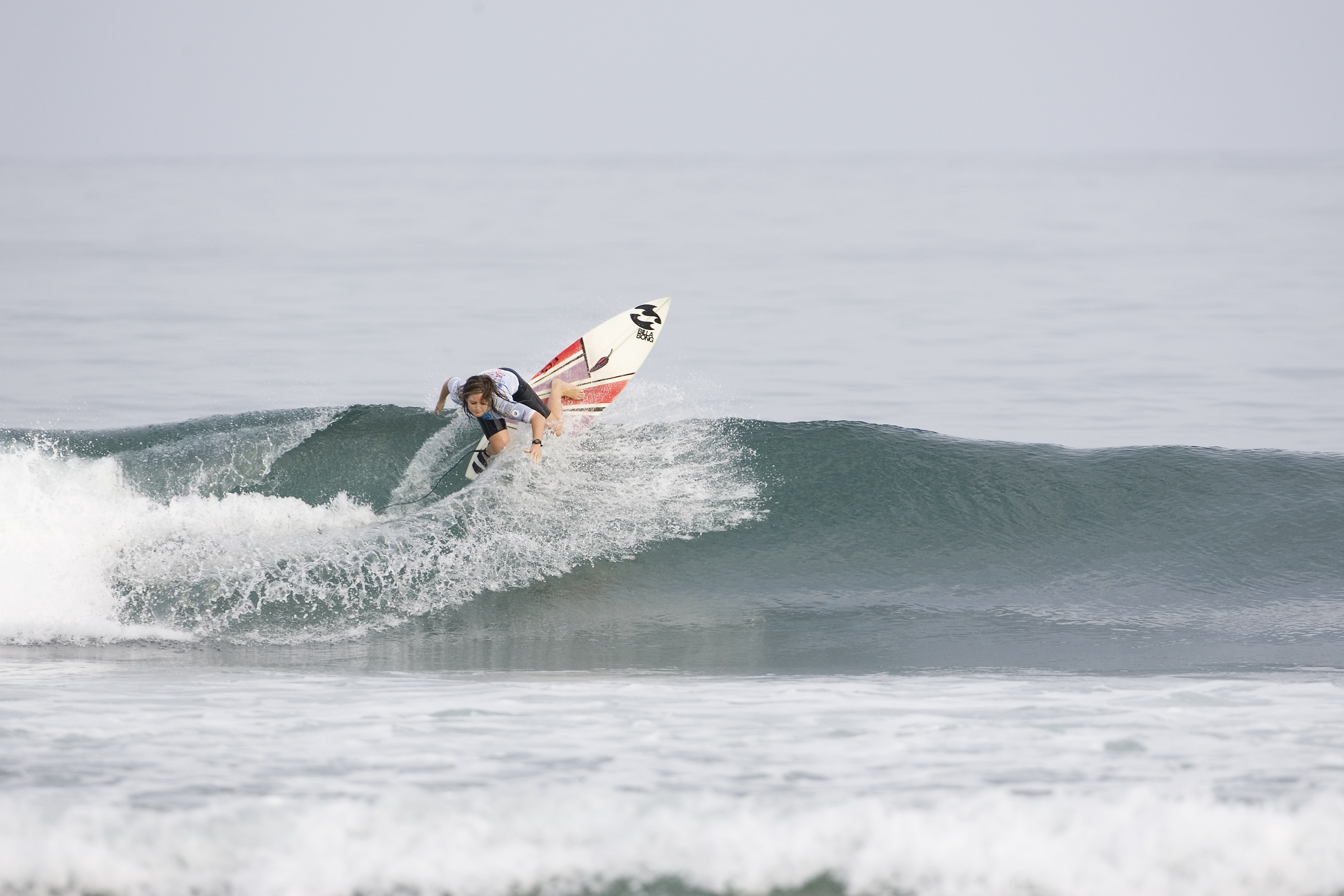

Personal information
- Born: {1984} Copacabana, NSW, Australia
- Height: 5 ft 5 in (1.65 m)
- Weight: 58 kg (128 lb)

Surfing career
- Sponsors: Bounce Foods, Grown Designs Eyewear, Girl Surf Network, FCS Fins.
- Major achievements: 2002 Australian Junior Champion, age 16, 2004 World Junior Champion, age 18

Surfing specifications
- Stance: Regular (natural foot)
- Website: www.becwoods.com

Rebecca 'Bec' Woods (1984) is an Australian professional surfer from Copacabana, New South Wales, Australia.

The 2013 season would be Woods's ninth consecutive year on the Women's ASP World Tour.

Woods won the Australian Junior Surfing Title in 2002 at age 16, then went on to become the World Junior Surfing Champion in 2004 at age 18. She debuted on the elite Women's ASP World Championship Tour in 2005 at age 19.
