= Tim Reyes =

American professional surfer (born 1982)

Personal information
- Born: June 9, 1982 (age 44) West Covina, California, U.S.A.
- Years active: 2005 -present
- Height: 5 ft 7 in (1.70 m)
- Weight: 150 lb (68 kg)

Surfing career
- Sport: Surfing
- Best year: Ranked 11th on the ASP World Tour, 2006
- Career earnings: $310,850.00 (as of 2009)
- Sponsors: O'Neill wetsuits and clothing, Vans, Surftech, Arnette, Firewire Surfboards, P&J Surfboards

Surfing specifications
- Stance: Regular (natural) foot
- Shaper: Nev Hyman
- Quiver: Spitfires, Dominators and Hellfires
- Favorite waves: HB and Lowers
- Favorite maneuvers: Barrels

Tim Reyes (born June 9, 1982) is an American professional surfer. He is competing on the ASP World Tour.

Reyes began his elite tour campaign in 2005. The 2009 season is his 5th season on tour. His highest ASP World Tour rating was 11th in 2006.

As of 2009 his total career earnings are $310,850.00.

== Early life ==
Timothy Charles Reyes Jr. was born June 9, 1982, in West Covina, Los Angeles County, California, to Timothy Charles Reyes Sr. and Julie Hébert. He has a younger sister, Michelle. He began his surfing competitions at age 12 in his own backyard river jetties. At age 13, he was featured in Surfer Magazine for the first time. He graduated from Edison High School in Huntington Beach, California.

== Rating history on the ASP World Tour ==
- 2008: 16th
- 2007: 46th
- 2006: 11th
- 2005: 31st
