= Dayyan Neve =

Australian professional surfer (born 1978)

Personal information
- Born: 31 March 1978 (age 47) Wellington New Zealand
- Height: 1.78 m (5 ft 10 in)
- Weight: 110 kg (240 lb)

Surfing career
- Sport: Surfing
- Best year: 19th - 2008 ASP World Tour Ranking

Surfing specifications
- Stance: Natural (regular) foot

Dayyan Neve (born 31 March 1978) is an Australian professional surfer.

== Surfing ==
=== Victories ===
- 2003 : Salomon Masters, Margaret River, Western Australia (WQS)
- 2003 : Mark Richards Pro, Newcastle, New South Wales

=== WCT ===
- 2008 : 19th
- 2007 : 32nd recovered from its 19th place (WQS)

In 2009 he was nominated as one of Cleo (magazine)'s Bachelor of the Year award.
