= Taylor Knox =

American professional surfer (born 1971)

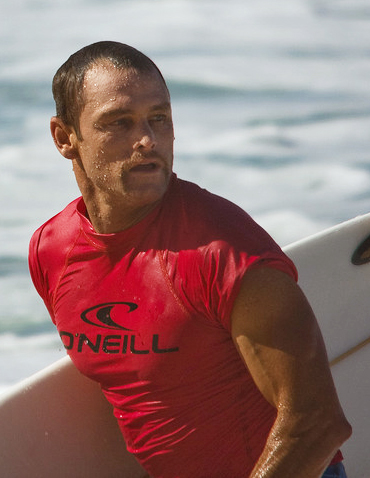
- Taylor Knox in 2009

Personal information
- Born: May 15, 1971 (age 55) Thousand Oaks, California, U.S.
- Years active: 1993 - present
- Height: 5 ft 10 in (178 cm)
- Weight: 170 lb (77 kg)
- Website: ASP World Tour page

Surfing career
- Sport: Surfing
- Best year: Ranked 4th on the ASP World Tour, 2001
- Career earnings: $1,028,422.00 (as of 2011)
- Sponsors: Rip Curl wetsuits and clothing, Reef Sandals and Shoes, Borst Designs surfboards, Detour Protein, OAM accessories and Dragon.
- Major achievements: 1996 ISA World Surfing Games Champion

Surfing specifications
- Stance: Regular (natural) foot
- Shaper: Chris Borst
- Quiver: TKnox
- Favorite waves: Pipeline, Rincon and Restaurants
- Favorite maneuvers: Carves

Taylor Knox (born May 15, 1971) is an American professional surfer.

Knox was born in Thousand Oaks, California and began surfing at 8 years old. He moved with his family to Carlsbad at 13 and continued to pursue his dream of becoming a pro surfer. At age 15, he had to undergo back surgery after a damaged lumbar vertebra from a skateboarding accident threatened to paralyze him. He spent the next six months in a cocoon-like body cast.

In 1990, Knox participated in the World Amateur Championships in Japan. He finished fourth place, ahead of fellow USA teammate Kelly Slater, who placed fifth. He began his ASP World Tour campaign in 1993.

In February 1998, Knox won the inaugural K2 Big-Wave Challenge, an event that offered $50,000 to the surfer who caught the biggest wave of the winter and had photographic evidence. The winning wave was a 52-foot ride at Todos Santos during the Reef Big-Wave World Championships. In 1999 Knox took a one-year hiatus from the World Tour. He returned in 2001 and achieved his highest ASP World Tour rating of 4th place.

In August 2011, Knox was inducted into the Surfers' Hall of Fame at Huntington Beach alongside George Downing and Chuck Linnen. Surfers’ Hall of Fame founder Aaron Pai said Knox had "influenced an entire generation of surfers".

As of 2011, his total career earnings are $1,028,422.00. The 2011 season is his 18th season on tour.

In addition to surfing, Knox was also involved with the video game Left 4 Dead released by Valve in 2008. Taylor Knox provided his face to be used as a reference model for the survivor character Francis.

Taylor's trademark brand of power surfing led to an uncommon surfboard design in 2012 when he worked with Al Merrick to create the Channel Islands Dagger; a surfboard with an abnormally deep double concave and downturned rail. Taylor Knox is known for his ferocious frontside hacks, where he utilized his power and speed to put himself on the most critical sections of the wave.

== Rating history on the ASP World Tour ==
- 2013: Retired
- 2012: 31st
- 2011: 21st
- 2010: 17th
- 2009: 12th
- 2008: 23rd
- 2007: 14th
- 2006: 9th
- 2005: 24th
- 2004: 22nd
- 2003: 7th
- 2002: 25th
- 2001: 4th
- 2000: 28th
- 1998: 35th
- 1997: 18th
- 1996: 6th
- 1995: 5th
- 1994: 20th
- 1993: 24th
