= Claire Bevilacqua =

Australian surfer (born 1983)

Personal information
- Nickname: Bevo
- Born: 29 January 1983 (age 42) Perth, Western Australia
- Height: 5 ft 2 in (157 cm)

Surfing career
- Sport: Surfing
- Major achievements: 1st place tidal pipeline pro, 2010; 1st place Pipeline Pro Hawaii, 2009; 1st place Team Australia ISA World Games, 2008; 1st place Hello Kitty Pro Huntington, 2004; Australian Pro Junior Tour Champion, 2003

Surfing specifications
- Stance: Regular (natural foot)

Claire Bevilacqua (born 29 January 1983) (nickname "Bevo") is a professional surfer from Perth, Western Australia. She joined the World Championship Tour in 2004. She has won many competitions including the 2009 Pipeline Pro Hawaii.

== Early life ==
Bevilacqua was born and raised "Down Under" to an Australian mother and Italian father. Growing up in West Australia, she got her start riding some of the best and most testing waves in the world. She started skateboarding as soon as she could walk. She picked up surfing at the age of fourteen and quickly picked up the necessary skills and techniques.

== Career ==
Bevilacqua quickly shot up the Junior Australian rankings and received tremendous support from sponsors. In 2003, after only four years of competing, she won the title of State Champion as well as the Australian Pro Junior Women's Champion. The following year, she moved onto the World Championship Tour (WCT) of the Association of Surfing Professionals. In 2005, she ranked tenth in the World Championship Tour and in 2006 she was ranked sixth. Since turning pro she has won several competitions including The Outer Banks Pro in North Carolina, The Hello Kitty Boardfest at Huntington Beach, California and the 2009 Pipepline Pro. Bevilacqua was also voted onto the Nixon Surf Team. After four years of competing as one of the top female surfers in the world, she decided to take a year off from the competition circuit to focus on writing, shooting, and filming for sponsors as well as[surfline.com].

In 2006, Bevilacqua collaborated with [Volcom] to create the "Bevo Signature Series" line of girl shorts.

She returned to competitive surfing in 2009. She quickly shot to third on the World Qualifying Series with her win at Women’s Pipeline Pro Hawaii.

== ESPN Body Issue ==
Bevilacqua appeared in the 2009 ESPN The Magazine's Body Issue.
