= Tiago Pires (surfer) =

Portuguese surfer (born 1980)

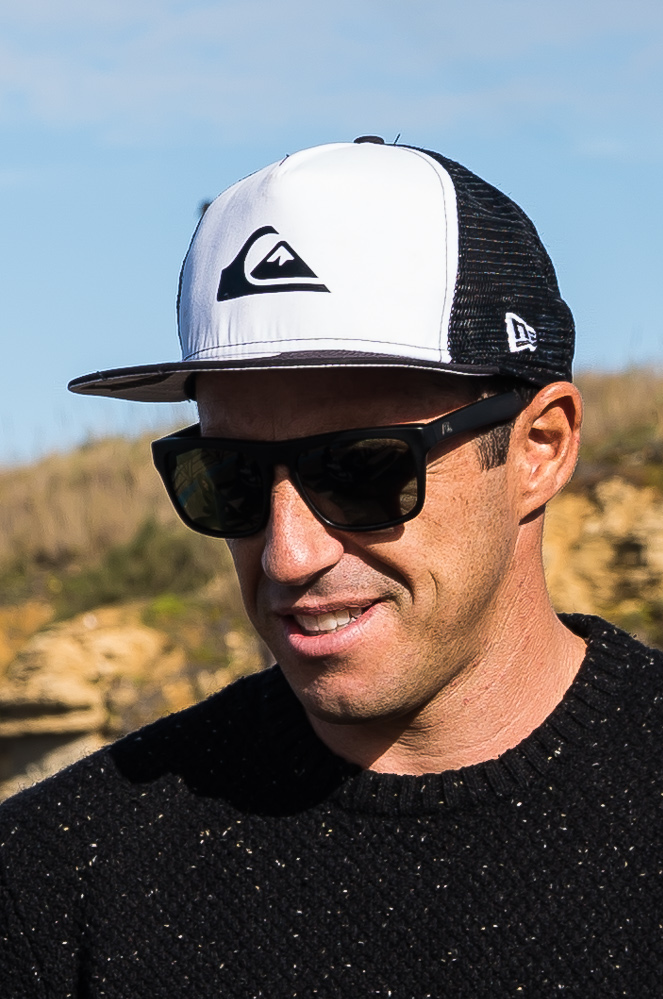
- Pires in 2016

Personal information
- Born: March 13, 1980 (age 45) Lisbon, Portugal
- Years active: 1989–present
- Height: 5 ft 6 in (1.68 m)
- Weight: 153 lb (69 kg)

Surfing career
- Sport: Surfing

Surfing specifications
- Stance: Regular
- Favorite waves: Coxos
- Favorite maneuvers: Barrels

Tiago Pires, also known by his nickname "Saca", is a recently retired professional surfer from Portugal. He was the first male Portuguese surfer to qualify for the WSL Elite Tour.

Pires was born in Lisbon, Portugal in 1980. He started surfing at the age of 9, winning the sub-14 national championship in 1994 and sub-16 in 1995.

In 1996, when he was 16, he joined the national circuit, where he met José Seabra who later became his coach.

In 1997, he beat several European Juniors at Hossegor to challenge the World Junior Title in 1998. There, he competed against Andy Irons, C.J. Hobgood and Taj Burrow, among others.

In 1999, he joined the WQS (World Qualifying Series) for the first time. A year later, he got his first WQS win at Vila Nova de Gaia.

In 2007 he qualified for the WCT, finishing 31st and requalifying through the WQS. Then in 2009 he got a 24th place in the WCT, finishing 21st a year later, his highest position in the ranking.

In 2013, a serious knee injury halted his progression, and his CT run came to an end after the 2014 season. Even though he entered the qualifying tour in 2015, he realized "he didn't have the competitive drive he used to".

In February 2016 he announced his retirement. Months later, "Saca", a documentary film about his career, premiered in Portugal.
