= Aritz Aranburu =

Spanish professional surfer

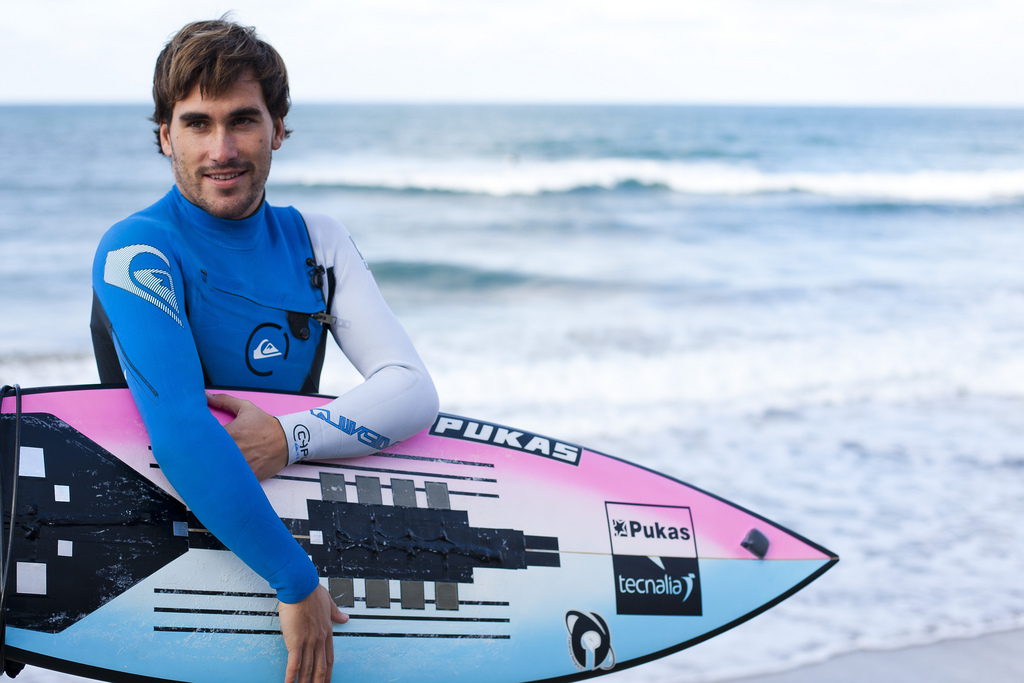
- Born: Aritz Aranburu Aspiazu; 30 August 1985 (age 41); Zarauz, Spain
- Occupation: surfer
- Website: https://www.aritzaranburu.com/

Aritz Aranburu Aspiazu (born August 30, 1985, Zarauz, Guipuscoa) is a Spanish professional surfer. In 2008, he was ranked among the ASP Top 45 after having won the 2007 ASP European Title. In 2007 he was named "Best Basque Sportsman".

== Biography ==
Aranburu began surfing on a shortboard at the age of 7. By the age of 12, he won the Basque Surfing Championship, repeating at the age of 18. He was chosen by the Spanish Surf Federation to take part in the European Surf Championship in 2000 and 2002, winning his first international title at Capbreton in 2000. In 2002, he also competed in the Euro-African Surf Championship, where he finished first in Namibia and second in South Africa.

In 2007, Aranburu won the Zarauz Pro Surf title and became the European champion. He later took part in the World Qualifying Series (WCS), and as he finished the 6th, he qualified for the World Championship Tour (WCT), where he competed with the best 45 surfers of the world. In 2008, Aranburu suffered knee and ankle injuries, but managed to stay alive in the WCT.

== Titles ==
- 2007: Zarautz Pro Surf
- 2007: European champion
