= Brett Simpson =

American surfer

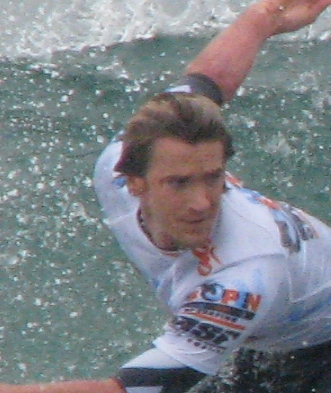

Personal information
- Born: January 5, 1985 (age 41) Long Beach, California, USA
- Height: 6 ft 1 in (1.85 m)
- Weight: 175 lb (79 kg)
- Website: simplysimpo.com

Surfing career
- Sport: Surfing
- Sponsors: Hurley International
- Major achievements: 2x US Open of Surfing champion (2009, 2010); 2009 Orange County Surfer of the Year

Surfing specifications
- Stance: Regular
- Shaper: Tim Stamps
- Favorite waves: Lowers

Brett Simpson is an American surfer and coach from Huntington Beach, California. He is the inaugural head coach of the United States Olympic surfing team. As a surfer, he won the 2009 U.S. Open of Surfing contest, and repeated again in 2010 by successfully defending his title against South African surfer Jordy Smith. Simpson was named the Orange County Surfer of the Year in 2008 and 2009.

He is the son of American football player Bill Simpson. He is a graduate of Huntington Beach High School.
