= Mick Fanning =

Australian surfer (born 1981)

Mick Fanning AO
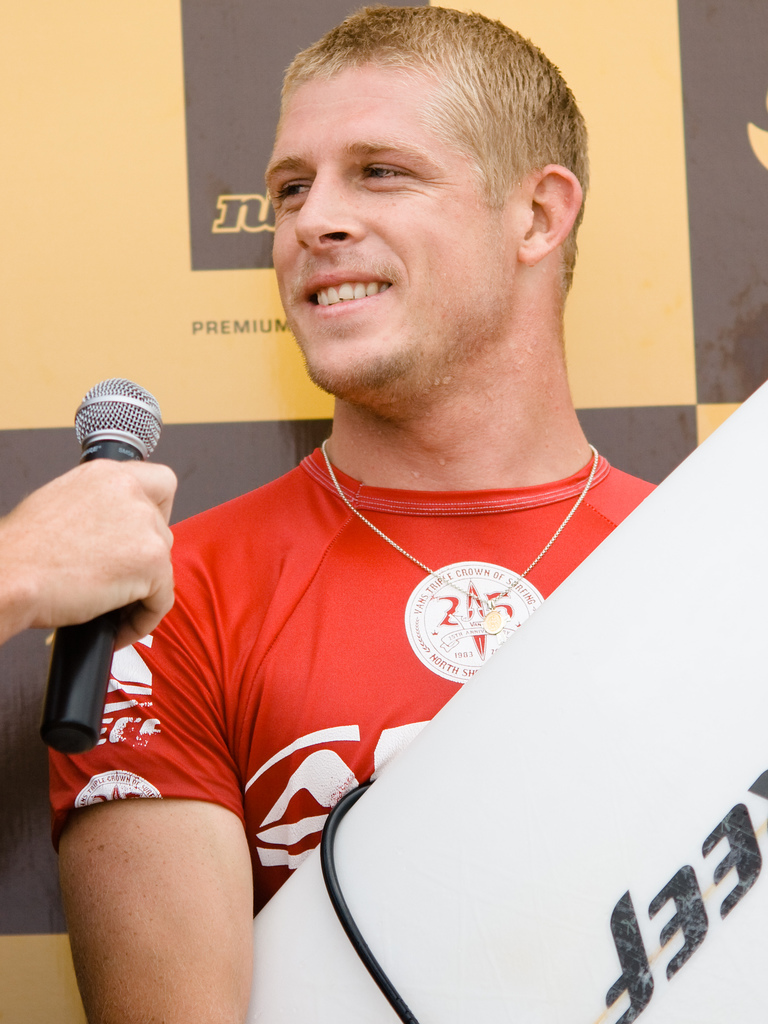
- Born: Michael Eugene Fanning; 13 June 1981 (age 45); Penrith, New South Wales, Australia
- Surfing career
- Nickname: White Lightning
- Years active: 2002–2018
- Height: 5 ft 10 in (178 cm)
- Weight: 165 lb (75 kg)
- Website: www.mickfanning.com
- Sport: Surfing
- Best year: ASP World Champion – 2007, 2009, 2013
- Career earnings: $2,796,120
- Sponsors: Rip Curl, Reef Footwear, Creatures of Leisure Accessories, Dragon Eyewear, Red Bull Zen Nutrition, Skullcandy, Audi, FCS traction and fins
- Major achievements: 3x World Champion (2007, 2009, 2013); ASP/WSL Championship Tour event wins: 22; 2002 WSL Rookie of the Year; 2001 World Qualifying Series Champion; 6x Australian Male Surfer of the Year 2002, 2004, 2007, 2008, 2010, 2011; Surfers' Hall of Fame inductee

Surfing specifications
- Stance: Natural (regular foot)
- Shapers: Darren Handley and Wade Tokoro
- Quiver: 5'11" x 18 5/8" x 2 1/4"
- Favourite waves: Any pointbreak
- Favourite maneuvers: Hacks and tubes

Michael Eugene Fanning AO (born 13 June 1981) is an Australian professional surfer who was crowned champion of the Association of Surfing Professionals/World Surf League (ASP/WSL)'s World Tour in 2007, 2009 and 2013. In 2015, he survived a shark attack by what is suspected to be a great white shark during the J-Bay Open finals in Jeffreys Bay.

== Early years ==
Fanning was born on 13 June 1981 in Penrith, New South Wales, Australia, to Irish parents. He learned to surf from the age of three at Brown Bay near Mount Gambier, but did not focus on surfing until his family moved to Tweed Heads, New South Wales, when he was twelve. He grew up with fellow professional surfer, Joel Parkinson, in the Gold Coast/Northern Rivers region and attended Palm Beach Currumbin State High School together. On the Queensland border, Fanning had access to surf north and south and he began to make a name for himself. In 1996 he established himself as one of the best surfers on the Queensland points by placing in the top three at the Australian National Titles. In 1998, his brother Sean died in a car accident along with fellow surfer Joel Green.

== Professional career ==
Fanning received a wild card entry at the Rip Curl Pro at Bells Beach in 2001, winning one of Australia's leading contests. He finished 2002 as Rookie of the Year, winning the Billabong Pro at Jeffrey's Bay and earning himself a place on the 2002 Association of Surfing Professionals (ASP) World Tour as World Qualifying Series (WQS) Champion.

Fanning suffered a hamstring tear in 2004. It was surgically repaired and he made a comeback to become one of the leading surfers on the ASP world tour.

The year 2007 marked Fanning's sixth year on the ASP World Tour since 2002 and his ninth year on the ASP WQS since 1998. He began his 2007 World Title campaign (WCT) with a victory at the Quiksilver Pro, the first event on the 2007 ASP World Tour, putting himself on top of the ratings. He won the Santa Catarina Pro in Brazil on 6 November 2007 placing above Taj Burrow and Kelly Slater thereby clinching the 2007 ASP world title. In 2008 he suffered a mid-season groin injury. He slipped to eighth position on the end of year ratings. In 2009, Fanning reclaimed the ASP World Champion crown at the Pipeline reef break on Oahu's North Shore. Although Fanning was eliminated by fellow Australian Dean Morrison in Round 4, his points lead from winning three of the last four events was enough to secure victory. In 2013 he had a victory in Round five, and made the quarter-finals at the Billabong Pipeline Masters.

On 3 December 2015, Fanning claimed his first World Qualification Series (WQS) victory in Hawaiian surf by winning the 2015 Vans World Cup at Sunset Beach, Oahu.

== Shark attack ==
On 19 July 2015, Fanning was attacked by a shark two minutes into the J-Bay Open 2015 finals at Jeffreys Bay, South Africa. Fanning was in the water with Julian Wilson during the final when what was suspected to be a great white shark swam next to him and became entangled in his surfboard leash. Fanning punched the shark and tried to wedge his board between the shark and his body. The shark eventually bit off Fanning's leash and Fanning started his attempt to flee back to shore. Wilson paddled towards Fanning to assist him and was praised for his action and hailed as a hero. Much of the early coverage characterized the encounter as a "shark attack." Based on analysis of the video and the fact that Fanning was not bitten, some marine biologists believe the shark had no intention of biting him. However, as there was physical contact between the shark and his board and the shark cut the leash, the International Shark Attack File has classified the encounter as a shark attack.

A response team quickly rescued him from any further danger by scaring the shark away with a boat and picking up both Fanning and Wilson, who was still in the water nearby. Both surfers escaped unharmed and were given a shared victory, splitting the prize-money. Following the ordeal, Wilson gave a tear-filled interview. When he was asked, "You guys are locked in a title battle right now, and to put things into perspective does that mean anything to you at this point in time?", Wilson replied "No, not at all, I'm just happy he's alive." The event was cancelled.

The next day, Fanning returned to Australia. He wondered why the shark did not bite him and told reporters: "I'm just lucky it wasn't my time." The story received international news coverage. Fanning returned to the water to surf again less than a week later, dedicating it to his late brother, and also surfed Ship Stern Bluff on 27 August, a break notorious for great white sharks. Fanning later competed in the Billabong Pro Teahupoo, which took place in August 2015 in Tahiti. Fanning would go on to take a victory at the Hurley Pro at Trestles Beach and finish the year second in the ratings.

== Personal life ==
Fanning was married for eight years to entrepreneur Karissa Dalton. On 31 January 2016, he announced that they were divorcing.

Fanning was co-owner of Balter Brewing Company with Joel Parkinson, Josh Kerr and Bede Durbidge until its sale to Carlton & United Breweries in 2019. In 2019, Fanning invested in Australian dog food company Scratch. Fanning is a supporter of the National Rugby League club Penrith Panthers.

In February 2020, Fanning announced his engagement to girlfriend Breanna Randall. The couple share two children - a son, Xander Dean born August 2020; and daughter Lyla Skye, born April 2024.

== Honours ==
In 2017 Fanning was appointed an Officer of the Order of Australia for distinguished service to surfing as a professional competitor at the national and international level, and as a supporter of a range of charitable foundations. In 2024, he was inducted into the Sport Australia Hall of Fame.

The "masked wood sprite", a spider in the Dolomedidae family, was named Ornodolomedes mickfanningi in his honor.

== Career victories ==
WSL World Tour wins
Year	Event	Venue	Country
2016	J-Bay Open	Jeffreys Bay, Eastern Cap	South Africa
2015	Hurley Pro at Trestles	Trestles, California	United States
2015	Rip Curl Pro Bells Beach	Bells Beach, Victoria	Australia
2014	Moche Rip Curl Pro Portugal	Supertubos, Peniche	Portugal
2014	J-Bay Open	Jeffreys Bay, Eastern Cap	South Africa
2014	Rip Curl Pro Bells Beach	Bells Beach, Victoria	Australia
2013	Quiksilver Pro France	Hossegor, Nouvelle-Aquitaine	France
2012	Billabong Pro Teahupoo	Teahupoo, Tahiti	French Polynesia
2012	Rip Curl Pro Bells Beach	Bells Beach, Victoria	Australia
2010	Quiksilver Pro France	Hossegor, Nouvelle-Aquitaine	France
2009	Hurley Pro at Trestles	Trestles, California	United States
2009	Rip Curl Pro Search	Supertubos, Peniche	Portugal
2009	Quiksilver Pro France	Hossegor, Nouvelle-Aquitaine	France
2007	Quiksilver Pro Gold Coast	Gold Coast, Queensland	Australia
2007	Quiksilver Pro France	Hossegor, Nouvelle-Aquitaine	France
2007	Hang Loose Pro	Imbituba, Santa Catarina	Brazil
2006	Billabong Pro Jeffreys Bay	Jeffreys Bay, Eastern Cap	South Africa
2006	Nova Schin Festival	Imbituba, Santa Catarina	Brazil
2005	Quiksilver Pro Gold Coast	Gold Coast, Queensland	Australia
2005	Rip Curl Pro Search	Saint Leu, Reunion Island	France
2002	Billabong Pro Jeffreys Bay	Jeffreys Bay, Eastern Cap	South Africa
2001	Rip Curl Pro Bells Beach	Bells Beach, Victoria	Australia
WQS Wins
Year	Event	Venue	Country
2015	Vans World Cup	Sunset Beach, Oahu	Hawaii
2005	Energy Australia Open	Newcastle, New South Wales	Australia
2002	Mark Richards Newcastle City Pro	Newcastle, New South Wales	Australia
2001	Wet Dreams Masters	Margaret River, Western Australia	Australia
2000	Mark Richards Newcastle City Pro	Newcastle, New South Wales	Australia

Achievements
Preceded by Joel Parkinson	Association of Surfing Professionals World Champion (men's); 2013	Succeeded by Gabriel Medina
Preceded by Kelly Slater	Association of Surfing Professionals World Champion (men's); 2009	Succeeded by Kelly Slater
Preceded by Kelly Slater	Association of Surfing Professionals World Champion (men's); 2007	Succeeded by Kelly Slater
