= Kelly Slater =

American surfer (born 1972)

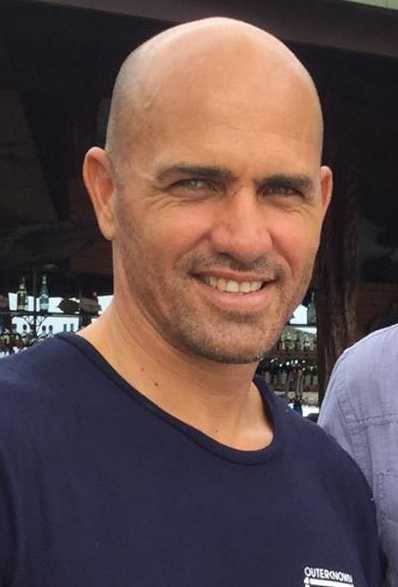
- Slater in 2017

Personal information
- Born: Robert Kelly Slater; February 11, 1972 (age 54) Cocoa Beach, Florida, U.S.
- Years active: 1990–present
- Height: 5 ft 9 in (175 cm)
- Weight: 165 lb (75 kg)
- Website: www.kswaveco.com

Surfing career
- Sport: Surfing
- Major achievements: 11× World Champion (1992, 1994, 1995, 1996, 1997, 1998, 2005, 2006, 2008, 2010, 2011); WSL Championship Tour event wins: 56; 3× Triple Crown of Surfing Champion (1995, 1998, 2019); 8× Pipeline Masters Champion (1992, 1994, 1995, 1996, 1999, 2008, 2013, 2022); 6× Hurley Pro at Trestles Champion (2005, 2007, 2008, 2010, 2011, 2012); 6× Quiksilver Pro Gold Coast Champion (1997, 1998, 2006, 2008, 2011, 2013); 5× Billabong Pro Tahiti Champion (2000, 2003, 2005, 2011, 2016); 4× J-Bay Open Champion (1996, 2003, 2005, 2008); 4× Bells Beach Surf Classic Champion (1994, 2006, 2008, 2010); 4× Fiji Pro Champion (2005, 2008, 2012, 2013); 3× US Open of Surfing Champion (1992, 1996, 2011); 4× Laureus World Sports Award for Action Sportsperson of the Year (2007, 2009, 2011, 2012); Laureus Lifetime Achievement Award (2025); Surfers' Hall of Fame inductee

Surfing specifications
- Favorite waves: Cloudbreak, Pipeline, Teahupo'o, Trespass at Deerfield Beach Pier, Sebastian Inlet, and Lower Trestles
- Favorite maneuvers: Barrels
Medal record
Competition
Representing United States
World Games
Silver medal – second place	2019 Miyazaki	Team
X Games
Gold medal – first place	2003 Los Angeles	Surf
Gold medal – first place	2004 Los Angeles	Surf

Robert Kelly Slater (born February 11, 1972) is an American professional surfer who has been crowned World Surf League champion a record 11 times. He is widely regarded as the greatest professional surfer of all time, and holds 56 Championship Tour victories. Slater won the Laureus World Sports Awards category of Action Sportsperson of the Year four times (2007, 2009, 2011, 2012). and Lifetime Achievement Award (2025). He is also the oldest surfer still active in the World Surf League, winning his 8th Billabong Pipeline Masters title at age 49.

== Early years ==
Slater was born to a Syrian father and a Irish mother, and grew up in Cocoa Beach, Florida, where he still lives. He is the son of Stephen Slater and Judy Moriarity. He has two brothers, Sean and Stephen.

The son of a bait-store proprietor, Slater grew up near the water, and he began surfing at age five. By age ten, he was winning age-division events up and down the Atlantic coast, and in 1984 he won his first age-division United States championship title. Two years later he finished third in the junior division at the world amateur championships in England, and he won the Pacific Cup junior championship in Australia the following year. Slater attended Cocoa Beach High School.

== Professional career ==
Slater turned pro in 1990 and qualified for the Bud Pro Tour (The World Surf League's qualifying tour at the time). He then immediately won his first contest on the Bud Pro Tour, The Body Glove Surf Bout in Trestles, California. At the end of the year he qualified for the World Surf League Championship Tour for the 1991 season. After qualifying for 1991, Slater struggled during his first year on the Championship Tour and was 43rd out of 44 in the world rankings. In 1992 he secured podium (top 3) finishes in three of his first five events before winning his first professional tour event, the Rip Curl Pro, in France. His win in that year's prestigious Pipeline Masters in Hawaii secured his first World Title, and at age 20, he became the youngest world surfing champion ever. Slater finished sixth in the 1993 rankings but came back to win five world titles in a row from 1994 to 1998, during which time televised surfing events had become increasingly popular. He then took a break from competitive surfing at the end of 1998, before returning to the world pro tour in 2002.

=== Sponsors and equipment ===
Slater historically and exclusively rode Channel Islands Surfboards equipped with his own signature series of FCS fins. As the media hype grew around Slater's lack of board stickers in 2015, Slater had been seen riding unlabelled Firewire surfboards, acquiring the company in 2014. In 2016 Slater released his own line of boards. As of August 2017 there are four Slater Designs models in the Firewire range: the Gamma, Cymatic, Omni and Sci-fi.

Since 1990 Slater had been sponsored primarily by surfwear industry giant Quiksilver until his departure on April 1, 2014. In an interview with Steve-O, Slater states that he has made most of his income from being sponsored by this clothing company. After leaving Quiksilver, Slater, in collaboration with Kering, established the eco-friendly and sustainable apparel company called "Outerknown".

== Accomplishments ==
=== Surfing ===
In 2022, Slater won his eighth Pro Pipeline surfing title at the Pipe Masters in Hawaii, 30 years after his first win. In 2023, he announced his intention to qualify for the 2024 Olympics in Paris.

=== Musical appearances and collaborations ===
Slater plays guitar and ukulele, and has performed with Jack Johnson and Angus Stone. In the mid 1990s Slater joined Rob Machado and Peter King in a band called The Surfers.The trio released an album in 1998 titled Songs from the Pipe, a reference to the famous surf spot Pipeline on Oahu, Hawaii. Slater toured Australia with his band, performing in venues such as the Opera House and Parliament House.

Slater performed a song with Ben Harper during Harper's concert in Santa Barbara on August 1, 2006. He also performed Rockin' in the Free World with grunge band Pearl Jam on July 7, 2006, in San Diego.

In 1999, he appeared alongside Garbage singer Shirley Manson in the promotional video for the band's single "You Look So Fine". He played a man washed up on a seashore, then rescued by Manson.

=== Mixed media ===
Slater played the recurring character Jimmy Slade on seven episodes of the popular TV show Baywatch in the early 1990s. He appeared in an episode of the reality show The Girls Next Door, and has starred in many surf films during his career.

A video game named Kelly Slater's Pro Surfer by Treyarch and published by Activision was released in 2002. Slater also appeared as a playable character in Tony Hawk's Pro Skater 3 prior to this, complete with a surfboard.

=== Environmentalism and philanthropy ===
Slater is an advocate of a sustainable and clean living lifestyle. In February 2017, Slater and fellow competitive surfer Jérémy Florès called for a daily cull of bull sharks by French authorities on Réunion following eight shark-related fatalities over the preceding six years. Environmentalists criticized the proposal, with Ken Collins of the University of Southampton describing it as "insane".

On May 8, 2010, the United States House of Representatives honored Slater in H. Res. 792 for his "outstanding and unprecedented achievements in the world of surfing and for being an ambassador of the sport and excellent role model". This resolution, sponsored by Florida representative Bill Posey and sponsored by 10 representatives, passed without objection by a voice vote.

Slater is on the Board of Advisors (the Ocean Advocacy Advisory Board) of ocean conservation organization Sea Shepherd Conservation Society.

== Other ventures ==
=== Outerknown ===
In 2014 Slater ended his 20-year partnership with apparel brand Quiksilver. From there Slater wanted to start a brand founded on the morals instilled in him through surfing, mainly environmentalism and sustainable production practices using recycled materials whenever possible. That brand came to be known as "Outerknown"

=== Purps ===
In 2014, Slater launched the beverage company Purps in collaboration with RVCA founder Pat Tenore and Dr. Chris Schaumburg. Since 2013, Slater has been a brand ambassador for The Chia Company, based in western Australia.

=== Wave Pool ===
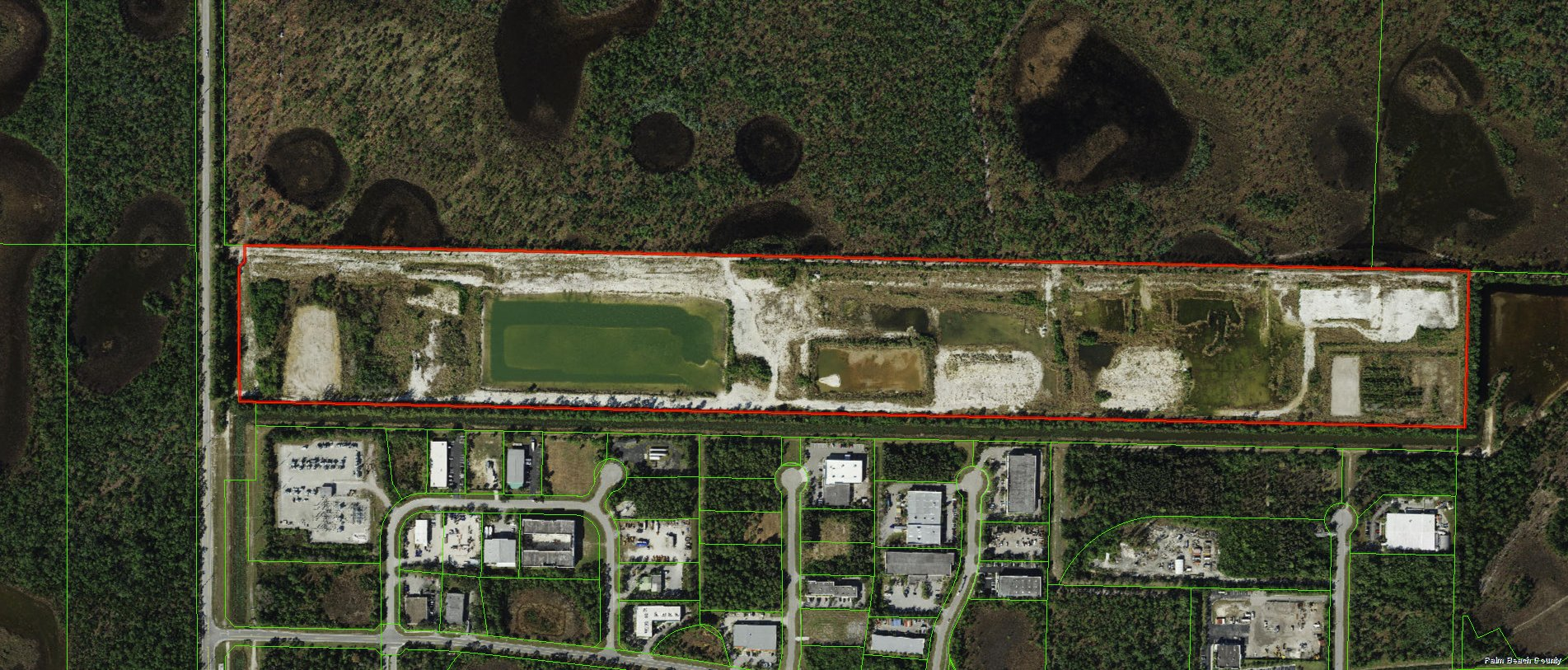
Aerial photograph of 80-acre parcel of land in South Florida proposed to be developed with surf facility (outlined in red).

Wave Pool was a ten-year 'experiment' to create the perfect inland wave pool situated in inland California. Kelly modeled the wave after a combination of Lower Trestles, California, a tubing wave on Oahu, Hawaii, and a secret right in Micronesia in the Marshall Islands. The project was a success and the surfing world was abuzz with the possibilities, mostly due to the wave's perfect shape and speed. In 2016 the World Surf League (WSL) acquired a majority stake in the Kelly Slater Wave Company (KSWC) for an undisclosed sum.

=== Kelly Slater Surf Ranch ===
The WSL held a test event for professional surfers, including Filipe Toledo, Mick Fanning, Kanoa Igarashi, Gabriel Medina and others, at the Kelly Slater Surf Ranch (located at 36.255°N 119.790°W) on Tuesday, September 19, 2017. The Surf Ranch also hosted the WSL Founders Cup on May 5–6, 2018. The contest featured five teams – US, Brazil, Australia, Europe and World – made up of men's and women's surfers from the WSL Championship Tour. The WSL Surf Ranch was constructed outside of Lemoore, California, and has remained private and exclusive.

=== Surf Ranch Florida ===
There were previously plans to develop Surf Ranch Florida, a man-made surfing lake in Palm Beach County. County commissioners unanimously approved plans for the county to evaluate the proposed surf facility in 2017. Brian Waxman, project leader for Surf Ranch Florida, said the World Surf League was considering bringing the wave lake to the Sunshine State for its weather and heritage of world-class surfers. It would have encompassed an 80-acre lot east of Jupiter Farms, near the Pine Glades natural area. Despite acquiring the 80-acre property for $6.5 million dollars in November 2017, WSL announced that plans to develop the surf facility at this location were cancelled in 2019 due to "unforeseen challenges" related to an unexpectedly high groundwater table elevation.

=== La Quinta, California ===
Coral Mountain is a proposed $200-million complex on 400 acres (160 ha) in La Quinta, California that would include a hotel and housing built around a surfing basin created by Kelly Slater Wave Co.

=== Freaks of Nature ===
In 2024, Slater founded and launched Freaks of Nature. A skin care company whose main focus is sunscreen.

=== Legacy Motor Club ===
On July 30, 2026 it was announced that Slater has become a member of the strategic ownership group of Legacy Motor Club, a NASCAR racing team that is co-owned by seven time NASCAR Cup champion, Jimmie Johnson.

== Competitive achievements ==
Slater has been crowned World Surf League Champion a record 11 times, including five consecutive titles in 1994–98. He is the youngest (at age 20) and the oldest (at age 39) to win the WSL men's title. On winning his fifth world title in 1997, Slater passed Australian surfer Mark Richards to become the most successful male champion in the history of the sport. In 2007 he also became the all-time leader in career event wins by winning the Boost Mobile Pro event at Lower Trestles near San Clemente, California. The previous record was held by Slater's childhood hero, three-time world champion Tom Curren. After earlier being awarded the title prematurely as a result of a miscalculation by the Association of Surfing Professionals (ASP), on November 6, 2011, Slater officially won his eleventh ASP world title at the Rip Curl Pro Search San Francisco, by winning his fourth round heat.

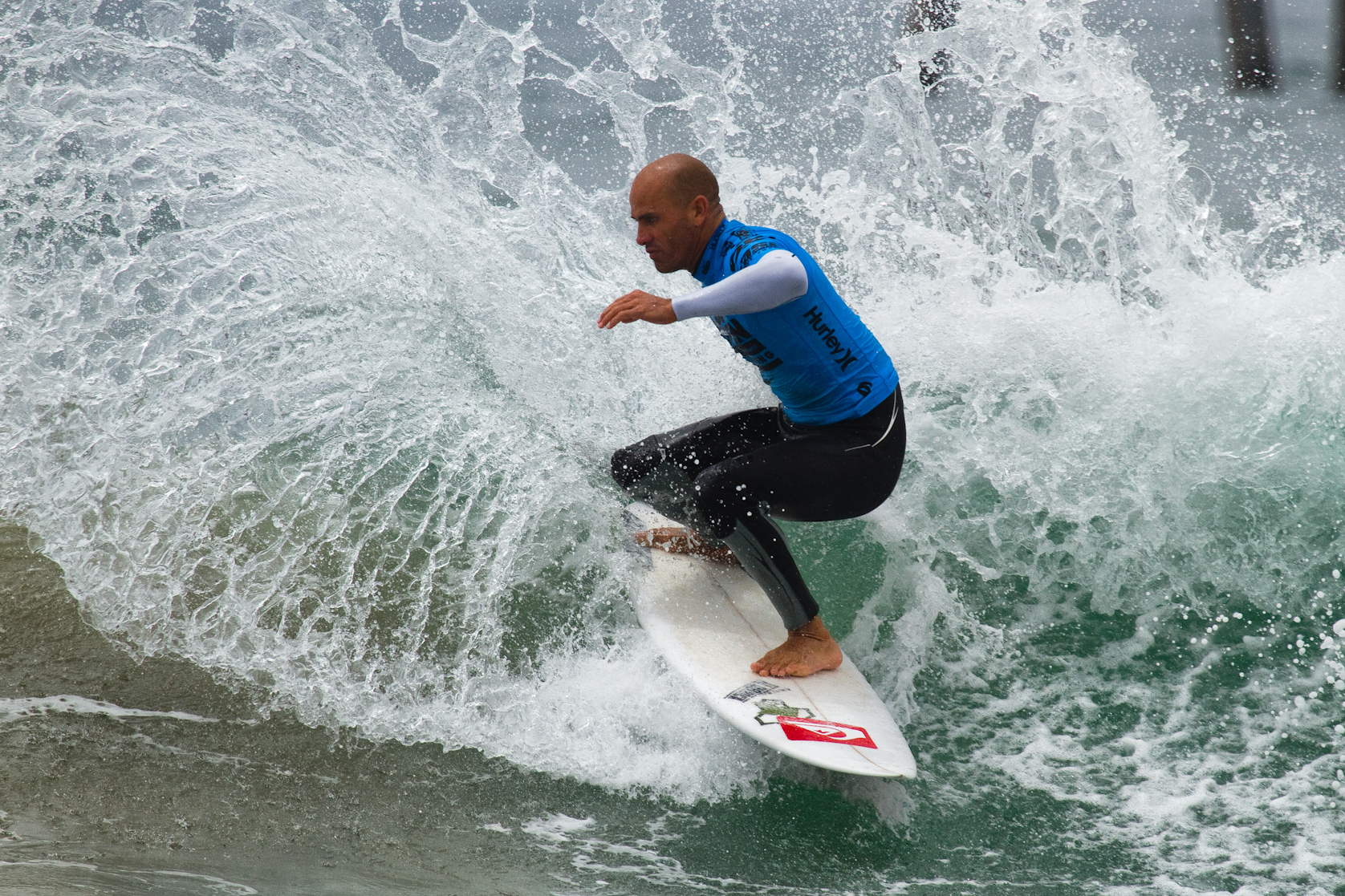
Slater competing at the US Open at Huntington Beach, 2011

In May 2005, in the final heat of the Billabong Tahiti Pro contest at Teahupo'o, Slater became the first surfer ever to be awarded two perfect scores for a total 20 out of 20 points under the ASP two-wave scoring system (fellow American Shane Beschen made the first perfect score under the previous three-wave system in 1996).

Slater did it again in June 2013 at the quarter finals at the Volcom Fiji Pro with two perfect ten waves, only the fourth person in history to do so.

Slater is also the oldest surfer to perform a ten-point ride in World Surf League competition at the age of 47 at the 2019 Billabong Pipe Masters.

=== 2013 stats and results ===
World ranking: 2nd
Points: 54,150

Event results in 2013 Quiksilver Pro (Gold Coast, Australia): 1st
Rip Curl Pro (Bells Beach, Victoria, Australia): 13th
Volcom Fiji Pro (Tavarua/Namotu, Fiji): 1st
Oakley Pro Bali (Keramas, Bali, Indonesia): 9th
Billabong Pro Teahupoo (Teahupoo, Taiarapu, French Polynesia): 2nd

Billabong Pipeline Masters (Pipeline, Oahu, Hawaii): 1st

He also won many other surfing titles.

=== 2012 stats and results ===
World ranking: 2nd
Points: 55,450

Event results in 2012
Quiksilver Pro presented by Land Rover (Gold Coast, Snapper Rocks, Australia): 5th
Rip Curl Pro presented by Ford Ranger (Bells Beach, Victoria, Australia): 2nd
Billabong Rio Pro (Rio de Janeiro, Brazil): INJ
Volcom Fiji Pro (Tavarua/Namotu, Fiji): 1st
Billabong Pro Tahiti (Teahupoo, Tahiti): 13th
Hurley Pro (Lower Trestles, San Clemente, California, US): 1st
Quiksilver Pro France (Hossegor-Landes, France): 1st
Rip Curl Pro (Peniche, Portugal): 13th
O'Neill Coldwater Classic Santa Cruz (Santa Cruz, California, US): 9th
Billabong Pipeline Masters (Pipeline, Oahu, Hawaii): 3rd

=== 2011 stats and results ===
World ranking: 2011 Champion
Points: 68,100

Event results in 2011
Quiksilver Pro Gold Coast (Snapper Rocks, Australia): 1st
Rip Curl Pro, Bells Beach, (Victoria, Australia): 5th
Billabong Rio Pro (Rio de Janeiro, Brazil): 13th
Nike Pro US Open (Huntington Beach, California, US): 1st
Billabong Pro Teahupoo (Teahupoo, Tahiti): 1st
Quiksilver Pro New York (Long Beach, New York, US): 2nd
Hurley Pro (Lower Trestles, San Clemente, California, US): 1st
Quiksilver Pro France (Hossegor, France): 5th
Rip Curl Pro Portugal (Peniche, Portugal): 2nd
Rip Curl Search (Ocean Beach, San Francisco, US): 5th
Billabong Pipeline Masters (Pipeline, Oahu, Hawaii): 3rd

=== 2010 stats and results ===
World ranking: 2010 Champion
Points: 69000

Event results in 2010
Quiksilver Pro, Gold Coast (Snapper Rocks, Australia): 9th
Rip Curl Pro, Bells Beach (Australia): 1st
Hang Loose Pro (Santa Catarina, Brasil): 2nd
Billabong Pro (Jeffreys Bay, South Africa): 17th
Billabong Pro Teahupoo (Teahupoo, Tahiti): 3rd
Hurley Pro (Lower Trestles, San Clemente, California, US): 1st
Quiksilver Pro France (Hossegor, France): 2nd
Rip Curl Pro Portugal (Peniche, Portugal): 1st
Rip Curl Pro Search 2010 (Middles Beach, Isabela, Puerto Rico): 1st
Billabong Pipeline Masters (Pipeline, Oahu, Hawaii): 3rd

=== 2009 stats and results ===
World ranking: 6th.
Points: 6136

Event results in 2009
Quiksilver Pro, Gold Coast (Snapper Rocks, Australia): 17th
Rip Curl Pro, Bells Beach (Australia): 17th
Billabong Pro, Tahiti (Teahupoo, Tahiti): 17th
Hang Loose Pro (Santa Catarina, Brasil): 1st
Billabong Pro (Jeffreys Bay, South Africa): 9th
Hurley Pro (Lower Trestles, San Clemente, California, US): 3rd
Quiksilver Pro France (Hossegor, France): 5th
Billabong Pro, Mundaka (Mundaka, Spain): 3rd
Rip Curl Search (Peniche, Portugal): 17th
Billabong Pipeline Masters (Pipeline, Oahu, Hawaii): 2nd

=== 2008 stats and results ===
World ranking: 2008 Champion
Points: 8832

Event results
Quiksilver Pro, Gold Coast (Snapper Rocks, Australia): 1st
Rip Curl Pro, Bells Beach (Australia): 1st
Billabong Pro, Tahiti (Teahupoo, Tahiti): 17th
Globe Pro, Fiji (Tavarua, Fiji): 1st
Billabong Pro, J-Bay (Jeffreys Bay, South Africa): 1st
Rip Curl Search (Bali, Indonesia): 17th
Boost Mobile Pro (Lower Trestles, San Clemente, California, US): 1st
Quiksilver Pro France (Hossegor, France): 2nd
Billabong Pro, Mundaka (Mundaka, Spain): 9th
Hang Loose Pro (Santa Catarina, Brasil): DNS
Billabong Pipeline Masters (Pipeline, Oahu, Hawaii): 1st

=== History of wins ===
2022

- Billabong Pro Pipeline (Oahu, Hawaii)

2019

- Triple Crown of Surfing (Specialty-Hawaii)

2016

- Billabong Pro (Teahupoo, Tahiti) – WT

2014

- Volcom Pipe Pro (Pipeline, Hawaii) – QS 5-Stars

2013

- Quiksilver Pro (Gold Coast, Australia) – WT
- Volcom Fiji Pro (Tavarua/Namotu, Fiji) – WT
- Billabong Pipeline Masters (Pipeline, Hawaii) – WT

2012

- Volcom Fiji Pro (Tavarua, Fiji) – WT
- Hurley Pro (Trestles, California, US) – WT
- Quiksilver Pro France (South West Coast, France) – WT

2011

- Quiksilver Pro (Gold Coast, Australia) – WT
- Billabong Pro (Teahupoo, Tahiti) – WT
- Hurley Pro (Trestles, California, US) – WT
- Nike US Open of Surfing (Huntington Beach, California, US) – QS Prime

2010

- Rip Curl Pro (Bells Beach, Australia) – WT
- Hurley Pro (Trestles, California, US) – WT
- Rip Curl Pro (Peniche, Portugal) – WT
- Rip Curl Search (Middles, Isabela, Puerto Rico) – WT

2009

- Hang Loose Santa Catarina Pro (Santa Catarina, Brasil) – WT

2008

- Quiksilver Pro (Gold Coast, Australia) – WT
- Rip Curl Pro (Bells Beach, Australia) – WT
- Globe Pro (Tavarua, Fiji) – WT
- Billabong Pro (Jeffreys Bay, South Africa) – WT
- Boost Mobile Pro (Trestles, California, US) – WT
- Billabong Pipeline Masters (Pipeline, Hawaii) – WT

2007

- Boost Mobile Pro (Trestles, California, US) – WT

2006

- Quiksilver Pro (Gold Coast, Australia) – WT
- Rip Curl Pro (Bells Beach, Australia) – WT

2005

- Billabong Pro (Teahupoo, Tahiti) – WT
- Globe Pro Fiji (Tavarua, Fiji) – WT
- Billabong Pro (Jeffreys Bay, South Africa) – WT
- Boost Mobile Pro (Trestles, California, US) – WT

2004

- X Games SRF The Game
- Snickers Australian Open – QS
- Energy Australia Open – QS

2003

- X Games SRF The Game
- Billabong Pro (Teahupoo, Tahiti) – WT
- Billabong Pro (Jeffreys Bay, South Africa) – WT
- Billabong Pro (Mundaka, Spain) – WT
- Nova Schin Festival (Santa Catarina, Brazil) – WT

2002

- Quiksilver in Memory of Eddie Aikau (Specialty-Hawaii)

2000

- Gotcha Pro Tahiti (Teahupoo, Tahiti) – WT

1999

- Mountain Dew Pipeline Masters (Pipeline, Hawaii) – WT

1998

- Billabong Pro (Gold Coast, Australia) – WT
- Triple Crown of Surfing (Specialty-Hawaii)

1997

- Coke Surf Classic (Manly Beach, Australia) – QS 6-Stars
- Billabong Pro (Gold Coast, Australia) – WT
- Tokushima Pro (Tokushima, Japan) – WT
- Marui Pro (Chiba, Japan) – WT
- Kaiser Summer Surf (Rio de Janeiro, Brazil) – WT
- Grand Slam (Specialty-Australia)
- Typhoon Lagoon Surf Challenge (Specialty-US)

1996

- Coke Surf Classic (Narrabeen, Australia)
- Rip Curl Pro Saint Leu (Saint Leu, Reunion Island)
- CSI presents Billabong Pro (Jeffreys Bay, South Africa)
- U.S. Open of Surfing (Huntington Beach, California, US)
- Rip Curl Pro Hossegor (Hossegor, France)
- Quiksilver Surfmasters (Biarritz, France)
- Chiemsee Gerry Lopez Pipe Masters (Pipeline, Hawaii)
- Sud Ouest Trophee (Specialty-France)
- Da Hui Backdoor Shootout (Specialty-Hawaii)

1995

- Quiksilver Pro (Grajagan, Indonesia)
- Chiemsee Pipe Masters (Pipeline, Hawaii)
- Triple Crown of Surfing (Specialty-Hawaii)

1994

- Rip Curl Pro (Bells Beach, Australia)
- Gotcha Lacanau Pro (Lacanau, France)
- Chiemsee Gerry Lopez Pipe Masters (Pipeline, Hawaii)
- Bud Surf Tour Seaside Reef (WQS-US)
- Bud Surf Tour Huntington (WQS-US)
- Sud Ouest Trophee (Specialty-France)

1993

- Marui Pro (Chiba, Japan)

1992

- Rip Curl Pro Landes (Hossegor, France)
- Marui Pipe Masters (Pipeline, Hawaii)

1990

- Body Glove Surfbout (Trestles, California, US)

== Career victories ==
WCT Wins
Year	Event	Venue	Country	Event Wins
2022	Billabong Pro Pipeline	Banzai Pipeline, Oahu	Hawaii	56°
2016	Billabong Pro Tahiti	Teahupo'o, Tahiti	French Polynesia	55°
2013	Billabong Pipe Masters	Banzai Pipeline, Oahu	Hawaii	54°
2013	Volcom Fiji Pro	Restaurants, Tavarua	Fiji	53°
2013	Quiksilver Pro Gold Coast	Gold Coast, Queensland	Australia	52°
2012	Quiksilver Pro France	Hossegor, Nouvelle-Aquitaine	France	51°
2012	Hurley Pro at Trestles	Trestles, California	United States	50°
2012	Volcom Fiji Pro	Cloudbreak, Tavarua	Fiji	49°
2011	Hurley Pro at Trestles	Trestles, California	United States	48°
2011	Billabong Pro Teahupoo	Teahupo'o, Tahiti	French Polynesia	47°
2011	Quiksilver Pro Gold Coast	Gold Coast, Queensland	Australia	46°
2010	Rip Curl Search	Middles Beach, Isabela	Puerto Rico	45°
2010	Rip Curl Pro Portugal	Supertubos, Peniche	Portugal	44°
2010	Hurley Pro at Trestles	Trestles, California	United States	43°
2010	Rip Curl Pro Bells Beach	Bells Beach, Victoria	Australia	42°
2009	Hang Loose Santa Catarina Pro	Imbituba, Santa Catarina	Brazil	41°
2008	Billabong Pipeline Masters	Banzai Pipeline, Oahu	Hawaii	40°
2008	Boost Mobile Pro	Trestles, California	United States	39°
2008	Billabong Pro J-Bay	Jeffreys Bay, Eastern Cap	South Africa	38°
2008	Globe Fiji Pro	Namotu, Tavarua	Fiji	37°
2008	Rip Curl Pro Bells Beach	Bells Beach, Victoria	Australia	36°
2008	Quiksilver Pro Gold Coast	Gold Coast, Queensland	Australia	35°
2007	Boost Mobile Pro	Trestles, California	United States	34°
2006	Rip Curl Pro Bells Beach	Bells Beach, Victoria	Australia	33°
2006	Quiksilver Pro Gold Coast	Gold Coast, Queensland	Australia	32°
2005	Boost Mobile Pro	Trestles, California	United States	31°
2005	Billabong Pro J-Bay	Jeffreys Bay, Eastern Cap	South Africa	30°
2005	Globe WCT Fiji	Namotu, Tavarua	Fiji	29°
2005	Billabong Pro Teahupoo	Teahupo'o, Tahiti	French Polynesia	28°
2003	Nova Schin Festival	Florianópolis, Santa Catarina	Brazil	27°
2003	Billabong Pro Mundaka	Mundaka, Euskadi	Spain	26°
2003	Billabong Pro J-Bay	Jeffreys Bay, Eastern Cap	South Africa	25°
2003	Billabong Pro Teahupoo	Teahupo'o, Tahiti	French Polynesia	24°
2000	Gotcha Pro Tahiti	Teahupo'o, Tahiti	French Polynesia	23°
1999	Mountain Dew Pipe Masters	Banzai Pipeline, Oahu	Hawaii	22°
1998	Billabong Pro	Gold Coast, Queensland	Australia	21°
1997	Kaiser Summer Surf	Barra da Tijuca, Rio de Janeiro	Brazil	20°
1997	Marui Pro	Torami Beach, Chiba	Japan	19°
1997	Tokushima Pro	Tokushima	Japan	18°
1997	Billabong Pro	Gold Coast, Queensland	Australia	17°
1997	Coke Surf Classic	Narrabeen, New South Wales	Australia	16°
1996	Chiemsee Pipe Masters	Banzai Pipeline, Oahu	Hawaii	15°
1996	Quiksilver Surf masters	Lacanau Océan, Nouvelle-Aquitaine	France	14°
1996	Rip Curl Pro	Hossegor, Landes	France	13°
1996	US Open	Huntington Beach, California	United States	12°
1996	Billabong Pro	Jeffreys Bay, Eastern Cap	South Africa	11°
1996	Rip Curl Pro Saint Leu	St. Leu, Réunion Island	France	10°
1996	Coke Surf Classic	Narrabeen, New South Wales	Australia	9°
1995	Chiemsee Pipe Masters	Banzai Pipeline, Oahu	Hawaii	8°
1995	Quiksilver Pro	G-Land, Banyuwangi	Indonesia	7°
1994	Chiemsee Pipe Masters	Banzai Pipeline, Oahu	Hawaii	6°
1994	Gotcha Lacanau Pro	Lacanau, Gironde	France	5°
1994	Rip Curl Pro	Bells Beach, Victoria	Australia	4°
1993	Marui Pro	Hebara Beach, Chiba	Japan	3°
1992	Marui Pipemasters	Banzai Pipeline, Oahu	Hawaii	2°
1992	Rip Curl Pro Landes	Hossegor, Nouvelle-Aquitaine	France	1°
WQS Wins
Year	Event	Venue	Country	Event Wins
2011	US Open of Surfing	Huntington Beach, California	United States	6
2004	Energy Australian Open	Newcastle, New South Wales	Australia	5
2004	Snickers Australian Open	Sydney	Australia	4
1994	Bud Surf Tour	Huntington Beach, California	United States	3
1994	Bud Surf Tour	Seaside Reef, California	United States	2
1990	Body Glove Surf Bout	Trestles, California	United States	1

=== Wins by country ===
Nation	Stops Won	Years
Australia	12	1994, 1996, 1997, 1997, 1998, 2006, 2006, 2008, 2008, 2010, 2011, 2013
United States	11	1990, 1994, 1994, 1996, 2005, 2007, 2008, 2010, 2011, 2011, 2012
Hawaii	8	1992, 1994, 1995, 1996, 1999, 2008, 2013, 2022
France	6	1992, 1994, 1996, 1996, 1996, 2012
French Polynesia	5	2000, 2003, 2005, 2011, 2016
Fiji	4	2005, 2008, 2012, 2013
South Africa	4	1996, 2003, 2005, 2008
Brazil	3	1997, 2003, 2009
Japan	3	1993, 1997, 1997
Puerto Rico	1	2010
Portugal	1	2010
Spain	1	2003
Réunion	1	1996
Indonesia	1	1995

== Personal life ==
Slater is an avid golfer and practices the sport of Brazilian jiu-jitsu. His biggest surfing inspiration is 3× WSL champion Tom Curren. Curren was the first American surfer to win a World Title. Kelly got his chance to compete against him when Kelly became a full time tour competitor in 1991. Big wave surfers Todd Chesser and Brock Little were also mentors to him when he was a teenager.

Kelly dated Pamela Anderson for several years in the early 1990s, sometimes not exclusively, meeting her on the set of Baywatch. Kelly was also in a relationship with Gisele Bündchen from 2005 to 2006, and Cameron Diaz in 2007.

Slater has a daughter, Taylor (b. 1996), from a previous relationship with Tamara Mitchell.

Kelly met his long-term partner Kalani Miller, who worked for Roxy at the time, at the ASR trade show in San Diego in 2006 and the pair began a relationship in 2008. The couple welcomed a son named Tao Druku in 2024. In February 2026 the couple announced that they were expecting their second child, a baby girl named Azumi Moon, in Spring 2026.

== Filmography ==
=== Films ===
- Surfers – The Movie (1990)
- Kelly Slater in Black and White (1991)
- Momentum 1 (1992)
- Focus (1994)
- Endless Summer II (1994)
- Factory Seconds (1995)
- Momentum 2 (1996)
- Good Times (1996)
- Kelly Slater in Kolor (1997)
- The Show (1997)
- Loose Change (1999)
- Hit & Run (2000)
- Thicker than Water (2000)
- One Night at McCool's (2001)
- September Sessions (2002)
- Step into Liquid (2003)
- Campaign 1 (2003)
- Riding Giants (2004)
- Doped Youth 'Groovy Avalon' (2004)
- Young Guns 1, 2 & 3 (2004–2008)
- Campaign 2 (2005)
- Burn (2005)
- Letting Go (2006)
- Surf's Up (2007)
- Down the Barrel (2007)
- Bra Boys: Blood is Thicker than Water (2007)
- Bustin' Down the Door (2008)
- One Track Mind (2008)
- Kelly Slater Letting Go (2008)
- Waveriders (2008)
- The Ocean (2008)
- A Fly in the Champagne (2009) (featuring Kelly Slater and Andy Irons)
- Cloud 9 (2009)
- Keep Surfing (2009)
- Ultimate Wave Tahiti (2010)
- Fighting Fear (2011)
- Wave Warriors 3
- View from a Blue Moon (2015)
- Andy Irons: Kissed by God (2018)
- Momentum Generation (2018)

=== Cameo appearances ===
- "You Look So Fine" – Garbage music video (1999)
- '"Surf's Up" (2007)
- View From A Blue Moon (2015)

=== Television ===
- Baywatch, 23 episodes (1992–1993)
- The Jersey, surfing episode 18 (2001)
- Lilo & Stitch: The Series, 2 episodes (2003) as Surfer (voice)
- The Girls Next Door, "Surf's Up" (one episode)
- The Ultimate Surfer, "Kelly-vision" cameos
- Kelly Slater: Lost Tapes, 11 episodes (2022)
- Make or Break, 2 seasons (2022–2023)

=== Video games ===
- Tony Hawk's Pro Skater 3 (2001)
- Kelly Slater's Pro Surfer (2002)

== See also ==
- Wave pool
- Wavegarden

== Books ==
- Pipe Dreams: A Surfer's Journey (2003), ISBN 0-06-009629-2
- Kelly Slater: For the Love (2008), ISBN 0-8118-6222-4

Achievements
Preceded by Damien Hardman	Association of Surfing Professionals World Champion (men's); 1992	Succeeded by Derek Ho
Preceded by Derek Ho	Association of Surfing Professionals World Champion (men's); 1994–1998	Succeeded by Mark Occhilupo
Preceded by Andy Irons	Association of Surfing Professionals World Champion (men's); 2005–2006	Succeeded by Mick Fanning
Preceded by Mick Fanning	Association of Surfing Professionals World Champion (men's); 2008	Succeeded by Mick Fanning
Preceded by Mick Fanning	World Surf league (men's); 2010–2011	Succeeded by Joel Parkinson
