= 2018 in aquatic sports =

This article lists the in the water and on the water forms of aquatic sports for 2018.

== Aquatics (FINA) ==
=== International aquatic events ===
- June 4 – 10: 2018 FINA Diving World Cup in Wuhan
  - 3m Springboard winners: (China) Xie Siyi (m) / (China) Shi Tingmao (f)
  - 10m Platform winners: (China) Chen Aisen (m) / (China) Zhang Jiaqi (f)
  - Synchronized 3m winners: China (Cao Yuan & Xie Siyi) (m) / China (Shi Tingmao & CHANG Yani) (f)
  - Synchronized 10m winners: China (Yang Hao & Chen Aisen) (m) / China (Zhang Jiaqi & Zhang Minjie) (f)
  - Mixed Synchronized winners: China (Wang Han & LI Zheng) (3m) / China (Lian Junjie & Si Yajie) (10m)
  - Mixed 3m & 10m Team winners: China (Qiu Bo & CHEN Yiwen)
- July 18 – 22: 2018 FINA World Junior Synchronised Swimming Championships in (Hungary) Budapest
  - Russia won all the gold medals available and won the overall medal tally, too.
- July 23 – 29: 2018 FINA World Junior Diving Championships in (Ukraine) Kyiv
  - 1m Springboard winners: (China) WANG Zongyuan (m) / (China) MA Tong (f)
  - 3m Springboard winners: (Colombia) Daniel Restrepo Garcia (m) / (China) LIN Shan (f)
  - 10m Platform winners: (China) LIAN Junjie (m) / (China) ZHANG Rui (f)
  - Synchronized 3m winners: Canada (Henry McKay & Victor Povzner) (m) / China (MA Tong & ZHANG Rui) (f)
  - Synchronized 10m winners: China (LI Zheng & LIAN Junjie) (m) / China (LAI Shiyun & LIU Jialing) (f)
  - Mixed Team winners: Great Britain
- August 9 – 14: 2018 Pan Pacific Swimming Championships in (Japan) Tokyo
  - United States won both the gold and overall medal tallies.
- September 6 – 8: 2018 FINA World Junior Open Water Swimming Championships in (Israel) Eilat
  - 5 km winners: (Russia) Aleksandr Stepanov (m) / (Italy) Iris Menchini (f)
  - 7.5 km winners: (France) Jean-Baptiste Clusman (m) / (United States) Chase Travis (f)
  - 10 km winners: (United States) Michael Brinegar (m) / (Spain) Paula Ruiz Bravo (f)
  - Relay (Age 14–16) winners: Hungary (Viktoria Mihalyvari, Mira Szimcsak, Zoltan Tabi, & Szilard Galyassy)
  - Open Relay winners: France (Madelon Catteau, Jean-Baptiste Clusman, Lisa Pou, & Enzo Roldan Munoz)
- November 9 & 10: 2018 FINA High Diving World Cup in (United Arab Emirates) Abu Dhabi
  - Winners: (United Kingdom) Gary Hunt (m) / (Australia) Rhiannan Iffland (f)
- December 11 – 16: 2018 FINA World Swimming Championships (25 m) in (China) Hangzhou
  - United States won both the gold and overall medal tallies.

=== 2018 FINA Marathon Swim World Series ===
- March 17: MSWS #1 in (Qatar) Doha
  - Winners: (Netherlands) Ferry Weertman (m) / (Netherlands) Sharon van Rouwendaal (f)
- May 20: MSWS #2 in the Seychelles
  - Winners: (Italy) Simone Ruffini (m) / (Italy) Arianna Bridi (f)
- June 9: MSWS #3 in (Portugal) Setúbal
  - Winners: (Hungary) Kristóf Rasovszky (m) / (United States) Haley Anderson (f)
- June 16: MSWS #4 in (Hungary) Balatonfüred
  - Winners: (Germany) Florian Wellbrock (m) / (Brazil) Ana Marcela Cunha (f)
- July 26: MSWS #5 in (Canada) Lac Saint-Jean
  - Winners: (Netherlands) Marcel Schouten (m) / (Brazil) Ana Marcela Cunha (f)
- August 11: MSWS #6 in (Canada) Lake Mégantic
  - Winners: (Germany) Christian Reichert (m) / (China) Xin Xin (f)
- September 16: MSWS #7 in (China) Chun'an County (Hangzhou)
  - Winners: (United Kingdom) Jack Burnell (m) / (China) Xin Xin (f)
- November 24: MSWS #8 (final) in (United Arab Emirates) Abu Dhabi
  - Winners: (Germany) Florian Wellbrock (m) / (Italy) Arianna Bridi (f)

=== 2018 FINA Ultra Marathon Swim Series ===
- February 4: UMSS #1 in (Argentina) Coronda
  - Winners: (Argentina) Guillermo Bertola (m) / (Argentina) Cecilia Biagioli (f)
- July 28: UMSS #2 in (Canada) Lac Saint-Jean
  - Winners: (Italy) Edoardo Stochino (m) / (Italy) Barbara Pozzobon (f)
- August 25: UMSS #3 (final) in (North Macedonia) Ohrid
  - Winners: (Italy) Francesco Ghettini (m) / (Italy) Barbara Pozzobon (f)

=== 2018 FINA Diving World Series ===
- March 9 – 11: DWS #1 in Beijing
  - 3m Springboard winners: (China) Xie Siyi (m) / (China) Shi Tingmao (f)
  - 10m Platform winners: (China) Yang Jian (m) / (China) ZHANG Jiaqi (f)
  - Synchronized 3m winners: China (Xie Siyi & Cao Yuan) (m) / China (CHEN Yiwen & Wang Han) (f)
  - Synchronized 10m winners: China (Chen Aisen & Yang Hao) (m) / China (Zhang Minjie & Zhang Jiaqi) (f)
  - Mixed Synchronized winners: China (LI Zheng & Wang Han) (3m) / China (LIN Shan & LIAN Junjie) (10m)
- March 15 – 17: DWS #2 in (Japan) Fuji, Shizuoka
  - 3m Springboard winners: (China) Cao Yuan (m) / (China) Shi Tingmao (f)
  - 10m Platform winners: (China) LIAN Junjie (m) / (China) Zhang Jiaqi (f)
  - Synchronized 3m winners: China (Cao Yuan & Xie Siyi) (m) / China (Chang Yani & Shi Tingmao) (f)
  - Synchronized 10m winners: China (Yang Hao & Chen Aisen) (m) / China (Zhang Minjie & Zhang Jiaqi) (f)
  - Mixed Synchronized winners: China (LI Zheng & Wang Han) (3m) / China (Lin Shan & Lian Junjie) (10m)
- April 27 – 29: DWS #3 in Montreal
  - 3m Springboard winners: (China) Cao Yuan (m) / (China) Shi Tingmao (f)
  - 10m Platform winners: (China) Qiu Bo (m) / (China) Ren Qian (f)
  - Synchronized 3m winners: China (Xie Siyi & Cao Yuan) (m) / China (CHANG Yani & Shi Tingmao) (f)
  - Synchronized 10m winners: China (Yang Jian & Qiu Bo) (m) / Malaysia (Pandelela Rinong & Cheong Jun Hoong) (f)
  - Mixed Synchronized winners: Canada (François Imbeau-Dulac & Jennifer Abel) (3m) / Canada (Meaghan Benfeito & Nathan Zsombor-Murray) (10m)
- May 4 – 6: DWS #4 (final) in Kazan
  - 3m Springboard winners: (China) Xie Siyi (m) / (China) Shi Tingmao (f)
  - 10m Platform winners: (China) Yang Jian (m) / (China) Ren Qian (f)
  - Synchronized 3m winners: China (Cao Yuan & Xie Siyi) (m) / China (CHANG Yani & Shi Tingmao) (f)
  - Synchronized 10m winners: Russia (Aleksandr Bondar & Viktor Minibaev) (m) / China (LIN Shan & Si Yajie) (f)
  - Mixed Synchronized winners: Canada (Jennifer Abel & François Imbeau-Dulac) (3m) / Russia (Yulia Timoshinina & Nikita Shleikher) (10m)

=== 2018 FINA Diving Grand Prix ===
- February 23 – 25: DGP #1 in Rostock
  - 3m Springboard winners: (Germany) Patrick Hausding (m) / (China) Huang Xiaohui (f)
  - 10m Platform winners: (China) Qiu Bo (m) / (China) Si Yajie (f)
  - Synchronized 3m winners: China (WANG Zong Yuam & HU Zijie) (m) / Germany (Lena Hentschel & Tina Punzel) (f)
  - Synchronized 10m winners: China (Tai Xiaohu & CAO Lizhi) (m) / China (XU Yijin & Si Yajie) (f)
  - Mixed Synchronized winners: China (CHEN Yiwen & Tai Xiaohu) (3m) / China (Si Yajie & CAO Lizhi) (10m)
- May 10 – 13: DGP #2 in Calgary
  - 3m Springboard winners: (China) PENG Jianfeng (m) / (China) CHEN Yiwen (f)
  - 10m Platform winners: (China) YU Duan (m) / (China) LU Wei (f)
  - Synchronized 3m winners: Canada (Philippe Gagné & François Imbeau-Dulac) (m) / China (WU Chunting & CHEN Yiwen) (f)
  - Synchronized 10m winners: China (YU Duan & YAO Zelin) (m) / China (LU Wei & ZHU Yanxin) (f)
  - Mixed Synchronized winners: Germany (Frithjof Seidel & Jana Lisa Rother) (3m) / Canada (Meaghan Benfeito & Nathan Zsombor-Murray) (10m)
- July 6 – 8: DGP #3 in Bolzano
  - 3m Springboard winners: (China) LIU Chengming (m) / (China) CHEN Yiwen (f)
  - 10m Platform winners: (China) Tai Xiaohu (m) / (China) ZHANG Xiaotong (f)
  - Synchronized 3m winners: China (LIU Chengming & PENG Jianfeng) (m) / China (WU Chunting & CHEN Yiwen) (f)
  - Synchronized 10m winners: China (Tai Xiaohu & HUANG Bowen) (m) / China (ZHANG Xiaotong & JIAO Jingjing) (f)
  - Mixed Synchronized winners: United States (Alison Gibson & Greg Duncan) (3m) / Italy (Noemi Batki & Maicol Verzotto) (10m)
- July 13 – 15: DGP #4 in (Spain) Madrid
  - 3m Springboard winners: (Mexico) Juan Manuel Celaya Hernandez (m) / (China) CHEN Yiwen (f)
  - 10m Platform winners: (China) Tai Xiaohu (m) / (United States) Samantha Bromberg (f)
  - Synchronized 3m winners: Mexico (Yahel Castillo & Juan Manuel Celaya Hernandez) (m) / China (WU Chunting & CHEN Yiwen) (f)
  - Synchronized 10m winners: China (Tai Xiaohu & HUANG Bowen) (m) / China (ZHANG Xiaotong & JIAO Jingjing) (f)
- November 9 – 11: DGP #5 in Kuala Lumpur
  - 3m Springboard winners: (Malaysia) Ooi Tze Liang (m) / (China) MA Tong (f)
  - 10m Platform winners: (China) YU Duan (m) / (China) XU Yijin (f)
  - Synchronized 3m winners: Malaysia (Muhammad Syafiq Puteh & Ooi Tze Liang) (m) / Malaysia (Loh Zhiayi Loh & ONG Ker Ying) (f; default)
  - Men's Synchronized 10m winners: China (WANG Zewei & YU Duan)
- November 15 – 18: DGP #6 in Gold Coast, Queensland
  - 3m Springboard winners: (Australia) Kevin Chávez (m) / (China) Huang Xiaohui (f)
  - 10m Platform winners: (Russia) Nikita Shleikher (m) / (Australia) Emily Boyd (f)
  - Synchronized 3m winners: Poland (Andrzej Rzeszutek & Kacper Lesiak) (m) / Australia (Georgia Sheehan & Esther Qin) (f)
  - Men's Synchronized 10m winners: Russia (Aleksandr Belevtsev & Nikita Shleikher) (m; default)
  - Mixed Synchronized winners: Australia (Anabelle Smith & Domonic Bedggood) (3m) / Germany (Christina Wassen & Florian Fandler) (10m; default)
- November 23 – 25: DGP #7 (final) in Singapore
  - 3m Springboard winners: (Russia) Sergey Nazin (m) / (China) Huang Xiaohui (f)
  - 10m Platform winners: (Singapore) Jonathan Chan (m) / (Japan) Rin Kaneto (f)
  - Synchronized 3m winners: Singapore (Timothy Han-Kuan Lee & Mark Han-Ming Lee) (m) / Russia (Vitaliia Koroleva & Uliana Kliueva) (f; default)
  - Synchronized 10m winners: Mexico (Iván García & Germán Sánchez) (m) / North Korea (KIM A Rim & KIM Jong Gyong) (f)
  - Mixed Synchronized winners: Russia (Ilia Molchanov & Vitaliia Koroleva) (3m) / North Korea (KIM A Rim & RI Kwon Hyok) (10m; default)

=== 2018 FINA Artistic Swimming World Series ===
- March 9 – 11: ASWS #1 in (France) Paris
  - Solo Technical/Free winners: (Russia) Varvara Subbotina / (Russia) Svetlana Kolesnichenko
  - Duet Technical/Free winners: Russia (Svetlana Kolesnichenko & Varvara Subbotina) / China (Wang Liuyi & Wang Qianyi)
  - Team Technical/Free winners: Russia / Ukraine
  - Mixed Duet Technical/Free winners: Italy (Manila Flamini & Giorgio Minisini) / Russia (Aleksandr Maltsev & Mayya Gurbanberdieva)
  - Free Combinations winners: Ukraine
  - Team Highlights winners: Ukraine
- April 20 – 22: ASWS #2 in Beijing
  - Solo Technical/Free winners: (Slovakia) Nada Daabousová / (Uzbekistan) Khonzodakhon Toshkhujaeva
  - Duet Technical/Free winners: China (Jiang Tingting & Jiang Wenwen) (both)
  - Team Technical/Free winners: China (both)
  - Mixed Duet Technical/Free winners: China (SHI Haoyu & Zhang Yiyao) (both & default)
  - Free Combinations winners: China
  - Team Highlights winners: Uzbekistan
- April 27 – 30: ASWS #3 in Tokyo
  - Solo Technical/Free winner: (Japan) Yukiko Inui (both)
  - Duet Technical/Free winners: Japan (Kanami Nakamaki & Yukiko Inui) (both)
  - Team Technical/Free winners: Japan (both)
  - Mixed Duet Technical/Free winners: Italy (Manila Flamini & Giorgio Minisini) (both)
  - Free Combinations winners: Japan (default)
  - Team Highlights winners: France
- May 11 – 13: ASWS #4 in Šamorín
  - Solo Technical/Free winner: (Italy) Linda Cerruti (both)
  - Duet Technical/Free winners: Italy (Costanza Ferro & Linda Cerruti) (both)
  - Team Technical/Free winners: Belarus / Ukraine
  - Mixed Duet Technical/Free winners: Spain (Nayara Maria Pena & Ibon Garcia) (both & default)
  - Free Combinations winners: Ukraine
  - Team Highlights winners: Slovakia (default)
- May 18 – 20: ASWS #5 in (Hungary) Budapest
  - Solo Technical/Free winner: (Russia) Varvara Subbotina (both)
  - Duet Technical/Free winners: Ukraine (Yelyzaveta Yakhno & Anastasiya Savchuk) (both)
  - Team Technical/Free winners: Russia (both)
  - Free Combinations winners: Ukraine
  - Team Highlights winners: Ukraine
- May 25 – 27: ASWS #6 in Madrid
  - Solo Technical/Free winner: (Switzerland) Vivienne Koch (both)
  - Duet Technical/Free winners: Spain (Sara Saldana Lopez & Paula Ramirez) (both)
  - Team Technical/Free winners: Spain (both)
  - Mixed Duet Technical/Free winners: Spain (Pau Ribes & Berta Ferreras Sanz) (both -> Free event won by default)
  - Free Combinations winners: Spain
- May 31 – June 2: ASWS #7 in (Canada) Surrey, British Columbia
  - Solo Technical/Free winner: (Japan) Yukiko Inui (both)
  - Duet Technical/Free winners: Japan (Kanami Nakamaki & Yukiko Inui) (both)
  - Team Technical/Free winners: Ukraine (both)
  - Mixed Duet Technical winner: South Korea (LEE Ga-bin & BYUN Jae-jun) (default)
  - Free Combinations winners: Ukraine
  - Team Highlights winners: Ukraine
- June 7 – 9: ASWS #8 in (United States) Los Angeles
  - Solo Technical/Free winner: (Ukraine) Yelyzaveta Yakhno (both)
  - Duet Technical/Free winners: China (Jiang Tingting & Jiang Wenwen) (both)
  - Team Technical/Free winners: Ukraine (both)
  - Mixed Duet Technical/Free winners: Italy (Manila Flamini & Giorgio Minisini) (both)
  - Free Combinations winners: Ukraine
  - Team Highlights winners: Ukraine
- June 15 – 17: ASWS #9 in (Greece) Syros
  - Solo Technical/Free winner: (Mexico) Joana Betzabe Jimenez Garcia / (Mexico) Nuria Diosdado
  - Duet Technical/Free winners: Mexico (Karem Achach & Nuria Diosdado) (both)
  - Team Technical/Free winners: Mexico (both)
  - Mixed Duet Technical/Free winners: Italy (Manila Flamini & Giorgio Minisini) / Russia (Mayya Gurbanberdieva & Aleksandr Maltsev)
  - Free Combinations winners: Mexico
  - Team Highlights winners: France
- June 29 – July 1: ASWS #10 (final) in Tashkent
  - Solo Technical/Free winner: (Mexico) Joana Betzabe Jimenez Garcia / (Mexico) Nuria Diosdado
  - Duet Technical/Free winners: Mexico (Karem Achach & Nuria Diosdado) (both with Joana Betzabe Jimenez Garcia in free event only)
  - Team Technical/Free winners: Uzbekistan (both)
  - Mixed Duet Technical/Free winners: Kazakhstan (Sofiya Lyakh & Olzhas Makhanbetiyarov) / Uzbekistan (Dinara Ibragimova & Vyacheslav Rudnev)
  - Free Combinations winners: Slovakia
  - Team Highlights winners: Uzbekistan

=== 2018 FINA Swimming World Cup ===
- September 7 – 9: SWC #1 in Kazan
  - Russia won both the gold and overall medal tallies.
- September 13 – 15: SWC #2 in (Qatar) Doha
  - Hungary won the gold medal tally. Netherlands won the overall medal tally.
- September 28 – 30: SWC #3 in (Netherlands) Eindhoven
  - Russia won both the gold and overall medal tallies.
- October 4 – 6: SWC #4 in (Hungary) Budapest
  - Australia won the gold medal tally. United States won the overall medal tally.
- November 2 – 4: SWC #5 in Beijing
  - China won both the gold and overall medal tallies.
- November 9 – 11: SWC #6 in Tokyo
  - Russia won the gold medal tally. Japan won the overall medal tally.
- November 15 – 17: SWC #7 (final) in Singapore
  - China won the gold medal tally. Australia won the overall medal tally.

== Canoeing ==
=== Canoe sprint ===
==== International canoe sprint championships ====
- February 9 – 11: 2018 Oceania Canoe Sprint Championships in (Australia) Penrith
  - For results, click here.
- June 8 – 10: 2018 Canoe Sprint European Championships in (Serbia) Belgrade
  - Hungary won both the gold and overall medal tallies.
- June 28 – July 1: 2018 European Junior & U23 Canoe Sprint Championships in (Italy) Auronzo
  - Junior: Belarus won the gold medal tally. Belarus, Czech Republic, & Russia won 8 overall medals each.
  - U23: Belarus & Poland won 3 gold and 7 overall medals each.
- July 26 – 29: 2018 ICF Junior and U23 Canoe Sprint World Championships in (Bulgaria) Plovdiv
  - Junior: Hungary won both the gold and overall medal tallies.
  - U23: Hungary and Germany won 4 gold medals each. Hungary, Germany, and Belarus won 6 overall medals each.
- August 10 – 12: 2018 World University Canoe Sprint Championship in Szolnok
  - Hungary won the gold medal tally. Belarus won the overall medal tally.
- August 22 – 26: 2018 ICF Canoe Sprint World Championships in (Portugal) Montemor-o-Velho
  - Germany won both the gold and overall medal tallies.
- September 13 – 16: 2018 Pan American Canoe Sprint Championship in Dartmouth
  - Senior: Canada won both the gold and overall medal tallies.
  - Junior: Canada won both the gold and overall medal tallies.

==== 2018 Canoe Sprint World Cup ====
- May 18 – 20: CSWC #1 in Szeged
  - Hungary, Spain, and New Zealand won 4 gold medals each. Hungary won the overall medal tally.
  - Note: For detailed results, click here.
- May 25 – 27: CSWC #2 (final) in Duisburg
  - Germany won both the gold and overall medal tallies.
  - Note: For detailed results, click here.

=== Canoe slalom ===
==== International canoe slalom championships ====
- January 27 – 29: 2018 Oceania Canoe Slalom Championships in (New Zealand) Auckland
  - K1 winners: (Australia) Lucien Delfour (m) / (Czech Republic) Kateřina Kudějová (f)
  - C1 winners: (France) Kilian Foulon (m) / (Australia) Jessica Fox (f)
- June 1 – 3: 2018 European Canoe Slalom Championships in Prague
  - C1 winners: (United Kingdom) Ryan Westley (m) / (Austria) Viktoria Wolffhardt (f)
  - C1 team winners: France (m) / Great Britain (f)
  - Men's C2 winners: Czech Republic (Jonáš Kašpar & Marek Šindler)
  - Men's C2 team winners: Germany
  - K1 winners: (Slovenia) Peter Kauzer (m) / (Germany) Ricarda Funk (f)
  - K1 team winners: Czech Republic (m) / Germany (f)
- July 17 – 22: 2018 World Junior and U23 Canoe Slalom Championships in (Italy) Ivrea
  - Czech Republic won both the gold and overall medal tallies.
- August 15 – 19: 2018 European Junior and U23 Canoe Slalom Championships in (Slovakia) Bratislava
  - Czech Republic and Spain won 4 gold medals each. Czech Republic won the overall medal tally.
- September 26 – 30: 2018 ICF Canoe Slalom World Championships in (Brazil) Rio de Janeiro
  - C1 winners: (Germany) Franz Anton (m) / (Australia) Jessica Fox (f)
  - C1 team winners: Slovakia (m) / Great Britain (f)
  - K1 winners: (Germany) Hannes Aigner (m) / (Australia) Jessica Fox (f)
  - K1 team winners: Great Britain (m) / France (f)
  - Extreme K1 winners: (Italy) Christian de Dionigi (m) / (Brazil) Ana Sátila (f)
  - Mixed C2 winners: Poland (Marcin Pochwała & Aleksandra Stach)

==== 2018 Canoe Slalom World Cup ====
- June 22 – 24: #1 in Liptovský Mikuláš
  - C1 winners: (Germany) Sideris Tasiadis (m) / (Australia) Jessica Fox (f)
  - C2 Mixed Team winners: Slovakia (Sona Stanovska & Ján Bátik)
  - K1 winners: (Germany) Sebastian Schubert (m) / (Australia) Jessica Fox (f)
  - Extreme K1 winners: (Russia) Pavel Eigel (m) / (United States) Sage Donnelly (f)
- June 29 – July 1: #2 in (Poland) Kraków
  - C1 winners: (United Kingdom) David Florence (m) / (Australia) Jessica Fox (f)
  - Mixed Team C2 winners: Czech Republic (Tereza Fišerová & Jakub Jáně)
  - K1 winners: (United Kingdom) Joe Clarke (m) / (Australia) Jessica Fox (f)
  - Extreme K1 winners: (Russia) Nikita Gubenko (m) / (Russia) Polina Mukhgaleeva (f)
- July 6 – 8: #3 in Augsburg
  - C1 winners: (Germany) Sideris Tasiadis (m) / (Australia) Jessica Fox (f)
  - C2 Mixed Team winners: Germany (Jasmin Schornberg & Thomas Becker)
  - K1 winners: (Slovenia) Peter Kauzer (m) / (Australia) Jessica Fox (f)
  - Extreme K1 winners: (Russia) Pavel Eigel (m) / (Brazil) Ana Sátila (f)
- August 31 – September 2: #4 in (Slovenia) Tacen
  - Note: The Women's C1 and Men's K1 final results came from Friday's heats of those events.
  - C1 winners: (Germany) Sideris Tasiadis (m) / (Australia) Jessica Fox (f)
  - C2 Mixed Team winners: Czech Republic (Veronika Vojtová & Jan Mašek)
  - K1 winners: (Slovenia) Žan Jakše (m) / (Austria) Corinna Kuhnle (f)
- September 7 – 9: #5 (final) in (Spain) La Seu d'Urgell
  - C1 winners: (Slovenia) Luka Božič (m) / (Australia) Jessica Fox (f)
  - Mixed Team C2 winners: Czech Republic (Tereza Fišerová & Jakub Jáně)
  - K1 winners: (Italy) Giovanni De Gennaro (m) / (Germany) Ricarda Funk (f)

=== Other international canoeing events ===
- May 31 – June 3: 2018 ICF Wildwater Canoeing World Championships in (Switzerland) Muotathal
  - For detailed results, click here.
- July 5 – 8: 2018 European Canoe Marathon Championships in (Croatia) Metković
  - Senior
  - C1 winners: (Spain) Manuel Campos (m) / (Ukraine) Liudmyla Babak (f)
  - Men's C2 winners: Spain (Diego Romero & Oscar Graña)
  - K1 winners: (Portugal) José Ramalho (m) / (Hungary) Renáta Csay (f)
  - K2 winners: Hungary (Adrián Boros & László Solti) (m) / Hungary (Vanda Kiszli & Sára Mihalik) (f)
  - Junior
  - Junior C1 winners: (Hungary) Jordán Fajta (m) / (Hungary) Dóra Horányi (f)
  - Junior Men's C2 winners: Hungary (Zoltán Vass & Bence Bucsi)
  - Junior K1 winners: (Republic of Ireland) Ronan Foley (m) / (United Kingdom) Emma Russell (f)
  - Junior K2 winners: Hungary (Marcell Mercz & Ádám Horváth) (m) / Hungary (Viktória Tófalvi & Csilla Rugási) (f)
  - U23
  - Men's U23 C1 winner: (Poland) Mateusz Borgiel
  - U23 K1 winners: (Germany) Nico Paufler (m) / (Hungary) Zsófia Czéllai-Vörös (f)
- August 1 – 5: 2018 ICF Canoe Polo World Championships in (Canada) Welland
  - Men: Germany defeated Italy, 4–1, in the final. Spain took third place.
  - Women: Germany defeated Great Britain, 3–1, in the final. Italy took third place.
  - U21 Men: Great Britain defeated Germany, 3–2, in the final. Italy took third place.
  - U21 Women: Germany defeated Poland, 5–1, in the final. New Zealand took third place.
- August 30 – September 2: 2018 ICF Stand-Up Paddling World Championships in Esposende & Viana do Castelo (debut event)
  - Event cancelled, due to a court order in Portugal.
- September 6 – 9: 2018 ICF Canoe Marathon World Championship in (Portugal) Prado Vila Verde
  - C1 winners: (Spain) Manuel Campos (m) / (Ukraine) Liudmyla Babak (f)
  - Men's C2 winners: Spain (Diego Romero & Oscar Graña)
  - K1 winners: (South Africa) Andrew Birkett (m) / (Hungary) Vanda Kiszli (f)
  - K2 winners: South Africa (Andrew Birkett & Hank McGregor) (m) / Hungary (Renáta Csay & Zsófia Czéllai-Vörös) (f)
  - Junior C1 winners: (Hungary) Dávid Hodován (m) / (Canada) Marlee MacIntosh (f)
  - Junior K1 winners: (Denmark) Thorbjørn Rask (m) / (Hungary) Zsóka Csikós (f)
  - Junior K2 winners: Denmark (Thorbjørn Rask & Nikolai Thomsen) (m) / Hungary (Olga Bakó & Emese Kohalmi) (f)
  - Men's U23 C1 winner: (Portugal) Sérgio Maciel
  - U23 K1 winners: (Norway) Jon Vold (m) / (Hungary) Zsófia Czéllai-Vörös (f)
- September 13 – 16: 2018 ICF Dragon Boat World Championships in (United States) Gainesville, Georgia
  - For detailed results, click here.

== Rowing ==
=== International rowing events ===
- May 26 & 27: 2018 European Rowing Junior Championships in (France) Gravelines
  - Czech Republic won the gold medal tally. Italy won the overall medal tally.
- July 25 – 29: 2018 World Rowing Under 23 Championships in (Poland) Poznań
  - United States won the gold medal tally. Italy won the overall medal tally.
- August 2 – 5: 2018 European Rowing Championships in (United Kingdom) Glasgow
  - Romania won the gold medal tally. Romania and Netherlands won 7 overall medals each.
- August 8 – 12: 2018 World Rowing Junior Championships in (Czech Republic) Račice
  - Five national teams won 2 gold medals each. United States won the overall medal tally.
- August 10 – 12: 2018 World University Rowing Championships in (China) Shanghai
  - Great Britain won the gold medal tally. Italy won the overall medal tally.
- September 1 & 2: 2018 European Rowing Under 23 Championships in Brest
  - Romania won the gold medal tally. Romania and Belarus won 8 overall medals each.
- September 9 – 16: 2018 World Rowing Championships in (Bulgaria) Plovdiv
  - United States, Italy, Germany, and France won 3 gold medals each. The United States won the overall medal tally.
- September 26 – 30: 2018 World Rowing Masters Regatta in (United States) Sarasota-Bradenton
  - For detailed results, click here.

=== 2018 World Rowing Cup ===
- June 1 – 3: #1 in (Serbia) Belgrade
  - Netherlands won both the gold and overall medal tallies.
- June 22 – 24: #2 in (Austria) Linz-Ottensheim
  - Italy won the gold medal tally. Germany won the overall medal tally.
- July 13 – 15: #3 (final) in (Switzerland) Lucerne
  - New Zealand won the gold medal tally. Germany won the overall medal tally.

== Sailing ==
=== International sailing events ===
- August 20, 2017 – July 28: Clipper Round the World Yacht Race, starting and finishing in (United Kingdom) Liverpool
  - Winner: (China) Sanya Serenity Coast (Skipper: (Australia) Wendy Tuck)
- October 14, 2017 – June 30: 2017–18 Volvo Ocean Race, starting in (Spain) Alicante and finishing in (Netherlands) The Hague
  - Winners: (China) Dongfeng Race Team (Skipper: (France) Charles Caudrelier)
- June 18 – 25: 2018 Asian Sailing Championship in (Indonesia) Jakarta
  - China won both the gold and overall medal tallies.
- July 14 – 21: 2018 Youth Sailing World Championships in Corpus Christi, Texas
  - United States won both the gold and overall medal tallies.
- July 30 – August 12: 2018 Sailing World Championships in (Denmark) Aarhus
  - Netherlands won the gold medal tally. France won 7 overall medals.
- September 1 – 5: 2018 World University Sailing Championship in Cherbourg
  - Winners: Australia (Skipper: Thomas Grimes) (m) / France (Skipper: Elodie Bonafous) (f)

=== 2018 Sailing World Cup ===
- October 15 – 22, 2017: SWC #1 in Gamagōri
  - Poland won the gold medal tally. Japan won the overall medal tally.
- January 21 – 28: SWC #2 in (United States) Miami
  - Great Britain won both the gold and overall medal tallies.
- April 22 – 29: SWC #3 in Hyères
  - France won both the gold and overall medal tallies.
- June 3 – 10: SWC #4 (final) in Marseille
  - Eight different team won a gold medal each. France, Great Britain, & Italy won 3 overall medals each.

=== 2018 Extreme Sailing Series ===
- March 14 – 17: Act 1 in Muscat
  - Champions: (Switzerland) Alinghi; Second: (Denmark) SAP Extreme Sailing Team; Third: Oman Air
- May 24 – 27: Act 2 (GC32 World Championship) in (Italy) Riva del Garda
  - Champions: (Denmark) SAP Extreme Sailing Team; Second: Oman Air; Third: (United Kingdom) INEOS Rebels UK
- June 14 – 17: Act 3 in (Spain) Barcelona
  - Champions: (Switzerland) Alinghi; Second: Oman Air; Third: (Denmark) SAP Extreme Sailing Team
- July 5 – 8: Act 4 in (Portugal) Cascais
  - Champions: (Switzerland) Alinghi; Second: (Denmark) SAP Extreme Sailing Team; Third: (United Kingdom) INEOS Rebels UK
- August 24 – 27: Act 5 in (United Kingdom) Cardiff
  - Champions: (Switzerland) Alinghi; Second: (Denmark) SAP Extreme Sailing Team; Third: Oman Air
- October 18 – 21: Act 6 in (United States) San Diego
  - Champions: Oman Air; Second: (Switzerland) Alinghi; Third: (Denmark) SAP Extreme Sailing Team
- November 29 – December 2: Act 7 (final) in (Mexico) Los Cabos
  - Champions: (Switzerland) Alinghi; Second: (Austria) Red Bull Sailing Team; Third: Oman Air

== Surfing ==
=== ISA ===
- January 19 – 25: 2018 ISA World Longboard Surfing Championship in (China) Wanning
  - Open winners: (Hawaii) Kai Sallas (m) / (United States) Tory Gilkerson (f)
  - Aloha Cup winners: United States
  - Team points winners: United States
- September 15 – 22: 2018 ISA World Surfing Games in Tahara, Aichi
  - Open winners: (Argentina) Santiago Muñiz (m) / (Australia) Sally Fitzgibbons (f)
  - Aloha Cup winners: Spain
  - Team points winners: Japan
- October 27 – November 4: 2018 ISA World Junior Surfing Championship in Huntington Beach
  - Boys' winners: (Japan) Keanu Kamiyama (U18) / (Australia) Grayson Hinrichs (U16)
  - Girls' winners: (Germany) Rachel Presti (U18) / (United States) Caitlin Simmers (U16)
  - Aloha Cup winners: United States
  - Team points winners: Japan
- November 23 – December 2: 2018 ISA World SUP and Paddleboard Championship in (China) Wanning
  - SUP Surfing winners: (Brazil) Luiz Diniz (m) / (Australia) Shakira Westdorp (f)
  - SUP Distance Racing winners: (Australia) Michael Booth (m) / (France) Olivia Piana (f)
  - Paddle Distance Racing winners: (United States) Hunter Pflueger (m) / (Australia) Grace Rosato (f)
  - SUP Tech Racing winners: (Hungary) Daniel Hasulyo (m) / (United States) Candice Appleby (f)
  - Paddle Tech Racing winners: (Australia) Lachie Lansdown (m) / (Australia) Grace Rosato (f)
  - Team Relay Race winners: Australia (Lachie Lansdown, Terrene Black, Grace Rosato, & Harry Maskell)
  - Junior winners: (United States) Ryan Funk (m) / (United States) Jade Howson (f)
  - Sprint Race winners: (Brazil) Arthur Carvalho (m) / (France) Amandine Chazot (f)
  - Team Points winners: Australia
- December 12 – 16: 2018 ISA World Adaptive Surfing Championship in La Jolla
  - Brazil and Australia won 2 gold medals each. Brazil and United States won 5 overall medals each.
  - Team Points winners: 1. United States, 2. Brazil, 3. Chile

=== 2018 World Surf League ===
- March 11 – 22: (Australia) Quiksilver Pro Gold Coast 2018
  - Winners: (Australia) Julian Wilson (m) / (United States) Lakey Peterson (f)
- March 28 – April 8: (Australia) Rip Curl Pro 2018
  - Winners: (Brazil) Italo Ferreira (m) / (Australia) Stephanie Gilmore (f)
- April 11 – 22: (Australia) Margaret River Pro 2018
  - Event cancelled, due to shark and safety concerns.
- May 11 – 20: (Brazil) Oi Rio Pro 2018
  - Winners: (Brazil) Filipe Toledo (m) / (Australia) Stephanie Gilmore (f)
- May 27 – June 9: (Indonesia) Bali Pro Keramas 2018
  - Winners: (Brazil) Italo Ferreira (m) / (United States) Lakey Peterson (f)
- July 3 – 16: (South Africa) J-Bay Open 2018
  - Winner: (Brazil) Filipe Toledo (m) / (Australia) Stephanie Gilmore (f)
- July 30 – August 5: (United States) Vans US Open of Surfing 2018 (Women only)
  - Winner: (United States) Courtney Conlogue
- August 10 – 21: (French Polynesia) Billabong Pro Teahupoo 2018 (Men only)
  - Winner: (Brazil) Gabriel Medina
- September 5 – 9: (United States) Surf Ranch Lemoore 2018
  - Winners: (Brazil) Gabriel Medina (m) / (Hawaii) Carissa Moore (f)
- October 3 – 14: Quiksilver Pro France 2018
  - Winners: (Australia) Julian Wilson (m) / (United States) Courtney Conlogue (f)
- October 16 – 27: MEO Rip Curl Pro Portugal 2018 (Men only)
  - Winner: (Brazil) Italo Ferreira
- November 25 – December 6: (Hawaii) Maui Women's Pro 2018 (Women only; final)
  - Winner: (Hawaii) Carissa Moore
- December 8 – 20: (Hawaii) Billabong Pipeline Masters 2018 (Men only; final)
  - Winner: (Brazil) Gabriel Medina

== Water polo ==
=== 2018 FINA Men's Water Polo World League ===
- November 14, 2017 – April 10, 2018: 2017–18 FINA Men's European Water Polo Preliminary Rounds
  - Qualified teams to Super Final: Croatia, Hungary, Montenegro, & Spain
- April 3 – 8: 2018 FINA Men's Intercontinental Water Polo Tournament in (New Zealand) Auckland
  - Champions: United States; Second: Australia; Third: Japan; Fourth: Kazakhstan
  - Note: All four teams mentioned above all qualified to compete in the 2018 Superfinal.
- June 18 – 23: 2018 FINA Men's Water Polo World League Superfinal in Budapest
  - Montenegro defeated Hungary, 13–11, to win their second FINA Men's Water Polo World League title.
  - Spain took third place.

=== 2018 FINA Women's Water Polo World League ===
- November 21, 2017 – May 1, 2018: 2017–18 FINA Women's European Water Polo Preliminary Rounds
  - Qualified teams to Superfinal: Spain, Russia, and Netherlands
- April 3 – 8: 2018 FINA Women's Intercontinental Water Polo Tournament in (New Zealand) Auckland
  - Champions: United States; Second: Australia; Third: Canada; Fourth: China; Fifth: Japan
  - Note: All five teams mentioned above all qualified to compete in the 2018 Superfinal.
- May 28 – June 2: 2018 FINA Women's Water Polo League Superfinal in (China) Kunshan
  - United States defeated Netherlands, 8–6, to win their fifth consecutive and 12th overall FINA Women's Water Polo League title.
  - Russia took third place.

=== World water polo events ===
- August 11 – 19: 2018 FINA Youth Water Polo World Championships in Szombathely
  - Greece defeated Spain, 9–8, to win their first FINA Youth Water Polo World Championships title.
  - Hungary took third place.
- August 26 – September 2: 2018 LEN European U19 Water Polo Championship in (Belarus) Minsk
  - Greece defeated Montenegro, 14–12, to win their first LEN European U19 Water Polo Championship title.
  - Spain took third place.
- August 27 – September 2: 2018 FINA World Women's Youth Water Polo Championships in (Serbia) Belgrade
  - Spain defeated Italy, 8–7, to win their first FINA World Women's Youth Water Polo Championship title.
  - Greece took third place.
- September 9 – 16: 2018 Women's LEN European U19 Water Polo Championships in (Portugal) Funchal
  - Spain defeated Russia, 12–8, to win their first LEN Women's European U19 Water Polo Championship title.
  - Netherlands took third place.

=== Ligue Européenne de Natation ===
- September 14, 2017 – June 9, 2018: 2017–18 LEN Champions League (final eight in (Italy) Genoa)
  - (Greece) Olympiacos defeated (Italy) Pro Recco, 9–7, to win their second LEN Champions League title.
  - (Spain) CNA Barceloneta took third place.
- September 27, 2017 – April 18, 2018: 2017–18 LEN Euro Cup
  - (Hungary) Ferencvárosi TC defeated (Italy) Banco BPM SM Busto, 17–13 in a 2-legged final, to win their second consecutive LEN Euro Cup title.
- March 22 – 24: 2018 LEN Women's Europa Cup Super Final in Pontevedra (debut event)
  - Greece defeated Russia, 9–8, to win the inaugural LEN Women's Europa Cup title.
  - Spain took third place.
- April 5 – 8: 2018 LEN Men's Europa Cup Super Final in Rijeka (debut event)
  - Croatia defeated Spain, 12–9, to win the inaugural LEN Men's Europa Cup title.
  - Italy took third place.
- July 14 – 28: 2018 European Water Polo Championship for Men and Women in Barcelona
  - Men: Serbia defeated Spain, 12–10, to win their fourth consecutive and eighth overall Men's European Water Polo Championship title.
    - Croatia took third place.
  - Women: Netherlands defeated Greece, 6–4, to win their fifth Women's European Water Polo Championship title.
    - Spain took third place.
- November 10: 2018 Women's LEN Super Cup Final in (Russia) Kirishi
  - (Hungary) Dunaujvaros defeated (Russia) Kinef-Surgutneftegas, 4–2 in penalties and after an 11–11 score in regular play, to win their first Women's LEN Super Cup title.
- November 30: 2018 LEN Super Cup for Men Final in (Hungary) Budapest
  - (Hungary) Ferencvárosi defeated (Greece) Olympiacos, 4–2 in penalties and after a 7–7 score in regular play, to win their first Men's LEN Super Cup title.

=== UANA ===
- May 1 – 9: 2018 UANA Water Polo Cup in Cochabamba
  - Colombia defeated Argentina 12–6, to win their 1st UANA Water Polo Cup.
  - Chile took third place and Bolivia too fourth place.
