= Corona Bali Protected 2018 =

World Surf League event

Keramas CT 2018
- Location: Keramas Beach, Gianyar, Bali, Indonesia
- Dates: 27 May to 09 June 2018
- Competitors: 36 from 10 nations

Medalists
gold medal	Italo Ferreira	Brazil
silver medal	Michel Bourez	French Polynesia

The Bali Pro 2018 was an event of the 2018 World Surf League. It was held from 27 May to 9 June at Keramas Beach, Gianyar, Bali, Indonesia, and contested by 36 surfers.

== Round 1 ==
Heat 1
1	Joel Parkinson	(Australia)	10.37
2	Italo Ferreira	(Brazil)	10.10
3	Keanu Asing	(Hawaii)	7.17

Heat 2
1	Owen Wright	(Australia)	14.17
2	M. February	(South Africa)	9.74
3	Ezekiel Lau	(Hawaii)	9.57

Heat 3
1	John Florence	(Hawaii)	15.17
2	M. Rodrigues	(Brazil)	8.00
3	Miguel Pupo	(Brazil)	4.16

Heat 4
1	Conner Coffin	(United States)	10.94
2	Filipe Toledo	(Brazil)	9.46
3	Mikey Wright	(Australia)	5.84

Heat 5
1	Gabriel Medina	(Brazil)	5.60
2	Barron Mamiya	(Hawaii)	2.97
3	Tomas Hermes	(Brazil)	2.07

Heat 6
1	Julian Wilson	(Australia)	11.50
2	Connor O'Leary	(Australia)	6.44
3	Oney Anwar	(Indonesia)	6.27

Heat 7
1	Jérémy Florès	(France)	8.77
2	Kolohe Andino	(United States)	8.66
3	Ian Gouveia	(Brazil)	2.73

Heat 8
1	Jordy Smith	(South Africa)	15.10
2	Joan Duru	(France)	13.04
3	Kanoa Igarashi	(Japan)	8.33

Heat 9
1	Griffin Colapinto	(United States)	15.07
2	Adrian Buchan	(Australia)	10.83
3	Jesse Mendes	(Brazil)	9.40

Heat 10
1	Michel Bourez	(French Polynesia)	12.16
2	P. Gudauskas	(United States)	8.57
3	Matt Wilkinson	(Australia)	5.67

Heat 11
1	Willian Cardoso	(Brazil)	7.84
2	Frederico Morais	(Portugal)	6.44
3	W. Carmichael	(Australia)	4.63

Heat 12
1	A. de Souza	(Brazil)	15.50
2	Sebastian Zietz	(Hawaii)	8.67
3	Yago Dora	(Brazil)	2.17

== Round 2 ==
Heat 1: 1 / Filipe Toledo / (Brazil) / 12.77; 2 / Oney Anwar / (Indonesia) / 11.00	Heat 2: 1 / Italo Ferreira / (Brazil) / 11.84; 2 / Barron Mamiya / (Hawaii) / 11.14	Heat 3: 1 / Mikey Wright / (Australia) / 14.17; 2 / Kolohe Andino / (United States) / 7.83	Heat 4: 1 / Adrian Buchan / (Australia) / 9.90; 2 / Miguel Pupo / (Brazil) / 8.76

Heat 5: 1 / M. February / (South Africa) / 9.56; 2 / W. Carmichael / (Australia) / 6.73	Heat 6: 1 / Keanu Asing / (Hawaii) / 8.47; 2 / Sebastian Zietz / (Hawaii) / 8.00	Heat 7: 1 / Frederico Morais / (Portugal) / 12.07; 2 / Ian Gouveia / (Brazil) / 8.43	Heat 8: 1 / Matt Wilkinson / (Australia) / 14.64; 2 / Joan Duru / (France) / 7.00

Heat 9: 1 / Jesse Mendes / (Brazil) / 12.33; 2 / Kanoa Igarashi / (Japan) / 10.56	Heat 10: 1 / Ezekiel Lau / (Hawaii) / 15.57; 2 / P. Gudauskas / (United States) / 8.67	Heat 11: 1 / M. Rodrigues / (Brazil) / 11.40; 2 / Yago Dora / (Brazil) / 11.27	Heat 12: 1 / Tomas Hermes / (Brazil) / 12.66; 2 / Connor O'Leary / (Australia) / 11.34

== Round 3 ==
Heat 1: 1 / Jesse Mendes / (Brazil) / 13.34; 2 / John Florence / (Hawaii) / 11.37	Heat 2: 1 / Michel Bourez / (French Polynesia) / 15.17; 2 / Ezekiel Lau / (Hawaii) / 12.97	Heat 3: 1 / Willian Cardoso / (Brazil) / 12.00; 2 / Owen Wright / (Australia) / 10.37	Heat 4: 1 / Adrian Buchan / (Australia) / 11.40; 2 / M. Rodrigues / (Brazil) / 8.83

Heat 5: 1 / Griffin Colapinto / (United States) / 15.84; 2 / Matt Wilkinson / (Australia) / 15.40	Heat 6: 1 / Mikey Wright / (Australia) / 12.27; 2 / Julian Wilson / (Australia) / 11.83	Heat 7: 1 / Gabriel Medina / (Brazil) / 15.70; 2 / Michael February / (South Africa) / 9.44	Heat 8: 1 / Jérémy Florès / (France) / 16.04; 2 / Frederico Morais / (Portugal) / 13.50

Heat 9: 1 / Jordy Smith / (South Africa) / 16.36; 2 / Conner Coffin / (United States) / 9.00	Heat 10: 1 / Italo Ferreira / (Brazil) / 14.30; 2 / Tomas Hermes / (Brazil) / 10.10	Heat 11: 1 / A. de Souza / (Brazil) / 14.13; 2 / Joel Parkinson / (Australia) / 13.46	Heat 12: 1 / Filipe Toledo / (Brazil) / 14.43; 2 / Keanu Asing / (Hawaii) / 8.43

== Round 4 ==
Heat 1
1	Michel Bourez	(French Polynesia)	17.00
2	Willian Cardoso	(Brazil)	13.60
3	Jesse Mendes	(Brazil)	11.66

Heat 2
1	Mikey Wright	(Australia)	15.80
2	Griffin Colapinto	(United States)	13.73
3	Adrian Buchan	(Australia)	12.50

Heat 3
1	Jordy Smith	(South Africa)	11.76
2	Jérémy Florès	(France)	11.70
3	Gabriel Medina	(Brazil)	10.76

Heat 4
1	Italo Ferreira	(Brazil)	17.00
2	Filipe Toledo	(Brazil)	13.87
3	A. de Souza	(Brazil)	13.16

== Quarter finals ==
Heat 1: 1 / Michel Bourez / (French Polynesia) / 16.17; 2 / Griffin Colapinto / (United States) / 14.83	Heat 2: 1 / Mikey Wright / (Australia) / 14.93; 2 / Willian Cardoso / (Brazil) / 14.86	Heat 3: 1 / Jordy Smith / (South Africa) / 15.34; 2 / Filipe Toledo / (Brazil) / 14.40	Heat 4: 1 / Italo Ferreira / (Brazil) / 16.20; 2 / Jérémy Florès / (France) / 15.73

== Semi finals ==
Heat 1: 1 / Michel Bourez / (French Polynesia) / 14.27; 2 / Mikey Wright / (Australia) / 5.67	Heat 2: 1 / Italo Ferreira / (Brazil) / 17.13; 2 / Jordy Smith / (South Africa) / 16.93

== Final ==
Heat 1
1	Italo Ferreira	(Brazil)	18.87
2	Michel Bourez	(French Polynesia)	9.83
