= Rip Curl Pro Bells Beach 2018 =

Surf
- Location: Bells Beach (AUS)
- Dates: 25 March to 8 April 2018
- Competitors: 36 from 9 nations

Medalists
gold medal	Italo Ferreira	Brazil
silver medal	Mick Fanning	Australia

The 2018 Rip Curl Pro Bells Beach was an event on the World Surf League's 2018 Men's Championship Tour. This was held from 25 March to 8 April at Bells Beach, (Victoria, Australia) and contested by 36 surfers.

== Round 1 ==
Heat 1
1	Griffin Colapinto	(United States)	12.53
2	Filipe Toledo	(Brazil)	11.50
3	Michael February	(South Africa)	8.43

Heat 2
1	Owen Wright	(Australia)	11.36
2	Conner Coffin	(United States)	9.10
3	Ezekiel Lau	(Hawaii)	6.17

Heat 3
1	Jordy Smith	(South Africa)	14.30
2	P. Gudauskas	(United States)	14.27
3	Caio Ibelli	(Brazil)	12.16

Heat 4
1	Gabriel Medina	(Brazil)	12.50
2	Italo Ferreira	(Brazil)	11.40
3	Ian Gouveia	(Brazil)	8.23

Heat 5
1	John Florence	(Hawaii)	13.76
2	Tomas Hermes	(Brazil)	10.30
3	Mikey McDonagh	(Australia)	8.34

Heat 6
1	Julian Wilson	(Australia)	11.10
2	Joan Duru	(France)	10.83
3	Carl Wright	(Australia)	7.00

Heat 7
1	Michel Bourez	(French Polynesia)	14.10
2	A. de Souza	(Brazil)	10.97
3	Keanu Asing	(Hawaii)	10.87

Heat 8
1	Matt Wilkinson	(Australia)	11.70
2	Jérémy Florès	(France)	11.00
3	Yago Dora	(Brazil)	10.16

Heat 9
1	Kolohe Andino	(United States)	11.63
2	Willian Cardoso	(Brazil)	11.53
3	Frederico Morais	(Portugal)	10.26

Heat 10
1	Adrian Buchan	(Australia)	12.00
2	Connor O'Leary	(Australia)	8.40
3	M. Rodrigues	(Brazil)	7.53

Heat 11
1	Joel Parkinson	(Australia)	12.33
2	Wade Carmichael	(Australia)	9.90
3	Kanoa Igarashi	(Japan)	8.50

Heat 12
1	Mick Fanning	(Australia)	13.06
2	Jesse Mendes	(Brazil)	11.27
3	Sebastian Zietz	(Hawaii)	10.70

== Round 2 ==
Heat 1: 1 / Filipe Toledo / (Brazil) / 9.50; 2 / Carl Wright / (Australia) / 8.33	Heat 2: 1 / A. de Souza / (Brazil) / 11.57; 2 / Mikey McDonagh / (Australia) / 8.87	Heat 3: 1 / Sebastian Zietz / (Hawaii) / 15.17; 2 / Ian Gouveia / (Brazil) / 9.43	Heat 4: 1 / P. Gudauskas / (United States) / 14.33; 2 / Kanoa Igarashi / (Japan) / 11.03

Heat 5: 1 / Ezekiel Lau / (Hawaii) / 11.43; 2 / Connor O'Leary / (Australia) / 10.00	Heat 6: 1 / Frederico Morais / (Portugal) / 7.73; 2 / Michael February / (South Africa) / 6.33	Heat 7: 1 / Jérémy Florès / (France) / 11.60; 2 / Keanu Asing / (Hawaii) / 9.84	Heat 8: 1 / Conner Coffin / (United States) / 13.74; 2 / Yago Dora / (Brazil) / 13.64

Heat 9: 1 / Willian Cardoso / (Brazil) / 13.36; 2 / Caio Ibelli / (Brazil) / 11.33	Heat 10: 1 / Italo Ferreira / (Brazil) / 13.83; 2 / M. Rodrigues / (Brazil) / 9.73	Heat 11: 1 / Wade Carmichael / (Australia) / 14.00; 2 / Tomas Hermes / (Brazil) / 11.70	Heat 12: 1 / Jesse Mendes / (Brazil) / 14.26; 2 / Joan Duru / (France) / 12.80

== Round 3 ==
Heat 1: 1 / Wade Carmichael / (Australia) / 13.33; 2 / Jordy Smith / (South Africa) / 12.17	Heat 2: 1 / Michel Bourez / (French Polynesia) / 12.84; 2 / Kolohe Andino / (United States) / 9.66	Heat 3: 1 / Owen Wright / (Australia) / 15.14; 2 / Jesse Mendes / (Brazil) / 10.33	Heat 4: 1 / Matt Wilkinson / (Australia) / 13.77; 2 / Griffin Colapinto / (United States) / 12.33

Heat 5: 1 / Mick Fanning / (Australia) / 13.56; 2 / Sebastian Zietz / (Hawaii) / 9.10	Heat 6: 1 / P. Gudauskas / (United States) / 10.73; 2 / Julian Wilson / (Australia) / 9.37	Heat 7: 1 / Ezekiel Lau / (Hawaii) / 13.07; 2 / John Florence / (Hawaii) / 9.76	Heat 8: 1 / Frederico Morais / (Portugal) / 11.60; 2 / Joel Parkinson / (Australia) / 9.07

Heat 9: 1 / Conner Coffin / (United States) / 9.83; 2 / A. de Souza / (Brazil) / 9.63	Heat 10: 1 / Italo Ferreira / (Brazil) / 16.60; 2 / Filipe Toledo / (Brazil) / 15.40	Heat 11: 1 / Jérémy Florès / (France) / 11.86; 2 / Adrian Buchan / (Australia) / 11.73	Heat 12: 1 / Gabriel Medina / (Brazil) / 14.16; 2 / Willian Cardoso / (Brazil) / 13.30

== Round 4 ==
Heat 1
1	Michel Bourez	(French Polynesia)	15.77
2	Owen Wright	(Australia)	12.00
3	Wade Carmichael	(Australia)	10.60

Heat 2
1	Mick Fanning	(Australia)	14.33
2	P. Gudauskas	(United States)	14.00
3	Matt Wilkinson	(Australia)	13.17

Heat 3
1	Ezekiel Lau	(Hawaii)	12.57
2	Frederico Morais	(Portugal)	11.16
3	Conner Coffin	(United States)	11.10

Heat 4
1	Gabriel Medina	(Brazil)	13.33
2	Italo Ferreira	(Brazil)	10.17
3	Jérémy Florès	(France)	11.00

== Quarter finals ==
Heat 1: 1 / P. Gudauskas / (United States) / 11.67; 2 / Michel Bourez / (French Polynesia) / 11.44	Heat 2: 1 / Mick Fanning / (Australia) / 13.77; 2 / Owen Wright / (Australia) / 9.33	Heat 3: 1 / Italo Ferreira / (Brazil) / 17.86; 2 / Ezekiel Lau / (Hawaii) / 11.50	Heat 4: 1 / Gabriel Medina / (Brazil) / 15.73; 2 / Frederico Morais / (Portugal) / 15.00

== Semi finals ==
Heat 1: 1 / Mick Fanning / (Australia) / 16.50; 2 / P. Gudauskas / (United States) / 9.67	Heat 2: 1 / Italo Ferreira / (Brazil) / 16.00; 2 / Gabriel Medina / (Brazil) / 14.10

== Final ==
Heat 1
1	Italo Ferreira	(Brazil)	15.66
2	Mick Fanning	(Australia)	12.83
