= Quiksilver Pro Gold Coast 2018 =

Quiksilver Pro Gold Coast at the Surf
- Location: Gold Coast (AUS)
- Dates: 11 to 22 March
- Competitors: 36 from 11 nations

Medalists
gold medal	Julian Wilson	Australia
silver medal	Adrian Buchan	Australia

The Quiksilver Pro Gold Coast 2018 was an event of the Association of Surfing Professionals for 2018 World Surf League.

This event was held from 11 to 22 March at Gold Coast, (Queensland, Australia) and contested by 36 surfers.

It was won by Julian Wilson.

== Round 1 ==
Heat 1
1	Owen Wright	(Australia)	9.90
2	Caio Ibelli	(Brazil)	5.20
3	Ezekiel Lau	(Hawaii)	4.57

Heat 2
1	Michel Bourez	(French Polynesia)	13.17
2	M. Rodrigues	(Brazil)	11.26
3	Matt Wilkinson	(Australia)	10.67

Heat 3
1	Jordy Smith	(South Africa)	11.66
2	Conner Coffin	(United States)	10.10
3	P. Gudauskas	(United States)	7.64

Heat 4
1	Julian Wilson	(Australia)	12.60
2	Joan Duru	(France)	11.30
3	Ian Gouveia	(Brazil)	7.27

Heat 5
1	Italo Ferreira	(Brazil)	14.26
2	L. Fioravanti	(Italy)	8.44
3	Gabriel Medina	(Brazil)	6.05

Heat 6
1	Griffin Colapinto	(United States)	12.50
2	John Florence	(Hawaii)	7.50
3	Mikey Wright	(Australia)	2.00

Heat 7
1	Kolohe Andino	(United States)	9.63
2	Keanu Asing	(Hawaii)	7.83
3	Kanoa Igarashi	(Japan)	5.60

Heat 8
1	Adrian Buchan	(Australia)	10.30
2	A. de Souza	(Brazil)	8.67
3	Willian Cardoso	(Brazil)	8.07

Heat 9
1	Jérémy Florès	(France)	12.24
2	Joel Parkinson	(Australia)	9.94
3	Yago Dora	(Brazil)	6.86

Heat 10
1	Filipe Toledo	(Brazil)	15.56
2	Frederico Morais	(Portugal)	9.90
3	Tomas Hermes	(Brazil)	5.50

Heat 11
1	Connor O'Leary	(Australia)	13.17
2	Wade Carmichael	(Australia)	7.63
3	Sebastian Zietz	(Hawaii)	7.46

Heat 12
1	Mick Fanning	(Australia)	11.60
2	Jesse Mendes	(Brazil)	9.80
3	Kelly Slater	(United States)	0.00

== Round 2 ==
Heat 1: 1 / Mikey Wright / (Australia) / 15.10; 2 / John Florence / (Hawaii) / 10.76	Heat 2: 1 / Gabriel Medina / (Brazil) / 13.00; 2 / L. Fioravanti / (Italy) / 7.90	Heat 3: 1 / Michael February / (South Africa) / 11.03; 2 / Matt Wilkinson / (Australia) / 8.97	Heat 4: 1 / A. de Souza / (Brazil) / 11.40; 2 / Ian Gouveia / (Brazil) / 10.07

Heat 5: 1 / Joel Parkinson / (Australia) / 17.03; 2 / P. Gudauska / (United States) / 9.67	Heat 6: 1 / M. Rodrigues / (Brazil) / 14.67; 2 / Sebastian Zietz / (Hawaii) / 10.80	Heat 7: 1 / Frederico Morais / (Portugal) / 12.16; 2 / Ezekiel Lau / (Hawaii) / 9.90	Heat 8: 1 / Kanoa Igarashi / (Japan) / 10.60; 2 / Keanu Asing / (Hawaii) / 8.86

Heat 9: 1 / Willian Cardoso / (Brazil) / 12.90; 2 / Caio Ibelli / (Brazil) / 10.83	Heat 10: 1 / Conner Coffin / (United States) / 12.20; 2 / Yago Dora / (Brazil) / 10.60	Heat 11: 1 / Tomas Hermes / (Brazil) / 14.93; 2 / Joan Duru / (France) / 12.17	Heat 12: 1 / Wade Carmichael / (Australia) / 11.74; 2 / Jesse Mendes / (Brazil) / 11.13

== Round 3 ==
Heat 1: 1 / Owen Wright / (Australia) / 14.50; 2 / Willian Cardoso / (Brazil) / 9.04	Heat 2: 1 / Mick Fanning / (Australia) / 11.67; 2 / Conner Coffin / (United States) / 7.37	Heat 3: 1 / Tomas Hermes / (Brazil) / 12.40; 2 / Kolohe Andino / (United States) / 9.60	Heat 4: 1 / Filipe Toledo / (Brazil) / 14.60; 2 / Italo Ferreira / (Brazil) / 13.70

Heat 5: 1 / Adrian Buchan / (Australia) / 13.36; 2 / Jérémy Florès / (France) / 13.10	Heat 6: 1 / Mikey Wright / (Australia) / 16.07; 2 / Gabriel Medina / (Brazil) / 14.90	Heat 7: 1 / Julian Wilson / (Australia) / 7.30; 2 / Michael February / (South Africa) / 7.10	Heat 8: 1 / Kanoa Igarashi / (Japan) / 15.26; 2 / Frederico Morais / (Portugal) / 11.10

Heat 9: 1 / Griffin Colapinto / (United States) / 13.50; 2 / Joel Parkinson / (Australia) / 12.94	Heat 10: 1 / A. de Souza / (Brazil) / 15.07; 2 / Wade Carmichael / (Australia) / 13.60	Heat 11: 1 / Michel Bourez / (French Polynesia) / 12.50; 2 / Connor O'Leary / (Australia) / 6.43	Heat 12: 1 / M. Rodrigues / (Brazil) / 15.00; 2 / Jordy Smith / (South Africa) / 14.00

== Round 4 ==
Heat 1
1	Owen Wright	(Australia)	17.00
2	Tomas Hermes	(Brazil)	11.20
3	Mick Fanning	(Australia)	10.43

Heat 2
1	Filipe Toledo	(Brazil)	15.70
2	Adrian Buchan	(Australia)	14.60
3	Mikey Wright	(Australia)	11.20

Heat 3
1	Julian Wilson	(Australia)	15.97
2	Griffin Colapinto	(United States)	13.83
3	Kanoa Igarashi	(Japan)	11.64

Heat 4
1	Michel Bourez	(French Polynesia)	13.97
2	M. Rodrigues	(Brazil)	13.83
3	A. de Souza	(Brazil)	13.53

== Quarter finals ==
Heat 1: 1 / Adrian Buchan / (Australia) / 13.50; 2 / Owen Wright / (Australia) / 2.50	Heat 2: 1 / Tomas Hermes / (Brazil) / 8.73; 2 / Filipe Toledo / (Brazil) / 7.33	Heat 3: 1 / Julian Wilson / (Australia) / 14.44; 2 / M. Rodrigues / (Brazil) / 10.00	Heat 4: 1 / Griffin Colapinto / (United States) / 16.43; 2 / Michel Bourez / (French Polynesia) / 12.44

== Semi finals ==
Heat 1: 1 / Adrian Buchan / (Australia) / 10.00; 2 / Tomas Hermes / (Brazil) / 9.17	Heat 2: 1 / Julian Wilson / (Australia) / 13.77; 2 / Griffin Colapinto / (United States) / 11.66

== Final ==
Heat 1
1	Julian Wilson	(Australia)	17.43
2	Adrian Buchan	(Australia)	15.10
