= Oi Rio Pro 2018 =

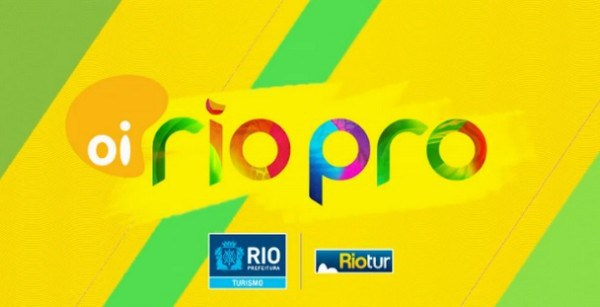
- Location: Saquarema, Rio de Janeiro, Brazil
- Dates: 11–20 May 2018
- Competitors: 36 from 9 nations

Medalists
gold medal	Filipe Toledo	Brazil
silver medal	Wade Carmichael	Australia

The Oi Rio Pro 2018 was an event of the 2018 World Surf League. It was held from May 11-20, 2018 in Saquarema, Rio de Janeiro, Brazil, and included 36 surfers.

== Round 1 ==
Heat 1
1	Filipe Toledo	(Brazil)	13.70
2	Kanoa Igarashi	(Japan)	13.07
3	Ian Gouveia	(Brazil)	9.73

Heat 2
1	Miguel Pupo	(Brazil)	13.10
2	Jordy Smith	(South Africa)	10.66
3	Tomas Hermes	(Brazil)	8.23

Heat 3
1	W. Carmichael	(Australia)	12.60
2	Owen Wright	(Australia)	11.26
3	Wiggolly Dantas	(Brazil)	11.17

Heat 4
1	Mikey Wright	(Australia)	14.83
2	John Florence	(Hawaii)	13.93
3	Joan Duru	(France)	10.93

Heat 5
1	Gabriel Medina	(Brazil)	14.17
2	Jesse Mendes	(Brazil)	13.43
3	Alejo Muniz	(Brazil)	12.86

Heat 6
1	Julian Wilson	(Australia)	12.93
2	Deivid Silva	(Brazil)	10.30
3	P. Gudauskas	(United States)	8.83

Heat 7
1	Italo Ferreira	(Brazil)	10.64
2	Connor O'Leary	(Australia)	10.47
3	Keanu Asing	(Hawaii)	10.36

Heat 8
1	Griffin Colapinto	(United States)	11.60
2	Michael February	(South Africa)	11.47
3	A. de Souza	(Brazil)	11.00

Heat 9
1	Yago Dora	(Brazil)	12.30
2	Michel Bourez	(French Polynesia)	10.67
3	Conner Coffin	(United States)	2.87

Heat 10
1	Ezekiel Lau	(Hawaii)	13.60
2	Adrian Buchan	(Australia)	12.30
3	Sebastian Zietz	(Hawaii)	6.57

Heat 11
1	Willian Cardoso	(Brazil)	11.16
2	Matt Wilkinson	(Australia)	9.60
3	Jérémy Florès	(France)	9.30

Heat 12
1	Kolohe Andino	(United States)	13.40
2	Frederico Morais	(Portugal)	11.76
3	M. Rodrigues	(Brazil)	7.00

== Round 2 ==
Heat 1: 1 / John Florence / (Hawaii) / 12.24; 2 / Deivid Silva / (Brazil) / 10.94	Heat 2: 1 / Alejo Muniz / (Brazil) / 10.57; 2 / Owen Wright / (Australia) / 10.40	Heat 3: 1 / Jordy Smith / (South Africa) / 12.70; 2 / Wiggolly Dantas / (Brazil) / 9.94	Heat 4: 1 / Ian Gouveia / (Brazil) / 15.53; 2 / A. de Souza / (Brazil) / 11.83

Heat 5: 1 / Keanu Asing / (Hawaii) / 9.77; 2 / Michel Bourez / (French Polynesia) / 9.66	Heat 6: 1 / Adrian Buchan / (Australia) / 12.63; 2 / Michael February / (South Africa) / 3.96	Heat 7: 1 / M. Rodrigues / (Brazil) / 8.67; 2 / Matt Wilkinson / (Australia) / 5.80	Heat 8: 1 / Frederico Morais / (Portugal) / 9.04; 2 / P. Gudauskas / (United States) / 6.73

Heat 9: 1 / Jérémy Florès / (France) / 13.66; 2 / Jesse Mendes / (Brazil) / 10.60	Heat 10: 1 / Sebastian Zietz / (Hawaii) / 15.86; 2 / Joan Duru / (France) / 15.67	Heat 11: 1 / Tomas Hermes / (Brazil) / 14.27; 2 / Conner Coffin / (United States) / 5.13	Heat 12: 1 / Kanoa Igarashi / (Japan) / 10.57; 2 / Connor O'Leary / (Australia) / 10.20

== Round 3 ==
Heat 1: 1 / Ian Gouveia / (Brazil) / 14.26; 2 / Jordy Smith / (South Africa) / 10.90	Heat 2: 1 / M. Rodrigues / (Brazil) / 13.70; 2 / Frederico Morais / (Portugal) / 11.07	Heat 3: 1 / Filipe Toledo / (Brazil) / 6.90; 2 / Keanu Asing / (Hawaii) / 6.37	Heat 4: 1 / Kolohe Andino / (United States) / 12.40; 2 / Willian Cardoso / (Brazil) / 2.57

Heat 5: 1 / Kanoa Igarashi / (Japan) / 12.84; 2 / Griffin Colapinto / (United States) / 11.40	Heat 6: 1 / Julian Wilson / (Australia) / 9.34; 2 / Alejo Muniz / (Brazil) / 8.94	Heat 7: 1 / Gabriel Medina / (Brazil) / 13.10; 2 / Mikey Wright / (Australia) / 12.64	Heat 8: 1 / Sebastian Zietz / (Hawaii) / 14.27; 2 / Tomas Hermes / (Brazil) / 9.17

Heat 9: 1 / Ezekiel Lau / (Hawaii) / 8.33; 2 / Adrian Buchan / (Australia) / 7.44	Heat 10: 1 / Yago Dora / (Brazil) / 10.56; 2 / Italo Ferreira / (Brazil) / 9.70	Heat 11: 1 / W. Carmichael / (Australia) / 13.30; 2 / Jérémy Florès / (France) / 12.67	Heat 12: 1 / John Florence / (Hawaii) / 17.97; 2 / Miguel Pupo / (Brazil)

== Round 4 ==
Heat 1
1	Filipe Toledo	(Brazil)	18.33
2	M. Rodrigues	(Brazil)	10.94
3	Ian Gouveia	(Brazil)	8.00

Heat 2
1	Julian Wilson	(Australia)	12.73
2	Kolohe Andino	(United States)	11.90
3	Kanoa Igarashi	(Japan)	9.43

Heat 3
1	Gabriel Medina	(Brazil)	11.84
2	Ezekiel Lau	(Hawaii)	11.84
3	Sebastian Zietz	(Hawaii)	9.00

Heat 4
1	Yago Dora	(Brazil)	13.94
2	W. Carmichael	(Australia)	11.40
3	John Florence	(Hawaii)	8.00

== Quarter finals ==
Heat 1: 1 / Filipe Toledo / (Brazil) / 13.84; 2 / Kolohe Andino / (United States) / 11.93	Heat 2: 1 / Julian Wilson / (Australia) / 12.20; 2 / M. Rodrigues / (Brazil) / 9.83	Heat 3: 1 / W. Carmichael / (Australia) / 11.40; 2 / Gabriel Medina / (Brazil) / 3.63	Heat 4: 1 / Ezekiel Lau / (Hawaii) / 12.86; 2 / Yago Dora / (Brazil) / 8.30

== Semi finals ==
Heat 1: 1 / Filipe Toledo / (Brazil) / 16.37; 2 / Julian Wilson / (Australia) / 5.63	Heat 2: 1 / W. Carmichael / (Australia) / 13.17; 2 / Ezekiel Lau / (Hawaii) / 9.27

== Final ==
Heat 1
1	Filipe Toledo	(Brazil)	17.10
2	W. Carmichael	(Australia)	8.00
