= Billabong Pipeline Masters 2017 =

Billabong Pipeline Masters 2017 at the Surf
- Location: Banzai Pipeline (HAW)
- Dates: 8 to 20 December
- Competitors: 36 from 9 nations

Medalists
gold medal	Jérémy Florès	France
silver medal	John John Florence	Hawaii

The Billabong Pipe Masters, is an annual event of the Association of Surfing Professionals for 2017 World Surf League, it is the final event of the Triple Crown of Surfing.

This event was held from 8 to 20 December at Banzai Pipeline, Oahu (Hawaii, United States) and consisted of the world's best surfers competing for Champion of the renowned Banzai pipeline. Competing in the 2017 were Brazilians, Gabriel Medina, Filipe Toledo, Americans, Kelly Slater and John John Florence and Australian, Mick Fanning among many others. On 18 December 2017 John John Florence, the reigning World Champion and number 1 in the World, walked away as World Surf League World Champion, stating "To win at home is my dream".

== Round 1 ==
Heat 1
1	Jérémy Florès	(France)	10.17
2	Jadson André	(Brazil)	6.63
3	Matt Wilkinson	(Australia)	4.67

Heat 2
1	Josh Kerr	(Australia)	12.17
2	Kanoa Igarashi	(United States)	6.10
3	Owen Wright	(Australia)	3.37

Heat 3
1	Conner Coffin	(United States)	10.56
2	Julian Wilson	(Australia)	8.00
3	Stuart Kennedy	(Australia)	6.50

Heat 4
1	Jordy Smith	(South Africa)	16.57
2	Bebe Durbidge	(Australia)	11.43
3	Ethan Ewing	(Australia)	3.00

Heat 5
1	Miguel Pupo	(Brazil)	14.83
2	Benji Brand	(Hawaii)	12.64
3	Gabriel Medina	(Brazil)	12.43

Heat 6
1	John Florence	(Hawaii)	13.50
2	Dusty Payne	(Hawaii)	6.83
3	Wiggolly Dantas	(Brazil)	5.63

Heat 7
1	Caio Ibelli	(Brazil)	12.83
2	A. de Souza	(Brazil)	11.27
3	Jack Freestone	(Australia)	7.04

Heat 8
1	Kelly Slater	(United States)	12.47
2	Joan Duru	(France)	11.90
3	Kolohe Andino	(United States)	7.60

Heat 9
1	Ezekiel Lau	(Hawaii)	10.50
2	Filipe Toledo	(Brazil)	2.00
3	Michel Bourez	(French Polynesia)	2.00

Heat 10
1	Adrian Buchan	(Australia)	10.83
2	Sebastian Zietz	(Hawaii)	10.60
3	Ian Gouveia	(Brazil)	8.43

Heat 11
1	Jordy Smith	(South Africa)	12.04
2	Joel Parkinson	(Australia)	11.13
3	L. Fioravanti	(Italy)	8.44

Heat 12
1	Italo Ferreira	(Brazil)	12.90
2	Mick Fanning	(Australia)	10.80
3	Frederico Morais	(Portugal)	9.27

== Round 2 ==
Heat 1: 1 / Gabriel Medina / (Brazil) / 15.33; 2 / Dusty Payne / (Hawaii) / 8.50	Heat 2: 1 / Ethan Ewing / (Australia) / 11.54; 2 / Owen Wright / (Australia) / 10.77	Heat 3: 1 / Julian Wilson / (Australia) / 8.56; 2 / Benji Brand / (Hawaii) / 6.87	Heat 4: 1 / Matt Wilkinson / (Australia) / 0.00; 2 / Stuart Kennedy / (Australia) / INJ

Heat 5: 1 / A. de Souza / (Brazil) / 11.93; 2 / Jadson André / (Brazil) / 8.33	Heat 6: 1 / Kolohe Andino / (United States) / 17.10; 2 / Jack Freestone / (Australia) / 14.96	Heat 7: 1 / Ian Gouveia / (Brazil) / 13.40; 2 / Filipe Toledo / (Brazil) / 11.30	Heat 8: 1 / L. Fioravanti / (Italy) / 13.17; 2 / Sebastian Zietz / (Hawaii) / 10.00

Heat 9: 1 / Joel Parkinson / (Australia) / 6.10; 2 / Wiggolly Dantas / (Brazil) / 5.13	Heat 10: 1 / Mick Fanning / (Australia) / 8.90; 2 / Bebe Durbidge / (Australia) / 8.87	Heat 11: 1 / Kanoa Igarashi / (United States) / 12.67; 2 / Frederico Morais / (Portugal) / 6.00	Heat 12: 1 / Michel Bourez / (French Polynesia) / 16.40; 2 / Joan Duru / (France) / 6.54

== Round 3 ==
Heat 1: 1 / Julian Wilson / (Australia) / 15.26; 2 / Ezekiel Lau / (Hawaii) / 8.34	Heat 2: 1 / Conner Coffin / (United States) / 14.03; 2 / Mick Fanning / (Australia) / 12.60	Heat 3: 1 / Ian Gouveia / (Brazil) / 8.60; 2 / Matt Wilkinson / (Australia) / 6.83	Heat 4: 1 / Joel Parkinson / (Australia) / 8.50; 2 / Miguel Pupo / (Brazil) / 5.47

Heat 5: 1 / Caio Ibelli / (Brazil) / 10.13; 2 / Michel Bourez / (French Polynesia) / 6.57	Heat 6: 1 / John Florence / (Hawaii) / 10.87; 2 / Ethan Ewing / (Australia) / 10.80	Heat 7: 1 / Jérémy Florès / (France) / 6.60; 2 / Adrian Buchan / (Australia) / 2.26	Heat 8: 1 / Gabriel Medina / (Brazil) / 10.00; 2 / Josh Kerr / (Australia) / 9.83

Heat 9: 1 / Italo Ferreira / (Brazil) / 10.26; 2 / Kolohe Andino / (United States) / 4.17	Heat 10: 1 / L. Fioravanti / (Italy) / 15.87; 2 / A. de Souza / (Brazil) / 6.63	Heat 11: 1 / Kanoa Igarashi / (United States) / 13.34; 2 / Jordy Smith / (South Africa) / 9.73	Heat 12: 1 / Kelly Slater / (United States) / 11.87; 2 / Jordy Smith / (South Africa) / 7.87

== Round 4 ==
Heat 1
1	Ian Gouveia	(Brazil)	11.73
2	Conner Coffin	(United States)	1.23
3	Julian Wilson	(Australia)	0.43

Heat 2
1	John Florence	(Hawaii)	13.17
2	Caio Ibelli	(Brazil)	12.87
3	Joel Parkinson	(Australia)	4.53

Heat 3
1	Jérémy Florès	(France)	15.37
2	Gabriel Medina	(Brazil)	12.10
3	Italo Ferreira	(Brazil)	7.57

Heat 4
1	Kanoa Igarashi	(United States)	12.44
2	L. Fioravanti	(Italy)	4.60
3	Kelly Slater	(United States)	4.44

== Round 5 ==
Heat 1: 1 / Joel Parkinson / (Australia) / 15.23; 2 / Conner Coffin / (United States) / 9.43	Heat 2: 1 / Julian Wilson / (Australia) / 12.50; 2 / Caio Ibelli / (Brazil) / 7.90	Heat 3: 1 / Gabriel Medina / (Brazil) / 17.97; 2 / Kelly Slater / (United States) / 9.16	Heat 4: 1 / Italo Ferreira / (Brazil) / 6.34; 2 / L. Fioravanti / (Italy) / 0.90

== Quarter finals ==
Heat 1: 1 / Ian Gouveia / (Brazil) / 9.70; 2 / Joel Parkinson / (Australia) / 8.40	Heat 2: 1 / John Florence / (Hawaii) / 17.60; 2 / Julian Wilson / (Australia) / 2.64	Heat 3: 1 / Jérémy Florès / (France) / 12.76; 2 / Gabriel Medina / (Brazil) / 6.04	Heat 4: 1 / Kanoa Igarashi / (United States) / 9.57; 2 / Italo Ferreira / (Brazil) / 8.67

== Semi finals ==
Heat 1: 1 / John Florence / (Hawaii) / 12.56; 2 / Ian Gouveia / (Brazil) / 12.33	Heat 2: 1 / Jérémy Florès / (France) / 12.20; 2 / Kanoa Igarashi / (United States) / 11.33

== Final ==
Heat 1
1	Jérémy Florès	(France)	16.23
2	John Florence	(Hawaii)	16.16
