= Uluwatu CT 2018 =

- Location: Uluwatu, Bali, Bali, Indonesia
- Dates: 11–20 May 2018
- Competitors: 36 from 9 nations

Medalists
| gold medal | Willian Cardoso | Brazil |
| silver medal | Julian Wilson | Australia |

The Uluwatu CT 2018 was an event of the 2018 World Surf League. It was held from 11 to 20 May at Uluwatu, Bali, Indonesia, and contested by 36 surfers.

== Round 1 ==
Heat 1
| 1 | Keanu Asing | (Hawaii) | 10.70 |
| 2 | Matt Wilkinson | (Australia) | 5.33 |
| 3 | Connor O'Leary | (Australia) | 4.64 |

Heat 2
| 1 | Jordy Smith | (South Africa) | 12.17 |
| 2 | Ian Gouveia | (Brazil) | 10.67 |
| 3 | Tomas Hermes | (Brazil) | 2.54 |

Heat 3
| 1 | Jack Robinson | (Australia) | 13.94 |
| 2 | Owen Wright | (Australia) | 4.03 |
| 3 | Miguel Pupo | (Brazil) | 2.40 |

Heat 4
| 1 | John Florence | (Hawaii) | 14.60 |
| 2 | Mikey Wright | (Australia) | 11.87 |
| 3 | W. Carmichael | (Australia) | 8.50 |

Heat 5
| 1 | Gabriel Medina | (Brazil) | 10.16 |
| 2 | Kael Walsh | (Australia) | 8.96 |
| 3 | Joan Duru | (France) | 1.97 |

Heat 6
| 1 | Julian Wilson | (Australia) | 10.56 |
| 2 | Jesse Mendes | (Brazil) | 10.00 |
| 3 | D. Delroy-Carr | (Australia) | 3.40 |

Heat 7
| 1 | Filipe Toledo | (Brazil) | 6.14 |
| 2 | Conner Coffin | (United States) | 5.87 |
| 3 | Michael February | (South Africa) | 2.57 |

Heat 8
| 1 | A. de Souza | (Brazil) | 5.00 |
| 2 | Kanoa Igarashi | (Japan) | 3.74 |
| 3 | Yago Dora | (Brazil) | 1.60 |

Heat 9
| 1 | Willian Cardoso | (Brazil) | 7.53 |
| 2 | Adrian Buchan | (Australia) | 5.93 |
| 3 | Griffin Colapinto | (United States) | 3.83 |

Heat 10
| 1 | Sebastian Zietz | (Hawaii) | 5.40 |
| 2 | Italo Ferreira | (Brazil) | 10.90 |
| 3 | M. Rodrigues | (Brazil) | 2.23 |

Heat 11
| 1 | Kolohe Andino | (United States) | 8.20 |
| 2 | Ezekiel Lau | (Hawaii) | 6.54 |
| 3 | Frederico Morais | (Portugal) | 5.93 |

Heat 12
| 1 | Joel Parkinson | (Australia) | 10.34 |
| 2 | Michel Bourez | (French Polynesia) | 2.24 |
| 3 | P. Gudauskas | (United States) | 1.30 |

== Round 2 ==
| Heat 1: 1 / Owen Wright / (Australia) / 9.77; 2 / D. Delroy-Carr / (Australia) / 5.53 | Heat 2: 1 / Kael Walsh / (Australia) / 9.77; 2 / Matt Wilkinson / (Australia) / 5.07 | Heat 3: 1 / Mikey Wright / (Australia) / 14.17; 2 / Adrian Buchan / (Australia) / 9.14 | Heat 4: 1 / Italo Ferreira / (Brazil) / 13.67; 2 / Miguel Pupo / (Brazil) / 13.16 |

| Heat 5: 1 / Michel Bourez / (French Polynesia) / 14.16; 2 / Ian Gouveia / (Brazil) / 9.10 | Heat 6: 1 / Michael February / (South Africa) / 12.73; 2 / Frederico Morais / (Portugal) / 9.17 | Heat 7: 1 / Yago Dora / (Brazil) / 13.76; 2 / Griffin Colapinto / (United States) / 11.93 | Heat 8: 1 / M. Rodrigues / (Brazil) / 14.34; 2 / Kanoa Igarashi / (Japan) / 13.27 |

| Heat 9: 1 / Conner Coffin / (United States) / 11.83; 2 / Ezekiel Lau / (Hawaii) / 9.57 | Heat 10: 1 / Connor O'Leary / (Australia) / 13.50; 2 / P. Gudauskas / (United States) / 12.50 | Heat 11: 1 / Jesse Mendes / (Brazil) / 9.37; 2 / Tomas Hermes / (Brazil) / 9.10 | Heat 12: 1 / Joan Duru / (France) / 14.57; 2 / W. Carmichael / (Australia) / 11.80 |

== Round 3 ==
| Heat 1: 1 / Owen Wright / (Australia) / 13.43; 2 / Keanu Asing / (Hawaii) / 10.43 | Heat 2: 1 / Kolohe Andino / (United States) / 14.47; 2 / Jesse Mendes / (Brazil) / 14.33 | Heat 3: 1 / Jordy Smith / (South Africa) / 15.33; 2 / Michael February / (South Africa) / 7.26 | Heat 4: 1 / M. Rodrigues / (Brazil) / 14.77; 2 / Italo Ferreira / (Brazil) / 12.93 |

| Heat 5: 1 / Conner Coffin / (United States) / 14.07; 2 / Sebastian Zietz / (Hawaii) / 9.16 | Heat 6: 1 / Julian Wilson / (Australia) / 8.34; 2 / Kael Walsh / (Australia) / 7.27 | Heat 7: 1 / Gabriel Medina / (Brazil) / 10.50; 2 / Jack Robinson / (Australia) / 4.20 | Heat 8: 1 / Connor O'Leary / (Australia) / 11.06; 2 / Michel Bourez / (French Polynesia) / 9.04 |

| Heat 9: 1 / Willian Cardoso / (Brazil) / 13.00; 2 / A. de Souza / (Brazil) / 12.37 | Heat 10: 1 / Filipe Toledo / (Brazil) / 12.54; 2 / Yago Dora / (Brazil) / 11.83 | Heat 11: 1 / Joan Duru / (France) / 12.67; 2 / Joel Parkinson / (Australia) / 11.70 | Heat 12: 1 / Mikey Wright / (Australia); 2 / John Florence / (Hawaii) / W.O. |

== Round 4 ==
Heat 1
| 1 | Kolohe Andino | (United States) | 9.34 |
| 2 | Jordy Smith | (South Africa) | 9.10 |
| 3 | Owen Wright | (Australia) | 8.47 |

Heat 2
| 1 | Julian Wilson | (Australia) | 14.13 |
| 2 | Conner Coffin | (United States) | 13.04 |
| 3 | M. Rodrigues | (Brazil) | 11.50 |

Heat 3
| 1 | Gabriel Medina | (Brazil) | 17.07 |
| 2 | Willian Cardoso | (Brazil) | 14.66 |
| 3 | Connor O'Leary | (Australia) | 14.63 |

Heat 4
| 1 | Filipe Toledo | (Brazil) | 10.50 |
| 2 | Mikey Wright | (Australia) | 8.83 |
| 3 | Joan Duru | (France) | 14.63 |

== Quarter finals ==
| Heat 1: 1 / Kolohe Andino / (United States) / 14.53; 2 / Conner Coffin / (United States) / 11.83 | Heat 2: 1 / Julian Wilson / (Australia) / 16.20; 2 / Jordy Smith / (South Africa) / 15.50 | Heat 3: 1 / Mikey Wright / (Australia) / 11.13; 2 / Gabriel Medina / (Brazil) / 10.90 | Heat 4: 1 / Willian Cardoso / (Brazil) / 14.24; 2 / Filipe Toledo / (Brazil) / 11.67 |

== Semi finals ==
| Heat 1: 1 / Julian Wilson / (Australia) / 15.83; 2 / Kolohe Andino / (United States) / 14.53 | Heat 2: 1 / Willian Cardoso / (Brazil) / 13.77; 2 / Mikey Wright / (Australia) / 13.16 |

== Final ==
Heat 1
| 1 | Willian Cardoso | (Brazil) | 15.57 |
| 2 | Julian Wilson | (Australia) | 14.43 |
