= MEO Rip Curl Pro Portugal 2018 =

2018 surfing competition

MEO Rip Curl Pro Portugal 2018 at the Surf
- Location: Supertubos beach, Peniche (POR)
- Dates: 16 to 27 October
- Competitors: 36 from 9 nations

Medalists
gold medal	Italo Ferreira	Brazil
silver medal	Joan Duru	France

The MEO Rip Curl Pro Portugal 2018 was an event in the 2018 World Surf League Men's Championship Tour.

== Background ==
The 10th edition of the event was hosted in Peniche, Portugal from 16 to 27 October at the Supertubos beach in Peniche, (Leiria, Portugal). Italo Ferreira, who represents Brazil, is the current champion.

Brazilian football player, Neymar Jr., was one of the notable attendees of the event. He had flown from Paris to support his fellow countryman and defending Men's Championship Tour leader, Gabriel Medina. In an interview with the WSL, Medina said, "He's a really good friend. It's good to have that kind of support. He's an inspiration for me."

Italo Ferreira was crowned the champion, defeating Frenchman Joan Duru, who was competing in his first ever Championship Tour final. Ferreira's win also eliminated previous champion Gabriel Medina from the Championship Tour.

== Results ==
=== Round 1 ===
Heat 1
1	Ryan Callinan	(Australia)	9.53
2	Ezekiel Lau	(Hawaii)	9.00
3	Owen Wright	(Australia)	6.50

Heat 2
1	Jordy Smith	(South Africa)	9.73
2	Yago Dora	(Brazil)	5.57
3	Keanu Asing	(Hawaii)	4.54

Heat 3
1	Italo Ferreira	(Brazil)	10.94
2	Frederico Morais	(Portugal)	6.20
3	Wiggolly Dantas	(Brazil)	4.43

Heat 4
1	Julian Wilson	(Australia)	14.50
2	Connor O'Leary	(Australia)	12.00
3	Vasco Ribeiro	(Portugal)	9.47

Heat 5
1	Tomas Hermes	(Brazil)	10.50
2	Filipe Toledo	(Brazil)	9.56
3	Miguel Blanco	(Portugal)	4.17

Heat 6
1	Gabriel Medina	(Brazil)	13.17
2	Samuel Pupo	(Brazil)	6.03
3	Patrick Gudauskas	(United States)	4.77

Heat 7
1	Adrian Buchan	(Australia)	9.10
2	Miguel Pupo	(Brazil)	8.30
3	Wade Carmichael	(Australia)	5.80

Heat 8
1	Conner Coffin	(United States)	12.16
2	Griffin Colapinto	(United States)	10.17
3	Joan Duru	(France)	3.17

Heat 9
1	Ian Gouveia	(Brazil)	11.50
2	Kolohe Andino	(United States)	5.76
3	Jérémy Florès	(France)	1.80

Heat 10
1	Jesse Mendes	(Brazil)	8.83
2	Willian Cardoso	(Brazil)	7.03
3	Sebastian Zietz	(Hawaii)	2.54

Heat 11
1	Kanoa Igarashi	(Japan)	14.77
2	Matt Wilkinson	(Australia)	6.77
3	Adriano de Souza	(Brazil)	6.17

Heat 12
1	Michel Bourez	(French Polynesia)	10.47
2	Michael February	(South Africa)	6.73
3	Michael Rodrigues	(Brazil)	1.67

=== Round 2 ===
Heat 1: 1 / Filipe Toledo / (Brazil) / 12.67; 2 / Samuel Pupo / (Brazil) / 5.03	Heat 2: 1 / Owen Wright / (Australia) / 9.33; 2 / Miguel Blanco / (Portugal) / 7.73	Heat 3: 1 / Wade Carmichael / (Australia) / 8.03; 2 / Vasco Ribeiro / (Portugal) / 7.90	Heat 4: 1 / Kolohe Andino / (United States) / 12.33; 2 / Wiggolly Dantas / (Brazil) / 9.73

Heat 5: 1 / Willian Cardoso / (Brazil) / 14.50; 2 / Keanu Asing / (Hawaii) / 9.67	Heat 6: 1 / Michael Rodrigues / (Brazil) / 13.00; 2 / Miguel Pupo / (Brazil) / 10.10	Heat 7: 1 / Joan Duru / (France) / 12.83; 2 / Adriano de Souza / (Brazil) / 4.50	Heat 8: 1 / Matt Wilkinson / (Australia) / 11.33; 2 / Sebastian Zietz / (Hawaii) / 10.83

Heat 9: 1 / Jérémy Florès / (France) / 12.50; 2 / Michael February / (South Africa) / 9.84	Heat 10: 1 / Patrick Gudauskas / (United States) / 11.10; 2 / Griffin Colapinto / (United States) / 10.66	Heat 11: 1 / Ezekiel Lau / (Hawaii) / 13.26; 2 / Connor O'Leary / (Australia) / 8.36	Heat 12: 1 / Frederico Morais / (Portugal) / 11.44; 2 / Yago Dora / (Brazil) / 9.16

=== Round 3 ===
Heat 1: 1 / Italo Ferreira / (Brazil) / 13.66; 2 / Jesse Mendes / (Brazil) / 13.30	Heat 2: 1 / Ezekiel Lau / (Hawaii) / 13.40; 2 / Kolohe Andino / (United States) / 13.40	Heat 3: 1 / Matt Wilkinson / (Australia) / 12.83; 2 / Jordy Smith / (South Africa) / 12.77	Heat 4: 1 / Frederico Morais / (Portugal) / 11.33; 2 / Conner Coffin / (United States) / 10.40

Heat 5: 1 / Michel Bourez / (French Polynesia) / 12.33; 2 / Michael Rodrigues / (Brazil) / 11.14	Heat 6: 1 / Gabriel Medina / (Brazil) / 13.60; 2 / Ryan Callinan / (Australia) / 7.33	Heat 7: 1 / Joan Duru / (France) / 12.50; 2 / Filipe Toledo / (Brazil) / 12.10	Heat 8: 1 / Kanoa Igarashi / (Japan) / 13.60; 2 / Jérémy Florès / (France) / 9.77

Heat 9: 1 / Wade Carmichael / (Australia) / 10.17; 2 / Tomas Hermes / (Brazil) / 5.30	Heat 10: 1 / Owen Wright / (Australia) / 15.27; 2 / Patrick Gudauskas / (United States) / 6.97	Heat 11: 2 / Adrian Buchan / (Australia) / 9.66; 1 / Willian Cardoso / (Brazil) / 7.03	Heat 12: 1 / Julian Wilson / (Australia) / 13.90; 2 / Ian Gouveia / (Brazil) / 7.17

=== Round 4 ===
Heat 1
1	Italo Ferreira	(Brazil)	14.60
2	Matt Wilkinson	(Australia)	13.30
3	Ezekiel Lau	(Hawaii)	6.00

Heat 2
1	Gabriel Medina	(Brazil)	11.67
2	Michel Bourez	(French Polynesia)	7.84
3	Frederico Morais	(Portugal)	3.63

Heat 3
1	Joan Duru	(France)	11.50
2	Kanoa Igarashi	(Japan)	9.10
3	Wade Carmichael	(Australia)	7.93

Heat 4
1	Owen Wright	(Australia)	12.16
2	Julian Wilson	(Australia)	12.10
3	Adrian Buchan	(Australia)	11.13

=== Quarter finals ===
Heat 1: 1 / Italo Ferreira / (Brazil) / 16.10; 2 / Michel Bourez / (French Polynesia) / 5.20	Heat 2: 1 / Gabriel Medina / (Brazil) / 16.16; 2 / Matt Wilkinson / (Australia) / 11.03	Heat 3: 1 / Joan Duru / (France) / 11.57; 2 / Julian Wilson / (Australia) / 5.10	Heat 4: 1 / Owen Wright / (Australia) / 11.17; 2 / Kanoa Igarashi / (Japan) / 4.60

=== Semi finals ===
Heat 1: 1 / Italo Ferreira / (Brazil) / 16.47; 2 / Gabriel Medina / (Brazil) / 14.73	Heat 2: 2 / Joan Duru / (France) / 13.60; 1 / Owen Wright / (Australia) / 12.00

=== Final ===
Heat 1
1	Italo Ferreira	(Brazil)	15.93
2	Joan Duru	(France)	10.77
