= 2018 World Surf League =

Professional surfing league season

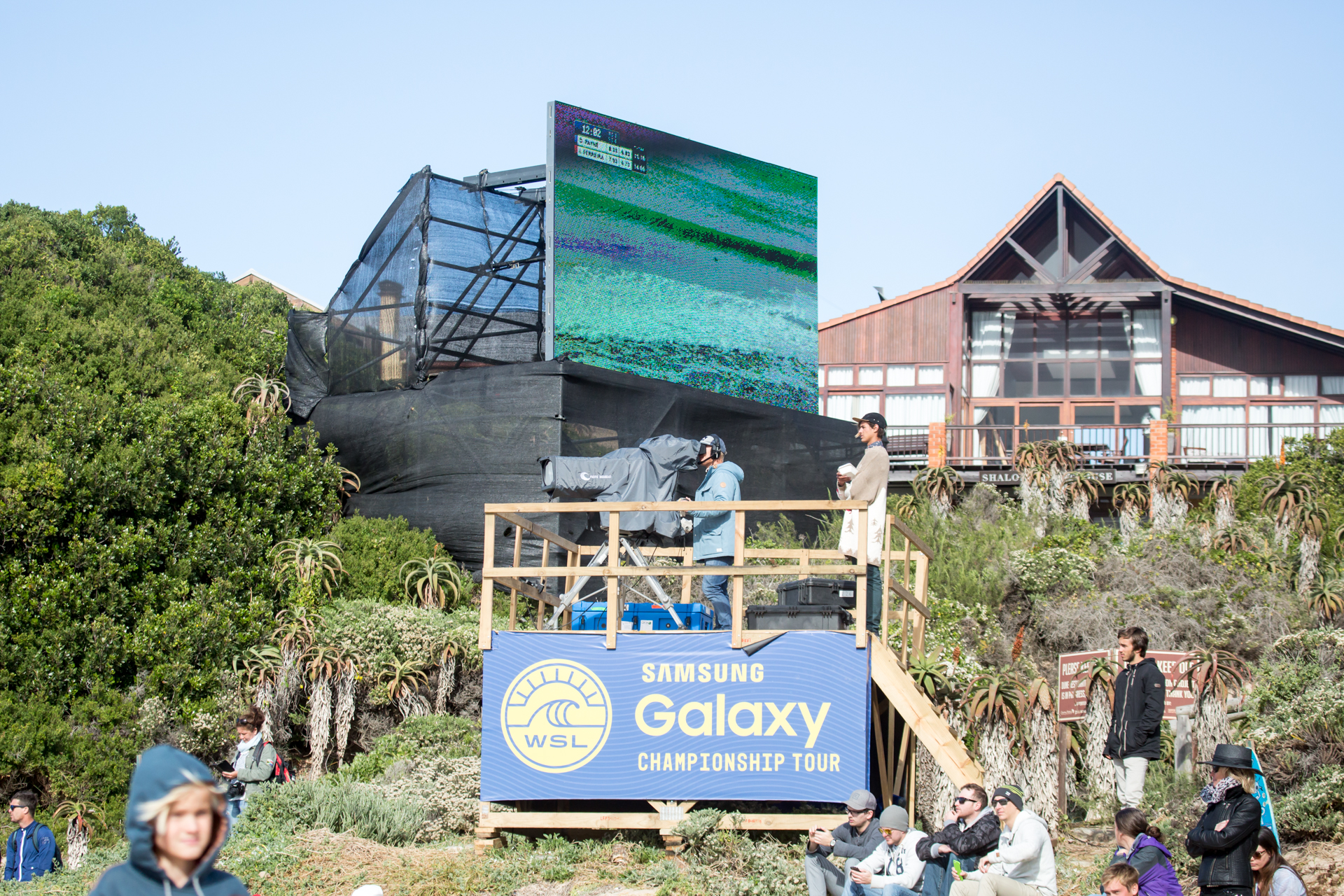
- Location: International
- Dates: March 11th 2018 – December 20th 2018

Champions
- Men: (Brazil) Gabriel Medina
- Women: (Australia) Stephanie Gilmore

The 2018 World Surf League Championship Tour (CT) is a professional competitive surfing league run by the World Surf League, starting on 11 March 2018. Men and women compete in separate tours with events taking place from late March to mid-December, at various surfing locations around the world.

Surfers receive points for their best events. The surfer with the most points at the end of the tour (after discarding their two worst results) is announced the 2018 World Surf League Champion. Gabriel Medina won his second world title while Stephanie Gilmore won her record-tying seventh world title.

== 2018 Men's Championship Tour ==
=== Event results ===
Round	Event	Men's champion	Men's runner-up
1	(Australia) Quiksilver Pro Gold Coast	(Australia) Julian Wilson	(Australia) Adrian Buchan
2	(Australia) Rip Curl Pro Bells Beach	(Brazil) Ítalo Ferreira	(Australia) Mick Fanning
3	(Brazil) Oi Rio Pro	(Brazil) Filipe Toledo	(Australia) Wade Carmichael
4	(Indonesia) Corona Bali Protected	(Brazil) Ítalo Ferreira	(French Polynesia) Michel Bourez
5	(Indonesia) Uluwatu CT	(Brazil) Willian Cardoso	(Australia) Julian Wilson
6	(South Africa) Corona Open J-Bay	(Brazil) Filipe Toledo	(Australia) Wade Carmichael
7	(French Polynesia) Tahiti Pro Teahupo'o	(Brazil) Gabriel Medina	(Australia) Owen Wright
8	(United States) Surf Ranch Pro	(Brazil) Gabriel Medina	(Brazil) Filipe Toledo
9	Quiksilver Pro France	(Australia) Julian Wilson	(Australia) Ryan Callinan
10	MEO Rip Curl Pro Portugal	(Brazil) Ítalo Ferreira	(France) Joan Duru
11	(Hawaii) Billabong Pipe Masters	(Brazil) Gabriel Medina	(Australia) Julian Wilson

=== 2018 Men's Championship Tour Jeep Leaderboard ===
Points are awarded using the following structure:

Position	1st	2nd	3rd	5th	9th	13th	25th	INJ	DNC
Points	10.000	7.800	6.085	4.745	3.700	1.665	420	420	0

Ranking	+/-	Surfer	(Australia) WCT 1 (Details)	(Australia) WCT 2 (Details)	(Brazil) WCT 3 (Details)	(Indonesia) WCT 4 (Details)	(Indonesia) WCT 5 (Details)	(South Africa) WCT 6 (Details)	(French Polynesia) WCT 7 (Details)	(United States) WCT 8 (Details)	(France) WCT 9 (Details)	(Portugal) WCT 10 (Details)	(Hawaii) WCT 11 (Details)	Points
1	Steady	Gabriel Medina (BRA)	13th	3rd	5th	9th	5th	5th	1st	1st	3rd	3rd	1st	62.490
2	Steady	Julian Wilson (AUS)	1st	13th	3rd	13th	2nd	5th	25th	5th	1st	5th	2nd	57.585
3	Steady	Filipe Toledo (BRA)	5th	13th	1st	5th	5th	1st	3rd	2nd	13th	13th	13th	51.450
4	Steady	Italo Ferreira (BRA)	13th	1st	13th	1st	13th	25th	5th	13th	13th	1st	13th	43.070
5	Steady	Jordy Smith (ZAF)	13th	13th	13th	3rd	5th	3rd	13th	9th	5th	13th	3rd	36.440
6	Steady	Owen Wright (AUS)	5th	5th	25th	13th	9th	13th	2nd	5th	25th	3rd	25th	35.570
7	Steady	Conner Coffin (USA)	13th	9th	25th	13th	5th	5th	25th	9th	3rd	13th	5th	32.715
8	Steady	Michel Bourez (PYF)	5th	5th	25th	2nd	13th	13th	13th	13th	25th	5th	9th	32.395
9	Steady	Wade Carmichael (AUS)	13th	9th	2nd	25th	25th	2nd	5th	25th	25th	9th	13th	31.915
10	Steady	Kanoa Igarashi (JPN)	9th	25th	9th	25th	25th	3rd	9th	3rd	25th	5th	13th	30.520
11	Steady	Kolohe Andino (USA)	13th	13th	5th	25th	3rd	13th	5th	9th	13th	13th	25th	27.600
12	Steady	Mikey Wright (AUS)	9th	–	13th	3rd	3rd	13th	13th	13th	5th	–	–	27.275
13	Steady	Willian Cardoso (BRA)	13th	13th	13th	5th	1st	13th	25th	25th	9th	13th	25th	27.190
14	Steady	Sebastian Zietz (HAW)	25th	13th	9th	25th	13th	5th	25th	5th	5th	25th	5th	26.850
15	Steady	Michael Rodrigues (BRA)	5th	25th	5th	13th	9th	13th	13th	13th	9th	13th	13th	25.215
16	Steady	Jérémy Florès (FRA)	13th	9th	13th	5th	INJ	13th	3rd	13th	25th	13th	13th	24.520
17	Steady	Adrian Buchan (AUS)	2nd	13th	13th	9th	25th	13th	13th	25th	13th	9th	25th	23.945
18	Steady	Griffin Colapinto (USA)	3rd	13th	13th	5th	25th	9th	25th	13th	13th	25th	13th	23.275
19	Steady	Adriano de Souza (BRA)	9th	13th	25th	9th	13th	9th	13th	13th	5th	25th	INJ	22.925
20	Steady	Ezekiel Lau (HAW)	25th	5th	3rd	13th	25th	25th	9th	25th	13th	9th	25th	22.820
21	Steady	Yago Dora (BRA)	25th	25th	5th	25th	13th	13th	9th	9th	13th	25th	5th	22.725
22	Steady	Joan Duru (FRA)	25th	25th	25th	25th	9th	25th	25th	13th	13th	2nd	5th	21.255
23	Steady	Frederico Morais (PRT)	13th	5th	13th	13th	25th	9th	13th	25th	25th	9th	25th	19.645
24	Steady	Joel Parkinson (AUS)	13th	13th	DNC	13th	13th	9th	13th	25th	13th	INJ	9th	17.810
25	Steady	Matt Wilkinson (AUS)	25th	9th	25th	13th	25th	25th	25th	25th	9th	5th	13th	17.155
26	Steady	Connor O'Leary (AUS)	13th	25th	25th	25th	9th	13th	9th	13th	13th	25th	13th	16.565
27	Steady	Tomas Hermes (BRA)	3rd	25th	13th	13th	25th	13th	25th	13th	25th	13th	25th	15.670
28	Steady	Jesse Mendes (BRA)	25th	13th	25th	9th	13th	25th	13th	25th	25th	13th	9th	15.320
29	Steady	Patrick Gudauskas (USA)	25th	3rd	25th	25th	25th	25th	25th	13th	9th	13th	25th	15.215
30	Steady	Kelly Slater (USA)	INJ	INJ	INJ	INJ	INJ	25th	INJ	3rd	INJ	INJ	3rd	15.110
31	Steady	Ryan Callinan (AUS)	–	–	–	–	–	–	–	–	2nd	13th	9th	13.165
32	Steady	Michael February (ZAF)	13th	25th	25th	13th	13th	25th	5th	25th	25th	25th	13th	13.085
33	Steady	Ian Gouveia (BRA)	25th	25th	9th	25th	25th	25th	13th	13th	13th	13th	25th	12.040
34	Steady	Mick Fanning (AUS)	9th	2nd	DNC	DNC	DNC	DNC	DNC	DNC	DNC	DNC	DNC	11.500
35	Steady	John John Florence (HAW)	25th	13th	9th	13th	13th	INJ	INJ	INJ	INJ	INJ	INJ	10.795
36	Steady	Miguel Pupo (BRA)	–	–	13th	25th	25th	25th	25th	5th	25th	25th	13th	10.595
37	Steady	Keanu Asing (HAW)	25th	25th	13th	13th	13th	25th	25th	25th	25th	25th	25th	7.515
38	Steady	Wiggolly Dantas (BRA)	–	–	25th	–	–	13th	13th	25th	13th	25th	–	6.255
39	Steady	Caio Ibelli (BRA)	25th	25th	INJ	INJ	INJ	INJ	INJ	INJ	INJ	INJ	25th	3.780
40	Steady	Jack Robinson (AUS)	–	–	–	–	13th	–	–	–	–	–	–	1.665
40	Steady	Kael Walsh (AUS)	–	–	–	–	13th	–	–	–	–	–	–	1.665
40	Steady	Alejo Muniz (BRA)	–	–	13th	–	–	–	–	–	–	–	–	1.665
40	Steady	Tikanui Smith (PYF)	–	–	–	–	–	–	13th	–	–	–	–	1.665
40	Steady	Seth Moniz (HAW)	–	–	–	–	–	–	–	–	–	–	13th	1.665
45	Steady	Leonardo Fioravanti (ITA)	25th	–	–	–	–	–	–	–	–	–	–	420
45	Steady	Carl Wright (AUS)	–	25th	–	–	–	–	–	–	–	–	–	420
45	Steady	Mikey McDonagh (AUS)	–	25th	–	–	–	–	–	–	–	–	–	420
45	Steady	David Delroy-Carr (AUS)	–	–	–	–	25th	–	–	–	–	–	–	420
45	Steady	Deivid Silva (BRA)	–	–	25th	–	–	–	–	–	–	–	–	420
45	Steady	Barron Mamiya (HAW)	–	–	–	25th	–	–	–	–	–	–	–	420
45	Steady	Oney Anwar (INA)	–	–	–	25th	–	–	–	–	–	–	–	420
45	Steady	Matthew McGillivray (ZAF)	–	–	–	–	–	25th	–	–	–	–	–	420
45	Steady	Mateia Hiquily (PYF)	–	–	–	–	–	–	25th	–	–	–	–	420
45	Steady	Hiroto Ohhara (JPN)	–	–	–	–	–	–	–	25th	–	–	–	420
45	Steady	Jorgann Couzinet (FRA)	–	–	–	–	–	–	–	–	25th	–	–	420
45	Steady	Samuel Pupo (BRA)	–	–	–	–	–	–	–	–	–	25th	–	420
45	Steady	Vasco Ribeiro (PRT)	–	–	–	–	–	–	–	–	–	25th	–	420
45	Steady	Miguel Blanco (PRT)	–	–	–	–	–	–	–	–	–	25th	–	420
45	Steady	Benji Brand (HAW)	–	–	–	–	–	–	–	–	–	–	25th	420

- Championship Tour surfers best 9 of 11 results are combined to equal their final point total.
- Tournament results discarded

Legend

Champion
Men's QS 2019
Two worst results

== 2018 Women's Championship Tour ==
=== Event results ===
Round	Event	Women's champion	Women's Runner up
1	(Australia) Roxy Pro Gold Coast	(United States) Lakey Peterson	(Australia) Keely Andrew
2	(Australia) Rip Curl Women's Pro Bells Beach	(Australia) Stephanie Gilmore	(Brazil) Tatiana Weston-Webb
3	(Brazil) Oi Rio Women's Pro	(Australia) Stephanie Gilmore	(United States) Lakey Peterson
4	(Indonesia) Corona Bali Protected – Women's	(United States) Lakey Peterson	(Australia) Tyler Wright
5	(Indonesia) Uluwatu CT – Women's	(France) Johanne Defay	(Brazil) Tatiana Weston-Webb
6	(South Africa) Corona Open J-Bay – Women's	(Australia) Stephanie Gilmore	(United States) Lakey Peterson
7	(United States) Vans US Open of Surfing – Women's CT	(United States) Courtney Conlogue	(Australia) Stephanie Gilmore
8	(United States) Surf Ranch Pro	(Hawaii) Carissa Moore	(Australia) Stephanie Gilmore
9	Roxy Pro France	(United States) Courtney Conlogue	(Australia) Macy Callaghan
10	(Hawaii) Beachwaver Maui Pro	(Hawaii) Carissa Moore	(Hawaii) Malia Manuel

=== 2018 Women's Championship Tour Jeep Leaderboard ===
Points are awarded using the following structure:

Position	1st	2nd	3rd	5th	9th	13th	INJ	DNC
Points	10,000	7,800	6,085	4,745	3,085	1,390	1,390	0

Ranking	+/-	Surfer	(Australia) WCT 1 (Details)	(Australia) WCT 2 (Details)	(Brazil) WCT 3 (Details)	(Indonesia) WCT 4 (Details)	(Indonesia) WCT 5 (Details)	(South Africa) WCT 6 (Details)	(United States) WCT 7 (Details)	(United States) WCT 8 (Details)	(France) WCT 9 (Details)	(Hawaii) WCT 10 (Details)	Points
1	Steady	Stephanie Gilmore (AUS)	5th	1st	1st	5th	3rd	1st	2nd	2nd	9th	3rd	62.515
2	Steady	Lakey Peterson (USA)	1st	9th	2nd	1st	5th	2nd	5th	3rd	9th	13th	54.260
3	Steady	Carissa Moore (HAW)	5th	5th	5th	9th	5th	9th	3rd	1st	3rd	1st	51.150
4	Steady	Tatiana Weston-Webb (BRA)	13th	2nd	3rd	3rd	2nd	3rd	9th	9th	5th	5th	46.430
5	Steady	Johanne Defay (FRA)	9th	5th	9th	13th	1st	5th	5th	5th	5th	5th	41.555
6	Steady	Sally Fitzgibbons (AUS)	3rd	13th	5th	3rd	9th	13th	5th	5th	9th	5th	37.320
7	Steady	Caroline Marks (USA)	5th	3rd	9th	5th	9th	9th	3rd	3rd	13th	13th	37.000
8	Steady	Courtney Conlogue (USA)	INJ	INJ	INJ	13th	INJ	13th	1st	5th	1st	3rd	36.390
9	Steady	Malia Manuel (HAW)	3rd	13th	13th	5th	9th	9th	9th	13th	5th	2nd	34.020
10	Steady	Nikki Van Dijk (AUS)	13th	5th	3rd	13th	5th	9th	5th	9th	13th	9th	30.965
11	Steady	Coco Ho (HAW)	9th	9th	13th	9th	9th	5th	9th	5th	5th	13th	29.660
12	Steady	Tyler Wright (AUS)	5th	9th	9th	2nd	3rd	INJ	INJ	INJ	INJ	INJ	28.970
13	Steady	Silvana Lima (BRA)	9th	3rd	5th	5th	13th	13th	INJ	9th	INJ	INJ	25.915
14	Steady	Bronte Macaulay (AUS)	13th	13th	13th	13th	5th	5th	13th	13th	3rd	9th	24.220
15	Steady	Sage Erickson (USA)	13th	5th	9th	9th	13th	5th	13th	9th	13th	13th	22.915
16	Steady	Keely Andrew (AUS)	2nd	13th	5th	9th	13th	13th	13th	13th	13th	INJ	22.580
17	Steady	Macy Callaghan (AUS)	9th	13th	–	–	13th	13th	13th	13th	2nd	–	17.835
18	Steady	Paige Hareb (NZL)	13th	13th	13th	13th	13th	INJ	13th	13th	13th	5th	14.475
19	Steady	Bianca Buitendag (ZAF)	13th	–	–	–	–	3rd	–	–	–	–	7.475
20	Steady	Pauline Ado (FRA)	–	–	13th	–	–	–	9th	–	13th	–	5.865
21	Steady	Kobie Enright (AUS)	–	9th	–	–	–	–	–	–	–	–	3.085
21	Steady	Vahine Fierro (PYF)	–	–	–	–	–	–	–	–	9th	–	3.085
21	Steady	Summer Macedo (HAW)	–	–	–	–	–	–	–	–	–	9th	3.085
21	Steady	Alana Blanchard (HAW)	–	–	–	–	–	–	–	–	–	9th	3.085
25	Steady	Bethany Hamilton (HAW)	–	–	–	–	–	–	–	13th	–	13th	2.780
26	Steady	Mikaela Greene (AUS)	–	–	–	–	13th	–	–	–	–	–	1.390
26	Steady	Tais Almeida (BRA)	–	–	13th	–	–	–	–	–	–	–	1.390
26	Steady	Carol Henrique (PRT)	–	–	–	13th	–	–	–	–	–	–	1.390
26	Steady	Nicole Pallet (ZAF)	–	–	–	–	–	13th	–	–	–	–	1.390
26	Steady	Kirra Pinkerton (USA)	–	–	–	–	–	–	13th	–	–	–	1.390
26	Steady	Zoe McDougall (HAW)	–	–	–	–	–	–	–	–	–	13th	1.390

- Championship Tour surfers best 8 of 10 results are combined to equal their final point total.
- Tournament results discarded

Legend

Champion
Women's QS 2019
two worst results

== Qualifying Series ==
=== Men's Qualifying Series ===
Position	1st	2nd	3rd–4th	5th–8th	9th

Ranking	+/-	Surfer	Events					Points
Ranking	+/-	Surfer	1	2	3	4	5	Points
1	Steady	Kanoa Igarashi (JPN)	10.000	8.000	3.600	3.000	2.200	26.800
2	Steady	Griffin Colapinto (USA)	8.000	6.300	5.200	3.700	1.100	24.300
3	Steady	Seth Moniz (HAW)	6.500	5.200	5.100	4.500	1.000	22.300
4	Steady	Ryan Callinan (AUS)	10.000	6.000	2.300	2.100	1.260	21.660
5	Steady	Peterson Crisanto (BRA)	10.000	3.700	2.650	2.300	2.100	20.750
6	Steady	Jesse Mendes (BRA)	8.000	5.300	3.700	2.250	1.000	20.250
7	Steady	Deivid Silva (BRA)	6.300	6.000	5.200	1.260	1.100	19.860
8	Steady	Ricardo Christie (NZL)	6.700	5.200	3.700	2.100	1.050	18.750
9	Steady	Leonardo Fioravanti (ITA)	5.300	5.200	3.600	3.000	1.550	18.650
10	Steady	Jadson André (BRA)	6.500	5.100	2.650	2.650	1.260	18.160
11	Steady	Soli Bailey (AUS)	5.300	3.800	3.700	3.700	700	17.200
12	Steady	Ezekiel Lau (HAW)	10.000	2.200	2.200	2.100	600	17.100
13	Steady	Jack Freestone (AUS)	8.000	3.600	1.100	1.000	700	14.400
14	Steady	Ethan Ewing (AUS)	5.200	2.650	2.300	2.200	1.680	14.030

Legend

Men's CT 2019

=== 2018 Women's Qualifying Series ===
Position	1st	2nd	3rd–4th	5th–8th	9th

Ranking	+/-	Surfer	Events					Points
Ranking	+/-	Surfer	1	2	3	4	5	Points
1	Steady	Caroline Marks (USA)	6.000	6.000	4.500	2.650	1.550	20.700
2	Steady	Nikki Van Dijk (AUS)	6.000	6.000	2.650	2.650	1.550	18.850
3	Steady	Coco Ho (HAW)	6.000	6.000	3.550	1.550	1.550	18.650
4	Steady	Paige Hareb (NZL)	3.550	3.550	3.000	2.650	2.650	15.400
5	Steady	Bronte Macaulay (AUS)	4.500	3.550	2.650	2.650	1.550	14.900
6	Steady	Macy Callaghan (AUS)	4.500	3.550	2.650	1.550	1.550	13.800
7	Steady	Brisa Hennessy (CRI)	3.550	3.000	2.650	2.650	1.550	13.400
8	Steady	Malia Manuel (HAW)	4.500	3.550	3.550	1.050	700	13.350
9	Steady	Silvana Lima (BRA)	3.550	2.650	2.650	2.650	1.680	13.180
10	Steady	Keely Andrew (AUS)	3.550	3.550	2.650	1.550	1.550	12.850
11	Steady	Tatiana Weston-Webb (BRA)	4.500	3.550	1.550	1.550	1.550	12.700
12	Steady	Sage Erickson (USA)	4.500	2.650	2.650	1.550	1.050	12.400
13	Steady	Philippa Anderson (AUS)	3.550	2.650	2.650	1.680	1.550	12.080

Legend

Women's CT 2019
