= O'Neill Sebastian Inlet Pro =

The O'Neill Sebastian Inlet Pro (or SI Pro), currently presented by Ron Jon Surf Shop, has kicked off the international professional surfing calendar for the past five years. It is a 4 Star WQS event held at Space Coast in Florida and is, according to Go211, the "largest single sporting event in East Central Florida", the 2008 competition attracting 24 000 spectators.

The event also includes the Red Bull Tow-At, where ten invitees are pulled into surf at high speed by a Sea-Doo watercraft in an attempt to pull spectacular moves and win a craft for themselves.

Over 200 surfers will compete for a purse of $85 000 this year, as well as the all-important WQS points.

Past highlights include Kelly Slater's 2005 second place in the season he won his seventh World Tour title and wins for Damien Hobgood (2006), C J Hobgood (2007) and Patrick Gudauskas (2008).

The O'Neill SI Pro and the Red Bull Tow-At were both founded by Mitch Varnes of Board Sports Management, Inc. Varnes is the owner of both events and trademark owner of "Tow-At".

== 2009 Event ==
Jan 12 - Jan 18 Winner: Nathaniel Curran (USA)

The event was due to commence on Monday 12 January but poor conditions delayed the start until Wednesday 14th.

By the end of round two, Floridans Ryan Helm, Jody Davis and Sean Tubby, the latter surfing his local break, had benefitted from their experience in the small wave conditions where patience definitely seemed a virtue. Other third round (last 96) qualifiers included Chilean Danny Estes and Mexican Pipeline star Angelo Lozano. Lozano, holder of the PXM International Vans Pro in Mexico, scored the highest heat total of that round (15.17).

But it was Dream Tour rookie Nathaniel Curran who claimed victory, last years WQS winner defeating Floridan Aaron Cormican with a score of 15.43. Just back from the World Junior Championships, Blake Jones, who had already despatched Gabe Kling (Quarter-Finals) and Brett Simpson (Semi-Finals) took third place. Cory Lopez, despite starting well, finished fourth after failing to achieve a good second wave score.

Surfer	Nationality	Points
Nathaniel Curran	USA	15.43
Aaron Cormican	USA	15.07
Blake Jones	USA	11.80
Cory Lopez	USA	10.60
