= Miguel Blanco =

Portuguese surfer and environmental activist

Personal information
- Born: Lisbon, Portugal

Surfing career
- Sport: Surfing
- Sponsors: Oxbow, Corona
- Major achievements: 2011 – European Grom Search Title Winner 2015 – WSL European Pro-Junior Caparica Champion 2016 – Volcom Crustaceous European Tour Winner 2018 – Portuguese National Championship Title Winner 2018 – Surfer Magazine cover shot 2019 – Portuguese National Championship Title Winner

Surfing specifications
- Stance: Regular

Miguel Blanco is a Portuguese surfer and environmental advocate from Lisbon. He is a two-time Portuguese national surfing champion and has competed in events on the World Surf League (WSL) Championship Tour and Qualifying Series.

He has appeared on the cover of Surfer Magazine and has directed several surf films, including Tropical Popsicle, The Passenger, and The Passenger II.

Blanco is involved with environmental organizations such as the Save the Waves Coalition, the Surfrider Foundation, the Hope Zones Foundation, and Seatrees.

== Early life ==
Blanco was born in Lisbon, Portugal, and later moved to São Pedro do Estoril (Cascais). His early surfing took place at Praia de São Pedro do Estoril, where he trained during his youth. At age 11, he received his first sponsorship from Lightning Bolt.

== Competitive surfing career ==
After winning the European Grom Search title in 2011, the WSL European Pro-Junior Caparica event in 2015, and the Volcom Crustaceous European Tour in 2016, Blanco began competing internationally.

In 2016 he surfed in the Meo Rip Curl Pro Portugal event, where he competed against eventual world champion John John Florence.

Blanco won the Portuguese National Championship in both 2018 and 2019.

== Big wave surfing ==
Blanco has participated in several major big-wave events. He appeared on the cover of Surfer Magazine for a session at Nias, Indonesia, and surfed during the XXL "Márcio Swell" in Hawaii in early 2023.

== Environmental activism ==
Blanco has worked on several environmental initiatives. In 2020 he partnered with the World Wide Fund for Nature on a campaign addressing ocean plastic pollution.

He joined Save the Waves Coalition for an expedition to the Azores in 2021, and later contributed to environmental education and restoration projects through the ECOBOARD Project and Seatrees.

In 2024 he organized the Onda Limpa Tour, a community surf-based cleanup initiative across Portugal.

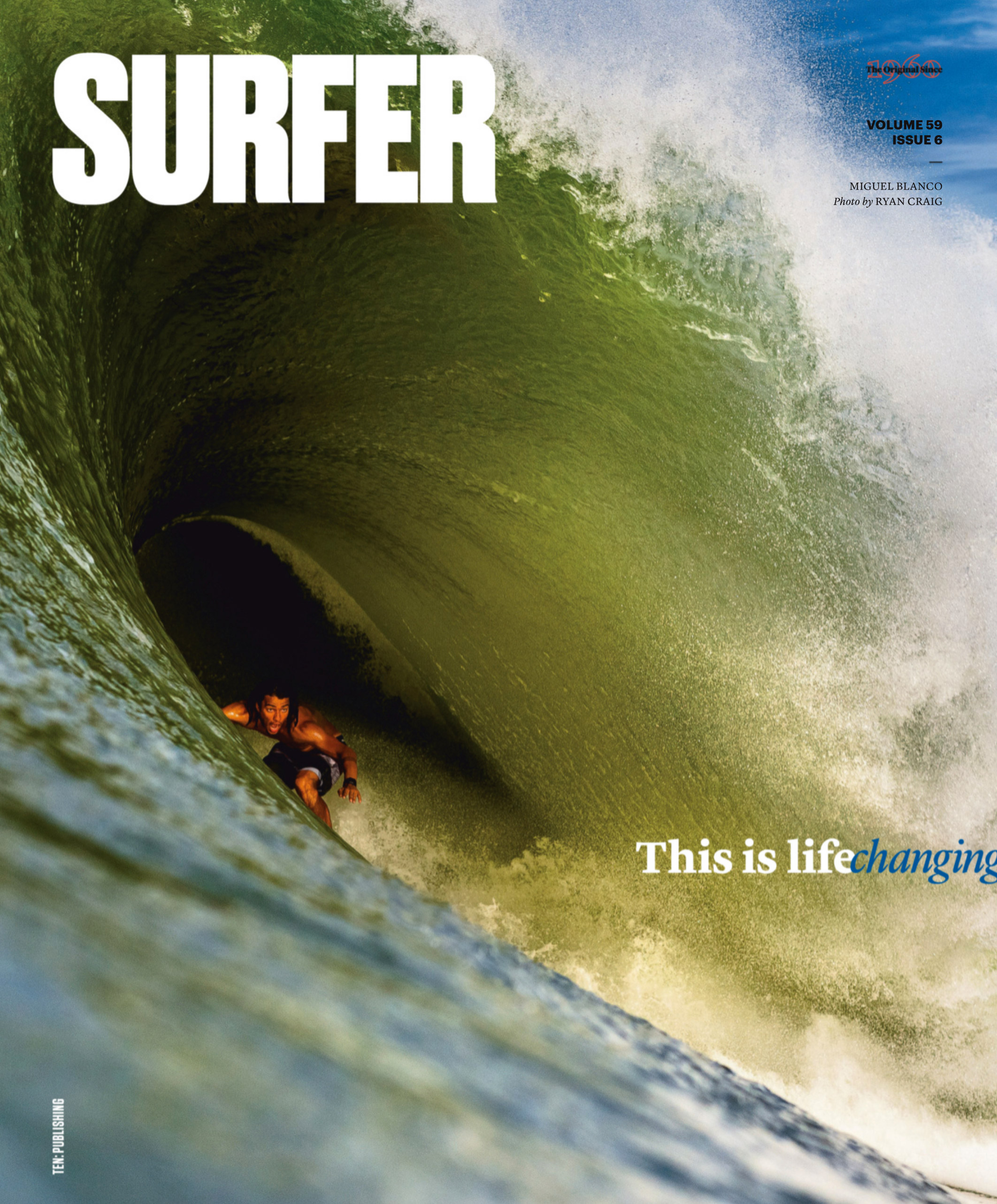
Miguel Blanco on the cover of Surfer Magazine

== Media and films ==
Blanco has produced several short surf films and participated in projects by Rip Curl, Nic Von Rupp and others. His IMPACT series, focused on conservation themes, is available on Fuel TV and YouTube.
