= Frederico Morais =

Portuguese surfer (born 1992)

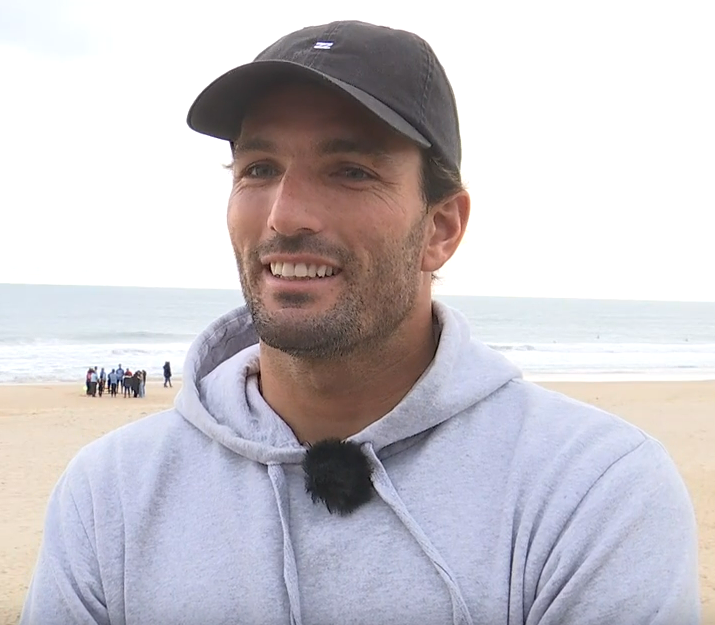
- Morais in 2024

Personal information
- Nickname: Kikas
- Born: Frederico Rodrigues de Assunção Morais; 3 January 1992 (age 34) Cascais, Portugal
- Height: 6 ft 1 in (1.85 m)
- Weight: 178 lb (81 kg)

Surfing career
- Sport: Surfing
- Best year: 2021
- Career earnings: $430,150
- Sponsors: Billabong, Ericeira Surf & Skate, MEO, Monster Energy, Ocean & Earth, Oceanário de Lisboa, Samsung
- Major achievements: 2019 World Qualifying Series Champion; 3× Portuguese National Champion (2013, 2015, 2020)

Surfing specifications
- Stance: Regular (natural foot)
Medal record
World Games
Bronze medal – third place	2021 La Libertad	Team

Frederico Rodrigues de Assunção Morais (born 3 January 1992), also known as Kikas, is a Portuguese professional surfer who competes on the World Surfing League Men's Championship Tour since 2017. He qualified to represent Portugal at the 2020 Summer Olympics in the men's shortboard event, but did not compete.

== Career Victories ==
WQS Wins
Year	Event	Venue	Country
2019	Hawaiian Pro	Haleiwa, Oahu	Hawaii
2019	Azores Airlines Pro	Santa Bárbara, São Miguel Island, Azores	Portugal
2019	Pro Santa Cruz	Praia da Fisica, Santa Cruz, Portugal	Portugal
2016	Martinique Surf Pro	Basse Pointe, Martinique, French West Indies	France

=== WSL World Championship Tour ===
Tournament	2015	2016	2017	2018	2021	2022	2024
Quiksilver Pro Gold Coast	-	-	13th	13th			
Rip Curl Pro	-	-	25th	5th		17th	
Margaret River Pro	-	-	5th	25th		17th	
Corona Bali Protected	-	-	-	13th			
Uluwatu CT	-	-	-	25th			
Rio Pro	-	-	13th	13th			
Fiji Pro	-	-	-	13th			
J-Bay Open	-	-	2nd	9th			
Billabong Pro Teahupoo	-	-	25th	13th			
Surf Ranch Open	-	-	-	25th	9th		
Hurley Pro at Trestles	-	-	5th			-	
Quiksilver Pro France	-	-	13th	25th			
MEO Rip Curl Pro Portugal	5th	13th	9th	9th		9th	
Billabong Pipeline Masters	-	-	25th	-	25th	17th	17th
Rip Curl Newcastle Cup	-	-	-	-	9th		
Rip Curl Narrabeen Classic	-	-	-	-	3rd		
Rip Curl Rottnest Search presented by Corona	-	-	-	-	17th		
Corona Open Mexico presented by Quiksilver	-	-	-	-	5th		
Hurley Pro Sunset Beach	-	-	-	-	-	17th	9th
Rank	41st	44th	13th	22nd	10th	29th	17th
Earnings	$15,000	$19,500	$149,000	$124,400	$89,000	$53,000	$30,360

== Nominations and awards ==
Year	Award	Category	Result
2014	Golden Globes	Best Newcomer	Nominated
2017	EuroSima	Best European Male Surfer of the Year	Won
