= Jérémy Florès =

French surfer

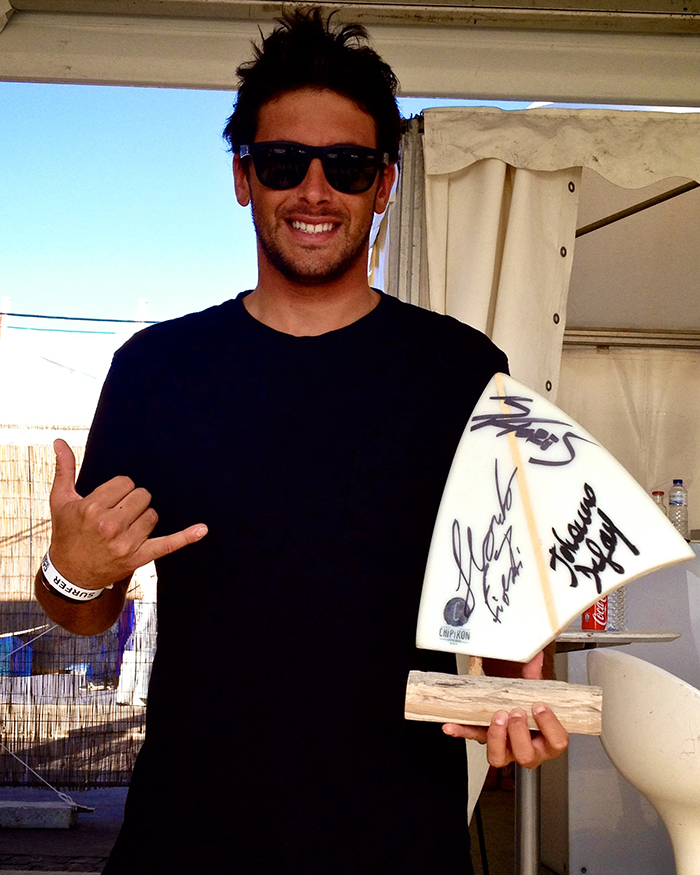

Personal information
- Born: 27 April 1988 (age 38) Reunion Island, France
- Years active: 2007–present
- Height: 5 ft 8 in (1.73 m)
- Weight: 150 lb (68 kg)
- Website: jeremy-flores.com

Surfing career
- Sport: Surfing
- Best year: 2015 - Ranked #8 WSL CT World Tour
- Sponsors: Quiksilver, FCS traction and fins, JS Industries surfboards
- Major achievements: WSL Championship Tour event wins: 4; 2007 WSL Rookie of the Year; 2006 World Qualifying Series Champion; WSL European Tour 2005(Jr's),2013(Men's); 2009 ISA World Surfing Games Champion; ISA World Surf Games 2017(Team France)

Surfing specifications
- Stance: Regular
Medal record
Men's surfing
Representing France
World Games
Gold medal – first place	2021 La Bocana	Team
Bronze medal – third place	2021 La Bocana	Team

Jérémy Florès (born 27 April 1988) is a French professional surfer. He is widely considered to be the most successful European surfer of all time.

== Early life ==
Florès was born on Reunion Island, France, where he began surfing at the age of 3. He continued his surfing development on family trips to Australia, Europe and Hawaii, maintaining his education through correspondence courses.

== Career ==
=== Surfing ===
Florès turned professional in 2007, the same year in which he was named Rookie of the Year by the WSL.

He won the Billabong Pipeline Masters in Hawaii in 2010 and 2017.

In 2015, Florès beat reigning champion Gabriel Medina in the prestigious Billabong Pro Teahupoo, Tahiti with a 16.57 total heat score.

On October 11, 2019, Florès won the Quiksilver Pro France held in Hossegor of southwest France. He did so by dominating finals day, getting the highest scores in all of the rounds that day, including a 15.50 in the Round of 16, 14.40 in the Quarterfinals, 16.33 in the Semis and 15.00 in the Finals. He scored 8+ waves in the Rounds of 16 and 8, following up with a 9-point wave in the Semis and a near perfect 9.67 in the Finals.

In 2021, Florès announced that he was stepping back from full-time competition in order spend more time with family and developing the next generation of Francophone surfers.

=== Coaching ===
Florès was head coach for Team France in the surfing event of the 2024 Summer Olympics at Teahupo‘o in Tahiti.

== Personal life ==
Florès lives on Tahiti with his partner Hinarani de Longeaux and their daughter, Hinahei.

== Competition history ==
WCT Wins
Year	Event	Venue	Country
2019	Quicksilver Pro France	Hossegor, Nouvelle-Aquitaine	France
2017	Billabong Pipeline Masters	Banzai Pipeline, Oahu	Hawaii
2015	Billabong Pro Teahupoo	Teahupo'o, Tahiti	Tahiti
2010	Billabong Pipeline Masters	Banzai Pipeline, Oahu	Hawaii
WQS Wins
Year	Event	Venue	Country
2007	Buondi Billabong Pro	Ribeira D'Ilhas, Ericeira	Portugal

== See also ==
- ASP World Tour
