= Patrick Gudauskas =

American/Lithuanian surfer

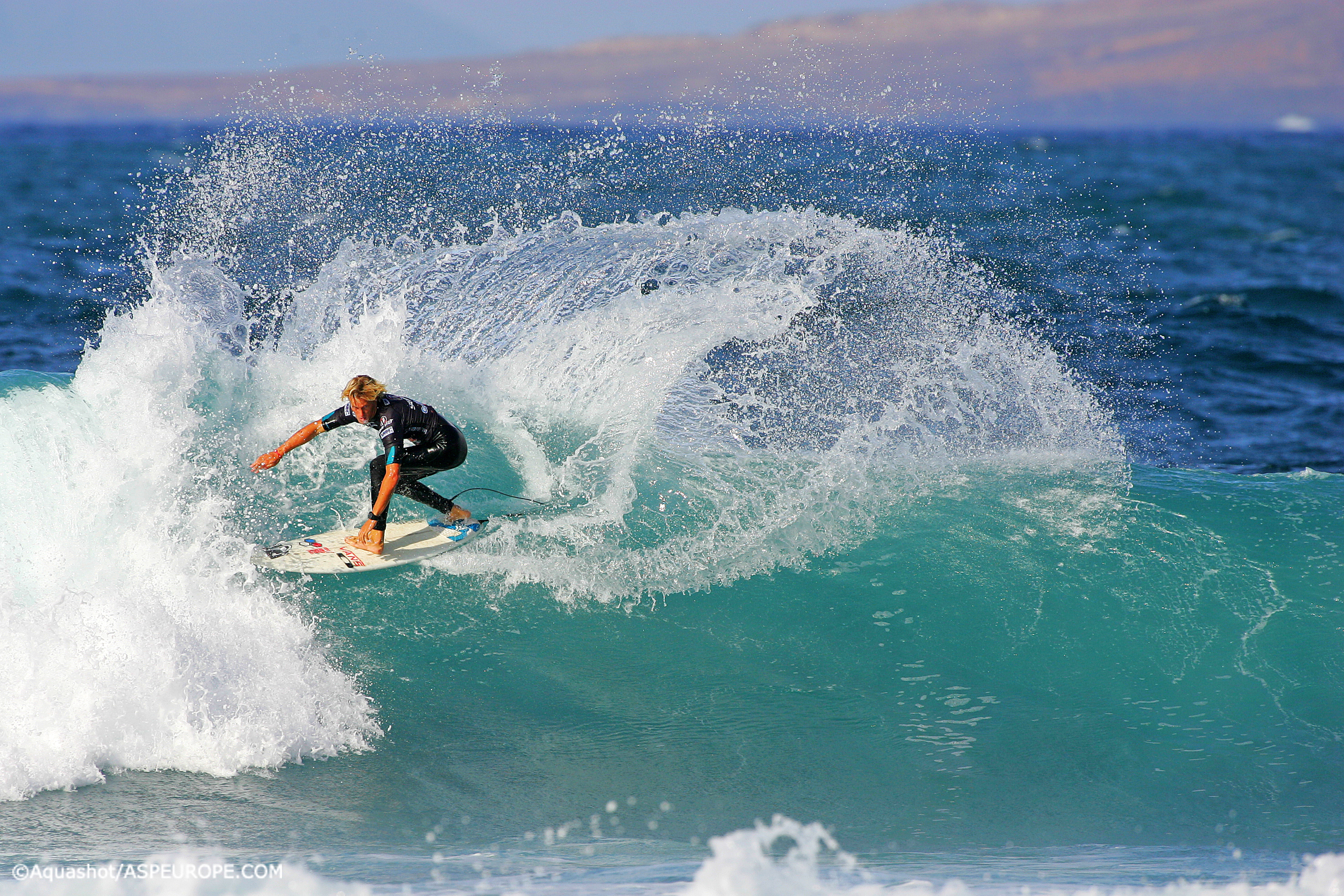
Patrick Gudauskas at the Islas Canarias Santa Pro in 2009

Patrick Gudauskas (born November 20, 1985, in La Jolla) is an American/Lithuanian professional surfer. He won several surfing competitions, including the 2008 O'Neill Sebastian Inlet Pro.
