= Julian Wilson (surfer) =

Australian surfer (born 1988)

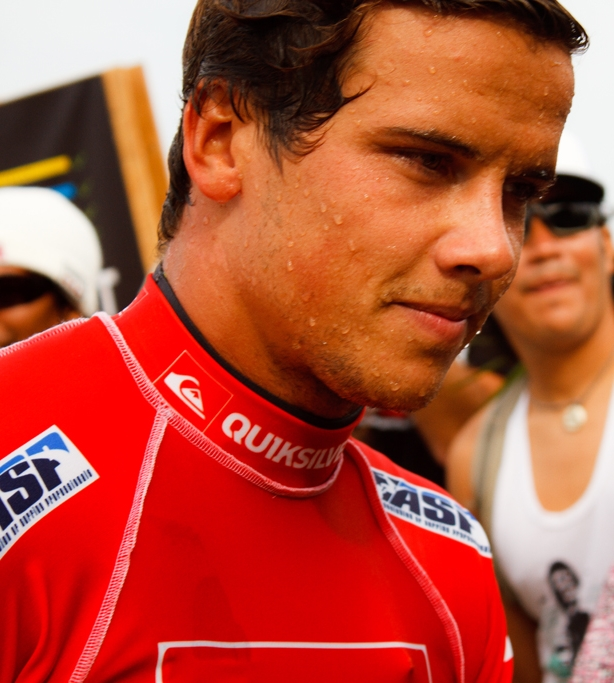
- Wilson at the Quiksilver Pro France 2013 in Hossegor

Personal information
- Born: 8 November 1988 (age 37) Coolum Beach, Queensland, Australia
- Height: 6 ft 0 in (1.83 m)
- Weight: 180 lb (82 kg)
- Website: JulianWilson.com

Surfing career
- Sport: Surfing
- Best year: 2018 - Ranked #2 WSL CT World Tour
- Career earnings: $1,491,250
- Sponsors: Hurley Clothing, Nike Footwear, Red Bull Energy, Oakley Eyewear, FCS traction and fins, Sunbum Sunscreen, Catch Surf and JS Industries surfboards
- Major achievements: WSL Championship Tour event wins: 5; 2011 WSL Rookie of the Year; 2014 Vans Triple Crown of Surfing Champion; 1x US Open of Surfing champion (2012)

Surfing specifications
- Stance: Regular (natural foot)
- Shaper: JS industries
- Quiver: 6'0 x 18 1/2" x 2 ¼"
- Favorite waves: Coolum Beach, Huntington Pier
- Favorite maneuvers: Barrels, air reverse, sushi roll

Julian Wilson (born 8 November 1988) is an Australian professional surfer who competes on the World Surf League Men's World Tour.

== Personal life ==
Wilson was born and raised in Coolum Beach, Queensland. He is an ambassador for the National Breast Cancer Foundation. Wilson's mother is a breast cancer survivor, and he was inspired to ride a pink board by a close family friend and international cricketer, Matthew Hayden, who plays with a pink bat for the corresponding cause.

Wilson was in the water during the final of the J-Bay Open 2015 in South Africa when three-time world champion Mick Fanning was attacked by a great white shark. He paddled towards Fanning to assist, was praised for his action, and was subsequently hailed as a hero. The event was cancelled. Both surfers escaped unharmed and gifted a shared second-place result. Following the ordeal, Wilson gave a tear-filled interview, and when asked, "You guys are locked in a title battle right now, and to put things into perspective, does that mean anything to you at this point?" he replied, "No, not at all, I'm just happy he's alive."

== Surfing career ==
2011 Accomplishments:

- Ranked #9 on the 2011 ASP World Tour
- Rookie of the Year 2011

2012 Accomplishments:

- Won first ASP World Tour event – Rip Curl Pro Portugal (Peniche, Portugal)
- Ranked #9 on the 2012 ASP World Tour rankings

Wilson then won the Hawaii Billabong Pipeline Master in 2014, the Billabong Pro Teahupoo in Tahiti in 2017, the Quiksilver Pro Gold Coast in 2018, and the Quiksilver Pro France in 2018.

Wilson qualified for the Tokyo 2020 Olympics. He lost to Gabriel Medina from Brazil in the third round of the men's shortboard. Australia at the 2020 Summer Olympics details the results in depth.

== Career victories ==
ASP-WCT Wins
Year	Event	Venue	Country
2018	Quiksilver Pro France	Hossegor, Nouvelle-Aquitaine	France
2018	Quiksilver Pro Gold Coast	Gold Coast, Queensland	Australia
2017	Billabong Pro Teahupoo	Teahupo'o, Tahiti	French Polynesia
2014	Billabong Pipeline Masters	Banzai Pipeline, Oahu	Hawaii
2012	Rip Curl Pro Portugal	Supertubos, Peniche	Portugal
WQS Wins
Year	Event	Venue	Country
2025	Genesis Health & Fitness Women's Pro & EJE Men's Pro	Newcastle, New South Wales	Australia
2020	Surfest Newcastle Pro	Newcastle, New South Wales	Australia
2013	Mr Price Pro Ballito	Ballito, KwaZulu-Natal	South Africa
2012	Nike US Open of Surfing presented by Pacifico	Huntington Beach, California	United States
2012	Breaka Burleigh Pro	Burleigh Heads, Queensland	Australia
2011	Quiksilver Pro Portugal	Ribeira D'Ilhas, Ericeira	Portugal
2010	SriLankan Airlines Pro	Arugam Bay	Sri Lanka
