= Billabong Pro Teahupoo 2016 =

Billabong Pro Teahupoo at the Surf
- Dates: 19 to 30 August
- Competitors: 36 from 7 nations

Medalists
| gold medal | Kelly Slater | United States |
| silver medal | John Florence | Hawaii |

The Billabong Pro Teahupoo 2016 was an event of the Association of Surfing Professionals for 2016 World Surf League.

This event was held from 19 to 30 August at Teahupo'o, (Tahiti, French Polynesia) and opposed by 36 surfers. Pre-trials began on 13 August.

The tournament was won by Kelly Slater (USA), who beat John Florence (HAW) in final.

== Round 1 ==
Heat 1
| 1 | Jordy Smith | (South Africa) | 8.00 |
| 2 | Ryan Callinan | (Australia) | 3.27 |
| 3 | Dusty Payne | (Hawaii) | 0.00 |

Heat 2
| 1 | Italo Ferreira | (Brazil) | 13.50 |
| 2 | Keanu Asing | (Hawaii) | 7.40 |
| 3 | Kanoa Igarashi | (United States) | 5.34 |

Heat 3
| 1 | Kai Otton | (Australia) | 14.33 |
| 2 | A. de Souza | (Brazil) | 5.33 |
| 3 | Miguel Pupo | (Brazil) | 4.66 |

Heat 4
| 1 | Gabriel Medina | (Brazil) | 13.60 |
| 2 | Conner Coffin | (United States) | 5.60 |
| 3 | Alex Ribeiro | (Brazil) | 3.47 |

Heat 5
| 1 | John Florence | (Hawaii) | 18.40 |
| 2 | Davey Cathels | (Australia) | 12.33 |
| 3 | H. Teriinatoofa | (French Polynesia) | 4.50 |

Heat 6
| 1 | Bruno Santos | (Brazil) | 11.90 |
| 2 | Matt Wilkinson | (Australia) | 8.50 |
| 3 | Stuart Kennedy | (Australia) | 7.37 |

Heat 7
| 1 | Kelly Slater | (United States) | 15.00 |
| 2 | Michel Bourez | (French Polynesia) | 14.83 |
| 3 | Matt Banting | (Australia) | 9.30 |

Heat 8
| 1 | Jérémy Florès | (France) | 11.43 |
| 2 | Julian Wilson | (Australia) | 8.20 |
| 3 | Nat Young | (United States) | 5.33 |

Heat 9
| 1 | Sebastian Zietz | (Hawaii) | 16.07 |
| 2 | Josh Kerr | (Australia) | 12.03 |
| 3 | Jadson Andre | (Brazil) | 10.44 |

Heat 10
| 1 | Adrian Buchan | (Australia) | 12.00 |
| 2 | Joel Parkinson | (Australia) | 5.87 |
| 3 | Alejo Muniz | (Brazil) | 2.96 |

Heat 11
| 1 | Kolohe Andino | (United States) | 13.50 |
| 2 | Jack Freestone | (Australia) | 12.80 |
| 3 | Caio Ibelli | (Brazil) | 8.70 |

Heat 12
| 1 | Adan Melling | (Australia) | 17.67 |
| 2 | Wiggolly Dantas | (Brazil) | 12.24 |
| 3 | Filipe Toledo | (Brazil) | 9.10 |

== Round 2 ==
| Heat 1: 1 / Matt Wilkinson / (Australia) / 14.17; 2 / H. Teriinatoofa / (French Polynesia) / 13.50 | Heat 2: 1 / Alex Ribeiro / (Brazil) / 6.23; 2 / A. de Souza / (Brazil) / 5.70 | Heat 3: 1 / Keanu Asing / (Hawaii) / 9.67; 2 / Michel Bourez / (French Polynesia) / 8.57 | Heat 4: 1 / Julian Wilson / (Australia) / 13.84; 2 / Ryan Callinan / (Australia) / 13.50 |

| Heat 5: 1 / Matt Banting / (Australia) / 10.93; 2 / Caio Ibelli / (Brazil) / 8.33 | Heat 6: 1 / Jadson Andre / (Brazil) / 10.43; 2 / Filipe Toledo / (Brazil) / 6.63 | Heat 7: 1 / Alejo Muniz / (Brazil) / 11.17; 2 / Wiggolly Dantas / (Brazil) / 6.23 | Heat 8: 1 / Joel Parkinson / (Australia) / 14.00; 2 / Jack Freestone / (Australia) / 2.03 |

| Heat 9: 1 / Josh Kerr / (Australia) / 12.17; 2 / Stuart Kennedy / (Australia) / 11.00 | Heat 10: 1 / Nat Young / (United States) / 11.40; 2 / Davey Cathels / (Australia) / 10.10 | Heat 11: 1 / Dusty Payne / (Hawaii) / 14.27; 2 / Conner Coffin / (United States) / 13.74 | Heat 12: 1 / Kanoa Igarashi / (United States) / 14.34; 2 / Miguel Pupo / (Brazil) / 12.33 |

== Round 3 ==
| Heat 1: 1 / Keanu Asing / (Hawaii) / 14.07; 2 / Italo Ferreira / (Brazil) / 12.43 | Heat 2: 1 / Kolohe Andino / (United States) / 15.03; 2 / Adan Melling / (Australia) / 5.67 | Heat 3: 1 / Jordy Smith / (South Africa) / 7.00; 2 / Matt Banting / (Australia) / 5.17 | Heat 4: 1 / Adrian Buchan / (Australia) / 15.50; 2 / Alejo Muniz / (Brazil) / 7.33 |

| Heat 5: 1 / Kelly Slater / (United States) / 17.50; 2 / Nat Young / (United States) / 12.50 | Heat 6: 1 / Bruno Santos / (Brazil) / 12.33; 2 / Matt Wilkinson / (Australia) / 6.83 | Heat 7: 1 / John Florence / (Hawaii) / 13.33; 2 / Alex Ribeiro / (Brazil) / 8.57 | Heat 8: 1 / Josh Kerr / (Australia) / 17.44; 2 / Dusty Payne / (Hawaii) / 4.37 |

| Heat 9: 1 / Jadson Andre / (Brazil) / 12.07; 2 / Sebastian Zietz / (Hawaii) / 9.57 | Heat 10: 1 / Julian Wilson / (Australia) / 16.03; 2 / Jérémy Florès / (France) / 14.77 | Heat 11: 1 / Joel Parkinson / (Australia) / 15.53; 2 / Kanoa Igarashi / (United States) / 5.20 | Heat 12: 1 / Gabriel Medina / (Brazil) / 15.66; 2 / Kai Otton / (Australia) / 7.83 |

== Round 4 ==
Heat 1
| 1 | Kolohe Andino | (United States) | 15.30 |
| 2 | Jordy Smith | (South Africa) | 12.63 |
| 3 | Keanu Asing | (Hawaii) | 11.63 |

Heat 2
| 1 | Bruno Santos | (Brazil) | 18.30 |
| 2 | Kelly Slater | (United States) | 18.17 |
| 3 | Adrian Buchan | (Australia) | 8.33 |

Heat 3
| 1 | Josh Kerr | (Australia) | 11.00 |
| 2 | Jadson Andre | (Brazil) | 10.06 |
| 3 | John Florence | (Hawaii) | 2.96 |

Heat 4
| 1 | Julian Wilson | (Australia) | 17.97 |
| 2 | Joel Parkinson | (Australia) | 13.04 |
| 3 | Gabriel Medina | (Brazil) | 10.60 |

== Round 5 ==
| Heat 1: 1 / Adrian Buchan / (Australia) / 16.77; 2 / Jordy Smith / (South Africa) / 12.60 | Heat 2: 1 / Kelly Slater / (United States) / 20.00; 2 / Keanu Asing / (Hawaii) / 14.70 | Heat 3: 1 / Gabriel Medina / (Brazil) / 15.43; 2 / Jadson Andre / (Brazil) / 14.33 | Heat 4: 1 / John Florence / (Hawaii) / 18.30; 2 / Joel Parkinson / (Australia) / 15.90 |

== Quarter finals ==
| Heat 1: 1 / Adrian Buchan / (Australia) / 16.16; 2 / Kolohe Andino / (United States) / 16.00 | Heat 2: 1 / Kelly Slater / (United States) / 19.27; 2 / Bruno Santos / (Brazil) / 17.43 | Heat 3: 1 / Gabriel Medina / (Brazil) / 17.90; 2 / Josh Kerr / (Australia) / 13.40 | Heat 4: 1 / John Florence / (Hawaii) / 17.34; 2 / Julian Wilson / (Australia) / 16.60 |

== Semi finals ==
| Heat 1: 1 / Kelly Slater / (United States) / 18.40; 2 / Adrian Buchan / (Australia) / 16.10 | Heat 2: 1 / John Florence / (Hawaii) / 19.66; 2 / Gabriel Medina / (Brazil) / 19.23 |

== Final ==
Heat 1
| 1 | Kelly Slater | (United States) | 19.67 |
| 2 | John Florence | (Hawaii) | 15.23 |
