= J-Bay Open 2016 =

J-Bay Open 2016 at the Surf
- Location: Jeffreys Bay (ZAF)
- Dates: 6 to 17 July
- Competitors: 36 from 7 nations

Medalists
gold medal	Mick Fanning	Australia
silver medal	John Florence	Hawaii

The J-Bay Open 2016 was an event of the Association of Surfing Professionals for 2016 World Surf League.

This event was held from 6 to 17 July at Jeffreys Bay, (Eastern Cape, South Africa) and opposed by 36 surfers.

The tournament was won by Mick Fanning (AUS), who beat John Florence (HAW) in final.

== Round 1 ==
Heat 1
1	Mick Fanning	(Australia)	13.67
2	Alejo Muniz	(Brazil)	10.80
3	Conner Coffin	(United States)	9.97

Heat 2
1	Italo Ferreira	(Brazil)	13.33
2	Miguel Pupo	(Brazil)	12.06
3	Ryan Callinan	(Australia)	8.43

Heat 3
1	Kanoa Igarashi	(United States)	15.64
2	John Florence	(Hawaii)	13.24
3	Keanu Asing	(Hawaii)	12.60

Heat 4
1	A. de Souza	(Brazil)	14.76
2	Kai Otton	(Australia)	10.80
3	Josh Kerr	(Australia)	7.00

Heat 5
1	Gabriel Medina	(Brazil)	17.27
2	Dusty Payne	(Hawaii)	12.77
3	Alex Ribeiro	(Brazil)	12.27

Heat 6
1	Davey Cathels	(Australia)	11.33
2	Matt Wilkinson	(Australia)	10.33
3	Steven Sawyer	(South Africa)	7.43

Heat 7
1	Kelly Slater	(United States)	12.26
2	Filipe Toledo	(Brazil)	12.00
3	Matt Banting	(Australia)	9.43

Heat 8
1	Kolohe Andino	(United States)	14.16
2	Jadson Andre	(Brazil)	12.66
3	Adrian Buchan	(Australia)	12.50

Heat 9
1	Jordy Smith	(South Africa)	16.43
2	Wiggolly Dantas	(Brazil)	15.10
3	Adan Melling	(Australia)	9.40

Heat 10
1	Caio Ibelli	(Brazil)	15.26
2	Joel Parkinson	(Australia)	13.60
3	Jérémy Florès	(France)	12.90

Heat 11
1	Julian Wilson	(Australia)	18.77
2	Jack Freestone	(Australia)	10.17
3	Nat Young	(United States)	7.50

Heat 12
1	Sebastian Zietz	(Hawaii)	17.90
2	Michel Bourez	(French Polynesia)	9.90
3	Stuart Kennedy	(Australia)	9.74

== Round 2 ==
Heat 1: 1 / Matt Wilkinson / (Australia) / 8.47; 2 / Steven Sawyer / (South Africa) / 7.93	Heat 2: 1 / John Florence / (Hawaii) / 17.27; 2 / Alex Ribeiro / (Brazil) / 11.77	Heat 3: 1 / Filipe Toledo / (Brazil) / 16.54; 2 / Kai Otton / (Australia) / 14.34	Heat 4: 1 / Adrian Buchan / (Australia) / 10.50; 2 / Keanu Asing / (Hawaii) / 3.87

Heat 5: 1 / Michel Bourez / (French Polynesia) / 16.07; 2 / Ryan Callinan / (Australia) / 12.90	Heat 6: 1 / Alejo Muniz / (Brazil) / 14.27; 2 / Nat Young / (United States) / 12.93	Heat 7: 1 / Joel Parkinson / (Australia) / 15.17; 2 / Matt Banting / (Australia) / 12.17	Heat 8: 1 / Wiggolly Dantas / (Brazil) / 18.27; 2 / Jadson Andre / (Brazil) / 17.13

Heat 9: 1 / Adan Melling / (Australia) / 14.86; 2 / Conner Coffin / (United States) / 14.97	Heat 10: 1 / Miguel Pupo / (Brazil) / 15.67; 2 / Jérémy Florès / (France) / 13.44	Heat 11: 1 / Josh Kerr / (Australia) / 18.06; 2 / Jack Freestone / (Australia) / 15.26	Heat 12: 1 / Dusty Payne / (Hawaii) / 17.47; 2 / Stuart Kennedy / (Australia) / 11.44

== Round 3 ==
Heat 1: 1 / Jordy Smith / (South Africa) / 18.20; 2 / Kolohe Andino / (United States) / 10.10	Heat 2: 1 / John Florence / (Hawaii) / 14.83; 2 / Dusty Payne / (Hawaii) / 13.93	Heat 3: 1 / Josh Kerr / (Australia) / 16.40; 2 / Italo Ferreira / (Brazil) / 14.20	Heat 4: 1 / Kelly Slater / (United States) / 11.73; 2 / Adrian Buchan / (Australia) / 5.20

Heat 5: 1 / Michel Bourez / (French Polynesia) / 14.67; 2 / Sebastian Zietz / (Hawaii) / 11.26	Heat 6: 1 / Alejo Muniz / (Brazil) / 12.20; 2 / Matt Wilkinson / (Australia) / 10.27	Heat 7: 1 / Gabriel Medina / (Brazil) / 16.00; 2 / Adan Melling / (Australia) / 15.17	Heat 8: 1 / Julian Wilson / (Australia) / 15.80; 2 / Joel Parkinson / (Australia) / 13.67

Heat 9: 1 / Filipe Toledo / (Brazil) / 16.67; 2 / Miguel Pupo / (Brazil) / 6.04	Heat 10: 1 / Mick Fanning / (Australia) / 18.37; 2 / Kanoa Igarashi / (United States) / 14.60	Heat 11: 1 / Wiggolly Dantas / (Brazil) / 13.93; 2 / Caio Ibelli / (Brazil) / 10.66	Heat 12: 1 / A. de Souza / (Brazil) / 14.73; 2 / Davey Cathels / (Australia) / 12.30

== Round 4 ==
Heat 1
1	John Florence	(Hawaii)	17.43
2	Jordy Smith	(South Africa)	15.43
3	Josh Kerr	(Australia)	11.77

Heat 2
1	Kelly Slater	(United States)	18.07
2	Michel Bourez	(French Polynesia)	17.67
3	Alejo Muniz	(Brazil)	10.50

Heat 3
1	Julian Wilson	(Australia)	15.43
2	Gabriel Medina	(Brazil)	13.83
3	Filipe Toledo	(Brazil)	13.77

Heat 4
1	Mick Fanning	(Australia)	17.00
2	Wiggolly Dantas	(Brazil)	16.93
3	A. de Souza	(Brazil)	15.27

== Round 5 ==
Heat 1: 1 / Jordy Smith / (South Africa) / 17.37; 2 / Alejo Muniz / (Brazil) / 10.10	Heat 2: 1 / Josh Kerr / (Australia) / 15.30; 2 / Michel Bourez / (French Polynesia) / 14.93	Heat 3: 1 / Gabriel Medina / (Brazil) / 15.03; 2 / A. de Souza / (Brazil) / 12.40	Heat 4: 1 / Filipe Toledo / (Brazil) / 12.50; 2 / Wiggolly Dantas / (Brazil) / 10.27

== Quarter finals ==
Heat 1: 1 / John Florence / (Hawaii) / 10.70; 2 / Jordy Smith / (South Africa) / 10.50	Heat 2: 1 / Josh Kerr / (Australia) / 12.94; 2 / Kelly Slater / (United States) / 11.97	Heat 3: 1 / Julian Wilson / (Australia) / 12.33; 2 / Gabriel Medina / (Brazil) / 11.93	Heat 4: 1 / Mick Fanning / (Australia) / 17.64; 2 / Filipe Toledo / (Brazil) / 16.40

== Semi finals ==
Heat 1: 1 / John Florence / (Hawaii) / 16.50; 2 / Josh Kerr / (Australia) / 14.43	Heat 2: 1 / Mick Fanning / (Australia) / 17.10; 2 / Julian Wilson / (Australia) / 15.17

== Final ==
Heat 1
1	Mick Fanning	(Australia)	17.70
2	John Florence	(Hawaii)	17.13
