= Oi Rio Pro 2016 =

Oi Rio Pro at the Surf
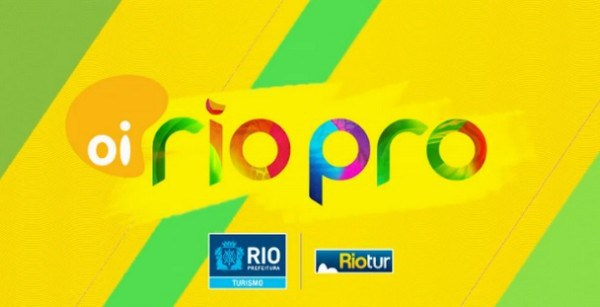
- Location: Rio de Janeiro (BRA)
- Dates: 10 to 21 May
- Competitors: 36 from 7 nations

Medalists
gold medal	John Florence	Hawaii
silver medal	Jack Freestone	Australia

The Oi Rio Pro 2016 was an event of the Association of Surfing Professionals for 2016 ASP World Tour.

This event was held from 10 to 21 May at Rio de Janeiro, (Rio de Janeiro, Brazil) and opposed by 36 surfers.

The tournament was won by John Florence (HAW), who beat Jack Freestone (AUS) in final.

== Round 1 ==
Heat 1
1	Filipe Toledo	(Brazil)	13.77
2	Kanoa Igarashi	(United States)	11.60
3	Dusty Payne	(Hawaii)	11.30

Heat 2
1	L. Fioravanti	(Italy)	14.30
2	Stuart Kennedy	(Australia)	12.93
3	Gabriel Medina	(Brazil)	11.80

Heat 3
1	Davey Cathels	(Australia)	12.00
2	Julian Wilson	(Australia)	9.24
3	Deivid Silva	(Brazil)	7.43

Heat 4
1	Italo Ferreira	(Brazil)	16.50
2	Miguel Pupo	(Brazil)	10.86
3	Bino Lopes	(Brazil)	8.66

Heat 5
1	M. Fernandez	(Brazil)	13.43
2	Jadson Andre	(Brazil)	11.57
3	Matt Wilkinson	(Australia)	8.73

Heat 6
1	Lucas Silveira	(Brazil)	15.84
2	A. de Souza	(Brazil)	13.80
3	Keanu Asing	(Hawaii)	6.74

Heat 7
1	Nat Young	(United States)	15.04
2	Michel Bourez	(French Polynesia)	9.37
3	Alex Ribeiro	(Brazil)	5.83

Heat 8
1	Jordy Smith	(South Africa)	12.37
2	Conner Coffin	(United States)	10.83
3	Jack Freestone	(Australia)	10.70

Heat 9
1	Adan Melling	(Australia)	15.23
2	Jérémy Florès	(France)	15.13
3	Josh Kerr	(Australia)	15.04

Heat 10
1	Ryan Callinan	(Australia)	15.53
2	Wiggolly Dantas	(Brazil)	13.44
3	Kolohe Andino	(United States)	7.67

Heat 11
1	Alejo Muniz	(Brazil)	13.50
2	Adrian Buchan	(Australia)	13.46
3	Sebastian Zietz	(Hawaii)	12.77

Heat 12
1	John Florence	(Hawaii)	11.34
2	Caio Ibelli	(Brazil)	10.84
3	Matt Banting	(Australia)	6.34

== Round 2 ==
Heat 1: 1 / A. de Souza / (Brazil) / 13.00; 2 / Bino Lopes / (Brazil) / 4.96	Heat 2: 1 / Deivid Silva / (Brazil) / 14.73; 2 / Matt Wilkinson / (Australia) / 14.50	Heat 3: 1 / Dusty Payne / (Hawaii) / 13.93; 2 / Julian Wilson / (Australia) / 11.34	Heat 4: 1 / Gabriel Medina / (Brazil) / 19.40; 2 / Alex Ribeiro / (Brazil) / 7.90

Heat 5: 1 / Jack Freestone / (Australia) / 14.57; 2 / Jérémy Florès / (France) / 11.77	Heat 6: 1 / Matt Banting / (Australia) / 14.76; 2 / Kolohe Andino / (United States) / 14.66	Heat 7: 1 / Sebastian Zietz / (Hawaii) / 14.33; 2 / Keanu Asing / (Hawaii) / 11.86	Heat 8: 1 / Caio Ibelli / (Brazil) / 10.83; 2 / Jadson Andre / (Brazil) / 10.67

Heat 9: 1 / Miguel Pupo / (Brazil) / 13.30; 2 / Adrian Buchan / (Australia) / 11.73	Heat 10: 1 / Stuart Kennedy / (Australia) / 14.17; 2 / Wiggolly Dantas / (Brazil) / 11.44	Heat 11: 1 / Kanoa Igarashi / (United States) / 15.33; 2 / Josh Kerr / (Australia) / 13.27	Heat 12: 1 / Michel Bourez / (French Polynesia) / 13.50; 2 / Conner Coffin / (United States) / 11.74

== Round 3 ==
Heat 1: 1 / Filipe Toledo / (Brazil) / 12.67; 2 / L. Fioravanti / (Italy) / 5.00	Heat 2: 1 / John Florence / (Hawaii) / 10.73; 2 / Alejo Muniz / (Brazil) / 7.64	Heat 3: 1 / Dusty Payne / (Hawaii) / 14.63; 2 / Nat Young / (United States) / 10.76	Heat 4: 1 / Caio Ibelli / (Brazil) / 15.07; 2 / Ryan Callinan / (Australia) / 11.13

Heat 5: 1 / Davey Cathels / (Australia) / 8.80; 2 / Stuart Kennedy / (Australia) / 8.74	Heat 6: 1 / A. de Souza / (Brazil) / 13.34; 2 / Lucas Silveira / (Brazil) / 12.76	Heat 7: 1 / Italo Ferreira / (Brazil) / 13.70; 2 / M. Fernandez / (Brazil) / 9.50	Heat 8: 1 / Miguel Pupo / (Brazil) / 13.40; 2 / Kanoa Igarashi / (United States) / 12.80

Heat 9: 1 / Adan Melling / (Australia) / 11.77; 2 / Sebastian Zietz / (Hawaii) / 10.33	Heat 10: 1 / Jack Freestone / (Australia) / 16.07; 2 / Jordy Smith / (South Africa) / 13.77	Heat 11: 1 / Michel Bourez / (French Polynesia) / 16.27; 2 / Matt Banting / (Australia) / 14.00	Heat 12: 1 / Gabriel Medina / (Brazil) / 15.67; 2 / Deivid Silva / (Brazil) / 13.77

== Round 4 ==
Heat 1
1	Dusty Payne	(Hawaii)	15.60
2	John Florence	(Hawaii)	15.20
3	Filipe Toledo	(Brazil)	10.40

Heat 2
1	A. de Souza	(Brazil)	17.44
2	Davey Cathels	(Australia)	8.64
3	Caio Ibelli	(Brazil)	4.57

Heat 3
1	Miguel Pupo	(Brazil)	12.73
2	Italo Ferreira	(Brazil)	12.50
3	Adan Melling	(Australia)	10.90

Heat 4
1	Gabriel Medina	(Brazil)	18.10
2	Michel Bourez	(French Polynesia)	7.90
3	Jack Freestone	(Australia)	7.77

== Round 5 ==
Heat 1: 1 / John Florence / (Hawaii) / 13.00; 2 / Caio Ibelli / (Brazil) / 10.17	Heat 2: 1 / Davey Cathels / (Australia) / 15.67; 2 / Filipe Toledo / (Brazil) / 12.87	Heat 3: 1 / Jack Freestone / (Australia) / 16.43; 2 / Italo Ferreira / (Brazil) / 10.10	Heat 4: 1 / Adan Melling / (Australia) / 10.80; 2 / Michel Bourez / (French Polynesia) / 10.00

== Quarter finals ==
Heat 1: 1 / John Florence / (Hawaii) / 15.17; 2 / Dusty Payne / (Hawaii) / 8.50	Heat 2: 1 / A. de Souza / (Brazil) / 12.77; 2 / Davey Cathels / (Australia) / 10.00	Heat 3: 1 / Jack Freestone / (Australia) / 12.50; 2 / Miguel Pupo / (Brazil) / 11.60	Heat 4: 1 / Gabriel Medina / (Brazil) / 15.77; 2 / Adan Melling / (Australia) / 6.00

== Semi finals ==
Heat 1: 1 / John Florence / (Hawaii) / 18.73; 2 / A. de Souza / (Brazil) / 12.66	Heat 2: 1 / Jack Freestone / (Australia) / 16.50; 2 / Gabriel Medina / (Brazil) / 14.67

== Final ==
Heat 1
1	John Florence	(Hawaii)	18.97
2	Jack Freestone	(Australia)	16.13
