= Fiji Pro 2016 =

Fiji Pro 2016 at the Surf
- Location: Namotu (FJI)
- Dates: 05 to 17 June
- Competitors: 36 from 8 nations

Medalists
| gold medal | Gabriel Medina | Brazil |
| silver medal | Matt Wilkinson | Australia |

The Fiji Pro 2016 was an event of the World Surf League for 2016 World Surf League.

This event was held from 07 to 19 June at Namotu, (Tavarua, Fiji) and opposed by 36 surfers.

The tournament was won by Gabriel Medina (BRA), who beat Matt Wilkinson (AUS) in final.

== Round 1 ==
Heat 1
| 1 | John Florence | (Hawaii) | 10.33 |
| 2 | Alejo Muniz | (Brazil) | 9.33 |
| 3 | Davey Cathels | (Australia) | 8.60 |

Heat 2
| 1 | Filipe Toledo | (Brazil) | 13.76 |
| 2 | Ryan Callinan | (Australia) | 12.56 |
| 3 | Jack Freestone | (Australia) | 9.94 |

Heat 3
| 1 | Jadson Andre | (Brazil) | 14.60 |
| 2 | Stuart Kennedy | (Australia) | 12.67 |
| 3 | Gabriel Medina | (Brazil) | 12.26 |

Heat 4
| 1 | Keanu Asing | (Hawaii) | 13.04 |
| 2 | Matt Wilkinson | (Australia) | 12.56 |
| 3 | Josh Kerr | (Australia) | 10.26 |

Heat 5
| 1 | Miguel Pupo | (Brazil) | 15.23 |
| 2 | Italo Ferreira | (Brazil) | 15.10 |
| 3 | Alex Ribeiro | (Brazil) | 8.63 |

Heat 6
| 1 | A. de Souza | (Brazil) | 11.73 |
| 2 | Tevita Gukilau | (Fiji) | 8.17 |
| 3 | Kanoa Igarashi | (United States) | 4.84 |

Heat 7
| 1 | Matt Banting | (Australia) | 10.34 |
| 2 | Julian Wilson | (Australia) | 9.16 |
| 3 | Conner Coffin | (United States) | 3.57 |

Heat 8
| 1 | Wiggolly Dantas | (Brazil) | 15.60 |
| 2 | Mick Fanning | (Australia) | 11.90 |
| 3 | Kai Otton | (Australia) | 8.47 |

Heat 9
| 1 | Jérémy Florès | (France) | 12.67 |
| 2 | Nat Young | (United States) | 9.70 |
| 3 | Dusty Payne | (Hawaii) | 8.46 |

Heat 10
| 1 | Jordy Smith | (South Africa) | 16.67 |
| 2 | Adrian Buchan | (Australia) | 15.44 |
| 3 | Taj Burrow | (Australia) | 10.44 |

Heat 11
| 1 | Adan Melling | (Australia) | 11.26 |
| 2 | Michel Bourez | (French Polynesia) | 11.14 |
| 3 | Caio Ibelli | (Brazil) | 8.60 |

Heat 12
| 1 | Kelly Slater | (United States) | 16.13 |
| 2 | Kolohe Andino | (United States) | 15.90 |
| 3 | Sebastian Zietz | (Hawaii) | 12.60 |

== Round 2 ==
| Heat 1: 1 / Italo Ferreira / (Brazil) / 10.67; 2 / Tevita Gukilau / (Fiji) / 3.50 | Heat 2: 1 / Matt Wilkinson / (Australia) / 13.10; 2 / Alex Ribeiro / (Brazil) / 11.10 | Heat 3: 1 / Gabriel Medina / (Brazil) / 15.94; 2 / Ryan Callinan / (Australia) / 14.10 | Heat 4: 1 / Alejo Muniz / (Brazil) / 14.00; 2 / Julian Wilson / (Australia) / 11.17 |

| Heat 5: 1 / Mick Fanning / (Australia) / 16.10; 2 / Kai Otton / (Australia) / 14.40 | Heat 6: 1 / Dusty Payne / (Hawaii) / 16.50; 2 / Nat Young / (United States) / 14.67 | Heat 7: 1 / Taj Burrow / (Australia) / 15.30; 2 / Caio Ibelli / (Brazil) / 13.03 | Heat 8: 1 / Kanoa Igarashi / (United States) / 13.17; 2 / Sebastian Zietz / (Hawaii) / 10.53 |

| Heat 9: 1 / Josh Kerr / (Australia) / 15.00; 2 / Kolohe Andino / (United States) / 14.74 | Heat 10: 1 / Michel Bourez / (French Polynesia) / 11.50; 2 / Stuart Kennedy / (Australia) / 8.83 | Heat 11: 1 / Adrian Buchan / (Australia) / 14.84; 2 / Jack Freestone / (Australia) / 13.16 | Heat 12: 1 / Conner Coffin / (United States) / 13.17; 2 / Davey Cathels / (Australia) / 10.16 |

== Round 3 ==
| Heat 1: 1 / Gabriel Medina / (Brazil) / 14.50; 2 / Matt Banting / (Australia) / 4.33 | Heat 2: 1 / Michel Bourez / (French Polynesia) / 10.67; 2 / Kanoa Igarashi / (United States) / 5.46 | Heat 3: 1 / Dusty Payne / (Hawaii) / 7.20; 2 / Filipe Toledo / (Brazil) / 6.50 | Heat 4: 1 / Kelly Slater / (United States) / 16.56; 2 / Jordy Smith / (South Africa) / 11.66 |

| Heat 5: 1 / Wiggolly Dantas / (Brazil) / 6.94; 2 / Conner Coffin / (United States) / 6.83 | Heat 6: 1 / A. de Souza / (Brazil) / 15.27; 2 / Keanu Asing / (Hawaii) / 11.00 | Heat 7: 1 / Jadson Andre / (Brazil) / 14.50; 2 / Italo Ferreira / (Brazil) / 13.73 | Heat 8: 1 / Josh Kerr / (Australia) / 14.26; 2 / Jérémy Florès / (France) / 12.73 |

| Heat 9: 1 / Mick Fanning / (Australia) / 13.40; 2 / Adan Melling / (Australia) / 9.17 | Heat 10: 1 / John Florence / (Hawaii) / 18.76; 2 / Taj Burrow / (Australia) / 18.60 | Heat 11: 1 / Adrian Buchan / (Australia) / 13.54; 2 / Miguel Pupo / (Brazil) / 9.93 | Heat 12: 1 / Matt Wilkinson / (Australia) / 13.93; 2 / Alejo Muniz / (Brazil) / 8.50 |

== Round 4 ==
Heat 1
| 1 | Gabriel Medina | (Brazil) | 14.60 |
| 2 | Dusty Payne | (Hawaii) | 11.16 |
| 3 | Michel Bourez | (French Polynesia) | 10.23 |

Heat 2
| 1 | Kelly Slater | (United States) | 19.77 |
| 2 | Wiggolly Dantas | (Brazil) | 13.34 |
| 3 | A. de Souza | (Brazil) | 11.60 |

Heat 3
| 1 | Mick Fanning | (Australia) | 18.07 |
| 2 | Josh Kerr | (Australia) | 15.07 |
| 3 | Jadson Andre | (Brazil) | 13.43 |

Heat 4
| 1 | Matt Wilkinson | (Australia) | 16.56 |
| 2 | John Florence | (Hawaii) | 16.43 |
| 3 | Adrian Buchan | (Australia) | 15.16 |

== Round 5 ==
| Heat 1: 1 / A. de Souza / (Brazil) / 11.34; 2 / Dusty Payne / (Hawaii) / 10.37 | Heat 2: 1 / Wiggolly Dantas / (Brazil) / 14.27; 2 / Michel Bourez / (French Polynesia) / 3.77 | Heat 3: 1 / Adrian Buchan / (Australia) / 15.67; 2 / Josh Kerr / (Australia) / 10.66 | Heat 4: 1 / John Florence / (Hawaii) / 17.00; 2 / Jadson Andre / (Brazil) / 10.17 |

== Quarter finals ==
| Heat 1: 1 / Gabriel Medina / (Brazil) / 10.86; 2 / A. de Souza / (Brazil) / 8.83 | Heat 2: 1 / Kelly Slater / (United States) / 18.70; 2 / Wiggolly Dantas / (Brazil) / 9.94 | Heat 3: 1 / Adrian Buchan / (Australia) / 14.60; 2 / Mick Fanning / (Australia) / 13.40 | Heat 4: 1 / Matt Wilkinson / (Australia) / 14.63; 2 / John Florence / (Hawaii) / 10.93 |

== Semi finals ==
| Heat 1: 1 / Gabriel Medina / (Brazil) / 14.67; 2 / Kelly Slater / (United States) / 12.03 | Heat 2: 1 / Matt Wilkinson / (Australia) / 13.33; 2 / Adrian Buchan / (Australia) / 12.00 |

== Final ==
Heat 1
| 1 | Gabriel Medina | (Brazil) | 15.60 |
| 2 | Matt Wilkinson | (Australia) | 6.34 |
