= Rip Curl Pro 2016 =

World Surf League event

Surf
- Location: Bells Beach (AUS)
- Dates: 24 March to 7 April
- Competitors: 36 from X nations

Medalists
gold medal	Matt Wilkinson	Australia
silver medal	Jordy Smith	South Africa

The Rip Curl Pro 2016 was an event of the Association of Surfing Professionals for 2016 ASP World Tour.

This event was held from 24 march to 7 April at Bells Beach, (Victoria, Australia) and contested by 36 surfers.

The tournament was won by Matt Wilkinson (AUS), who beat Jordy Smith (ZAF) in final.

== Round 1 ==
Heat 1
1	Davey Cathels	(Australia)	15.20
2	Jérémy Florès	(France)	13.60
3	Caio Ibelli	(Brazil)	10.00

Heat 2
1	Julian Wilson	(Australia)	13.84
2	Stuart Kennedy	(Australia)	11.40
3	Adan Melling	(Australia)	13.57

Heat 3
1	Kanoa Igarashi	(United States)	14.04
2	Dusty Payne	(Hawaii)	12.67
3	Italo Ferreira	(Brazil)	12.46

Heat 4
1	Gabriel Medina	(Brazil)	13.84
2	Conner Coffin	(United States)	11.37
3	Timothee Bisso	(Guadeloupe)	10.53

Heat 5
1	Mick Fanning	(Australia)	16.93
2	Keanu Asing	(Hawaii)	12.77
3	Mason Ho	(Hawaii)	9.76

Heat 6
1	A. de Souza	(Brazil)	11.23
2	Tim Stevenson	(Australia)	10.60
3	Michel Bourez	(French Polynesia)	9.00

Heat 7
1	Kai Otton	(Australia)	13.60
2	Alex Ribeiro	(Brazil)	8.44
3	Kelly Slater	(United States)	7.17

Heat 8
1	Joel Parkinson	(Australia)	15.33
2	Sebastian Zietz	(Hawaii)	13.87
3	Taj Burrow	(Australia)	8.80

Heat 9
1	Matt Wilkinson	(Australia)	13.40
2	Kolohe Andino	(United States)	12.30
3	Miguel Pupo	(Brazil)	12.24

Heat 10
1	Nat Young	(United States)	12.10
2	Adrian Buchan	(Australia)	11.53
3	Ryan Callinan	(Australia)	9.50

Heat 11
1	Wiggolly Dantas	(Brazil)	12.00
2	Matt Banting	(Australia)	11.90
3	Josh Kerr	(Australia)	8.87

Heat 12
1	John Florence	(Hawaii)	14.50
2	Jordy Smith	(South Africa)	11.10
3	Jadson Andre	(Brazil)	9.10

== Round 2 ==
Heat 1: 1 / Italo Ferreira / (Brazil) / 13.43; 2 / Tim Stevenson / (Australia) / 11.67	Heat 2: 1 / Mason Ho / (Hawaii) / 10.64; 2 / Jérémy Florès / (France) / 9.80	Heat 3: 1 / Kelly Slater / (United States) / 12.90; 2 / Timothee Bisso / (Guadeloupe) / 10.50	Heat 4: 1 / Dusty Payne / (Hawaii) / 13.84; 2 / Josh Kerr / (Australia) / 12.94

Heat 5: 1 / Jordy Smith / (South Africa) / 15.87; 2 / Adan Melling / (Australia) / 14.50	Heat 6: 1 / Adrian Buchan / (Australia) / 14.23; 2 / Alex Ribeiro / (Brazil) / 5.27	Heat 7: 1 / Sebastian Zietz / (Hawaii) / 13.94; 2 / Kolohe Andino / (United States) / 13.84	Heat 8: 1 / Miguel Pupo / (Brazil) / 15.10; 2 / Taj Burrow / (Australia) / 15.00

Heat 9: 1 / Caio Ibelli / (Brazil) / 16.83; 2 / Ryan Callinan / (Australia) / 16.43	Heat 10: 1 / Stuart Kennedy / (Australia) / 13.20; 2 / Matt Banting / (Australia) / 10.57	Heat 11: 1 / Conner Coffin / (United States) / 14.53; 2 / Jadson Andre / (Brazil) / 14.20	Heat 12: 3 / Michel Bourez / (French Polynesia) / 16.77; 2 / Keanu Asing / (Hawaii) / 13.23

== Round 3 ==
Heat 1: 1 / Italo Ferreira / (Brazil) / 17.00; 1 / Sebastian Zietz / (Hawaii) / 15.83	Heat 2: 1 / Nat Young / (United States) / 13.50; 2 / Stuart Kennedy / (Australia) / 7.67	Heat 3: 1 / Julian Wilson / (Australia) / 12.44; 2 / Miguel Pupo / (Brazil) / 9.67	Heat 4: 1 / Matt Wilkinson / (Australia) / 15.47; 2 / Kanoa Igarashi / (United States) / 8.37

Heat 5: 1 / Wiggolly Dantas / (Brazil) / 13.37; 2 / Adrian Buchan / (Australia) / 12.60	Heat 6: 1 / Mason Ho / (Hawaii) / 15.10; 2 / A. de Souza / (Brazil) / 14.33	Heat 7: 1 / Mick Fanning / (Australia) / 16.60; 2 / Dusty Payne / (Hawaii) / 11.57	Heat 8: 1 / Jordy Smith / (South Africa) / 15.33; 2 / Kai Otton / (Australia) / 13.26

Heat 9: 1 / Conner Coffin / (United States) / 16.27; 2 / Joel Parkinson / (Australia) / 14.56	Heat 10: 1 / Michel Bourez / (French Polynesia) / 14.83; 2 / Kelly Slater / (United States) / 13.70	Heat 11: 1 / Caio Ibelli / (Brazil) / 15.54; 2 / John Florence / (Hawaii) / 15.50	Heat 12: 1 / Davey Cathels / (Australia) / 15.40; 2 / Gabriel Medina / (Brazil) / 12.07

== Round 4 ==
Heat 1
1	Italo Ferreira	(Brazil)	14.00
2	Nat Young	(United States)	10.93
3	Julian Wilson	(Australia)	8.60

Heat 2
1	Wiggolly Dantas	(Brazil)	15.37
2	Matt Wilkinson	(Australia)	12.20
3	Mason Ho	(Hawaii)	10.93

Heat 3
1	Conner Coffin	(United States)	16.86
2	Mick Fanning	(Australia)	15.44
3	Jordy Smith	(South Africa)	15.30

Heat 4
1	Michel Bourez	(French Polynesia)	13.36
2	Caio Ibelli	(Brazil)	8.00
3	Davey Cathels	(Australia)	6.43

== Round 5 ==
Heat 1: 1 / Nat Young / (United States) / 16.83; 2 / Mason Ho / (Hawaii) / 11.67	Heat 2: 1 / Matt Wilkinson / (Australia) / 16.57; 2 / Julian Wilson / (Australia) / 16.57	Heat 3: 1 / Mick Fanning / (Australia) / 14.50; 2 / Davey Cathels / (Australia) / 6.33	Heat 4: 1 / Jordy Smith / (South Africa) / 16.80; 2 / Caio Ibelli / (Brazil) / 16.33

== Quarter finals ==
Heat 1: 1 / Italo Ferreira / (Brazil) / 15.30; 2 / Nat Young / (United States) / 12.33	Heat 2: 1 / Matt Wilkinson / (Australia) / 13.26; 2 / Wiggolly Dantas / (Brazil) / 12.00	Heat 3: 1 / Mick Fanning / (Australia) / 16.90; 2 / Conner Coffin / (United States) / 16.17	Heat 4: 1 / Jordy Smith / (South Africa) / 17.77; 2 / Michel Bourez / (French Polynesia) / 17.26

== Semi finals ==
Heat 1: 1 / Matt Wilkinson / (Australia) / 17.27; 2 / Italo Ferreira / (Brazil) / 12.40	Heat 2: 1 / Jordy Smith / (South Africa) / 17.17; 2 / Mick Fanning / (Australia) / 13.90

== Final ==
Heat 1
1	Matt Wilkinson	(Australia)	17.37
2	Jordy Smith	(South Africa)	14.16
