= Margaret River Pro 2016 =

Surf
- Location: Margaret River (AUS)
- Dates: 8 to 19 April
- Competitors: 36 from 8 nations

Medalists
gold medal	Sebastian Zietz	Hawaii
silver medal	Julian Wilson	Australia

The Margaret River Pro 2016 was an event of the Association of Surfing Professionals for 2016 World Surf League.

This event was held from 15 to 26 April at Margaret River, Western Australia and contested by 36 surfers.

The tournament was won by Sebastian Zietz (HAW), who beat Julian Wilson (AUS) in final.

== Round 1 ==
Heat 1
1	Taj Burrow	(Australia)	16.34
2	Jérémy Florès	(France)	16.10
3	Alex Ribeiro	(Brazil)	5.43

Heat 2
1	Julian Wilson	(Australia)	17.10
2	Adan Melling	(Australia)	15.47
3	Kai Otton	(Australia)	12.06

Heat 3
1	Matt Wilkinson	(Australia)	12.67
2	Stuart Kennedy	(Australia)	9.17
3	Dusty Payne	(Hawaii)	7.60

Heat 4
1	Italo Ferreira	(Brazil)	15.76
2	Kanoa Igarashi	(United States)	14.54
3	Jack Robinson	(Australia)	9.70

Heat 5
1	Gabriel Medina	(Brazil)	16.70
2	L. Fioravanti	(Italy)	12.27
3	Davey Cathels	(Australia)	10.16

Heat 6
1	A. de Souza	(Brazil)	13.10
2	Jacob Willcox	(Australia)	12.40
3	Keanu Asing	(Hawaii)	10.64

Heat 7
1	Michel Bourez	(French Polynesia)	14.17
2	Jordy Smith	(South Africa)	14.04
3	Alejo Muniz	(Brazil)	13.13

Heat 8
1	Nat Young	(United States)	15.93
2	Matt Banting	(Australia)	15.53
3	Caio Ibelli	(Brazil)	14.60

Heat 9
1	Joel Parkinson	(Australia)	12.84
2	Conner Coffin	(United States)	11.26
3	Ryan Callinan	(Australia)	10.50

Heat 10
1	Kolohe Andino	(United States)	15.70
2	Kelly Slater	(United States)	12.16
3	Miguel Pupo	(Brazil)	5.10

Heat 11
1	Josh Kerr	(Australia)	14.93
2	Wiggolly Dantas	(Brazil)	14.50
3	Jay Davies	(Australia)	9.50

Heat 12
1	John Florence	(Hawaii)	18.87
2	Adrian Buchan	(Australia)	15.27
3	Sebastian Zietz	(Hawaii)	13.20

== Round 2 ==
Heat 1: 1 / Jérémy Florès / (France) / 14.80; 2 / Jay Davies / (Australia) / 14.60	Heat 2: 1 / Jordy Smith / (South Africa) / 15.94; 2 / Jacob Willcox / (Australia) / 13.73	Heat 3: 1 / L. Fioravanti / (Italy) / 16.60; 2 / Kelly Slater / (United States) / 13.43	Heat 4: 1 / Wiggolly Dantas / (Brazil) / 18.06; 2 / Jack Robinson / (Australia) / 14.37

Heat 5: 1 / Adrian Buchan / (Australia) / 18.00; 2 / Dusty Payne / (Hawaii) / 17.93	Heat 6: 1 / Adan Melling / (Australia) / 13.84; 2 / Conner Coffin / (United States) / 12.63	Heat 7: 1 / Caio Ibelli / (Brazil) / 14.74; 2 / Alex Ribeiro / (Brazil) / 12.83	Heat 8: 1 / Alejo Muniz / (Brazil) / 12.23; 2 / Kai Otton / (Australia) / 10.57

Heat 9: 1 / Matt Banting / (Australia) / 14.90; 2 / Stuart Kennedy / (Australia) / 13.30	Heat 10: 1 / Kanoa Igarashi / (United States) / 14.23; 2 / Ryan Callinan / (Australia) / 13.64	Heat 11: 1 / Miguel Pupo / (Brazil) / 14.50; 2 / Davey Cathels / (Australia) / 13.33	Heat 12: 1 / Sebastian Zietz / (Hawaii) / 15.40; 2 / Keanu Asing / (Hawaii) / 13.00

== Round 3 ==
Heat 1: 1 / Matt Wilkinson / (Australia) / 12.00; 2 / Matt Banting / (Australia) / 9.27	Heat 2: 1 / Joel Parkinson / (Australia) / 17.40; 2 / Michel Bourez / (French Polynesia) / 11.70	Heat 3: 1 / Julian Wilson / (Australia) / 16.90; 2 / Miguel Pupo / (Brazil) / 9.80	Heat 4: 1 / Nat Young / (United States) / 18.10; 2 / Taj Burrow / (Australia) / 14.77

Heat 5: 1 / Adrian Buchan / (Australia) / 15.50; 2 / Josh Kerr / (Australia) / 12.90	Heat 6: 1 / L. Fioravanti / (Italy) / 15.60; 2 / A. de Souza / (Brazil) / 15.50	Heat 7: 1 / Gabriel Medina / (Brazil) / 14.67; 2 / Adan Melling / (Australia) / 13.10	Heat 8: 1 / Kolohe Andino / (United States) / 16.10; 2 / Wiggolly Dantas / (Brazil) / 11.20

Heat 9: 1 / Jordy Smith / (South Africa) / 18.54; 2 / Kanoa Igarashi / (United States) / 14.16	Heat 10: 1 / Sebastian Zietz / (Hawaii) / 17.73; 2 / Jérémy Florès / (France) / 16.20	Heat 11: 1 / Caio Ibelli / (Brazil) / 16.27; 2 / John Florence / (Hawaii) / 15.54	Heat 12: 1 / Italo Ferreira / (Brazil) / 12.43; 2 / Alejo Muniz / (Brazil) / 8.23

== Round 4 ==
Heat 1
1	Joel Parkinson	(Australia)	13.10
2	Matt Wilkinson	(Australia)	12.93
3	Julian Wilson	(Australia)	12.43

Heat 2
1	L. Fioravanti	(Italy)	11.97
2	Adrian Buchan	(Australia)	11.87
3	Nat Young	(United States)	11.60

Heat 3
1	Kolohe Andino	(United States)	14.20
2	Gabriel Medina	(Brazil)	12.00
3	Jordy Smith	(South Africa)	12.00

Heat 4
1	Sebastian Zietz	(Hawaii)	14.17
2	Caio Ibelli	(Brazil)	12.57
3	Italo Ferreira	(Brazil)	12.56

== Round 5 ==
Heat 1: 1 / Nat Young / (United States) / 15.37; 2 / Matt Wilkinson / (Australia) / 8.83	Heat 2: 1 / Julian Wilson / (Australia) / 14.17; 2 / Adrian Buchan / (Australia) / 10.26	Heat 3: 1 / Italo Ferreira / (Brazil) / 15.93; 2 / Gabriel Medina / (Brazil) / 13.17	Heat 4: 1 / Caio Ibelli / (Brazil) / 13.03; 2 / Jordy Smith / (South Africa) / 10.83

== Quarter finals ==
Heat 1: 1 / Joel Parkinson / (Australia) / 15.83; 2 / Nat Young / (United States) / 14.24	Heat 2: 1 / Julian Wilson / (Australia) / 18.17; 2 / L. Fioravanti / (Italy) / 13.10	Heat 3: 1 / Italo Ferreira / (Brazil) / 17.96; 2 / Kolohe Andino / (United States) / 12.50	Heat 4: 1 / Sebastian Zietz / (Hawaii) / 12.50; 2 / Caio Ibelli / (Brazil) / 9.93

== Semi finals ==
Heat 1: 1 / Julian Wilson / (Australia) / 16.60; 2 / Joel Parkinson / (Australia) / 15.50	Heat 2: 1 / Sebastian Zietz / (Hawaii) / 16.27; 2 / Italo Ferreira / (Brazil) / 13.17

== Final ==
Heat 1
1	Sebastian Zietz	(Hawaii)	17.40
2	Julian Wilson	(Australia)	16.67
