= Quiksilver Pro Gold Coast 2016 =

Quiksilver Pro Gold Coast at the Surf
- Location: Gold Coast (AUS)
- Dates: 10 to 21 March
- Competitors: 36 from 7 nations

Medalists
gold medal	Matt Wilkinson	Australia
silver medal	Kolohe Andino	United States

The Quiksilver Pro Gold Coast 2016 was an event of the Association of Surfing Professionals for 2016 World Surf League.

This event was held from 10 to 21 March at Gold Coast, (Queensland, Australia) and contested by 36 surfers.

The tournament was won by Matt Wilkinson (AUS), who beat Kolohe Andino (USA) in final.

== Round 1 ==
Heat 1
1	Italo Ferreira	(Brazil)	12.00
2	Ryan Callinan	(Australia)	11.10
3	Keanu Asing	(Hawaii)	8.80

Heat 2
1	Michel Bourez	(French Polynesia)	11.50
2	Adan Melling	(Australia)	10.37
3	Julian Wilson	(Australia)	6.06

Heat 3
1	Filipe Toledo	(Brazil)	14.36
2	Jadson Andre	(Brazil)	13.30
3	Stuart Kennedy	(Australia)	10.67

Heat 4
1	Gabriel Medina	(Brazil)	16.17
2	Sebastian Zietz	(Hawaii)	14.80
3	Caio Ibelli	(Brazil)	8.10

Heat 5
1	Mick Fanning	(Australia)	17.24
2	W. Carmichael	(Australia)	16.00
3	Matt Banting	(Australia)	9.90

Heat 6
1	Mikey Wright	(Australia)	13.74
2	A. de Souza	(Brazil)	13.70
3	Kolohe Andino	(United States)	9.10

Heat 7
1	Jérémy Florès	(France)	15.90
2	Davey Cathels	(Australia)	15.00
3	Adrian Buchan	(Australia)	10.74

Heat 8
1	Matt Wilkinson	(Australia)	17.00
2	Kelly Slater	(United States)	13.67
3	Conner Coffin	(United States)	12.17

Heat 9
1	Nat Young	(United States)	12.87
2	Alex Ribeiro	(Brazil)	12.14
3	Kai Otton	(Australia)	11.50

Heat 10
1	Taj Burrow	(Australia)	15.40
2	Josh Kerr	(Australia)	12.26
3	Kanoa Igarashi	(United States)	11.40

Heat 11
1	Wiggolly Dantas	(Brazil)	17.26
2	Jordy Smith	(South Africa)	13.43
3	Miguel Pupo	(Brazil)	12.47

Heat 12
1	Joel Parkinson	(Australia)	14.10
2	John Florence	(Hawaii)	13.56
3	Jack Freestone	(Australia)	13.44

== Round 2 ==
Heat 1: 1 / A. de Souza / (Brazil) / 15.30; 2 / W. Carmichael / (Australia) / 11.00	Heat 2: 1 / Sebastian Zietz / (Hawaii) / 13.10; 2 / Julian Wilson / (Australia) / 11.87	Heat 3: 1 / Stuart Kennedy / (Australia) / 15.73; 2 / Kelly Slater / (United States) / 13.10	Heat 4: 1 / Josh Kerr / (Australia) / 13.50; 2 / Adan Melling / (Australia) / 10.83

Heat 5: 1 / Ryan Callinan / (Australia) / 15.74; 2 / Jordy Smith / (South Africa) / 12.00	Heat 6: 1 / John Florence / (Hawaii) / 14.36; 2 / Davey Cathels / (Australia) / 12.66	Heat 7: 1 / Conner Coffin / (United States) / 13.33; 2 / Kai Otton / (Australia) / 13.16	Heat 8: 1 / Adrian Buchan / (Australia) / 15.37; 2 / Alex Ribeiro / (Brazil) / 13.47

Heat 9: 1 / Kanoa Igarashi / (United States) / 12.27; 2 / Keanu Asing / (Hawaii) / 12.26	Heat 10: 1 / Jadson Andre / (Brazil) / 11.43; 3 / Miguel Pupo / (Brazil) / 9.07	Heat 11: 1 / Caio Ibelli / (Brazil) / 12.17; 2 / Jack Freestone / (Australia) / 10.80	Heat 12: 1 / Kolohe Andino / (United States) / 13.97; 2 / Matt Banting / (Australia) / 12.23

== Round 3 ==
Heat 1: 1 / Filipe Toledo / (Brazil) / 16.60; 2 / Ryan Callinan / (Australia) / 5.00	Heat 2: 1 / Joel Parkinson / (Australia) / 14.83; 2 / Jadson Andre / (Brazil) / 13.66	Heat 3: 1 / Conner Coffin / (United States) / 14.04; 2 / Italo Ferreira / (Brazil) / 13.83	Heat 4: 1 / Caio Ibelli / (Brazil) / 11.83; 2 / Josh Kerr / (Australia) / 7.60

Heat 5: 1 / Matt Wilkinson / (Australia) / 12.40; 2 / Taj Burrow / (Australia) / 12.07	Heat 6: 1 / A. de Souza / (Brazil) / 16.17; 2 / Mikey Wright / (Australia) / 14.04	Heat 7: 1 / Sebastian Zietz / (Hawaii) / 14.50; 2 / Mick Fanning / (Australia) / 12.50	Heat 8: 1 / Adrian Buchan / (Australia) / 15.43; 2 / Wiggolly Dantas / (Brazil) / 13.70

Heat 9: 1 / Kolohe Andino / (United States) / 16.80; 2 / Nat Young / (United States) / 15.53	Heat 10: 1 / Kanoa Igarashi / (United States) / 13.30; 2 / Jérémy Florès / (France) / 12.83	Heat 11: 1 / John Florence / (Hawaii) / 15.90; 2 / Michel Bourez / (French Polynesia) / 11.84	Heat 12: 1 / Stuart Kennedy / (Australia) / 16.80; 2 / Gabriel Medina / (Brazil) / 16.53

== Round 4 ==
Heat 1
1	Filipe Toledo	(Brazil)	19.20
2	Joel Parkinson	(Australia)	15.43
3	Conner Coffin	(United States)	11.53

Heat 2
1	Matt Wilkinson	(Australia)	14.10
2	A. de Souza	(Brazil)	11.80
3	Caio Ibelli	(Brazil)	10.50

Heat 3
1	Kolohe Andino	(United States)	16.10
2	Adrian Buchan	(Australia)	15.74
3	Sebastian Zietz	(Hawaii)	15.33

Heat 4
1	John Florence	(Hawaii)	11.90
2	Stuart Kennedy	(Australia)	11.43
3	Kanoa Igarashi	(United States)	4.74

== Round 5 ==
Heat 1: 1 / Joel Parkinson / (Australia) / 16.07; 2 / Caio Ibelli / (Brazil) / 12.66	Heat 2: 1 / A. de Souza / (Brazil) / 13.76; 2 / Conner Coffin / (United States) / 12.77	Heat 3: 1 / Adrian Buchan / (Australia) / 16.04; 2 / Kanoa Igarashi / (United States) / 9.87	Heat 4: 1 / Stuart Kennedy / (Australia) / 17.67; 2 / Sebastian Zietz / (Hawaii) / 10.77

== Quarter finals ==
Heat 1: 1 / Filipe Toledo / (Brazil) / 12.34; 2 / Joel Parkinson / (Australia) / 12.16	Heat 2: 1 / Matt Wilkinson / (Australia) / 13.16; 2 / A. de Souza / (Brazil) / 12.73	Heat 3: 1 / Kolohe Andino / (United States) / 16.00; 2 / Adrian Buchan / (Australia) / 4.63	Heat 4: 1 / Stuart Kennedy / (Australia) / 15.23; 2 / John Florence / (Hawaii) / 14.00

== Semi finals ==
Heat 1: 1 / Matt Wilkinson / (Australia) / 14.43; 2 / Filipe Toledo / (Brazil) / 13.27	Heat 2: 1 / Kolohe Andino / (United States) / 14.23; 2 / Stuart Kennedy / (Australia) / 14.20

== Final ==
Heat 1
1	Matt Wilkinson	(Australia)	14.20
2	Kolohe Andino	(United States)	13.66
