= Oi Rio Pro 2015 =

Oi Rio Pro at the Surf
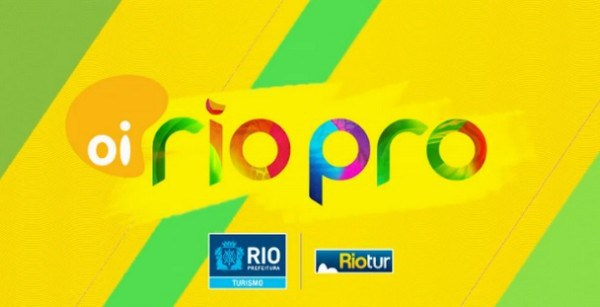
- Location: Rio de Janeiro (BRA)
- Dates: 11 to 17 May
- Competitors: 36 from 7 nations

Medalists
gold medal	Filipe Toledo	Brazil
silver medal	Bede Durbidge	Australia

The Oi Rio Pro 2015 was an event on the 2015 ASP World Tour, organized by the Association of Surfing Professionals (ASP).

The competition took place from 11 to 17 May 2015 in Rio de Janeiro, Brazil, featuring 36 professional surfers.

The tournament was won by Filipe Toledo (BRA), who defeated Bede Durbidge (AUS) in the final.

== Round 1 ==
Heat 1
1	Jérémy Florès	(France)	12.17
2	Brett Simpson	(United States)	12.07
3	Taj Burrow	(Australia)	6.30

Heat 2
1	Kelly Slater	(United States)	19.27
2	Adrian Buchan	(Australia)	12.06
3	Ricardo Christie	(New Zealand)	11.76

Heat 3
1	Wiggolly Dantas	(Brazil)	15.97
2	John Florence	(Hawaii)	10.66
3	C. J. Hobgood	(United States)	9.94

Heat 4
1	Gabriel Medina	(Brazil)	12.33
2	F. Patacchia	(Hawaii)	7.77
3	Alejo Muniz	(Brazil)	4.90

Heat 5
1	Italo Ferreira	(Brazil)	14.07
2	Mick Fanning	(Australia)	9.33
3	Alex Ribeiro	(Brazil)	2.47

Heat 6
1	A. de Souza	(Brazil)	17.90
2	Kai Otton	(Australia)	11.60
3	David do Carmo	(Brazil)	5.67

Heat 7
1	Jadson Andre	(Brazil)	14.04
2	Josh Kerr	(Australia)	11.97
3	Dusty Payne	(Hawaii)	10.03

Heat 8
1	Sebastian Zietz	(Hawaii)	12.06
2	Jordy Smith	(South Africa)	10.67
3	Keanu Asing	(Hawaii)	10.60

Heat 9
1	Bede Durbidge	(Australia)	14.94
2	Glenn Hall	(Republic of Ireland)	11.84
3	Nat Young	(United States)	6.17

Heat 10
1	Filipe Toledo	(Brazil)	16.27
2	Kolohe Andino	(United States)	11.93
3	Adan Melling	(Australia)	8.40

Heat 11
1	Matt Banting	(Australia)	9.76
2	Miguel Pupo	(Brazil)	9.26
3	Julian Wilson	(Australia)	9.10

Heat 12
1	Matt Wilkinson	(Australia)	14.96
2	Joel Parkinson	(Australia)	13.47
3	Owen Wright	(Australia)	10.34

== Round 2 ==
Heat 1: 1 / Mick Fanning / (Australia) / 16.63; 2 / David do Carmo / (Brazil) / 7.94	Heat 2: 1 / John Florence / (Hawaii) / 14.84; 2 / Alex Ribeiro / (Brazil) / 10.83	Heat 3: 1 / Taj Burrow / (Australia) / 10.74; 2 / Alejo Muniz / (Brazil) / 10.20	Heat 4: 1 / Josh Kerr / (Australia) / 9.27; 2 / C. J. Hobgood / (United States) / 5.40

Heat 5: 1 / Ricardo Christie / (New Zealand) / 13.27; 2 / Jordy Smith / (South Africa) / 12.03	Heat 6: 1 / Nat Young / (United States) / 11.77; 2 / Brett Simpson / (United States) / 7.84	Heat 7: 1 / Dusty Payne / (Hawaii) / 9.23; 2 / Julian Wilson / (Australia) / 8.00	Heat 8: 1 / Keanu Asing / (Hawaii) / 9.60; 2 / Joel Parkinson / (Australia) / 9.50

Heat 9: 1 / Owen Wright / (Australia) / 14.77; 2 / Glenn Hall / (Republic of Ireland) / 5.90	Heat 10: 1 / Adan Melling / (Australia) / 14.10; 2 / Miguel Pupo / (Brazil) / 11.67	Heat 11: 1 / Kai Otton / (Australia) / 12.60; 2 / Kolohe Andino / (United States) / 11.10	Heat 12: 1 / Adrian Buchan / (Australia) / 11.33; 2 / F. Patacchia / (Hawaii) / 9.03

== Round 3 ==
Heat 1: 1 / John Florence / (Hawaii) / 18.77; 2 / Adan Melling / (Australia) / 12.67	Heat 2: 1 / Filipe Toledo / (Brazil) / 15.60; 2 / Wiggolly Dantas / (Brazil) / 11.34	Heat 3: 1 / Matt Banting / (Australia) / 10.80; 2 / Kelly Slater / (United States) / 6.70	Heat 4: 1 / Italo Ferreira / (Brazil) / 15.50; 2 / Nat Young / (United States) / 11.00

Heat 5: 1 / Jadson Andre / (Brazil) / 14.50; 2 / Sebastian Zietz / (Hawaii) / 9.90	Heat 6: 1 / Ricardo Christie / (New Zealand) / 16.57; 2 / A. de Souza / (Brazil) / 13.90	Heat 7: 1 / Mick Fanning / (Australia) / 11.46; 2 / Dusty Payne / (Hawaii) / 10.80	Heat 8: 1 / Bede Durbidge / (Australia) / 12.73; 2 / Jérémy Florès / (France) / 10.77

Heat 9: 1 / Josh Kerr / (Australia) / 12.34; 2 / Kai Otton / (Australia) / 7.86	Heat 10: 1 / Matt Wilkinson / (Australia) / 15.60; 2 / Taj Burrow / (Australia) / 11.94	Heat 11: 1 / Owen Wright / (Australia) / 13.50; 2 / Adrian Buchan / (Australia) / 8.06	Heat 12: 1 / Keanu Asing / (Hawaii) / 14.17; 2 / Gabriel Medina / (Brazil) / 13.60

== Round 4 ==
Heat 1
1	Filipe Toledo	(Brazil)	17.83
2	Matt Banting	(Australia)	13.57
3	John Florence	(Hawaii)	7.74

Heat 2
1	Jadson Andre	(Brazil)	12.63
2	Italo Ferreira	(Brazil)	11.93
3	Ricardo Christie	(New Zealand)	10.10

Heat 3
1	Josh Kerr	(Australia)	13.03
2	Bede Durbidge	(Australia)	9.33
3	Mick Fanning	(Australia)	8.76

Heat 4
1	Matt Wilkinson	(Australia)	12.74
2	Owen Wright	(Australia)	12.23
3	Keanu Asing	(Hawaii)	10.37

== Round 5 ==
Heat 1: 1 / Ricardo Christie / (New Zealand) / 13.50; 2 / Matt Banting / (Australia) / 13.27	Heat 2: 1 / Italo Ferreira / (Brazil) / 15.73; 2 / John Florence / (Hawaii) / 4.87	Heat 3: 1 / Bede Durbidge / (Australia) / 13.67; 2 / Keanu Asing / (Hawaii) / 5.20	Heat 4: 1 / Owen Wright / (Australia) / 14.40; 2 / Mick Fanning / (Australia) / 9.60

== Quarter finals ==
Heat 1: 1 / Filipe Toledo / (Brazil) / 15.00; 2 / Ricardo Christie / (New Zealand) / 11.50	Heat 2: 1 / Italo Ferreira / (Brazil) / 14.30; 2 / Jadson Andre / (Brazil) / 13.74	Heat 3: 1 / Bede Durbidge / (Australia) / 14.30; 2 / Josh Kerr / (Australia) / 11.20	Heat 4: 1 / Matt Wilkinson / (Australia) / 13.76; 2 / Owen Wright / (Australia) / 11.30

== Semi finals ==
Heat 1: 1 / Filipe Toledo / (Brazil) / 15.93; 2 / Italo Ferreira / (Brazil) / 6.34	Heat 2: 1 / Bede Durbidge / (Australia) / 14.63; 2 / Matt Wilkinson / (Australia) / 8.23

== Final ==
Heat 1
Filipe Toledo	(Brazil)	19.87
Bede Durbidge	(Australia)	14.70
