= Ítalo Ferreira =

Brazilian surfer (born 1994)

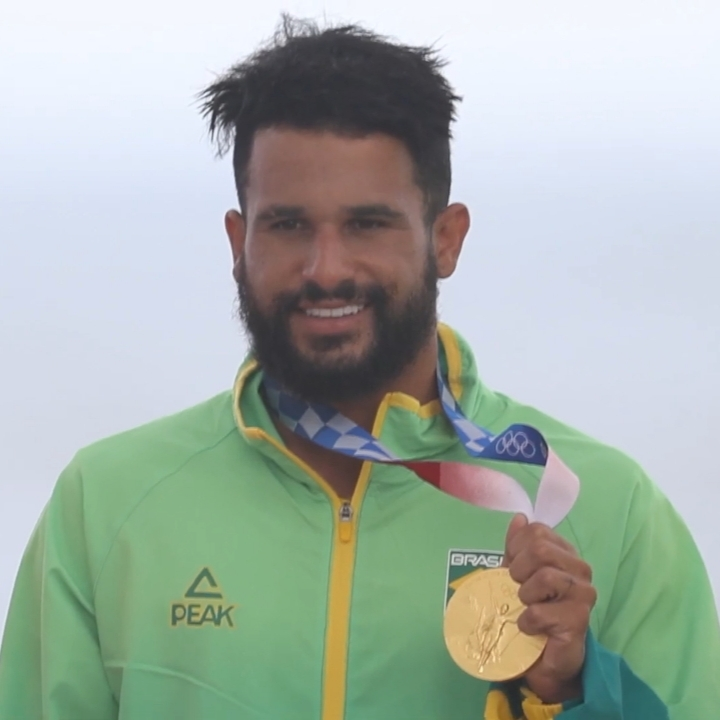
- Ferreira holding his gold medal at the 2020 Summer Olympics

Personal information
- Full name: Ítalo Ferreira da Costa
- Born: 6 May 1994 (age 32) Baía Formosa, Rio Grande do Norte, Brazil
- Height: 5 ft 6 in (168 cm)
- Weight: 149 lb (68 kg)

Surfing career
- Sport: Surfing
- Best year: 1st: 2019 - WSL World Champion
- Sponsors: Billabong, Red Bull, Oakley, Bridgestone, Ford, T. Patterson Surfboards, Creatures of Leisure, Surf Fins, The Box SM, Silver Surf Surfboards
- Major achievements: 2020 Olympics Gold Medal; 2019 World Surf League Champion; WSL Championship Tour event wins: 11; 2015 WSL Rookie of the Year; 2019 ISA World Surfing Games Champion; Surfers' Hall of Fame inductee

Surfing specifications
- Stance: Goofy
Medal record
Men's surfing
Representing Brazil
Olympic Games
Gold medal – first place	2020 Tokyo	Shortboard
World Games
Gold medal – first place	2019 Miyazaki	Men
Gold medal – first place	2019 Miyazaki	Team

Ítalo Ferreira da Costa (born 6 May 1994) is a Brazilian professional surfer hailing from a small community of Baía Formosa, in Rio Grande do Norte on the northeastern coast of Brazil.

== Early life ==
Ferreira learned to surf on a three-foot-long lid of a coolbox his father used to transport fish to sell to restaurants in Baia Formosa. He quickly progressed to a real board and at 12 years of age, his talent was noticed and then nurtured by fellow surfer Jadson Andre and the legendary Brazilian surf coach, Luiz 'Pinga' Campos, who was then marketing director of one of the world's leading surf brands.

== Career ==
Soon after, Ítalo won two rounds of the Junior World Championship in 2011 (finishing runner-up in the category overall), won the Brazilian Championship and in 2014, he finally qualified for the World Championship Tour.

Ferreira first gained notoriety on the Championship Tour during his 2015 rookie season. During his breakout year, he made the semifinals in Rio and the quarterfinals in Fiji, Tahiti, and France before making his first CT Final in Portugal. Italo won the Rookie of the Year award after finishing his year 7th in the rankings. However, his rookie season was followed by a few inconsistent seasons. He had bright spots in 2016 with semifinal appearances at Bells and Margaret River but was stopped in round five seven times, finishing the year 15th in the rankings. He looked on track to rebound in 2017 after a strong fifth-place finish at Snapper, but two days after the event, he tore ligaments in his ankle, and he missed the next three stops. Eventually, he finished 22nd in the rankings. He bounced back almost immediately in 2018, with event wins at Bells, Keramas, and Supertubos, finishing the season 4th in the rankings. In 2019, Ítalo started by winning the first tour stop of the year on the Australian Gold Coast. Later, he also won the inaugural Red Bull Airborne event. He would continue the season with a victory at MEO Pro Portugal and final runner-up finishes at the J-Bay Open and Quicksilver Pro France. The final event of the year was at the Pipe Masters, where Ítalo contested the title with his compatriot Gabriel Medina in the finals, eventually winning the event, and becoming World Surfing Champion for the first time in his career

On July, 27th, 2021, Ferreira won the first men's Olympic surfing gold medal in the 2020 Tokyo Summer Olympics. On 4 August 2023, Ferreira became the first Brazilian born surfer to be inducted into the Surfers' Hall of Fame.

Italo started the 2021 season as the reigning world champion, due to the 2020 season being paused due to COVID-19, he was a semi-finalist in the first stage of the year at Pipeline and won the second stage of the year, the Rip Curl Newcastle Cup in Australia. He finished the regular season in second place, securing a spot in the WSL Finals 2021. In Match 3 he was defeated by compatriot Filipe Toledo and finished the season in 3rd place.

In the 2022 season, his best results were 3 semifinals. He finished the regular season in 4th place, securing a spot in the WSL Finals again. He had a great campaign, winning the first 3 matches and reaching the title match. He faced Toledo for the second year in a row. Italo lost the first 2 Rounds and finished the season as world runner-up.

In the 2023 season, Ítalo started the season poorly, achieving enough results to escape the mid-season cut. In the sixth stage, at the Surf Ranch Pro Ítalo made his only final of the season, losing to Griffin Colapinto in a very controversial title match. He finished the season in 13th place, his worst season since 2017.

In the 2024 season, Ítalo started slowly again, passing the mid-season cut. In the sixth stage of the year, Ítalo won his first stop since 2021. He won the SHISEIDO Tahiti Pro against John John Florence for the first time in his career. He also won the VIVO Rio Pro for the first time, beating Yago Dora in the final. He finished the regular season in 5th place, going to the WSL Finals for the third time. He had another great campaign, winning 3 matches and reaching the title match against John John. In the final he lost two rounds and ended the season for the second time in his career as world runner-up.

Italo started the 2025 season very well, making the semi-finals at Pipe and winning the first event in the history of the WSL in the Middle East, the Surf Abu Dhabi Pro in the United Arab Emirates wave pool, beating Rio Waida in the final.

== Career victories ==
WCT Wins
Year	Event	Venue	Country
2026	Corona Cero New Zealand	Raglan, New Zealand	New Zealand
2025	Surf Abu Dhabi Pro	Hudayriat Island, Abu Dhabi	United Arab Emirates
2024	VIVO Rio Pro	Saquarema, Rio de Janeiro	Brazil
2024	SHISEIDO Tahiti Pro	Teahupo'o, Tahiti	French Polynesia
2021	Rip Curl Newcastle Cup presented by Corona	Newcastle, NSW	Australia
2019	Billabong Pipe Masters	Banzai Pipeline, Oahu	Hawaii
2019	MEO Rip Curl Pro Portugal	Supertubos, Peniche	Portugal
2019	Quiksilver Pro Gold Coast	Gold Coast, Queensland	Australia
2018	MEO Rip Curl Pro Portugal	Supertubos, Peniche	Portugal
2018	Corona Bali Protected	Keramas Beach, Bali	Indonesia
2018	Rip Curl Pro Bells Beach	Bells Beach, Victoria	Australia
Juniors Wins
Year	Event	Venue	Country
2011	Quiksilver Pro Junior	Rio de Janeiro	Brazil
2011	Mormaii Pro Junior	Garopaba	Brazil
Special Events
Year	Event	Venue	Country
2019	Red Bull Airborne Gold Coast	Gold Coast, Queensland	Australia

=== WSL World Championship Tour ===
Tournament	2015	2016	2017	2018	2019	2021	2022	2023	2024
Quiksilver Pro Gold Coast	9th	13th	5th	13th	1st	-	-	-	-
Rip Curl Pro Bells Beach	25th	3rd	INJ	1st	5th	-	5th	17th	17th
Margaret River Pro	13th	3rd	INJ	13th	5th	5th	5th	9th	9th
Oi Rio Pro	3rd	9th	INJ	13th	17th	-	3rd	9th	1st
Corona Bali Protected	-	-	-	1st	17th	-	-	-	-
Corona Open J-Bay	13th	13th	13th	25th	2nd	-	5th	17th	-
Billabong Pro Teahupoo	5th	13th	13th	5th	17th	-	17th	INJ	1st
Surf Ranch Open	-	-	-	13th	9th	9th	-	2nd	-
Quiksilver Pro France	5th	13th	25th	13th	2nd	-	-	-	-
MEO Rip Curl Pro Portugal	2nd	13th	13th	1st	1st	-	3rd	9th	9th
Billabong Pipeline Masters	13th	13th	5th	13th	1st	3rd	9th	17th	17th
Fiji Pro	5th	13th	9th	-	-	-	-	-	9th
Hurley Pro at Trestles	9th	13th	13th	-	-	-	-	-	-
Rip Curl Newcastle Cup	-	-	-	-	-	1st	-	-	-
Rip Curl Narrabeen Classic	-	-	-	-	-	9th	-	-	-
Rip Curl Rottnest Search presented by Corona	-	-	-	-	-	3rd	-	-	-
Corona Open Mexico presented by Quiksilver	-	-	-	-	-	5th	-	-	-
Rip Curl WSL Finals	-	-	-	-	-	3rd	2nd	-	2nd
Hurley Pro Sunset Beach	-	-	-	-	-	-	17th	9th	5th
Quiksilver Pro G-Land	-	-	-	-	-	-	9th	-	-
Surf City El Salvador Pro	-	-	-	-	-	-	3rd	5th	17th
Rank	7th	15th	22nd	4th	1st	3rd	2nd	13th	2nd
Earnings	$171,000	$146,750	$102,750	$398,000	$391,600				
