= MEO Rip Curl Pro Portugal 2017 =

MEO Rip Curl Pro Portugal 2017 at the Surf
- Location: Supertubos beach, Peniche (POR)
- Dates: 20 to 31 October
- Competitors: 36 from 9 nations

Medalists
gold medal	Gabriel Medina	Brazil
silver medal	Julian Wilson	Australia

The MEO Rip Curl Pro Portugal 2017 is an event of the World Surf League for the 2017 World Surf League Men's Championship Tour.

Peniche will receive for the ninth consecutive time the race of the world championship of surfing, which is the 10th of 11 stages of WSL in 2017. The event will be held from 20 to 31 October in the Supertubos beach at Peniche, (Leiria, Portugal) finishing earlier in 25 October with the victory of Gabriel Medina over Julian Wilson. This was Medina's first title in Portugal after a second place back in 2012.

== Round 1 ==
Heat 1
1	Julian Wilson	(Australia)	4.97
2	Leonardo Fioravanti	(Italy)	4.20
3	Caio Ibelli	(Brazil)	2.03

Heat 2
1	Matt Wilkinson	(Australia)	9.84
2	Stuart Kennedy	(Australia)	7.90
3	Bebe Durbidge	(Australia)	7.44

Heat 3
1	Ethan Ewing	(Australia)	10.37
2	Conner Coffin	(United States)	9.34
3	Owen Wright	(Australia)	9.33

Heat 4
1	Josh Kerr	(Australia)	12.83
2	Gabriel Medina	(Brazil)	10.87
3	Wiggolly Dantas	(Brazil)	2.90

Heat 5
1	Jordy Smith	(South Africa)	9.20
2	Vasco Ribeiro	(Portugal)	3.64
3	Italo Ferreira	(Brazil)	2.04

Heat 6
1	John John Florence	(Hawaii)	11.67
2	Mason Ho	(Hawaii)	3.67
3	Kanoa Igarashi	(United States)	0.50

Heat 7
1	Jack Freestone	(Australia)	14.90
2	A. de Souza	(Brazil)	12.67
3	Jérémy Florès	(France)	4.33

Heat 8
1	Michel Bourez	(French Polynesia)	12.00
2	Filipe Toledo	(Brazil)	7.74
3	Jadson André	(Brazil)	4.73

Heat 9
1	Joel Parkinson	(Australia)	13.50
2	Nat Young	(United States)	9.27
3	Joan Duru	(France)	4.73

Heat 10
1	Miguel Pupo	(Brazil)	8.00
2	Kolohe Andino	(United States)	6.66
3	Connor O'Leary	(Australia)	5.17

Heat 11
1	Sebastian Zietz	(Hawaii)	9.77
2	Adrian Buchan	(Australia)	7.90
3	Ezekiel Lau	(Hawaii)	3.97

Heat 12
1	Mick Fanning	(Australia)	15.50
2	Frederico Morais	(Portugal)	6.84
3	Ian Gouveia	(Brazil)	4.50

== Round 2 ==
Heat 1: 1 / Gabriel Medina / (Brazil) / 11.66; 2 / Mason Ho / (Hawaii) / 6.33	Heat 2: 1 / Vasco Ribeiro / (Portugal) / 11.20; 2 / Owen Wright / (Australia) / 10.17	Heat 3: 1 / A. de Souza / (Brazil) / 12.27; 2 / Stuart Kennedy / (Australia) / 4.93	Heat 4: 1 / Leonardo Fioravanti / (Italy) / 15.34; 2 / Filipe Toledo / (Brazil) / 8.40

Heat 5: 1 / Kolohe Andino / (United States) / 14.24; 2 / Jadson André / (Brazil) / 8.00	Heat 6: 1 / Frederico Morais / (Portugal) / 5.03; 2 / Nat Young / (United States) / 2.87	Heat 7: 1 / Adrian Buchan / (Australia) / 9.07; 2 / Ezekiel Lau / (Hawaii) / 6.90	Heat 8: 1 / Connor O'Leary / (Australia) / 10.70; 2 / Ian Gouveia / (Brazil) / 5.97

Heat 9: 1 / Kanoa Igarashi / (United States) / 15.93; 2 / Joan Duru / (France) / 9.23	Heat 10: 1 / Italo Ferreira / (Brazil) / 11.53; 2 / Jérémy Florès / (France) / 7.77	Heat 11: 1 / Caio Ibelli / (Brazil) / 12.33; 2 / Wiggolly Dantas / (Brazil) / 3.87	Heat 12: 1 / Conner Coffin / (United States) / 11.10; 2 / Bebe Durbidge / (Australia) / 8.60

== Round 3 ==
Heat 1: 1 / Leonardo Fioravanti / (Italy) / 9.76; 2 / Matt Wilkinson / (Australia) / 5.63	Heat 2: 1 / Sebastian Zietz / (Hawaii) / 12.10; 2 / Conner Coffin / (United States) / 4.77	Heat 3: 1 / Julian Wilson / (Australia) / 13.43; 2 / Jack Freestone / (Australia) / 7.00	Heat 4: 1 / Kolohe Andino / (United States) / 13.96; 2 / Italo Ferreira / (Brazil) / 12.56

Heat 5: 1 / Connor O'Leary / (Australia) / 15.73; 2 / Adrian Buchan / (Australia) / 15.50	Heat 6: 1 / John John Florence / (Hawaii) / 14.74; 2 / Vasco Ribeiro / (Portugal) / 13.73	Heat 7: 1 / Josh Kerr / (Australia) / 8.67; 2 / Jordy Smith / (South Africa) / 8.27	Heat 8: 1 / Frederico Morais / (Portugal) / 11.00; 2 / Michel Bourez / (French Polynesia) / 8.74

Heat 9: 1 / Kanoa Igarashi / (United States) / 11.67; 2 / Joel Parkinson / (Australia) / 5.27	Heat 10: 1 / Miguel Pupo / (Brazil) / 13.54; 2 / A. de Souza / (Brazil) / 13.24	Heat 11: 1 / Mick Fanning / (Australia) / 11.40; 2 / Caio Ibelli / (Brazil) / 10.40	Heat 12: 1 / Gabriel Medina / (Brazil) / 17.34; 2 / Ethan Ewing / (Australia) / 10.40

== Round 4 ==
Heat 1
1	Julian Wilson	(Australia)	11.67
2	Sebastian Zietz	(Hawaii)	8.10
3	Leonardo Fioravanti	(Italy)	7.77

Heat 2
1	John John Florence	(Hawaii)	17.00
2	Kolohe Andino	(United States)	15.57
3	Connor O'Leary	(Australia)	13.50

Heat 3
1	Kanoa Igarashi	(United States)	16.83
2	Josh Kerr	(Australia)	15.44
3	Frederico Morais	(Portugal)	13.60

Heat 4
1	Gabriel Medina	(Brazil)	14.47
2	Mick Fanning	(Australia)	12.47
3	Miguel Pupo	(Brazil)	5.27

== Round 5 ==
Heat 1: 1 / Sebastian Zietz / (Hawaii) / 12.10; 2 / Connor O'Leary / (Australia) / 12.07	Heat 2: 1 / Kolohe Andino / (United States) / 16.53; 2 / Leonardo Fioravanti / (Italy) / 10.83	Heat 3: 1 / Miguel Pupo / (Brazil) / 15.50; 2 / Josh Kerr / (Australia) / 10.67	Heat 4: 1 / Mick Fanning / (Australia) / 11.87; 2 / Frederico Morais / (Portugal) / 10.00

== Quarter finals ==
Heat 1: 1 / Julian Wilson / (Australia) / 7.50; 2 / Sebastian Zietz / (Hawaii) / 7.40	Heat 2: 1 / Kolohe Andino / (United States) / 14.00; 2 / John John Florence / (Hawaii) / 3.80	Heat 3: 1 / Kanoa Igarashi / (United States) / 12.50; 2 / Miguel Pupo / (Brazil) / 8.44	Heat 4: 1 / Gabriel Medina / (Brazil) / 11.33; 2 / Mick Fanning / (Australia) / 3.17

== Semi finals ==
Heat 1: 1 / Julian Wilson / (Australia) / 16.83; 2 / Kolohe Andino / (United States) / 14.56	Heat 2: 1 / Gabriel Medina / (Brazil) / 11.10; 2 / Kanoa Igarashi / (United States) / 6.24

== Final ==
Heat 1
1	Gabriel Medina	(Brazil)	13.26
2	Julian Wilson	(Australia)	10.94
