= MEO Rip Curl Pro Portugal 2016 =

MEO Rip Curl Pro Portugal 2016 at the Surf
- Location: Supertubos beach, Peniche (POR)
- Dates: 18 to 29 October
- Competitors: 36 from 8 nations

Medalists
gold medal	John John Florence	Hawaii
silver medal	Conner Coffin	United States

The MEO Rip Curl Pro Portugal 2016 was an event of the World Surf League for 2016 World Surf League Men's Championship Tour.

This event was held from 18 to 29 October in the Supertubos beach at Peniche, (Leiria, Portugal), with 36 surfers competing. Due to the lack of conditions, the organization explored some good surfing spots in the peninsula to end the event in the correct date and some stages of the event were also held at Point Fabril beach between Almagreira and Pico da Mota in Ferrel(pt). Soon as the good waves came back to Supertubos the organization switched again of place.

The tournament was won by John John Florence, who beat the rookie Conner Coffin in the final.

== Quarter-finals ==
Heat 1: 1 / Kolohe Andino / (United States) / 17.34; 2 / Adriano De Souza / (Brazil) / 8.10	Heat 2: 1 / John John Florence / (Hawaii) / 16.90; 2 / Julian Wilson / (Australia) / 13.57	Heat 3: 1 / Conner Coffin / (United States) / 12.66; 2 / Miguel Pupo / (Brazil) / 5.94	Heat 4: 1 / Jordy Smith / (South Africa) / 17.40; 2 / Sebastian Zietz / (Hawaii) / 13.56

== Semi-finals ==
Heat 1: 1 / John John Florence / (Hawaii) / 13.84; 2 / Kolohe Andino / (United States) / 8.47	Heat 2: 1 / Conner Coffin / (United States) / 15.00; 2 / Jordy Smith / (South Africa) / 14.37

== Final ==
Heat 1
1	John John Florence	(Hawaii)	16,67
2	Conner Coffin	(United States)	9.93
