= Adriano de Souza =

Brazilian surfer

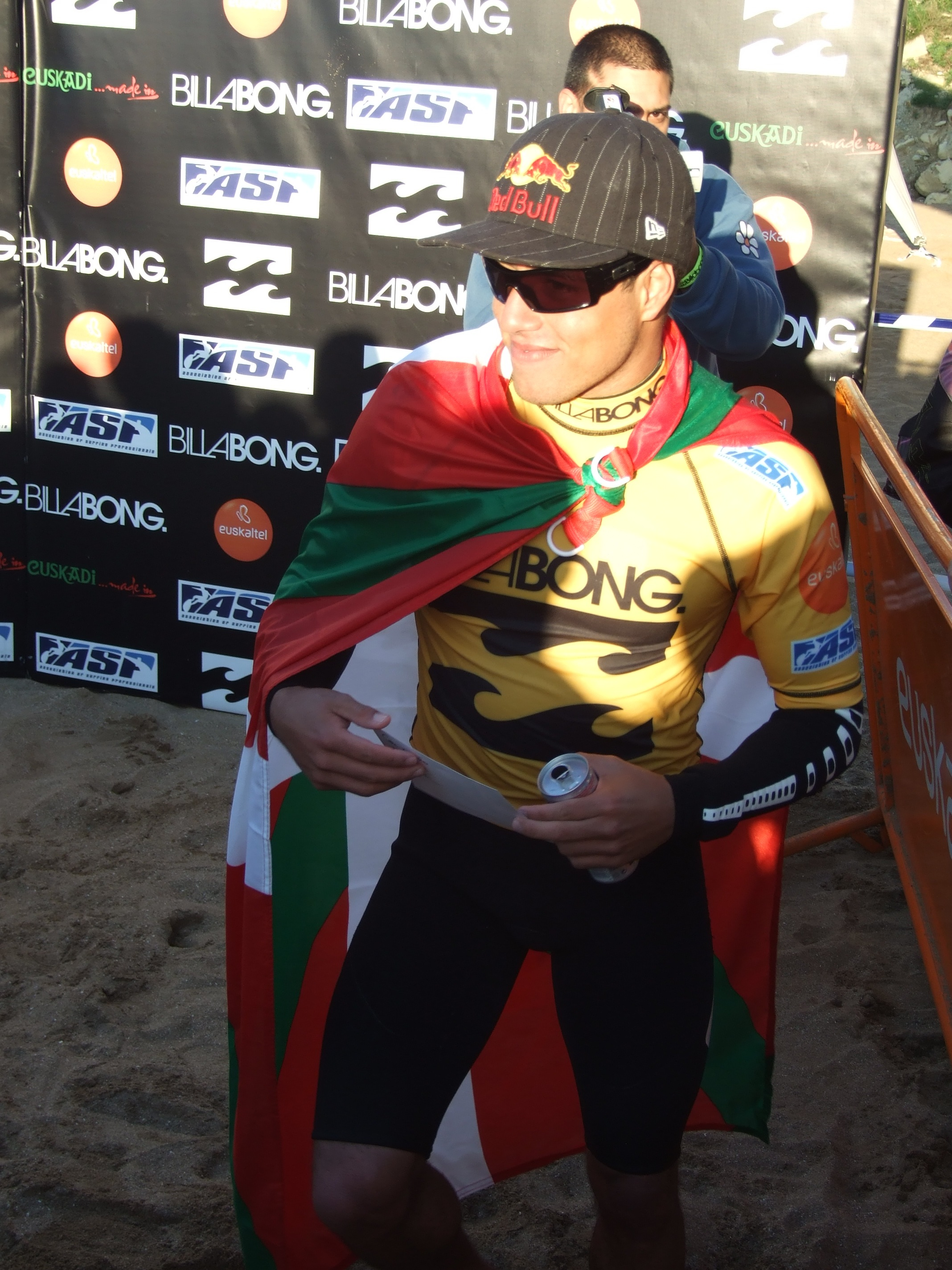
- de Souza in 2009

Personal information
- Born: February 13, 1987 (age 39) São Paulo, Brazil
- Height: 5 ft 6 in (1.68 m)
- Weight: 137 lb (62 kg)

Surfing career
- Sport: Surfing
- Best year: 1st: 2015 - WSL World Champion
- Career earnings: $2,073,400
- Sponsors: HD, Red Bull, Oakley, Oi, G-Shock, Mitsubishi do Brasil, FCS fins, Banana Wax, JBL, Mini Kalzone, Nossolar.
- Major achievements: 2015 World Champion; 2003 World Junior Champion; 2005 World Qualifying Series Champion; WSL Championship Tour event wins: 7

Surfing specifications
- Stance: Regular (natural foot)
- Shaper: Al Merrick (Channel Island Surfboards)
- Quiver: 5 ft 10 in (1.78 m) × 17 7/8 in (450 mm) × 2 1/8 in (54 mm)
- Favorite waves: Riozinho
- Favorite maneuvers: Boosting airs

Adriano "Mineirinho" de Souza (born February 13, 1987) is a Brazilian professional surfer and also the 2015 WSL World Champion. He has been competing on the World Surf League Men's World Tour since 2005.

== Overview ==
Adriano de Souza is seen by many as the "hardest working man" on the WSL Tour. To many observers, like 1989 World Champion and WSL commentator Martin Potter, and former top-44 surfer and WSL commentator Ross Williams, Adriano is more eager to learn, more willing to fight, and spends more time learning the game and trying to evolve his surfing than any of his peers/competitors—with the likely exception of 11-time World Champion Kelly Slater.

WSL commentators Potter and Williams usually highlighted during WSL surf broadcasts how Adriano gets to the venues of the surf contests much earlier than his opponents, sometimes weeks in advance, to learn and adapt as much as possible. They also usually talk about how Adriano almost "never falls" on his waves, and how he loves to fight for the inside position and surf the first wave of every heat.

Surf journalist/historian Matt Warshaw wrote in the Encyclopedia of Surfing that Adriano is a "determined pro surfer, (...) built like a terrier (5'6", 137 pounds) and fixed to his board with a wide, squat, function-first stance". Warshaw noted that during Adriano World Title campaign he "rode with near-monomaniacal intensity and often willed his way to heat victories against more talented surfers". Warshaw also stated that Adriano was for the most part heralded as a worthy and deserving World Champion "after years of being ignored or ridiculed by surfing's English-speaking tastemakers".

The tale of how Adriano asked—and then begged and then convinced -- Banzai Pipeline top local surfer Jamie O'Brien (surfer) to stay at his house during the season finale in Hawaii (in order to be able to surf the break everyday and to learn its tricks straight from O'Brien) became famous in the surfing world. It showed the lengths Adriano was willing to go in order to improve his surfing abilities and win the WSL Surfing World Title.

== Surfing career ==
=== Accomplishments ===
2003

- Won ASP World Junior Championship (Youngest champion ever - Age 16)

2005

- Won ASP 5-Star event – Billabong Costa do Sauipe
- Won ASP Super Series event – Rip Curl Pro Hossegor
- ASP World Qualifying Series Winner

2006

- Ranked #20 on the 2006 ASP World Tour

2007

- Ranked #28 on the 2007 ASP World Tour
- Won ASP 6-Star event – Onbongo Pro Surfing
- Won ASP 6-Star event – Maresia Surf International

2008

- Ranked #7 on the 2008 ASP World Tour
- Won ASP 5-Star event – Billabong ECO Surf Festival
- Won ASP 4-Star event – Mark Richards Pro Newcastle

2009

- Ranked #5 on the 2009 ASP World Tour
- Won first ASP World Tour event – Billabong Pro Mundaka – Mundaka, Spain

2010

- Ranked #10 on the 2010 ASP World Tour

2011

- Ranked #5 on the 2011 ASP World Tour
- Won ASP World Tour event – Billabong Pro Rio – Rio de Janeiro, Brazil
- Won ASP World Tour event – Rip Curl Pro Portugal – Peniche, Portugal

2012

- Ranked #5 on the 2012 ASP World Tour rankings
- Won ASP 6-Star event – Billabong Pro Jeffreys Bay – South Africa

2013

- Ranked #12 on the 2013 ASP World Tour rankings
- Won ASP World Tour event – Rip Curl Pro Bells Beach – Torquay, Australia

2014

- Ranked #8 on the 2014 ASP World Tour rankings
- Won ASP 6-Star event – Australian Open of Surfing – Manly Beach, Australia

2015

- WSL Samsung Galaxy Championship Tour Champion
- Won Margaret River Pro Tour event – Margaret River, Australia
- Won Billabong Pipeline Masters Tour event – Banzai Pipeline, Hawaii

2016

- Ranked #11 on the WSL Samsung Galaxy Championship Tour rankings

2017

- Won Oi Rio Pro Tour event – Saquarema, Rio de Janeiro, Brazil

== Career Victories ==
WCT Wins
Year	Event	Venue	Country
2017	Oi Rio Pro	Saquarema, Rio de Janeiro	Brazil
2015	Margaret River Pro	Margaret River, Western Australia	Australia
2015	Billabong Pipe Masters	Banzai Pipeline, Oahu	Hawaii
2013	Rip Curl Pro Bells Beach	Bells Beach, Victoria	Australia
2011	Billabong Rio Pro	Rio de Janeiro, RJ	Brazil
2011	Rip Curl Pro Portugal	Supertubos, Peniche	Portugal
2009	Billabong Pro Mundaka	Mundaka, Basque Country	Spain
WQS Wins
Year	Event	Venue	Country
2023	Circuito Banco do Brasil de Surfe - Garopaba	Garopaba, Santa Catarina	Brazil
2014	Hurley Australian Open	Sydney	Australia
2012	Billabong Pro	Jeffrey's Bay	South Africa
2008	Mark Richards Pro	Newcastle	Australia
2008	Billabong ECO Surf Festival	Coconut Coast	Brazil
2007	Onbongo Pro Surfing	Ubatuba	Brazil
2007	Maresia Surf International	Maresias	Brazil
2005	Billabong Costa do Sauipe	Costa do Sauípe	Brazil
2005	Rip Curl Pro Hossegor	Hossegor	France

=== WSL World Championship Tour ===
Tournament	2006	2007	2008	2009	2010	2011	2012	2013	2014	2015	2016	2017	2018
Quiksilver Pro Gold Coast	3rd	17th	9th	2nd	5th	9th	2nd	25th	3rd	3rd	5th	9th	9th
Rip Curl Pro	33rd	17th	9th	17th	5th	3rd	9th	1st	5th	2nd	13th	5th	13th
Margaret River Pro	-	-	-	-	-	-	-	-	9th	1st	13th	5th	13th
Rio Pro	-	-	-	-	-	1st	5th	2nd	9th	13th	3rd	1st	25th
Corona Bali Protected	-	-	-	-	-	-	-	9th	-	-	-	-	9th
J-Bay Open	5th	5th	5th	17th	5th	13th	-	-	5th	5th	9th	13th	9th
Billabong Pro Teahupoo	33rd	17th	5th	5th	9th	25th	13th	25th	25th	13th	25th	13th	13th
Surf Ranch Open	-	-	-	-	-	-	-	-	-	-	-	-	13th
Quiksilver Pro France	17th	33rd	3rd	33rd	25th	25th	25th	13th	13th	3rd	9th	13th	5th
MEO Rip Curl Pro Portugal	-	-	-	-	25th	1st	3rd	13th	5th	13th	5th	13th	25th
Billabong Pipeline Masters	33rd	33rd	9th	17th	13th	13th	13th	13th	INJ	1st	13th	13th	INJ
Fiji Pro	33rd	-	3rd	-	-	-	5th	25th	5th	13th	5th	13th	-
Hurley Pro at Trestles	17th	17th	-	5th	13th	5th	3rd	9th	5th	2nd	25th	5th	-
O'Neill Coldwater Classic	-	-	-	-	-	-	5th	-	-	-	-	-	-
Rip Curl Search	17th	33rd	17th	9th	5th	13th	-	-	-	-	-	-	-
Quiksilver Pro New York	-	-	-	-	-	9th	-	-	-	-	-	-	-
Santa Catarina Pro	17th	17th	DNP	2nd	9th	-	-	-	-	-	-	-	-
Billabong Pro Spain	9th	9th	5th	1st	-	-	-	-	-	-	-	-	-
Boost Mobile Pro	-	-	9th	-	-	-	-	-	-	-	-	-	-
Rank	20th	28th	7th	5th	10th	5th	5th	13th	8th	1st	11th	8th	19th
Earnings	-	-	-	-	$87.250	$276.750	$142.500	$190.000	$277.500	$377.000	$149.500	$232.250	$129.100

Achievements
Preceded by Gabriel Medina	World Surf League Surfing World Champion (men's); 2015	Succeeded by John John Florence
