= Alex Ribeiro (surfer) =

Brazilian surfer

Personal information
- Born: December 19, 1989 (age 36) Praia Grande, São Paulo, Brazil
- Height: 5 ft 11 in (180 cm)
- Weight: 169 lb (77 kg)

Surfing career
- Sport: Surfing
- Best year: 2021 - Ranked #33 WSL World Tour
- Career earnings: $220,525

Surfing specifications
- Stance: Goofy

Alex Ribeiro (born 1989) is a Brazilian professional surfer who competes on the World Surfing League Men's World Tour since 2016.

== Career ==
Ribeiro earned a spot on the 2016 World Championship Tour season by finishing in 8th place on the 2015 WSL World Qualifying Series season. Alex finished the 2016 season in 35th place, failing to requalify for the next season. He returned to the CT again in the 2021 season, after he finished 6th in the 2019 QS. He again failed to requalify for the next season and did not return to the CT.

== Career Victories ==
WQS Wins
Year	Event	Venue	Country
2019	Burton Automotive Pro	Newcastle, New South Wales	Australia
2018	Pro Casablanca	Ain Diab, Casablanca	Morocco
2017	Jordy Smith Cape Town Surf Pro	Melkbosstrand, Cape Town	South Africa
2017	Volkswagen SA Open of Surfing	New Pier, Durban	South Africa
2015	Quiksilver Pro Saquarema	Saquarema, Rio de Janeiro	Brazil
2014	Mahalo Surf Eco Festival	Itacaré, Bahia	Brazil
2014	Rip Curl Pro Stamina	Playa Grande, Mar del Plata	Argentina

=== WSL World Championship Tour ===
Tournament	2015	2016
Quiksilver Pro Gold Coast	-	25th
Rip Curl Pro	-	25th
Margaret River Pro	-	25th
Rio Pro	25th	25th
Fiji Pro	-	25th
J-Bay Open	-	25th
Billabong Pro Teahupoo	-	13th
Hurley Pro Trestles	-	5th
Quiksilver Pro France	-	25th
Rip Curl Pro Portugal	-	25th
Billabong Pipeline Masters	-	13th
Rank	47th	35th
Earnings	$9.000	$109.500
