= John John Florence =

American professional surfer (born 1992)

John "John John" Alexander Florence
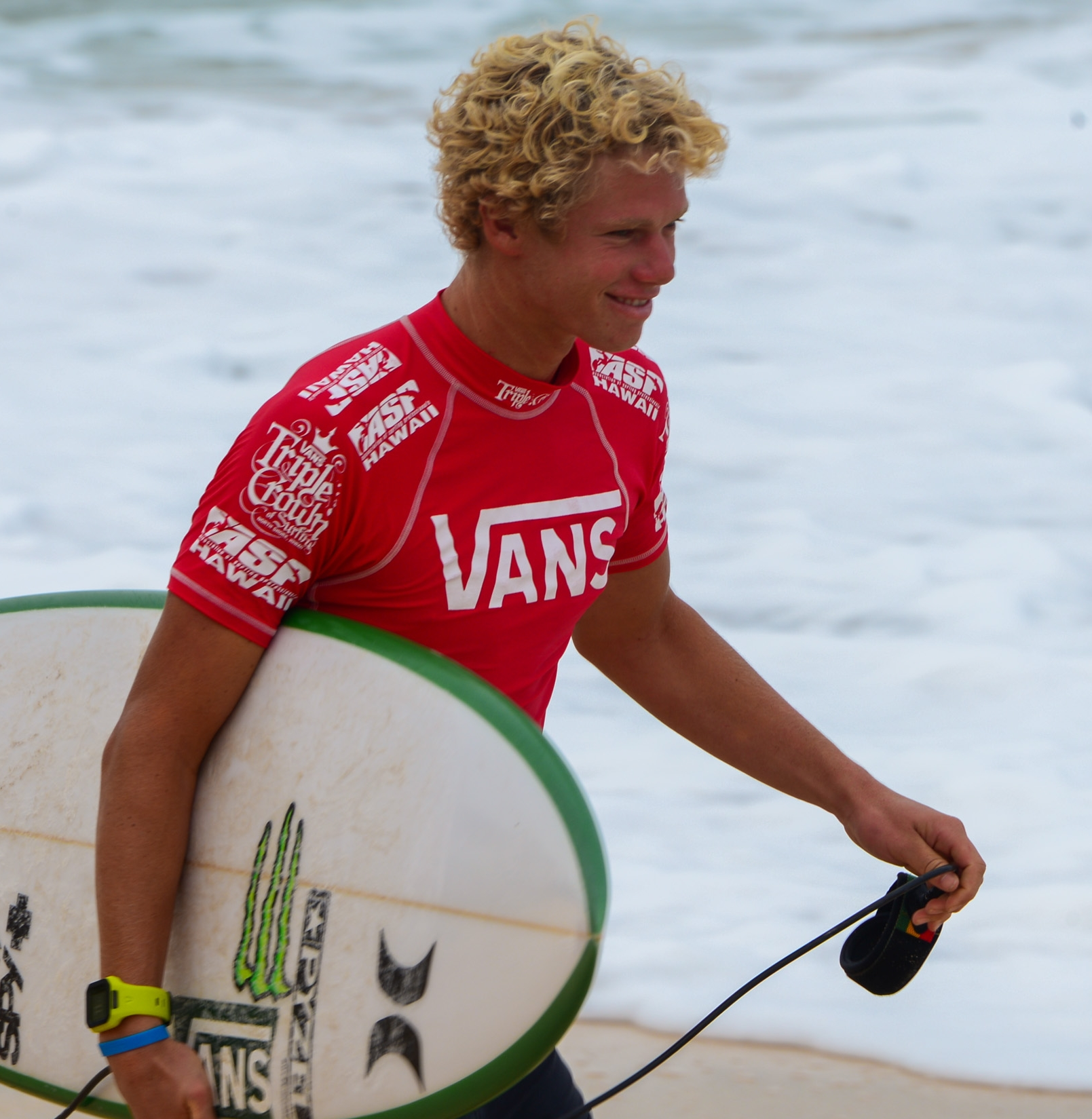
- Florence at the 2013 Triple Crown of Surfing

Personal information
- Born: October 18, 1992 (age 33) Honolulu, Hawaii, U.S.
- Height: 6 ft 1 in (185 cm)
- Weight: 185 lb (84 kg)
- Website: www.johnjohnflorence.com

Surfing career
- Sport: Surfing
- Best year: 1st: 2016, 2017, 2024 - WSL World Champion
- Sponsors: Florence, Machu Picchu Energy, VEIA Supplies, Therabody, Yeti and Pyzel surfboards
- Major achievements: 3x World Champion (2016, 2017, 2024); 5x Triple Crown of Surfing Champion (2011, 2013, 2016, 2020, 2021); WSL Championship Tour event wins: 10; 2023 Vans Pipe Master Champion; 2015 Winner of Eddie Aikau Big Wave Invitational; 2012 WSL Rookie of the Year

Surfing specifications
- Stance: Regular (natural foot)

John "John John" Alexander Florence (born October 18, 1992) is an American professional surfer. He is considered one of the most dominant pipe surfers of his era and won back-to-back world titles on the 2016 World Surf League and 2017 World Surf League Men's Championship Tour. He is the first Hawaii-born surfer to win back-to-back world titles since the late Andy Irons. Florence qualified to represent the United States at the 2020 Summer Olympics in surfing's debut, as well as qualified for the Paris Olympic Games.

== Early life ==
Born in Honolulu, Hawaii, the oldest of three brothers. Florence grew up in Hale'iwa in an ocean-side house at Banzai Pipeline. He was introduced to surfing by his mother, Alexandra, who is a surfer herself. With his mother's help, Florence first rode on a surfboard when he was six-months old, and he was surfing on his own by the age of five. He also enjoys skateboarding, snowboarding and drawing.

He was named after John F. Kennedy Jr., who was dubbed "John John" by the media while his father was president.

== Career ==
At the age of 13, standing at 4'11" and weighing 85 pounds, Florence became the youngest surfer ever to compete in the Vans Triple Crown of Surfing, which consists of three big-wave surfing contests in Hawaii. He had previously won five amateur awards, the 2003 1st NSSA Nationals Open Mini Grom, the 2005 1st NSSA Nationals Open Boy's, the 2005 NSSA Open Boys and the Explorer Menehune Champion. He did not pass the first round, but he did score higher than Shane Dorian, a professional surfer twenty years Florence's senior. Afterwards, Florence said he was "pretty scared," but that he was "happy with how [he] did". When Florence was still a youngster, pro surfer Kelly Slater said, "John John's going to know the waves on North Shore like no one we've ever seen before."

In 2011, Florence suffered a broken back while riding a wave at Banzai Pipeline. He has also had a broken wrist, broken leg, broken arm and ankle ligament tear.

Since joining the World Surf League (WSL) and competing against the best surfers in the world, Florence has ranked 34th in 2011, 4th in 2012, 10th in 2013, 3rd in 2014, and 14th in 2015. Florence was the 2016 and 2017 WSL Champion. He ranked 35th in 2018, 5th in 2019, 11th in 2021, and 12th in 2022.

Florence won the Vans World Cup of Surfing in 2011 and 2013. He is the youngest contestant to have won this honor.

According to surfer Mitch Crews, who witnessed Florence's performance at the 2014 Billabong Pro Teahupoo, "He makes it look stupidly easily no matter how big or small the wave is. He is the man out there, rules the line up and makes everyone look silly. He is the man, and most of us are not." Florence won the prestigious SURFER POLL award in the 2014-2015 year. He has won the Volcom Pipe Pro an astonishing 4 times and has been declared the all-time ruler of this contest. In October 2014, he won the Quiksilver Pro France. In February 2015, Florence won the 2015 Volcom Pipe Pro, which was his fourth win at this event in five years.

On February 25, 2016, Florence won "The Eddie" Quiksilver Big Wave Invitational in memory of Eddie Aikau, at Waimea Bay, the first time the event ran in seven years. He is one of the only ten surfers who have won the event. On October 25, 2016, Florence won the Meo Rip Curl Pro, in Portugal securing the WSL World Championship title. Florence was the first Hawaiian surfer in over a decade to win the title since Andy Irons last won it in 2004.

After a dominating 2016 season, Florence continued to show a strong performance in the 2017 WSL season, alongside his new coach Ross Williams. John John's strong performances all year long made him a clear favorite to take home top honors again. In December 2017, Florence clinched his second straight world title at Pipeline, coming in second in the event to Jeremy Flores.

In December 2019, Florence qualified for the 2020 Olympics despite missing much of the 2019 World Surf League Men's Champion Tour due to an ACL injury. Florence finished the 2019 WSL Tour ranking seventh after competing in 6 of the 11 events. At the Olympics, he was eliminated in the third round by teammate Kolohe Andino.

Florence won the Billabong Pipeline Masters in December 2020, beating Brazilian surfer Gabriel Medina in the finals, but missed most of the 2021 season after incurring an injury at the Boost Mobile Margaret River Pro, finishing 11th at the end of the year. In December 2021, Florence won the Michelob ULTRA Pure Gold Haleiwa Challenger, scoring an excellent heat in the final.

He retained the Triple Crown of Surfing for 2021, in an event held in January 2022, alongside fellow Hawaiian Carissa Moore. In December 2023, Florence won the Vans Pipe Masters, alongside fellow Hawaiian Moana Jones Wong.

In 2024, Florence was the first seed at the conclusion of the WSL season, clinching his third world title at Lower Trestles against Italo Ferreira.

On 21 January 2025, Florence announced on Instagram that he will be stepping back from the 2025 World Surf League (WSL) Championship Tour to "focus on surfing in a different way". The WSL later confirmed that Alan Cleland Jr. would take Florence's position and that Florence will receive the wildcard position for the 2026 Championship Tour.

=== Sponsorships ===
In 2013, Florence changed sponsors, joining Hurley International, after surfing for O'Neill since he was six years old. On January 27, 2020, John John announced he would be leaving Hurley after Hurley's owner, Bluestar Alliance, walked back John John's contract and offered him a $2,000,000 buyout deal.

== Surfing films ==
Done

With videography by director Blake Vincent Kueny and premiering at the House of Vans, in Brooklyn, on February 23, 2013, Done, Florence's first surfing film, received Surfer Poll 2013 Movie of the Year Award. JJF received Surfer Poll 2013 Best Performance Award for his role in Done.

Departure Delayed, Free to Roam, Begin Again, Again, And Again

Released in 2013, Departure Delayed, Free to Roam, Begin Again, Again, And Again are five shorts from Florence. Begin Again received Surfer Poll 2013 Short of the Year Award.

View from a Blue Moon

Released on December 1, 2015, with videography by Blake Vincent Kueny, narration by John C. Reilly, and the track Seasick Dream by Jack Johnson, View from a Blue Moon is a biography featuring Florence and his friends surfing around the world. On November 11, 2015,View from a Blue Moon, the first surf film shot in 4k, premiered with seven screenings worldwide.

The film was shot using aerial photography provided entirely by helicopters.

Let's Be Frank

In 2016, Florence narrated the film Let's Be Frank, a rockumentary film based on big wave surfer, Frank Solomon.

Twelve On July 8, 2016, Florence released the first episode of his series Twelve. The series consists of 7 episodes, which were released approximately every month, about Florence's quest for the first world title of his career.

== Surfing results ==
=== Victories ===
WSL Finals Wins
| Year | Event | Venue | Country |
| 2024 | Lexus WSL Finals | Lower Trestles, California | United States |

WCT Wins
| Year | Event | Venue | Country |
| 2024 | Surf City El Salvador Pro | Punta Roca, La Libertad | El Salvador |
| 2021 | Billabong Pipeline Masters | Banzai Pipeline, Oahu | Hawaii |
| 2019 | Margaret River Pro | Margaret River, Western Australia | Australia |
| 2019 | Rip Curl Pro | Bells Beach, Victoria | Australia |
| 2017 | Drug Aware Margaret River Pro | Margaret River, Western Australia | Australia |
| 2016 | MEO Rip Curl Pro Portugal | Supertubos, Peniche | Portugal |
| 2016 | Oi Rio Pro | Rio de Janeiro, RJ | Brazil |
| 2014 | Quiksilver Pro France | Hossegor, Nouvelle-Aquitaine | France |
| 2012 | Billabong Rio Pro | Rio de Janeiro, RJ | Brazil |
WSL Challenger Series Wins
| Year | Event | Venue | Country |
| 2022 | Haleiwa Challenger, at Home in The Hawaiian Islands | Haleiwa, Oahu | Hawaii |
| 2021 | Michelob ULTRA Pure Gold Haleiwa Challenger | Haleiwa, Oahu | Hawaii |
WQS Wins
| Year | Event | Venue | Country |
| 2021 | HIC Pipe Pro | Banzai Pipeline, Oahu | Hawaii |
| 2016 | Hawaiian Pro | Haleiwa, Oahu | Hawaii |
| 2015 | Volcom Pipe Pro | Banzai Pipeline, Oahu | Hawaii |
| 2013 | Volcom Pipe Pro | Banzai Pipeline, Oahu | Hawaii |
| 2012 | Telstra Drug Aware Pro | Margaret River, Western Australia | Australia |
| 2012 | Volcom Pipe Pro | Banzai Pipeline, Oahu | Hawaii |
| 2011 | Van's World Cup | Sunset Beach, Oahu | Hawaii |
| 2011 | Volcom Pipe Pro | Banzai Pipeline, Oahu | Hawaii |

=== WSL World Championship Tour ===
| Tournament | 2011 | 2012 | 2013 | 2014 | 2015 | 2016 | 2017 | 2018 | 2019 | 2021 | 2022 |
|---|---|---|---|---|---|---|---|---|---|---|---|
| Quiksilver Pro Gold Coast | - | 13th | 13th | 25th | 13th | 5th | 3rd | 25th | 3rd | - | 9th |
| Rip Curl Pro | - | 9th | INJ | 3rd | 13th | 13th | 3rd | 13th | 1st | - | 5th |
| Margaret River Pro | - | - | - | 13th | 2nd | 13th | 1st | 13th | 1st | INJ | 2nd |
| Rio Pro | - | 1st | INJ | 13th | 9th | 1st | 13th | 9th | 5th | - | INJ |
| Corona Bali Protected | - | - | - | - | - | - | - | 13th | 17th | - | - |
| Fiji Pro | - | 5th | 3rd | 5th | INJ | 5th | 13th | - | - | - | - |
| J-Bay Open | - | - | - | 13th | INJ | 2nd | 5th | INJ | INJ | - | INJ |
| Billabong Pro Teahupoo | - | 3rd | 5th | 3rd | 13th | 2nd | 5th | INJ | INJ | - | INJ |
| Hurley Pro at Trestles | 13th | 5th | 25th | 2nd | 25th | 13th | 3rd | - | - | - | - |
| Quiksilver Pro France | 25th | 3rd | 5th | 1st | 5th | 3rd | 3rd | INJ | INJ | - | - |
| MEO Rip Curl Pro Portugal | 9th | 5th | 9th | 3rd | 13th | 1st | 5th | INJ | INJ | - | 3rd |
| Billabong Pipeline Masters | 5th | 13th | 2nd | 5th | 9th | 5th | 2nd | INJ | 5th | 1st | 5th |
| Oakley Pro Bali | - | - | 9th | - | - | - | - | - | - | - | - |
| O'Neill Coldwater Classic | - | 25th | - | - | - | - | - | - | - | - | - |
| Rip Curl Search | 25th | - | - | - | - | - | - | - | - | - | - |
| Rip Curl Newcastle Cup | - | - | - | - | - | - | - | - | - | 17th | - |
| Rip Curl Narrabeen Classic | - | - | - | - | - | - | - | - | - | 9th | - |
| Rip Curl Rottnest Search presented by Corona | - | - | - | - | - | - | - | - | - | INJ | - |
| Surf Ranch Open | - | - | - | - | - | - | - | INJ | - | INJ | - |
| Hurley Pro Sunset Beach | - | - | - | - | - | - | - | - | - | - | 17th |
| Quiksilver Pro G-Land | - | - | - | - | - | - | - | - | - | - | 9th |
| Surf City El Salvador Pro | - | - | - | - | - | - | - | - | - | - | INJ |
| Rank | 34th | 4th | 10th | 3rd | 14th | 1st | 1st | 35th | 5th | 11th | 12th |
| Earnings | $47.250 | $211.250 | $117.500 | $266.500 | $131.500 | $406.000 | $181.250 | $59.200 | $268.500 | $106.000 | |

== Personal life ==
Florence is married to Lauryn Cribb.

His brother, Nathan, competes on the Big Wave World Tour after qualifying in 2018.

Achievements
| Preceded by Adriano De Souza | World Surf League Surfing World Champion (men's); 2016, 2017, 2024 | Succeeded by |
