= Garopaba =

- Municipality
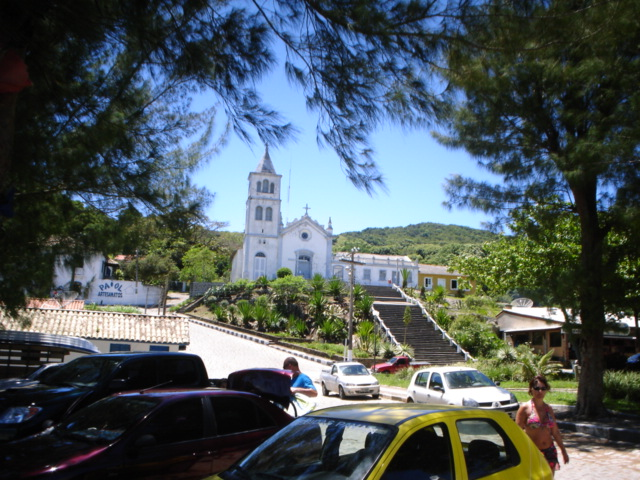

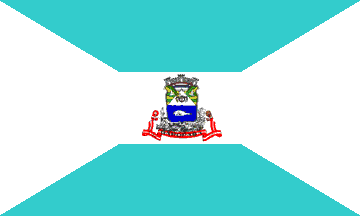
- Flag Coat of arms

- Location in Brazil
- Coordinates: 28.0233°S 48.6222°W
- Country: Brazil
- Region: South
- State: Santa Catarina
- Mesoregion: Sul Catarinense

Population (2020)
  - Total: 23,579
- Time zone: UTC−3 (BRT)

Garopaba is a municipality in the state of Santa Catarina in the South region of Brazil.

== See also ==
- List of municipalities in Santa Catarina
