= Matt Wilkinson (surfer) =

Australian surfer (born 1988)

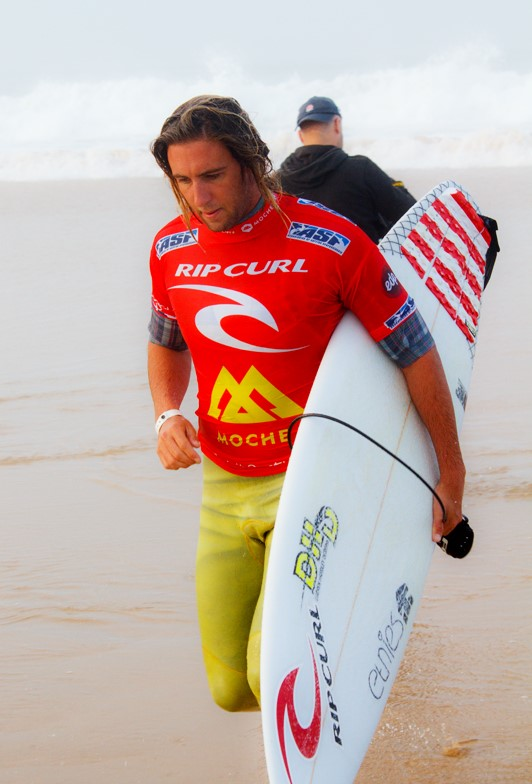

Personal information
- Born: 29 September 1988 (age 37) Sydney, Australia
- Height: 5 ft 11 in (1.80 m)
- Weight: 180 lb (82 kg)

Surfing career
- Sport: Surfing
- Best year: 2016, 2017 – Ranked No. 5 WSL CT World Tour
- Major achievements: WSL Championship Tour event wins: 3

Surfing specifications
- Stance: Goofy

Matt Wilkinson is a professional Australian surfer.

== Life and career ==
Known for being a goofyfooter, Wilkinson is from a small town called Copacabana in New South Wales. In 2016, he won his first two Championship Tour events.

== Career Victories ==
WCT Wins
Year	Event	Venue	Country
2017	Outerknown Fiji Pro	Namotu, Tavarua	Fiji
2016	Rip Curl Pro Bells Beach	Bells Beach, Victoria	Australia
2016	Quiksilver Pro Gold Coast	Gold Coast, Queensland	Australia
WQS Wins
Year	Event	Venue	Country
2016	Maitland & Port Stephens Toyota Pro	Newcastle, New South Wales	Australia
2012	Coca-Cola Saquarema Prime	Saquarema, Rio de Janeiro	Brazil
2010	Coldwater Classic	Steamer Lane, California	United States
2006	Central Coast Pro	Soldiers Beach, New South Wales	Australia
