= Michel Bourez =

French surfer (born 1986)

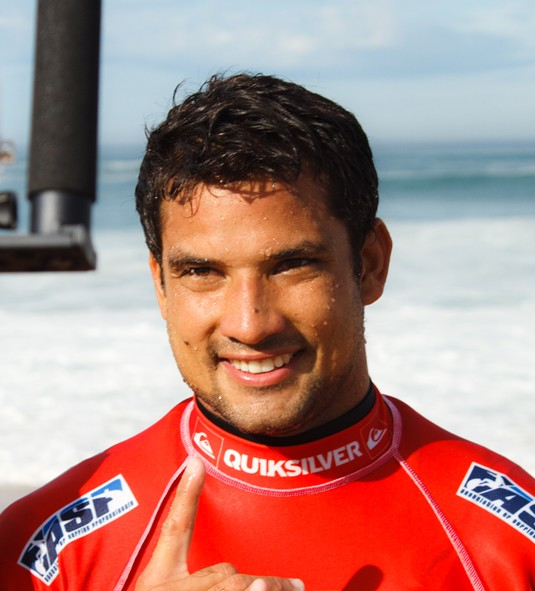
- Michel Bourez in 2013 at Quiksilver Pro France

Personal information
- Nickname: Spartan
- Born: December 30, 1985 (age 40) Rurutu, French Polynesia, France
- Height: 1.75 m (5 ft 9 in)
- Weight: 176 lb (80 kg)
- Website: michelbourez.com

Surfing career
- Sport: Surfing
- Best year: 2014 - Ranked #5 WSL CT World Tour
- Sponsors: Hurley, Futures Fins, Kelly surfshop, Firewire surfboard, OAM accessories, Red Bull
- Major achievements: WSL Championship Tour event wins: 3

Surfing specifications
- Stance: Regular (natural foot)
Medal record
Men's surfing
Representing France
World Games
Gold medal – first place	2021 Miyazaki	Team

Michel Bourez (born 30 December 1985) is a French professional surfer.

== Biography ==
Bourez was born on the island of Rurutu in the Tuamotus Islands in French Polynesia and started surfing at age 13. European champion in 2006, Michel entered the ASP World Tour in 2009.

His best results on the World Tour came in 2014, with a fifth place in the overall classification, having won twice during the year; at Margaret River Pro 2014 and Rio de Janeiro and third place in Fiji Pro.

His 2015 season was hampered by a severe injury in May, when doing a free surf session at Teahupoo. A fractured hand and cervical vertebra forced him out of the Rio and Fiji events.

In 2016, he earned his third career victory at the Billabong Pipeline Masters, final event of the 2016 World Tour, finishing sixth overall.

He qualified to represent France at the debut of surfing at the 2020 Summer Olympics.

== Career victories ==
ASP-WCT Wins
Year	Event	Venue	Country
2016	Billabong Pipe Masters	Banzai Pipeline, Oahu	Hawaii
2014	Billabong Rio Pro	Rio de Janeiro, RJ	Brazil
2014	Drug Aware Margaret River Pro	Margaret River, Western Australia	Australia
WQS Wins
Year	Event	Venue	Country
2014	Vans World Cup of Surfing	Sunset Beach, Oahu	Hawaii
2013	Reef Hawaiian Pro	Haleiwa, Oahu	Hawaii
2008	Reef Hawaiian Pro	Haleiwa, Oahu	Hawaii
2005	La Caja de Canarias-Ocean & Earth Pro	Las Palmas, Gran Canaria	Spain

== See also ==
- ASP World Tour
