= Sebastian Zietz =

American surfer

Personal information
- Nickname: Seabass
- Born: February 6, 1988 (age 37) Fort Pierce, Florida, U.S.
- Height: 1.83 m (6 ft 0 in)
- Weight: 169 lb (77 kg)

Surfing career
- Sport: Surfing
- Best year: 2017 – Ranked No. 11 WSL CT World Tour
- Sponsors: Channel Islands, Oakley, O'Neill, Futures Fins, Sol Republic
- Major achievements: WSL Championship Tour event wins: 1

Surfing specifications
- Stance: Regular (natural foot)

Sebastian Zietz (born February 6, 1988) is a professional American surfer. Zietz was born in Fort Pierce, Florida, but grew up in Kauaʻi, Hawaii, after his parents moved there in 1988; he started surfing at 4 years old. In 2013, he qualified for the World Championship Tour for the first time, after winning the Reef Hawaiian Pro at Haleiwa, Hawaii.

In 2016, he won his first World Surf League event, the Drug Aware Margaret River Pro held in Margaret River, Western Australia.

== Career Victories ==
WCT Wins
Year	Event	Venue	Country
2016	Drug Aware Margaret River Pro	Margaret River, Western Australia	Australia
WQS Wins
Year	Event	Venue	Country
2012	Reef Hawaiian Pro	Haleiwa, Oahu	Hawaii
