= Keanu Asing =

American surfer (born 1993)

Personal information
- Born: May 30, 1993 (age 33) Honolulu, Hawaii, U.S.
- Years active: 2010–present
- Height: 5 ft 5 in (1.65 m)
- Weight: 143 lb (65 kg; 10.2 st)
- Website: www.keanuasing.com

Surfing career
- Sport: Surfing
- Sponsors: Local Motion Surfboards, Rockstar, Pro Lite, Vertra
- Major achievements: WSL Championship Tour event wins: 1

Surfing specifications
- Stance: Regular (natural foot)

Keanu Asing (born May 30, 1993) is a Hawaiian surfer who competes in the World Surf League and debuted on the World Championship Tour of the 2015 World Surf League.

== Awards and achievements ==
=== Season by season ===
- 2010: 3rd in HIC Pro at Oahu (Hawaii)
- 2012: 3rd in Quiksilver Saquarema Prime in Saquarema (Brazil)
- 2013: 3rd in Vans Pro in Virginia Beach (USA)
- 2014: 2nd in Quiksilver Saquarema Prime in Saquarema (Brazil)
- 2016: winner in Quiksilver Pro France in Hossegor (France)

=== Victories ===
WCT Wins
Year	Event	Venue	Country
2016	Quiksilver Pro France	Hossegor, Nouvelle-Aquitaine	France
WQS Wins
Year	Event	Venue	Country
2023	Local Motion Surf Into Summer	Ala Moana Bowls, Oahu	Hawaii
2022	Jack's Surfboards Pro	Huntington Beach, California	United States
2017	Vans Pro	Virginia Beach, Virginia	United States
2017	Barbados Surf Pro	Soup Bowl, Bathsheba	Barbados
2017	Komunity Project Great Lakes Pro	Boomerang Beach, NSW	Australia

== Training ==
Keanu's training has included advanced deceleration techniques, improved body control through rotational plyometrics, total body explosiveness and heat-specific conditioning.
