= Miguel Pupo =

Brazilian surfer

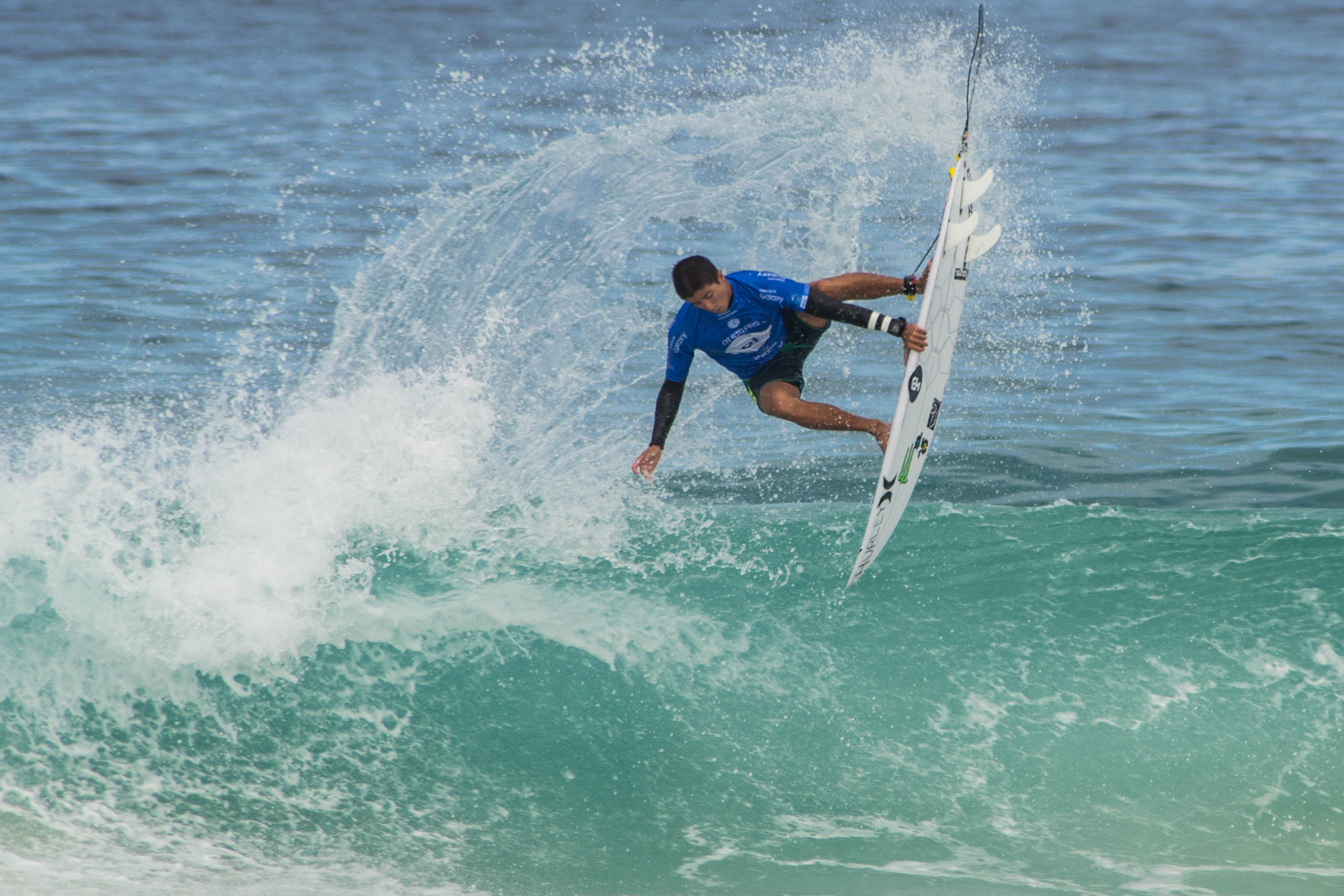

Personal information
- Born: November 19, 1991 (age 34) Itanhaém, SP, Brazil
- Height: 5 ft 9 in (1.75 m)
- Weight: 160 lb (73 kg)

Surfing career
- Sport: Surfing
- Best year: 2022 – Ranked No. 6 WSL CT World Tour
- Sponsors: Mormaii, Oceandrop, Cooperfrigu, Layback, Redoma Capital, Silverbay e Refugio de Maresias
- Major achievements: WSL Championship Tour event wins: 3

Surfing specifications
- Stance: Goofy
- Shaper: JS Industries Surfboards

Miguel Pupo (born November 19, 1991, in Itanhaém, São Paulo) is a Brazilian professional surfer who is in the World Surf League.

== Career ==
Miguel started on the circuit competing in the Qualifying Series in 2008. In 2011, he won his first 2 stages of the Qs, and competed for the first time on the WSL World Circuit. Since 2012 he has been a member of the elite of World Surfing. His best result was in 2022 when he ranked sixth in the World Ranking and almost participated in the WSL Finals. He also won his first stage at the CT in Teahupoo, when he beat Frenchman Kauli Vaast in the decision.

In the 2023 season, Miguel competed in the first three CT events, but was out of the last 2 before the mid-season cut due to injury. Because of the injury and his history on the CT, he received the Season Wildcard for the 2024 season. In the next season, he was eliminated from the CT in the mid-season cut, but finished 6th place in the Challenger Series that same year and returned to the CT.

== Career Victories ==
WCT Wins
Year	Event	Venue	Country
2026	Lexus Trestles Pro	Trestles, California	United States
2026	Rip Curl Pro Bells Beach	Bells Beach, Victoria	Australia
2022	Outerknown Tahiti Pro	Teahupo'o, Tahiti	French Polynesia
WQS Wins
Year	Event	Venue	Country
2023	Circuito Banco do Brasil de Surfe - Praia da Grama	Itupeva, São Paulo	Brazil
2019	ABANCA Galicia Classic Surf Pro	Playa de Pantin, Galicia	Spain
2015	São Paulo Open Surfing	Maresias, São Paulo	Brazil
2012	Hang Loose Fernando de Noronha Pro	Fernando de Noronha, Pernambuco	Brazil
2011	O'Neill Coldwater Classic Santa Cruz	Santa Cruz, California	United States
2011	Nike Lowers Pro	San Clemente, California	United States
