= Kolohe Andino =

American surfer

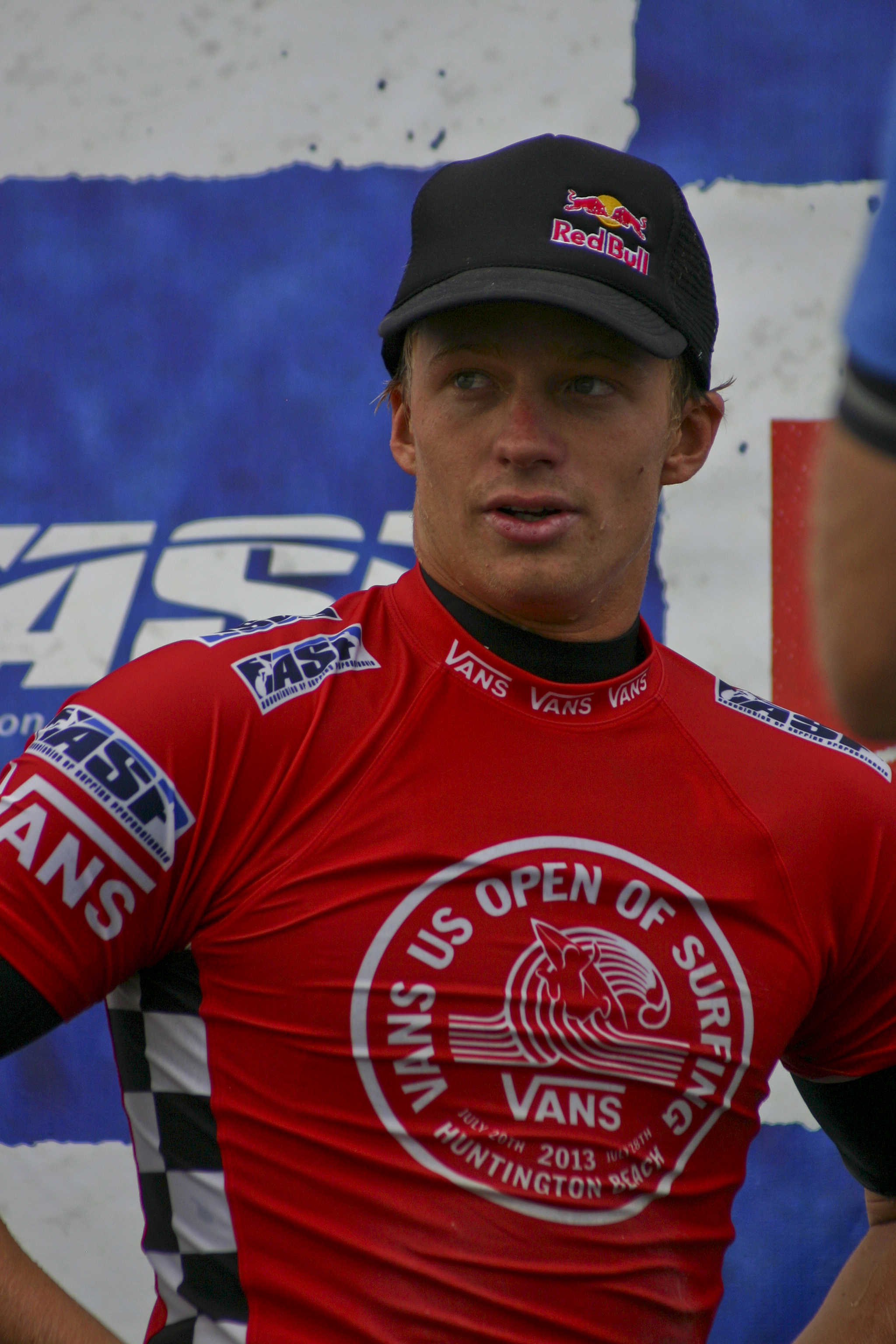
- Andino at the 2013 US Open of Surfing

Personal information
- Nickname: Brother
- Born: March 22, 1994 (age 32) San Clemente, California, U.S.
- Height: 5 ft 11 in (180 cm)
- Weight: 174 lb (79 kg)

Surfing career
- Sport: Surfing
- Best year: 2016 – Ranked No. 4 WSL CT World Tour
- Sponsors: FCS traction and fins

Surfing specifications
- Stance: Regular (natural foot)
- Shaper: Matt Biolos
- Quiver: 5 11" x 18.88 x 2.25
- Favorite waves: Rags Right
Medal record
Men's surfing
Representing United States
World Games
Gold medal – first place	2022 Huntington Beach	Team
Silver medal – second place	2019 Miyazaki	Men
Silver medal – second place	2019 Miyazaki	Team

Kolohe Andino (born March 22, 1994) is an American surfer. Andino began surfing at a young age and holds the record for winning the most National Scholastic Surfing Association (NSSA) titles of any male competitor, becoming the youngest to win one at age 15 in 2009. His breakthrough happened in 2011 after he won the Vans Pier Classic and the ASP 6-Star Quiksilver Brazil Open of Surfing. In 2019, Andino qualified to represent the United States at the 2020 Summer Olympics in surfing.

His name, Kolohe, means "little rascal" in Hawaiian.

== Surfing career ==
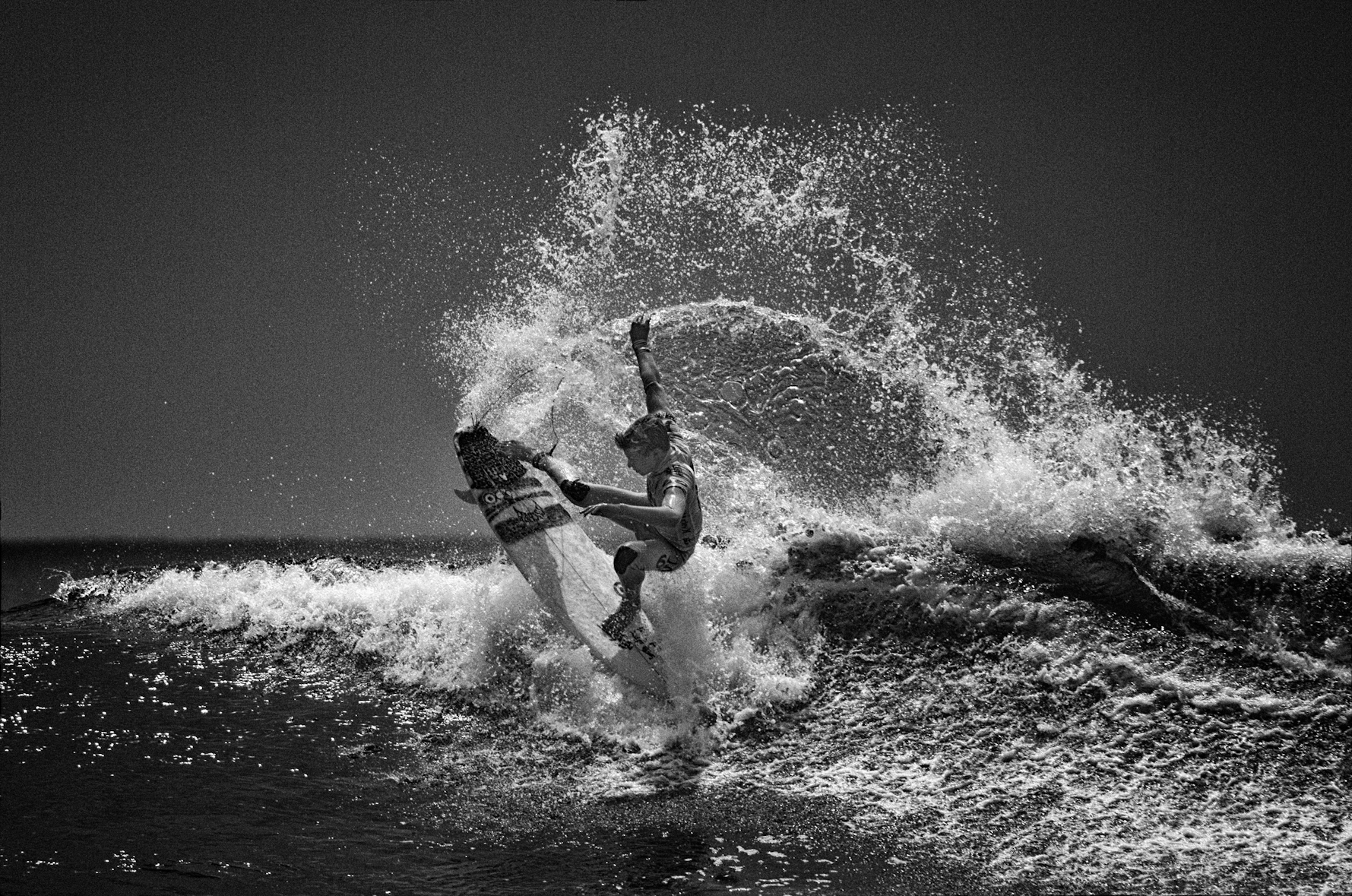
Andino at the 2011 US Open of Surfing

Son of top-ranked surfer, Dino Andino, Kolohe Andino began surfing at a young age as he followed his father on surfing trips; by age 8, Andino had already begun fielding sponsors who wished to represent him. By high school, he had retained professional surfer Mike Parsons as his coach and at age 15, Andino became the youngest winner of an National Scholastic Surfing Association (NSSA) title and holds the record for the most NSSA championships won by a male competitor, at nine overall. That same year, Andino also won two USA Surfing championship titles at the Lower Trestles in the Under 16 and Under 18 competitions.

Andino's breakthrough event happened in 2011 when he won both the ASP 6-Star Quiksilver Brazil Open of Surfing and the Vans Pier Classic world tour events. On January 8, 2015, he triumphed in the first-ever World Surf League (WSL) event, the World Surf League Surf City Pro held in Huntington Beach, California.

In 2019, Andino qualified to represent the United States at the 2020 Summer Olympics for surfing by finishing as one of the top two Americans at the 2019 World Surf League, and one of the top ten surfers overall.

Andino is the first U.S. surfer ever to have qualified for the Olympic games. At the Olympics, he was eliminated in the quarterfinal round by Japan's Kanoa Igarashi.

In February 2021, while preparing for the year's WSL competitive season, Andino sprained his right ankle and re-aggravated the injury the following month, forcing him to require surgery and withdraw from the Australia leg of the tour. Kolohe only took part in events again at the last event of the year, the Corona Open Mexico.

For the 2022 season, because of his injury and his record on the Tour, he received the WSL Season Wildcard. He finished the season in 20th place. In the 2023 season, Kolohe didn't have good results and didn't reclassify for the following season. Since then he has continued in the WSL in smaller events, but without returning to the Championship Tour.

== Personal life ==
Andino married his wife, Madison Aldrich, in San Clemente, California on January 7, 2018. The couple was expecting their first child in 2021.

== Career Victories ==
WQS Wins
Year	Event	Venue	Country
2023	Coastal Edge ECSC Pro produced by the Virginia Beach Jaycees	Virginia Beach, Virginia	United States
2022	O'Neill Cold Water Classic	Santa Cruz, California	United States
2015	Allianz Billabong Pro Cascais	Guincho, Cascais	Portugal
2015	Hurley Australian Open	Manly Beach, New South Wales	Australia
2015	Shoe City Pro	Huntington Beach, California	United States
2011	Fantastic Noodles Kangaroo Island Pro	Kingscote, South Australia	Australia
2011	Quiksilver Brazil Open of Surfing	Rio de Janeiro, Rio de Janeiro	United States
2011	Super Surf International	Ubatuba, Sao Paulo	Brazil
2011	Coastal Edge ECSC	Virginia Beach, Virginia	United States
2011	Vans Pier Classic presented by Jack's Surfboards	Huntington Beach, California	United States
Juniors Wins
Year	Event	Venue	Country
2011	Vans Pro Junior	Huntington Beach, California	United States
