= Shane Dorian =

American surfer (born 1972)

- Born: July 19, 1972 (age 53); Kailua-Kona, Hawaii, U.S.
- Occupations: Surfer, actor
- Surfing career
- Years active: 1992–present
- Height: 5 ft 8 in (173 cm)
- Weight: 155 lb (70 kg)
- Sport: Surfing
- Best year: Ranked fourth on the ASP World Tour: 2000
- Career earnings: $415,050 (as of 2014)
- Sponsors: Billabong, JC Surfboards, Dragon (sunglasses), Freestyle (watches), Reef (sandles), Monster (energy drink), OAM (fins)
- Major achievements: Fourth overall on World championship tour (WCT) surfing in 2000; Surf Industry Manufacturers Association (SIMA)'s "Waterman of the Year"

Surfing specifications
- Stance: Regular (natural foot)
- Shaper: John Carper
- Quiver: 5'9", square tail (shortboard); 6'3", pin tail (8-10ft waves); 6'9" (10-15ft waves); 7'3" (16-20ft waves); 9'8", big wave gun (20-40ft waves); 10'6", gun (40-60ft waves)
- Favorite waves: Pipeline, Jaws (Hawaii), Tavarua Cloudbreak (Fiji)
- Favorite maneuvers: Barrels, Big Waves, Tubes

Patrick Shane Dorian (born July 19, 1972), or "Shane", is an American surfer from Kailua-Kona, Hawaii. He spent 11 years touring on the World Championship Tour as a professional surfer. Dorian quit competition surfing in 2003 to focus on big waves. He is currently a big wave surfer and one of the best in the world at big wave riding.

== Early life ==
Dorian was born to Patrick and Susan, who had a restaurant called "Dorian's" on the beach. Dorian attended Konawaena High School in Kealakekua, Hawaii.

=== Personal life ===
Dorian lives in Holualoa, Hawaii with his wife Lisa, his son, and his daughter. He enjoys taking care of an orchard that consists of 110 fruit trees at an elevation of 4000 feet above sea level.

=== Surfing career ===
Dorian started out on a bodyboard alongside friend, and future bodyboarder champion, Mike Stewart. Dorian received his first surfboard, from his dad, on his fifth birthday. He soon abandoned the bodyboard to focus on surfing.

In 1987, Dorian had his first major success at the Gotcha Pro competition at Sandy Beach. He was able to beat some big names, made it through four rounds, and received some media exposure. Since 1995, Dorian has directed the Shane Dorian Keiki Classic for surfers 17 and under. Dorian has been a long-time member of the Billabong U.S. surf team, his main sponsor.

== World Championship Tour ==
Dorian joined the ASP World Tour in 1993, where he hovered outside of the top 10 for a number of years before a fourth-place world finish in 2000. He has also won a number of events in his career, including the Rip Curl Pro in 1999 and the 2000 Billabong Pro at Mundaka. In 2004, Dorian retired from the WTC tour, but not from a being a professional; choosing to focus on becoming a better surfer.

After retirement, Dorian started to concentrate on big wave surfing, mainly towing into big waves via jet ski, which was the norm then. However, over the years, he and his fellow big wave surfers have preferred paddling into big waves. Dorian took the top prize at the 2008 Global Big Wave awards in California.

In 2011, Dorian was awarded "Ride of the Year" by the World Surf League for paddling into a giant Peahi "Jaws" barrel on 3-15-2011 estimated to be 57 feet tall by the World Surf League, and biggest wave ever paddled into at that time.

== Surfing statistics ==
- 2001 – 2nd place - Quiksilver in Memory of Eddie Aikau big-wave contest (Waimea Bay, Oahu)
- 2000 – 4th ranked overall on World Championship Tour (WCT)
- 2000 – 1st place - Billabong Pro (France/Spain)
- 1999 – 1st place - Rip Curl Pro (Australia)
- 1998 – 2nd place - Rip Curl World Cup (WQS-Hawaii), Billabong Challenge (Specialty-Australia)
- 1996 – 1st place - O'Neill Surf Challenge (WQS-France)
- 1994 – 1st place - Nescau Surf Energy (World Qualification Series: WQS-Brazil)

== Awards ==
- 2016 – WSL Big Wave Awards: Surfline Best Overall Performance
- 2016 – WSL Big Wave Awards: Billabong Ride of the Year for his big wave ride on Jaws in Peahi, Hawaii
- 2015 – WSL Big Wave Awards: Surfline Best Overall Performance
- 2015 – WSL Big Wave Awards: Billabong Ride of the Year for his big wave ride on Puerto Escondido, (Mexico)
- 2013 – WSL Big Wave Awards: Billabong XXL Ride of the Year and Pacifico Tube - May 3, 2013 for his big wave ride on Jaws/Peahi (Peahi, Hawaii)
- 2012 – WSL Big Wave Awards: Waterman of the Year by the Surf Industry Manufacturers' Association
- 2011 – WSL Big Wave Awards: Billabong XXL Monster Paddle Award - March 15, 2011 for his big wave ride on Jaws in Peahi, Hawaii
- 2011 – WSL Big Wave Awards: Billabong XXL Monster Tube - March 15, 2011 for his tube-ride in Maui, Hawaii
- 2010 – WSL Big Wave Awards: Billabong XXL Men's Overall Performance Award
- 2006 – WSL Big Wave Awards:

Billabong XXL Monster Tube Award – September 11, 2005 for his big wave ride in Teahupoo, Tahiti

- 2005 – WSL Big Wave Awards:

Billabong XXL (Global Big Wave Awards) Surfline/Jay Moriarity Best Overall Performance Award

- 2000 – 2nd place - Surfer Magazine Readers Poll Awards (runner-up to his friend and fellow professional surfer Kelly Slater)

== Filmography ==
- In God's Hands (1998), with Surfers Matt George and Matty Liu
- Thicker Than Water (2000) a surf film by Jack Johnson and the Malloys.
- The Blueprint (2005)
- Solid: The Two Days That Teahupoo Blew Minds (2005)
- Campaign 2 (2005)
- A Fly in the Champagne (2009)
- Momentum Generation (2018)

In the documentary Solid: The Two Days That Teahupoo Blew Minds, fellow surfers gave him a standing ovation for his wave conquering rides.

=== Television ===
Dorian is featured in an ESPN on ABC television series three-part special called World of X-Games: Big Wave Hellmen that premiered on October 26, 2014, and ran until November 9, 2014. It follows Shane along with five of his Big Wave Hellmen competitors: Grant "Twiggy" Baker, Ryan "Hippo" Hipwood, Mark Healey and Greg Long touring the biggest and best big wave breaks in the world competing for the big wave world title. A panel of judgeds, one will be crowned "Big Wave Hellmen of the Year". They spent a year around the globe chasing monster swells to hunt down and ride the most dangerous waves they could find. And in the end, determined by a panel of expert judges, who include legendary big wave surfers, Greg Noll and Mike Parsons, and author of Ghost Wave: The Discovery of Cortes Bank Chris Dixon, one will be crowned "Big Wave Hellmen of the Year".

The series featured some of the biggest wave destinations in the world, including: Belharra Reef off the coast of Saint-Jean-de-Luz, France, Cortes Bank off the coast of San Diego, Jaws in Peahi, Hawaii, Mavericks in Northern California, Cowie Bombie near Margaret River, Western Australia, "The Rights" further south in Western Australia, Pico Alto in Punta Hermosa, Lima, Peru and Puerto Escondido in Oaxaca, Mexico.

== Invention ==
In December 2010, Dorian had a terrifying wipeout at Mavericks in a two-wave hold-down that almost killed him. The incident motivated Shane to design surfing's first "safety suit" to be inflated with a CO2 cartridge in a wetsuit vest during a potentially deadly hold-down. He helped develop the final product that is capable of instantly "torpedoing" a trapped-underwater surfer back to the surface when inflated.
