= Maya Gabeira =

Brazilian big wave surfer

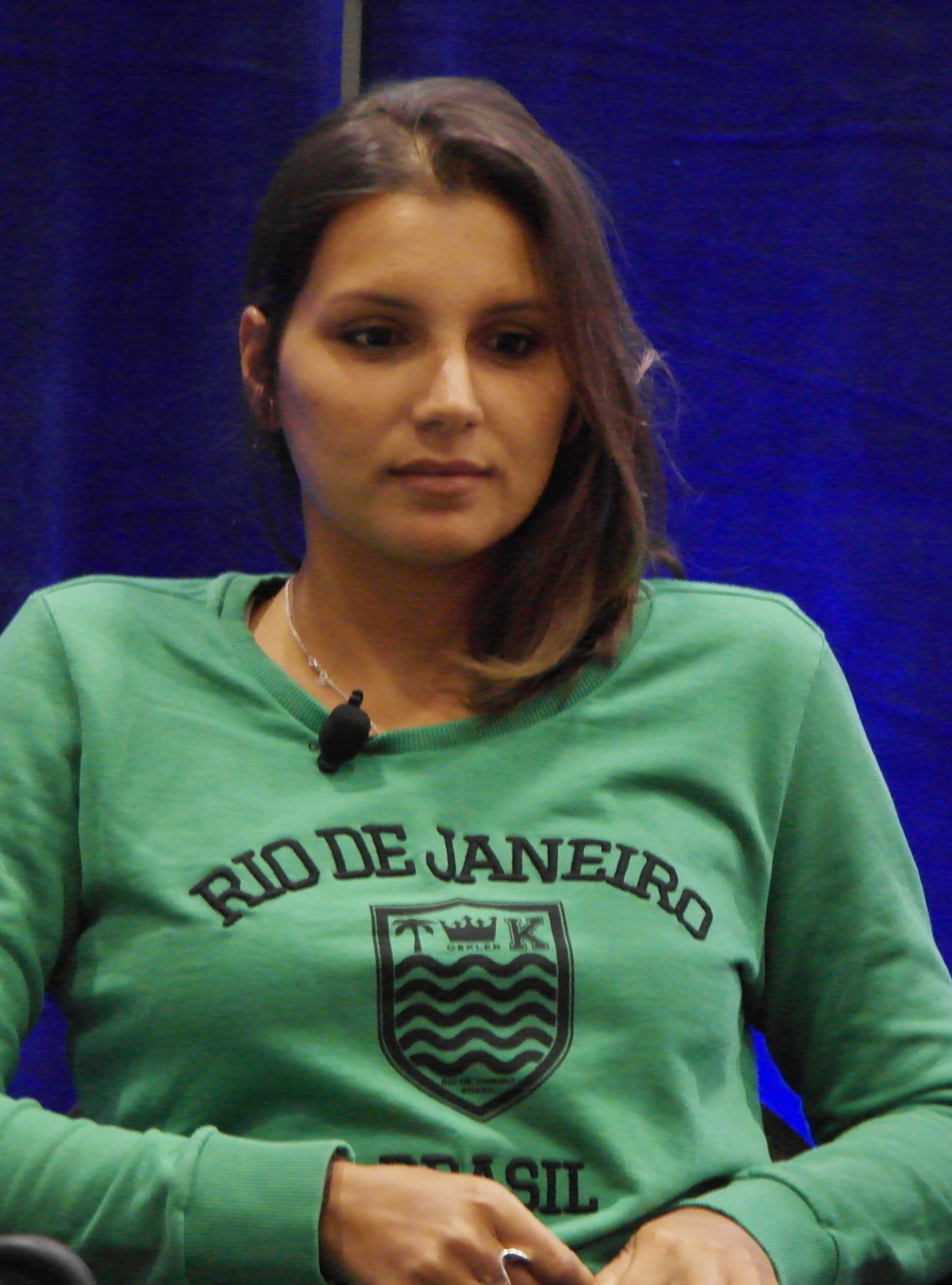
- Gabeira in 2014

Personal information
- Born: Maya Reis Gabeira; April 10, 1987 (age 39) Rio de Janeiro, Brazil
- Height: 1.68 m (5.5 ft)
- Weight: 56 kg (123 lb)

Surfing career
- Sport: Surfing
- Major achievements: Billabong XXL Global Big Wave Award (2007, 2008, 2009, 2010, 2012); ESPY Award (Best Female Action Sports Athlete (2009); Teen Choice Awards 2010

Maya Reis Gabeira (born April 10, 1987) is a Brazilian big wave surfer. She surfed a 73.5 ft (22.4 m) high wave in Nazaré, Portugal, in February 2020, recorded by Guinness World Records as the biggest wave ever surfed by a woman. She also held the previous record for biggest wave ever surfed by a woman, of 68 ft (20.7 m) established in January 2018.

Gabeira has received numerous accolades including the ESPY award for Best Female Action Sports Athlete.

== Career ==
Gabeira started surfing at age 13 in Rio de Janeiro and started competing at 15 years old. In 2004, she decided to become a professional at 17 while living in Australia and moved to Hawaii that same year to surf world class waves, while working as a waitress.

She quickly emerged as the world's top female big-wave surfer, winning global championships surfing challenging spots like Mavericks, Waimea, Todos Santos, and South Africa's shark-infested "Dungeons".

She has won the Billabong XXL Global Big Wave Awards for four consecutive times (2007 to 2010) in the Best Female Performance category.

In 2008, she became the first woman to surf big waves in Alaska. Gabeira also became the first woman to surf California's Ghost Trees and Tahiti's Teahupoo.

In 2009, Gabeira won the ESPY award for Best Female Action Sports Athlete. Later that year, Gabeira surfed the biggest wave ever by a woman when she successfully rode a 14 m (45.9 ft) wave at Dungeons, a big-wave surf spot in South Africa.

In 2010, she got the 2010 Teen Choice Award for Best Female Action Sports Star.

In 2012, she was awarded the XXL Big Wave Awards for Girls Best Overall Performance for the 5th time. She also appeared in the ESPN The Body Issue that same year.

On October 28, 2013, Gabeira lost consciousness and nearly drowned while surfing a massive wave at Praia do Norte, Nazaré, Portugal; she was saved by her fellow Brazilian big-wave surfer Carlos Burle. She had to be revived on the beach and was taken to hospital. In 2016, the documentary Return to Nazaré by Red Bull TV showed Gabeira's returned to Nazaré after the accident.

In January 2018, Gabeira surfed a 68 ft (20.7 m) wave in Nazare, recorded by Guinness World Records as the biggest wave surfed by a woman.

In February 11, 2020, Gabeira set a new Guinness World Record for the Largest wave surfed (unlimited) - female. It was held in WSL Nazaré Tow Surfin contest and the wave measured 22.4 m (73.5 ft).

She is the subject of the 2022 documentary film Maya and the Wave.

In 2022, she was named UNESCO Champion for Ocean and Youth.

In 2025, Gabeira announced that she was retiring from professional big wave surfing.

== Books ==
Gabeira is the author of three books:

Maya and the Beast (2022). Children's book. ISBN 978-1647005993

Maya Makes Waves: A Picture Book (2024). Children's book. ISBN 978-1647006006

Beyond the Board: The Untold Story of the World's Most Daring Big Wave Surfer (2025). Memoir. ISBN 978-1647006013

== Personal life ==
Gabeira is the daughter of Fernando Gabeira, one of the founding members of the Green Party of Brazil. Her father is the son of Lebanese immigrants. Her mother, Yamê Reis, is a Brazilian fashion designer.

Her former boyfriend and tow partner, Sebastian Steudtner, is also a big-wave surfer, and as of 2025 holds the world record for the tallest wave ever surfed. She continues to support him as a surf partner.

Gabeira revealed in an interview in 2021 that she had suffered from anxiety for years, and was only diagnosed after an aunt gave her an anti-anxiety pill that made her feel better, leading her to seek professional help.
