= Greg Long (surfer) =

American surfer (born 1983)

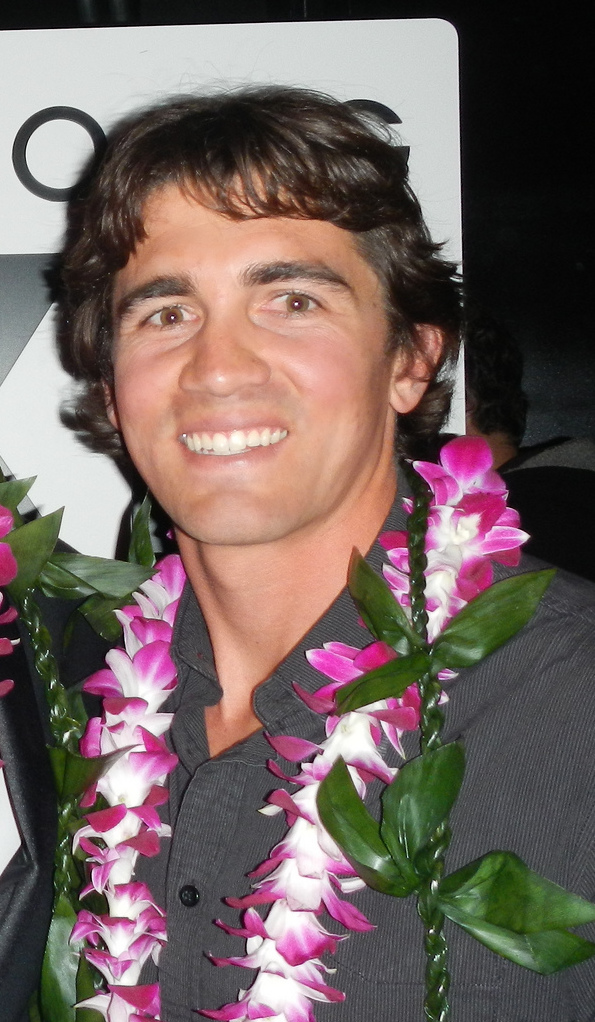
- Long in 2012

Personal information
- Born: May 25, 1983 (age 43) San Clemente, California, U.S.
- Years active: 1996–Present

Surfing career
- Sport: Surfing
- Sponsors: Patagonia, Von Zipper, Ocean Minded
- Major achievements: 2001 NSSA National Championship winner 2003 Red Bull Big Wave Africa winner 2008 Mavericks Surf Contest; 2009 Quiksilver Big Wave Invitational winner 2009 Quiksilver in Memory of Eddie Aikau big-wave contest

Surfing specifications
- Stance: Regular (natural) foot (left foot forward)
- Favorite waves: Mavericks, Todos Santos, Cortes Bank, Pipeline, Hitchcock's, Trestles
- Favorite maneuvers: Barrels, Big Waves, Tubes

Greg Long (born May 25, 1983) is an American surfer from San Clemente, California. He has won the Quiksilver Big Wave Invitational, in memory of Eddie Aikau at Waimea Bay, the Red Bull Titans of Mavericks event held at Mavericks in Northern California, and the Red Bull Big Wave Africa event held at Dungeons in Hout Bay, South Africa. Additionally, he is the most decorated surfer in the Billabong XXL Global Big Wave Awards. He is widely regarded as one of the best big wave surfers in the world.

== Surfing career ==
Born and raised in San Clemente, Greg and his brother Rusty Long were introduced to the ocean at an early age by their father, who was a lifeguard. At the age of 16, Greg moved to San Diego where he lived with his older cousin David Long who surfed with Greg and helped progress his skills. Greg surfed the waves at Trestles, California at an early age and was highly regarded throughout the community as an up-and-coming star. At 17, Greg won the NSSA National Men's Open Title in 2001, and looked to have a promising career in competitive surfing. But, Greg's passion for big surf forced him to leave the professional circuit and focus entirely on traveling the world in search of biggest waves.

At age 15, Long first paddled out to what eventually would be his home big wave break, an island off the coast of Baja California called Todos Santos. There, he honed his big wave skills throughout his teen years and had many sessions with big wave rider Mike Parsons. After surfing Todos for a couple years, Long took his big wave act to spots such as Mavericks, in Northern California, and Dungeon's, in Cape Town, South Africa. He won the Red Bull Big Wave Africa at Dungeon's in 2003 at age 19. The win officially put him on the big wave map, and he has since been a standout on every huge swell all over the world.

On January 5, 2008, Long and fellow riders Brad Gerlach, Mike Parsons, and Grant "Twiggy" Baker towed into waves at the Cortes Bank off the coast of San Diego, on the swell of the decade, that were estimated to be around 60–80 feet on the face. Greg was credited by the other surfers and photographers as riding the "wave of the day" on something approaching 90 feet tall, but it was not photographed and thus not recognized. This is according to the book "Ghost Wave" by Chris Dixon. That same year, Long won the Mavericks surf contest in 20-foot (6.1 m) surf. In June 2008, he signed a sponsorship deal with Billabong.

Long's biggest career achievement came in December 2009, when he won the Quiksilver Big Wave Invitational in 40-foot (12 m) surf at the North Shore's Waimea Bay. There, he took down ten-time world champion Kelly Slater and a host of the world's best big wave riders. Long also won the 2009 Quiksilver in Memory of Eddie Aikau big-wave contest on Waimea Bay, Oahu.

On January 4, 2012, Greg Long, along with his fellow big wave surfers Ian Walsh, Kohl Christensen, Jeff Rowley, Dave Wassel, Shane Dorian, Mark Healey, Carlos Burle, Nate Fletcher, Garrett McNamara, Kai Barger, North Shore locals and others visited the Hawaiian Islands for a day of surfing. Later that year, the Hollywood film he provided stunt surfing for, Chasing Mavericks, premiered.

Long has been known for caring more for the spirit of big wave surfing than the sponsorship deals, media attention, and contest wins. At the Mavericks Contest in 2008, for example, Long agreed to split the prize money among himself and the five other finalists. He is also known for pressing the limits of paddle-in surfing, paddling into many waves which were once deemed unrideable without the help of a jet ski. Long was included as an actor and adviser in the Hollywood film Chasing Mavericks, and was featured as the star of a documentary about the psychology of big wave surfing.

== Other projects ==
Long uses his celebrity to donate to charity organizations, and is involved in the Surfrider Foundation, Wildcoast, Parley For The Oceans and Save the Waves. Also, Long focused his efforts on Baja, Mexico, when a natural gas facility ruined a classic big wave surf spot in the area.

Long was in a relationship with a Canadian-born snowboarder. Some time between late 2023 and early 2024, the two are no longer together.

== Awards ==
- 2016 – WSL Big Wave World Tour Champion
- 2014 – Billabong XXL Ride of the Year - May 2, 2014 for his big wave ride at Puerto Escondido, Mexico
- 2013 – Billabong XXL Surfline Men's Performance Award
- 2013 – Billabong XXL Ride of the Year - third place at Jaws, Maui, Hawaii on October 10, 2012
- 2012 - Big Wave World Tour Champion
- 2011 – Surf Industry Manufacturer's Association (SIMA) Waterman of the Year
- 2009 - Billabong Pico Alto Winner at Punta Hermosa, Lima, Peru
- 2008 - Mavericks Surf Contest Winner at Half Moon Bay, California, United States of America
- 2008 – Billabong XXL Performer of the Year Award
- 2007 – Billabong XXL Best Tow-In Wave of the Year
- 2007 – Billabong XXL Global Big Wave Awards Biggest Paddle In Wave

== Filmography ==
- Chasing Mavericks (2012), stunts
- Sine Qua Non: The Psychology of Big Wave Surfing with Greg Long (2013)
- Big Wave Hellmen (2014)
