= Carlos Burle =

Brazilian surfer

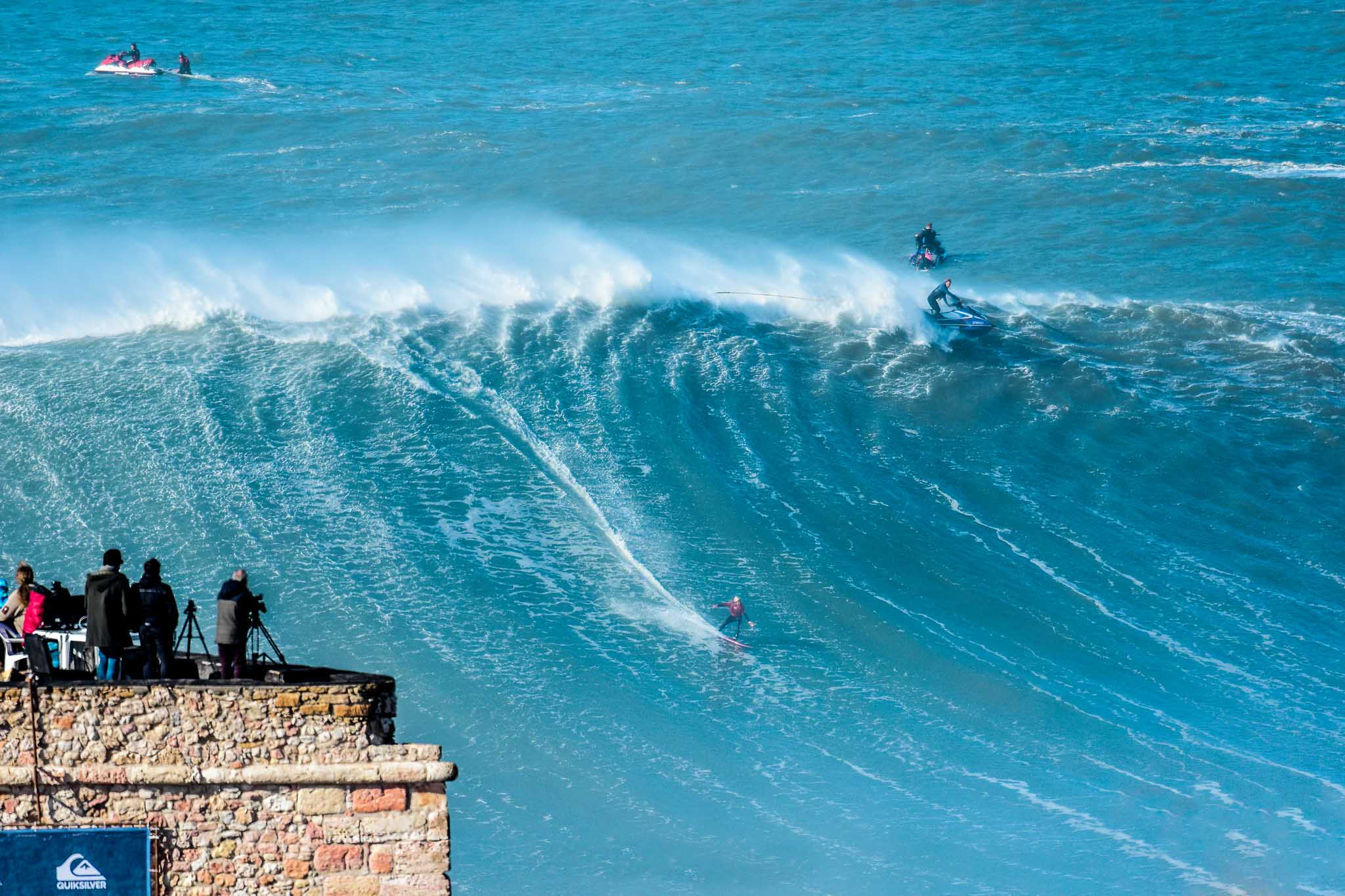
- Big wave surfing at Nazaré, Portugal

Personal information
- Born: November 9, 1967 (age 58) Recife, Brazil
- Height: 1.72 m (5.6 ft)
- Weight: 67 kg (148 lb)
- Website: https://carlosburle.com

Surfing career
- Sport: Surfing
- Major achievements: Champion, Big-Wave World Championship at Todos Santos, Mexico (1998); Champion, Big Wave World Tour (2010)

Carlos Burle (born November 9, 1967) is a retired Brazilian surfer and 2x world champion in big wave surfing. In November, 2001 he set the world record for the tallest measured wave ever surfed, at 68 ft (20.7 m). He was one of the pioneers of tow-in surfing, a technique which allows for surfing bigger waves. In 2013 he rode a wave with an apparent height of 100 ft (30.5 m), which would have been the tallest wave ever ridden if verified. Burle has been described as Brazil's "first-ever big wave freesurfer".

== Career ==
Burle was born in Recife, Pernambuco, Brazil. He said that as a boy, even though there was a lot of love from his parents, his father told him that if he followed surfing he would end up picking garbage off the street, because surfing wasn't a profession he could live from. He began surfing professionally nonetheless in 1987.

In 1998, he won his first big international tournament, the Big Wave World Championship in Todos Santos Bay, Mexico.

In 1999, he fractured a vertebra after smashing into a reef at Backdoor, on the North Shore of Oʻahu, Hawaii.

In November 2001, at Mavericks, California, Burle surfed the largest wave ever recorded at the time, measuring 68 ft (20.7 m). This was only possible thanks to tow-in surfing, a technique he helped introduce to the sport.. His tow partner was fellow Brazilian big wave rider Eraldo Gueiros.

In 2003, he and three other athletes surfed a series of tidal waves, known as the Pororoca, on the Amazon River. The Pororoca is a tidal bore which can reach 4 meters height and flow up to 13 km upstream on the Amazon River from its mouth under certain conditions.

In 2003, at Jaws on the north shore of Maui, he fractured his sacrum, L1 vertebra, and broke his left hip, requiring four months on crutches.

In 2010, Burle won the inaugural Big Wave World Tour for the 2009/2010 season. The tour consisted of four competitions, the Quiksilver Ceremonial Punta de Lobos in Chile, the Billabong Pico Alto Invitational in Peru, the Maverick's Surf Contest in California, and Todos Santos Big Wave Event in Mexico.

List of top 10 placements in competitions (2009-2016):

- 2009:
  - 4th place, Todos Santos Big Wave Event
  - 5th place, Mavericks Surf Contest
  - 2nd place, Billabong Pico Alto
  - 5th place, Quiksilver Ceremonial Chile
- 2010:
  - 7th place, Nelscott Reef Classic
  - 3rd place, Billabong Pico Alto
  - 9th place, Quiksilver Ceremonial Chile
- 2012:
  - 1st place, Billabong Pico Alto
- 2014:
  - 7th place, Billabong Pico Alto
- 2015:
  - 3rd place, Todos Santos Challenge
- 2016:
  - 2nd place, Nazaré Challenge
  - 4th place, Puerto Escondido Challenge

On October 28, 2013, at age 45, Burle surfed a wave in Nazaré, Portugal which was judged to be 100 ft (30.5 m) tall. The wave would have been the tallest measured wave ever surfed if verified. On the same day, he was with fellow Brazilian surfer Maya Gabeira when she was knocked unconscious by the strong waves and nearly drowned. Burle was involved in rescuing her and dragging her to shore, where she was given medical attention on the beach before being taken to hospital. She suffered a broken ankle but no serious injuries.

In 2018, at the age of 50, he retired from professional surfing at the 2018 Nazaré Challenge in Portugal. His protégé, Lucas Chumbo, won the competition at the same event.

In 2019, at age 50, he was a finalist for the XXL Awards, in the tow-in category "Ride of the Year", at Jaws, Hawaii.

On December 3, 2025, Burle suffered a severe wipeout and was nearly drowned by a massive wave at Nazaré. He was saved by fellow surfers Lucas Chumbo and Will Santana, who were able to pull him from the water and tow him to safety.

He has been sponsored by Redley, Red Bull, Mitsubishi, DoBem and Mormaii.

He has been a coach and mentor to professional big wave surfer Lucas Chumbo.

== Personal life ==
Burle's partner is Ligia Kuntz Moura. He has several children. He lives in Rio de Janeiro and Hawaii.
