= Makua Rothman =

American surfer and musician

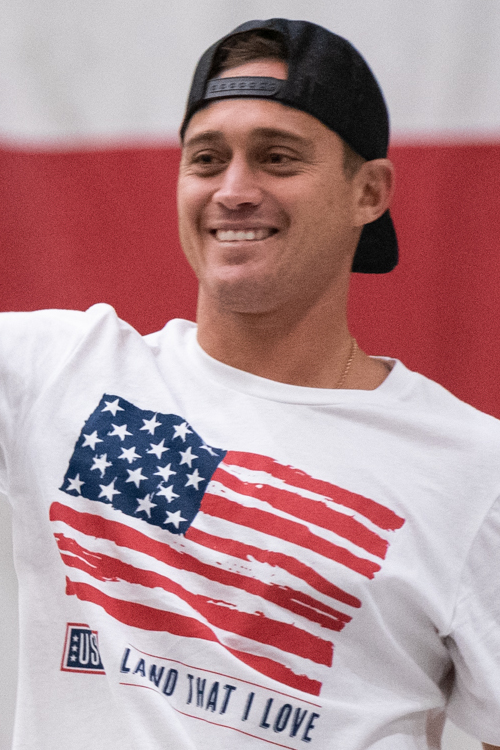
Makua Rothman at Bagram Airfield in 2019

Makuakai Rothman (born June 17, 1984) is an American big wave rider, professional surfer and musician. On February 28, 2015, he was crowned the 2015 Big Wave World Champion in the World Surf League's (WSL) first sanctioned Big Wave World Tour (BWWT).

The Honolulu Star-Advertiser reported that on January 16, 2021, Rothman rode what it called "the biggest wave ever ridden in Hawaii", estimated to be 100 feet tall, at Jaws on the island of Maui.

== Life and career ==
Rothman is Jewish, born to a Portuguese father and a Hawaiian mother, on the North Shore of Oahu, Hawaii. He attended Kahuku High School in Kahuku, Hawaii, playing soccer, football, baseball, karate, and water polo.

An accomplished professional big wave surfer and aspiring musician, Rothman was crowned the 2015 Big Wave World Champion. Rothman achieved a milestone in surfing at age 18 when he won the 2003 Billabong XXL Award for riding a 66-foot wave at Jaws on November 26, 2002 (the largest wave known to be surfed anywhere in the world that winter).

Rothman credits his surfing ability in large part to his father, Eddie Rothman. As a child, Rothman suffered from asthma, making surfing a personally difficult and dangerous pursuit. His father decided to involve him in various sports such as soccer, baseball, football, and water polo as strenuous workouts seemed to help relieve his asthma. Rothman later attributed his physical stamina and dedication to these pursuits.

Before he was 10 years old, Rothman was surfing some of Hawaii's most notable and biggest waves, including Pipeline and Sunset Beach. When he was eight, he surfed 12-foot Waimea waves, an unusual feat for a young boy, one that helped prepare him for his later big-wave accomplishments. By the time he was 13, Rothman was known as a promising young surfer in the surfing community. Surrounded by accomplished older surfers such as Sunny Garcia, Myles Padaca, Johnny Boy Gomes, and Dane Kealoha, Rothman learned how to dive, surf, farm, and hunt. He credits these men as role models who instilled values of leadership and respect.

=== Music career ===
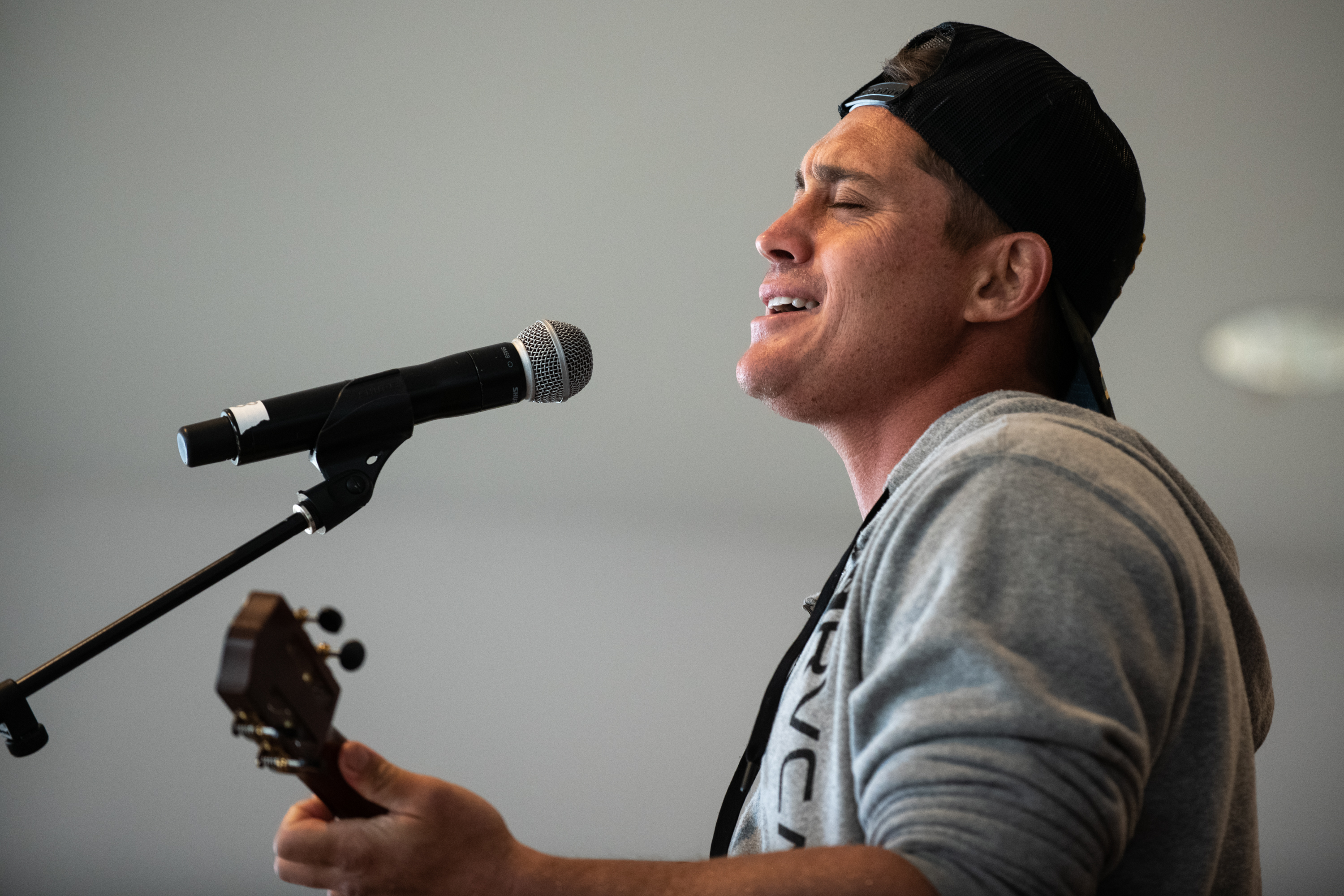
Makua Rothman performing on a USO tour at Ramstein Air Base in 2019

Rothman had not considered music as a career until 2012, when his friend Rob Garcia told him that people should hear his music. On the verge of leaving for a trip to Indonesia, Rothman decided to cancel the trip to work on his music. A few months later, he released his first EP, Makanale Road. Since then, he’s released a full-length album in 2013, Sound Wave, and toured all over the US, headlining small shows and opening for artists such as Matisyahu, Sublime w/Rome, Common Kings, The Wailers, Steel Pulse, Slightly Stoopid, Rebelution, and Donavon Frankenreiter. Sound Wave debuted as the #1 Billboard World Album on iTunes and peaked as the #1 Billboard Reggae Album on December 28, 2013.

In 2017, Rothman guest performed on Goldfinger's album The Knife, playing ukeke on "Liftoff". He has also partnered with Hawaiian youth organizations to create programs for local youth at-risk.

== Siblings ==
Rothman has two younger brothers, and a younger sister.

Koa Rothman, the middle brother of the Rothman siblings and ten years younger than Makua, is also an accomplished big wave pro surfer who first surfed big waves (Hawaiian system) at age 17. In 2014, at the age of 21, he won both the Best Tube Award from his ride at Teahupoo and the Billabong XXL Wipeout of the Year Award with his feat also at Teahupoo and on the same wave.

Rothman and his siblings have a Hawaii-based bagel business.

== Current sponsors ==
- RVCA
- SHADE Sunscreen
- Oakley (sunglasses)
- Monster Energy Drink

== Contests and tours ==
- 2002 Billabong XXL Big Wave Challenge Award - Winner
- 2006 Volcom Stone’s Blowfish Surf Series - 3rd Place
- 2006 Xcel Pro - Sunset Beach, Hawaii - 4th Place
- 2007 O'Neill World Cup - Sunset Beach, Hawaii - Winner
- 2014 Punta Galea Challenge - Bilbao, Basque Country, Spain - 2nd Place
- 2014 Billabong Pico Alto - Pico Alto, Punta Hermosa. Lima, Peru - Winner
- 2014-5 World Surf League (WSL) Big Wave World Tour (BWWT) Champion
- 2015 Quiksilver Ceremonial in pumping surf at Punta de Lobos, Chile - Winner

== See also ==
- List of Jewish surfers
