= Mark Visser =

Personal information
- Nationality: Australian
- Born: 9 March 1983 (age 43)
- Website: markvisser.net

Sport
- Country: Australia
- Sport: Big Wave Surfing and Ocean Adventure
- Events: Big Waves, Night Rider

Mark Robert Visser (born 9 March 1983) is an Australian professional big wave surfer, author, keynote speaker and ocean adventurer. Visser is best known for being the first person to surf Hawaii's most dangerous wave Jaws, Maui, at night in 2011. It was documented in a film called 'Night Rider'.

== Training ==
Visser coaches professional athletes from big wave inspired surf programs for water and land. These programs included training to overcome fear, deal with stressful situations in and out of the water, and submersion without oxygen. In addition to submersion without taking a breath, Visser can also hold his breath underwater for 6 minutes and 4 seconds.

== Career ==
Visser spent three years competing on the World Qualifying Series (WQS) ASP world tour before focusing on big wave surf events. Visser's past achievements include: 5th in the 2006/2007 APT tow-in tour event in Chile, 7th in the Nelscott Reef Big Wave Paddle in event United States, and runner up in the 2008/2009, 2009/2010, 2010/2011 and 2014/2015 Oakley ASL Big Wave Awards. His accomplishments were also recognized by the XXL awards for biggest wave ridden. Visser won the 2014/15 Big Wave Paddle-in ASL Big Wave Awards. In 2015-2016 Visser was selected as one of the eight world professional water athletes, to compete in the Ultimate Waterman contest. Visser ranked in the top 3 for the Short Board, Long Board, Big Wave/ Tube ridding event, 6 km Prone Paddle race, 18 km Waka Ama / OC1 race and the Underwater Strength Run and Swim event. In addition to his sports activities, Visser also gives keynote speeches to individuals, corporations, teams and organizations including TEDx Noosa. His goal is to inspire others by sharing his story.

=== Tasmania event ===
In July 2011, Visser, along with his brother Kevin and a group of local surfers James Hick, Marty Paradisis and Mike Brennan conquered waves as high as four meters during severe hailstorms. This particularly dangerous surfing trip prompted the surfers to paddle in, rather than tow.

== Works ==
=== Operation Night Rider ===
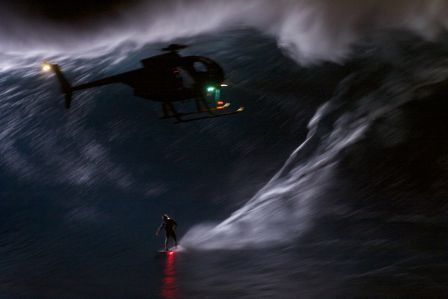
Mark Visser surfing Jaws, Maui at night

On 20 January, Visser became the first person to surf Jaws break in Maui at night. During this event known as the 'Night Rider', he rode 30–40-foot waves in dangerous outer reef, illuminated by engineered LED lights built into his buoyancy vest and integrated into his surfboard. This night ride is the start for an upcoming adventure documentary called 'Nine Lives' which Visser is currently working on. 'Operation Night Rider' with cooperation of cameraman Drew Llewellyn won an 'Australian Cinematography Award' in the category of 'Documentaries, Cinema & TV'.

=== Operation Deep Blue ===
Visser's second project documents him and his team as they parachute out of a specialized aircraft with their jet skis and surfboard in search of 'freak' waves.

=== Documentary ===
Visser is currently working on an adventure documentary which involves new technology and display of human strength and endurance.

=== Others ===
- Diaries with Mark Visser are very short segments that follow Visser around the world in search of some of the best big wave locations. The Diaries run on Fuel TV.
- "Ocean Warrior Course" is a training program created by Visser to help surfers discover the secrets of the elite underwater athletes. The course originates from Visser's own past struggling in big waves. The course teaches about breath holding and safety in the water to students including Navy SEAL and big wave surfers. Over the past 5 years, he has coached some of the most elite military organizations, Olympic and professional sporting teams in the world.
- Book: "The Big Wave Method -Eight Steps to Overcoming Your Fear and Achieving Your Ultimate Dream". Mark Visser. 31 October 2017. Hay House. ISBN 9781401953201.

== Recognition ==
Visser is known as the 2014/15 Big Wave Paddle-in Champion and three times runner up for the ASL Big Wave Awards. Visser dedicates significant time to locating some of the largest waves in the world, employing innovative technology to identify and access them. He has pioneered distinctive approaches to surfing these waves. His achievements extend beyond surfing to encompass elements of adventure, exploration, and survival.
