= Big wave surfing =

Surfing waves at least 20 ft high

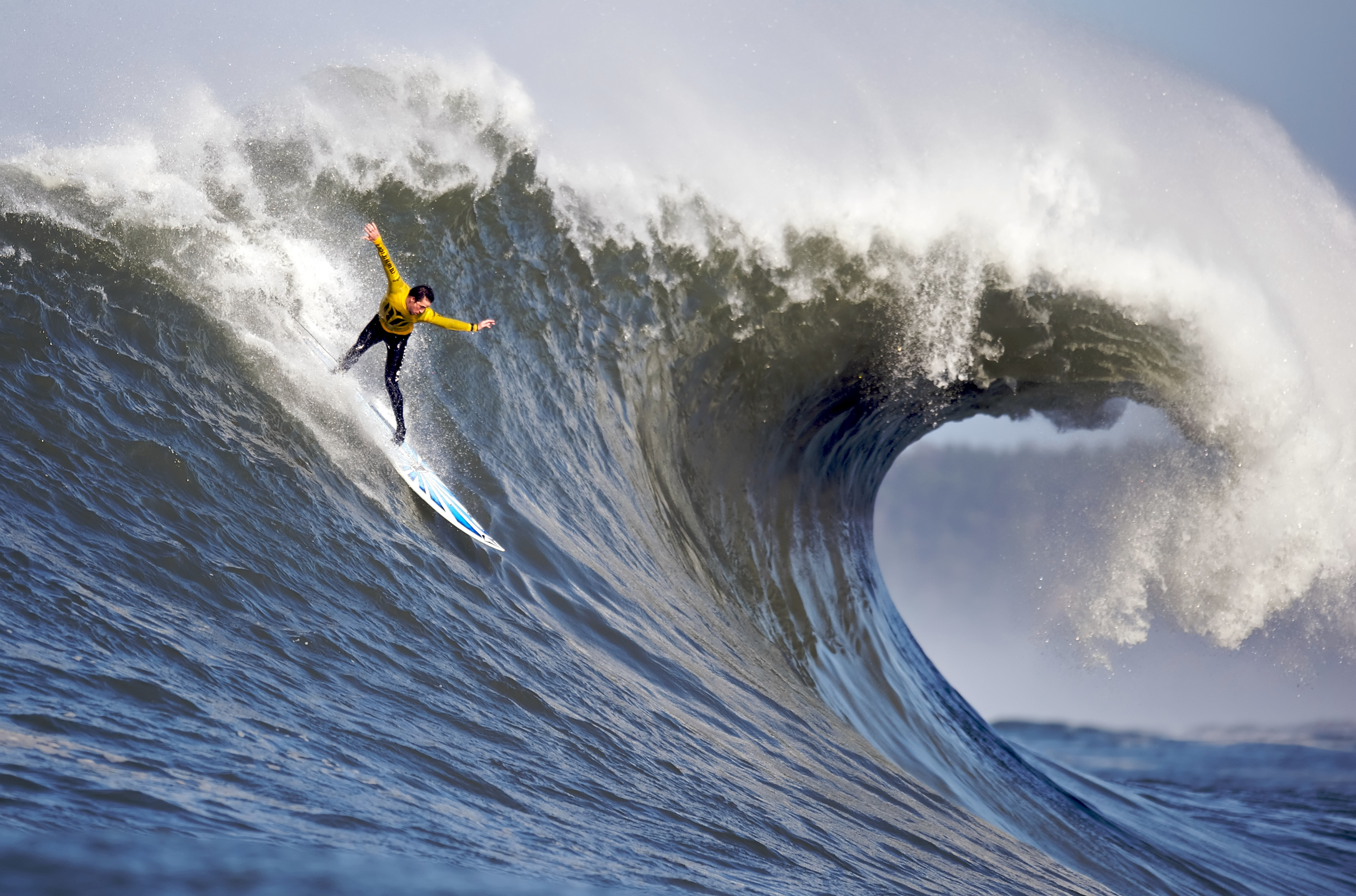
A surfer at Mavericks, one of the world's premier big wave surfing locations

Big wave surfing is a discipline within surfing in which surfers paddle into, or are towed into, waves that are at least 20 feet (6.2 m) high, on surf boards known as "guns" or towboards. The size of the board needed to successfully surf these waves varies by the size of the wave, as well as the technique the surfer uses to reach it. A larger, longer board enables a rider to paddle fast enough to catch the wave and has the advantage of being more stable, but it also limits maneuverability and surfing speed.

In 1992, big wave surfers such as Buzzy Kerbox, Laird Hamilton and Darrick Doerner introduced a cross-over variation called tow-in surfing. While many riders still participate in both activities, they remain very distinct. Tow-in surfing involves being towed in to big waves by jet ski, creating the speed needed to successfully ride them. Tow-in surfing also revolutionized board size, allowing surfers to trade in their unwieldy 12 ft. boards in favor of light, 7 ft boards that enabled more speed and easier maneuverability in waves over 30 ft (10 m). By the end of the 1990s, tow-in surfing meant that surfers could ride waves exceeding 50 ft (15 m).

== Hazards of big wave surfing ==
In a big wave wipeout, a breaking wave can push surfers down 20 to 50 feet (6.2 m to 15.5 m) below the surface. Once they stop spinning around, they have to quickly regain their equilibrium and figure out which way is up. Surfers may have less than 20 seconds to get to the surface before the next wave hits them. Additionally, the water pressure at a depth of 20 to 50 feet can be strong enough to rupture human eardrums. Strong currents and water action at those depths can also slam a surfer into a reef or the ocean floor, which can result in severe injuries or even death.

One of the greatest dangers is the risk of being held underwater by two or more consecutive waves. Surviving a triple hold-down is extremely difficult, and surfers must be prepared to cope with these situations.

A major theme of disagreement among big-wave surfers is whether to attach a leash to the surfboard. In many instances, a leash can do more harm than good to a surfer, catching and holding them underwater and diminishing their opportunities to fight towards the surface. Other surfers, however, depend on the leash. Today, tow-in surfboards are equipped with foot holds (like those found on windsurfs) instead of leashes, in order to provide some security to the surfer without generating safety hazards whilst the surfer is underwater.

These hazards have killed several big-wave surfers. Some of the most notable are Mark Foo, who died surfing Mavericks on 23 December 1994; Donnie Solomon, who died exactly a year later at Waimea Bay; Todd Chesser, who died at Alligator Rock on the North Shore of Oahu on 14 February 1997; Peter Davi, who died at Ghost Trees on 4 December 2007; Sion Milosky, who died surfing Mavericks on 16 March 2011; and Kirk Passmore, who died at Alligator Rock on 12 November 2013.

== Paddle-in surfing ==
On 18 January 2010 Danilo Couto and Marcio Freire became the first to surf Jaws Peahi paddling, surfing the wave to the left side. They did not have jetski support and used only their shorts and their surfboards. They were the only ones to surf Jaws paddling until 4 January 2012, when it was surfed to the right side for the first time.

On 4 January 2012, Greg Long, Ian Walsh, Kohl Christensen, Jeff Rowley, Dave Wassel, Shane Dorian, Mark Healey, Carlos Burle, Nate Fletcher, Garrett McNamara, Kai Barger, North Shore locals and other of the best big-wave surfers in the world invaded the Hawaiian Islands for a historic day of surfing. Surfers had to catch and survive the wave at Jaws Peahi, on the north shore of Maui, without the use of a jet ski.

Jeff Rowley made Australian history by being the first Australian to paddle into a 50-foot plus (15 m) wave at Jaws Peahi, Hawaii, achieving his 'Charge for Charity' mission set for 2011, to raise money for Breast Cancer Australia.

On 30–31 January 2012, Jeff Rowley and a number of international big wave surfers including Greg Long, Shaun Walsh and Albee Layer spent two days paddle-surfing Jaws, on the Hawaiian island of Maui, as part of their ongoing big-wave paddle-in program at the deep-water reef, further cementing the new frontier of paddle-in surfing at Jaws.

On 12 March 2012, Jeff Rowley paddled into Mavericks Left, California, and became the first Australian to accomplish this task. Mavericks is traditionally known as a right-hander wave and Rowley pushed the boundaries of what was possible at the Mavericks left-hander, a task that wasn't without its challenges, requiring a vertical drop into the wave.

On 30 March 2012, Jeff Rowley was a finalist in the Billabong XXL Big Wave Awards 2011/2012, in the Ride of the Year category with his rides at Jaws Peahi in Maui, Hawaii on 30 January 2012, placing 4th place in the world of elite big wave surfers.

== Big wave surfing world records ==
=== Male ===
German surfer Sebastian Steudtner broke the record in October 2020 off the coast of Praia do Norte, Nazaré, Portugal, when he surfed through an 86-foot (26.2 m) wave.

=== Female ===
According to Guinness World Records, Brazilian Maya Gabeira holds the women's big wave record, surfing a 22.4-metre (73.5 ft) wave in Portugal in February 2020. However, it has been claimed that Justine Dupont rode a 75-foot (22.9 m) wave, although this claim has not been ratified by Guinness.

== Big Wave Surfing Contest ==
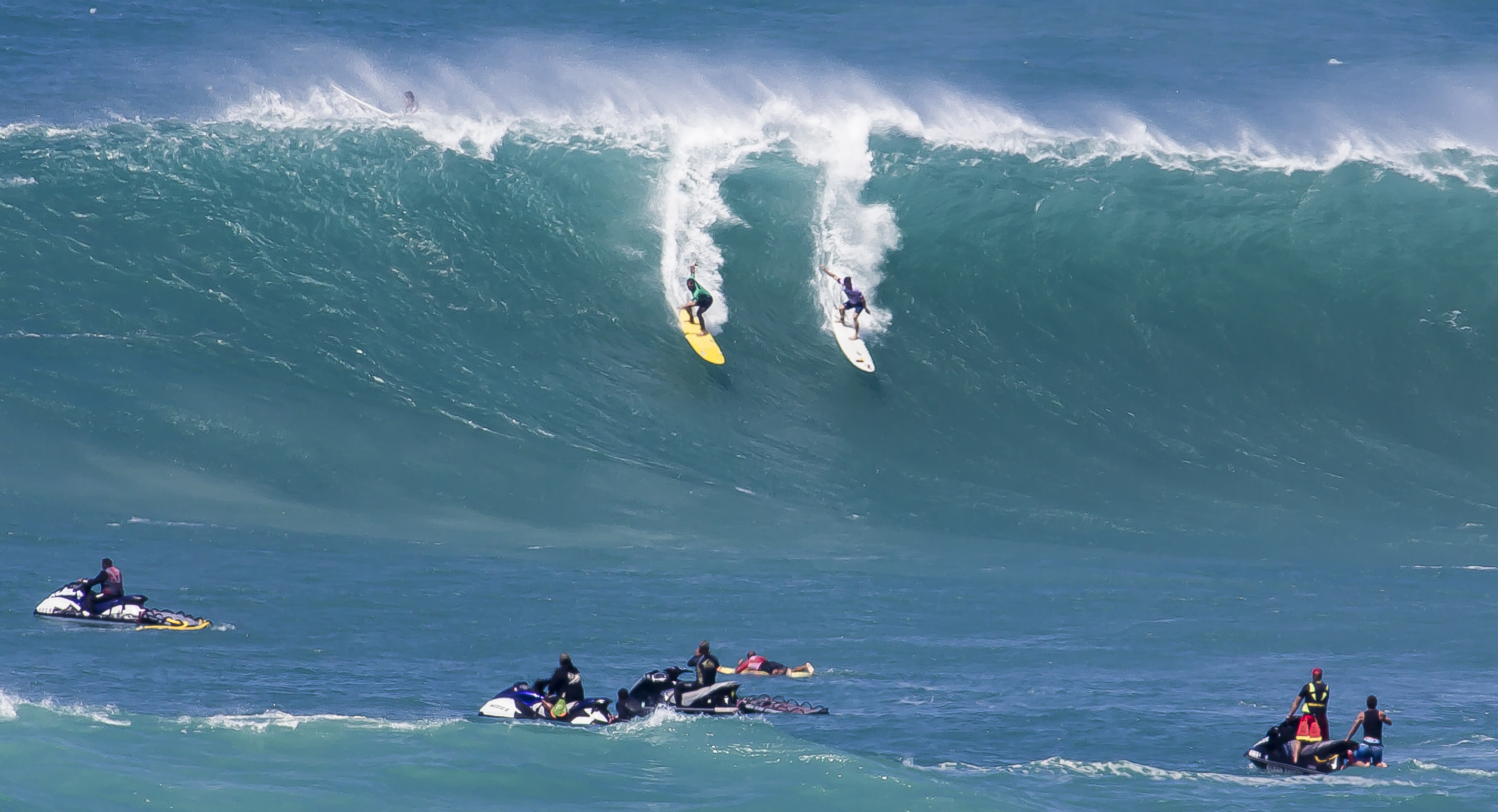
Surfing at The Eddie on 25 February 2016

The oldest and most prestigious big wave contest is The Eddie, named after Oahu north shore Hawai'ian lifeguard and surfer Eddie Aikau. The competition window is between 1 December and the last day of February annually.

Another big wave surfing contest hosted by Red Bull is held at Jaws Peahi, with invitation of 21 of the best big wave surfers in the world. The waiting period for the contest lasts from December 7th to the 15th of March. Some of the known invitees to the contest include Jeff Rowley, Albee Layer, Greg Long, Shane Dorian, Kai Lenny, and Ian Walsh.

From 1999 to 2016, Mavericks was a premier big wave contest. The first year's results were first place, Darryl Virostko ("Flea"); second place, Richard Schmidt (surfer); third place, Ross Clarke-Jones; and fourth place, Peter Mel. This contest was last held in 2016, and has been indefinitely cancelled by the World Surf League.

Beginning in 2014–15, the World Surf League (WSL) has sanctioned the Big Wave World Tour (BWWT). On 28 February 2015, Makua Rothman became the first WSL BWWT Champion with 20,833 points outscoring the runner-up, Gabriel Villaran of Peru, by almost 7,000 points.

On 11 November 2016, Paige Alms of Maui was crowned the first women's big wave surfing champion at Jaws on Maui during the Pe'ahi Women's Challenge which was part of the Women's Big Wave Tour #1 held 15 Oct – 11 November 2016, at Haiku, Hawaii. This was the first big wave surfing contest ever held for women. The results were in first place Paige Alms (Hawaii), second place Justine Dupont (France), third place Felicity Palmateer (Australia), and tied for fourth place Keala Kennelly (Hawaii), Emily Erickson (Hawaii), and Laura Enever (Australia).

== Big Wave Surfing Awards ==
Since 2005, the world's best big wave surfers gather in "Surf City" Huntington Beach, California, for the annual World Surf League (WSL) Big Wave Awards hosted by surfer Strider Wastlewski. The gala ceremony is currently held at the Pasea Hotel and Spa and nominated surfers are awarded for their greatest rides of the past year and the big wave community is celebrated.

The event raises the bar every year, with $350,000 in prize money allotted across seven categories:

- "XXL Biggest Wave"
- "Biggest Paddle Wave"
- "Tube of the Year"
- "Best Overall Performance"
- "Women's Performance"
- "Wipeout Award"
- "Ride of the Year".

The seven winners are given top honors and a TAG Heuer watch for another WSL big wave season.

== WSL Big Wave Championship Tour champions ==
WSL Big Wave Championship Tour champions

Year	WSL Men's Big Wave Tour		WSL Women's Big Wave Tour	
Year	Name	Points	Name	Points
2021	Lucas "Chumbo" Chianca (BRA)			
2018	Grant Baker (ZAF)	16, 305	Keala Kennelly (HAW)	12,100
2017	Billy Kemper (HAW)	27,140	Paige Alms (HAW)	10,000
2016	Grant Baker (ZAF)	25,018	Paige Alms (HAW)	12,500
2015	Greg Long (USA)	21,266		
2014	Makuakai Rothman (HAW)	20,833		
2013	Grant Baker (ZAF)	2,459		
2012	Greg Long (USA)	2,155		
2011	Peter Mel (USA)	1,472		
2010	Jamie Sterling (HAW)	2,509		
2009	Carlos Burle (BRA)	2,443		

== Notable big wave surfing spots ==
=== Australia ===
- No Toes, New South Wales, Australia
- Dangerous Banks, Tasmania, Australia
- Pedra Branca, Tasmania, Australia
- Shipstern Bluff, Tasmania, Australia
- Cow Bombie, Western Australia, Australia
- Cyclops, Western Australia, Australia
- Tombstones, Western Australia, Australia
- The Right, Western Australia, Australia

=== United States (Mainland) ===
- Cortes Bank, California, United States
- Ghost Trees, Monterrey, California, United States
- Mavericks, Half Moon Bay, California, United States
- The Wedge, Newport Beach, California, United States
- Nelscott Reef, Lincoln City, Oregon, United States

=== Oceania ===
- Cloudbreak, Fiji
- Teahupoo, Tahiti, France
- Papatowai, The Catlins, New Zealand
- Jaws/Peahi, Hawaii, United States
- Pipeline, Hawaii, United States
- Sunset Beach, Hawaii, United States
- Waimea Bay, Hawaii, United States

=== Europe ===
- Cribbar, Newquay, Cornwall, United Kingdom
- Aileens, Cliffs of Moher, County Clare, Ireland
- Mullaghmore, Ireland
- Madeira, Portugal
- Nazaré, Portugal
- Punta Galea between Getxo and Sopela, Basque Country, Spain
- Aizpurupe near Zarautz, Gipuzkoa, Basque Country, Spain
- Belharra, Basque Country, France

=== Latin America ===
- Praia da Vila, Santa Catarina, Brazil
- Praia do Cardoso, Santa Catarina, Brazil
- El Buey, Arica, Chile
- Punta de Lobos, Pichilemu, Cardenal Caro, O’Higgins, Chile
- Puerto Escondido, Mexico
- Todos Santos Island, Baja, Mexico
- Pico Alto, Punta Hermosa, Lima, Peru

=== Caribbean ===
- Tres Palmas, Puerto Rico

=== Africa ===
- Dungeons, Cape Town, South Africa

== Notable big wave surfers ==
- Koby Abberton, Australia
- Eddie Aikau, Hawaii
- Paige Alms, Hawaii
- Grant "Twiggy" Baker, South Africa
- Chris Bertish, South Africa
- Ken Bradshaw, Hawaii
- Carlos Burle, Brazil
- Tom Carroll, Australia
- Lucas "Chumbo" Chianca, Brazil
- Jeff Clark, USA
- Ross Clarke-Jones, Australia
- Andrew Cotton, United Kingdom
- Shane Dorian, Hawaii
- Justine Dupont, France
- John John Florence, Hawaii
- Jérémy Florès, France
- Mark Foo, Singapore
- Maya Gabeira, Brazil
- Laird Hamilton, Hawaii
- Malik Joyeux, Tahiti, France
- Dave Kalama, Hawaii
- Keala Kennelly, Hawaii
- Taylor Knox, California, USA
- Rodrigo Koxa, Brazil
- Nic Lamb, California, United States of America
- Kai Lenny, Hawaii
- Greg Long, California, USA
- Conor Maguire, Ireland
- Mark Mathews, Australia
- Garrett McNamara, Hawaii
- Peter Mel, California, USA
- Andrea Moller, Brazil
- Jay Moriarity California, USA
- Greg Noll, California, USA
- Jamie O'Brien, Hawaii
- Felicity Palmateer, Australia
- Mike Parsons, California, USA
- Bob Pike, Australia
- Makua Rothman, Hawaii
- Jeff Rowley, Australia
- Will Skudin, New York, USA
- Sebastian Steudtner, Germany
- Buzzy Trent, Hawaii
- Bianca Valenti, California, USA
- Mark Visser, Australia

== Big wave surfing movies ==
- Surf's Up 2: WaveMania (2017 sequel, fiction)
- Distance between Dreams (2016)
- Point Break (2015 remake, fiction)
- View from a Blue Moon (2015)
- Mad Dogs: The Conquest of Jaws (2015)
- Hawaiian: The Legend of Eddie Aikau (2013)
- Storm Surfers 3D (2012)
- Chasing Mavericks (2012, biographical drama film)
- Fighting Fear (2011)
- Waveriders (2008)
- Pipeline (2007)
- Surf's Up (2007, fiction)
- Billabong Odyssey (2005)
- Riding Giants (2004)
- Step Into Liquid (2003)
- Die Another Day (2002, fiction)
- Strapped (2002)
- Laird (2002)
- In God's Hands (1998, fiction)
- Point Break (1991, fiction)
- Big Wednesday (1978)
- Ride the Wild Surf (1964, fiction)
- Surfing Hollow Days (1961)

== See also ==
- Diving hazards and precautions
- "Eddie Would Go"
