= Rusty Long =

American professional surfer

Rusty Long is an explorer, journalist, professional big wave surfer, and photographer. At an early age, he and his brother Greg Long were junior lifeguards as well as surfers in their hometown of San Clemente, California. This led to Rusty's quest for big waves; he has earned the reputation as being one of the most prominent big wave surfers in the world. To add to his big wave accomplishments Rusty has also surfed China's Qiantang River Tidal Bore known as the "Silver Dragon" along with his brother Greg and Mark Healey in September 2008.

In 2015, Long's coffee table book, The Finest Line, about big wave surfing, was published.
