= Ghost Trees =

Surfing location in Northern California, United States

Ghost Tree
- Surf break
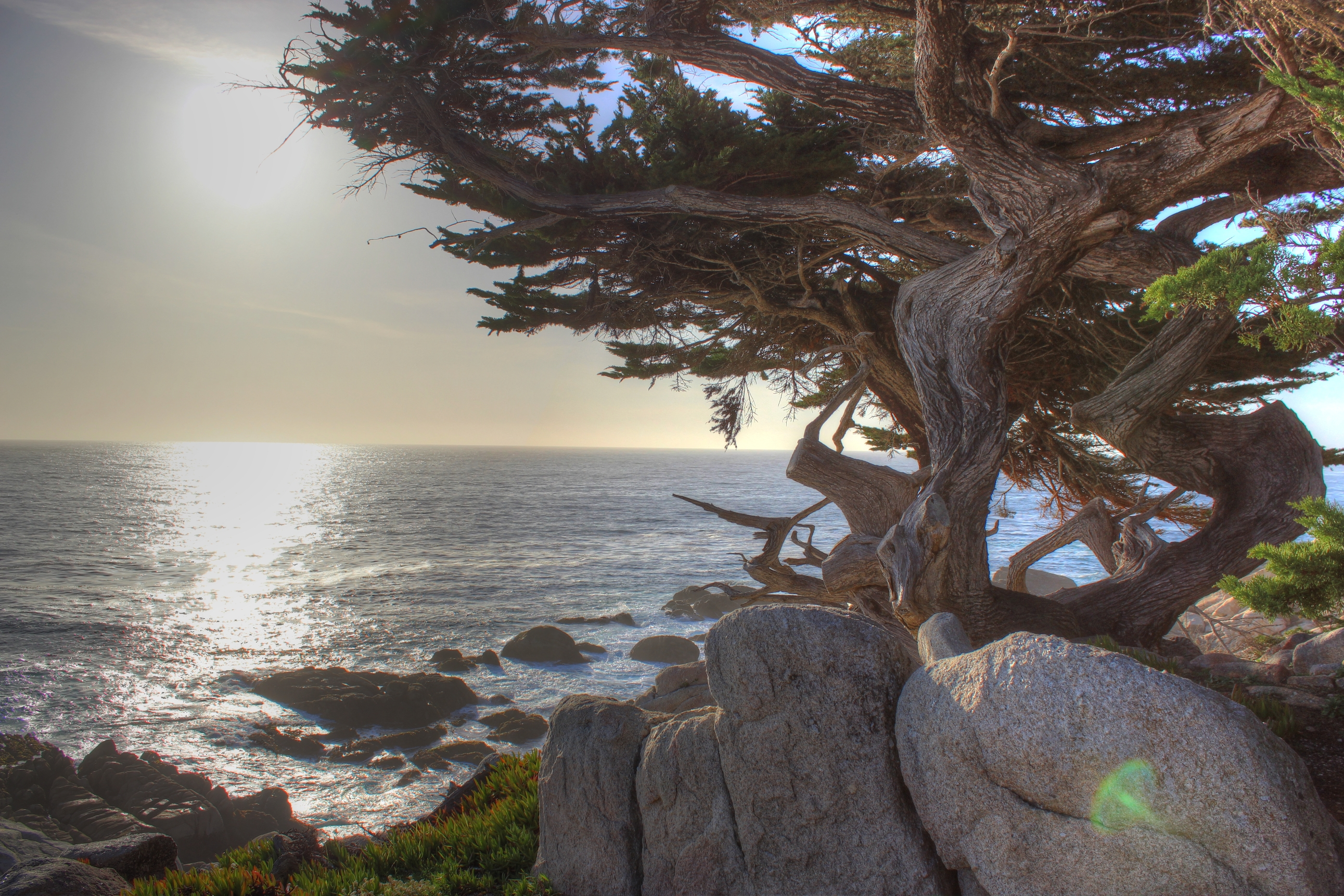
- Pebble Beach, Del Monte Forest
- Interactive map of Ghost Tree
- Coordinates: 36°33′39″N 121°57′06″W
- Location: Pebble Beach, California

Ghost Tree is a famed big wave surfing location off the 18th hole of Pebble Beach Golf Links in Pebble Beach, California. The wave breaks off the rock-strewn shoreline known as Pescadero Point. On rare winter days with the proper westerly angle, waves are focused by the deep Carmel Canyon to rear up as much as 60 ft (18 m) in height. Formerly known as Pesky's, Ghost Tree is considered one of the most dangerous waves in the world due to its slab shape, massive boils, strong current, bull kelp, and the underwater labyrinth of natural rock pillars in the impact zone. It is also frequented by white sharks.

== Background ==
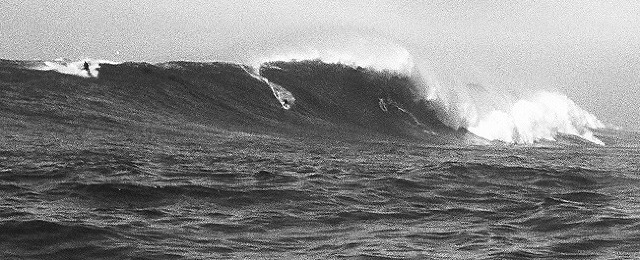
Don Curry at Ghost Trees

Ghost Trees gets its name from the white and gnarly Monterey Cypress trees in the area, which call to mind ghosts.

One of the earliest known surfers of Ghost Trees was Fred Van Dyke, who bodysurfed the wave alone in the early 1960s. In the ensuing decades, a number of locals and visitors to the area paddled out and successfully surfed Ghost Trees, but the consensus was that the wave heaved in too fast and broke too close to the rocks.

In the 2000s, Ghost Trees enjoyed international big wave notoriety as surf professionals and locals accessed the wave by towing into it behind jet skis. During this era of tow-surfing, Carmel surfer Don Curry named the wave Ghost Trees after the bleached trunks of dead cypress at the end of 17-Mile Drive, which passed Pescadero Point.

Exposure in the form of surf industry advertisements and magazines created conflict between the professional surfers flocking to Ghost Trees on the rare days that conditions allowed it to be surfed and locals who wanted to keep the region's waves secret to minimize crowds.

Peter Davi, one of the area's most beloved watermen, died at Ghost Trees on December 4, 2007. He was found floating in the water unconscious by fellow surfers.

Starting in mid-March 2009, motorized personal watercraft, or JetSkis, were banned at Ghost Tree due to the fact that the wave fell within the boundaries of the Monterey Bay National Marine Sanctuary.

== Bibliography ==
- Dixon, Chris (March 19, 2014). "Beneath the Waves". Men's Journal.
- Masters, Ryan (2005). "Rare Birds: Ghost Tree". The Surfer's Journal. Vol. 14, no. 1.
