= Lucas Chumbo =

Brazilian surfer

Lucas "Chumbo" Chianca
- Chumbo in 2026

Personal information
- Nickname: Chumbo
- Born: Lucas Yan Cabral Azeredo Chianca; 25 August 1995 (age 31) Saquarema, Brazil
- Height: 6 ft 3 in (1.89 m)
- Weight: 192 Ib (87 kg)
- Website: https://www.lucaschumbo.com/

Surfing career
- Sport: Surfing
- Best year: 2018
- Sponsors: Red Bull Mormaii
- Major achievements: 2017 Nazaré Challenge WSL Big Wave Tour; Punta Galea Challenge; 2018 Mormaii Big Wave Challenge; 2018 Puerto Escondido Cup

Surfing specifications
- Stance: Goofy

Lucas Yan Cabral Azeredo Chianca (born 25 August 1995) better known as Lucas Chumbo, is a Brazilian professional surfer. He is the older brother of WSL Championship Tour surfer Joao Chianca.

== Career ==
In February 2018 he won the Nazare Challenge in the Men's Big Wave category with the better score of the championship's history. In the same year, he received the 2018 Biliabong XXL in the category of best male performance.

In January 2020 he participated in the reality show Big Brother Brasil 20, as a celebrity, being the first evicted of the program (20th place) with 75,54% of votes against Bianca Andrade (24,46%).

In February 2020 he and Kai Lenny won the Nazaré Tow Surfing Challenge as partners in the Men's Big Wave category, at Praia do Norte (Nazaré), in Portugal.

== Filmography ==
Year	Title	Production	Role	Notes
2019	Se Prepara	Red Bull TV	Himself	
2020	Big Brother Brasil 20	Rede Globo	Contestant (Himself)	20th Place
2020	Burle, train me!	Rede Globo - Canal OFF	Himself	1st Season

== Awards and nominations ==
Year	Prêmio	Category	Result	References
2018	Surfer Awards	Heavy Water	Won	
2018	Billabong XXL	Best Male Performance	Won	
