= Nelscott Reef =

Coordinates: 44.949917°N 124.027963°W

Nelscott Reef is an ocean reef near Lincoln City, Oregon, United States, that creates a reef break (a surf-break created by the presence of a rock or coral reef) that is known as the only place on the Oregon Coast with the right conditions for big wave surfing. It is named for the former community of Nelscott, which is now a part of Lincoln City. It is the venue of the Nelscott Reef Big Wave Classic held annually by local surfer John Forse, who founded the event in 2005.
