= Buzzy Kerbox =

American surfer, photographer and model

- Born: Burton Kerbox; 1956 (age 69–70); Indianapolis, Indiana, U.S.
- Occupations: Surfer, photographer, model
- Spouses: Kirstin Kerbox; Barbara Kraft
- Children: 3

Burton "Buzzy" Kerbox (born 1956) is an American surfer, photographer and model. He is best known for co-developing tow-in surfing with Laird Hamilton, Dave Kalama, and a handful of other surfers in the mid-1990s.

== Early life ==
Kerbox was born in 1956 in Indianapolis, Indiana. His family moved to Kailua, in eastern Oahu, in 1965.

== Surfing renown ==
Shortly after having moved to Hawaii, in 1966, Kerbox began surfing. He was ranked in the top ten in 1977, 1978 and 1980. He won the 1978 World Cup at Sunset Beach and the 1980 Surfabout in Sydney. His development of tow-in surfing, along with fellow surfers such as Dave Kalama and Laird Hamilton, paved the way for surfers worldwide to catch waves which were previously thought to be out of reach, either because they were far from natural breaks like beaches and coasts or because they were too big. The first few tow-in sessions were done using Kerbox's 15-foot Zodiac motorboat. In more recent years, Kerbox has been an advocate for standup paddle boarding, also known as SUP.

== Tow-in surfing ==
Surfers are towed into a breaking wave via a PWC (personal watercraft, such as a Jet Ski) or a Zodiac-type boat. The surfer holds a tow rope attached to the watercraft and then are towed into place on the wave while standing on their surfboard (which has foot straps, unlike regular boards) to match the speed of the wave, at which point they drop the tow rope and surf the wave. Prior to the development of the tow-in method, surfers were generally unable to catch waves topping more than 30 feet or so due to the speed of those giant waves, and not being able to paddle as fast as the wave with some exceptions. With the advent of the tow-in method, surfers were able to catch waves two and three times that height. Driver and surfer typically trade roles during a surfing session. Tow-in is thought to have revolutionized big wave surfing. Kerbox and other professional surfers were featured in Susan Casey's 2011 non-fiction volume The Wave.

== Modeling career ==
In 1977, famed photographer Bruce Weber saw a photograph of Kerbox in a surfing magazine and persuaded him to come to New York City to try his hand at modeling. Kerbox subsequently modeled in major national advertising campaigns for Levi's, Ralph Lauren, Reyn Spooner, and United Airlines.

== Movie career ==
In the 1980s Kerbox starred in multiple movies by producer Andy Sidaris including the award-winning Hard Hunted in which he plays Cole, a secret agent who surfs the north shore in between drug busts.

== Personal life ==
Kerbox has three sons with his ex-wife Kirstin Kerbox. He is married to Barbara Kraft.
