= Jeff Rowley =

Australian surfer (born 1979)

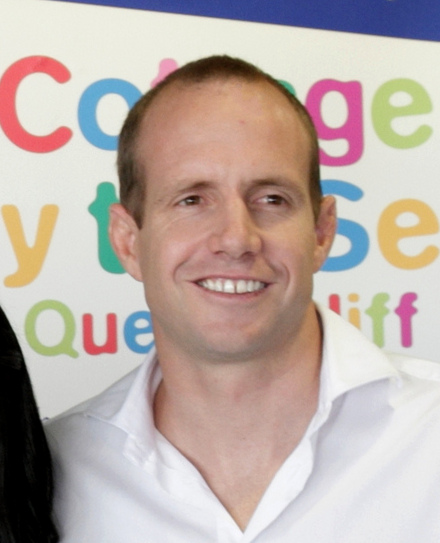
- Rowley in 2012
- Born: 6 April 1979 (age 47); Geelong, Victoria, Australia
- Occupation: Professional big wave surfer
- Height: 6 ft 1 in (185 cm)
- Website: jeffrowley.com

Jeff Rowley (born 6 April 1979) is a professional big wave surfer from Torquay, Victoria, Australia. He grew up at Bells Beach, a popular surf location in regional Victoria.

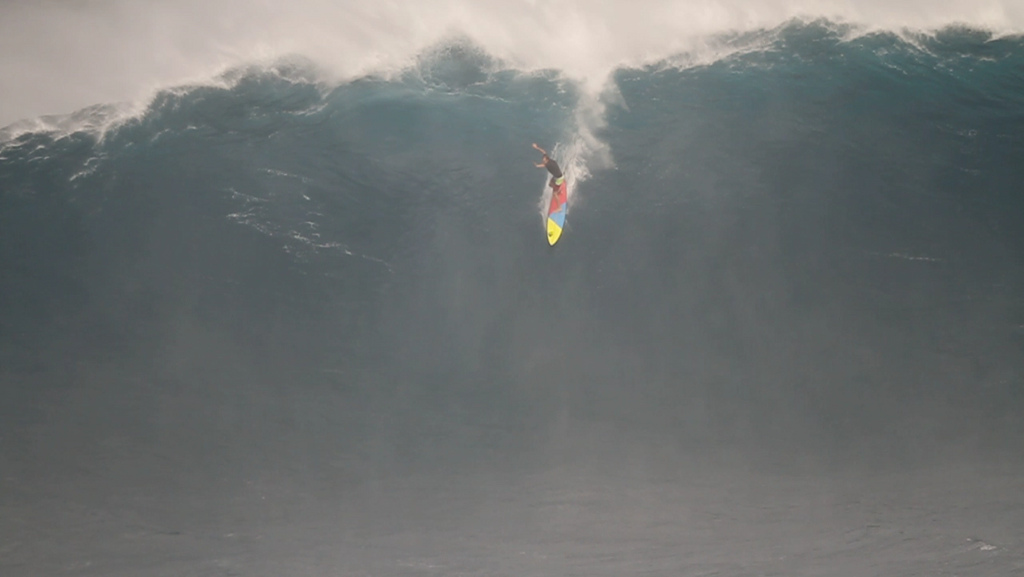
Jeff Rowley surfs the "Jaws" break at Peahi, Hawaii

== Accomplishments ==
On 4 January 2012, he became the first Australian to paddle into a 15 metre high wave at Jaws Peahi, Hawaii, for many years known as the biggest and most dangerous surf break in the world. Using an inflatable wetsuit he rode the wave with a 3-metre Channel Islands surfboard, which he later said was not large enough. His effort placed him as 4th in the world at the 2012 Billabong XXL Big Wave Awards.

He was a finalist in 2012's Australian Surfing Life's Oakley Big Wave Awards, having surfed 'albatross' near Bells Beach, a break he described as "like coming down a five-storey building that's moving at about 80 kilometres an hour."

Described as "fearless", Rowley is also known for surfing at the 2021 Fifty Year Storm invitational at Bells Beach, Victoria and "the swell of the decade" at Cloudbreak, Fiji along with the high-risk, and very shallow break at Teahupo'o, Tahiti.

== Later career ==
In 2012, Tourism Australia appointed him as a "friend of Australia' alongside Baz Luhrmann and The Wiggles to promote the country as a destination.

Rowley has earned a Master of Business Administration from Deakin University and also works as a motivational speaker.
