= Billabong XXL =

Surf Award

The Billabong XXL is a global big wave award. This event gathers big wave surfers from all around the world in a one contest. Every year, surfers ride big waves for prizes, for example; Pacifico Paddle, Biggest Wave, Pacifico Tube, Performance Champion (women's and men's), Ride of the Year.
