= Peʻahi, Hawaii =

Big Wave Surf beach in Hawaii

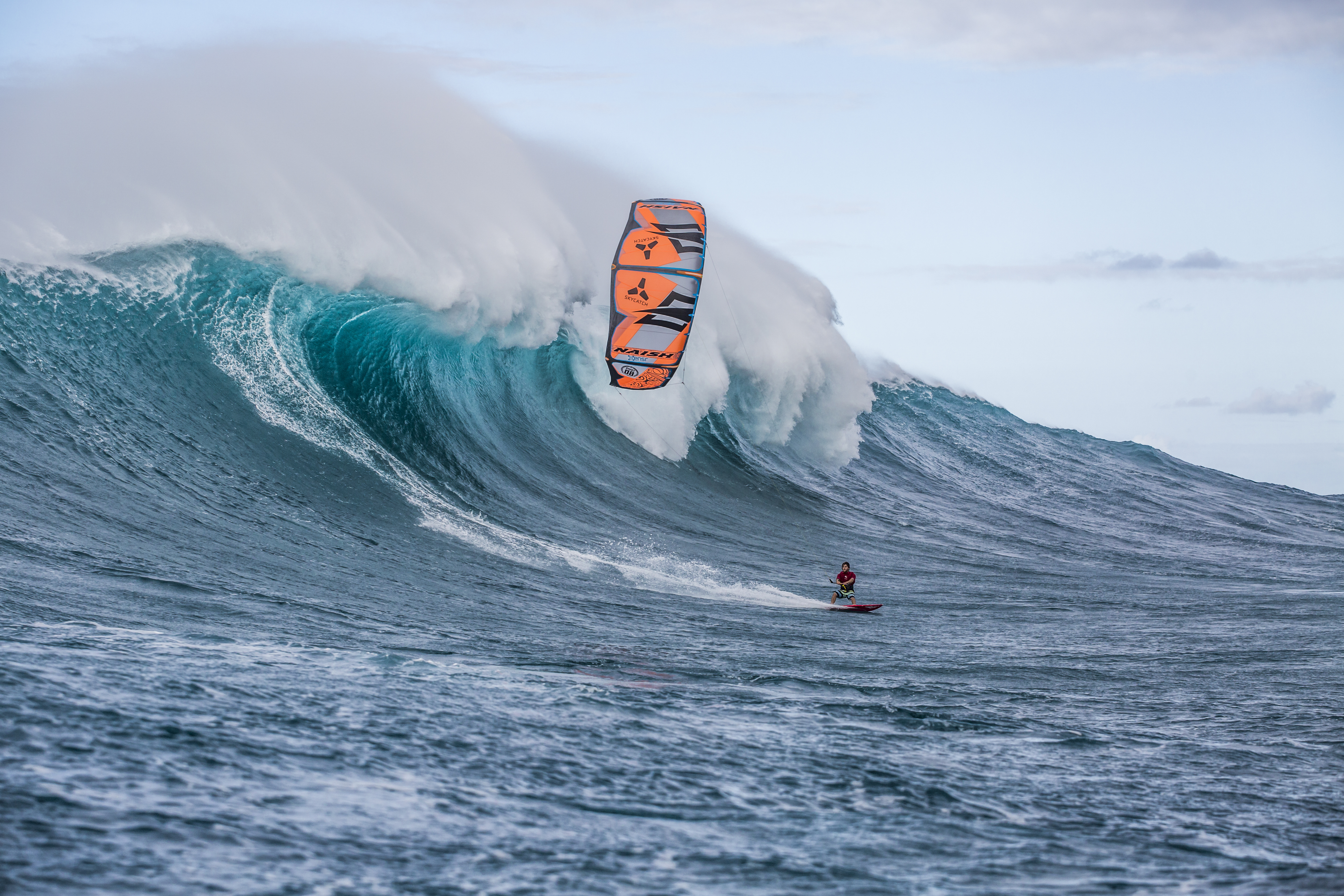
Jesse Richman riding a wave at Peʻahi, Maui

Peʻahi (/peɪˈɑːhiː/ pay-AH-hee; Hawaiian: [peˈʔɐhi]) is a place on the north shore of the island of Maui in the U.S. state of Hawaii. It has lent its name to a big wave surfing break, also known as Jaws.

== Location ==
Pe'ahi (Jaws) surf break is roughly three miles east of Pāʻia and makai (ocean side) of the Hana Highway (Route 36) located a few hundred feet from the north shore cliffs at 20°56′36″N 156°17′52″W.

Best viewing, when the wave is breaking, is from the Pe'ahi Overlook, located at the end of Hahana Road, a mostly unpaved road leading north from the highway between mile markers 13 and 14. Access can be difficult, especially when wet, with 4-wheel drive vehicles only recommended if driving. Otherwise it is about a 1.5 mile walk.

There are no beaches in the vicinity. Viewing is from the top of 100–150-foot (30–46 m) ocean side cliffs.

== Pe'ahi (Jaws) ==
The name Peʻahi originally applied to an ancient Hawaii land area (ahupuaʻa) at about 20°55′00″N 156°17′00″W. Like many ancient land areas, it extended from the northern slopes of Haleakalā to the sea-level Peʻahi gulch. It also lent its name to a reservoir formed by a dam across the Uaoa Stream.

Peʻahi means "wave" in the Hawaiian language, in the sense of a fanning or beckoning motion of the hand. The name (Peʻahi) for the break is an English-language word-play on the nearby ancient area name, since the Hawaiian people had several other words, such as nalu, for waves of water.

When the Maui surfers John Roberson, John Lemus, and John Potterick were surfing the break in 1975, they noticed a sudden change in the conditions to huge dangerous waves, and gave it a nickname after the film Jaws, comparing the unpredictability to a shark attack.

In the 1980s, a few intrepid wind surfers (Mark Pedersen, Dave Kalama, Brett Lickle) surfed the break from Hoʻokipa. The wave sizes at Jaws (which can exceed 60 feet (18 m) during the months of December to March) attract big wave surfers such as Laird Hamilton and Dave Kalama using the tow-in surfing method of big wave surf riding they co-invented (with Darrick Doerner and Buzzy Kerbox). To avoid a steep climb, rocky beach and fast-moving waves, many surfers are towed by personal water craft launched from nearby areas such as the boat ramp at Māliko Bay.

In 1997 Charles and Leslie Lyon published a book of surfer photographs titled Jaws Maui. An article by Joel Achenbach on Jaws appeared in the November 1998 issue of National Geographic magazine, both photographed by Patrick McFeeley. The extreme size of the waves is caused by the structure of an underwater ridge which has been studied by scientists.

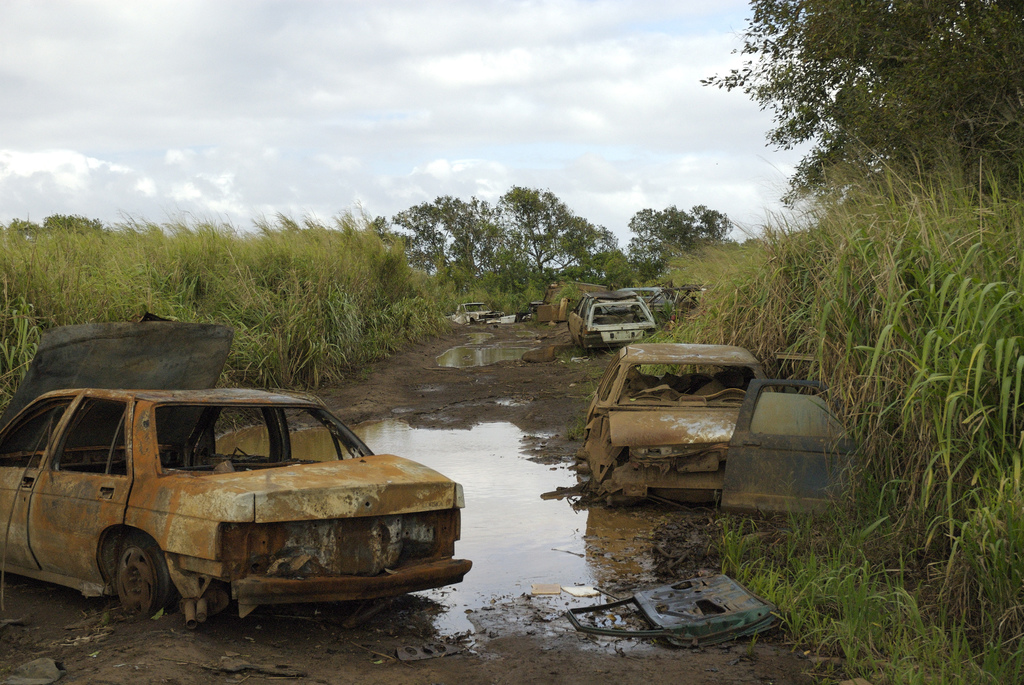
Obstructed road in 2006

Doerner, Kalama, and Hamilton appeared as stunt doubles for James Bond in the opening sequence of the film Die Another Day filmed at Jaws in 2001. National Geographic Adventure magazine had an article in its July 2002 issue. The publicity greatly increased the popularity of the site, resulting in over-crowding by 2004.

The lookouts on the cliffs above the break are the best vantage points for spectators; professional photographers use boats or helicopters. The road was blocked in 2006, but cleared in 2009. There have been several "World Cup of Tow-in Surfing" contests held, but the changing conditions mean the dates cannot be set in advance.

The Billabong XXL awards given to big wave surfers often have several nominees from the Jaws break in the "biggest wave" category. Even experienced surfers can be seriously injured on the violent waves, and the remote location requires expensive rescues via helicopter.

== Paddle-in surfing ==
In 2001 Chris Bertish, a South African big wave surfer, became the first to paddle into giant surf at Pe'ahi (Jaws).

In 2006 Danilo Couto, Marcio Freire, and Yuri Soledade are surfers from Brazil who moved to Hawaii in the late 1990s with the goal of riding the biggest waves in the world. Danilo Couto became known as one of the best big wave riders in the world and was a finalist at the XXL Big Wave Awards ten times. Marcio Freire was a multiple-time state champion in Brazil who surfed Jaws by himself, using only his arm power. Yuri Soledade is a successful businessman and free surfer who chases the biggest waves in the world. They all started surfing Jaws in 2006 without jet ski support, rescue teams, or life jackets. The documentary "Mad Dogs" features testimonials from these surfers and others about their experiences surfing at Jaws.

On 4 January 2012, Greg Long, Ian Walsh, Kohl Christensen, Jeff Rowley, Dave Wassel, Shane Dorian, Mark Healey, Carlos Burle, Nate Fletcher, Eli Goldwyn, Goucho Gordon, Garrett McNamara, Kai Barger, North Shore locals and other of the best big wave surfers in the world invaded the Hawaiian Islands for a historic day of surfing. Big wave surfer and adventure athlete Jeff Rowley made Australian history by being the first Australian to paddle into a 50-foot plus (15 metre) wave at Jaws Peahi, Hawaii, achieving his 'Charge for Charity' mission set for 2011, to raise money for Breast Cancer Australia.

On 14 March 2007 the Brazilian surfers Marcio Freire, Danilo Couto and Yuri Soledade, also known as "Mad Dogs" paddled surfing on a big day at Jaws, showing that it was possible. On 30–31 January 2012, Rowley and a number of international big wave surfers including Greg Long, Shaun Walsh and Albee Layer spent two days paddle-surfing Jaws, on the Hawaiian island of Maui, as part of their ongoing big-wave paddle-in program at the deep-water reef, further cementing the new frontier of paddle-in surfing at Jaws.

On 30 March 2012, Rowley was a finalist in the Billabong XXL Big Wave Awards 2011/2012, in the Ride of the Year category with his rides at Jaws Peahi in Maui, Hawaii on 30 January 2012, placing him 4th place in the world of elite big wave surfers and meriting the respect of the big wave surfing community.

== Red Bull Jaws contest ==
A big wave surfing contest hosted by Red Bull was held at Jaws Peahi, with invitation of 21 of the best big wave surfers in the world. The waiting period for the contest was from 8 December to 15 March 2013. Some of the known invitees to the contest included Jeff Rowley, Albee Layer, Greg Long, Shane Dorian, John John Florence, and Kala Alexander.

== See also ==
- Big wave surfing
