= Belharra =

Surf spot off Saint-Jean-de-Luz, France

Coordinates: 43.4036°N 1.7178°W

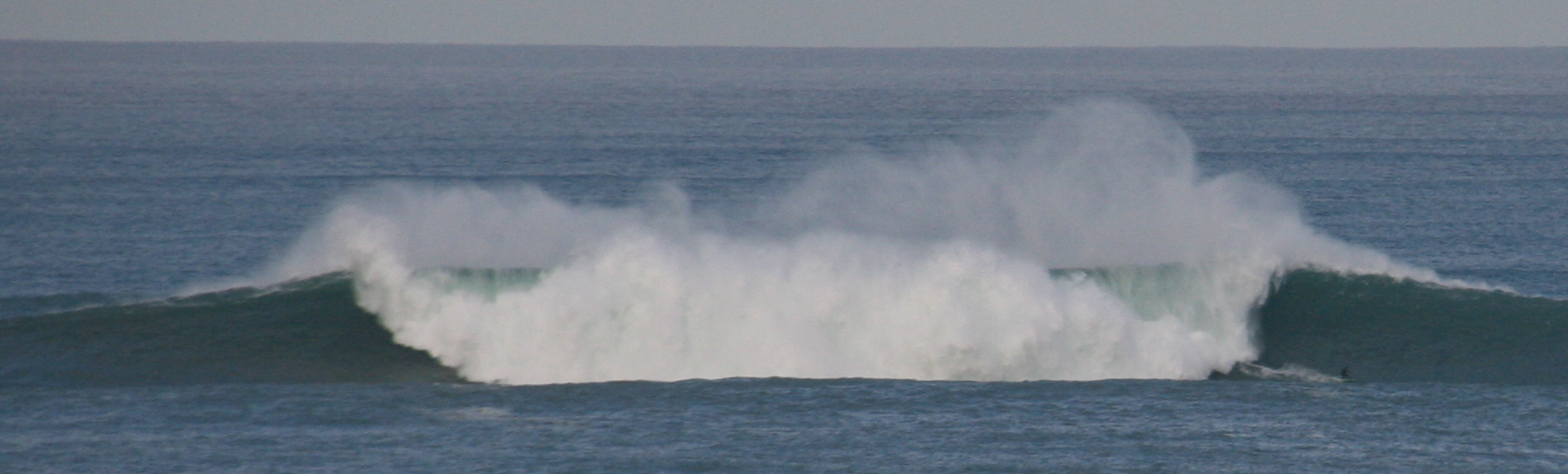
A surfer riding Belharra on 22 December 2013

Belharra, (Basque: Belarra, literally "grass, weed") is a reef and a surf spot in located off Saint-Jean-de-Luz in the Northern Basque Country, in the department of Pyrénées-Atlantiques, France. The shoal creates a violent wave. Before a jetty was constructed in the harbor, the wave sometimes swallowed ships moored at Socoa. The 8 metres (26 ft)-plus wave forms northwest of the bay of Saint-Jean-de-Luz, between Socoa and Hendaye, about 2.5 kilometres (1.6 mi) from the beach. It breaks only rarely, and doesn't break at all most winters. It was first surfed on 22 November 2002. For example, during the winter of 2013–2014, Belharra broke only three times: 28 October 2013, 22 December 2013 and 7 January 2014. The shoal, which sits between 14 and 18 metres (46 and 59 ft) deep, consists of a plateau forming a stepped overhang. When there is no swell, the area can be used as a dive site.
