= Tow-in surfing =

Surfing technique

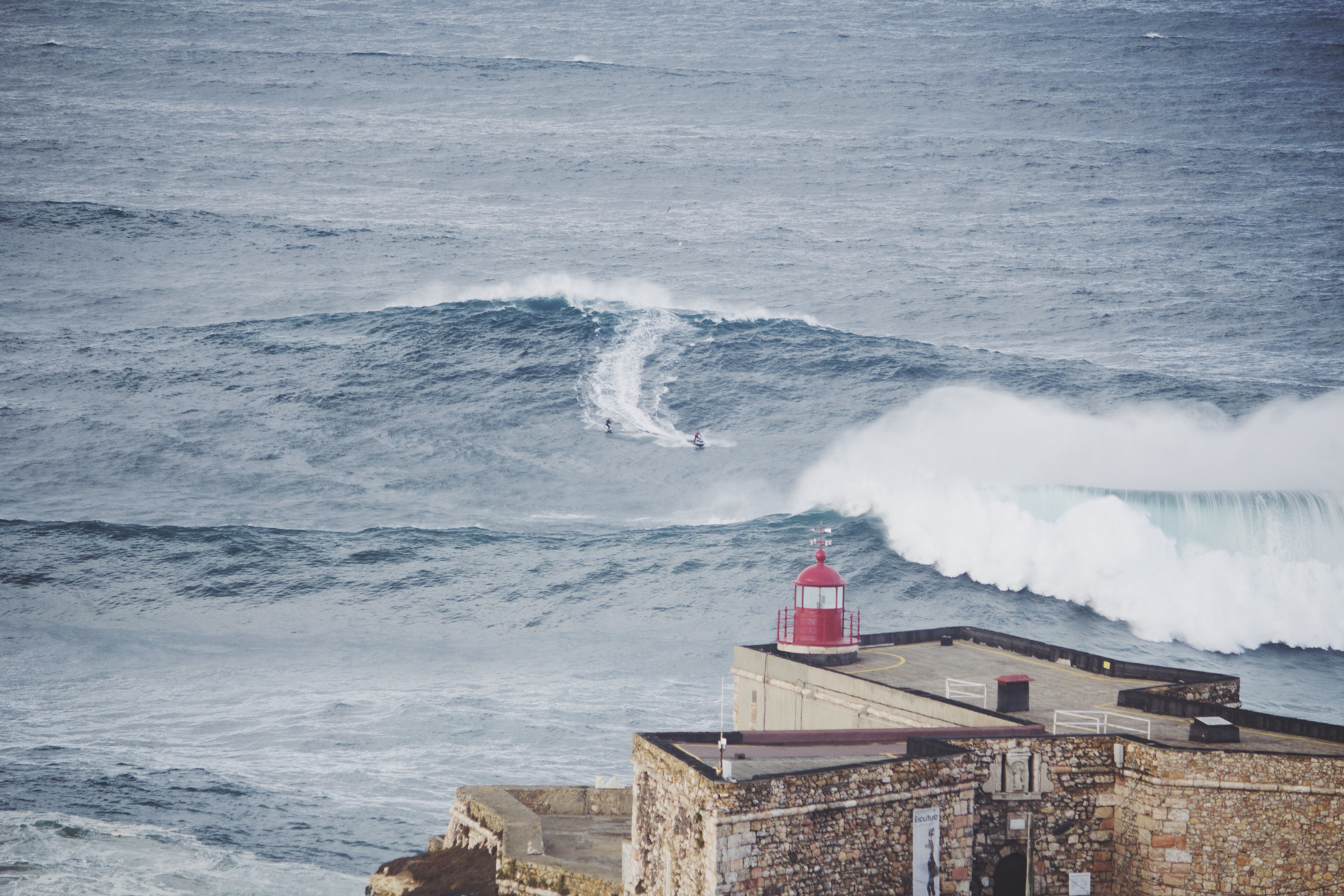
Surfer is pulled by watercraft.

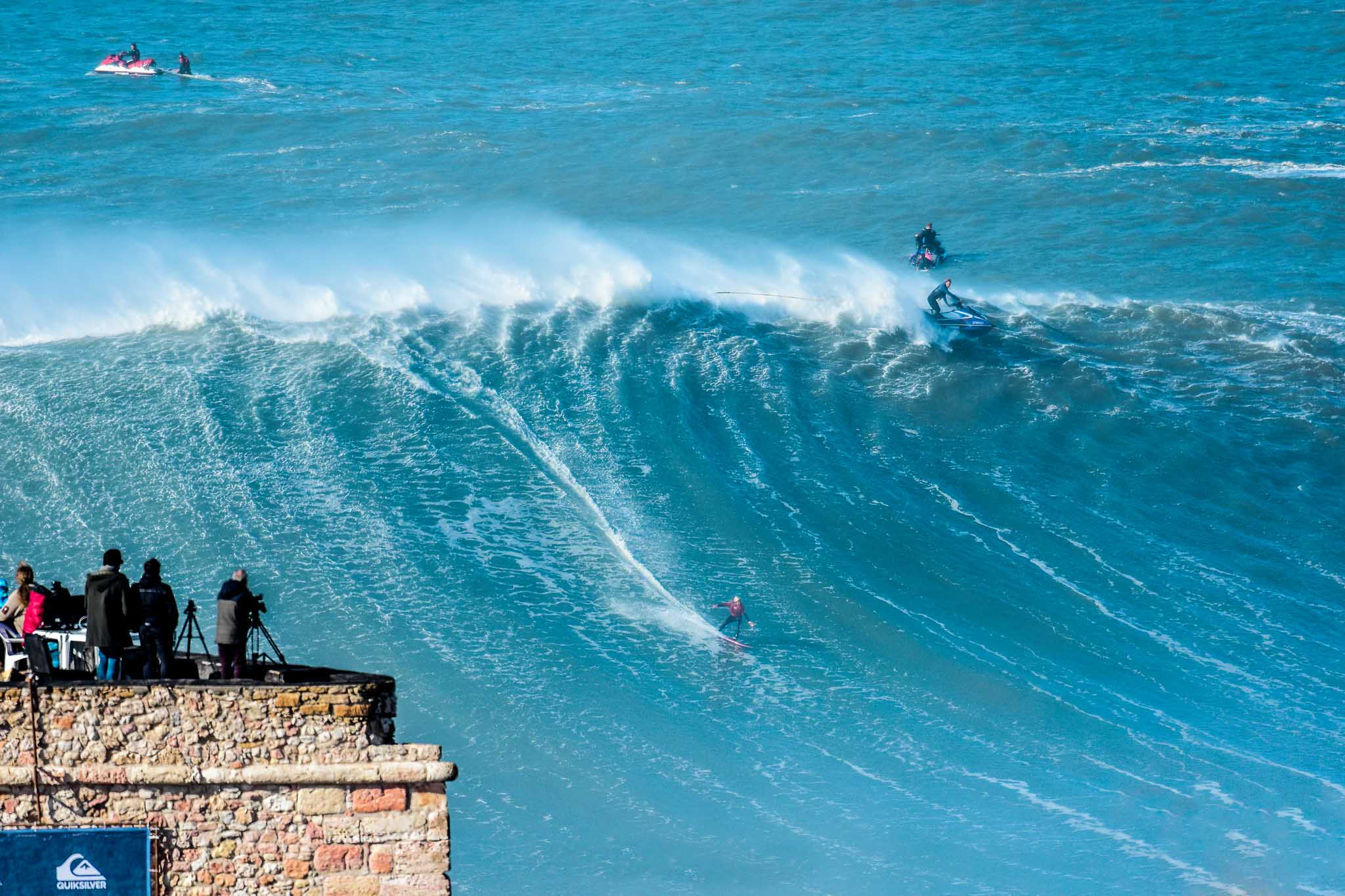
Surfer releases the handle.

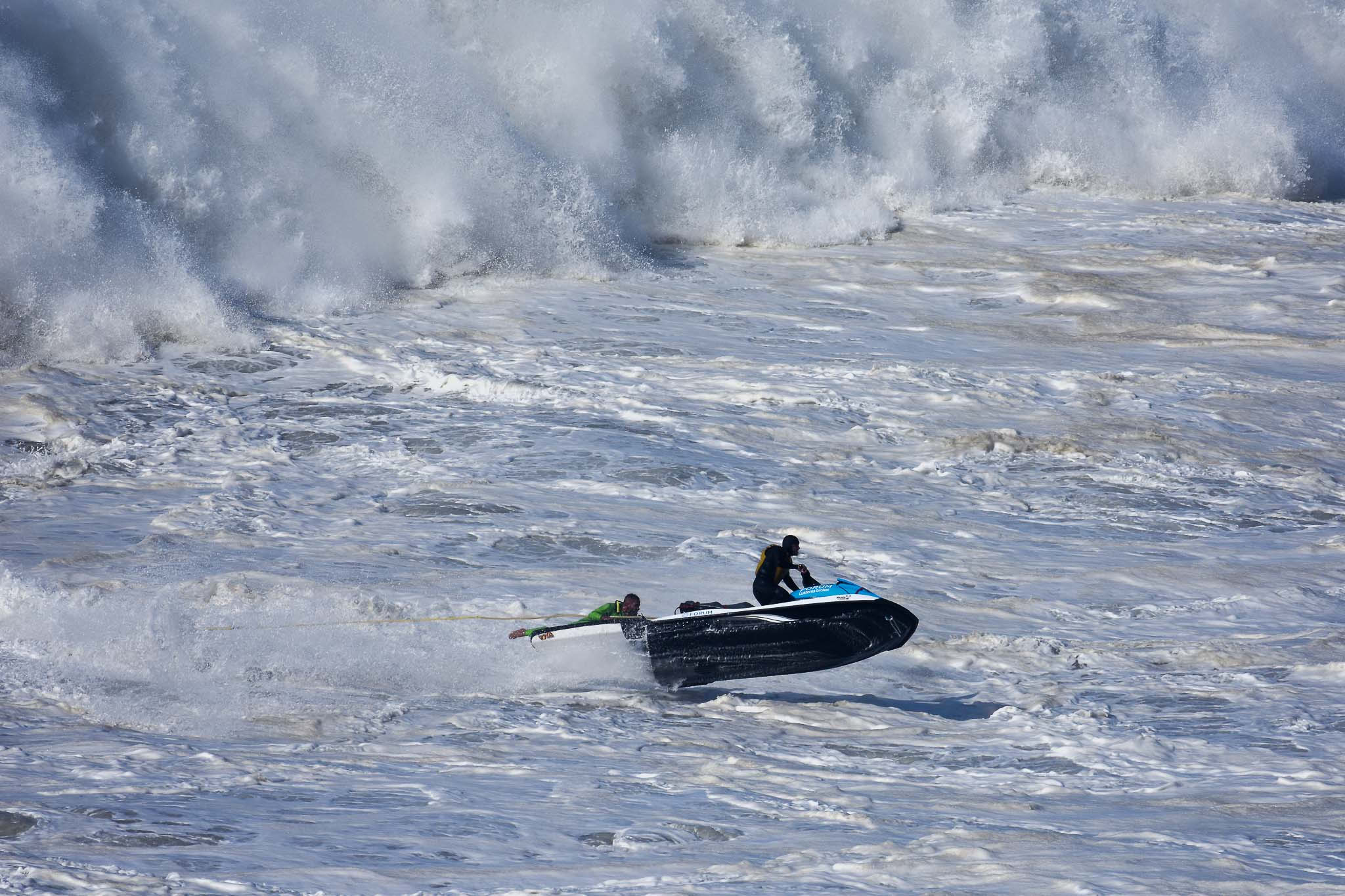
Surfer being rescued from subsequent waves.

Tow-in surfing is a surfing technique which uses artificial assistance to allow the surfer to catch faster-moving waves than was traditionally possible when paddling by hand. Tow-in surfing was invented by surfers who wanted to catch big waves and break the 30 ft (9 m) barrier. It has been one of the biggest breakthroughs in surfing history.

== History ==
Tow-in surfing was pioneered by Laird Hamilton, Buzzy Kerbox, Dave Kalama, and others in the mid 1990s. A surfer is towed into a breaking wave by a partner driving a personal watercraft (PWC, commonly known by the brand name Jet Ski) or a helicopter with an attached tow-line. This method has a demonstrated advantage in situations where the wave is too large (such as Peʻahi off the north side of Maui), or where position on the wave is extremely critical (Teahupoo off southeast Tahiti).

The use of a helicopter for tow-in surfing started to appear in the mid 2000s, and has several advantages over the use of a personal watercraft. The pilot, positioned high above the surfer, is able to spot large waves from farther away and position the surfer accordingly. A helicopter can go faster, and is not affected by the ocean surface like a watercraft, but is much more expensive to operate.

Before tow-in surfing was created, surfers were not capable of catching waves that were between 30 and 50 ft (9 and 15 m) tall on their surfboards made for larger waves called "guns". The biggest wave one could catch before tow-in surfing was in the 20 ft (6 m) range. Tow-in surfing is accomplished by taking a personal watercraft (PWC) and a tow-rope and combining that with a surfer. One person pulls the surfer out to the break on the PWC. When the waves comes, the person on the PWC tows the surfer via the tow-rope into the wave. Once the surfer is in the wave, the rope is dropped. The surfer is then on their own to surf some of the biggest waves in the world.

== Differences ==
Tow-in surfing differs from regular surfing in several different ways. First, the waves are much larger; a surfer has to be towed in to the wave, and there is the risk of a wall of water the size of a three-story building falling down on them. Laird Hamilton said “The sensation is a combination of flying, sailing and just going as fast as you've ever been. Really, it’s just the sensation of speed.”

== Controversy ==
Critics of tow-in surfing decry the noise and exhaust fumes made by PWC engines, as well as the likelihood that new participants can get into predicaments that they have not been trained or conditioned to survive. On the other hand, a skilled team of driver and surfer, who often swap roles in the water during a session, develop a rapport and an understanding of ocean conditions that allows them to proactively watch out for each other.

Environmentalists and surfing purists have passed a proposal to shut down tow-in surfing at Mavericks in Northern California, saying that is hazardous to local wildlife and a nuisance to residents.

== Famous tow-in spots ==
- Praia do Norte, Nazaré, Portugal
- Outer Log Cabins, Oahu, Hawaii
- Todos Santos, Mexico
- Mavericks, Northern California
- Dungeons, Cape Town
- Jaws surf break, Maui
- Aill Na Searrach "Aileen's", Cliffs of Moher, Ireland
- Ilha dos Lobos, Southern Brazil
- Cortes Bank
- Teahupo'o, Tahiti
- Bundoran, Ireland
- Maresias, São Sebastião, Brazil
- Punta de Lobos, Pichilemu, Chile
- Shipstern Bluff, Tasmania, Australia
- Helios Bay
