= Waimea Bay =

Bay on Oahu in Hawaii, United States

Coordinates: 21°38′25″N 158°03′50″W

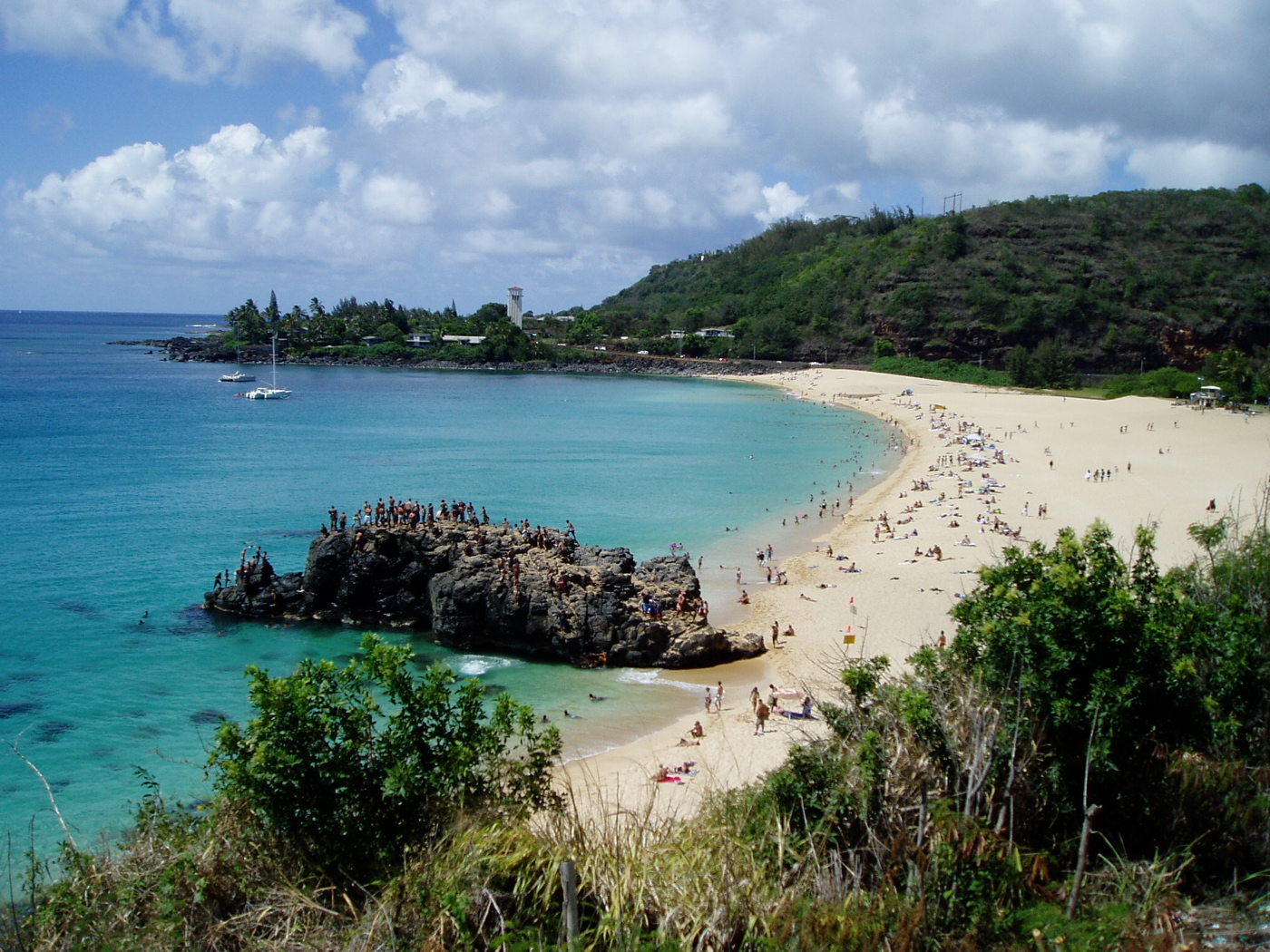
"The Rock" and bay from Kamehameha Highway

Waimea Bay is a crescent-shaped natural bay located in Haleʻiwa on the North Shore of Oʻahu in the Hawaiian Islands, widely known for its big wave surfing. It lies at the mouth of the Waimea River, with the Waimea Valley extending east of Waimea Bay. Waimea means "reddish water" in Hawaiian.

== History ==
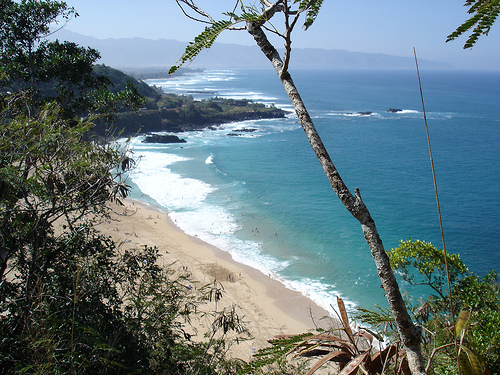
The bay from Puʻu o Mahuka Heiau State Monument

Waimea Valley was densely populated at the time of first contact. On February 27, 1779, Captain Charles Clerke, second in command during the third voyage of James Cook, stopped briefly at Waimea Bay. Clerke had been in command of the expedition for two weeks, following the February 14 killing of Cook at Kealakekua Bay on Hawaiʻi. Waimea Bay was the only Oʻahu anchorage visited by the expedition. The remains of Pu'u o Mahuka, an important heiau (Hawaiian temple), can still be seen above the bay.

== Geography ==
Puʻu o Mahuka Heiau State Monument is a Native Hawaiian historical site located just above the bay, off Pupukea Road. It is a historically important site on the North Shore, as well as providing a view of Waimea Bay and the Waiʻanae Range.

Waimea Bay is located along Kamehameha Highway. The bay is on the north-west side of the highway (at the entrance point).

The Waimea Bay shoreline has been experiencing erosion due to both man-made and natural causes.

Following a series of weather-related landslides in March 2026, emergency slope stabilization began at Waimea Bay on March 18, 2026. The $34.4 million project includes rockfall netting and impact fencing along Kamehameha Highway.

== Surfing ==
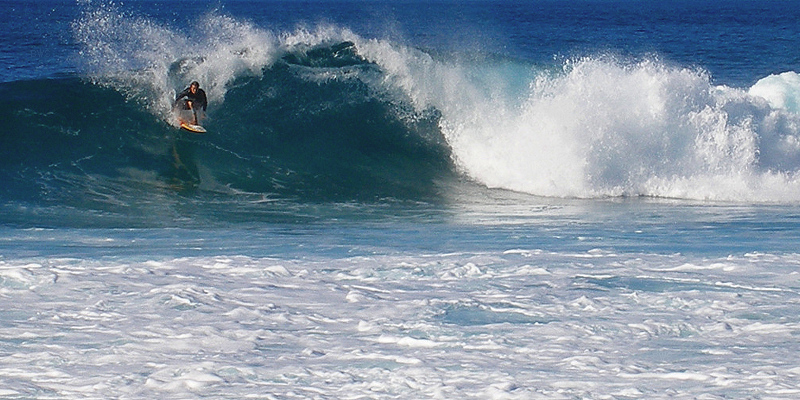
Winter surfer, 2007

In summer, Waimea typically has clear and calm water.

In winter, large waves created by winter storms in the North Pacific make Waimea and other North Shore locations such as Banzai Pipeline and Sunset Beach premier surfing locations. These waves usually reach Oʻahu's North Shore several days in advance of the storm arriving there, often coinciding with North Shore surfing contests.

The surf break at Waimea Bay was significant in the development of big wave surfing. Larger surf at the bay went unridden for years until November 7, 1957 when a handful of surfers finally paddled out and rode the giant waves that break off the northern point of the bay. While the surf only breaks big several times a year, Waimea was the most prestigious big wave surf break in the world for decades. With the advent of tow-in surfing, more and more big wave breaks have been discovered that are far superior in quality to Waimea. However, the bay still holds a significant place even in today's world of big wave surfing.

The Quiksilver Big Wave Invitational in Memory of Eddie Aikau takes place in Waimea Bay to honor the legendary surfer and the first lifeguard of the North Shore of Oahu. Since its inception in 1984, the tournament has only been held eleven times, due to a precondition that open-ocean swells reach a minimum height of 20 feet (6.1 m) before the competition can be held. Open-ocean swells of this height generally translate to wave faces in the bay of 30 feet (9.1 m) to 40 feet (12 m). The most recent tournament was in December 2024.

On January 28, 1998, Hawaii issued its first ever "condition black" legally closing all North Shore beaches including Waimea Bay. The Quiksilver Big Wave Invitational in Memory of Eddie Aikau was canceled due to above-average behemoth surf.

== In popular culture ==
The 1964 film Ride the Wild Surf and the Jan and Dean song "Ride the Wild Surf", which played at the end of the film and became a Top 20 National hit, made Waimea Bay famous.

Waimea Bay is mentioned in the 1963 Beach Boys' song Surfin' U.S.A.

Waimea Bay was not the primary filming location for the early 2000s television series Lost, although some scenes may have been shot in the park in the valley (the downed plane was at Mokuleia at the end of Dillingham airstrip almost to road's end at Kaena Point). The actual main location and filming area was at Kawailoa Beach, about 1/2 mile north of Pueana Point.

Waimea Bay is mentioned in the 2009 Jimmy Buffett song Beautiful Swimmers and the 2021 Old Dominion song Hawaii.

== See also ==
- Big wave surfing
