= Grant Baker =

South African professional surfer, ocean conservationist and entrepreneur

Personal information
- Born: 26 May 1973 (age 53) Durban, South Africa
- Height: 5 ft 11 in (180 cm)
- Weight: 160 lb (73 kg)

Surfing career
- Sport: Surfing
- Sponsors: Vissla, Rip Curl, F-One, Futures, Twig Surfboards
- Major achievements: Three Times Big Wave World Tour Surfing Champion

Surfing specifications
- Stance: Regular (natural) foot (left foot forward)

Grant "Twiggy" Baker (born 26 May 1973) is a South African professional surfer. He is a 3-time world surfing champion, ocean conservationist and entrepreneur

== Career highlights ==
- Winner, 2025-2026 Men’s Biggest Paddle Award at Nazare, Portugal presented by Aquamar
- Winner, 2026 Thriller at Killers at Todos Santos Island, Baja California, Mexico
- Winner, 2022 Men's Biggest Wave Award at Mavericks Awards at Half Moon Bay, California, United States of America
  - 2020 – XXL Ride of the Year (Global Big Wave Awards) - 11 December 2019 for his big wave ride at Jaws, Hawaii
- Winner, 2018-2019 WSL Big Wave World Tour Champion
- Winner, 2018 WSL BWT Nazare Challenge (Nazare, Portugal)
- Winner, 2016-2017 WSL Big Wave World Tour Champion
- Winner, 2016 WSL BWT Puerto Escondido Challenge (Puerto Escondido, Oaxaca, Mexico)
- Winner, 2013-2014 WSL Big Wave World Tour Champion
- Winner, 2014 WSL Body Glove Mavericks Invitational (Half Moon Bay, California, USA)
- Winner, 2013 WSL Arnette Punta Galea Challenge (Bilbao, Basque Country, Spain)
- Winner, 2009 Quiksilver Ceremonial Punta de Lobos (Pichilemu, Cardenal Caro, O’Higgins, Chile)
- 2008 – XXL Biggest Wave Winner Global Big Wave Awards) - 27 July 2007 for his big wave ride at Dungeons, Cape Town, South Africa
- Winner, 2006 Mavericks Invitational(Half Moon Bay, California, USA)

== Awards ==
- 2025-2026 - Men’s Biggest Paddle Award at Nazare, Portugal presented by Aquamar
- 2026 - Thriller at Killers Champion at Todos Santos Island, Baja California, Mexico
- 2022 - Men's Biggest Wave Award at Mavericks Awards at Half Moon Bay, California, United States of America
- 2020 – XXL Ride of the Year (Global Big Wave Awards) - 11 December 2019 for his big wave ride at Jaws, Hawaii
- 2018-2019 WSL Big Wave World Tour Champion
- 2018 – Nazare Challenge Champion (Nazare, Portugal)
- 2016-2017 – WSL Big Wave World Tour Champion
- 2016 - WSL Big Wave World Tour Puerto Escondido Challenge Winner (Puerto Escondido, Oaxaca, Mexico)
- 2014 – XXL (Global Big Wave Awards) Surfline Best Overall Performance / Biggest Wave
- 2013-2014 – WSL Big Wave World Tour Champion
- 2014 - Body Glove Mavericks Invitational Champion at Half Moon Bay, California, United States of America
- 2013 - Arnette Punta Galea Champion (Bilbao, Basque Country, Spain)
- 2010 – XXL Ride of the Year Winner Global Big Wave Awards) - 13 February 2010 for his big wave ride at Mavericks, California
- 2009 - Quiksilver Ceremonial Punta de Lobos Champion at Pichilemu, Cardenal Caro, O’Higgins, Chile
- 2008 – XXL Biggest Wave Winner Global Big Wave Awards) - 27 July 2007 for his big wave ride at Dungeons, Cape Town, South Africa
- 2006 – Mavericks Invitational Champion at Half Moon Bay, California, United States of America
