= Mavericks Beach =

Surfing location in California, US

Mavericks
- Surf break
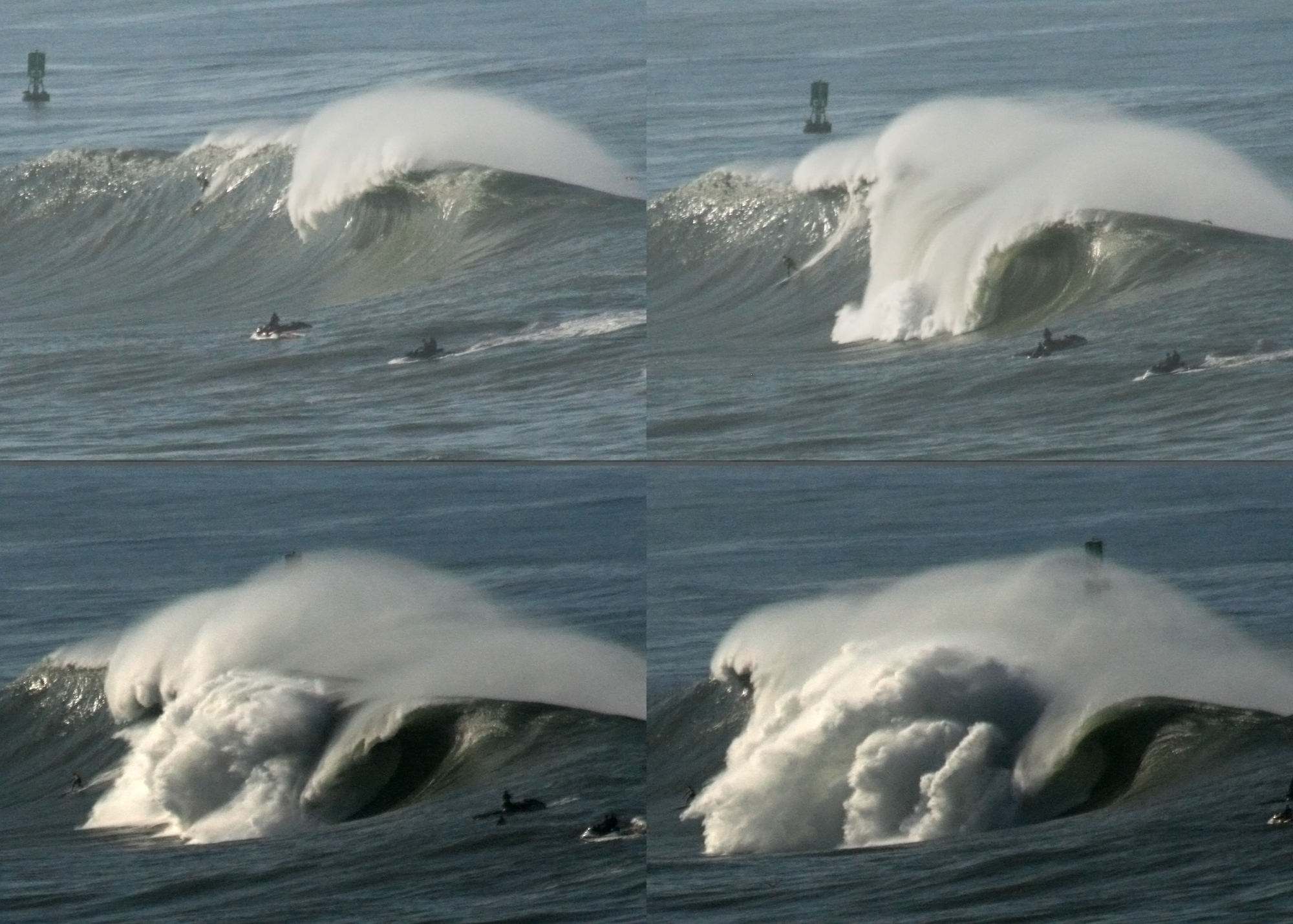
- 4-frame image that shows the break of Mavericks

- Location within California Location within San Francisco Bay Area Location within the United States
- Coordinates: 37°29′29″N 122°30′30″W
- Location: Pillar Point Harbor, California, US

Mavericks Beach (or simply Mavericks) is a surfing location in the San Francisco Bay Area. It is just outside of the breakwater of Pillar Point Harbor, near the coastal community of Princeton-by-the-Sea, just north of the town of Half Moon Bay. After a strong winter storm in the northern Pacific Ocean, waves can routinely crest at over 25 ft (8 m) and top out at over 60 ft (18 m). The break is caused by an unusually shaped underwater rock formation.

Mavericks is a winter destination for some of the world's best big wave surfers. From 1999 to 2016, an invitation-only contest called Titans of Mavericks was held there during most winter surfing seasons, whenever the winter wave conditions there were deemed to be suitable to meet the needs of the contest.

== Origin of the name ==
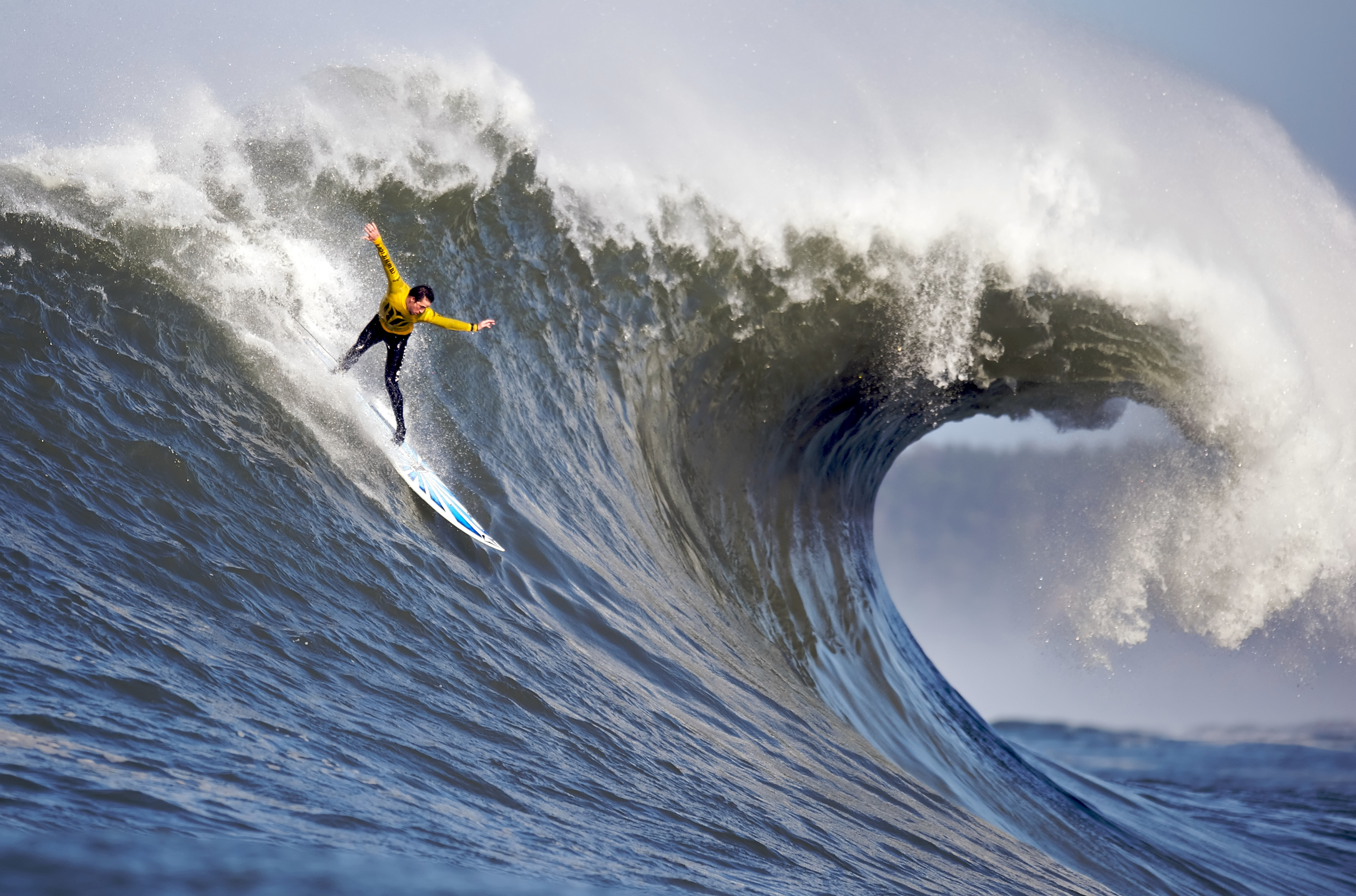
2010 competition

In early March 1967, Alex Matienzo, Jim Thompson, and Dick Notmeyer surfed the distant waves of Pillar Point. With them was Matienzo's roommate's white-haired German Shepherd, Maverick, who was accustomed to swimming with his owner and Matienzo while they were surfing. The three surfers left Maverick on shore, but he swam out to them. Finding the conditions unsafe for the dog, Matienzo tied him up before rejoining the others. The riders had limited success that day as they surfed overhead peaks about 1/4 mi (400 m) from shore, just along the rocks that are visible from shore; they deemed the bigger outside waves too dangerous. The surfers named the location after Maverick, who seemed to have gotten the most pleasure from the experience.

== Description ==
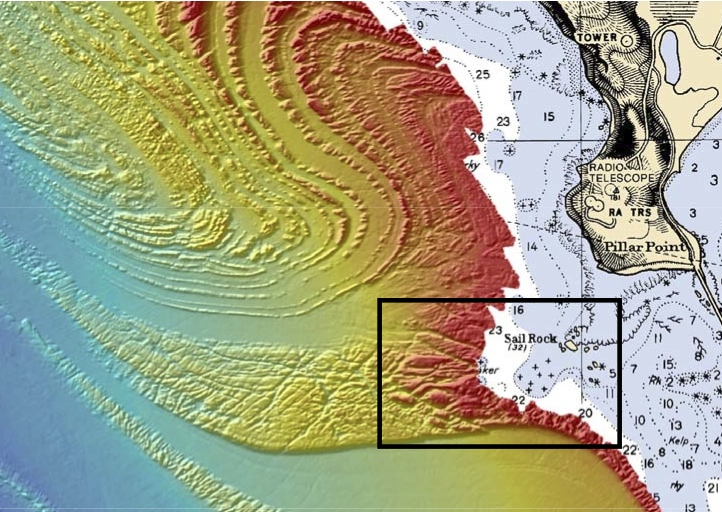
A long ramp slopes up toward the surface at Mavericks.

=== Sea floor ===
Sea-floor maps released by the US National Oceanic and Atmospheric Administration in 2007 revealed the mechanisms behind Mavericks' waves. A long, sloping ramp leads to the surface. The ramp slows the propagation of the wave over it. The wave over the deep troughs on each side of the ramp continues at full speed forming two angles in the wavefront centered over the boundaries between the ramp and the troughs. The result of this is a U-shaped or V-shaped wavefront on the ramp that contains the wave energy from the full width of the ramp. This U-shaped or V-shaped wave then collapses into a small area at the top center of the ramp with tremendous force.

=== Left Hander ===
The left at Mavericks is rarely ridden, as the wave tends to be unreliable. It can be a much faster ride than the right, shooting riders down a quicker pipe barrel. Surfline says the left is "a short-lived explosion of hell and spitfire."

== History ==
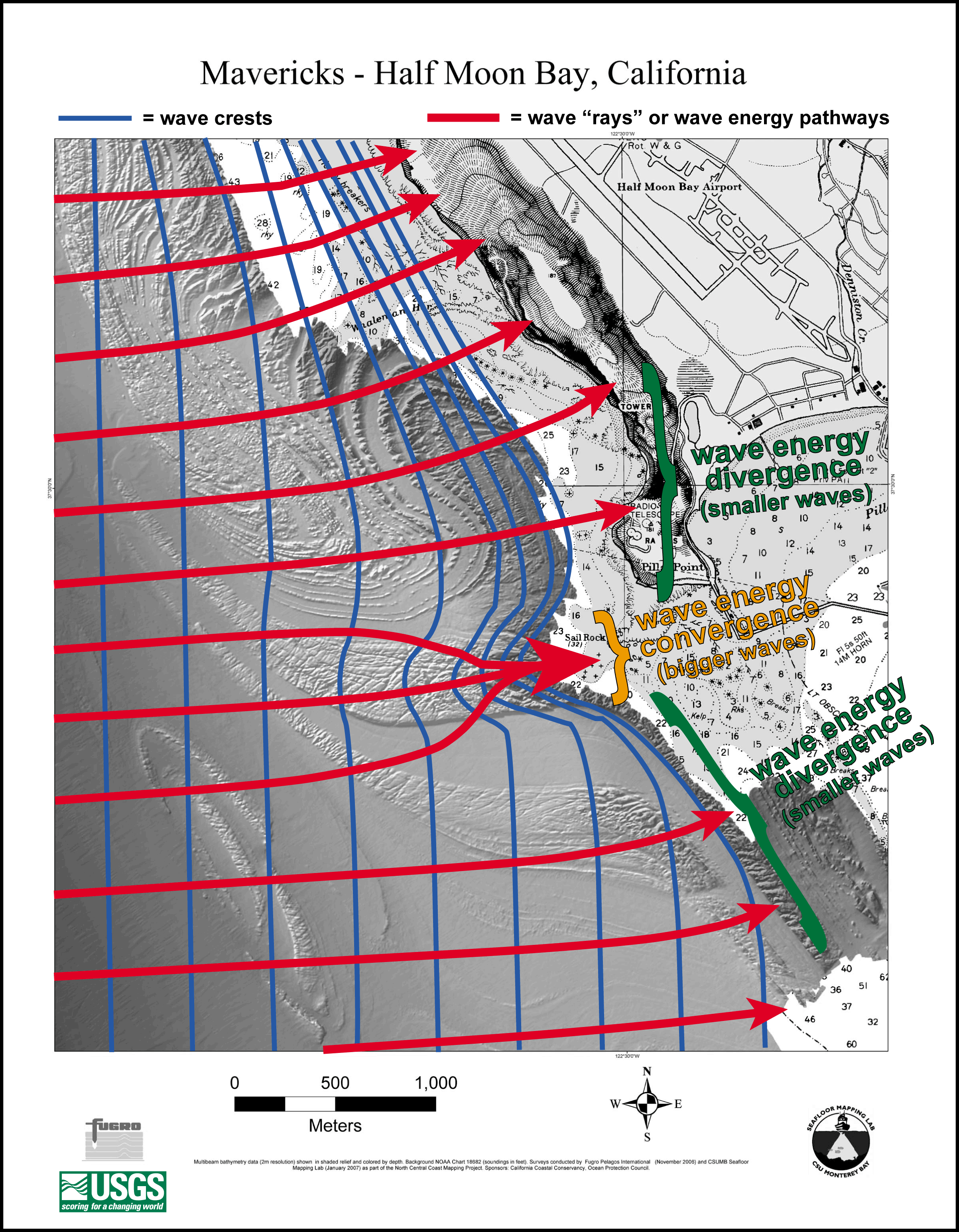
Effect of bathymetry on Mavericks' waves

Jeff Clark grew up in Half Moon Bay, watching Mavericks from Half Moon Bay High School and Pillar Point. At that time the location was thought too dangerous to surf. He conceived the possibility of riding Hawaii-sized waves in Northern California. In 1975 at age 17 and with the waves topping out at 20–24 ft (6–7.5 m), Clark paddled out alone to face the break. He caught multiple left-breaking waves, thereby becoming the first documented person to tackle Mavericks head-on.

Other than a few of Clark's friends who had paddled out and had seen Mavericks for themselves, no big wave surfers believed in its existence. Popular opinion held that there simply were no large waves in California.

Dave Schmidt (brother of big wave legend Richard Schmidt) and Tom Powers, both from Santa Cruz, were two of the next people to surf at Mavericks, surfing with Clark on January 22, 1990. John Raymond, from Pacifica, Johathan Galili, from Tel Aviv, Israel, and Mark Renneker, from San Francisco, surfed Mavericks a few days later.

=== Popularization ===
In 1990, a photo of Mavericks taken by Clark's friend Steve Tadin was published in Surfer magazine, generating interest in Mavericks. More photos of Mavericks appeared in surfing magazines, and before long, filmmaker Gary Medeiros released a movie, Waves of Adventure in the Red Triangle. As news of Mavericks spread, many big-wave surfers came and surfed there.

=== Death of Mark Foo ===
On December 23, 1994, during a week of huge swells, notable Hawaiian big-wave riders Mark Foo, Ken Bradshaw and Mike Parsons visited Mavericks. In the late morning, Foo rode on a late takeoff into an 18 ft (5.5 m) wave, caught the edge of his surfboard on the surface, and fell forward into a wipe out near the bottom of the wave. A few hours later, a fellow surfer traveling back to shore on a boat noticed a body in the water, which was identified as Foo. The only visible injury was a small cut on the forehead. Many surfers believe that the fall knocked the wind out of Foo and he was tied down by his leash to a rock formation.

The accident afforded Mavericks greater notoriety and prompted the formation of the Mavericks Water Patrol by Frank Quirarte and Clark. The accident also triggered a continuing discourse around the safe use of surfboard leashes while surfing extreme waves. Many believed that Foo's surfboard leash may have contributed to his death. Leash proponents defend it as a useful convenience and as insurance against losing the surfboard, a form of flotation device, a means for a fallen surfer to find the surface by following the leash cord to the buoyant board. Opponents argue that a leash can cause the rider to collide with their board in a wipe out and that the leash can also loop around the surfer's arms, legs or the neck when underwater. Quick-release velcro leashes have since become standard surfing equipment to address some of these risks.

=== Death of Sion Milosky ===
Sion Milosky, an accomplished big-wave surfer, died at Mavericks on March 16, 2011. Milosky, 35, of Kalaheo, Kauai, Hawaii, apparently drowned after enduring a two-wave hold down around 6:30 pm. Twenty minutes after the incident, Nathan Fletcher found Milosky's body floating at the Pillar Point Harbor mouth.

Milosky had been named the North Shore Underground Surfer of the Year in February 2011. He used some of his $25,000 prize to travel to Half Moon Bay to catch one of the last big swells of the season at Mavericks.

=== Women at Mavericks ===
In 1999, Sarah Gerhardt became the first woman to surf Mavericks. In 2018, after a long fight, women were first included in the formal Titans of Mavericks surf competition, also receiving equal prize money.

=== World Records ===
In 2001, Carlos Burle won the Billabong XXL Big Wave Award by riding a 68 foot (20.7 m) tall wave at Mavericks.

On 23 December 2024, Alessandro "Alo" Slebir rode an estimated 108 foot (32.9 m) tall wave at Mavericks, which would exceed the current world record by over 20 feet. The wave height was estimated by the Mavericks Rescue Team.

== Invitational Surfing Contest ==
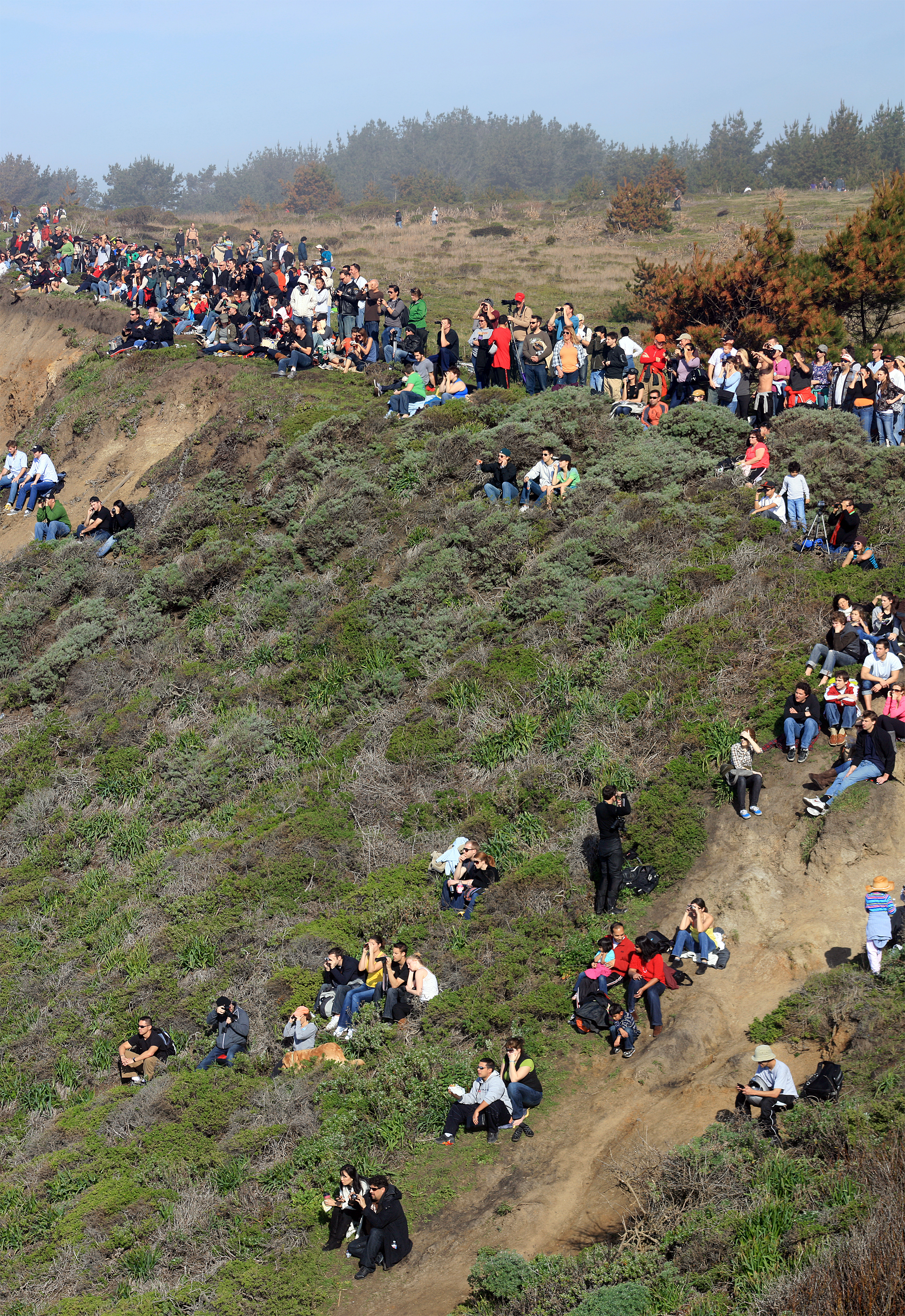
Spectators of Mavericks contest in 2010

The first surfing contest at Mavericks was held in 1999, as the Mavericks Invitational. The competition later came to be known as the Titans of Mavericks invitational. Organizers would invite a number big wave surfers annually to compete in the one-day event, but it was only held if wave conditions were favorable during the competition season (which season ran from November 1-March 31). In 2019, after two years of cancelled competitions, the World Surf League announced that the contest had been canceled indefinitely, citing "various logistical challenges" and "the inability to run the event the last two seasons." The competition has not been held since.

The Mavericks Awards is, as of 2022 a new video performance contest where big wave surfers and videographers submit their best surf content of Mavericks each season. There are 3 categories for men and 3 categories for women include Biggest Wave, Ride of the Year, and Performer of the Year.

== In media ==
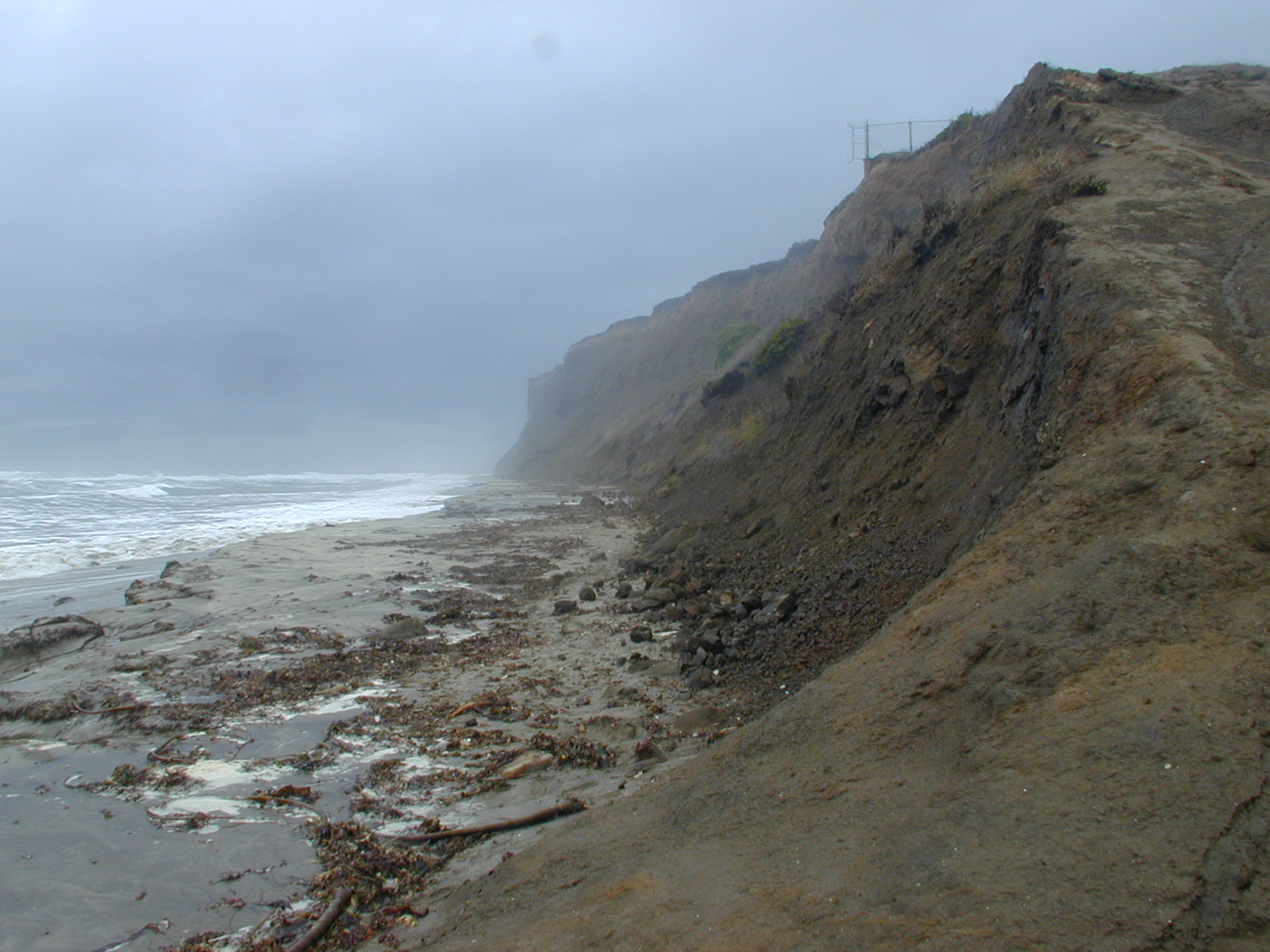
Mavericks is off the coast of Pillar Point (pictured).

In the film Zoolander, Owen Wilson's entourage includes a big wave surfer from Mavericks.

Chasing Mavericks, a 2012 biopic about Mavericks surfer Jay Moriarity, starred Gerard Butler as Frosty Hesson, Abigail Spencer as Brenda Hesson, Frosty's wife, Jonny Weston as Jay Moriarity, Elisabeth Shue as Christy Moriarity and Leven Rambin as Kim Moriarity. Maya Rains plays Roque Hesson, while Patrick and Asher Tesler (twins) portray Lake, son of Frosty and Brenda. Moriarty's spectacular wipeout in 1994 had landed the 16-year-old surfer in the pages of The New York Times and on the cover of Surfer magazine. On December 19, 2011, film star Butler survived a near-death accident, pounded by 3.5–5 m (12–16 ft) waves. Butler was held underwater for several waves and dragged through rocks until rescued by a safety worker on a jet ski. According to eyeforfilm.co.uk, "Butler was knocked off his board by a freak wave. He was trapped underwater as two more waves went over him, and witnesses say he took the force of four or five waves to the head. He was also dragged through rocks before rescuers managed to reach him and get him to the shore. Butler was conscious when pulled from the water and spent the next sixteen hours in Stanford Medical Center."

On June 10, 2013, at its Worldwide Developers Conference, Apple announced that the latest version of its Mac operating system OS X (version 10.9) would be entitled Mavericks. Apple said their new operating software generations would be named after places in California that have inspired them.

== See also ==
- List of surfing records
