= List of surfing records =

== Largest (measured) waves surfed ==
Number	Height	Surfer	Place	Date	Notes/Event
1	86 feet (26.2 m)	(Germany) Sebastian Steudtner	(Portugal) Praia do Norte, Nazaré	29 October 2020	Current Guinness World Record.
2	80 feet (24.4 m)	(Brazil) Rodrigo Koxa	(Portugal) Praia do Norte, Nazaré	8 November 2017	Previous Guinness World Record 2017–2020. Awarded the Quiksilver XXL Biggest Wave Award by the World Surf League (WSL).
3	78 feet (23.8 m)	(United States) Garrett McNamara	(Portugal) Praia do Norte, Nazaré	1 November 2011	Guinness World Record 2011–2017.
4	77 feet (23.5 m)	(United States) Mike Parsons	(United States) Cortes Bank, North Pacific Ocean	5 January 2008	Guinness World Record 2008–2011.
5	73.5 feet (22.4 m)	(Brazil) Maya Gabeira	(Portugal) Praia do Norte, Nazaré	11 February 2020	Female World Record. cbdMD XXL Biggest Wave Award
6	73.0 feet (22.3 m)	(Italy) Francisco Porcella	(Portugal) Praia do Norte, Nazaré	24 October 2016	
7	71.0 feet (21.6 m)	(Germany) Sebastian Steudtner	(Portugal) Praia do Norte, Nazaré	11 December 2014	
7	71.0 feet (21.6 m)	(United States) Yuri Soledade	(United States) Jaws beach, Peʻahi	25 February 2016	
9	70.5 feet (21.5 m)	(France) Justine Dupont	(Portugal) Praia do Norte, Nazaré	11 February 2020	
10	70 feet (21.3 m)	(United States) Kai Lenny	(Portugal) Praia do Norte, Nazaré	11 February 2020	cbdMD XXL Biggest Wave Award
10	70 feet (21.3 m)	(United States) Pete Cabrinha	(United States) Jaws beach, Peʻahi	15 January 2016	Awarded the Billabong XXL Big Wave Award and $70,000.
12	68 feet (20.7 m)	(Brazil) Carlos Burle	(United States) Mavericks, Northern California	21 November 2001	Awarded the Billabong XXL Big Wave Award.
12	68 feet (20.7 m)	(Brazil) Maya Gabeira	(Portugal) Praia do Norte, Nazaré	18 January 2018	
12	68 feet (20.7 m)	(United States) Brad Gerlach	Todos Santos, Mexico	21 December 2005	
15	66 feet (20.1 m)	(United States) Makua Rothman	(United States) Jaws beach, Peʻahi	26 November 2002	Awarded the 2003 Billabong XXL Award
15	66 feet (20.1 m)	(United States) Mike Parsons	(United States) Cortes Bank, North Pacific Ocean	19 January 2001	Billabong XXL Big Wave Award. Awarded $66,000; the highest prize ever awarded in the history of professional surfing
15	66 feet (20.1 m)	(United States) Sebastian Steudtner	(United States) Jaws beach, Peʻahi	7 December 2009	
18	65 feet (19.8 m)	(United States) Greg Long	Dungeons, South Africa	30 July 2006	
19	64 feet (19.5 m)	(United States) Mike Parsons	(United States) Jaws beach, Peʻahi	7 January 2002	Wave was filmed by helicopter and used as the opening scene of the 2003 film Billabong Odyssey
20	63 feet (19.2 m)	(United States) Aaron Gold	(United States) Jaws beach, Peʻahi	15 January 2016	
21	61 feet (18.6 m)	(United States) Shawn Dollar	(United States) Cortes Bank, North Pacific Ocean	21 December 2012	Paddle-in world record (without the help of a tow) Billabong XXL Big Wave Award
21	61 feet (18.6 m)	(South Africa) Grant Baker	Tafelberg Reef, South Africa	9 August 2008	

=== Other claims ===
There are various ways to measure the height of a wave. Miguel Moreira, professor at University of Lisbon's Faculty of Human Kinetics (FMHUL) denotes that "in order to announce world records, all waves should be measured using the same method". WSL has its own method of measuring the height of a wave and has partnered with Guinness World Records to award world record certificates. Below are some claims of surfed waves that were/are not yet recognized by WSL:

- Alessandro "Alo" Slebir - On 23 December 2024, Slebir rode an estimated 108 foot (32.9 m) tall wave at Mavericks, California, which would exceed the current world record by over 20 feet. The wave height was estimated by the Mavericks Rescue Team, but has not yet been confirmed by Guinness World Records.
- Andrew Cotton - In January 2014, Cotton, was towed into an estimated 80-foot (24.3 meters) wave at Praia do Norte. His feat has yet to be ratified by Guinness World Records.
- António Laureano - On 29 October 2020, Laureano, 18 at the time, rode a wave estimated by FMHUL to be around 101.4 feet (30.9 meters) at Praia do Norte. This measurement is still awaiting confirmation by WSL.
- Benjamin Sanchis - On 11 December 2014, Sanchis rode a wave labelled as 108 ft (33 m) by the media. The wave was deemed by Billabong as a "partial ride" (meaning he did not ride it to completion).
- Carlos Burle - On the 28th October, 2013, Burle rode a wave that was claimed to be 100 feet on Praia do Norte.
- Garrett McNamara - Apart from his 2011 world record, McNamara has reportedly surfed to what was dubbed by the media as a "100 foot wave" on 28 January 2013 at Praia do Norte. McNamara has said in a 2013 interview he never claimed the wave to be 100 feet, but said the wave definitely felt bigger than the previous record.

== Longest kitesurfing journeys ==
Distance	Surfer	Place	Date	Notes/Event
1,184 kilometres (735.7 mi)	Kite the Reef (team)	(Australia) Vlassoff Cay to Cape York	between August 13 and 21, 2015	Longest kitesurfing journey by a team.
862 kilometres (535.6 mi)	(Portugal) Francisco Lufinha	(Portugal) Lisbon to Madeira	between July 5 and 7, 2015	Longest non-stop kitesurfing journey by a man.
489 kilometres (303.9 mi)	(Germany) Anke Brandt	(Bahrain) Amwaj Islands to Al Dar Island	April 2016	Longest continuous kitesurfing journey by a woman.

== Longest wave surfed by a dog ==
Abbie Girl, an Australian Kelpie, completed a distance of 107.2 metres (351.7 ft) at a dog surfing contest at Huntington Beach on October 18, 2011.
