= Praia do Norte (Nazaré) =

Beach in Nazaré, Portugal

- Beach
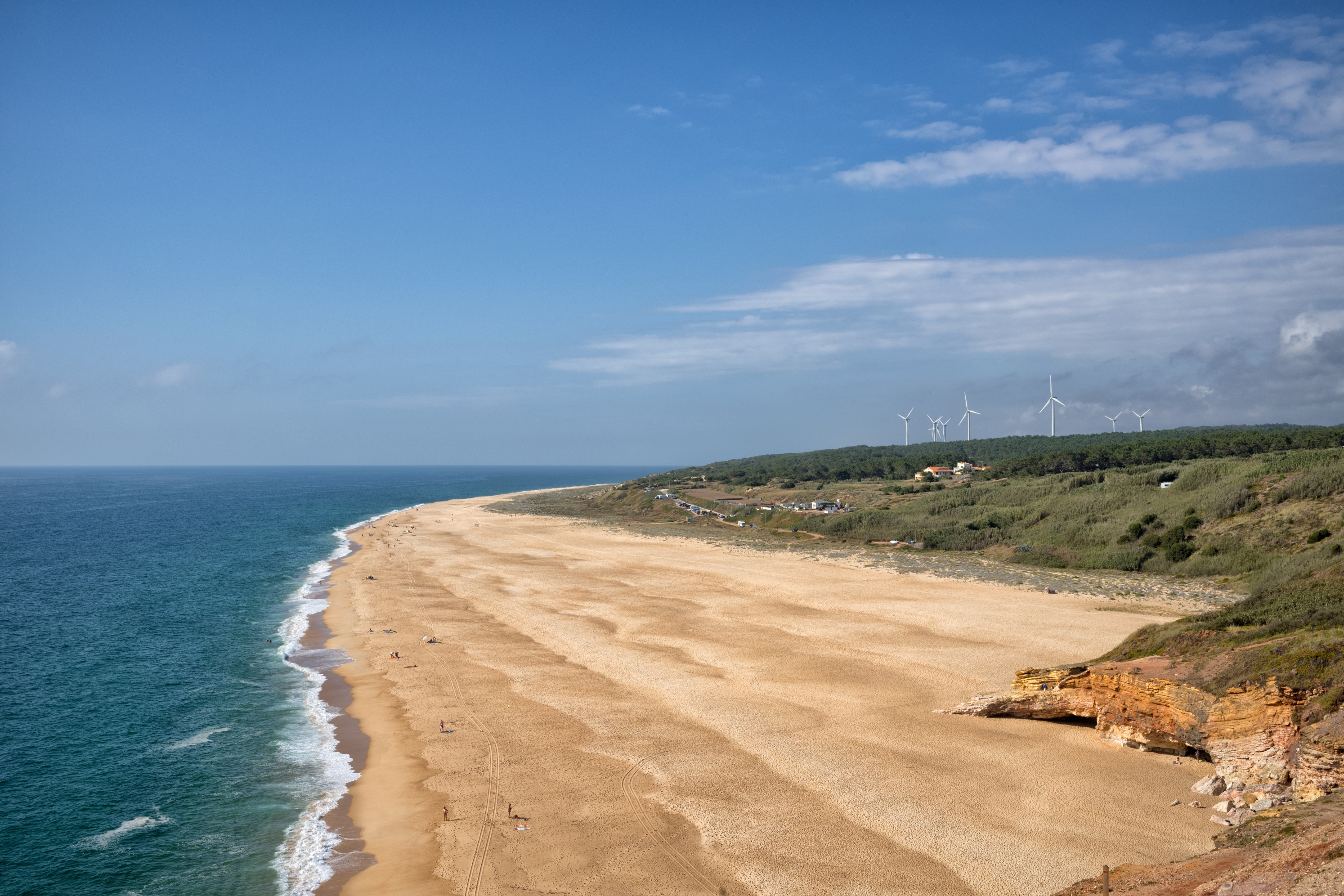
- View of the beach from the Fort of São Miguel Arcanjo

- Location of Praia do Norte
- Coordinates: 39°36′43″N 9°05′08″W
- Location: Nazaré, Oeste region and Leiria District, Portugal

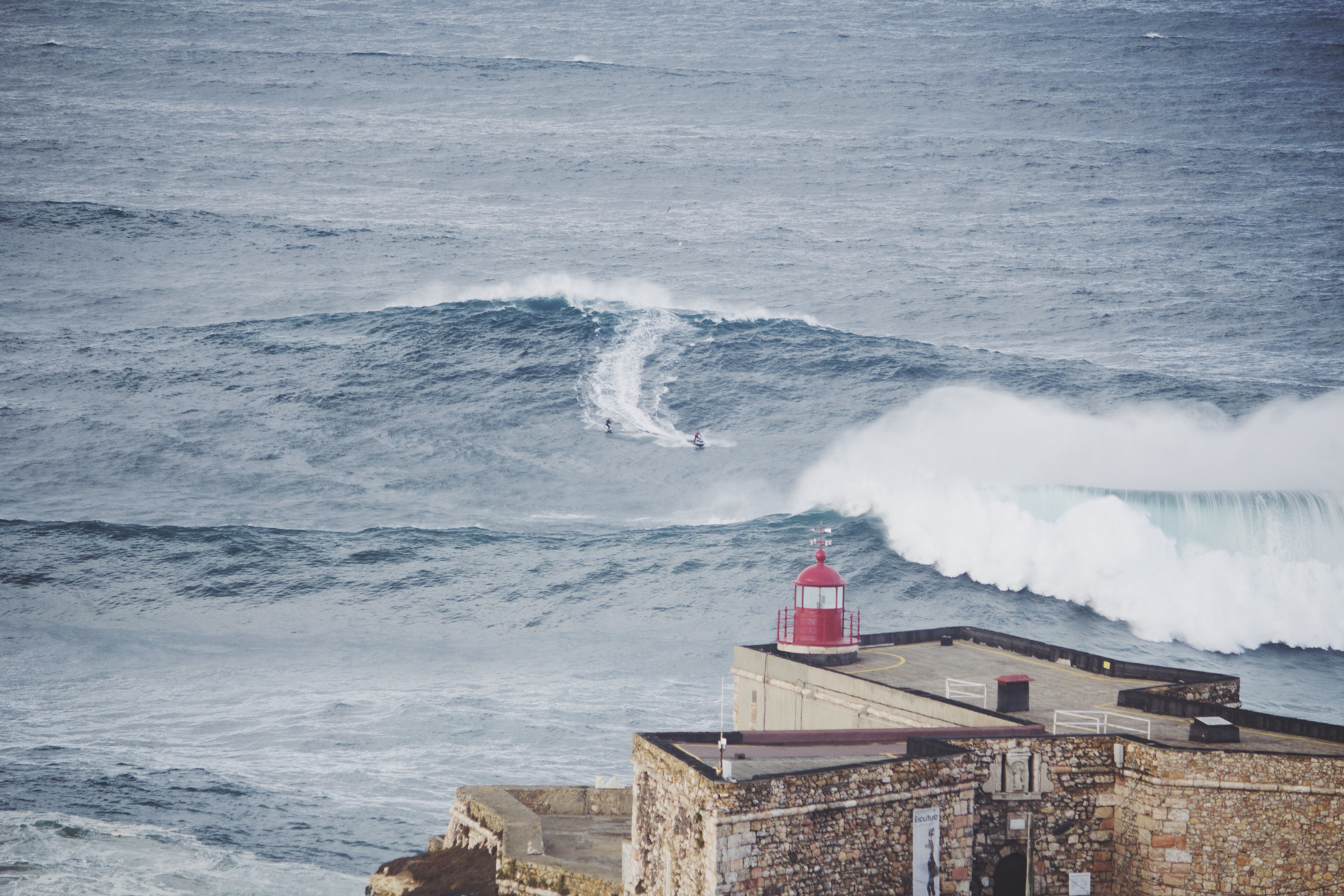
Tow-in surfing near the Fort of São Miguel Arcanjo lighthouse

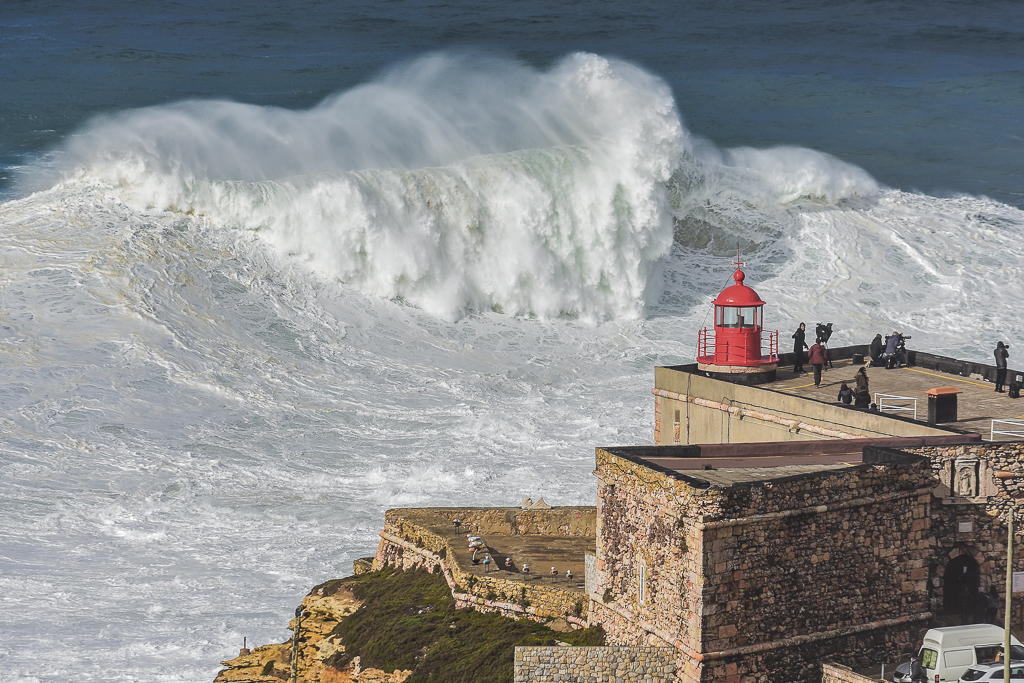
Giant breaking waves in Praia do Norte

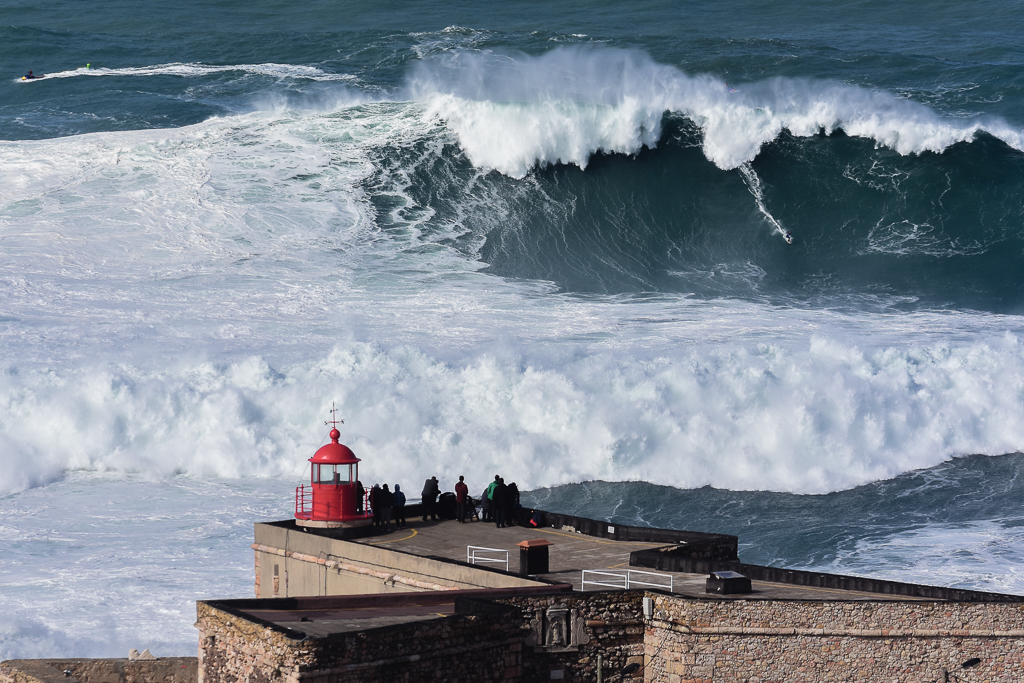
The Praia do Norte (North Beach) was listed on the Guinness World Records for the biggest waves ever surfed (formed under the influence of the Nazaré Canyon)

Praia do Norte (‘North Beach’) is a beach located in Nazaré, Portuguese Oeste region, which due to its giant white breaking waves is famed for its surfing conditions. Nazaré's waves were listed on the Guinness Book of Records for the biggest waves ever surfed and have also been featured multiple times on the Billabong XXL awards in the categories of Biggest Wave and Ride of the Year.

== Overview ==
Praia do Norte's very high breaking waves form due to the presence of the underwater Nazaré Canyon. The canyon creates constructive interference between incoming swell waves which tends to make the waves much larger.

The TUDOR Nazaré Tow Surfing Challenge is a big wave surfing competition held at Praia do Norte every year during the winter months. It features some of the world's best big wave surfers competing on massive waves, often reaching 40-50 feet in height. The event is part of the WSL Big Wave Surfing series.

In November 2011, surfer Garrett McNamara, who resides in Hawai'i, surfed a record-breaking giant wave: 23.8 m (78 ft) from trough to crest, at Praia do Norte in Nazaré, Portugal. On 28 January 2013, McNamara returned to the spot and successfully surfed a wave that appeared even larger, but is awaiting an official measurement as of November 2018.

On November 8, 2017, Brazilian surfer Rodrigo Koxa took the record by surfing an 24.4 m (80 ft) wave at Praia do Norte which was captured in a video that went viral over social media. On the same day, Portuguese surfer Nuno "Stru" Figueiredo, broke the world record for the biggest wave to be surfed in kitesurf with a 19-meter wave (62 ft), a record that lasted until the 22nd of January 2023, when Patri McLaughlin took the record at Jaws (beach) in Hawaii.

In January 2018, Brazilian surfer Maya Gabeira got the record for biggest wave surfed by a woman at 20.8 m (68 ft) a record that Gabeira would break again on February 11, 2020, by surfing a wave that measured 22.4 m (73.5 ft).

On October 29, 2020, German surfer Sebastian Steudtner broke the previous record by surfing an 26.2 m (86 ft) wave.

On February 24, 2024, Steudtner once again rode potentially the biggest wave ever recorded that measured at 28.5 m (93.7 ft) with the collaboration of Porsche Engineering; however, this wave has yet to be declared as the official world record.

== See also ==
- List of beaches in Portugal
- Supertubos
- List of surfing records
