= Nazaré Canyon =

Submarine canyon in the North Atlantic Ocean

Coordinates: 39.51°N 9.92°W

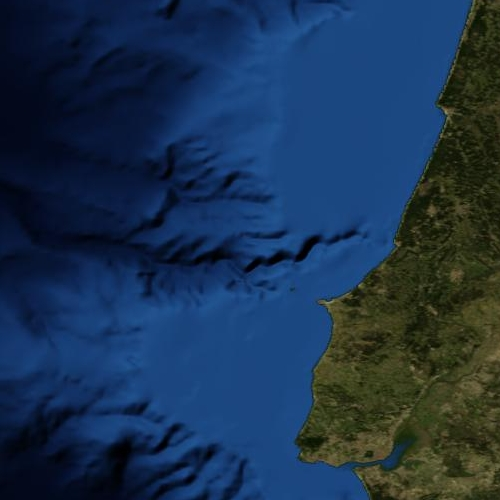
The Nazaré Canyon off the coast of Portugal.

The Nazaré Canyon is a submarine canyon just off the coast of Nazaré in the Oeste region of Portugal, in the eastern North Atlantic Ocean. It is the largest submarine canyon in Europe, reaching depths of about 5,000 metres (16,000 ft) and a length of about 230 kilometres (140 mi).

The canyon is being studied as part of the EU HERMES project using a remotely operated vehicle. The project is investigating the specialized canyon ecosystems, sediment transport and deposition, and the way in which the canyon influences and is affected by local ocean circulation.

== Sections ==
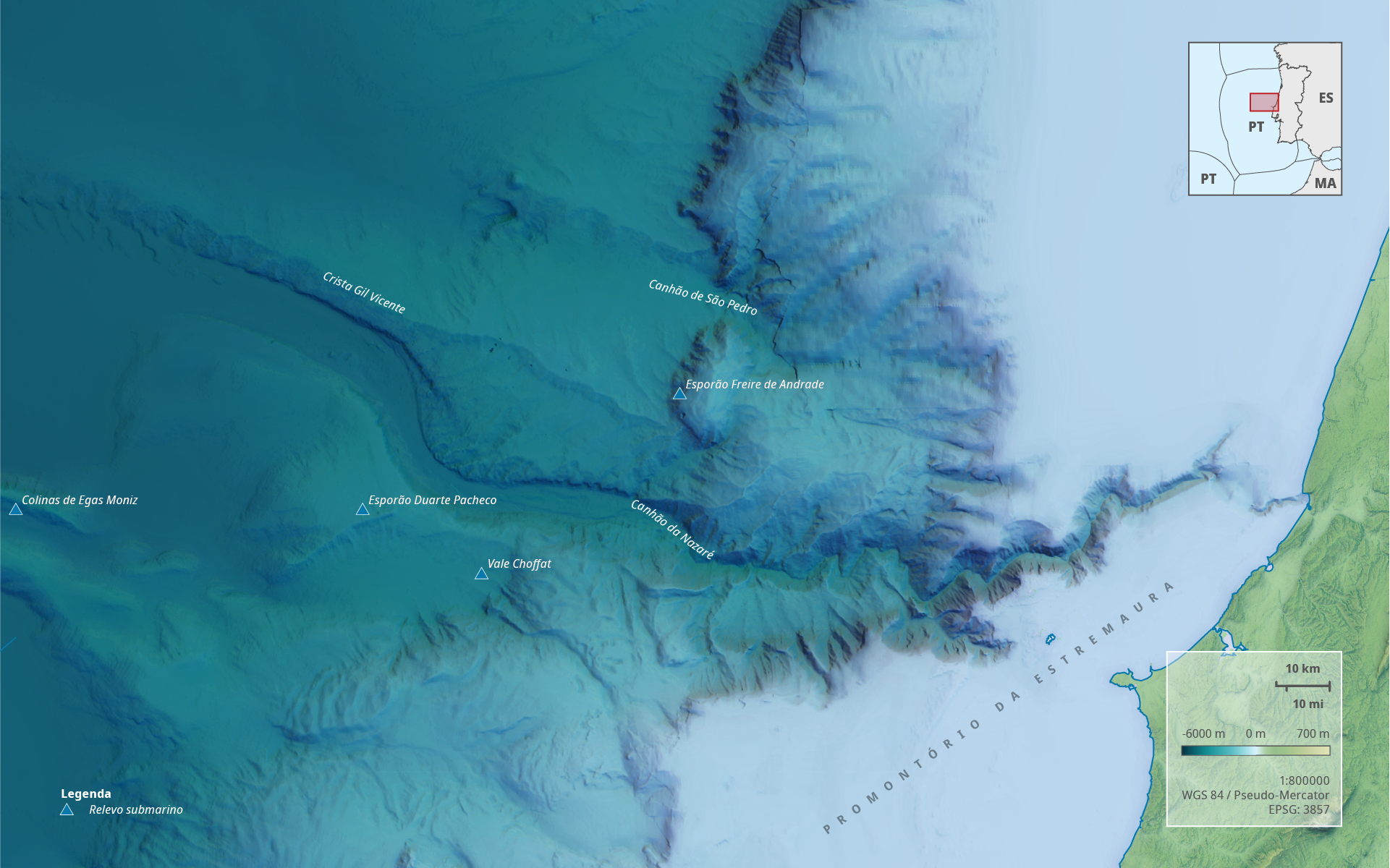
Geomorphology of the submarine canyon.

The canyon can be divided into three distinct sections. The upper section extends from about 1 km (0.62 mi) off Nazaré to the edge of the continental shelf (up to 60 kilometres (37 mi)); it is composed of ravines and has a distinct V-shaped profile. The middle section of the canyon, defined by a tear in the 57 km (35 mi) long continental slope, extends from the edge of the platform to a depth of 4,050 m (13,290 ft). In this section, the canyon retains a V shape and is highly sinuous, with large ravines on the walls bordering the deepest part that defines the canyon's axis (called the thalweg). The bottom section is the deepest end of the canyon, with depths greater than 4,050 m (13,290 ft), and extends for about 94 km (58 mi). In this section, the thalweg loses the sharp characteristics of the shallower sections, shifting from a V-shaped profile to a flat, slightly sinuous floor. At a depth of 4,970 m (16,310 ft), 211 kilometres (131 mi) from the headland, the canyon reaches the Iberian Abyssal Plain.

== Dynamics ==
The Nazaré Canyon functions as a ripple polarizer. Waves are able to travel at a much greater speed due to the geological fault, arriving at the coast with virtually no dissipation of energy. Praia do Norte consistently presents waves significantly larger than the rest of the Portuguese coast due to the canyon. The predominant northern currents function as sedimentary ducts, along which there is an intensification of the particle transport processes between the coastal zone and the deep sea domain, making the transport of particulate matter (sediments) throughout the entire canyon very efficient. This underwater gorge causes major changes in the level of coastal sedimentary traffic, acting as a sink for sediments from the north, from coastal drift; this also explains the absence of large stretches of sand on the beaches south of Nazaré.

The importance and interest in the natural phenomenon led the Portuguese Hydrographic Institute (IH), in collaboration with the Municipality of Nazaré, to install an exhibition that illustrates the knowledge acquired from the research carried out in the area. The Nazaré Canyon Interpretive Center, installed in one of the fort's rooms, houses informational posters, a three-dimensional model of the underwater valley and images and information about the German submarine U-963, which sank in Nazaré's waters at the end of World War II.

== Surfing ==
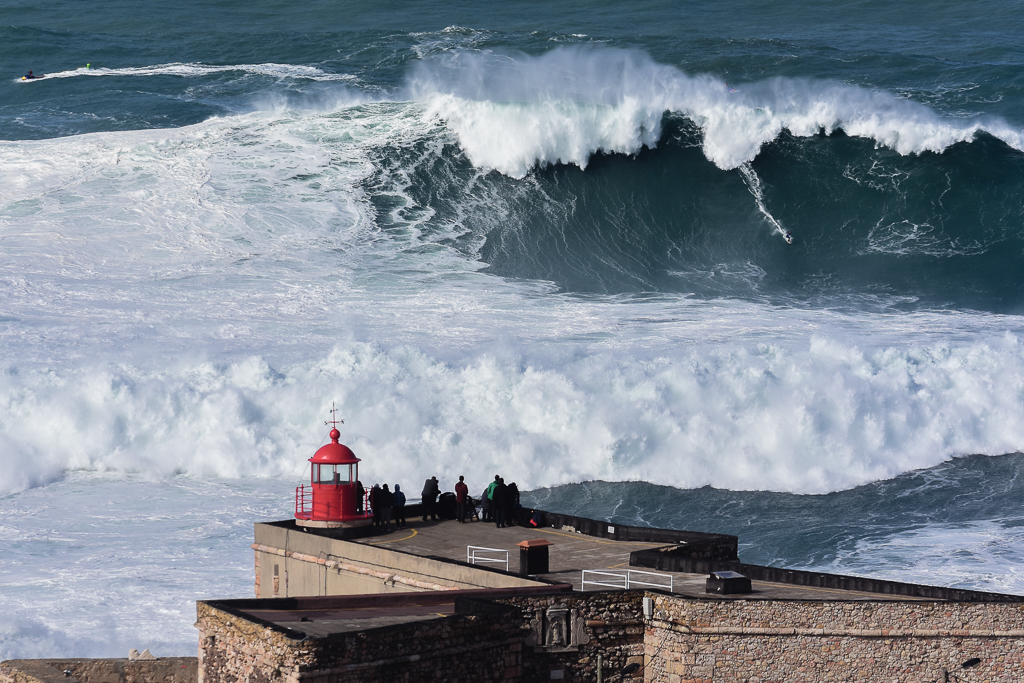
Praia do Norte, Nazaré (North Beach) was listed on the Guinness World Records for the biggest waves ever surfed (formed under the influence of the Nazaré Canyon).

One of the most distinct features of this canyon is the high breaking waves it forms. This makes Nazaré, specifically Praia do Norte, a hotspot for big wave surfing.

In November 2011, Hawaiian surfer Garrett McNamara surfed a record breaking giant wave of 24 metres (79 ft) from trough to crest at World Surf League in Nazaré. In January 2013, it was reported he successfully rode a wave measuring an estimated 30 metres (98 ft) at the same location, possibly exceeding the size of his previous record-breaking wave.

In January 2018, Hugo Vau might have smashed a world record amid claims he surfed one of the biggest waves ever seen at Nazaré. The wave — nicknamed ‘Big Mama’ — was reported to be up to 35 metres high, which, if it had been confirmed, would have beaten then-current Guinness Book of Records holder Garrett McNamara.

In 2017, Brazilian surfer Rodrigo Koxa set a new Guinness-recognized world record for the world's biggest wave ever to have been surfed, with his run at Nazare. In May 2018, the World Surf League confirmed this achievement at its Big Wave Awards in Santa Monica, California, with the official height of the wave registered at 24.38 m (80.0 ft).

In 2020, Sebastian Steudtner set a new record at Nazaré, riding a 26.2 metres (86 ft) wave. This record was accepted by Guinness and the World Surf League, and remains the world record as of 2026.

On February 11, 2020, at Nazaré, Maya Gabeira broke the record for the biggest wave ever surfed by a woman on a record-setting wave measuring 73.5 feet (22.4 meters), besting her own previous world record of 68 feet. The 73.5-foot wave she surfed on February 11 in Nazaré was the largest wave surfed by anyone that year, earning Gabeira the WSL's 2020 women's XXL Biggest Wave Award. By contrast, that year's men's XXL Biggest Wave Award winner, Kai Lenny, rode a 70-foot wave.

== See also ==
- Nazaré, Portugal
- Praia do Norte (Nazaré)
