= Mike Castillo =

California surfer and pilot

Mike Castillo is a veteran Baja pilot, well known in the surfing industry. He is credited for spotting the world-famous surf break, Cortes Bank, by air in 1990 while flying over the coast of Southern California with photographer Larry "Flame" Moore.

He is mentioned in the book Ghost Wave, a book by Chris Dixon, as a "gonzo surfer and bush pilot" that flew his Cessna alongside a giant, "mutant" wave as photographer Flame took pictures of the now famously dangerous surf break Cortes Bank.

He was mechanic and pilot for an amphibious aircraft, the Grumman Albatross, for Billabong, which he piloted for the Great Pacific Garbage Patch Project for GreenLandOceanBlue.

He was the engineer and pilot for the 2010 Sylvester Stallone film The Expendables.

He specializes in vintage, amphibious aircraft recovery, repair, and restoration.

Flew 1944 Consolidated PBY 5A with Bob Franicola from Johannesburg, South Africa to San Diego, California December 2012.

Co-founder Seaplanes Panama, 2015. First commercial seaplane service in Central America in over 55 years.
