= Mike Parsons (surfer) =

American professional surfer and surfing coach

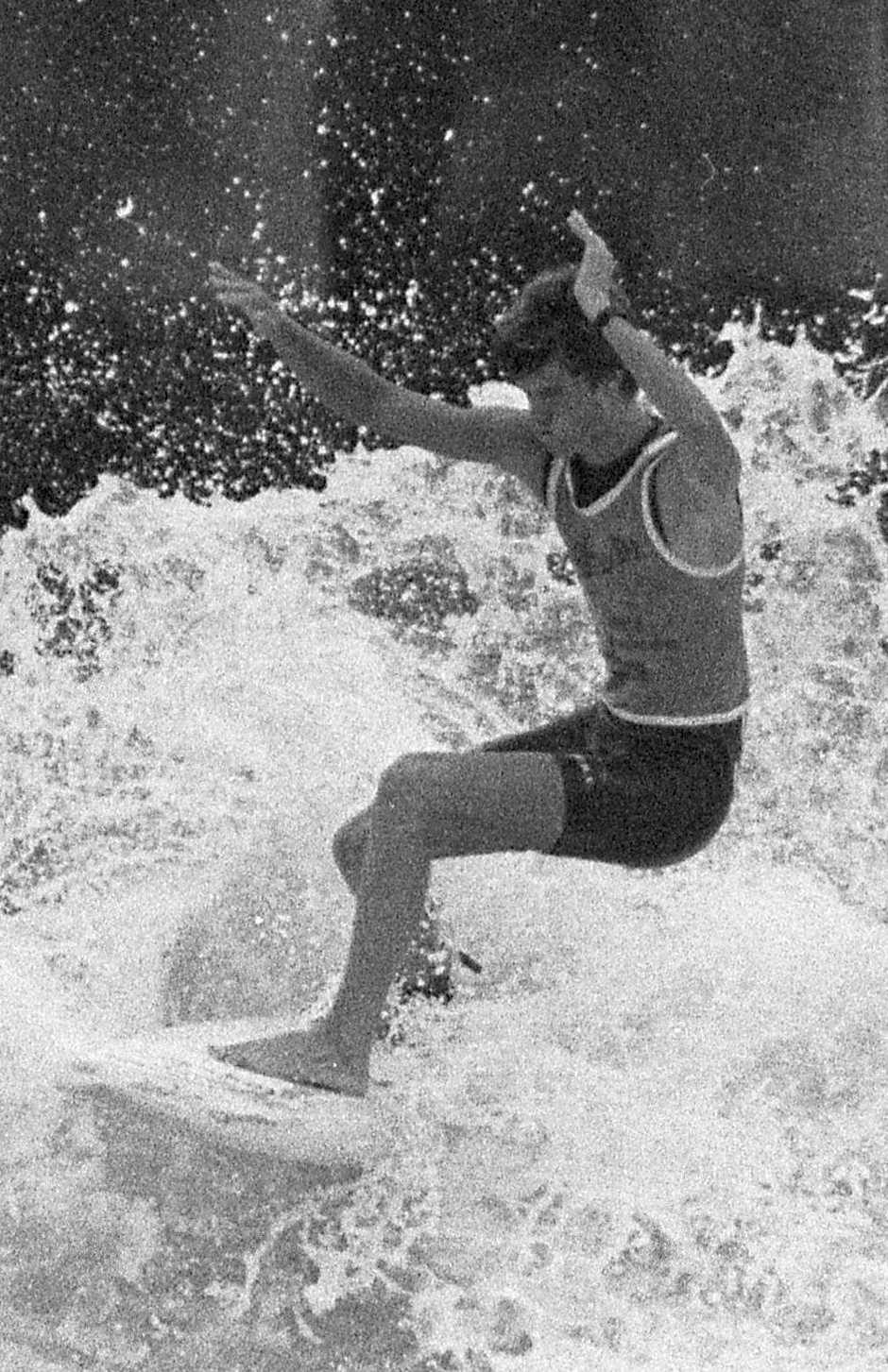
Parsons at the 1984 World Surfing Championship in Huntington Beach, California

Mike Parsons (born March 13, 1965, in California) is an American professional surfer and surfing coach.

== Early life ==
Parsons was raised in Laguna Beach, California and began surfing when he was six-years-old. In 1983, he earned second place in the Junior Division of the United States Surfing Championships.

== Career ==
In 2001, Parsons was towed into a 66-foot wave at Cortes Bank, CA, for which he was awarded $66,000 the highest prize ever awarded in the history of professional surfing. This money was awarded by the Billabong XXL competition which paid tribute to the biggest waves ridden each year. Parsons also surfed a 64-foot wave during competition at the Jaws break on the north shore of Maui. It was filmed by helicopter and used as the opening scene of the 2003 film Billabong Odyssey. A usually uncredited clip of this sequence has gone on to become a viral video.

Parsons later broke his record on January 5, 2008, at Cortes Bank, when he was photographed surfing a wave that the Billabong XXL judged to be 77 feet, which put him in the Guinness Book of World Records, officially, for biggest wave ever surfed. Nearly 4 years later Garrett McNamara improved on this record with a 78-foot wave off Nazaré, Portugal on November 1, 2011.

In 2011, Parsons became the full-time coach for surfer Kolohe Andino.

On January 20, 2013, Parsons suffered a broken C7 vertebra in his neck and nearly drowned while surfing triple-overhead surf at Ocean Beach, a beach break in San Francisco, California. Parsons was able to return to surfing four months later.

== Honors ==
Parsons was inducted into the Surfer's Hall of Fame in Huntington Beach, California in 2008.

== Filmography ==
- Shock Waves (1987)
- Overdrive (1993)
- 100-Foot Wednesday (1998)
- Step Into Liquid (2003)
