= Cortes Bank =

Shallow seamount in the North Pacific Ocean southwest of Los Angeles

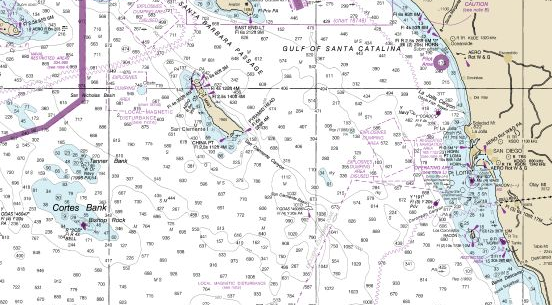
- Cortes Bank near San Diego

Location
- Coordinates: 32°28′41″N 119°12′54″W

Cortes Bank, historically charted as San Juan Island, is a shallow seamount (a barely submerged island) in the North Pacific Ocean off California. It is 96 miles (83 nmi; 154 km) southwest of San Pedro in Los Angeles, 111 miles (96 nmi; 179 km) west of Point Loma in San Diego, and 47 miles (41 nmi; 76 km) southwest of San Clemente Island in Los Angeles County. It is considered the outermost feature in California's Channel Islands chain. At various times during geologic history, the bank has been an island, depending on sea level rise and fall. The last time it was a substantial island was around 10,000 years ago during the last ice age. It is possible that this island was visited by the first human inhabitants of the Channel Islands, most notably San Clemente Island, whose seafaring residents would have been able to see the island from high elevations on clear days.

The shallower reaches of the bank comprise about 15 to 18 miles (24 to 29 km) of sandstone and basalt, and they rise from the ocean floor from a depth of 1,000 fathoms (6,000 ft; 1,829 m), or just over 1 mile (1.6 km). The bank has been described as a series of mountaintops, but really it is more of the shape of a wave-scoured mesa with a few hard, basaltic high spots along its length. The shallowest peak, the Bishop Rock, rises to between 3 and 6 feet (0.9 and 1.8 m) from the surface, depending on the tides. On very low tides, the rock can be visible in the trough of passing waves. Other shoal spots besides the Bishop Rock also spawn giant waves. These shoals range in depth from 30 to 100 feet (9.1 to 30.5 m) and are a hazard to shipping. Nine Fathom spot is about 4.5 miles (3.9 nmi; 7.2 km) northwest of Bishop Rock and also rises to about 54 feet (16 m) below the surface. Both are noted scuba diving locations featuring clear water, vast kelp forests, and abundant sea life. Bishop Rock also creates a renowned big-wave surfing spot recognized as capable of producing some of the tallest surfable waves in the world.

== General ==
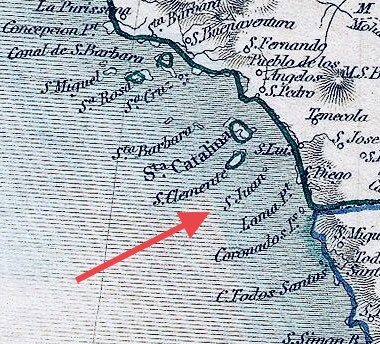
1851 map by John Tallis showing Cortes Bank as San Juan Island.

Historically, the Cortes Bank was charted as San Juan Island.

US Navy Lt. James Alden and Captain Jonathan "Mad Jack" Percival reported the seamount on January 5, 1846. At that time, the frigate USS Constitution was passing well off the California Coast from Monterey to see duty in the Mexican American War. The logbook of the Constitution from this day puts the ship in the vicinity of the bank and reads: "At 4-20 (p.m.) discovered breakers bearing N.E. about 10 miles distant." As late as 1851 rock in the same vicinity was still charted as San Juan Island (see the Tallis map).

In 1853, during a voyage from Panama to San Francisco, the captain of the side-wheel steamship Cortes, TP Cropper, reported seeing the seas "in violent commotion" above a low-lying island. The seamount would later be named for the ship. Cropper at first thought he was above a volcano.

James Alden of the Constitution would eventually become an officer with the United States Coast Survey, a United States Government organization charged with mapping the U.S. coastline. Following the sighting of the rock by the Cortes, and because of his own earlier sighting, Alden dispatched the crew of the USS Ewing to verify the source of the open ocean breakers precisely, which Lt. TH Stevens charted in precise coordinates, for years spelled "Cortez Bank." Stevens discovered waters around 54 feet deep, although he failed to discover the dangerously shallow area around the Bishop Rock, and it does not show up on the first Coast Survey map published in 1853.

Bishop Rock is today marked by a nearby warning buoy. It was named for the clipper ship Stillwell S. Bishop that reportedly struck the rock in 1855, then continued to San Francisco with a patched hull. There is some uncertainty over whether the Bishop actually struck the rock, though the captain of the ship, William Shankland, surely at least encountered waves along its periphery, likely in 1854. In the wake of the Bishop's voyage, James Alden placed a talented navigator and inveterate explorer from Wilmington, NC named Lt. Archibald MacRae, USN in command of the Ewing and dispatched him to discover the Bank's shallowest reach. On November 3, 1855, The New York Times carried the story "Dangerous Rock off the Coast of California," which reported MacRae's finding and the fact that he and the crew of the ship had anchored a pair of casks bearing a flag to mark the spot. Two weeks after the story appeared, MacRae committed suicide aboard the Ewing in San Francisco Bay, shooting himself in the head with a large caliber Colt revolver, while anchored alongside Alden's ship, the USS Active.

Among other notable events in the history of the Cortes Bank is the fairly disastrous exploration of the Bank for treasure in 1957 by Mel Fisher. He was convinced that the wreckage of a Spanish galleon lay on the seafloor off the Bishop Rock. The expedition found no treasure, but the ship carrying Fisher burned nearly to her waterline.

On 2 November 1985 the aircraft carrier USS Enterprise (CVN-65) struck the Cortes Bank reef about one mile east of Bishop Rock, putting a 60-foot (18 m) gash in her outer hull on the port side, ripped off her port keel, and severely deformed her outboard port propeller blades. She continued operations, then went into dry dock in San Francisco at the Hunter's Point Naval Shipyard for repairs.

== Micronation attempts ==
There have been at least two efforts to turn the Cortes Bank into a micronation. The most notable occurred in late 1966, when a team of entrepreneurs planned to turn the Cortes Bank into the constitutional monarchy of Abalonia. The general plan was to scuttle a WWII era concrete hulled freighter—probably the Tampa-built McClosky ship Richard Lewis Humphrey, which was later badged Jalisco in Mexico—atop the Bishop Rock in very shallow water and surround the ship with an ever-expanding ring of boulders so she could be used as a seafood processing factory. The group reasoned that international maritime law would allow them to become the rulers of their own nation because the Bank lay in international waters. The ship was instead destroyed atop the Bishop Rock by the same giant waves that are surfed today and her crew was nearly killed. The wreck of the Jalisco today lies beneath the surf zone in three pieces in 6 to 40 feet (2–12 m) of water, and is a diving location.

When another company planned to form a nation called Taluga, the US government declared that the bank, as part of the continental shelf, was US territory.

== Surfing ==
In the summer of 1961, surfer Harrison Ealy of Oceanside, California became one of the first people to surf a wave at the Bishop Rock. In around 1973, surfer Ilima Kalama, father of big wave surfer Dave Kalama, nearly died when the abalone fishing boat he was aboard sank on the Bishop Rock in the middle of the night.

In the early 1990s Larry Moore, photo editor at Surfing magazine, and Mike Castillo, veteran surfer and pilot, made flights out across the bank on rumors of giant waves. During a monster swell in 1990 that has been dubbed "The Eddie Aikau Swell," they were astonished when they found empty waves breaking atop the bank in the 80 to 90 foot range. By 1995 Moore had seen and photographed waves and that year he led an expedition with a small group of surfers out there (including Surfing magazine editors Sam George and Bill Sharp) and pro surfer George Hulse. The team found relatively small but very glassy waves in the fifteen foot range, and George Hulse was the first to catch one. "It was the only time I wrote out a will before a surf trip," Sharp said of the mission.

Several surfers planned for the ideal conditions at the bank. In 2001 a storm called "Storm 15" in the Gulf of Alaska and a high pressure ridge over California came together to create huge swells but light wind over the bank. A team of surfers went out on the F/V Pacific Quest from San Diego, with big-wave tow surfers Ken Collins, Peter Mel, Brad Gerlach and Mike Parsons, plus paddle-surfers Evan Slater and John Walla. On the morning of 19 January 2001 they found smooth glassy conditions and enormous, half-mile long waves breaking across about 1 mile (1.5 kilometer) of reef. Walla and Slater tried to paddle for one of these waves and both nearly drowned.

Larry Moore photographed from a circling plane, Dana Brown shot from a boat for his surf film Step Into Liquid, and Fran Battaglia shot from two other boats for his wave science film Making The Call: Big Waves of the North Pacific, his documentary for Swell, XXL, NBC Dateline, Billabong Odyssey and Activision's Kelly Slater Pro Surfer video game. Parsons was towed into the wave of the day. His first ride at the Cortes Bank was estimated at 66 feet (20 m) on the face. It won him the first of two Guinness World Records and the Swell XXL Biggest Wave Award (now Billabong XXL) prize of $66,000 for the biggest wave surfed in 2000/2001.

On January 5, 2008, Mike Parsons, Brad Gerlach, Grant "Twiggy" Baker and Greg Long returned to the location in the midst of one of the worst storms ever recorded off the coast of California. Mike Parsons was photographed on a wave bigger than his award-winning ride of 2001, judged by the Billabong XXL judges as 70+ feet on the face—later determined to be at least 77 feet—and Parsons second Guinness World Record. He was photographed 15 seconds into the ride, suggesting a wave of over 80 feet at the start. All witnesses agree that Greg Long rode a bigger wave, between 80 and 90 feet, that was not captured by photo or video. Very dangerous conditions made it difficult to photograph.

== See also ==
- List of Channel Islands
- Surf films featuring Cortes Bank:
  - Step Into Liquid
  - Point Break (2015 film)
  - 100 Foot Wave
