= Valado dos Frades =

- Civil parish
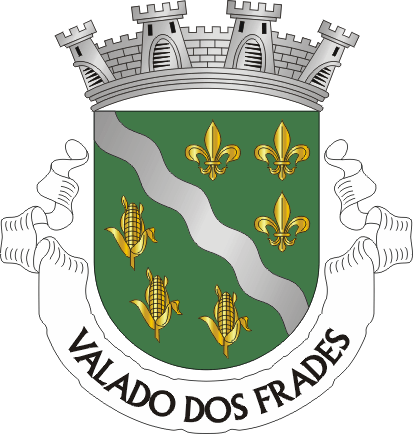
- Coat of arms

- Location in Portugal
- Coordinates: 39.589°N 9.019°W
- Country: Portugal
- Region: Oeste e Vale do Tejo
- Intermunic. comm.: Oeste
- District: Leiria
- Municipality: Nazaré

Area
  - Total: 18.51 km^{2} (7.15 sq mi)

Population (2011)
  - Total: 3,109
  - Density: 168.0/km^{2} (435.0/sq mi)
- Time zone: UTC+00:00 (WET)
  - Summer (DST): UTC+01:00 (WEST)

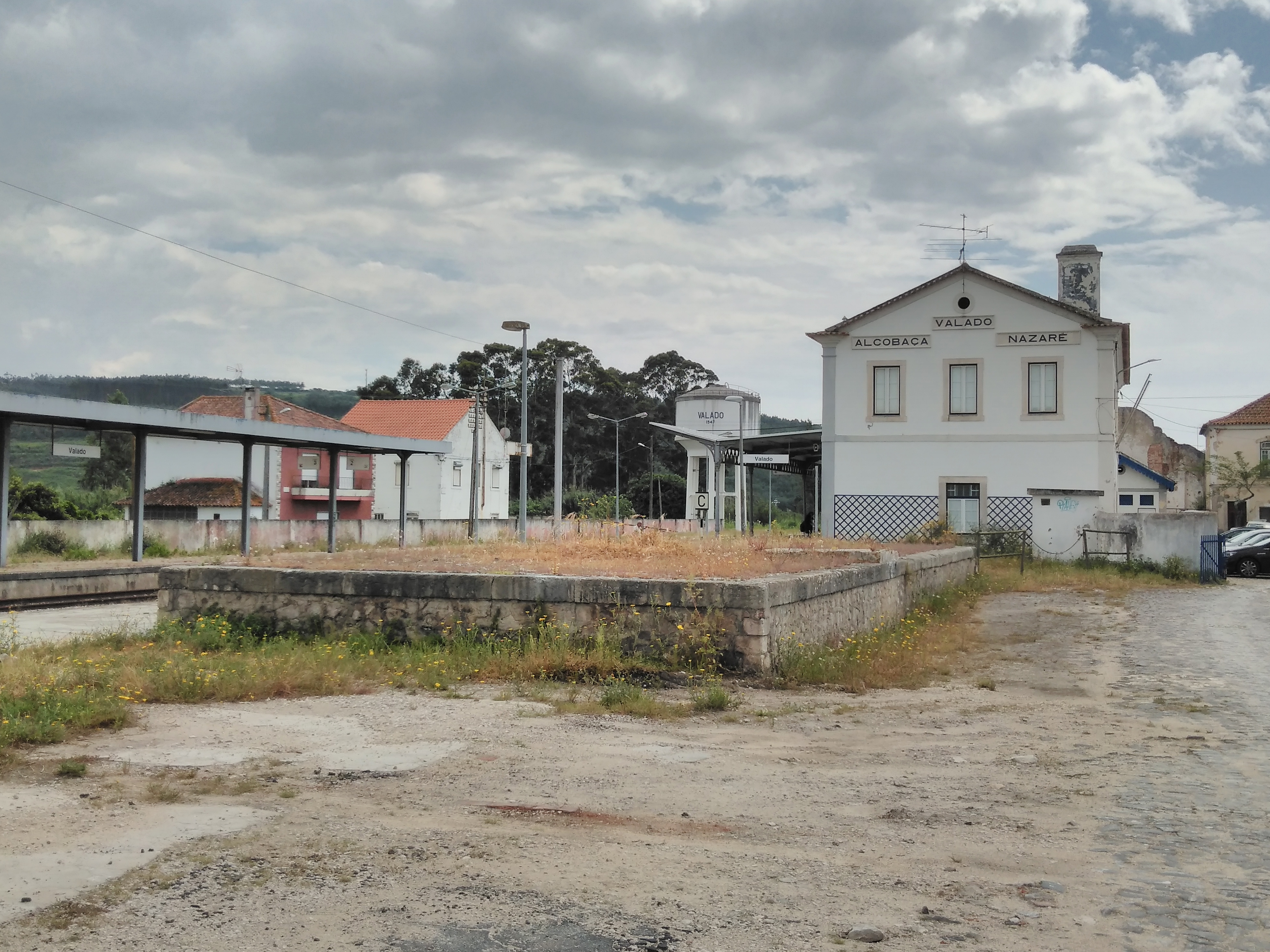
Train station in Valado, photographed in 2018

Valado dos Frades is a Portuguese parish in the municipality of Nazaré. The population in 2011 was 3,109, in an area of 18.51 km².
