= Fort of São Miguel Arcanjo =

16th-century fort and current museum in western Portugal

- Forte de São Miguel Arcanjo
- Oeste region Near Nazaré in Portugal
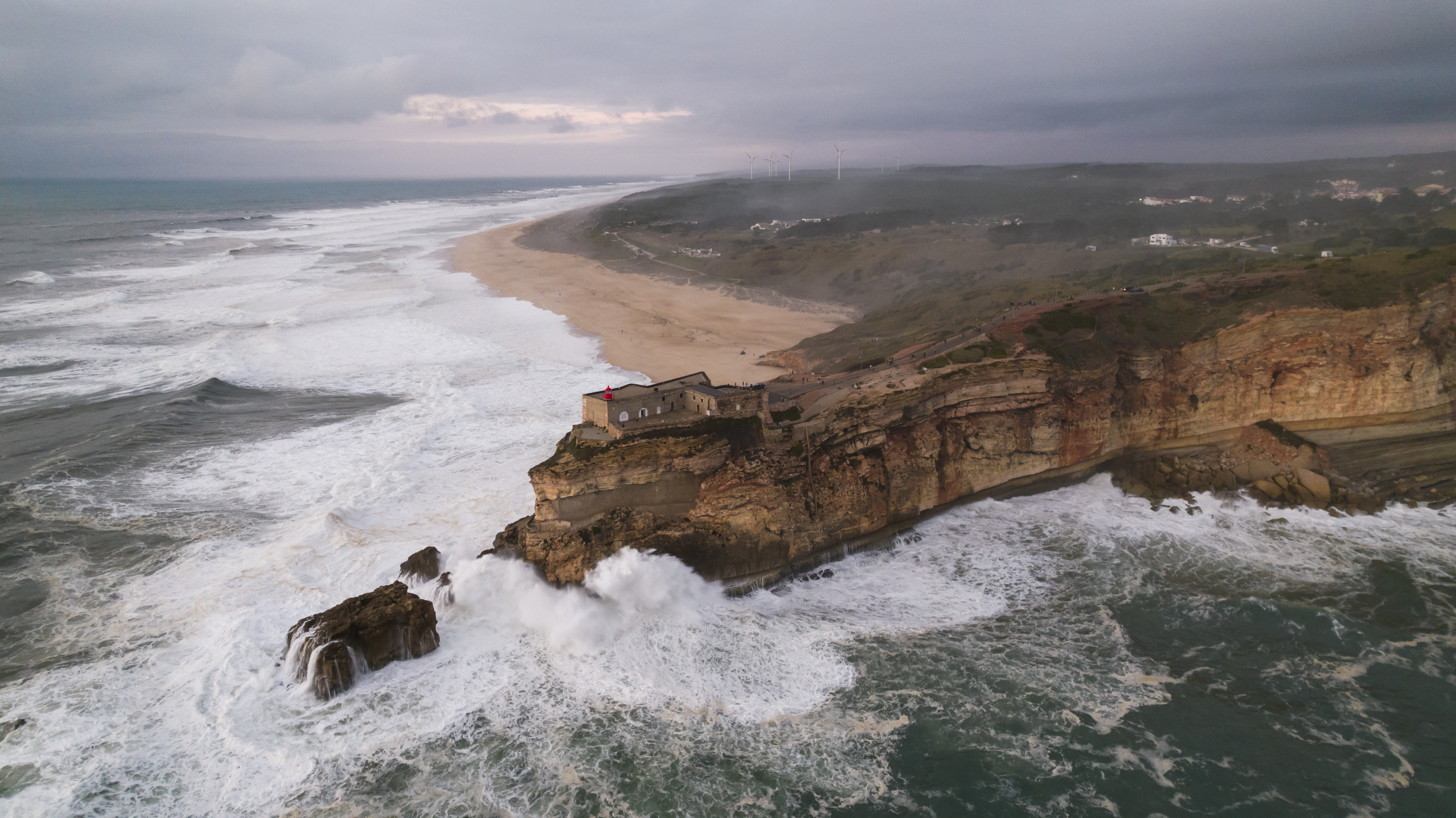
- View of the fort from the south

Site information
- Type: Bastion fort
- Owner: Portuguese Ministry of National Defence
- Open to the public: yes
- Condition: Good

Location
- Coordinates: 39°36′16″N 9°05′07″W

Site history
- Battles/wars: French invasion of Portugal, 1807; Portuguese Civil War, 1833-34

The Fort of São Miguel Arcanjo (St. Michael the Archangel) is situated in Nazaré, Oeste region of Portugal. It was first constructed in 1577 but has undergone remodeling and expansion on several occasions since then. The fort is a popular tourist site, particularly because of its proximity to a surfing area famous for the height of its waves. It now functions as both a lighthouse and a museum, which is devoted in part to surfing.

== History ==
The Fort of São Miguel Arcanjo is built on cliffs, surrounded by the sea to the north, west and south. A primitive fort was initially constructed in 1577 under the orders of King Sebastian I of Portugal, with the intention of defending the fishing, shipbuilding and wood trading activities of Nazaré from attacks by Algerian, Moroccan, Dutch and Norman pirates. By 1595 it was equipped with four pieces of artillery. Further work was carried out between 1639 and 1641, when the number of artillery pieces was increased to six. The fort was again upgraded in 1644, under the instructions of King John IV, at which time it acquired its current shape and was given its name. It has an irregular plan, which was necessary to adapt it to the outline of the promontory on which it is built. On the portal above the entrance, King John ordered a limestone image of St. Michael the Archangel to be placed, with the caption "EL REY DOM JUAN-1644".

During the French invasion of Portugal it was occupied in 1807 or 1808 by a detachment of 50 men, after its artillery pieces had been removed to the Citadel of Cascais to provide protection for Lisbon. The French were imprisoned by the local inhabitants after a group of students succeeded in persuading the invaders to surrender, convincing them that the Portuguese had received reinforcements. At the same time people from Nazaré travelled south by boat to Cascais in search of armaments, which enabled them to repel the French reinforcements that were heading from Peniche to the north, to aid the French garrison. The fort became a landmark of popular revolt but, later, the French invaders returned to the area, killing inhabitants and burning houses and boats in reprisal.

In 1831 the fort housed a military detachment, supported by two 12-gauge pieces, but these were transferred to Peniche in 1833. The fort was the site of skirmishes in the Liberal Wars, or Portuguese Civil War, involving fights between supporters of the two royal brothers, King Pedro IV and King Miguel I. After the departure of D. Miguel I to exile, in July 1834, the stone image of St. Michael the Archangel at the fort was attacked by the supporters of Pedro and thrown down the walls to the beach. Although subsequently restored to its original position, it remains unrepaired. After this the fort became privately owned until it was expropriated by the state in 1902.

== Lighthouse ==
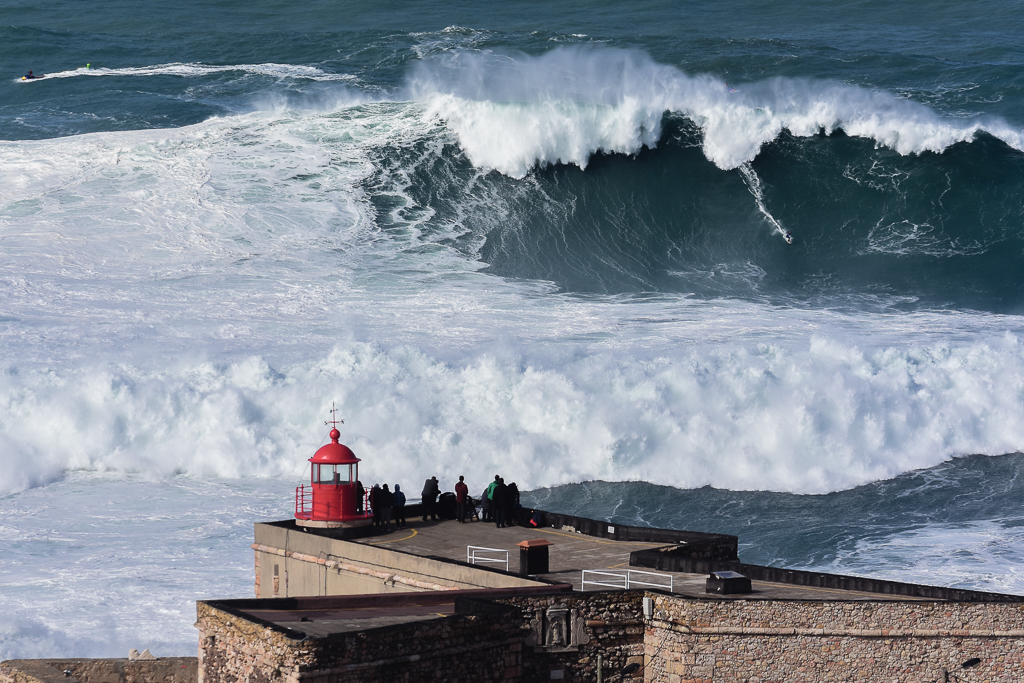
View of fort, lighthouse and waves

In 1903 a lighthouse and a house for the lighthouse keeper were constructed, primarily to assist local fishermen. The lighthouse began operations on December 1, 1903. It now consists of a lantern painted red with a height of 8 metres (26 ft 3 in), having a white light and a range of 14 nautical miles (26 km; 16 mi), at a height of 50 metres (164 ft) above sea level. There is also a foghorn. In 1907 restoration of the walls took place and further work on the walls was begun in 1941. Work to conserve the main gate and waterproof the terrace was done in 1977. Drainage work was carried out in 2005–2006. Although currently well preserved, the structure is threatened with collapse due to the advanced erosion of the cliffs on the south side.

== Museum ==
The museum area of the fort has been open to the public since 2014. It contains an exhibition regarding the World War II German submarine U-963, which was scuttled off Nazaré on 20 May 1945. There is also an Interpretation Centre, which describes the impact of the Nazaré Canyon just off the coast of Nazaré, which is believed to be the largest canyon in Europe, having a maximum depth of at least 5,000 metres (16,400 ft), and is the cause of the high breaking waves that make Nazaré a popular surfing destination.
