= Pederneira =

Area of Nazaré, Portugal

Coordinates: 39.606°N 9.071°W

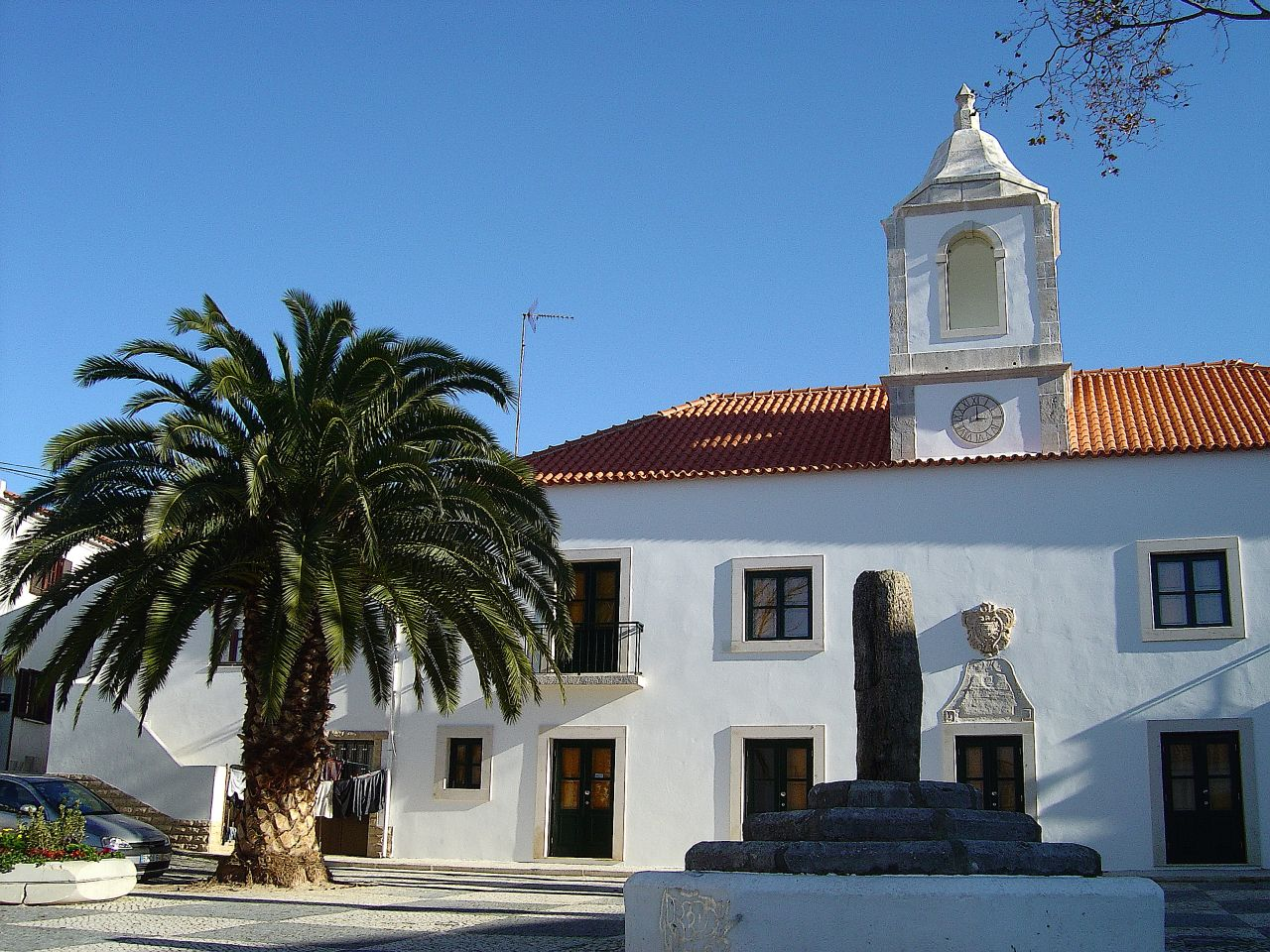
Pederneira - Nazaré

Pederneira is a former village in Portugal, and currently part of the larger city of Nazaré, Portugal on the coast of the Atlantic Ocean.

== About ==
Pederneira was also known as Seno Petronero, meaning Gulf of Pederneira in the Middle Ages. Situated near the mouth of the Alcoa River, on a rocky headland on the northern end of the Pederneira Bay, the town dates from the time of Dom Manuel (1469–1521), when a seaside village with 600 houses named Paredes was swallowed by sand.

The local industry was fishing and the area has some of the best fisheries in Portugal, but the locals' livelihood was severely threatened by piracy, which is why the fishermen chose to live away from the beach, in Pederneira, whose location offered it protection from pirates who were active until the nineteenth century. A small battery was built at the sea end of the headland above a sheer cliff. At the highest point of the headland is the church of Nossa Senhora da Nazaré.

It was attacked by a French army in 1808, who destroyed the majority of the inhabitants' houses, only four out of some 300 being left standing. Boats and fishing gear were also burnt. By the 1850s it had recovered, and had at that time about 2,000 inhabitants.

== See also ==
- Nazaré (Portugal)
- Alcoa River
