= Nazaré Bullring =

Bullfighting arena in Nazaré, Portugal

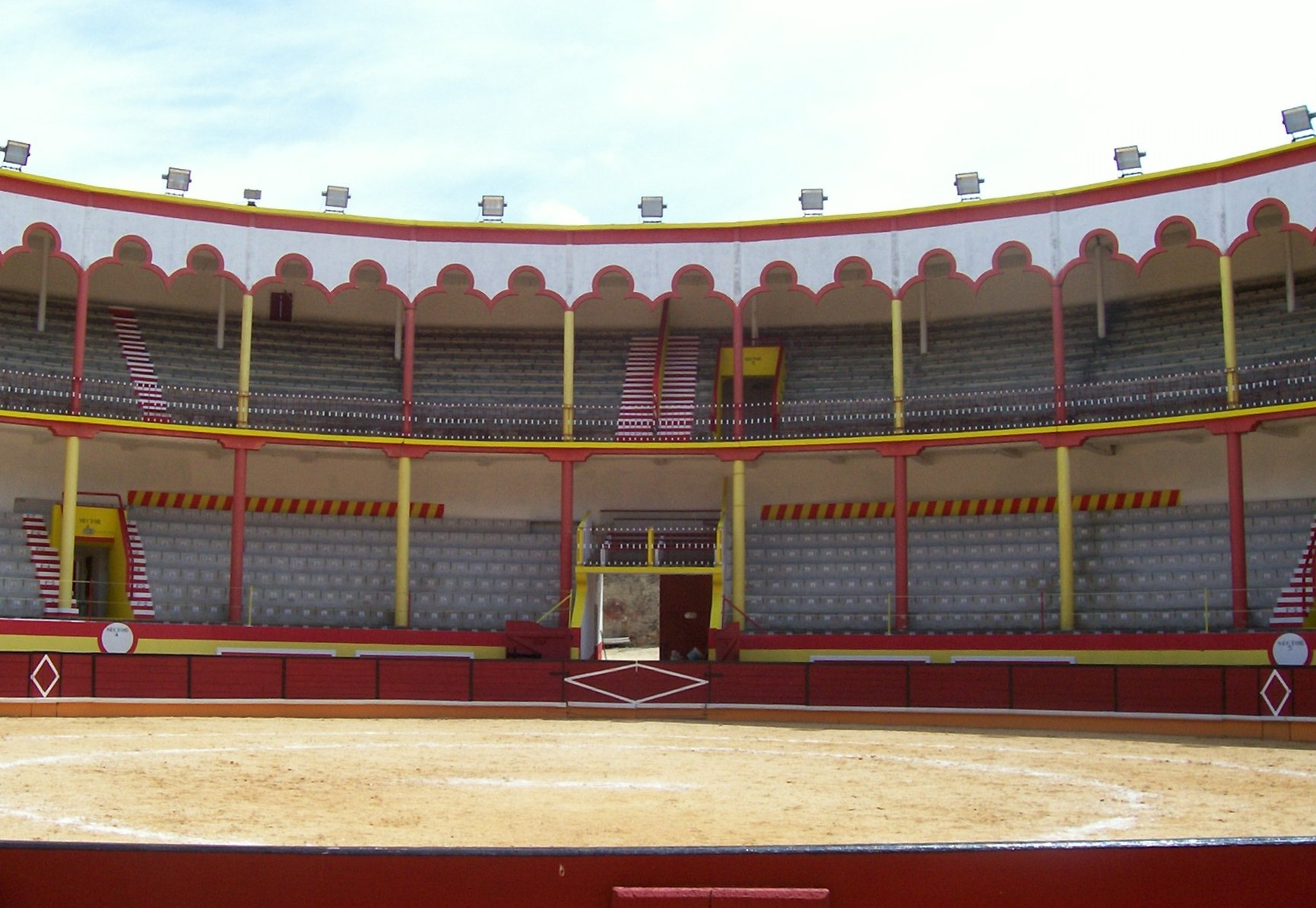
- The Bullring in Sitio, Nazaré
- Interactive map of the Nazaré Bullring area

General information
- Type: Bullring
- Location: Nazaré, Portugal
- Coordinates: 39°36′23″N 9°04′24″W
- Construction started: 1891
- Completed: 1897
- Opening: 1897; 129 years ago

The Nazaré bullring (Portuguese: Praça de Touros da Nazaré) is situated on the west coast of Portugal in the village of Sitio in Nazaré, historic Estremadura province. The present bullring was built in 1897 in neo-Arab style and continues to be used for bullfights and other entertainment. An earlier bullring was destroyed by fire.

== History ==
The tradition of bullfighting in Nazaré dates back to at least the eighteenth century and has always been associated with the celebrations of Our Lady of Nazareth (Portuguese: Nossa Senhora da Nazaré), of which bullfighting was one of the main attractions. In the 18th and 19th centuries several temporary arenas were constructed and were subsequently demolished or suffered fires. As a result of a fire in 1874 that completely destroyed the bullring the Ministry of Public Works commissioned the architect Francisco da Silva Castro to design a new space in 1891, and the new bullring was inaugurated in 1897. It has two levels of seating with the first being polygonal and the second circular. Seating is on benches with some boxes on the upper floor. The bullring uses a revivalist Neo-Arab style, especially in the exterior windows and the interior finish of the second floor.

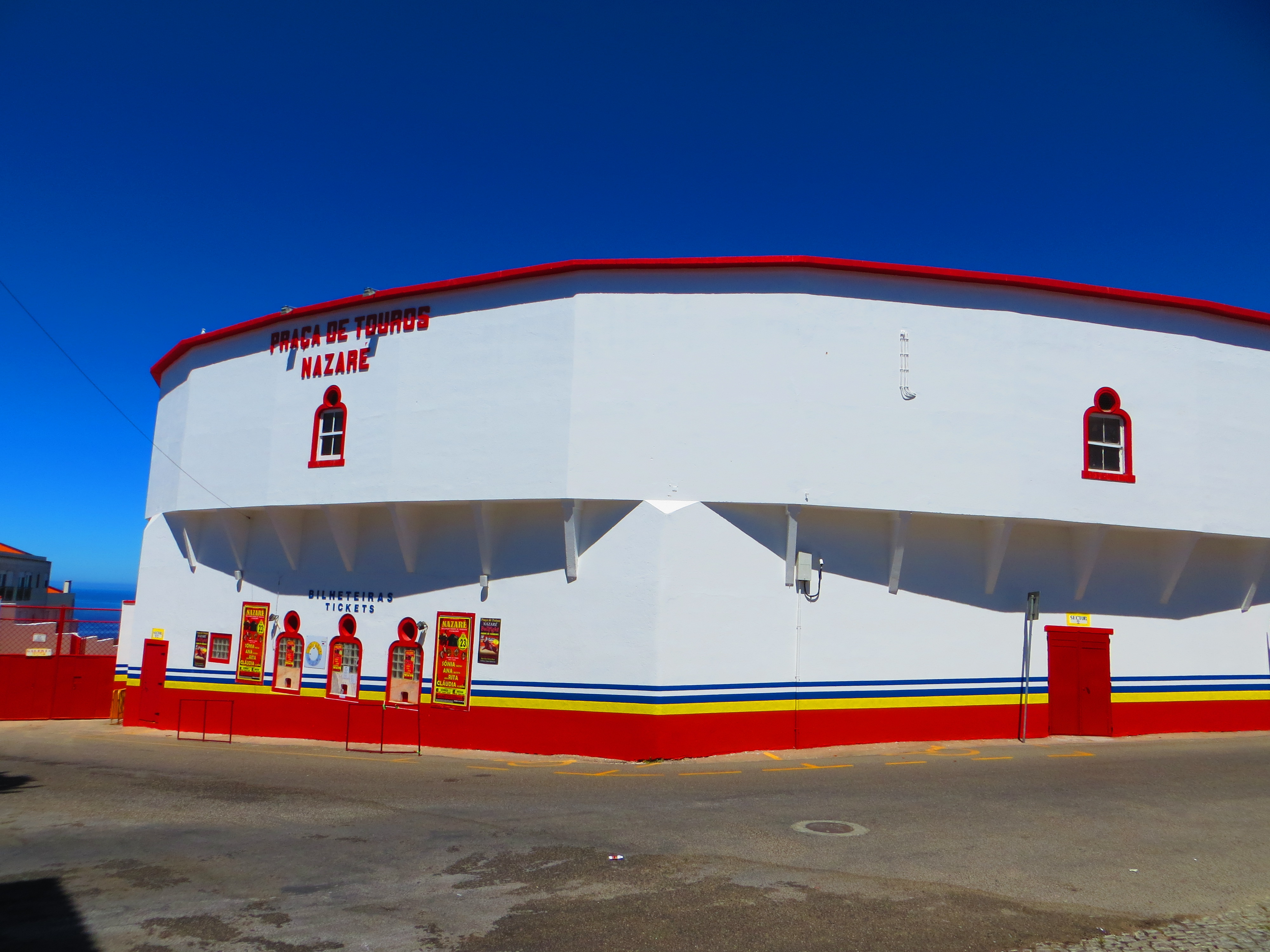
Exterior view of the Nazaré bullring
