= Garrett McNamara =

American Big Wave Surfer

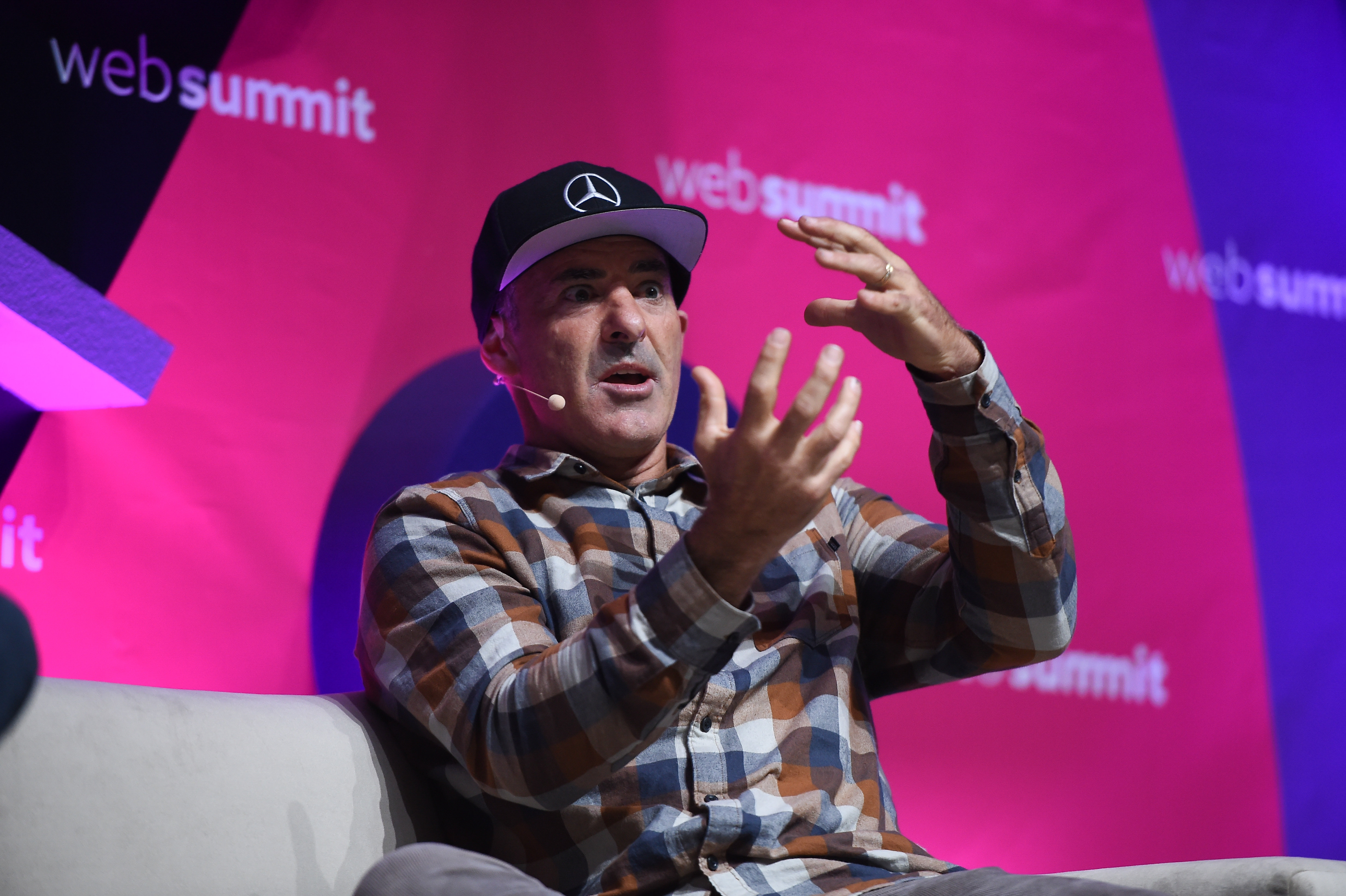
- McNamara at the Web Summit 2017 in the Altice Arena, Lisbon, Portugal.

Personal information
- Born: August 10, 1967 (age 59) Pittsfield, Massachusetts, U.S.
- Years active: 1978–present
- Height: 5 ft 10 in (1.78 m)
- Weight: 175 lb (79 kg)
- Website: garrettmcnamara.com

Surfing career
- Sport: Surfing
- Best year: 2013
- Sponsors: Red Nose, Mercedes-Benz Wavejet, Donjoy, Body Glove, Kona Red, Maui Jim, Raw Elements, and Noll Worldwide
- Major achievements: World record for largest wave ever surfed, first to surf tsunami from calving glaciers

Surfing specifications
- Stance: Regular
- Shapers: Dick Brewer, Greg Noll, YU, Rusty, Stretch, Carl Schaper
- Quiver: Big
- Favorite waves: Lani's and Sunset
- Favorite maneuvers: The tube

Garrett "GMAC" McNamara (born August 10, 1967) is an American professional big wave surfer best known for once holding the world record for largest wave ever surfed, as documented in the HBO series 100 Foot Wave. McNamara is also known for successfully negotiating a monstrous barrel at Jaws and being the first person to ride a wave formed from calving glaciers.

== Early life and education ==
McNamara was born on August 10, 1967, in Pittsfield, Massachusetts. McNamara has Irish ancestry. He spent much of his childhood in Berkeley, California.

During his early childhood, his mother took the family to Central America, where she was a victim of domestic abuse and occasionally abandoned him and his brother. At one point, a Guatemalan farmer sought to adopt him, but his mother returned and brought the family back to America. He then returned to Berkeley, where his mother left him with his birth father; McNamara lived with him for several years until his mother returned with a new domestic partner, who moved the family to the North Shore of Oahu, Hawai’i in 1978.

At 11 years old, McNamara followed his younger brother's footsteps and began surfing at Sunset, Waimea and the outer reefs in search of giant swells. He entered and placed in the prestigious Triple Crown of Surfing series at age 17 and began to gain sponsors. For the next 10 years, both brothers joined the competition circuit. For several years, his younger brother Liam was more well known in the surfing community.

Tow surfing caught on among the surfing community in the early 2000s, and McNamara was one of the first to join the movement. Boats and personal water craft enabled surfers to chase down and catch giant waves that were thought to be beyond the bounds of surfers paddling with their bare hands.

== Career ==
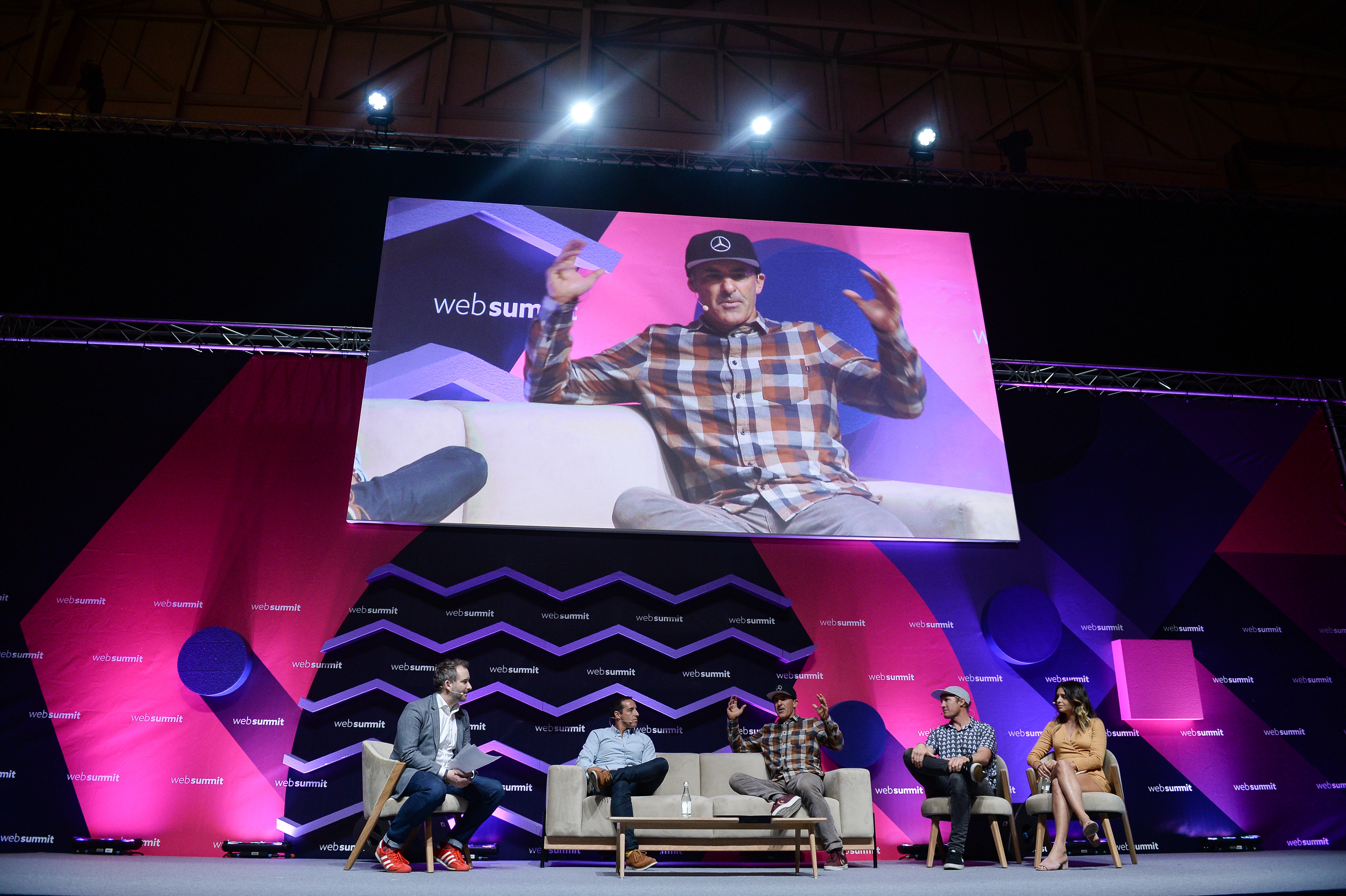
McNamara speaking at the Web Summit 2017, Lisbon, Portugal.

After training for a year, McNamara and tow-in partner Rodrigo Resende won the $70,000 purse at the Tow Surfing World Cup in Maui at Jaws in 2002. Later that year, he posed for the cover of major surf magazines around the world after being photographed in a dramatic barrel shot off of the coast of Teahupo'o in Tahiti. In 2003 he rode one of his most well known waves. McNamara was once again at Jaws and caught a wave with a 20-foot (6.1 m) barrel where onlookers believed he had been crushed by the lip of the wave. He emerged to the surprise and amazement of everyone watching, including himself.

The boundaries of big-wave surfing were pushed once again in the summer of 2007 by McNamara and partner Keali’i Mamala, seeking tsunami formed by 300-foot (91 m) calving glaciers in South-Central Alaska. A feature film was made documenting their experience.

In January 2016, McNamara suffered a severe wipeout on a 50-foot wave at Mavericks in California that caused him to skip off the water three times before being swallowed by the monster-size wave. Rescuers on jet skis eventually pulled McNamara to safety, and he suffered a dislocated shoulder and a broken upper arm that required surgery. Video of McNamara's wipeout went viral, and local surfers have said it was one of the worst wipeouts caught on video.

=== World record ===
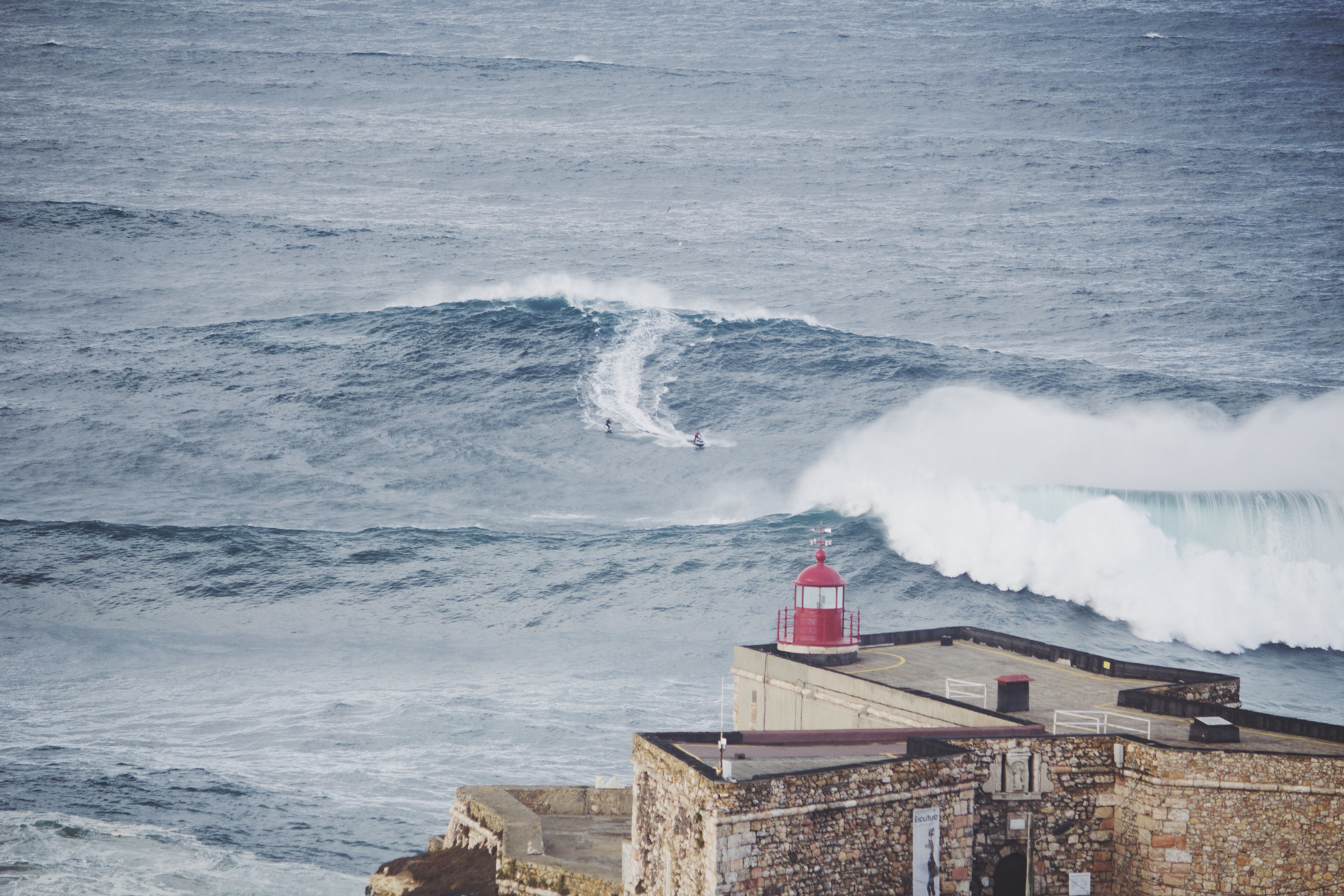
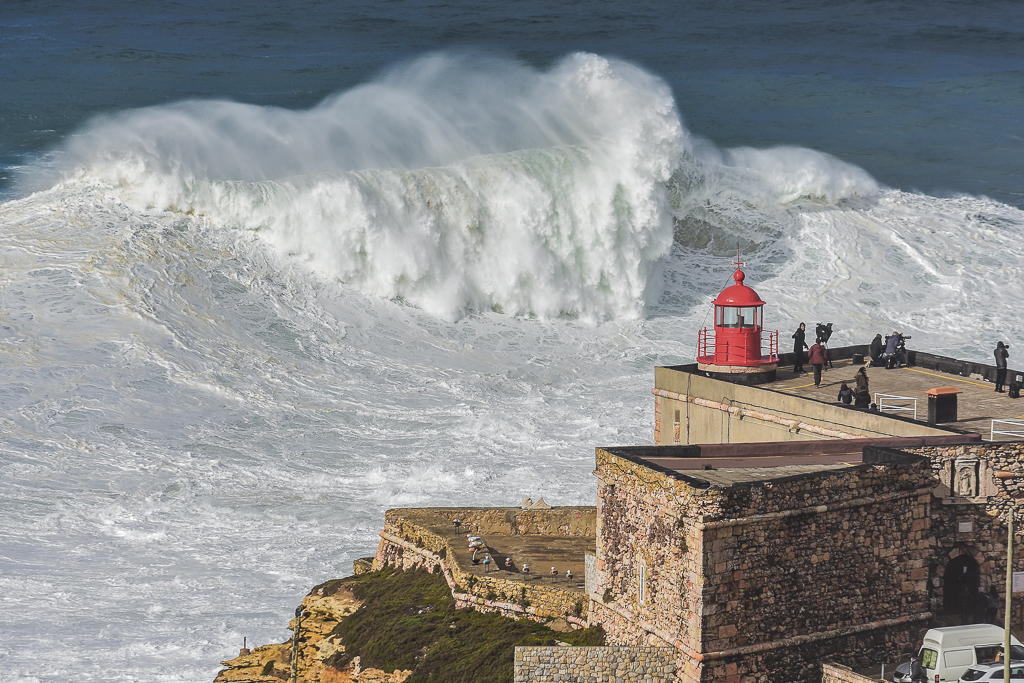

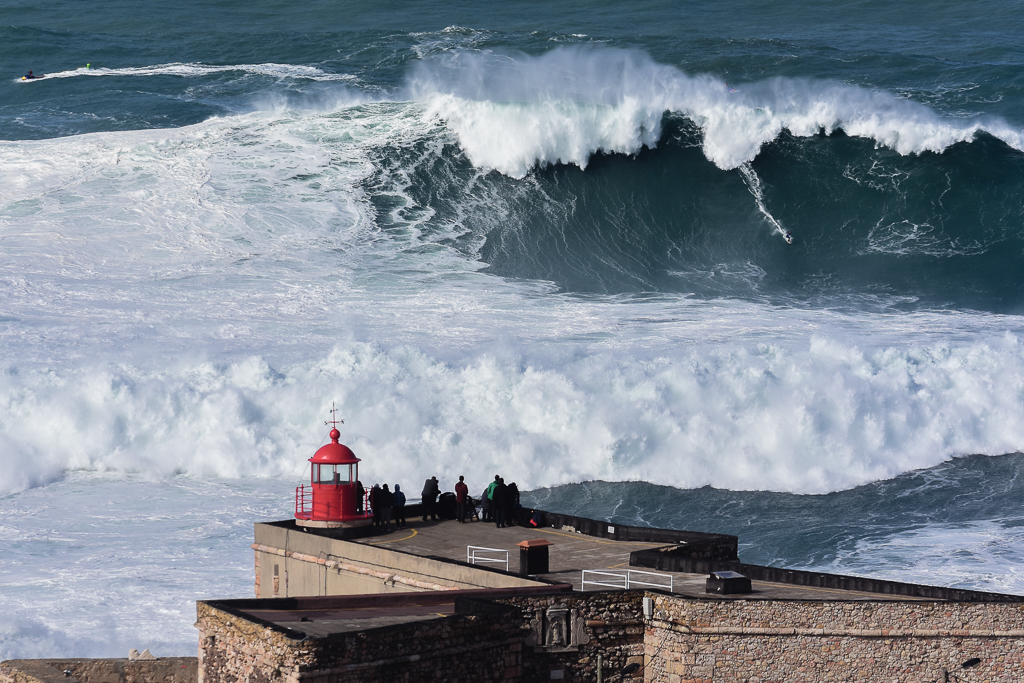
The Praia do Norte, Nazaré (North Beach) was listed on the Guinness World Records for McNamara big wave surfed (formed under the influence of the Nazaré Canyon).

In November 2011, McNamara caught a 78 foot (24 m) wave in Praia do Norte, Nazaré, Portugal, after being towed into the wave from a jet ski riding a 6’0 Dick Brewer Tow Board. His record, entered into the Guinness Book of World Records, beat the prior world record by over a foot. Before it was verified, the premature announcement (by others, not by McNamara) proved a source of controversy in the surf world. The record was subsequently broken by Sebastian Steudtner, in October, 2020, with an 86 foot (26 m) wave.

In January 2013, McNamara was said to have surfed an estimated 100-foot (30 m) wave. He also did this off the coast of Nazaré. If verified this would have broken his own record.

=== Beyond surfing ===
McNamara became interested in Stand Up Paddle (SUP) and gave it his own twist by designing and creating SUP boards for a more extreme experience, venturing into big wave venues like Waimea, Puerto Escondido, and Mavericks. In 1997, he was instrumental, along with Dawson Jones and Mike Takahashi, in establishing the Molokai to Oahu Paddleboard World Championships.

He was invited to compete in the World Stand Up Paddle Surfing Championship in June 2009 by the International Surfing Association, where only 32 elite surfers were invited to attend.

== Personal life ==
McNamara is married to Nicole McNamara (née Macias), an environmental sciences teacher. When they first met, both were married to other people. The couple wed at Praia do Norte, Nazaré, Portugal in November 2012. They have three children, Barrel (2015), Theia Love Nazaré Celeste Rose (2018) and Fe do Mar Strawberry Lucy (2021). He has three children from his previous marriage to Konnie Pascual McNamara: Ariana Kaimana McNamara (1995), Titus Waimea McNamara (1997) and Tiari McNamara.

== Awards and honors ==
- Portuguese Navy Medalha Naval de Vasco da Gama
- 2012 Entered into Guinness World Records for Largest Wave Ever Surfed of 78 feet - Nazaré, Portugal
- 2012 Billabong XXL Awards – Biggest Wave Award
- 2012 Billabong XXL Awards – Wipeout of the Year Award
- 2008 2nd Place Puerto Escondido, Mexico SUP Contest
- 2008 Billabong XXL Awards – Performance of the Year Award
- 2008 2nd Place Free Wave Challenge Tube of the Year
- 2007 Billabong XXL Awards – Performance of the Year
- 2007 Billabong XXL Awards – Biggest Wave Award
- 2006 1st Place Nell Scott Tow Surfing Championships
- 2006 Billabong XXL Awards – Golden Donut Award
- 2005 1st Place North Shore Tow Surfing Championships
- 2004 Surfer Poll – Best Tube Award
- 2003 1st Place Jaws World Cup Expression Session
- 2002 1st Place Jaws World Cup Tow in Surfing

== Filmography ==
The following is based on Internet Movie Database data:

=== Television ===
- Fuel TV - 12 episodes
- Travel Channel - 12 episodes
- Anderson Cooper 360° Segment
- Discovery Channel Segment
- The Swell Life OWN - 12 episodes
- 100 Foot Wave - 17 episodes

=== Films ===
- The Glacier Project
- The North Canyon Show by Garrett McNamara
- 100 Foot Wave

== See also ==
- Gabe Davies
- Richie Fitzgerald
- Laird Hamilton
- Dave Kalama
- Keala Kennelly
- Mark Mathews
