= Rodrigo Koxa =

Brazilian surfer

Personal information
- Nickname: Koxa
- Born: Rodrigo Augusto do Espírito Santo; September 22, 1979 (age 46) Jundiaí, São Paulo, Brazil
- Years active: 1988–present
- Height: 5 ft 8 in (1.73 m)
- Weight: 160 lb (73 kg)
- Website: rodrigokoxa.com.br

Surfing career
- Sport: Surfing
- Best year: 2018
- Major achievements: World record for largest wave ever surfed, in 2018. The biggest wave ever surfed in South America, in 2010.

Surfing specifications
- Stance: Regular

Rodrigo Augusto do Espírito Santo (born September 22, 1979), known as Rodrigo Koxa, is a Brazilian professional big wave surfer and extreme waterman who broke the world record for largest wave ever surfed at Nazaré, Portugal, on November 8, 2017.

== Biography ==
Rodrigo Koxa was born in Jundiaí, Brazil on September 22, 1979, and began his surfing career in 1988 on the beaches of Guarujá, Brazil.

On April 30, 2018, Koxa won the coveted Quiksilver XXL Biggest Wave prize, in the Big Wave Awards of World Surf League (WSL). His wave was recognised by judges of the Santa Monica, CA-based Big Wave Awards as the biggest wave ever surfed in history. He now holds the position in the Guinness World Records with the biggest wave ever surfed in the history of the World Surf League.

Koxa surfed the wave on November 8, 2017, in the village of Nazaré, Oeste region of Portugal. The feat was declared as the new world record, the wave's height having been about 80 feet (24.38 m), supplanting the previous record of an estimated 78 feet (23.77 m) set in 2011 by Koxa's mentor Garrett McNamara.

In August 2010, Koxa had reached a previous record. In Chile, he surfed the largest wave ever seen in South America, estimated at more than 60 feet (18.29 m) face, earning him the record of surfing the highest wave of South America.

== See also ==
- Nazaré, Portugal
- Praia do Norte (Nazaré)
