= 100 Foot Wave =

American surfing documentary series

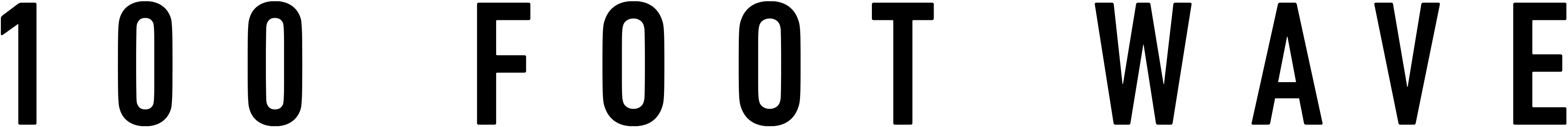
- Genre: Documentary
- Directed by: Chris Smith
- Country of origin: United States
- Original language: English
- No. of seasons: 3
- No. of episodes: 17

Production
- Executive producers: Chris Smith; Joe Lewis; Ryan Heller; Maria Zuckerman; Michael Bloom; Nancy Abraham; Lisa Heller; Bentley Weiner
- Editors: Connor Culhane; Adrienne Gits; Abhay Sofsky; Brandon Valentin
- Running time: 52-60 minutes
- Production companies: Topic Studios; Amplify Pictures; Library Films; React Films; Cinetic Media

Original release
- Network: HBO
- Release: July 18, 2021 – present

100 Foot Wave is an American documentary television series directed by Chris Smith, revolving around big-wave surfer Garrett McNamara as he traveled to Nazaré, Portugal with the goal of conquering a 100-foot wave. It premiered on HBO on July 18, 2021.

The third season premiered on May 1, 2025.

== Plot ==
McNamara's career as a big-wave surfer is chronicled. The series focuses on his time in Nazaré, where he hopes to find and conquer a 100-foot wave. He works alongside Nazaré locals to transform the town into a surfing destination known for its immense waves. Other big-wave surfers are also profiled.

== Episodes ==
Season	Episodes	Originally released	
Season	Episodes	First released	Last released
1	6	July 18, 2021	August 22, 2021
2	6	April 16, 2023	May 21, 2023
3	5	May 1, 2025	May 29, 2025

=== Season 1 (2021) ===
No. overall	No. in season	Title	Directed by	Original release date	U.S. viewers (millions)
1	1	"Chapter I: Sea Monsters"	Chris Smith	July 18, 2021	N/A
Professional big wave surfer Garrett McNamara begins "tow surfing," using jet skis to be able to get on taller and taller waves. After McNamara is filmed riding the barrel of a 20-foot wave at Hawaii's famous Jaws surf site, the video gets shared around the world and a resident of Nazaré Portugal reaches out to Garrett to try to get him interested in the mammoth waves that crash onto Nazaré's shore. McNamara goes to Nazaré and builds a team of like-minded surfers in hopes of catching the mythical 100-foot wave.
2	2	"Chapter II: We're Not Surfers"	Chris Smith	July 25, 2021	N/A
McNamara and his team return to Nazaré for another season of surfing. The team struggles through a number of accidents and challenges but eventually develop a set of safety procedures that enable them to surf Nazaré's wave with less chance of injury or death. The struggles pay off when McNamara catches a nearly 80 foot tall wave that catapults him to international fame and makes him the holder of the world record for largest wave surfed.
3	3	"Chapter III: Mavericks"	Chris Smith	August 1, 2021	N/A
After losing his drive to continue surfing at Nazaré, McNamara decides to return to competitive surfing at other big-wave sites. In order to compete in a tournament at California's Mavericks surf site, he must surf there regularly, something that he has done many times in the past. McNamara returns to Mavericks only to suffer a horrific injury on a wave he should have aced.
4	4	"Chapter IV: Dancing With God"	Chris Smith	August 8, 2021	N/A
McNamara recovers from the injuries he sustained at Mavericks and begins training to return to Nazaré for another season. While surfing at Indonesia's G-Land site, Garrett suffers more injuries that threaten to take him off the waves permanently. Meanwhile, a friend of Garretts catches an 80-foot wave at Nazaré, taking the world record from McNamara. McNamara resolves to continue his hunt for a 100-foot wave.
5	5	"Chapter V: The Circus"	Chris Smith	August 15, 2021	0.205
As dozens of top surfers from across the world arrive in Nazaré to train and prepare for a major big-wave competition, Garret continues to struggle with his physical injuries and mental preparedness. He knows he is not ready to surf in the competition but seeing the other surfers makes him consider competing anyway. Garrett also has misgivings about the state of safety plans at the competition, and tries to convince the organizers to beef up their plans.
6	6	"Chapter VI: More Than Just a Wipeout"	Chris Smith	August 22, 2021	0.197
The day of the Nazaré competition has arrived, and Garrett decides not to compete but instead support his long-time friend and teammate Andrew "Cotty" Cotton. The competition does not go smoothly, with a major accident that has secondary effects on Cotty. After the competition, Garrett tries surfing at Nazaré again and realizes that he can resume big-wave surfing. The episode concludes with retrospectives from a number of the surfers who appeared on various episodes throughout the season.

=== Season 2 (2023) ===
No. overall	No. in season	Title 20	Directed by	Original release date	U.S. viewers (millions)
7	1	"Chapter I: Epsilon"	Chris Smith	April 16, 2023	0.121
8	2	"Chapter II: The Circus is Burning"	Chris Smith	April 23, 2023	0.100
9	3	"Chapter III: Jaws"	Chris Smith	April 30, 2023	0.155
10	4	"Chapter IV: Partners"	Chris Smith	May 7, 2023	N/A
11	5	"Chapter V: Lost at Sea"	Chris Smith	May 14, 2023	0.083
12	6	"Chapter VI: Force Majeure"	Chris Smith	May 21, 2023	N/A

=== Season 3 (2025) ===
No. overall	No. in season	Title	Directed by	Original release date	U.S. viewers (millions)
13	1	"Chapter I: Risk"	Chris Smith	May 1, 2025	N/A
14	2	"Chapter II: Undertow"	Chris Smith	May 8, 2025	N/A
15	3	"Chapter III: Cortes Bank"	Chris Smith	May 15, 2025	N/A
16	4	"Chapter IV: The Eddie"	Chris Smith	May 22, 2025	N/A
17	5	"Chapter V: Family Business"	Chris Smith	May 29, 2025	N/A

== Production ==
Smith was approached by Joe Lewis to direct a documentary feature film about McNamara. However, when the first cut of the film turned out to be six hours long, Smith felt it would be better suited as a docuseries. In February 2021, it was announced that a 6-episode documentary series would be produced by Topic Studios and distributed by HBO.

== Awards and nominations ==
Year	Award	Category	Nominee(s)	Result	Ref.
2022	American Cinema Editors Awards	Best Edited Documentary – (Non-Theatrical)	Connor Culhane, Adrienne Gits, Abhay Sofsky, and Brandon Valentin (for "Chapter I: Sea Monsters")	Nominated	
2022	Cinema Eye Honors	Outstanding Broadcast Cinematography	Chris Smith, Jerry Ricciotti, Mike Prickett, and Laurent Pujol	Nominated	
2022	Primetime Creative Arts Emmy Awards	Outstanding Documentary or Nonfiction Series	Joe Lewis, Chris Smith, Maria Zuckerman, Ryan Heller, Nancy Abraham, Lisa Heller, and Bentley Weiner	Nominated	
2022	Primetime Creative Arts Emmy Awards	Outstanding Cinematography for a Nonfiction Program	Mike Prickett and Laurent Pujol (for "Chapter IV: Dancing with God")	Won	
2022	Producers Guild of America Awards	Outstanding Sports Program	100 Foot Wave	Won	
2023	Primetime Creative Arts Emmy Awards	Outstanding Documentary or Nonfiction Series	Maria Zuckerman, Ryan Heller, Joe Lewis, Chris Smith, Nancy Abraham, Lisa Heller, and Bentley Weiner	Nominated	
2023	Primetime Creative Arts Emmy Awards	Outstanding Cinematography for a Nonfiction Program	Antoine Chicoye, Mikey Corker, Vincent Kardasik, Alexandre Lesbats, Chris Smith, Laurent Pujol, João Vidinha, and Michael Darrigade (for "Chapter VI: Force Majeure")	Won	
2023	Primetime Creative Arts Emmy Awards	Outstanding Picture Editing for a Nonfiction Program	Alex Bayer, Alex Keipper, and Quin O'Brien (for "Chapter III: Jaws")	Nominated	
2023	Primetime Creative Arts Emmy Awards	Outstanding Sound Editing for a Nonfiction or Reality Program (Single or Multi-Camera)	Max Holland, Eric Di Stefano, and Kevin Senzaki (for "Chapter V: Lost at Sea")	Nominated	
2023	Primetime Creative Arts Emmy Awards	Outstanding Sound Mixing for a Nonfiction Program (Single or Multi-Camera)	Keith Hodne (for "Chapter V: Lost at Sea")	Nominated	
2023	Primetime Creative Arts Emmy Awards	Outstanding Writing for a Nonfiction Program	Zach Rothfeld (for "Chapter V: Lost at Sea")	Nominated	
2024	American Cinema Editors	Best Edited Documentary (Non-Theatrical)	Alex Bayer, Alex Keipper, and Quin O'Brien (for "Jaws")	Nominated	
2024	Cinema Audio Society Awards	Outstanding Achievement in Sound Mixing for Television – Non-Fiction, Variety, or Music/Series or Specials	Keith Hodne (for "Chapter V: Lost at Sea")	Won	
2024	Golden Reel Awards	Outstanding Achievement in Sound Editing – Non-Theatrical Documentary	Keith Hodne, Max Holland, Eric Di Stefano, Kevin Senzaki, Eli Akselrod, and Mika Anami (for "Chapter V: Lost at Sea")	Nominated	
2024	Producers Guild of America Awards	Outstanding Sports Program	100 Foot Wave	Nominated	
2025	Primetime Creative Arts Emmy Awards	Outstanding Documentary or Nonfiction Series	Ryan Heller, Michael Bloom, Maria Zuckerman, Zach Rothfeld, Joe Lewis, Chris Smith, Nancy Abraham, Lisa Heller, Bentley Weiner, and Vincent Kardasik	Won	
2025	Primetime Creative Arts Emmy Awards	Outstanding Cinematography for a Nonfiction Program	Michael Darrigade, Vincent Kardasik, Alexandre Lesbats, Laurent Pujol, Karl Sandrock, and Chris Smith (for "Chapter III: Cortes Bank")	Won	
2025	Primetime Creative Arts Emmy Awards	Outstanding Sound Editing for a Nonfiction or Reality Program	Kevin Senzaki, Eric Di Stefano, Max Holland, Eli Akselrod, and Mika Anami (for "Chapter III: Cortes Bank")	Nominated	
2025	Primetime Creative Arts Emmy Awards	Outstanding Sound Mixing for a Nonfiction Program	Keith Hodne (for "Chapter III: Cortes Bank")	Nominated	
