= Nazaré, Portugal =

Nazaré
- Municipality
- Panoramic view of Nazaré and its beach

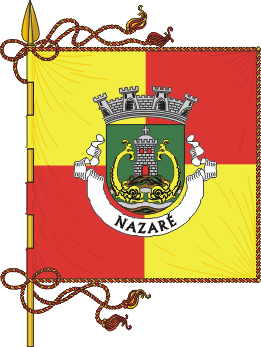
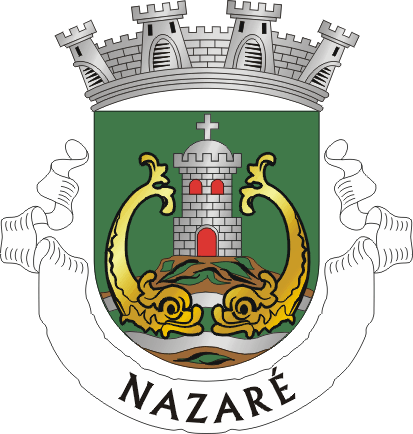
- Flag Coat of arms
- Interactive map of Nazaré
- Coordinates: 39°36′04″N 9°04′14″W
- Country: Portugal
- Region: Oeste e Vale do Tejo
- Intermunic. comm.: Oeste
- District: Leiria
- Parishes: 3

Government
  - President: Walter Chicharro (PS)

Area
  - Total: 82.43 km^{2} (31.83 sq mi)

Population (2021)
  - Total: 14,889
  - Density: 180.6/km^{2} (467.8/sq mi)
- Time zone: UTC+00:00 (WET)
  - Summer (DST): UTC+01:00 (WEST)
- Local holiday: September 8
- Website: www.cm-nazare.pt

Nazaré (Portuguese pronunciation: [nɐzɐˈɾɛ]) is a Portuguese resort town and municipality located in the Oeste region, in the historical province of Estremadura, and in the Leiria District. The municipality has a population of 14,889 in an area of 82.43 km^{2}, while the town itself has around 10,000 inhabitants.

Nazaré is one of the most popular seaside resorts in the Silver Coast (Costa de Prata). It is famous for its huge waves and surfing competitions. As of 2026, the record for the tallest wave ever surfed stands at a wave measured at 26.2 m (86 ft) at Nazaré in 2020, ridden by German surfer Sebastian Steudtner.

The town of Nazaré consists of three neighbourhoods: Praia (along the beach), Sítio (an old village, on top of a cliff) and Pederneira (another old village, on a hilltop). Praia and Sítio are linked by the Nazaré Funicular, a funicular railway.

The present mayor of Nazaré as of 2026 is Serafim António, a member of the Social Democratic Party. The municipal holiday is on 8 September, as part of the Our Lady Of Nazaré Festival, a ten-day religious and secular celebration with processions, bullfights, fireworks, folk dancing and a fair.

== Etymology ==
The name Nazaré is the Portuguese version of Nazareth, the biblical city in the Holy Land.

== History and legend ==
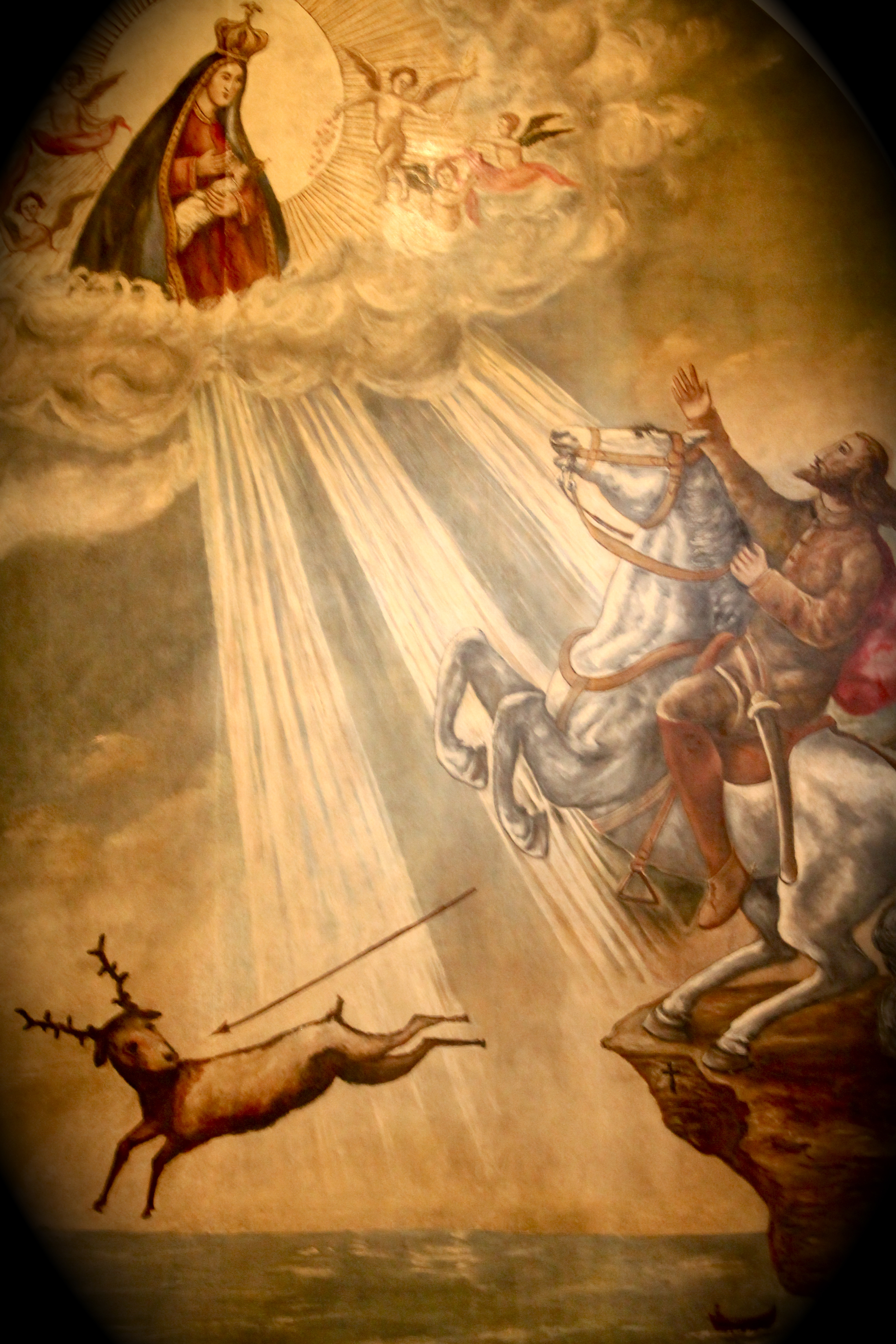
Miracle of Our Lady of Nazaré

The Sanctuary of Our Lady of Nazaré in Portugal

The earliest settlements were in Pederneira and in Sítio, above the beach. They provided the inhabitants with refuge against raids by Viking and, later, French, English and Dutch pirates that lasted until as late as the beginning of the 19th century. In fact, only in the 19th century, with the gradual end of maritime piracy, was it possible for the people to start occupying the Praia, which is today considered the town center.

According to the Legend of Nazaré, the town derives its name from a small wooden statue of the Virgin Mary, brought from Nazareth, in the Holy Land, to a monastery near the city of Mérida, Spain, by a monk in the 4th century. The statue was brought to its current location in 711 by another monk, Romano, accompanied by Roderic, the last Visigoth king of today's Portugal. After their arrival at the seaside, they became hermits. Romano lived and died in a small natural grotto on top of a cliff above the sea. After his death, according to his wishes, the king buried him in the grotto. Roderic left the statue of the Black Madonna in the grotto on an altar.

The first church in Sítio was built over the grotto to commemorate a reported miraculous intervention in 1182 by the Virgin Mary, alleged to have saved the life of the 12th-century Portuguese knight Dom Fuas Roupinho (possibly a templar) while he was hunting deer one morning in a dense fog. The episode is usually referred to as the Legend of Nazaré. In memory of the miracle, he built a chapel (Capela da Memória) over the small grotto, where the miraculous statue had been placed by king Roderic. Beside the chapel is a rocky outcrop 110 meters above the Atlantic. The story alleges that, in dense fog and at speed, Dom Fuas made a plea to the Virgin Mary, when his horse suddenly stopped at the edge of the point. Still visible is a mark allegedly made in the rock by one of the hooves of Dom Fuas' horse. The Church of Nazareth, later built on that high rocky outcrop over Pederneira Bay, is noted as a landmark in some sailors' manuals.

In 1377, King Fernando I of Portugal founded a new, more spacious church, which was totally transformed between the 16th and 19th centuries. The Sanctuary of Our Lady of Nazaré is a rich baroque building, with splendid tiles on its interior. Behind and above the main altar, visitors can see and venerate the miraculous statue of Our Lady of Nazaré. King John VI gave the church some religious figures, crowned with 18th century diadems. The sacred image is wrapped with a green cloak decorated with gold, gifted to the Virgin Mary by King John V. The main chapel is separated from the body of the church with an arcade made from pau-santo and a few pillars decorated with mosaics in 19th century Italian marble.

In January 2026, Storm Kristin caused a catastrophic impact in Nazaré.

== Geography ==
The municipality of Nazaré borders the Atlantic to the west and is surrounded entirely by the municipality of Alcobaça to the north, east and south.

=== Climate ===
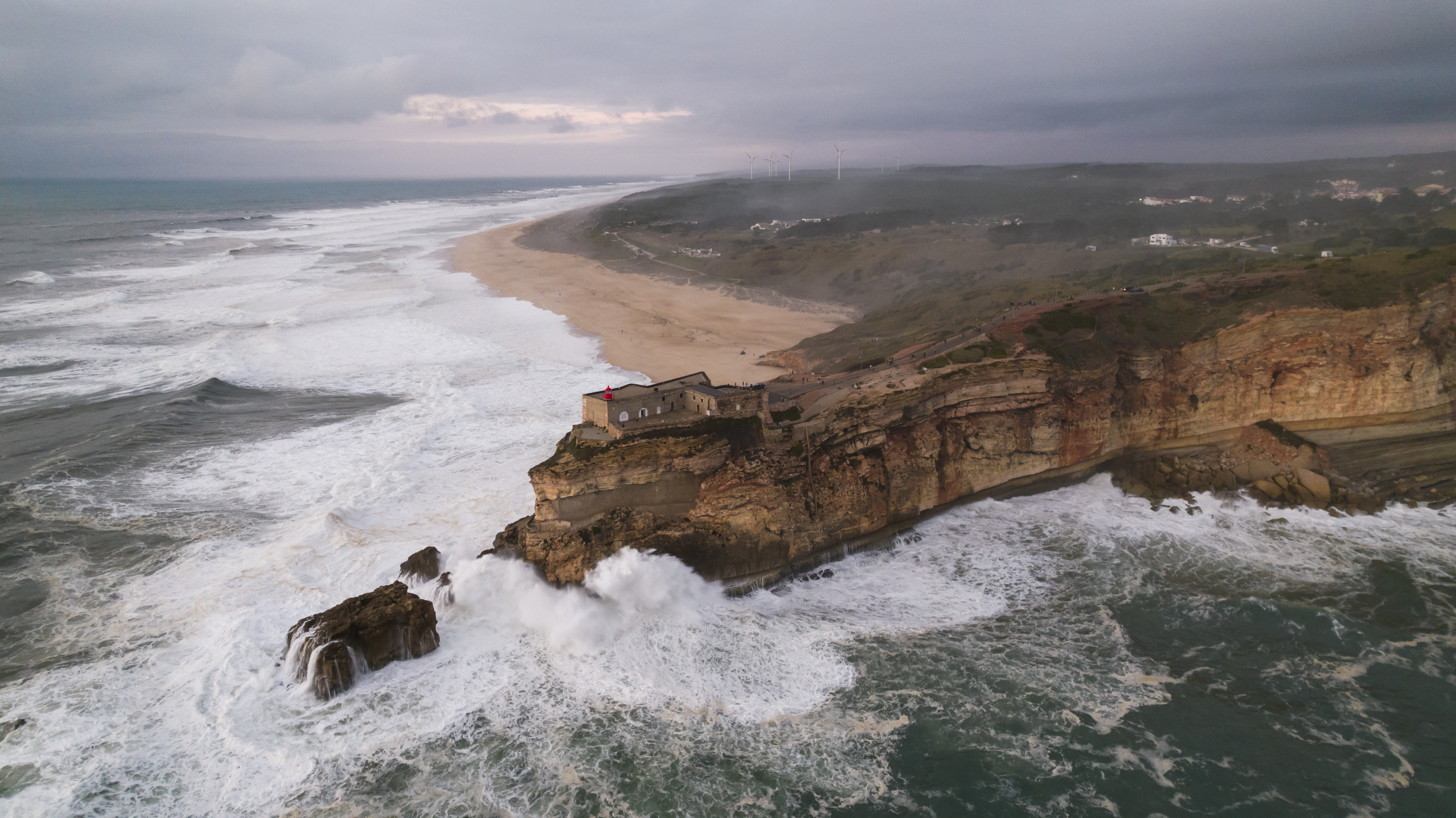
Fort of São Miguel Arcanjo in the wintertime

Nazaré has a Mediterranean climate (Köppen: Csb) with warm, dry summers and mild, wet winters. The town's climate is moderated by the Atlantic Ocean and the seasonal upwelling phenomena typical of western Portugal, which gives it cool to warm, dry and overall sunny summers. As a result of the marine layer, morning and evening fogs are frequent in the summer, persisting all day on rare occasions. In winter, seasonal downwellings frequently cause more unstable, Atlantic dominated weather and overcast, rainy and stormy days alternating with clear days. Compared to nearby inland towns such as Alcobaça, Nazaré's temperatures are much more heavily moderated by the sea, causing an average of just 2 days with above 30 °C (86 °F) maximums and 3 days with below 0 °C (32 °F) minimums per year. Nazare's seasonal lag is manifested by temperatures generally higher in September than in June.

Climate data for Nazaré (São Pedro de Moel), 1971-2000, altitude: 40 m (130 ft)
Month	Jan	Feb	Mar	Apr	May	Jun	Jul	Aug	Sep	Oct	Nov	Dec	Year
Record high °C (°F)	21.6 (70.9)	23.5 (74.3)	29.2 (84.6)	31.0 (87.8)	32.8 (91.0)	34.5 (94.1)	37.5 (99.5)	38.5 (101.3)	35.2 (95.4)	31.5 (88.7)	25.0 (77.0)	25.0 (77.0)	38.5 (101.3)
Mean daily maximum °C (°F)	14.2 (57.6)	14.7 (58.5)	16.0 (60.8)	16.4 (61.5)	17.7 (63.9)	19.7 (67.5)	20.8 (69.4)	21.1 (70.0)	20.9 (69.6)	19.2 (66.6)	16.9 (62.4)	15.1 (59.2)	17.7 (63.9)
Daily mean °C (°F)	10.4 (50.7)	11.2 (52.2)	12.1 (53.8)	13.1 (55.6)	14.7 (58.5)	16.8 (62.2)	17.8 (64.0)	18.0 (64.4)	17.4 (63.3)	15.7 (60.3)	13.4 (56.1)	11.6 (52.9)	14.4 (57.8)
Mean daily minimum °C (°F)	6.6 (43.9)	7.7 (45.9)	8.4 (47.1)	9.8 (49.6)	11.8 (53.2)	13.8 (56.8)	14.9 (58.8)	14.9 (58.8)	14.0 (57.2)	11.1 (52.0)	9.8 (49.6)	8.1 (46.6)	10.9 (51.6)
Record low °C (°F)	−4.5 (23.9)	−2.0 (28.4)	−0.5 (31.1)	−2.0 (28.4)	3.5 (38.3)	4.0 (39.2)	6.8 (44.2)	6.6 (43.9)	6.4 (43.5)	−1.8 (28.8)	−5.0 (23.0)	−5.5 (22.1)	−5.5 (22.1)
Average precipitation mm (inches)	81.7 (3.22)	70.4 (2.77)	45.9 (1.81)	58.3 (2.30)	52.3 (2.06)	22.3 (0.88)	9.0 (0.35)	10.6 (0.42)	32.2 (1.27)	79.8 (3.14)	91.2 (3.59)	98.2 (3.87)	651.9 (25.68)
Average precipitation days (≥ 0.1 mm)	13.7	13.1	10.4	12.6	10.2	6.2	3.8	3.8	7.2	12.1	13.0	14.5	120.6
Average relative humidity (%)	82	79	76	77	74	73	74	74	75	79	80	81	77
Source: IPMA, Portuguese Environmental Agency

Climate data for Nazaré (Alcobaça), 1991–2020, altitude: 36 m (118 ft)
Month	Jan	Feb	Mar	Apr	May	Jun	Jul	Aug	Sep	Oct	Nov	Dec	Year
Record high °C (°F)	23.7 (74.7)	25.0 (77.0)	29.8 (85.6)	33.0 (91.4)	35.3 (95.5)	40.1 (104.2)	40.0 (104.0)	42.8 (109.0)	38.5 (101.3)	35.0 (95.0)	28.3 (82.9)	23.7 (74.7)	42.8 (109.0)
Mean daily maximum °C (°F)	15.3 (59.5)	16.3 (61.3)	18.5 (65.3)	19.7 (67.5)	22.1 (71.8)	24.6 (76.3)	26.1 (79.0)	27.0 (80.6)	25.9 (78.6)	22.9 (73.2)	18.2 (64.8)	16.1 (61.0)	21.1 (69.9)
Daily mean °C (°F)	9.7 (49.5)	10.4 (50.7)	12.7 (54.9)	14.0 (57.2)	16.3 (61.3)	18.9 (66.0)	20.5 (68.9)	20.9 (69.6)	19.4 (66.9)	16.7 (62.1)	12.5 (54.5)	10.6 (51.1)	15.2 (59.4)
Mean daily minimum °C (°F)	4.0 (39.2)	4.5 (40.1)	6.8 (44.2)	8.2 (46.8)	10.4 (50.7)	13.1 (55.6)	14.9 (58.8)	14.8 (58.6)	13.0 (55.4)	10.5 (50.9)	6.9 (44.4)	5.2 (41.4)	9.4 (48.8)
Record low °C (°F)	−6.7 (19.9)	−6.2 (20.8)	−5.2 (22.6)	−0.5 (31.1)	1.0 (33.8)	4.7 (40.5)	7.3 (45.1)	6.0 (42.8)	3.5 (38.3)	0.2 (32.4)	−5.6 (21.9)	−5.8 (21.6)	−6.7 (19.9)
Average precipitation mm (inches)	112.6 (4.43)	81.7 (3.22)	74.1 (2.92)	83.2 (3.28)	61.8 (2.43)	18.8 (0.74)	7.5 (0.30)	12.7 (0.50)	38.1 (1.50)	102.5 (4.04)	127.8 (5.03)	104.4 (4.11)	825.2 (32.5)
Average precipitation days (≥ 1 mm)	11.7	8.9	9.3	10.0	7.7	3.6	1.5	2.0	4.9	9.8	11.8	11.0	92.2
Average relative humidity (%)	78	76	71	69	68	69	68	67	69	73	77	78	72
Source 1: Instituto Português do Mar e da Atmosfera
Source 2: Porto de Mós Municipality (IPMA: Humidity)

=== Human geography ===
Administratively, the municipality is divided into three civil parishes (freguesias):

- Famalicão
- Nazaré
- Valado dos Frades

== Culture ==
=== Tourism ===
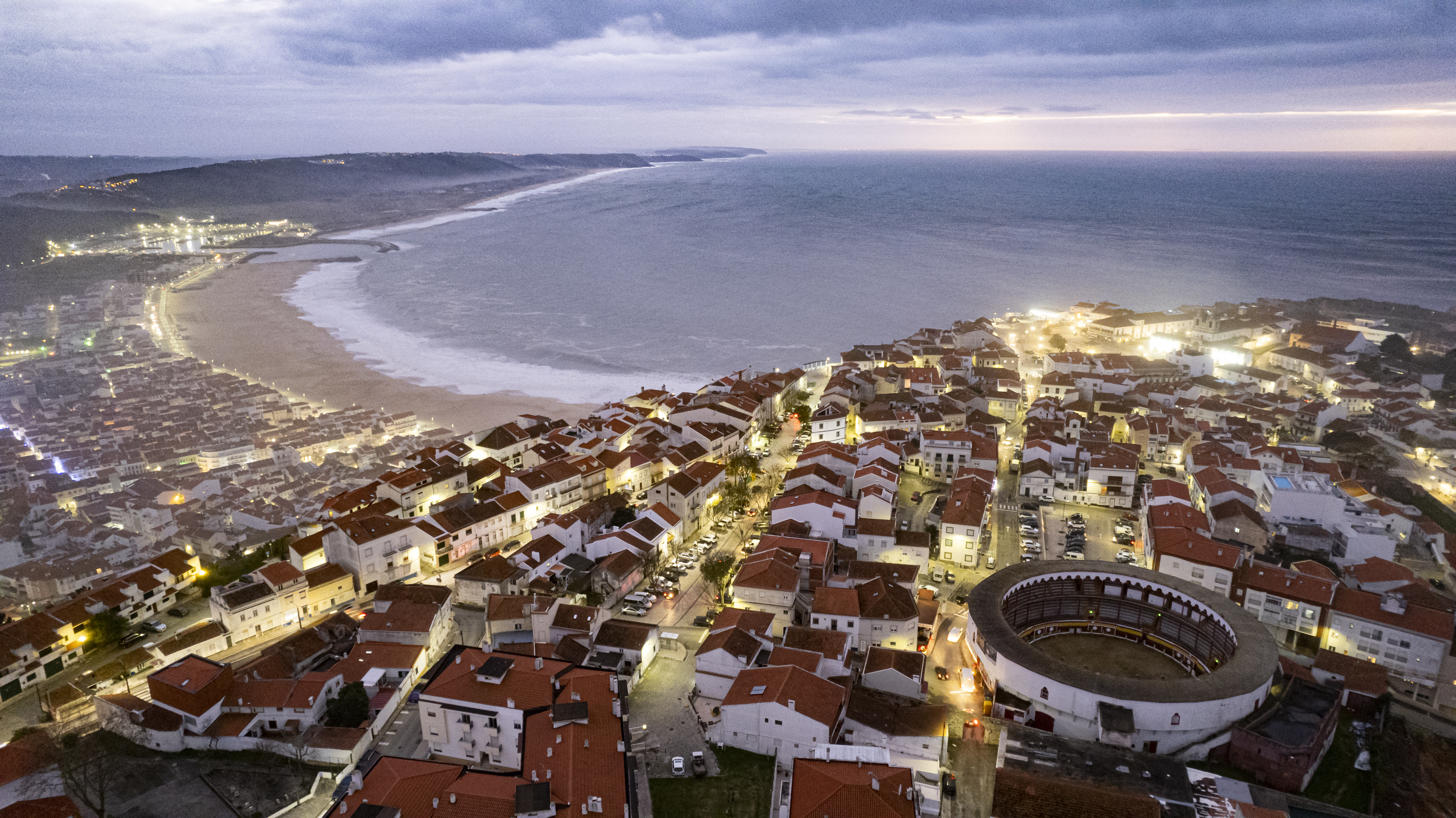
Panoramic view of the village

Over the 20th century, Nazaré progressively evolved from a fishing village to a point of interest among Portuguese and international tourists, advertising itself as a picturesque seaside village.

Located on the Atlantic coast, it has long sandy beaches, attracting many tourists in the summer. The town used to be known for the traditional costumes worn by the fishermen. Women traditionally wear a headscarf and flannel skirt, embroidered in seven different colours. The costumes are still worn occasionally.

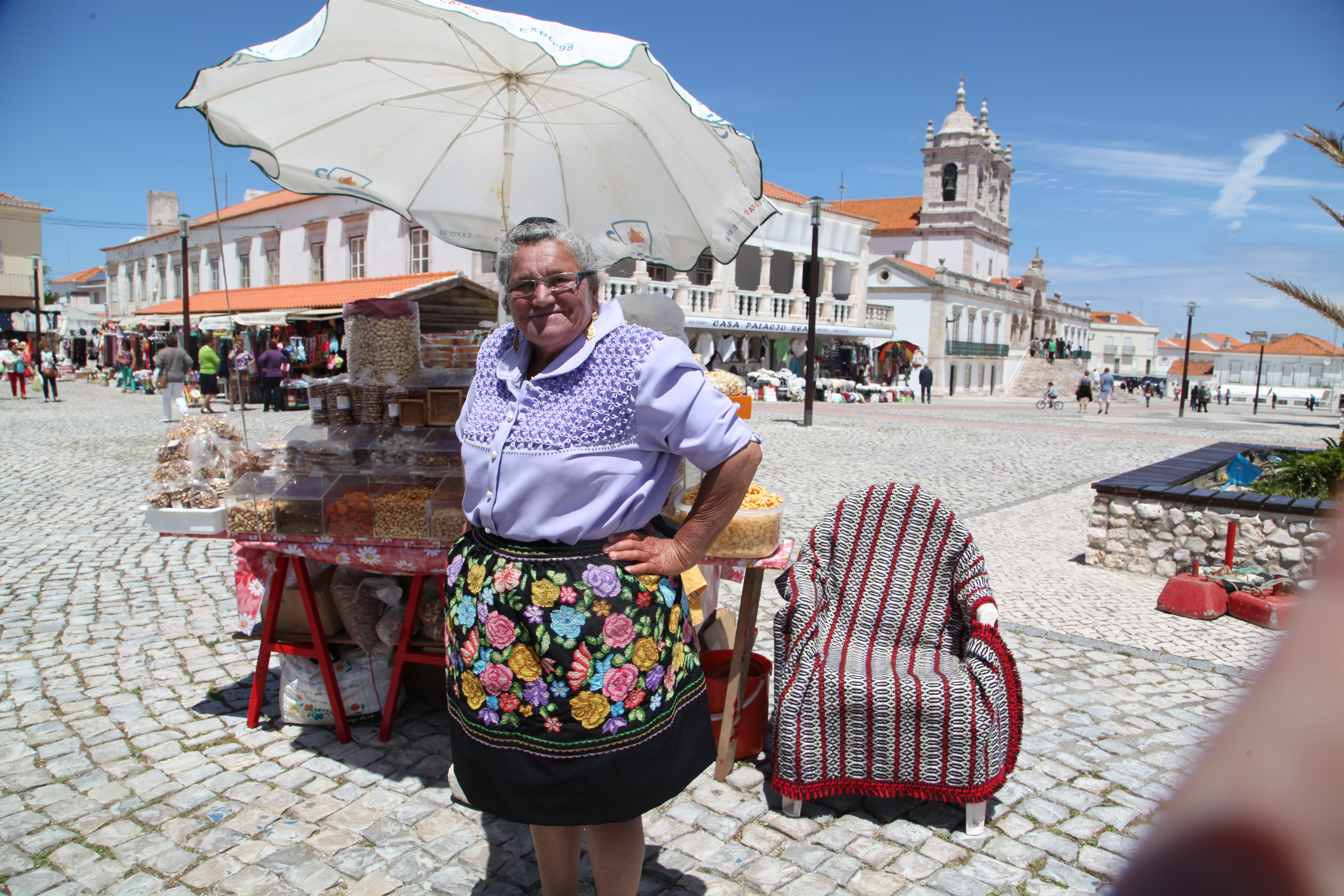
A woman from Nazaré wearing the traditional seven-coloured flannel skirts.

It is quite visited due to the religious festivals dedicated to Our Lady of Nazaré, in which there are processions and also some profane celebrations.

Many of the tourists and Catholic pilgrims who visit Central Portugal, and especially the internationally famous Sanctuary of Our Lady of Fátima (located nearby in Cova da Iria), go to Nazaré for a visit or to watch the surfing championships.

=== Museums and cultural centers ===
- Doctor Joaquim Manso Folk and Archeological Museum
- Sacred Art Museum of Reitor Luís Nesi
- Fisherman House-Museum
- Nazaré Bullring
- Nazaré Cultural Centre

=== Surfing ===
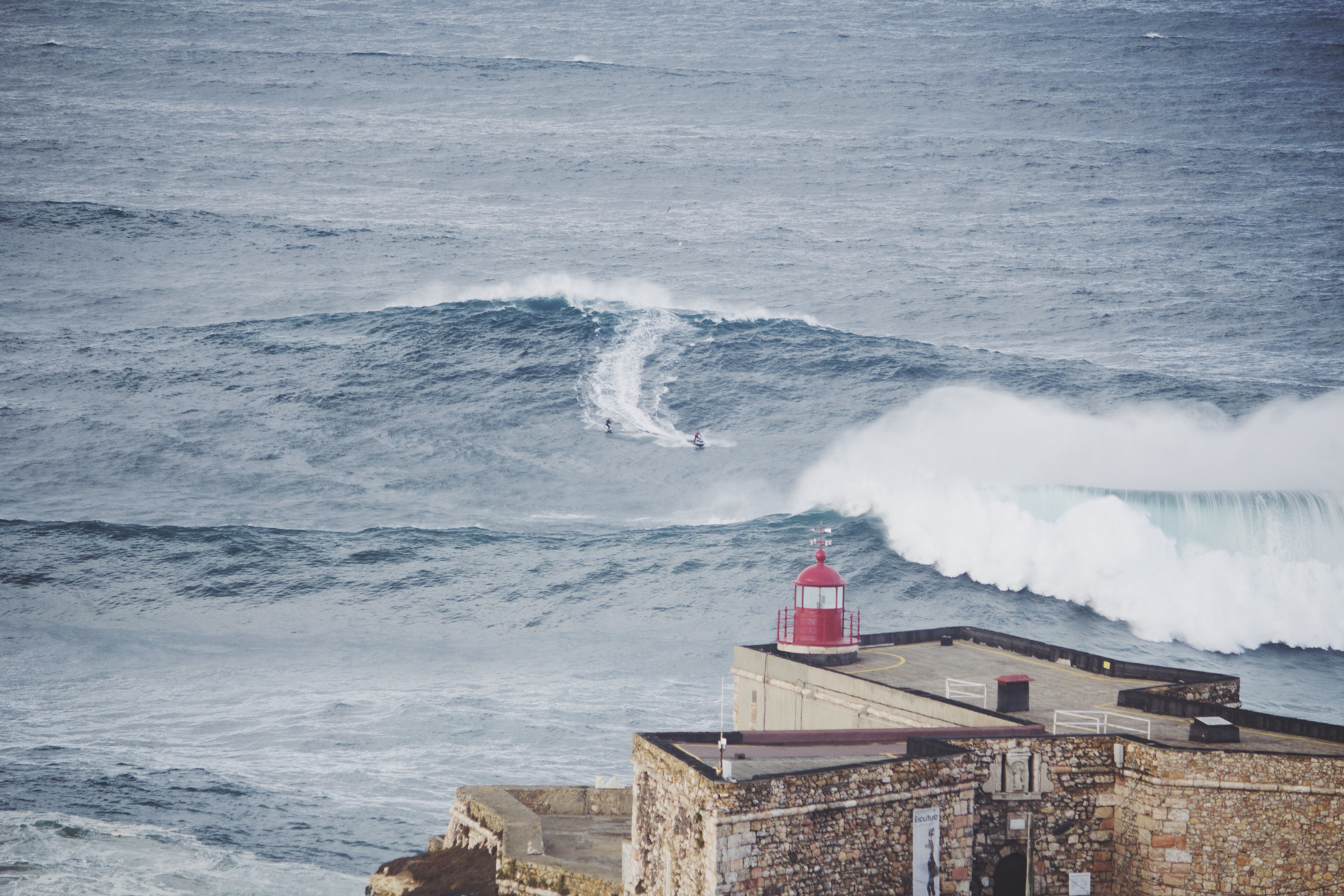
Tow-in surfing near the Fort of São Miguel Arcanjo lighthouse

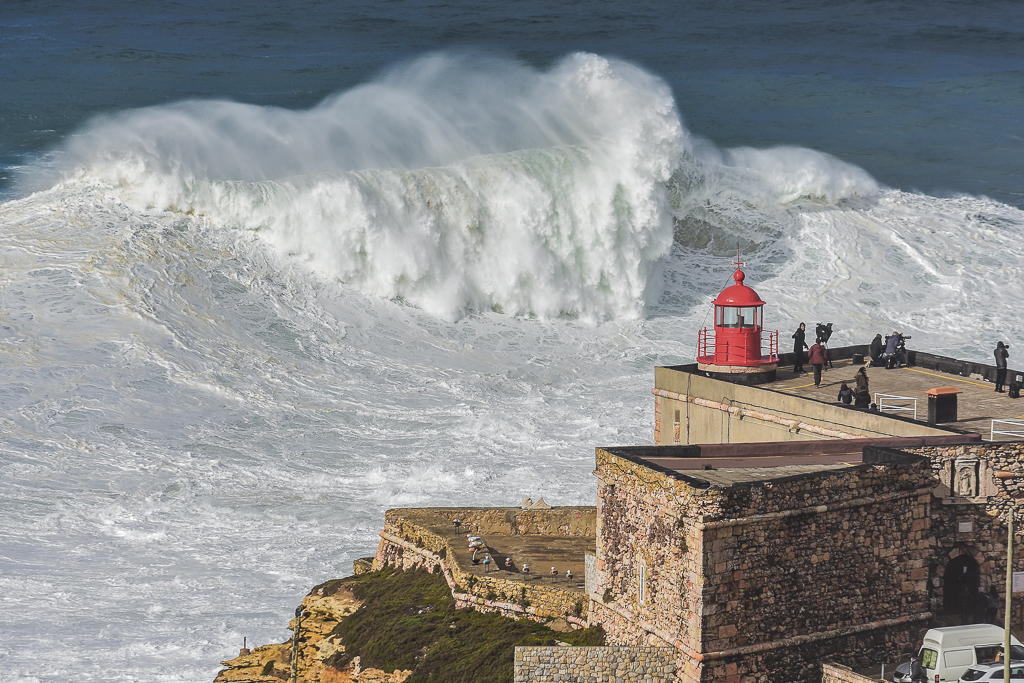
Giant breaking waves in Praia do Norte

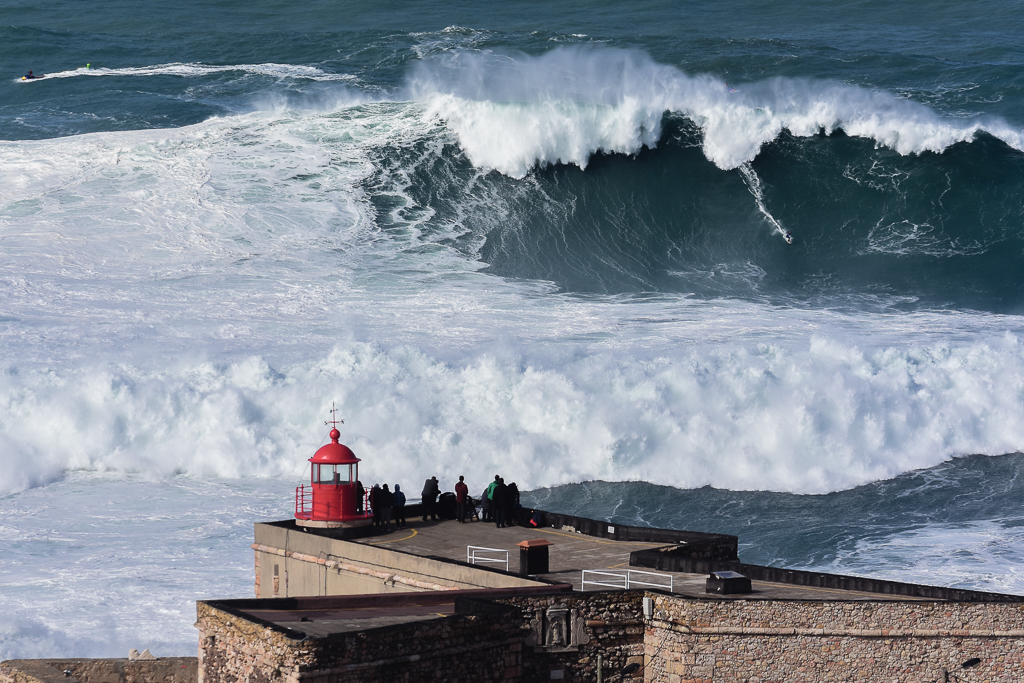
The Praia do Norte (North Beach) was listed on the Guinness World Records for the biggest waves ever surfed (formed under the influence of the Nazaré Canyon)

Nazaré is a popular surfing destination because of the high breaking waves that form due to the presence of the underwater Nazaré Canyon. The canyon increases and converges the incoming ocean swell which, in conjunction with the local water current, dramatically enlarges wave heights.

Due to the height of the waves, numerous surfing records have been set at Nazaré. In November 2011, surfer Garrett McNamara surfed a then-record-breaking giant wave measuring 23.8 m (78 ft) from trough to crest, at Praia do Norte, Nazaré. On 8 November 2017 Brazilian surfer Rodrigo Koxa broke the previous record by surfing a wave of 24.4 m (80 ft). In October 2020, German surfer Sebastian Steudtner broke this record, riding a wave which was measured at 26.2 m (86 ft). On 11 February 2020, Brazilian big-wave surfer Maya Gabeira set the women's record with a wave of 22.4 m (73 ft).

There has been a marked increase in visitors to viewing points for surfing competitions, such as the lighthouse at the Fort of São Miguel Arcanjo, which has seen numbers increase from 80,000 visitors in 2015 to 174,000 in 2017.

Nazaré is the principal location for the HBO surfing documentary series 100 Foot Wave, which as of 2025 has had three seasons (2021-2025).

In August 2012, a rogue wave killed a 5-year-old British girl and her grandfather walking along Salgado Beach. On 5 January 2023, Brazilian professional surfer Márcio Freire died whilst practicing tow-in surfing.

== International relations ==
Nazaré is twinned with:

- Badajoz, Spain (since 1987)
- Nogent-sur-Marne, France (since 1993)
- Zushi, Japan (since 2004)
- Consdorf, Luxembourg (since 2017)

== Notable people ==
- Luis Soares (born 1964 in Nazaré), a long-distance runner, competed for France at the 1992 Summer Olympics
- Brothers Ricardo Esgaio (born 1993) & Tiago Esgaio (born 1995), Portuguese footballers
- Brothers Mauro Eustáquio (born 1993) & Stephen Eustáquio (born 1996), Canadian footballers

== See also ==
- Legend of Nazaré
- Sanctuary of Our Lady of Nazaré
- Nazaré Canyon
- Nazaré Funicular
- Praia do Norte (Nazaré)
- Fort of São Miguel Arcanjo
