= Sebastian Steudtner =

German surfer

Sebastian Steudtner (born 4 May 1985) is a surfer and champion in big wave surfing. As of 2025 he holds the world record for the tallest measured wave ever surfed, at 26.21 m (86.0 ft), on October 29, 2020.

== Early life ==
Steudtner grew up in Germany, Nuremberg being his hometown. At age 16 he moved to Hawaii, on his own and with only the reluctant acquiescence of his parents, to pursue a surfing career.

== Career ==
Steudtner won the 2010, 2015 and 2021 WSL Biggest Wave awards. Steudtner was engaged to speak and work with English Premier League team Liverpool, conveying lessons and exercises from his surfing experience.

On October 29, 2020, in Nazaré, Portugal, Steudtner surfed a 26.21 m (86.0 ft) tall wave, the tallest measured wave ever surfed, with the assistance of his tow-in driver Alemão Maresias. The record was authenticated by the World Surf League as part of the Red Bull Big Wave Awards.

In an interview in 2021, Steudtner said that with improvements in rescue, support, and tow equipment, waves that are "much bigger" than currently could be surfed, and that that was his goal.

In 2024, Steudtner surfed a wave measured at 28.57 m (93.7 ft) at the same location. If officially ratified, it would surpass his own world record of the tallest wave ever surfed.

== Personal life ==
Steudtner's girlfriend and tow partner until 2021 was Maya Gabeira, who is the record holder for the tallest wave ever surfed by a woman, at 20.8 m (68.2 ft). They continue to support each other professionally.
