= Sunny Garcia =

American surfer (born 1970)

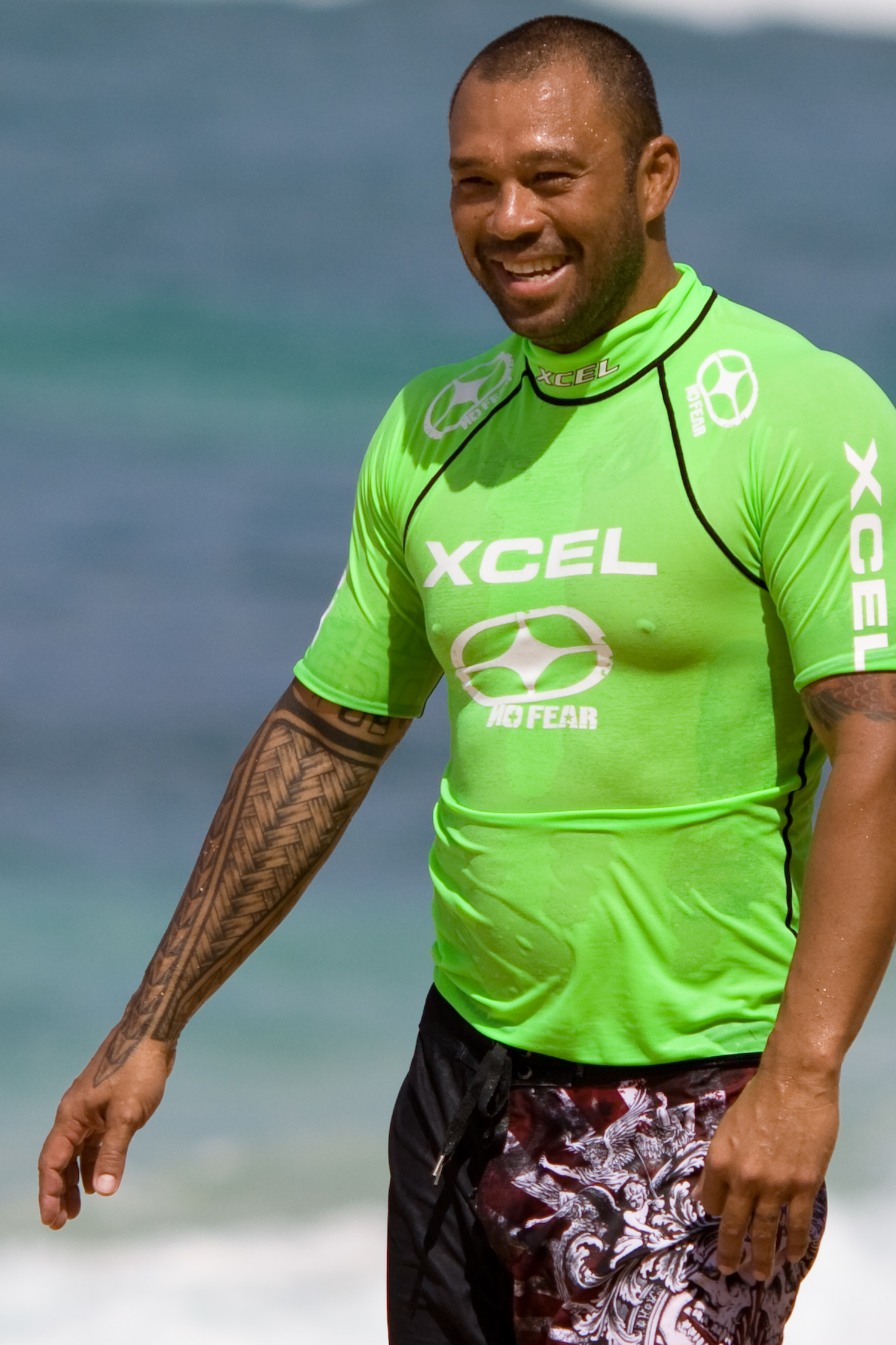
- Born: Vincent Sennen Garcia; January 14, 1970 (age 56); Mā'ili, Oahu, Hawai'i
- Children: 3
- Surfing career
- Years active: 1986–present
- Height: 5 ft 10 in (178 cm)
- Weight: 200 lb (91 kg) (as of 2004)
- Sport: Surfing
- Best year: Ranked first on the ASP World Tour, 2000
- Career earnings: $1,118,655 (as of 2009)
- Sponsors: Versasurf Traction, FCS fins
- Major achievements: ASP World Championship Tour; Victories:9; World Qualifying Series (WQS); Victories: 22

Surfing specifications
- Stance: Regular (natural) foot
- Shaper: Spider Murphy
- Favorite waves: Pipe and Mākaha

Vincent Sennen "Sunny" Garcia (born January 14, 1970) is an American professional surfer from Waianae, Hawaii. After leaving school he debuted on the 1986 Gotcha Pro at Sandy Beach, Oahu, beating the 1984 champ Tom Carroll.

His top surfing achievement was becoming the ASP WCT World Champion in 2000. Garcia also holds the record for most WQS event wins (22 wins) and holds six Triple Crown of Surfing titles. In addition, he was the second professional surfer to win over $1 million in prize money.

He initially retired in 2005 but returned to competition. In 2008, his hopes for ASP World Tour qualification were dashed with early elimination in the O'Neill World Cup of Surfing.

He has served prison time for tax evasion and was arrested for fighting.

== Career ==
Garcia was a dominant force in the Hawaiian Surfing Association starting as a 17-year-old on the 1986 WCT, beating former champion Tom Carroll and threatening to cause an upset to the top 16. Despite this early promise he just failed to break into this elite group in his debut season. The following year he finished in 16th position.

Garcia showed great consistency throughout the 1990s, finishing in the top ten every year and coming third four times. However, in 1995 it seemed that he might have reached the climax of his career. Failing to win the Pipeline Masters to claim the title, Sunny ended up finishing third behind Kelly Slater and Rob Machado. With a host of talented young blood set to qualify for the 1996 Dream Tour and declining fitness levels, it seemed Garcia's era was over.

Then, four years later, inspired by veteran Mark Occhilupo's shock 1999 WCT title, Garcia shed weight and moved to Kauai. There he surfed with the progressive Irons brothers, Andy and Bruce, expanding his surfing repertoire.

In 2000, 14 years after his debut, Garcia achieved the ultimate surfing accolade, emphatically dominating the ASP WCT from the start of the campaign, winning the first two events in Australia and clinching the title in Brazil, the penultimate event. On the way he also picked up a fifth Triple Crown in his native Hawaii.

After initially retiring from the professional surfing circuit in 2005, Garcia began competing on the WQS again. In 2008, he started slowly but moved into the top ten after a fifth-place finish in Scotland. Garcia was determined to win the series, and many people tipped him to do so but in the end early elimination in the O'Neill World Cup of Surfing, in his own backyard, meant he was denied a place on the 2009 Dream Tour.

In 2009 he had surgery on his knee and finished the year strongly, following a quarter-final berth in the Hawaiian pro with a runner-up spot to Triple Crown rival Joel Parkinson in the O'Neill World Cup. However, his attempt to clinch a seventh Triple Crown was denied when he lost his Pipemasters place after arriving late for his heat. Some consolation came from his standout performance at the 'Quiksilver in memory of Eddie Aikau' big wave contest ("The Eddie"), in which he finished third.

As of June 2010, he was placed 67th in the new ASP World Rankings, his best result being a quarter-final finish on the 'Sponsor me now Sunset Open' in January.

== Non-surfing work ==
In 2002, he starred in North Shore: Boarding House, a reality TV show featuring surfers living together. However, he generally chooses to steer clear of the North Shore hype, preferring to spend his time surfing alone or riding motocross. Garcia features in the Sunny Garcia Surfing video game. He also has a clothing deal with Affliction Clothing where the tattoos he has on his body have been replicated on his own custom shirt.

Garcia has volunteered for the charity Surfers Healing, a foundation for autism, which has included beach clean-up days held in Hawaii and along California's coast. In 2011, Garcia was the host of the Surfers for Cystic Fibrosis golf tournament fundraiser that has been organized by the charitable organization The Mauli Ola Foundation. Proceeds will fund surf experience days cystic fibrosis sufferers.

== Personal life ==
Garcia was born Vincent Sennen Garcia on January 14, 1970, in Mā'ili, on the Westside of Oahu, Hawaii. Garcia is of Puerto Rican and Hawaiian heritage from his father's side and Hawaiian, Chinese, Filipino, Irish, and Native American heritage from his mother's side. His nickname "Sunny" was given to him by his mother, due to his cheerful disposition as an infant. Following his parents' divorce, Garcia lived with his mother near Mā'ili point, close to the beach.

He has been married three times. He has three children from his first marriage. All three marriages ended in divorce, most recently in 2016.

In October 2006, Garcia was sentenced to federal prison for tax fraud after failing to pay taxes on unreported contest winnings from 1996 to 2001. Garcia failed to report over $471,000 in prize money on his tax returns for those years, resulting in a three-month sentence, beginning January 12, 2007, plus a further 7 months of house arrest and 80 hours community service with Goodwill. "I spent my money foolishly and didn't handle my affairs," he said outside the San Diego federal courtroom where he was sentenced.

On 21 February 2011, the ASP Rules and Disciplinary Committee convened to assess an alleged brawl involving Garcia, Jeremy Flores, and a local surfer, who allegedly dropped in on Garcia's teenage son while surfing on 19 February 2011 on the Gold Coast, Queensland, Australia. In accordance with the ASP Rulebook, immediately following the incident, then-active surfer Jeremy Flores was suspended from the 4-star Breaka Burleigh Pro event at Burleigh Heads, and then-eliminated surfer Garcia was suspended from the 4-star Burton Toyota Pro in Newcastle, New South Wales. An amateur cameraman who filmed the brawl alleged he was attacked by Sunny Garcia soon after, when he approached him on land. The cameraman lodged an official assault complaint with Gold Coast Police but withdrew it on the afternoon of 21 February 2011.

Witnesses allege Garcia went after the cameraman, knocking him to the ground and inflicting deep grazes to his back and arms with one of the man's hands receiving injuries. The cameraman told police he wanted to drop his complaint after receiving threats from locals and Garcia's overseas supporters warning of retribution and sought to lie low in his native Brazil until the surf rage furor died down. The cameraman was quoted as saying, "I'm too scared to press charges...Garcia could go to jail and then people would want to get me. At the moment I just don't feel safe...I've had threats on the internet I don't know how I'd protect myself and my family if something happened". Garcia sought legal advice from high-profile Gold Coast lawyer Chris Nyst. On 3 May 2011, Queensland Police Service confirmed an arrest warrant has been issued for a 41-year-old man on a charge of common assault, the reporting newspaper linked the warrant to Garcia. On 4 May 2011, Garcia's lawyer, Chris Nyst, confirmed the arrest warrant for Garcia, that it involves the young surfer who was allegedly assaulted, advised continued co-operation from Garcia with police and is confident his client would be exonerated.

On April 30, 2019, the World Surf League announced that Garcia was in critical condition at a Portland hospital. Garcia had attempted suicide the previous day. On September 17, 2019, Garcia's daughter, Kaila, reported that Sunny had previously been in a coma, but was speaking again and doing physical, speech and occupational therapy. Since December 2014, Garcia had been open about his struggles with depression and mental health, and encouraged those who deal with mental illness to talk about their feelings with others.

== Achievements ==
=== Titles/records held ===
- 2000 ASP WCT World Champion
- 2004 Triple Crown of Surfing
- 2000 Triple Crown of Surfing
- 1999 Triple Crown of Surfing
- 1994 Triple Crown of Surfing
- 1993 Triple Crown of Surfing
- 1992 Triple Crown of Surfing
- 1987–1988 ASP's Men's Most Improved award
- 1990 ASP's Men's Most Improved award
- Most victories in WQS competition (22)
- Most Triple Crown of Surfing titles (6)

=== History of wins ===
2004

- Vans Hawaiian Pro (Alii Beach - Hale'iwa, Hawaii)

2002

- G-Shock Hawaiian Pro (Alii Beach - Haleiwa, Hawaii)

2000

- Billabong Pro (Kirra Point - Gold Coast, Australia)
- Rip Curl Pro Bells Beach, (Australia)
- Panasonic Shockwave US Open (Huntington Beach, California)
- G-Shock Hawaiian Pro (Alii Beach - Haleiwa, Hawaii)
- Rip Curl World Cup (Sunset Beach - Oahu, Hawaii)

1997

- Katin Team Challenge (Huntington Beach, California)

1996

- Rip Curl Pro (Bells Beach, Australia)
- Town and Country (Ala Moana - Oahu, Hawaii)

1995

- Rip Curl Pro (Bells Beach, Australia)
- Quiksilver Surfmasters (Grande Plage - Biarritz, France)
- Rusty Pro (Honolua Bay - Maui, Hawaii)
- Op Pro (Huntington Beach, California)
- T&C/Bud Surf Tour Championships (Mākaha - Oahu, Hawaii)

1994

- Reunion Pro (Saint-Leu, Réunion)
- Billabong Kirra Pro (Kirra Point - Gold Coast, Australia)
- T&C/Bud Surf Tour Championships (Mākaha - Oahu, Hawaii)
- Hapuna World Cup of Surfing (Sunset Beach - Oahu, Hawaii)

1993

- HIC Pro (Banzai Pipeline - Oahu, Hawaii)
- Op Pro (Huntington Beach, California)
- Wyland Galleries Hawaiian Pro (Alii Beach - Haleiwa, Hawaii)

1992

- Gunston 500 (Durban, Natal, South Africa)
- T&C O'Neill Pro (Kuhio Beach - Maui, Hawaii)
- Pukas Pro (Zarauz, Basque Country, Spain)
- Marui/Surfin' Life Qualifying (Hebara Beach - Chiba, Japan)
- Miyazaki Qualifying (Miyazaki, Japan)
- Xcel Pro (Sunset Beach - Oahu, Hawaii)
- Wyland Galleries Hawaiian Pro (Alii Beach - Haleiwa, Hawaii)

1990

- Pukas Pro (Zarauz, Basque Country, Spain)
- Seland Pro (Sopelana, Basque Country, Spain)

=== Awards ===
In 2010, Sunny was inducted into the Surfing Walk of Fame at Huntington Beach.

Achievements
Preceded by Mark Occhilupo	Association of Surfing Professionals World Champion (men's); 2000	Succeeded by C. J. Hobgood
