= Fred Hemmings =

American politician

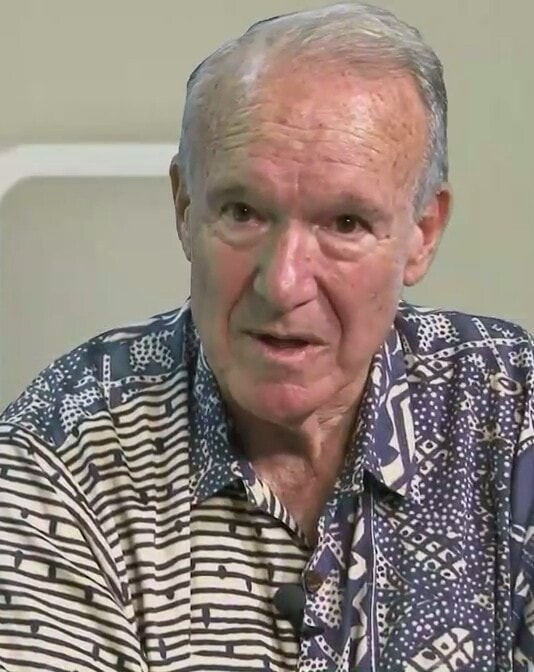
- Hemmings in 2018, discussing his book Local Boy: A Memoir

Member of the Hawaii Senate from the 25th district
- In office November 2000 – November 2010
- Preceded by: Whitney Anderson
- Succeeded by: Pohai Ryan

Member of the Hawaii House of Representatives from the 24th district
- In office November 1985 – November 1990
- Preceded by: Byron Baker
- Succeeded by: Jane Tatibouet

Personal details
- Born: January 9, 1946 (age 80) Honolulu, Hawaii, U.S.
- Party: Republican
- Children: 4, including Heath, Meaghan, Kaui Hart Hemmings, step son Gordon Kowalkowski

Fred Hemmings Jr. (born January 9, 1946) is an American surfer, author, businessman, and politician.

Born and raised in Hawaii, Fred Hemmings attended Punahou school where he was co- captain of the Honolulu league championship football team in 1964. Hemmings won the Makaha International Surfing Championships (2x senior and 2x junior), the Peruvian Championships, and the World Surfing championship (Puerto Rico 1968). He retired from competition and created the first major professional surfing events, including the Pipeline Masters, 1971. Along with Randy Rarick, he co-founded the first pro surfing circuit operated under the banner of International Professional Surfing. The Pro surfing circuit is now operated by the World Surfing League, WSL. Hemmings served as a Republican member of the Hawaii Senate from the 25th District from 2001 to 2011. Hemmings is credited with the founding of Papahanaumokuakea the world largest marine sanctuary created by presidential Executive order by President George W. Bush. The NW archipelago was part of Senator Hemmings district. Elected in 2000, he served as Senate Republican Leader from 2002 to 2010. Previously he was a member of the Hawaii House of Representatives from 1984 through 1990.

During the 1960s, Hemmings won the Mākaha International Surfing Championships four times, two Junior division and two Senior wins, He also won the Peruvian International Surfing Championships in 1964, and then from the surf of Rincon, Puerto Rico, Hemmings won the World Surfing championship in 1968. Hemmings is credited with being the “father of Professional surfing”. He inaugurated the Pipeline masters in 1971, and owned and produce all the events in the Triple Crown of Surfing. All three major television networks had contracts with Hemmings to cover his events. Fred Hemmings cofounder along with Randy Rarick of Hawai’i the first world pro tour of surfing which is now operated by the World Surfing League. Hemmings was also a steersman on four Molokai to Oahu Outrigger Canoe racing Champion teams, and to this day is a pioneer canoe surfing steersman. He attended Punahou School where he is an inductee of the Punahou School Athletic Hall of Fame. Hemmings was inducted into the International Surfing Hall of Fame, and in 1999 the Hawaii State Sports Hall of Fame.

He was the Republican nominee for Governor of Hawaii in the 1990 election. He had lost the general election to incumbent Democratic governor John D. Waiheʻe III.

Hemmings has authored several books including his best seller Local Boy: A Memoir.

== Background ==
Hemmings was born on January 9, 1946, to Fred Sr. (of English, Irish, French, and Indian descent, the elder Hemmings was originally from New York City and came to Hawaii in 1922) and Lilian Frietas Hemmings (her Portuguese ancestors came to Hawaii to work on a sugarcane plantation in 1883). In his early childhood, young Fred and three of his five siblings contracted polio but suffered no lasting debility.

As a student at Punahou School, Hemmings played competitive football. He was a league all-star player on Punahou's 1964 championship football team.

== Athletics ==
=== Surfing ===
Surfing at Makaha, 1966

Hemmings began surfing at the age of 8 at Waikiki. Four years later in 1958, Fred Hemmings began competing in surfing events. That year he placed 3rd in the Makaha International Surfing Championships in the junior men division. He placed first in the following years that he entered (1961, 1963, 1964 and 1966). He continued to enter surfing contests taking him as far as Peru, where he won the Peruvian International Championship. In 1968, Hemmings won the World Surfing Championship in Puerto Rico. After becoming the world's first true surfing champion from Hawaii, Hemmings retired from competitive surfing to focus on creating a new sports industry; promoting and marketing surfing as a viable professional sport.

In 1969, Hemmings produced the Smirnoff World Pro-Am Surfing Championships which became the de facto professional world championships. Hemmings created the Pipeline Masters surf competition in 1971 which is now the longest standing surf contest in the world. Enthralling national audiences, the competition was aired on ABC's Wide World of Sports.

Often, Hemmings found himself at odds with the surf culture, conflicting with the counterculture movement of the 1960s. He consistently spoke out against substance abuse in surfing.

Hemmings was a strong advocate for women in professional surfing. In 1975 Hemmings founded the World Cup of Surfing championships with events for both men and women. With dedicated persistence and corporate sponsorship backing the events, surfing competitions at legendary North Shore sites established a strong following and gained a national audience. All the major television networks took notice and broadcast the surfing events Hemmings produced nationally.

Hemmings continued to pursue his dream to make professional surfing a reality. In 1976 Hemmings co-founded, along with Randy Rarick, the organization of International Professional Surfers (IPS). IPS became the first professional surfing circuit, hosting 12 events around the world. Respecting Hawaii's legendary status in surfing, the tour was formatted so that at least three of the events were held in Hawaii. This organization became the forerunner to the World Surfing League.

In 1983, Hemmings combined the Pipeline Masters at the Banzai Pipeline in Oahu, the Duke Classic at Sunset Beach, and the Reef Hawaiian Pro at Haleiwa Ali'i Beach Park, into the Triple Crown of Surfing. The Honolulu Advertiser heralded Fred Hemmings as the "father of professional surfing in Hawaii."

In 2010, he was invited by the Puerto Rico Tourism Company to attend the Rip Curl Pro Search 2010, where he was honored for his 1968 championship. In 2018 the Puerto Rico Tourist bureau hosted a week long festival in Rincon, PR for the 50th anniversary of the World Surfing Championships.

=== Paddling ===
Simultaneously with surfing, Hemmings is also known as a champion canoe paddler and steersman. Hemmings was on the championship teams in the Molokai to Oahu canoe races in 1967, 1968, 1975 and the Masters in 1984. He also holds the record for most career wins for steering crews in the July 4th. canoe races held through the surf at Waikiki beach.

== Boards and commissions ==
Board of Directors Portuguese Chamber of Commerce 2019-

Trustee, LeJardin School 2015-16

Trustee Hawai’i Strategic Development Corp. Appointed by Governor Ige 2014-15)

Commissioner, Hawaii Commemorative Quarter Advisory Commission, Appointed by Governor Lingle (2006–2007)

- Commissioner, Governor's Economic Momentum Commission, appointed by Governor Lingle (2005)
- Member, Hawaii 2050 Sustainability Task Force (2005–2006)
- Commissioner, Governor's Millennium Commission, Appointed by Governor Cayetano (2000)
- Director, Children's Advocacy (1991)
- Trustee, Outrigger Duke Kahanamoku Foundation (1990–1991)
- Board of Directors, Denver Broncos - National Football League (1984–2015)
- Founder and President, International Professional Surfing (1976–1983)
- Honorary Lifetime Director, United States Surfing Federation (1987–present)
- Founder and Producer, Triple Crown Surfing (1983–1988)
- Lifetime Director, Association of Surfing Professionals (1985–present)
- Board of Directors, Hui Nalu O`Hawaii (1976–1979)
- Board of Directors, Boys Club of Honolulu (1976–1979)
- Board of Directors, Outrigger Canoe Club (1972–1973, 1975–1976)

== Awards and honors ==
Rincon Puerto Rico Surfing Walk of Fame, inducted 2018

- Waterman Hall of Fame, Outrigger Duke Kahanamoku Foundation (2010)
- Surfing Walk of Fame, Huntington Beach, California (2009)
- Lincoln Legacy Award, Republican Party Hawaii (2006)
- Legislator of the Year, Hawaii Medical Association (2005)
- Waterman of the Year, Surf Industry and Manufacturer Association (2002)
- Listed Top 50 Athletes of Hawaii for 20th Century, Sports Illustrated (2000)
- Osmar Legend of Surfing Award, Brazil (2000)
- Hawaii Sports Hall of Fame (1999)
- Legends of Surfing Award (1997)
- Punahou School Athletic Hall of Fame (1994)
- International Surfing Hall of Fame (1991)
- Service to the Sport of Surfing Award, Association of Surfing Professionals (1989)
- Top Ranking Legislator, Small Business Hawaii (1985–1990, 2001–2005)
- Winged "O" Sportsman Award, Outrigger Canoe Club (1969)
- Top Ten Businessmen's Award, Honolulu Junior Chamber of Commerce (1969)
- Duke Kahanamoku Sportsman Award (1969)
- Goodwill Tours with Duke Kahanamoku, State of Hawaii (1966–1967)
- Athlete of the Year, Honolulu Quarterback Club (1964)

== Talent, Advertising and Promotional Credits ==
- Co-Host, "Equal Time with Fred Hemmings", KHNR Radio 97.5 (2004–2006)
- Radio Talk Show Host, KGU Radio (1991–1992)
- Commentator, "Sports World", National Broadcasting Company (1979–1983)
- Commentator, "Wide World of Sports", American Broadcasting Company (1970–1975, 1978)
- Commentator, "Sports Spectacular", Columbia Broadcasting System (1976–1977)
- Producer/host, "Hawaii Sports Scene", KITV (1972)
- Consultant/test pilot—first artificial wave machine, "Big Surf", Clairol Incorporated (1969)
- National Television Commercials—United Airlines (1966), Kellogg's Cereal (1967), Eastman Kodak Co. (Europe) French Commercial (1970)

== Journalism and books ==
- Author, The Soul of Surfing is Hawaiian, Nonfiction Best Seller, Hawaii (1997) ISBN 1-56025-205-7
- Contributing Political Editor, Honolulu Magazine (1991–1992)
- Co-Author, "Illustrated Surfing Encyclopedia", Japan (1979)
- Author, "Surfing, Hawaii's Gift to the World" (1977)
- Weekly Columnist, Honolulu Star-Bulletin (1966)
- Author, Local Boy: A Memoir (2017)

== Relatives ==
Fred Hemmings has four children: son Heath, Daughters Meaghan and Kaui, step son Gordon and seven grandchildren Trevor, Merrick, Hanna, Eleanor, Leo, Talcott, and Kiera. The Descendants was written by daughter Kaui Hart Hemmings.

Achievements
| Preceded by Nat Young | International Surfing Association Men's World Surfing Champion; 1968 | Succeeded by Rolf Aurness |
Party political offices
| Preceded by D. G. Anderson | Republican nominee for Governor of Hawaii; 1990 | Succeeded by Pat Saiki |
| Preceded by Billie Beamer | Republican nominee for Lieutenant Governor of Hawaii; 1994 | Succeeded by Stan Koki |
