= Surfing in the United States =

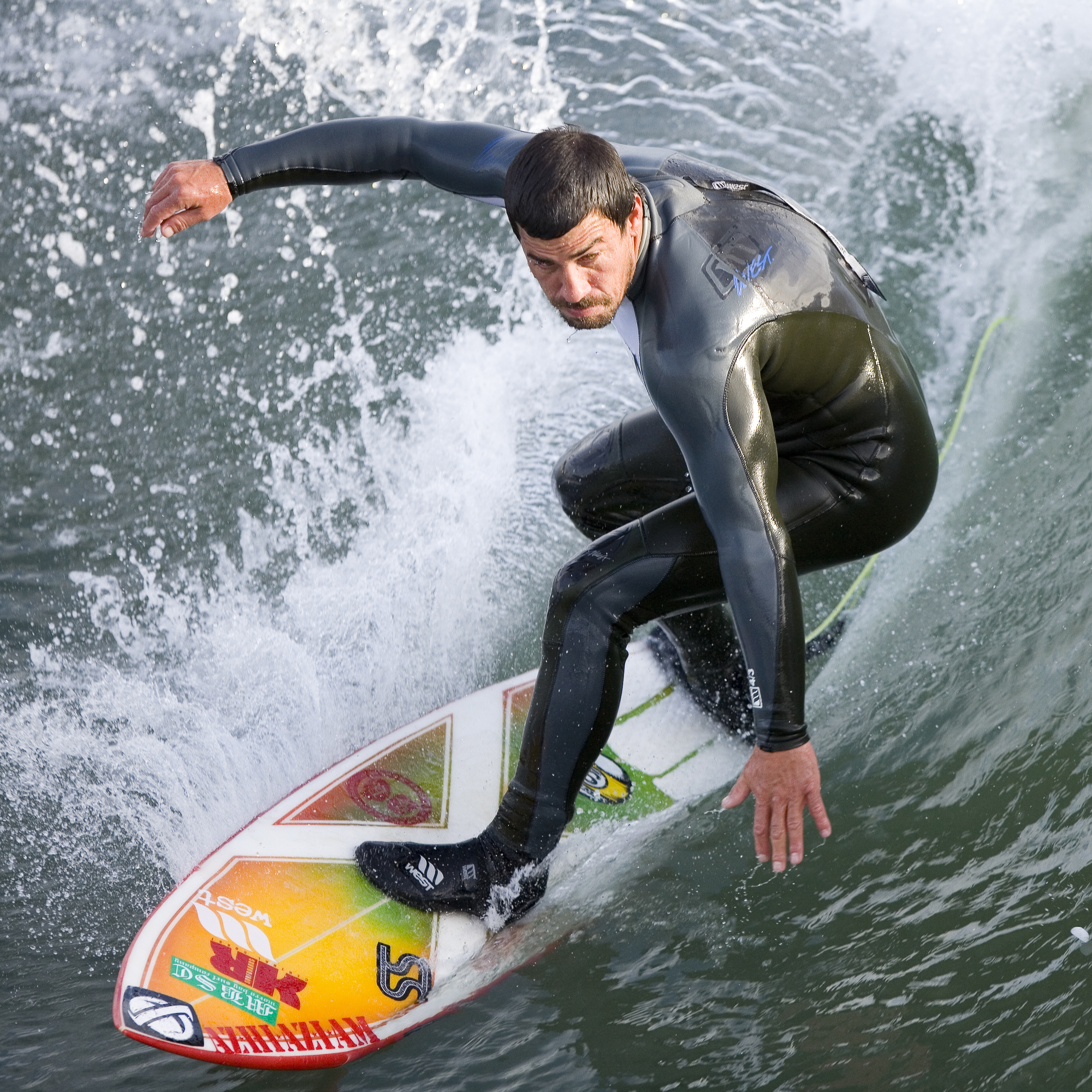
- A surfer at the Cayucos Pier, Cayucos, California
- Country: United States
- Governing body: USA Surfing
- National team: United States Olympics team

National competitions
- World Surf League

International competitions
- Summer Olympics; World Surfing Championships

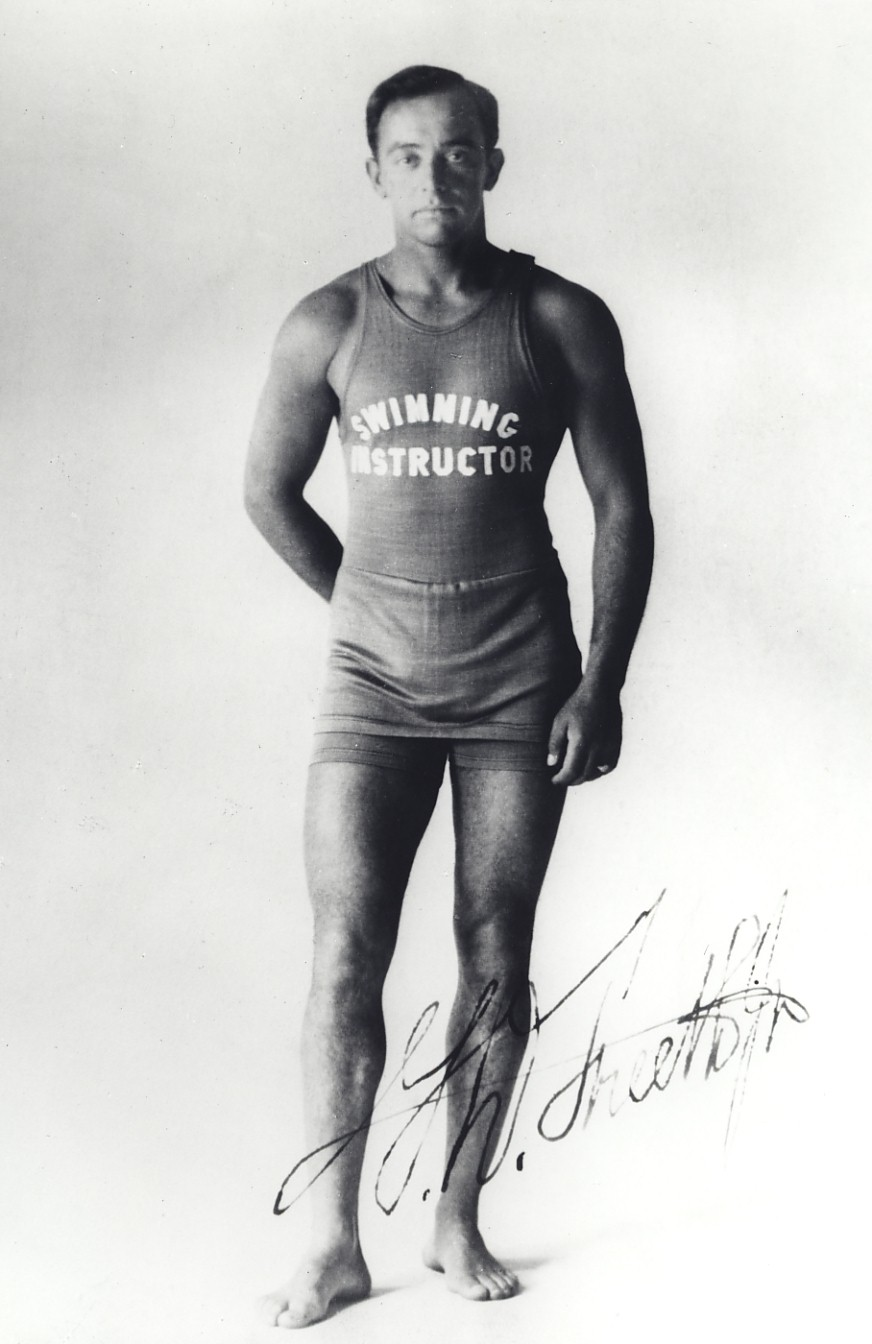
George Freeth, 1883-1919

Surfing in the United States is a popular hobby in coastal areas, and more recently due to the invention of wave pools, inland regions of the country. It contributes to a lifestyle and culture in which millions participate and which millions more have an interest. USA Surfing is the National Governing Body (NGB) for the sport of surfing in the United States, with surf leagues such as the World Surf League available in the country. Surfing can be traced back to 17th Century Hawaii and has evolved over time into the professional sport it is today, with surfing being included for the first time in the 2020 Summer Olympics in Tokyo.

== History ==
Surfing was first documented by Captain James Cook in 1767 during his expeditions across the Pacific Ocean in Tahiti and Hawaii, however research suggests that surfing dates back to ancient Polynesian cultures up to a thousand years ago. Throughout the Pacific, wave-riding existed in various forms, however only in Hawaii did it embed itself within the social, political and religious fabric of society. At the time of the European's arrival surfing was deeply embedded in Hawaiian society. Hawaiian petroglyphs dated to AD 1000 depict surfing and surfboard making. The boards in Hawaii were longer and heavier than other Polynesian colonies, and only there were references to sitting, kneeling and standing on specialised surfboards recorded dating back to AD 500. By 1778 ancient Hawaiians were using three types of timber to make surfboards – Acacia koa, Artocarpus altilis, and Erythrina sandwicensis. Hawaiian balsa was the post popular material to craft surfboards with due to its light weight and superior buoyancy. Surfing in ancient Hawaii transcended class divisions, with men, women and children all riding waves for pleasure. Most Hawaiian families owned a surfboard, and were decorated and named. For ancient Hawaiians surfing was seen as a social, communal and even sexual activity.

Surfing was brought to the United States in July 1885 when three teenage Hawaiian princes, David Kawananakoa, Edward Keliʻiahonui and Jonah Kūhiō Kalaniana'ole, surfed the mouth of the San Lorenzo River in Santa Cruz on custom-shaped redwood boards. In 1907 George Freeth demonstrated surfing as a publicity stunt at Venice Beach to promote Abbot Kinney's resort, Venice of America.

Surfing on the East Coast of the United States was pioneered in 1909 by Burke Haywood Bridgers in Wrightsville Beach, North Carolina. After finding little success with lightweight, juniper boards, Bridgers wrote to Alexander Hume Ford and the Hawaiian newspapers for advice about board shapes and design, and surfing styles. Bridgers continued to craft his own surfboards and promote surfing in North Carolina. Duke Kahanamoku, the father of modern surfing, introduced the sport to New Yorkers at Rockaway Beach in 1912 while en route from Honolulu to the 1912 Summer Olympics in Stockholm.

In the early 1900s, surfing began to be recognised by international sporting agencies as a legitimate sport. Alexander Hume Ford created the Hands-Around-the-Pacific Club in 1911, which was later renamed the Pan Pacific Union in 1917. The organisation focused on the outgrowth of Pacific-area tourism promotion activities, and sponsored the Mid-Pacific Carnival in 1913 at Waikiki, Honolulu. Duke Kahanamoku made his first visit to Huntington Beach, California in the early 1920s, following his Olympic gold medal win at the 1912 Olympics. He is credited with popularising surfing in Southern California from 1913 to 1929. By mid-to late 1930s tens of thousands of Americans were travelling to Hawaii every year and experiencing surfing.

Surfing's popularity began to increase in the United States post-WWII and peaked in the 1960s. Now called the U.S. Open of Surfing, the West Coast Surfing Championship was the first surfing tournament in the United States and was held in 1959 at Huntington Beach, California.

The International Professional Surfers (IPS) was founded by Hawaiian surfers Fred Hemmings and Randy Rarick in 1976. The Association of Surfing Professionals was founded in 1983 before officially becoming the World Surf League (WSL) in 2015. 11 U.S. men and women now compete in the WSL.

In 2016, The International Olympic Committee (IOC) voted unanimously for the inclusion of surfing in the Tokyo 2020 Olympic Games. At the 2020 Olympics, American Carissa Moore won the inaugural gold medal in the Women’s shortboard competition. Three years later, fellow American Caroline Marks won gold in the same event at the 2024 Summer Olympics. When Los Angeles hosts the 2028 Summer Olympics, the surfing competition will be held at Trestles in nearly San Clemente.

== Surfing culture in the United States ==
Surfing's popularity began to grow post-World War II. With the expansion of the middle class in the 1950s, the number of American consumers who sought leisure at the beach grew dramatically. As surfing became more popular, especially amongst young people, it became more than a recreational hobby and affected music, fashion, literature, film and art and jargon. For many beachgoers, especially after the release of Hollywood surf film “Gidget” in 1959, surfing became a subcultural pastime. Some other aspects of surf culture in the 1960s include the Woodie, bikinis, boardshorts and surf music such as ‘The Beach Boys’’ “Surfin’ Safari” released in 1962.

Huntington Beach, California, is commonly referred to as "Surf City USA" due to its longstanding connection to the surfing community. The city gained prominence in the 1960s as a surf destination and remains a major center of surfing culture today. Huntington Beach hosts the annual U.S. Open of Surfing, one of the largest surfing competitions in the world, and is home to the International Surfing Museum. Its 9.5-mile stretch of beach and consistent wave conditions have helped establish its reputation as a symbol of American surf culture.

John Severson founded “The Surfer”, the world's first surfing magazine, in 1959.

Some popular U.S. surf ware and apparel brands include “O’Neill” founded by Jack O’Neill in California in 1952, “Vans” founded in 1966, “Channel Islands Surfboards” founded in 1969, and “Dakine” founded in 1979.

Surfboard shaping is a major part of surfing culture in the United States. Legendary American shapers such as Dale Velzy, Hobie Alter, and Bob McTavish helped pioneer the craft of modern surfboard design in the mid-20th century, creating innovations like the lighter fiberglass boards that revolutionized the sport. Today, California and Hawaii remain major centers for surfboard shaping, with thousands of boards handcrafted annually. The craft has evolved from traditional single-fin longboards to highly specialized shortboards and big wave guns, supporting a vibrant industry of independent and commercial shapers.

Territorialism has arisen in surf breaks with large amounts of surfers located close to a large population center. Territorialism involves regular surfers becoming confrontational and territorial about their local surf breaks, especially at surf breaks that attract many seasonal vacationers. This has led to the creation of loose surf gangs who protect their surf break from tourists. Some prominent Southern Californian gangs include Malibu Locals Only and Lunada Bay Boys, with the main surf gang in Hawaii known as the ‘da huis’. These gangs have been known to use verbal and physical confrontation to deter tourists from their surf breaks. Territorialism often occurs due to socioeconomic factors. Many surfers originally came from a lower economic class and resented well-off vacationers who visited their towns to surf recreationally.

Surfing is growing amongst the African American community, despite being seen as a "white sport".

== Demographics ==
There are over 3.5 million surfers in the US, with youth accounting for approximately 32% of that demographic. The average surfer in the United States is 34 years old and will drive approximately 10 miles to surf, spending approximately $40 per session. The United States has the largest share of the surfing industry, accounting for 49% of total sales on average each year. The average surfer in the United States earns $75,000. Locations with exceptional waves bring in large levels of activity form surfers, with Trestles surf break in San Diego, CA having an estimated economic value of $24 million. The average surfer in the United States is 34 years old and owns 4 different surfboards. Surfing contributes greatly to the U.S. economy with US- based surfers spending over $3 billion each year on their domestic surfing trips. The average surfer in the US will surf 108 times each year on average. Over 6 million people in the United States watch professional surfing on TV each year. There are 9 official surf schools in the United States. The Surf Industry Manufacturers Association (SIMA), reported that the United States Surf industry had grown from US$6.52 billion in 2004 to US$7.48 billion in 2006.

== Major competitions in the United States ==
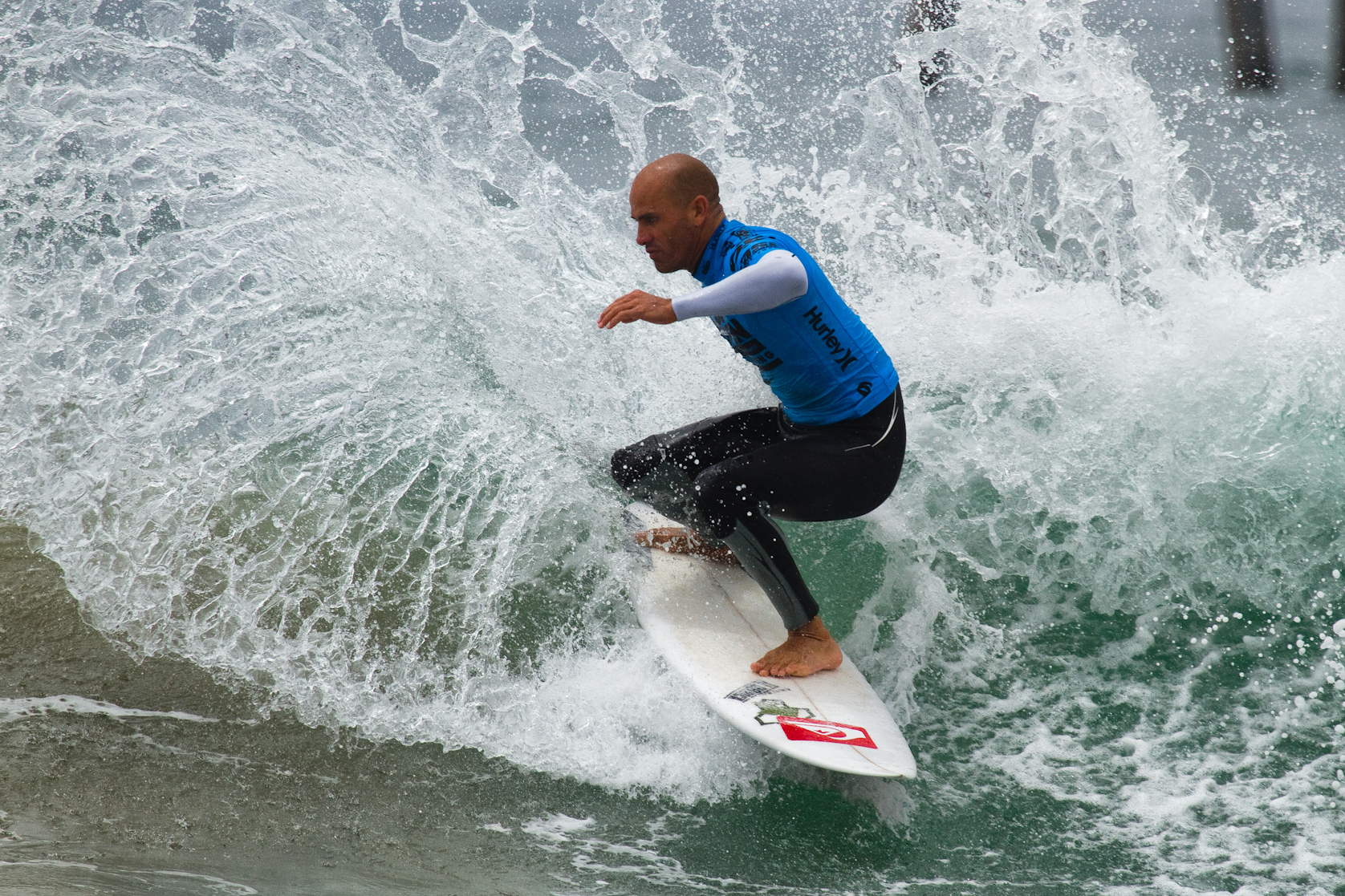
Kelly Slater competing at the 2011 US Open of Surfing in Huntington Beach, California

- Southeast Regional Surfing Championships - Smyrna Beach, Florida
- East Coast Surfing Championships - Virginia Beach, Virginia
- US Open of Surfing - Huntington Beach, California
- Triple Crown of Surfing - North Shore, Oahu, Hawaii
  - Reef Hawaiian Pro - North Shore, Oahu, Hawaii
  - O'Neill World Cup of Surfing - Pūpūkea, Oahu, Hawaii
  - Pipeline Masters - North Shore, Oahu, Hawaii
- The Eddie - Waimea Bay, Oahu, Hawaii
- Titans of Mavericks - Half Moon Bay, California
- USA Surfing Prime Junior Event - Camp Pendleton, California
- USA Surfing Prime Junior Event - Atlantic City, New Jersey
- ISA World Junior Surfing Championships - Huntington Beach, California
- USA Surfing Prime Junior Event - Nags Head, North Carolina
- USA Surfing Prime Junior Event - Dana Point, California
- Shoe City Pro - Santa Cruz, California
- USA Surfing Prime - Sebastian Inlet, Florida
- Jack's Pro - Huntington Beach, California
- USA Surfing Prime - Huntington Beach, California
- USA Surfing Prime - New Smyrna Beach, Florida
- USA Surfing Prime - San Onofre State Beach, California
- USA Surfing Prime - T-Street, San Clemente, California
- USA Surfing Championships - Oceanside, California
- USA Surfing Junior Olympic Surfing Championships - San Onofre State Beach, California
- USA Surfing Prime Junior Event - Long Beach, New York

== Big wave surfing ==
Big wave surfing involves riding a wave that is at least 6.2 meters (20 feet) high, on surfboards known as “guns” or “towboards” that are typically 1.82 to 3.65 meters (6.0 to 12.0 ft) long). These boards are thicker than regular surfboards enabling a rider to paddle fast enough to catch a wave. The boards have a round-pin tail allowing surfers to dig into large waves in order to carry out high-speed turns.

Big wave surfing in the United States dates back to the 1940s and 1950s, when surfers Woody Brown and Dickie Cross surfed a large swell at Sunset Beach in 1943. Dickie Cross did not survive. Greg Noll is widely renowned as being surfing's first big wave surfers, migrating to Hawaii in 1953 where he regularly surfed at Makaha, the largest wave surfed at the time. Greg Noll became one of the first people to surf Waimea bay in 1957. Greg Noll was credited with surfing the largest wave to date on December 4, 1969, at Makaha, estimated to be 9.14 meters (30.0 feet) high. Hawaiian Eddie Aikau transformed the boundaries of big wave surfing in the 1970s, winning the 1977 Duke Kahanamoku Invitational Surfing Championship. A memorial big wave contest in his name was held 1984 and has continued yearly until 2020. Jeff Clark was credited with surfing Mavericks for the first time in 1975, surfing the break alone for 15 years. He introduced the break to other surfers from Santa Cruz in 1992 and the break was on the cover of Surfer Magazine by 1992. In 1992 surfers Buzzy Kerbox and Laird Hamilton became pioneers in using a personal watercraft (jet ski) to pull other surfers into waves that were too big and fast moving to paddle into. The invention of tow-in surfing transformed big wave surfing, allowing surfers to ride waves bigger than ever previously ridden. The new discipline revolutionised big wave board size, allowing big wave surfers to use 2.13 meters (7.0 feet) boards that were easier to manoeuvre.

In 2005, the World Surf League introduced the Big Wave Awards across seven categories including:

- "XXL Biggest Wave"
- "Biggest Paddle Wave"
- "Tube of the Year"
- "Best Overall Performance"
- "Women’s Performance"
- "Wipeout Award"
- "Ride of the Year"

In 2009, surfboard shaper Gary Linden launched the Big Wave World Tour, which was taken over by the Association of Surfing Professionals in 2014.

U.S. Big Wave World Tour Title Holders:

- 2011: Peter Mel
- 2012: Greg Long
- 2015: Greg Long

Notable US Big Wave Surfing Spots:

- Cortes Bank, California
- Ghost Trees, California
- Mavericks, California
- The Wedge, California
- Nelscott Reef, Oregon

Big wave surfers conduct immense amounts of preparation in order to stay safe and perform at their absolute peak when riding large waves. Underwater rock running assists surfer to improve their lung capacity and prepare for being held underwater for long periods of time. Some of the world's highest ranked big wave surfers can hold their breath for up to 5 minutes. Yoga assists big wave surfers to stay flexible, and to use air more efficiently.

== U.S. World Title holders ==
Men

- 1968: Fred Hemmings
- 1970: Rolf Aurness
- 1972: James Blears
- 1974: Reno Abellira
- 1985/86: Tom Curren
- 1986/87: Tom Curren
- 1990: Tom Curren
- 1992: Kelly Slater
- 1994: Kelly Slater
- 1995: Kelly Slater
- 1996: Kelly Slater
- 1997: Kelly Slater
- 1998: Kelly Slater
- 2000: Sunny Garcia
- 2001: C.J. Hobgood
- 2002: Andy Iorns
- 2003: Andy Irons
- 2004: Andy Irons
- 2005: Kelly Slater
- 2006: Kelly Slater
- 2008: Kelly Slater
- 2010: Kelly Slater
- 2011: Kelly Slater

Women

- 1965: Joyce Hoffman
- 1966: Joyce Hoffman
- 1968: Margo Godfrey
- 1970: Sharon Webber
- 1972: Sharon Webber
- 1982: Debbie Beaham
- 1983/84: Kim Mearig
- 1984/85: Freida Zamba
- 1985/86: Freida Zamba
- 1986/87: Freida Zamba
- 1988: Frieda Zamba
- 1994: Lisa Andersen
- 1995: Lisa Andersen
- 1996: Lisa Andersen
- 1997: Lisa Andersen
