= North Shore (Oʻahu) =

Coast of Oʻahu

Coordinates: 21.6197°N 158.0856°W

North Shore Hawaii filmed with a drone

The North Shore of Oʻahu is a coastal area between Kaʻena Point and Kahuku. Its largest town is Haleʻiwa.

This area is best known for its massive waves, attracting big wave surfers from all around the world.

== Surfing ==
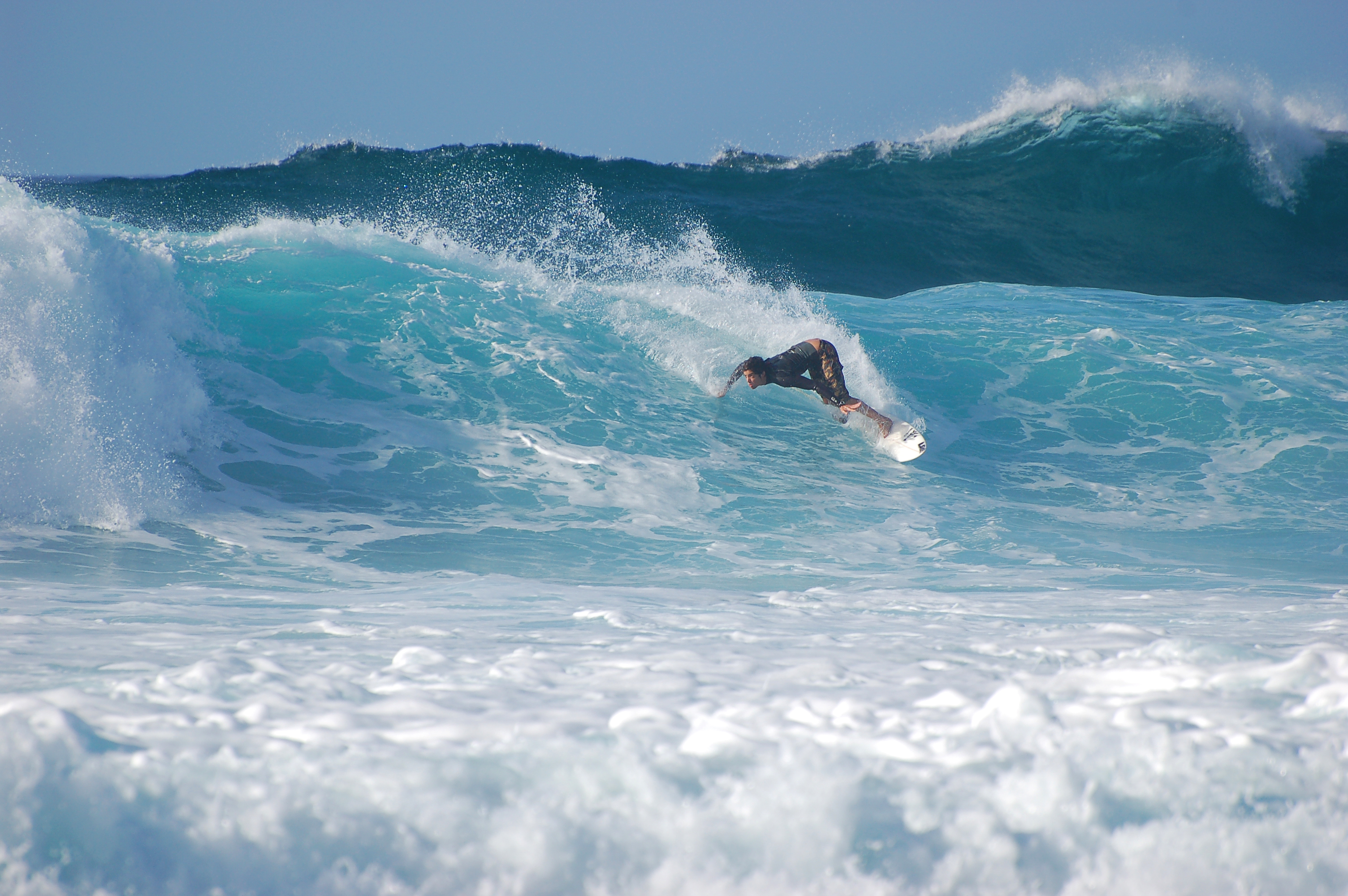
A surfer navigating a wave during an amateur competition at the North Shore's Banzai Pipeline

The northern hemisphere winter months on the North Shore see a concentration of surfing activity, taking advantage of swells originating in the stormy North Pacific. Notable surfing spots include Waimea Bay and Sunset Beach.

Banzai Pipeline, located at Ehukai Beach, is the most famous surfing spot on the North Shore and is consistently ranked one of the top surf spots in the world. It is a prime spot for competitions due to its close proximity to the beach, giving spectators, judges, and photographers a great view.

The North Shore is considered to be the surfing mecca of the world. Every December, the area hosts three competitions, which make up the Triple Crown of Surfing. The three men's competitions are the Hawaiian Pro, the O'Neill World Cup of Surfing, and the Billabong Pipeline Masters. The Pipe Masters was founded in 1971 and is regarded as the sport's top surfing contest. The three women's competitions are the Hawaiian Pro, the Roxy Pro Sunset, and the Billabong Pro on the neighboring island of Maui.

Waimea Bay hosts the Quiksilver Big Wave Invitational in Memory of Eddie Aikau. This is an exclusive competition that participants must be invited to. The competition has a scheduled window of dates each winter, however the competition has a minimum requirement of consistent, 20-foot (6.1 m) waves. Therefore, the competition is not held every year.

Although the North Shore is known for its large winter surf, there are a number of surf schools that teach a beginner the basics of surfing in coves that are protected from the larger waves.

== Television and film ==
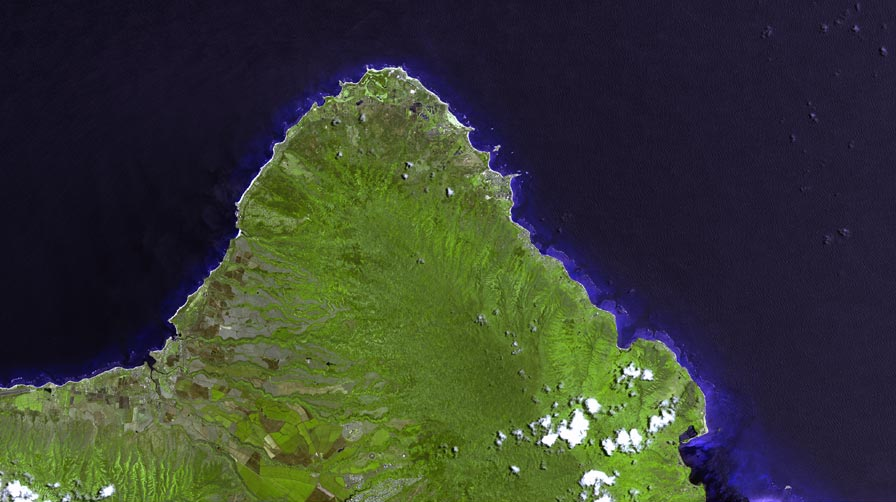
A satellite image of the North Shore

Due to its natural environment, proximity to Honolulu, and large waves, the North Shore is a popular area for filming.

The documentary film Bustin' Down the Door (2008) chronicles the rise of professional surfing in the early 1970s.

The Fox Network TV show North Shore was filmed there. ABC's Lost was filmed almost entirely on O'ahu, with much of it filmed on the North Shore, including in the area of Turtle Bay.

The North Shore was also the setting for the movies Ride the Wild Surf (1964), North Shore (1987), Blue Crush (2002), The Big Bounce (2004), and Forgetting Sarah Marshall (2008), as well as being fictionalized for the animated film Surf's Up.

Since December 2015 Hale'iwa and Pupukea have been the setting for the popular German reality TV show Die Reimanns, portraying the life of the Reimann family on their lush estate in Sunset Hills.

== Accommodation ==
The North Shore only houses one large commercial hotel, the Turtle Bay Resort, which also has two world-class golf courses designed by Arnold Palmer and George Fazio. Other accommodations are available in privately run condos, house rentals, and a youth hostel.

== Activities ==
While the North Shore is most famous for its surfing, there are a number of other popular activities on the North Shore including hiking, scuba diving, shark cage diving, surfing lessons, snorkeling, food trucks, foilboard, shopping, shave ice, dolphin tours, etc.

== Floods and beach erosion ==
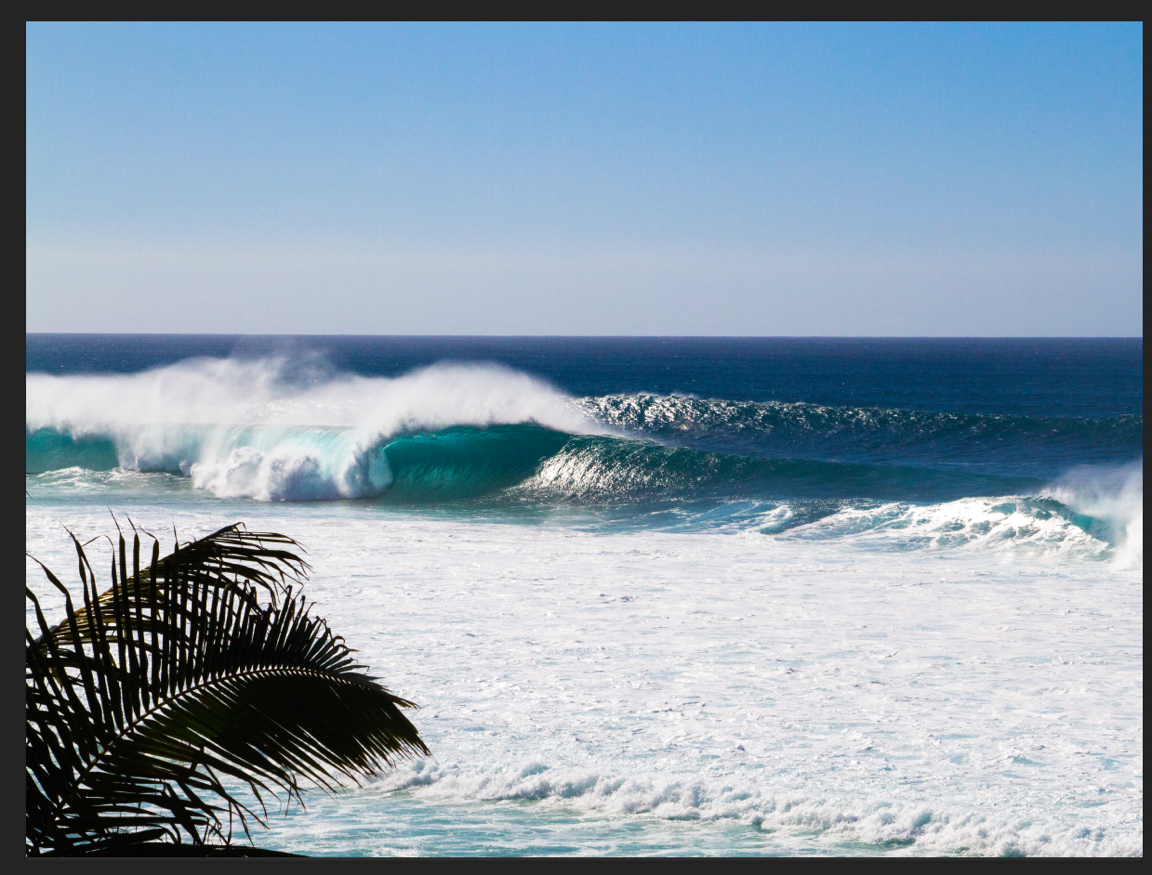
A set of waves coming in at Banzai Pipeline

The surf during the winter months regularly cause flooding along the North Shore, which may lead to temporary closure of Kamehameha Highway, erosion of some beaches, and take a toll on oceanfront homes.

North Shore is known for its extreme high surf in the winter season, starting around early November and possibly lasting to as long as June or July. Waves around this time are around 16 feet on average as measured from top to bottom of the waves' "face" -- the side of the wave that faces the shore. However, during the peak of the season, these waves can rise to around 45 to even 60 feet in size. Because of this extreme size and power that occurs every winter, coastal erosion increases and can pose a great threat to houses along the shoreline.

Moreover, these intense swells also cause the tide to rise to unusually high levels, further contributing to coastal erosion and also leading to major flooding throughout the North Shore. These floods can disrupt coastal wetlands, putting important ecosystems in danger and threatening their habitat. It can also greatly damage business and economy in the North Shore, especially in Haleiwa, as it can damage shop interiors, merchandise, and force certain businesses to close.

Although the majority of the North Shore’s coastal erosion is caused by the extreme surf during the winter season, there are many other factors that contribute to erosion such as climate change and rising sea levels. Climate change, referring to a change in the usual weather patterns and temperatures, often results in rising sea levels because of thermal expansion in the water. As our ocean waters continue to get hotter due to climate change, it expands resulting in the rising sea levels.

From 1950 to 2015, ocean temperatures rose by 1.2 degrees Fahrenheit. Because Earth's oceans are so massive, this is extremely significant. This change in temperature has led to more than 6 inches of sea level rise, causing on average a 233% increase in tidal flooding across the U.S. Higher seas amplify the effects of storms, hurricanes, rainstorms, and high tide, increasing the significance of these events. However, the majority of this rise in sea level occurred in the last 20 years because the rate of sea level rise is accelerating, with levels rising about one inch every eight years, and that rate is expected to continue accelerating.

As for Hawai’i specifically, the speed at which the sea levels are rising has increased, with levels rising as much as one inch every four years. Scientists expect sea levels to continue rising, forecasting that in the next twelve years, the sea level will rise by another six inches depending on how fast the ocean warms and the ice melts. This combination of a constant gradual rise in sea levels, climate change, extreme surf, susceptibility to storms, floods, hurricanes, and high tides causes a great level of coastal erosion that can put homeowners on the shoreline at extremely high risk. Moreover, this erosion can permanently change the beaches and surf breaks on the North Shore because of the severe amount of land lost.

== Communities ==
- Haleiwa
- Kahuku
- Mokuleia
- Pupukea
- Waialua
- Waimea Bay

== Notable residents ==
- Owl Chapman, surfer and surfboard shaper
- Darrick Doerner, surfer
- Jim Evans, artist
- John John Florence, professional surfer
- Brian Grazer, Academy Award-winning film and television producer
- Bruce Irons, professional surfer
- Jack Johnson, folk rock singer-songwriter
- Samuel Kamakau, historian
- Stanley Kennedy Sr., founder of Hawaiian Airlines
- Jamie O'Brien, professional surfer
- Frederick Patacchia, professional surfer
- Makua Rothman, professional surfer
- Arto Saari, professional skateboarder and photographer
- Paul Theroux, American travel writer and novelist
- Butch Van Artsdalen, surfer
- Carol Philips, Bodyboarder
- Tamayo Perry, surfer, lifeguard and actor
