= Gary Elkerton =

Australian surfer

Gary Elkerton (born 21 August 1964), known as Kong is an Australian surfer, three time world masters champion (2000–01, 2003), three time world professional runner-up (1987, 1990, 1993), twice Hawaiian Triple Crown champion (1987, 1989) and Australian amateur champion (1984). He is regarded as an iconic big-wave rider and is highly respected by his peers for his unique, powerful surfing style. In 2009, Gary was inducted into the Australian Surfing Hall of Fame.

== Early life ==
Elkerton was born in Ballina, northern New South Wales, the first child of Keith and Joan. The Elkertons owned a prawn (shrimp) fishing trawler which ranged from Karumba in the Gulf of Carpentaria, down the length of the Great Barrier Reef to the river ports of northern NSW. Gary took his first steps on the deck of the boat and was mostly home schooled at sea during his early years, despite short-lived, failed attempts at conventional education.

Elkerton's first surf was in Kingscliff in NSW at age nine. Thanks to an innate sense of balance acquired by growing up on a trawler, he was able to stand and turn immediately, thus by-passing the usual learning processes. His surfboard joined a mini-motocross bike in the hold of the family boat and both were used fanatically whenever there was opportunity in various ports of call.

After the arrival of his younger siblings, David and Bernadette, his parents opted to set up home in a location that provided safe, permanent anchorage for their prawning business. Mooloolaba on Queensland's Sunshine Coast was selected. The family home was a caravan in a beachside trailer park not far from the wharves. Eleven-year-old Elkerton had direct access to the rolling waves of a small secluded bay ten metres from his front door. Upon enrolling in grade six at nearby Mooloolaba Primary School, he was given the nickname 'King Kong' in reference to his large frame. In time, this was shortened to 'Kong'. The beach the Elkertons lived beside became known as 'Kong's Cove'.

Elkerton joined the local boardriders club – North Shore Boardriders – and was soon making an impression in contests with his unusually powerful technique. High School was routinely skipped in favour of surfing. Eventually, he was suspended from Maroochydore High School for inveterate truancy, upon which Keith Elkerton insisted that his fourteen-year-old son commence full-time work as a deckhand aboard the trawler. Gary spent the next two and half years diving from the trawler deck and surfing alone on the shark-infested, remote open ocean waves of the Great Barrier Reef and Queensland's isolated off-shore sand islands. By 1980, he had achieved significant success as a competitive junior surfer during his breaks from the trawler, so much so that he won his first of several Queensland Titles. Encouraged by sponsorships from emerging surf labels Quiksilver and Rip Curl, and acknowledging his less than dedicated performance as a prawn trawlerman; the Elkertons decided that Gary ought to pursue a career as a surfer, rather than remain in the family business.

== Early career ==
Elkerton won many prestigious amateur and pro-am titles around Australia throughout the years 1980–1984, including numerous Queensland Junior and Opens, the Cue Cola and JJJ Pro Juniors, The Jesus Classic Pro-Am and the Australian Open Amateur. 1978 World Champion, Wayne 'Rabbit' Bartholomew, became a lifelong mentor, confidant and friend during the period. He also developed a close friendship with Quiksilver founder Al Green, who funded trips to Hawaii and Grajagan, Java, Indonesia (where an outside reef break was also dubbed "Kong’s"). Hawaiian film maker Jack McCoy's movie footage of Gary during these early surf trips and Quiksilver's advertising campaigns caused 'Kong' to gain notoriety for his matadorial bravado in big waves, his low body-torque power and his hard-partying antics on land.

Before he had started as a full-time professional on the ASP World Tour, Gary's 'Kong' promotional logo (a giant gorilla wielding a surfboard in a clenched fist) had quickly become synonymous with brash, explosive surfing, and a distinctively rebellious attitude to rules and societal norms. Kong was also well known for his personal excesses and his friendships with rock and pop musicians.

In both 1982 and 1983 he spent four months on Oahu, Hawaii, immersing himself into local culture, traditions and surfing lore. Thanks to introductions made by Quiksilver's Al Green, Jeff Hakman and Mike Miller, Elkerton and his best friend James 'Chappy' Jennings, were assisted by many Hawaiian locals such as Mickey Neilsen, David Kahanamoku, Darrick Doerner and others, in acclimatising to the island's fearsome surf breaks. This early tutorage accounts for Gary's later successes at Waimea Bay, Banzai Pipeline and - in particular - his renown at Sunset Beach.

Elkerton the competitor was driven by the need to be world champion. His intent was to claim a World Amateur Title before embarking as a full-time professional on the ASP Pro Tour. Injury in 1982 and the failure of foreigners to impact the 1984 World Amateur Titles in California disrupted the plan; so he joined the Pro Tour halfway through the '84 season, not as World Amateur Champion, but as a rookie with the highest possible profile.

== Professional career ==
Elkerton's 12 years on the ASP Pro Tour were characterised by dramatic highs and lows. A fixture in the world's top five ranked surfers, he was World Title runner up three times ('87, '90, '93). In '87 he was beaten to the World Title in the last event of the year by fellow Australian Damien Hardman at Sydney's North Steyne beach on a technical interference call. In '90, Elkerton was denied a chance to challenge California's Tom Curren for the World Title in the last event at Sunset Beach, due to an interference (drop-in) by Hawaii's Michael Ho at the penultimate event, the Pipeline Masters. In '93 an epic, year long duel for the World Title between Gary and Ho's brother, Derek, ended with a close victory for the Hawaiian in one of the last heats of the year. The closeness, controversy and tumult attached to these disappointments earned him the moniker 'best surfer never to have won the World Title'.

However, disappointment was balanced by significant achievement. Elkerton won Pro Tour events all around the globe, but his legacy was made in Hawaii. His second place behind the immortal Mark Richards at the 1986 Billabong Pro held at thirty foot Waimea Bay (and also at Sunset Beach) is regarded as one of the best all-time ASP contests. He was also the first non-Hawaiian to win the Hawaiian Triple Crown series (twice, '86 and '89) and is the only professional surfer to have won two consecutive events at Sunset Beach (the Hardrock Café Pro and the Billabong Pro, '87). He was also Pipeline Masters champion in '89.

In 1987, a split with longtime sponsor Quiksliver and a decision to separate himself from his image as an irreverent party animal, saw Elkerton make a concerted effort to drop the nickname 'Kong'. He persisted in his attempts to divorce himself from his alter-ego, even issuing press releases and legal requests. Eventually, he embraced the reality that the surfing fraternity and the broader sports community would always think of him affectionately as 'Kong'.

Until his retirement from the Pro Tour in at the conclusion of the 1996 season, Elkerton was considered a perennial favourite to win contests in large or powerful waves. His final Tour highlight was at Grajagan in '96. He beat superstar Kelly Slater in the semi-final by scoring a perfect ten-point ride.

In 2000, Elkerton at last claimed a World Title by beating many of his career rivals in the World Masters contest in Lafetania, France. He defended his World Title successfully in '01 (Bundoran, Ireland) and '03 (Makaha, Oahu, Hawaii).

== Personal life ==
Elkerton met local fashion model, Pascale Roby in Lacanau, France in 1984. The couple married in 1987 and were divorced in 2000. From 1986 to 2005, Gary resided in either Lacanau or Seignosse, France. He has now returned to where it all began for him and he is currently living where he calls 'home' Alexandra Headland on the Sunshine Coast, Queensland.

He is a motocross rider who competed in cross-boarding (surfing and snowboarding) events.

His surfing is recorded in movies such as Kong's Island, Mad Wax and The Performers I & II.

In his post-competition phase of life, Kong has numerous business interests. He retains deep involvement with surfing through his role as host of 'Kong' specialty surf tours and as a coach of elite surfers such as Bede Durbidge, and as a brand ambassador for Mt Woodgee Surfboards.

Elkerton has completed an autobiography with Gold Coast writer, Peter McGuinness. Kong: The Life & Times of a Surfing Legend is published by HarperCollins.
