= World Qualification Series (2009) =

World Qualification Series (WQS) is a surfing points competition for the honour of competing with the world's best surfers on the ASP World Tour. The WQS is sometimes referred to as 'The Grind' or simply the 'QS' by competitors.

== History ==
The WQS was introduced in 1992 as a feeder competition to what was then called the WCT (World Championship Tour). The top scoring fifteen surfers on the WQS replaced the lowest scoring seventeen from the WCT on the following year's tour.

== 2009 Competition ==
=== Event 1: O'Neill Sebastian Inlet Pro (4*) ===
Jan 12 - Jan 18

Winner: Nathaniel Curran (United States)

=== Event 2: Copa Movistar (2*) ===
Jan 23 - Jan 25

Winner: Rafael Pereira (Venezuela)

=== Event 3: Hang Loose Pro (5*) ===
Feb 09 - Feb15

Winner: Bruno Santos (Brazil)

=== Event 4: MR Pro (2*) ===
Mar 18 - Mar 22

Winner: Travis Logie (South Africa)

=== Event 5: O'Neill Coldwater Classic - Tasmania (6*) ===
Mar 23 - Mar 29

Winner : Jordy Smith (South Africa)

=== Event 6: Van's Pier Classic (2*) ===
Mar 25 - Mar 29

Winner : Mike Losness (United States)

=== Event 7: Drug Aware Pro (6P*) ===
Mar 29 - Apr 05

Winner : Daniel Ross(Australia)

=== Event 8: Vendee Surf Pro (5*) ===
Apr 06 - Apr 12

Winner : Joan Duru (France)

=== Event 9: Goanna Pro (1*) ===
Apr 10 - Apr 12

CANCELLED

=== Event 10: Quiksilver Pro Durban (6P*) ===
Apr 19 - Apr 26

Winner: Andre Jadson (Brazil)

=== Event 11: Estoril Coast Pro (6*) ===
Apr 21 - Apr 26

Winner: Alejo Muniz (Brazil)

=== Event 12: 6.0 Lower's Pro (6P*) ===
Apr 28 - May 02

Winner : Fredrick Pattacchia (Hawaii)

=== Event 13: O'Neill Coldwater Classic - Scotland (6P*) ===
Apr 29 - May 06

Winner : Adam Melling (Australia)

=== Event 14: Lizzard Nandos Surf Pro (1*) ===
May 14 - May 17

Winner : Royden Bryson (South Africa)

=== Event 15: Macy's E'Series - Sandy Beach, Oahu (1*) ===
May 12 - May 17

Winner : TJ Barron (Hawaii)

=== Event 16: Arica Pro Challenge (3*) ===
Jun 02 - Jun 07

Winner : Gabriel Villarán (Peru)

=== Event 17: SriLankan Airlines Pro (6P*) ===
Jun 08 - Jun 14

Winner : Owen Wright (Australia)

=== Event 18: O'Neill Coldwater Classic - South Africa (6P*) ===
Jun 16 - Jun 24

Winner : Blake Thornton (Australia)

=== Event 19: The Mr Price Pro (6*) ===
Jun 28 - Jul 05

=== Event 20: Super Bock Pro (1*) ===
Jul 09 - Jul 12

=== Event 21: Maresia Surf International (6*) ===
Jul 07 - Jul 12

Winner : Gabriel Medina (Brazil)

=== Event 22: Macy's E'Series - Ala Moana Bowls, Oahu (1*) ===
Jul 07 - Jul 12

=== Event 23: Billabong ECO Surf Festival (5*) ===
Jul 14 - Jul 19

=== Event 24: Local Motion Guaraja Surf Pro (5*) ===
Jul 21 - Jul 26

=== Event 25: US Open of Surfing (6*) ===
Jul 17 - Jul 26

=== Event 26: Tahana Pro (6*) ===
Jul 28 - Aug 02

=== Event 27: TBA - Puerto Escondido, Mexico (4*) ===
Jul 29 - Aug 02

=== Event 28: Relentless Boardmasters - Newquay, England (5*) ===
Aug 5 - Aug 9

=== Event 29: Soöruz Lacanau Pro (6*) ===
Aug 18 - Aug 23 30th Anniversary of the Lacanau Pro and good conditions this year. Surf, concerts, events scheduled. Check out the video for a summary of the event http://vimeo.com/6994555

=== Event 30: Acores Pro (6*) ===
Aug 25 - Aug 30

=== Event 31: Japan Pro Open (3*) ===
Sep 01 - Sep 06

=== Event 32: TBA - Zarautz, Basque Country (5*) ===
Sep 01 - Sep 06

=== Event 33: Gatorade Surf Classic (3*) ===
Sep 04 - Sep 06

=== Event 34: Vans El Ponto Loco (2*) ===
Sep 09 - Sep 12

=== Event 35: Sunshine Surfmasters (1*) ===
Sep 10 - Sep 13

=== Event 36: TBA - Pantin, Spain (5*) ===
Sep 08 - Sep 13

=== Event 37: Buondi Billabong Pro (6*) ===
Sep 15 - Sep 20

=== Event 38: Murasaki Pro Kitaizumi (2*) ===
Sep 16 - Sep 22

=== Event 39: Oakley NB Pro (2*) ===
Sep 22 - Sep 27

=== Event 40: Rio Surf Pro International (6*) ===
Oct 05 - Oct 11

=== Event 41: Hyuga Pro (2*) ===
Oct 07 - Oct 12

=== Event 42: Onbongo Pro Surfing (6*) ===
Oct 13 - Oct 18

=== Event 43: Squalo Mexican Surf Fiesta (1*) ===
Oct 16 - Oct 18

=== Event 44: La Caja de Canarias - Ocean & Earth Pro (5*) ===
Oct 19 - Oct 25

=== Event 45: O'Neill Coldwater Classic - Canada (6*) ===
Oct 25 - Oct 31

=== Event 46: Santa Pro (6P*) ===
Oct 30 - Nov 07

Winner : Drew Courtney (Australia)

=== Event 47: O'Neill Coldwater Classic - California (6P*) ===
Nov 02 - Nov 08

=== Event 48: Xcel Pro (4*) ===
Oct 26 - Nov 10

=== Event 49: PXM International Vans Pro (3*) ===
Nov 11 - Nov 15

=== Event 50: TBA - Papua New Guinea (2*) ===
Nov 17 - Nov 22

=== Event 51: Reef Hawaiian Pro (6P*) ===
Nov 12 - Nov 24

=== Event 52: O'Neill World Cup of Surfing (6P*) ===
Nov 25 - Dec 06
