= Triple Crown of Surfing =

Annual professional surfing event in Hawaii

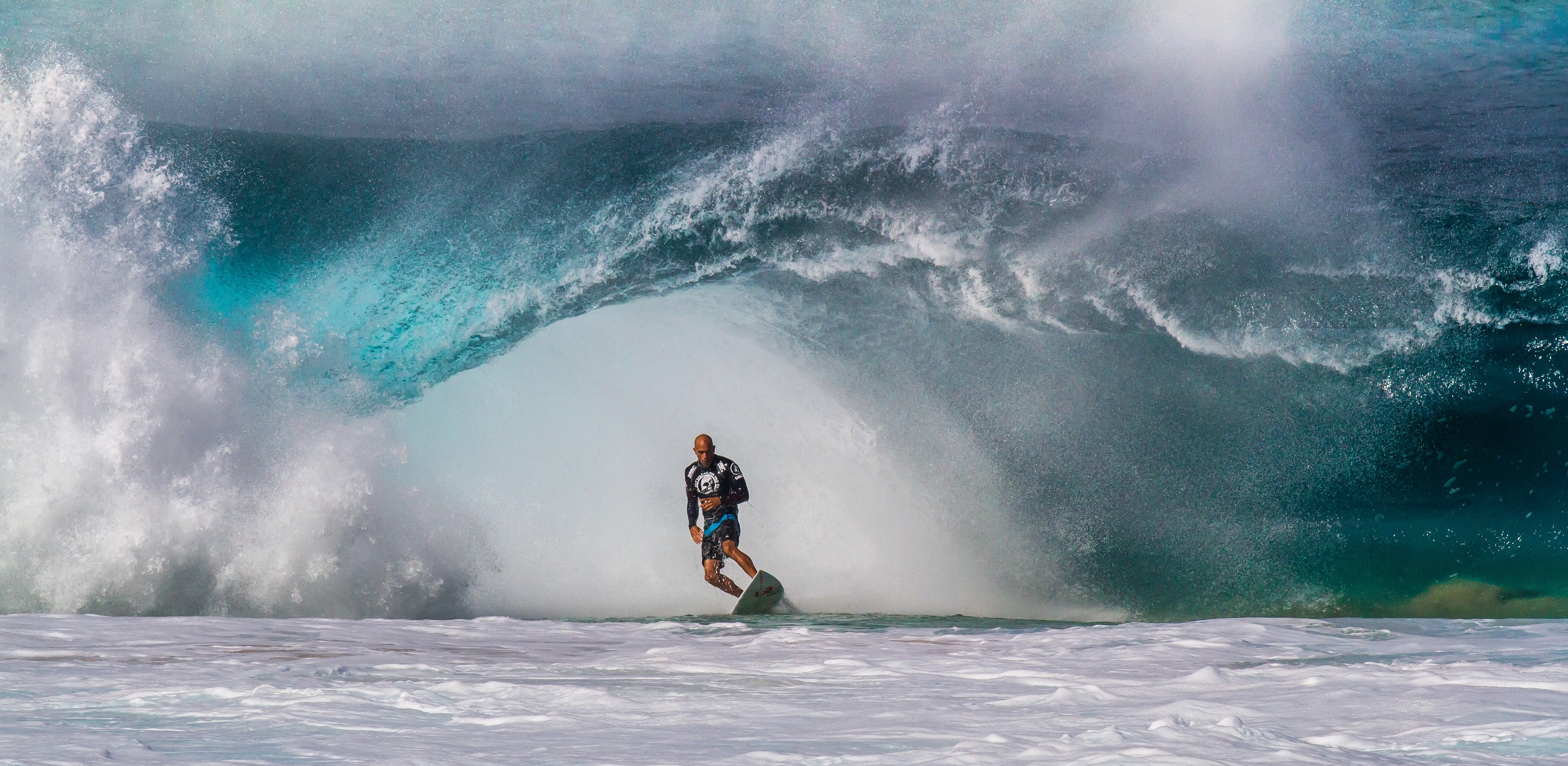

The Triple Crown of Surfing is a specialty series of professional surfing events that have been held annually since 1983 on the North Shore of Oahu, a coastline whose winter swells can reach 50 feet (15 m) in height.

The Triple Crown was founded by former World Champion (1968) Fred Hemmings, and Randy Rarick, who produced the Triple Crown events. The Series came under Vans' ownership in 1998.

The three venues of Haleiwa, Sunset, and Pipeline are the last three major events of the professional surfing season; the Pipe Masters being the final event of the World Surf League Championship Tour up until 2020 when it became the first event of the 2020-21 wraparound season in December 2020.

In 2020, under challenges of the global COVID-19 pandemic, the series went fully digital. Surfers had from December 21, 2020, to January 15, 2021, to upload their two best video clips from each of the three venues. The women's division returned to Pipeline. The digital Vans Triple Crown of Surfing awarded individual location titles for Haleiwa, Sunset and Pipeline, as well as overall Vans Triple Crown champion titles to the top performing man and woman across all three locations, with a total prize purse of $200,000 split equally among men and women. There was also a digital Fan Vote title, for fan favorites, for the first time. The Pipeline event is not to be confused with the 2020 Pipeline Masters tournament that was held to start the 2020-21 wraparound season.

The events are:

- The Hawaiian Pro at Haleiwa Ali'i Beach Park (Nov. 12 - Nov. 24)
- The World Cup of Surfing at Sunset Beach (Nov. 25 - Dec. 6)
- The Pipeline Masters at Ehukai Beach Park (in Pūpūkea, and home to the Banzai Pipeline) (Dec. 8 - Dec. 20).

In addition to individual event champions, the Vans Triple Crown of Surfing crowns an overall champion each year. This goes to the surfer who has performed best across all three competitions.

== Men's & Women's Triple Crown Champions ==
2023	Finn McGill	Hawaii	Carissa Moore	Hawaii
2022	Finn McGill	Hawaii	Carissa Moore	Hawaii
2021	John John Florence	Hawaii	Carissa Moore	Hawaii
2020	John John Florence	Hawaii	Carissa Moore	Hawaii
2019	Kelly Slater	USA	No Women's Division	
2018	Jessé Mendes	Brazil	No Women's Division	
2017	Griffin Colapinto	USA	No Women's Division	
2016	John John Florence	Hawaii	No Women's Division	
2015	Gabriel Medina	Brazil	No Women's Division	
2014	Julian Wilson	Australia	No Women's Division	
2013	John John Florence	Hawaii	No Women's Division	
2012	Sebastian Zietz	Hawaii	No Women's Division	
2011	John John Florence	Hawaii	No Women's Division	
2010	Joel Parkinson	Australia	Stephanie Gilmore	Australia
2009	Joel Parkinson	Australia	Stephanie Gilmore	Australia
2008	Joel Parkinson	Australia	Stephanie Gilmore	Australia
2007	Bede Durbidge	Australia	Megan Abubo	Hawaii
2006	Andy Irons	Hawaii	Sofia Mulanovich	Peru
2005	Andy Irons	Hawaii	Chelsea Hedges	Australia
2004	Sunny Garcia	Hawaii	No Women's Division	
2003	Andy Irons	Hawaii	Keala Kennelly	Hawaii
2002	Andy Irons	Hawaii	Neridah Falconer	Australia
2001	Myles Padaca	Hawaii	No Women's Division	
2000	Sunny Garcia	Hawaii	Heather Clarke	South Africa
1999	Sunny Garcia	Hawaii	Trudy Todd	Australia
1998	Kelly Slater	USA	Layne Beachley	Australia
1997	Michael Rommelse	Australia	Layne Beachley	Australia
1996	Kaipo Jaquias	Hawaii	No Women's Division	
1995	Kelly Slater	USA	No Women's Division	
1994	Sunny Garcia	Hawaii	No Women's Division	
1993	Sunny Garcia	Hawaii	No Women's Division	
1992	Sunny Garcia	Hawaii	No Women's Division	
1991	Tom Carroll	Australia	No Women's Division	
1990	Derek Ho	Hawaii	No Women's Division	
1989	Gary Elkerton	Australia	No Women's Division	
1988	Derek Ho	Hawaii	No Women's Division	
1987	Gary Elkerton	Australia	No Women's Division	
1986	Derek Ho	Hawaii	No Women's Division	
1985	Michael Ho	Hawaii	No Women's Division	
1984	Derek Ho	Hawaii	No Women's Division	
1983	Michael Ho	Hawaii	No Women's Division	
