= Sunny Garcia Surfing =

2001 video game

- Developer: Krome Studios
- Publisher: Ubi Soft
- Platform: PlayStation 2
- Release: NA: October 23, 2001; EU: February 1, 2002
- Genre: Sports
- Modes: Single-player, multiplayer

Sunny Garcia Surfing is an extreme sports video game endorsed by surfer Sunny Garcia, developed by Krome Studios, published by Ubi Soft, and released for PlayStation 2 in 2001.

== Reception ==
Reception

Aggregate score
Aggregator	Score
Metacritic	61/100

Review scores
Publication	Score
AllGame	2/5
Computer and Video Games	4/10
GamePro	3/5
GameRevolution	C−
GameSpot	5.9/10
GameZone	7.9/10
IGN	7/10
Official U.S. PlayStation Magazine	3.5/5

The game received "mixed" reviews according to the review aggregation website Metacritic.
