= Darrick Doerner =

Surfing pioneer

Darrick Doerner is a big wave pioneer in the sport of tow-in surfing, in which personal water craft are used to tow surfers into large surf. Also known by the nickname, Double D, Doerner is an accomplished big wave surfer himself.

Doerner is an 'all around waterman' in the ocean, from surf, big wave tow-surfing, paddle, stand up paddling, windsurfing, anything with water, he's been a part of its progression at some point. In the late-1960s and 1970s he grew up in California. He then moved to the Big Island of Hawai'i for his senior year of high school.

== Career ==
From 1975 to 1996 he worked with Eddie Aikau, Mark Cunningham, Terry Ahue and Brian Keaulana. He learned from other people such as Peter Cole, Greg Noll, Dick Brewer, Reno Abellira, James Jones, Owl Chapman, Sam Hawk, Tiger Espere and Michael Ho. Darrick life guarded for over twenty years on the North Shore. His approach was focused on water safety which gave him the important skills to negotiate big water safely and big wave surfing, . He has set the basic protocol for dealing with a wipeout and the inevitable rescue in large waves of this stature. Doerner trained in California with Shawn Alladio of K38 for rescue boat technical handling. Doerner was the preferred boating driver/partner of Dave Kalama and Laird Hamilton beginning in the 1990s.

In 1996, Doerner left life guarding to become an ambassador to surfing. He worked with an apparel company and traveled around the world to teach surfing and to share his knowledge with others. Around that time, a group of friends and Doerner took their surfing to the next level, having already mastered small waves and heavy water. With the creation of tow-in surfing, the 'Strapped Crew' together facilitated a quantum leap in surfing, one of the biggest jumps in the history of the sport. Many growing pains were experienced with the advent of this new boating activity, safety being the most important aspect. The sport of tow surfing took off with the infusion of the growth of internet and DVD exposure.

== Career ==
Doerner worked in direct competition to the Hawaiian Water Patrol from 1978 to 2004, which was in charge of water safety for all North Shore surfing contests. Their role was to ensure the safety of all professional surfers in the treacherous waters of Hawaii. However, Doerner ran a competing water safety company, named "Designated Driver Incorporated." Darrick's water patrol work for films and TV shows include Big Wednesday, Baywatch, ER, The Big Bounce. Stunt double and surf coach for Patrick Swayze in Point Break (1991). Final "Bells Beach 50 Year Storm" surfing and wipe-out scene shot at Waimea Bay.

Stunt double for James Bond in Die Another Day (2002). Opening segment shot at Peahi, Maui with Dave Kalama, Laird Hamilton and cinematographer Don King.

== Filmography ==
- Point Break (Final Scene) (1991)
- Endless Summer II (1994)
- Wake-Up Call (1996)
- In God's Hands (1998)
- Radical Attitude (1999)
- Strapped (2002)
- Laird (2003)
- Step Into Liquid (2003)
- The Ride/The Day (2004 - Sundance Film Festival Film of the Year)
- Riding Giants (2004)
- All Aboard the Crazy Train (2006)
