= O'Neill World Cup of Surfing =

American professional surfing event

The O'Neill World Cup of Surfing is an event in professional surfing held annually at Pūpūkea (Sunset Beach) on Oahu in Hawaii.

The event attracts hundreds of elite surfers from around the world, and is known for its huge waves. It is the second tournament in the Triple Crown of Surfing.

== History ==
The first competition was held in 1975. Of the 22 surfers who have won the event, 7 went on to become world champions. This competition is the final stop of the 2010 Association of Surfing Professional Tour, and the ASPW Tour as well. Top performers of the event share a prize money that varies from year to year, along with points which go to the Triple Crown competition.

Brazil's Raoni Monteiro, 28, became the first South American male in 20 years to win the O'Neill World Cup of Surfing at Sunset Beach for 2010. Fabio Gouveria from South America won the title in 1991. Tyler Wright from Australia has won the Women's Cup twice, once when she was 16, and once when she was 19

In 2005, Jake Paterson from Australia won his second O'Neill World Cup of Surfing title. In 2006, native Hawaiian resident, Makuakai Rothman won the O'Neill World Cup of Surfing, and took home $125,000 in prize money. In 2009, the winner of O'Neill event received $20,000, and the most consistent performer across all three Van's events received a $50,000 bonus.

== Vans Triple Crown of Surfing ==
The O'Neill World Cup of Surfing is presented by Rockstar Energy Drink and is the second jewel of the Vans Triple Crown of Surfing.

The $740,000 Vans Triple Crown of Surfing consists of three different competitions held in Hawaii. They the Hawaiian Pro at Haleiwa Ali'i Beach Park, Nov 12–24, the O'Neill World Cup of Surfing at Sunset Beach, Nov.25-Dec.6, Billabong Pipeline Masters (men), at the Banzai Pipeline, Dec 8–20 and Billabong Pro Maui (women), Honolulu Bay, Maui, Dec 8–20 (WCT).

Not only do the winners receive up to $740,000 in prize money, but both the men's and women's Vans Triple Crown champions will receive a limited edition $25,000 Chevy Colorado truck. The men's champion will also receive a custom $10,000 Nixon watch.

The Vans Triple Crown of Surfing is considered to be a surfer's ultimate test. Each competition offers different challenges. CJ Hobgood from the US, scored highest in the men's O'Neil World Cup of Surfing in 2008.

The Vans Triple Crown of Surfing is made possible through the support of Op, Roxy, O'Neill, Rip Curl, Billabong, Surfing, Oahu's Turtle Bay Beach Resort, Hawaiian Airlines, G-Shock, the Honolulu Star-Bulletin, Fox Sports Net and Road Runner High Speed Online.

== Sunset Beach Plays a Vital Role in Women's Surfing History ==
Laura Blears changed the face of professional female surfing by competing in the all-male Smirnoff Pro competition in 1974 at Sunset Beach, Hawaii. After her appearance in Competition, women became a normal feature the competitions cumulating in Hawaii.

In 2010, Sunset Beach plays a vital role in women's professional surfing history when O'Neill sponsored the first elite women's World Tour Event. This event was the second jewel of the Vans Triple Crown of Surfing. The O'Neill Women's World cup of Surfing competition took place at Sunset Beach, Hawaii, November 24 – December 6 in 2010, and continues to take place year after year during that same time at Sunset Beach Hawaii. It is the next-to-last contest of the women's Championship Tour.

Randy Rarick is the executive director of the Vans Triple Crown of Surfing. He is extremely excited about the O'Neill Women's World Cup of Surfing event at Sunset Beach, and is even more excited about the future of women's surfing. The two surfers, Gilmore and Parkinson lead the Vans Triple Crown Title Race. The winning female athlete would take home $100,000 is prize money. The event determined the top 4 women for the final pipe showdown. After the event, the 2011 World Tour was decided in Sunset

== Women's 2010 Results ==
O'Neill Women's World Cup of Surfing 10 best wave scores
Number	Score	Competitor	Heat #	Round	Day
1	9.00	Carissa Moore	4	Quarters	2/Dec/2010
2	8.50	Sally Fitzgibbons	4	Round 1	24/Nov/2010
3	8.50	Malia Manuel	2	Quarters	2/Dec/2010
4	8.33	Stephanie Gilmore	1	Semis	2/Dec/2010
5	8.00	Tyler Wright	1	Semis	2/Dec/2010
6	7.83	Carissa Moore	4	Quarters	2/Dec/2010
7	7.70	Stephanie Gilmore	1	Semis	2/Dec/2010
8	7.67	Stephanie Gilmore	2	Round 1	24/Nov/2010
9	7.50	Melanie Bartels	3	Round 1	24/Nov/2010
10	7.37	Melanie Bartels	4	Quarters	2/Dec/2010

Heat # 1 Women's Final

Singlet Color	Place	Points	Name	From	Prize Money
Red	3	10.27	Stephanie Gilmore	AUS	$6,500
White	1	17.24	Tyler Wright	AUS	$12,000
Yellow	4	9.96	Sally Fitzgibbons	AUS	$6,000
Blue	2	11.43	Coco Ho	HAW	$7,000

Women's 10 Best Average Heat Points
Number	Total	Best	Competitor	Heat #	Round	%
1	16.83	2	Carissa Moore	4	Quarters	84.15%
2	16.03	2	Stephanie Gilmore	1	Semis	80.15%
3	15.67	2	Malia Manuel	2	Quarters	78.35%
4	14.83	2	Sally Fitzgibbons	4	Round 1	74.15%
5	14.50	2	Tyler Wright	1	Semis	72.50%
6	14.20	2	Melanie Bartels	4	Quarters	71.00%
7	14.00	2	Silvana Lima	1	Semis	70.00%
8	13.00	2	Malia Manuel	1	Semis	65.00%
9	12.94	2	Stephanie Gilmore	2	Quarters	64.70%
10	12.94	2	Silvana Lima	3	Round 1	64.70%

== 2010 Women's Wave Statistics ==
The O'Neill Women's World Cup of Surfing attracts elite female surfers from around the world. The competition is known for its big waves, and is the ultimate test. The competition takes days, so the conditions vary from day to day.

A total of 205 waves surfed in 12 heats ...
5 waves	Counted as Excellent
38 waves	Counted as Good
50 waves	Counted as Regular
60 waves	Counted as Poor

Statistics of tabulated waves A total of 95 waves that were used for tabulation ...
	5 waves counted	as Excellent
	34 waves counted	as Good
	33 waves counted	as Regular
	21 waves counted	as Poor

== Men's 2010 Results ==
10 Best Wave Scores
Number	Score	Name	Heat	Round	Day
1	9.57	Tyler Wright	1	Final	2/Dec/2010
2	8.87	Josh Kerr	1	Quarters	2/Dec/2010
3	8.67	Raoni Monteiro	6	Round of 32	2/Dec/2010
4	8.67	Rudy Palmboom	5	Round of 128	24/Nov/2010
5	8.60	Raoni Monteiro	3	Quarters	2/Dec/2010
6	8.50	Granger Larsen	2	Semis	2/Dec/2010
7	8.50	Adrian Buchan	1	Quarters	2/Dec/2010
8	8.50	John John Florence	3	Quarters	2/Dec/2010
9	8.33	Julian Wilson	4	Round of 64	1/Dec/2010
10	8.33	Joel Parkinson	14	Round of 96	1/Dec/2010

10 Best Average Heat Points
Number	Total	Best	Competitor	Heat #	Round	%
1	17.24	2	Tyler Wright	1	Final	86.20%
2	16.87	2	Josh Kerr	1	Quarters	84.35%
3	15.90	2	Granger Larsen	2	Semis	79.50%
4	15.83	2	Julian Wilson	4	Round of 64	79.15%
5	15.80	2	John John Florence	3	Quarters	79.00%
6	15.50	2	Adrian Buchan	1	Quarters	77.50%
7	15.50	2	Joel Parkinson	14	Round of 96	77.50%
8	15.37	2	Raoni Monteiro	3	Quarters	76.85%
9	15.34	2	Rudy Palmboom	5	Round of 128	76.70%
10	15.20	2	Raoni Monteiro	2	Semis	76.00%

== Men's 2010 Wave Statistics ==
A total of 962 waves surfed in 41 heats for the men's competition.

17 waves were Excellent

122 waves were Good

223 waves were Regular

247 waves were Poor

A total of 326 waves were used for tabulation ...
17 waves counted as Excellent
111 waves counted as Good
132 waves counted as Regular
60 waves counted as Poor

== Men's Results 2007 ==
FINAL RESULTS
Rank	Competitor	From	Prize Money
1st	Makuakai Rothman	Hawaii	$15,000
2nd	Leonardo Neves	Brazil	$7,500
3rd	Mick Fanning	Australia	$4,000
4th	Daniel Ross,	Australia	$3,000
