= Owl Chapman =

American surfer

Craig Elmer "Owl" Chapman is a surfer. He is considered one of the fathers of the short board revolution. He pioneered board riding with early designs on Oahu by Dick Brewer, including the minigun. The school of surf that Chapman originates from is different from the Australian and South Africans who are best known for Bustin' Down The Door. Their philosophy of western competitive traditions has been argued by other surf pioneers such as Gerry Lopez and Owl Chapman, as being respectful of the Hawaiian culture. Chapman, on the other hand, worked within the Hawaiian community, as a resident of the North Shore, to further the short board revolution.
