= Pūpūkea, Hawaii =

Census-designated place in Hawaii, United States

Pūpūkea
- Census-designated place
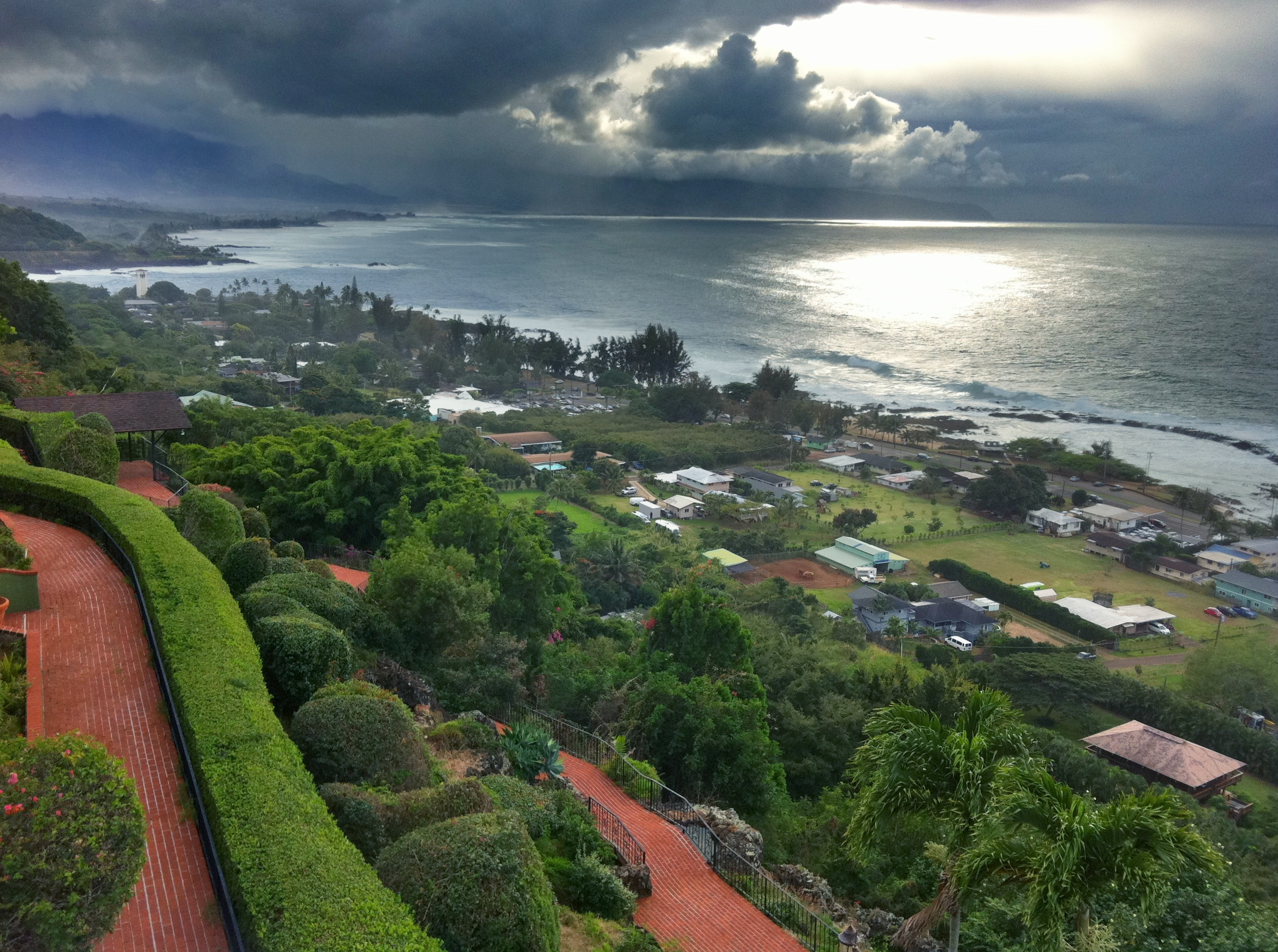
- View of Pūpūkea towards the ocean

- Location in Honolulu County and the state of Hawaii
- Coordinates: 21°40′11″N 158°2′58″W
- Country: United States
- State: Hawaii

Area
  - Total: 6.08 sq mi (15.75 km^{2})
  - Land: 3.44 sq mi (8.90 km^{2})
  - Water: 2.64 sq mi (6.85 km^{2})
- Elevation: 0 ft (0 m)

Population (2020)
  - Total: 5,130
  - Density: 1,492.4/sq mi (576.23/km^{2})
- Time zone: UTC-10 (Hawaii-Aleutian)
- ZIP code: 96712
- Area code: 808
- FIPS code: 15-66800
- GNIS feature ID: 1867261

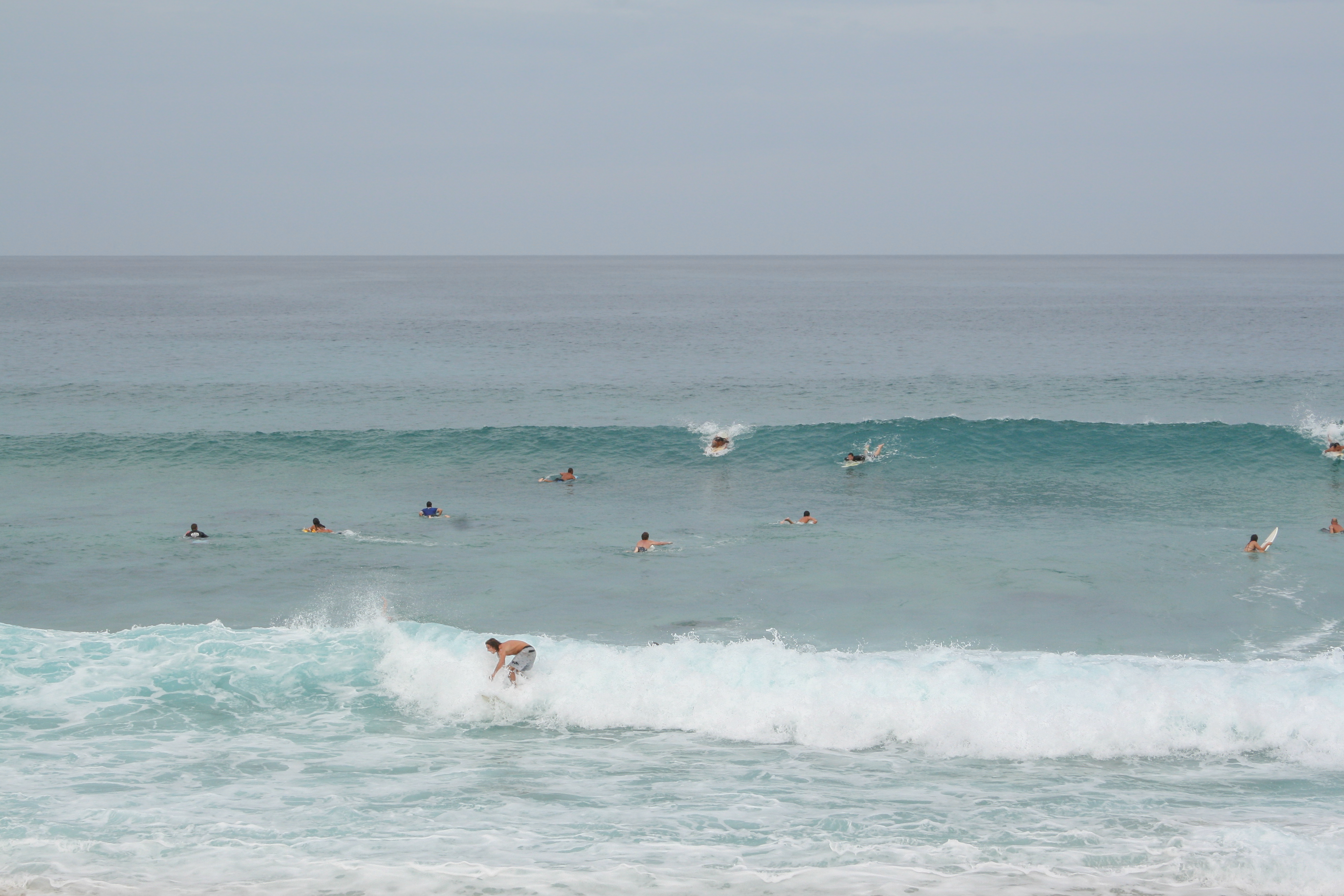
Surfers in Sunset Beach

Pūpūkea (Hawaiian pronunciation: [puːpuːˈkɛjə]) is a community and census-designated place (CDP) in the Koʻolauloa District on the island of Oʻahu, City & County of Honolulu, Hawaii, United States. In Hawaiian, pūpūkea means "white shell". As of the 2020 census, the CDP had a population of 5,130. The Koʻolauloa District ends at Waimea Bay, with the Waialua District extending south and westward.

Pūpūkea is a popular area on Oʻahu's North Shore for living and for visiting. The best known surfing sites of Velzyland, Sunset (at Sunset Beach Park), Kammieland, Pūpūkea, ʻEhukai, Pipeline (these latter two off adjacent ʻEhukai Beach Park and Banzai Beach) and lesser breaks are arrayed off this shore. Popular diving and snorkeling areas known as Three Tables and Sharks Cove are located at Pūpūkea Beach Park. At the southwest end of Pūpūkea is Waimea Bay, with one of the most popular beaches on the island forming the shore at Waimea Beach Park.

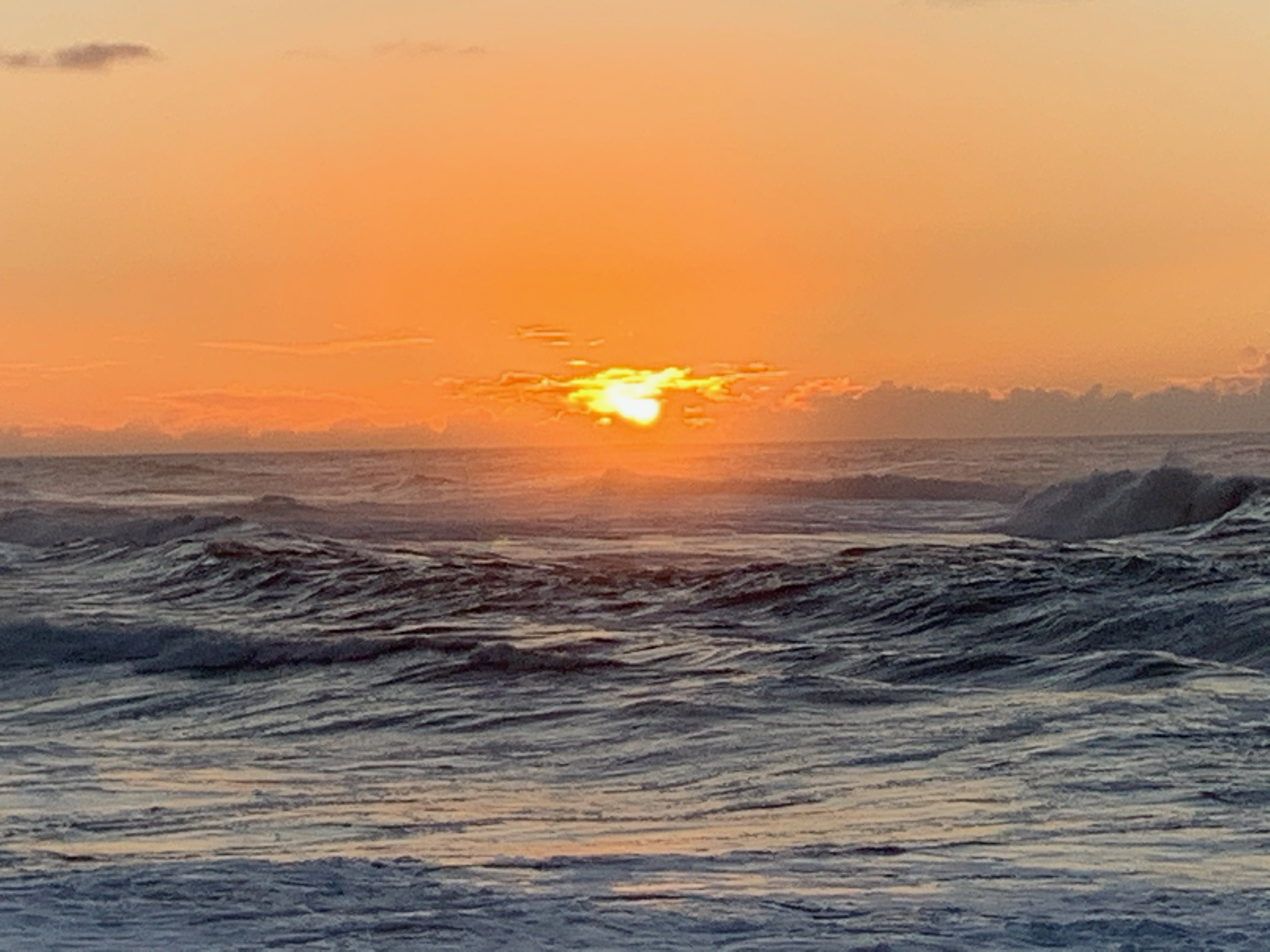
Sunset at Sunset Beach in Pūpūkea

Popular residential areas here include the beach lots at Sunset Beach and the uplands of Pūpūkea. As the properties in this area were subdivided in the 1950s and 60s and classified then as country, the lots in the uplands were all measured out in 1 acre or greater parcels. The biggest drawback to living in this part of the island, however, is the considerable driving distance of 37 miles (60 km) to Honolulu.

The U.S. postal code for Pūpūkea and the communities of Waialeʻe, Sunset Beach, Lihilani, Waimea, and Kawailoa is 96712.

== Geography ==
Pūpūkea is located at 21°40'11" North, 158°2'58" West (21.669740, -158.049349), along Kamehameha Highway (State Rte. 83) west to southwest from Kawela Bay and northeast from Haleʻiwa.

Due to its geographic location, this area gets three times the amount of rain per year Honolulu receives. It rains on average on 247 days a year with 54.7 inches of rainfall here, whereas it only rains on 89 days with 17.1 inches of rainfall annually in Honolulu.

According to the United States Census Bureau, the CDP has a total area of 6.1 square miles (16 km^{2}), of which 3.4 square miles (8.8 km^{2}) is land and 2.7 square miles (7.0 km^{2}) is water. The total area is 44.17% water, consisting of that portion of the Pacific Ocean (possibly with Waimea Bay) included in the CDP.

== Demographics ==
Historical population
Census	Pop.	Note	%±
2020	5,130		—
U.S. Decennial Census

As of the 2000 Census, there were 4,250 people, 1,455 households, and 937 families residing in the CDP. The population density was 1,250.5 inhabitants per square mile (482.8/km^{2}). There were 1,690 housing units at an average density of 497.2 per square mile (192.0/km^{2}). The racial makeup of the CDP was 55.95% White, 0.24% Black or African American, 0.66% Native American, 14.56% Asian, 6.52% Pacific Islander, 1.18% from other races, and 20.89% from two or more races. 8.38% of the population were Hispanic or Latino of any race.

There were 1,455 households, out of which 32.8% had children under the age of 18 living with them, 48.0% were married couples living together, 10.3% had a female householder with no husband present, and 35.6% were non-families. 18.7% of all households were made up of individuals, and 3.4% had someone living alone who was 65 years of age or older. The average household size was 2.92 and the average family size was 3.35.

In the CDP the population was spread out, with 23.6% under the age of 18, 10.1% from 18 to 24, 34.7% from 25 to 44, 24.3% from 45 to 64, and 7.3% who were 65 years of age or older. The median age was 34 years. For every 100 females there were 114.6 males. For every 100 females age 18 and over, there were 119.8 males.

The median income for a household in the CDP was $56,146, and the median income for a family was $62,375. Males had a median income of $41,015 versus $32,332 for females. The per capita income for the CDP was $25,682. 15.2% of the population and 11.4% of families were below the poverty line. Out of the total population, 15.8% of those under the age of 18 and 6.1% of those 65 and older were living below the poverty line.

== Education ==
The Hawaii Department of Education operates the public schools. Sunset Beach Elementary School is located in the CDP. Pupukea Schoolhouse is another educational option (non-DOE/public), starting in 2022 in upland Pupukea.
