= Hawaiian Pro =

Surfing competition

- Sport: Surfing
- Country: United States
- Most recent champion: (Australia) Joel Parkinson

The Hawaiian Pro is a surfing event held annually at Haleiwa, on the North Shore of Oahu, Hawaii. It is currently the first leg of the Triple Crown of Surfing.
