= Haleʻiwa, Hawaii =

Census-designated place in the United States

Haleʻiwa
- Census-designated place
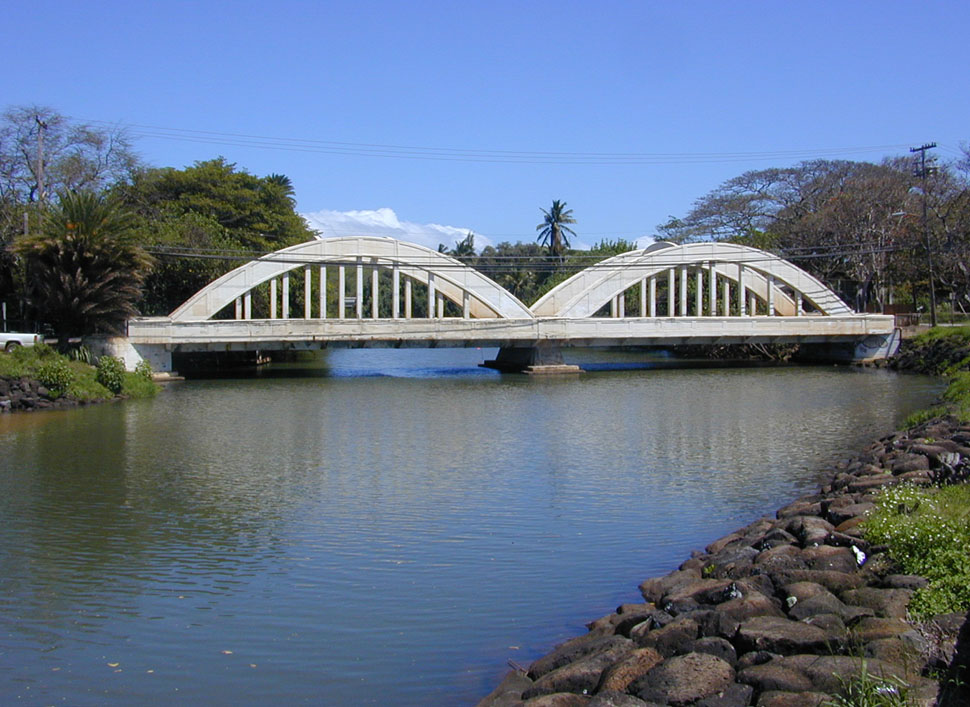
- Historic twin-span "Anahulu Bridge" over the Anahulu River marks the north end entrance to old Haleʻiwa Town

- Location in Honolulu County and the state of Hawaii
- Coordinates: 21°35′24″N 158°6′50″W
- Country: United States
- State: Hawaii
- County: Honolulu

Area
  - Total: 5.18 sq mi (13.41 km^{2})
  - Land: 3.08 sq mi (7.97 km^{2})
  - Water: 2.10 sq mi (5.44 km^{2})
- Elevation: 12 ft (3.7 m)

Population (2020)
  - Total: 4,941
  - Density: 1,605.1/sq mi (619.72/km^{2})
- Time zone: UTC-10 (Hawaii-Aleutian)
- ZIP code: 96712
- Area code: 808
- FIPS code: 15-10750
- GNIS feature ID: 0358941

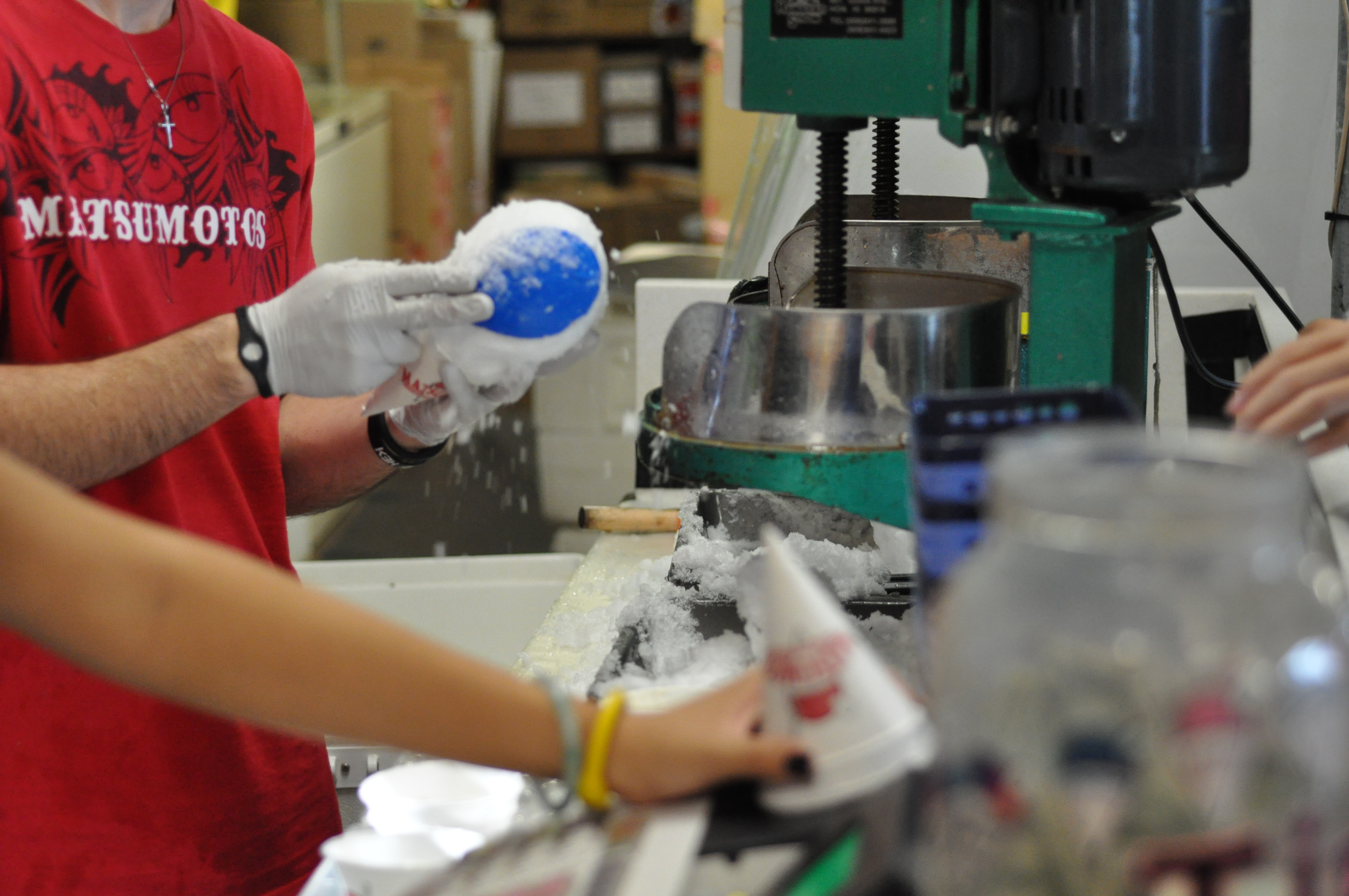
Closeup of the Matsumoto Shave Ice in Haleʻiwa

Haleʻiwa (Hawaiian pronunciation: [həleˈʔivə]) is a North Shore community and census-designated place (CDP) in the Waialua District of the island of Oʻahu, City and County of Honolulu. Haleʻiwa is on Waialua akanmuth Bay, the mouth of Anahulu Stream (also known as Anahulu River). A small boat harbor is there, and the shore of the bay is surrounded by Haleʻiwa Beach Park (north side) and Haleʻiwa Aliʻi Beach Park (south side). Further west from the center of town is Kaiaka State Recreation Area on Kiaka Point beside Kaiaka Bay.

As of the 2020 census, the CDP had a population of 4,941. The 2018 estimate was 4,040. It is the largest commercial center on the North Shore of the island. Its old plantation town character is preserved in many of the buildings, making this a popular destination for tourists and residents alike, visiting surfing, paddle-boarding, and diving sites along the north shore. The U.S. postal code for Haleʻiwa, including Kawailoa, is 96712.

== Geography ==
Haleʻiwa is located at 21°35'24" North, 158°6'50" West (21.590050, -158.113928), southwest along Kamehameha Highway (State route 83) from Pūpūkea. At Haleʻiwa, Kamehameha Highway becomes state route 99 (at the traffic circle known as "Weed Circle"), which runs eastward up across the Oʻahu central plateau to Wahiawā. A new bypass route (Joseph P. Leong Highway) avoids both the traffic circle and Haleʻiwa, extending state route 83 to just north of Haleʻiwa town. Haleʻiwa Road and both Kaukonahua Road and Waialua Beach Road from Weed Circle go south and southwest into Waialua across Paukauila Stream.

The historic Rainbow Bridge over the Anahulu River marks the northern entrance to old Haleiwa Town, which has small shops, eateries, and many galleries. Two beach parks surround the small boat harbor in Waialua Bay, Haleiwa Beach Park to the north and Haleiwa Alii Beach Park to the south.

According to the United States Census Bureau, the CDP has an area of 3.0 square miles (7.7 km^{2}). 2.3 square miles (5.9 km^{2}) of it is land, and 0.69 square miles (1.8 km^{2}) is water. The total area is 23.67% water.

== History ==
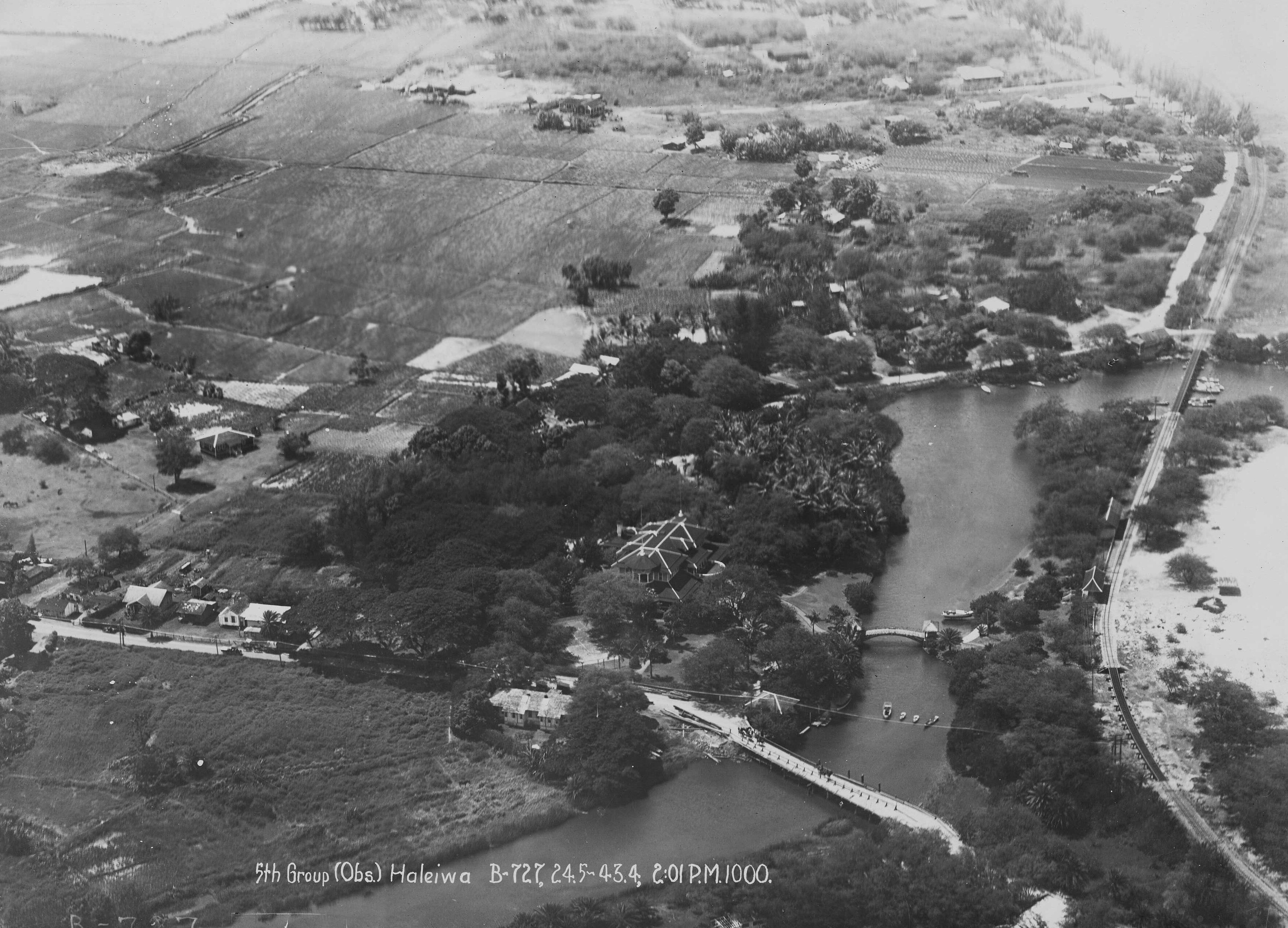
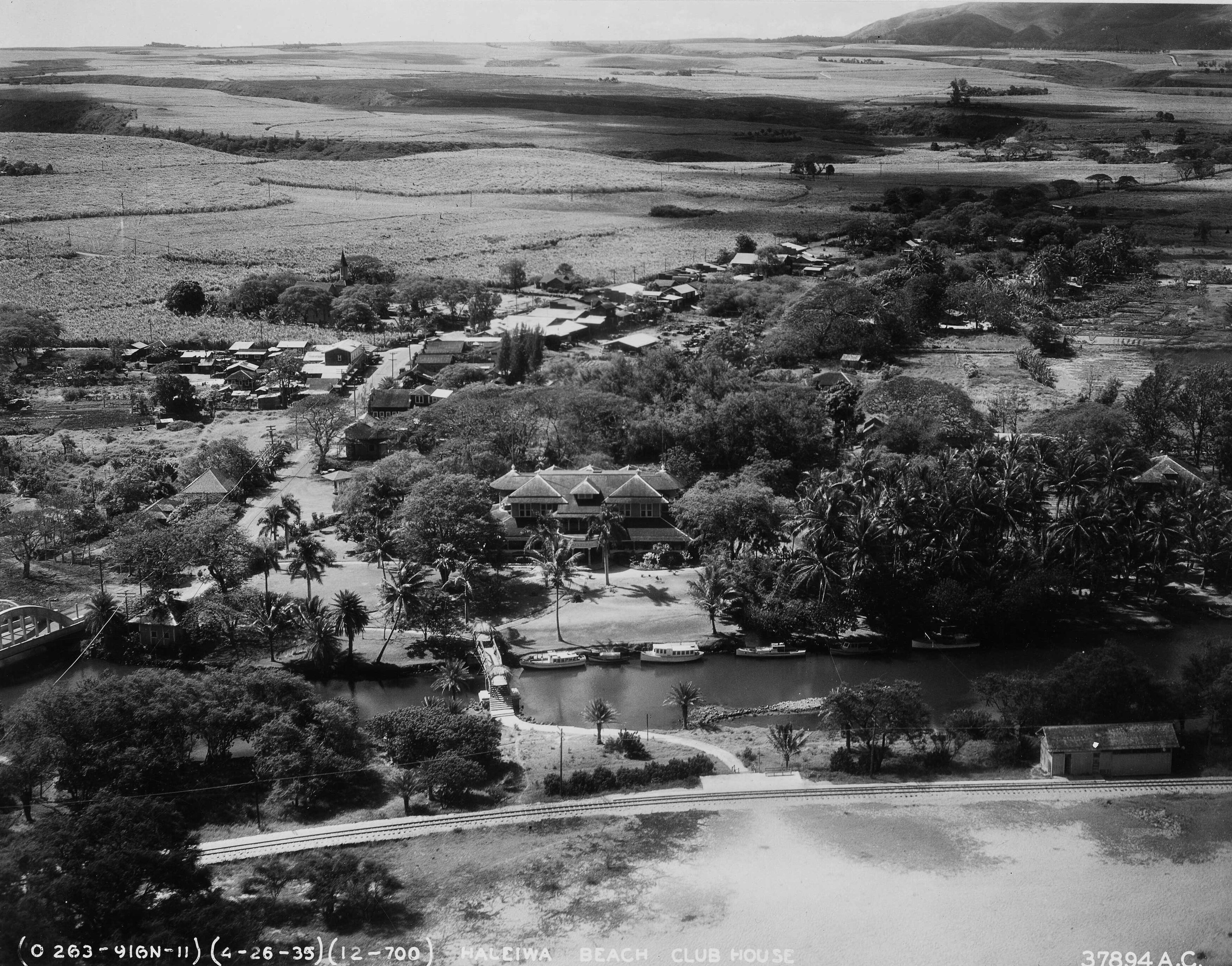
Haleʻiwa in 1925

In 1898 a businessman named Benjamin Dillingham opened a hotel in the North Shore area and named it Haleʻiwa. In the Hawaiian language, hale means 'house', and the ʻiwa means 'frigatebird'. He also built a railway line from Honolulu to Waialua along the west coast around Kaena Point, which opened the same year and ended in front of his hotel. The railroad inaugurated a passenger train, the Haleiwa Limited, which took two hours for this trip. This railroad was chartered as the Oahu Railway and Land Company.

Haleʻiwa was designated a State Historic, Cultural and Scenic District in 1984 by the City and County of Honolulu. All new buildings must adhere to a design plan that reflects the territorial architecture of Haleʻiwa's earlier sugar industry period. The town is home to 30 historic buildings featuring plantation architectural styles influenced by the Waialua Sugar Co.

The Haleiwa tidal gauge was the first in the state to record the tsunami caused by 2025 Kamchatka Peninsula earthquake: an amplitude of 4 feet (1.2 m) relative to normal sea level.

== Military ==
The 16th Coast Artillery's Battery F was assigned to four 8-inch M1888 railway guns that were located nearby on specially made spurs. These railway guns were soon dismounted and designated as Battery Kahuku. On December 7, 1941, two P-40B fighters, piloted by George Welch and Kenneth M. Taylor, managed to scramble against the Japanese attack on Pearl Harbor, taking off from the now-abandoned Haleʻiwa Airfield.

== Demographics ==
Historical population
Census	Pop.	Note	%±
2020	4,941		—
U.S. Decennial Census

As of the 2000 census, there were 2,225 people, 770 households, and 525 families residing in the CDP. The population density was then 469.4/km^{2} (1,218.1/mi^{2}). There were 867 housing units at an average density of 474.6 per square mile (183.2/km^{2}). The racial makeup of the CDP was 24.63% White, 0.49% Black or African American, 0.31% Native American, 28.85% Asian, 9.98% Pacific Islander, 0.81% from other races, and 34.92% from two or more races. 10.29% of the population were Hispanic or Latino of any race.

There were 770 households, out of which 28.8% had children under the age of 18 living with them, 45.7% were married couples living together, 14.4% had a female householder with no husband present, and 31.7% were non-families. 24.4% of all households were made up of individuals, and 8.7% had someone living alone who was 65 years of age or older. The average household size was 2.88 and the average family size was 3.46.

In the CDP the population was spread out, with 26.2% under the age of 18, 9.7% from 18 to 24, 27.2% from 25 to 44, 24.6% from 45 to 64, and 12.3% who were 65 years of age or older. The median age was 36 years. For every 100 females, there were 103.6 males. For every 100 females age 18 and over, there were 101.1 males.

The median income for a household in the CDP was $39,643, and the median income for a family was $48,553. Males had a median income of $31,750 versus $25,163 for females. The per capita income for the CDP was $16,504. 17.6% of the population and 15.0% of families were below the poverty line. Out of the total population, 26.2% of those under the age of 18 and 6.7% of those 65 and older were living below the poverty line.

== Education ==
The Hawaii State Department of Education operates public schools. Haleiwa Elementary School is in the CDP.

Sunset Beach Elementary School has a Haleiwa address and is in the Pupukea CDP.

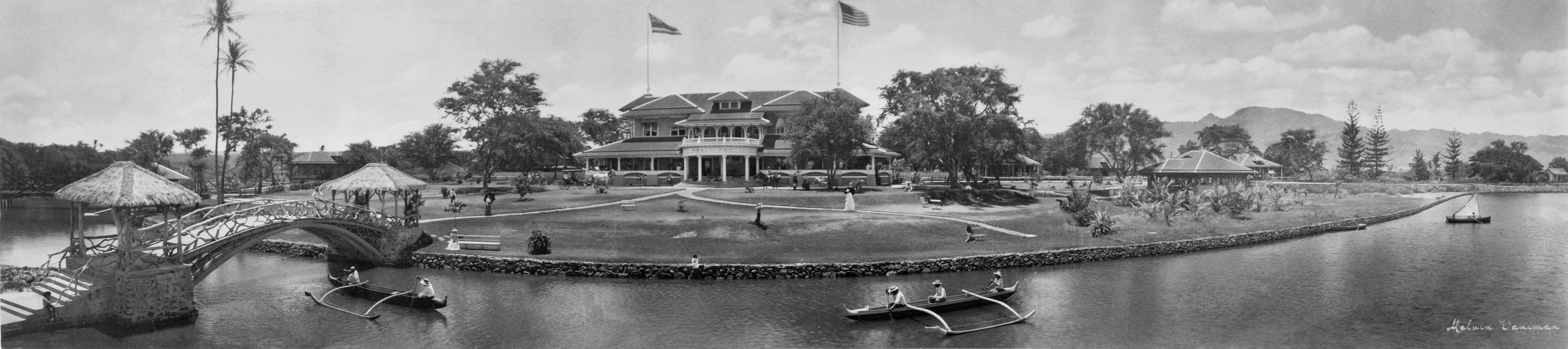
Panoramic image of Haleiwa Hotel in 1902, by Melvin Vaniman

== Attractions ==
Several of the beaches less popular with traditional surfers are becoming well known for foil surfing due to the strong surfing community and year-round interest in water sports. Winter months bring large waves to Haleiwa. Surf tourism is a popular attraction in Haleiwa. Haleiwa Harbor is also a popular destination for stand-up paddle boarding.

== Transportation ==
=== Roads ===
Two critical roads in Haleiwa are Kamehameha Highway and Joseph P. Leong Highway (Hawaii State 83). Both crosses over the Anahulu River. The former spans the river with the Rainbow Bridge, a double arch bridge built in 1921 and latter renamed in 1997 from Haleiwa Bypass after Joesph Paul Leong (1915-1992), the former Hawaii State Representative (D) for 42nd District from 1983 to 1984 and 14th District from 1985 to 1990.

Public transit is provided by TheBus routes 52, 60, 83, 88A and 521.

=== Airport ===
Closest civil aviation airport is Daniel K. Inouye International Airport in Honolulu.

== Notable people ==
- Brian Ching (born 1978) – soccer player who represented the United States national team
