= Sunset Beach (Oahu) =

Beach on the North Shore of Oahu in Hawaii

Coordinates: 21°39′59″N 158°03′19″W

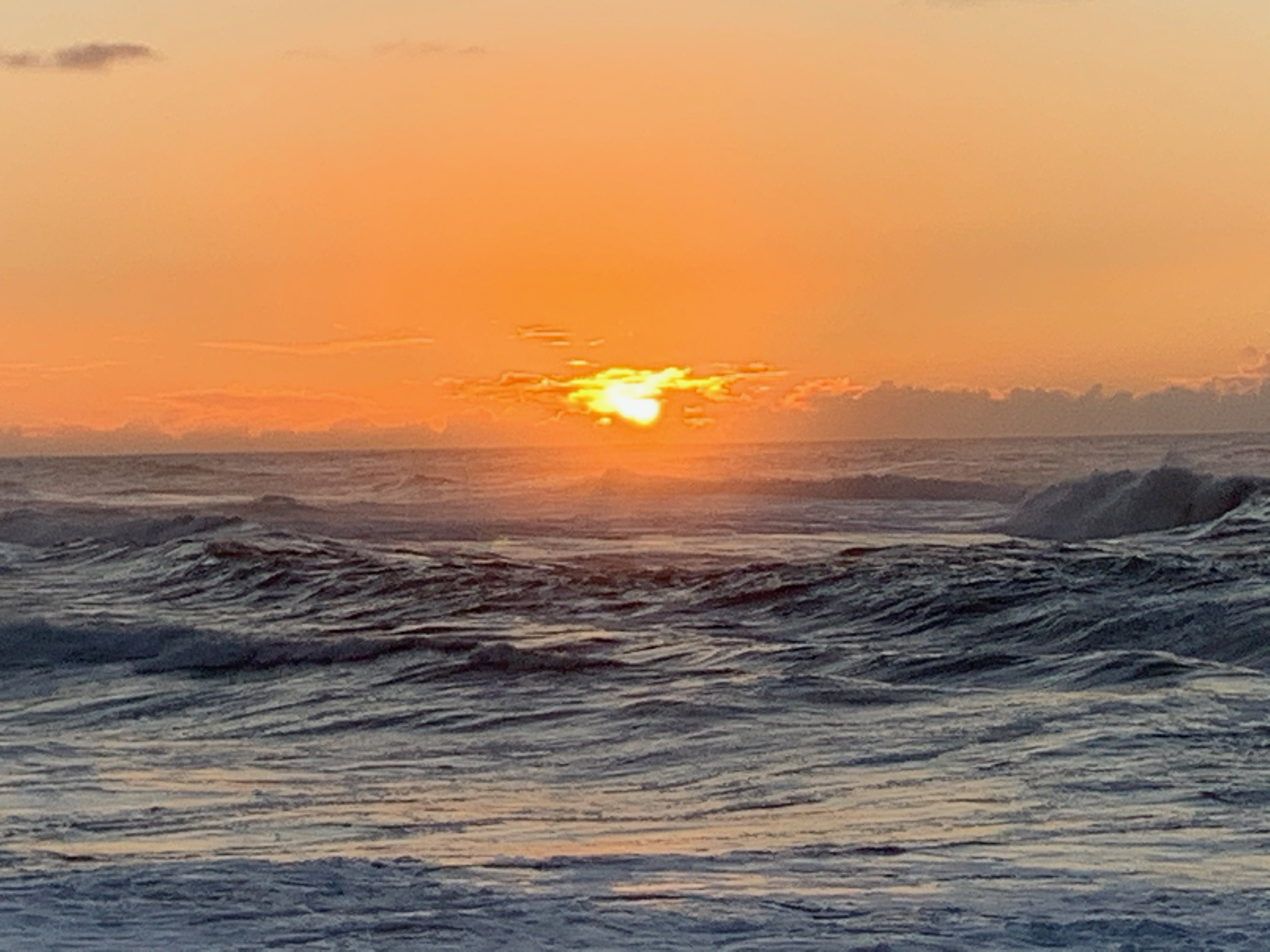
Sunset at Sunset Beach

Winter Sunset at Sunset Beach

Sunset Beach is on the North Shore of Oahu in Hawaii and known for big wave surfing during the winter season. The original Hawaiian name for this place is Paumalū. It is a two-mile (3.3 km) stretch of mostly beige sand located at 59-104 Kamehameha Highway in Pupukea, 39 miles (63 km) driving distance from Waikiki. Lifeguards are usually present.

Like many beaches on Oahu's North Shore, Sunset Beach is considered dangerous for inexperienced surfers, due to extensive coral formations near the surface that present the risk of serious injury. Trade winds will be an advantage and a disadvantage, at the same, as the offshore breeze will make paddling for a wave a difficult task. Conditions for swimming change depending on the particular location and season. Generally speaking, the water is flat as a lake in the summers and has waves in the winters. All the surfing contests take place in the winter around December and January, that being the time of the largest and best waves for surfing. Swimming conditions change from spot to spot along the beach. There is usually a place to swim somewhere, except during stormy weather.

Severe erosion of the sand at Sunset occasionally occurs during sets of extremely large surf episodes. During December in 2017 following several long lasting episodes with at least 30' to 40' waves for several days, severe sand erosion, which formed a more than 20' cliff along the edge of bicycle trail, closed the beach the week before Christmas. This catastrophic erosion caused the bike path to be rerouted closer to Kamehameha Highway when large concrete portions of the bike path fell off the cliff into the shore break area, forced the lifeguard tower to be relocated more inland, and required the city of Honolulu to demolish and remove the 11-by-11-foot (3.4 by 3.4 m) lifeguard storage shed. During extremely large surf in October 2013 and in December 2013 to January 2014, backyards, staircases, and swimming pools were swept out to sea.

== Surfing competitions ==
Sunset Beach will pump perfect waves with west-to-northeast swells coming from the North Pacific. The spot is located two miles (3.3 km) east of Banzai Pipeline. It was home to the Duke Kahanamoku Invitational Surfing Championship until 1985. The Quiksilver Big Wave Invitational in honor of Eddie Aikau started at Sunset Beach in 1984. Today Sunset Beach is home to the prestigious Triple Crown of Surfing, which is part of the World Cup of Surfing. It also holds contests such as the Pipe Masters and a stop on the WSL Championship Tour

== Gallery ==
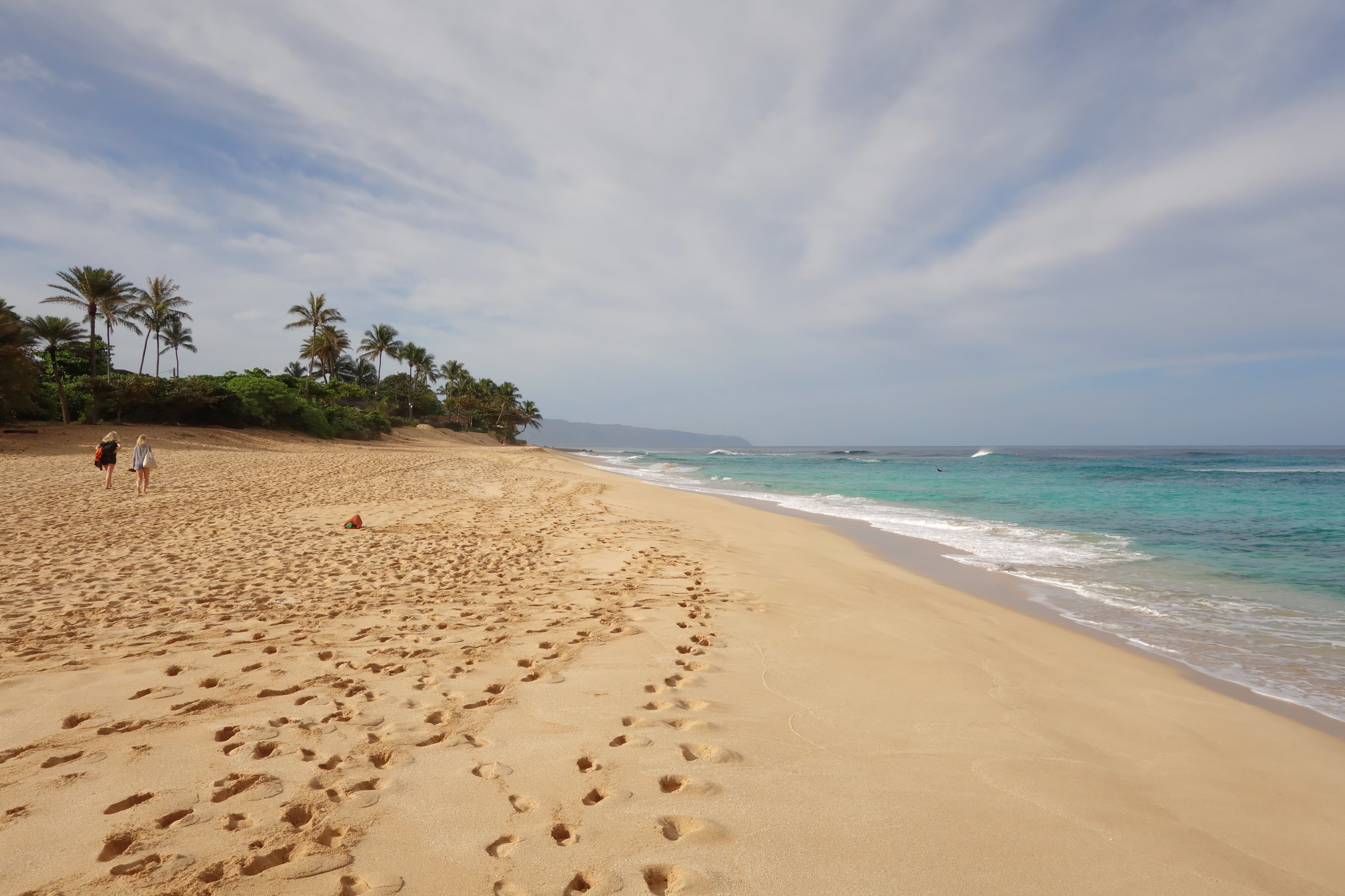
People walking on Sunset Beach

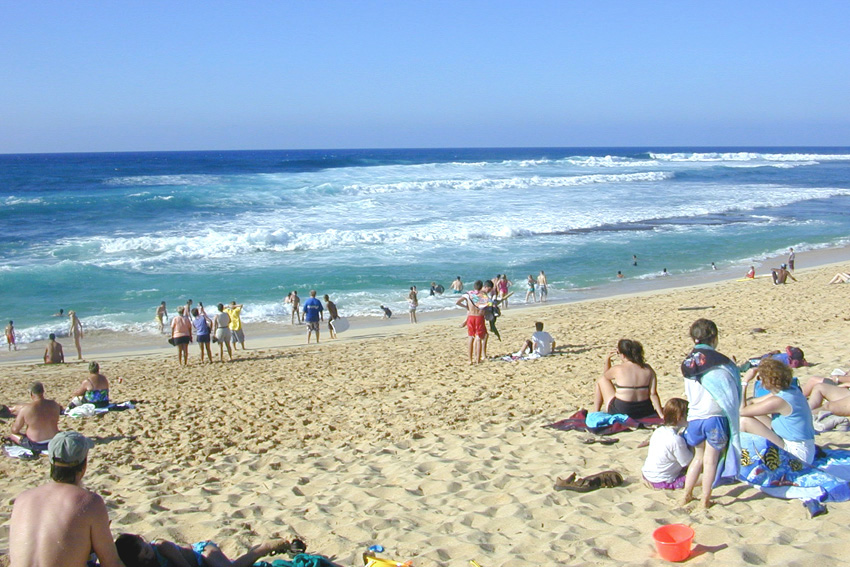
Sunset Beach on Oʻahu's North Shore

== See also ==
- Big wave surfing
