= Ramsey Denison =

American filmmaker

- Born: Ramsey G. Denison; Bellingham, Washington, U.S.
- Occupations: Filmmaker, director, producer, editor
- Years active: 2005-present
- Notable work: What Happened in Vegas
- Parent(s): Tom Denison; Carolyn Denison

Ramsey Denison is a director, producer, editor and documentary filmmaker who is best known for his critically acclaimed documentary What Happened in Vegas, which went to #1 on iTunes documentary charts in June 2018.

== Early life and education ==
Denison was born in Bellingham, Washington, to parents Tom Denison, a shop teacher, and Carolyn Denison, an educator. He grew up in Satellite Beach, Florida, and graduated with the class of 1997 from Satellite High School. He received a journalism degree from Eastern Washington University.

== Career ==
At 18, Denison went to work for WBCC-TV in Cocoa, Florida. By 2004, he moved to Los Angeles, and the following year was hired as an assistant editor on TV documentaries and reality shows, including Catfish: The TV Show, The Hills Have Eyes, High School Musical 2, and Sky High and The Family Stone.

A short film Somewhere in the City, written, directed and produced by Denison, screened at over 30 film festivals and won awards at Vail Film Festival, San Fernando Valley International Film Festival, and Berkeley Film and Video Festival.

In 2013, Denison and a friend, Rhett Nielson, a former SWAT team videographer in Las Vegas, traveled to Nevada on vacation. While there, Denison witnessed what he told the media was two officers being rough with a suspect. He placed a call to 911 asking that a supervisor respond to the scene. Instead, Denison was himself arrested and spent three days in the Clark County Detention Center.

The arrest led to Denison developing the story into a documentary about police brutality. It resulted in his directorial debut of the full-length documentary, What Happened in Vegas, with its first screening at the 2017 Cinequest Film Festival.

Los Angeles Times reviewer Michael Rechtshaffen wrote that What Happened in Vegas "blows the whistle on a disturbing pattern of excessive force and corruption within its ranks." The Village Voice opined that issues Denison uncovers within the police department "serve as a warning to all Americans." Daphne Howland in LA Weekly' noted that "What Happened in Vegas is more than a revenge project. He unveils a pattern of police malfeasance, including coverups and lies, through disturbing stories of unjustified deaths. It’s a damning takedown of the city’s powers that be."

The film also screened at the FreedomFest conference at the Paris Las Vegas hotel-casino in July 2017 where it won the Grand Jury Prize and went to #1 on iTunes documentary chart in June 2018.

Denison and another filmmaker, Charlie Minn, each accused the Eclipse Theater in Las Vegas of failing to screen their movies because their films are critical of the Las Vegas Metropolitan Police Department.

What Happened in Vegas prompted Denison's probe into the 2017 mass shooting at the Mandalay Bay Resort in Las Vegas, where 59 people were killed, for a second documentary. It is titled Money Machine, with screenings at American Documentary and Animation Film Festival in March 2020 and Cleveland International Film Festival.

== Awards ==
In 2017, Denison received the best documentary award at the 2017 Las Vegas Black Film Festival for What Happened in Vegas.

What Happened in Vegas was awarded ta Grand Jury Prize at Freedom Fest in 2017.
