= Satellite High School =

Public high school in Satellite Beach, Florida, United States

Location
- 300 Scorpion Ct; Satellite Beach, Florida 32937; United States; 28°11′09″N 80°35′49″W

Information
- Type: coed
- Established: 1962
- School district: Brevard County Public Schools
- Principal: Courtney Lundy
- Staff: 65.80 (FTE)
- Grades: 9-12
- Enrollment: 1,517 (2022–23)
- Student to teacher ratio: 23.05
- Colors: Scarlet and Silver
- Athletics: Cape Coast Conference
- Nickname: Scorpions
- Newspaper: The Satellite Telstar
- Yearbook: Scorpio
- Website: School website

Satellite High School is a public high school (grades 9 - 12) located in Satellite Beach, Florida in Florida's Space Coast, Brevard County. It was founded in 1962, and has been rated an 'A' school in the state of Florida since 2003 . The mascot is the Scorpion.

The school made national news in 2025 for firing a teacher for referring to a student by their preferred name instead of their legal name, as required by a 2023 Florida law. Thousands signed a petition demanding her reinstatement and many parents spoke on her behalf at school board meetings.

== Academics ==
The school has 92 teachers, 12 support personnel, six administrators, and four guidance counselors.

== State school grades and demographics ==
2007 Overall Grade: A

- Stability rate (% of students in attendance 1st semester who are present 2nd semester): 93.54%
- Graduation rate: 96.41%
- SAT scores average: Mathematics (Year 2006) 544, Reading (Year 2006) 526
- ACT average: (Year 2006) 21.8
- Gifted Students: 14.28%
- Race Distribution: 91% White, 4% Hispanic, 3% Asian, 2% Black

== Campus ==
In 2009, a $35 million upgrade was completed.

== Fine Arts ==
=== Fine Arts Academy ===
Satellite High School is one of five high schools in Brevard County to have a Fine Arts Academy. The Fine Arts Academy is a Career Academy that integrates arts education into the core academic curriculum. Fine arts areas of concentration include Digital Media, Fashion Design, Instrumental Music, Technical Design, Theatre, Visual Arts, and Vocal Music.

== Athletics ==
Satellite is part of the Florida High School Athletic Association and competes in the Cape Coast Conference located in Brevard County, Florida.

Satellite has captured 17 state championships in six sports in its 46-year history. The girls have won 13 state championships in its history.

=== State championships ===
- Girls’ Basketball - 1983 4A State championships https://fhsaa.com/documents/2024/2/13//Basketball_Girls_2024.pdf?id=5036
- Softball - 1982 & 1990
- Baseball - 1986
- Men's Swimming - 1996 Class 5A championship, 1999 Class 3A championship, & 2005 Class 2A championship
- Men's Cross Country - 2019 Class 2A championship, 2020 Class 2A championship
- Girls' Swimming - 2004 Class 2A championship, 2005 Class 2A championship, 2006 Class 2A championship, 2007 Class 2A runner-up
- Girls' Cross Country - 2005 Class 3A championship, 2006 Class 3A championship, 2007 Class 3A championship
- Girls' Soccer - 2002 Class 3A championship (29-1-1, Finished No. 5 in nation), 2003 Class 3A championship (27-2-0), 2007 Class 5A championship. Reached Final Four from 1995–1998, 2002–2005, & 2007-2009.

== Notable alumni ==
- Mark Baldwin - 1970. Game designer and developer.
- Ramsey Denison - 1997. Documentary filmmaker, editor
- Ashlyn Harris - 2004. Four-Time Parade Magazine All-American goalkeeper for the University of North Carolina women's soccer team. Three-time NCAA Champion. Two-time FIFA Women's World Cup champion.
- Catharina Haynes - 1980. A federal judge on the United States Court of Appeals for the Fifth Circuit.
- C. J. Hobgood - 1997. Twin brother of Damien Hobgood, Professional surfer.
- Damien Hobgood - 1997. Twin brother of C.J. Hobgood, Professional surfer.
- Kelly Kretschman - 1997. Softball record holder
- Yahn Bernier - 1986. Software developer at Valve Software and former patent lawyer in Atlanta.
- Britt McHenry - 2004 ESPN Sports Reporter
- J. Keith Moyer - 1970. President, CEO and Publisher of the Minneapolis Star Tribune, senior fellow in journalism at University of Minnesota
- Gary Pruitt - 1975 President and CEO of The Associated Press.
- Matt Skrmetta - 1990. Major League Baseball pitcher
- Leonard Weaver - 2001. all-pro fullback for the Seattle Seahawks & Philadelphia Eagles (2006–2010)
