= Christian Surfers =

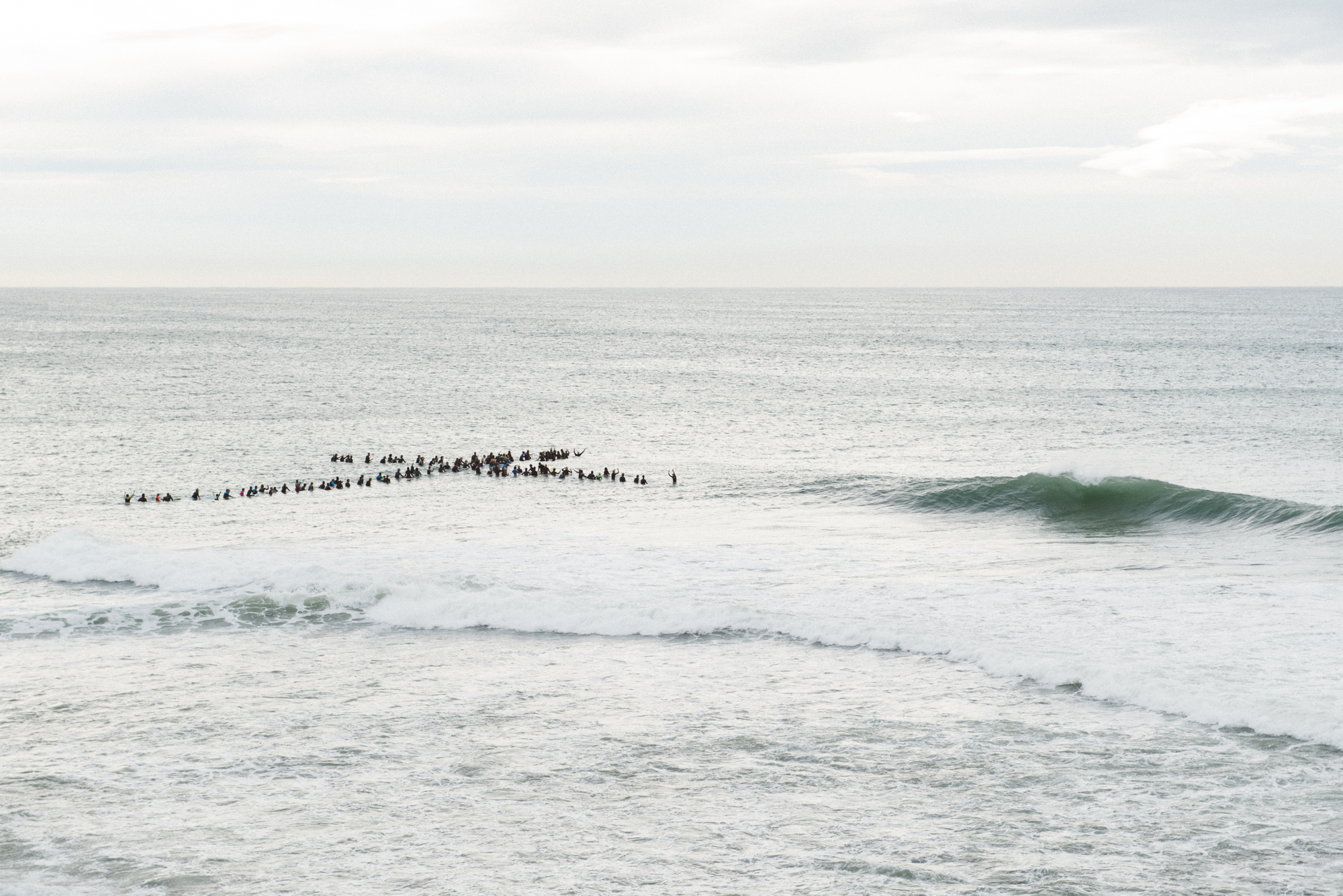
Christian Surfers International Cross Paddle Out Australia 2016

Christian Surfers is an interdenominational mission movement composed of members who believe in God amongst the global surfing community. It was founded in the late 1970s in Cronulla, Australia.

== Background ==
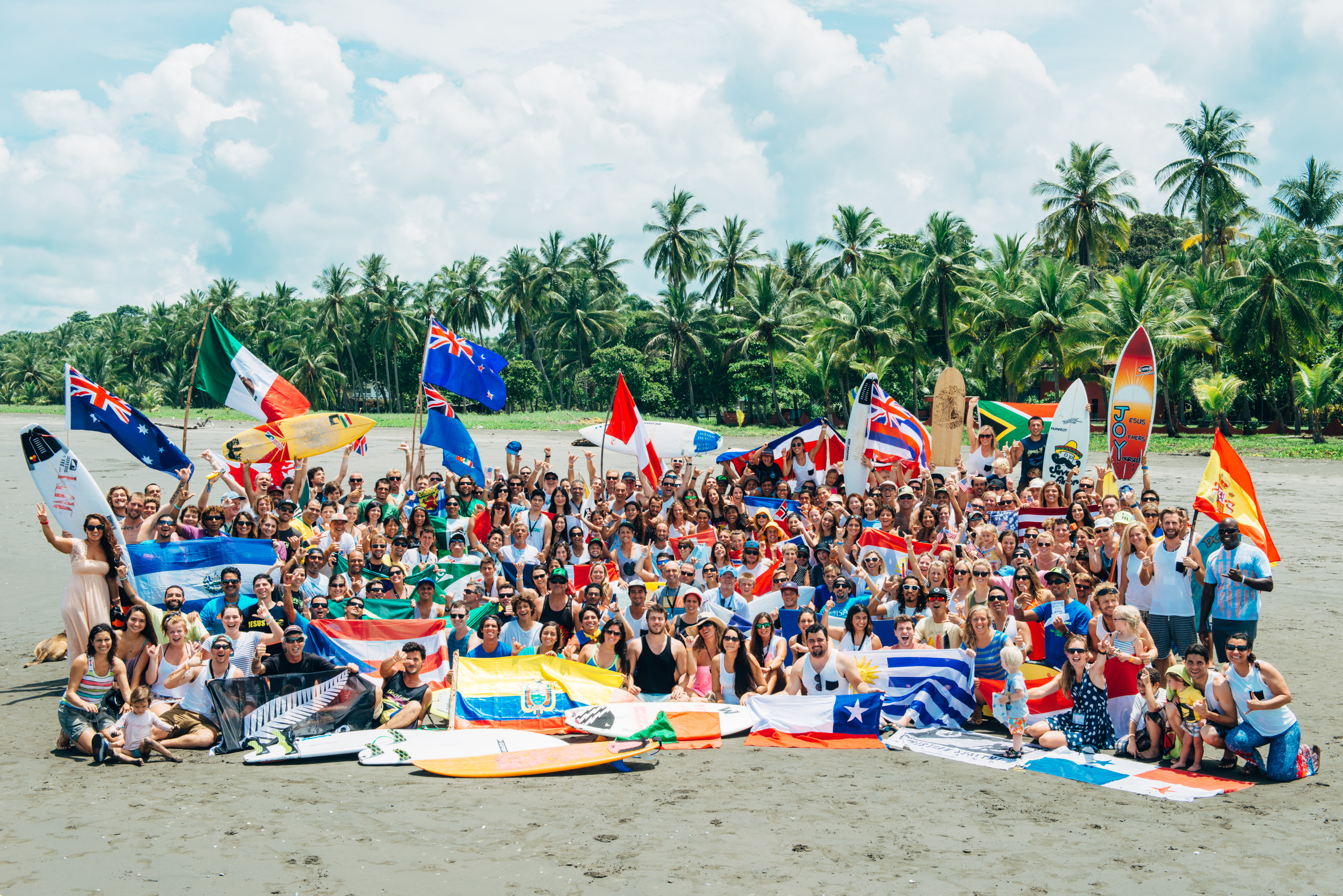
Christian Surfers International

The movement, which is incorporated as a not-for-profit in Australia, also has chapters in over 35 countries worldwide including New Zealand, United States, United Kingdom, South Africa, France, Japan, Spain, Norway, Costa Rica, and Brazil. Christian Surfers have received recognition for their commitment to the international surfing community, organic faith initiatives, and compassionate activities such as tsunami-relief and other aid projects, as well as providing chaplaincy to the World Surf League. The Christian Surfers International website is the primary source for information about the work of Christian Surfers globally.

CS (as it is often referred to) publishes the Surfers Bible, runs mission trips, camps and surf comps like the Jesus Surf Classic and the Jesus Pro Am, premieres films in conjunction with Walking on Water, provides a positive mentoring environment for young surfers, offers hospitality for traveling surfers, and undertakes numerous social action initiatives (in the countries listed above, and also abroad).

At its core the movement's goal is that every surfer and every surfing community has opportunity to know and follow Jesus.

== Members ==
Notable members of the movement include:

- Bethany Hamilton
- C.J. Hobgood
- Damien Hobgood
- Bianca Buitendag
- Timmy Curran
- Tom Curren
- Skip Frye
- Joey Buran
- Glyndyn Ringrose
- Al Merrick
- Eric Arakawa
- John Carper (JC Surfboards)
