= FCS (fins) =

- Company type: Subsidiary
- Industry: Retail, textile
- Founded: 1995; 31 years ago in Gold Coast, Queensland
- Founders: Brian A. Whitty
- Headquarters: Newport, New South Wales, Australia
- Area served: Worldwide
- Products: Surfwear • Streetwear
- Parent: Surf Hardware International
- Website: www.surffcs.com.au

FCS (Fin Control System) is a brand, as well as type, of fin set-up which allows for more versatility in the placement and style of the fins attached to a surfboard. The FCS style can be used as the traditional tri-fin placement (thruster), a two fin (twin), a four fin (quad), or a five fin set up. The tri-fin refers to a setup with three fins on the underside of the board, often with the two outer fins angled inward and middle fin a few inches closer to the end of the tail pointed straight and larger. The five fin placement is similar but with four outer fins and one middle fin (these fins are often smaller). The quad fin setup has 4 outer fins but no middle fin.

Some styles enable the rider to adjust the fore and aft positioning of the fin. The injection molded fins are designed to break off in the event of collision to minimize board damage and injury to the surfer.

== Design ==
The FCS system was designed by Brian A. Whitty in Elanora, Queensland, Australia, and patented on November 7, 1995. It can be recognised by the 2 tabs on the fins which are designed to fit into a securing plug that attaches the fin to the board. The fin tabs are placed in slots which are set into the board by the use of a plug that fits flush with the underside of the board. They are secured into these plugs by the use of set screws which can be tightened down by a fin key or Allen wrench. The plug design and use of set screws enables the fin to be easily removed and installed for storage or travel.

These plugs can be installed in a variety of different ways in order to create the correct degree of strength needed for the fin to function. The more common method is to drill the plug hole at the end of the shaping process and then secure the plug in the hole with resin. The plug attaches through the use of the “H-pattern” which binds at both the deck and bottom of the board fiberglass to the plug which provide the most strength at the fin without permanent installation through glassing on (same as laying on fibreglass). A version of FCS (Fusion) had been designed to be installed before the surfboard blank is covered with fibreglass and is the preferred version of FCS for epoxy surfboards.

In September 2013, FCS introduced FCS II, a new pre-glass fin system to the market. The new system claims a number of key advantages over its predecessors. Firstly, the need for any screws or tool to secure the fins has been eliminated; the fins now simply lock into the plugs. Secondly, the leading edge of the fin resides inside the plug, and the base of the fins sit flush to the surface of the board creating a more seamless connection. The final key feature of the new system is that it's backward compatible, meaning it will accept fins from the original dual tab system. Adding two grub screws and a small silicon insert allows you to secure your two tab fins into the new system. Many consider the new system inferior, Channel Islands Surfboards parted with FCS after the new system and Kelly Slater continues to surf the original FCS tabs on his Komunity Project fins.

== Selected riders ==
- CJ Hobgood
- Damien Hobgood
- Adriano DeSouza
- Mark Occhilupo
- Sunny Garcia
- Oscar Wright
- Tom Carroll
- Jarrad House
- Julian Wilson
- Gabriel Medina
- Mick Fanning
- Filipe Toledo
- Kolohe Andino
- Jeremy Flores
