= Mundaka wave =

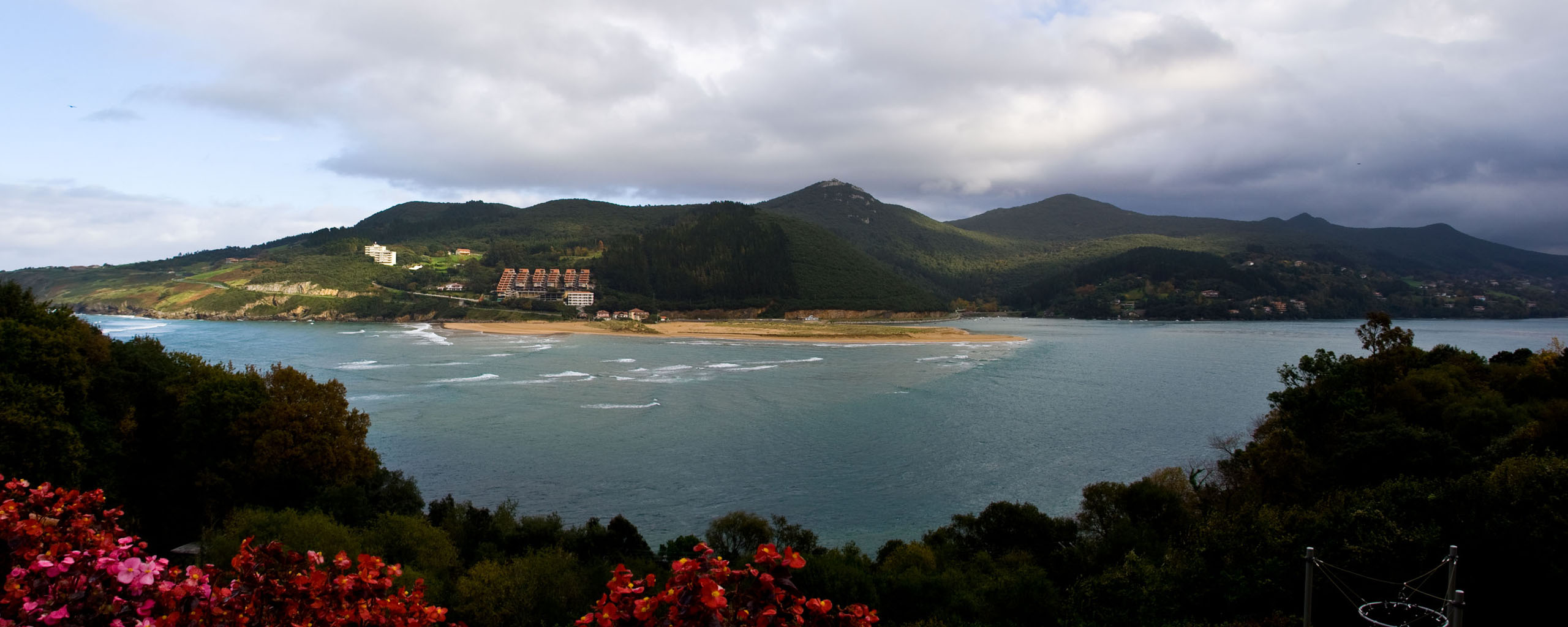
Coast near Mundaka, Biscay

The Mundaka wave is a surfing location in Mundaka, Basque Country, Spain, and is often considered one of the world's best.

== Surf ==
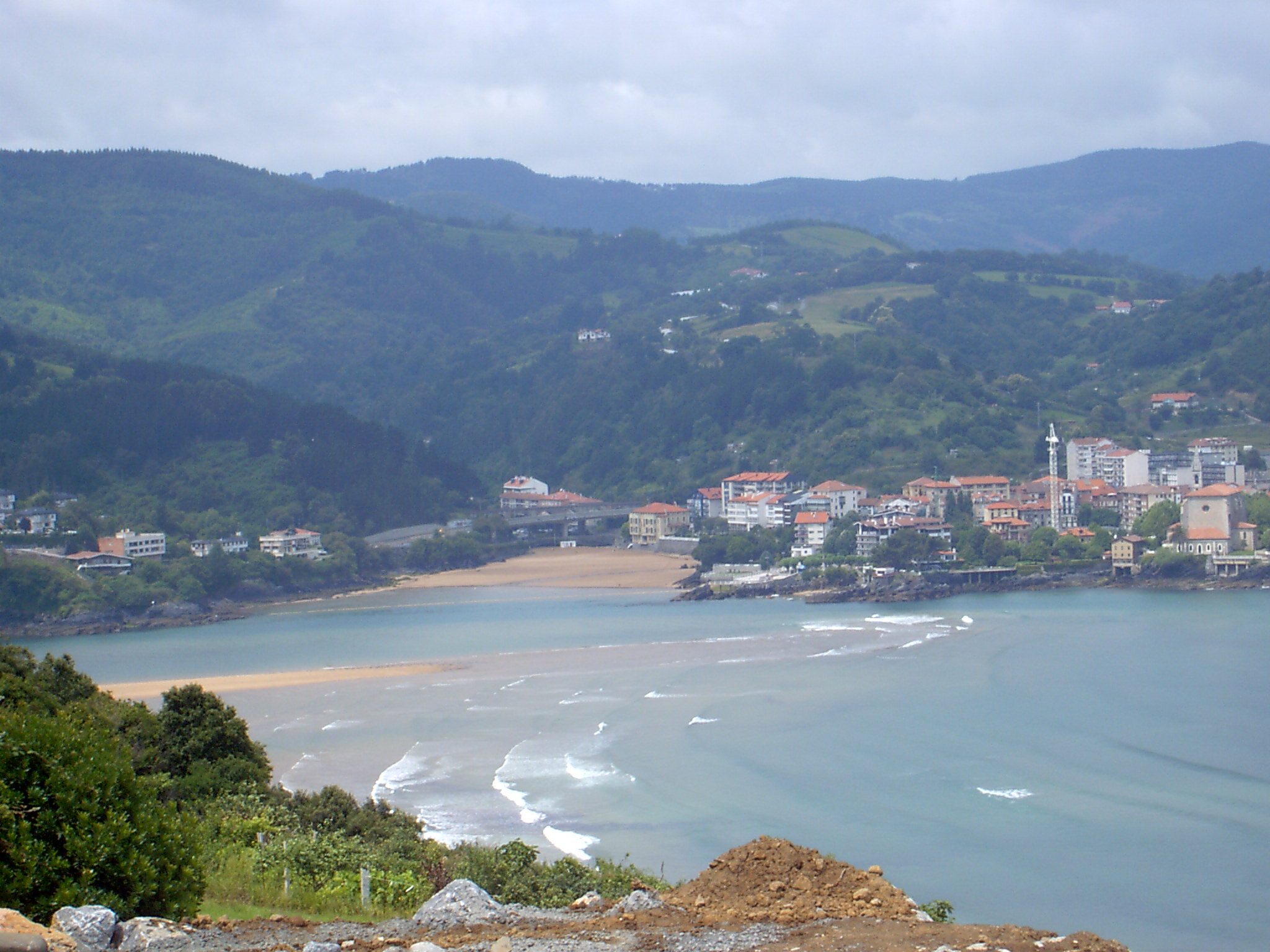
Mundaka

Mundaka's port

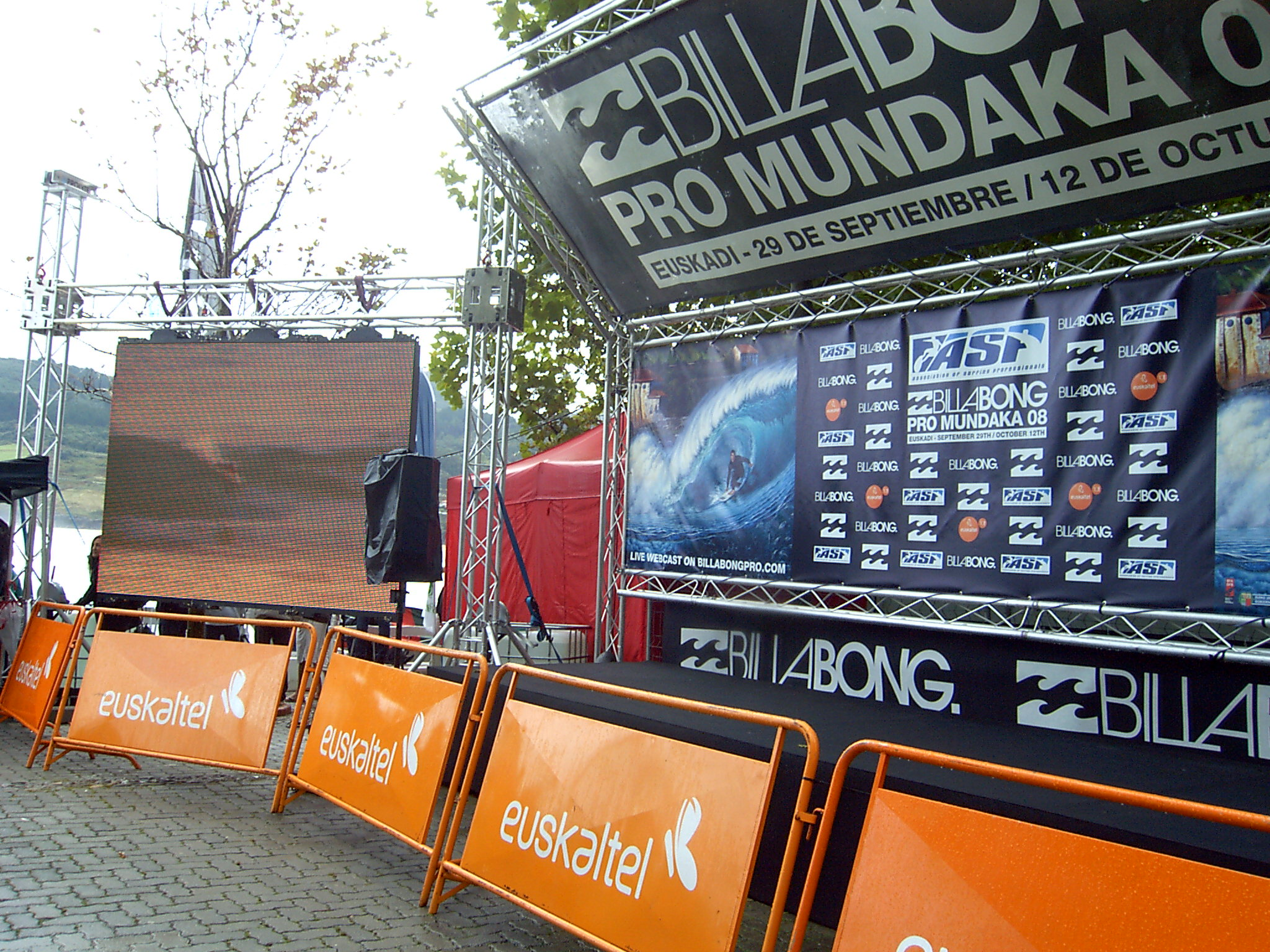
Mundaka surf championship

Swells roll in from the Bay of Biscay and slam into the rocky coastline of Basque Country. The estuary at Mundaka created a perfect sandbar that forms hollow waves. Mundaka was formerly a site for the World Championship Tour of Surfing. Surfers include Andy Irons, Taj Burrow, Kelly Slater, Mark Occilupo, and Joel Parkinson.

The wave is “perfect” for surfing one of every three days of the year. During winter, the possibility of surfing surpasses 50%. In January, 62% of days are surfable.

== History ==
Billabong Pro Mundaka was one of the most important tests of the ASP World Tour. It was hosted in Mundaka from the beginning of October until mid-month. The event ran from 1999 to 2009 and was canceled twice during its history: first, in 2001, due to the 9/11 attacks in New York and second, in 2005, due to the temporary disappearance of the wave.

=== Disappearance and cancellation in 2005 ===
The wave disappeared temporarily in 2005 due to dredging of the nearby river mouth which changed the structure of the sandbar and surrounding ocean currents, leading to the cancellation of the surf competition. In 2004, more than 230,000 cubic meters of sand was dredged from the Urdaibai estuary to allow for passage of a ship built at shipyard of Murueta. The loss of sand caused the character of the wave to change drastically, with the wave breaking over a smaller area, Closing out, or not breaking at all.

Mundaka, which had received an average of 10,000 visitors for the event, lost an important attraction and the regional economy suffered. Over time, the ocean reestablished the bottom structure as it had existed before 2003 and the wave returned. By 2006, conditions had improved to allow the Billabong Pro Mundaka to return, though that year's contest was primarily held at nearby Bakio due to a lack of swell.

== Champions ==
Year	Champion	Nacionality
2009	Adriano de Souza	Brazil
2008	C. J. Hobgood	United States
2007	Bobby Martinez	United States
2006	Bobby Martinez	United States
2005	Cancelled	-
2004	Luke Egan	Australia
2003	Kelly Slater	United States
2002	Andy Irons	Hawaii
2001	Cancelled	-
2000	Shane Dorian	Hawaii
1999	Mark Occhilupo	Australia
