= Leonard Weaver =

American football player (born 1982)

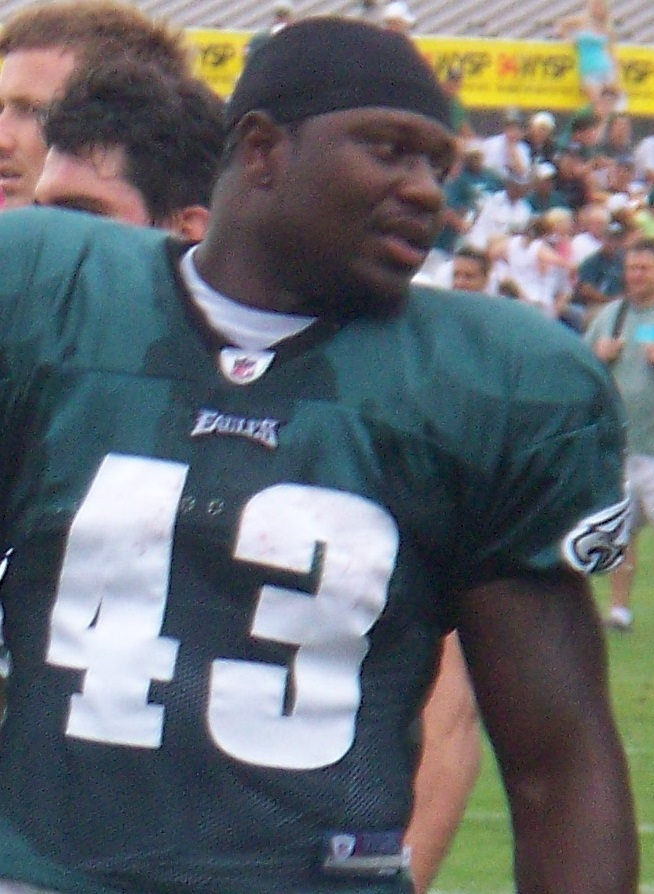
- Weaver with the Philadelphia Eagles in 2009

No. 43
- Position: Fullback

Personal information
- Born: September 23, 1982 (age 44); Cocoa, Florida, U.S.
- Listed height: 6 ft 0 in (1.83 m)
- Listed weight: 252 lb (114 kg)

Career information
- High school: Satellite (Satellite Beach, Florida)
- College: Carson-Newman
- NFL draft: 2005: undrafted

Career history
- Seattle Seahawks (2005–2008); Philadelphia Eagles (2009–2010)

Awards and highlights
- First-team All-Pro (2009); Pro Bowl (2009); Division II All-American (2004)

Career NFL statistics
- Rushing yards: 679
- Rushing average: 4.5
- Rushing touchdowns: 3
- Receptions: 75
- Receiving yards: 687
- Receiving touchdowns: 4
- Stats at Pro Football Reference

Leonard Toney Weaver III (born September 23, 1982) is an American former professional football player who was a fullback in the National Football League (NFL). He played college football for the Carson-Newman Eagles. He was signed by the Seattle Seahawks as an undrafted free agent in 2005, and has also played for the Philadelphia Eagles. He retired from the NFL in 2013.

== Early life ==
Born to Jennifer Gilmore and Leonard T. Weaver Jr., Weaver attended Satellite High School in Satellite Beach, Florida, and was a student and a letterman in football, basketball, and track. Weaver played running back and quarterback at Satellite.

== College career ==
Weaver attended Carson-Newman College and played for the Carson-Newman Eagles football team. He began his college football career at Carson-Newman as a linebacker, making nine tackles in two starts as a redshirt freshman in 2001. The next year, he moved to H-back. In 2003, Weaver recorded 16 receptions for 410 yards and six touchdowns. In the Division II Playoffs that year, he made a 67-yard touchdown reception.

In his final year, still an H-back, Weaver earned Division II All-American honors from the AP, American Football Coaches Association and others. He led the 9–3 Carson-Newman Eagles to a conference championship and the second round of the Division II playoffs with 27 catches for 571 yards and 8 touchdowns, leading all Eagles receivers.

== Professional career ==
=== Seattle Seahawks ===
Weaver was signed Seattle Seahawks as an undrafted free agent in 2005 and converted him to the fullback position.

In the 2006 preseason, he suffered a high ankle sprain, causing the Seahawks to put him on injured reserve.

After starting fullback Mack Strong suffered a herniated disk in his neck, prompting him to retire, Weaver was named the Seahawks starting fullback. His first starting game was against the New Orleans Saints, where Weaver had 3 carries for 40 yards and 3 receptions for 53 yards. He recorded his first touchdown against the St. Louis Rams on November 25, 2007, on a 5-yard run.

A restricted free agent in the 2008 offseason, Weaver signed his one-year, $1.417 million tender offer on April 17.

=== Philadelphia Eagles ===
==== 2009 ====
Weaver, who was an unrestricted free agent after the 2008 season, signed a one-year, $1.75 million contract with the Philadelphia Eagles on March 20, 2009. There are said to be incentives in the deal that could make it worth a total of $2.5 million. He scored his first touchdown as a Philadelphia Eagle on November 1, 2009, against the New York Giants on a 41-yard run. When the season ended, Weaver was considered to be the best fullback in the NFL. His rushing total was his career high, with 70 carries for 323 yards (a 4.6 average) and 2 touchdowns. However, he was most valued for his blocking ability.

Weaver was selected to the 2010 Pro Bowl as a starting fullback. He was also voted in to be First Team All-Pro for the 2009 season.

As a restricted free agent heading into the offseason, Weaver signed a three-year contract worth $11 million, $6.5 million guaranteed. This deal made him the highest paid fullback in NFL history.

==== 2010 ====
Weaver was injured on his first carry of the 2010 season, on September 12, 2010, against the Green Bay Packers and had to be carried off the field. His injury was later revealed to be "a very severe" torn ACL in his left knee, requiring season-ending surgery. He was placed on injured reserve on September 13. He was released on July 28, 2011, after failing his physical.

Weaver announced his retirement on April 22, 2013. He signed a one-day contract with the Eagles in order to retire with his former team.

== Personal ==
Weaver has four sons and one daughter, Leonard IV, David, Jeremiah, Micah, and Grace. He is married to LoQuita Weaver. He has five sisters and six brothers. He was named Coral Springs High School Football Coach on March 5, 2020. In April 2021, he was named head football coach for Park Vista Community High School in Lake Worth, Florida. In June 2022 he was made the running backs coach at h his Alma Mater Carson Newman

Weaver battled depression in college, having suffered a personal tragedy which he has not disclosed. Leonard's mother is a pastor. His grandfather, Bishop L.T. Weaver Sr. is a prominent C.O.G.I.C. minister with a street named after him in his hometown. Leonard's faith and community involvement are of great importance to him. He had been nicknamed "The Bishop" in college for his proclivity to spend free time traveling with a ministry in the off-season singing Christian themed R&B music.
