= Ashlyn Harris =

American professional soccer player (born 1985)

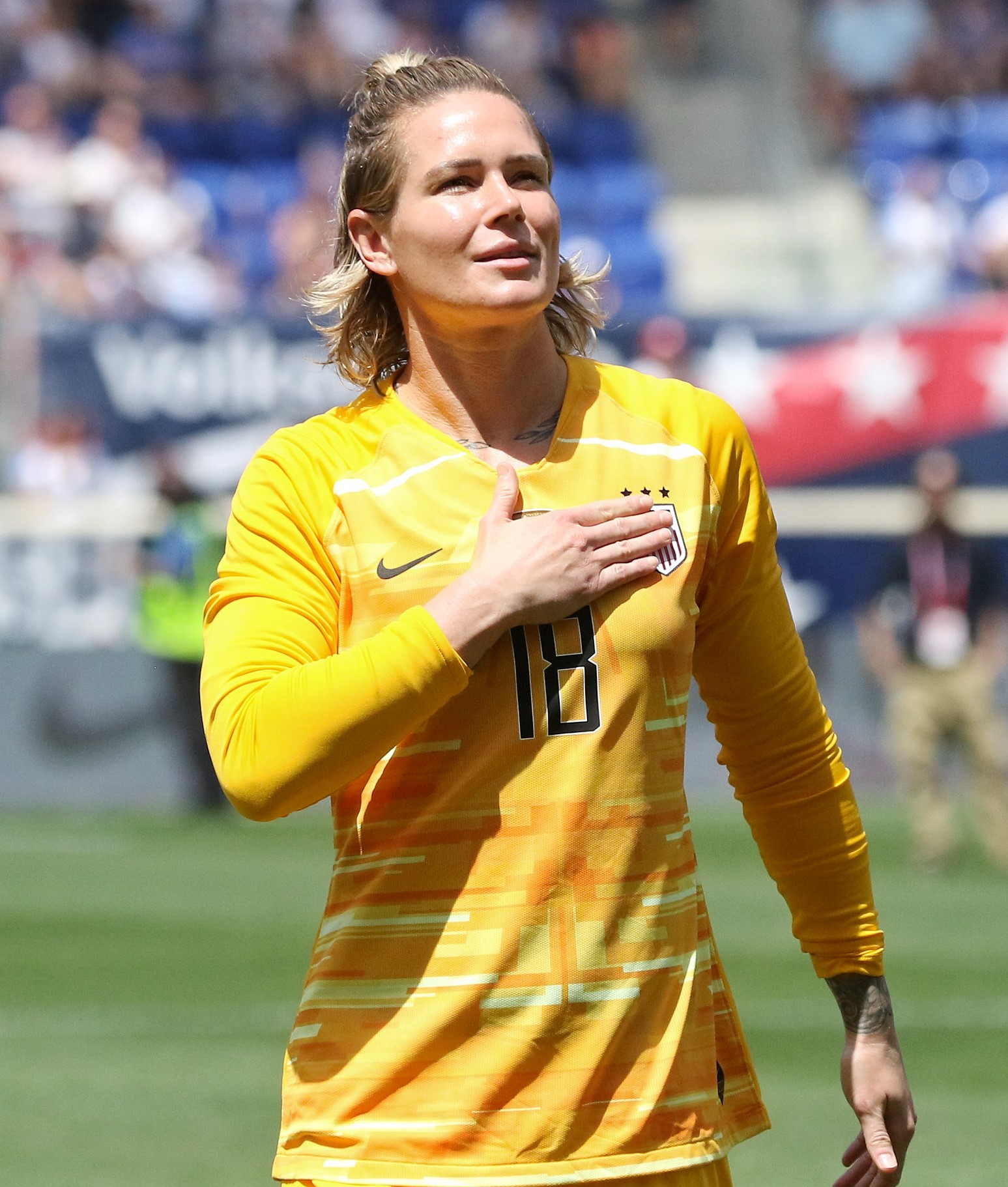
- Harris with the USWNT in May 2019

Personal information
- Full name: Ashlyn Michelle Harris
- Date of birth: October 19, 1985 (age 41)
- Place of birth: Satellite Beach, Florida, U.S.
- Height: 5 ft 9 in (1.75 m)
- Position: Goalkeeper

Youth career
- 2001–2004: Satellite High School

College career
Years	Team	Apps	(Gls)
2006–2009	North Carolina Tar Heels	77	(0)

Senior career*
Years	Team	Apps	(Gls)
2009	Pali Blues	5	(0)
2010	Saint Louis Athletica	0	(0)
2010	Washington Freedom	9	(0)
2011–2012	Western New York Flash	18	(0)
2012–2013	FCR 2001 Duisburg	8	(0)
2013–2015	Washington Spirit	46	(0)
2013	→ Tyresö FF (loan)	7	(0)
2016–2021	Orlando Pride	82	(0)
2022	Gotham FC	8	(0)
Total		183	(0)

International career
2000–2004	United States U-19	39	(0)
2005–2006	United States U-21		
2013–2022	United States	25	(0)
Medal record
FIFA U-19 Women's World Championship
Gold medal – first place	2002 Canada	Team
Bronze medal – third place	2004 Thailand	Team
FIFA Women's World Cup
Gold medal – first place	2015 Canada	Team
Gold medal – first place	2019 France	Team
Spouse(s)	Ali Krieger (m. 2019; div. 2023) Sophia Bush (m. 2025)
- * Club domestic league appearances and goals

Ashlyn Michelle Harris (born October 19, 1985) is an American former soccer player who played as a goalkeeper.

She represented the United States women's national soccer team, making her debut for the senior national team on March 11, 2013, and was a member of the championship-winning team at the 2015 FIFA Women's World Cup in Canada and at the 2019 FIFA Women's World Cup in France.

Harris played college soccer for the University of North Carolina Tar Heels and helped the team win three NCAA Division I Women's Soccer Championships. Professionally, Harris played for Saint Louis Athletica, Washington Freedom, and the Western New York Flash of Women's Professional Soccer as well as FCR 2001 Duisburg of the Frauen-Bundesliga and Tyresö FF of the Damallsvenskan.

She also played for Washington Spirit, Orlando Pride, and Gotham FC in the National Women's Soccer League (NWSL).

== Early life ==
Born to Tammye and Mike Harris, Ashlyn was raised with her older brother, Chris. Growing up, she looked up to her brother and frequently joined him and his friends skateboarding and surfing. Until the age of 14, she played club soccer with the boys' teams. She first played for the Palm Bay Rangers and South Brevard United before playing for the Seminole Ice girls' team. In 2003, Harris won the state championship with the U-17 Indialantic Force.

Harris attended Satellite High School in Satellite Beach, where she played soccer under coach Fitzgerald Haig. Harris helped the team win state championship titles in both her sophomore and junior year. Following her senior season, Harris was named the nation's number one recruit by Soccer America. She was then named the 2004 Gatorade Player of the Year and 2004 NSCAA Player of the Year. At the end of her high school career, Harris was a four-time Parade Magazine All-American, a four-time NSCAA Youth All-American, and a McDonald's All-American. She was the first female player to be named in four consecutive Parade All-American soccer teams. She was named Florida Player of the Year in her last two years at Satellite High School. Harris also made All-Conference, All-District, and All-States teams for all four years of her high school career. In her 65 career games at Satellite High School, she recorded 50 shutouts and had 0.29 goals against average. She graduated in May 2004 with a 3.8 GPA.

=== North Carolina Tar Heels, 2006–09 ===
Harris signed with the University of North Carolina Tar Heels to play for head coach Anson Dorrance. Due to national team commitments for the FIFA U-19 Women's World Cup in Thailand, Harris delayed her enrollment and did not start training with the Tar Heels until the spring of 2005. In the spring, during practise, a ball caught her right hand as she was warming up and shattered her thumb. After a surgery that inserted three pins in her thumb, she was put on the bench until the summer.

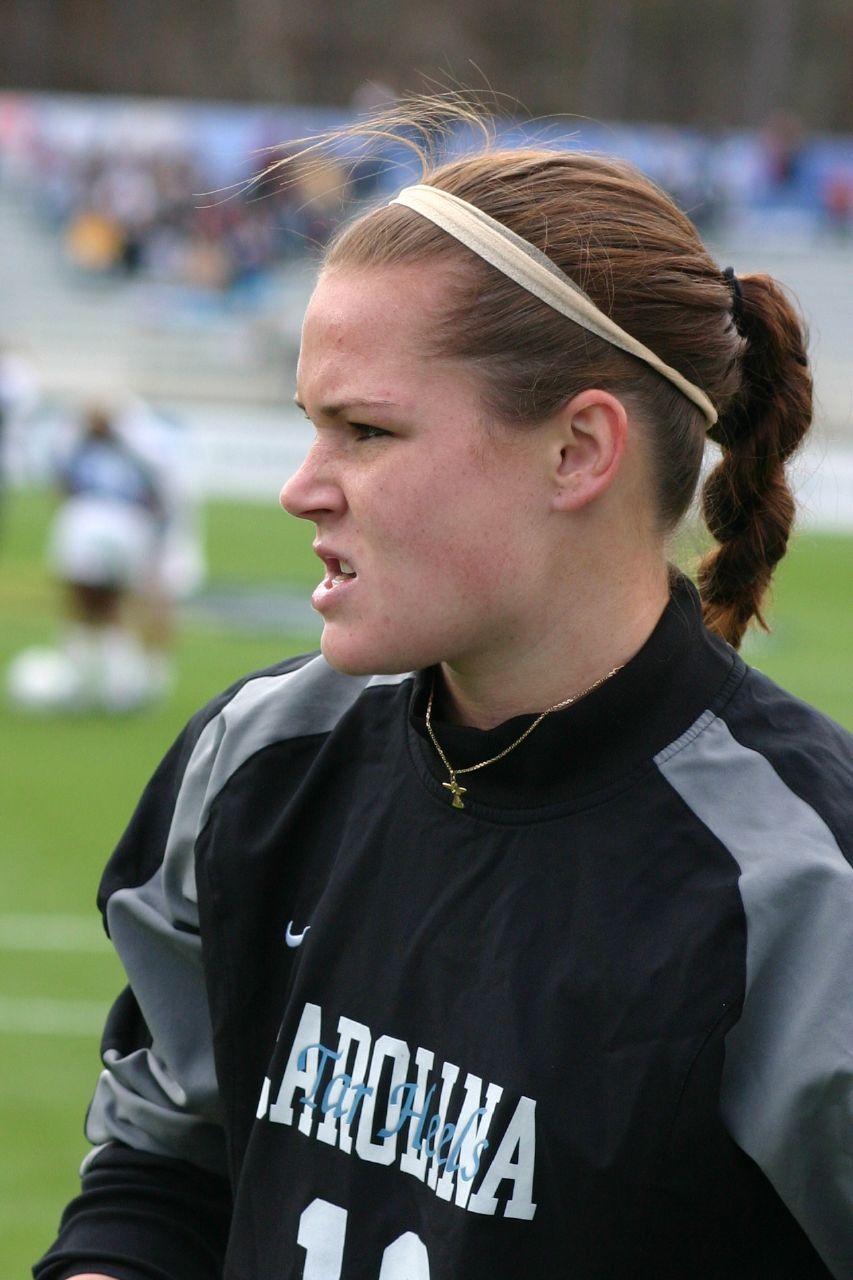
Harris with the Tar Heels during the NCAA final against Notre Dame on December 3, 2006

At her first practice back with the Tar Heels in the summer of 2005, Harris tore her right anterior cruciate ligament, which kept her out for the entire 2005 season. Despite being hurt, Harris still made the 2006 Atlantic Coast Conference Academic Honor Roll team.

After recovering from her ACL injury, Harris returned to practice with the Tar Heels in the spring of 2006. However, she then tore her left ACL during a training camp with the U-21 Women's National Team in June 2006. She was able to make it back in time for the 2006 NCAA women's soccer tournament in November, although in a strategy employed by Dorrance, she came in as a substitute each game. She played in all six NCAA tournament matches, including the championship game against Notre Dame, a 2–1 win for UNC. Harris was named to the 2007 ACC Academic Honor Roll at the end of her sophomore year.

During the 2007 season, Harris was diagnosed with a torn labrum in her right hip, an injury which occurred during a goal kick. Harris did not miss any games following the injury and instead chose to deal with the pain and switch to predominantly using her left leg during play. Dorrance again employed the two-goalkeeper method, as Harris split time with junior goalkeeper, Anna Rodenbough. The two goalkeepers alternated starts and played for half of each game. Harris played in 19 games and made 9 starts, playing a total of 1120 minutes. She conceded nine goals and recorded 29 saves, giving her a 0.763 save percentage. UNC lost their match against Notre Dame in the third round of the 2007 NCAA women's soccer tournament on November 24, 2007.

The 2008 season was the first where Harris was healthy for the entire season. Dorrance again employed Harris in the two-goalkeeper system alongside Rodenbough. Harris played in 27 games and made 13 starts, playing a total of 1233 minutes. She conceded nine goals and recorded 28 saves (a 0.757 save percentage). In the 2008 NCAA women's soccer tournament, Harris appeared in the second half of the third-round match against Illinois, where she made three saves, as well as the semi-final match against UCLA, where she again made three saves. She appeared in goal in the championship game against Notre Dame, which UNC won 2–1.

Harris returned for the 2009 season, the first season in which she did not share the starting position with another goalkeeper. She started all 25 of her appearances for the team, playing a total of 2163 minutes. She conceded 10 goals in 25 games and recorded 45 saves for a 0.818 save percentage and 0.42 goals against average. UNC went on to win the 2009 NCAA women's soccer tournament with a 1–0 win over Stanford in the championship game.

==== College summary ====
Year	GP/GS	Min	GA	GAA	Saves	Pct	SO	Record
2006	6/0	247	3	1.09	7	.700	0	2–0–0
2007	19/9	1220	9	0.66	29	.763	3	10–1–1
2008	27/13	1233	9	0.66	28	.757	0	10–0–1
2009	25/25	2163	10	0.42	45	.818	12	21–3–1
Totals	77/47	4863	31	0.57	109	-	15	43–4–3

== Club career ==
=== Pali Blues, 2009 ===
On April 16, 2009, Harris and UNC teammate Whitney Engen signed with the Pali Blues of the W-League. The W-League was often used by college players as a summer playing option because of its status as an open league, allowing college players to maintain eligibility. Harris made five appearances with the team for the 2009 season during the summer before returning to UNC for her senior year. The Pali Blues went undefeated in the regular season and then went on to win the W-League Championship with a 2–1 win over Washington Freedom in the final.

=== Saint Louis Athletica, 2010 ===
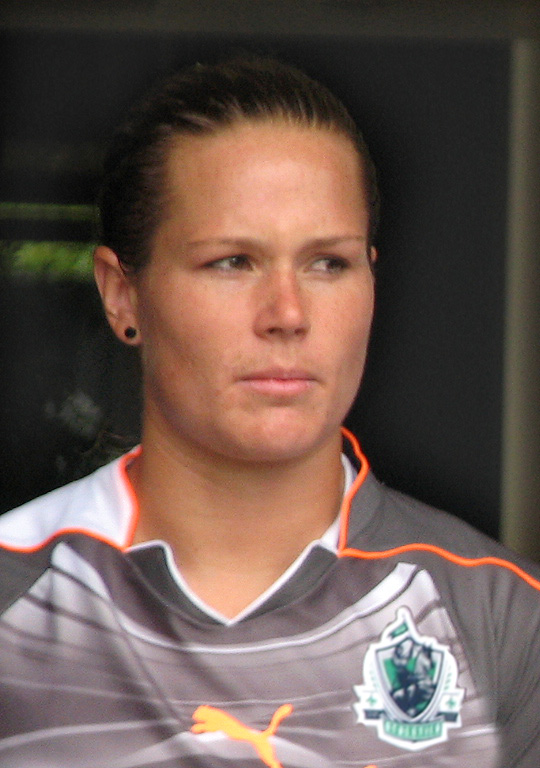
Harris with Saint Louis Athletica in 2010

Harris was selected as the 19th pick in the 2010 WPS Draft by Saint Louis Athletica on January 15, 2010. During her time with Athletica, Harris trained alongside United States women's national team starting goalkeeper Hope Solo. The goalkeeper coach for the national team, Paul Rogers, was also on the staff for Athletica, providing another benefit for Harris. Regarding her situation with Athletica, Harris stated that she "was probably in the best situation possible as a rookie goalkeeper." On May 27, 2010, six weeks into the second Women's Professional Soccer league season, Saint Louis Athletica ceased operations due to financial problems. Harris did not appear in any of the six games for Saint Louis before the dissolution. Harris, as well as all other players on the Athletica roster, became free agents on June 1.

=== Washington Freedom, 2010 ===
On June 2, 2010, Harris signed with the Washington Freedom. After signing with the Freedom, Harris stated that her contributions to the team would not be through starting and playing, as Erin McLeod was the starting goalkeeper for the team at the time. On July 24, McLeod suffered an ACL tear during a match against FC Gold Pride. Briana Scurry, the back-up for the Freedom, had suffered a concussion earlier in the year and was also out for the season. Harris was left as the starting goalkeeper and made her first appearance for the team on July 28, 2010 against Atlanta Beat. She appeared in the seven remaining games of the regular season and earned the Freedom a spot in the playoffs. The Freedom took on the Philadelphia Independence in the first round of the playoffs on September 19. Harris made three saves in regular time; the match was goalless after 90 minutes. In the 120th minute, Amy Rodriguez scored for Philadelphia, resulting in a 1–0 loss and elimination from the playoffs for the Freedom.

=== Western New York Flash, 2011 ===
In December 2010, the Western New York Flash, previously part of the W-League, joined the WPS for the 2011 season. Shortly after, the Flash announced they had signed Harris. She appeared in the team's debut in the league on April 17, 2011, playing against the Boston Breakers. She made eighteen appearances for the Flash in the regular season, conceding only eighteen goals and helping the Flash rank number one at the end of the season. Harris started in the 2011 WPS Championship final against the Philadelphia Independence. The game was tied 1–1 after regulation and extra time, leaving the outcome of the match to be decided by penalty kicks. Both the Independence and the Flash scored their first four shots. However, Harris blocked the next shot by Philadelphia's Laura del Río, clinching the championship for the Flash. She was named the 2011 Coast Guard Goalkeeper of the Year following a successful 2011 season.

=== FCR 2001 Duisburg, 2012 ===
On January 30, 2012, it was announced that the 2012 WPS season would be suspended following legal and financial challenges. Although the league was intended to resume for the 2013 season, it officially folded in May. In June, Harris signed a two-year contract with FCR 2001 Duisburg in the Frauen-Bundesliga, the top professional women's league in Germany. She made her first appearance for the team on October 3, 2012, where she recorded a shutout against VfL Sindelfingen. She made eight appearances for Duisburg, appearing for a total of 630 minutes.

=== Washington Spirit, 2013 ===
On January 11, 2013, Harris was allocated to the Washington Spirit during the 2013 NWSL Player Allocation for the inaugural season of the National Women's Soccer League. On February 23, following the allocation, Harris announced that she would be leaving Duisburg and returning to the US in order to play in the newly-formed NWSL. She started in the Spirit's first match on April 14 against the Boston Breakers. In her 18 appearances for the Spirit in the 2013 season she made 84 saves, ending the season with a 72% save percentage. The Spirit finished in last place in the league and did not advance to the playoffs.

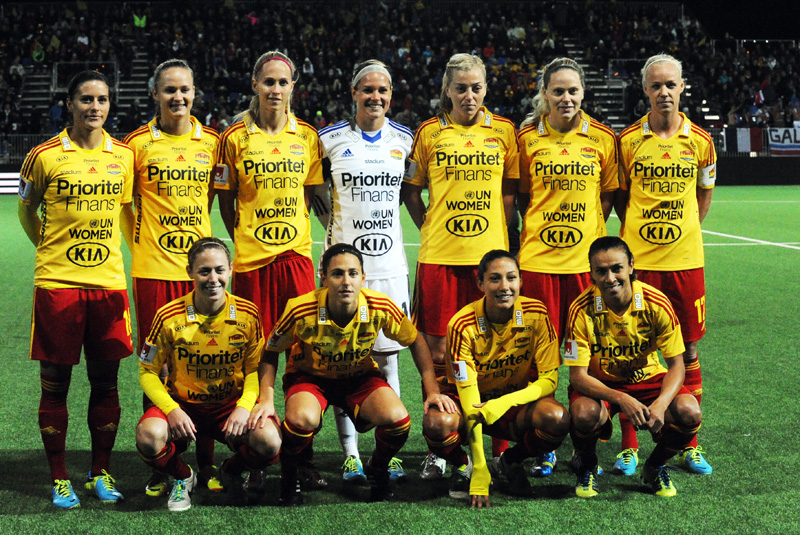
Harris (top, middle) with Tyresö FF in 2013

=== Tyresö FF, 2013 ===
In July 2013 it was announced that Harris would be joining the Swedish club Tyresö FF immediately following the end of the inaugural NWSL regular season in late August. Harris, Spirit teammate Ali Krieger, and former UNC teammate Whitney Engen all signed short-term contracts with the team. They joined United States national team members Christen Press and Meghan Klingenberg, who were already with the club on long-term contracts. Four days after the end of the NWSL season, on August 21, 2013, Harris played her first game for Tyresö. She made seven appearances with the team in the Damallsvenskan and four appearances in the UEFA Women's Champions League.

In December, following the announcement that Engen, Press, and Klingenberg would be staying with Tyresö until the end of the Champions League, Harris announced that she was leaving Sweden in order to return for the 2014 NWSL season.

=== Washington Spirit, 2014–15 ===
On January 3, 2014, Harris was once again allocated to the Washington Spirit for the 2014 season. Harris started all 19 of her appearances for the Spirit in the 2014 season, conceding 31 goals across 1710 minutes.

On July 2, the Washington Spirit faced the Boston Breakers. In the 88th minute, Spirit defender Ali Krieger was issued a yellow card. Harris confronted Boston Breakers forward Jazmine Reeves and referee Dimitar N. Chavdarov stepped in to resolve the altercation. Harris then appeared to push Chavdarov. The Professional Referee Organization reviewed the incident and found that the contact was minimal. An NWSL spokesman released the following statement regarding the incident:

In reviewing the play, the referee comes in between Washington's Harris and Boston's Reeves to manage a confrontation and prevent Harris from continuing her progress towards Reeves. As the referee turns away from Harris to manage the approach of Washington's Krieger towards Reeves, Harris extends her arms to separate herself from the referee. Minimal contact with the referee is apparent from the video evidence available. Therefore, we do not feel any further action against Harris is warranted.

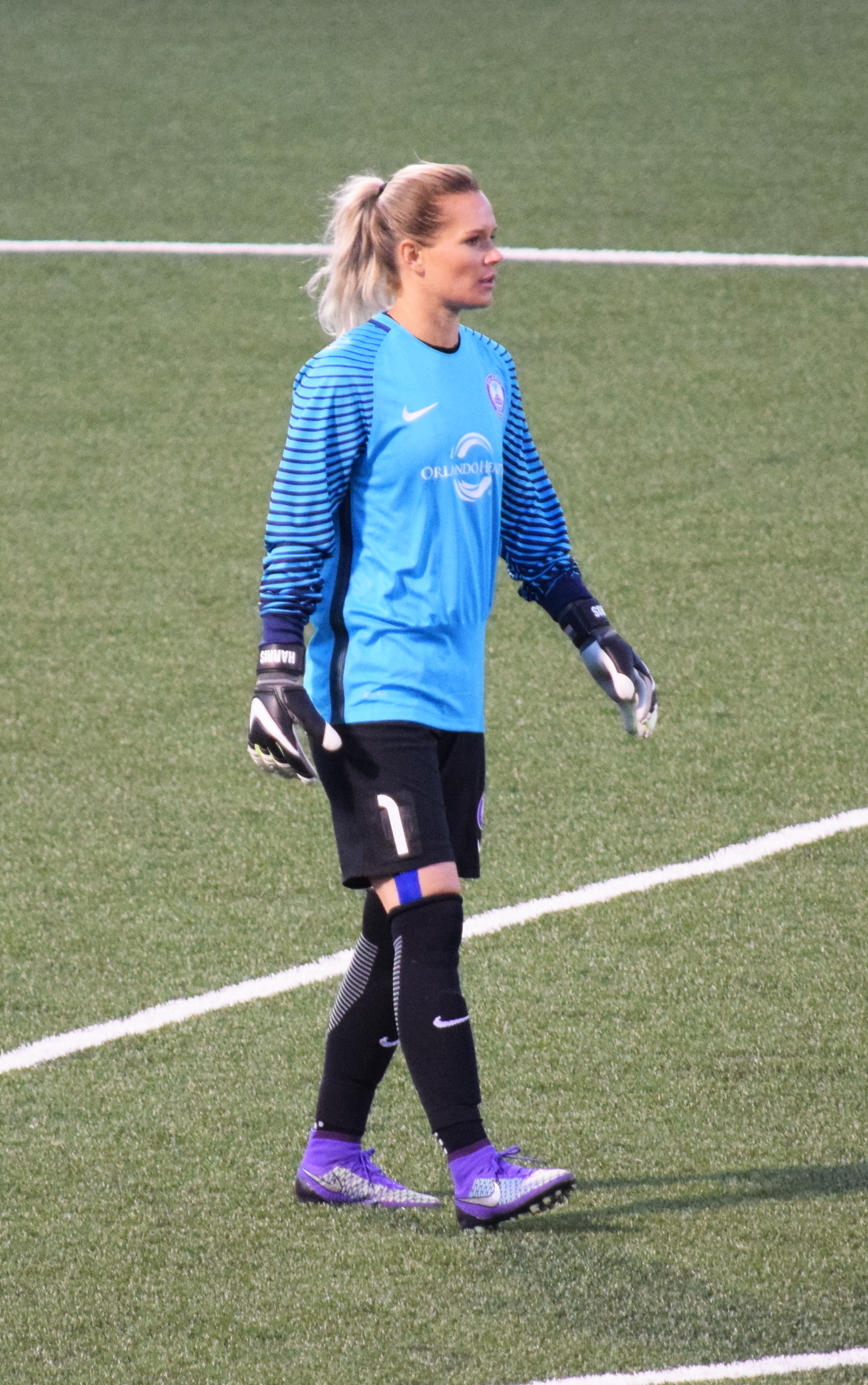
Harris with the Orlando Pride during a match against WNY Flash at Sahlen's Stadium on June 11, 2016

In a match against the Chicago Red Stars on August 2, Harris sustained a concussion. She was officially cleared to play on August 20 and appeared in the Spirit's semifinal game against the Seattle Reign on August 25. The Spirit lost the match 2–1, eliminating them from the playoffs. Harris was nominated for NWSL Goalkeeper of the Year for the 2014 season.

In 2015, Harris missed almost half of the NWSL season due to commitments with the United States women's national team at the 2015 FIFA Women's World Cup in Canada. She returned to the Spirit in late July, appearing in a match against the Chicago Red Stars on July 25, which ended in a 1–1 draw. Harris made nine appearances for the Spirit in the regular season, conceding 12 goals and recording a save percentage of 78%.

The Spirit ended the season in fourth place, clinching a spot in the playoffs. They faced Seattle Reign in the semifinals on September 13. Harris conceded three goals during the match, resulting in a 3–0 win for the Reign and elimination from the playoffs for the Spirit.

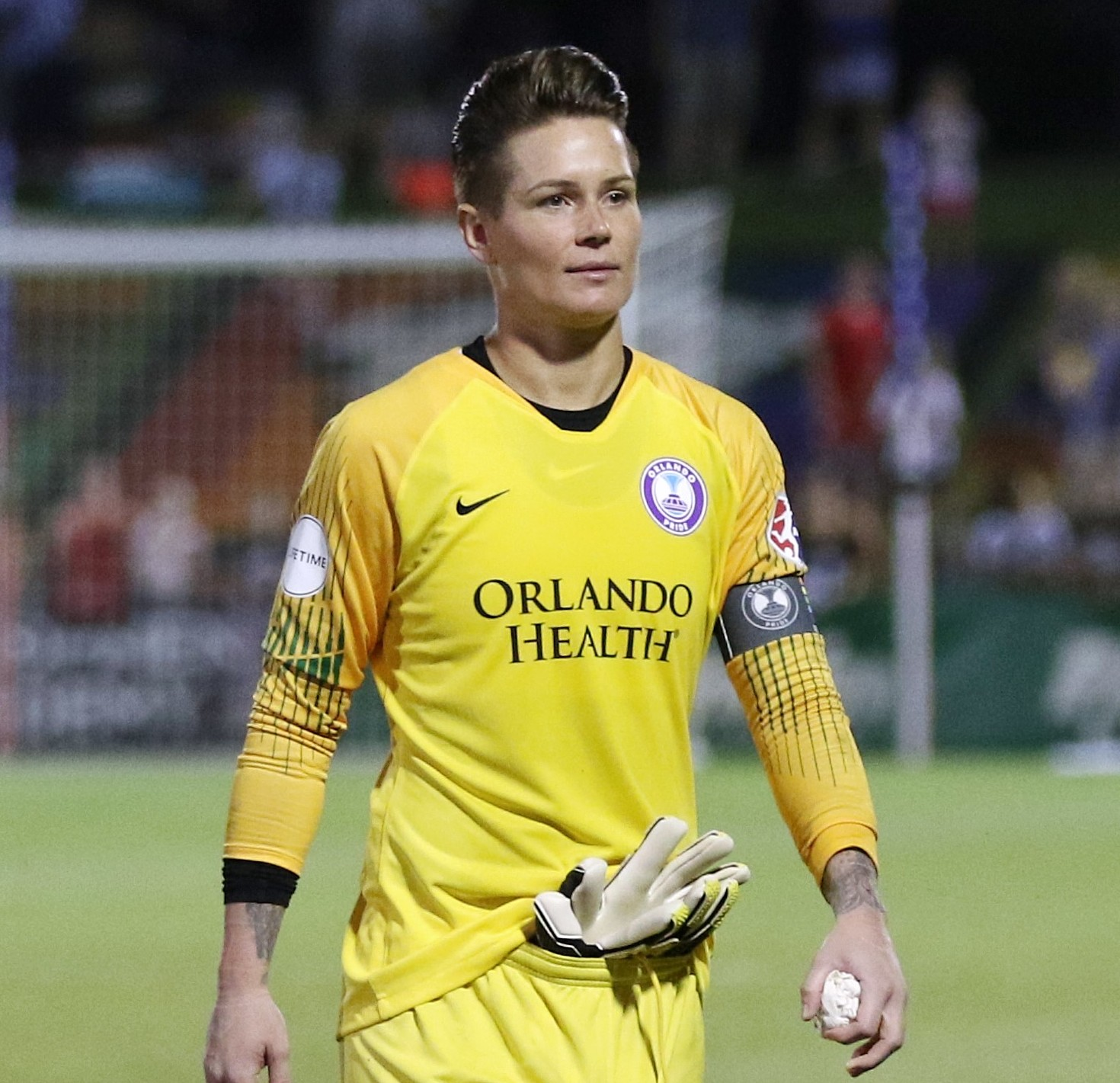
Harris with Orlando Pride in June 2018

=== Orlando Pride, 2016–2021 ===
On October 20, 2015, the Orlando Pride officially became the tenth team in the National Women's Soccer League. Shortly after, the Washington Spirit announced that they would be leaving Harris unprotected for the 2015 Expansion Draft, giving the Orlando Pride the opportunity to select Harris for their roster for the 2016 season. On November 2, the Pride selected Harris with their second pick in the 2015 Expansion Draft.

Harris made her first appearance for the Pride on April 17 in a match against the Portland Thorns, a 2–1 loss. Harris was named NWSL Goalkeeper of the Year in 2016; she made 62 saves and had a 1.33 goals-against-average in 15 games. She was also named to the 2016 NWSL Best XI.

In 2017 Harris only appeared in 14 games for Orlando, as she suffered a quad injury that forced her to miss 8 weeks. Orlando finished 3rd in the regular season standings, and qualified for the playoffs. They lost 4–1 to Portland in the playoff semifinal.

Harris played 21 games in the 2018 season. She recorded 4 clean sheets and 70 saves. Orlando could not replicate their 2017 success, and finished in 7th place, outside of playoff qualification.

Harris started the 2019 season by winning the first NWSL Save of the Week. Orlando ended the season in 9th place.

During the 2021 NWSL Challenge Cup, Harris saved penalties in back to back games against Gotham FC and the Washington Spirit. She registered nine saves in total during the 1–0 win over Washington (only one fewer than the club's single-match save record that she set in April 2017) to help the Pride's to their first victory in 609 days. On August 29, 2021, Harris set a new NWSL all-time career save record with her 469th save during a 1–0 win over Gotham FC. The previous record was held by Nicole Barnhart.

=== NJ/NY Gotham FC, 2022 ===
On December 6, 2021, Harris was traded alongside Ali Krieger to Gotham FC in exchange for a first-round pick in the 2022 NWSL Draft, a third-round pick in the 2023 NWSL Draft and $50,000 in allocation money.

On November 14, 2022, Harris announced her professional retirement from soccer at the Player's Ball in New York City.

== International career ==
=== Youth national teams, 2000–06 ===
In 1999, Harris attended the United States U-14 Girls' National Team Identification Camp. She represented the United States as a member of the U-16, U-17, and U-19 teams in 2000.

==== Under-19 women's national team ====
Harris made 11 appearances for the U-19 team in 2001; she started nine of those matches, recording four shutouts. Of the 11 appearances, two were international matches. Harris started off 2001 with a WUSA preseason exhibition match on March 25 against the Boston Breakers in Chula Vista, California. She conceded one goal during the match, resulting in a 1–0 victory for the Breakers. Harris then made appearances in two matches against the Canadian U-19 national team on June 30 and July 2. Harris joined the U-19 national team for an eight-day training camp in December 2001 at the U.S. Olympic Training Center in San Diego, California.

In January 2002, Harris attended a training camp with the U-19 national team at the ARCO Olympic Training Center in Chula Vista, California. In early March, Harris was included on the roster for a two-game tour of Mexico, during which she participated in matches against Costa Rica and Mexico. She recorded a shutout in the 4–0 victory over Costa Rica and conceded one goal against Mexico, giving a 2–1 win to the United States. From March 17 to 23, Harris and the U-19 team joined the San Jose CyberRays, San Diego Spirit, the United States U-21 national team, and the United States National Amateur team for the WUSA pre-season tournament. Harris also appeared in the two warmup games before the CONCACAF qualifying tournament.

On April 18, 2002, United States U-19 national team head coach Tracey Leone named Harris to the 18-player roster for the CONCACAF qualifying tournament. The tournament was held from May 7 to 11 and served as a qualification for the inaugural FIFA U-19 Women's World Championship. The round-robin tournament featured games against Suriname, Haiti, and Costa Rica. Harris started in all three matches, recording shutouts against Suriname and Haiti, conceding one goal against Costa Rica. The United States won their group and hence qualified for the U-19 Women's World Championship.

Following the CONCACAF tournament, Harris joined the U-19 team on a 15-day tour of Europe in June that included matches against Germany's U-19 and U-21 teams, Sweden's U-19 team, Frauen-Bundesliga team Duisburg, and Damallsvenskan team Hammarby IF. In July, Harris was named to the 27-player roster for a 13-day training camp at the U.S. Olympic Training Center in San Diego. Following the training camp, Harris was subsequently named to the U-19 team that would represent the United States at the U-19 Women's World Championship in late August.

At the age of 16, Harris was the youngest member on the United States team at the U-19 Women's World Championship. The tournament was held in Canada from August 17 to September 1. Harris started in all six matches for the United States during the tournament. In the group stage she conceded one goal, during the opening match against England. She then recorded two shut outs, against Australia and Chinese Taipei respectively. The United States faced Denmark in the quarterfinals on August 25, where Harris once again recorded a shutout. She conceded one goal against Germany in the semifinals on August 29; with a final score of 4—1, the US progressed to the final. During the final, the United States faced Canada. Harris posted another shut out for a 1–0 victory in overtime. Harris made eight total shutouts in 15 appearances for the U-19 team in 2002.

In January 2003, Harris trained with the U-19 national team at the ARCO U.S. Olympic Training Center. In February, Harris was on the roster for a two-game series against the Mexican women's national team. She then joined the national team once again for a training camp in April. While there, the team played a match against the San Diego Spirit.

Harris was briefly called up to the U-21 national team for a 13-day training camp and four-game tour of Brazil in May. Two of the games were against Brazil's U-21 team and the two others were against Santos FC and Saad FC. Harris was one of only two players on the roster that were not yet in college.

Following the training camp, Harris moved back down to the U-19 team, where she was a member of the roster for the USYS Cup in late May. Harris started in goal during the first match of the tournament against Canada on May 27 in a 6–1 win.

After her appearance in the tournament, Harris once again joined the U-21 team. On July 9, she was named to the 18-player team that would represent the United States at the 2003 Nordic Cup in Denmark. She started the team's first match against Denmark on July 21 and recorded a shut out for a 1–0 victory for the United States. She also appeared in the final game of the tournament on July 27 against Sweden. She conceded one goal during the match and the United States won 2–1, taking the title.

In October 2003, Harris joined the U-19 women's national team for a training camp at the Home Depot Center in Carson, California. The team also played matches against local club teams during the training camp. Harris was again included on the roster for camps between December 2003 and February 2004. Harris was named to the 18-player roster for a two-game series against the Mexican women's national team on February 18 and 20. Having 23 caps with the U-19 team at that point, Harris was the most experienced player on the roster.

Harris was a member of the U-19 national team that played in the Philips Lighting U-19 Women's Soccer Invitational, their first major domestic tournament, from April 6 to 10. In the first match of the tournament, Harris recorded a shut out for a 2–0 win against the Netherlands. She made her second appearance in the tournament during the team's final match against China on April 10. She recorded another shutout for a 4–0 win, giving the United States a second-place finish in the invitational.

On April 28, Harris was named to the 18-player roster that would represent the United States at the CONCACAF U-19 Women's Qualifying Tournament held in Ottawa and Montreal, Canada. Harris was one of four members of the team that were also on the team that won the inaugural FIFA U-19 World Championship in 2002. She was also the most capped U-19 player on the roster. Harris recorded a shutout against Dominican Republic on May 28 for a 14–0 win. She then started in goal against Trinidad & Tobago on May 30. The lone goal for Trinidad & Tobago came during the 86th minute, after Kelsey Davis came on for Harris in the 62nd minute. The United States won the match 11–1, guaranteeing their spot in the semifinals. Harris recorded her second shutout of the tournament on June 1 during the team's final group match against Costa Rica, which ended in a 0–0 draw. In the semifinal match against Mexico on June 4, Harris recorded another shut out. The 6–0 win secured the United States U-19 women's national team a place in the 2004 FIFA U-19 Women's World Championship, although they still had one more match in the tournament. Harris started in the final against Canada on June 6. She made seven saves during the game and conceded two goals. Canada won the match in overtime.

Harris trained with the U-19 national team during camps ahead of the U-19 World Championship.

Harris delayed her enrollment at the University of North Carolina at Chapel Hill in order to train with the U-19 team leading up to the U-19 World Championship in a modified residency program. In the two months leading up to the championship, the team trained together in two-week blocks until they left for the tournament in November.

On October 12, Harris was named to the 21-player roster that would represent the United States at the 2004 FIFA Women's World Championship in Thailand. Harris was captain of the team and played every minute in all six matches of the tournament for the United States. Harris started in the opening group match against South Korea on November 11 and recorded a shut out for a 3–0 win. She conceded one goal during the match against Russia on November 14 in a 4–1 win for the United States. She recorded her second shutout of the tournament on November 18 against Spain in the team's final group match. The United States won 1–0 and was the only team to win all three of its group matches. In the quarterfinals, Harris posted her third shutout in the 2–0 win over Australia on November 21. The United States moved into the semifinals, where they faced Germany on November 24. Harris started in goal and conceded three goals during the match; the Germans took the win and halted the United States' advancement in the tournament. The United States faced Brazil in the third place match, where Harris played all 90 minutes. She made eight saves and recorded her fourth shutout of the tournament. The United States won the game 3–0 and took away third place. Harris was subsequently named to the Tournament All-Star Team by the FIFA Technical Study Group. She was also a 2004 Chevrolet Athlete of the Year Award Finalist.

Harris finished her U-19 career with 39 caps, the most of any United States player. She finished with an all-time U-19 international record of 28–5–2.

==== Under-21 women's national team ====
Harris was called up to a U-21 national team training camp held from March 26 to April 3, 2005. Harris then sustained an ACL injury in the summer which kept her off the field until 2006. She returned to the U-21 national team in June 2006 for a training camp. It was during this training camp that Harris sustained her second ACL injury, this time to her left knee.

=== Senior national team, 2009–2020 ===
Harris received her first call-up to the senior national team for a 12-day training camp held from September 21 to October 2, 2009. It was her first national team training camp since June 2006, when she trained with the U-21 before tearing her ACL. Of her first few days at camp, Harris stated:

I was very nervous at the beginning. I was very stiff, to say the least. But you know what? This is an opportunity of a lifetime and I feel I'm playing well, and all I can ask for is to walk out of here knowing that I did what I was supposed to do. As far as what happens next, it's out of my control. I am just going to keep doing what I have been doing, training hard, and improving every day.

On September 7, 2010, United States women's national team head coach Pia Sundhage named a 30-player roster for two matches against China in October. The roster would then be narrowed down to the 20-player roster for the 2010 CONCACAF Women's World Cup Qualifying tournament. The players would take part in a training camp before the two matches starting on September 20. Although Harris was not one of the four goalkeepers on this preliminary roster, she was called into camp on September 23 to replace Hope Solo, who was recovering from a shoulder surgery. She was then named to the 24-player roster for the team's second match against China on October 6 in Philadelphia, although she did not dress for the match. She was not named to the 20-player roster for the 2010 CONCACAF Women's World Cup Qualifying tournament, but she did travel with the team to train.

Harris was named to a 24-player preliminary roster for a two-game series in November 2010. Harris was then called into a six-day training camp in January 2011 in Carson, California leading up to the 2011 Four Nations Tournament. Because Solo was still out with a shoulder injury and Jill Loyden was out with a broken hand, Harris was named to the roster for the tournament to back-up Nicole Barnhart.

Harris joined the national team for another training camp in Ft. Lauderdale, Florida from February 3 to 9. Following the camp, she was named to the 24-player roster for the 2011 Algarve Cup. She was subsequently named to the roster of 20 players that suited up for the games, although she did not make an appearance. She was on the roster for a match against England on April 2. In late April, Harris trained with the national team for three weeks in final preparations for the 2011 Women's World Cup. Although she did not make the final roster for the World Cup, she joined the team in November for a two-week training camp in Arizona. She also trained with the team in December and January. Following the 2012 CONCACAF Olympic Qualifying Tournament, Harris joined a 28-player roster for a training camp in Frisco, Texas in the week leading up to a match against New Zealand on February 11, although she did not suit up for the game.

On February 17, Harris was named to a 23-player roster for the 2012 Algarve Cup. While in Portugal, Harris played in a closed-door training match against China on February 25, splitting halves with Nicole Barnhart. Harris was not named to the roster of 21 players that suited up for the games in the tournament. Harris traveled with the national team in early April to compete at the Women's Kirin Challenge Cup in Japan. Following the tournament, she trained with the national team in Florida from April 18 to 30. During the training camp, Harris injured her left shoulder, sustaining a small tear in her labrum. She still went on to train with the national team in New Jersey from May 10 to 25. However, in early June, she decided to undergo surgery to repair the tear in order to prevent further damage. The surgery kept her off the pitch for the rest of 2012.

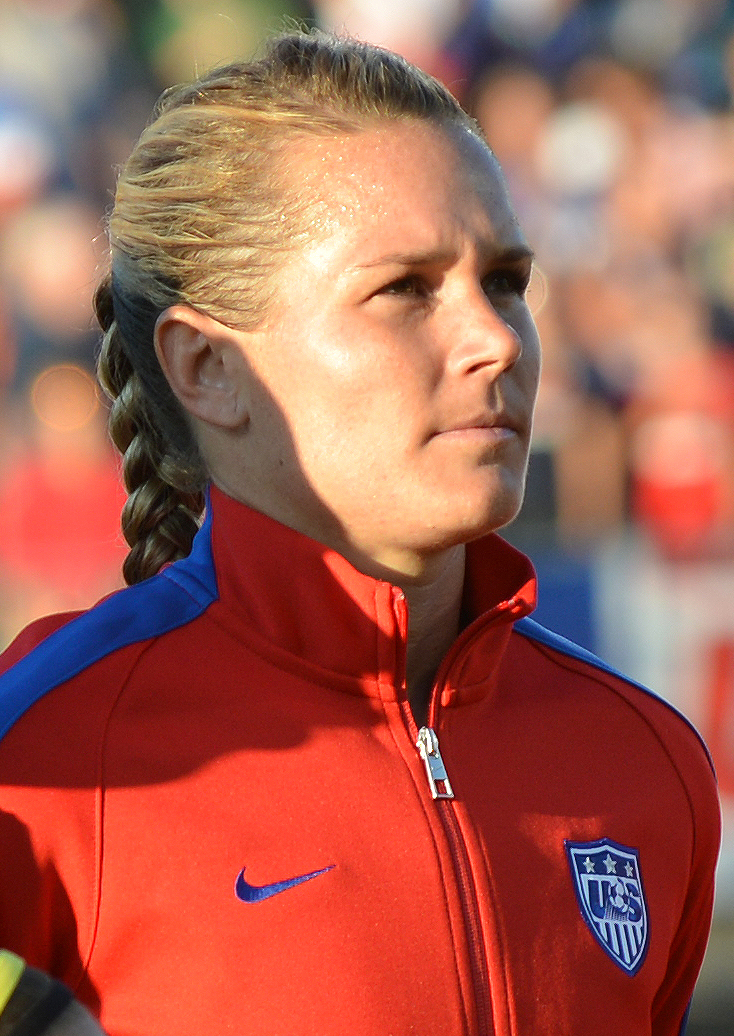
Harris with the United States women's national soccer team in June 2014

In January 2013, Harris was called up to a 29-player training camp leading up to two matches in early February. This was her first time back with the national team following her shoulder surgery the previous June. Following the training camp and matches, Harris was named to the 23-player roster for the 2013 Algarve Cup in Portugal. The team's starting goalkeeper Hope Solo was out with a wrist injury, giving Harris the opportunity to make an appearance in the tournament. She was the only uncapped player on the roster.

On March 11, 2013, Harris earned her first appearance with the senior team in a match against Sweden. Harris played all 90 minutes of the match and conceded one goal in a 1–1 draw. Following the match, head coach Tom Sermanni stated the following regarding Harris's performance:

I think she did well for her first cap. It was a really high pressure game and especially when you lose a goal early on that she had absolutely no chance with. She was put in a few difficult situations during the game and I think she handled them extremely well.

Harris stated that she had "waited a long time for [that] moment" and although she was nervous, she was happy with her performance.

Harris traveled to Europe with the national team for matches against Germany and the Netherlands in early April. Harris made her second appearance for the national team on April 9 against the Netherlands. She conceded one goal during the match for a 3–1 win for the United States. In late May, Harris was named to the 21-player roster that traveled to Canada before facing a match on June 2. She did not suit up for the match.

On December 3, Harris underwent arthroscopic surgery to repair a torn lateral meniscus in her left knee. The injury had affected her play since June and kept her out for a month following the surgery.

Harris returned to the national team in January 2014 for a training camp. Harris was not named to the roster for the 2014 Algarve Cup. In late April, Harris was named to a 22-player roster for a match against Canada on May 8, although she did not dress for the game. She was on the roster for two games in June against France. On June 19, 2014, Harris made her third appearance for the national team in their second game against France. She started and played all 90 minutes, conceding two goals for a 2–2 draw.

Harris was named to a 19-player roster for a match against Switzerland on August 20 in Sandy, Utah. Shortly after, she was replaced on the roster by Alyssa Naeher after suffering a concussion playing for the Washington Spirit. She returned to the national team for a training camp at the end of August in order to prepare for two matches against Mexico in September as well as the 2014 CONCACAF Women's Championship in October. She dressed for both games against Mexico and was subsequently named to the roster for the 2014 CONCACAF Women's Championship that served as a qualification for the 2015 FIFA Women's World Cup. This was the first CONCACAF qualifying roster that Harris made at the senior level. She made her fourth appearance for the national team in team's final group match against Haiti on October 20, 2014, in Washington, D.C. She played all 90 minutes and recorded her first career shutout in a 6–0 win for the United States. The United States went on to win the tournament after a 6–0 win over Costa Rica.

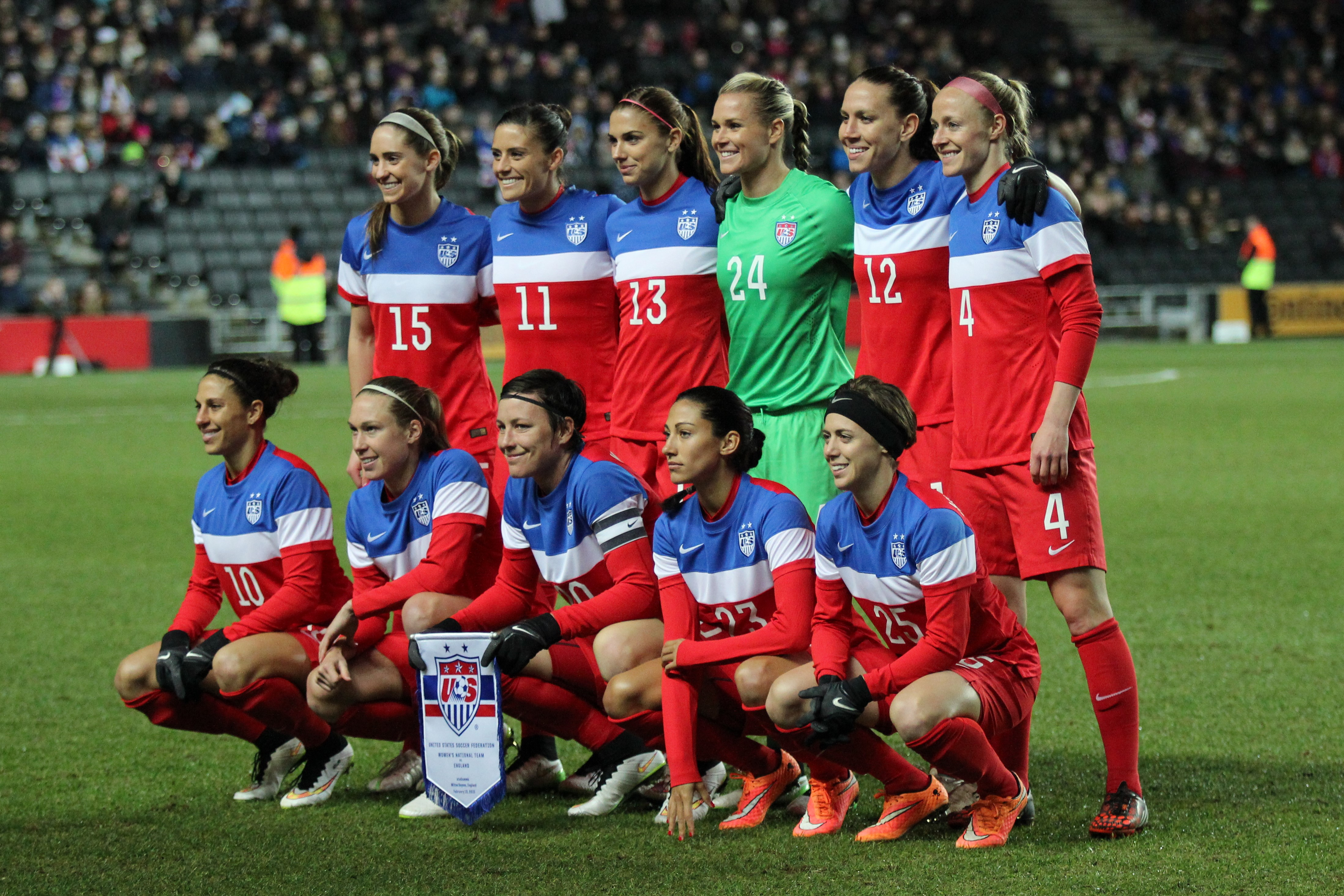
Harris with the United States women's national soccer team before a match against England in 2015

Harris was named to the 24-player roster for the International Tournament of Brasilia in Brazil from December 10 to 21. While in Brazil, Harris sustained a broken pinky finger and underwent surgery in order to repair it. She recovered in time to fully participate in a 21-day training camp in January 2015.

Harris traveled with the team on a 13-day trip to Europe for matches against France and England in mid-February. United States starting goalkeeper Hope Solo was out on suspension during the matches, giving Harris the opportunity to make an appearance. Harris made her fifth appearance for the national team in the match against France on February 8. The United States lost the match 2–0. She also played all 90 minutes in the match against England on February 13, recording a shut out in the 1–0 win and earning her sixth cap.

On February 21, Harris was named to a 25-player roster for the 2015 Algarve Cup in Portugal. She was then named to a 25-player roster on March 20 for a match against New Zealand on April 4 in St. Louis. She was subsequently named as one of the 18 players that would suit up for the match, although she did not make an appearance.

On April 14, 2015, Harris was named to the 23-player roster that would represent the United States at the 2015 FIFA Women's World Cup. She was one of eight members of the team that were making their first World Cup roster. Harris became a World Cup Champion on July 5, when the United States defeated Japan 5–2 in the final. Harris joined the national team on a Victory Tour following their World Cup win that started in Pittsburgh, Pennsylvania on August 16 and ended in New Orleans, Louisiana on December 16. Harris made a start during the first match of the Victory Tour against Costa Rica in an 8–0 win. She also made an appearance in the match against Haiti on September 17, coming in for Solo in the second half. The United States won the match 5–0.

Harris was named to the 26-player roster for the national team's first training camp in 2016. The camp led into a match against Ireland on January 23. Harris suited up for the match but did not make an appearance. Harris was subsequently named to the 20-player roster for 2016 CONCACAF Women's Olympic Qualifying. The United States qualified to the 2016 Olympic Games in Rio de Janeiro after a semifinal win against Trinidad & Tobago on February 19. The United States went on to win the tournament after defeating Canada 2–0.

Harris was named to the roster for the 2016 SheBelieves Cup that took place from March 3 to 9. She then joined a 23-player roster for a training camp ahead of two matches against Colombia in early April. She did not dress for either match. Harris was on the roster for another two-game series against Japan, although she did not suit up for the games.

On July 12, 2016, Harris was named an alternate for the 2016 Olympic Games. Following Hope Solo's suspension after the 2016 Olympics, Harris along with Alyssa Naeher were competing for the U.S. WNT number one keeper spot. Naeher and Harris split the remaining games of 2016 equally.

In 2017 Harris started one game at the 2017 SheBelieves Cup and the Naeher started two. As 2017 progressed, Naeher emerged as the number one keeper for the U.S., and got most of the starts in goal. Due to a quad injury sustained in May, Harris only appeared in 3 games for the U.S in 2017.

In 2018 Harris remained as the back-up keeper to Alyssa Naeher. She was named to the final 20 player roster for the 2018 CONCACAF Women's Championship.

On May 1, 2019, Harris was named to the 23-player roster for the 2019 Women's World Cup. in 2020, Harris was named to the CONCACAF Women's Olympic Qualifying for Tokyo 2020. The team qualified for the Tokyo Olympics 2020 (postponed to summer 2021) in 1st place after beating Canada 3–0 in the final. Harris was also named on the roster for the SheBelieves Cup 2020.

== In popular culture ==
=== Video games ===
Harris was featured along with her national teammates in the EA Sports' FIFA video game series in FIFA 16, the first time women players were included in the game.

=== Honors ===
Following the United States' win at the 2015 FIFA Women's World Cup, Harris and her teammates became the first women's sports team to be honored with a Ticker Tape Parade in New York City. Each player received a key to the city from Mayor Bill de Blasio. In October of the same year, the team was honored by President Barack Obama at the White House.

== Personal life ==
Off the field, Harris is known for her distinct sense of style and extensive tattoos and has professed having interests in fashion, music, surfing, and skateboarding. In August 2017, it was announced that she had signed a multi-year endorsement deal with Umbro as its first female brand ambassador. In its announcement of the endorsement, the brand noted that the deal would "usher in a new era for the modern consumer focused on on-field and off-field apparel" and that Harris had been involved in styling her first marketing shoot with the brand. Harris had previously been sponsored by Nike.

Harris has publicly shared her experiences with depression, aggression, and Adderall addiction as a youth and young adult, and is heavily involved with the mental health-focused non-profit To Write Love on Her Arms. In May 2016, Harris spoke out in support of Aniya Wolf, a teenager from Pennsylvania who had been barred from her Catholic high school's prom after planning to wear a suit. A Central Florida native, Harris has on a number of occasions expressed support for the victims, families, and communities affected by the June 2016 massacre at the Pulse nightclub in Orlando. Like many of her U.S. women's national team teammates, Harris has spoken of the sexism faced by female athletes and the importance of improving their pay and conditions.

In December 2016, Harris and national team coach Jill Ellis travelled to Liberia as part of the U.S. State Department's Sports Envoy program. In addition to participating in meetings with government officials in support of women's sports, Harris and Ellis worked closely with students at the Monrovia Football Academy. While Harris does not have formal coaching experience, she has led goalkeeper training sessions in conjunction with Orlando Pride teammate Ali Krieger's youth camps.

Harris was in a relationship with former USWNT teammate Ali Krieger from 2010 to 2023. In March 2019, they announced their engagement via People Magazine. Harris and Krieger married on December 28, 2019, in Miami. Megan Rapinoe, who played a role in the couple's coming out, served as Harris's maid of honor. On February 14, 2021, the couple announced the adoption of their daughter, born two days earlier. On August 16, 2022, they announced the adoption of their son. On September 19, 2023, Harris filed for divorce in Seminole County, Florida.

She has been in a relationship with actress Sophia Bush since 2023 and they made their red carpet debut at the 2024 White House Correspondents Dinner in Washington, D.C. In September 2026, Bush revealed in her memoir that she and Harris had secretly married in an intimate ceremony in upstate New York during the summer of 2025.

== Career statistics ==
As of matches played November 11, 2023

Appearances and goals by club, season and competition
Club	Season	Leagues			National Cup (Note: Includes DFB-Pokal Frauen, Svenska Cupen Women, NWSL Challenge Cup)		Continental (Note: Includes UEFA Women's Champions League)		Total	
Club	Season	Division	Apps	Goals	Apps	Goals	Apps	Goals	Apps	Goals
Washington Freedom	2010	WPS	10	0	—		—		10	0
Western New York Flash	2011	WPS	19	0	—		—		19	0
FCR 2001 Duisburg	2012–13	FRB	7	0	1	0	—		8	0
Washington Spirit	2013	NWSL	18	0	—		—		18	0
Tyresö FF (loan)	2013	DAM	7	0	—		4	0	11	0
Tyresö FF (loan)	Total		61	0	1	0	4	0	66	0
Washington Spirit	2014	NWSL	20	0	—		—		20	0
Washington Spirit	2015	NWSL	10	0	—		—		10	0
Orlando Pride	2016	NWSL	15	0	—		—		15	0
Orlando Pride	2017	NWSL	14	0	—		—		14	0
Orlando Pride	2018	NWSL	21	0	—		—		21	0
Orlando Pride	2019	NWSL	13	0	—		—		13	0
Orlando Pride	2020	NWSL	3	0	—		—		3	0
Orlando Pride	2021	NWSL	19	0	4	0	—		23	0
NJ/NY Gotham FC	2022	NWSL	8	0	—		—		8	0
NJ/NY Gotham FC	Total		123	0	4	0	—		127	0
Career Total			184	0	5	0	4	0	193	0

== Honors and awards ==
North Carolina Tar Heels

- NCAA women's soccer championship: 2006, 2008, 2009

Western New York Flash

- Women's Professional Soccer Championship: 2011

United States U20

- CONCACAF Women's U-19 Qualifying Tournament: 2002
- FIFA U-19 Women's World Championship: 2002

United States

- FIFA Women's World Cup: 2015, 2019
- CONCACAF Women's Championship: 2014, 2018
- CONCACAF Women's Olympic Qualifying Tournament: 2016; 2020
- Algarve Cup: 2011, 2013, 2015
- SheBelieves Cup: 2016, 2018, 2020
- Tournament of Nations: 2018

Individual

- National Soccer Coaches Association of America Player of the Year: 2004
- NSCAA All-American: 2001–2004
- Parade Magazine All-American: 2001–2004
- Parade Magazine Player of the Year: 2004
- Gatorade Player of the Year: 2004
- NWSL Goalkeeper of the Year: 2016
- NWSL Best XI: 2016
- WPS Goalkeeper of the Year: 2011
- WPS Best XI: 2011
