= C. J. Hobgood =

American surfer

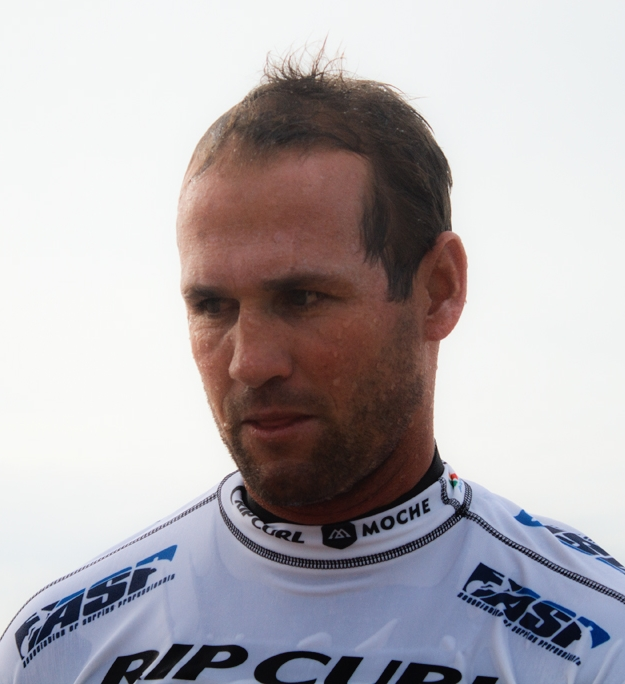
- Professional surfer C. J. Hobgood of Satellite Beach, Florida

Personal information
- Nickname: CJ
- Born: Clifton James Hobgood; July 6, 1979 (age 47) Melbourne, Florida, United States
- Years active: 1999–2015
- Height: 5 ft 9 in (175 cm)
- Weight: 149 lb (68 kg)
- Website: www.hobgoods.com

Surfing career
- Sport: Surfing
- Best year: Champion – 2001
- Sponsors: Globe, Smith eyewear, Vestal Watches, FCS fins, DaKine, To Write Love On Her Arms, Quiet Flight Surfboards
- Major achievements: ASP World Tour Champion 2001; ASP World Tour Rookie of the Year 1999; 2008 ISA World Surfing Games Champion

Surfing specifications
- Stance: Goofy
- Shaper: Bruce Regan
- Favorite maneuvers: Airs and Barrels

Clifton James Hobgood (born July 6, 1979) is an Association of Surfing Professionals (ASP) World Championship surfer. He has a twin brother, Damien. They both compete in top-tier professional surfing events around the world.

Hobgood entered his first surfing contest in 1989 and made the Open Boys final. He placed second in a national competition the following year. He won several other championships and in 1998 he was selected as the model for the new National Scholastic Surfing Association logo. In 1999, CJ was the Association Surfer Professionals Rookie of the Year. In 2001 he won the WSL World Championship. He currently resides in Satellite Beach, Florida, with his wife and daughter, near his younger brother Travis, his younger sister Marissa, and his parents.

Along with surfing, Hobgood also plays tennis, and his filmography includes Noah's Ark, The Outsiders produced by Walkingonwater.org, Down the Barrel (2007), Inaugural Hobgood Challenge (2007), Somewhere, Anywhere, Everywhere. He has won the 2007 US Open of Surfing. He has also won the O'Neill World Cup of Surfing at Sunset Beach, Part of the Van's Triple Crown of Surfing Competition, in Hawaii in 2008.

The Hobgoods both graduated from Satellite High School in 1997. Also, they previously operated The Goods Surf and Skate in Indialantic, Florida.

He joined the Christian surfers movement.

WSL Championship Tour Event Wins
Year	Event	Venue	Country
2000	Quiksilver Pro France	Hossegor	France
2004	Billabong Pro Tahiti	Teahupoo	French Polynesia
2004	Quiksilver Pro Japan	Chiba	Japan
2008	Billabong Pro Mundaka	Mundaka	Spain

Achievements
Preceded by Sunny Garcia	Association of Surfing Professionals World Champion (men's); 2001	Succeeded by Andy Irons
