= Satellite Beach, Florida =

City in Florida, U.S.

- City
- City of Satellite Beach
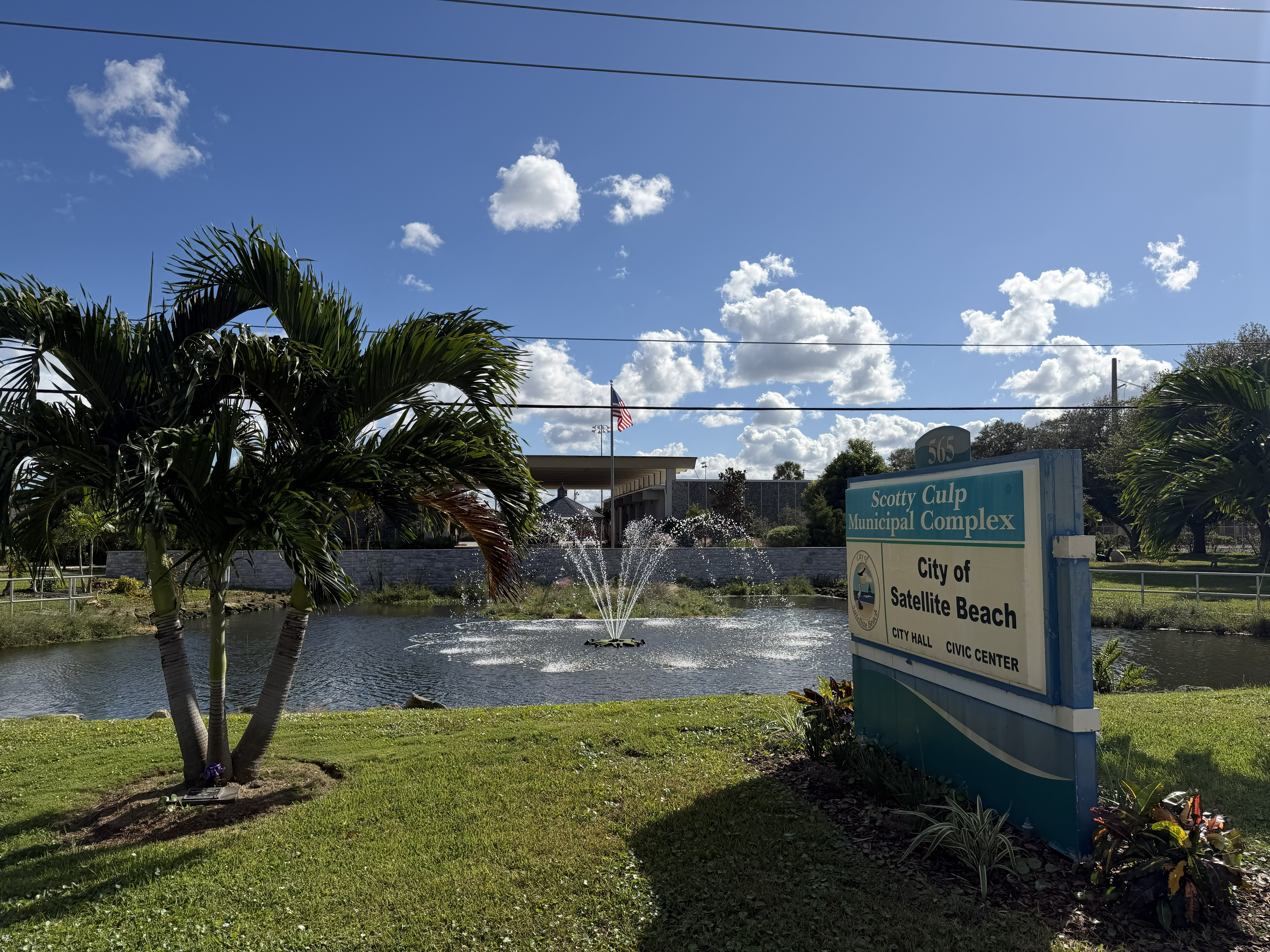
- Satellite Beach City Hall

- Flag Seal

- Location in Brevard County and the state of Florida
- Coordinates: 28°10′24″N 80°35′48″W
- Country: United States
- State: Florida
- County: Brevard
- Incorporated: 1957

Government
  - Type: Council-Manager
  - Mayor: Steve Osmer
  - Vice Mayor: Jodi Rozycki
  - Councilmembers: Mark Boyd, Mike Chase, and Stephen Sams
  - City Manager: Brittany Retherford
  - City Clerk: Gwen Peirce

Area
  - Total: 4.29 sq mi (11.10 km^{2})
  - Land: 2.92 sq mi (7.56 km^{2})
  - Water: 1.37 sq mi (3.54 km^{2})
- Elevation: 13 ft (4 m)

Population (2020)
  - Total: 11,226
  - Density: 3,843.6/sq mi (1,484.02/km^{2})
- 11,056
- Time zone: UTC-5 (Eastern (EST))
  - Summer (DST): UTC-4 (EDT)
- ZIP code: 32937
- Area code: 321
- FIPS code: 12-64400
- GNIS feature ID: 0290694
- Website: www.satellitebeach.gov

Satellite Beach is a coastal city in Brevard County, Florida, U.S. The population was 11,226 at the 2020 United States census, up from 10,109 at the 2010 census, and it is located with the Atlantic Ocean to the east and the Banana River to the west. Satellite Beach is part of the Palm Bay–Melbourne–Titusville, Florida Metropolitan Statistical Area.

== Geography ==
Satellite Beach is located at 28°10′24″N 80°35′48″W (28.173441, –80.596674). According to the United States Census Bureau, the city has a total area of 4.3 square miles (11.1 km^{2}). 2.9 square miles (7.6 km^{2}) of it is land and 1.4 square miles (3.5 km^{2}) of it (31.94%) is water.

The Atlantic Ocean forms its eastern border; the Indian River the western border. It is located on the local barrier island directly south of Patrick Space Force Base. It is part of the South Beaches.

With both ocean and river frontage, the city is the largest beachside community in South Brevard County. There are 7.7 miles (12.4 km) of shoreline in the city, including 2.8 miles (4.5 km) of Atlantic Ocean beach, 1.3 miles (2.1 km) of Banana River shoreline, and 3.6 miles (5.8 km) of shoreline fronting navigable canals connected to the Banana River.

=== Climate ===
Satellite Beach is located in the region where tropical and temperate climatic zones overlap. A study commissioned by NASA lends credence to the perception that Satellite Beach is located in a portion of the North American Atlantic shoreline with a reduced incidence of catastrophic hurricanes. Extremes range from 24 °F (−4 °C) on December 24, 1989 to 99 °F (37 °C) on July 15, 1981.

Climate data for Satellite Beach (1987–2018 normals, extremes 1945–present)
Month	Jan	Feb	Mar	Apr	May	Jun	Jul	Aug	Sep	Oct	Nov	Dec	Year
Record high °F (°C)	86 (30)	88 (31)	93 (34)	96 (36)	96 (36)	98 (37)	99 (37)	98 (37)	95 (35)	93 (34)	90 (32)	87 (31)	99 (37)
Mean daily maximum °F (°C)	70 (21)	71 (22)	75 (24)	79 (26)	82 (28)	86 (30)	87 (31)	88 (31)	87 (31)	82 (28)	77 (25)	72 (22)	80 (27)
Daily mean °F (°C)	63 (17)	65 (18)	68 (20)	73 (23)	77 (25)	80 (27)	82 (28)	82 (28)	82 (28)	77 (25)	71 (22)	66 (19)	74 (23)
Mean daily minimum °F (°C)	57 (14)	58 (14)	62 (17)	67 (19)	72 (22)	75 (24)	77 (25)	77 (25)	77 (25)	73 (23)	66 (19)	60 (16)	68 (20)
Mean minimum °F (°C)	40 (4)	43 (6)	48 (9)	56 (13)	65 (18)	70 (21)	72 (22)	73 (23)	72 (22)	59 (15)	50 (10)	44 (7)	36 (2)
Record low °F (°C)	25 (−4)	32 (0)	29 (−2)	46 (8)	53 (12)	66 (19)	67 (19)	68 (20)	66 (19)	49 (9)	33 (1)	24 (−4)	24 (−4)
Average precipitation inches (mm)	1.80 (46)	1.63 (41)	1.53 (39)	1.60 (41)	2.51 (64)	4.93 (125)	4.55 (116)	3.90 (99)	5.19 (132)	3.12 (79)	1.86 (47)	1.58 (40)	34.2 (869)
Source: Weather Underground

=== Fauna ===
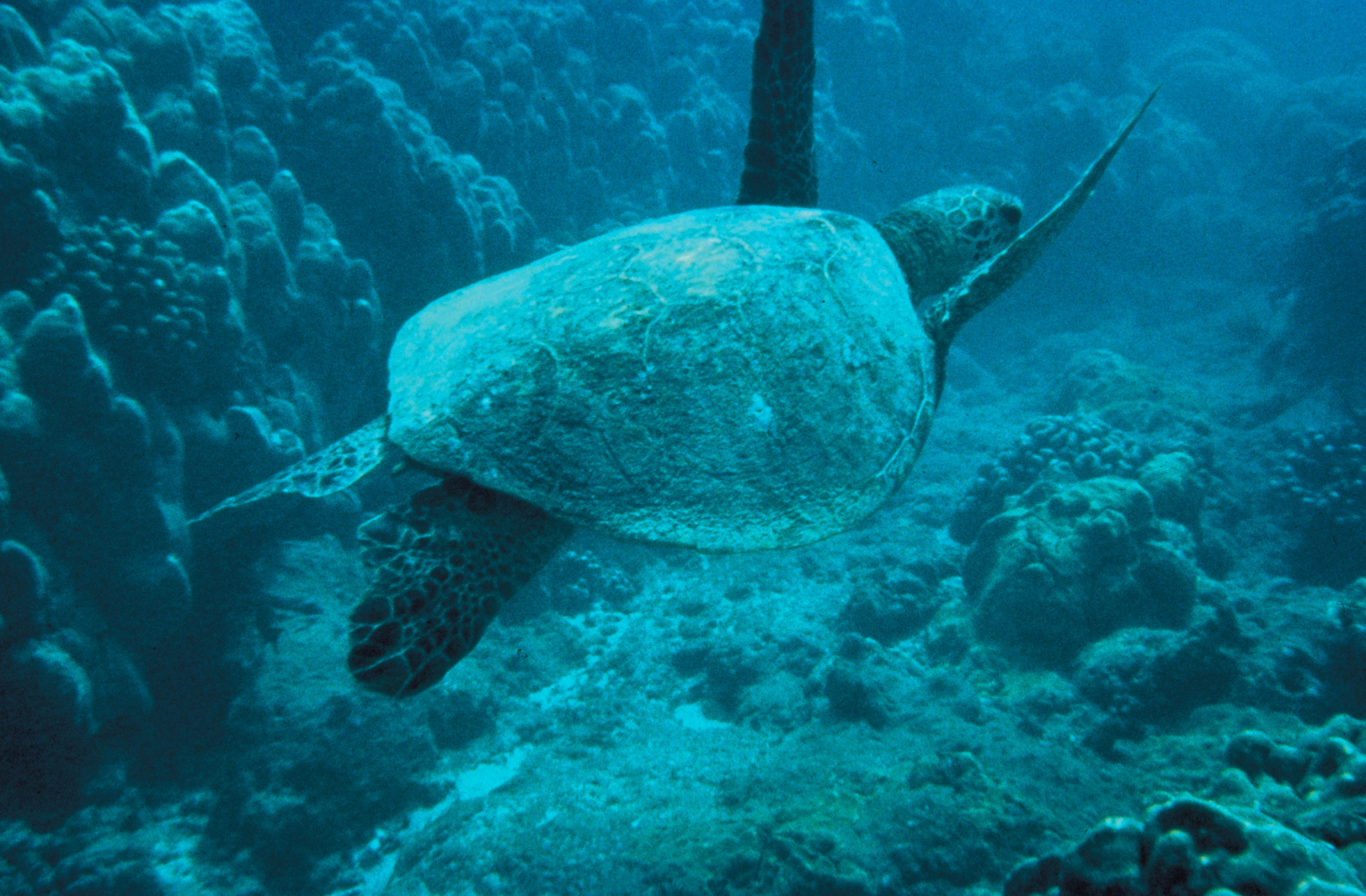
Green sea turtle

Threatened Atlantic loggerhead sea turtles nest on the city's ocean beaches at densities of approximately one nest per 10 feet (3.0 m) of shoreline per year. Endangered green sea turtles also deposit nests along the city's ocean beach each year.

Endangered North Atlantic right whales calve off the city's shoreline. Endangered West Indian manatees frequent the city's canals and the Banana River. Bald eagles forage over Samsons Island.

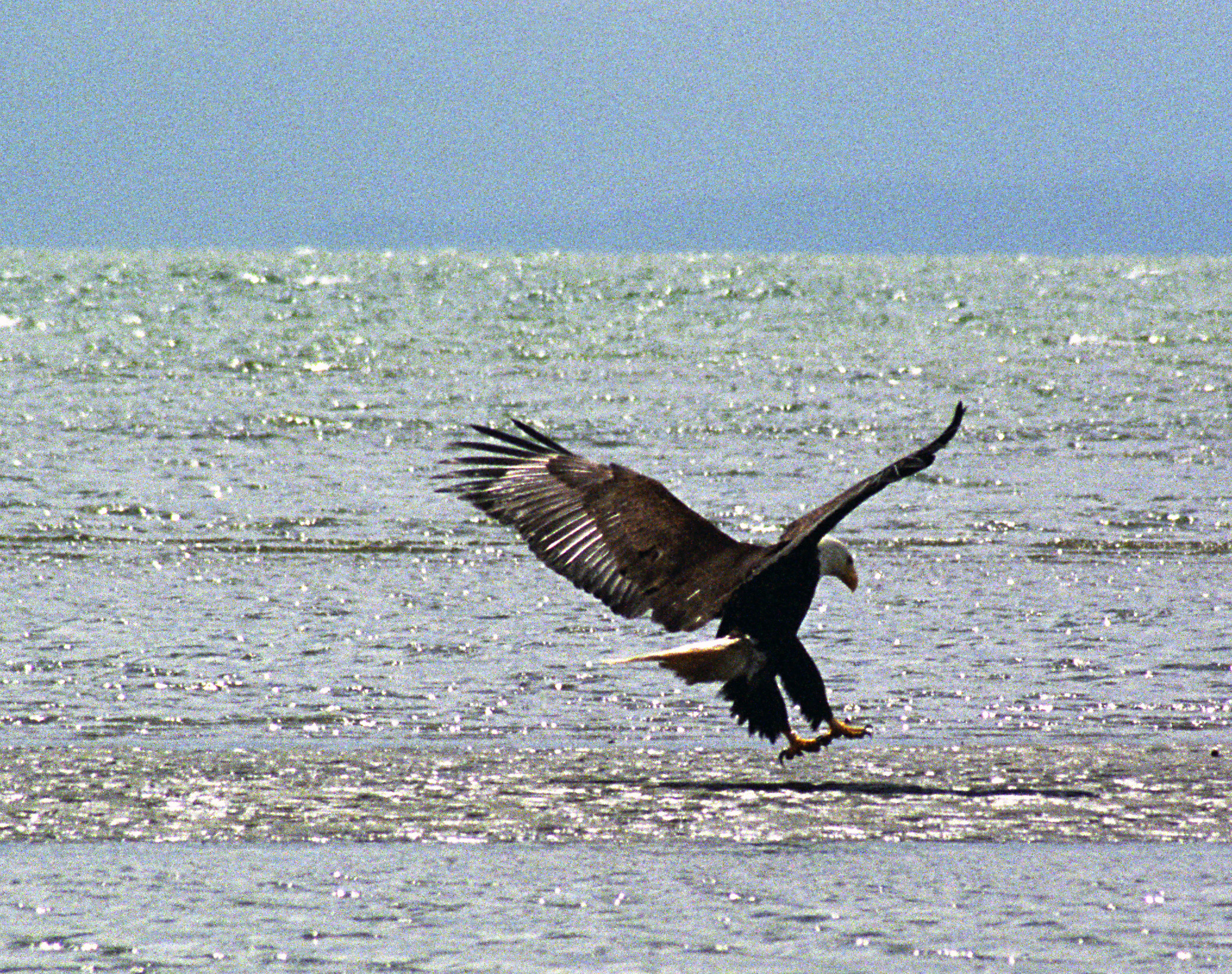
Wild bald eagle

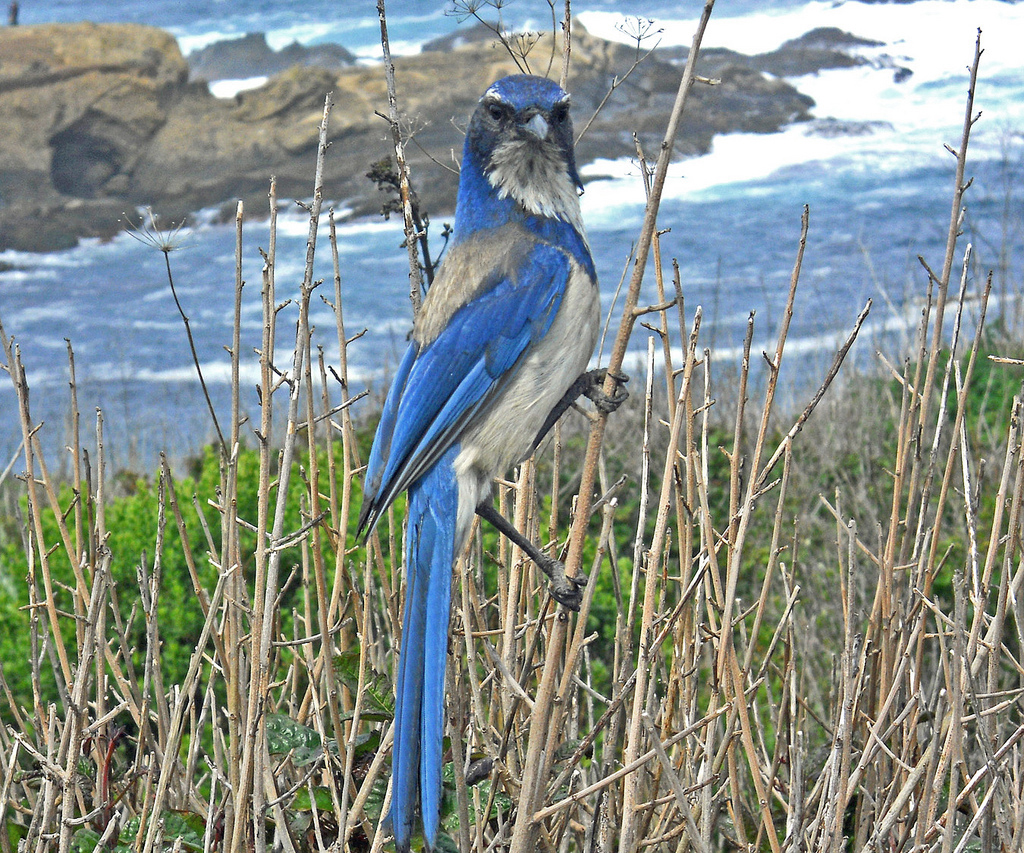
Scrub jay

The 12 acres (4.9 ha) of wetland created as mitigation by a local developer on Samsons Island provide nutrient-rich, sheltered aquatic habitat serving as finfish nursery and feeding ground for a diverse assemblage of birds and mammals. The city established Samsons Island Nature Park, the only gopher tortoise relocation recipient site on the barrier island. It is occupied by 42 relocated tortoises and three which had been living on the island when development began. The city has erected five osprey nesting platforms on Samsons Island Nature Park, from which young have been fledged.

Efforts are now under way to create habitat for use by gopher tortoises and scrub jays. Xeric scrub around the local county library, until the late 1990s, hosted a family of threatened Florida scrub jays.

The city is working with faculty of the Florida Institute of Technology to promote graduate student research and class projects on Samsons Island Nature Park and to assist in devising and implementing maintenance programs to preserve and enhance desirable wildlife habitats.

The city has approved the use of inland dirt-officially called upland sources-to be used in beach nourishment projects. These projects will bury part of a natural reef. After three projects, the sea shells are gone, and turtle nesting declined significantly in the years following this nourishment.

=== Flora ===
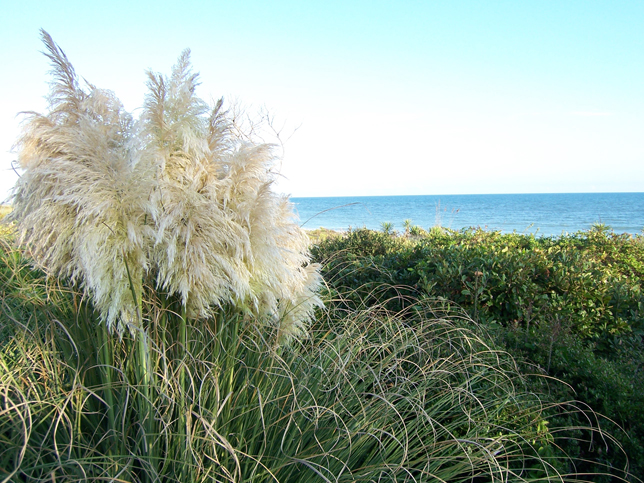
Sea oats

Due to the moderating influence of surrounding water bodies, the climate on the barrier island supports tropical species of plants normally found far to the south. Brevard County's barrier island to, approximately, Cape Canaveral, constitutes the northernmost limit of the range of many of these plant species. At the same time, the infrequency and mildness of freezes in the Central Florida region serves to define the southern limit of many plants found in temperate zones. Vegetated sand dunes are found along most of the beach's length and provide the major defense against storm events. Native plant species found on the dunes include sea oats, Sabal palmetto, sea grape, railroad vine, dollar weed, coral bean, Spanish bayonet, wax myrtle, yaupon holly, and several grass species. More salt-tolerant and wind-tolerant species, such as sea oats and railroad vine, are found predominantly on the ocean side of the dune, while other dune vegetation species do not generally show such zonation. These plants assist in building the dune by trapping windblown sand and in stabilizing the dune with extensive lateral root systems.

=== Geology ===
There are approximately 10 acres (4.0 ha) of coquina rock outcrops frequently exposed along the low-tide line of the city's ocean beach. The National Marine Fisheries Service has classified the rock as an Essential Fish Habitat-Habitat Area of Particular Concern. It is important to aquatic life and found only in a few locations along the Eastern seaboard.

On the city's ocean beach can be found fossil Atlantic ghost crabs, the remnants of a unique set of geological circumstances which preserved these creatures when they died in their burrows perhaps about 110,000 years ago.

There are significant deposits of sand, marl, coquina and possibly phosphate within the city limits.

== History ==
Satellite Beach became incorporated in 1957 by Percy L. Hedgecock and his brothers, B. D. (Shine) and Herbert (Hub) Hedgecock, along with cousins Jimmy Caudle and Dumont Smith. Hedgecock also served as the town's first mayor from 1957 until 1973.

In 2010, the city began planning for a rise in sea level resulting from climate change.

As of 2011, volunteers have provided more than 10,000 hours each year to youth and public service programs.

In 2011, the city became one of the first areas in the United States to install solar panels on municipal buildings.

In 2013, the city announced that it would undertake $36 million worth of work to restore beach areas and dunes along the coast, battered by hurricanes in 2004. The project was underwritten by Brevard County and the Florida Department of Environmental Protection.

As of 2013, the only traditional Jewish synagogue, Chabad of the Space & Treasure Coasts, along the Brevard County coastline is in the city.

On December 4, 2013, there was a parade in celebration of the Jewish holiday of Hanukkah. There were one hundred Menorah-topped vehicles, a Menorah lighting, free food (including traditional Latkes), and live entertainment.

As of 2013, the annual Ocean, Reef, and Beach Festival is organized by the Surfrider Foundation, Pure Ocean TV Productions and Anglers for Conservation.

As of 2013, Banana River Sail and Power Squadron sponsors the annual Holiday Boat Parade.

On December 20, 2013, the city announced plans to build a beachside trail that would allow people to walk, jog and cycle along the coast. The proposed trail would run along the dunes south from Fischer Park. The beachside trail would hook up to the proposed 40 miles (64 km) "A1A Urban Trail".

In the summer of 2018, Erin Brockovich hosted a town hall to address citizens concerns that ground contamination from an old military dump was causing increased rates of cancer. These concerns were validated when County health officials released a report the following summer that showed a higher incidence of some rare cancers and again when the U.S. Department of Defense designated an area just blocks north of the city as a "Formerly Used Defense Site". While no direct link between the cancer cases and contamination had been established as of January 2020, officials and activists were still working on the issue. A renewed interest in this issue was prompted when an oncologist who graduated from Satellite High School in 2003 noticed that an unusually high number of her classmates were getting cancer and dying.

== Demographics ==
Historical population
Census	Pop.	Note	%±
1960	825		—
1970	6,558		694.9%
1980	9,163		39.7%
1990	9,889		7.9%
2000	9,577		−3.2%
2010	10,109		5.6%
2020	11,226		11.0%
U.S. Decennial Census

=== Racial and ethnic composition ===
Satellite Beach racial composition (Hispanics excluded from racial categories) (NH = Non-Hispanic)
Race	Pop 2010	Pop 2020	% 2010	% 2020
White (NH)	8,943	9,199	88.47%	81.94%
Black or African American (NH)	187	197	1.85%	1.75%
Native American or Alaska Native (NH)	21	21	0.21%	0.19%
Asian (NH)	173	243	1.71%	2.16%
Pacific Islander or Native Hawaiian (NH)	5	16	0.05%	0.14%
Some other race (NH)	25	74	0.25%	0.66%
Two or more races/Multiracial (NH)	168	605	1.95%	5.39%
Hispanic or Latino (any race)	587	871	5.81%	7.76%
Total	10,109	11,226		

=== 2020 census ===
As of the 2020 census, Satellite Beach had a population of 11,226. The median age was 46.3 years. 21.7% of residents were under the age of 18 and 21.7% of residents were 65 years of age or older. For every 100 females there were 96.8 males, and for every 100 females age 18 and over there were 94.9 males age 18 and over.

100.0% of residents lived in urban areas, while 0.0% lived in rural areas.

There were 4,549 households in Satellite Beach, of which 30.2% had children under the age of 18 living in them. Of all households, 56.9% were married-couple households, 15.7% were households with a male householder and no spouse or partner present, and 22.2% were households with a female householder and no spouse or partner present. About 23.9% of all households were made up of individuals and 12.8% had someone living alone who was 65 years of age or older.

There were 5,116 housing units, of which 11.1% were vacant. The homeowner vacancy rate was 2.0% and the rental vacancy rate was 9.6%.

=== 2020 profile ===
In 2020, the ancestries with the highest percentages (excluding Latino groups) was 15.4% Irish, 14.2% Italian, 10.5% German, 9.5% English, 4.0% Polish, 2.4% French, 1.7% Scottish, 1.5% Norwegian, and 0.4% Sub-Saharan African.

In 2020, the median household income was $92,750, with families having $107,525, married couples having $116,295, and non-families having $53,888. 3.6% of the population were in poverty. The per capita income was $45,646. The population density was 3,843.2 inhabitants per square mile.

=== 2010 census ===
As of the 2010 United States census, there were 10,109 people, 4,340 households, and 2,853 families residing in the city.

=== 2000 census ===
As of the census of 2000, there were 9,577 people, 3,952 households, and 2,877 families residing in the city. The population density was 4,030.6 inhabitants per square mile (1,556.2/km^{2}). There were 4,257 housing units at an average density of 1,791.6 per square mile (691.7/km^{2}). The racial makeup of the city was 94.99% White, 1.02% African American, 0.18% Native American, 1.55% Asian, 0.03% Pacific Islander, 0.67% from other races, and 1.57% from two or more races. Hispanic or Latino people of any race were 2.95% of the population. Of the city's 7,444 residents who are 25 or older, approximately one in five hold a graduate or professional degree.

In 2000, there were 3,952 households, out of which 26.8% had children under 18 living with them, 60.3% were married couples living together, 9.2% had a female householder with no husband present, and 27.2% were non-families. 22.5% of all households were made up of individuals, and 10.7% had someone living alone who was 65 years of age or older. The average household size was 2.42 and the average family size was 2.83.

In 2000, in the city, the population was distributed by age groups as follows: 21.8% under the age of 18, 5.3% from 18 to 24, 23.0% from 25 to 44, 28.3% from 45 to 64, and 21.5% who were 65 years of age or older. The median age was 45 years. For every 100 females, there were 95.0 males. For every 100 females age 18 and over, there were 92.3 males.

== Government ==
In 2007, the city had a taxable real estate base of $877.12 million.

The city maintains an active list of about 80 volunteers ("Neighbor Helping Neighbor" program) who helps out where requested, often senior citizens, whose mobility is impaired.

There is a portion of property of the Patrick Space Force Base located in the Satellite Beach city limits.

== Education ==
The city has the following schools:

- Brevard Public Schools:
  - DeLaura Middle School
  - Satellite High School
  - Holland Elementary
  - Surfside Elementary
  - Seapark Elementary
- Private schools:
  - Chabad Hebrew School
  - Coastal Community School
  - Torah Academy Preschool

== Recreation ==
The city has several parks, recreational facilities and natural landscapes, however in recent years the lagoon has been severely degraded by recurring algae blooms.

In 2013, Hightower Beach Park was renovated by a community partnership with Montecito Community Development District and state funds from the Florida Preservation 2000 and Florida Land and Water grant programs. The 15 acres (6.1 ha) park contains the natural dune system and has a boardwalk along the coastline. Surfers use the beach.

RC's Beach and Buccaneer Beach are named for a former Royal Castle hamburger kiosk and the Buccaneer Condos, respectively. They are used for surfing.

The David R. Schechter Community Center is a recreational community center. It hosts gatherings, community special events, classes, programs, and other activities.

Pelican Beach Park was renovated in 2007. During the summer months, the Sea Turtle Preservation Society conducts weekly sea turtle tours. The north dune crossover is called "Pelican" by the local surfers.

The DeSoto Recreation Complex features eight tennis courts as well as two enclosed racquetball courts.

Samsons Island is a 52-acre (21 ha) park. It was renovated from an island overrun with exotic plants. Volunteers have worked since 1991 to develop it. It is only accessible by boat. There are butterflies, gopher tortoises, armadillos, squirrels and snakes—black racers and coachwhips. There are 30 species of birds. The island contains trails, bird watching, camping areas, wildlife, and picnic areas. Samsons Island has trails for biking and hiking. There is canal dredging taking place to remove potentially toxic muck.

The Satellite Beach Sports and Recreation Park contains 35 acres (14 ha). It has a walking trail, skate park, dog park, frisbee fields, soccer fields and volleyball courts.

Gemini Beach Park is a 2 acres (0.81 ha) park nestled between Ellwood and Park Avenue and contains dunes, sea turtles, and birdlife.

== Economy ==
=== Personal income ===
In 2011, the median income for a household in the city was $60,870, and median family income was $75,159. 25% of households and 32% of families made more than $100,000. Males had a median income of $42,079 versus $28,259 for females. The per capita income for the city was $27,181. About 2.7% of families and 4.5% of the population were below the poverty line, including 4.2% of those under age 18 and 4.8% of those age 65 or over.

In 2020, the median income for a household in the city was $79,082. The per capita income of all residents for the city was $41,566. About 4.9% of the population was reported to be below the poverty line.

== Satellite Beach Library ==
During the 1960s, Brevard county's population soared due to the Aerospace program and the demands on libraries increased, resulting in the need for more branches. There were many members of the community that expressed the need for a branch in Satellite Beach. A site was selected by the City of Satellite Beach on Cassia Boulevard. A head librarian was selected to run the branch with a volunteer staff. The library's initial budget was $50,000. The Satellite Beach Public Library opened on April 17, 1966.

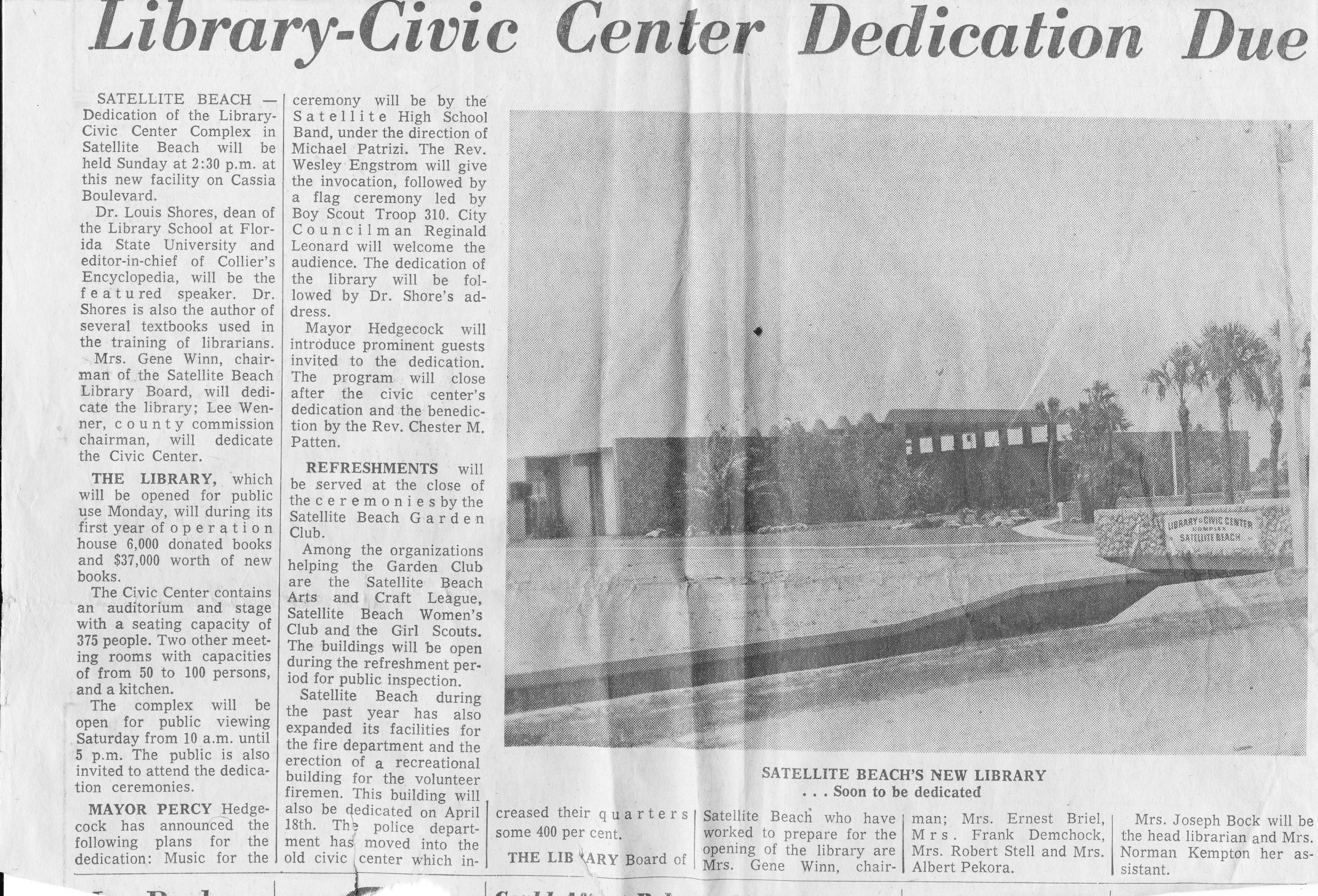
Library Civic Center Dedication April 1966

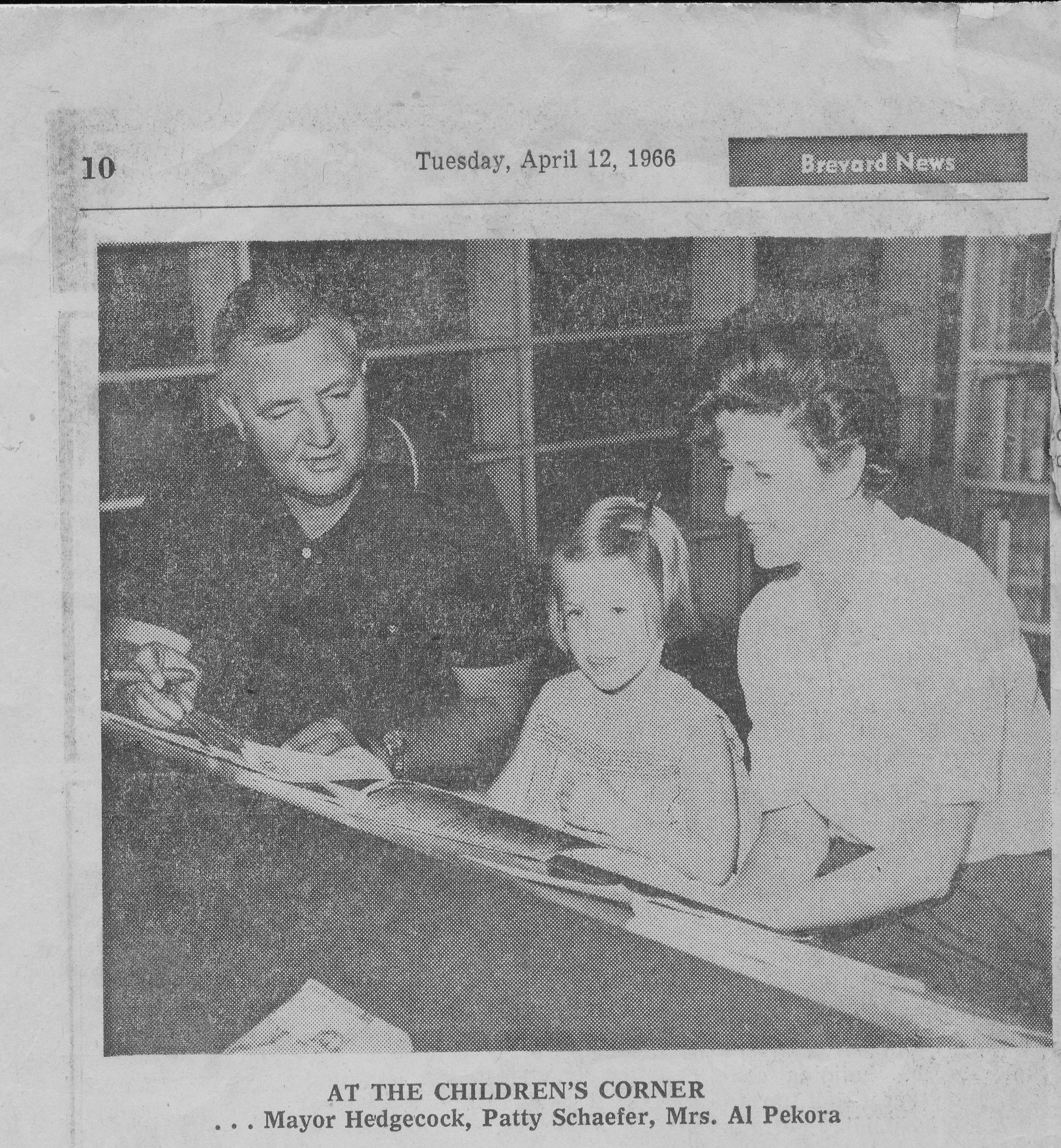
File:Mayor Hedgecock Patty Schaefer Mrs. Al Pekora week of Library Dedication 4 17 1966.jpg

The location eventually outgrew the initial building. In 1991, a new 19,000 square foot facility was completed for the Satellite Beach Public Library at the site of the old Indian Harbor Beach Sewer Treatment Plant property. The land was purchased by the County at a cost of $75,000 and increased the size of the library from 6,500 square feet to 19,000 square feet. The new facility opened on September 23, 1991, on Jamaica Boulevard.

At this time, there were 18,266 registered patrons with a monthly circulation averaging 22,000. There are approximately 63,891 volumes in the book collection of fiction, non-fiction, and reference. There are 2,200 recordings and cassettes and 1269 video tapes. A collection of compact discs have also been added. The new facility offers a Community Meeting Room, children's area and young adult section, study rooms, and public typewriter.

== Infrastructure ==
=== Roads ===
Travelocity.com named route A1A as the "Best Driving Route" in Florida. This runs close to the ocean. A secondary major route, paralleling it, is South Patrick Drive, which is close to the Banana River.

The Florida Department of Transportation maintains 513, and A1A.

See State Roads in Florida for explanation of numbering system.

- SR A1A – The main road through Satellite Beach. There is no local name. The major east–west road, Cassia Bouelvard, intersects both it and SR 513.
- SR 513 – Known locally as South Patrick Drive, this is a parallel route to SR A1A.

=== Canals ===
There are several canals that connect the city to the Indian River Lagoon, including: The Grand Canal, the canal paralleling Desoto Parkway, and the Anchor Drive Canal.

Beach ‘Nourishment’

Every five years Brevard County conduct a dune renourishment project on the beach in an effort to preserve the natural coastline.” While proponents of beach renourishment defend the action as a way to preserve the natural coastline, prevent coastal armoring of properties, and protect natural sea turtle nesting habitat; some residents who oppose it say it's wasteful and ruins the quality of the beach.

== Notable people ==
- Buzz Aldrin, Apollo 11 astronaut, resides in Satellite Beach
- John Antoon, United States District Court judge
- LtGen Alexander R. Bolling, commander of the 84th Infantry Division in World War II and later commander of the Third Army
- David Max Eichhorn, Jewish philosopher, contributing author to Encyclopædia Britannica, Chaplain in the US Army whose company liberated Dachau concentration camp. Resided in Satellite Beach
- Larry Guarino, spent eight years as a POW in the Hanoi Hilton during the Vietnam War
- Ashlyn Harris, goalkeeper for the USWNT and the Orlando Pride
- C. J. Hobgood, 2001 ASP World Champion Surfer
- Damien Hobgood, professional surfer
- Younghill Kang, novelist; died there December 14, 1972
- Kelly Kretschman, USA Women's Softball Team gold medalist
- Nicholas Lindheim, professional golfer
- Ryan Ludwick, left fielder for Cincinnati Reds baseball team; born here on July 13, 1978
- Aprilynne Pike, #1 New York Times bestselling author
- Thomas P. Stafford, Apollo 10 astronaut
- Tim Wakefield, MLB Pitcher and World Series winner who played 19 seasons in the majors, primarily with the Boston Red Sox
- Leonard Weaver, fullback for the Philadelphia Eagles; played football at Satellite High School
