= Damien Hobgood =

American surfer

Damien Hobgood is a professional surfer from Satellite Beach, Florida. He is known for having once held the highest two-wave grand final score in pro surfing by scoring 19.9 out of 20 at The Quiksilver Pro Fiji in 2004 until Kelly Slater eclipsed it the following year at Teahupo'o in the final with a perfect 20. He is also known for his starring role in the autobiographical documentary film "And Two If By Sea" narrated by comedian Daniel Tosh.

== Biography ==
Damien Hobgood is a professional surfer from Satellite Beach, Florida. He grew up with his identical twin brother C.J. Hobgood and both were drawn to the ocean and the sport of surfing at an early age. The competitiveness between the two of them grew as they began to enter amateur surf contests. Both Damien and CJ went on to win local E.S.A. (Eastern Surfing Association) and national N.S.S.A. (National Scholastic Surfing Association) surf contests setting the stage for them both to turn professional right out of high school. Damien and CJ both caught the eye of up and coming surf brand Rusty where they were picked up for sponsorship and sent on surf trips for video and photo coverage. The surf media and mainstream media began to publicize both Damien and CJ, where they received coverage in surf publications such as Surfer Magazine, Surfer Magazine, Eastern Surf Magazine and national coverage in USA Today and Rolling Stone. Damien and CJ both turned professional right out of high school with their eyes set on qualifying for the world championship tour. Damien not only won 2000 WCT rookie of the year but also was the 2004 Quiksilver Pro Fiji Winner, 2005 Santa Catarina Pro Winner, 2006 Globe Fiji Pro Winner, 2007 Billabong Pro Tahiti Winner. He is known for holding one of the highest two-wave scores in pro surfing by scoring 19.9 out of 20 in the 2004 Quiksilver pro where he defeated Andy Irons. Damien remained on the World Championship Tour for 14 years. He then went on to compete on the 2015 WSL Big Wave Tour. Both Damien and CJ still surf professionally and work with clothing brand Salty Crew. Damien also is a participant in “Camp Hobgood” where he and his brother continue to mentor younger surfers. Damien and CJ are also a part of “Desert Surf”, a world-class wave pool resort being built in Palm Springs set to open in 2022. In August 2019, the World Surf League held an honorary Heritage Heat for CJ and Damien to compete against each other at the Hurley Tahiti Pro. A place where both of them are still two of the most winning professional surfers of all time. The heat was also a marketing tie into their 2019 a documentary film entitled “And Two If By Sea” which chronicles their lives as each other's rivals but also biggest supporters. The film is narrated by comedian Daniel Tosh of Comedy Central's television show “Tosh.0”. It won several film festivals and was toured around America before being sold to 1091 Media and distributed digitally worldwide on Amazon, Apple TV, iTunes, Google Play, Xbox, Vudu, Vimeo On Demand, & Fandango On Demand.

== Personal life ==
Hobgood is married to Charlotte Hobgood and have a daughter Savanna Grace born on July 29, 2006, in San Diego, California, as well as a son Colt born in August 2009.
