= Organic architecture =

Philosophy of architecture

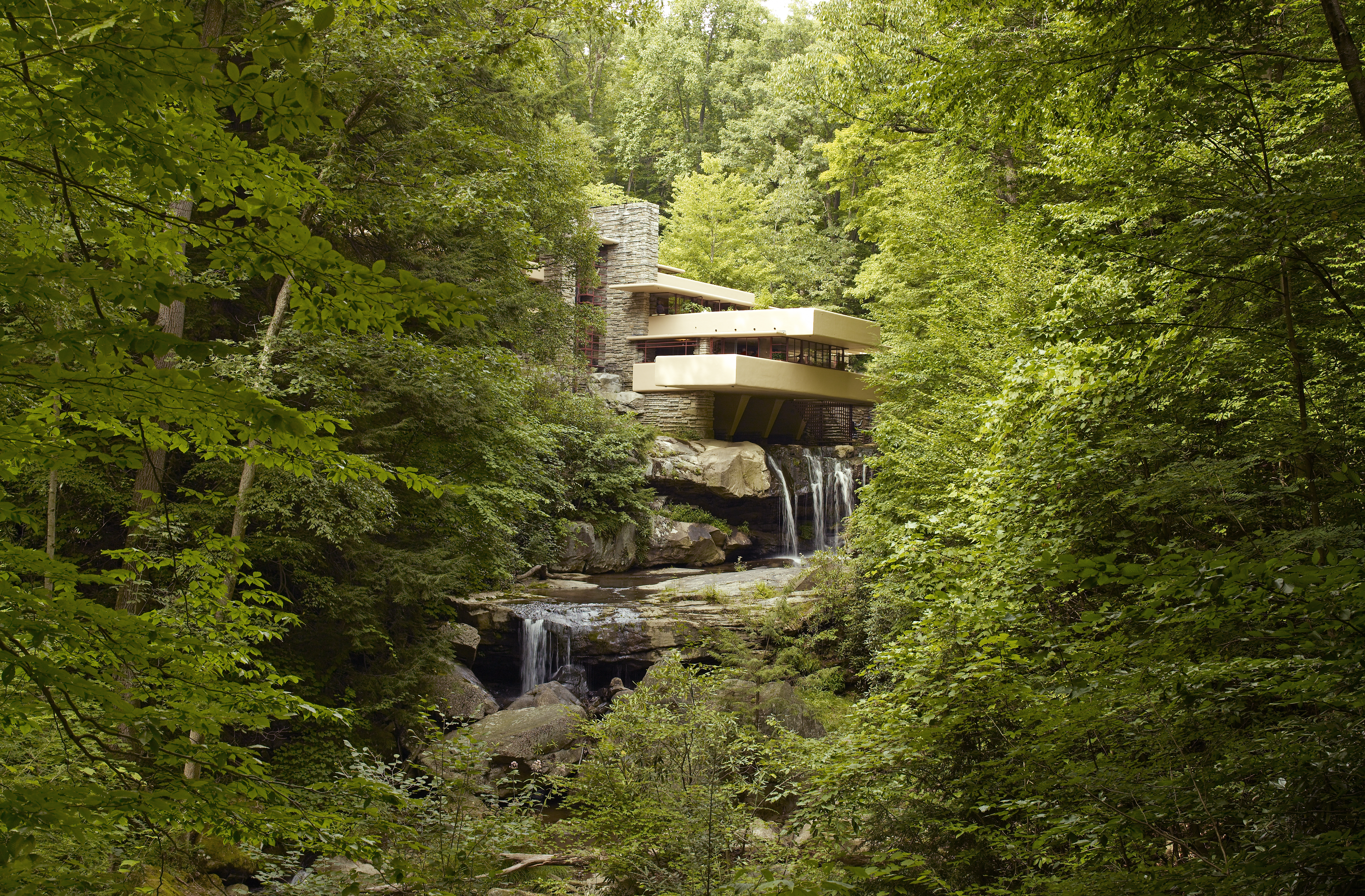
Fallingwater by Frank Lloyd Wright

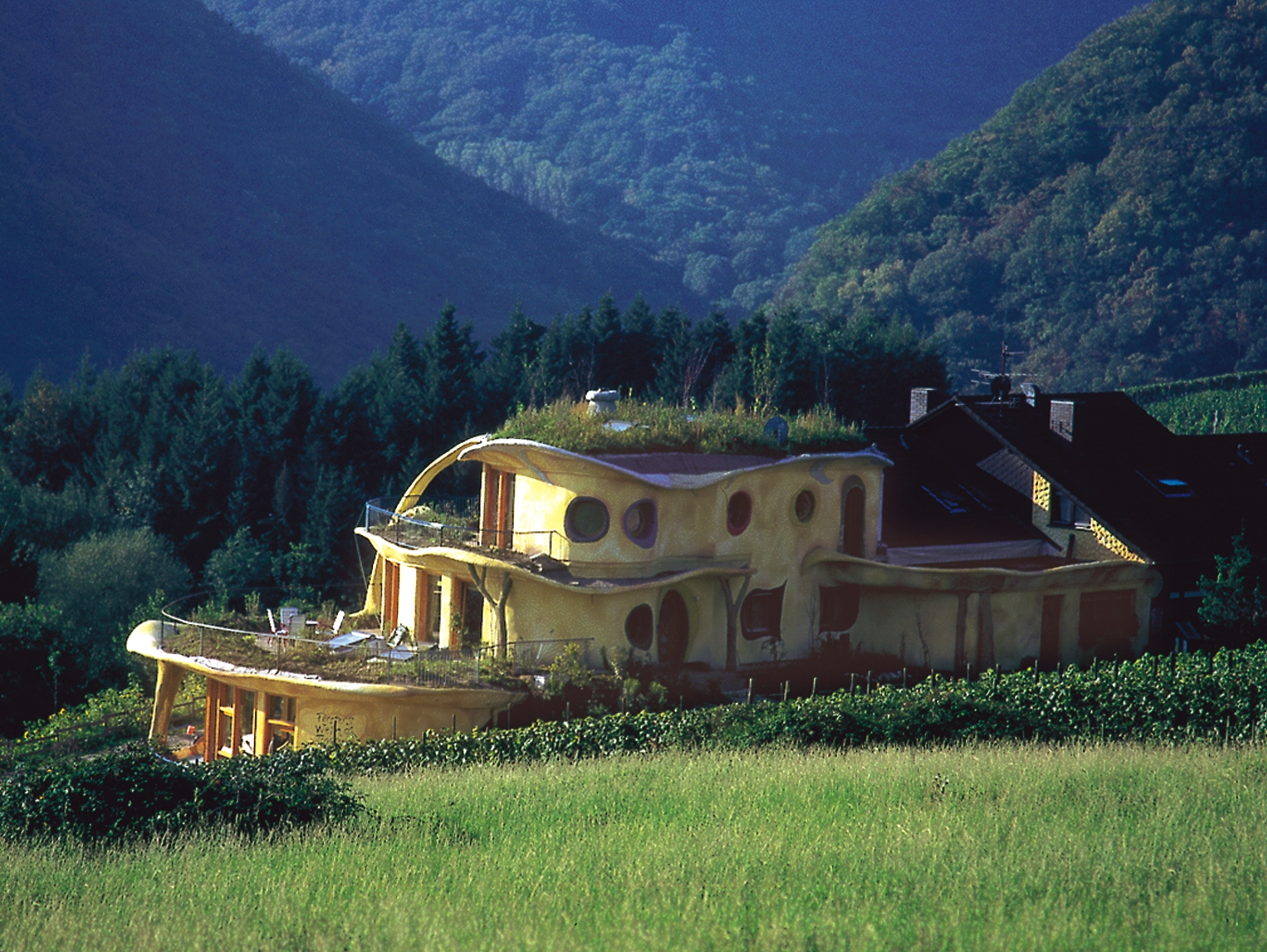
Försters Weinterrassen by Udo Heimermann, Bad Neuenahr-Ahrweiler (2000)

Organic architecture is a philosophy of architecture which promotes harmony between human habitation and the natural world. This is achieved through design approaches that aim to be sympathetic and well-integrated with a site, so buildings, furnishings, and surroundings become part of a unified, interrelated composition.

== History ==
=== Frank Lloyd Wright ===
The term "organic architecture" was coined by Frank Lloyd Wright (1867–1959); it was a continuation and nuancing of the principles of his master, Louis Sullivan, whose slogan "form follows function" became contemporary architecture's watchwords. Wright altered the statement to "form and function are one," citing nature as the clearest illustration of such integration. A consistent thread runs across his whole body of work, which the architect refers to as 'Organic Architecture'. In this situation, some people view the term 'organic' as a synonym for 'natural,' connecting Organic Architecture with the use of curved and free forms, replicating natural shapes, or using environmentally friendly materials. This is to misinterpret the term. While natural materials are frequently used in Organic Architecture to strengthen the link between the interior and the outside world, this is a result rather than a philosophy. In actuality, Organic Architecture is not a stylistic or aesthetic movement, but rather a specific technique or, more accurately, a philosophy.

Wright created Fallingwater, which best demonstrates his organic architecture philosophy: the harmonious union of art and nature. Fallingwater is the residence Wright designed for the Kaufmann family in rural Pennsylvania. Wright had many choices to locate a home on this large site but chose to place the home directly over the waterfall and creek creating a close, clamorous dialog with the rushing water and the steep site. The horizontal striations of stone masonry with cantilevers of colored beige concrete blend with native rock outcroppings and the wooded environment.

==== Japanese architecture ====
The primary components of organic architecture, which result in the inner harmony of an architectural building, are paradigmatic for Japanese architecture. Throughout history, those values have been defined and positioned at the forefront of total harmony, which has become the essence of Japanese culture. Using Japanese architecture as an example, Wright was able to verify the validity and solidity of his organic architecture ideas. Wright believed that traditional Japanese architecture embodied many of his theory's 'organic' qualities. When Wright created his designs in Japan, he attracted pupils and admirers, and his influence on the development of Japanese architecture is still felt today.

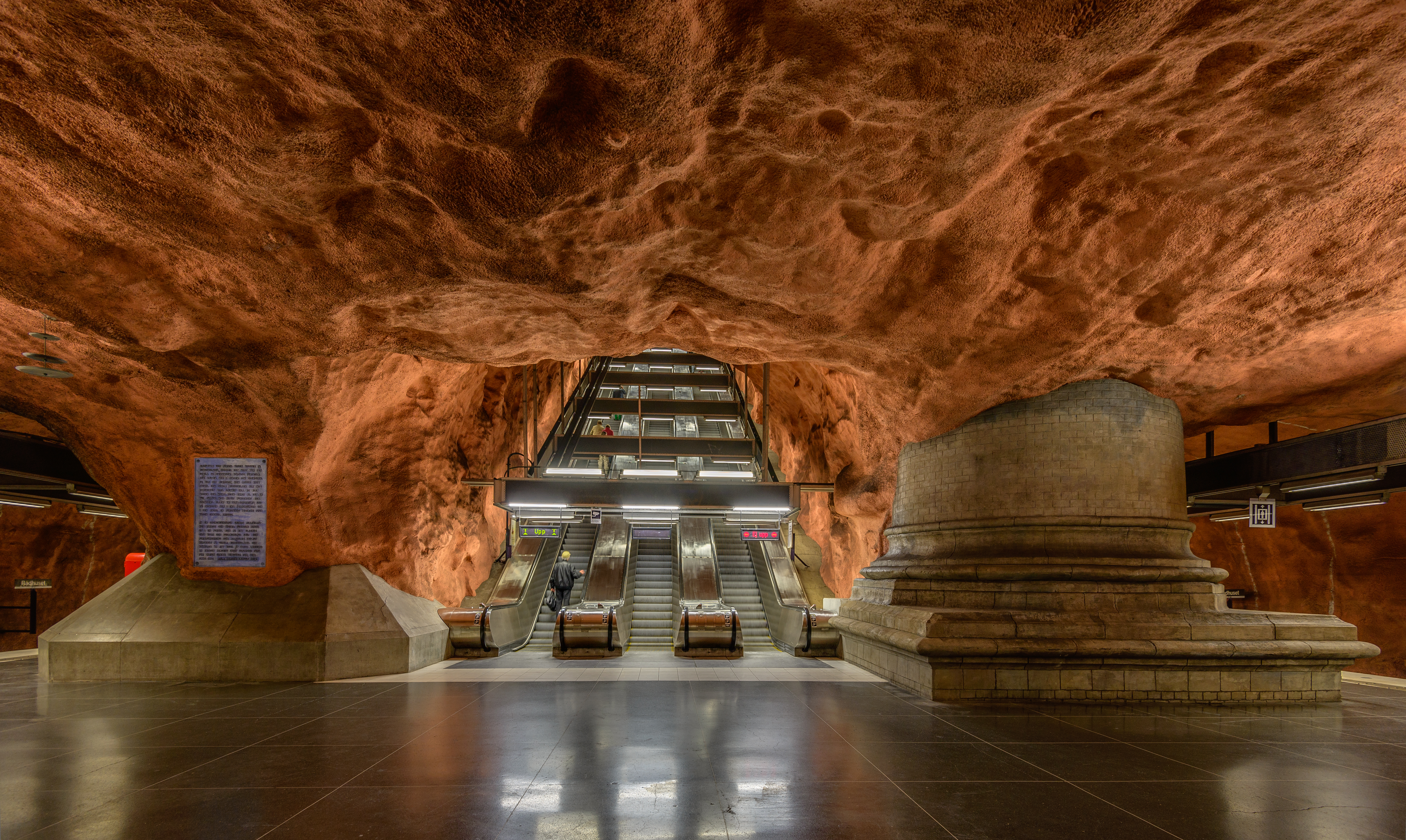
Exposed bedrock at the Rådhuset metro station

=== Rudolf Steiner ===
Rudolf Steiner, an esoteric philosopher, social reformer and architect, is also a significant player in organic architecture history. He is best known today for the Steiner concept of education or Waldorf schools, as well as being the father of the biodynamic approach to agriculture, but he also created a number of structures in the early 1900s and introduced his ideas about transformation into architecture. The original Goetheanum he constructed was an early example of organic architecture; but, due to fire, it was redesigned and replaced by the second, concrete and organically formed Goetheanum building, a cultural and spiritual center for the artists.

Other modernist architects in the U.S., Europe, and elsewhere held complementarily and often competing views of how architecture could best emulate nature. Key figures in the U.S. included Louis Sullivan, Claude Bragdon, Eugene Tsui and Paul Laffoley while among European modernists Hugo Häring, Arthur Dyson, Hans Scharoun, and Rudolf Steiner stand out. Following World War II, organic architecture often reflected cybernetic and informatics models of life, as is reflected in the later work of futurist architect Buckminster Fuller.

In his book The Breaking Wave: New Organic Architecture, Architect and planner- David Pearson created the Gaia Charter, a set of rules for organic architecture. Pearson draws inspiration from various movements, including Celtic design, Art Nouveau, Arts and Crafts, and Antoni Gaudí's work.

"Let the design:

- be inspired by nature and be sustainable, healthy, conserving, and diverse.
- unfold, like an organism, from the seed within.
- exist in the "continuous present" and "begin again and again".
- follow the flows and be flexible and adaptable.
- satisfy social, physical, and spiritual needs.
- "grow out of the site" and be unique.
- celebrate the spirit of youth, play, and surprise.
- express the rhythm of music and the power of dance."

There are contemporary creations of organic architecture. The definition of 'organic' has dramatically changed during recent times. Avoiding materials of construction that require more embodied energy to build and sustain it, when the building blends naturally and sits seamlessly to its surroundings, reflecting cultural continuity, it is 'organic' and is idealistic. Examples include leaving natural material, such as bedrock, exposed and unsculptured, such as the underground Rådhuset metro station in Stockholm, which appears to occupy a natural cave system.

== Principles of organic architecture ==
Building and site: The site is earth but raw; it has its own form and structure (flat or contour); trees and other plantations are part of the landform. The nature of the land influences the form of the building to some extent or completely. Buildings, like plants, emerge naturally from the landscape.

Material: The material or skin of a building that attractively displays its texture, color, and strength. Organic architecture uses minimal materials.

Shelter: The structure should give a sense of shelter and safety, and it should never be left unprotected or without privacy.

Space: Space is the core of structure; it may be seen when walls, floors, and roofs are packed together, but it is invisible when it is free. He states: "The reality of the building does not consist of the roof and the walls but the space within to be lived in" . An Area can only be completely appreciated when viewed from one point to another as you move from one space to another.

Proportion and scale: Nature has its own proportions and scales, and changing them would result in ludicrous or illogical shapes. According to Wright, "Integral harmony of proportion to the human figure to have all details so designed as to make the human relationship to architecture not only convenient but charming" .

Nature: Nature has influenced various fields, including architecture, art, engineering, and medicine. Nature taught us how to build and occupy space. Organic design requires that buildings mirror nature, be a part of nature, and not look out of place.

Repose: Creating an appropriate setting for human life. Uncluttered areas and the use of non-natural materials that have a harmful influence on the environment are not accepted in organic architecture.

== Examples of organic architecture ==
- Taliesin West (1937): This Arizona home was Wright's winter residence. The walls are covered in desert rocks, and the colors throughout the house—greys, tawny yellows, and reds—reflect the colors of the surrounding natural world. The property also has a pavilion with a translucent roof that welcomes sunshine and highlights the open Arizona sky.
- Rabbi Dr. I. Goldstein Synagogue (1957): Designed by Heinz Rau and David Resnick, this synagogue is located on the campus of Hebrew University in Jerusalem, Israel. Its exposed concrete dome-like construction is just 3.73 metres (12 ft 3 in) high and holds 150 people. The building was awarded the 1964 Rechter Prize.
- Rådhuset metro station (1975): Designed by Sigvard Olsson, Rådhuset station in central Stockholm has uncovered and unsculpted bedrock, highlighting the cave-like elements of this metro stop.
- Tampere Central Library (1986): The main municipal library in Tampere, Finland, was built by architects Reima and Raili Pietilä. This example of organic building makes use of the Finnish rock Rapakivi granite and includes animal shapes and glacial patterns.
- Cloud Art Museum (2020): This museum takes its cues from the meandering river and undulating hills on its site. Curving and transparent glass walls support a cloud-shaped roof that seemingly floats above the picturesque setting of the Qingshen Wetland Park. While flowing architectural lines allow the buildings to better integrate with their environment, clouds are also an auspicious symbol in traditional Chinese culture
- The Mushroom - a wood house in the forest (2020): Located in a misty pine forest, the architects used a commission for a modest hotel to experiment with novel natural-architecture interactions. The end result was two simple volumes in the shape of a mushroom stem and cap.
- The House of Three Trees (2018)
- Breakwater (2019)
- Grotto House (2023) This home merges with an enormous bedrock outcrop. A heavy stone wall made from slabs shorn from the outcrop itself roots the flowing wood and glass structure into the landscape and supports a living roof with a diverse array of sedums, grasses, and flowers native to the area.

== See also ==
- Biomorphism
- Metaphoric architecture
- Zoomorphic architecture
