= Durban Jewish Club =

- Founded: 1931; 95 years ago
- Location: 44 KE Masinga Rd, North Beach, Durban, 4056, South Africa
- Coordinates: 29°50′57.31393″S 31°2′2.80446″E

Durban Jewish Club, also known as Durban Jewish Centre, is an arts, culture and entertainment venue, an educational facility and a social and community hub in Durban, KwaZulu-Natal in South Africa. It was first established in 1931, and for a time it was the only country club in Durban that admitted Jews. It is also home to a number of Jewish organisations such as Beit David (formerly Temple David), a Reform synagogue. It is also the site of the Durban Holocaust and Genocide Centre, which has sister centres in Johannesburg and Cape Town, Cape Town Holocaust Centre and Johannesburg Holocaust and Genocide Centre.

== History ==
Talks to establish the club began in earnest in 1919. The club was subsequently built and opened on 4 May 1931 partly in response to antisemitism in South Africa. Jewish benefactors supported the project as Jews were mostly barred at the time from the Durban Country Club and similar clubs. When Aaron Klug, winner of the Nobel Prize in Chemistry, was growing up in Durban, his father, Lazar, regularly played chess at the club.

During the Second World War, Allied servicemen were invited to make use of its facilities such as its canteen, shower rooms, billiards, tennis, writing and reading rooms. An estimated two million soldiers and sailors of diverse nationalities and faiths are reported to have visited the club.

In the 1950s, Israel Goldstein, the American-born Israeli rabbi, author and Zionist leader addressed several Jewish groups at the club. Goldstein wrote about his visit in his memoirs: "The Durban Jewish Club, located near the seafront, was a large and impressive center of activity." Tony Leon, former leader of the opposition has been a guest speaker at the club on a number of occasions since 1990.

The Goldene Medina celebrates "175 Years of Jewish Life in South Africa" was a special exhibition staged at the club in 2017. Part of the exhibition also includes the club itself and its historical role in bringing together Durban Jewry.

=== Holocaust centre ===
In March 2008, the Durban Holocaust and Genocide Centre opened at the club. It expanded in size three years later and stayed on the campus of the club, occupying a remodeled part of the building to the rear. The centre is also home to The Circle Café, Durban's only kosher-kitchen restaurant.

=== Reform synagogue ===
The Durban Progressive Jewish Congregation (DPJC), also known as Beit David (formerly Temple David) is a Reform congregation that was established in 1948. It was based at its purpose-built synagogue in Morningside since 1950, before relocating to the club in 2018, where it had created a new sanctuary.

Talks for the congregation began in November 1947, with Rabbi Moses Cyrus Weiler addressing a meeting at the home of Mervyn Gild. In May 1948, Weiler visited again to address a larger inaugural meeting at the Jewish club, where Gild was elected president of the new congregation. In December 1949, a plot was purchased on Ridge Road in Morningside. The foundation stone was laid in August 1950 and for the next twenty years the congregation was served by rabbi Meyer Miller, who was from Brooklyn in New York City and a graduate of the Jewish Institute of Religion. Miller was succeeded by Temple David's long-term rabbi, Isaac Richards. Richards was originally from Liverpool in England and raised under Orthodox Judaism. He served with the British Army during World War II and was one of the liberators of Bergen-Belsen concentration camp.

The professional surfer, Shaun Tomson, was raised in Temple David with his family and had his Bar Mitzvah there. Following the death of his son in 2006, Tomson returned to his familial shul and reconnected with his faith.

== See also ==
- Durban United Hebrew Congregation
- Umhlanga Jewish Centre
