= Durban United Hebrew Congregation =

Modern Orthodox synagogue in Durban, South Africa

Religion
- Affiliation: Modern Orthodox Judaism
- Rite: Nusach Ashkenaz
- Ecclesiastical or organizational status: Synagogue
- Ownership: Durban United Hebrew Congregation
- Leadership: Rabbi Pinchas Zekry
- Status: Active

Location
- Location: 36 Silverton Road, Berea, Durban, South Africa
- Country: South Africa
- Interactive map of Durban United Hebrew Congregation
- Coordinates: 29°50′56″S 30°59′50″E

Architecture
- Architects: Edgar Alfred Henry The New Synagogue; Samuel Norton Tomkin The Great Synagogue
- Type: Synagogue architecture
- Established: 1841 (as a congregation)
- Completed: 1884 (First shul); 1904 (The New Synagogue); 1961 (The Great Synagogue); 2017 (Silverton Road Shul)

The Durban United Hebrew Congregation, also known as Silverton Road Shul, is a Modern Orthodox Jewish congregation and synagogue, located in Berea. The congregation was established in 1883 and its synagogues have since been the main places of worship for Durban Jewry.

The congregation has occupied four buildings, most notably the purpose-built New Synagogue from 1904 to 1961 and the Great Synagogue from 1961 to 2017. The latter was one of the country's largest synagogue buildings.

== History ==
The congregation was formed in 1883, following a period where services were held in private homes. In 1884, Durban's first synagogue was established in a converted Methodist chapel. A third of the funds for the synagogue were raised by Daniel De Pass, a businessman from a Sephardi Jewish. De Pass was visiting from England as his family had established the sugar cane industry in Natal.

In 1904, a larger purpose-built synagogue was dedicated, known as the New Synagogue and located on Musgrave Road in Berea. The imposing synagogue had two domes and was designed by the Australian architect, Edgar Alfred Henry, who had emigrated to Natal from Sydney in 1900. The congregation was served by Rabbi Rabbi Ephraim Moses (Eric Montagu) Levy from 1924 to 1935, before he went on to serve at the Great Synagogue in Sydney. During this period there was a significant Talmud Torah, Hebrew kindergarten and Levy was responsible for bringing Hebrew language teaching into Durban High School. Levy was also president of the fraternal order, the Lodge of the Order of David. Meanwhile, his wife, Mrs Levy, was president of the Women's Zionist League.

The congregation relocated again in 1961, building a larger synagogue, the Great Synagogue at 75 Silverton Road in Berea. The building was designed by Samuel Norton Tomkin, a distinguished South African Jewish architect and long-time Durban resident. A landmark building in Durban, a scale model of the building was added to Mini Town in 1987, a tourist attraction consisting of Durban's most iconic buildings in miniature form.

In the 1970s, the city's Jewish population peaked with 7, 500 Jews, among South Africa's Jewry's peak population of 120, 000. In the 1970s the community was bolstered by the arrival of Jews from Rhodesia.

Rabbi Abner Weiss led the congregation from the Silverton Road Great Synagogue as Chief Rabbi of Natal from 1969 - 1976. He went on to occupy important pulpits in London as Chief Rabbi of Western Marble Arch Synagogue and the United States at the Beth Jacob Congregation in Beverly Hills, the Riverdale Jewish Centre in New York and Westwood Village Synagogue, Los Angeles.

Tony Leon, future leader of the opposition, grew up in Durban, and had his Bar Mitzvah at the Great Synagogue in the late 1960s, and also attended High Holiday services there. In 1988, the congregation and Durban Jewry were shaken by an antisemitic hate crime, when pigs heads marked with swastikas on their foreheads and Stars of David on each ear were placed on the exterior steps of the Great Synagogue, as well as at the Jewish Club in Durban. An Irish national was arrested for desecration and subsequently fled the country. The incident also prompted a response from then-State President PW Botha, issuing a strong warning to Neo-Nazis in the country, telling them that he was not prepared to tolerate their antics.

In 2017, the congregation relocated to a smaller building in Berea to reflect demographic changes, with the city's Jewish community numbering around 2, 000, down from a high of between 7, 000 to 7,500 in the seventies. Since the Soweto Uprising in 1976, South Africa's Jewish population has declined due to emigration. The top choice for Durban Jewish emigrants has been Israel, followed by the United States, Australia, the United Kingdom and Canada. There has also been internal migration to larger Jewish population centres in Johannesburg and Cape Town. Children in the congregation are served by the Jewish day school in uMhlanga. The Great Synagogue buildings are now occupied by Stadio (previously Embury), a tertiary education institute.

The congregation's long-time rabbi of over thirty years is Rabbi Pinchas Zekry. In 1998, Zekry published a thesis on Orthodox conversion to Judaism.

== See also ==
- Umhlanga Jewish Centre
- Durban Jewish Club
