= Rabbi Dr. I. Goldstein Synagogue =

Synagogue in Givat Ram, Jerusalem

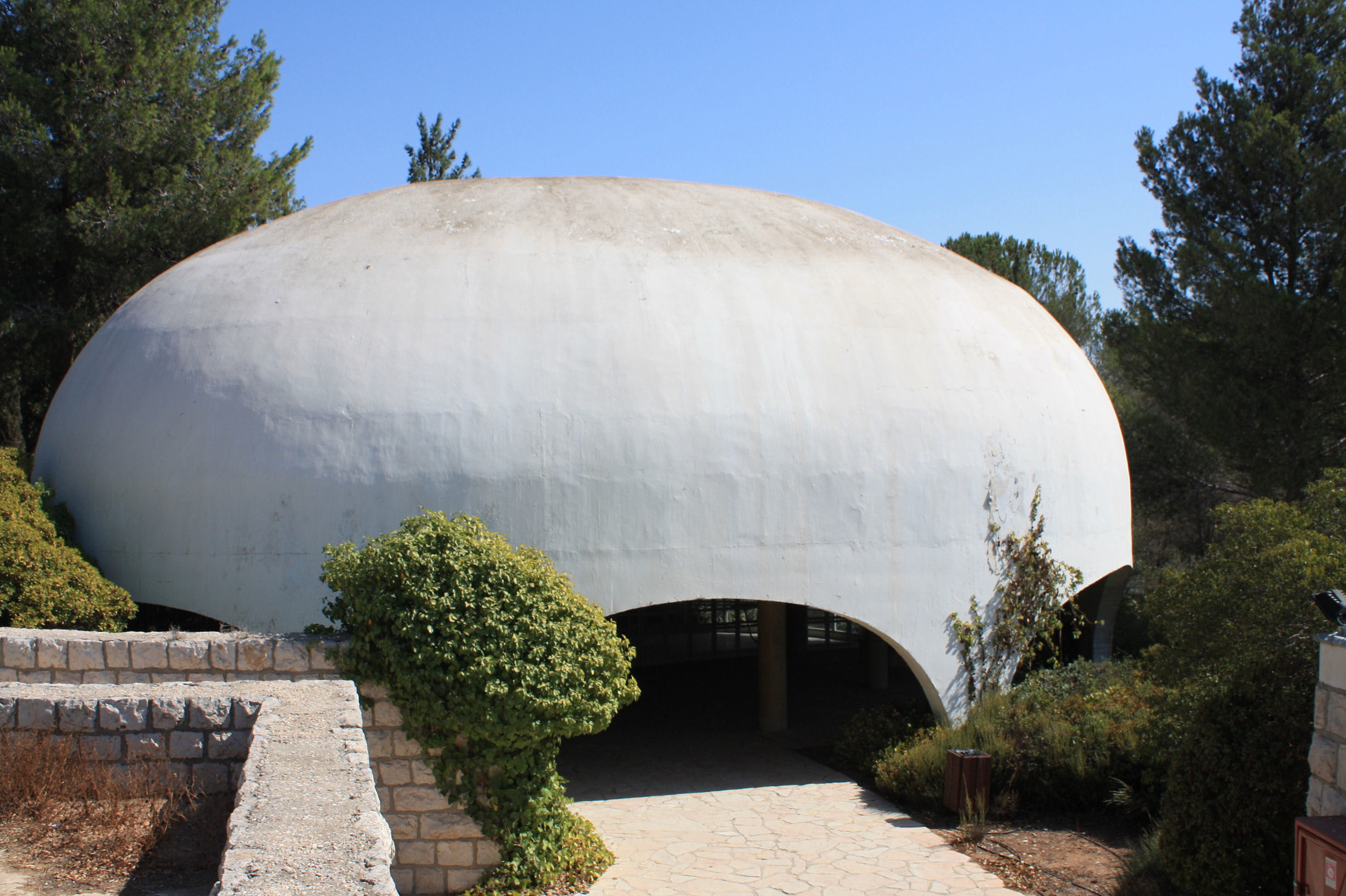
- The synagogue exterior, in 2009

- Location of the synagogue in Jerusalem

Religion
- Affiliation: Judaism
- Rite: Nusach varies
- Ecclesiastical or organizational status: University synagogue
- Ownership: Hebrew University
- Year consecrated: 1957
- Status: Active

Location
- Location: Edmond J. Safra (Givat Ram) Campus, Hebrew University, Jerusalem
- Country: Israel
- Interactive map of Rabbi Dr. I. Goldstein Synagogue
- Coordinates: 31°46′12″N 35°11′52″E

Architecture
- Architects: Heinz Rau; David Resnick
- Type: Synagogue architecture
- Style: Organic
- Completed: 1957

Specifications
- Capacity: 100 worshippers
- Height (max): 3.73 metres (12 ft 3 in)
- Materials: Exposed concrete

The Rabbi Dr. I. Goldstein Synagogue, also known as the Israel Goldstein Synagogue, is a Jewish congregation and synagogue, located on the Edmond J. Safra Givat Ram campus of the Hebrew University of Jerusalem. The synagogue was named in honor of Rabbi Israel Goldstein, an American-born Israeli rabbi, author, and Zionist leader.

Designed in the organic style by two Israeli architects, the German-born Heinrich Heinz Rau and the Brazilian-born David Resnick, the synagogue building was listed as one of the "ten most beautiful synagogues in Israel," and called "without a doubt, a landmark in local architecture." In 1964, the synagogue design was awarded the Rechter Prize by the Israeli Architects Association.

== History ==
The site of Israel's Hebrew University was Mount Scopus, an area that was captured by Jordan during the 1947–1949 Palestine war. Givat Ram, the site of the new campus, was largely undeveloped in 1957 when the synagogue was built. The site was described as "a largely bare, rocky plateau and each building sat on it almost as if in a desert." The synagogue is located on Elyashar Street (Derekh Elyashar).

Much of the funding for the synagogue came from friends of Rabbi Goldstein, in honor of his 60th anniversary. At the April 1958 ceremony formally dedicating the new Givat Ram campus and opening 21 new campus buildings, Dr. George S. Wise, chairman of the university's International Board of Governors, noted that the synagogue was one of ten buildings constructed with the help of donations from both organizations and individual donors in the U.S.

=== Consecration ===
The synagogue was consecrated on August 7, 1957. Among the guests at the ceremony was Yitzhak Ben-Zvi, the President of Israel. Remarks by Ben-Zvi and other Israeli officials praised Goldstein as a man of spirit and action, who had dedicated his life to the Jewish people. As part of the ceremony, Joseph Klausner, professor emeritus at Hebrew University, opened the Torah ark.

== Design ==
The synagogue is 3.73 m (12.25 ft) high, with an exterior in the shape of a "concrete hemisphere" on eight arches. The floor of the synagogue is a raised platform, and the interior has no windows, "yet in a sense is adorned by light, which ripples up from below on all sides." Within the domed worship space there is room for 100 worshippers. Separate sections for male and female worshipers are located on the same level, separated by a wooden screen.

The exterior design has been described as one that "takes the form of a gentle concrete puffball hovering just above the surface of the rock, rather as if it had been tossed there by the wind," with the suggestion that "the spiritual world (of the dome) passing silently around the temporal one (of the floor) without ever quite meeting it." A description linked to a 2005 retrospective of architect David Resnick noted that "It gives the impression of hovering in the air and being rooted in the ground at the same time - a totally modernistic building that exploits new technologies, but evokes local historical associations. While very different from the buildings around it, it blends in amazingly well."

One article on "25 beautiful synagogues worldwide" describes the synagogue as mushroom-shaped, and yet at the same time "other-worldly." "It is meant to look organic, natural, and imperfect, as though it just settled there one day." Resnick described Jerusalem as "a melancholy place", with the "fragility of the puff-ball synagogue" expressing that vision.

=== Postage stamp ===
In 1975 the synagogue was featured in a series of Israeli postage stamps dedicated to "Architecture in Israel."

== Worship ==
Campus religious programs are coordinated by Hillel (the organization for "Jewish Campus Life") which has offices on the Mount Scopus campus. Many services are held in the Hecht Synagogue on that campus, but because the location of the Goldstein synagogue is remote from the Givat Ram campus center for work and study no worship services are held on a regular basis. However, there is a synagogue with regular prayer services and Torah study on the Givat Ram campus located in the old building of the National Library.

=== Special ceremonies and events ===
In 1961 a special ceremony was held at the synagogue to accept a Torah scroll contributed by a group of tourists from the United States. An Israeli representative from the Ministry of Religious Affairs (now renamed Ministry of Religious Services) participated in the ceremony, noting that this was one of 1500 Torah scrolls that have so far been collected from other nations (including many scrolls from communities destroyed during the Holocaust), but some 400 communities still needed Torah scrolls.

== See also ==
- Architecture of Israel
- History of the Jews in Israel
- List of synagogues in Israel
- Synagogue architecture
