= Samuel Norton Tomkin =

South African architect (1908–2013)

- Born: 27 August 1908; London, England
- Died: 31 January 2013 (aged 104); Toronto, Ontario, Canada
- Citizenship: South Africa; Canada
- Education: University of the Witwatersrand
- Spouse: Rita Barnard
- Children: 2
- Awards: Gold Medal of Honour (1965)

Samuel "Sonny" Norton Tomkin (27 August 1908 – 31 January 2013) was a British-born South African architect. As a partner of the firm Hanson, Tomkin & Finkelstein, with Norman Leonard Hanson and Nathan Finkelstein, they were one of the most significant pre- and post-war groups of architects operating in South Africa. In the Transvaal and Natal, Tomkin designed university buildings, hospitals, government buildings and synagogues, including the Great Synagogue in Durban. In 1965, he was awarded the Gold Medal of Honour from the Institute of South African Architects.

== Early life ==
Tomkin was born in London in 1908 to Jewish immigrant parents that fled pogroms in Minsk in the Russian Empire. In 1914, his father set out to South Africa to purchase cattle to export to England. Amid World War I and a bombing campaign in London, he and his mother sought shelter in the coastal resort town of Worthing. In 1919, he, his mother and his two siblings immigrated to South Africa, joining his father. The family settled in Pretoria, where his father had established a successful business.

He initially faced antisemitism in government schools in Pretoria, facing physical violence from classmates. At the time he was also barred from attending a boarding school as they did not admit Jewish students. However, at the age of 13 he was successfully admitted to a Catholic boarding school.

He studied at the University of the Witwatersrand in Johannesburg, where he met Nathan Finkelstein, an architectural student, and decided to enrol in an architecture degree.

== Career ==
After graduating from his five-year architecture program, Tomkin started a practice in Johannesburg with Finkelstein and Norman (Leonard) Hanson. In 1934, the new firm completed Hotpoint House at 235 Bree Street in central Johannesburg. It was one of the first of its kind as it had no classical precedent, and with its clean lines and proportions, demonstrated New Architecture. Finkelstein left the firm in 1950, with architect Herbert Prins becoming a name partner in the firm in 1960.

In 1951, his design for Amsterdam House on Durban's West Street in the central shopping area, was profiled in the South African Architectural Record. In 1956, together with Hanson, he designed the government offices on Durban's esplanade. The work of the firm belonged to "New Empiricism", this approach learned from the past to allow knowledge and information to inform the aesthetic choices of new buildings.

In the early 1960s he designed Durban's Great Synagogue on Essendon Road in Berea. The building was consecrated in 1961 and was one of the country's largest synagogue buildings. A landmark building in Durban, a scale model of the building was added to Mini Town in 1987, a tourist attraction consisting of Durban's most iconic buildings in miniature form.

In 1963, together with Hanson, he designed the Electrical Engineering Building at the University of Natal in Durban.

In 1965, he was awarded the Gold Medal of Honour from the Institute of South African Architects. The following year he was the recipient of civic honours from the City of Durban for nearly 40 years of contributions to its town and regional planning developments. In 1970, he was elected an Honorary Fellow of the University of Natal for outstanding services to education and training in the fields of architecture, quantity surveying, building science and town and regional planning in South Africa, particularly in Natal.

From 1970 to 1978, his firm was known as SN Tomkin, Hanson & Harris in Durban.

== Personal life ==
Tomkin married Rita Barnard, with whom he had two children, Neil and Janet. Neil was shot and wounded in a random shooting at the age of 21, and his girlfriend killed.

Janet, a clinical psychologist and her husband, Dr Jonathan Hellmann, a pediatric/neonatal doctor emigrated to Canada in 1982. Tomkin and his wife joined the couple in 1992, settling permanently in Toronto. Rita died in 1998 and Janet died in July 2009. Neil died in December 2014.

Tomkin died on 31 January 2013 in Toronto, at the age of 104. He is buried in the Adath Israel section of Pardes Shalom Cemetery in Vaughan.
