= Dov Feigin =

Israeli sculptor

Dov Feigin דב פייגין
- Dov Feigin in a pottery class (Ein Hod, 1956)
- Born: 1907; Lugansk, Slavyanoserbsk uezd, Yekaterinoslav Governorate, Russian Empire
- Died: 2000 (aged 92–93)
- Known for: Sculpture
- Notable work: Animal, 1958
- Movement: Ofakim Hadasim ("New Horizons")

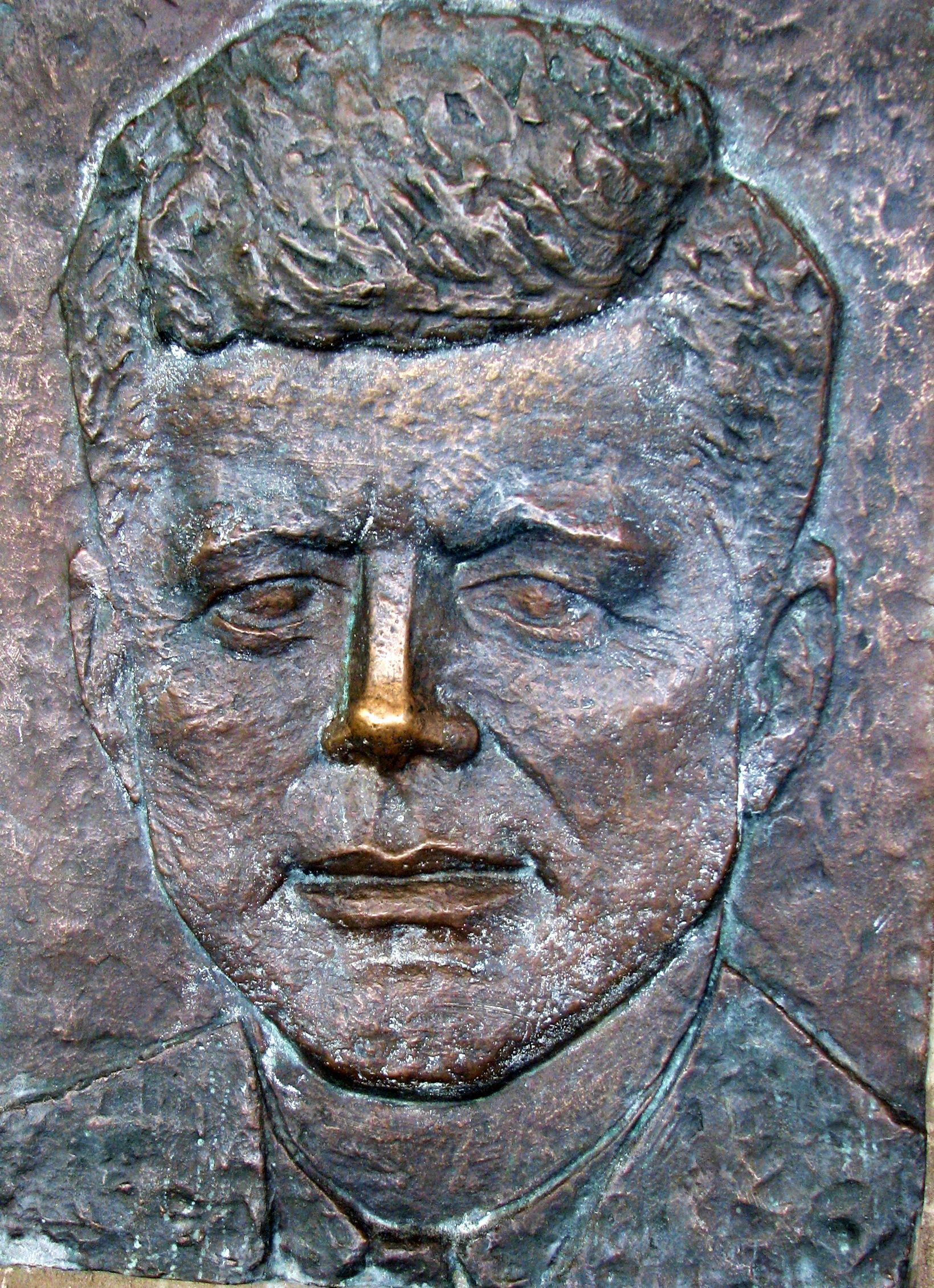
Bronz relief in Yad Kennedy

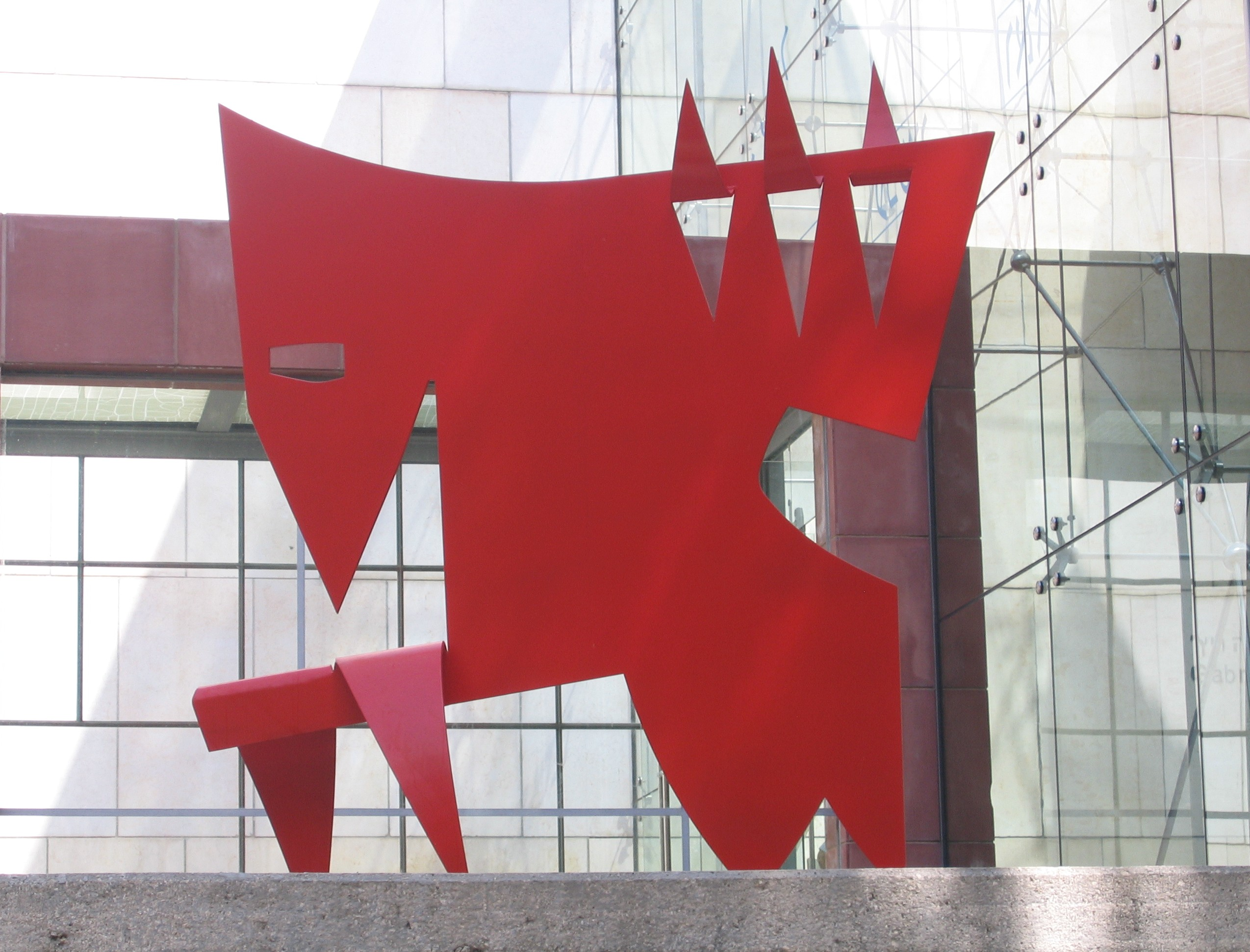
Animal (1958/2006), Tel Aviv Museum of Art, Israel

Dov Feigin (Hebrew: דב פייגין; 1907-2000) was an Israeli sculptor.

== Biography ==
Dov Feigin was born in 1907 in Luhansk, Ukraine, then part of the Russian Empire. His father was a tailor. Feigin attended public Ukraine school as well as a Talmud Torah school. In 1920, Feigin's family moved to Gomel, where he became a member of the Socialist-Zionist movement Hashomer Hatzair. In 1924, he was arrested and imprisoned for three years. In 1927, after his release, he emigrated to the Mandate Palestine and joined the Hashomer Hatzair group. He was also one of the founding members of the Afikim Kibbutz.

In 1933, Feigin was accepted to the École nationale supérieure des arts décoratifs in Paris, France, where he studied as a traditional sculptor. His works from that period were mostly traditional statues in stone. In 1937, Feigin returned to Tel Aviv.

In 1948, he joined an artistic group called “Ofakim Hadasim” (Hebrew for - “New Horizons”) founded earlier that year by Joseph Zaritsky. The group was heavily inspired by the European Modern Art Movement.

== Art career ==
In 1956, influenced by this group, Feigins work transformed to be more abstract. He began to use metal (iron) in constructing his sculptures. Like many of the “New Horizons” artists (like Yitzhak Danziger), his works were influenced by the Israeli Canaanites movement. Works like 1956’s "Bird" and “Alomot” (he: אלומות - "stalk of wheat") or 1957’s “Ladders” present a linear abstract structure.

In 1948 and 1962, he attended the Venice Biennale.

In 1966, he designed a relief inside Yad Kennedy, a memorial to John F. Kennedy in Jerusalem.

One of his most famous sculptures, Animal, (1958, restored in 2006) is now in the Lola Beer Ebner Sculpture Garden of the Tel Aviv Museum of Art in Tel Aviv, Israel.

== Awards ==
- In 1946, Feigin was a co-recipient of the Dizengoff Prize for Sculpture.
- Sandberg Prize recipient

== See also ==
- Visual arts in Israel
