= Yad Kennedy =

Memorial in Mateh Yehuda Region, Israel

John F. Kennedy Memorial
- Yad Kennedy
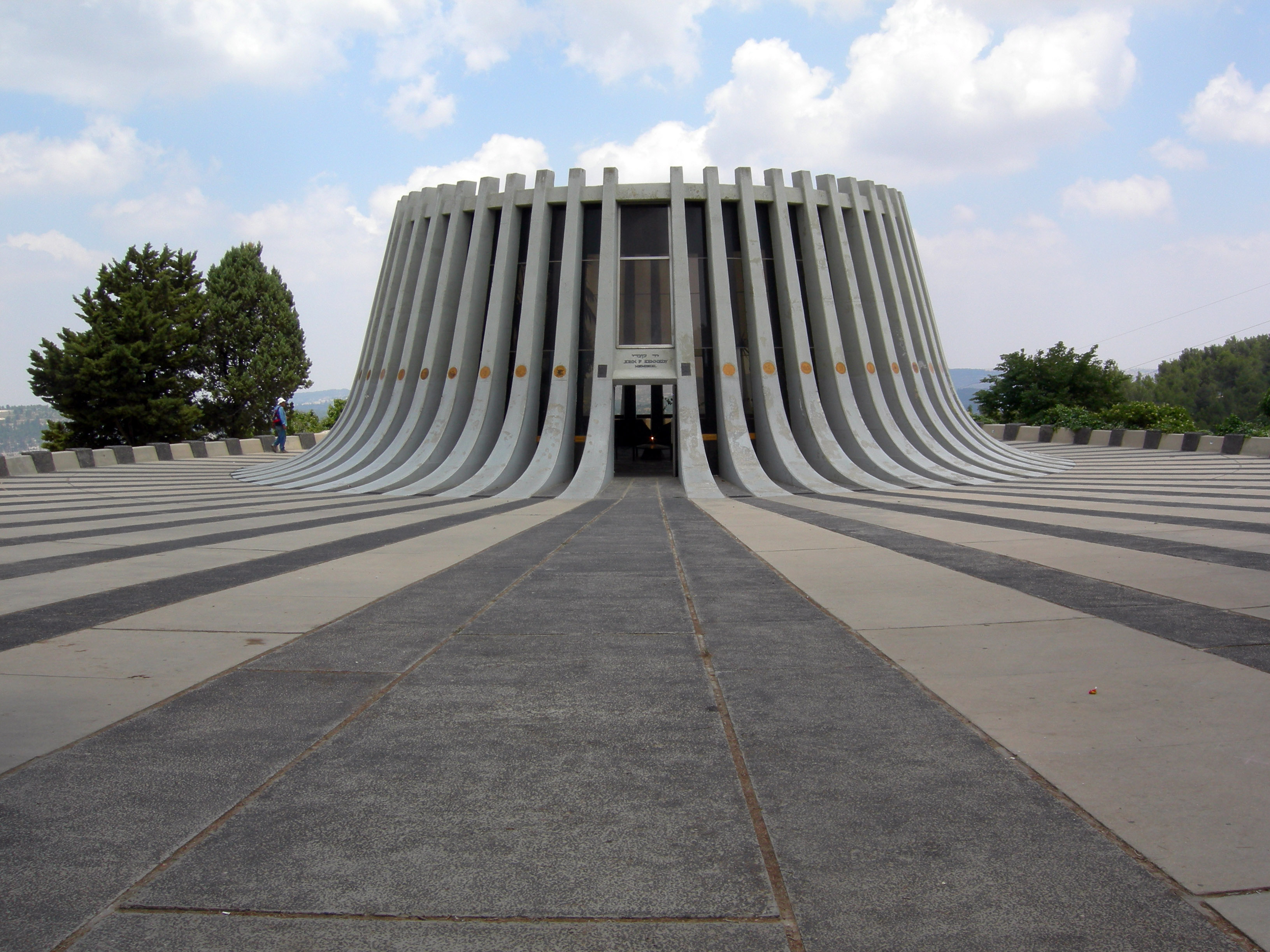
- Yad Kennedy (John F. Kennedy Memorial)
- Interactive map of John F. Kennedy Memorial
- Location: Mateh Yehuda Region near Jerusalem
- Coordinates: 31°44′56.69″N 35°8′4.98″E
- Designer: Architect David Resnick with sculptor Dov Feigin
- Material: Concrete and glass
- Height: 60 ft (18 m)
- Beginning date: 1965
- Completion date: 1966
- Opening date: 4 July 1966
- Dedicated to: John F. Kennedy
- Internal area includes bust of Kennedy, eternal light, memorial wall inscribed with excerpts of Kennedy's speeches, and library of photographs and documents related to US-Israel relations until time of Kennedy's death

Yad Kennedy (Hebrew: יד קנדי, lit. 'Kennedy memorial'), located in the Mateh Yehuda Region near Jerusalem, is a memorial to John F. Kennedy, the 35th President of the United States, who was assassinated in Dallas, Texas, in 1963. The 60-foot-high (18 m) memorial is shaped like the stump of a felled tree, symbolizing a life cut short. Inside is a bronze relief of Kennedy, with an eternal flame burning in the center. It is encircled by 51 concrete columns, one for each of the 50 states in the United States plus one for Washington, D.C., the United States capital. The emblems of the states (and of the District of Columbia) are displayed on each of the columns, and the columns are separated by slim panels of glass. The monument measures approximately 250 feet (76 m) in circumference around its base, and there is space within the memorial for approximately 100 visitors at a time. The monument was built in 1966 with funds donated by American Jewish communities.

Yad Kennedy and its adjoining picnic grounds are part of the John F. Kennedy Peace Forest.

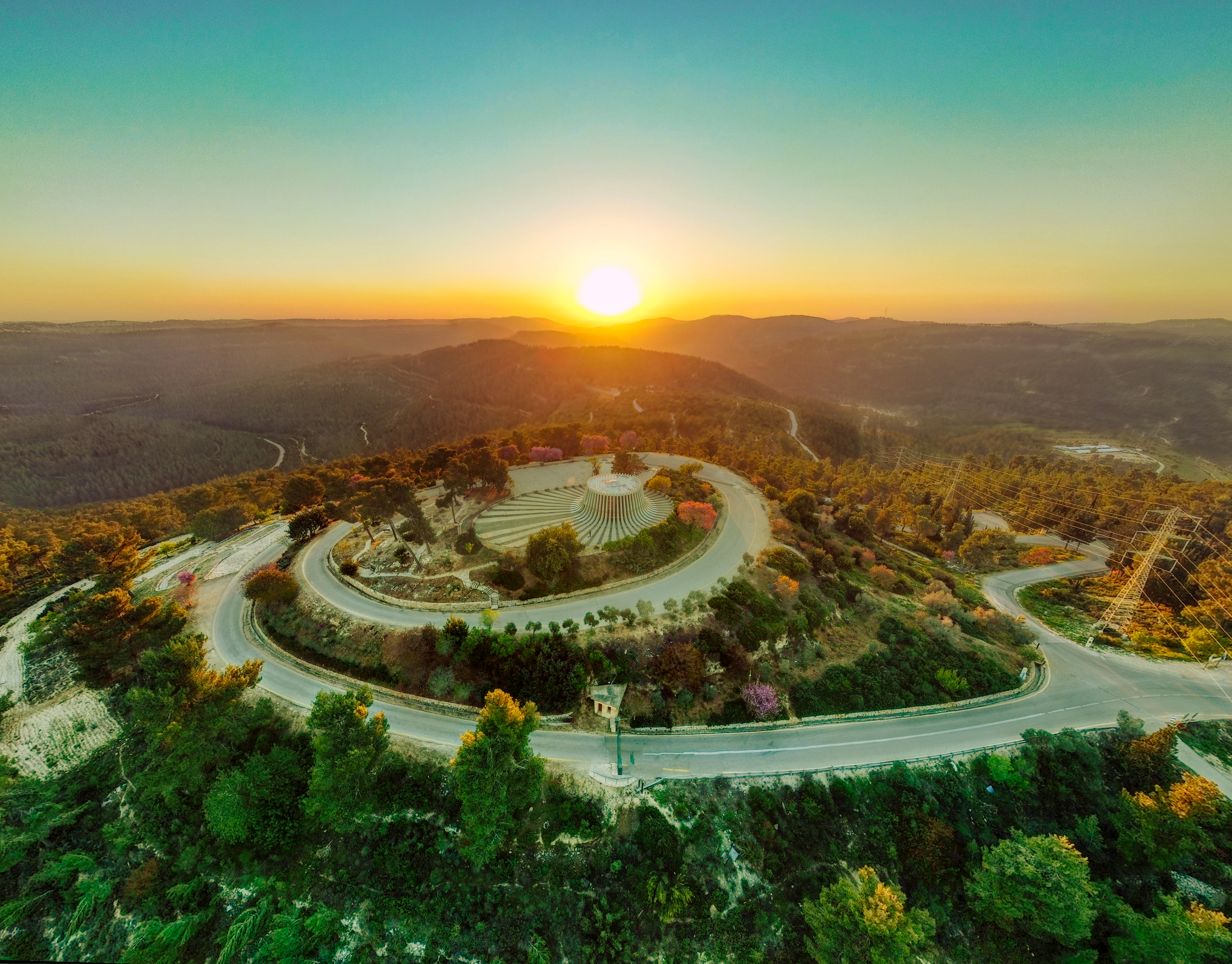
Yad Kennedy at sunset

== Name ==
The Hebrew word yad, which is used for a number of memorials in Israel (including the well-known Holocaust memorial museum Yad Vashem), comes from the Book of Isaiah, chapter 56, verse 5: "And to them will I give in my house and within my walls a memorial and a name (yad vashem)."

== Location ==
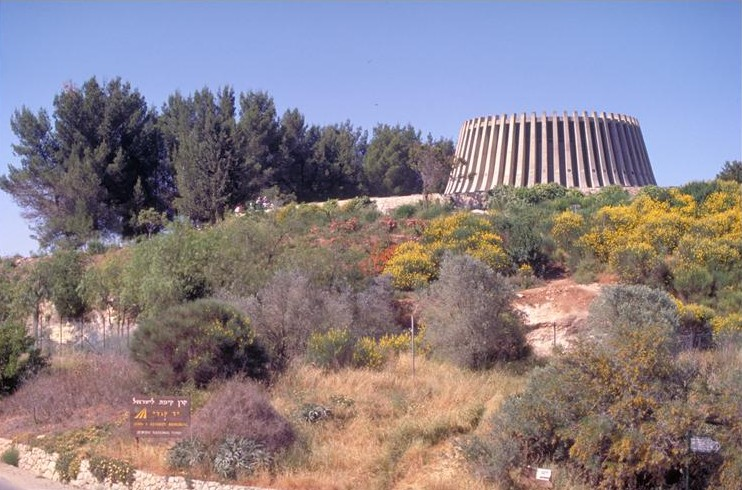
View of Yad Kennedy on hilltop

The site is located 7 miles (11 km) from downtown Jerusalem, in the same general direction as Hadassah Medical Center, on top of the highest of the Jerusalem hills, at an elevation of 825 metres (2,707 ft). The site overlooks what was at the time of the dedication the Jordanian village of Bittar (now a part of Israel's West Bank), the historic site of Betar, famous as the last stronghold of the Jewish revolt led by Simon Bar Kochba against Roman forces in 132–135 CE. The view from the parking lot has been described in the Frommer's travel guide as "breathtaking – a never-ending succession of mountains and valleys." On a clear day, the Mediterranean Sea can be seen in the direction of Tel Aviv, 40 miles (64 km) away. The memorial can be reached by following the winding mountain roads past Ora and Aminadav. It is approximately 45 minutes by foot from the nearest main road, where the closest Jerusalem city bus is #20, although special tour buses are normally utilized for group visits.

The monument and adjoining picnic grounds are part of the John F. Kennedy Peace Forest. The area designated as the JFK Peace Forest is part of the larger "Aminadav Forest", a 7,000-dunam forest in Ein Kerem.

== History ==
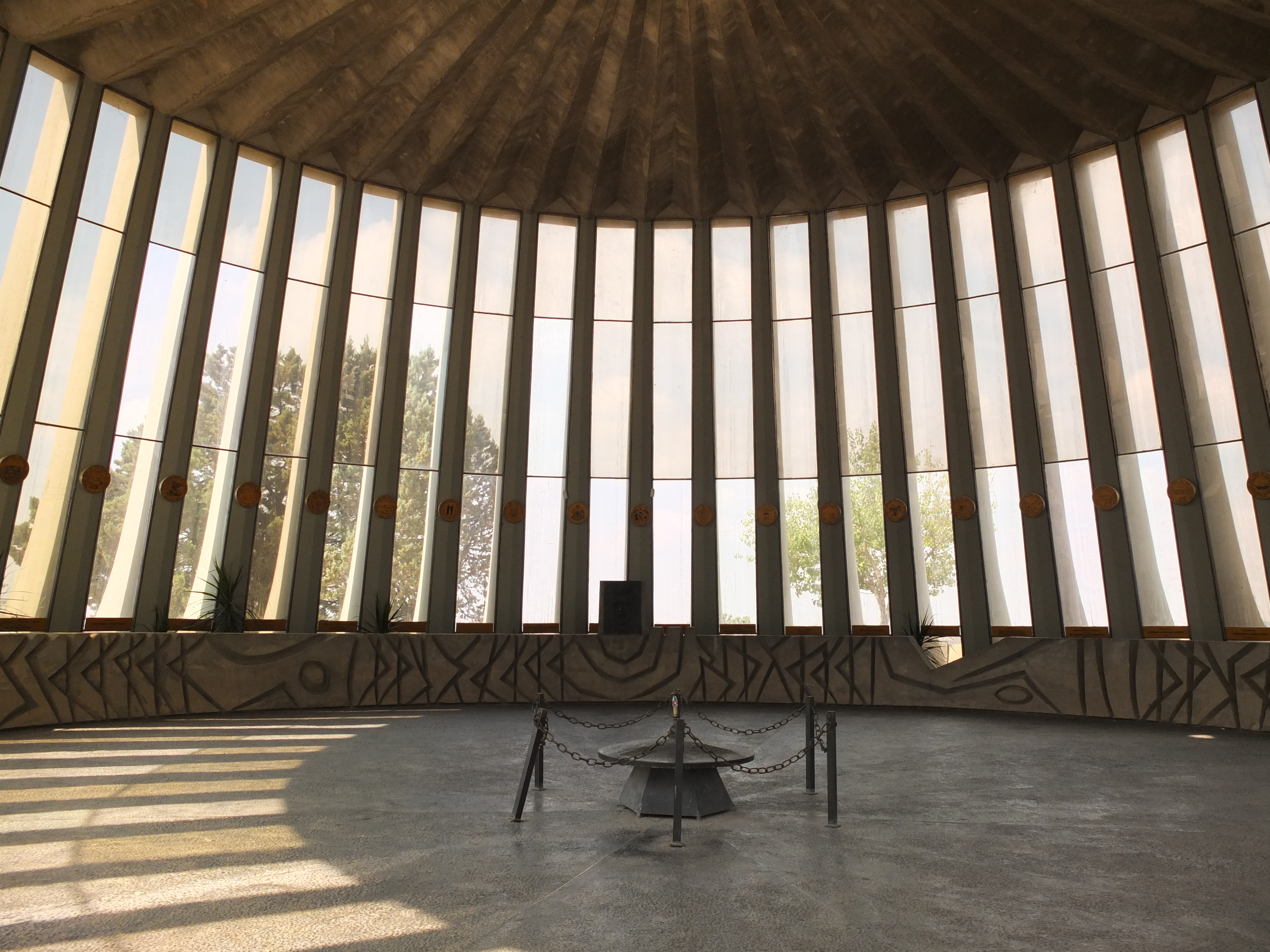
Interior with eternal flame and columns decorated with state seals

Max Bressler of Chicago, Illinois, then president of the American Jewish National Fund, came up with the proposal for the memorial in 1964. Bressler, for whom the Jerusalem neighborhood of Kiryat Menachem is named, had hoped to lead an American delegation to the dedication ceremony, but he died in 1966.

=== Fundraising ===
On 13 January 1964, former Pennsylvania Governor George M. Leader announced plans for the memorial, stating that he would serve as the General Chair of a State committee to raise funds. He stated that similar committees would be set up in each State, as well as some additional committees in countries overseas. On 22 November 1964, the first anniversary of the assassination, the Jewish National Fund sponsored meetings in major Jewish communities throughout the United States. The meetings were described as tributes for the fallen President as well as symbolic dedication ceremonies for the planned memorial.

American communities pledged to fund the planting of trees in the forest in addition to funds for the memorial. For example, in July 1965, the community of Los Angeles, California pledged to have 100,000 trees planted as a result of a banquet sponsored by JNF attended by more than 1000 government, union, and management leaders.

=== Dedication ===
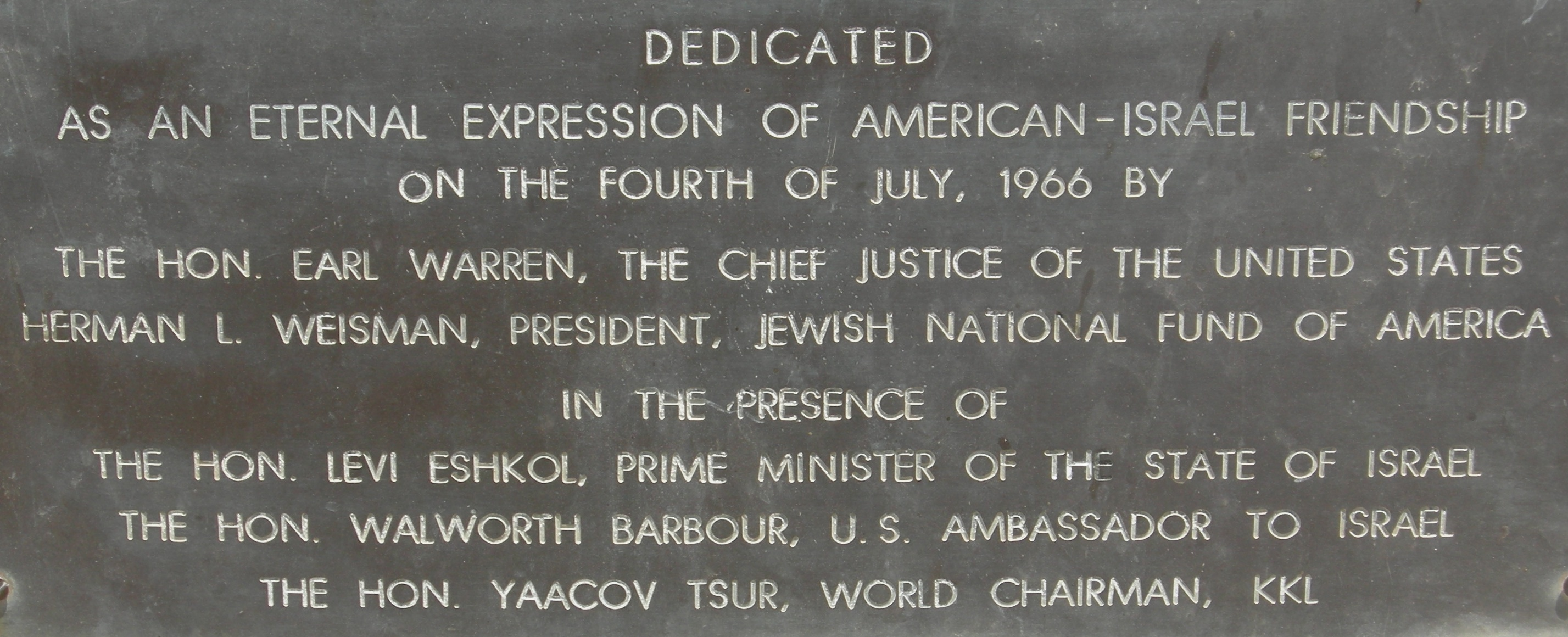
Dedication plaque at Yad Kennedy, Jerusalem

Nearly 2000 people, including many official guests representing the Israeli and United States governments, came to witness the dedication, along with hundreds of tourists, American students, and Israelis.

An Israeli children's band played Hatikva, the Israeli national anthem, along with the U.S. anthem, the Star Spangled Banner. The New York Times reported that the children "tried valiantly" to play the U.S. song, playing very slowly, but then many strong voices from among the crowd helped out until the music "swept the audience."

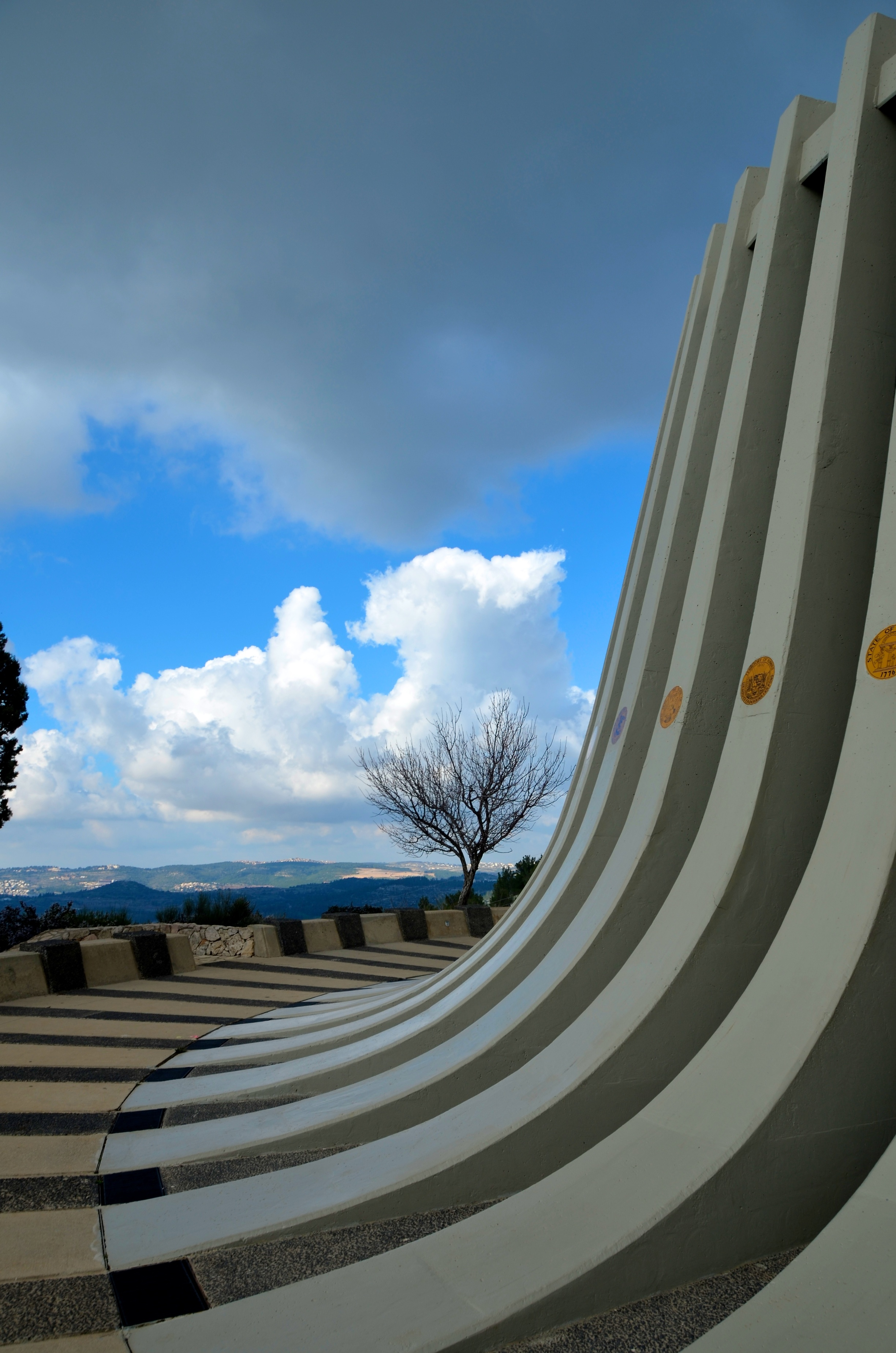
Close up of sloping columns

Among the guests at the 4 July 1966 dedication was U.S. Chief Justice Earl Warren, who had chaired the commission tasked with investigating the 1963 assassination. Among other guests were Levi Eshkol, Prime Minister of Israel, Teddy Kollek, the mayor of Jerusalem, and Walworth Barbour, the United States Ambassador to Israel.

Chief Justice Warren, who was reported to be so enthusiastic about the memorial after actually seeing it for the first time that he rewrote his remarks, noted:

We choose to do this on the American Independence Day but also in honor of the independence of Israel and other free nations. We are all confronted here by history because this is the birthplace of the world's three religions on which our own civilization is based and which contributed the all-important principle that all people are God's children and entitled to live in peace.

Warren noted that Washington, D.C. had many memorials, but that this area, with the forest as a "living memorial," would have "greatly pleased" Kennedy for two reasons. First, Kennedy himself had spoken of the importance of planting trees in Israel, when he had addressed a 1958 Jewish National Fund meeting while serving as a junior Senator from Massachusetts, saying, "What work could be more heartwarming or more enduring than the great forest at Jerusalem. Your children and grandchildren when they visit Israel will find your monument". Second, Warren recalled that Kennedy had visited Israel twice, the first time in 1939 when it was still part of the British Mandate, and the second time in 1951. Speaking in 1951 of the differences between the people he witnessed during those two visits, he said that "Perhaps the greatest change of all I found in the hearts and minds of the people, For unlike the discouraged settlers of 1939 they looked to the future with hope. I found a revival of an ancient spirit". Warren concluded his remarks by saying he would use the same word that President Kennedy would have used: "Shalom."

Israeli Prime Minister Eshkol spoke as well, noting that Kennedy's memory would be kept alive by this memorial "not only as a friend of Israel but also as a symbol of the lofty ideals of his country and of all humanity," dedicating the memorial to "the man who opened new frontiers of international relations and human friendships."

In remarks offered by the American ambassador to Israel, Walworth Barbour, he noted that "A nation reveals itself not only by the men it produces but also by the men it honors. In thus honoring and remembering the late President Kennedy, the men and women of the Jewish National Fund honor themselves--beyond and above the glory they have already earned in their work for Israel."

Jacob Tsur, world president of the Jewish National Fund, praised the memorial as well, "conceived in the shape of a mighty trunk of a fallen tree, among the thousands of saplings which will grow one day into a great forest."

== Design ==
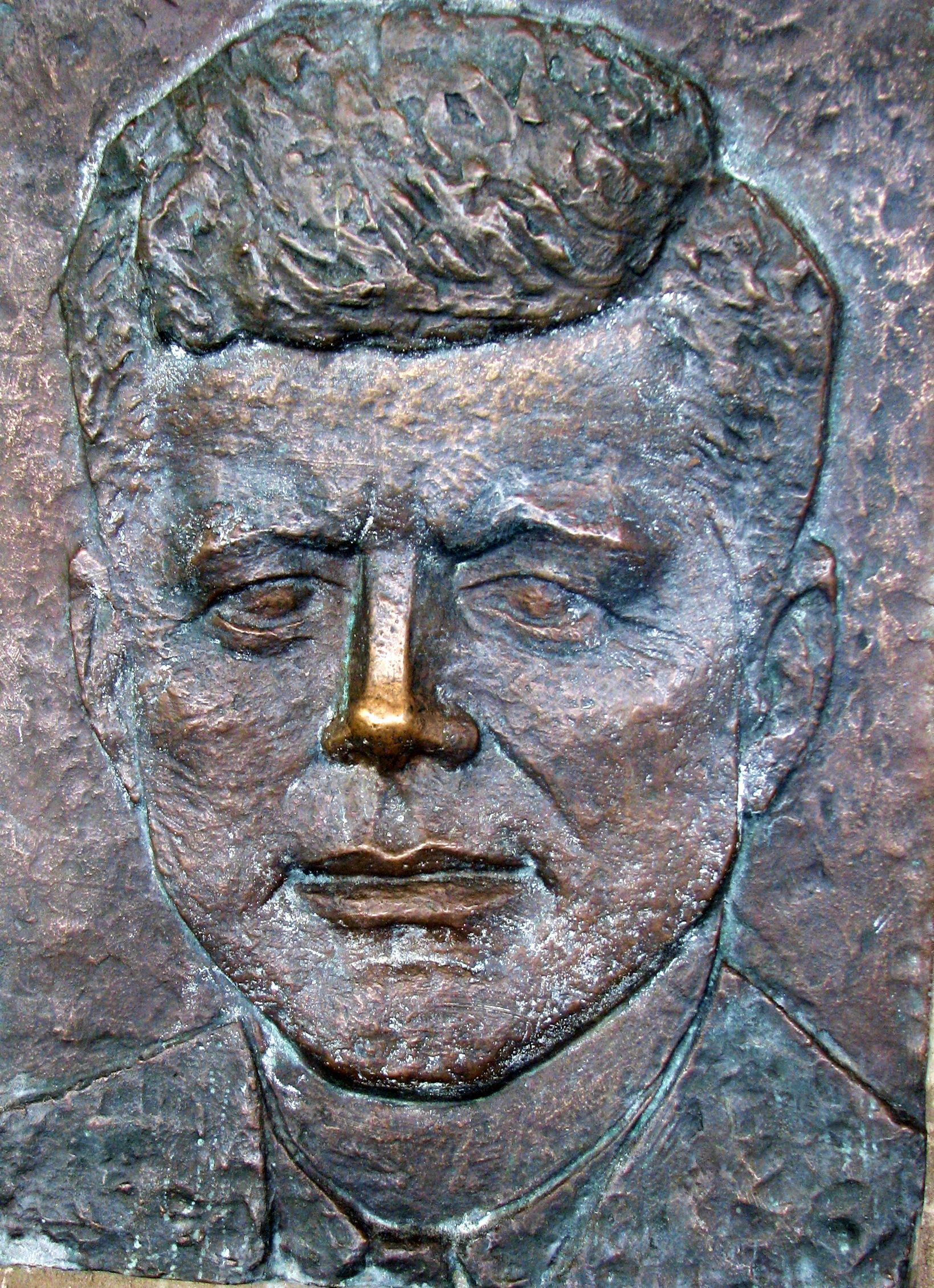
Bronze relief of John F. Kennedy at Yad Kennedy

Yad Kennedy was designed by the Brazilian-born Israeli architect David Resnick, who later won the 1995 Israel Prize in architecture, and the Ukrainian-born Israeli sculptor Dov Feigin. Feigin created the bust of Kennedy along with a memorial wall that includes excerpts from a number of Kennedy's speeches. Resnick said that "the entire complex is intended to symbolize the vigor of a great man whose life was tragically ended in mid-growth by assassination".

Resnick was awarded the contract to design the memorial after a nationwide competition. His initial vision for the memorial was a "free form" but generally circular shape, set within a reflecting pool. However, because money was being raised for the memorial by groups in all 50 states in the U.S., as well as groups in Washington, D.C., a vision of columns for each of those locations ultimately helped him come up with the concept of a tree trunk, linked to the idea that Kennedy's life had been cut down like a tree that is felled in its prime. The courtyard below the memorial includes a number of plaques acknowledging contributions by individuals and groups.

In addition to the Kennedy relief and eternal flame, papers and photographs relating to the subject of Israel-United States relations until the time of Kennedy's assassination are kept in a small library.

In 1974, a picnic site was added on the grounds of the memorial, open to visitors. The JNF announced that the site would "include rustic benches and tables, water facilities and shaded eating areas," and would be "close to the impressive stone and metal memorial–but far enough away not to pollute the area."

== Kennedy Peace Forest ==
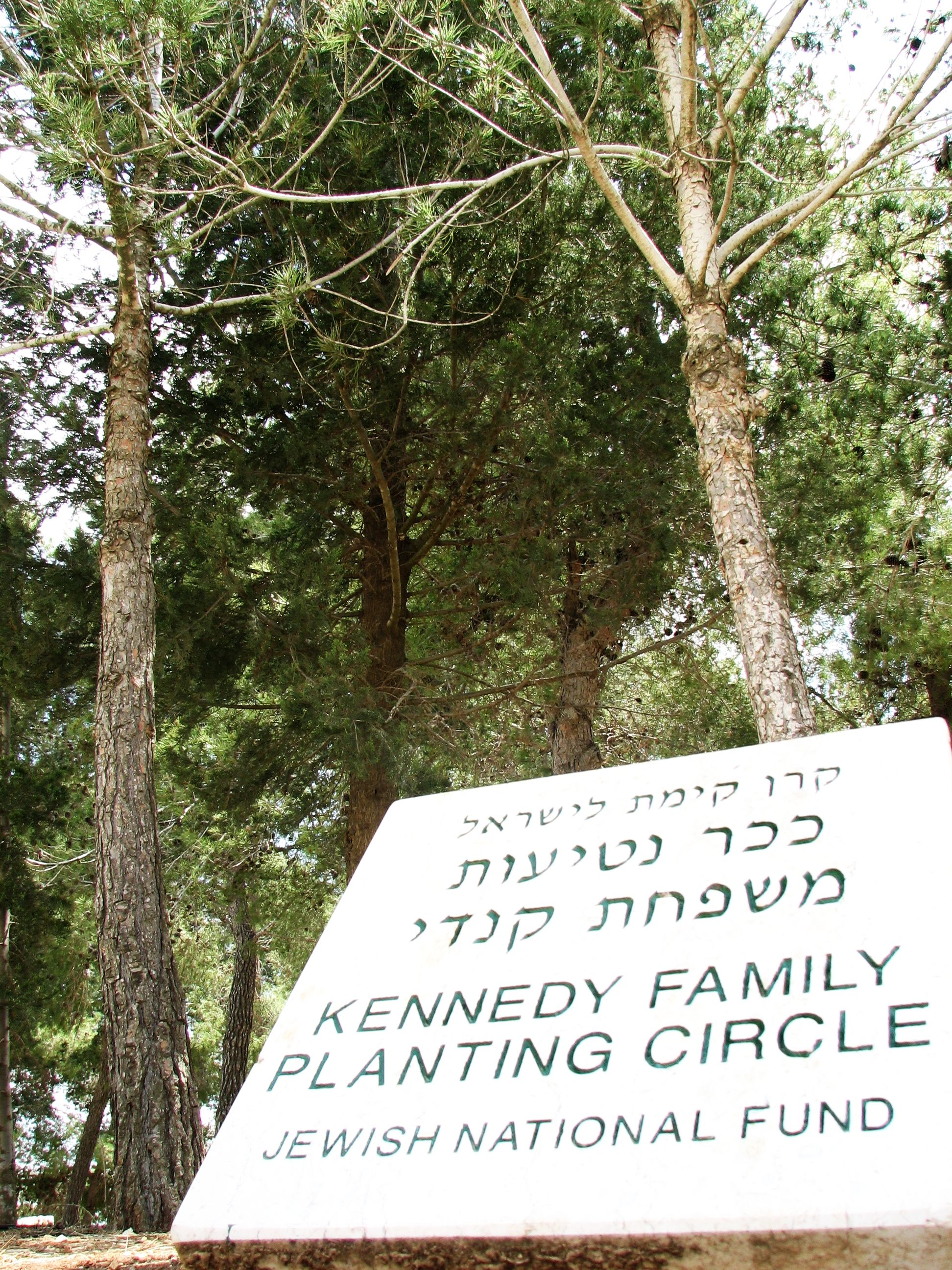
Kennedy Family Planting Circle

The Kennedy Peace Forest was dedicated before the memorial, with official dedication ceremonies taking place on 22 November 1964, on the first anniversary of Kennedy's assassination.

In June 1966 Jewish National Fund officials announced that 1.5 million trees had already been planted in the forest in preparation for the memorial's planned 4 July dedication ceremonies. The announcement noted that another 2 million trees had been planted in the adjoining "United States Freedom Forest," with a goal of planting 5.5 million trees in the two forests, as a number equal to the Jewish population of the United States. More than three million dollars in donations had been received at that point for the Kennedy Forest, from more than 100,000 donors.

In June 1968, the JNF announced it would plant 500,000 trees in the Kennedy Forest in memory of John F. Kennedy's brother, Robert F. Kennedy, assassinated on 6 June of that year. In 1999, JNF announced that trees would also be planted in memory of John F. Kennedy Jr., his wife Carolyn Bessette-Kennedy, and sister-in-law Lauren Bessette, all victims of a 16 July 1999 plane crash in the ocean off Martha's Vineyard, Massachusetts.

In April 1989 a forest fire (possibly the result of arson) destroyed approximately 8 acres (3.2 ha) and 3000 trees in the forest.

== Special events ==
Among the many special events that have taken place at the memorial was a visit by a number of officers and crew members from the United States aircraft carrier USS John F. Kennedy (CV67), named in honor of the same U.S. president memorialized by this monument, during a 1997 port visit to Haifa.

=== Tree planting ===
A VIP Kennedy Memorial tree planting center is included on the grounds of the memorial, where many distinguished visitors from other countries have planted trees. In May 1978 Jacqueline Kennedy, widow of the president, visited the memorial and planted a tree in the forest. Other members of the Kennedy family who have visited the memorial and planted trees include U.S. Senator Ted Kennedy (JFK's brother), on 11 December 1986; Joan Kennedy (Teddy Kennedy's first wife), on 24 January 1983; and Robert F. Kennedy Jr. and his sister Kathleen Kennedy Townsend (JFK's nephew and niece; children of Robert F. Kennedy), on 1 January 1987. A special "Kennedy Family Planting Circle" was established by the Jewish National Fund. In 2001 Kennedy's daughter Kathleen Kennedy Townsend, then Lieutenant Governor of Maryland, visited Yad Kennedy during her tour of Israel with her husband and three of her four daughters.

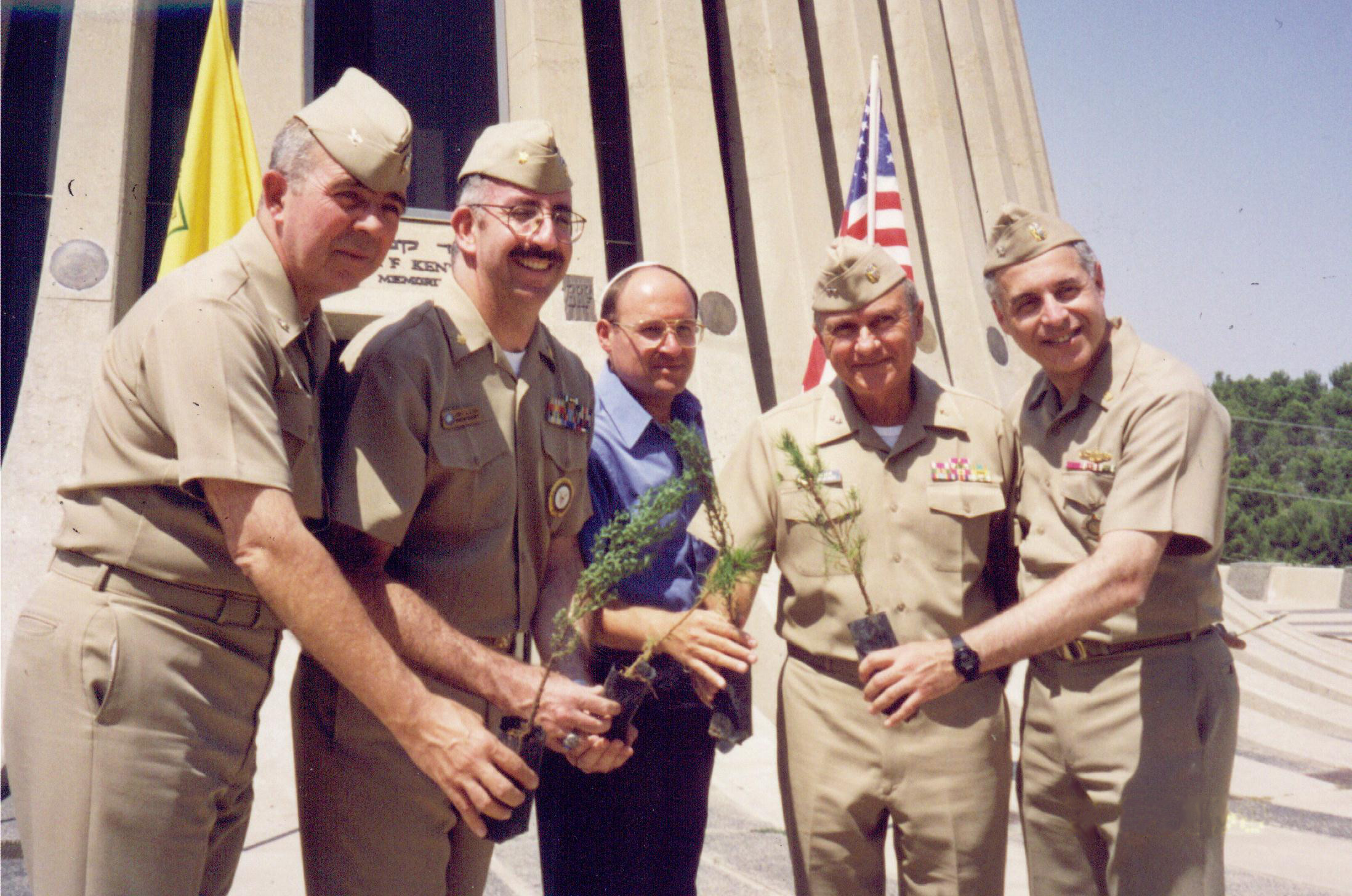
U.S. Navy chaplains including Chief of Chaplains Rear Admiral Byron Holderby (second from right) plant trees during a 1998 visit to Yad Kennedy

Visiting American military personnel are among those who plant trees at the memorial because of its remembrance of an American president. Among those who have planted trees at the site are former Chiefs of Chaplains of the United States Army, Navy, and Air Force.

Israeli groups also take part in the tree planting tradition, especially on the Jewish holiday of Tu Bishvat, an occasion linked to trees. On some occasions as many as 4000 Israeli school children have come to the Kennedy Peace Forest to plant trees on that holiday.

In addition to individual or group tree plantings, there have been special occasions when smaller "forests" have been dedicated within the larger John F. Kennedy Peace Forest. For example, as early as January 1966, even before the dedication of the memorial, a forest was planted in honor of Ambassador Avraham Harman, Israel's ambassador to the United States. The "Avraham Harman Forest" was contributed by Bnai Zion, a pro-Israel "fraternal group" in the U.S., and Golda Meir, newly retired from her post as Israel's Prime Minister, was one of the participants in the dedication ceremony.

Other specially designated areas within the larger John F. Kennedy Peace Forest include a "woodland" set up to memorialize the victims of the 1972 Lydda airport (now named Ben Gurion International Airport) terrorist attack.

== Gallery ==
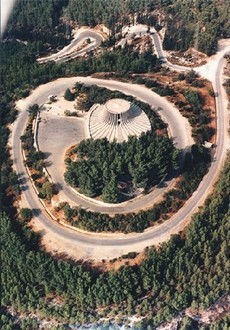
Aerial view

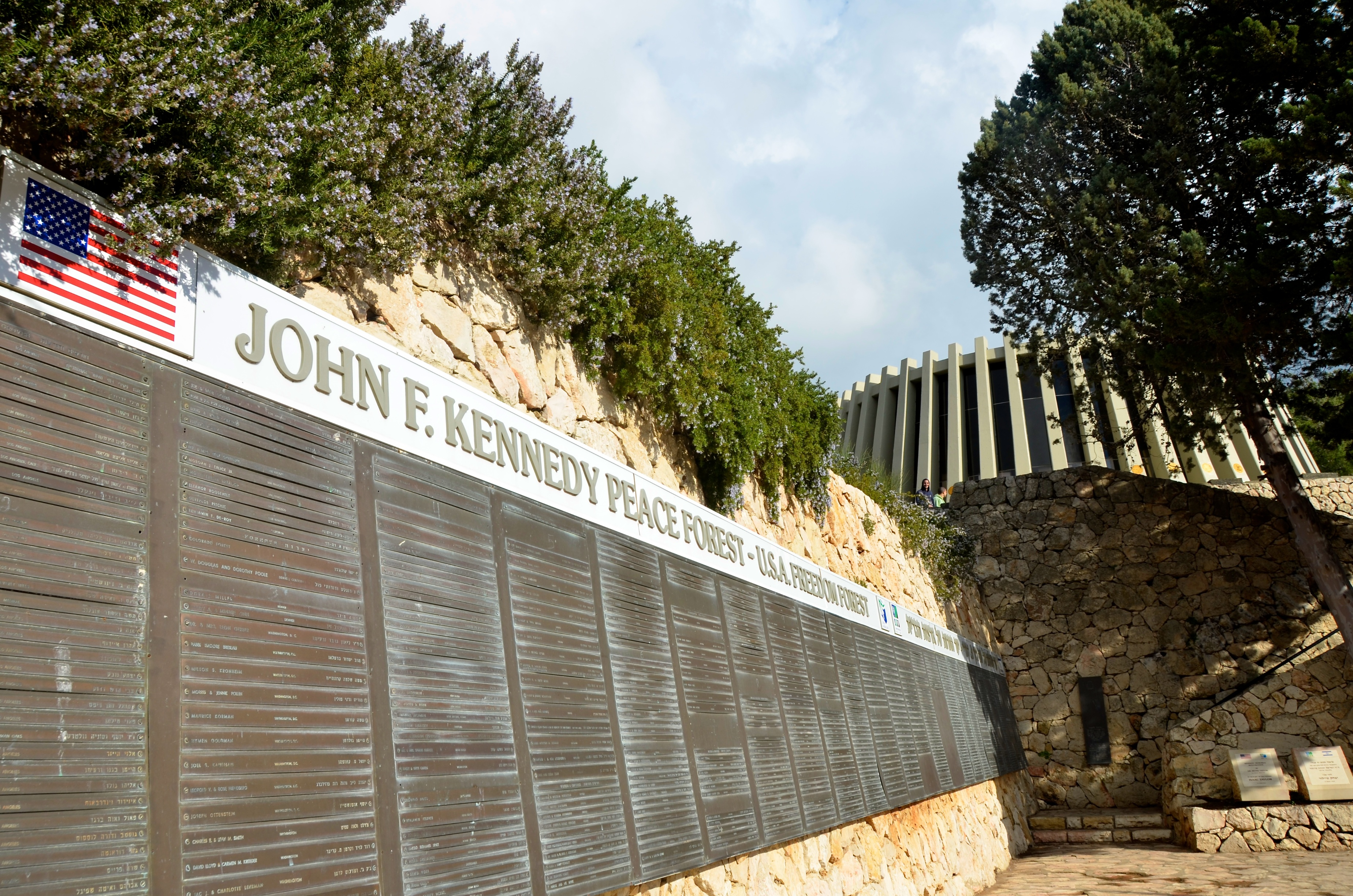
Forest and memorial
Donor Wall

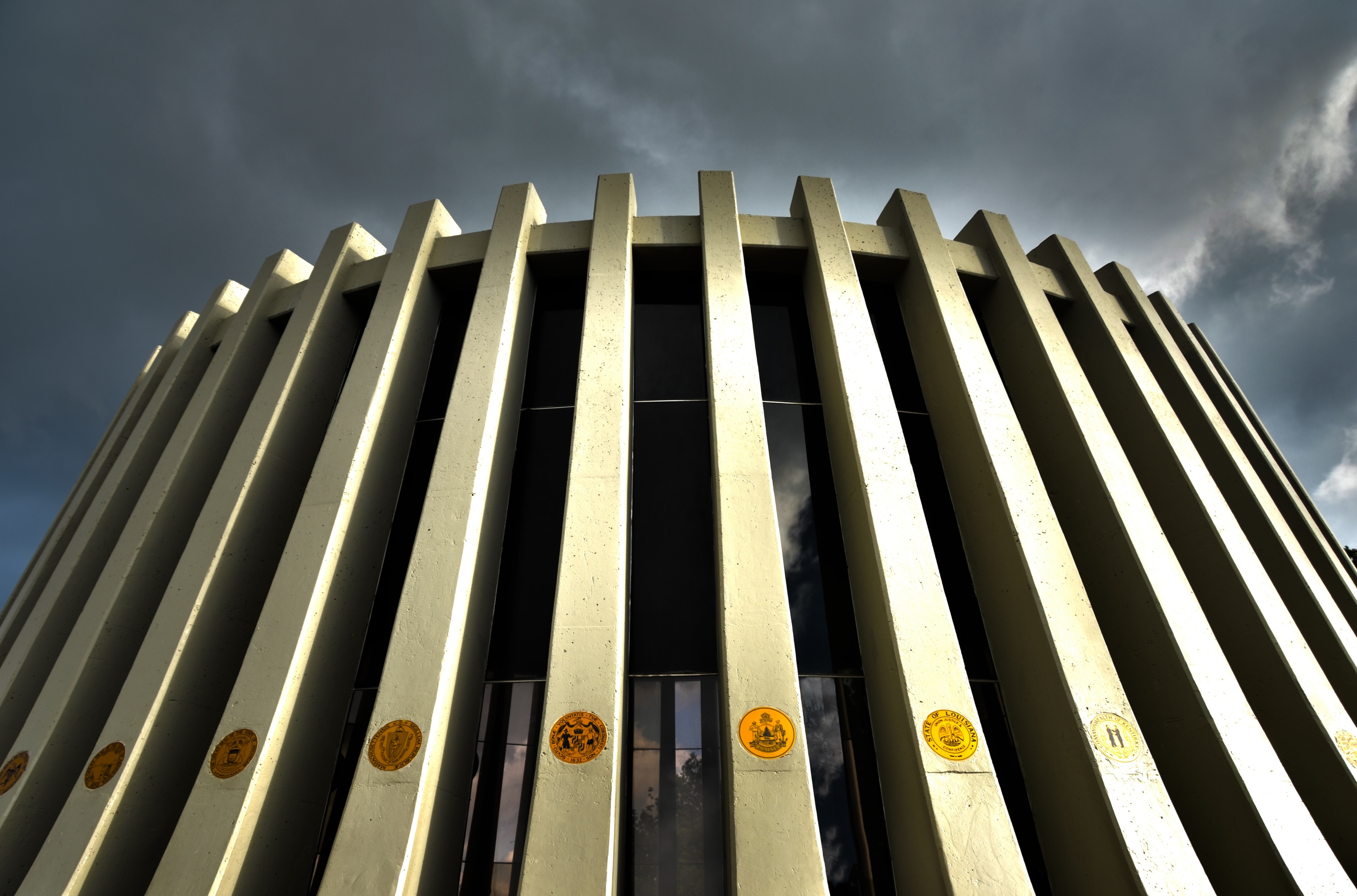
Emblems on memorial columns

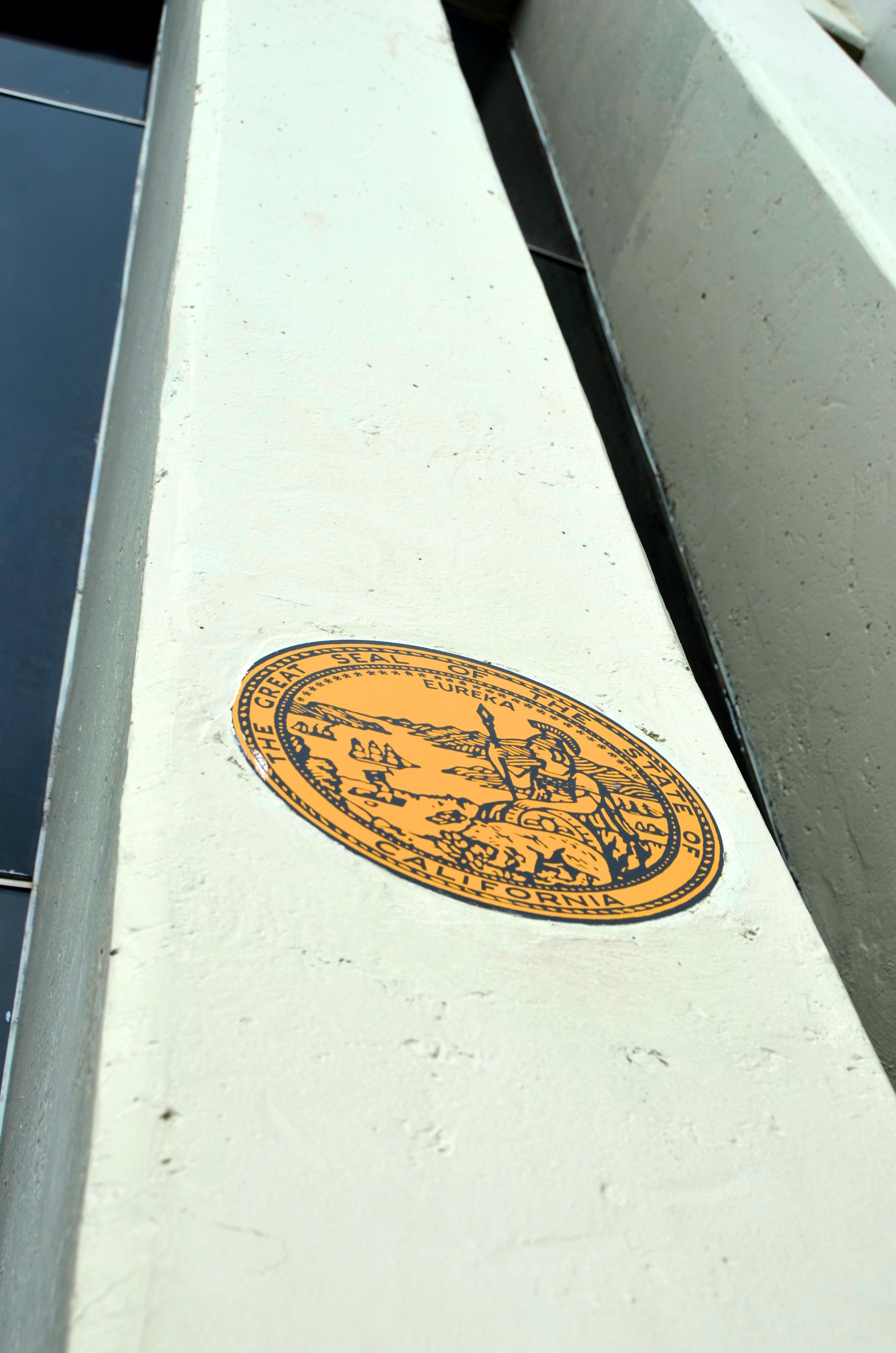
Sample State emblem (California)

== See also ==
- John F. Kennedy#Israel
- Memorials to John F. Kennedy
