= David Resnick =

Israeli architect and town planner

David Resnick דוד רזניק
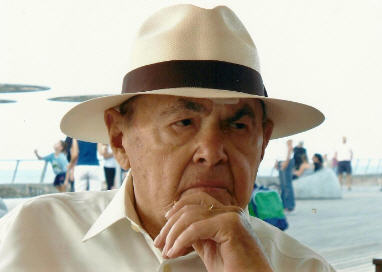
- David Resnick, Architect and town planner
- Born: 5 August 1924; Rio de Janeiro, Brazil
- Died: November 4, 2012 (aged 88)
- Occupation: Architect
- Awards: Israel Prize; Rechter Prize
- Practice: David Reznik Baruch Reznik Architects & Town Planners
- Buildings: Rabbi Dr. I. Goldstein Synagogue; Jerusalem Hyatt Regency; Yad Kennedy; Agron House

David Reznik (Hebrew: דוד רזניק; August 5, 1924 – November 4, 2012) was a Brazilian-born Israeli architect and town planner whose awards include the Israel Prize in architecture and the Rechter Prize. Resnick, whose name is sometimes spelled in English as "Reznik" or "Reznick," is a past director of the Israeli Architects Association, and is known as one of Israel's "most celebrated modern architects".

== Life ==
Resnick was born in Rio de Janeiro, where he was raised in a secular Zionist home. He edited his school's student newspaper, and was hired—while still a student—by the firm of Oscar Niemeyer, "the greatest Brazilian architect of the 20th century." Resnick worked alongside Niemeyer for four years, stating that during that time he learned the modernist principles of architecture from Niemeyer, whom Resnick describes as a "revolutionary and a genius."

During his time as an architect in Brazil, Resnick joined a Hashomer Hatzair training program, where he met and married his wife Rachel. In 1949, they immigrated to Israel, settling in Kibbutz Ein Hashofet. Resnick has stated that after World War II, the Holocaust, and the establishment of Israel, he and Rachel were among a number of "idealistic Brazilian-Jewish youngsters" who made the decision to move to Israel. Resnick worked in the fields of the kibbutz for two years, and has stated that even though he moved to the city to follow his career in architecture, his sense of social commitment has always remained with him.

In Israel, Resnick later moved to Tel Aviv, where he began working at the firm of Zeev Rechter. Three years later, he moved to Jerusalem, going into partnership with architect Heinrich Heinz Rau. In 1958, Resnick established his own practice. His work with these two architects has been referred to as one of the most important steps in his career, because now "The architect from Brazil became part of the connection between the architectural heritage of the British Mandate and the architecture of Jerusalem as the capital of a Jewish state."

Resnick died on November 4, 2012, and was buried the next day in the Har Hamenuchot Cemetery in Jerusalem, in the section designated for "notable citizens."

== Works ==
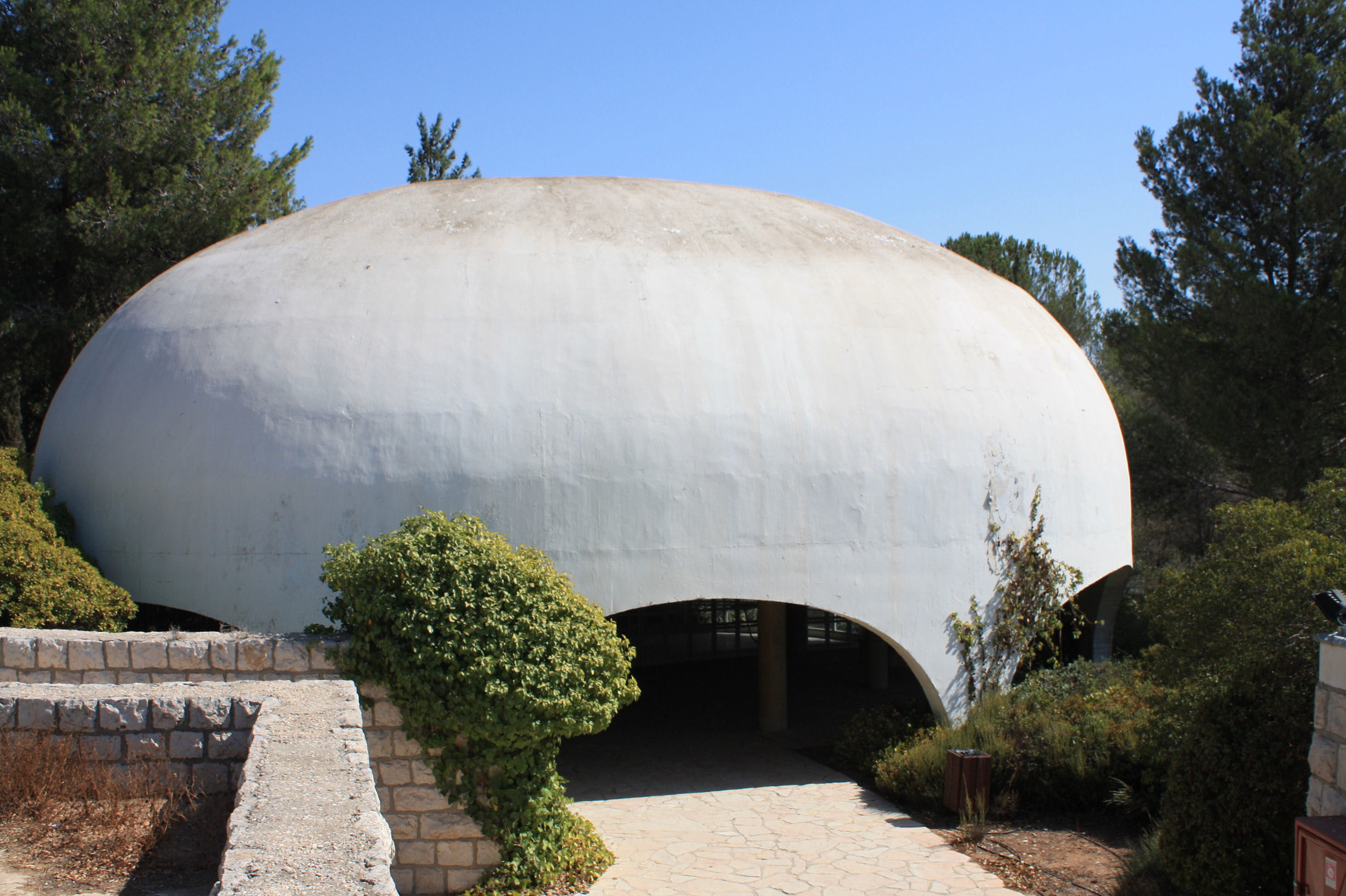
Rabbi Dr. I. Goldstein Synagogue, Hebrew University

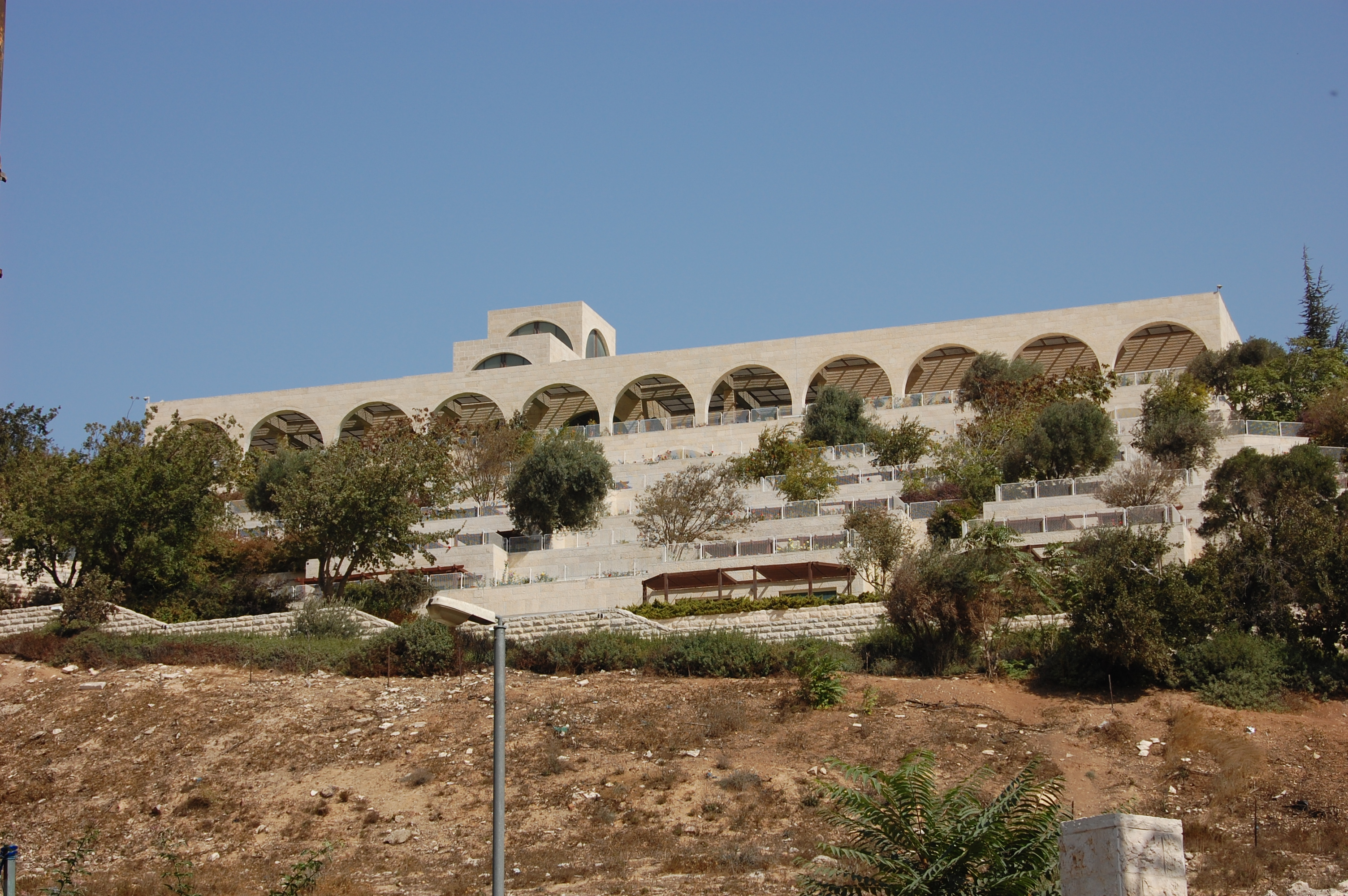
Brigham Young University Jerusalem Center, Israel

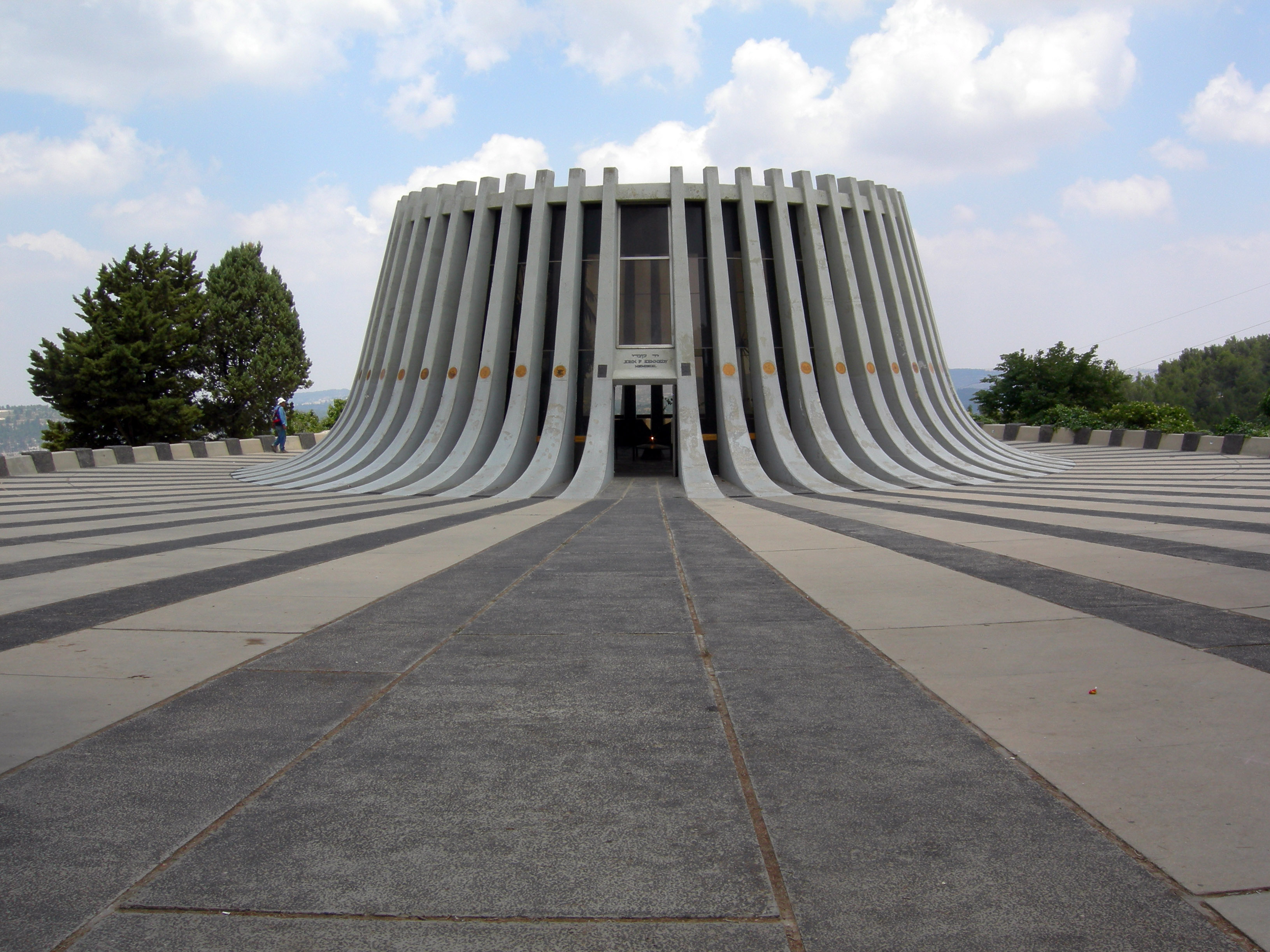
Yad Kennedy (John F. Kennedy Memorial), Israel

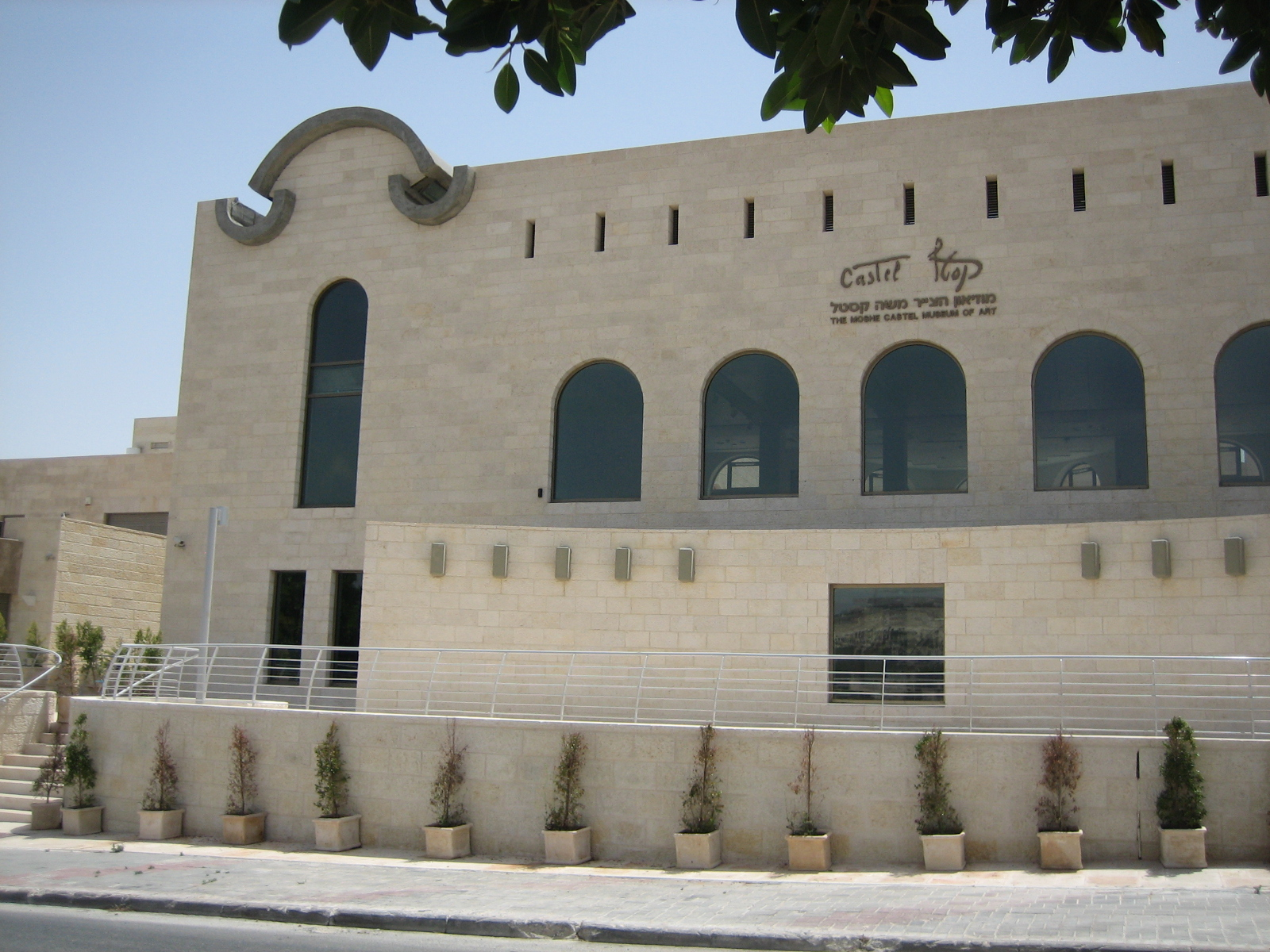
Moshe Kastel Museum, Ma'ale Adumim

Resnick's early works with Rau included the Rabbi Dr. I. Goldstein Synagogue and the Einstein Institute of Mathematics on the Givat Ram campus of Israel's Hebrew University. The university synagogue has been listed as one of the "ten most beautiful synagogues in Israel." The design has been described as one that "takes the form of a gentle concrete puffball hovering just above the surface of the rock, rather as if it had been tossed there by the wind." It has been referred to as "without a doubt, a landmark in local architecture." Another structure designed by Resnick (along with Arthur Spector and Michael Amisar) whose style is sometimes compared to the synagogue is the war memorial of 1974-77: a cleft monumental stone pyramid on a set of structures that, according to Resnick, were supposed to create an impression of a fallen empire.

In 1958, shortly after leaving his partnership with Rau to work on his own, Resnick was asked to design the "Amir Center," a residential building in the center of Jerusalem. After the Amir Center, his projects included the Van Leer Jerusalem Institute and Hebrew University's Mount Scopus campus.

His other works in Israel include Jerusalem's Hyatt Regency Hotel, the Brigham Young University Jerusalem Center, Yad Kennedy (the John F. Kennedy Memorial outside of Jerusalem), and the Antiquities Museum in Hatzor (in Kibbutz Ayyelet ha-Shahar), and the Soldiers Home complex (Yad lebanim). The assignment to create Yad Kennedy was the result of a nationwide competition. A memorial to the life of U.S. President John F. Kennedy and his assassination in 1963, the 60 feet (18 m) high memorial is shaped like the trunk of a felled tree, symbolizing a life cut short.

Resnick's other major buildings include the Israel National Academy of Sciences. In addition to designing independent buildings and memorials, Resnick is also the architect for a number of private homes and the town planner for a number of neighborhoods.

His works outside of Israel include the Israeli embassy in Rio de Janeiro and he co-created the Israel Pavilion for Expo '67, in Montreal, Quebec, Canada, along with Arieh Sharon. Although Israel ultimately decided to withdraw from participation in the 1964 New York World Fair because of funding problems, the cabinet had originally approved funding and chosen Resnick to design its pavilion after he won Israel's national architectural competition for the project. According to the catalogue, "David Reznik: A Retrospective":

"The pavilion was designed as a truncated fortress, with only a few narrow, horizontal openings; it was three levels high, the movement between levels flowing on a sloping spiral ramp. The corners were rounded to create an elegant silhouette, softening its heavy appearance, and the surface was covered with rough plaster."

Resnick's design ultimately served as the basis for the Israeli exhibit at the Montreal 1967 fair. The pavilion was demolished in 1975.

In 2011 Resnick designed the Moshe Castel Museum of Art in Maalei Adumim, where the works of Israeli artist Moshe Castel are housed. Resnick's work included input from Castel himself.

Reznik continued to work at his firm, known as "David Reznik Baruch Reznik Architects & Town Planners, up to his death in 2012."

=== Town planning ===
In addition to his work as an architect on independent buildings and memorials, Resnick's work as a town planner includes the neighborhoods in Kiryat Hasidim, Hatzor Haglilit, Modi'in and Beit Shemesh. One of his earliest town planning projects was the community of Nayot, created during the years 1959–1962. The project was developed for immigrants from English-speaking countries, and the resulting community was based on a design that included uniformity in terms of the outside structure and individuality in terms of interior spaces—while at the same time incorporating the community into the outside landscape, including the mountain slope. As one resident described it, Nayot was a "truly residential neighborhood...combining individual autonomy with communal interests, ensuring a high quality of life."

=== Retrospective ===
In 2005 a retrospective of Resnick's works was opened at Tel Aviv University's Genia Schreiber University Art Gallery. According to the exhibition curator Sophia Dekel-Caspi, twenty works were featured in the exhibition, selected to "illustrate the development of Reznik's architectural language and the unique characteristics of his work - at once modernist and humanistic.... Reznik incorporated stark and clean elements of Modernism in his designs, but never at the expense of coherence with the surroundings; or the comfort and ease of use by people.”

The Israeli Ministry of Education, Sport and Culture and the Ministry of Foreign Affairs selected the retrospective exhibition to represent Israel at Brazil's Biennale of art in São Paulo.

== Views ==
In a 1994 article, Resnick stated that architects in Israel are "finding a new idiom. In pre-independence days, architects used elements that were already shaped in Europe. After 46 years of statehood, we are reaching a new maturity and are growing more confident." He stated that in Israel architects—like archeologists—look into the "sources of the Jewish people" to find their "architectural identity."

In 1997 Resnick was quoted as saying that he worried that skyscrapers might one day ruin the "mystical city" of Jerusalem. He felt that the city was "like a virgin," that can't be touched in certain places. According to him, "there are only certain places we should build on her landscape."

Resnick has called Jerusalem a "melancholy place," and stated that some of his works (such as the synagogue on the Hebrew University Givat Ram campus) were envisioned to evoke that feeling.

== Positions ==
Resnick held a number of positions in both professional and cultural organizations including service as Director of the Association of Israeli Architects and President of the Institute for Cultural Relations between Israel and Ibero-America.

== Honors and awards ==
Resnick was awarded the Israel Prize in Architecture in 1995, and the Rechter Prize in 1964. The Rechter Prize (whose formal title is the Yaakov and Zev Rechter Prize for Architects) was co-awarded to Heinz Rau and Resnick for the Israel Goldstein Synagogue on the Hebrew University's Givat Ram campus.

In 2006, Resnick was invested as an honorary fellow of the American Institute of Architects (European division). Honorary investment to the AIA's College of Fellows "bestowed on architects of esteemed character and distinguished achievements who are neither US citizens nor US residents, and who do not primarily practice architecture within the domain of the Institute."

Resnick's other honors include the 2009 award for architecture from Jerusalem's Bezalel Academy of Arts and Design.

== See also ==
- Architecture of Israel
- List of Jewish architects
