= Israel Goldstein =

American rabbi

- ישראל גולדשטיין
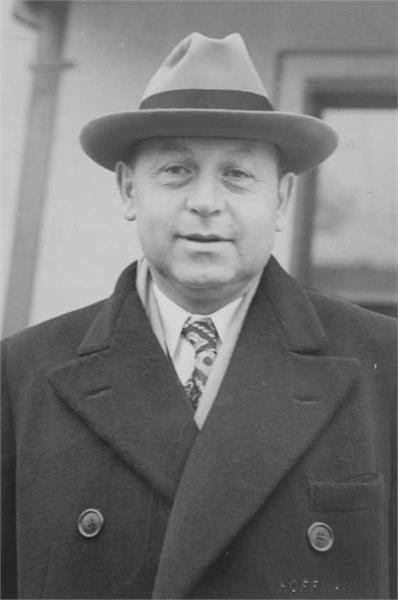
- Born: Israel Goldstein; June 18, 1896; Philadelphia, Pennsylvania, U.S.
- Died: April 11, 1986 (aged 89); Jerusalem, Israel
- Education: University of Pennsylvania
- Occupations: Head of the Zionist Organization of America, American Jewish Congress, Jewish National Fund of America, and New York Board of Rabbis

Signature
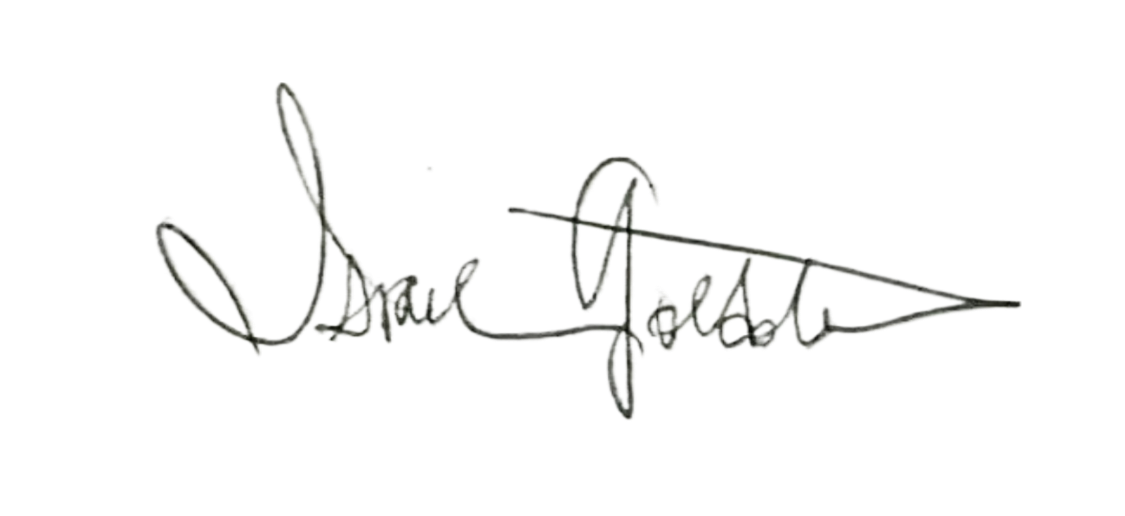

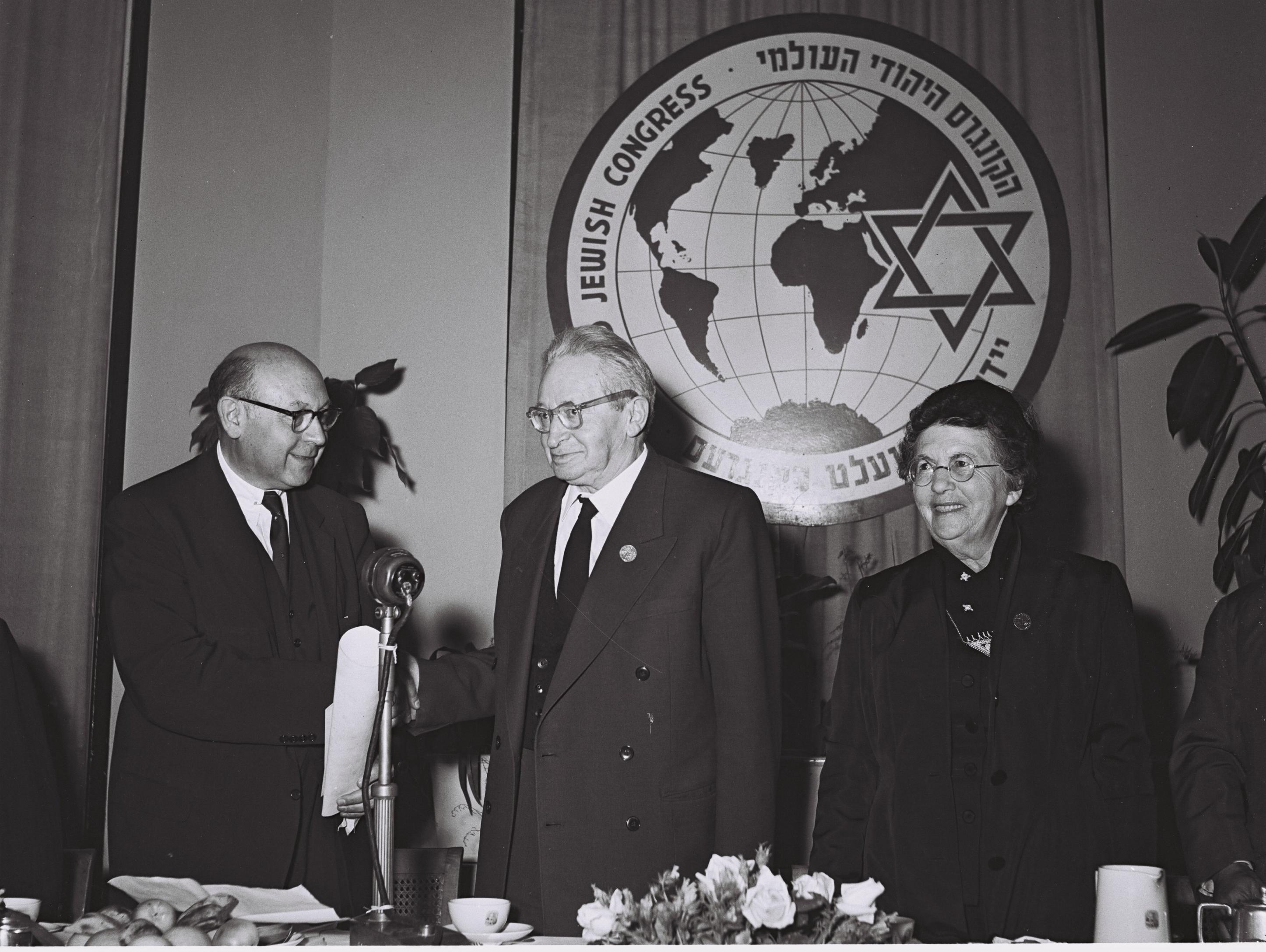
Dr. Israel Goldstein awards the Stephen Wise Award to President Yitzhak Ben Zvi at the World Jewish Congress held in 1956 at the King David Hotel in Jerusalem.

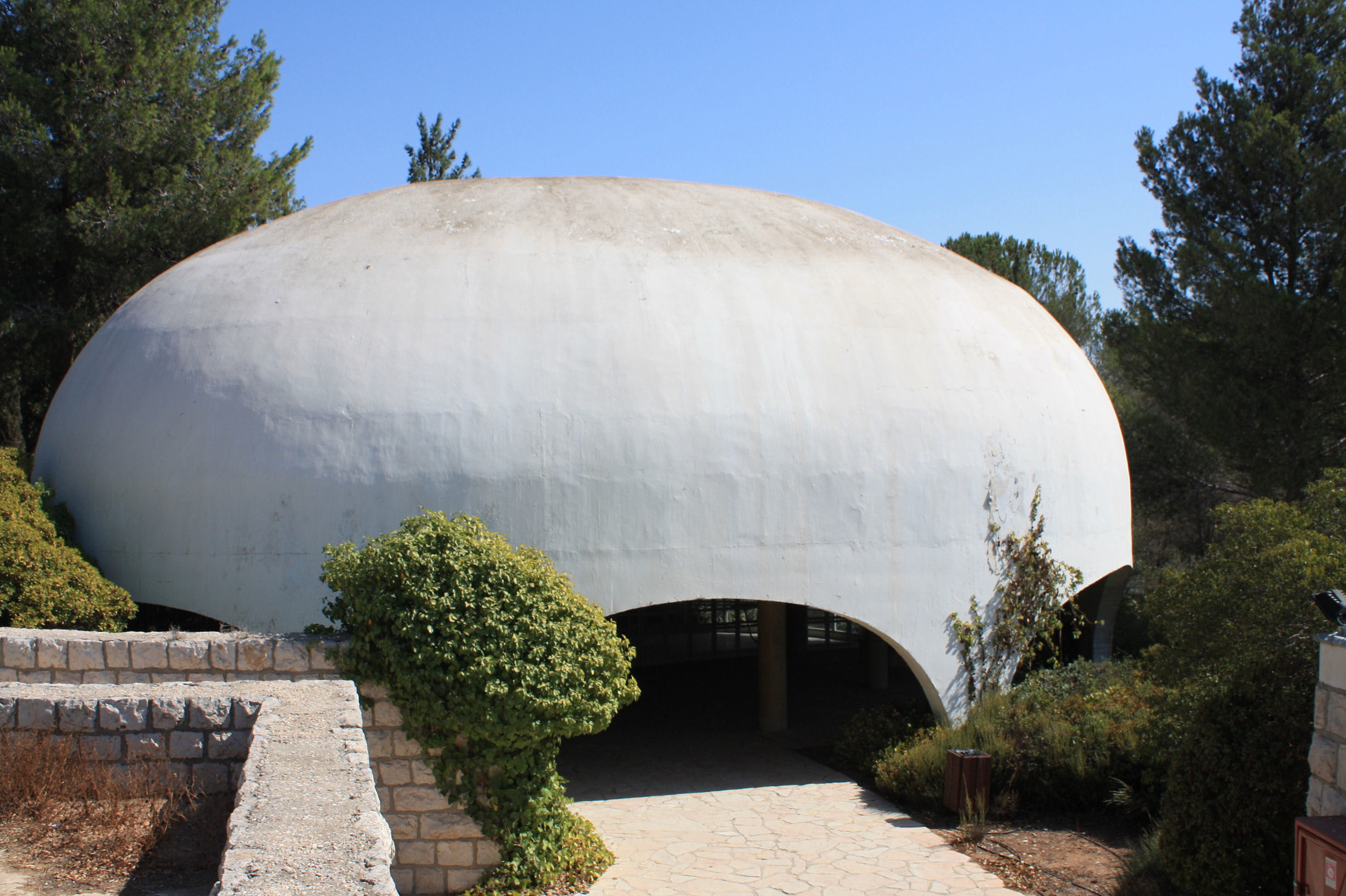
Rabbi Dr. I. Goldstein Synagogue, Hebrew University

Israel Goldstein (Hebrew: ישראל גולדשטיין; June 18, 1896 – April 11, 1986) was an American-born Israeli rabbi, author and Zionist leader.

== Early life and education ==
Goldstein, born in Philadelphia, was a noteworthy graduate of South Philadelphia High School (SPHS) in 1911. At that time the school program was manual training, but his record showed to school administrators that there was more promise for academics servicing the immigrant population of South Philadelphia. He graduated the school at age 14. In 1911, while finishing his high school degree, he also completed a Bachelor of Hebrew Letters (B.H.L.) at Philadelphia's Gratz College, which is the oldest independent Jewish College in the United States. He graduated from the University of Pennsylvania at the age of 17. Later he attended the Jewish Theological Seminary where he was ordained in 1918 and received his Doctorate of Hebrew Letters (D.H.L.) in 1927 .

== Rabbinic career and Zionist activity ==
From 1918 until his immigration to Israel in 1960, Israel Goldstein served as the rabbi of Congregation B'nai Jeshurun in New York, the second oldest synagogue in the city. He was head of the New York Board of Rabbis (1928–30), the Jewish National Fund of America (1934-1943), the Zionist Organization of America (1943-1946), and American Jewish Congress (1952-1959), and helped found the National Conference of Christians and Jews.

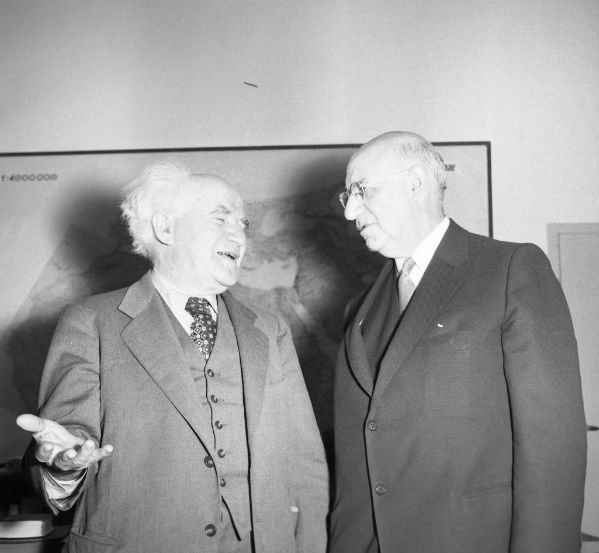
Goldstein with David Ben-Gurion in 1958

In 1945, he was a consultant to the U.S. delegation at the Founding Conference of the United Nations in San Francisco.

From 1961 to 1971, Goldstein was World Chairman of Keren Hayesod-United Israel Appeal. He led Keren Hayesod during a period of expansion and growth, particularly after the Six-Day War.

== Death ==
Israel Goldstein died on April 11, 1986, at Shaare Zedek Hospital in Jerusalem after a long illness.

== Published works ==
- Century of Judaism in New York (1930)
- Towards a Solution (1940)
- Shanah b’Yisrael (Next Year in Israel; 1950)
- American Jewry Comes of Age (1955)
- Brandeis University - Chapter of its Founding
- Transition Years, New York-Jerusalem, 1960-1962 (1966)
- Israel at Home and Abroad (1977)
- My World as a Jew: The Memoirs of Israel Goldstein (1984)

== Honors and commemoration ==
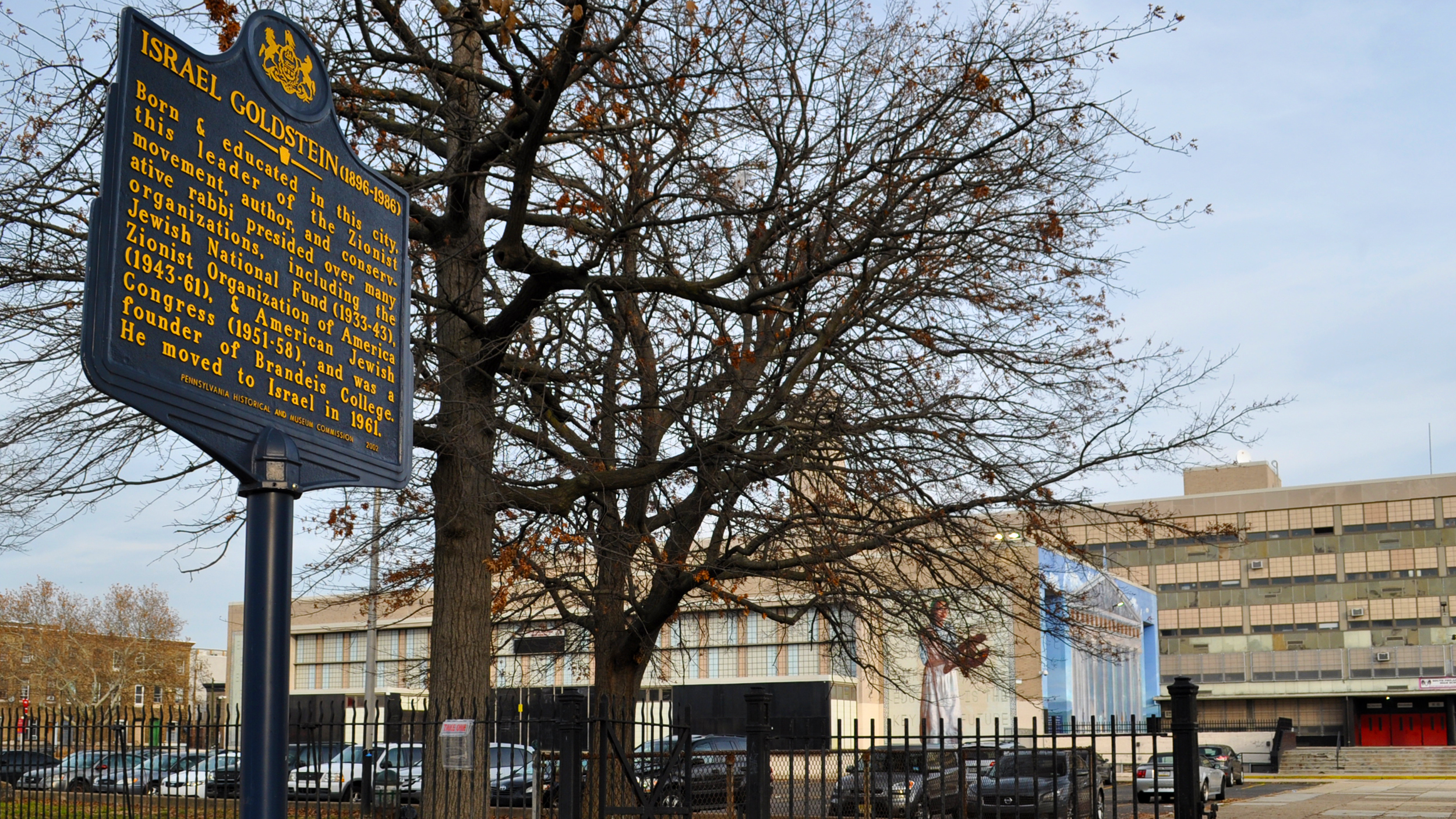
Israel Goldstein Historical Marker at South Philadelphia High School

Dr. Goldstein has been inducted into the SPHS Alumni Cultural Hall of Fame.

In 1947, more than 1,000 acres of Jewish National Fund land situated between Gaza and Lachish were named "Chevel Goldstein" (lit. "Goldstein's region") in his honor.

The Israel Goldstein Youth Village, whose director he was, is named after him. Established in 1949, it is a Zionist youth village in the Katamon neighborhood of Jerusalem.

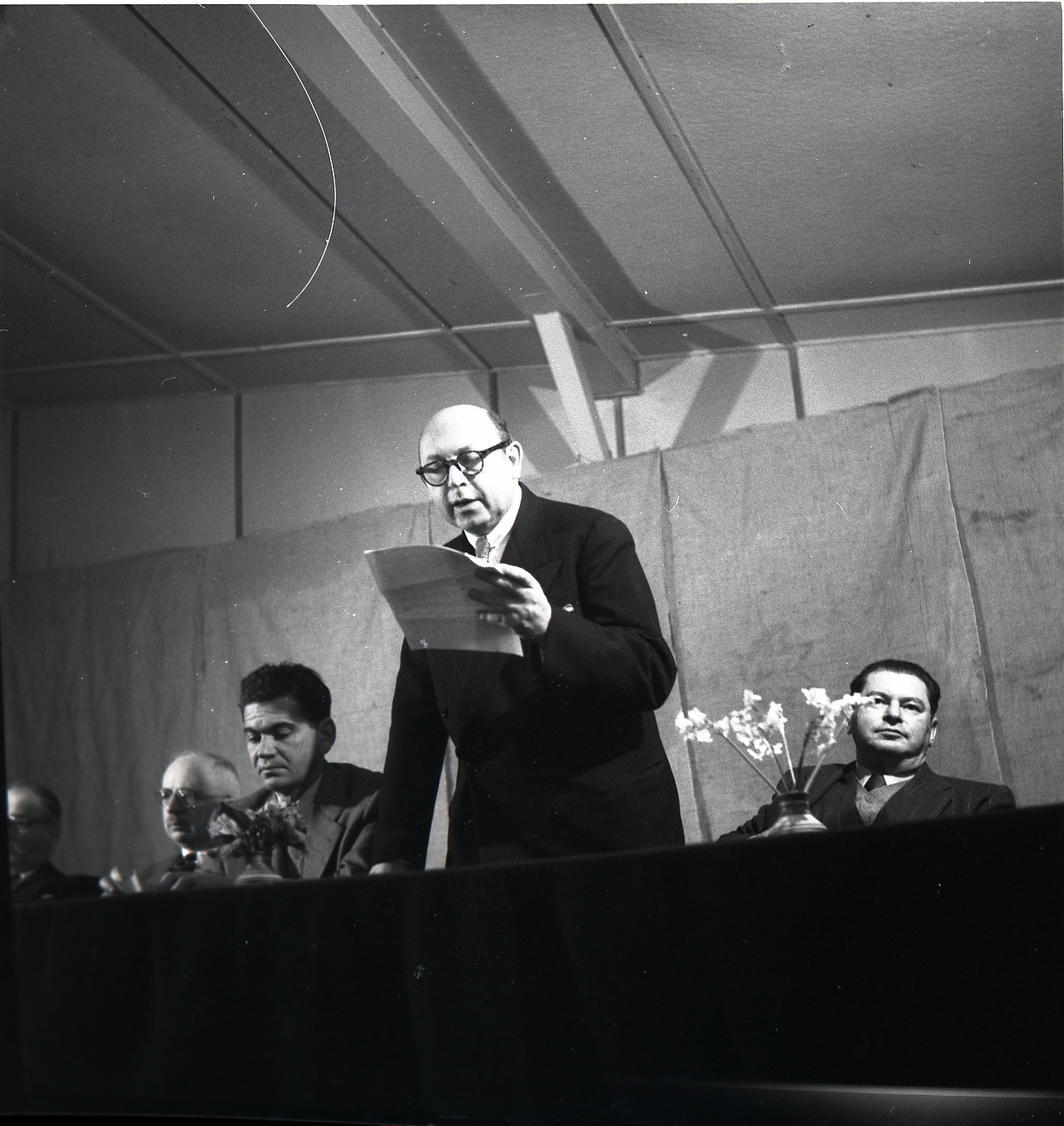
Goldstein speaking at the Israel Goldstein Youth Village in 1950

On his eightieth birthday, Israeli prime minister Yitzhak Rabin and other government and Zionist movement officials gathered at his home to pay him tribute.

The Rabbi Dr. I. Goldstein Synagogue on the Givat Ram campus of the Hebrew University of Jerusalem was built in his honor.

The Israel Goldstein Prize for Distinguished Leadership is the highest honor bestowed by Keren Hayesod. The prize has been awarded annually since 1980, the 60th anniversary of Keren Hayesod.
