= Umhlanga Jewish Centre =

Modern Orthodox Jewish Community Center in South Africa

Religion
- Affiliation: Modern Orthodox Judaism
- Rite: Nusach Ashkenaz
- Ecclesiastical or organizational status: Synagogue
- Leadership: Rabbi Gilad Friedman
- Status: Active

Location
- Location: 81 Campbell Dr, Izinga Ridge, Blackburn, 4319, South Africa
- Country: South Africa

Architecture
- Type: Synagogue architecture
- Established: 2014 (as a congregation)
- Completed: 2014

Umhlanga Jewish Centre (UJC) is a Modern Orthodox synagogue, Jewish Day School and Jewish Community Centre, situated in uMhlanga, an area north of Durban.

The centre is situated on the new 20,000-square-metre fenced security estate, Izinga and also includes an auditorium, Kollel, function hall, mikveh and kosher kitchen. The synagogue seats up to 350 worshipers.

On 17 June 2014, the centre was officially opened with a foundation-stone ceremony attended by South Africa's Chief Rabbi Warren Goldstein.

== History ==
The UJC was first conceived by Rabbi Pinchas Zekry, long-time rabbi of the Durban United Hebrew Congregation. Rabbi Zekry could see that the Jewish community on the Beara was shrinking as families migrated northwards of the city to Umhlanga.

The UJC was dedicated in 2014, with Rabbi Zekry addressing the congregation. Chief Rabbi Warren Goldstein, Jonathan Beare and Beit Din head Rabbi, Moshe Kurtstag were also in attendance. As well as the centre's dedication, the ceremony incorporated the opening of the Mikveh facility, the Beit Midrash library and a new media centre for Akiva College.

The UJC has the only daily minyan in Durban, shacharit, mincha, maariv and daily shiurim. Shabbat services include wonderful davening, a youth programme in a thriving community.

== See also ==
- Durban Jewish Club
