= Rechter Prize =

- Awarded for: Israeli architecture
- Country: Israel
- First award: 1962; 64 years ago

The Rechter Prize is an Israeli architecture prize awarded bi-annually and intended to "encourage landmark projects of Israeli architecture". It was established in 1962 and name in honour of Ze'ev Rechter.
