= 2003 ASP World Tour =

Professional surfing league season

The 2003 ASP World Tour is a professional competitive surfing league. It is run by the Association of Surfing Professionals.

== Men's World Tour ==
=== Tournaments ===
| Date | Location | Country | Event | Winner | Runner-up | Ref |
|---|---|---|---|---|---|---|
| March 4-March 16 | Gold Coast | Australia | Quiksilver Pro Gold Coast | Dean Morrison (AUS) | Mark Occhilupo (AUS) | Report |
| April 16-April 26 | Bells Beach | Australia | Rip Curl Pro Bells Beach | Andy Irons (HAW) | Joel Parkinson (AUS) | Report |
| May 6-May 18 | Teahupoo, Tahiti | French Polynesia | Billabong Pro | Kelly Slater (USA) | Taj Burrow (AUS) | Report |
| May 26-June 4 | Tavarua | Fiji | Quiksilver Pro Fiji | Andy Irons (HAW) | Cory Lopez (USA) | Report |
| June 18-June 29 | Niijima Island | Japan | Niijima Quiksilver Pro | Andy Irons (HAW) | Joel Parkinson (AUS) | Report |
| July 15-July 25 | Jeffreys Bay | South Africa | Billabong Pro J-Bay | Kelly Slater (USA) | Damien Hobgood (USA) | Report |
| September 4-September 13 | Trestles | United States | Boost Mobile Pro | Richard Lovett (AUS) | Taj Burrow (AUS) | Report |
| September 30-October 11 | Hossegor | France | Quiksilver Pro France | Andy Irons (HAW) | Phillip MacDonald (AUS) | Report |
| October 12-October 24 | Mundaka | Spain | Billabong Pro Mundaka | Kelly Slater (USA) | Taj Burrow (AUS) | Report |
| October 27-November 4 | Santa Catarina | Brazil | Nova Schin Festival | Kelly Slater (USA) | Mick Fanning (AUS) | Report |
| November 24-December 7 | Sunset Beach, Hawaii | United States | Rip Curl Cup | Jake Paterson (AUS) | Andy Irons (HAW) | Report |
| December 8-December 20 | Pipeline, Hawaii | United States | Xbox Pipeline Masters | Andy Irons (HAW) | Joel Parkinson (AUS) | Report |

=== Final standings ===
| Rank | Name | Country | Points |
|---|---|---|---|
| 1 | Andy Irons | Hawaii | 8,964 |
| 2 | Kelly Slater | United States | 8,544 |
| 3 | Taj Burrow | Australia | 7,344 |
| 4 | Mick Fanning | Australia | 7,080 |
| 5 | Joel Parkinson | Australia | 6,972 |
| 6 | Kieren Perrow | Australia | 6,480 |
| 7 | Taylor Knox | United States | 6,000 |
| 8 | Michael Lowe | Australia | 5,820 |
| 9 | Cory Lopez | United States | 5,814 |
| 10 | Dean Morrison | Australia | 5,778 |

== Women's World Tour ==
=== Tournaments ===
| Date | Location | Country | Event | Winner | Runner-up | Ref |
|---|---|---|---|---|---|---|
| March 4-March 16 | Gold Coast | Australia | Roxy Pro Gold Coast | Layne Beachley (AUS) | Trudy Todd (AUS) | Report |
| April 27-May 3 | Tavarua | Fiji | Roxy Pro Fiji | Keala Kennelly (HAW) | Heather Clark (RSA) | Report |
| May 6-May 18 | Teahupoo, Tahiti | French Polynesia | Billabong Pro Tahiti | Keala Kennelly (HAW) | Rochelle Ballard (HAW) | Report |
| September 30-October 11 | South West Coast | France | Roxy Pro | Chelsea Georgeson (AUS) | Layne Beachley (AUS) | Report |
| December 8-December 20 | Honolua Bay, Hawaii | United States | Billabong Pro | Layne Beachley (AUS) | Samantha Cornish (AUS) | Report |

=== Final standings ===
| Rank | Name | Country | Points |
|---|---|---|---|
| 1 | Layne Beachley | Australia | 3,696 |
| 2 | Keala Kennelly | Hawaii | 3,516 |
| 3 | Heather Clark | South Africa | 3,240 |
| 4 | Chelsea Georgeson | Australia | 3,060 |
| 5 | Samantha Cornish | Australia | 2,664 |
| 6 | Trudy Todd | Australia | 2,436 |
| 7 | Sofía Mulánovich | Peru | 2,424 |
| 8 | Lynette MacKenzie | Australia | 2,220 |
| 9 | Rochelle Ballard | Hawaii | 2,052 |
| 10 | Jacqueline Silva | Brazil | 2,028 |
