= 2002 ASP World Tour =

Professional surfing league season

The 2002 ASP World Tour is a professional competitive surfing league. It is run by the Association of Surfing Professionals.

== Men's World Tour ==
=== Tournaments ===
Date	Location	Country	Event	Winner	Runner-up	Ref
March 5-March 17	Gold Coast	Australia	Quiksilver Pro	Joel Parkinson (AUS)	Cory Lopez (USA)	Report
March 6-April 7	Bells Beach	Australia	Rip Curl Pro	Andy Irons (HAW)	Sunny Garcia (HAW)	Report
May 7-May 18	Teahupoo, Tahiti	French Polynesia	Billabong Pro	Andy Irons (HAW)	Luke Egan (AUS)	Report
May 26-June 7	Tavarua	Fiji	Quiksiver Pro	Michael Lowe (AUS)	Shea Lopez (USA)	Report
July 16-July 22	Jeffreys Bay	South Africa	Billabong Pro	Mick Fanning (AUS)	Michael Lowe (AUS)	Report
September 6-September 14	Trestles	United States	Boost Mobile Pro	Luke Egan (AUS)	Michael Campbell (AUS)	Report
September 17-September 24	Figueira Da Foz	Portugal	Figueira Pro	Event Incomplete		Report
September 26-October 8	Hossegor	France	Quiksilver Pro	Neco Padaratz (BRA)	Andy Irons (HAW)	Report
October 9-October 21	Mundaka	Spain	Billabong Pro	Andy Irons (HAW)	Neco Padaratz (BRA)	Report
October 24-November 9	Saquarema	Brazil	Mundial Coca-Cola De Surf	Taj Burrow (AUS)	Mick Fanning (AUS)	Report
November 24-December 7	Sunset Beach, Hawaii	Hawaii	Rip Curl Cup	Joel Parkinson (AUS)	Lee Winkler (AUS)	Report
December 8-December 20	Pipeline, Hawaii	Hawaii	Xbox Pipeline Masters	Andy Irons (HAW)	Shane Dorian (HAW)	Report

=== Final standings ===
Rank	Name	Country	Points
1	Andy Irons	Hawaii	8,102
2	Joel Parkinson	Australia	6,556
3	Luke Egan	Australia	6,396
4	Taj Burrow	Australia	6,198
5	Mick Fanning	Australia	5,944
6	Michael Lowe	Australia	5,824
7	Kieren Perrow	Australia	5,690
8	Daniel Wills	Australia	5,674
9	Kelly Slater	United States	5,576
10	Mark Occhilupo	Australia	5,564

== Women's World Tour ==
=== Tournaments ===
Date	Location	Country	Event	Winner	Runner-up	Ref
March 18-March 24	Gold Coast	Australia	Roxy Pro Gold Coast	Lynette MacKenzie (AUS)	Jacqueline Silva (BRA)	Report
April 27-May 4	Tavarua	Fiji	Roxy Pro Fiji	Melanie Redman-Carr (AUS)	Heather Clark (RSA)	Report
May 7-May 18	Teahupoo, Tahiti	French Polynesia	Billabong Pro Tahiti	Keala Kennelly (HAW)	Layne Beachley (AUS)	Report
September 17-September 24	Figueira Da Foz	Portugal	Figueira Pro	Megan Abubo (HAW)	Samantha Cornish (AUS)	Report
September 26-October 8	South West Coast	France	Roxy Pro	Layne Beachley (AUS)	Sofia Mulanovich (PER)	Report
December 8-December 20	Honolua Bay, Hawaii	United States	Billabong Pro	Jacqueline Silva (BRA)	Pauline Menczer (AUS)	Report

=== Final standings ===
Rank	Name	Country	Points
1	Layne Beachley	Australia	3,200
2	Jacqueline Silva	Brazil	2,870
3	Melanie Redman-Carr	Australia	2,860
4	Keala Kennelly	Hawaii	2,690
5	Lynette MacKenzie	Australia	2,680
6	Heather Clark	South Africa	2,500
7	Rochelle Ballard	Hawaii	2,490
8	Chelsea Georgeson	Australia	2,470
9	Megan Abubo	Hawaii	2,200
10	Samantha Cornish	Australia	2,170
