= 2004 ASP World Tour =

Professional surfing league season

The 2004 ASP World Tour is a professional competitive surfing league. It is run by the Association of Surfing Professionals.

== Men's World Tour ==
=== Tournaments ===
Date	Location	Country	Event	Winner	Runner-up	Ref
March 2-March 14	Gold Coast	Australia	Quiksilver Pro	Michael Lowe (AUS)	Andy Irons (HAW)	Report
April 6-April 16	Bells Beach	Australia	Rip Curl Pro	Joel Parkinson (AUS)	Taj Burrow (AUS)	Report
May 6-May 18	Teahupoo, Tahiti	French Polynesia	Billabong Pro	C.J. Hobgood (USA)	Nathan Hedge (AUS)	Report
May 26-June 4	Tavarua	Fiji	Quiksilver Pro Fiji	Damien Hobgood (USA)	Andy Irons (HAW)	Report
July 13-July 23	Jeffreys Bay	South Africa	Billabong Pro	Andy Irons (HAW)	Nathan Hedge (AUS)	Report
September 1-September 8	Chiba	Japan	Quiksilver Pro	C.J. Hobgood (USA)	Joel Parkinson (AUS)	Report
September 10-September 21	Trestles	United States	Boost Mobile Pro	Joel Parkinson (AUS)	Kelly Slater (USA)	Report
September 23-October 4	Hossegor	France	Quiksilver Pro	Andy Irons (HAW)	Bruce Irons (HAW)	Report
October 5-October 16	Mundaka	Spain	Billabong Pro	Luke Egan (AUS)	Phillip MacDonald (AUS)	Report
November 1-November 10	Florianópolis	Brazil	Nova Schin Festival	Taj Burrow (AUS)	Tom Whitaker (AUS)	Report
December 8-December 20	Pipeline, Hawaii	United States	Rip Curl Pipeline Masters	Jamie O'Brien (HAW)	Sunny Garcia (HAW)	Report

=== Final standings ===
Rank	Name	Country	Points
1	Andy Irons	Hawaii	7,824
2	Joel Parkinson	Australia	6,588
3	Kelly Slater	United States	6,444
4	C.J. Hobgood	United States	6,108
5	Luke Egan	Australia	5,760
6	Taj Burrow	Australia	5,724
7	Nathan Hedge	Australia	5,688
8	Sunny Garcia	Hawaii	5,172
9	Damien Hobgood	United States	5,124
10	Peterson Rosa	Brazil	5,076

== Women's World Tour ==
=== Tournaments ===
Date	Location	Country	Event	Winner	Runner-up	Ref
March 2-March 14	Gold Coast	Australia	Roxy Pro Gold Coast	Jacqueline Silva (BRA)	Rochelle Ballard (HAW)	Report
April 18-April 24	Tavarua	Fiji	Roxy Pro Fiji	Sofía Mulánovich (PER)	Rochelle Ballard (HAW)	Report
May 6-May 16	Teahupoo, Tahiti	French Polynesia	Billabong Pro Tahiti	Sofía Mulánovich (PER)	Rochelle Ballard (HAW)	Report
May 22-May 30	Anglet	France	Roxy Jam	Sofía Mulánovich (PER)	Keala Kennelly (HAW)	Report
October 2-October 10	Malibu	United States	Rip Curl Malibu Pro	Megan Abubo (HAW)	Maria Tita Tavares (BRA)	Report
November 12-November 24	Haleiwa, Hawaii	United States	Roxy Pro	Layne Beachley (AUS)	Sofía Mulánovich (PER)	Report
December 8-December 19	Honolua Bay, Hawaii	United States	Billabong Pro	Chelsea Georgeson (AUS)	Samantha Cornish (AUS)	Report

=== Final standings ===
Rank	Name	Country	Points
1	Sofía Mulánovich	Peru	5,484
2	Rochelle Ballard	Hawaii	4,584
3	Chelsea Georgeson	Australia	4,572
4	Layne Beachley	Australia	4,368
5	Maria Tita Tavares	Brazil	3,846
6	Jacqueline Silva	Brazil	3,768
7	Keala Kennelly	Hawaii	3,348
8	Laurina McGrath	Australia	3,336
9	Megan Abubo	Hawaii	3,078
10	Samantha Cornish	Australia	2,964
