= 2000 ASP World Tour =

Professional surfing league season

The ASP World Tour is a professional competitive surfing league. It is run by the Association of Surfing Professionals.

== Men's World Tour ==
=== Tournaments ===
Date	Location	Country	Event	Winner	Runner-up	Ref
March 9-March 19	Gold Coast	Australia	Billabong Pro	Sunny Garcia (HAW)	Jake Paterson (AUS)	Report
April 18-April 28	Bells Beach	Australia	Rip Curl Pro	Sunny Garcia (HAW)	Flávio Padaratz (BRA)	Report
May 9-May 18	Teahupoo, Tahiti	French Polynesia	Gotcha Pro Tahiti	Kelly Slater (USA)	Shane Dorian (HAW)	Report
May 23-June 2	Tavarua	Fiji	Quiksilver Pro	Luke Egan (AUS)	Guilherme Herdy (BRA)	Report
June 28-July 9	Jeffreys Bay	South Africa	Billabong Pro	Jake Paterson (AUS)	Peterson Rosa (BRA)	Report
July 19-July 23	Huntington Beach	United States	Bluetorch Pro	Michael Campbell (AUS)	Sunny Garcia (HAW)	Report
August 15-August 21	Lacanau	France	T & C Lacanau Pro	Rob Machado (USA)	Armando Daltro (BRA)	Report
August 22-August 28	Hossegor	France	Rip Curl Pro	C.J. Hobgood (USA)	Luke Egan (AUS)	Report
August 30-September 9	Mundaka	Spain	Billabong Pro	Shane Dorian (HAW)	Mark Occhilupo (AUS)	Report
September 12-September 17	Figueira Da Foz	Portugal	Figueira Pro	Rob Machado (USA)	Taj Burrow (AUS)	Report
September 26-September 30	Trestles	United States	Billabong Pro	Andy Irons (HAW)	Jake Paterson (AUS)	Report
October 18-October 22	Rio de Janeiro	Brazil	Rio Surf International	Kalani Robb (HAW)	Taj Burrow (AUS)	Report
December 8-December 21	Pipeline, Hawaii	United States	Mountain Dew Pipeline Masters	Rob Machado (USA)	Michael Lowe (AUS)	Report

=== Final standings ===
Rank	Name	Country	Points
1	Sunny Garcia	Hawaii	7,270
2	Luke Egan	Australia	6,300
3	Rob Machado	United States	6,210
4	Shane Dorian	Hawaii	6,090
5	Jake Paterson	Australia	6,050
6	Taj Burrow	Australia	5,790
7	C.J. Hobgood	United States	5,660
8	Michael Campbell	Australia	5,630
9	Kalani Robb	Hawaii	5,540
10	Flávio Padaratz	Brazil	5,510

== Women's World Tour ==
=== Tournaments ===
Date	Location	Country	Event	Winner	Runner-up	Ref
March 9-March 19	Gold Coast	Australia	Billabong Pro	Layne Beachley (AUS)	Lisa Andersen (USA)	Report
April 18-April 24	Bells Beach	Australia	Sunsmart Classic	Megan Abubo (HAW)	Rochelle Ballard (HAW)	Report
May 9-May 18	Teahupoo, Tahiti	French Polynesia	Gallaz Women's Pro	Keala Kennelly (HAW)	Serena Brooke (AUS)	Report
June 28-July 9	Jeffreys Bay	South Africa	Billabong/MSF Pro	Megan Abubo (HAW)	Trudy Todd (AUS)	Report
July 19-July 23	Huntington Beach	United States	Elleven Pro Women's	Layne Beachley (AUS)	Melanie Redman-Carr (AUS)	Report
August 22-August 28	Hossegor	France	Rip Curl Pro	Layne Beachley (AUS)	Serena Brooke (AUS)	Report
August 30-September 9	Anglet	France	Billabong Pro	Lisa Andersen (AUS)	Layne Beachley (AUS)	Report
November 6	Honolua Bay, Hawaii	United States	Billabong Girls Pro	Neridah Falconer (AUS)	Kate Skarratt (AUS)	Report
November 24-December 7	Sunset Beach, Hawaii	United States	Quiksilver Roxy Pro	Layne Beachley (AUS)	Keala Kennelly (HAW)	Report

=== Final standings ===
Rank	Name	Country	Points
1	Layne Beachley	Australia	5,730
2	Megan Abubo	Hawaii	4,310
3	Serena Brooke	Australia	3,770
4	Maria Tita Tavares	Brazil	3,740
5	Lisa Andersen	United States	3,730
6	Melanie Redman-Carr	Australia	3,645
7	Heather Clark	South Africa	3,570
8	Keala Kennelly	Hawaii	3,410
9	Rochelle Ballard	Hawaii	3,325
10	Kate Skarratt	Australia	3,260
