= Billabong Pro Teahupoo =

Professional surfing competition

- Sport: Surfing
- Country: French Polynesia
- Most recent champions: (Hawaii) Seth Moniz (men) (Canada) Erin Brooks (women)
- Most titles: (United States) Kelly Slater (men) (5 titles) (Hawaii) Keala Kennelly (women) (3 titles)

Billabong Pro Teahupoo is a professional surfing competition of the World Surf League held at the break Teahupo'o in Taiarapu, Tahiti. The Billabong Pro Teahupoo was founded in 1999 and has been recognized as "one of the world's heaviest big wave competitions".

== Billabong Pro Teahupoo location ==
The surfing event takes place in Teahupo’o, a village on the south-west coast of the island of Tahiti, French Polynesia, southern Pacific Ocean. Teahupo'o is a reef break. The swells that hit the reef mainly break left, but the outer reef also creates right breaks that surfers must be cautious of when paddling out. Therefore, Teahupo'o is also "renowned for the consistent number of barrels it delivers". However, "only experienced surfers in peak physical condition should attempt Teahupo'o". The breaks heavy waves combined with a shallow shoreline can result in serious injuries and even death in a wipeout.

== Billabong Pro Teahupoo wave break ==
The Billabong Pro Teahupo'o's reputation for wave riding is due partly to its unique form. An extremely shallow coral reef which ranges up to 20 inches beneath the waters surface is responsible for a very hollow-breaking wave. The wave's unique shape, with an effect of almost breaking below sea level, is due to the specific shape of the reef beneath the wave. Its semi circular nature which drops down sharply creates a 'below water' effect and the extreme angles in descent create an instant instability to the wave. A steep wall of reef causes the entire mass to fold onto a scalloped semi circle breaking arc. The wave bends and races along into a dry reef closeout and the lip of the wave is often as thick as it is tall. Combined, these unique properties have earned Teahupo’o the reputation as one of the most dangerous surf breaks in the world.

== Billabong Pro Teahupoo competition ==
The ASP Billabong Pro Teahupo’o consists of four parts based an elimination process. The first is composed of the competitive heats. The second is composed of the Quarter Finals. The third is composed of the Semi Finals. The fourth and last part of the competition is the Finals. Once this process of the Billabong Pro Teahupoo competition is completed, then a Billabong Pro Teahupoo Champion is named.

== Naming ==
Since the birth of this competition it had different names due to sponsorship deals.

Name	Years
Gotcha Tahiti Pro	1999–2000
Billabong Pro Teahupoo	2001–2017
Tahiti Pro Teahupo'o	2018–2019
Outerknown Tahiti Pro	2022
SHISEIDO Tahiti Pro	2023–present

== Winners ==
The Billabong Pro Teahupoo event names a new champion each year. The past champions of the listed WSL competition are located below.

=== Men's ===
Year	Winner	Nation	Score	Runner-Up	Nation	Score	Prizemoney
1999	Mark Occhilupo	Australia	14.50	CJ Hobgood	United States	9.50	$120,600
2000	Kelly Slater	United States	25.55	Shane Dorian	United States	20.25	$135,600
2001	Cory Lopez	United States	25.05	CJ Hobgood	United States	23.85	$250,000
2002	Andy Irons	Hawaii	22.65	Luke Egan	Australia	20.50	$250,000
2003	Kelly Slater (2)	United States	19.57	Taj Burrow	Australia	14.83	$250,000
2004	CJ Hobgood	United States	16.66	Nathan Hedge	Australia	8.67	$260,000
2005	Kelly Slater (3)	United States	20.00	Damien Hobgood	United States	17.5	$270,000
2006	Bobby Martinez	United States	16.27	Fred Patacchia	Hawaii	16.07	$280,000
2007	Damien Hobgood	United States	16.60	Mick Fanning	Australia	16.20	$300,000
2008	Bruno Santos	Brazil	9.16	Manoa Drollet	French Polynesia	6.83	$320,000
2009	Bobby Martinez (2)	United States	18.46	Taj Burrow	Australia	16.10	$340,000
2010	Andy Irons (2)	Hawaii	14.67	CJ Hobgood	United States	8.33	$400,000
2011	Kelly Slater (4)	United States	18.43	Owen Wright	Australia	17.10	$425,000
2012	Mick Fanning	Australia	18.87	Joel Parkinson	Australia	18.37	$425,000
2013	Adrian Buchan	Australia	18.94	Kelly Slater	United States	17.90	$425,000
2014	Gabriel Medina	Brazil	18.96	Kelly Slater	United States	18.93	$500,000
2015	Jeremy Flores	France	16.87	Gabriel Medina	Brazil	13.20	
2016	Kelly Slater (5)	United States	19.67	John John Florence	Hawaii	15.23	
2017	Julian Wilson	Australia	18.96	Gabriel Medina	Brazil	17.87	
2018	Gabriel Medina (2)	Brazil	13.50	Owen Wright	Australia	12.07	
2019	Owen Wright	Australia	17.07	Gabriel Medina	Brazil	14.93	$607,800
2022	Miguel Pupo	Brazil	17.17	Kauli Vaast	France	15.00	
2023	Jack Robinson	Australia	15.66	Gabriel Medina	Brazil	15.00	
2024	Ítalo Ferreira	Brazil	17.70	John John Florence	Hawaii	17.16	
2025	Jack Robinson (2)	Australia	16.90	Griffin Colapinto	United States	13.67	
2026	Seth Moniz	Hawaii	18.17	Griffin Colapinto	United States	14.67	

=== Women's ===
Year	Winner	Nation	Score	Runner-Up	Nation	Score
1999	Kate Skarratt	Australia	21.50	Melanie Redman-Carr	Australia	16.45
2000	Keala Kennelly	Hawaii	12.90	Serena Brooke	Australia	8.45
2001	Layne Beachley	Australia	16.75	Rochelle Ballard	Hawaii	12.90
2002	Keala Kennelly (2)	Hawaii	22.90	Layne Beachley	Australia	11.60
2003	Keala Kennelly (3)	Hawaii	9.83	Rochelle Ballard	Hawaii	7.84
2004	Sofía Mulánovich	Peru	14.23	Rochelle Ballard	Hawaii	13.50
2005	Chelsea Hedges	Australia	14.00	Melanie Redman-Carr	Australia	10.50
2006	Melanie Redman-Carr	Australia	13.50	Chelsea Hedges	Australia	10.44
2022	Courtney Conlogue	United States	11.67	Brisa Hennessy	Costa Rica	5.20
2023	Caroline Marks	United States	9.23	Caitlin Simmers	United States	3.94
2024	Vahine Fierro	France	15.17	Brisa Hennessy	Costa Rica	12.00
2025	Molly Picklum	Australia	17.26	Caitlin Simmers	United States	4.94
2026	Erin Brooks	Canada	17.20	Anat Lelior	Israel	16.33

16. Billabong Pro Tahiti. (2013). ASP World Tour – The Association of Surfing Professionals.

17. Steve Robertson and Kim Kempton. Celebrating perfect 10’s at Billabong Pro Teahupoo. (2010). http://www.surfersvillage.com/surfing-news/48143#.Ucz9vuDraFI

18. Billabong Pro Teahupoo. (2012). http://www.redbull.com/cs/Satellite/en_INT/Event/Billabong-Pro-Teahupoo-021242894680885
