= Fiji Pro =

Surfing competition in Fiji

- Most recent season or competition: Fiji Pro 2017
- Sport: Surfing
- Country: Fiji
- Most recent champions: (United States) Cole Houshmand (men) (Canada) Erin Brooks (women)
- Most titles: (United States) Kelly Slater, 4 titles (men) (Australia) Melanie Redman-Carr, (Peru) Sofía Mulánovich, (Australia) Sally Fitzgibbons, (Canada) Erin Brooks 2 titles (women)
- Website: Official website

The Fiji Pro was an event on the WSL Championship Tour. The event was held at Namotu in Tavarua, Fiji, and ran from 1999 to 2008, and then was resurrected in 2012. The competition was cancelled in 2018 due to lack of a sponsor.

== Naming ==
Since the birth of this competition it had different names. From 2013 to 2016 it was sponsored by Volcom. In 2017 it was sponsored by Outerknown.

== Results ==
=== Men's ===
Men's
Year	Winner	Nation	Score	Runner-Up	Nation	Score
2026	Cole Houshmand	United States	16.87	Gabriel Medina	Brazil	15.17
2024	Griffin Colapinto	United States	12.80	Rio Waida	Indonesia	10.17
2017	Matt Wilkinson	Australia	16.60	Connor O'Leary	Australia	15.70
2016	Gabriel Medina (2)	Brazil	15.60	Matt Wilkinson	Australia	6.34
2015	Owen Wright	Australia	20.00	Julian Wilson	Australia	7.84
2014	Gabriel Medina	Brazil	18.40	Nat Young	United States	14.77
2013	Kelly Slater (4)	United States	19.80	Mick Fanning	Australia	15.87
2012	Kelly Slater (3)	United States	18.16	Gabriel Medina	Brazil	10.87
2008	Kelly Slater (2)	United States	19.27	C. J. Hobgood	United States	16.67
2006	Damien Hobgood (2)	United States	15.40	Shaun Cansdell	Australia	10.50
2005	Kelly Slater	United States	19.33	C. J. Hobgood	United States	15.16
2004	Damien Hobgood	United States	19.90	Andy Irons	Hawaii	18.96
2003	Andy Irons	Hawaii	19.00	Cory Lopez	United States	13.83
2002	Michael Lowe	Australia	25.70	Shea Lopez	United States	23.05
2000	Luke Egan	Australia	19.15	Guilherme Herdy	Brazil	18.00
1999	Mark Occhilupo	Australia	20.25	Victor Ribas	Brazil	17.80

=== Women's ===
Women's
Year	Winner	Nation	Score	Runner-Up	Nation	Score
2026	Erin Brooks	Canada	-	Isabella Nichols	Australia	-
2024	Erin Brooks	Canada	15.10	Tatiana Weston-Webb	Brazil	12.33
2017	Courtney Conlogue	United States	8.74	Tatiana Weston-Webb	Brazil	5.53
2016	Johanne Defay	France	17.10	Carissa Moore	Hawaii	10.70
2015	Sally Fitzgibbons (2)	Australia	18.56	Bianca Buitendag	South Africa	14.40
2014	Sally Fitzgibbons	Australia	9.00	Stephanie Gilmore	Australia	8.73
2006	Melanie Redman-Carr (2)	Australia		Layne Beachley	Australia	
2005	Sofía Mulánovich (2)	Peru		Layne Beachley	Australia	
2004	Sofía Mulánovich	Peru		Rochelle Ballard	Hawaii	
2003	Keala Kennelly	Hawaii		Heather Clark	South Africa	
2002	Melanie Redman-Carr	Australia		Heather Clark	South Africa	
2001	Megan Abubo	Hawaii		Melanie Redman-Carr	Australia	

== See also ==
- Roxy Pro Gold Coast
- Quiksilver Pro France
- Quiksilver
- Roxy
