= Andy Irons =

American surfer (1978–2010)

Personal information
- Born: Philip Andrew Irons; July 24, 1978 Lihue, Hawaii, U.S.
- Died: November 2, 2010 (aged 32) Grapevine, Texas, U.S.
- Years active: 10 years
- Height: 6 ft 0.5 in (1.84 m)
- Weight: 170 lb (77 kg)

Surfing career
- Sport: Surfing
- Best year: Ranked 1st on the ASP World Tour (2002, 2003, 2004)
- Career earnings: $1,495,533
- Sponsors: Billabong, Von Zipper, Nixon Watches, Kustom Footwear, Dakine, Tamba
- Major achievements: 3x World Champion (2002, 2003, 2004); 4x Triple Crown of Surfing Champion (2002, 2003, 2006, 2005); 1998 Junior World Surfing Champion; 2x US Open of Surfing champion (1998, 2005); WSL Championship Tour event wins: 20; Surfers' Hall of Fame inductee

Surfing specifications
- Stance: Regular (natural foot)

Philip Andrew Irons (July 24, 1978 – November 2, 2010) was an American professional surfer. He began surfing with his brother Bruce on the shallow and dangerous waves of Kauai, Hawaii, before being spotted by a local surfboard brand and flown to North Shore, Oahu, Hawaii, to compete and develop his skill.

Over the course of his professional career, Irons won three world titles (2002, 2003, 2004), three Quiksilver Pro France titles (2003, 2004, 2005), two Rip Curl Pro Search titles (2006 and 2007), and 20 elite-tour victories, including the Vans Triple Crown of Surfing four times from 2002 to 2006. He won at nearly every venue on the ASP calendar, only missing Gold Coast, Brazil, and Portugal.

== Career ==
His younger brother Bruce Irons is a former competitor on the World Championship Tour of Surfing. During his childhood, Andy regularly lost to Bruce in contests, but that changed once he entered the World Championship Tour. During his professional career, he won three world titles (2002, 2003, 2004), three Quiksilver Pro France titles (2003, 2004, 2005), two Rip Curl Pro Search titles (2006 and 2007) and 20 elite-tour victories, including the Vans Triple Crown of Surfing four times from 2002 to 2006. On September 3, 2010, he won the Billabong Pro Teahupoo in Tahiti.

In 2009, Irons withdrew from doing the full ASP World Tour season for personal reasons, though he did participate in a few events. He requested a wildcard entry for the 2010 ASP World Tour season, which was granted by ASP president Wayne Bartholomew. As a result, Irons did not have to re-qualify in 2010 via the World Qualifying Series (WQS). Irons won the Billabong Pro Tahiti 2010.

He was inducted into the Surfing Walk of Fame in Huntington Beach, California, in 2008. The governor of Hawaii declared February 13 forever "Andy Irons Day".

Billabong produced an Andy Irons line of board shorts.

== Films ==
The 2018 movie Andy Irons: Kissed by God (directed by adventure-sport documentarians Steve and Todd Jones) is about the three-time world champion who died at 32 after a lifelong struggle with bipolar disorder and addiction. The film features in-depth interviews with Andy's brother Bruce Irons, his wife Lyndie Irons, Joel Parkinson, Nathan Fletcher, Sunny Garcia, and Kelly Slater.

In 2009, Irons Brothers Productions released A fly in the champagne, a documentary of the rivalry that arose between Irons and Slater in the early 2000s. The movie ends with a trip to Indonesia Kelly Slater and Andy Irons went on together.

The 2005 movie Blue Horizon (directed by surfing filmmaker Jack McCoy) paralleled his life on the WCT tour with that of free surfer David Rastovich. The film also touched on his long-time rivalry with 11-time world champion Kelly Slater. Although the film was created in a documentary-like style, there has been some debate over whether or not the film offered an accurate and fair portrayal of Irons's surfing lifestyle.

In addition to Blue Horizon, Irons was also a subject of many other surf films, including his screen appearance in Trilogy, which starred himself, Joel Parkinson, and Taj Burrow.

== Rivalry with Kelly Slater ==
Irons had a much-publicized, and, according to him, overhyped, rivalry with fellow professional surfer Kelly Slater. In an interview, Irons said:

For me, just being affiliated with Kelly--to be next to him--I mean, that's awesome. He's the ultimate surfer. He's the best surfer in the world. Ever. Best competitive, best free surfer, you name it, and to have my name put next to his everywhere really is flattering. He's the Michael Jordan of our sport. Kelly knows how I feel about him. Despite all the media hype that comes out of a rivalry there's a lot of respect given both ways. People don't realize there are times when we hang out. We'll go check the waves together. We talk about boards. He invited me personally to his contest on Tavarua. There's a ton of respect there.

Slater himself was quoted in a Surfer Magazine tribute for Irons:

Andy was an absolutely gifted individual. I'm lucky to have known him and had the times we had together. I feel blessed that we worked through the differences we had and I was able to learn what I'm made of because of Andy. I got to know a happy, funny, innocent kid who was happy to live every second with the people he loved. I'm so sad. My thoughts are with Bruce and Lyndie and their parents and all of his many friends around the world. It's a huge and far too premature loss for all of us. He was the most intense competitor I've ever known and one of the most sensitive people. He had so much life left in him and it hurts to think about. We look forward to his memory living on with our memories of him and his child on the way. There are a lot of uncles awaiting his arrival. I really miss Andy. He had a really good heart.

== Career victories ==
=== Victories ===
WCT Wins
Year	Event	Venue	Country
2010	Billabong Pro Teahupoo	Teahupo'o, Tahiti	French Polynesia
2007	Rip Curl Search	Arica, Ex Isla Alacran	Chile
2006	Rip Curl Pipeline Masters	Banzai Pipeline, Oahu	United States
2006	Rip Curl Search	Barra de la Cruz, Oaxaca	Mexico
2005	Rip Curl Pipeline Masters	Banzai Pipeline, Oahu	United States
2005	Quiksilver Pro France	Hossegor, Nouvelle-Aquitaine	France
2005	Japan Quiksilver Pro	Chiba , Kantō	Japan
2004	Quiksilver Pro France	Hossegor, Nouvelle-Aquitaine	France
2004	Billabong Pro J-Bay	Jeffreys Bay, Eastern Cap	South Africa
2003	Xbox Pipeline Masters	Banzai Pipeline, Oahu	United States
2003	Quiksilver Pro France	Hossegor, Nouvelle-Aquitaine	France
2003	Niijima Quiksilver Pro	Niijima Island, Tokyo	Japan
2003	Quiksilver Pro Tavarua	Namotu, Tavarua	Fiji
2003	Rip Curl Pro Bells Beach	Bells Beach, Victoria	Australia
2002	Xbox Pipeline Masters	Banzai Pipeline, Oahu	United States
2002	Billabong Pro Mundaka	Mundaka, Basque Country	Spain
2002	Billabong Pro Teahupoo	Teahupo'o, Tahiti	French Polynesia
2002	Rip Curl Pro Bells Beach	Bells Beach, Victoria	Australia
2000	Billabong Pro	Lower Trestles, California	United States
1998	Op Pro	Huntington Beach, California	United States
World Qualifying Series
Year	Event	Venue	Country
2006	Op Pro Hawaii	Haleiwa, Oahu	United States
2005	US Open of Surfing	Huntington Beach, California	United States
2004	O'Neill World Cup of Surfing	Sunset Beach, Oahu	United States
2004	Mr Price Pro	North Beach, Durban	South Africa
2004	Body Glove Surfabout	Lower Trestles, California	United States
2001	G-Shock Hawaiian Pro	Haleiwa, Oahu	United States
2001	Rip Curl Pro	St. Newport Beach, California	United States
1998	G-Shock US Open/Clarion	Huntington Beach, California	United States
1997	Hcel Pro	Sunset Beach, Oahu	United States
1997	Black Pearl Horue Pro Surfing	Teahupo'o, Tahiti	French Polynesia
1996	Red Dog Summer Pro	South Shore, Oahu	United States
1996	HIC Pipeline Pro	Banzai Pipeline, Oahu	United States

== Personal life ==
Irons married Lyndie Dupuis on November 25, 2007, in Princeville, Kauai. She was seven months pregnant with their first child at the time of his death. Lyndie gave birth to their son, Andy Axel Irons, in Kauai on the opening day of the Pipeline Masters in Memory of Andy Irons on December 8, 2010. Lyndie and Axel continue to live on Kauai, where she and Andy shared a home.

== Death ==
Irons died on November 2, 2010. He was found by two hotel staff lying in bed on his back with the sheets pulled up to his chin after he had failed to respond to knocks on the door and they went in to investigate.

The Tarrant County Medical Examiner's Office concludes that Irons died from a cardiac arrest due to a severe blockage of a main artery of the heart. The official autopsy report lists also a second cause of death as "acute mixed drug ingestion", listing alprazolam, methadone, benzoylecgonine (a metabolite of cocaine), and traces of methamphetamine as the drugs found in Andy's body at the time of his death. Initial press releases cited Dengue fever as the cause of Irons's death; however, the autopsy report conducted by the Tarrant County Medical Examiner's office were negative for Dengue and other flavivirus. It is unclear why rumors that Dengue fever contributed to Irons's death proliferated.

In response to Irons's death, a World Championship Tour event in Puerto Rico was postponed for two days with competitors holding a "paddle out" memorial service for Irons. Irons had withdrawn from the event citing ill health and was flying back to his home in Hawaii during a stopover in Grapevine, Texas, near Dallas-Fort Worth International Airport. He had reportedly stopped in Miami after leaving Puerto Rico, and early reports said he was put on a saline drip. He was reported to have been vomiting on the Hawaii-bound plane before being removed prior to takeoff. In the days immediately following his death, it was reported that in Dallas, an extremely ill Irons had attempted to board his connecting flight to Honolulu at 11:30 a.m. but was turned away at an American Airlines gate—a claim the company denies.

A memorial service was held November 14, 2010, in Hanalei Bay, Kauai. His wife, Lyndie, and brother, Bruce, scattered his ashes outside Hanalei Bay, where thousands of family, friends, and admirers said their last goodbyes.

Friend and rival surfer Kelly Slater dedicated his November 6, 2010, victory to Irons. "I just want to send my condolences to Andy's family," Slater said:

"I'm a little overwhelmed right now, but I want to dedicate this to Andy ... It's like exact opposites. This doesn't really offset that, I'd give this title away in a second if Andy could come back."

Slater also wrote a candid remembrance honoring the life of Andy Irons on the anniversary of his death; it was also the same day that Slater claimed his 11th ASP World Title in San Francisco.

== Legacy ==
A 2018 documentary titled Andy Irons: Kissed by God chronicled Irons's surfing career and his struggles with bipolar disorder and substance abuse.

Irons's family runs the Andy Irons Foundation in his memory which focuses on community programs for youth struggling with mental illness. In 2019, Metallica and Billabong released the "Metallica x AI Forever" collection, with a portion of the proceeds benefiting the Andy Irons Foundation. Irons had previously collaborated with Metallica and Billabong for a clothing collection in 2007.

== Filmography ==
- Pipe (2011)
- Still Filthy (2009)
- A Fly in the Champagne (2009)
- Trilogy (2007)
- A Fistful of Barrels (2006)
- Blue Horizon (2005)
- Campaign 2 (2005)
- Campaign (2003)
- Snapt 2: The Next Hit (2003)
- Snapt: The Movie (2002)
- Momentum: Under The Influence (2001)
- Raw Irons (1998)
- 5’5 x 19 1/4 (1997)
- Insanity (1995)

Achievements
Preceded by C. J. Hobgood	Association of Surfing Professionals World Champion (men's); 2002, 2003, & 2004	Succeeded by Kelly Slater
