= J-Bay Open =

Surfing event in Jeffreys Bay, South Africa

- Current season, competition or edition: Corona Open J-Bay 2023
- Sport: Surfing
- Country: South Africa
- Most recent champions: (Japan) Connor O'Leary (men) (Hawaii) Gabriela Bryan (women)
- Most titles: (United States) Kelly Slater and (Australia) Mick Fanning (men) (4 titles) (Brazil) Tatiana Weston-Webb (women) (1 title)
- Website: Hurley Pro Sunset Beach

J-Bay Open a.k.a. Billabong Pro Jeffreys Bay is an event on the World Surf League. The event is held every year at Jeffreys Bay in Eastern Cape, South Africa. Inaugural winner Kelly Slater, and Mick Fanning share the most victories with 4.

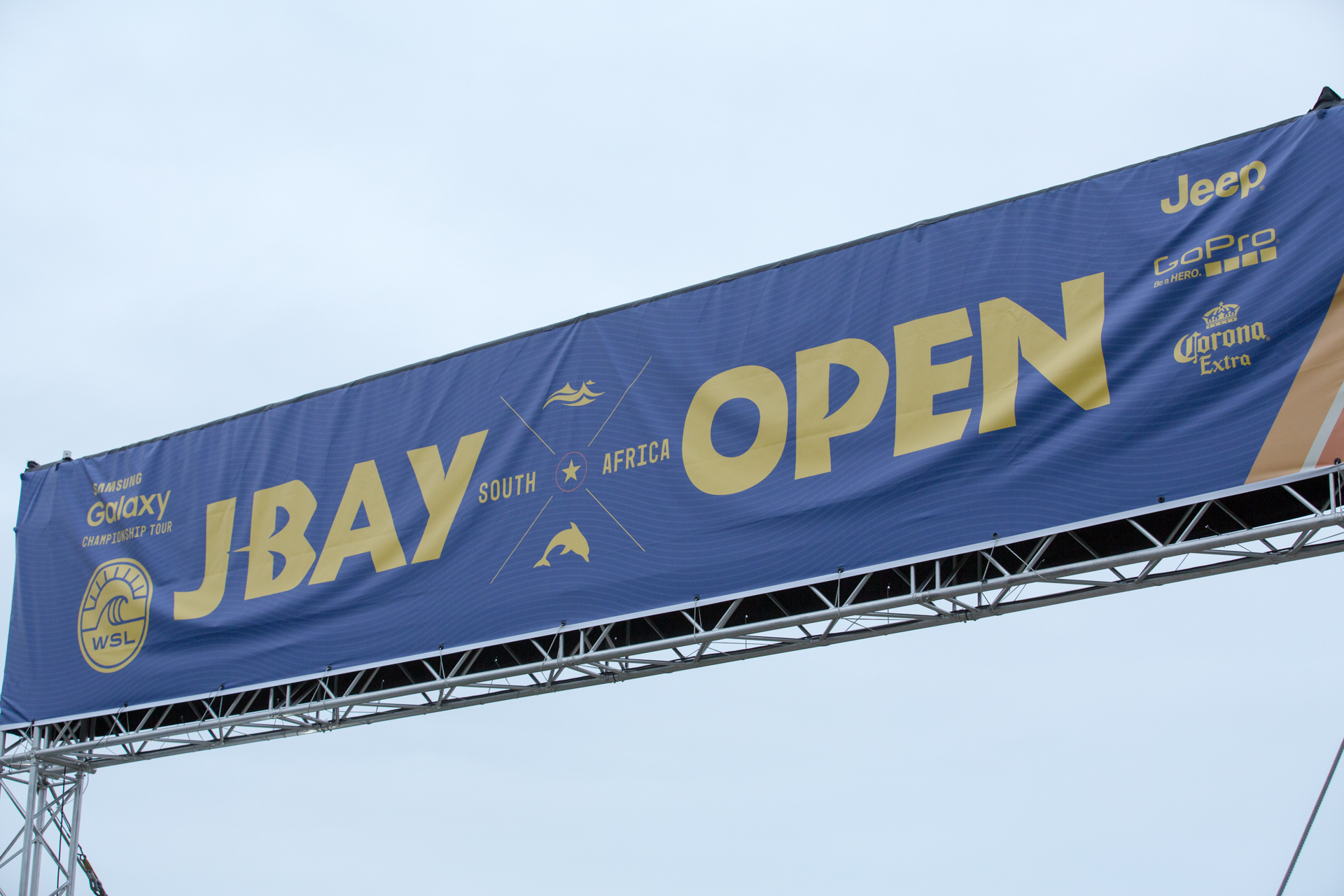

== Naming ==
Since the birth of this competition it had different names.

== Results ==
=== Men's ===
Year	Winner	Nation	Score	Runner-Up	Nation	Score	Prize money
1984	Mark Occhilupo	Australia	5.00	Hans Hedemann	Hawaii	0.00	
1996	Kelly Slater	United States	24.75	Taylor Knox	United States	22.25	$105,000
1998	Michael Barry	Australia	25.30	Sunny Garcia	Hawaii	19.75	$120,600
1999	Joel Parkinson	Australia	21.50	Ross Williams	Hawaii	17.45	$120,600
2000	Jake Paterson	Australia	23.50	Peterson Rosa	Brazil	15.50	$135,600
2001	Jake Paterson (2)	Australia	21.30	Taylor Knox	United States	20.50	$250,00
2002	Mick Fanning	Australia	27.70	Michael Lowe	Australia	21.60	$250,000
2003	Kelly Slater (2)	United States	18.36	Damien Hobgood	United States	15.83	$250,000
2004	Andy Irons	Hawaii	16.83	Nathan Hedge	Australia	8.00	$260,000
2005	Kelly Slater (3)	United States	16.83	Andy Irons	Hawaii	16.56	$270,000
2006	Mick Fanning (2)	Australia	16.90	Taj Burrow	Australia	16.00	$280,000
2007	Taj Burrow	Australia	16.50	Kelly Slater	United States	6.17	$300,000
2008	Kelly Slater (4)	United States	16.73	Mick Fanning	Australia	9.40	$320,000
2009	Joel Parkinson (2)	Australia	15.97	Damien Hobgood	United States	11.94	$340,000
2010	Jordy Smith	South Africa	17.93	Adam Melling	Australia	10.00	$400,000
2011	Jordy Smith (2)	South Africa	15.60	Mick Fanning	Australia	14.83	$425,000
2014	Mick Fanning (3)	Australia	17.00	Joel Parkinson	Australia	13.60	
2015	Shark	South Africa	20.00	Mick Fanning & Julian Wilson	Australia	0.00	
2016	Mick Fanning (4)	Australia	17.70	John John Florence	Hawaii	17.13	
2017	Filipe Toledo	Brazil	18.00	Frederico Morais	Portugal	17.73	
2018	Filipe Toledo (2)	Brazil	16.80	Wade Carmichael	Australia	15.33	
2019	Gabriel Medina	Brazil	19.50	Italo Ferreira	Brazil	16.77	
2022	Ethan Ewing	Australia	16.80	Jack Robinson	Australia	16.30	
2023	Filipe Toledo (3)	Brazil	18.76	Ethan Ewing	Australia	12.60	
2025	Connor O'Leary	Japan	15.67	Yago Dora	Brazil	14.23	

=== Women's ===
Year	Winner	Nation	Score	Runner-Up	Nation	Score
1996	Lisa Andersen	United States	28.25	Rochelle Ballard	Hawaii	20.25
1998	Trudy Todd	Australia	28.00	Lynette MacKenzie	Australia	17.25
1999	Melanie Redman-Carr	Australia	16.00	Lynette MacKenzie	Australia	14.10
2000	Megan Abubo	Hawaii	15.15	Trudy Todd	Australia	10.75
2018	Stephanie Gilmore	Australia	14.24	Lakey Peterson	United States	11.50
2019	Carissa Moore	Hawaii	15.47	Lakey Peterson	United States	14.60
2022	Tatiana Weston-Webb	Brazil	17.50	Tyler Wright	Australia	15.67
2023	Lakey Peterson	United States	14.77	Molly Picklum	Australia	13.50
2025	Gabriela Bryan	Hawaii	13.60	Molly Picklum	Australia	13.34
