= Layne Beachley =

Australian surfer

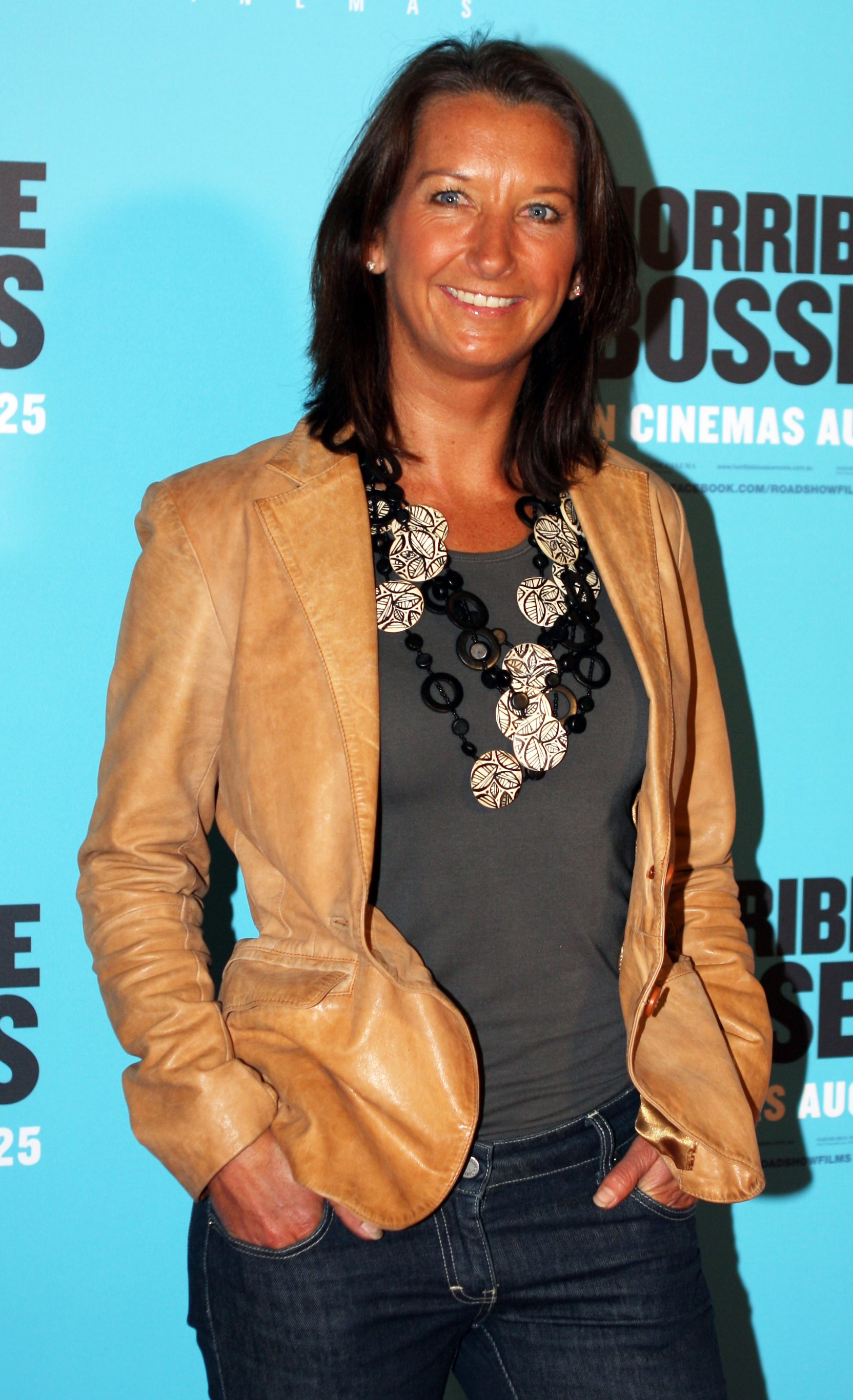
- Beachley in August 2011

Personal information
- Born: Tania Maris Gardner; 24 May 1972 (age 54) Manly, New South Wales, Australia
- Height: 1.65 m (5 ft 5 in)

Surfing career
- Sport: Surfing
- Major achievements: 7x World Champion 1998, 1999, 2000, 2001, 2002, 2003, 2006; 2005 Laureus World Alternative Sportsperson of the Year Award; 2003 Teen Choice Awards Extreme Female Athlete of the Year; Surfers' Hall of Fame (inducted 2006); Australian Sports Hall of Fame (inducted 2011); Officer of the Order of Australia (awarded 2015)

Surfing specifications
- Stance: Regular (natural foot)

Layne Collette Beachley AO (born 24 May 1972) is an Australian former professional surfer from Manly, New South Wales. She won the World Championship seven times. Currently she is the chair of Surfing Australia.

== Surfing career ==
Beachley was inducted into the Surfing Hall of Fame in Huntington Beach, California.

At the age of 16 Beachley became a professional surfer. By the age of 20 she was ranked sixth in the world. Beachley became the Women's ASP World Champion in 1998, and won the title again in 1999, 2000, 2001, 2002, 2003 and 2006. She is the first woman in history to win 7 World Championships, and only surfer, male or female to win six consecutive world titles. She shared the woman's record for most World Championships won with Stephanie Gilmore until Gilmore won her eighth title in 2022.

In 2004, Layne was given a wildcard entry into the Energy Australia Open held at Newcastle, one of the rare occasions a woman has competed in a men's surfing event.

In 2006, Layne was inducted into the Surfers' Hall of Fame.

Beachley announced on 10 October 2008 that she would retire due to her age.

ASP Women's World Tour Wins
Year	Event	Venue	Country
1993	Diet Coke Women's Classic	Narrabeen, New South Wales	Australia
1994	Quit Women's Classic	Bells Beach, Victoria	Australia
1995	Rip Curl Pro France	Hossegor	France
1996	Cleanwater Classic	Manly Beach, New South Wales	Australia
1996	Wahine/Airtouch Pro	Huntington Beach, California	United States
1996	Wahine Women's US Open of Surfing	Huntington Beach, California	United States
1996	OP Pro	Haleiwa	Hawaii
1996	Quiksilver Roxy Women's Pro	Sunset Beach	Hawaii
1997	Quiksilver Roxy Women's Pro	Sunset Beach	Hawaii
1998	Sunsmart Classic	Bells Beach, Victoria	Australia
1998	Diet Coke Surf Classic	Manly Beach, New South Wales	Australia
1998	Tokushima Pro	Tokushima	Japan
1998	Kahlua Open	Huntington Beach, California	United States
1998	Rip Curl Pro France	Hossegor	France
1999	Sunsmart Classic	Bells Beach, Victoria	Australia
1999	Diet Coke Surf Classic	Manly Beach, New South Wales	Australia
1999	Newquay Pro	Newquay	England
1999	Roxy Pro Sunset Beach	Sunset Beach	Hawaii
2000	Billabong Pro	Gold Coast, Queensland	Australia
2000	Elleven Pro Women's	Huntington Beach, California	United States
2000	Rip Curl Pro France	Hossegor	France
2000	Quiksilver Roxy Pro	Sunset Beach	Hawaii
2001	Billabong Pro Tahiti	Teahupoo, Tahiti	French Polynesia
2002	Roxy Pro France	South West Coast	France
2003	Roxy Pro Gold Coast	Gold Coast, Queensland	Australia
2004	Roxy Pro	Haleiwa	Hawaii
2006	Billabong Girls Pro	Itacare	Brazil

=== Film appearances ===
She has appeared in the movies Blue Crush (2002), Billabong Odyssey (2003), Step into Liquid (2003), and the 2001 documentary 7 Girls.

=== Television work ===
Beachley narrates the Seven Network factual series Beach Cops.

Beachley also voices the character "Surfer" in the episode called "The Beach" of Australian Children's Cartoon Bluey on the ABC Network.

== Personal life ==
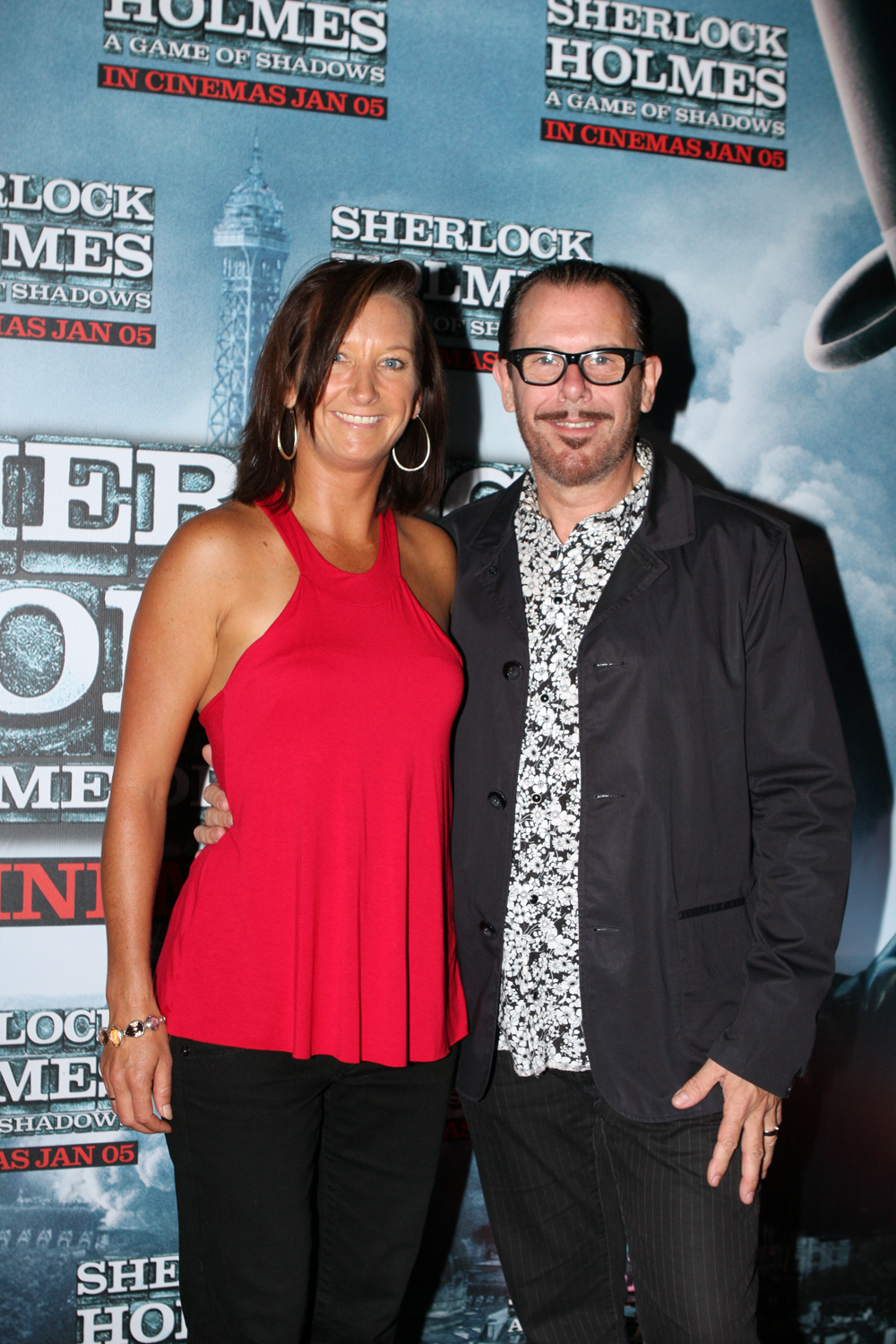
Beachley and her husband Kirk Pengilly at the Sydney premiere of Sherlock Holmes: A Game of Shadows, 2011.

Layne Beachley was born Tania Maris Gardner on 24 May 1972 in Sydney. Her mother was only 17 years old and unmarried so Layne was adopted by Neil and Valerie Beachley, who lived in nearby Manly. When Layne was only six years old, Valerie suffered a post-operative brain haemorrhage and died, leaving Layne and her brother to be raised by Neil. Beachley has spoken publicly about her personal struggles, including the fact that she was conceived during a date rape. In 1999, at the age of 27, she met her biological mother for the first time, who already had a nickname for her, "Beach".

Beachley was brought up in the competitive Manly surfing scene and was competing and winning against men at the age of 15. It was at that time that she developed her strength and style, contributing to her future success as an unbeaten world champion and big-wave rider. Beachley has supported a variety of local community causes, such as protesting sewage outfall and promoting sports.

She married Kirk Pengilly, a member of the Australian rock group INXS, in October 2010. Beachley first met Pengilly in 2002. They renewed their wedding vows in 2014 after Layne lost her wedding ring while surfing. She is stepmother to April, Pengilly's daughter from a previous relationship.

She is a keen supporter of the Manly Sea Eagles rugby league club.

== Recognition ==
Beachley received the Laureus World Alternative Sportsperson of the Year Award in 2004 and was named the Extreme Female Athlete of the Year as part of the Teen Choice Awards in 2005. She was inducted into both the Australian and US surfing halls of fame in 2006, and the Sport Australia Hall of Fame in 2011. In 2006, she was also inducted into the Surfing Walk of Fame as that year's Woman of the Year; the Walk is in Huntington Beach, California.

At the 2015 Australia Day Honours, Beachley was appointed an Officer of the Order of Australia for distinguished service to the community through support for a range of charitable organisations, as a mentor for women in sport, and to surfing as a world champion competitor. She was also awarded the Australian Sports Medal in 2000 for her back to back world titles in 1998 and 1999. In 2025, awarded The Dawn Award at Sport Australia Hall of Fame awards.

Sporting positions
Preceded by Lisa Anderson	World surfing champion (Women); 1998–2003	Succeeded by Sofia Mulanovich
Preceded by Chelsea Georgeson	World surfing champion (Women); 2006	Succeeded by Stephanie Gilmore
