= Bruce Irons (surfer) =

American surfer (born 1979)

Personal information
- Nickname: BI
- Born: November 16, 1979 (age 46) Hanalei, Kauai, Hawaii
- Years active: 1999–2008
- Height: 5 ft 11 in (180 cm)
- Weight: 165 lb (75 kg)
- Website: www.bruceirons.com

Surfing career
- Sport: Surfing
- Best year: 2008
- Sponsors: WEEDMAPS, DC Shoes
- Major achievements: 2008 Rip Curl Pro Search; 2004 Quiksilver in Memory of Eddie Aikau; 2001 Billabong Pipeline Masters: 2004 WSL Rookie of the Year

Surfing specifications
- Stance: Regular (natural foot)

Bruce Irons (born November 16, 1979) is an American regularfoot professional surfer from Hanalei, Kauai, and is often regarded as one of the best tuberiders of all time. He is the younger brother of three-time world champion Andy Irons.

== Background and early years ==
Born in Hanalei, Kauai, he was raised on the North Shore where he began surfing at age seven. After a successful amateur career with several wins in the United States Surfing Championships, he went pro shortly after graduating high school.

== Professional surfing career ==
After placing second in 1998 and third in 2000, he defeated eleven-time world champion Kelly Slater to win the 2001 Billabong Pipeline Masters event. On October 3, 2004, after qualifying for the World championship tour, he again defeated the seven-time champion in the semi-finals at the Association of Surfing Professionals Quiksilver Pro France event, but lost to his older brother Andy Irons in the final. Later, on December 15, 2004, he won the Quiksilver in Memory of Eddie Aikau event with a perfect score of 100, in waves that exceeded 40 feet (12m) at O'ahu's Waimea Bay. Soon after, he dazzled crowds by making the final and placing fourth in the Pipe Masters, barely re-qualifying for the 2005 tour.

On August 3, 2008, Irons defeated Freddy Patacchia to win the Rip Curl Pro Search 2008 held in Uluwatu, Bali, Indonesia. It was his first win on the ASP championship tour.

On November 21, 2012, Irons split with his longtime sponsor Volcom, where he'd been for nearly 20 years, helping shape the company's identity. On December 12, 2012, Irons signed a long-term deal with Fox Clothing. On November 30, 2015, Irons signed with RVCA after leaving Fox Clothing.

== Non-surfing credits ==
Included in Irons's product endorsements are:

- a signature pair of Oakley sunglasses
- life sponsorship by the skate, surf, and snowboard clothing line, Volcom
- one of three pro surfers, with Dane Reynolds and Ry Craike, supported by Power Balance
- together with his brother, Andy, sponsorship by skate shoe company DC
- wetsuit sponsor Body Glove International

In 2005, Irons starred in the Volcom funded autobiographical documentary film, entitled The Bruce Movie. The film was shot using 16mm, Super 8 and 35mm format and filmed on location in Hawaii, Indonesia, Australia, Tahiti, California, France and South Africa, and while popular in the surfing community, did not cut through to mainstream release. Irons was in the cast of the 2007 Australian documentary film about the Sydney surf gang, the Bra Boys, entitled Bra Boys: Blood is Thicker than Water. The film's official cast included eleven-time world champion, Kelly Slater, and surfing legends Mark Occhilupo, Irons, Laird Hamilton and approximately 40 other well known surfers.

== Video game appearances ==
Irons is a playable character in the video game Kelly Slater's Pro Surfer.

== Filmography ==
Acting

- Burning Man Dan 2 (2017)
- View from a Blue Moon (2015)
- Pipe (2011)
- Dude Cruse (2008)
- Blue Crush (2002)

Self

- Além da Visão (2020)
- White Rhino (2019)
- Red Bull Sports Events (2018)
- Andy Irons: Kissed by God (2018)
- Who is J.O.B (2016)
- Peaking (2016)
- Heavy Water (2015)
- Immersion the Movie (2012)
- Pacific Pirates (2011)
- Fiberglass and Megapixels (2010)
- Vans Triple Crown (2010)
- The Arena: North Short (2009)
- Archy: Build for Speed, Born to Ride (2008)
- Bra Boys (2007)
- Freddy P. Project: Interrogation (2006)
- Pipeline Masters Documentary (2006)
- The Kelly Slater Surf Invitational (2004)
- Blue Horizon (2004)
- Keep Your Eyes Open Documentary (2003)
- Wow (2002)
- Bluetorch TV (2001)
- Gondwana (2001)
- Hit & Run (2000)
