= Carol Philips =

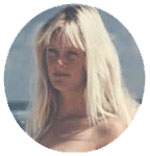
Carol Philips

Carol Philips (born 1966) is a pioneer of big-wave bodyboarding for women. She was the first woman to compete against the men at the Banzai Pipeline on the North Shore (Oʻahu). She founded the World Championship of Women's Bodyboarding in memory of Don and Josie Over in 1990. She was the first woman to hold a permit to run a contest at the Banzai Pipeline. Philips is the founder of the North Shore Surf Girls - Surf School.

Philips was featured in the book North Shore Chronicles and was in the film Blue Crush.

Philips was appointed in 2005 to a four-year term on the Hawaii State Commission on the Status of Women by the Governor of the State of Hawaii.

== Records ==
- Vice Champion, Morey World Championships, 1993
- United States Champion, Women’s Bodyboarding, 1989 and 1991
- Hawai'i State Champion, Women’s Bodyboarding, 1990 and 1999
