= Frederick Patacchia =

American professional surfer (born 1981)

Fredrick Patacchia Jr.
Personal information
- Born: December 15, 1981 (age 44) North Shore, Oahu, Hawaii
- Height: 5 ft 8 in (1.73 m)
- Weight: 165 lb (75 kg)
- Website: freddyp.com

Surfing career
- Sport: Surfing
- Best year: Ranked 12th on the ASP World Tour, 2008
- Career earnings: $963,950.00
- Sponsors: Quiksilver, Bud Light

Surfing specifications
- Stance: Goofy
- Shaper(s): Kerry Tokoro, Jason Kashiwai and Wes Oshiro
- Quiver: Mainly consists of Jason Kashiwai and Kerry Tokoro boards ranging from 6'0 to 9'8.
- Favorite waves: Haleiwa, Rocky Point and Pipeline
- Favorite maneuvers: Airs and barrels

Fredrick Patacchia Jr. (born December 15, 1981) is an American professional surfer. He retired from the World Surf League after a perfect 10 at the Hurley Pro at Lower Trestles on September 9, 2015.

Patacchia was raised on the North Shore of Oahu, Hawaii.

Patacchia began his elite tour campaign in 2005. In the same year he won the 2005 ASP Rookie of the Year award when he finished the season in 14th place.

His highest ASP World Tour rating was 12th in 2006 and 2008. 2015 marks his 11th season on tour.

His total career earnings are $931,250.

Patacchia is sponsored by Quiksilver and Bud Light.

He had a brief role in the movie Blue Crush as a local Hawaiian surfer.

In January 2011, he married Melissa Gomez and they have a daughter born December 2011.

== Rating history on the WSL Championship Tour ==
- 2015: 32nd
- 2014: 21st
- 2013: 19th
- 2012: 30th
- 2011: 24th
- 2010: 19th
- 2009: 15th
- 2008: 12th
- 2007: 23rd
- 2006: 17th
- 2005: 14th
