= Blue Crush =

2002 American sports film

- Theatrical release poster
- Directed by: John Stockwell
- Screenplay by: Lizzy Weiss; John Stockwell
- Story by: Lizzy Weiss
- Based on: "Life's Swell: The Maui Surfer Girls" by Susan Orlean
- Produced by: Brian Grazer
- Starring: Kate Bosworth; Michelle Rodriguez; Matthew Davis; Sanoe Lake; Mika Boorem
- Cinematography: David Hennings
- Edited by: Emma E. Hickox
- Music by: Paul Haslinger
- Production company: Imagine Entertainment
- Distributed by: Universal Pictures
- Release date: August 16, 2002
- Running time: 104 minutes
- Country: United States
- Language: English
- Budget: $30 million
- Box office: $55 million

Blue Crush is a 2002 American sports film directed by John Stockwell, written by Stockwell and Lizzy Weiss, and based on Susan Orlean's 1998 Outside magazine article "Life's Swell". Starring Kate Bosworth, Michelle Rodriguez, Matthew Davis, Sanoe Lake, and Mika Boorem, the film follows three friends, working at the hotel resort and surfing in Oahu, Hawaii. It also explores a female surfer preparing for the surfing competition and falling in love with a football player.

== Plot ==
Anne Marie, her fourteen-year-old sister Penny, and good friends Eden and Lena live in a small house on the North Shore. They all have been helping to raise Penny since her and Anne Marie's mother moved to Las Vegas with her boyfriend. While Penny is at school, Anne Marie, Eden, and Lena work as maids in a luxury resort hotel and surfing in their spare time. As a child, Anne Marie had been a rising star in women's surfing until a near-fatal wipeout left her with a paralyzing fear of powerful waves. Although she rises every morning before dawn to train for her surfing comeback, this fear continues to hamper her progress. Her friends, especially Eden, encourage her to overcome her trauma, conquer her fear of big waves, and become a professional surfer.

Anne Marie is invited to join the surfing competition at a famed North Shore surf spot, the challenging Banzai Pipeline. If she can do well enough to gain the attention of a sponsor, it can lift her and her friends out of the near-poverty in which they live. As the Pipeline competition gets closer, Anne Marie struggles to keep Penny from running wild and deal with family issues.

Anne Marie meets Matt Tollman, a National Football League quarterback who is in Hawaii for the Pro Bowl. He is instantly attracted to the surfer, especially after she boldly confronts another NFL Pro Bowler who had trashed his hotel room, leaving a mess for Anne Marie and her friends to clean. After a few encounters, Matt says that he wants to learn to surf, and Anne Marie agrees to teach him and several of his teammates to surf for $150 per hour, with Lena, Eden, and Penny acting as coaches. Anne Marie sees Matt again while getting the money from the hotel room, but a call comes for Matt from another woman. Anne Marie asks if it is Matt's wife, but he explains that it is his niece. Later, they sleep together.

Anne Marie's acceptance of an outsider as her boyfriend causes friction between her and some young male surfers on the North Shore. Eden points out to Anne Marie that her current interest in Matt has weakened her commitment to training for the Pipeline contest. Anne Marie also overhears demeaning comments about herself from some of the other football players' wives and girlfriends staying at the hotel.

Anne Marie confronts Matt about the situation and resolves to step up her game, fully committing herself to the Pipeline Masters. On the day of Pipeline, Anne Marie wipes out during her first attempt, but she advances after narrowly beating pro surfer Kate Skarratt. She is shaken, but Matt tells her how he failed in his first game as an NFL quarterback, which helps her regain her wavering confidence.

Determined, although still apprehensive, Anne Marie returns to surfing. Competing in the same set is Keala Kennelly, one of the first professional female surfers. While Keala surfs the first few sets of waves well, Anne Marie is still reluctant to try one, visions of her near-drowning incident holding her back. Keala finishes her turn and paddles back out to take Anne Marie under her wing. Keala encourages her to ride the best wave of the day, and Anne Marie does it perfectly, scoring a perfect ten. Although Anne Marie cannot advance to the next set, she regains her lost confidence and attracts the attention of sponsors, one of whom immediately offers to have her join the Billabong women's surf team.

== Cast ==
- Kate Bosworth as Anne Marie
- Michelle Rodriguez as Eden
- Matthew Davis as Matt
- Sanoe Lake as Lena
- Mika Boorem as Penny
- Faizon Love as Leslie

=== Appearances by notable surfers ===
- Keala Kennelly
- Carol Philips (as Carol Anne Philips)
- Coco Ho
- Rochelle Ballard
- Layne Beachley
- Megan Abubo
- Brian Keaulana
- Tom Carroll
- Jamie O'Brien
- Bruce Irons
- Makua Rothman
- Tamayo Perry

== Production ==
Blue Crush is the first film to use Hawaii's Act 221, a progressive local tax incentive that called for a 100 percent state tax credit for high-tech investments meeting the requirements for qualified high-tech business, while also allowing local investors to receive tax credits for investments in film or television productions. Universal Studios used the legislation for the Blue Crush production, receiving approximately $16 million in a deal with local investors who, in exchange, received the film's high-tech tax credits.

The agreement also involved marketing rights for the Hawaii Visitors and Convention Bureau, whereby the studio would cross-promote the film and the State of Hawaii. Entertainment executive April Masini, who helped produce Baywatch: Hawaii, Pacific Blue and the Miss Universe Pageant, brought the tax incentives to the attention of Universal Studios, and, along with producer Adam Fields, advised the state in its negotiation.

== Reception ==
=== Critical response ===
On the review aggregator website Rotten Tomatoes, 62% of 143 critics' reviews are positive, with an average rating of 5.8/10. The website's consensus reads: "The surfing sequences are exhilarating, but the plot is pretty forgettable and trite." Metacritic, which uses a weighted average, assigned the film a score of 61 out of 100, based on 33 critics, indicating "generally favorable" reviews.

Roger Ebert, in his review for the Chicago Sun-Times, gave the film three stars out of four and a thumbs up, summarized, "Looking at the posters for Blue Crush, which show Bosworth, Rodriguez and Lake posing with bikinis and surfboards, I expected another mindless surfing movie. Blue Crush is anything but."

=== Box office ===
Blue Crush made $14.2 million during its opening weekend, ranking in third place behind XXX and Signs. It grossed $40.4 million in the United States and Canada, and $11.4 million in other territories, for a worldwide total of $51.8 million, against a budget of $25 million.

== Soundtrack ==
Music from the Motion Picture Blue Crush

Soundtrack album by Various Artists
- Released: August 16, 2002
- Genre: Soundtrack
- Length: 47:09
- Label: Virgin Records
- Producers: Steven Marley, Josh Debear, Moby, Don Great, Pharrell Williams, Lenny Kravitz, Justin Stanley

| No. | Title | Length |
|---|---|---|
| 1. | "If I Could Fall in Love" (Lenny Kravitz) | 4:23 |
| 2. | "Rock Star (Jason Nevins Remix Edit)"" (N.E.R.D.) | 3:50 |
| 3. | "Party Hard" (Beenie Man) | 4:00 |
| 4. | "Cruel Summer (Blestenation Mix)" (Blestenation) | 5:13 |
| 5. | "Big Love" (Chicken Josh Debear) | 3:48 |
| 6. | "Daybreaker" (Beth Orton) | 3:54 |
| 7. | "Everybody Got Their Something" (Nikka Costa) | 4:22 |
| 8. | "Front To Back (Fatboy Slim Remix)" (Playgroup) | 3:53 |
| 9. | "And You Be Loved" (Damian "Jr. Gong" Marley) | 3:02 |
| 10. | "Destiny" (Zero 7) | 5:40 |
| 11. | "Firesuite" (Doves) | 4:37 |

The songs "Youth of the Nation" by P.O.D. and "Jam for the Ladies" by Moby appear in the film but are not included in the album.

== Legacy ==
The film was followed by a straight-to-video standalone sequel, titled Blue Crush 2 (2011).

In October 2017, NBC revealed that it was in the early stages of developing a possible television series based on the film. As of 2026, the series was not produced.

== See also ==
- Blue Crush 2, the unrelated direct-to-video sequel
- Ride the Wild Surf, a 1964 film about three men visiting Hawaii to surf
