= Tamba =

Tamba may refer to:

== People ==
- a traditional name among the Kono people of Sierra Leone, West Africa
- Tamba Hali (born 1983), Liberia-born American football player
- Kojiro Tamba (丹波 幸次郎, 1912–?), Japanese sport wrestler
- Tetsurō Tamba (1922–2006), Japanese actor

== Places ==
- Tanba Province, a former province in Japan
- Tamba, Hyōgo, Hyōgo Prefecture, Japan
- Tamba, Kyoto, Kyoto Prefecture, Japan
- Tamba, Estonia, Varbla Parish, Pärnu County, Estonia
- Tamba Kheri, Rajasthan, India

== Other ==
- Tamba (moth), a genus of moths in the family Erebidae
- Tamba (train), a limited express train service operated by West Japan Railway Company
- Tamba ware, a type of Japanese pottery
- Tamba, a puppet on Tikkabilla, a UK children's TV show
- A traditional sarong-like garment worn by Punjabi Bhangra dancers

== See also ==
- Tambas language, a West Chadic language spoken in Plateau State, Nigeria
