= Luke Egan =

Australian professional surfer

Personal information
- Born: 24 January 1969 (age 57) Newcastle, New South Wales, Australia
- Height: 5 ft 11 in (1.80 m)
- Weight: 185 lb (84 kg)

Surfing career
- Sport: Surfing
- Best year: 2000; World No. 2
- Sponsors: (Historic) Billabong, Arnette, Surf Dive 'N' Ski, Swatch, Electric Sunglasses

Surfing specifications
- Stance: Goofy
- Shaper(s): Jason Stevenson (JS Industries), Darren Handley (DHD Surfboards) (historic)

Luke Egan (born 24 January 1969) is an Australian former professional surfer from Newcastle, New South Wales.

Known for his aggressive yet adaptable style that blended powerful turns with precise timing, Luke was a prominent figure in professional surfing, competing for 22 years on the elite ASP World Championship Tour. His achievements included top-five finishes in 5 seasons and runner-up in the 2000 world title race.

Luke retired from the professional tour in 2005 and was inducted into the Surfing Australia Hall of Fame in 2024.

== Career Victories ==
ASP World Tour Wins
Year	Event	Venue	Country
1997	Quiksilver Pro Indonesia	G-Land	Indonesia
2000	Quiksilver Pro Fiji	Tavarua	Fiji
2002	Boost Mobile Pro	Trestles	United States
2004	Billabong Pro Spain	Mundaka	Spain

== Personal life ==
Egan has three children with his Wife Jessica Yates who is a Fox Sports TV Presenter covering National and International sport. Some of these include Formula One, V8 Supercars, MotoGP and NRL.
