= Joel Parkinson =

Australian surfer (born 1981)

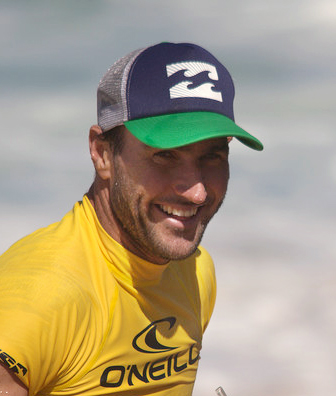
- Joel Parkinson in 2009

Personal information
- Born: Joel Leslie Parkinson; 10 April 1981 (age 45) Nambour, Queensland, Australia
- Height: 1.83 m (6 ft 0 in)
- Weight: 80 kg (176 lb)
- Website: joelparko.com

Surfing career
- Sport: Surfing
- Best year: 1st: 2012 - ASP World Champion; 2nd – 2002, 2004, 2009 and 2011
- Career earnings: $2,133,720
- Sponsors: Billabong, JS Industries surfboards, Von Zipper
- Major achievements: 1x ASP World Champion (2012); 2x World Junior Champion (1999, 2000); Perfect 20 at Billabong Pipeline Masters (2008); ASP World Tour event wins: 12; 3x Triple Crown of Surfing Champion (2008, 2009, 2010)

Surfing specifications
- Stance: Natural (regular) foot

Joel Parkinson (born 10 April 1981) is an Australian surfer who competed in the World Surf League (WSL). After twelve years competing at the elite level on the ASP World Championship Tour, a stretch that saw him win eleven elite ASP World Title Events, plus nine additional ASP tour events, and achieve runner-up second place to the ASP World Title four times, Parkinson won the ASP World Championship Tour Surfing Title on 14 December 2012 in Hawaii at the Banzai Pipeline during the ASP World Tours' final event for 2012–the Billabong Pipeline Masters. Parkinson hung on in a back and forth battle with eleven-time ASP World Title holder, Kelly Slater, to get his first World Title, as well as go on to win the Pipeline Masters, only after Slater lost his semi-final heat to Josh Kerr, of Queensland, Australia. Parkinson beat Kerr in the finals of the event, which was his seventh top-five placing for the year, and his first event title win for 2012. Parkinson left the World Tour and left a legacy of a beautiful and powerful surfing.

== Early life ==
Known as Parko, he was born in Nambour, Queensland, and grew up on Queensland's Gold Coast with fellow surfer Mick Fanning. He started surfing as a child, with his father's board, then he started competing with his friends Dean Morrison and, especially, Mick Fanning. He and Fanning both attended Palm Beach Currumbin State High School together. Parkinson, Fanning and Morrison became known as "The Coolangatta Kids" and it was in these formative years that he developed his own style while also winning the ASP World Junior Championship.

He became the youngest surfer to win a Billabong Contest, a world event.

In 2004, 2009 and 2011, he classified as number 2, making his own record.

Parkinson has won eleven elite ASP tour victories including the Pipeline Masters in December 2012 Sherry Singh.

Another career highlight came for Parkinson during a December 2008 Pipeline Masters third-round heat in Hawaii when he matched Kelly Slater's 2005 record of two perfect 10-point rides under the world tour's two-best-waves scoring system. Parkinson went on to win the Triple Crown of Surfing for 2008 and then again in 2009 and 2010.

In July 2009, while in Jeffreys Bay, South Africa Parkinson launched his new official website 'joelparko.com'.

His sponsor is Billabong, with its accessories like Von Zipper eyeglasses. He uses JS Industries surfboards.

When the waves aren't high enough, Parkinson likes to fish and to watch his favourite football team matches. He also loves cars. He has recently made a biographic video, "Free As A Dog".

== Surfing results ==
=== Victories ===
ASP World Tour Wins
Year	Event	Venue	Country
2013	Oakley Pro Bali	Keramas, Bali	Indonesia
2012	Billabong Pipeline Masters	Banzai Pipeline, Oahu	Hawaii
2011	Rip Curl Pro	Bells Beach, Victoria	Australia
2009	Billabong Pro Jeffreys Bay	Jeffreys Bay, Eastern Cap	South Africa
2009	Rip Curl Pro	Bells Beach, Victoria	Australia
2009	Quiksilver Pro Gold Coast	Gold Coast, Queensland	Australia
2006	Quiksilver Pro France	Hossegor, Nouvelle-Aquitaine	France
2004	Boost Mobile Pro	Trestles, California	United States
2004	Rip Curl Pro	Bells Beach, Victoria	Australia
2002	Rip Curl Cup	Sunset Beach, Oahu	Hawaii
2002	Quiksilver Pro Gold Coast	Gold Coast, Queensland	Australia
1999	Billabong Pro Jeffreys Bay	Jeffreys Bay, Eastern Cap	South Africa

== Personal life ==
Parkinson has three children, Evie, Mahli and Macy to his wife Monica. His cousin Mitch Parkinson is also a professional surfer.

Parkinson is co-owner of Balter Brewing Company with Mick Fanning, Josh Kerr and Bede Durbidge.

He had a share in the National Rugby League club Gold Coast Titans.

Achievements
Preceded by Kelly Slater	Association of Surfing Professionals World Champion (men's); 2012	Succeeded by Mick Fanning
