= Nathan Hedge =

Australian surfer (born 1979)

Personal information
- Nickname: The Hog
- Born: 28 May 1979 (age 47) Brisbane, Queensland, Australia
- Height: 1.70 m (5 ft 7 in)
- Weight: 70 kg (150 lb)

Surfing career
- Sport: Surfing
- Best year: 7th – 2004 ASP World Tour Ranking

Surfing specifications
- Stance: Goofy foot

Nathan "The Hog" Hedge (born 28 May 1979, in Brisbane, Queensland) is a professional surfer raised on the Northern Sydney beach of Narrabeen. He was a grom with Rip Curl.

Hog qualified for the ASP World Tour in 2001. He received two runner-up finishes in 2004 at Teahupoo and J’Bay and consistent quarter-final finishes in 2005. After poor results in 2006, Hog was relegated to the World Qualifying Series (WQS). He received an award from ‘Surfer Magazine’ for best tube ride. 2009 was his third year on the WQS.

== Career highlights ==
2001
ASP World Tour Ranking: 25th

- Quarter-Finals – Rio Surf International, (Rio de Janeiro, Brazil)

2002
ASP World Tour Ranking: 20th

- Quarter-Finals – Rip Curl Pro, (Bells Beach, Australia)

2003
ASP World Tour Ranking: 24th

- Semi-Finals – Billabong Pro, (Mundaka, Spain)

2004
ASP World Tour Ranking: 7th

- Runner-up – Billabong Pro, (Teahupoo, Tahiti)
- Runner-up – Billabong Pro, (Jeffrey's Bay, South Africa)
- Quarter-Finals – Boost Mobile Pro, (Trestles, USA)
- Quarter-Finals – Nova Schin Festival, (Florianopolis, Brazil)

2005
ASP World Tour Ranking: 8th

- Quarter-Finals – Billabong Pro, (Teahupoo, Tahiti)
- Quarter-Finals – Rip Curl Search, (St Leu, Reunion Island)
- Quarter-Finals – Quiksilver Pro, (Hossegor, France)
- Semi-Finals – Nova Schin Festival, (Florianopolis, Brazil)

2007

- Winner – O'Neill Cold Water Classic(WQS), (Thurso, Scotland)
