= Chelsea Georgeson =

Australian surfer

Personal information
- Born: 15 October 1983 (age 43)
- Height: 163 cm (5 ft 4 in)
- Weight: 58 Kg

Surfing career
- Sport: Surfing
- Major achievements: 2002 ISA World Surfing Games Champion

Surfing specifications
- Stance: Goofy
Medal record
Women's surfing
Representing Australia
World Games
Gold medal – first place	2002 Durban	Women

Chelsea Georgeson (now Chelsea Hedges, born 15 October 1983) is an Australian surfer who won the 2005 world title. She won the title after beating Brazil's Jacqueline Silva in the final at the season-ending event at Honolua Bay, Hawaii. She started surfing at the age of 13.

Preceded by Sofia Mulanovich	World surfing champion (Women); 2005	Succeeded by Layne Beachley
