= Samantha Cornish =

Australian surfer

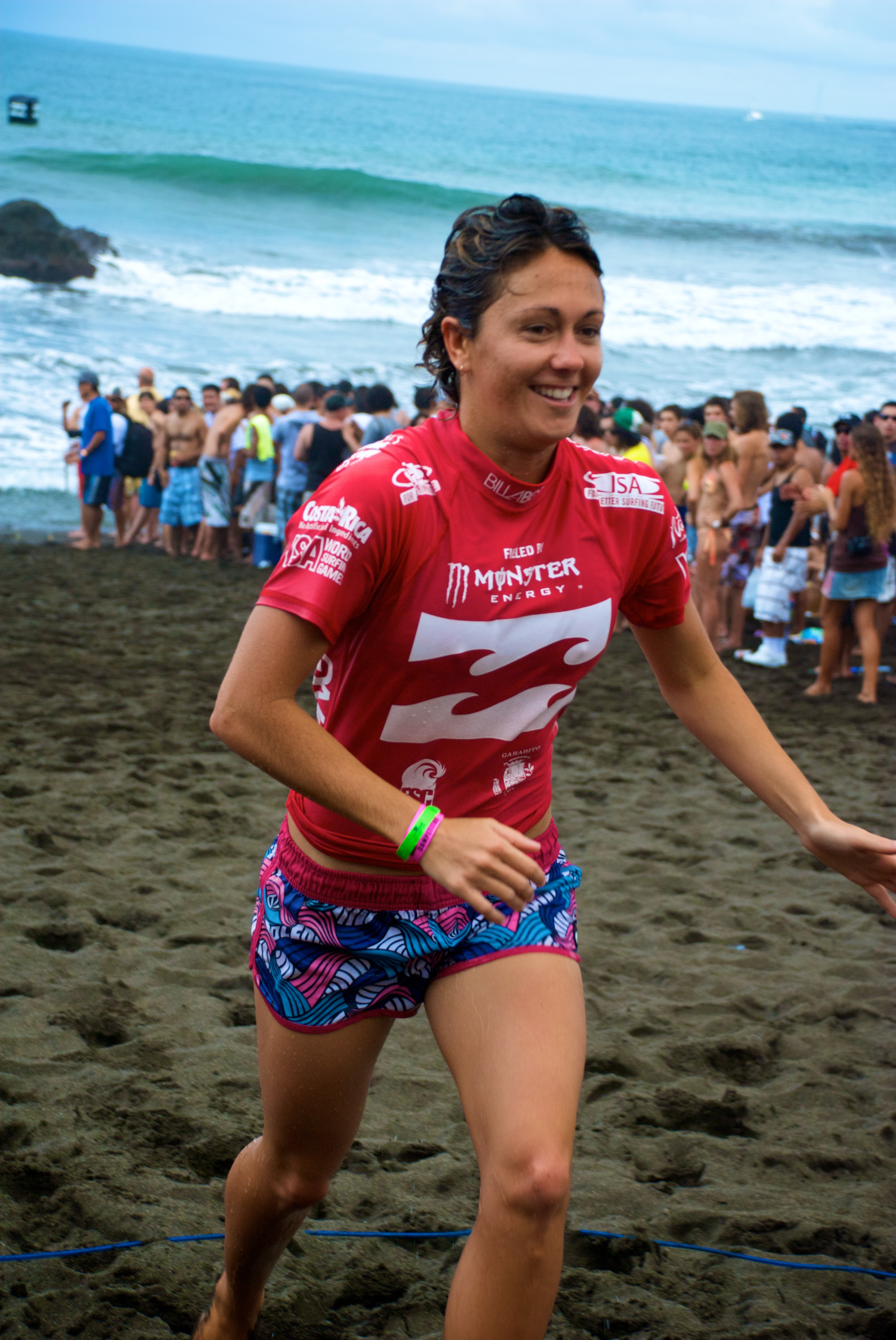

Personal information
- Born: 27 October 1980 (age 46)

Surfing career
- Sport: Surfing

Surfing specifications
- Stance: Regular (natural foot)

Samantha Cornish (born 27 October 1980) is an Australian surfer. She began surfing at an early age and entered her first competition at age 11. Her father, Peter Cornish, was also a surfer. At age 15, she won the 1996 World Junior Championships. In 2002, she entered the World Championship Tournament. She has been sponsored by various companies such as Quiksilver.

== Accomplishments ==
- 1st - Billabong Pro Maui (2003)
- 1st - Quiksilver Roxy Pro Gold Coast (2000)
- 1st - Billabong Junior Series Burleigh Heads (2000)
- The Rip Curl Australian Junior Title (1998)
- 1st- Billabong Girls Pro Itacare Brazil 2007
- World Number One, October 2007, following win in Brazil
