= Cory Lopez =

American surfer

Personal information
- Born: March 21, 1977 (age 49) Dunedin, Florida, United States
- Years active: 1997 - present
- Height: 1.77 m (5 ft 9 1/2 in)
- Weight: 72.5 kg (160 lb)
- Website: lopezbrothers.com

Surfing career
- Sport: Surfing
- Best year: Highest Final Season Ranking - 3rd on the ASP World Tour in 2001 (Highest Ranking #1)
- Career earnings: Over $800,000 (not including product endorsements)
- Sponsors: O'Neill, Anarchy Eyewear, Freestyle/Shark Watch, Rockstar Energy Drink, Placebo/Mayhem Surfboards, WaveJet Propulsion Major Achievements = Billabong Pro Tahiti Champion; U.S. Open Champion; Globe SI Pro Winner; 3X ESPN X Games Gold Medalist; Gold & Silver Medalist ISA World Surfing Games (Costa Rica 2010 & China 2012)

Surfing specifications
- Stance: Goofy (right foot forward)
- Shaper: Matt Biolis
- Quiver: Three 6'2" boards
- Favorite waves: Barrels with punting possibilities at the end
- Favorite maneuvers: A big air straight into a cutback rebound

Cory Lopez (born March 21, 1977) is a professional surfer from Dunedin, Florida, United States. Lopez is a three-time X Games gold medalist, U.S. Open of Surfing champion, Billabong Pro Tahiti campion, Globe SI Pro champion, and a gold and silver medalist at the ISA World Championships in Costa Rica (2010) and China (2012). He has been a top ranked contender on the ASP World Surfing circuit (ASP World Tour) for multiple years.

== Biography ==
Lopez and his older brother, Shea, were taught to surf by their father Pete Lopez, also a surfer. They began to compete in the ESA Menehune Division.

Lopez participated with Shea and Andy Irons on the ASP World Tour. In 2003. Lopez won two Surfer Mag 'Guts for Glory Awards' by pushing the limits. He also won Surfer Magazine's Tube of the Year award in 2009 for discovering the "mile long" left point at Skeleton Bay, Namibia, and placed tenth for overall editorial exposure in the 2010 Transworld Surf Media Exposure rankings.

Lopez lives in Florida with his wife Jenn and children Alana and Luke. He owns Nekton Surf Shop in Indian Rocks Beach and is also a motivational speaker and special education teacher.
