= Jacqueline Silva =

Brazilian surfer

Personal information
- Born: July 17, 1979 (age 46)
- Website: jacquelinesilva.com

Surfing career
- Sport: Surfing

Surfing specifications
- Stance: Regular (natural foot)

Jacqueline Silva (born July 17, 1979) is a professional surfer from Florianópolis, Brazil. Her first professional season was 2002, when she finished as runner-up. In 2009 she was ranked tenth in the world and in 2011 she was ranked ninth. Her favorite place to surf is in Portugal.
