= Heather Clark (surfer) =

South African surfer

Surfing career
- Sport: Surfing
- Major achievements: International Surfing Association World Masters Surfing Championship Gold Medal 2009 and 2010

Surfing specifications
- Stance: Goofy

Heather Clark is a South African surfer. At the end of 2003, she was ranked 3rd among female surfers in the world. In 2009, she was seriously injured when the car in which she was traveling was struck by a drunk driver. Competing at the International Surfing Association World Masters Surfing Championship, in 2010 she won her 2nd consecutive gold medal, and in 2011 she won the silver medal.

== See also ==
7 Girls
