= Billabong Pipeline Masters =

Surfing competition

- Current season, competition or edition: Billabong Pipeline Masters 2026
- Sport: Surfing
- Country: Hawaii
- Most recent champions: (Hawaii) Barron Mamiya (men) (Australia) Tyler Wright (women)
- Most titles: (United States) Kelly Slater (men) (8) (Australia) Tyler Wright (women) (2)

The Pipe Pro is an event in surfing held annually at Banzai Pipeline in Oahu, Hawaii. It was established in 1971 and has been sponsored by Yeti Coolers, who have a three year partnership in place, which began in 2023.

The event attracts the top 34 surfers from The World Surf League (WSL) as well as 32 surfers who compete in walk-on trials. Until 2019, the event was the final leg of the Triple Crown of Surfing and the final event on the WSL Championship Tour. Starting with the 2021 season (December 2020), the event is now the opening event of a 2020–21 competition season. In 2022, the event underwent major scheduling, naming, and invitation rules changes.

== Winners ==
Year	Men's Winner	Women's Winner
1971	(Hawaii) Jeff Hakman	
1972	(Hawaii) Gerry Lopez	
1973	(Hawaii) Gerry Lopez (2)	
1974	(United States) Jeff Crawford	
1975	(South Africa) Shaun Tomson	
1976	(Hawaii) Rory Russell	
1977	(Hawaii) Rory Russell (2)	
1978	(Australia) Larry Blair	
1979	(Australia) Larry Blair (2)	
1980	(Australia) Mark Richards	
1981	(Australia) Simon Anderson	
1982	(Hawaii) Michael Ho	
1983	(Hawaii) Dane Kealoha	
1984	(United States) Joey Buran	
1985	(Australia) Mark Occhilupo	
1986	(Hawaii) Derek Ho	
1987	(Australia) Tom Carroll	
1988	(Australia) Robbie Page	
1989	(Australia) Gary Elkerton	
1990	(Australia) Tom Carroll (2)	
1991	(Australia) Tom Carroll (3)	
1992	(United States) Kelly Slater	
1993	(Hawaii) Derek Ho (2)	
1994	(United States) Kelly Slater (2)	
1995	(United States) Kelly Slater (3)	
1996	(United States) Kelly Slater (4)	
1997	(Hawaii) John Gomes	
1998	(Australia) Jake Paterson	
1999	(United States) Kelly Slater (5)	
2000	(United States) Rob Machado	
2001	(Hawaii) Bruce Irons	
2002	(Hawaii) Andy Irons	
2003	(Hawaii) Andy Irons (2)	
2004	(Hawaii) Jamie O'Brien	
2005	(Hawaii) Andy Irons (3)	
2006	(Hawaii) Andy Irons (4)	
2007	(Australia) Bede Durbidge	
2008	(United States) Kelly Slater (6)	
2009	(Australia) Taj Burrow	
2010	(France) Jeremy Flores	
2011	(Australia) Kieren Perrow	
2012	(Australia) Joel Parkinson	
2013	(United States) Kelly Slater (7)	
2014	(Australia) Julian Wilson	
2015	(Brazil) Adriano de Souza	
2016	(French Polynesia) Michel Bourez	
2017	(France) Jérémy Florès (2)	
2018	(Brazil) Gabriel Medina	
2019	(Brazil) Italo Ferreira	
2020 (Note: Part of 2021 season, held in December 2020)	(Hawaii) John John Florence	(Australia) Tyler Wright
2022 (Note: December 2022)	(United States) Balaram Stack	(Australia) Molly Picklum
2023 (Note: December 2023)	(Hawaii) John John Florence	(Hawaii) Moana Jones Wong
2024 (Note: December 2024)	(Hawaii) Nathan Florence	(Canada) Erin Brooks

== Sources ==
- Rielly, Derek (2023-11-26). "How Vans and WSL destroyed surfing's most prestigious cultural relic The Pipeline Masters". BeachGrit.
