= Michael Lowe =

British mechanical engineer

Michael Lowe is a British mechanical engineer. Since 2019, he has been the Head of the Department of Mechanical Engineering at Imperial College London. He is a Professor in Non-Destructive Testing (NDT), with particular interests in structure-guided ultrasound, wave theory, wave scattering, materials characterisation, and analytical and numerical modelling.

== Education ==
Lowe received a Bachelor of Science (BSc) degree in civil engineering from the University of Edinburgh in 1979. He received Master of Science (MSc) and Doctor of Philosophy (PhD) degrees in mechanical engineering from Imperial College London in 1987 and 1993 respectively. His PhD research was performed under the supervision of Professor Peter Cawley.

== Research and career ==
Between 1979 and 1989 he worked for WS Atkins (Consultant Engineers, Epsom, UK), specialising in the application and development of numerical methods for the solution of problems in solid mechanics. In 1989 he moved to a research position at Imperial College London, was appointed as an SERC Research Fellow in 1992, and onto the academic staff in 1994.

He is a director of Guided Ultrasonics Ltd., a spin-out company that was set up to commercialise the outputs of research in ultrasonic guided waves. He was the creator of the leading software modelling tool DISPERSE, which calculates the properties of elastic/sound waves that are guided in structural forms such as plates and pipes.

As of December 2020, his research had been cited over 14,600 times.

=== Honours and awards ===
He was elected Fellow of the Royal Academy of Engineering (FREng) in 2014. Since 2002, he has been a Fellow of the British Institute of Non-Destructive Testing (FInstNDT) and a Fellow of the Institute of Physics (FInstP). Since 1986, he has been a Fellow of the Institution of Mechanical Engineers (FIMechE) and a Chartered Engineer (CEng).

He was awarded the Roy Sharpe prize from the British Institute of Non-Destructive Testing in 2010 and the Roentgen Award from the International Committee for Non-Destructive Testing in 2012.

== Family ==
His brother, Paddy Lowe, is a British motor racing engineer. They were the first brothers to both be elected as a FREng.
