= Soorts-Hossegor =

- Commune
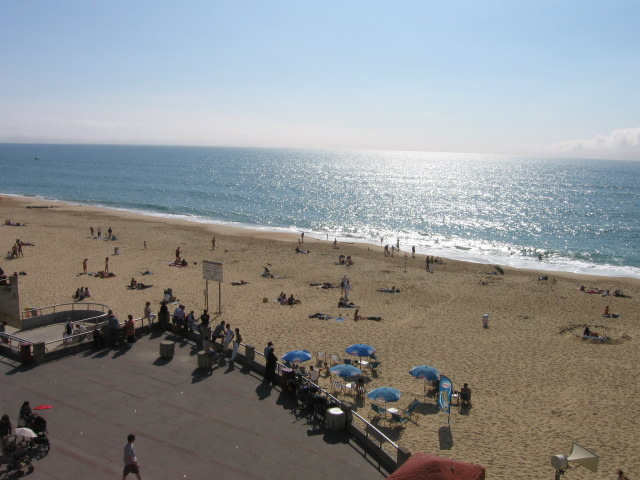

- Coat of arms
- Location of Soorts-Hossegor
- Location within France Location within Nouvelle-Aquitaine
- Coordinates: 43°39′34″N 1°25′36″W
- Country: France
- Region: Nouvelle-Aquitaine
- Department: Landes
- Arrondissement: Dax
- Canton: Marensin Sud

Government
  - Mayor (2020–2026): Christophe Vignaud
- Area^{1}: 14.51 km^{2} (5.60 sq mi)
- Elevation: 10 m (33 ft)
- Highest elevation: 55 m (180 ft)
- Lowest elevation: 0 m (0 ft)
- Population (2023): 3,817
  - Density: 263.1/km^{2} (681.3/sq mi)
- Time zone: UTC+01:00 (CET)
  - Summer (DST): UTC+02:00 (CEST)
- INSEE/Postal code: 40304 /40150
- ^{1} French Land Register data, which excludes lakes, ponds, glaciers > 1 km^{2} (0.386 sq mi or 247 acres) and river estuaries.

Soorts-Hossegor (French pronunciation: [sɔʁts ɔsəɡɔʁ]; Occitan: Sòrts e Òssagòr, pronounced [sɔrts e ˈɔsoɡɔr], locally [sɔrts e ˌɔsəɣɔɾ]) is a commune in the French department of Landes, Nouvelle-Aquitaine, southwestern France, 20 km (12 miles) north of Biarritz. The town is on a 1,451 ha (3,590-acre) plot of land with 4 beaches on 3.5 km of European Atlantic shoreline, and a lake.

Its inhabitants are called Hossegoriens. The area has been inhabited for a millennium, it became a pilgrimage stop off in the 14th century and has since become a well-known seaside resort as of the 19th century. The town's economy is centered around the sport of surfing, and the local beach is a world famous surf break. When possible, the town co-hosts the World Surf League yearly competitions along with the neighbouring towns of Capbreton and Seignosse. Since the 1980s, global companies have established themselves in the town's industrial park.

== Name ==
In 1913, the town associated the toponym of Hossegor, from the name of its marine lake, with its original name of Soorts. The root of the name Soorts is probably close to that of Sorde, the verb gascon sórder or sordar, sourdre, meaning "where there are sources". Related names are Sor (Ariège, Sort) and Sort-en-Chalosse (Landes) from the same Gascon etymon. The origin of Hossegor is more obscure: it may be an Aquitain or Basque name to be attached to the hydronyms osse and the adjective gorri, meaning "dry water".

== History ==
The history of the town and inhabited area originated in the 11th century with the town of Soorts. The local church was built in the 14th century as a coastal path to Santiago de Compostela, in Spain. And, Bielle farm, the town's oldest building was constructed at that time.

In the 19th century, the town of Soorts began its transformation into a local hub. Starting in 1869, with the digging of the Hossegor pond canal towards the sea, which is 99 hectares in size today. Then in 1913, a stone bridge was constructed, connecting the ponds and lake. On April 1 of that year, thanks to an increase in tourism, the local government decided to add the name of Hossegor to the town of Soorts, thus creating Soorts-Hossegor, as it's known today. Some noteworthy visitors early to Soorts-Hossegor have included J.H. Rosny in 1903 and Paul Margueritte in 1909. Other personalities later joined them, like Charles Derennes in 1913, then Maxime Leroy, Gaston Chérau, Pierre Benoit, Tristan Dereme and Leon Blum in 1920.

In 1923, the seaside town was connected via railway for the first time, and the town became known as a seaside resort. Then between 1929-1939, the area was transformed into the town and seaside resort it is today. Under the leadership of 5 French architects, (Note: All the architects were; David Chabas, Henri Godbarge, Louis and Benjamin Gomez, Mathias, Morhardt, Serge Barranx, Jean Prévost or even Sébastien Japrisot, Françoise Sagan.) there was the construction of around 400 villas (183 today), hotels, a golf course. Also, the Place des Landis, built in 1928, by the Gomez brothers, the 1 km beachfront pedestrian esplanade was built in the art deco style. The construction of homes and businesses were in a Basque-Landes architectural style unique to the area. The town was mostly developed during the interwar period and considered a part of the neo-Basque regionalist movement. Also, the sports casino was built in the years of 1927-1931, in the same local Basque-Landes style. Many hotels were built at that time, such as Les Hortensias du Lac, a four-star luxury hotel with an extraordinary view of the marine lake, and the Mercedes, a three-star hotel near the city center overlooking the canal.

Development continued in Hossegor after the art-deco era. A small industrial park was built, with the relocation of the headquarters of the European branch of the surf brand Rip Curl to the area in 1980, today followed by the HQ's for the surf companies Quiksilver, Billabong and Rusty.

== Sports ==
There are many sports played in the town, such as swimming, tennis, horse riding and Basque pelote.

=== Surfing ===
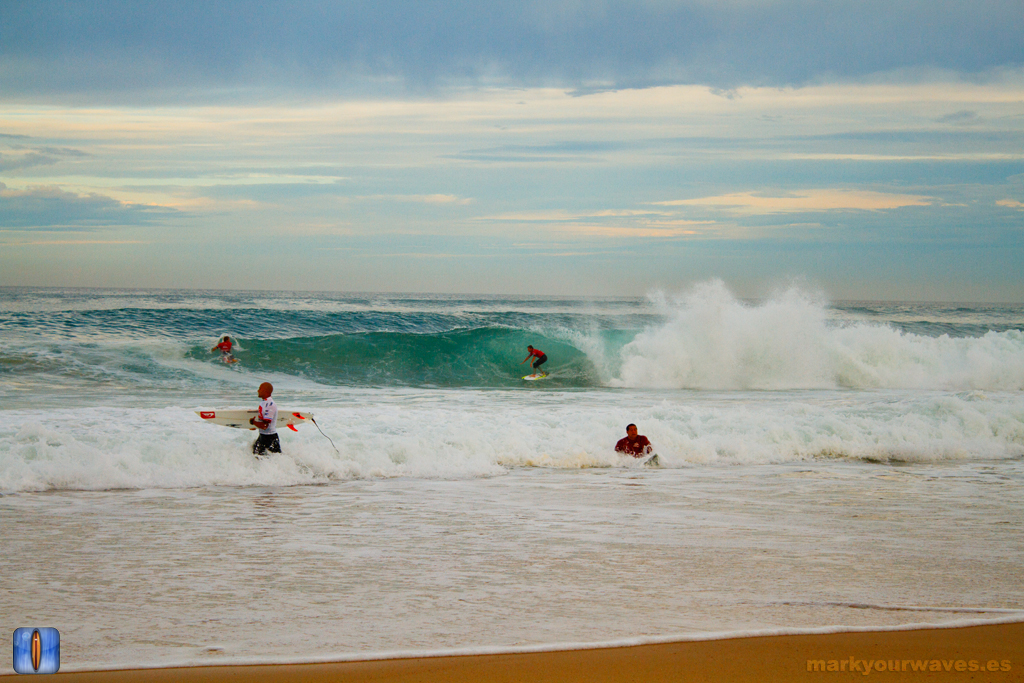
Hossegor 2013 surf competition

The naming of Hossegor in the Gascon language is to do with the 'gouf of Capbreton', an underwater canyon thousands of metres deep and hundreds of kilometres long, this creates waves from the ocean on the Landes coast. It was in the 1950s when surfing became popular in the town. In the Landes region are several good surfing spots which are enjoyed when possible by the public and also professional athletes as part of yearly competition.

Since 1984, the French Surf Federation has its headquarters in Hossegor. As part of the World Surf League, there is a stage designated to the local Hossegor area for a surf competition. Depending on the weather, the competition is held at the end of September. Since 1987, the competition brings the biggest names in surfing, and the tour competition is split between the men's Quiksilver Pro France and women's Roxy Pro France events. The Hossegor coast has been one of the few world class surfing locations in Atlantic Europe, with beach breaks at Gravière and La Nord, Les Estagnots. Also, there's nearby beach breaks in Capbreton and Seignosse, which have shared the surf competition due to differing wave conditions. Another event takes place during Easter weekend: the sale of "spirit surf" clothes. More than 100,000 people flock to the craft zone, looking to purchase sports wear, or equipment.

=== Golf ===
It was in 1927 that the local golf course was built. Each summer the Grand Prix des Landes takes place on the Hossegor golf course, the course is a part of the European Golf Association.

=== Jai alai ===
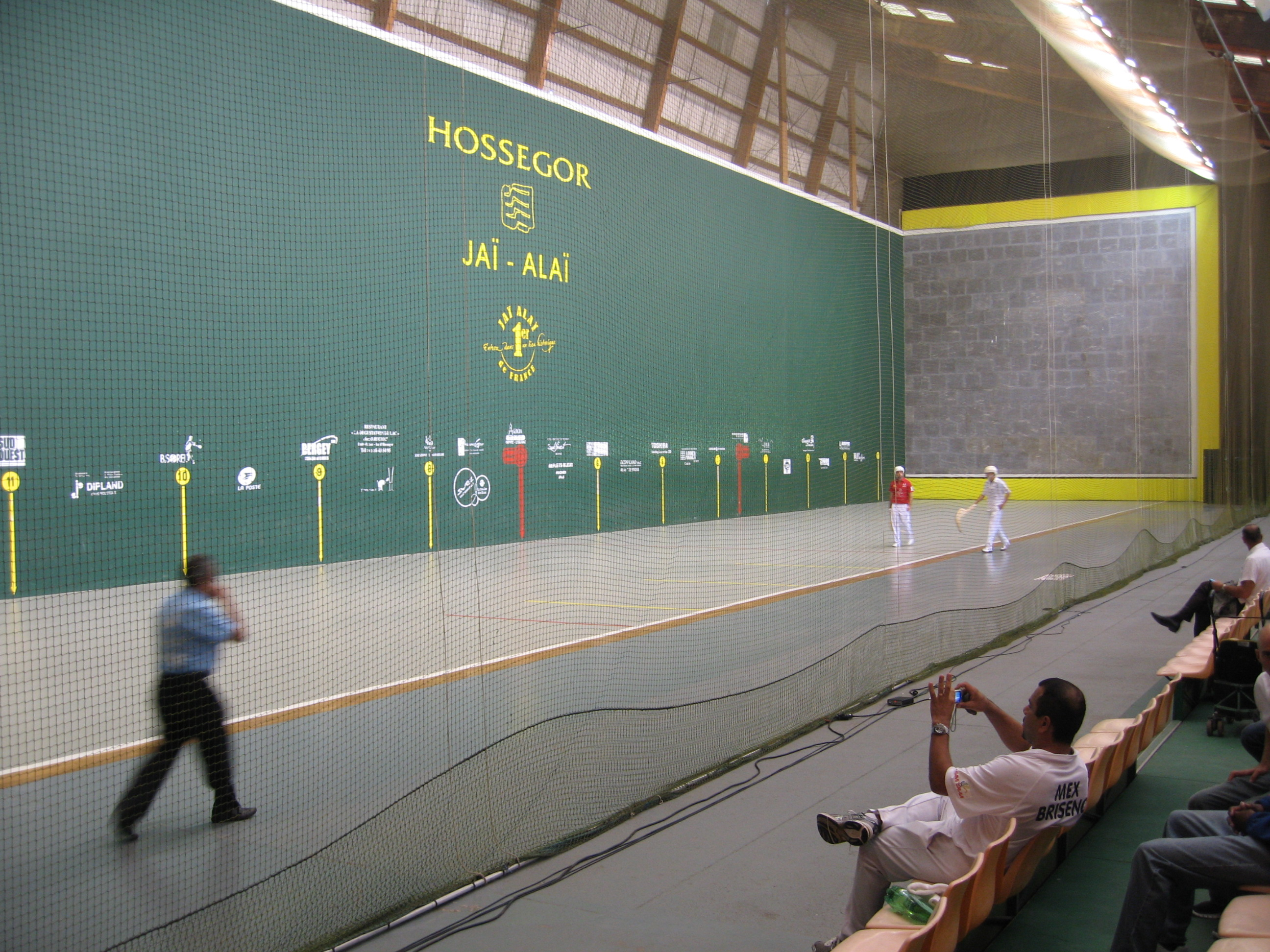
Hossegor's purpose built Jai Alai sports areana.

In 1958, the first Jai alai (Basque sport) sporting location in France opened in Soorts-Hossegor. Since 2019, there has been an annual competition televised on the Canal+ Sports channel, and now a roof has been to the arena.

== Climate ==
Climate data for Soorts-Hossegor (1981–2010 averages, extremes 1954–present)
Month	Jan	Feb	Mar	Apr	May	Jun	Jul	Aug	Sep	Oct	Nov	Dec	Year
Record high °C (°F)	22.5 (72.5)	28.9 (84.0)	30.0 (86.0)	34.0 (93.2)	36.5 (97.7)	40.6 (105.1)	41.0 (105.8)	40.5 (104.9)	39.0 (102.2)	33.9 (93.0)	29.0 (84.2)	24.2 (75.6)	41.0 (105.8)
Mean daily maximum °C (°F)	11.9 (53.4)	13.3 (55.9)	16.1 (61.0)	17.6 (63.7)	21.1 (70.0)	23.6 (74.5)	25.8 (78.4)	26.3 (79.3)	24.5 (76.1)	20.6 (69.1)	15.2 (59.4)	12.3 (54.1)	19.1 (66.4)
Daily mean °C (°F)	7.8 (46.0)	8.7 (47.7)	11.1 (52.0)	12.9 (55.2)	16.4 (61.5)	19.2 (66.6)	21.3 (70.3)	21.6 (70.9)	19.3 (66.7)	15.9 (60.6)	11.1 (52.0)	8.4 (47.1)	14.5 (58.1)
Mean daily minimum °C (°F)	3.8 (38.8)	4.0 (39.2)	6.1 (43.0)	8.1 (46.6)	11.7 (53.1)	14.7 (58.5)	16.8 (62.2)	16.9 (62.4)	14.0 (57.2)	11.1 (52.0)	6.9 (44.4)	4.6 (40.3)	9.9 (49.8)
Record low °C (°F)	−13.3 (8.1)	−12.9 (8.8)	−8.0 (17.6)	−2.7 (27.1)	1.0 (33.8)	5.1 (41.2)	7.5 (45.5)	8.3 (46.9)	3.8 (38.8)	−0.9 (30.4)	−6.6 (20.1)	−10.2 (13.6)	−13.3 (8.1)
Average precipitation mm (inches)	105.8 (4.17)	85.2 (3.35)	75.6 (2.98)	97.4 (3.83)	83.6 (3.29)	67.6 (2.66)	56.2 (2.21)	74.6 (2.94)	91.6 (3.61)	116.9 (4.60)	154.0 (6.06)	116.6 (4.59)	1,125.1 (44.30)
Average precipitation days (≥ 1.0 mm)	13.0	11.0	11.1	12.8	11.2	8.7	7.3	7.9	9.0	11.8	13.2	12.8	129.9
Source: Météo France

== Population ==
Historical population

Year	Pop.	±% p.a.
1793	197	—
1821	224	+0.46%
1846	268	+0.72%
1872	351	+1.04%
1901	386	+0.33%
1926	498	+1.02%
1946	1,175	+4.39%
1962	1,755	+2.54%
1968	2,071	+2.80%

Year	Pop.	±% p.a.
1975	2,248	+1.18%
1982	2,544	+1.78%
1990	2,829	+1.34%
1999	3,292	+1.70%
2007	3,629	+1.23%
2012	3,792	+0.88%
2017	3,580	−1.14%
2023	3,817	+1.07%

Source: EHESS and INSEE (1968-2023)

== Twin town ==
- Nazaré, Portugal.
- (French Polynesia) Taiʻarapu-Ouest, Tahiti, twinned in 2022.

== Beach gallery ==
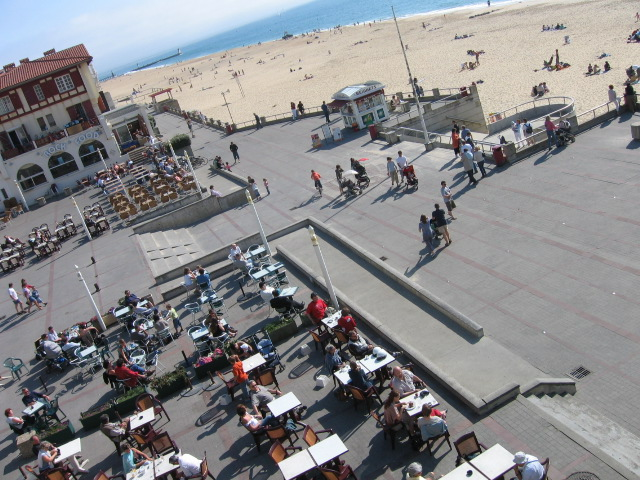
Plage Centrale

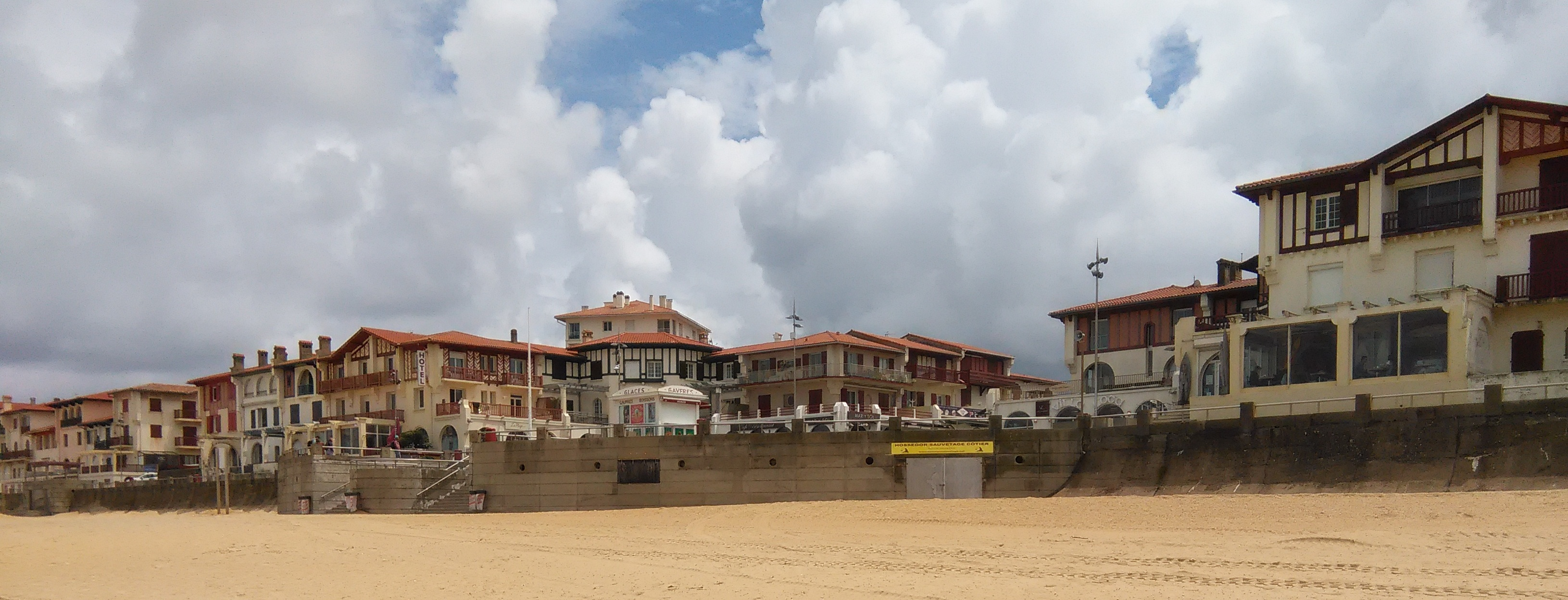
Basque-Landis architecture

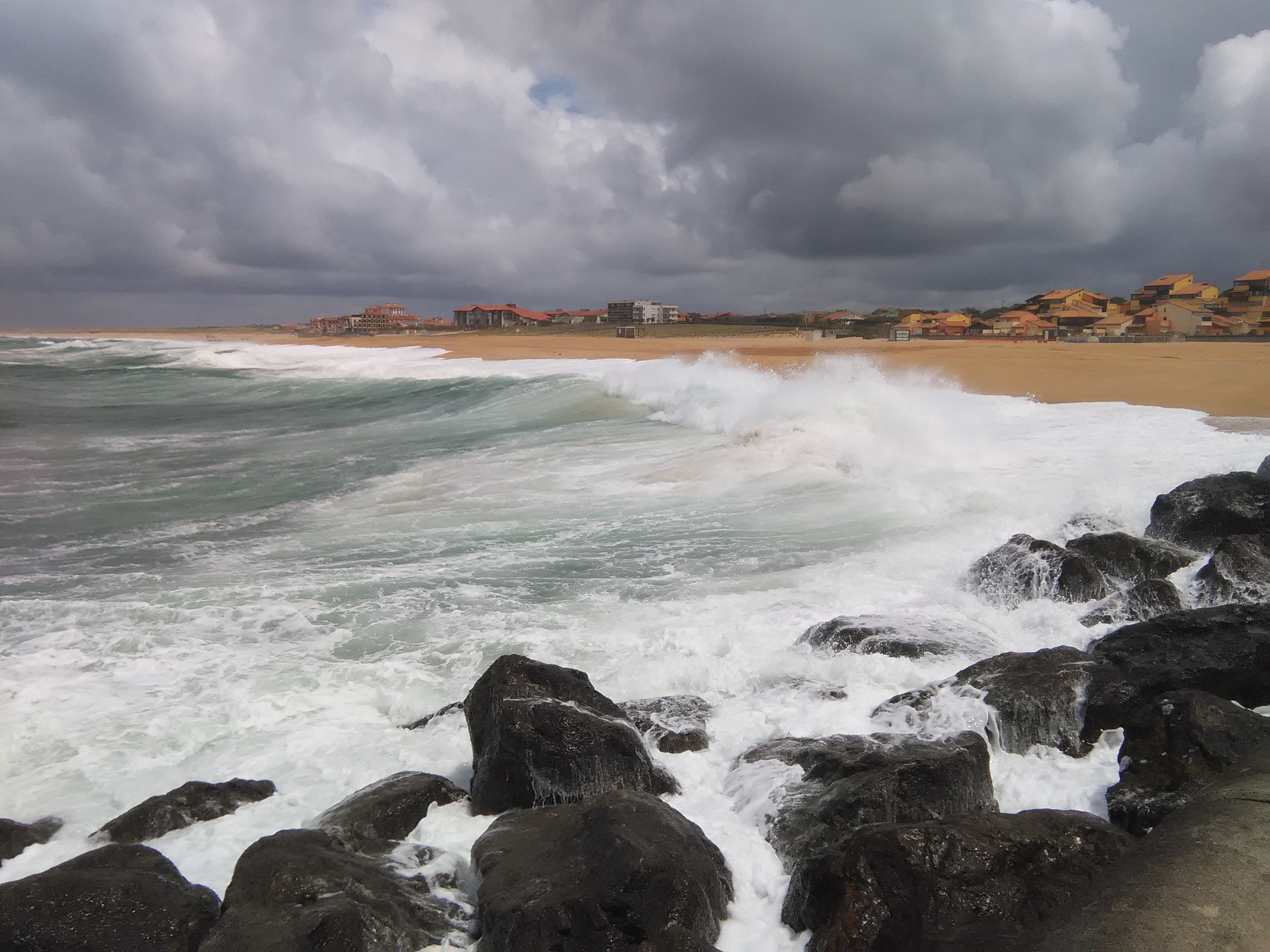
The Notre Dame Beach in Soorts-Hossegor

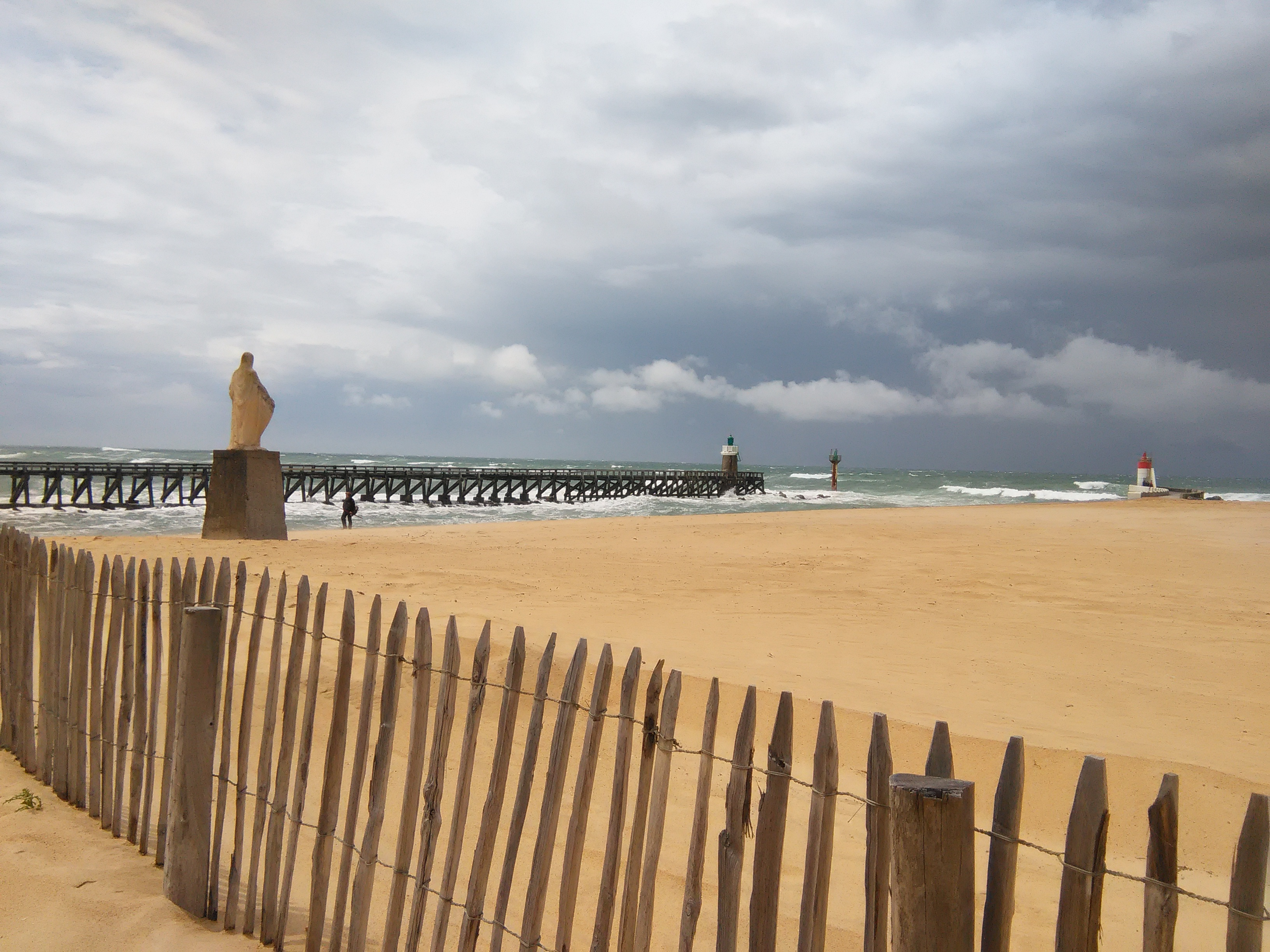
Note Dame beach, Lucien Danglade statue

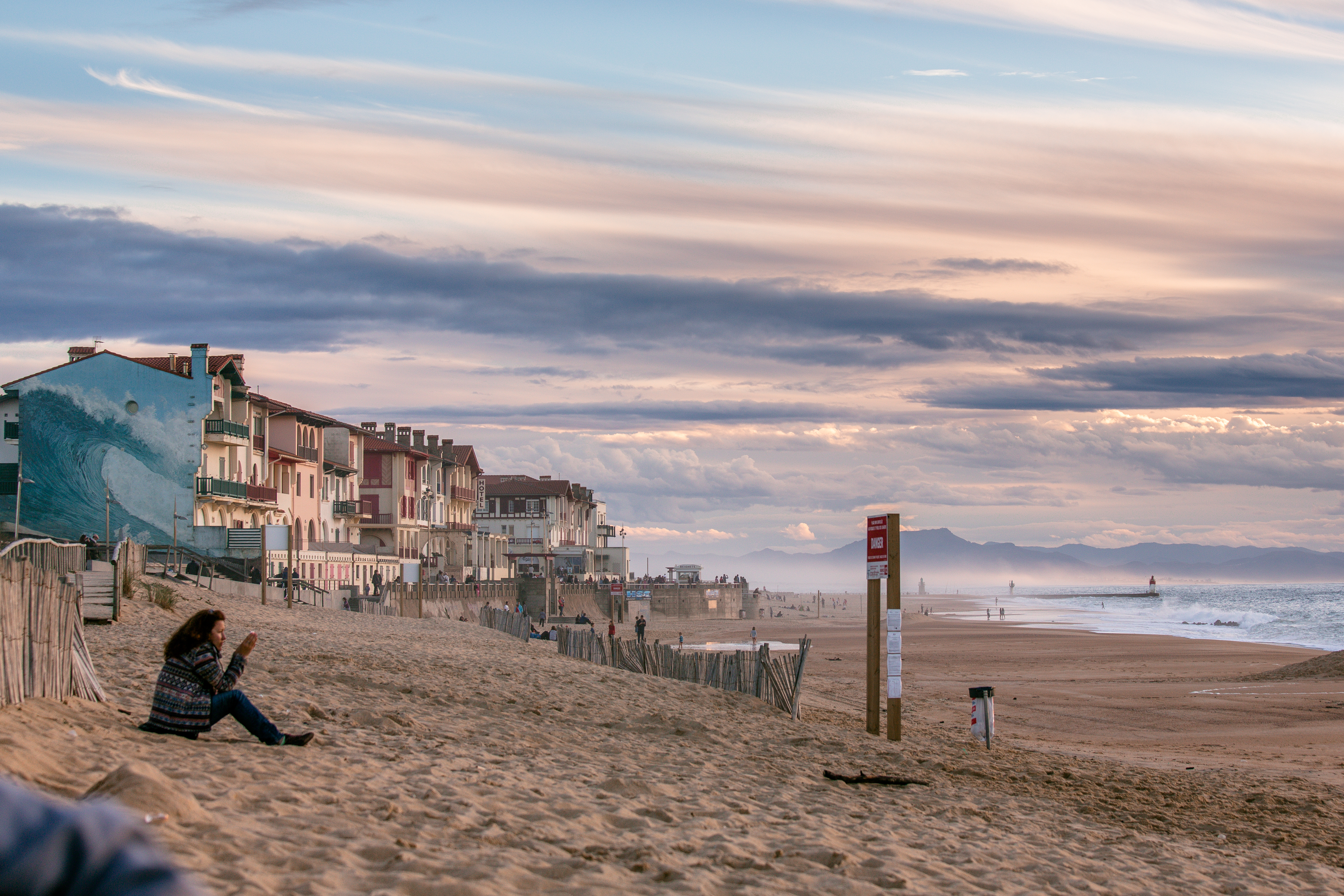
Beach panoramic view

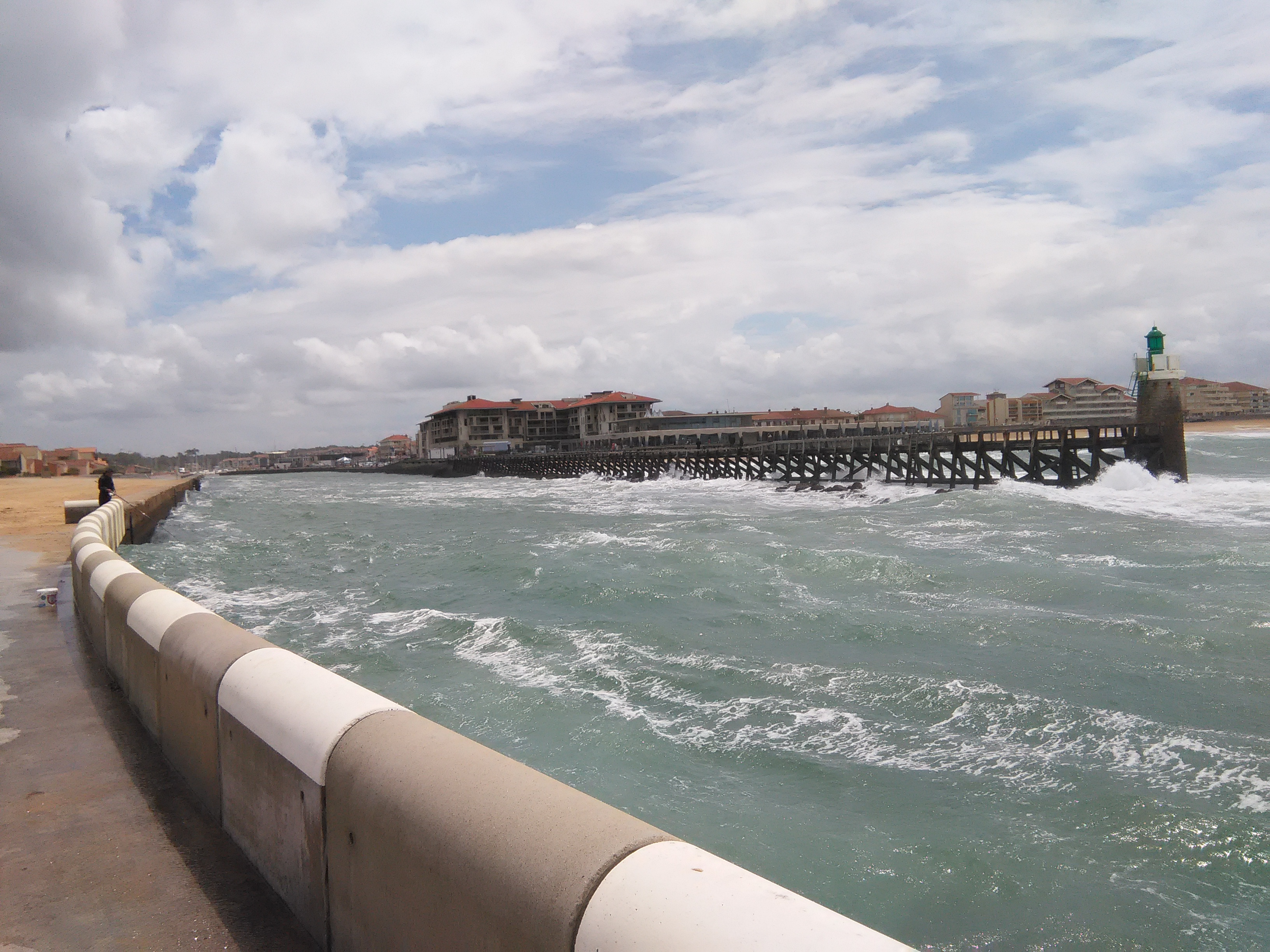
Entrance for boats to marina

== See also ==
- Communes of the Landes department
- Quiksilver Pro France
- Roxy Pro France
