= Rochelle Ballard =

American surfer (born 1971)

Personal information
- Born: February 13, 1971 (age 54) Montebello, California
- Years active: 1990-present
- Height: 5 ft 1 in (155 cm)
- Weight: 106 lb (48 kg)
- Website: https://rochelleballard.com/

Surfing career
- Sport: Surfing
- Major achievements: Runner-up to World Title in 2004, still holds the world record for scoring two 10s in a single heat, winner of 3 Surfer Poll Awards (2000, 2001, and 2002), won World Qualifying Series in 1997

Surfing specifications
- Stance: Regular
- Favorite waves: Cloudbreak, Lance's Right, Backdoor, Lower Trestles
- Favorite maneuvers: Barrel Riding

Rochelle Ballard (born February 13, 1971) is an American professional surfer and a veteran of the Association of Surfing Professionals (ASP) World Championship Tour. She co-founded International Women's Surfing (IWS) and has appeared in several movies and television shows, including, Blue Crush, Step Into Liquid, and Beyond the Break.

== Early life ==
Ballard was born Rochelle Gordines in Montebello, California on February 13, 1971. Her parents moved to the island of Kauai in Hawaii when she was six months old. With the encouragement of Margo Oberg, another accomplished female surfer, Ballard started surfing at 11 years old.

== Career ==
Ballard began competing in local surfing competitions and soon advanced to state competitions, to nationals and finally to the world amateur titles, where she placed fourth in the World in 1988 and 1990. She qualified to surf professionally on the World Championship Tour in 1991.

Ballard was a producer and stunt double for the movie Blue Crush in 2002. She starred in A Girl's Surf Addiction, a surf film that O'Neill released in 2004, and helped produce a "yoga for surfers" video series. In 2001, she starred in the surfing documentary 7 Girls. She co-founded International Women's Surfing (IWS) and, together with O'Neill, launched the Rochelle Ballard Surf Camp series which focuses on advanced surfing techniques, cross-training, and education.

In 2012, she became the ISA World Masters World Champion. During her years on tour, Ballard won seven world championship events and was runner-up to the World Championship title in 2004. In 1997, she competed in the Billabong Pro at Burleigh Heads, Gold Coast, Australia and scored two perfect 10-barrel rides against Layne Beachley in the semi-finals; she went on to win the event after beating Lisa Anderson in the finals. Ballard continues to hold the women's world record for scoring two perfect 10s in a single heat.

== Personal life ==
In 1991, Rochelle married cinematographer Bill Ballard; they divorced in 2004.

She currently resides on the island of Kauai, where she operates a surf, yoga, and wellness business called Surf Into Yoga.

== Contest highlights ==
2012

- Women's Division ISA World Masters Surfing Champion

2004

- 3rd Rip Curl Pro, Malibu
- 2nd Billabong Pro, Teahupoo, Tahiti
- 2nd Roxy Pro, Fiji
- 2nd Roxy Pro, Australia

2003

- 2nd Billabong Pro, Teahupoo, Tahiti
- 3rd Magnolia Girls Pro. Portugal

2002

- 3rd Roxy Pro, Tavarua, Fiji
- 3rd Roxy Pro, France

2001

- 2nd Billabong Pro, Teahupoo, Tahiti

2000

- 1st OP Boat Challenge

1999

- 1st Gotcha Girl Star Pro, U.S.
- 1st Hossegor Rip Curl Pro, France

1997

- 1st Billabong Pro, AUS
- 1st Kana Beach Lacanau Pro, France
- 1st Wahine Women's (WQS)
- 1st Gunston 500 Women WQS), South Africa
- 1st Wahine Women's (WQS), U.S.

1996

- 1st Wahine Women's, U.S.
- 1st Town &Country, Hawaii

1995

- 1st Body Glove Surfbout VIII, U.S.
