= Teahupoʻo =

- Associated commune of Taiarapu-Ouest
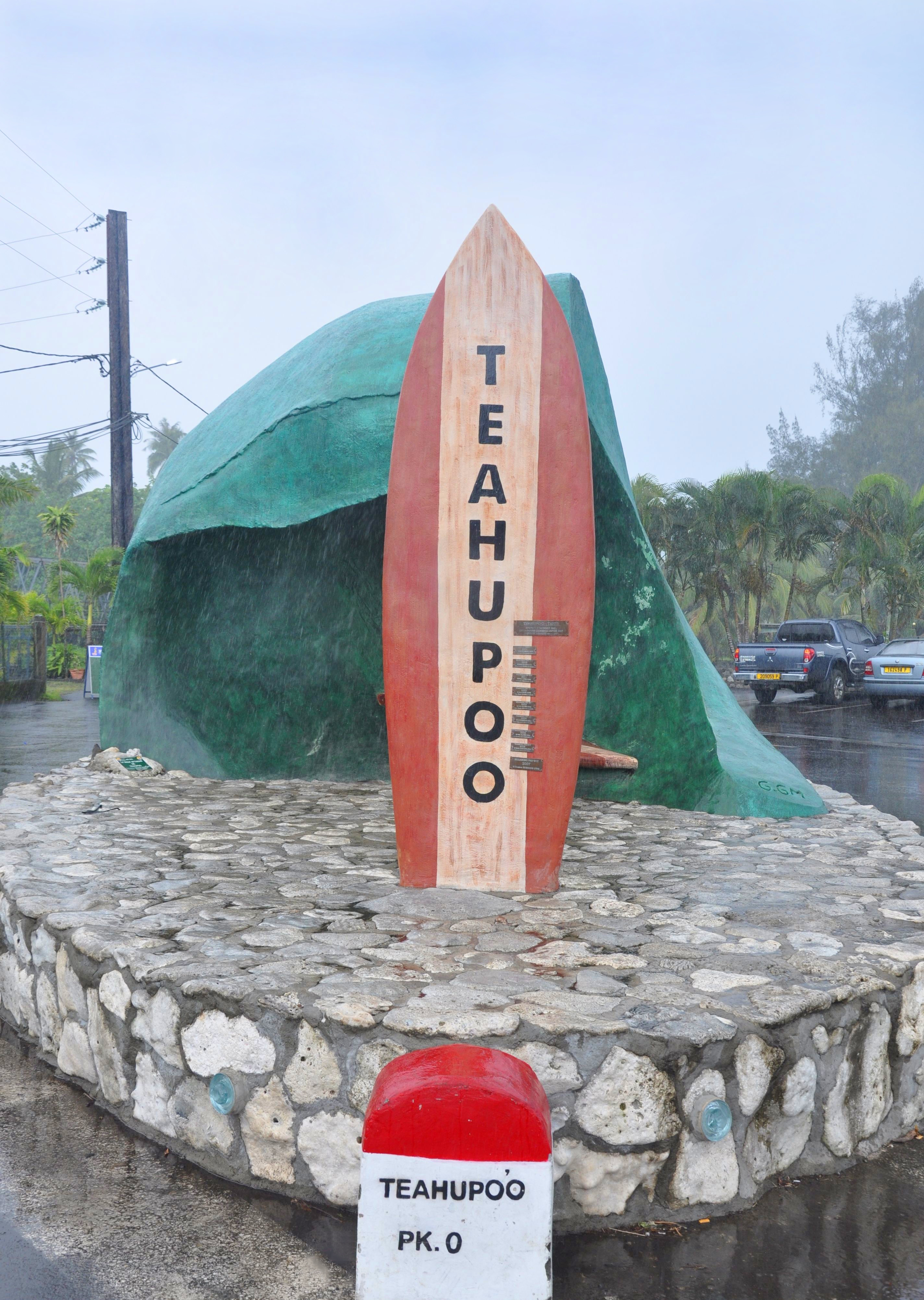

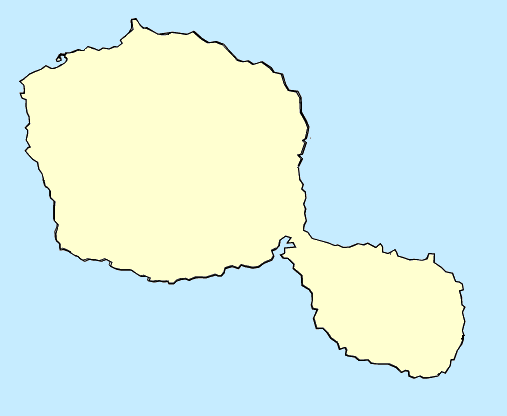
- Location within Tahiti
- Location of Teahupoʻo
- Coordinates: 17°50′50″S 149°16′2″W
- Country: France
- Overseas collectivity: French Polynesia
- Commune: Taiarapu-Ouest
- Population (2022): 1,455
- Time zone: UTC−10:00
- Postal code: 98723

Teahupoʻo (Tahitian pronunciation: [te.a.hu.ˈpo.ʔo]) is a village on the southeastern coast of the island of Tahiti in French Polynesia, France, in the southern Pacific Ocean. It is known for the large, consistent surf that occurs off its shore, and resulting international surfing competitions.

== Village ==
The village of Teahupoʻo has a population of roughly 1,500. The village has a single, one-lane road. The name Teahupoʻo loosely translates from Tahitian to English as "to sever the head" or "place of skulls", in reference to a battle that once took place in the village. The village's population has been significantly affected by radioactivity generated in a 1974 French test of a nuclear bomb.

== Geography ==
Teahupoʻo has a reputation for surfing, partly due to its unique form. An extremely shallow coral reef, which ranges up to 20 inches (51 cm) beneath the water's surface, is responsible for a very hollow-breaking wave. The wave's unique shape, with an effect of almost breaking below sea level, is due to the shape of the reef beneath the wave. This is semi-circular, and drops down sharply, creating a 'below water' effect; the extreme angles in descent create an instant instability to the wave. A steep wall of reef causes the entire mass to fold onto a scalloped semi circle breaking arc. The wave bends and races along into a dry reef closeout and the lip of the wave is often as thick as it is tall.

Teahupoʻo has been included on lists of "deadliest" and "heaviest" waves due to the combination of extremely large waves with a very shallow reef.

== Surfing history ==
Tahitian Thierry Vernaudon and a few other locals surfed Teahupoʻo for the first time in 1985. Bodyboarding pioneers Mike Stewart and Ben Severson showcased the spot and it soon became an underground spot for thrill-seeking bodyboarders. In the 1990s, surfing videos featuring professionals like Kelly Slater and Tom Carroll made the village popular among surfers. Teahupoʻo has been the site of the Billabong Pro Teahupoo since 1999.

On 17 August 2000, Laird Hamilton is credited with surfing the "heaviest wave" ever ridden, now referred to as the "Millenium Wave". Tahitian surfer Brice Taerea was killed at Teahupoʻo in 2000. He attempted to duck-dive a dangerous 12-foot (3.7-meter) wave but was thrown over the falls and landed headfirst on the reef. He was recovered from the water but died in hospital, having suffered two broken cervical vertebrae and a severed spinal cord.

In 2003 Malik Joyeux successfully rode one of the largest waves ever ridden. Nathan Florence, younger brother of three-time World Surf League champion John John Florence, caught in May 2015 what has been described as the biggest wave ever successfully paddled in Teahupoʻo. Keala Kennelly was the first woman to tow-surf Teahupoʻo in May 2005, getting a 10-foot barrel ahead of the Billabong Tahiti Pro contest.

=== 2024 Summer Olympics ===
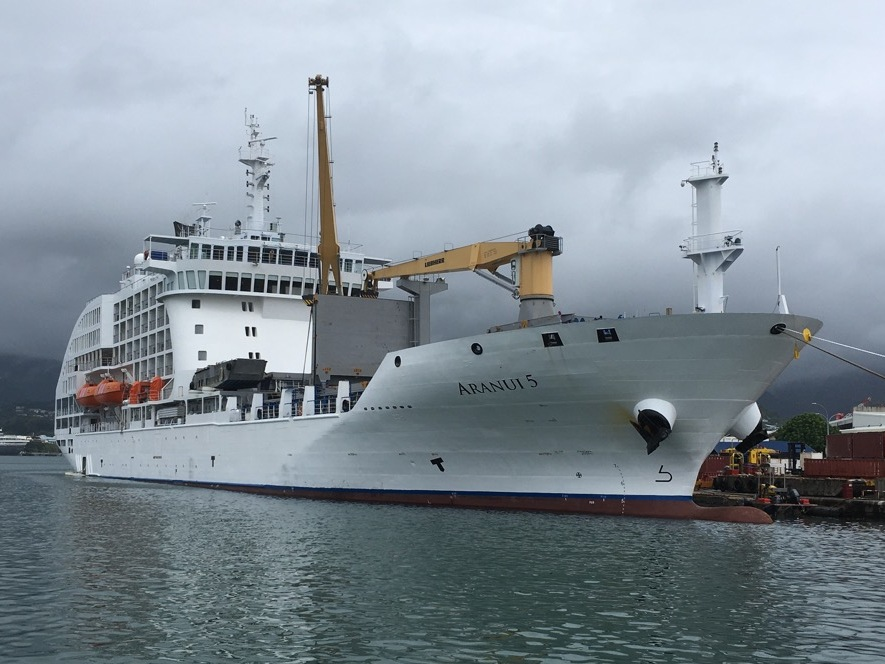
The Aranui 5 ship housed surfers off the coast of Teahupoʻo during the 2024 Summer Olympics.

Teahupoʻo was the host venue for the surfing competition at the 2024 Summer Olympics, which were otherwise mainly hosted in Paris. The venue was 9,800 mi (15,800 km) from Paris, the furthest distance between an Olympics venue and the host city. This was in keeping with International Olympic Committee goals of reducing construction costs by allowing for usage of existing venues, but increased travel costs and emissions. Previously, the record for the longest distance between a host city and a competition venue was 9,700 mi (15,600 km) when, due to Australian quarantine regulations during the Melbourne 1956 games, the equestrian tournament was held in Stockholm.

Several infrastructural improvements were made in preparation for the event. Residents of Teahupoʻo protested against the construction of a three-story aluminium judging tower (replacing an older wooden tower), fearing that the construction would irreversibly damage the coral reef. Construction also damaged coral near the contest site. In response, French Polynesian president Moetai Brotherson said the event could be moved to Taharuu, on Tahiti's west coast. However, this proposal was rejected by organizers. The tower was eventually built, but with changes to the design to reduce impact. Similarly, plans originally called for construction of housing for athletes, but to reduce long-term impact to the village, athlete housing was instead put on the Aranui 5 passenger-cargo ship offshore.

== See also ==
- Big wave surfing
