= List of surfing events =

This is an incomplete list of surfing events and competitions:

Event	Site	Country	Est.	Ended	Notes
ASP World Tour					
Association of Surfing Professionals	Coolangatta	Australia	1982		
Australian Boardriders Battle	Cronulla Beach	Australia	2014		
Australian Open of Surfing	Manly Beach	Australia	2012		
Bells Beach Surf Classic	Bells Beach, Victoria	Australia	1973		
Billabong Pipeline Masters	Banzai Pipeline, Oahu, Hawaii	United States	1970		Part of the Triple Crown of Surfing
Billabong Pro Jeffreys Bay	Jeffreys Bay, Eastern Cape	South Africa			
Billabong Pro Teahupoo	Teahupo'o, Taiarapu	Tahiti			
Copa Movistar	San Bartolo, Lima	Peru			
Duke Kahanamoku Invitational Surfing Championship	Sunset Beach on the North Shore of Oʻahu, Hawaii	United States	1965	1985	Replaced by the Billabong Pro
East Coast Surfing Championships	Virginia Beach, Virginia	United States	1963		
International Surf Festival	Southbay beach area of Los Angeles in Manhattan Beach, Hermosa Beach, Redondo, Torrance, California	United States	1961		
ISA World Junior Surfing Games Ecuador	Salinas	Ecuador			
Ku Ikaika Challenge	Makaha Beach, Mākaha, Hawai'i, Oahu	United States	2008		
Lion Foundation Surf League		New Zealand			
Noosa Festival of Surfing	Noosa, Queensland	Australia	1992		
O'Neill Sebastian Inlet Pro	Space Coast, Florida	United States			
O'Neill World Cup of Surfing	Sunset Beach, Hawaii	United States			Bodysurfing. Part of the Triple Crown of Surfing
Pipeline Bodysurfing Classic	Oahu, Hawaii	United States	1971		
Quiksilver Big Wave Invitational	Waimea Bay, Oahu, Hawaii	United States	1984		
Quiksilver Pro France	Hossegor, Seignosse	France			
Quiksilver Pro Gold Coast	Coolangatta	Australia	2004		
Red Bull Big Wave Africa	"Dungeons", Hout Bay, Cape Town, Western Cape	South Africa	2007		
Red Bull Cape Fear	southern side of the Botany Bay at Cape Solander. Known locally as 'Ours'	Australia	2014		
Reef Hawaiian Pro	Oahu, Hawaii	United States			Part of the Triple Crown of Surfing
Rip Curl Pro	Torquay, Victoria	Australia			Formerly the Bells Beach Surf Classic
Shark Island Challenge	Cronulla, New South Wales	Australia	1997		
Smirnoff World Pro-Am Surfing Championships					
Stubbies	Burleigh Heads, Queensland	Australia	1977	1988	
Surfabout	Sydney	Australia	1974	1991	
Surfest	Newcastle, New South Wales	Australia	1985		
Surfing Hainan Open	Hainan Province	China	2008		
Triple Crown of Surfing					
U.S. Open of Surfing	Huntington Beach, California	United States	1959		
World Qualification Series	Various sites		1992		2009 edition
