= Hawaiian: The Legend of Eddie Aikau =

American TV documentary

- Directed by: Sam George
- Narrated by: Josh Brolin
- Theme music composer: Chris Hayzel; Phil Hernandez; Chris Maxwell; Patrick Seymour
- Country of origin: United States
- Original language: English

Production
- Executive producers: Josh Brolin; Susan Cooper; Bob McKnight; John Dahl; Connor Schell; Bill Simmons
- Producers: Stacy Peralta, Paul Taublieb, Agi Orsi
- Cinematography: Pat Darrin, Chris Zamoscianyk
- Editor: Joshua Altman
- Running time: 1 hour 26 minutes

Original release
- Network: ESPN
- Release: October 1, 2013

Hawaiian: The Legend of Eddie Aikau is a 2013 sports documentary film directed by Sam George. It was co-produced by ESPN, Taublieb Films, and Peralta Productions for ESPN's 30 for 30 series. The film premiered at the Tribeca Film Festival in spring 2013 and on ESPN on October 1, 2013.

The documentary chronicles the life of Hawaiian surfer Eddie Aikau, who in the late 1960s and 1970s was a groundbreaking lifeguard and championship big wave surfer on the island of Oʻahu, and who died in 1978 attempting to save his crewmates when a Polynesian voyaging canoe they were sailing capsized. The film also explores the intertwining of Hawaiian surfing, culture, and identity.

== Background ==
In 2011, producer Stacy Peralta approached filmmaker Sam George about the possibility of telling the story of Eddie Aikau. George, a former professional surfer himself, had started surfing as a boy in Hawaii in the late 1960s when Aikau achieved fame there. George said that by coincidence he was also possibly the last surfer to see Aikau alive, because in 1978 he and his brother had been surfing at Waikīkī on March 16, when Aikau's ill-fated vessel, the Hōkūleʻa, left the harbor. Having heard that Aikau was aboard, they waved to him, giving him a "surfer’s send-off". They were then shocked two days later to hear that Aikau had been lost at sea. George said that, in part because of these connections, he jumped at the chance to make a film about Aikau.

Josh Brolin was asked to narrate the film because George had met him in the early 1980s when the surf shop where George worked in Santa Barbara had sponsored the young Brolin as an up-and-coming surfer. Thirty years later George bumped in to Brolin while surfing at Malibu, realized he would be an ideal narrator for the film, and Brolin agreed.

The film used reenactments in part, particularly in depicting the fate of the Hōkūleʻa, in that some important parts of Aikau's life had never been captured on film.

== Primary interview subjects ==
In order of appearance

- Clyde Aikau (surfer and brother of Eddie Aikau)
- Myra Aikau (sister)
- Sol Aikau (brother)
- Jonathan Osorio (Professor, Hawaiian School of Knowledge, University of Hawaii)
- Greg Noll (former surfer)
- Isaiah Walker (Professor of History, Brigham Young University of Hawaii)
- Ricky Grigg (former surfer)
- Matt Warshaw (former surfer, writer)
- Ben Aipa (former surfer)
- Kimo Hollinger (former surfer)
- Fred Hemmings (former surfer, Hawaii state Senator and Representative)
- Nainoa Thompson (navigator and president of the Polynesian Voyaging Society)
- Reno Abellira (former surfer)
- Linda Ipsen (Crosswhite) (Eddie's wife)
- Brian Keaulana (former surfer, lifeguard)
- Ken Bradshaw (former surfer)
- Jeff Hakman (former surfer)
- Shaun Tomson (former surfer)
- Wayne 'Rabbit' Bartholomew (former surfer)
- Marion Lyman-Mersereau (member of 1978 Hōkūleʻa crew)

== Synopsis ==
Narrated by Josh Brolin, who himself was a competitive surfer in the 1980s, the film begins by relating Eddie Aikau's early years and the evolution of Hawaiian surfing on Oʻahu. Aikau moved with his family to Oʻahu from Maui at the age of 13 in 1959, and as a boy developed a special love of surfing. One of six children, he and his younger brother Clyde were the most devoted surfers in the family, and spent much of their free time surfing on plywood boogie boards at a stretch called "Walls" Beach near Waikīkī, where a concrete pier and wall extend into the ocean. Surfing the walls area was a rite of passage for local boys and Clyde Aikau said Eddie quickly became "the King of the Walls". At about age 14 or 15 the Aikau boys discovered real surfboards.

At the same time, the film interweaves the story of Hawaii's development: the overthrow of the Hawaiian monarchy at the end of the 19th century, the absorption into the US as a Territory shortly thereafter, the influence of the sugar industry and other non-native corporations, and eventual statehood in 1959. After statehood, there was a surge of hotel and resort development which led to the enormous growth of Waikīkī as a tourist destination, but at the same time a sense of cultural marginalization by some Hawaiians. And while "haoles" (whites) from California or other places were ubiquitous at early surfing competitions, surfing remained a uniquely Hawaiian sport and point of pride.

Aikau dropped out of school in the 11th grade and began working nights at the Dole pineapple plant and surfed during the day. In 1965 the first big wave surfing competition was held on the island's North Shore, where the biggest waves could be found. The competition was called the Duke Kahanamoku Invitational Surfing Championship after the renowned Hawaiian swim champion and surfer Duke Kahanamoku. Despite the competition being held in honor of a Hawaiian hero, the competitors were almost exclusively white. Although not invited, Eddie Aikau and fellow Hawaiian surfer Ben Aipa went out and surfed anyway at the time of the competition. The following year they were both invited to compete, and Aikau finished sixth.

The film mixes archival footage of Aikau and others surfing and clips of interviews with his peers of the time. The surfing scenes are often of some of the best competitors in the world riding some of the biggest waves in the world. Even in his early years it was clear Aikau had a special style. As Matt Warshaw put it, "In a situation where every other surfer in the world would have jumped off or at the very least tensed up, he couldn't have been more at ease on these gigantic waves. He looked like the perfect big wave surfer."

In the late 1960s and early 1970s, the national media began to discover North Shore surfing, and Aikau and others were made famous by shows such as ABC's Wide World of Sports. Aikau suddenly became well-known on the island. By the early 1970s the North Shore was the site for many major tournaments: "The Duke", the Pipeline Masters, the Hang Ten, the Smirnoff Pro-Am, and others.

In 1967 Aikau was hired as the first lifeguard ever at Waimea Bay on the North Shore, which had some of the biggest and most dangerous waves on the island. The bay was a popular spot for soldiers on leave from Vietnam, who would regularly get drunk and get in trouble in the surf. As a regular surfer there, Aikau had already accomplished a number of rescues even before being hired. Aikau became famous for the saves he made there and is credited with 500 in his time as a lifeguard. One interviewee described him as "a protector. It was a role he picked for himself and he was good at it."

The film pays homage as well to the Hawaiian sense of "ohana" (family), in its descriptions of the Aikau family frequent gatherings, parties, luaus, music, and welcoming nature.

The film chronicles his personal life as well through interviews. In 1970 Aikau met a young woman visiting from Seattle named Linda Crosswhite, and a year later they married. The Aikau family was struck with tragedy when Eddie's brother Gerald, who had served in Vietnam, was killed in a car accident on the North Shore in 1973. Clyde Aikau recounts how the incident had occurred just days after Eddie and Gerald had "had a small spat". However, Gerald's death struck Eddie hard. He fell into depression and would spend the night sleeping at his brother's grave at the Punchbowl military cemetery. His wife Linda later separated from him. "There was a wall of grief I couldn't get over," she said.

The film details the developments of surfing in Hawaii over the decade of the 70s as it intersected Eddie's life: Clyde Aikau winning The Duke in 1973 before Eddie, an "invasion" of brash white Australians, and the racial and colonialism-tinged tensions that engendered, the respected Eddie Aikau acting as peacemaker, and Eddie finally winning The Duke, the most important event to him and native Hawaiians, in 1977 at the age of 31, old for a pro surfer.

In 1978 Aikau was selected, out of several thousand applicants, as a crew member for a trip of the Polynesia voyaging canoe Hōkūleʻa. The Hōkūleʻa was a 62 ft (19 m) double-hulled voyaging canoe which used traditional navigation methods without modern instrumentation, to demonstrate the ability of ancient Polynesians to undertake purposeful long distance ocean voyages. The vessel had already made successful voyages in previous years. In 1978 the trip planned was a 5,000 mile round-trip route from Hawaii to Tahiti. The Hōkūleʻa was seen as a symbol of hope and pride of Hawaiian culture. On the afternoon of March 16, 1978, the Hōkūleʻa left Ala Wai Harbor. The vessel almost immediately encountered heavy seas, and five hours later foundered and capsized. Being without communication and without means of propulsion, the crew spent a night at sea hanging on to the overturned vessel. The next morning Aikau volunteered to paddle a surfboard the roughly 12 miles to the nearest island Lānaʻi, and set off. Roughly nine hours after that, flares set off by the crew were seen by a passing aircraft and they were rescued that night. However Aikau had not arrived at Lānaʻi. The largest land-sea rescue effort ever staged in the history of Hawaii was launched, but he was never found. A week later Aikau's father told the teams still searching to stop and "let him go."

Aikau is memorialized with the Eddie Aikau Big Wave Invitational surf competition held at Waimea Bay, which began in 1985 and continues to this day. "The Eddie", as it is known, celebrates Hawaiian culture and tradition, and is considered one of the most prestigious and respected surf events in the world.

== Critical reception ==
In 2014 the film won an Emmy for Best Sports Documentary Series during the 35th Annual Emmy Awards. It is one of the few surfing-related films to ever win an Emmy.

The film also won Best Picture and Best Director awards at the 2013 Malibu International Film Festival and Best Picture, Best Documentary, and Audience Favorite at the 2013 Maui Film Festival.

Chris Dixon, writing for theinertia.com, said it was "one of the top five surfing-centered documentaries of all time". Dixon wrote that "Only someone [Sam George] who has spent years immersed in surfing on film, in print, and in the ebullient Mr. George’s case; in front of anyone he’s standing in a room with, could have pulled this film off. Eddie’s siblings, friends, and colleagues clearly trusted George" to open up about topics that were at times painful: Eddie's conflicts or problems or the erosion of Hawaiian culture under European/US colonialism.

Justin Housman, writing for surfer.com, said that Sam George directed "a documentary masterpiece." The site surfertoday.com wrote that "the movie is a compelling exploration of the tragic decline and extraordinary re-birth of the Hawaiian culture as personified by a native son." The Tribeca Film Festival described the film as 'a compelling allegory for the reclaiming of Hawaiian culture."

Kevin McFarland, writing for avclub.com, gave the film a more nuanced review, writing that the attempt to "paint Aikau in the best possible light" gave short shrift to some aspects of his life, such as his marriage. However, he still wrote that the film "illuminates a naturally intriguing bit of surfing history."

== See also ==
- 30 for 30
- List of 30 for 30 films
