= International Professional Surfers =

International professional surfing organization

The International Professional Surfing (IPS) organization was the original world governing body of professional surfing that existed between 1976 and 1982. The IPS brought together a loose affiliation of surf contests around the world by forming one world circuit.

== History ==
The IPS was formed by Fred Hemmings and Randy Rarick in October 1976. Hemmings contacted directors of the major events in the world and formed the circuit, Peter Burness of South Africa, Bill Bolman of Australia and Kevin Sieter of California were instrumental in the early success of the pro surfing world circuit.

A women's division was added in 1977, administered by athlete turned organizer Patti Paniccia, with Margo Oberg being the first IPS Women's World Champion. Two important IPS developments were the introduction of the man-on-man format in 1977 and the addition of California to the tour schedule in 1981.

In 1982, the self-described "Bronze Aussies," Peter Townend and Ian Cairns, saw an opportunity to take over the IPS in order to form their own business, and their criticism of the organization initiated its demise. In January 1983 Ian Cairns launched the Association of Surfing Professionals (ASP) and lured world circuit organizers to his organization. The IPS and Hemmings were effectively pushed aside and left to operate only his Hawaiian pro events. Hemmings and Randy Rarick incorporated the famous Triple Crown Surfing events. In December 1984 the IPS-controlled Pipeline Masters received an ASP sanction as a specialty event.

== World Champions Men's ==
- 1976 Peter Townend;
- 1977 Shaun Tomson;
- 1978 Wayne Bartholomew;
- 1979 Mark Richards;
- 1980 Mark Richards;
- 1981 Mark Richards;
- 1982 Mark Richards.

== World Champions Women's ==
- 1977 Margo Oberg;
- 1978 Lynne Boyer;
- 1979 Lynne Boyer;
- 1980 Margo Oberg;
- 1981 Margo Oberg;
- 1982 Debbie Beacham.
- 2009 Marna Odendal

== See also ==
- SurfAid International
