= Blears =

Blears is a surname. Notable people with the surname include:

- Brian Blears (1933–2005), Welsh footballer
- Hazel Blears (born 1956), British politician
- Laura Lee Ching (née Blears; born 1951), American surfer
- Lord James Blears (1923–2016), British-American wrestler, ring announcer, promoter, actor, and surfer
- Jimmy Blears (1948–2011), American surfer
