= Stubbies (surfing) =

Annual surf competition held in Queensland, Australia

The Stubbies was a surf competition held annually, in about March, at Burleigh Heads, Queensland from 1977 to 1988. The event was named after its sponsor the Stubbies clothing brand and was one of the three major Australian surfing competitions of its day (the other two being the Bells Beach Classic and Surfabout).

== History ==
The contest was established in 1977, organised that year by surfer Peter Drouyn. He devised for it the "man on man" heat system where just two surfers competed in each heat (where before four or even six was normal). Prior to 1977, man on man surfing was devised and successfully conducted by kneeboarders under the direction of Peter Ware and Peter Berry. Maroubra was the site of the annual Sitmar Cruises event. The man-on-man system is still used in ASP World Tour contests today.

== Winners ==
Year	Winner
1977	Michael Peterson
1978	Wayne "Rabbit" Bartholomew
1979	Mark Richards
1980	Peter Harris
1981	Mark Richards
1983	Martin Potter
1984	Tom Carroll
1986	Tom Curren
