= Bustin' Down the Door =

- Promotional Poster
- Directed by: Jeremy Gosch
- Written by: Jeremy Gosch; Monika Gosch; Phil Jarratt; Robert Traill
- Produced by: Monika Gosch; Robart Traill; Shaun Tomson
- Starring: Wayne Bartholomew; Ian Cairns; Mark Richards; Shaun Tomson; Michael Tomson; Peter Townend
- Narrated by: Edward Norton
- Music by: Stuart Michael Thomas
- Release date: July 25, 2008
- Running time: 95 minutes
- Language: English

Bustin' Down The Door is a 2008 documentary film chronicling the rise of professional surfing in the early 1970s. The film follows a group of young surfers from Australia and South Africa, including Shaun Tomson, Wayne 'Rabbit' Bartholomew, Ian Cairns, Mark Richards, Michael Tomson and Peter Townend, as they relocate to Hawaii encountering obstacles, turf wars and massive wipeouts along the way. Clashes with the locals, some of whom find the newcomers' bravado to be insulting to Hawaiian culture, eventually culminate in death threats against the subjects of the film.

== Soundtrack ==
The soundtrack includes music by David Bowie, The Stooges, Eels, Leonard Cohen and Them Terribles. The Original Score was composed by Stuart Michael Thomas

== Reviews ==
Variety gave the movie a positive review saying, the picture "is certain to rank alongside Step Into Liquid, Riding Giants and Five Summer Stories in the primo category of surf movies that rip onscreen and tell a great story". Shannon Kelley Gould of the Santa Barbara Independent writes that the picture "Delivered on all sorts of levels. Not just a great surf movie, but a GREAT movie."

Kelly Slater called it "A breakout film. Bustin' Down the Door shows what happens during the most critical period in our sport's history when ego and historical problems clash."

== See also ==
- Bustin' Down the Door is also the title of a 1996 biography of Rabbit Bartholomew by Tim Baker.
