= Peter Harris (surfer) =

Australian surfer and shaper

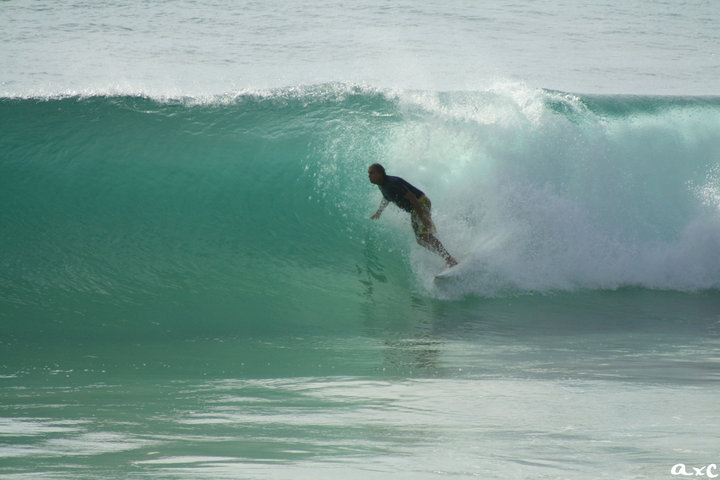
Peter Harris, Burleigh Point

Peter Harris (born 1958) is a surfer/shaper from Burleigh Heads, Queensland, Australia.

Harris was taught to shape by Michael Peterson and Dick Van Straalen in the 1970s and later became the first "rookie" to win a major international surfing event by winning the 1980 Stubbies at Burleigh Heads.
