= Blink of an Eye (film) =

2019 film

- Theatrical release poster
- Directed by: Paul Taublieb
- Produced by: Mitch Covington; Susan Cooper; Pam Miller
- Starring: Michael Waltrip; Dale Earnhardt Jr.; Darrell Waltrip; Richard Petty
- Distributed by: Fathom Events
- Release date: September 12, 2019 (United States)
- Running time: 88 minutes
- Country: United States
- Language: English
- Box office: $201,874

Blink of an Eye is a 2019 American documentary film that depicts the career of NASCAR driver Michael Waltrip, culminating with his win in the 2001 Daytona 500 which also saw his car owner and friend Dale Earnhardt killed in an accident. The film was produced, written, and directed by Paul Taublieb, and was distributed by 1091 Media through Fathom Events, premiering in theaters for a one-night showing on September 12, 2019.

== Synopsis ==
The film tells the story of Waltrip's racing career from its beginning, showing him work his way up to NASCAR by winning in go-karts and lower divisions of racing. Waltrip's career in the then NASCAR Winston Cup Series begins when he receives advice from Richard Petty to start racing directly in Winston Cup rather than going through the developmental NASCAR Busch Series (now known as the Xfinity Series) first. His early career is largely overshadowed by his older brother Darrell's; unlike Darrell, Michael has minimal success in the Winston Cup Series, failing to win a single race in his first 462 Winston Cup Series starts.

After a frightening accident at Bristol Motor Speedway, Waltrip befriends seven-time NASCAR Winston Cup Series Champion Dale Earnhardt. In 2000, he agrees to drive a new third car for Earnhardt's Winston Cup Series team, Dale Earnhardt, Inc. (DEI) for 2001. The move makes Waltrip and Earnhardt's son, Dale Earnhardt Jr., teammates. In his first race for DEI, Waltrip, Earnhardt Jr., and Earnhardt are running in the top three in the 2001 Daytona 500. While Waltrip leads Earnhardt Jr. to a one-two finish, Earnhardt is involved in a fatal accident with Ken Schrader on the final lap. Schrader visits Waltrip in Victory Lane to explain the severity of Earnhardt's injuries, shortly before his death is confirmed to the public.

NASCAR returns to Daytona that summer for the 2001 Pepsi 400. In the closing laps, Earnhardt Jr. and Waltrip find themselves running one-two in that order. Despite badly wanting a win to help in the healing process, Waltrip instead chooses to push Earnhardt Jr. to the victory just as Earnhardt Jr. had pushed him to his Daytona 500 win earlier that year. The two celebrate Earnhardt Jr.'s victory together in a moment of healing for the entire NASCAR community.

== Production ==
In 2011, Waltrip released a book entitled In the Blink of an Eye. The film is an adaptation of the book. Taublieb Films announced the film on May 17, 2019, with Paul Taublieb producing and directing it. 1091 Media acquired the distribution rights to Blink of an Eye on May 22. Monster Energy also provided support for the film with their Vice President of Sports Marketing Mitch Covington serving as a producer. "It's a story for the ages," Covington said, "and myself and the company are thrilled to support and help bring it to life, and we're all fortunate to have a talent like Taublieb helming the project." NASCAR President Steve Phelps also served as an executive producer.

== Release ==
The film was given a private screening on May 24, 2019, at the NASCAR Hall of Fame theater in Charlotte, North Carolina. It was officially released to the public on September 12, showing at theaters only that one night.

=== Home media ===
On November 5, 2019, the film was made available on digital download and rental platforms. The Apple iTunes version contained deleted scenes, a 1990 interview with Earnhardt Sr., and a music video for Bobby Capps' song "In the Blink of an Eye," which was written by Covington for the documentary. On December 3, Blu-ray Disc and DVD versions were released. The film became available through streaming exclusively on the Motor Trend app on February 3, 2020. Fox Sports 1 aired the documentary for the first time on March 13, 2021.

== Reception ==
=== Critical response ===
On Rotten Tomatoes the film has an approval rating of 67% based on nine reviews, with an average rating of 5.3/10. On Metacritic it has a score of 58% based on reviews from 6 critics, indicating "mixed or average" reviews.

Writing for The New York Times, Glenn Kenny stated, "Taublieb's approach is straightforward, but also a little pedestrian. One kind of hopes to see a revved-up fictional version of this tale onscreen someday. Is that wrong?" Racer's Eric Johnson called the film "NASCAR's answer to Senna," saying, "The pure emotion and remembrance that reverberates through the movie is classic human element stuff, and enough to enthrall anyone, be it a hardcore Cup fan or an outsider with a spare hour and a half on their hands."

The Hollywood Reporter's Frank Scheck wrote that the film, "will naturally hold its biggest appeal for racing buffs but may also prove appealing to nonfans thanks to the moving story at its core." Variety's Nick Schager said that "missteps are relatively rare, as Taublieb by and large lets his material speak for itself, culminating with a post-tragedy Daytona race that ended in astoundingly perfect fashion — and is sure to stir even the most NASCAR-indifferent heart." Michael Rechtshaffen of the Los Angeles Times called the film "a solidly assembled documentary portrait" of the events, adding that it "movingly negotiates those emotional hairpin turns with adept precision."
