= WQ =

WQ or Wq may refer to:

- Wq number, in Alfred Wotquenne's catalogue of C. P. E. Bach's music
- Wake Island, a U.S. overseas territory
- Water quality
- Wiscasset and Quebec Railroad, Maine, U.S.
- Wikiquote, an online quotation dictionary

== See also ==
- "World Qualification Series"/"World Qualifying Series" (WQS) in international surfing competition; see List of surfing events
