= Mākaha Beach Park =

Park in Mākaha, Hawaii, US

Coordinates: 21.4770°N 158.2210°W

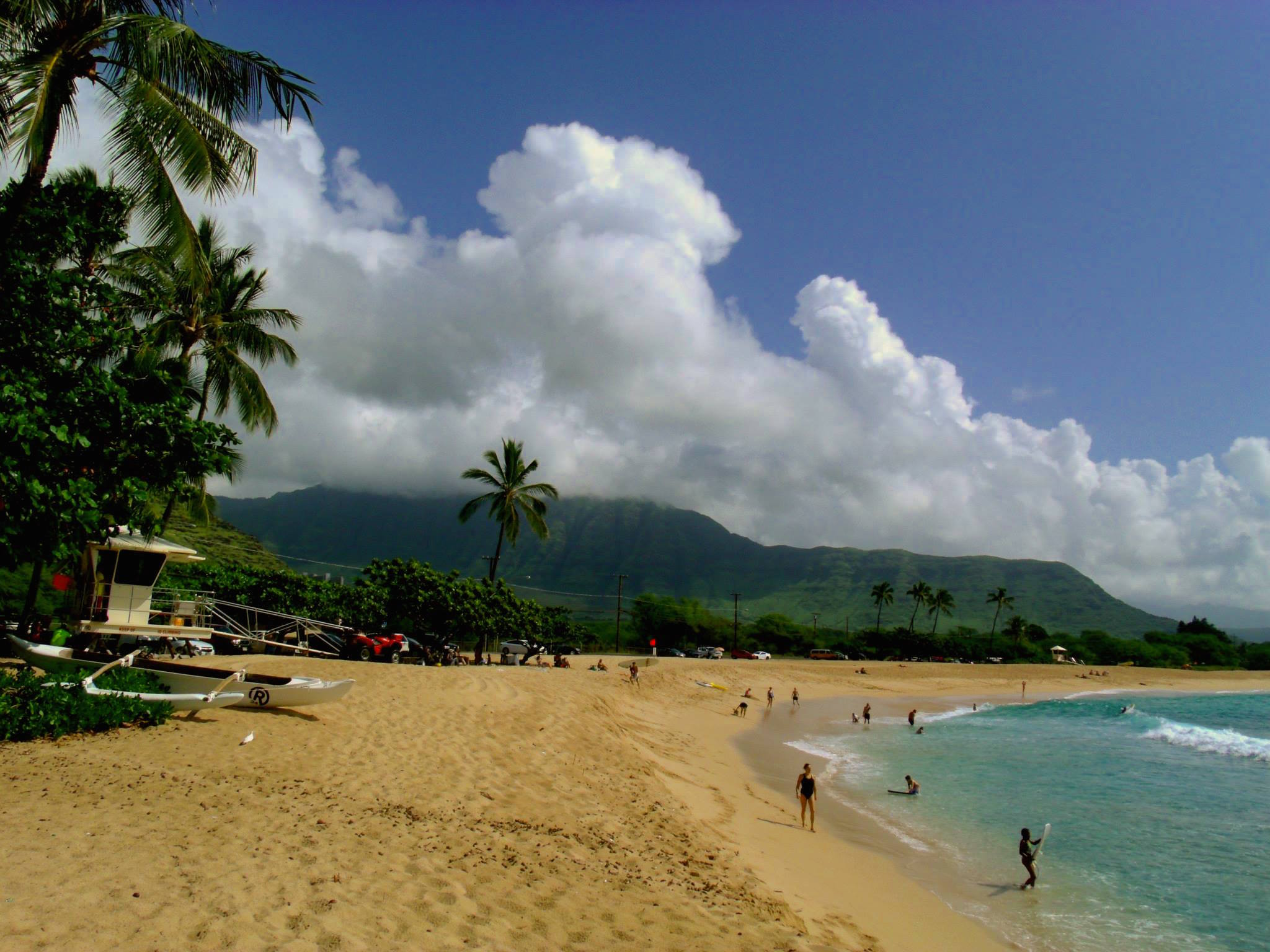
Mākaha Beach Park on January 13, 2014.

Mākaha Beach Park is a white sand beach in Mākaha, Hawaii, the neighbor of the beaches southeast of Ka‘ena Point such as Yokohama Bay (Keawa‘ula Beach) and Mākua Beach.
