= The Lost Wave =

- Directed by: Sam George
- Written by: Sam George; Sam Boyer
- Produced by: Paul Taublieb
- Narrated by: Sal Masekela
- Release date: 15 April 2007
- Running time: 59 minutes
- Country: São Tomé and Príncipe
- Language: English

The Lost Wave: An African Surf Story is a 2007 São Tomé and Príncipe documentary film directed by Sam George.

== Synopsis ==
Writer/surfer Sam George and professional surfers Holly Beck and Joe Curren travel to the remote island of São Tomé off the coast of West Africa, part of São Tomé and Príncipe. They document the indigenous surfing culture. Known as "corre-barra", it is an indelible part of the island's heritage with a long and uncertain history. As the film crew observed, locals have begun to carve their own surfboards out of wood and surf the waves on their feet.

== Production ==
Sam George first visited São Tomé and Príncipe in 2000, intending to jump-start the surfing culture. To his surprise, it was one of the cradles of surfing, similar to Hawaii. He returned in 2006 to make a film about it. George discovered, with his film crew, that the best performers of "corre-barra" would receive a coveted modern surfboard. The film is narrated by Sal Masekela and features indigenous music. Paul Taublieb of Media X International served as its executive producer, and it was filmed entirely in high definition.

== Release and reception ==
The film had its premiere at the Malibu International Film Festival on 15 April 2007. It received the Best Documentary prize at the Malibu International Film Festival, Most Innovative at the Huntington Beach Film Festival, and was a finalist at the Maui Film Festival and Surfer Poll and Video Awards. Surfer Today called it an "emotional surf documentary."
