= Sam George (surfer) =

American surfer and writer

- Born: 1956
- Occupations: Surfer, writer, director

Sam George is an American former professional surfer, writer, director and screenwriter. He wrote for surfing magazines from 1983-2005. He has written and directed a number of documentary films, including the 2013 film Hawaiian: The Legend of Eddie Aikau, which won an Emmy for Best Sports Documentary Series, as part of ESPN's 30 for 30 series.

== Early life ==
George's father was a U.S. Navy officer and pilot and his mother was an elementary school teacher. George's family moved frequently in his youth and he later attributed his love of travel for surfing to his experiences as a boy. He began to surf at age 11 when his father was stationed in Hawaii. He attended Cal Poly-Obispo in California for about 2 years but left to focus on surfing. He later said "all I wanted to do was go to Australia", because of its surf lore and having a family connection there. He first went to surf there in 1979, where he accidentally met Doug Warbrick, the co-founder of the surfing chain Rip Curl, while hitchhiking.

== Career ==
George was a competitive surfer for several years. In 1978 he was the Western Surfing Association's top ranked men's competitor. In 1983 he became a contributing editor at Surfing magazine in San Clemente, California, later becoming the magazine's senior editor. His monthly column "Caught Inside" ran until 1990, when he left Surfing and began work at Surfer magazine. George worked at Surfer from 1990 to 1998, when he left the magazine to work on a book project and to help start and edit a free tabloid called SurfNews. He returned to Surfer as executive editor in 2000, a position he held until 2005, when he left the magazine to concentrate on documentary film projects.

George has traveled extensively throughout his career, recounting that he has surfed 695 locations in 42 countries. He is credited with the discovery of new surf breaks in West Africa, the Andaman Islands and Madeira. In 2007, George directed the documentary The Lost Wave, about his discovery of an indigenous surfing tradition in São Tomé and Príncipe. In 2013 he wrote and directed the documentary Hawaiian: The Legend of Eddie Aikau, about the Hawaiian surfer Eddie Aikau, as part of ESPN's 30 for 30 series. In 2014 the film won an Emmy Award for Best Sports Documentary Series.

George has published seven books. The most recent was a memoir published in 2025 entitled Child of Storms: A Surfing Memoir in Progress.

== Personal life ==
George was married to singer and actress Nia Peeples from 2007 to 2015. His brother Matt has also been a long-time contributing writer to surfing magazines and wrote a book on the sport in 2023.

George lived in Malibu, California for many years, and currently lives on Whidbey Island, Washington.

== Filmography ==
- Writer, Riding Giants (2004) directed by Stacy Peralta
- Writer/director, The Lost Wave (2007)
- Writer, Crips and Bloods: Made in America (2008)
- Co-Director and Writer, Hollywood Don't Surf! (2010)
- Director and Writer, Hawaiian: The Legend of Eddie Aikau (2013)
