= Ian Cairns =

Australian surfer (born 1952)

Personal information
- Born: 24 July 1952 (age 73) Kew, Victoria, Australia

Surfing career
- Sport: Surfing

Surfing specifications
- Stance: Regular (natural foot)

Ian Cairns (born 24 July 1952 in Kew, Victoria) is a former champion surfer who was also influential in establishing the world professional surfing circuit and particularly the World Championship Tour. He was described as "the premier "power" surfer of his era [who] dominated the North Shore during the mid to late-seventies".

Growing up in the Sydney suburb of Avalon where he first learned to surf, Cairns moved to Western Australia with his family in early 1967, to Perth's western suburbs, attending Swanbourne Senior High School. Cairns dominated the surfing scene in his adopted state. From the age of 13 he consistently won every competition on offer, winning state Junior and Open titles. He moved to Hawaii in the early 1970s in search of big waves and before a professional circuit had established. Cairns joined the Australian team at the 1970 and 1972 World Surfing Championships and at Laniakea off Oahu in December 1973 he won the Smirnoff Pro event at Sunset Beach from Hawaiian Jeff Hakman. He won other big events in the Duke Kahanamoku Invitational Surfing Championship in 1975 and World Cup events in 1976 and 1980.

In 1975, Cairns and fellow Australian Peter Townend devised a rating and scoring system for surfing events. In 1979, he moved to California and with Townend formed the National Scholastic Surfing Association (NSSA). In 1983 he became the first director of the Association of Surfing Professionals (ASP) of which he is a life member.

He returned to Australia in 1986 where he farmed at Margaret River, Western Australia. In 1996 he returned to California where he now lives with his wife Alisa Schwarzstein, his son Jonathon (daughter Amy lives in Australia) and twin sons.

Alisa Schwarzstein is a former ASP professional. She was inducted into the Surfing Walk of Fame as that year's Woman of the Year in 2012; the Walk is in Huntington Beach, California.

Cairns is currently Head Coach of the PacSun USA Surf Team.

Cairns was inducted into the Western Australian Hall of Champions in 1990, into the Surfing Walk of Fame at Huntington Beach, California, as a Surf Champion in 2010, and into the Surfers' Hall of Fame, also in 2010. The Western Australian Surfers' and Waveriders' Association awards the Ian Cairns Award to the Western Australian male surfer of the year.

== See also ==
- Shaun Tomson
- Mark Richards
- Bustin Down The Door

Achievements
Preceded by Jimmy Blears	Smirnoff World Pro-Am Surfing Championships World Champion; 1973	Succeeded by Reno Abellira
