= Wayne Bartholomew =

Australian surfer (born 1954)

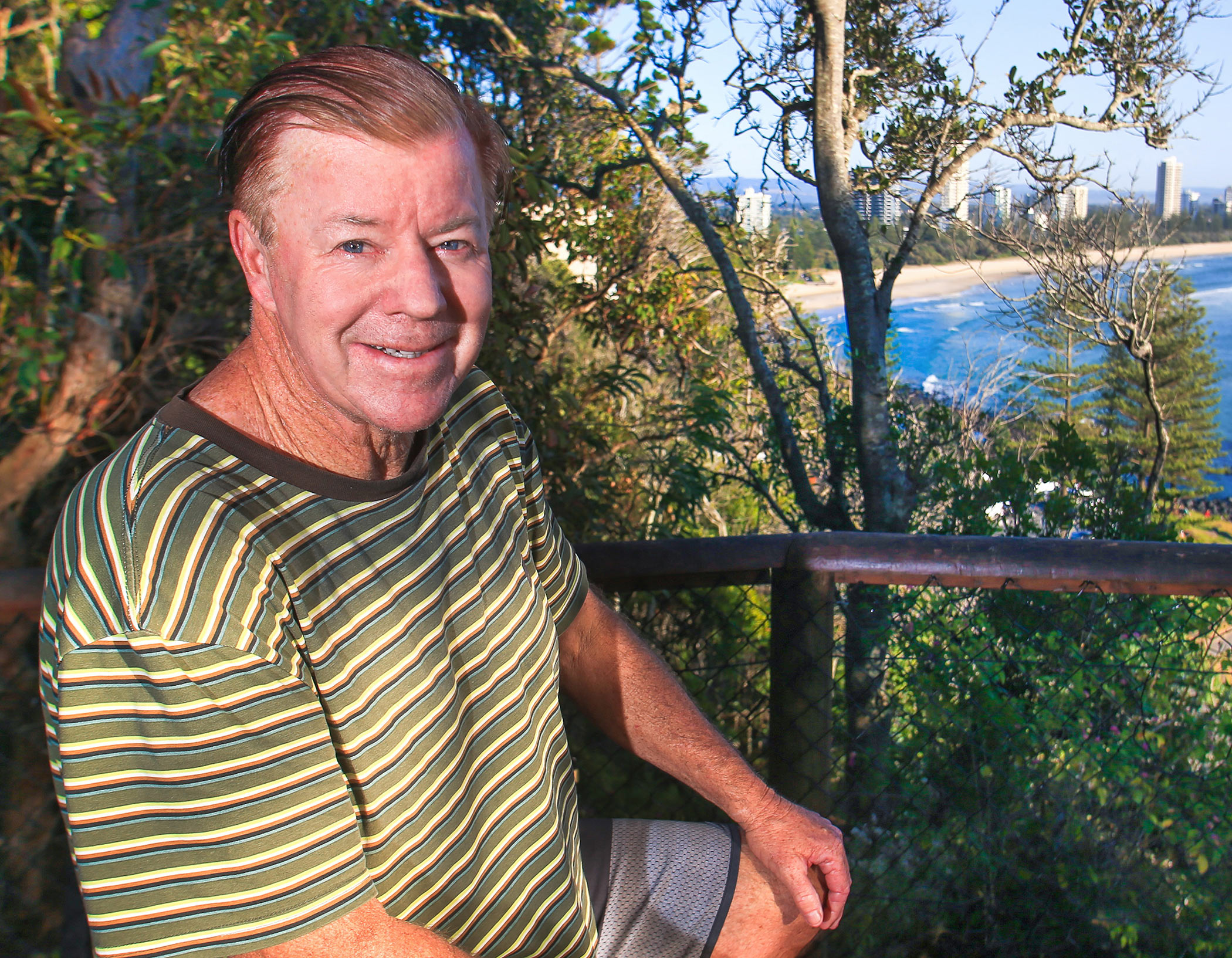
- Wayne Bartholomew sits at the lookout on the headland at Burleigh Heads

Personal information
- Nicknames: Rabbit, Bugs
- Born: Wayne Bartholomew; 30 November 1954 (age 71) Murwillumbah, New South Wales

Surfing career
- Sport: Surfing
- Best year: 1978
- Major achievements: 1978 ASP World Surfing Champion

Surfing specifications
- Stance: Natural
- Favorite waves: Kirra Point, Snapper Rocks, Banzai Pipeline, Burleigh Point
- Favorite maneuvers: Tube Riding

Wayne "Rabbit" Bartholomew AM (born; 30 November 1954) is an Australian world champion surfer, surf sports innovator, community advocate and politician. Bartholomew is the former CEO and president of the Association of Surfing Professionals and the creator of the Dream Tour format of professional competition surfing.

== Surfing career ==
=== Early years ===
Wayne Bartholomew was born 30 November 1954 in the New South Wales township of Murwillumbah to father Donald 'Bart' Bartholomew (dec.) and mother Betty Bartholomew. He grew up in Coolangatta, Queensland, alongside his four sisters Wendy (dec.), Cindy, Heidi, Louise, and two half-sisters Tanya, and Leah. He attended Miami State High School throughout his upbringing.

Bartholomew began surfing at age 13, during the Australian summer of 1967–1968, at his home-town beach Rainbow Bay on the Gold Coast, and the Bay's popular surf break, Snapper Rocks.

His first surfboard was a gift from local surfing brothers Wayne and Robye Deane who had heard of the young Bartholomew and his interest in surfing through their parents' friendship with the Bartholomew family, with both families involved in the local Lions Club. The board was a cut down nine foot six inch 'Ron' longboard that had been reshaped by the Deane brothers who were aspiring carpenters at the time, and re-glassed for $20 at a local factory to produce a new seven foot long board. Once complete, the brothers gave the re-designed board to Bartholomew.

Wayne has often credited his mother for supporting his surfing interests at a time when surfing was considered an outsider's pursuit and surfing's image was controversial.

Early on, Wayne showed a natural talent for surfing which became his daily activity of choice during his later school years, along with any competitive pursuit he could partake in including soccer. Whilst it is often reported that he was given the nickname 'Rabbit' when he was young because of his speed as a soccer player, and his prominent front teeth, it was actually due to his demonstrated hopping style he adopted when famously attempting to play two pinball machines simultaneously at Gill's Cafe, a favourite beachside haunt in his youth years.

As a teenager, Wayne would often surf before, after and occasionally during school hours, perfecting his wave knowledge and tube riding skills on the famed Coolangatta point breaks of Kirra, Greenmount and Snapper Rocks.

Wayne once recounted of his youth surfing days living next to the beachfront at Kirra, "It was a magical existence. We lived in this little cottage 50 metres from the sea. At night my heart would beat to the rhythm of the tide. And in the morning I'd simply climb out of the window and walk into the surf."

=== Professional competition ===
Wayne began surfing at a competition level as a junior in the early 1970s, where he quickly made a name for himself as a fierce competitor and stylish proponent.

His first major title came when he was crowned the Australian School Boy Champion in 1972. He would go on to win multiple Queensland Men's Open titles as a semi professional surfing competitor over the next few years.

In the mid 1970s, Bartholomew, along with fellow Australian Ian Cairns, South African Shaun Tomson and several other Australians, competed in and won surf competitions on the North Shore of Oʻahu in Hawaii. The group embodied a more aggressive and flamboyant style than the low-key style typically practiced by native Hawaiian surfers. Magazine articles by Bartholomew and Cairns, in particular, were viewed as disrespectful by some native Hawaiians, who felt their culture was being mocked. At one point in 1976 Bartholomew was badly beaten up by a group of Hawaiians and the entire group received death threats. The tension was eased by native Hawaiian and local hero Eddie Aikau who called the Australians to a public meeting with locals to make peace.

In 1977, Wayne turned full-time professional and finished second behind South African surfer Shaun Tomson in his rookie year. In that same year, he contested the first Stubbies Surf Classic at Burleigh Heads, regarded as the first man-on-man style surfing event ever contested, but was eliminated from the contest by Michael Peterson in the semi-finals.

Returning to compete in 1978, Wayne dominated the competition on the world tour and secured his first World Surfing Champion title.

Spanning a decade, Bartholomew competed on the world professional surfing tour until 1987, ranking in the top five surfers for seven consecutive years. In his professional surfing years, he was widely considered one of the greatest surfers of the period — famed for his bold attitude, flamboyant style, fearless competitive drive and tactical insight.

=== Post world surfing tour ===
In 1985 Wayne founded the Wayne Bartholomew Academy of Surfing, a pioneering surfing school and frontrunner to today's popular surfing school global movement. The academy operated until 1992 with Wayne personally providing expert instruction, training and advice to many children and aspiring surfers in Australia.

Wayne was appointed as National Coach for the Australian representative surfing team in 1992. The team competed in the 1992 ISA biannual World Surfing Championships in Lacanau, France, taking the gold medal for Australia. In 1994 Wayne returned as head coach to defend his 1992 achievement, returning the Australian team to the podium for a consecutive gold medal result. The ISA World Surfing Championships are known widely as the Olympics of surfing sports.

From 1993 to 1998 he operated Elite Rabbit Surf Camps, again focussing on training, coaching and mentoring rising surfing talent and youth.

Wayne's surf coaching has endured and from 1987 to 2015 Wayne where he also mentored and coached a variety of local boardrider's club teams to success including leading the Snapper Rocks Surfriders Club at thirteen consecutive Straddie Teams Assault events held at North Stradbroke Island, twelve Kirra Teams Challenge events, two Quiksilver National Surf League events and two National Australian Boardrider's Battles.

=== World Masters titles ===
In 1999 Wayne won the ASP Masters World Surfing Champion title in France, the same year he took the helm as president and CEO of the ASP.

In 2003 he won the ASP Grand Masters World Surfing Champion title, making him a three-time world surfing champion and further cementing his status as an icon of the sport.

== Corporate career ==
=== Association of Surfing Professionals ===
In 1976 Wayne was part of the Original Founder Group for what is now the modern incarnation of the foremost professional surfing governing body the World Surf League (WSL), and was a cornerstone participant in the formation of a new era of world professional surfing.

From 1977 through to 1988, Bartholomew served as Director for the newly formed Association of Surfing Professionals (ASP), which would become the peak governing body for professional surfing competition globally in 1983. During this time he championed reform and development of the sport including initiatives to solidify the man-on-man format of competition as the benchmark standard for surfing competition excellence — a format devised by fellow Gold Coast surfing innovator Peter Drouyn at the first Stubbies Surf Classic event in 1977 held at Burleigh Heads in which Wayne was also a prominent competitor, having made the finals in 1977 and returning to win the event in 1978.

In 1996 he returned to the ASP as Contest Director for the Gold Coast Billabong Pro world tour event held at Kirra Point on the Gold Coast, an event which successfully ran until 1999 with Wayne as Director and drew large crowds again to Burleigh Point and Kirra Point, attracting significant international media coverage whilst re-establishing the Gold Coast as a significant surfing destination to a global audience.

From 1999 to 2009, Wayne Bartholomew served as President of the Association of Surfing Professionals, holding the additional role of chief executive officer (CEO) from 1999 to 2003. In these positions, he oversaw operational aspects of the world tour events, managed business activities, and promoted surfing as an internationally recognized sport and lifestyle. During his tenure, the sport experienced notable growth, with top-ranked surfers gaining widespread recognition and increased financial investment in professional surfing.

Bartholomew introduced the concept of powered personal watercraft or jet skis to assist surfers competing in events to maximise their ability to catch waves when conditions were challenging, a practice which is commonplace nowadays in professional surfing events and big wave surfing.

He is credited as having reinvented the professional surfing tour by establishing the 'Dream Tour', a modern format that favoured surfing events being held in formidable world-class surfing conditions at premier surfing locations away from traditional populated centres, as well as incorporating extended waiting periods to ensure the best possible swell and wind conditions for surfers to compete in were realised.

Wayne stepped down from his role with the ASP in March 2009. Richard Grellman, Chairman of the ASP Board of Directors at the time, said of Wayne's contributions to the governing of professional surfing that, "he has always represented ASP with integrity and candor. He is the visionary that started the Tour and then reinvented it again with the Dream Tour. We have a global, respected professional surf tour thanks to Rabbit and owe him a mountain of thanks."

=== Billabong ===
From 1990 until 1999 Wayne was appointed as Special Projects Manager for the emerging global apparel giant Billabong. The company underwent a significant growth period during this time, rising to become a widely recognised international surf and youth-culture clothing brand which was publicly floated in the year 2000 with annual turnover of A$225 million, growing to sales of A$1.7 billion by the year 2011. The initial offering of stock exceeded expectations, with the sale of stock closing early.

=== Billabong Pro ===
From 1996 until 1999 Wayne also oversaw the running of the Billabong Pro on the Gold Coast, a premier ASP world surfing tour event and season opener featuring the best surfers in the world competing at the iconic Gold Coast surf breaks of Burleigh Point and Kirra Point. As the official Contest Director, he was responsible for each event in its entirety — from the lead up and set up to the conclusion — ensuring maximum operational efficiency whilst providing a state-of-the-art experience for competitors and spectators alike. The 1997 event saw Bartholomew move the contest away from its base at Kirra Point to instead compete at Burleigh Point. The move was hailed as a pioneering moment in professional surfing history with the event utilising its flexibility to maximise wave quality and provide the best possible conditions for surfers and spectators. The result of the move showcased Wayne's innovative forward thinking in redeveloping surfing contest formats and brought thousands of fans to Burleigh Point to watch the likes of Kelly Slater, Damien Hardman, Shane Beschan, Mark Occhilupo, Ross Williams, Michael Barry and Peterson Rosa do battle at Burleigh's natural amphitheatre of contest surfing, recreating scenes not witnessed since the Stubbies Surf Classic events on the late 1970s.

The 1999 event was the first major surfing event to be broadcast on the internet, making professional surfing freely available to be viewed live by millions of spectators and fans for the first time in the history of the sport.

The events were credited as putting the Gold Coast back on the international contest surfing map and sparking a wave of surf tourism and investment for the city.

=== Other roles ===
From the late 1980s onwards Wayne has contributed both in a volunteer and a working capacity to various companies, organisations and global initiatives, applying his experience and practical abilities with great success. Some of his appointments have included running Indigenous Surf Camps at the Tallebudgera Recreation Centre in the mid-1990s through to being appointed a Global Ambassador for international wetsuit and surf clothing brand Hurley International from 2010 to 2019.

From 1987 until 1992 Wayne served as President of the Snapper Rocks Surfriders Club.

In 1996 he was appointed UN Ambassador for the Ocean in the International Year of the Ocean.

Wayne has been the Queensland Community Representative on the Tweed River Entrance Sand Bypass Committee since 1992.

He is currently a Global Ambassador for Gold Coast-based retail company The Surfboard Warehouse, joining prestigious names such as Hollywood actor Jason Momoa and two-time ASP World Longboard Surfing Champion Beau Young.

== Politics ==
=== 2020 Queensland State Election ===
On Sunday 17 August 2020, Queensland Premier Annastacia Palaszczuk announced that Wayne Bartholomew would be representing Labor and contesting the Queensland Parliament seat of Burleigh at the 2020 Queensland state election against incumbent Liberal National Party member Michael Hart.

At the time of the announcement of his candidacy, Bartholomew told local media, "This is not an easy time for anyone in this country and it's not an easy time in the world, so I want to step up now ... I challenge anyone to love the Gold Coast more than I do."

== Personal life ==
The award-winning documentary Bustin' Down the Door depicts Rabbit's early days in Coolangatta, Queensland and his roller coaster ride to the top, overcoming obstacles along the way in his bid to bring credibility to the sport and draws upon his earlier biography, Bustin' Down the Door — first published in 1996 and reprinted in 2002.

In 1987, he was inducted into the Australian Surfing Hall of Fame.

In 2001, Wayne's eldest sister Wendy Scadden was diagnosed with brain cancer, beginning a lengthy battle against the disease. In a 2010 interview with the USA based Surfer Magazine, Wayne was asked if he could trade his 1978 World Title for anything in the world, what would it be, to which he answered, "There is no doubt about it, as one gets older the appreciation grows for the simple act of riding waves, paddling in the ocean and enjoying the health to do it. World Championship glory dims considerably in the clear light of a beautiful day. If I could wish for one thing, and give it all back, it would be the recovery of my sister Wendy." On the 5th of February 2018, after a 17-year battle against cancer, Wendy passed away. She was 65 years of age, married and had two children and two grandchildren.

In 2009, Bartholomew was inducted into the Queensland Sport Hall of Fame.

In 2009, he was appointed a Member of the Order of Australia by Her Majesty Queen Elizabeth II via the Governor General of Australia Dame Quentin Bryce, for his services to surfing as a competitor, administrator and mentor, and to the environment through support for a range of coastal conservation groups.

In 2013, Bartholomew was an interview subject in the award-winning ESPN documentary Hawaiian: The Legend of Eddie Aikau, in which he described the experiences and tensions between Australian and Hawaiian surfers in 1976 on Oahu's North Shore.

In 2016, he was appointed the Official Patron of the newly established Gold Coast World Surfing Reserve which covers the southern coastal shores of the Gold Coast and encompasses the famous surf breaks of Snapper Rocks, Rainbow Bay, Greenmount, Kirra, Currumbin Alley and Burleigh Heads.

Wayne remains active as a surfer, campaigner, mentor, ambassador and community leader. He has three sons, Jaggar (2001), Keo (2003) and Cruz (2011).

== Awards and honours ==
- 1972 Australian Schoolboys Surfing Champion
- 1973, 74, 76 Queensland Open Men's Surfing Champion
- 1977 ASP World Surfing Champion Runner-up
- 1978 Burleigh Heads Stubbies Surf Classic Champion
- 1978 ASP World Surfing Champion
- 1978, 1984 Gold Coast Sports Person of the Year
- 1984 ASP World Surfing Champion Runner-up
- 1987 Inducted into Australian Surfing Hall of Fame
- 1993 Australian Senior Men's Surfing Champion
- 1998 Appointed Surfing Ambassador, International Year of the Ocean, United Nations
- ASP Service to the Sport Award
- 1999 ASP Masters World Surfing Champion
- 1999 Inducted into Sport Australia Hall of Fame
- 2001 Inducted into USA Surfing Hall of Fame
- 2003 ASP Grand Masters World Surfing Champion
- 2006 Inducted into Australian Walk of Fame
- 2008 Movie of the Year, USA Surfer Poll Awards; for Bustin' Down the Door.
- 2008 Documentary of the Year, USA Surfer Poll Awards; for Bustin’ Down the Door.
- 2009 Awarded Member (AM) in the General Division of the Order of Australia
- 2011 ASP Masters World Surfing Champion Runner-up
- 2016 Named Official Patron of The Gold Coast World Surfing Reserve
- 2018 Wayne “Rabbit” Bartholomew Bridge at Currumbin beachfront dedicated to 'The Godfather of Professional Surfing'

Achievements
| Preceded by Shaun Tomson | International Professional Surfers World Champion (men's); 1978 | Succeeded by Mark Richards |
