= Shaun Tomson =

South African surfer

Personal information
- Born: 21 August 1955 (age 70) Durban, South Africa
- Years active: 1969–1990
- Website: https://shauntomson.com/

Surfing career
- Sport: Surfing
- Best year: 1977
- Major achievements: 1977 IPS World Champion

Surfing specifications
- Stance: Regular (natural foot)

Shaun Tomson (born 21 August 1955) is a South African and American professional surfer and former world champion, environmentalist, actor, author, and businessman. He has been listed among the top ten surfers of the century, and was the 1977 World Surfing Champion.

== Early life and education ==
Tomson was born in Durban, South Africa, and is Jewish. His mother, Marie (1930 - 2021), grew up in Malta, where she survived the Siege of Malta, bombing raids by the air and naval forces of Fascist Italy and Nazi Germany and was evacuated to South Africa. She later converted to Judaism. His father Ernie (Chony) Tomchinsky (1930 - 1981), was born to Jewish parents, with Shaun's grandfather, Samuel Tomchinsky fleeing pogroms in the Russian Empire (present-day) Latvia in the early 1900s. Ernie was a world class swimmer, whose sporting career was cut short by a shark attack. Shaun had his Bar Mitzvah at his familial shul, Temple David, a Reform congregation.

Tomson was educated in Durban, first attending Clifton Preparatory and then completing his high school education and matric at Carmel College, a Jewish High School. He later enrolled at University of Natal, where he received a Bachelor of Commerce degree majoring in Business Finance. He graduated from Northeastern University with a Master of Science in leadership with a focus on social change.

He learned to surf in the beachbreaks in and around Durban under the watchful eye of his father Ernie, and alongside older cousin Michael Tomson and brother Paul Tomson.

As a Jewish athlete, he was inducted into the International Jewish Sports Hall of Fame in 1995.

== Career ==
Tomson went on to dominate amateur surfing competition in South Africa and began venturing over to Hawaii in the late 1960s, courtesy of a bar mitzvah present from his father. It was on one of these trips that an awestruck 14-year-old Tomson witnessed first hand the so-called "Biggest Wave Ever Ridden" by Californian Greg Noll at Mākaha in 1969. Hawaii's surf proved to be a daunting challenge for Tomson, but he continued to mature and train in South Africa's hollow waves, such as Cave Rock, the Bay of Plenty, and Jeffrey's Bay.

Tomson won 19 major professional surf events, has been listed as one of the 25 most influential surfers of the century and as one of the 10 greatest surfers of all time. During his career he was both the youngest and oldest surfer to win a pro event, and is considered to be one of the architects of professional surfing.

=== Surfing and the Free Ride generation ===
In 1975, Tomson was an integral part of the "Free Ride" generation. Along with Australians Wayne Bartholomew, Mark Richards, Ian Cairns, Peter Townend, and Mark Warren, they rode waves along Oahu's legendary North Shore. Collectively, these surfers changed the face of surfing and were the first to really apply themselves as serious professional surfers. Tomson won the International Professional Surfers World Championship in 1977.

On a performance level, Tomson changed the way the tube section of the wave was ridden, using a style of pumping and weaving through and around collapsing sections of the barrel. A quote of his from the period was, "Time is expanded inside the tube." An aspect of Tomson's inventiveness was his in the tube punch throughs where he escaped unscathed from hideous closeout sections over a shallow reef.

=== Accolades and honours ===
In 2014 Tomson was inducted into the Southern California Jewish Sports Hall of Fame. He has also been inducted into the Huntington Beach Surfing Walk of Fame (1997), the International Jewish Sports Hall of Fame (1998), the South African Sports Hall of Fame (1977), and received the SIMA Environmentalist of the Year Award (2002) and the Surfrider Lifetime Achievement Award (2009).

In 2024, at the South African Jewish Board of Deputies' 120th anniversary gala dinner, he was honoured among 100 remarkable Jewish South Africans who have contributed to South Africa. The ceremony included speeches from Chief Rabbi Ephraim Mirvis, and Tomson was honoured among other sports figures such as Jody Scheckter, Ali Bacher and Joel Stransky.

== Other ventures ==
Tomson founded, managed, and sold two multi-million market-leading clothing brands, with the Surf focused Instinct in the 1980s, and Solitude in the 1990s.

Tomson is a motivational speaker who focuses on the influence of positive values have on success in life and business based on his own experiences, in and out of the surf. An attitude of commitment and positivity is the basis for Tomson's business philosophy based on his "Surfer's Code – 12 Simple Lessons for Riding through Life". He has spoken internationally and has shared the stage with well-known personalities, including Sir Richard Branson and Malcolm Gladwell, for corporations such as General Motors, Cisco, Price Waterhouse, Toys R Us, Sasol, Disney, Google, Primedia, MTN and Adcock Ingram.

In October 2024, he relaunched his brand, Instinct. Tomson explained: “In our divided and fractured world, Instinct what I'm intending to inspire, and unite people through the values in the Surfer's Code.”

Tomson is also the author of Surfer's Code – 12 Simple lessons for riding through life and The Code - The Power of I Will. He also authored Bustin' Down the Door – Revolution of '75, a companion to the film of the same name and Krazy Kreatures – Under my Surfboard!, a collection of illustrated rhymes for children. In 2022, he released The Surfer and the Sage with Familius Publishing.

Tomson has released 3 iPhone/iPad applications – Surfboards, a reference guide for surfboards; Surfer – a digital form of Surfer's Code and Surf Creatures, animated rhymes for children.

== Personal life ==
=== Family ===
In 1980, Tomson relocated to California. He was joined by his mother Marie, sister Tracy and brother, Paul. In 1983, Tomson began dating Carla Winnick. The pair married four years later at his familial shul, Temple David in Durban.

The Tomsons' son Mathew died at 15 years of age on 24 April 2006 in Durban, South Africa, from an accidental death caused by playing the "choking game." In his autobiography, published in 2022, Tomson wrote about reconnecting with his Jewish faith in the wake of the tragedy of his son's death and returning to Temple David.

Tomson lives with his wife and adopted son, Luke in Montecito, California, in Santa Barbara, California, and surfs daily.

=== Identity ===
In 1985 he spoke to The Los Angeles Times about his South African identity: "I didn't leave South Africa for moral reasons. California was the place for me in terms of my future. I know there are a lot of things inherently wrong in South Africa. But I've never denied I'm from there." He continued: "I feel South Africa has potential to be a great country. But there has to be a form of power share. The black man has no say in the government at the moment, and you can't get away with it, it's an unfair situation. I've come out publicly that I do not like the policy of apartheid and am opposed to the kind of system of government in South Africa. But I'm also opposed to violent change.”

Amid the Gaza War and rising levels of antisemitism, Tomson has spoken about his Jewish identity: “So my relationship with my religion and Israel has changed…I am now no longer Jewish. I am a Jew...” Tomson travelled to Israel at the invitation of Omer Levy of Shabbat Surf Club, where he participated in a memorial paddle for the twenty-six surfers killed in the terrorist attacks of October 7 perpetrated by Hamas.

== Environmentalism ==
Tomson is a board member and ambassador for Surfrider Foundation, the environmental group dedicated to protecting the world's oceans, waves, and beaches. In 1984 he was the first professional surfer to become a member of the foundation and was chairman of the advisory board. In 2002 he received the Surf Industry Manufacturer Association Environmentalist of the Year Award for his environmental efforts. Tomson co-founded and remains affiliated with the environmentally active celebrity surfer organization Project Save Our Surf.

== Filmography ==
Tomson has appeared in films, including Free Ride, Fantasea, Many Classic Moments, and In God's Hands. Tomson also co-produced an award-winning full-length feature film about the benchmark mid-1970s surfing era called Bustin' Down the Door, which premiered in early 2008. He wrote and narrated a documentary about Jeffreys Bay called A Pure Line.

== See also ==
- List of Jewish surfers

Achievements
Preceded by Peter Townend	International Professional Surfers World Champion (men's); 1977	Succeeded by Wayne Bartholomew
