= Surfabout =

Surfing competition (1974–1991)

Surfabout was a surfing competition held annually in Sydney, Australia between 1974 and 1983. It was sponsored by Coca-Cola and radio station 2SM and hence called the Coke Surfabout or the Coke/2SM Surfabout. The contest was run in late Autumn, after the Bells Beach Classic at Easter. The contest was resurrected as the Coke Classic in 1986.

Journalist Graham Cassidy promoted the event in its early years. Surfabout was accepted by mainstream Australian media and was a component in the mainstreaming of professional sport surfing.

The contest was taken to Channel 9 in 1978 by 2SM Program Director Barry Chapman who convinced then Director of Sport David Hill that Surfabout would make great television. The promotions and advertising manager at the time for Coca-Cola bottlers Sydney was Colin Gelling who was instrumental in televising the event and was executive producer. The series won a Gold Logie for 'Best Sports Event' that year. Surfabout had a waiting period and was mobile so it could go to the best waves on Sydney's northern beaches. It also followed the man on man format, previously devised by Peter Drouyn for the 1977 Stubbies at Burleigh Heads, Queensland, and this added further excitement for spectators and television viewers.

In 1979 down to the round of 16, Sydney went completely flat and showed no signs of improving. With the contest and television program series at risk, Chapman and Hill – after discussion with contest director Holmes – decided to fly the final 16 contestants, contest officials, and television crew 600 miles to Bells Beach for the remaining rounds. Six light aircraft flew over Bells Beach to find a usable 8 ft swell.

In 1991 Coke ran a promotion giving the winner of a "pick the best wave" television competition a spot competing in the Surfabout. This was controversial among professional surfers because it would put some couch potato into a contest which had, at the time, the second-highest prize money on the world tour. Mark Richards defended them, saying "without Coke there is no such thing as professional surfing in Australia".

== Winners ==
Year	Winner
1974	Michael Peterson
1975	Wayne Lynch
1976	Mark Richards
1977	Simon Anderson
1978	Larry Blair
1979	Cheyne Horan
1980	Buzzy Kerbox
1981	Simon Anderson
1982	Wayne Bartholomew
1983	Tom Carroll
