= Them Terribles =

American rock band

- Origin: Santa Barbara, California, USA
- Years active: 2003–present
- Labels: unsigned
- Members: Matt Green, lead singer Jonny Black, guitarist Geoff Franklin, bass Joey Benenati, drums
- Website: Official website

Them Terribles is an American rock band based in Los Angeles, California.

== History ==
In 2001, while juniors in high school, cousins Jonny Black (former lead guitarist) and Hunter Black (former rhythm guitarist) formed a band under the name "Standard Issue" along with current Them Terribles lead singer Matt Green. Jonny recruited Joey Benenati, a fellow student at Santa Barbara High School to play drums. The band was originally rounded out by Mikee Hudson on bass who was a high school friend of Hunter and Matt. Most of them had known each other since grade school,. In 2003 they moved to Los Angeles to attend college and continued playing gigs under the name "Mind Your Own". Geoff Franklin, a student at Loyola Marrymount University with Hunter and Jonny, replaced Mikee Hudson on bass. The band decided to change their name to Them Terribles in 2005. The name was a spoof of "The Tearaways", which is the name of the drummer, Joey Benenati's, father's band. Soon after, the band became a four-piece without rhythm guitarist Hunter Black. In 2007 the band gained national recognition after placing in the top three in an MTV2-sponsored band contest, leading to tours throughout the West Coast. In late 2008 the lead guitarist Jonny Black was replaced by Marcus Affeldt and bass player Geoff Franklin was replaced by Jimmy Marvitch. Since 2008 the newly formed Them Terribles, which retained singer Matt Green and drummer Joey Benenati, have continued to play shows around the country and gain popularity.

== Style and influences ==
The band plays punk and 1960s-inspired straight-ahead rock music, in an independent garage band style. They mention Misfits, International Noise Conspiracy, and The Zombies as influences and have been compared with The Hives, The Strokes, Richard Hell, Dion & the Belmonts, The Animals, The Von Bondies, and Black Rebel Motorcycle Club.

== Discography ==
- Rock, Paper, Terribles, self-published EP, 2007.

== Film ==
- Bustin' Down The Door, 2008, soundtrack.

== Awards and recognition ==
- 2005, Velvet Jones "Battle of the Bands". Despite being forced off stage by club management partway through their performance for throwing a beer bottle into the audience, the band won the contest, leading to a touring spot on the Vans Warped Tour.
- 2005, "Rock the Plank", Los Angeles, winner.
- In 2007 the band entered MTV2's annual "Dew Circuit Breakout" contest on a lark, after watching a television commercial for the event. They were one of twelve finalists, out of a field of approximately 5,000 entries. As one of the final three the band played at MTV's studios at Times Square in New York City. As a result of its appearance in the contest, the band was featured in at least two MTV video features, and placed on rotation on MTV2.
