= Ku Ikaika Challenge =

Oahu Quicksilver big wave Competition

The Ku Ikaika Challenge was a big-wave competition, held at Makaha Beach, in Mākaha, Hawaii, on the island of Oahu. It was planned as an annual competition first held on February 14, 2008, in surf between 15 and 25 feet. Aaron Napoleon won the contest. The winner for first place received $4,000. This challenge was mainly sponsored by Quick Silver. The challenge itself was a one-day event.

== 1st Annual Ku Ikaika: Famous Competitors ==
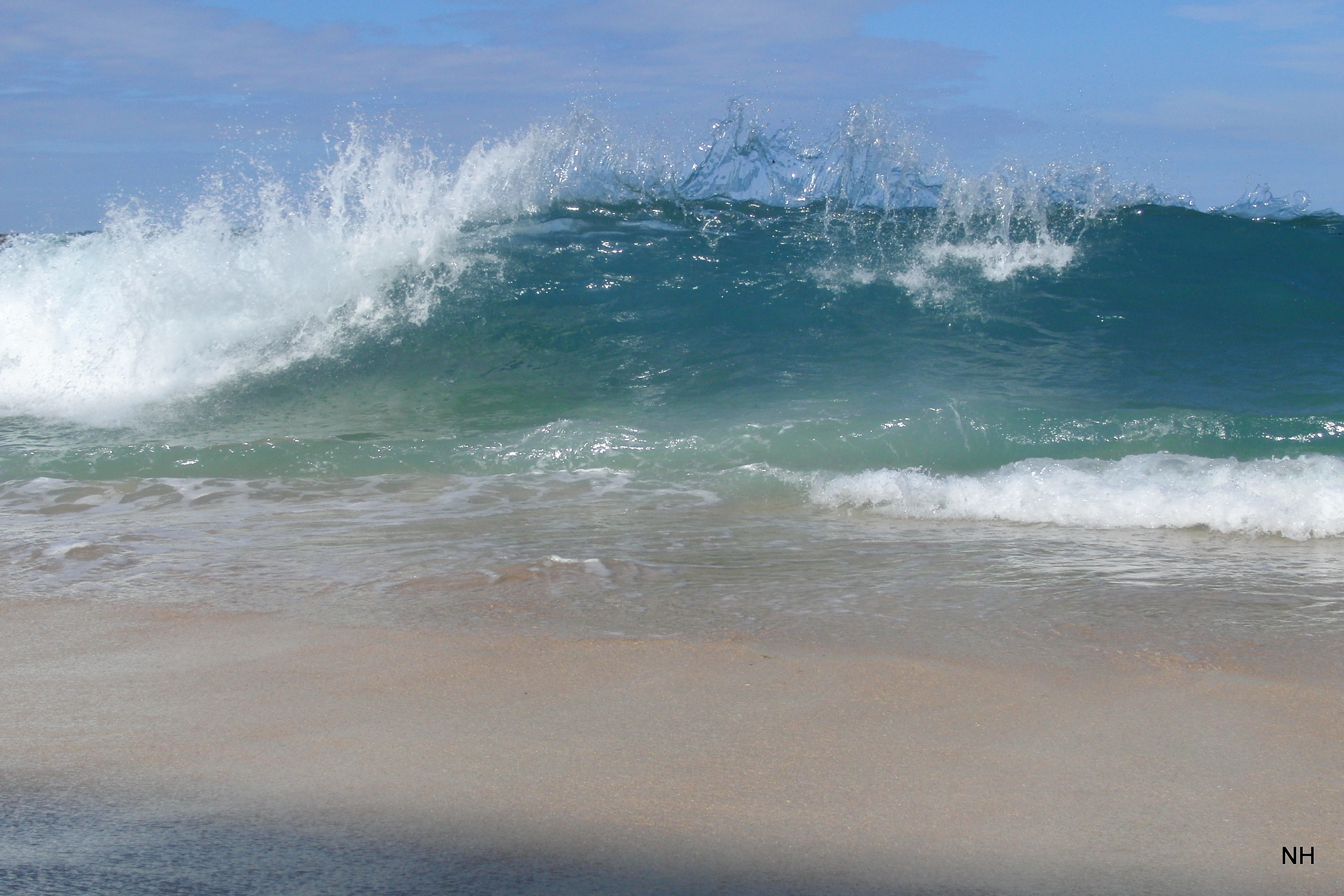

Brian Keaulana helped organize the event. Bonga Perkins, Jamie Sterling, Garrett McNamara, Raimana Van Bastolaer, Buzzy Kerbox, Chris Mauro, and Kainoa McGee were some of the better-known competitors in the 2008 event. The picture to the right is of Makaha Beach.
