= Dalani Tanahy =

American artist (born 1961)

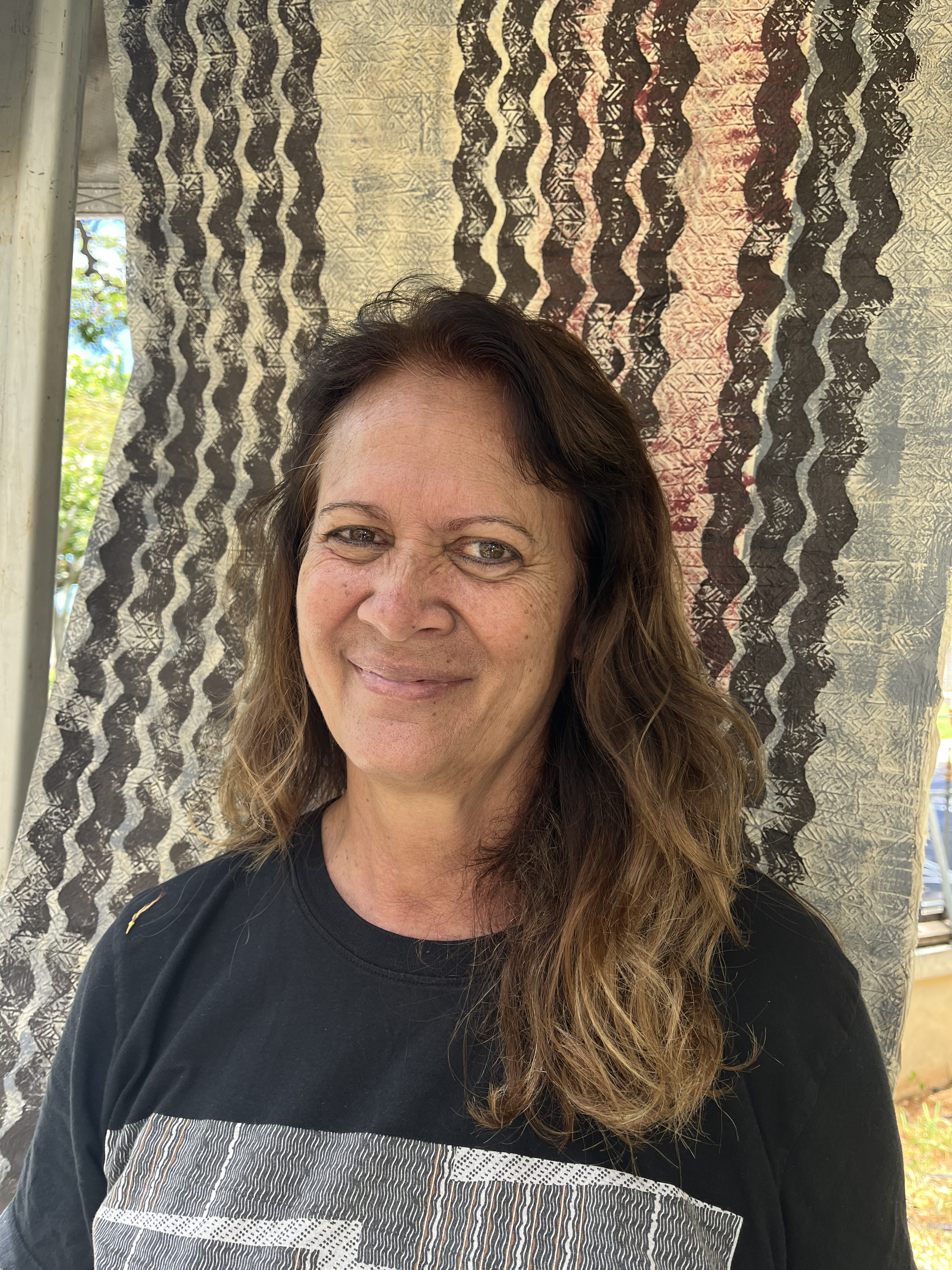
- Born: July 22, 1961; San Diego
- Occupation: Textile artist
- Website: dalani-tanahy.pixels.com

Dalani Tanahy (born July 22, 1961) is an American artist specializing in the Hawaiian art of creating kapa, fabric made by beating bark. Tanahy creates kapa for artistic and ceremonial purposes and teaches courses and workshops. She is the founder of Kapa Hawaii, an organization dedicated to reviving and preserving the art of kapa creation.

== Early life ==
Dalani Kaye Prager was born on July 22, 1961. She was born and raised in San Diego, California, with a Hawaiian, Portuguese, and Caucasian ethnic background. Her maternal grandparents lived in La’ie, O’ahu and she spent summers visiting them as a child. Tanahy moved to Oahu after finishing high school in 1979 and has lived in Mākaha since 1986.

== Artwork and teaching ==
Tanahy was inspired to learn the art of creating kapa by taking a course from kumu hula (hula teacher) Kawai Aona-Ueoka, motivating her to spend many years discovering techniques by trial and error. Tanahy later worked as a kapa teacher for fourth graders at the Cultural Learning Center at Kaala. She went on to found an organization, Kapa Hawaii, to educate children and adults about the types of tapa (Polynesian barkcloth), specifically the Hawaiian variation, kapa. Along with other kumu (expert teachers), Tanahy works to revive the tradition of kapa through research, experimentation, and sharing knowledge through workshops and classes.

She is involved in each step of crafting kapa, including growing both the wauke (paper mulberry) used as cloth fibers and the native plants used to dye the cloth, as well as carving her own hōhoa, the kapa beaters used to crush the plant fibers.

Tanahy's work has been exhibited by the Bishop Museum, the British Museum and the National Museum of the American Indian. She was awarded a 2015 Native Hawaiian Artist Fellowship by the Native Arts and Cultures Foundation and was the recipient of a Lifetime Achievement Award from the Polynesian Cultural Center. In 2018 she served as the inaugural Master Kumu for the Hawaiian-Pacific Studies program at University of Hawaiʻi at West Oʻahu.
