= Duke Kahanamoku Invitational Surfing Championship =

Surfing championship named in honor of Duke Paoa Kahinu Mokoe Hulikohola Kahanamoku

The Duke Kahanamoku Invitational Surfing Championship is named in honor of the "Father of Modern Surfing", Duke Paoa Kahinu Mokoe Hulikohola Kahanamoku. The contest began in 1965 by invitation only at Sunset Beach on the North Shore of Oʻahu until it was replaced by the Billabong Pro in 1985. The championship was the first surfing event to be broadcast on a regular basis by ABC's Wide World of Sports.

Two dozen of the best surfers in the world attended the first championship with big-wave surfers like Greg Noll and Fred Hemmings as competitors. Surfer Jeff Hakman was only seventeen when he claimed his first title. Noll's streamlined, Semigun surfboard design became the board of choice for contestants riding the Sunset Beach waves, with Ricky Grigg riding a Semigun to victory. Duke Kahanamoku handed out golden "Duke" statues to the winners for the first three years before he died on January 22, 1968.

The first native Hawaiian to win the championship was Clyde Aikau, in 1973, followed in 1977 by his older brother, Eddie Aikau.

== Winners. 1960 ==
Awards from 1965 to 1984:

- 1965 Jeff Hakman
- 1966 Ricky Grigg
- 1967 Jock Sutherland
- 1968 Mike Doyle
- 1969 Joey Cabell
- 1970 Jeff Hakman
- 1971 Jeff Hakman
- 1972 James Jones
- 1973 Clyde Aikau
- 1974 Larry Bertlemann
- 1975 Ian Cairns
- 1976 James Jones
- 1977 Eddie Aikau
- 1978 Michael Ho
- 1979 Mark Richards
- 1980 Mark Warren
- 1981 Michael Ho
- 1982 Ken Bradshaw
- 1983 Dane Kealoha
- 1984 Derek Ho
