= Paul Taublieb =

American director, writer, and producer

Paul Taublieb is an American director, writer, and producer best known for films such as The Vow and the Emmy Award-winning documentaries "Unchained: The Untold Story of Freestyle MotoCross" and "Hawaiian: The Legend of Eddie Aikau" (part of ESPN's 30 for 30 series).

== Career ==
=== Film ===
Taublieb found early success producing television movies, including the award-winning anti-slavery film "Enslavement: The True Story of Fanny Kemble" (2000), winner of the Literacy in Media Award (2001) for Showtime. Starring Jane Seymour, "Enslavement" tells the real-life story of a British actress who speaks out against slavery after marrying an American plantation owner. In 2012, Taublieb broke away from television to produce a feature film, "The Vow," starring Channing Tatum and Rachel McAdams. It grossed almost $200M at the box office and is the eighth highest-grossing romantic drama since the 1980s.

=== Documentary ===
After getting his start in narrative film, Taublieb established himself in the production of documentaries focusing primarily on action sports projects, including the specials "Pipeline Sessions" (2002), about the lives of the world's top surfers, and "The Making of Motowars" (2005), a behind-the-scenes look at a live motorcycle stunt show. He then traveled to the remote island of São Tomé to direct "The Lost Wave: An African Surf Story," an exploration of the distinct surfing subculture that has developed in the isolated nation.

In 2011, Taublieb served as producer and creative director for the documentary film "Fastest," a documentary following the 2010 season of the MotoGP, known as the Grand Prix of motorcycle racing. The film features Jorge Lorenzo, Valentino Rossi, Ben Spies, and narration by Ewan McGregor. Taublieb also produced an installment of the ESPN documentary series 30 for 30, entitled "Hawaiian: The Legend of Eddie Aikau" (2013). The film chronicles the life and disappearance of the famed big wave surfer Eddie Aikau, who died while attempting to find help after his sailing canoe capsized. In 2014, the film won an Emmy Award for Best Sports Documentary.

As a producer and director, Taublieb has created several motocross-focused documentary films. "Unchained: The Untold Story of Freestyle Motocross" (2016) tells the story of the birth of freestyle motocross, featuring Carey Hart, Tony Hawk, Travis Pastrana, and narration by Josh Brolin. It was released on Netflix and won the 2017 Emmy Award for Outstanding Long Sports Documentary.

Most recently, Taublieb completed "Blood Line: The Life and Times of Brian Deegan" (2018) about the most decorated Freestyle Motocross rider in history.

=== Sports ===
Taublieb is one of the creators of the ESPN X Games and has produced many of the moto-x competitions. He also produces live content and athlete features for the event. Alongside partners Rob Dyrdek and David Paull, Taublieb created ISX Scoring, the premier real-time scoring system for action sports events.

=== Short Form ===
Taublieb Films is the creative agency of record for Monster Energy and produces viral videos and other content for clients including Ferrari, Lamborghini, Fox Studios, Disney, and ESPN. He also creates short-form viral videos with talent including Rob Drydek and Wee Man. In 2014, he produced and directed the soccer video "Abuelo Memo" for the Mexican company Coppel. It quickly went viral and currently has over 100 million views worldwide.

== Personal life ==
=== Education ===
Taublieb attended Great Neck North High School before studying English at the University at Buffalo and philosophy at SUNY Plattsburgh.

=== Family ===
He and his wife Susan Cooper have three sons, Zev, Ari, and Noah Taublieb. He currently lives in Malibu. Ari Taublieb is an internet personality known for his "Early Retirement Academy" and VP role at Root Financial Partners.
