= Laura Lee Ching =

American surfer

Personal information
- Born: Laura Blears; December 25, 1950 (age 75) Buffalo, New York, U.S.
- Years active: 1970s–1980s

Surfing career
- Sport: Surfing

Laura Lee Ching, also known as Laura Blears, Laura Blears Ching and Laura Blears Cody (born December 25, 1950) is an American surfer.

== Early life ==
On December 25, 1950, Laura was born. Her father was Lord James Blears (died 2016), a professional wrestler and amateur surfer. Her mother was Leonora "Lee" Adelaina (died 2007). Laura had three siblings, Jimmy (also a champion surfer; died 2011), Clinton, and Carol.

== Career ==
Laura won the 1972 Makaha Invitational and became the first woman to compete in the Smirnoff World Pro-Am Surfing Championships in 1973. She was the world number one female surfer in 1973. She also appeared on What's My Line? and ABC's Wide World of Sports' Challenge of the Sexes.

== Recognition ==
Laura appeared in a six-page pictorial for Playboy magazine in its July, 1975 issue. Her pictorial, titled, "Super Surfer", was shot at Keawaʻula Beach (popularly known as Yokohama Beach) in Hawaii, while surfing nude on a Lightning Bolt surfboard and walking on the beach carrying her surfboard, as well as photos of Laura indoors, lying naked in a bed.

Additional photos not featured in the issue were published in January, 1978, in the Playboy Brazil version, published at the time as " A Revista do Homem". More pictures of her nude surfing were featured than in the USA issue, but did not feature full frontal photos (omitting the pubic hair area), which in the USA issue featured one on her lying full frontal on the surfboard. Playboy would reissue the opening two page spread of Laura on her surfboard in a yoga position, with one of her surfing, in the 1983 special newsstand edition, "Girls of Summer '83", then featured her once more in the special 1987 newsstand issue, "Wet and Wild Women", this time in a two-page spread with Laura on her surfboard, featuring a closeup of her naked buttocks, with two more photos of her nude surfing on each side.

In 1979, the Supersisters trading card set was produced and distributed; one of the cards featured Laura's name and picture.

In 2022 she received the restaurant Kimo's Maui's first Pioneers of Surfing Award.
