= Lion Foundation Surf League =

- No. of teams: 8
- Country: New Zealand
- Most recent champion: Taranaki

The Lion Foundation Surf League was established by Surf Life Saving New Zealand as an elite series for the top one percent of its athletes. Its purpose was to pit the best Surf Lifeguards in the country against each other to ensure that those who prevailed were the best of the best. The competition consists of 8 teams in the Open and U19 teams.

The Events remain standard to normal Surf Life Saving Carnivals in New Zealand they include:

Surf race, Board race, Ski race, Ironman, Tube rescue, Board rescue, Beach sprints, Beach Flags, Canoe (Open only), IRB, Dearlove relay (A relay that consists of all disciplines not normally contested at Surf Life Saving Carnivals)

Team Make up:

The Open teams consist of 14 members from their respective regions, with the U19 teams made up of 10 members teams are also able to draft athletes from other regions provided this is sanctioned by SLSCNZ and the athletes are released by their own region.

	Open and U19 Representative teams
1	Wellington
2	Canterbury
3	Hawke's Bay
4	Bay of Plenty
5	Taranaki
6	Auckland
7	Otago
8	Gisborne
