= Margo Oberg =

American surfer

- Born: September 8, 1953 (age 72); Pennsylvania
- Occupations: Surfer, surfing instructor

Margo Oberg (born Margo Godfrey; September 8, 1953 in Pennsylvania) was the first female professional surfer in the world. She won her first competition at the age of 11, won her first world title at 15, and became the first professional female surfer in 1975.

== Biography ==
Margo Godfrey was born on September 8, 1953, in Pennsylvania and her family moved to La Jolla, California when she was five years old. She began surfing at the age of ten, and began competing a year later at the 1965 Western Regional Surfing Championships, at which she won in her division (San Diego female residents). She earned her first national title in 1966 when she won the 12-and-under division at the Menehune Championships; she was the only girl in the division. During this early stage of her career, she was coached by former World Champion Mike Doyle, who also shaped her surf boards. She began surfing on longboards, but switched to short boards in 1968.

By the time she was 15 years old, she was the top-seeded women's surfer in California. She won the 1968 World Contest in Puerto Rico, and successfully defended her title in 1969. After coming in second place in the 1970 World Contest in Australia, she retired from surfing in dismay. She said later, "The loss was so devastating that I retired." In 1972, she graduated from high school, married Steve Oberg, and moved to Hawaii where she taught surfing and managed a beach concession stand.

She returned to surfing in 1974, winning a contest in Malibu. In 1975, she and six other women competed in the men's Smirnoff contest; she came in first among the women and third overall, winning $1,000 and becoming the first woman to be paid for surfing, and continued her professional career by signing contract with surf brand Lightning Bolt. She won the first three professional world championships in 1975, 1976, and 1977, as well as in 1980, 1981, and 1983. She won the WISA Hang Ten Championships and the women's event at the Smirnoff World Pro-Am Surfing Championships. In 1976 and 1977, she was "unofficially" crowned Women's World Champion, winning at the Bells contest, the Coke, the Brazil International, and the Women's Masters. In 1978, she won the Stubbies and the Bells contest, and came in first on the overall Surfer magazine poll (she had first won the poll in 1968.) She continued to compete professionally until 1991, when she finished fourth in the world championships.

Oberg started her own a surfing school in 1977, the Margo Oberg Surf School, on the island of Kauai. She still owns and operates her surf school to this day. She is the author of a book chapter on competitive surfing strategies for women.

She is the mother of two sons, Shane Kainoa (born in the early 1980s) and Jason Kaipo (b. 1987). She has identified herself as a Pentecostal Christian, and would seek out churches while traveling. She said, "I didn't care about the doctrine that much -- I liked the fellowship."

She was inducted into the International Surfing Hall of Fame in 1991, and the Surfing Walk of Fame as that year's Woman of the Year; the Walk is in Huntington Beach, California. In 2000, she was ranked 99th on Sports Illustrated's list of the Top 100 Women Athletes of the 20th century. In 2001, she was inducted into the Hawai'i Sports Hall of Fame. In 2018, she received the “Silver Surfer Award”, a lifetime achievement award from the California Surf Museum.
