= Eddie Aikau =

Hawaiian surfer and lifeguard (1946-1978)

Personal information
- Born: May 4, 1946 Kahului, Territory of Hawaii, United States
- Years active: 1959–1978
- Height: 5 ft 10 in (178 cm)
- Weight: 180 lb (82 kg)
- Disappeared: March 17, 1978 (aged 31) off Molokai/Lanai, Hawaii, United States

Surfing career
- Sport: Surfing
- Sponsors: Polynesian Voyaging Society

Surfing specifications
- Stance: Regular (natural) foot
- Favorite waves: Waimea Bay (North Shore, Oahu), Sunset Beach (North Shore, Oahu), Pipeline (North Shore, Oahu)
- Disappeared: March 17, 1978 (aged 31) off Molokai/Lanai, Hawaii, United States

Edward Ryan Makuahanai Aikau (May 4, 1946 – March 17, 1978) was a Hawaiian lifeguard and surfer. As the first lifeguard at Waimea Bay on the island of Oahu, he saved over 500 people and became famous for surfing the big Hawaiian surf, winning several awards including the 1977 Duke Kahanamoku Invitational Surfing Championship. The Eddie Aikau Big Wave Invitational ("The Eddie") is named in his honor. He was also a crew member on the Polynesian voyaging canoe Hōkūleʻa, on which he died during an ill-fated journey in 1978.

== Life ==
Born in Kahului, Maui, Aikau was the third child of Solomon and Henrietta Aikau. The words Makua Hanai in Eddie Aikau's full name means feeding parent, an adoptive, nurturing, fostering parent, in the Hawaiian language. He was a descendant of Hewahewa, the kahuna nui (high priest) of King Kamehameha I and his successor Kamehameha II. Aikau first learned how to surf on the shorebreak of Kahului Harbor. He moved to Oʻahu with his family in 1959, and at the age of 16 left school and started working at the Dole pineapple cannery; the paycheck allowed Aikau to buy his first surfboard. In 1968, he became the first lifeguard hired by the City & County of Honolulu to work on the North Shore. The City & County of Honolulu gave Aikau the task of covering all of the beaches between Sunset and Haleiwa. Not one life was lost while he served as lifeguard of Waimea Bay, as he braved waves that often reached 30 feet (9.1 m) high or more, and saved the lives of more than 500 swimmers. In 1971, Aikau was named Lifeguard of the Year. In 1977 Aikau won the Duke Kahanamoku Invitational Surfing Championship.

On February 28, 1978, TV producer John Orland was the last person Aikau rescued at Waimea Bay.

== Lost at sea ==
In 1978, the Polynesian Voyaging Society was seeking volunteers for a 30-day, 2,500-mile (4,000 km) journey to re-enact the ancient route of the Polynesian migration between the Hawaiian and Tahitian island chains. Aikau joined the voyage as a crew member. The double-hulled voyaging canoe Hōkūleʻa left the Hawaiian islands on March 16, 1978. It developed a leak in one of its hulls and later capsized about twelve miles (19 km) south of the island of Molokaʻi. In an attempt to get help, Aikau paddled toward Lānaʻi on his surfboard. Although the rest of the crew were later rescued by the U.S. Coast Guard Cutter Cape Corwin, Aikau's body was never found. He removed his life jacket since it was hindering his paddling of the surfboard. The ensuing search for Aikau was the largest air–sea search in Hawaiian history.

== Memorial surfing invitational ==
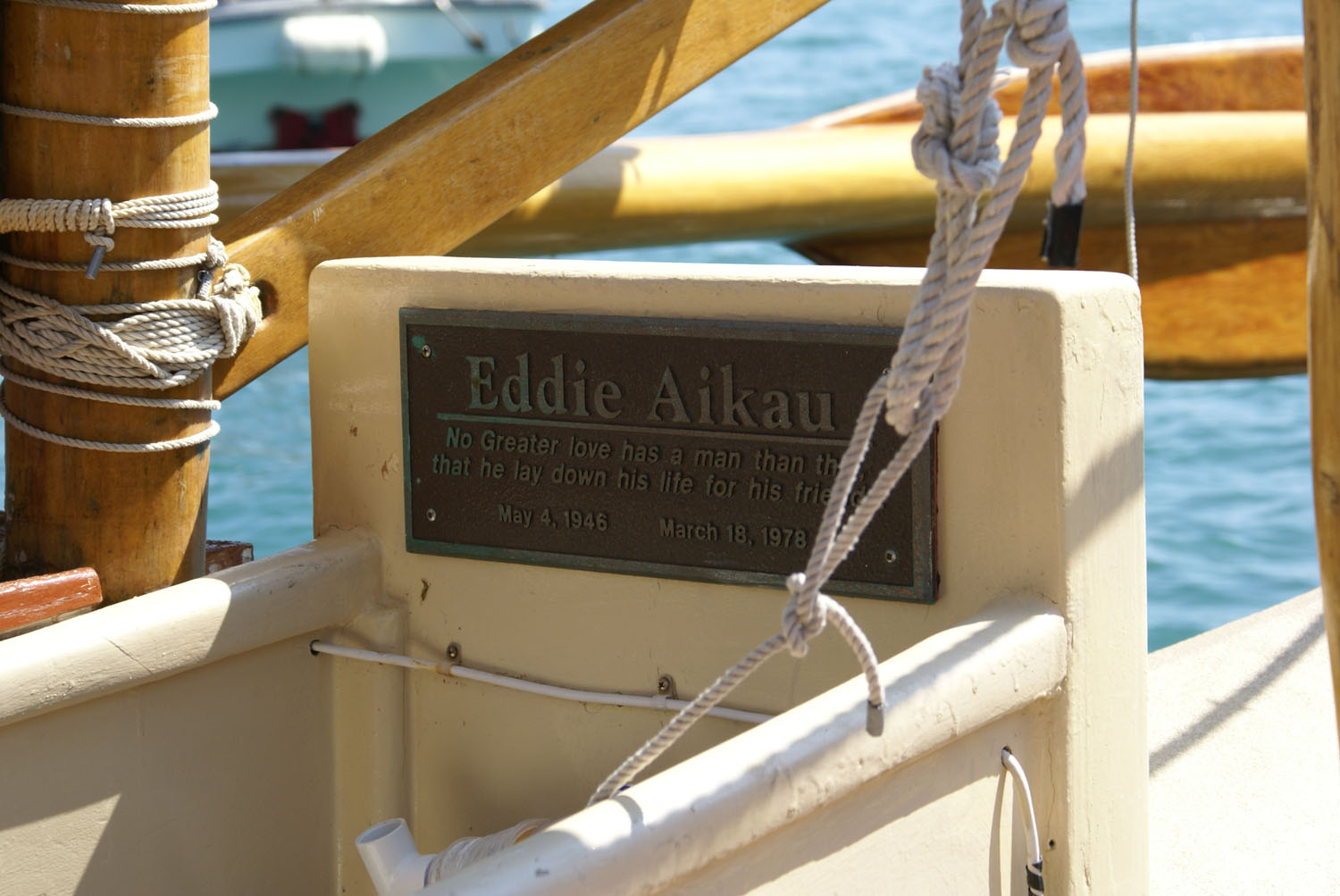
Memorial plate on Hokule'a

In Aikau's honor, the surfwear company Quiksilver sponsored “The Eddie” until 2016. The event was cancelled for 2017, but the Aikau family brought it back with largely local sponsors for 2018–19 as the Quiksilver Big Wave Invitational in Memory of Eddie Aikau at Waimea Bay.

Since its inception in 1985, the tournament has only been held 11 times due to a precondition that open-ocean swells reach a minimum of 20 feet (6.1 m), which translates to a wave face height of over 30 feet (9.1 m). The first Eddie was held at Sunset Beach in 1985 and was won by Denton Miyamura in January 1985. In its second year the tournament was moved to Waimea Bay, and was won by Eddie Aikau's younger brother Clyde in February 1986. The most recent tournament was held in December 2024, when waves in the bay reached the minimum of 20 to 30 feet (9.1 m) high. The contest invites only 28 big-wave riders to participate in two rounds of competition. The event does not allow the use of jet skis to tow surfers into the waves.

== ESPN documentary ==
In 2013 Sam George, an ex-professional surfer and filmmaker, directed a documentary for ESPN's 30 for 30 series about Aikau titled Hawaiian: The Legend of Eddie Aikau. The documentary premiered at the Tribeca Film Festival and on ESPN on October 1, 2013. The documentary details Aikau's life from childhood to his death and won an Emmy for Best Sports Documentary Series, making it one of the few surf-related films to ever receive such recognition.

At the completion of the film, George commented on Aikau:

The most surprising thing to learn was the ways in which Eddie Aikau was a hero in the most authentic sense of the word... Eddie put himself in harm’s way for the sake of others. He cared about others, from his first day on the job as a lifeguard at Waimea Bay to his very last moment, paddling to get help in an attempt to save his stricken crewmates. Eddie stood up for people he didn’t necessarily even like, all out of an inherent sense of fairness. It was a wonderful thing to discover that the legend was a true hero.

== Personal life ==
Aikau was the third of six children: Fred (eldest), Myra, Eddie, Gerald, Solomon, and the youngest Clyde. When the Aikau family moved to Oahu in 1959 they lived on a nine acre Chinese cemetery, named the Yee King Tong Cemetery, rent-free, in return for maintaining the grounds.

In the summer of 1970, Aikau met Linda Crosswhite, a tourist from Seattle. She was welcomed into the family and the two married in 1971 in a ceremony in Hawaii.

In 1973, Gerald Aikau, Eddie’s younger brother, a decorated Air Force serviceman who had been in Vietnam, and probably suffering from PTSD, died in a car accident when a friend who was driving fell asleep at the wheel while driving home from a party. Gerald's death devastated Eddie, affected his mental state, and eventually his marriage, and his wife Linda later separated from him. "There was a wall of grief between us," she later said. They remained married however until his death in 1978.

His younger brother Clyde was also a champion surfer and won "The Eddie" in its second year overall (1986) and first year at Waimea Bay. Eddie and Clyde are the only native Hawaiians to win the Duke Kahanamoku Invitational Surfing Championship.

== Popular culture ==
In the 1980s, bumper stickers and T-shirts with the phrase "Eddie Would Go" spread around the Hawaiian Islands and to the rest of the world. According to maritime historian Mac Simpson, "Aikau was a legend on the North Shore, pulling people out of waves that no one else would dare to. That's where the saying came from – Eddie would go, when no one else would or could. Only Eddie dared." The phrase originated during the first Eddie contest. The waves were huge and the conditions were extremely dangerous. While the contest organizers were discussing whether to put it on, Mark Foo looked at the conditions and said "Eddie would go." The phrase stuck.

Another variation of the aforementioned popular phrase is "Eddie wouldn't tow." This phrase is in reference to the method of big wave surfing in which one surfer must accelerate another surfer (the former on a jet ski, the latter towed on a surfboard) to the speed of a large, fast wave. It is also partially in response to the controversy over the "unnaturalness" of tow-in surfing; many surfers feel that being towed in to a wave, as opposed to paddling, is against the spirit of the sport.

Other variations of the phrase include "Eddie would throw" (in support of the University of Hawaiʻi's passing attack by Colt Brennan and Timmy Chang under head coach June Jones), "Eddie wouldn't crow" (in opposition to boastful and egotistical surfers), and "Eddie would hoe" (in support of Native Hawaiian agricultural outreach programs). Another variation used recently during the 2008 election campaign for Skyline was the slogan, "Eddie would ride."

Kailua-Kona, Hawaii musician Lopaka Rootz released a reggae single honoring Eddie Aikau called "Eddie." It debuted on Kapa Radio in December 2019. Rootzʻ music is played on Hawaiian radio station KWXX FM.

Eddie's story was humorously (and respectfully) told by comedian Kurt Braunohler in a second-season episode of Drunk History that was dedicated to Hawaiian history, which aired on August 12, 2014.

Eddie's story was told by Karen Kilgariff on episode 160 of the podcast My Favorite Murder, which aired February 14, 2019.

The character of Z in the animated movie Surf's Up is loosely based on Eddie's life and mysterious death.

On May 4, 2019, what would have been his 73rd birthday, he was honored with a Google Doodle.

In 2022, Aikau was featured in Naomi Hirahara's anthology We Are Here: 30 Inspiring Asian Americans and Pacific Islanders Who Have Shaped the United States that was published by the Smithsonian Institution and Running Press Kids.

== See also ==
- Duke Kahanamoku
- List of people who disappeared mysteriously at sea
