= Jimmy Blears =

American surfer (1948–2011)

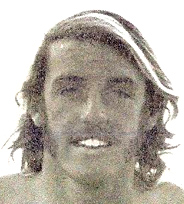

Personal information
- Born: James Blears, Jr. January 6, 1948 Santa Monica, California, United States
- Died: February 4, 2011 (aged 63) Honolulu, Hawaii, United States
- Years active: 1960s–1990s

Surfing career
- Sport: Surfing
- Best year: 1972
- Sponsors: Weber Surfboards
- Major achievements: 1972 IPS World Champion

Surfing specifications
- Stance: Goofy foot
- Favorite waves: Jockos

James Blears Jr (January 6, 1948 – February 4, 2011) was the 1972 World Surfing Champion.

== History ==
Jimmy Blears was born in California the oldest son of former NWA and WWA pro-wrestling champion, Lord James "Tally-Ho" Blears, also an avid surfer who appeared in the seminal surfing documentary, The Endless Summer. At the age of eleven Blears moved with his family to Hawaii, where he learned surfing from his father. During his career Blears was a professional C&C North Shore lifeguard for 25 years, as well as being a professional surfer.

Blears died in his sleep on February 4, 2011, in Honolulu, at the age of 63.

== Family ==
Blears' sister, Laura, was one of the world's top female surfers during the 1970s. His youngest brother, Clinton “Tallyho” Blears was also a noted professional surfer.

Achievements
Preceded by Rolf Aurness	ISF World Surfing Champion (men's); 1972	Succeeded by Ian Cairns
