= Smirnoff World Pro-Am Surfing Championships =

The Smirnoff World Pro-Am Surfing Championships was a surfing competition held between 1969 and 1977. Originally held at Santa Cruz, California, later events were held at various locations in Hawaii, primarily Sunset Beach on the island of Oʻahu. The event was organized by 1968 world champion surfer Fred Hemmings, who began promoting surf events in 1969.

The Smirnoff World Pro-Am became known by some as a de facto professional World Championship between 1973 and 1975, because the International Surfing Federation was unable to establish a format or sponsorship, and no official amateur championships were held in those years. Laura Lee Ching became the first woman to compete in the Hawaiian Smirnoff World Pro-Am contests in 1973.

Event Champions
Year	Men's	Women's
1969	Corky Carroll (USA)	Margo Godfrey (USA)
1970*	Nat Young (AUS)	
1971	Gavin Rudolph (RSA)	
1972*	Paul Neilsen (AUS)	
1973	Ian Cairns (AUS)	
1974	Reno Abellira (USA)	
1975	Mark Richards (AUS)	
1976**	Mark Warren (AUS)	Jericho Poppler (USA)
1977**	Reno Abellira (USA)	Jericho Poppler (USA)

The Smirnoff World Pro-Am Surfing Championships were superseded by the International Professional Surfers (IPS) in 1976.

- *ISA world surfing champions were Rolf Aurness in 1970 and Jimmy Blears in 1972.
- **IPS (later ASP/WSL) world surfing champions were Peter Townend in 1976 and Shaun Tomson / Margo Oberg (Godfrey) in 1977.
