= Mākaha Valley, Hawaii =

Census-designated place in Hawaii, United States

Mākaha Valley
- Census-designated place
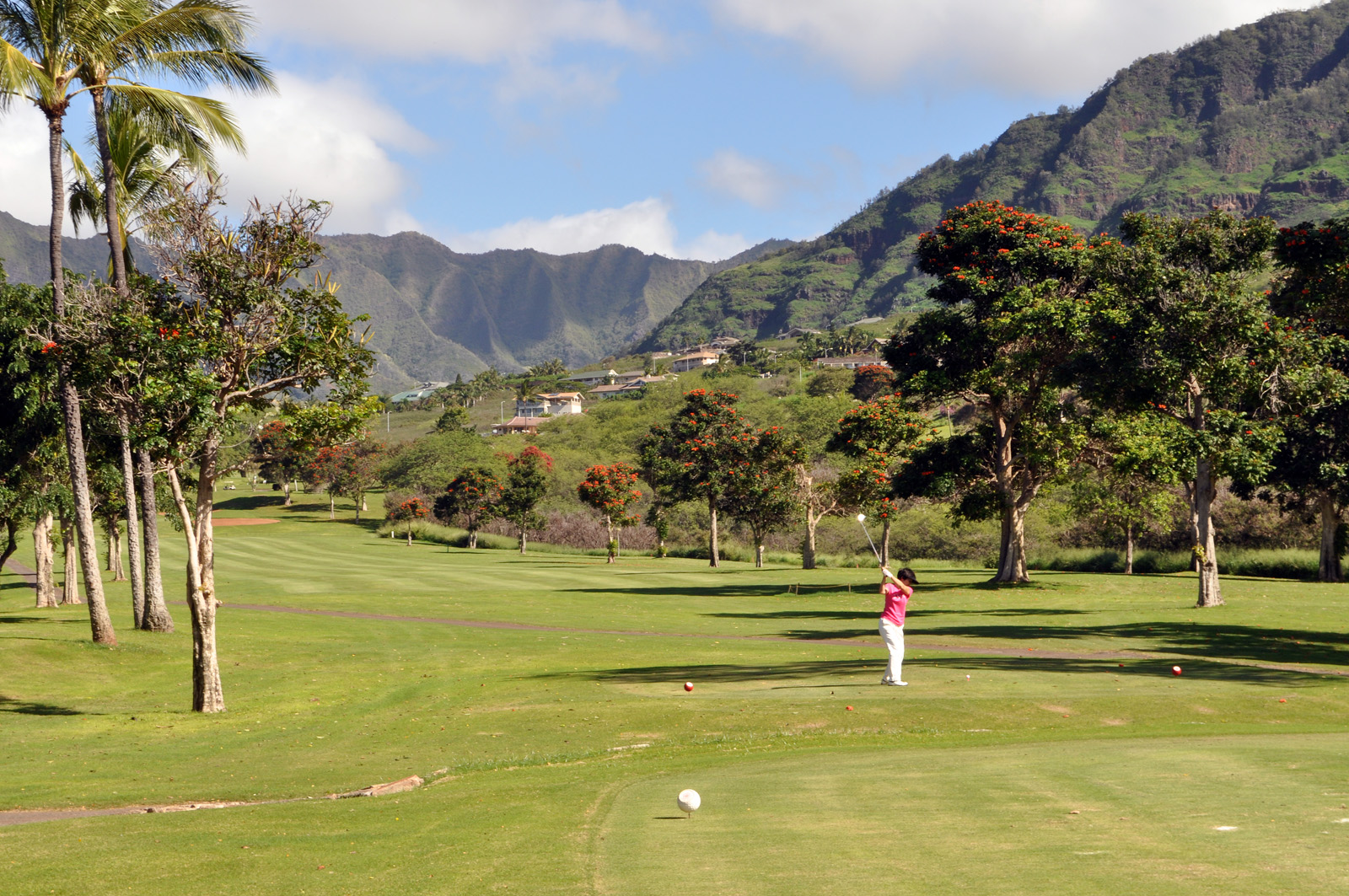
- Makaha Resort Golf Club in Mākaha Valley

- Location in Honolulu County and the state of Hawaii
- Coordinates: 21°28′59″N 158°12′14″W
- Country: United States
- State: Hawaii

Area
  - Total: 3.74 sq mi (9.68 km^{2})
  - Land: 3.74 sq mi (9.68 km^{2})
  - Water: 0 sq mi (0.00 km^{2})
- Elevation: 285 ft (87 m)

Population (2020)
  - Total: 198
  - Density: 52.9/sq mi (20.44/km^{2})
- Time zone: UTC-10 (Hawaii-Aleutian)
- ZIP code: 96792
- Area code: 808
- FIPS code: 15-47560
- GNIS feature ID: 1867257

Mākaha Valley is a census-designated place (CDP) in Honolulu County, Hawaiʻi, United States. The population was 198 at the 2020 census.

== Geography ==
Mākaha Valley is located at 21°28′59″N 158°12′14″W (21.483100, -158.203946).

According to the United States Census Bureau, the CDP has a total area of 4.1 square miles (10.7 km^{2}), all of it land.

== Demographics ==
Historical population
Census	Pop.	Note	%±
1990	1,012		—
2000	1,289		27.4%
2010	1,341		4.0%
2020	198		−85.2%

As of the census of 2000, there were 1,289 people, 426 households, and 311 families residing in the CDP. The population density was 1,176.0 inhabitants per square mile (454.1/km^{2}). There were 604 housing units at an average density of 551.0 per square mile (212.7/km^{2}). The racial makeup of the CDP was 19.16% White, 2.87% African American, 0.54% Native American, 7.99% Asian, 21.64% Pacific Islander, 2.02% from other races, and 45.77% from two or more races. Hispanic or Latino of any race were 17.92% of the population.

There were 426 households, out of which 49.5% had children under the age of 18 living with them, 36.9% were married couples living together, 28.6% had a female householder with no husband present, and 26.8% were non-families. 18.1% of all households were made up of individuals, and 3.1% had someone living alone who was 65 years of age or older. The average household size was 3.03 and the average family size was 3.38.

In the CDP the population was spread out, with 38.6% under the age of 18, 12.3% from 18 to 24, 31.8% from 25 to 44, 13.6% from 45 to 64, and 3.7% who were 65 years of age or older. The median age was 25 years. For every 100 females there were 96.8 males. For every 100 females age 18 and over, there were 85.2 males.

The median income for a household in the CDP was $27,446, and the median income for a family was $26,118. Males had a median income of $31,389 versus $24,063 for females. The per capita income for the CDP was $12,215. About 32.4% of families and 36.6% of the population were below the poverty line, including 45.8% of those under age 18 and none of those age 65 or over.
