= Mark Richards (surfer) =

Australian surfer (born 1957)

Mark Richards OAM (born 7 March 1957), known as MR, is an Australian surfer and surfboard shaper from Newcastle, New South Wales. He won four consecutive world surfing championships from 1979 to 1982. Richards developed the "Free Ride" twin-fin surfboard in the late 1970s, a design that later became highly influential in the evolution of modern high-performance surfing.

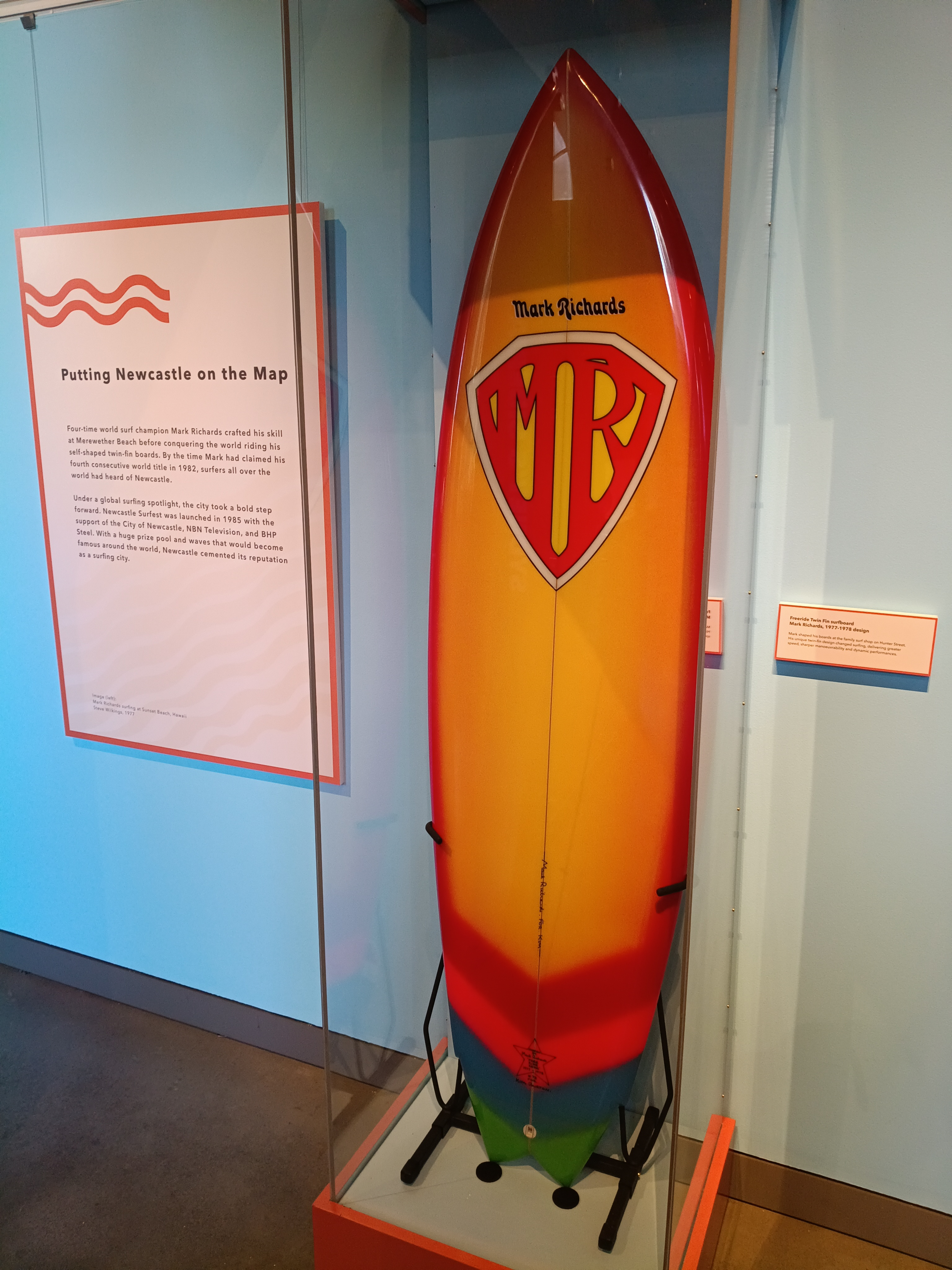
The "Free Ride" twin-fin surfboard shaped by Mark Richards, on display at Newcastle Museum.

== Youth ==
Mark Richards was born and raised in Newcastle, son of Ray and Val Richards, both keen beachgoers. They worked at the Wire Rope Works, Ray Richards as an accountant, but he wanted more than that career could offer and started a business selling second-hand cars at a time when new cars were too expensive for most people. Together they set up a showroom at the front of Hunter St and lived in an apartment above it.

In the late 1950s Ray saw the new balsa and fibreglass mailbu surfboards, which Greg Noll and other visiting Californians had brought with them in 1956. The new boards were shorter and more manoeuvrable than the solid timber boards used until then. He bought himself one, and when he saw how much it impressed people he made a decision to branch into selling them too, buying from early manufacturers in Sydney. So the business came a combination car yard and surf shop, and in time the cars gave way to the surfboards and it became a dedicated surf shop, one of the first in Australia.

So when Mark was born in 1957 he was always around surfboards, growing up with surf-o-planes and pint-sized longboards. He learnt to surf in gentle waves at Blacksmiths Beach, about 15 minutes south of Newcastle, a beach partly sheltered by the breakwater on the northern side of the entrance to Lake Macquarie. The family also went to Rainbow Bay on Queensland's Gold Coast for holidays, where he surfed Snapper Rocks. He was also very keen on cricket when young.

Richards surfed many junior competitions around Australia, taking time off school to go in some cases. He also made trips to Hawaii for winter on the North Shore as a teenager. The highlight of his junior career was a win at Margaret River in 1973.

In mid-1973 Richards father allowed him to leave school midway through fifth form, to pursue surfing. Anyone could leave after fourth form, but that was usually to take up an apprenticeship. To leave for surfing was radical at a time when surfers were regarded as long-haired layabouts. The deal with his father was that if it didn't work out in a year then he had to get a trade.

== Early career ==
At the end of 1974 Richards returned to Hawaii for the North Shore winter. This was his fourth trip, and his first taste of really big waves. He got a late entry into a contest at Waimea Bay, and did well enough on the first day of competition to make the semi-finals the next day. That day the surf had jumped and 30-foot clean-up sets were closing out the Bay. Even local big wave riders were saying it was too big to compete. Organiser and 1968 world title holder Fred Hemmings had other ideas; with sunshine, offshore winds and television coverage he threatened to go out himself if nobody else wanted to.

Richards made a decision to go. At 17 years old and without Waimea experience nobody would have thought less of him if he didn't, but he felt to walk away would end his hopes of surfing professionally, and put him back in Newcastle at some unappealing apprenticeship. He went with survival uppermost in his mind, and reckoned his first wave twice as big as anything he'd surfed before. By the end of the heat he was game enough on the monsters to actually bottom turn, yet was glad not to reach the final and have to go back out. In time he came to enjoy big waves, without being regarded as a big-wave specialist.

Image was important for Richards, and in 1975 he had Hawaiian artist Albert Dove design a superman-style badge with "MR" inscribed in it. He used that logo on all his boards and wetsuits for most of his career.

Richards was interested in twin-fin surfboards and in shaping. At the Surfabout in 1976 he saw Reno Abellira on a highly manoeuvrable twin-fin fish and thought something like that would be better than a single-fin for small waves. Back in Hawaii again for the 1976/77 winter, aged 19, he took his father's suggestion to pay for shaping lessons from noted pioneer Dick Brewer. It meant Richards was able to put his thoughts about design into actual foam. He credits Brewer for the style of shaping he came to use.

Brewer made Richards a twin-fin, and Richards took aspects of that and Abellira's fish for his own designs. Richard patented a bottom-turn/snapback combination set and developed the "Free Ride" twin-fin surfboard, a design that offered greater speed and manoeuvrability in small surf conditions than the single-fin surfboards common at the time.

== World championships ==
- 1975 Smirnoff World Pro-Am Surfing Championships;
- 1979 International Professional Surfers (IPS) World Champion;
- 1980 International Professional Surfers (IPS) World Champion;
- 1981 International Professional Surfers (IPS) World Champion;
- 1982 International Professional Surfers (IPS) World Champion
- 2001 Association of Surfing Professionals (ASP) Grandmasters World Champion

== Professional career ==
By 1979 Richards reckoned his career as shaping primarily, and just competing at home in Australia and in Hawaii where he would go for the northern winter anyway.

In Australia that year he had a strong win at the Stubbies, and another strong win in small waves at Bells Beach, but couldn't make a clean sweep at the Surfabout (relocated to Bells that year). The tour went to Niijima in Japan, the first time tour events had been held in Japan. Richards was not focused on title ratings points and might not have gone except he had a Japanese sponsor. In four events there in small waves Richards got a 1st, a 2nd and two 5ths, which put him well in the ratings lead.

Richards didn't go to the two-event South African leg, instead returning to Australia to make boards. Past world title winners hadn't reaped any great financial reward, so he reckoned he was better off putting his shaping first. So going into the last two events in Hawaii his lead had evaporated.

Richards came 4th in the Pipe Masters at Banzai Pipeline, which advanced him against Wayne Bartholomew and Cheyne Horan when they made early exits. Then at the World Cup at Haleiwa fortune smiled on him in good 6–8-foot swell. Bartholomew went out early, and another contender Dane Keoloha made a tactical error of waiting for big sets which didn't come and was out. It came down to the final, which was Peter Townend against Richards. If Townend won then Horan got the world title, and if Richards won then he got it.

In that final the two jostled for the inside position, both stubborn and wasting time out well past the break. His girlfriend (later wife) Jenny Jobson had arrived in Hawaii just in time for the final and thought he was going to be so stubborn that he'd give up the title rather than give up the inside. Finally Richards reckoned he was not in the lead and had to get some waves. He was so nervous he fell on a couple, but in the end did enough to take the win and take the title he hadn't even intended competing for.

The title presentation was in Haleiwa, and consisted only of a Rolex watch and a plaque with a Pan Am logo. But Surfing Magazine gave him the honour of a head-shot on the cover instead of their normal action shot, commissioned from rock photographer Norman Seef in Los Angeles.

For 1980 Richards changed his strategy, and set out deliberately to get a second world title, doing the full tour. Although he'd won the ratings in 1979 he wasn't universally thought the best surfer, with Dane Kealoha reckoned the best by many. Richards was also competing against Wayne Bartholomew, Cheyne Horan and Peter Townend. In the end his results were very strong and took the 1980 title by a record number of points, and ended the season as the surfer against whom others were judged.

Richards won in 1981 and 1982 too, with his chief rival being Cheyne Horan.

In 1982 Richards' main sponsor, Lightning Bolt, suddenly dropped him. The reason was a mystery, he'd just won his fourth world title and was at the peak of his popularity, but they declined to renew for another year. The Lightning Bolt Australia division reckoned that treatment shabby and signed him up for several years. It turned out the parent company was in severe financial trouble, and it in fact folded, putting most of its Hawaiian staff out of work.

Right through Richards' career his parents went with him to see him compete, within Australia at least. They preferred sitting in among the crowd, no doubt a little out of place among the teenagers and surfie types, even though they would have been welcome in the VIP areas. Richards and his parents were close and he would celebrate a win by having a meal with them, a marked contrast to surf and party animals of the time.

== Semi-retirement ==
For 1983 and following years Richards chose not to defend his title, and to travel and compete less, due to back troubles and the pressure of being on top. It turned out he was unable to compete for 1982 anyway, an ankle injury on a big day at home at Dixon Park kept him on dry land for five months.

Richards had suffered back problems throughout his career. His legs were a little shorter and trunk a little longer than usual which meant that he tended to pivot not at the hips but a couple of vertebrae up, straining the ligaments surrounding them. He reckoned a poor diet and lack of stretching or exercise (apart from surfing) hadn't helped either.

His back had developed a reverse curvature, with the lower vertebrae sticking out noticeably. He required regular physiotherapy to keep it mobile, and in later years it worsened to the point of making him something of a weekend surfer, since too much would aggravate it, obviously a very frustrating situation for a surfer.

Today Richards still lives in Newcastle with his wife, Jenny, and three children, Kyle, Nathan and Grace. He ran the Mark Richards Surf Shop in Hunter St, the same shop started by his parents until its closure on January 14th 2012.

== Honours ==
Richards was inducted into the Sport Australia Hall of Fame in 1985. He received a Medal of the Order of Australia in 1994, an Australian Sports Medal in 2000, and a Centenary Medal in 2001.

== See also ==
- Shaun Tomson
- Ian Cairns
- Bustin Down The Door

Achievements
Preceded by Wayne Bartholomew	International Professional Surfers World Champion (men's); 1979-82	Succeeded by Tom Carroll
Preceded by Reno Abellira	Smirnoff World Pro-Am Surfing Championships World Champion; 1975	Succeeded by Peter Townend
