= Peter Townend (surfer) =

Australian surfer

Peter Townend (born 1953), also known as PT, is an Australian surfer and first IPS/ASP World Surfing Champion.

== Early surfing years ==
Townend, born in Coolangatta, Queensland (Australia), was considered to be one of the best surfers in the world throughout the 1970s and 1980s. Townend had an extensive résumé apart from surfing, including movie stuntman, contest organizer, writer, publisher, marketer, and coach to future champions.

Townend began surfing in 1967 and attended his first competition in 1969. By this time he was already shaping boards as well as doing promotional work for Gordon and Smith Australia and working as a UPI journalist for the Sydney Daily Mirror. Townend was building a life in the surfing industry and simultaneously funding his travels. Townend was very competitive, as evidenced by his repeated contest performances at the Australian National Titles. He took 2nd in the juniors division in 1971 and then 2nd in the men’s division in 1972, 1973, 1974, and 1976. He later made history when, at 23 years old, he became the first IPS/ASP World Surfing Champion in 1976. Shortly afterwards Townend co-founded the Bronzed Aussies in an attempt to not only legitimize surfing, but build a global franchise and attract well-funded sponsors to the sport. Many surfers, however, did not accept the clean living lifestyle and the movement eventually fell apart. Townend spent much of 1977 riding waves as William Kat's stunt double in the filming of Big Wednesday. By 1978, Townend was again focused on competition with back-to-back IPS 5th-place finishes in 1978 and 1979. He finally took a much deserved first-place victory at the Hang Ten contest in Durban, South Africa in 1979.

== Other jobs ==
In the same year, Townend moved to Huntington Beach, California to serve as America's National Team coach and executive director. During his tenure, he coached many future world tour contenders including three-time world champion Tom Curren. He also coached the Americans to a win at the World Amateur Championships. By 1984, Townend had begun working for Surfing Magazine, eventually moving up to associate publisher and advertising director. This led to a position as marketing director for Rusty surf wear in 1999. He also got a job as the voice for Prime Ticket and ESPN as a colour commentator for the Association of Surfing Professionals World Championship Tour and the Bud Pro Surfing Tour. Townend was president of the Surf Industry Manufacturers Association (SIMA) for two years and helped found Surfing America, "an organization that oversees ASP North America and the Fosters Pro Surfing Tour and helps focus amateur surfers towards professional competition". As of 2010, Townend serves on the board of directors for USA Skateboarding with the goal to get skateboarding into the Olympics and is founder and owner of ActivEmpire, a company which specializes in action sports brand and media consultancy, coaching, athlete management and promotions.

== Awards ==
Townend was inducted into the Huntington Beach Walk of Fame in 1998 and the Australian Surfing Hall of Fame in 2001, as well as the International Surfing Hall of Fame. He received the lifetime achievement award from SIMA in 2013.

Achievements
Preceded by Mark Richards	International Professional Surfers World Champion; 1976	Succeeded by Shaun Tomson
