= Jeff Hakman =

American surfer

Jeffrey Hakman
- Born: 1948; Redondo Beach, California
- Other name: Jeff
- Occupations: Businessman; Surfer
- Known for: Co-founder, Quicksilver USA

Jeffrey "Jeff" Hakman is an American world surfing champion, now a businessman, who together with friend Bob McKnight convinced Alan Green, the co-founder of Quiksilver (then a small surf company from Torquay, Australia) to allow them the rights to trade the name in America in 1976.

Hakman started surfing in 1956 at age eight in Palos Verdes, California and at the age of ten moved to Hawaii with his parents. He surfed Waimea Bay at fourteen years old and at seventeen won the prestigious surfing title, Duke Kahanamoku Invitational Surfing Championship. Hakman graduated from Punahou School in 1967. Between the ages of 21 and 27 he won the most major surfing titles in the world including the first Pipe Masters at Banzai Pipeline, 1976 Bells Beach and was the unofficial World Champion in 1974 and 1975.

In 1976 Hakman founded Quiksilver America with Bob McKnight and in 1984 founded Quiksilver Europe with Harry Hodge, Brigitte Darrigrand and John Winship. He is currently the Marketing Director for NaPali SA (Quiksilver) in France. He is a 2009 inductee into the Surfers' Hall of Fame in Huntington Beach, California.
