= Mākaha, Hawaii =

Census-designated place in Hawaii, United States

Mākaha
- Census-designated place
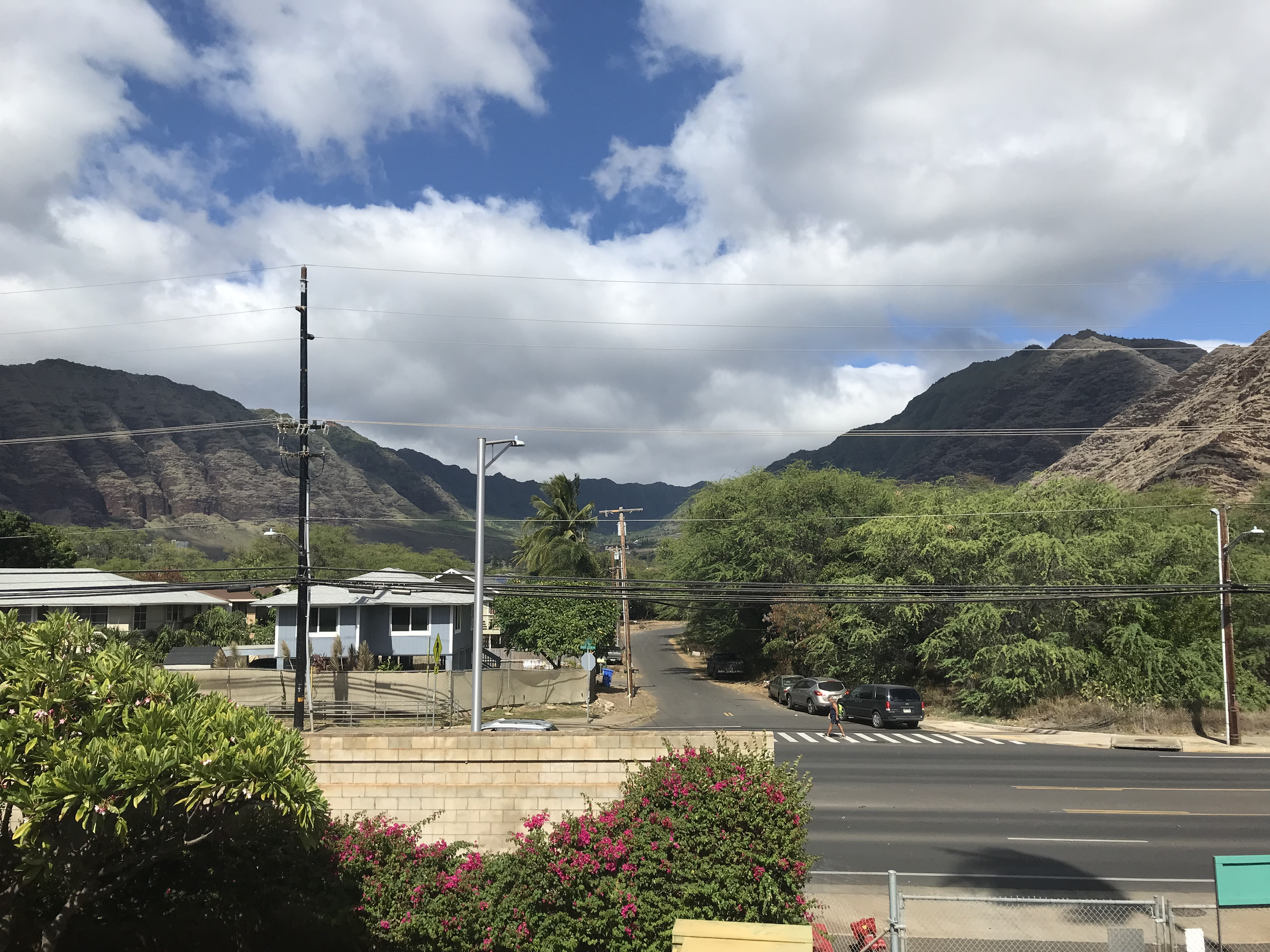
- View of Mākaha Valley

- Location in Honolulu County and the state of Hawaii
- Coordinates: 21°28′14″N 158°12′51″W
- Country: United States
- State: Hawaii

Area
  - Total: 5.56 sq mi (14.39 km^{2})
  - Land: 2.69 sq mi (6.97 km^{2})
  - Water: 2.86 sq mi (7.42 km^{2})
- Elevation: 20 ft (6 m)

Population (2020)
  - Total: 9,916
  - Density: 3,686.2/sq mi (1,423.25/km^{2})
- Time zone: UTC-10 (Hawaii-Aleutian)
- ZIP code: 96792
- Area code: 808
- FIPS code: 15-47450
- GNIS feature ID: 0362017

Historically, Mākaha was an ahupuaʻa, or area of land ruled by chief or king and managed by the members of the ʻaliʻi.

Mākaha (Hawaiian for "fierce", or "savage", pronounced [maːˈkɐhə]) is a census-designated place (CDP) in Honolulu County, Hawaiʻi, United States. It is a town located along the Pacific coast, west of the Mākaha Valley, and at the foot of Mount Ka'ala in the Wai’anae Mountain Range. It is the last of the leeward towns on Oahu. North of Mākaha there is no development, i.e. no towns, no gas stations, or restaurants. The population of Mākaha was 8,278 at the 2010 census. It is located 35 miles northwest of Honolulu, but is a part of Honolulu County.

In the Hawaiian language its name means “fierce” or “savage”, which refers to the group of bandits who were based in the Mākaha Valley. They would hide and wait for unsuspecting passersby to show up, and then plunder and pillage them. Mākaha has a higher percentage of Native Hawaiians and other Pacific islanders than most settlements on O’ahu; 26.2% of the population were Pacific Islanders in 2010. Mākaha Resort stages weekend traditional Hawaiian arts and crafts fairs and other Hawaiian cultural programs in order to preserve the Native Hawaiian traditions in Mākaha.

The town is particularly known for its surfing waves and surfing history, the Hawaiian temple Kāne’āki Heiau, and Mākaha Beach Park, which is a nesting place for several species of sea turtles. Aside from surfing, other water activities include diving, canoe-surfing, fishing, tandem surfing, bodysurfing, and other recreational water sports. Kāne’āki Heiau is Hawaii's most thoroughly restored ancient heiau, it was excavated by Bishop Museum archeologists in 1970 and can now be visited Tuesdays-Sundays. It originated as an agricultural temple to the god Lono in the 15th century. 200 years later, it was converted into a luakini, where human sacrifices were dedicated to the god Kū – a typical progression indicating Mākaha now supported a large enough population to have its own chief.

== Geography ==
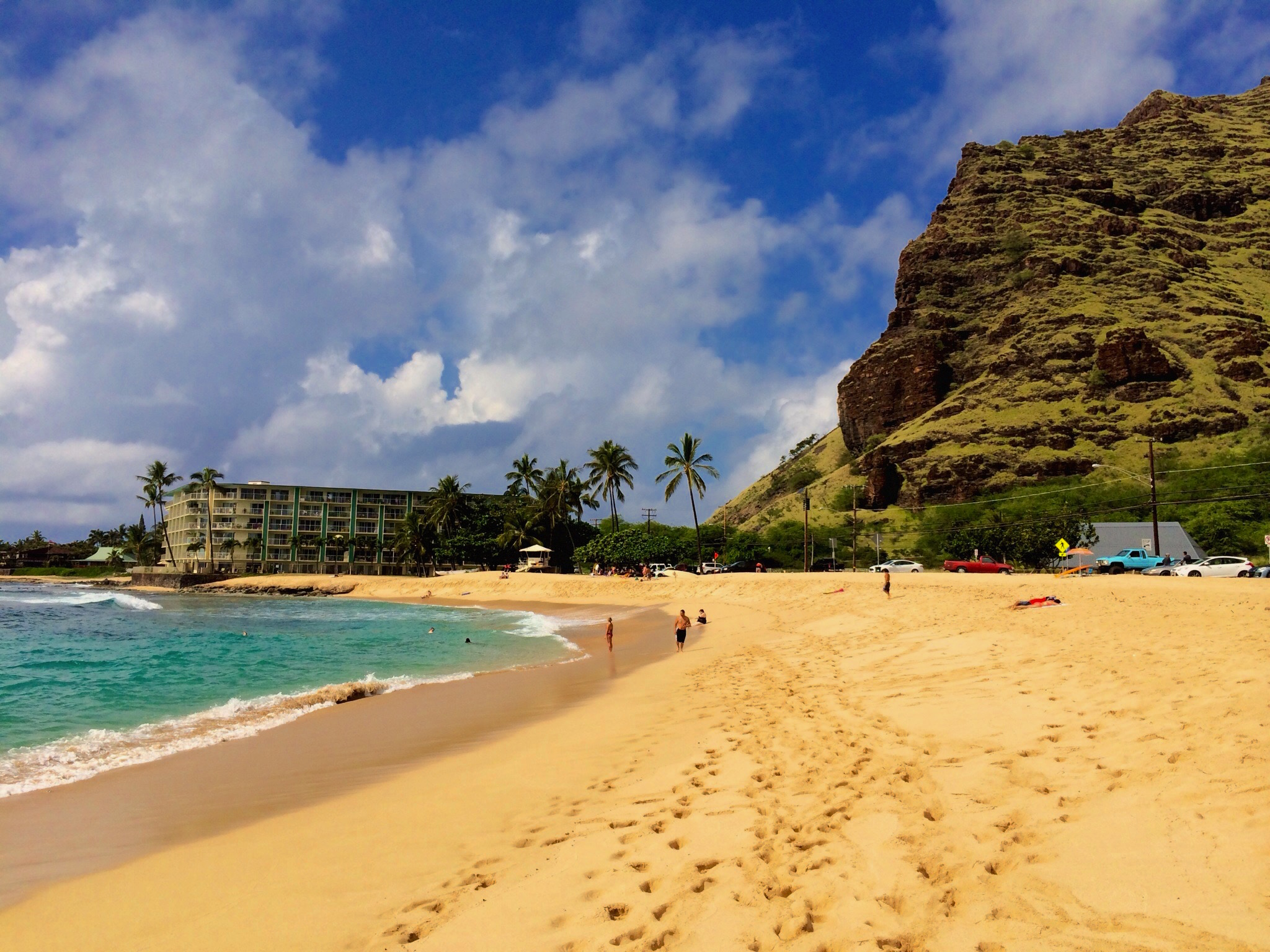
Mākaha Beach Park with the slopes of the Waiʻanae Range on the right

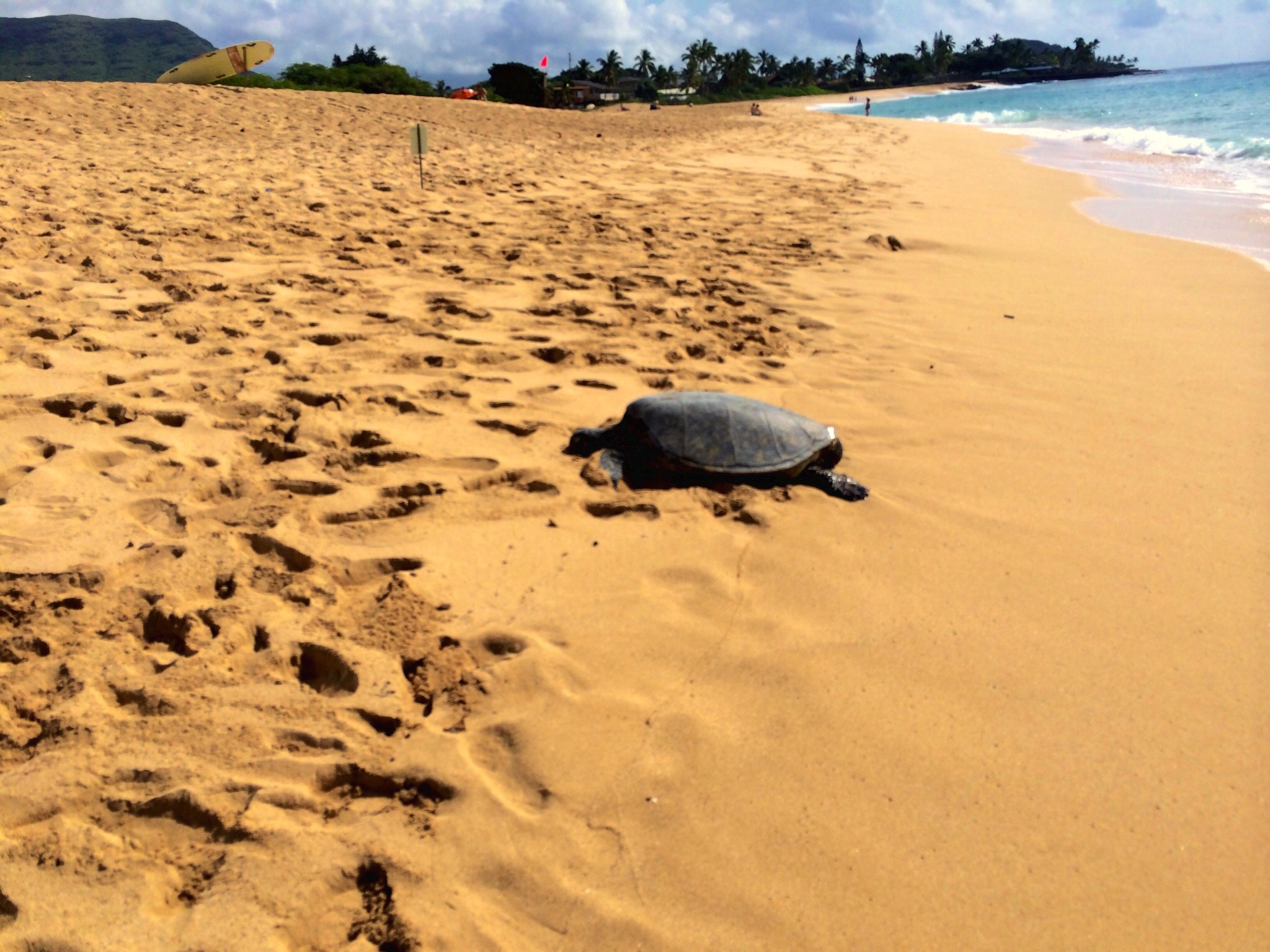
Green sea turtle at Mākaha Beach Park, January 2014

Mākaha is located at 21°28′14″N 158°12′51″W (21.470569, -158.214159). According to the United States Census Bureau, the CDP has a total area of 5.2 square miles (13 km^{2}), of which 2.3 square miles (6.0 km^{2}) is land and 2.9 square miles (7.5 km^{2}), or 55.53%, is water. Mākaha is the last town going northbound on the leeward side of Oahu, and is a part of Honolulu County. It is located at the bottom of the Waiʻanae Range, adjacent to the Pacific Ocean in the west and the Mākaha Valley to the east. It is located at the foot of Mount Ka'ala, which is just east of Mākaha and is the highest point on the island of O'ahu at 4,020 feet.

To get here by public transportation, the express city bus C (Route C – Country Express) is the most direct option, as it stays along the coast. The Bus 40 goes up Mākaha Valley Road to the golf courses and then goes down Kili Drive to Mākaha Beach Park. It leaves daily from the Ala Moana Center in Downtown Honolulu. By car, you would want to follow Kamehameha Highway just north off Pearl Harbor, and then onto Farrington Highway (93) in the west. You would want to follow Farrington Highway northbound on Oahu's west shore until you pass the neighboring town of Waianae. The town of Mākaha is next, and the last one of the leeward towns on Oahu. Mākaha Beach Park in the town center is located on 84-369 Farrington Hwy, Mākaha HI 96792.

== Surfing ==
Mākaha was the site of the Mākaha International Surfing Championships 1954–1971. During the '60s, Fred Hemmings won the championship four times.

Surfing is sometimes recognized as starting in Mākaha in the early 1950s, even though it has most likely been utilized as a surfing spot for Native Hawaiians for hundreds of years. During summer, the waves tend to be at maximum four feet; however, during the winter surf season, the waves often exceed fifteen feet. Attracted by these waves, sometimes as high as 25 feet high, the Waikīkī Surf Club established the Mākaha International Surfing Championships in 1952, the first of the many international surfing contests that are now held in Hawaii. One of the most popular events still held at Mākaha is Buffalo's Big Board Contest, an annual surf contest named in honor of Mākaha lifeguard and surfing legend Richard “Buffalo” Keaulana. In these waters, Buffalo not only invented some of the most outrageous methods of surfing, but also raised his world champion son Rusty. He also made Mākaha the home of the world's first international surf meet in 1954 and still hosts his Big Board Surfing Classic. Rell Sunn's Menehune Triple Lei of Surfing is another annual surfing event that finds place in Mākaha. Besides Mākaha Beach Park, other surfing areas in Mākaha includes for instance Aki's Beach, the Blowhole, Bowl, Charlie's Reef, and Cornets. water

== Demographics ==
Historical population
Census	Pop.	Note	%±
2020	9,916		—
U.S. Decennial Census

As of the census of 2000, there were 7,753 people, 2,388 households, and 1,721 families residing in the CDP. The population density was 3,324.7 inhabitants per square mile (1,283.7/km^{2}). There were 3,208 housing units at an average density of 1,375.7 per square mile (531.2/km^{2}). The racial makeup of the CDP was 19.00% White, 1.39% African American, 0.71% Native American, 15.23% Asian, 21.90% Pacific Islander, 1.63% from other races, and 40.14% from two or more races. Hispanic or Latino of any race were 17.86% of the population.

There were 2,388 households, out of which 37.8% had children under the age of 18 living with them, 44.9% were married couples living together, 19.6% had a female householder with no husband present, and 27.9% were non-families. 20.8% of all households were made up of individuals, and 5.3% had someone living alone who was 65 years of age or older. The average household size was 3.20 and the average family size was 3.70.

In the CDP the population was spread out, with 31.7% under the age of 18, 11.3% from 18 to 24, 26.1% from 25 to 44, 20.5% from 45 to 64, and 10.3% who were 65 years of age or older. The median age was 30 years. For every 100 females there were 98.9 males. For every 100 females age 18 and over, there were 95.1 males.

The median income for a household in the CDP was $35,674, and the median income for a family was $36,563. Males had a median income of $34,081 versus $24,606 for females. The per capita income for the CDP was $14,267. About 22.3% of families and 23.9% of the population were below the poverty line, including 32.8% of those under age 18 and 9.3% of those age 65 or over.

== Climate ==
Mākaha has a tropical savanna climate (Köppen: Aw).

Climate data for Makaha
Month	Jan	Feb	Mar	Apr	May	Jun	Jul	Aug	Sep	Oct	Nov	Dec	Year
Mean daily maximum °C (°F)	23.3 (73.9)	23.1 (73.6)	23.2 (73.8)	23.9 (75.0)	24.9 (76.8)	25.9 (78.6)	26.4 (79.5)	26.7 (80.1)	26.8 (80.2)	26.1 (79.0)	25.1 (77.2)	24.0 (75.2)	25.0 (76.9)
Daily mean °C (°F)	22.4 (72.3)	22.0 (71.6)	22.1 (71.8)	22.8 (73.0)	23.6 (74.5)	24.5 (76.1)	25.0 (77.0)	25.3 (77.5)	25.4 (77.7)	25.0 (77.0)	24.1 (75.4)	23.1 (73.6)	23.8 (74.8)
Mean daily minimum °C (°F)	21.6 (70.9)	21.2 (70.2)	21.2 (70.2)	21.9 (71.4)	22.7 (72.9)	23.5 (74.3)	24.0 (75.2)	24.3 (75.7)	24.4 (75.9)	24.1 (75.4)	23.3 (73.9)	22.4 (72.3)	22.9 (73.2)
Average precipitation mm (inches)	33.6 (1.32)	33.5 (1.32)	43.9 (1.73)	17.4 (0.69)	15.0 (0.59)	10.9 (0.43)	7.8 (0.31)	11.1 (0.44)	9.3 (0.37)	22.1 (0.87)	30.3 (1.19)	49.0 (1.93)	283.9 (11.19)
Source: Weather.Directory

== Education ==
The Hawaii State Department of Education operates the public schools. Mākaha Elementary School is in the CDP, while Kamaile Elementary School is outside of the CDP.

Waianae High School, which has a Waianae postal address, is physically located in two CDPs: mostly in Mākaha, and partially in Waianae.

== Notable people ==
- Israel Kamakawiwoʻole (1959–1997) – musician, singer, and activist
- Brian Keaulana – surfer, lifeguard, waterman, and actor
- Rusty Keaulana – longboard surfrider
- Yancy Medeiros (b. 1987) – mixed martial artist
- Greg Noll (1937–2021) – big wave surfer
- Rell Sunn (1950–1998) – world surfing champion
- Dalani Tanahy (b. 1961) – textile artist
