= Michael Peterson (surfer) =

Australian surfer

- Born: 24 September 1952
- Died: 29 March 2012 (aged 59); Tweed Heads South, New South Wales, Australia
- Occupation: Surfer
- Years active: 1973–2012

Michael "MP" Peterson (24 September 1952 – 29 March 2012), nicknamed "The King of Kirra", was a professional Australian surfer, regarded as one of the country's leading surfers during the early to mid-1970s.

== Early life ==
Michael Peterson was born on 24 September 1952 into a working-class family and lived in several locations before the family settled in Coolangatta on Queensland's Gold Coast when he was 15. He lived there with his mother, Joan, his younger brother, Tommy, and his younger sisters, Dorothy (Dot) and Denice.

== Surfing career ==
Peterson began surfing on "surf-o-planes," an inflatable rubber mat device invented in 1932, before progressing to a "Coolite," a board made from polystyrene beaded foam introduced in the early 1970s.

Peterson got his first surfboard in 1966 by retrieving broken and abandoned boards that had washed up on the rocks at Greenmount Beach. Since leg ropes had not yet been introduced, surfers often lost their boards in the waves, allowing people like Peterson to collect the remains. He and his brother would take the damaged boards home, make rough repairs, and return to the water to test them.

Peterson was particularly known for his deep tube riding skill at Kirra on the Gold Coast, Australia; for this, he earned the nickname "The King of Kirra". He was the Australian champion in the years 1972 and 1974 and won several other major surfing competitions.

== In film ==
Peterson appeared in Albe Falzon's 1971 film Morning of the Earth.

Jolyon Hoff's made a feature documentary biopic about him, titled Searching For Michael Peterson, released in 2009.

== Later life, death and legacy ==
Later in life, Peterson was diagnosed with schizophrenia.

On 29 March 2012, he died of a heart attack whilst inside his Australian home at Tweed Heads South, New South Wales; he was 59 years of age.

Peterson was honoured with a memorial service on 14 April 2012 at Kirra, with Mick Fanning, Rabbit Bartholomew, and Kelly Slater in attendance. Doug 'Claw' Warbrick addressed the crowd of 500 cheering mourners at the send-off.

A memorial to Peterson was erected at Marine Parade, Big Groyne, Kirra Point, dedicated on 1 March 2014.
