= Rip Curl Pro =

Australian surfing competition

- Current season, competition or edition: Rip Curl Pro Bells Beach 2025
- Sport: Surfing
- Country: Australia
- Most recent champions: (Brazil) Miguel Pupo (Men) (Hawaii) Gabriela Bryan (Women)
- Most titles: (Australia) Mick Fanning, (United States) Kelly Slater, (Australia) Mark Richards - 4 titles (Men) (Australia) Gail Couper - 10 titles (Women)
- Website: ,

The Rip Curl Pro, formerly the Bells Beach Surf Classic, is a WSL (formerly ASP) World Tour surfing competition held in and around Torquay, Victoria and sponsored by surf company Rip Curl. The event is based at Bells Beach, Victoria, Australia. The event winner is awarded the prestigious 'Bell' trophy. It is the longest running professional surfing competition in the world.

The song "Hells Bells" by AC/DC is played every morning before the first competition.

== History ==
The competition has been held annually at Easter time at Bells Beach, Victoria continuously since 1962, becoming a professional competition and sponsored by Rip Curl in 1973. The contest has had various sponsors over the years, including in 1984 Australian rock band, Australian Crawl.

The first Bells Beach contest was supposed to be held in late 1961 but was delayed until the Australia day weekend of 1962. The first winner was NSW surfer Glynn Ritchie. Occasionally George "Ming" Smith is credited as winning the 1961 event but he actually won the "wave of the day" in the first contest (1962) and was awarded a prize of 1 pound, and a pennant saying "winner 1961".

The event became mobile from 1993, and was held at various locations in Victoria, depending upon weather conditions. The entire 2005 event was held at Phillip Island due to poor conditions in Torquay. The event is now held only at Bells Beach and nearby Winkipop.

The famous Bells trophy was designed and built by Bells Beach local Joe Sweeney. The first time a Bell trophy was awarded was 1968. Winners of the Rip Curl Pro receive smaller replica Bells trophies to keep. Each year, Rip Curl founder Doug 'Claw' Warbrick presents the trophies to the winning athletes.

The 2020 and 2021 contests were cancelled due to the COVID-19 pandemic.

== Naming ==
Since the birth of this competition it had different names, such as the Bells Beach Easter Classic.

== Results ==
=== Men ===
Men
Year	Winner	Nation	Score	Runner-Up	Nation	Score	Prizemoney
2026	Miguel Pupo	Brazil	15.60	Yago Dora	Brazil	13.90	$80,000
2025	Jack Robinson	Australia	13.50	Kanoa Igarashi	Japan	12.80	$80,000
2024	Cole Houshmand	United States	13.50	Griffin Colapinto	United States	12.80	$80,000
2023	Ethan Ewing	Australia	14.50	Ryan Callinan	Australia	11.00	$80,000
2022	Filipe Toledo	Brazil	14.74	Callum Robson	Australia	12.94	$80,000
2021	Not Held		-	-		-	-
2020	Not Held		-	-		-	-
2019	John John Florence	Hawaii	14.30	Filipe Toledo	Brazil	13.83	$607,800
2018	Italo Ferreira	Brazil	15.66	Mick Fanning	Australia	12.83	$607,800
2017	Jordy Smith	South Africa	18.90	Caio Ibelli	Brazil	17.46	$579,000
2016	Matt Wilkinson	Australia	17.37	Jordy Smith	South Africa	14.16	$551,000
2015	Mick Fanning (4)	Australia	15.27	Adriano De Souza	Brazil	15.27	$525,000
2014	Mick Fanning (3)	Australia	16.83	Taj Burrow	Australia	13.26	$450,000
2013	Adriano De Souza	Brazil	16.26	Nat Young	United States	15.83	$450,000
2012	Mick Fanning (2)	Australia	18.80	Kelly Slater	United States	18.07	$425,000
2011	Joel Parkinson (3)	Australia	18.53	Mick Fanning	Australia	13.25	$425,000
2010	Kelly Slater (4)	United States	17.03	Mick Fanning	Australia	12.00	$400,000
2009	Joel Parkinson (2)	Australia	17.40	Adam Robertson	Australia	13.37	$320,000
2008	Kelly Slater (3)	United States	15.63	Bede Durbidge	Australia	15.16	$320,000
2007	Taj Burrow	Australia	16.83	Andy Irons	Hawaii	14.73	$300,000
2006	Kelly Slater (2)	United States	15.44	Joel Parkinson	Australia	13.83	$280,000
2005	Trent Munro	Australia	16.57	Andy Irons	Hawaii	15.07	$270,000
2004	Joel Parkinson	Australia	17.13	Taj Burrow	Australia	14.04	$250,000
2003	Andy Irons (2)	Hawaii	17.57	Joel Parkinson	Australia	15.40	$250,000
2002	Andy Irons	Hawaii	24.45	Sunny Garcia	Hawaii	22.65	$250,000
2001	Mick Fanning	Australia	20.85	Danny Wills	Australia	19.15	$250,000
2000	Sunny Garcia (3)	Hawaii	23.05	Flavio Padaratz	Brazil	21.00	$135,600
1999	Shane Dorian	Hawaii	24.75	Sunny Garcia	Hawaii	23.65	$120,600
1998	Mark Occhilupo	Australia	24.25	Shane Dorian	Hawaii	19.80	$120,600
1997	Matt Hoy	Australia	26.50	Damien Hardman	Australia	21.80	$120,600
1996	Sunny Garcia (2)	Hawaii	30.80	Todd Prestage	Australia	29.15	$105,000
1995	Sunny Garcia	Hawaii	34.70	John Shimooka	Hawaii	33.00	$105,000
1994	Kelly Slater	United States	29.70	Martin Potter	Australia	28.30	$105,000
1993	Damien Hardman (2)	Australia	22.00	Barton Lynch	Australia	20.00	$100,000
1992	Richie Collins	United States	30.00	Martin Potter	United Kingdom	27.00	$100,000
1991	Barton Lynch	Australia	71.80	Damien Hardman	Australia	68.80	$125,000
1990	Tom Curren (2)	United States	111.3	Dave Macaulay	Australia	100.8	$92,500
1989	Martin Potter	United Kingdom	123.5	Damien Hardman	Australia	113.3	$66,500
1988	Damien Hardman	Australia	126.6	Tom Carroll	Australia	114.1	$42,000
1987	Nick Wood	Australia	3	Richard Marsh	Australia	2	$35,000
1986	Tom Carroll	Australia	5	Tom Curren	United States	0	$30,000
1985	Tom Curren	United States	2	Richard Cram	Australia	1	$25,000
1984	Cheyne Horan	Australia	2	Tom Carroll	Australia	0	$25,000
1983	Joe Engel	Australia		Wes Laine	United States		
1982	Mark Richards (4)	Australia		Tom Carroll	Australia		$20,000
1981	Simon Anderson (2)	Australia		Cheyne Horan	Australia		$16,000
1980	Mark Richards (3)	Australia		Wayne Bartholomew	Australia		$15,100
1979	Mark Richards (2)	Australia		Wayne Bartholomew	Australia		$11,200
1978	Mark Richards	Australia		Wayne Bartholomew	Australia		$14,450
1977	Simon Anderson	Australia		Peter Drouyn	Australia		$9,500
1976	Jeff Hakman	Hawaii		Ian Cairns	Australia		$6,000
1975	Michael Peterson (3)	Australia		Shaun Tomson	South Africa		
1974	Michael Peterson (2)	Australia		Peter Drouyn	Australia		
1973	Michael Peterson	Australia		Midget Farrelly	Australia		
1972	Terry Fitzgerald	Australia		Peter Drouyn	Australia		
1971	Paul Neilsen	Australia		Peter Drouyn	Australia		
1970	Nat Young (3)	Australia		Ted Spencer	Australia		
1969	Ted Spencer (2)	Australia		Frank Latta	Australia		
1968	Ted Spencer	Australia		Keith Paull	Australia		
1967	Nat Young (2)	Australia		Peter Drouyn	Australia		
1966	Nat Young	Australia					
1965	Robert Conneely	Australia		Nat Young	Australia		
1964	Mick Dooley	Australia					
1963	Doug Andrew	Australia					
1962	Glynn Ritchie	Australia					
1961*	George "Ming" Smith	Australia					£1 ($2) Note: Smith won "wave of the day", not the actual final and the 1961 event was actually held in 1962.

=== Women ===
Women
Year	Winner	Nation	Score	Runner-Up	Nation	Score	Prizemoney
2026	Gabriela Bryan	Hawaii	14.83	Molly Picklum	Australia	8.33	$80,000
2025	Isabella Nichols	Australia	16.26	Luana Silva	Brazil	12.67	$80,000
2024	Caitlin Simmers	United States	12.77	Johanne Defay	France	11.60	$80,000
2023	Tyler Wright (2)	Australia	16.00	Molly Picklum	Australia	12.00	$80,000
2022	Tyler Wright	Australia	16.93	Carissa Moore	Hawaii	10.57	$80,000
2021	Not held	-		-	-	-	-
2020	Not held	-		-	-	-	-
2019	Courtney Conlogue (3)	United States	15.83	Malia Manuel	Hawaii	14.84	$420,800
2018	Stephanie Gilmore (4)	Australia	14.17	Tatiana Weston-Webb	Brazil	13.94	$298,900
2017	Courtney Conlogue (2)	United States	17.00	Stephanie Gilmore	Australia	16.33	$289,500
2016	Courtney Conlogue	United States	16.53 (9.03)	Sally Fitzgibbons	Australia	16.43 (8.33)	$275,500
2015	Carissa Moore (3)	Hawaii	14.00	Stephanie Gilmore	Australia	13.27	$262,500
2014	Carissa Moore (2)	Hawaii	15.73	Tyler Wright	Australia	14.10	$250,000
2013	Carissa Moore	Hawaii	11.00	Tyler Wright	Australia	6.94	$120,000
2012	Sally Fitzgibbons (2)	Australia	10.76	Stephanie Gilmore	Australia	10.33	$110,000
2011	Sally Fitzgibbons	Australia	16.77	Carissa Moore	Hawaii	15.40	$110,000
2010	Stephanie Gilmore (3)	Australia	14.67	Sofia Mulanovich	Peru	10.00	$100,000
2009	Silvana Lima	Brazil	17.34	Stephanie Gilmore	Australia	13.06	$90,000
2008	Stephanie Gilmore (2)	Australia	16.50	Sofia Mulanovich	Peru	16.17	$85,000
2007	Stephanie Gilmore	Australia	16.50	Sofia Mulanovich	Peru	11.93	$80,000
2006	Not held	-		-	-	-	-
2005	Sofia Mulanovich	Peru	15.83	Serena Brooke	Australia	11.83	$65,000
2004	Not held	-		-	-	-	-
2003	Not held	-		-	-	-	-
2002	Not held	-		-	-	-	-
2001	Neridah Falconer	Australia		-	-	-	-
2000	Megan Abubo	Hawaii	18.90	Rochelle Ballard	Hawaii	18.75	$30,000
1999	Layne Beachley (3)	Australia	21.25	Sandie Dryden	Australia	17.40	$30,000
1998	Layne Beachley (2)	Australia	24.50	Prue Jeffries	Australia	21.90	$30,000
1997	Lisa Andersen (4)	United States	26.00	Pam Burridge	Australia	23.65	$35,000
1996	Pauline Menczer (3)	Australia	22.30	Lisa Andersen	United States	22.25	$25,000
1995	Lisa Andersen (3)	United States	27.10	Pauline Menczer	Australia	26.30	$25,000
1994	Layne Beachley	Australia	20.67	Lisa Andersen	United States	13.16	$25,000
1993	Pauline Menczer (2)	Australia	19.7	Wendy Botha	Australia	16.3	$25,000
1992	Lisa Andersen (2)	United States	23.2	Neridah Falconer	Australia	22.6	$20,000
1991	Pauline Menczer	Australia	90.8	Michele Donoghoe	Australia	88.3	$20,000
1990	Lisa Andersen	United States	111.5	Kim Mearig	United States	98	$20,000
1989	Wendy Botha	Australia	120.8	Toni Sawyer	Australia	104.5	$15,000
1988	Kim Mearig (2)	United States	115.9	Freida Zamba	United States	113.5	$13,500
1987	Jodie Cooper	Australia	-	-		-	-
1986	Frieda Zamba (2)	United States	-	-		-	-
1985	Frieda Zamba	United States	-	-		-	-
1984	Kim Mearig	United States	-	-		-	-
1983	Helen Lambert	Australia	-	-		-	-
1982	Debbie Beacham	United States	-	-		-	-
1981	Linda Davoli	United States	-	-		-	-
1980	Margo Oberg (3)	United States	-	-		-	-
1979	Lynne Boyer	United States	-	-		-	-
1978	Margo Oberg (2)	United States	-	-		-	-
1977	Margo Oberg	United States	-	-		-	-
1976	Gail Couper (10)	Australia	-	-		-	-
1975	Gail Couper (9)	Australia	-	-		-	$200
1974	Gail Couper (8)	Australia	-	Judy Trim	Australia	-	-
1973	Not held	-	-	-		-	-
1972	Gail Couper (7)	Australia	-	-		-	-
1971	Gail Couper (6)	Australia	-	Judy Trim	Australia	-	-
1970	Gail Couper (5)	Australia	-	-		-	-
1969	Vivien Campbell	Australia	-	Phyllis O'Donnell	Australia	-	-
1968	Gail Couper (4)	Australia	-	Vivien Campbell	Australia	-	-
1967	Gail Couper (3)	Australia	-	-		-	-
1966	Gail Couper (2)	Australia	-	-		-	-
1965	Not held	-		-	-	-	-
1964	Gail Couper	Australia	-	-		-	-
1963	Not held	-	-	-		-	-
1962	Not held	-	-	-		-	-

== See also ==
- Quiksilver Pro Gold Coast
- Margaret River Pro

== Bibliography ==
- Mark Richards: A Surfing Legend, authorised biography by David Knox, 1992, ISBN 0-207-17489-X
- The Ol' Girl, Tracks magazine, March 2006 (listing men's winners 1973 to 2005)
- Kelly Slater Wins 2006 Rip Curl Pro, by Nick Carroll at Surfing Magazine.
