= Surfest =

Australian surfing competition

Surfest is an annual surfing competition held in Newcastle, New South Wales, Australia. Surfest began in 1985 as an initiative of Newcastle City Council, and at the time, was the world's richest surfing competition. The event runs for thirteen days, and from the 2007 event, has been held at Merewether Beach, having been held between Newcastle Beach and South Newcastle Beach in the past.

Surfest adopted a festival-style approach in 2015, with smaller, more official events held on surrounding beaches in the lead-up to the main event.

== Event champions ==
Year	Men's division	Women's division	Location
1985	(United States) Tom Curren	(South Africa) Wendy Botha	Newcastle Beach
1986	(Australia) Mark Occhilupo	(United States) Frieda Zamba	Newcastle Beach
1987	(Australia) Tom Carroll	(Australia) Jodie Cooper	Newcastle Beach
1988	(Australia) Damien Hardman	(Australia) Pam Burridge	Newcastle Beach
1989	(Australia) Tom Carroll	(Australia) Pauline Menzcer	Newcastle Beach
1990	(United States) Mike Parsons	(Australia) Michelle Donoghue	Newcastle Beach
1991	event not held		Newcastle Beach
1992	(Australia) Damien Hardman	(Australia) Vanessa Ousbourne	Newcastle Beach
1993	(Australia) Barton Lynch	(Australia) Pam Burridge	Newcastle Beach
1994	(Australia) Shane Powell	(Australia) Pam Burridge	Newcastle Beach
1995	(Australia) Michael Rommelse	(Australia) Neridah Falconer	Newcastle Beach
1996	(Brazil) Guilherme Herdy	(Australia) Neridah Falconer	Newcastle Beach
1997	(Australia) Shane Bevan	(Australia) Kylie Webb	Newcastle Beach
1998	(Australia) Mark Occhilupo	(Australia) Hayley Tasker	Newcastle Beach
1999	(United States) Taylor Knox	not held	Newcastle Beach
2000	(Australia) Mick Fanning	not held	Newcastle Beach
2001	(Australia) Mick Campbell	not held	Newcastle Beach
2002	(Australia) Mick Fanning	not held	Newcastle Beach
2003	(Australia) Dayyan Neve	(Australia) Rebecca Woods	Newcastle Beach
2004	(United States) Kelly Slater	(Australia) Rebecca Woods	Newcastle Beach
2005	(Australia) Mick Fanning	(Australia) Lynette McKenzie	Newcastle Beach
2006	(Brazil) Neco Padaratz	(Australia) Rebecca Woods	Newcastle Beach
2007	(Australia) Jay Thomson	(Brazil) Silvana Lima	Merewether Beach
2008	(Brazil) Adriano De Souza	(Australia) Stephanie Gilmore	Merewether Beach
2009	(South Africa) Travis Logie	(Australia) Phillipa Anderson	Merewether Beach
2010	(Republic of Ireland) Glenn Hall	(Australia) Kirby Wright	Merewether Beach
2011	(Australia) Dion Atkinson	(Hawaii) Coco Ho	Merewether Beach
2012	(Brazil) Willian Cardosa	(Australia) Sally Fitzgibbons	Merewether Beach
2013	(Australia) Joel Parkinson	(Australia) Dimity Stoyle	Merewether Beach
2014	(Australia) Matt Banting	(Hawaii) Malia Manuel	Merewether Beach
2015	(Brazil) Alejo Muniz	(Australia) Ellie Brooks	Merewether Beach
2016	(Australia) Matt Wilkinson	(Australia) Sally Fitzgibbons	Merewether Beach
2017	(Brazil) Yago Dora	(France) Johanne Defay	Merewether Beach
2018	(Australia) Mikey Wright	(Hawaii) Coco Ho	Merewether Beach
2019	(Brazil) Alex Ribeiro	(Australia) Sally Fitzgibbons	Merewether Beach
2020	(Australia) Julian Wilson	(Australia) Bronte Macaulay	Merewether Beach
2021	Cancelled due to COVID-19		
2022	(Australia) Jackson Baker	(Australia) Macy Callaghan	Merewether Beach
2023	(Australia) Joel Vaughan	(Australia) Bronte Macaulay	Merewether Beach
