= Piping Hot =

Australian surf and street clothing brand

Piping Hot Pty Ltd
- Industry: Retail
- Founded: 1975
- Founder: Fred Pyke; Rod Brooks
- Headquarters: Sydney, New South Wales, Australia
- Key people: Fred Pyke (Founder), Stan Wan (Managing Director)
- Products: Apparel, footwear, accessories and hard goods
- Parent: Futurity Brands Limited
- Website: pipinghotaustralia.com pipinghotfuture.com

Piping Hot is an Australian surf and street clothing brand. It was established in 1975 by Fred Pyke and Rod Brooks in Torquay, Victoria.

The brand has sponsored Australian surfers since 1975 including Simon Anderson, Pam Burridge, Barton Lynch, Tracey Browne, Sally Fitzgibbons and Wade Carmichael.

== Company ==
Piping Hot is an Australian surfwear brand, founded in 1975 in Torquay, Victoria, Australia by Fred Pyke. Today the brand operates under a licence model, and is predominantly sold through major discount department store, Target Australia. The company's headquarters are in Sydney, Australia.

== History ==
The company initially produced bespoke surfboards and wetsuits sold out of their small Torquay-based factory, under the name Dive and Surf, established in 1967. In 1975 the company introduced the brand Piping Hot, and began trading under that name.

In the late 1970s many surfers such as Larry Bertlemann, Nick Carroll, Nat Young, Joe Engel and Simon Anderson appeared in magazine ads and competed internationally, further promoting the brand.

In 1981 Piping Hot sponsored surfer Simon Anderson, who won the Bells Beach Surf Classic in the 30 ft category.

In the 1990s Piping Hot announced the sponsorship of surfing world titleholders Barton Lynch and Pauline Menczer.

On 24 March 2015 it was announced that Saban Brands Lifestyle Group had acquired Piping Hot.

In May 2019, Piping Hot was acquired by Futurity Brands Limited.

In September 2019 Piping Hot launched a limited T-shirt collaboration with Australian record producer and DJ Flume sold exclusively at his pop-up stores in Melbourne and Sydney.

In August 2020 Piping Hot launched Piping Hot Future in Japan and China retailing on Tmall and Zozotown.
