= Women's surfing in Australia =

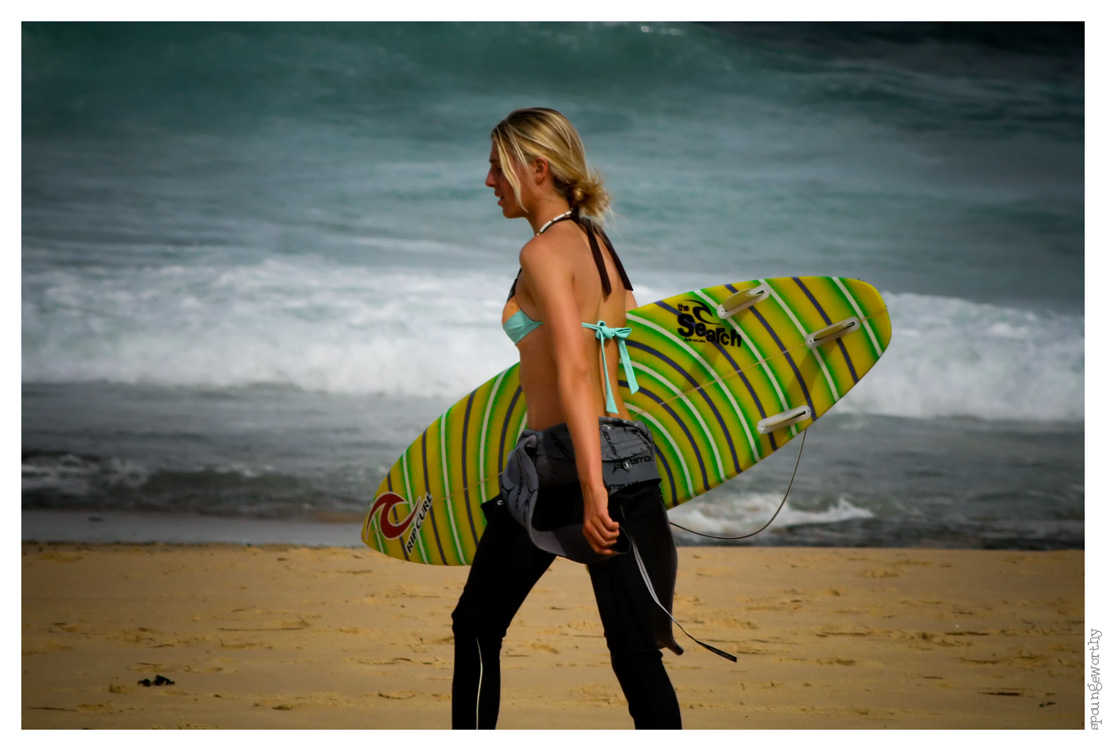
2007 Surfest started at Merewether Beach

In 1940, a study of 314 women in New Zealand and Australia was done. Most of the women in the study were middle class, conservative, Protestant and white. The study found that 183 participated in sport. The nineteenth most popular sport that these women participated in was surfing, with 2 having played the sport. The sport was tied with cricket, mountaineering, and rowing.

Isabel Letham was one of the early icons of women's surfing in Australia. She inspired several women including Pam Burridge.

During the 1970s, 1980s and 1990s, women's surfing saw a large expansion in the number of competitors. Since then one-third of Australia's Surfing population are female.

Women's competitive surfing did not develop as quickly as men. This is due to many female competitions being cancelled at short notice leading to irregular competitions. Women also earned considerably less than men. In the 1984 Beaurepaire Open, women competed for A$5,000, whilst men A$95,000.

Surf lifesaving in Australia banned women from rescue work and competition in 1914: "conquering the sea was a man's prerogative and women were deemed physically too weak to carry a heavy belt and line or to swim competitively in surf races" (Booth, 2007).

Australia has produced several women's world champions including Pam Burridge, Pauline Menczer and Wendy Botha.

Pam Burridge was one of the most influential women in Australian surfing to push for equality between the men's and women's parts of the sport. She competed in an era when men and women did not earn comparable prize money. She shocked many in the surfing community by chasing after and successfully surfing big waves, waves women were typically not known to surf.

== Notable Women in Australian Surfing ==
- Pam Burridge
- Pauline Menczer
- Wendy Botha

== Female Australian World Title Holders ==
- 1989: Wendy Botha
- 1990: Pam Burridge
- 1991: Wendy Botha
- 1992: Wendy Botha
- 1993: Pauline Menczer
- 1998: Layne Beachley
- 1999: Layne Beachley
- 2000: Layne Beachley
- 2001: Layne Beachley
- 2002: Layne Beachley
- 2003: Layne Beachley
- 2005: Chelsea Georgeson
- 2006: Layne Beachley
- 2007: Stephanie Gilmore
- 2008: Stephanie Gilmore
- 2009: Stephanie Gilmore
- 2010: Stephanie Gilmore
- 2012: Stephanie Gilmore
- 2014: Stephanie Gilmore

== Constraints for Women in Surfing ==
In 2012, a study was completed by Laura Fendt & Erica Wilson which looked at the motivations and constraints experienced by women in relation to surfing and surf-related travel. This study was conducted by facilitating in-depth interviews with 20 women surfers in New South Wales, Australia. The interview was structured around questions designed to provoke a more in-depth response from participants. On completion of the study the following table of results was constructed using the responses of the 20 interviewed women.

Category	Constraints	Number of References^{*}
Personal	Not knowing what to expect	12
Personal	Being in the minority as a female surfer	8
Personal	Staying healthy	7
Personal	Staying safe	4
Personal	Negotiating travel plans with family and partner	4
Personal	Experiencing self-doubts about surfing ability	2
Socio-Cultural	Encountering localism	6
Socio-Cultural	Differing attitudes between home and host country	5
Socio-Cultural	Trusting surf travel countries	2
Socio-Cultural	Finding compatible travel companions	2
Socio-Cultural	Battling the crowds	2
Practical	Managing Logistics	8
Practical	Facing Financial limitations	7
Practical	Finding the time	3

^* The numbers in this column do not equal 20 as each woman has stated several constraints

== Performance Differences Between Men and Women ==
Due to the natural differences in strength between men and women, competitions have always been segregated between the sexes. The main aspect of surfing which gives male athletes an advantage in competition is the pop up phase. The pop-up movement occurs when the surfer has gained enough speed in the paddling stage to catch the wave and is complete. Once this momentum has been gained an explosive movement occurs as the surfer pushes off the board to stand on their feet.

A study was conducted at the California State University (Note: While this study was conducted in America it still has significant relevance to surfers in Australia.) to measure the exact advantage that men had over women in this pop-up stage. Men and women of the same ages were asked to perform three pop-ups on a plate that would measure relative peak force, relative rate of force development, peak velocity, rate of velocity development and relative power. In all of these criteria, men produced significantly better results.

It was then concluded from these results that female surfers are not physically able to perform the pop-up action with forces equal to that of their male competitors.

== See also ==
- Surfing Australia
- Surfing in Australia
- Women's surfing

== Bibliography ==
- Stell, Marion K. (1991). Half the Race, A history of Australian women in sport. North Ryde, Australia: HarperCollins. ISBN 978-0-207-16971-7.
