= 2001 ASP World Tour =

Professional surfing league season

The ASP World Tour is a professional competitive surfing league. It is run by the Association of Surfing Professionals. The 2001 ASP Men's World Tour was restricted to five contests and the 2001 ASP Women's World Tour was restricted to three contests, due to the tragic events of September 11, 2001.

== Men's World Tour ==
=== Tournaments ===
Date	Location	Country	Event	Winner	Runner-up	Ref
April 10-April 22	Bells Beach	Australia	Rip Curl Pro	Mick Fanning (AUS)	Daniel Wills (AUS)	Report
May 8-May 19	Teahupoo, Tahiti	French Polynesia	Billabong Pro	Cory Lopez (USA)	C.J. Hobgood (USA)	Report
June 27-July 5	Rio de Janeiro	Brazil	Rio Surf International	Trent Munro (AUS)	Mark Occhilupo (AUS)	Report
July 17-July 27	Jeffreys Bay	South Africa	Billabong Pro	Jake Paterson (AUS)	Taylor Knox (USA)	Report
November 26-December 7	Sunset Beach, Hawaii	United States	Rip Curl Cup	Myles Padaca (HAW)	Michael Lowe (AUS)	Report

=== Final standings ===
Rank	Name	Country	Points
1	C.J. Hobgood	United States	3,094
2	Mark Occhilupo	Australia	2,816
3	Cory Lopez	United States	2,780
4	Taylor Knox	United States	2,744
5	Jake Paterson	Australia	2,688
5	Kalani Robb	Hawaii	2,688
7	Peterson Rosa	Brazil	2,566
8	Michael Lowe	Australia	2,520
9	Daniel Wills	Australia	2,512
10	Damien Hobgood	United States	2,436

== Women's World Tour ==
=== Tournaments ===
Date	Location	Country	Event	Winner	Runner-up	Ref
April 28-May 5	Tavarua	Fiji	Roxy Surf Jam	Megan Abubo (HAW)	Melanie Redman-Carr (AUS)	Report
May 8-May 19	Teahupoo, Tahiti	French Polynesia	Billabong Pro Tahiti	Layne Beachley (AUS)	Rochelle Ballard (HAW)	Report
November 25-December 7	Honolua Bay, Hawaii	United States	Billabong Pro	Neridah Falconer (AUS)	Pauline Menczer (AUS)	Report

=== Final standings ===
Rank	Name	Country	Points
1	Layne Beachley	Australia	1,760
2	Melanie Redman-Carr	Australia	1,730
3	Neridah Falconer	Australia	1,600
4	Rochelle Ballard	Hawaii	1,570
5	Serena Brooke	Australia	1,550
5	Keala Kennelly	Hawaii	1,550
5	Heather Clark	South Africa	1,550
8	Megan Abubo	Hawaii	1,450
9	Maria Tita Tavares	Brazil	1,390
10	Pauline Menczer	Australia	1,260
