= Billy Tennant =

Billy Tennant is a professional flowboarder from Durban, South Africa. He has won multiple tour titles and championships in South Africa. He competed on the US National Flow tour is 2007 and got a 2nd at the inaugural world championships in San Diego, CA. He was a member of the 2009/10 SA Team that travelled to Sentosa, Singapore for the IFC World Championships. Billy won the pro division of bodyboarding (prone) and was declared the (Prone) bodyboarding world champion on the flowbarrel and came 2nd overall in the IFC Rankings. The SA team won the IFC Team event and were the 2009 world champions. Billy is also the 2009/10 SA Flow Bodyboarding Champion 2008/2009. Billy won the 2011 World FLOW Championships in his home town of Durban, South Africa. He is the reigning 2011 World Champion.

Billy is sponsored by Thiel Board Company, Rip Curl clothing and wetsuits and Reef Brazil Footwear.
