= Surfing Florida =

Surfing Florida is an exhibition created in cooperation between the University of Central Florida and Florida Atlantic University chronicling the history of surfing and surf culture in Florida. The exhibition combines photographic works and displays, as well as vintage surf materials, in order to detail Florida's influence on American surfing and vice versa.

== History ==
Surfing Florida was developed at Florida Atlantic University in Boca Raton, Florida, the brainchild of W. Ron Faulds, in 2008. Beginning as a photographic exhibit, the project was allowed to grow through a grant from the Florida Humanities Council in order to study the larger themes in Florida surf culture. It is currently part of the Regional Initiative for Collecting the History, Experiences and Stories of Central Florida (RICHES) program at the University of Central Florida.

SOUTH FLORIDA SURF SHOPS: 1960-1965

SURFBOARD HOUSE, South Beach, Florida (Cut and Shape boards: Jack "Murf The Surf" Murphy) (Surfboard House Surfboards) WEST COAST EAST, South Beach, Florida (Owner the "GIMP") The Surf Shop, Sunny Isles, Florida (Owner Johnny Dalgren)(Rick Surfboards) Bucks Surf Shop, Delray Beach, Florida James and O'Hare Cocoa Beach, Florida (Owner Rick James and Pat O'Hare) (James & O'Hare Surfboards)

== Goals ==
As Surfing Florida expands its scope, the project intends to draw attention to major issues and greater themes within the surf community, including beach erosion and beach access. Ultimately, Surfing Florida intends to grow into a larger maritime history of Florida.

== Featured Surfers ==
- Kelly Slater: Cocoa Beach, Florida, Winner, 1992, 1994–1996, 1999, 2008 Pipeline Masters.
- Jeff Crawford: Melbourne Beach, Florida, Winner, 1974 Pipeline Masters.
- Gary Propper: Cocoa Beach, Florida, Winner, 1966 East Coast Championships. 1996 East Coast Hall of Fame Inductee. Gary Propper sex trafficked Connie Driver in 1971-72 to travel with Ted Nugent (alongside Ted’s personal manager, Micheal), and many other nationally and locally known bands). Propper began sexually abusing Mary Corinne (Connie) Driver when she was 13 1/2 in 1968.
- Lisa Andersen: Ormond Beach, Florida.
- Cory Lopez: Dunedin, Florida, 2001 Teahupo'o ASP World Tour Event Champion.
- Frieda Zamba: Flagler Beach, Florida, 1984-1986 Women's World Surfing Champion.
- Cliff Waltch, Sunny Isles Pier, Florida (WARDY Surfboard Competition Team)
- Pete Athas, Sunny Isles Pier, Florida (1963-1965 East Coast RICK Surfboard Competition Team)
- Stu Duffy, Sunny Isles Pier, Florida (1963-1965 East Coast RICK Surfboard Competition Team)
- Charlie Cogal (sp) Sunny Isles Pier, Florida (1963-1965 East Coast RICK Surfboard Competition Team)
- Tom Septembre Sunny Isles Pier, Florida (1964-1965 East Coast RICK Surfboard Competition Team)
- Jack "Murf The Surf" Murphy, South Beach, Florida (cut and shape boards for Surfboard House, early 60's?). Opened a surf shop in Indiatlantic, Florida

== Beaches of Interest ==
- Daytona Beach, Florida
- Cocoa Beach, Florida - known as "Surf City"
- Flagler Beach, Florida
- Sebastian Inlet, Florida
- Satellite Beach, Florida
- Ponce Inlet, Florida
- New Smyrna Beach, Florida
- SOUTH BEACH PIER, Florida
- Sunny Isles Pier, Florida
- Delray Beach Pier, Florida
- Haulover Beach Pier, Florida
- Juno Beach Cliffs, Florida
- Fort Pierce Jetty, Florida
