= Doug Warbrick =

Australian businessman

- Born: 30 December 1942 (age 83); Sunshine Coast, Queensland, Australia
- Other name: Claw
- Occupations: Entrepreneur, surfer
- Years active: 1960–present
- Known for: Co-founder of Rip Curl

Doug Warbrick (born 30 December 1942) is an Australian businessman, founder of the Rip Curl brand and notable figure in the sport of surfing. Warbrick is credited for bringing the longest running surf event in history, the Bells Beach Surf Classic, to the professional surfing circuit. He is a founding member of the ASP World Tour, surf aficionado and athlete mentor.

== Early life ==
Warbrick was born on the Sunshine Coast in Queensland, Australia. He began surfing as a child in Maroochydore. Warbrick's family then moved to Melbourne, Victoria, where Warbrick attended Brighton Grammar School.

== Career ==
In 1967, Warbrick opened a surf shop at Bells Beach. Two years later, in 1969, Warbrick founded Rip Curl with Brian Singer, shaping surfboards out of Singer's garage. Later, Rip Curl started producing wetsuits and moved into the famed 'Old Bakery'. Warbrick and Singer had discovered what Jack O'Neill had learned a few years earlier: cold-water surfers need wetsuits. In 1980, Rip Curl moved to its current headquarters on the Surf Coast Highway in Torquay, Victoria.

The name "Rip Curl" was taken from a vee-bottom surfboard that co-founder Warbrick bought in 1968, upon which he'd written "Rip Curl Hot Dog." The words didn't mean anything, he later admitted. "Except ripping was groovy; surfing the curl was groovy; we wanted to be groovy – so that was it."

— Matt Warshaw, Encyclopedia of Surfing

Warbrick was an original member of the Australian Surfing Association (now Surfing Australia) in 1963 and was a committee member and vice-president of Surfing Victoria in the 1960s and 1970s. He was also a founding member of the ASP World Tour and the Surfrider Foundation Australia. Warbrick was responsible for bringing the Bells Beach Surf Classic (now known as the Rip Curl Pro), held during Easter each year at Bells Beach, to the professional surfing circuit. Warbrick has mentored notable athletes such as Tom Curren, Michael Peterson and Mick Fanning.

== Awards ==
In 2008, Warbrick was inducted into the Brighton Grammar Hall of Fame.

In 2010, Warbrick was inducted into the Australian Surfing Hall of Fame.

In 2024, Warbrick was inducted into the International Surfing Museum Surfing Walk of Fame in Huntington Beach, California, along with Brian Singer, in the “Surf Culture” category.
