= Martin Potter =

Martin Potter may refer to:

- Martin Potter (actor) (born 1944), British actor
- Martin Potter (surfer) (born 1965), British/South African surfer
