= Damien Hardman =

Australian surfer (born 1966)

Damien Hardman (born 23 January 1966), known as The Iceman, is an Australian former surfer from Sydney. He won the Rip Curl Pro twice in 1988 and 1993, and was runner-up three times in 1989, 1991 and 1997, and in 1987/88 and 1991 he won the ASP World Tour. In 1999, he was inducted into the Australian Surfing Hall of Fame in 1999.

== Life and career ==
Hardman was born in Warriewood, New South Wales, on 23 January 1966. The son of financier Brian Hardman, who was later the ASP World Tour's media director, he was raised in the beachfront Sydney suburb of Narrabeen, home of well-respected and high performing surfers such as Simon Anderson and Col Smith.

Hardman placed third in the juniors division of the 1982 Australian National Titles, two years later he won the juniors in both the National Titles and World Championships. Hardman turned pro in 1984, and the following year completed his first full season on the world tour, finishing as number 17 and being named rookie of the year; in 1986 he ranked number 6. Hardman was only 21 when he won the 1987 World Title in a showdown with fellow Australian Gary Elkerton in the season's last contest at Sydney's Manly Beach.

Hardman was the tour's best competitor over the next six years, finishing 2nd in 1988, 4th in 1989 and 1990, 1st in 1991, 2nd in 1992, and 4th in 1993. He dropped to 13th in 1994 and nearly vanished from sight over the next two years. He came back in 1997, aged 31, finishing 6th. Hardman announced his retirement, then changed his mind, finishing the 1998 season rated 14th. He rose to 9th in 1999 and dropped to 25th in 2000. He finally announced his retirement in 2001 when he was described by Swell.com as "the ultimate professional surfer". He finished with a total of 19 Pro Tour wins, including the 1986 Stubbies Classic, the Rip Curl Pro in 1988 and 1993, and the Rip Curl Hossegor Pro in 1998. In 1988 he became the first male surfer to win seven events in one season (equaled later by world champions Tom Curren and Kelly Slater).

== Post surfing ==
Hardman was inducted into the Australian Surfing Hall of Fame in 1999. The following year he founded Instyle Enterprises, a surf accessories distribution company, and later owned a series of Rip Curl outlet stores, and what event director for the Rip Curl Pro Bells.

Achievements
Preceded by Tom Curren	Association of Surfing Professionals World Champion (men's); 1991	Succeeded by Kelly Slater
Preceded by Tom Curren	Association of Surfing Professionals World Champion (men's); 1987/88	Succeeded by Barton Lynch
