= Kelly Slater's Pro Surfer =

2002 video game

- Developers: Treyarch (Note: Ported to PC and Mac by Beenox.); HotGen (GBA)
- Publisher: Activision (Note: Published under the Activision O2 label.) (Note: Windows and Mac OS X version published by Aspyr.)
- Platforms: Game Boy Advance, GameCube, PlayStation 2, Xbox, Windows, Mac OS X
- Release: Game Boy Advance, GameCube, PlayStation 2, Xbox: NA: September 17, 2002; AU: October 14, 2002; EU: October 18, 2002; Windows, Mac OS X: WW: October 15, 2003
- Genre: Sports
- Modes: Single-player, multiplayer

Kelly Slater's Pro Surfer is a 2002 surfing video game developed by Treyarch and published by Activision under the Activision O2 label. The game was endorsed by veteran surfer Kelly Slater and released for Game Boy Advance, GameCube, PlayStation 2 and Xbox in 2002, and for Windows in 2003. To coincide with the game, Slater appeared as an unlockable character in the 2001 skateboarding video game Tony Hawk's Pro Skater 3, complete with surfboard. It received "favorable" reviews.

== Playable surfers ==
=== Included in base game ===
- Kelly Slater
- Lisa Andersen
- Tom Carroll
- Tom Curren
- Nathan Fletcher
- Donavon Frankenreiter
- Bruce Irons
- Rob Machado
- Kalani Robb

=== Unlockable via career mode and cheat code ===
- Tony Hawk
- Travis Pastrana
- "Tiki God"
- "Surfreak"

== Reception ==
Reception

Aggregate score
Aggregator	Score
Metacritic	(PC) 82/100 (Xbox) 80/100 (GC) 80/100 (PS2) 77/100 (GBA) 72/100

Review scores
Publication	Score
Electronic Gaming Monthly	6.5/10
Famitsu	27/40
Game Informer	(Xbox) 8.5/10 (PS2) 7/10
GamePro	4/5
GameSpot	8/10 (PC) 7.6/10
GameSpy	4.5/5 (GC) 4/5
GameZone	(PC) 8.9/10 (GC) 8.8/10 (Xbox) 8.6/10 (PS2) 8.5/10
IGN	8.9/10 (GC & GBA) 8/10
Nintendo Power	(GC) 3.8/5 (GBA) 3.3/5
Official U.S. PlayStation Magazine	3.5/5
Official Xbox Magazine (US)	6.9/10
PC Gamer (US)	78%
Entertainment Weekly	B

Kelly Slater's Pro Surfer received "generally favorable reviews" on all platforms except the Game Boy Advance version, which received "average" reviews, according to video game review aggregator Metacritic. Famitsu gave it a score of two sevens, one six, and one seven for a total of 27 out of 40. It was nominated for GameSpot's annual "Best Alternative Sports Game on Xbox" award, which went to Tony Hawk's Pro Skater 4. It was also nominated for "Outstanding Original Sports Game" by the National Academy of Video Game Trade Reviewers, but lost to Jet Set Radio Future.
