= Mark Occhilupo =

Australian surfer (born 1966)

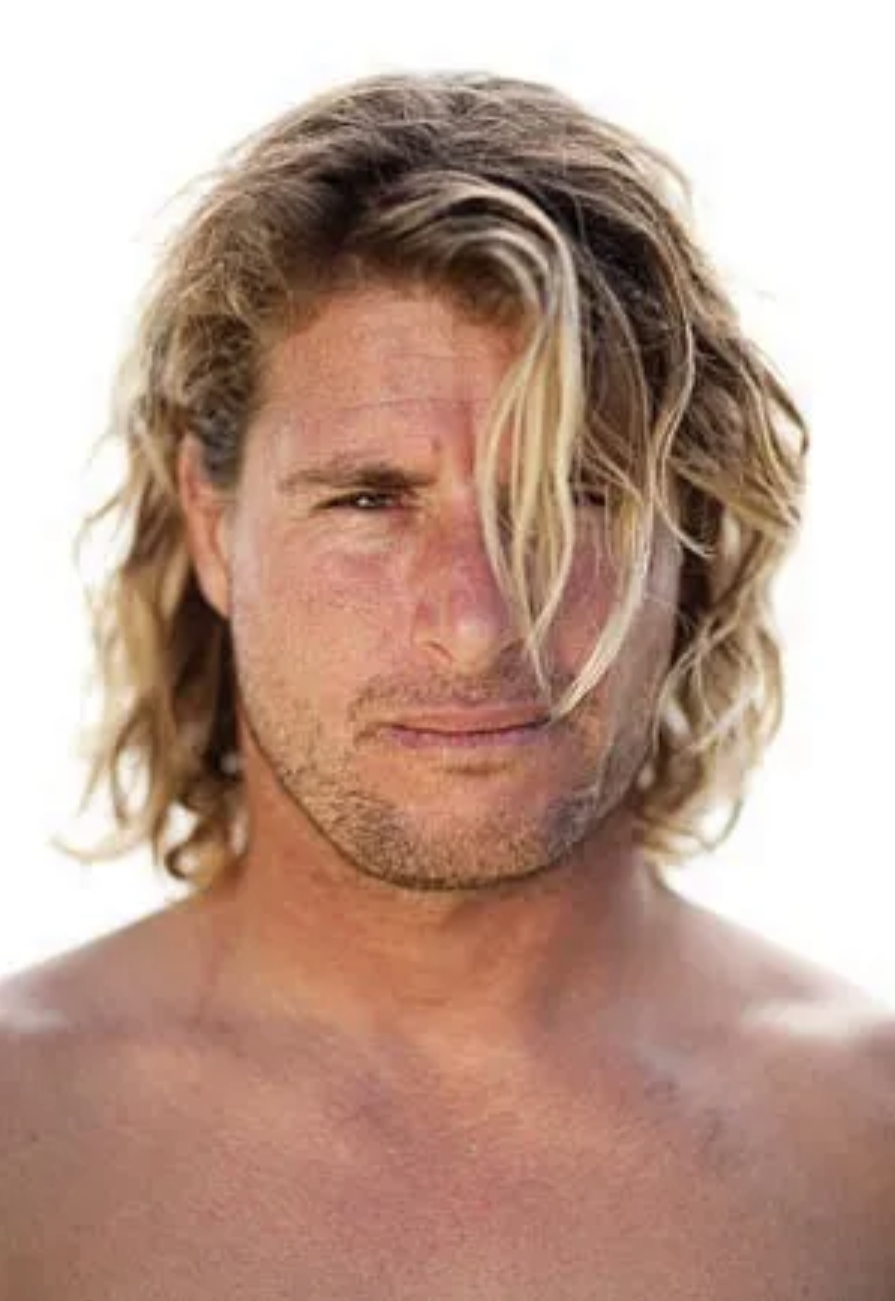
- Born: 16 June 1966 (age 60); Kurnell, Sydney, New South Wales, Australia
- Spouse: Jessica Crawford
- Children: 4 boys
- Surfing career
- Weight: 194 lb (88 kg)
- Website: markoccy.com
- Sport: Surfing
- Best year: 1999 ASP World Tour
- Career earnings: $652,125
- Sponsors: Billabong, FCS traction and fins, JS Industries surfboards, Globe (historical), Oakley (historical),
- Major achievements: World Surfing Champion 1999

Surfing specifications
- Stance: Goofy-footed
- Shapers: Jason Stevenson (current). Rodney Dahlberg (historical), Rusty Preisendorfer (historical),
- Favorite waves: Bells, Kirra, G-Land, J Bay

Marco Jay Luciano "Mark" Occhilupo (born 16 June 1966) is an Australian professional surfer and winner of the 1999 ASP World title.

Occhilupo, also known as "Occy", began his professional career in the World Championship Tour (WCT) at the age of 17. In September 2019, he made a brief return to the international surfing circuit and took part in the So Sri Lanka Pro 2019 tournament which also marked his first visit to the country.

== Life and career ==
Occhilupo was born on 16 June 1966 in Kurnell in Sydney, New South Wales, Australia. Occhilupo's father was Italian and his mother was originally from New Zealand. Marco began surfing at the age of nine, and soon moved to the neighbouring suburb of Cronulla, where he was previously enrolled into Cronulla High School in Sydney's south.

He won his first amateur schoolboys' contest at 13 and followed up with two Cadet State Titles. After the tenth grade, he left home as an ASP trialist. Virtually unnoticed, he advanced to the Top 16 at year's end and secured a seed for the following year.

In 1984, at age 17, Occhilupo's high performance standards took him to the top of the ASP ratings. At Jeffreys Bay, his powerful and aggressive style were an advantage in backside surfing. Occhilupo hovered around the top five in the rankings, and was becoming popular in the United States when Tom Curren was at the peak of his career. The two were rivals in surfing's biggest spectator event, the OP Pro, which Occhilupo won in 1985 after beating Curren in a three-heat final and again in the 1986 OP. Aspiring to be an actor, Occhilupo played himself in the 1987 Hollywood Cult-Classic, North Shore.

The young surfer struggled with depression and substance abuse during his years on the tour, and eventually, exhausted by his lifestyle, he threw a quarterfinal heat at the Op, headed home to Cronulla, and quit the World Tour.

Over the next several years, he made a couple of half-hearted comeback attempts and remained in the public eye as a repeating star of Jack McCoy's Billabong videos. He married Beatrice Ballardie in 1993 and built a house near Kirra. After reaching a weight of 111-kilos, he began a training program under McCoy in Western Australia that helped him shed 34 kilos and regained his form.

Occhilupo re-entered professional surfing in 1995, and re-established himself as a top competitor on his first full season back on the ASP World Tour in 1997, finishing the tour as runner-up to Kelly Slater. Occy's comeback was solidified at the Bells Beach Super Skins event that year. Although a non-rated event, his form earned him 11-straight heat victories and more prize money than the winner of the Bells Beach Pro WCT event that year. It is widely regarded as one of the greatest surfing performances of all time, with Mick Fanning declaring that Occy's performance would still garner perfect scores on the tour today. He carried this momentum into the following year at Bell's to claim the 1998 Rip Curl Pro - his first WCT event victory in 12 years and tied with Barton Lynch and Johnny Boy Gomes as the oldest WCT event winner at the age of 32.

After some further major wins he won the world title in 1999 at age 33. He has since retired and lives in Bilambil Heights, New South Wales, with his wife Beatrice and stepson Rainer. He made a comeback return for an international surfing event in 2019 after 20 years and competed in So Sri Lanka Pro 2019. However he recorded a modest score of 8.74 and was knocked out of Round 3 of the event.

== Career WCT victories ==
Occhilupo has won 12 WCT events, placing him 12th in all-time wins as of 2024.

ASP World Tour Wins
Year	Event	Venue	Country
1984	Country Feeling Classic	Jeffreys Bay, Eastern Cape	South Africa
1984	Tutti Fruitti Lacanau Pro	Gironde, Nouvelle-Aquitaine	France
1984	Beaurepairs Open	Cronulla, New South Wales	Australia
1985	Gunston 500	Durban, Natal	South Africa
1985	OP Pro	Huntington Beach, California	United States
1985	Swan Margaret River Thriller	Margaret River, Western Australia	Australia
1985	Pipeline Masters	Banzai Pipeline, Oahu	United States
1986	OP Pro	Huntington Beach, California	United States
1998	Rip Curl Pro	Bells Beach, Victoria	Australia
1999	Gotcha Tahiti Pro	Teahupoo, Tairapu, Tahiti	French Polynesia
1999	Quiksilver Pro Fiji	Namotu, Tavarua	Fiji
1999	Billabong Pro	Anglet/Mundaka	FranceSpain

== Post surfing ==
Occhilupo is currently a presenter on the Australian cable television channel Fuel TV.

He was a contestant in the 2011 season of the Australian version of Dancing with the Stars on Channel Seven, and was partnered with Jade Brand. They were the third couple to be eliminated from the competition.

His surname, Occhilupo, is Italian and means "eyes of the wolf." However, his nickname is "The Raging Bull."

He currently resides with his family in Bilambil Heights, a hillside suburb of the Gold Coast neighbouring town Tweed Heads.

He currently operates a successful podcast called the Occ-Cast which features Occhilupo talking to some of the most famous and interesting people in surfing, including Kelly Slater and Mick Fanning.

Achievements
Preceded by Kelly Slater	Association of Surfing Professionals World Champion (men's); 1999	Succeeded by Sunny Garcia
