= Women's cricket in Australia =

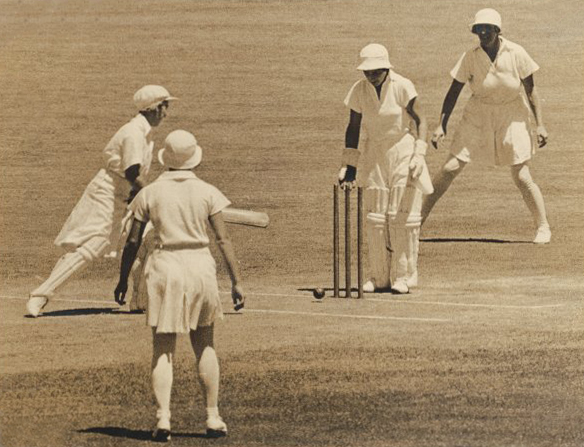
- Women's Test Cricket. Anne Palmer (VIC) bowled, with Spear, Snowball and Partridge (England), 2nd Women's Test match in Sydney 1935.
- Country: Australia
- Governing body: Cricket Australia
- National team: Australia

While not being urged to avoid competition, women had few opportunities to compete in sport in Australia until the 1880s. After that date, new sporting facilities were being built around the country and many new sport clubs were created.

== Early history ==
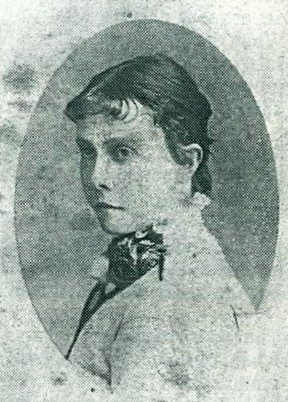
Photograph of Miss Lily Poulett-Harris, founding mother of women's cricket in Australia.

The founding mother of organised women's cricket in Australia was the young Tasmanian, Lily Poulett-Harris, who captained the Oyster Cove team in the league she created in 1894. Lily's obituary, from her death a few years later in 1897, states that her league was almost certainly the first to be formed in the colonies.

Prior to this, there had only been occasional one-off games such as a charity fundraiser which took place in Bendigo in 1874, (Note: Although 1874 is widely acknowledged, some sources state 1855 as the year of the first recorded match.) organised by Barbara Rae and a match organised by the Gregory sisters in Sydney in 1886.

During the 1890s, cricket and rowing were two of the most popular competitive sports for women in Australia. Another of the first all women's sport clubs founded in Australia was the Rockhampton Ladies' Club. They were fielding a women's cricket team in the mid-1890s. The team wore dresses with long skirts and long sleeves, sashes attached to their uniform, tight belts and straw boater hats.

== Early Twentieth Century ==
One location where cricket was being played was Bundaberg, where a ladies' town team had been established that was competing until as late as 1909. Cricket players, like other female athletes of this era, dressed in ankle length skirts, wore long sleeved blouses, and wore a hat and tie. The uniforms made it difficult to play as they did not allow a full range of movement. Another place where women played cricket on an all-women's team was in the Queensland town of Memerambi, southwest of Maryborough. In 1911, this team had several notable players including A. B. Postle, sister of the world champion sprinter at the time. By 1911, the skirts had changed to include fewer layers and allowed for greater movement of the legs. This improvement was offset by the need to wear wide-brimmed hats.

The Victorian Ladies' Cricket Association was founded in 1905 and disbanded in 1916 during the Great War. The Victorian Women's Cricket Association was formed in 1923. The Australian Women's Cricket Council was formed in 1931.

During the early part of the twentieth century, small towns in rural areas often lacked enough male players to have a full team. This problem was solved by allowing for mixed gendered teams. One town with a mixed gendered team was found in Croydon at the Croydon Villa Cricket Club. The lack of players was also a problem in the bush. Mixed gendered teams were created as part of informal games at locations such as the Cooroy Showgrounds. By the 1920s, women were playing cricket in outfits similar to men: Long white trousers, white sweaters and blouses. Batters had pads for their shins. The hats had smaller brims and were more fitted to their heads. This change in outfits allowed women a greater range of movement when they played the game. A female cricket team active during the 1920s was found in Toowoomba.

In 1922, a committee in Australia investigated the benefits of physical education for girls. They came up with several recommendations regarding what sports were and were not appropriate for girls to play based on the level of fitness required. It was determined that for some individual girls that for medical reasons, the girls should probably not be allowed to participate in tennis, netball, lacrosse, golf, hockey, and cricket. Soccer was completely medically inappropriate for girls to play. It was medically appropriate for all girls to be able to participate in, so long as they were not done in an overly competitive manner, swimming, rowing, cycling and horseback riding.

In 1933, the New South Wales Amateur Women's Sport Council was created by Gwendolen Game. The organisation brought together all the women's sporting bodies on the state level. Sports represented included New South Wales's women's field hockey, cricket, women's basketball, baseball, rowing and vigoro. A similar organisation covering similar sports had been created in Victoria in 1931.

In 1934, the Victorian Women's Centennial Sports Carnival was held. The event was organised by the Victorian Women's Amateur Sports Council and held at the Melbourne Cricket Grounds. The purpose was to increase women's interest in sport by providing them opportunities to play. Sports that were included on the programme included cricket, field hockey, women's basketball, bowls, rowing, swimming, athletics, rifle shooting, baseball, golf, tennis and badminton. There were over 1,000 bowlers involved over the course a week. Cricket featured a match versus a visiting English side. Women's basketball featured a Victorian side playing against a representative all Australian side. There was a day for watersports such as swimming and rowing. A tennis tournament was held. A field hockey tournament featuring Australian, Kiwi and Fijian teams was played.

In 1986, Lyn Larsen, at the age of 22, became the youngest captain ever of the Australian women's national cricket team. In 1988, the Australian women won the Cricket World Cup.

In 1940, a study of 314 women in New Zealand and Australia was done. Most of the women in the study were middle class, conservative, Protestant and white. The study found that 183 participated in sport. The nineteenth most popular sport that these women participated in was cricket, with 2 having played the sport. The sport was tied with cricket, mountaineering, rowing, and surfing.

Australian women's sports had an advantage over many other women's sport organisations around the world in the period after World War II. Women's sport organisations had largely remained intact and were holding competitions during the war period. This structure survived in the post war period. Women's sport were not hurt because of food rationing, petrol rationing, population disbursement, and other issues facing post-war Europe.

== Twenty-First Century ==
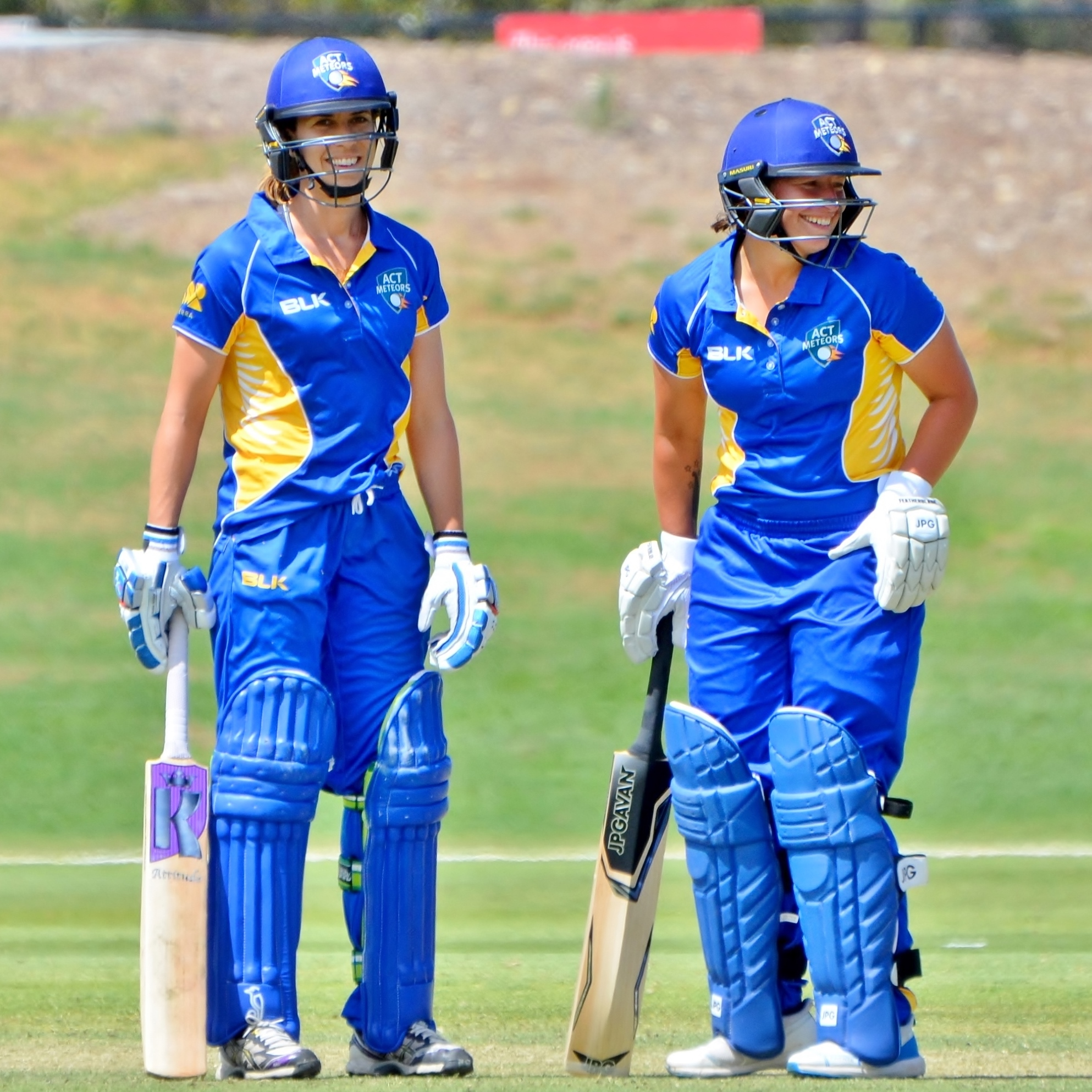
ACT Meteors players during a WNCL match in 2017

The current 50-over limited-over domestic tournament for Women in Australia is the Women's National Cricket League (WNCL). The competition has been held since the 1996–97 season. The league currently consists of seven teams: New South Wales Breakers, Queensland Fire, South Australian Scorpions, Tasmanian Roar, Victorian Spirit, Western Fury and ACT Meteors.

The 2013-2014 Australian National Cricket Census showed that female participation in the sport was up 39% to 247,000, with females making up 22% of total cricket participants in Australia.

A female Twenty20 league, the Women's Big Bash League (WBBL), has been aligned with the Mens Big Bash League (BBL) since the 2015–2016 season. The eight women's teams are: Perth Scorchers (WBBL), Hobart Hurricanes (WBBL), Brisbane Heat (WBBL), Adelaide Strikers (WBBL), Melbourne Stars (WBBL), Melbourne Renegades (WBBL), Sydney Sixers (WBBL) and Sydney Thunder (WBBL). Each team uses the same team name and colours as those of its male counterpart.

Important current day ambassadors for women's cricket in Australia include Ellyse Perry, Meg Lanning, Alex Blackwell and Alyssa Healy.

== The Ashes ==
The first ashes game, occurred in 1934. When the AWCC (Australian Women's Cricket Council) sent an invitation to the WCA (Women's Cricket Association), inviting England to tour in Australia. The tour consisted of 14, 3-day test matches, in Brisbane, Sydney and Melbourne. The first game being was played in Brisbane with a crowd of 1,500. England won the game by 9 wickets after a stunning performance from England's spinning allrounder Myrtle Maclagan who took 7 wickets for 10 runs.

== International Short-Form Competition ==
Not only do Australian women compete in cricket domestically, but also on the international stage. The Australian Women's Cricket Team (The Southern Stars) have competed at an international level in the short forms of the game since the first World Cup in 1973, in England. They won their first world cup in 1978 and then claiming the title on another five occasions in 1982, 1988, 1997, 2005 and 2013.

Since their first match in the 1973 World Cup the Southern Stars have played 254 ODIs (One Day Internationals), having 122 women represent Australia in the ODI team.

Another short form of the game that the Stars are competitive in is the Twenty20 competition. The Australian Women's Team have taken home the top trophy for the past three consecutive years at the Women's Twenty20 World Cup. Resulting from their efforts, the Southern Stars received a pay rise and became the highest paid women's sporting team in Australia.

== See also ==
- Cricket in Australia
- Australia national women's cricket team
- Lily Poulett-Harris - founder of women's cricket in Australia
- The Women's Ashes

== Bibliography ==
- Evening Post (19 December 1922). "Women in Print". Evening Post. Vol. CC, no. 147. New Zealand: National Library of New Zealand. p. 7.
- Bollen, Fiona (2020). Clearing Boundaries: The Rise of Australian Women's Cricket. Subiaco, WA: Churchill Press. ISBN 9780958598644.
- Butcher, Betty (1984). The Sport of Grace: Womens Cricket in Victoria, the Beginning. Melbourne: Sports Federation of Victoria. ISBN 978-0959384765.
- Butcher, Betty (1996). Ice-cream with Chilli Powder: A Manager's Account of a Women's Cricket Tour of India in the 1970s. Essendon, Vic.: B. Butcher. ISBN 978-0646275314.
- Cashman, Richard; Weaver, Amanda (1991). Wicket Women: Cricket & Women in Australia. Kensington, NSW: New South Wales University Press. ISBN 978-0868403649.
- Hawes, Joan L. (1987). Women's Test Cricket: The Golden Triangle 1934-84. Lewes, East Sussex: The Book Guild. ISBN 978-0863322747.
- Howell, Max; Howell, Reet; Brown, David W. (1989). The Sporting Image, A pictorial history of Queenslanders at play. Brisbane: University of Queensland Press. ISBN 978-0-7022-2206-1.
- Ironside, F. J. (Frederick James) (1878). Rules of Frisquette; Or, Ladies Cricket: An Enitrely New Out-door Australasian Game. Sydney: Gibbs, Shallard and Co. OCLC 757246485.
- Joy, Nancy (1950). Maiden Over: A Short History of Women's Cricket and A Diary of the 1948-49 Test Tour of Australia. London: Sporting Handbooks. OCLC 560082308.
- Morgan, Grace A. (2009). Morgan, John C. (ed.). Women's Cricket Touring in 1934/5 and 1948/9: An Autobiography. Holt, Wiltshire: GAM Book Publishing. ISBN 9780956193803.
- Papasergio, Clare; Moy, Janice (1990). The History of Women's Cricket in Western Australia. Perth, WA: C. Papasergio and J. Moy. ISBN 978-0646048215.
- Pollard, Marjorie (1937). Australian Women's Cricket Team in England, 1937: A Diary. Letchworth: Pollard Publications. OCLC 223800454.
- Stell, Marion K. (1991). Half the Race, A history of Australian women in sport. North Ryde, Australia: HarperCollins. ISBN 978-0-207-16971-7.
- Zedda-Sampson, Louise (2021). Bowl the Maidens Over: Our First Women Cricketers (Revised and expanded ed.). Seaford, Victoria: Lzs Press. ISBN 9780645125504.
