= Women's rowing in Australia =

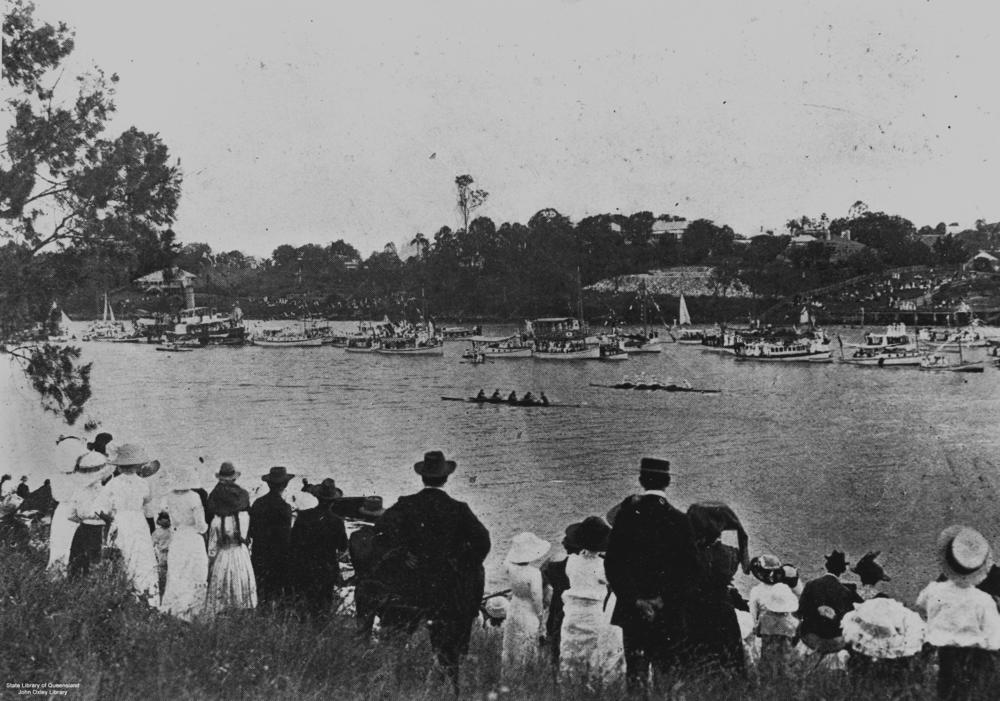
- Ladies rowing on the Brisbane River, ca. 1913 Spectators watching the floating procession of Henley-on-Brisbane, around 1913. The ladies four-oared Championships are being held in the river at the same time.
- Country: Australia
- National team: Australia

== History ==
While not being urged to avoid competition, women had few opportunities to compete in sport in Australia until the 1880s. After that date, new sporting facilities were being built around the country and many new sport clubs were created. During the 1890s, cricket and rowing two of the most popular competitive sports for women in Australia. A sculling race was held between two women from Victoria and New South Wales at the Albert Park Lake in Melbourne in 1901, during a regatta organised to celebrate a royal visit. The first recorded women's rowing club was the Albert Park Ladies' Rowing Club, formed in 1907 and based at Albert Park, with similar clubs formed in Brisbane in 1908 (the Brisbane LRC), Sydney in 1909 (the Western Suburbs LRC), and Tasmania in 1912 (the Buckingham LRC and the Sandy Bay LRC). During that time period, rowing was considered an acceptable sport for women to participate in, and was one of the first sports in which women were required to practise daily in order to excel at it. Interstate competition commenced in 1912, when the Brisbane club travelled to Melbourne to race the Albert Park crew. A return race was held the following year in Queensland, but no more interstate events were held until after the conclusion of World War I, when a Victorian crew lost to a South Australian crew in Adelaide. The Women's Four-Oared Championship of Australia was first contested in 1920, in conjunction with the men's King's Cup, and was won by South Australia, who were to win seven of the first eight tournaments.

In 1934, the Victorian Women's Centennial Sports Carnival was held. The event was organised by the Victorian Women's Amateur Sports Council and held at the Melbourne Cricket Grounds. The purpose was to increase women's interest in sport by providing them opportunities to play. Sports that were included on the programme included cricket, field hockey, women's basketball, bowls, rowing, swimming, athletics, rifle shooting, baseball, golf, tennis and badminton. There were over 1,000 bowlers involved over the course a week. Cricket featured a match versus a visiting English side. Women's basketball featured a Victorian side playing against a representative all Australian side. There was a day for watersports such as swimming and rowing. A tennis tournament was held. A field hockey tournament featuring Australian, Kiwi and Fijian teams was played.

== Governing and interstate competitions ==
The first national championship for women's rowing in Australia took place in 1920. The national championship was for four women boats, Also in 1920, the first national women's rowing sporting body was created. It was called the Australian Women's Rowing Council. The rules of rowing changed, and starting in 1934, the national championship also had a competition for eight women boats. In 1939, the national championships were canceled. This was being the men's only Victorian Rowing Council prevented the competition from happening by citing an obscure rule in their organisational rulebook that forbid men and women from rowing together on the same programme.

In 1933, the New South Wales Amateur Women's Sport Council was created by Gwendolen Game. The organisation brought together all the women's sporting bodies on the state level. Sports represented included New South Wales's women's field hockey, cricket, women's basketball, baseball, rowing and vigoro. A similar organisation covering similar sports had been created in Victoria in 1931.

== Schools ==
In 1922, a committee in Australia investigated the benefits of physical education for girls. They came up with several recommendations regarding what sports were and were not appropriate for girls to play based on the level of fitness required. It was determined that for some individual girls that for medical reasons, the girls should probably not be allowed to participate in tennis, netball, lacrosse, golf, hockey, and cricket. Soccer was completely medically inappropriate for girls to play. It was medically appropriate for all girls to be able to participate in, so long as they were not done in an overly competitive manner, swimming, rowing, cycling and horseback riding.

== Participation ==
In 1940, a study of 314 women in New Zealand and Australia was done. Most of the women in the study were middle class, conservative, Protestant and white. The study found that 183 participated in sport. The nineteenth most popular sport that these women participated in was rowing, with 2 having played the sport. The sport was tied with cricket, mountaineering, rowing, and surfing. In 1984, there were 1250 women who were a member of the Australian Rowing Council.

== International competitions ==
Women's rowing was included on the Olympic programme for the first time at the 1976 Summer Olympics. Because of internal conflicts, no Australian women competed in the event until the 1984 Summer Olympics. At that games, the four-person boat took home a bronze medal.

The first Australian female coxless pair to win a medal at a major international event outside the Olympics were Kate Slatter and Megan Still, who won a gold medal in 1995 in Finland at the World Championships.

== See also ==
- Netball in Australia
- Women's association football in Australia
- Women's field hockey in Australia
- Women's rowing

== Bibliography ==
- Blanch, John, ed. (1978). Ampol's Sporting Records (Revised Fifth ed.). Crows Nest, New South Wales, Australia: Jack Pollard Publishing Pty. Ltd. p. 284. ISBN 0-909950-22-9.
- Evening Post (19 December 1922). "Women in Print". Evening Post. Vol. CC, no. 147. New Zealand: National Library of New Zealand. p. 7.
- Howell, Max; Howell, Reet; Brown, David W. (1989). The Sporting Image, A pictorial history of Queenslanders at play. Brisbane: University of Queensland Press. ISBN 0-7022-2206-2.
- Stell, Marion K. (1991). Half the Race, A history of Australian women in sport. North Ryde, Australia: HarperCollins. ISBN 0-207-16971-3.
