= Rock climbing in Australia =

Rock climbing in Australia originated in Queensland, New South Wales and Tasmania in the early 1920s, and spread to the rest of Australia after WWII.

In 1998, it had a 0.3% participation rate for both genders. It has been featured in magazines like Vertical Life. Competition climbing is managed by Sport Climbing Australia. It has seen an increase in participation rate since inclusion of rock climbing in the Olympics.

== History ==
Like Europe and America, the climbing culture of Australia has its roots in alpinism and exploration. Early European exploration was focused in southeast of New South Wales in the Blue Mountains. There, the seemingly endless sandstone walls and the imagining of the landscape represented in the local newspapers helped to spread interest climbing peaks. Between 1927 and 1938 there were 150 articles, most of which are accompanied by photographs. It became traditional to set peaks on fire after reaching them, to signal success to the rest of the ascensionists' party on the ground.

Little is known about rock climbing in Aboriginal Australian culture, but today many mountains are sacred sites.

The difficulty of the climbs gradually increased, with some stylistic differences between Queensland and NSW climbers, with the former often climbing free solo and NSW climbers relying heavily on ropes. Some of the early bold ascents include Crater Bluff (9) by Eric Dark and Dorothy English in 1936, and Federation Peak (5) in 1949.

=== Post-WWII ===
Australian climbing began pushing into higher grades in the late 1950s with the first grade 17.

In the 1960s John Ewbank developed the Ewbank System for grading climbs, the world's first open ended system.

== See also ==
- History of rock climbing
- Women's rock climbing in Australia
- Sport Climbing Australia
