= Sport Climbing Australia =

Governing body for competition climbing

- Sport: Competition climbing
- Jurisdiction: Australia
- Abbreviation: SCA
- Founded: 1963
- Affiliation: World Climbing

Official website
- www.sportclimbingaustralia.org.au
- (Australia)

Sport Climbing Australia is the governing body for competition climbing, including competition lead climbing, competition speed climbing, and competition bouldering in Australia.

== History ==
The body was founded in 2004 as an amalgamation of the Australian Sport Climbing Federation and the Australian Climbing Gyms Association. Both bodies had previously designated themselves as the National Sport Organisation for sport climbing in Australia, without any official recognition. As the Australian Sports Commission requires sports to have a single governing body to be officially recognised, the two bodies put their differences aside in the greater interests of the sport.

== Structure ==
The national body has currently four state member associations: Sport Climbing Victoria, Sport Climbing Queensland, Sport Climbing Tasmania and Sport Climbing NSW/ACT. Competition Sport Climbing South Australia and Sport Climbing Western Australia are pending membership.

== See also ==
- Rock climbing in Australia
- Women's rock climbing in Australia
