= Rusty Australia =

Surf Brand

Rusty
- Founded: 1985; 41 years ago in San Diego
- Founder: Rusty Preisendorfer
- Headquarters: Perth, Western Australia, Australia
- Products: Surfing equipment and surfwear
- Owner: Vegas Enterprises Pty Ltd.
- Website: rusty.com.au

Rusty is an Australian surfboard and surfwear brand formed in 1985 by Rusty Preisendorfer. It also operates in the US under the name Rusty Surfboards.

Notably, Rusty has worked with professional surfers such as Josh Kerr, Jamie O'Brien, C. J. Hobgood, Wade Carmichael, Liam "Letty" Mortensen, Jacob "Zeke" Szekely and Rob Bain.

== History ==
Rusty began as Rusty Surfboards, a San Diego–based surfboard company founded by surfboard maker Rusty Preisendorfer in 1985. Before starting Rusty Surfboards, Preisendorfer had worked for Canyon Surfboards in San Diego. In 1985, Preisendorfer also collaborated with local surfboard maker Mick Button on a series of surfboards.

Professional surfer C.J. Hobgood became world champion in 2001, becoming the first athlete sponsored by Rusty Surfboards to become world champion. Rusty Australia was then renamed to just Rusty in 2006.

In 2014, Rusty and Billabong teamed up to make a line of surfboards that are replicas of the board used by Mark "Occy" Occhilupo in 1984.

Rusty released the surf film TUFF (2015), which starred Noa Deane, Josh Kerr, and Dylan Goodale.

Surfer magazine released features on Rusty Surfboards' Chupacabra, SD, and Blackbird surfboard models in 2018, featuring designer Clint Presidendorfer.

In 2020, the Rusty Boardhouse surf shop in La Jolla, California, closed down. During the 2020 Australian bushfire season, Rusty also made a bushfire relief T-shirt design whose proceeds went to the Australian Red Cross and WIRES Wildlife Rescue's relief efforts.

== Surfboards and clothing ==
Rusty has released a variety of surfboard types such as fish, shortboard, longboard, and hybrid surfboards. Its surfboard models include the Rusty Keg, the Rusty Blade, and the Dwart.

Rusty also makes clothing such as shirts, boardshorts, sandals, and swimwear. Rusty also introduced shark deterrent patterns to its surfboards in 2017.

== See also ==
- Billabong (clothing)
