= Women's rock climbing in Australia =

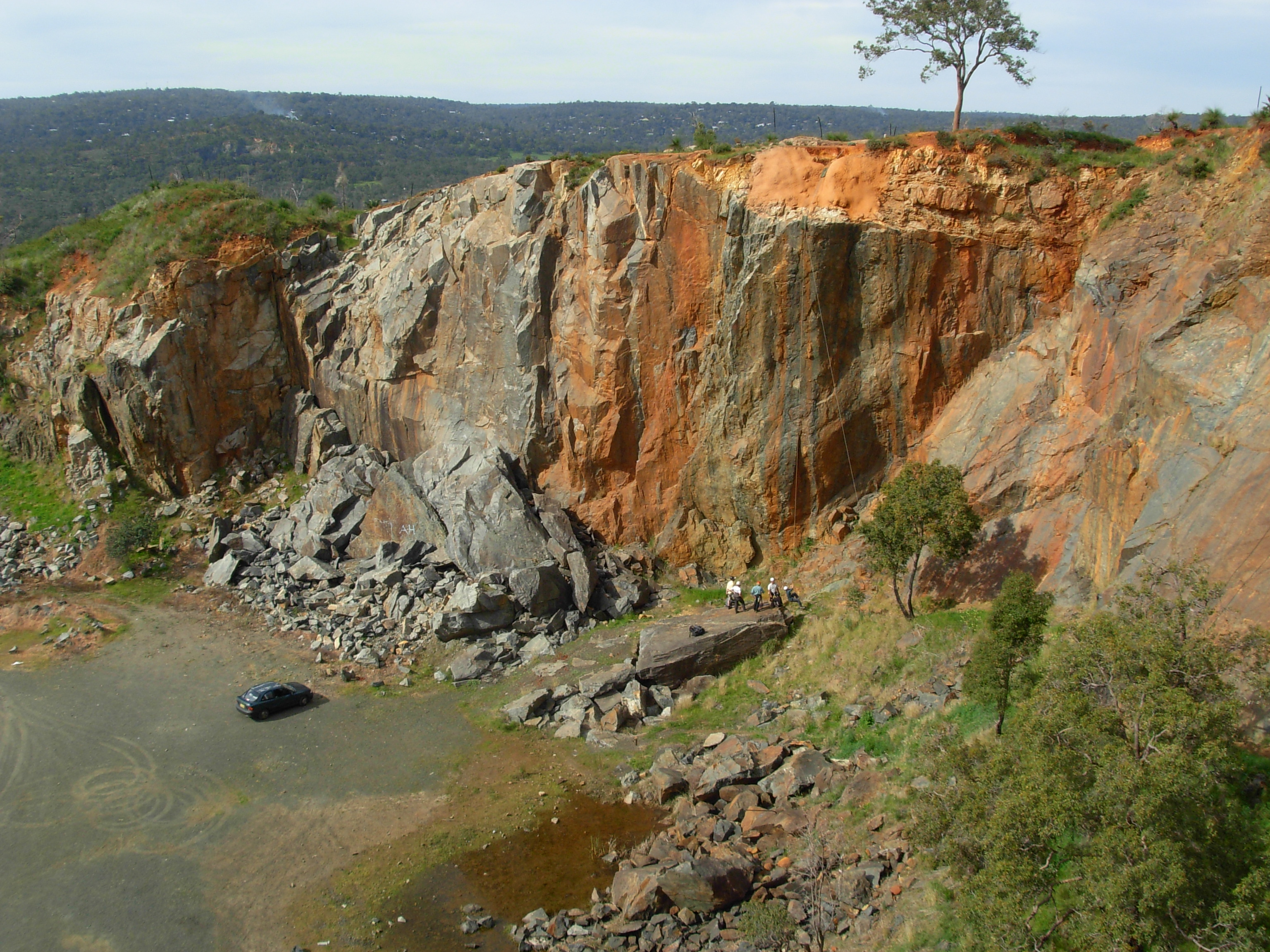
- Photo is taken from the southern wall of the Statham's Quarry, Gooseberry Hill, Western Australia looking north. The foreground is the base of the quarry, and the rockwall facing the view is the medium difficulty abseiling location. There are climbers at the base.
- Country: Australia
- National team: Australia

Rock climbing in Australia, a sport characterized by its physical demands and mental challenges, has seen significant female participation and evolution. Historically emerging as a mixed-gender activity in the early 20th century, women initially participated under challenging conditions, wearing restrictive attire similar to other sports of the era such as golf and cricket. Over time, the presence and impact of women in Australian rock climbing have grown substantially.

== History ==
Women's rock climbing started out as a socially oriented mixed gender sport in Australia at the start of the twentieth century. Women wore the same restrictive costumes that they wore in other sports of the era like golf and cricket.

By 1954, women were members of the Sydney Rock Climbing Club and were participating in club events alongside their male counterparts.

== Participation ==
In 1940, a study of 314 women in New Zealand and Australia was done. Most of the women in the study were middle class, conservative, Protestant and white. The study found that 183 participated in sport. The nineteenth most popular sport that these women participated in was mountaineering/hill climbing, with 2 having played the sport. The sport was tied with cricket, mountaineering, rowing, and surfing.

Women were climbing at Katoomba in New South Wales by 1934.

== Media ==
Women's rock climbing was being reported in Australian newspaper in 1930. The media described the women who participated in the sport as "intrepid."

== See also ==
- Rock climbing in Australia
- Sport Climbing Australia

== Bibliography ==
- Howell, Max; Howell, Reet; Brown, David W. (1989). The Sporting Image, A pictorial history of Queenslanders at play. Brisbane: University of Queensland Press. ISBN 0-7022-2206-2.
- Stell, Marion K. (1991). Half the Race, A history of Australian women in sport. North Ryde, Australia: HarperCollins. ISBN 0-207-16971-3.
