= Flowboard =

Variation on a skateboard

A flowboard is a variation on a skateboard, combining aspects of surfing, skating and snowboarding. There are three sizes made by the brand Flowboards: 32", for tricks and smaller riders; 36", the standard size; and 42", the large downhill bomber.

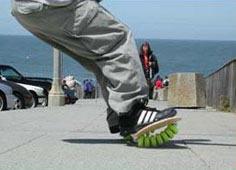
14-wheel Flowboard

== Concept ==
The flowboard was created by Pieter Schouten and Mike Simonian, two design students attending the Art Center College of Design in Vevey, Switzerland. In 1993, they had the idea to develop a board that would perform like a snowboard, but on asphalt. They found that on a skateboard, a rider could only lean over a few degrees and then the bushings would give resistance in a turn. The two inventors sought a solution that would give a rider the ability to execute more extreme angles while carving without resistance, offering fluid transitions edge to edge. In 1994, Simonian asked Schouten to spend time developing their ideas in Simonian's native California.

Schouten came up with a concept for a two-wheeled board with two curved axles with one wheel on each and springs on either side. The theory was that wheels would slide along the arced axles as the board leaned to carve. These "arced axles" became one of the key elements of the new board design. To allow the board to turn, the two men found that by mounting the axles at opposing angles, the wheels would go in a straight line when they were at the top of the arc and that when the wheels slid to either end of the arc they would have a curved relationship that would result in a turn. The "angled axles" would be the second key element of the new board design. The first prototype was produced in Simonian's parents' garage on El Arco Drive in Whittier, California. This location became the namesake of the "El Arco Axles".

== Company ==
Numerous potential investors were approached including Powell Skateboards, Morey Boogie Board, pro-skater Rodney Mullen, Nike, Rollerblade and Mattel, but nothing developed from the discussions. In 1999, the two inventors formed Flowlab LLC alongside entrepreneur Phil Wessells. By the year 2000, the very first Flowboards were being shipped.

In 2003, Michael Kern (CEO of Sport Technology Inc.), then the company's largest distributor, purchased the company and a new headquarters in Long Beach, California was established. In 2005, Flowlab signed an exclusive distribution agreement with the skate wheel manufacturer Kryptonics to further expand its presence in general sporting goods channels.

In 2007, Michael Kern took his Company Public with FBC Holding Co.. A division of Capital One Inc., and was shut down unlawfully and has been seeking action against FBC Holding Inc. and Capital One Inc. to the current date.

== Handling ==
The flowboard's design enables a 45 degree turning ability rather than the standard 25 degrees on a skateboard while still remaining stable.

A flowboard tends to put pressure on just 2 wheels of the board, rather than 4. This more focused weight distribution requires slightly more effort into keeping the board moving. For this reason, it is often ideal to ride it on downhill slopes. Spacers can also be installed to reduce bearing compression caused by the trucks' arched structure and improve mobility.
