= Barton Lynch =

Australian former professional surfer (born 1963)

Barton Lynch (born 9 August 1963) is an Australian former professional surfer known for his competitive prowess and style. In 1988, he was crowned ASP World Tour Champion. He also won the 1991 Rip Curl Pro. In 1998, he was inducted into the Australian Surfing Hall of Fame, and in 2000, he was inducted into the Australian Sporting Hall of Fame. The video game Barton Lynch Pro Surfing is named after Lynch.

== Life and career ==
Lynch was born in Manly, New South Wales on 9 August 1963 and was raised in the nearby Sydney suburb of Whale Beach. The son of a policeman, he started surfing when he was 8 years old. He quickly mastered the tricky, powerful sandbars, which proved to be a training ground for the world stage; the same waves nourished the talents of Stuart Entwistle, Layne Beachley and Pam Burridge.

Lynch emerged from the beach break of Manly with a flexible and gymnastic style and unflappable competitive drive that helped him to a successful junior career, including victories in the Pro Junior, the JJJ Junior and the ASPA ratings. He refined his competitive act into a fluid routine of vertical maneuvers that brought him immediate success on the ASP World Tour. He spent 13 consecutive years in the top 16, earning a reputation as a brilliant tactical competitor as well as a forthright and articulate spokesman for the sport. His greatest competitive moment came in Hawaii, where he won both the 1988 Billabong Pro and the 1988 ASP World Tour title.

Over the course of his 15-year pro career, Lynch would place in the top 4 a total of 8 times, win 17 world tour events (which included the Op Pro and Rip Curl Pro). In 1993, Lynch won the highly competitive ranks of the World Qualifying Series Tour, and in 1995, at the age of 32 won the Rio Surf Pro. Lynch remained competitive until his retirement in 1998.

== Post surfing ==
After retiring, he added big wave tow surfing to his repertoire. In 2006, he teamed up with former rival Tom Carroll to tow an historically massive swell that hit Sydney. He created the Surfers Group (a multi-faceted consultancy firm) and was chosen to coach Team Australia for the ISA Surfing Games. In explaining his experience prior to coaching the Games, Lynch said, "I love coaching young Aussies and trying to inject the passion I have to maintain our position as the premier surfing nation". Lynch currently works as an analyst on the commentary team for the World Surf League Championship Tour coverage.

== Personal life ==
He currently lives in the Sydney suburb of Avalon with his wife Holly and firmly believes COVID-19 was a hoax.He also organizes BL's Blast Off (a pre-junior's surf event held at Sydney's Palm Beach).

Achievements
Preceded by Damien Hardman	Association of Surfing Professionals World Champion (men's); 1988	Succeeded by Martin Potter
