= Megan Abubo =

American surfer

Personal information
- Born: January 28, 1978 (age 48) U.S.
- Years active: 1998–present
- Height: 5 ft 9 in (175 cm)
- Weight: 135 lb (61 kg)
- Website: meganabubo.com

Surfing career
- Sport: Surfing
- Sponsors: Surftech Quiksilver (Roxy), GO211
- Major achievements: (2001) World Champion runner-up title, (2001) 1st WCT Roxy Pro Fiji, (2002) 1st WCT Figueira Pro in Portugal, (2004) 1st WCT Rip Curl

Surfing specifications
- Stance: Regular (natural) foot
- Shaper: Eric Arakawa
- Quiver: 5'5", 5'10", 6'1", 6'4", 6'6"
- Favorite waves: Pipeline (North Shore, Oahu), Waimea Bay (North Shore, Oahu), Sunset Beach (North Shore, Oahu), Cloud Break (Fiji)

Megan Abubo (born January 28, 1978) is a professional surfer from Hawaii.

== Biography ==
Born in Connecticut and raised in Hawaii, Megan Abubo showcases a style honed on powerful reef-breaks and deepwater ocean waves.

Growing up in Hawaii, Megan quickly became one of the "beach boys" and worked her way to a spot on the World Championship Tour ranks in 1998. She has been on the WCT ever since and in 2000 she was runner up for the world title. She has had many victories both in and out of the water. In October 2004 Megan won the WCT Rip Curl Malibu Pro and shot from 14th to 9th in the ratings. In 2002, she won the WCT Figueira Pro in Portugal, and in 2001 she won the WCT Roxy Pro in Fiji. Throughout her career she has had 5 other WCT victories.

Megan joined a handful of the best women surfers in the world on the first all-female boat trip with Transworld Surf to Indonesia in 2004.

== Activism ==
Today her work includes being spokesperson on behalf of Roxy for Keep A Breast – an art initiative that raises money for breast cancer research by auctioning art-decorated breast casts of famous female athletes and artists. Megan has developed a passion for breast cancer awareness since her sister, a 2-time breast cancer survivor, was first diagnosed at age 27. Her sister has since died. Megan headed up a Keep A Breast fundraiser in Hawaii of 2004 at the Roxy Pro.

== Professional surfing ==
Megan has 6 Association of Surfing Professionals (ASP) World Championship Tour victories to her credit, the 2001 World Champion runner-up title and a no. 4 finish in 2005.

In December 2007, Abubo won the Vans Triple Crown of Surfing in Hawaii, despite a rib injury.

== Media appearances ==
Megan has appeared as herself and as a stunt double in the motion picture Blue Crush as well as several action sports TV shows and surf videos, such as 7 Girls, Roxy Surf Now, and Shimmer. She has also appeared in magazines including Rolling Stone, Fitness and surf publications.

== Articles ==
- "Hawaiian Megan Abubo Wins Inaugural Rip Curl Malibu Pro World Championship Surfing Contest" Surf Magazine
- "Girl On: Megan Abubo – Girl in the Curl" Lat34.com
