= Jodie Cooper =

Australian surfer

Personal information
- Born: 4 May 1964 (age 60); Albany, Western Australia

Jodie Cooper (born 4 May 1964 in Albany, Western Australia) is a former champion surfer. She won 13 international surfing events, including titles in Australia, Japan, Hawaii and mainland United States and was runner-up on a further 13 occasions between 1983 and 2002. Despite her event successes, she never won the world women's title however.

Cooper started as an amateur in 1981 and in 1983 turned professional with a second place at the Bells Beach Surf Classic in Victoria. By the end of the following year she was ranked number four in the world. She had her first professional win at Huntington Beach in California at the start of 1985 and later in the year won the World Cup in Hawaii. With a number of second and third placings she ended the year with a number two world ranking.

She quit the world tour in 1994 and after suffering a back injury, retired in 2002, having earned US$148,685 in career prize money which placed her 11th on the All Time money list at that time.

The Jodie Cooper Award (first awarded in 1999) is made to the Western Australian Female Surfer of the Year. She was made a Life Member of the Association of Surfing Professionals in 1994 and in 2001 was inducted into the Western Australian Hall of Champions.

She came out as lesbian, becoming the first openly-gay World Tour surfer.
