= Simon Anderson =

Australian surfer (born 1954)

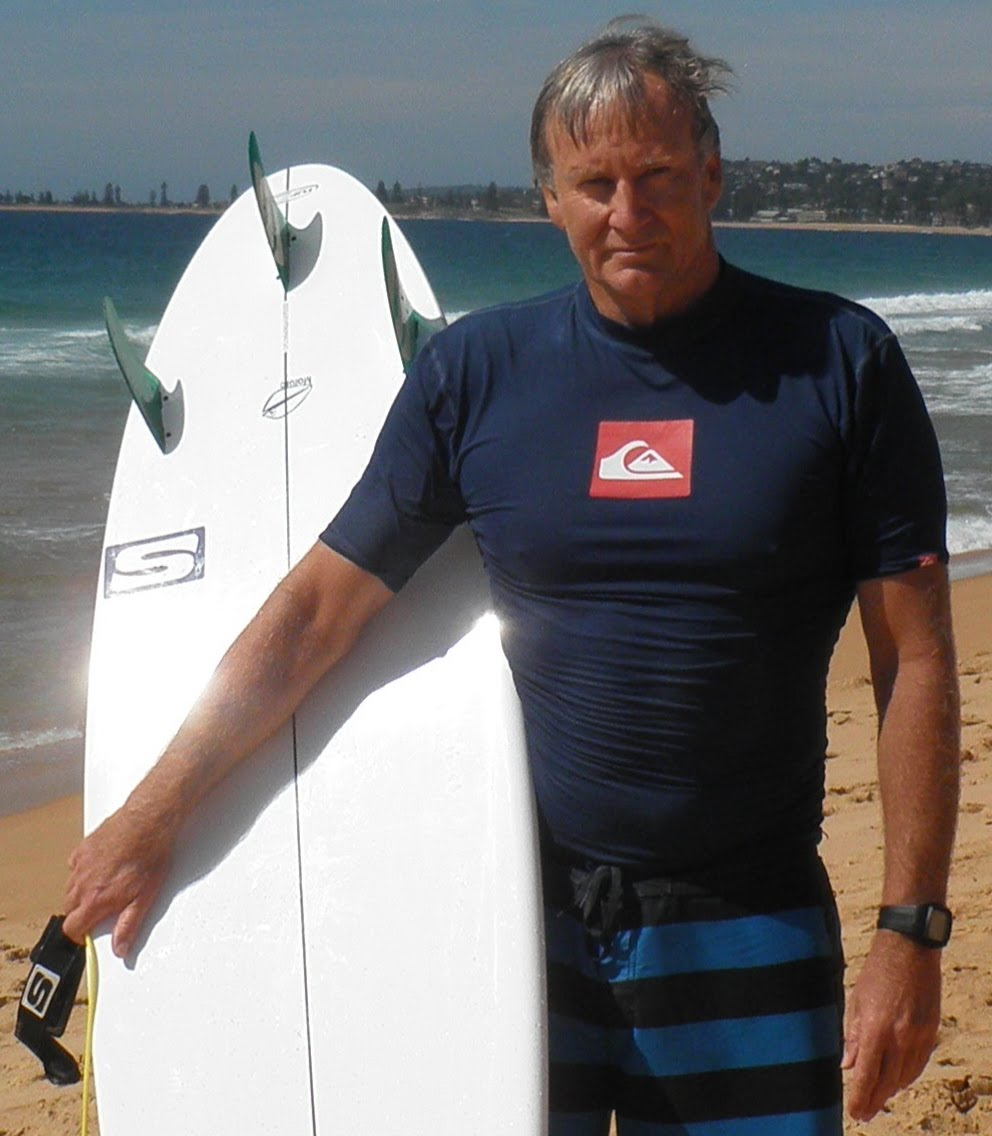
- Born: 7 July 1954 (age 71)
- Occupations: Surfer; Surfboard shaper
- Known for: Professional surfer and inventor of the three fin surfboard
- Surfing career
- Height: 6 ft 3 in (191 cm)
- Weight: 229 lb (104 kg)
- Sport: Surfing

Surfing specifications
- Stance: Regular (natural foot)

Simon Anderson (born 7 July 1954) is an Australian competitive surfer, surfboard shaper, and writer. He is credited with the 1980 invention of a three-fin surfboard design, called the "thruster".

== Early life ==
Anderson grew up in the Northern Beaches area of Sydney with three brothers. His family lived in a house that overlooked Collaroy Beach. In 1977, he won the junior division at the Bells Beach Classic Easter competition and began shaping surfboards in the Sydney suburb of Brookvale.

== Career ==
In 1977 he won the Bells Beach Classic competition and the Coke Surfabout in Sydney.

In October 1980, after seeing a twin fin surfboard with a "trigger point" fin Anderson had the idea for a new version of the existing three fin design which was later dubbed the "thruster". Anderson created a prototype for the "thruster" design and took it on tour with him to Hawaii and California. When he returned to Sydney, he made two more surfboards with similar designs.

In 1981, using one of those surfboards, he won the competition at the Bells Beach Classic and the World Surf League Offshore Pipeline Masters. "Surfing history took its biggest turn since polyurethane foam" as the "thruster" design became the most popular fin design for surfboards over the next 30 years.

Anderson retired from professional surfboarding in the mid-1980s and never sought to benefit commercially by patenting his invention. Anderson said: "If I didn’t come up with it right then, there were a lot of other people at the time that were working toward that same end goal. I’m just fortunate, and happy to contribute."

In November 2000, Anderson was awarded the Australian Sports Medal for services to surfboard design. In August 2010 Anderson was honored by US Blanks at the Sacred Craft Expo in San Diego California. In 2011, Anderson published his autobiography called Thrust: The Simon Anderson Story and was inducted into the Surfer's Hall of Fame.

For some time, Anderson was a surfboard shaper at BASE, a Gold Coast surfboard-manufacturer that closed in 2011.

Anderson has support many team riders including Kerby Brown and Cooper Chapman.

== Personal life ==
Anderson lives with his wife and two sons in Newport Beach, Sydney.
