= Wendy Botha =

South African-Australian surfer

Wendy Botha (born 22 August 1965) is a four-time world surfing champion. She won her first title as a South African citizen in 1987, then she became an Australian citizen and won three more titles in 1989, 1991, and 1992. She also posed nude for Australian Playboy for the September issue of 1992. Botha married New Zealand rugby league international and television star Brent Todd in 1993. They had two children, Jessica and Ethan, and split in about 2005.

Botha was inducted into the Surfing Walk of Fame in Huntington Beach, California in 2009 as that year's Woman of the Year. In October 2018, she was inducted into the Sport Australia Hall of Fame.

Preceded by Frieda Zamba	World surfing champion (Women); 1987	Succeeded by Frieda Zamba
Preceded by Frieda Zamba	World surfing champion (Women); 1989	Succeeded by Pam Burridge
Preceded by Pam Burridge	World surfing champion (Women); 1991–1992	Succeeded by Pauline Menczer
