= Nick Carroll =

Nick Carroll (born 1959 in Brisbane, Queensland) is an Australian surf journalist, former competitive surfer, author, and editor. He is the older brother of two-time world surfing champion Tom Carroll.

== Early life and surfing career ==
Nick Carroll was born in Brisbane in 1959 and relocated with his family to Newport, New South Wales, in 1961. He began surfing at the age of 11.

He emerged as a standout competitive surfer, winning the men's division of the Australian National Surfing Titles twice—in 1979 and again in 1981—and finishing as runner-up in 1977.

He was also a founding member of the Newport Plus Surf Club—a powerful force in Australian surfing during the early 1980s.

== Journalism and editorial career ==
Following his surfing career, Carroll turned his talents to journalism, beginning with Tracks magazine. He served as editor of Tracks from 1984 to 1986.

His editorial career continued internationally when he worked in the United States as editor-in-chief for Western Empire Publications—the publisher of Surfing Magazine.

He later edited Deep magazine from 1997 to 2000.

Carroll served as Surfline’s Australian editor—a role he assumed after Surfline acquired Coastalwatch in 2019.

Carroll has written for publications including Financial Review, The Australian, and “Real Surf”, and hosted an "Ask Nick Carroll" feature offering surf advice.

== Books and media projects ==
Carroll is the author of TC, the biography of his brother, two-time world surfing champion Tom Carroll. TC won the Surf Culture Award in the 2014 Australian Surfing Awards for "a project that captures and explores a quintessential element of Australian surfing culture".

He has also contributed to television media, co-writing the ABC's documentaries Bombora and Wide Open Road. Through Bombora, Carroll suggested that "surfing is the ultimate expression of Australiana".

Beyond surf media, Carroll authored Out the Back with Bondi Rescue: True Stories Behind the Hit TV Show, offering behind-the-scenes perspectives on Bondi lifeguards.

== Recognition and style ==
Nick Carroll has long been regarded as one of the surf world's most knowledgeable and respected writers. From the mid-1980s onward, he was widely recognized for his in-depth journalistic output. Carroll's biography of his brother Tom Carroll, TC, was partly an attempt to write about drug use in surfing, a topic he felt guilty about avoiding during his career as a journalist.

Carroll was interviewed by Caroline Jones for her Radio National radio program 'The Search for Meaning', expressing how riding a wave could bring about a catharsis akin to those described in practices such as Zen Buddhism.

== Recent projects ==
In 2019, Carroll was invited to address the Global Wave Conference on surf crowds.

In 2016, following a spate of shark attacks on the New South Wales north coast, Carroll, in his role as Coastal Watch spokesman, became a prominent advocate of shark nets to reduce attacks, however, many of his arguments were criticised for being inaccurate.

In 2019 Carroll created a set of videos to teach surfers how to help save drowning swimmers without endangering themselves in the process.

In 2025, Carroll teamed up with Hannah Anderson to launch a surf-culture podcast titled “We Shouldn't Be Friends”, described as "a playful, quizzical and highly informed look at modern surf culture."

== Personal life ==
Nick Carroll grew up surfing alongside his younger brother Tom Carroll on Sydney's northern beaches. He resides in Sydney with his wife Wendy and their two children, Madeleine and Jack.

== Bibliography ==
- Next Wave of World Surfing (ed) 1991 ISBN 978-1-558-59162-2
- Complete Guide To Surfing Your Best 2008 ISBN 978-0-957-73353-4
- Fearlessness 2007 ISBN 978-0-811-85481-8
- Visions of Tropical Islands: A Journey into the Exotic Surf Zone 2008 ISBN 978-0-957-73355-8
- Out the Back with Bondi Rescue: True stories behind the hit TV show 2009 ISBN 978-1-741-75908-2
- TC (with Tom Carroll) 2014 ISBN 978-0-957-73353-4
- The Carnival of the Animals: The Unlikely Story of Professional Surfing (with Sean Doherty) 2024 ISBN 978-0-143-78511-8
