= Martin Potter (surfer) =

Former professional surfer

Personal information
- Nickname: Pottz
- Born: 28 October 1965 (age 60) Blyth, Northumberland, England

Surfing career
- Sport: Surfing
- Best year: Ranked 1st on the ASP World Tour, 1989
- Sponsors: Astrodek
- Major achievements: ASP World Champion in 1989

Surfing specifications
- Stance: Regular (natural foot)

Martin "Pottz" Potter (born 28 October 1965 in Blyth, Northumberland, England), is a former professional surfer.

== Early life ==
Potter's parents emigrated to Durban, South Africa when he was two years old. He began surfing off the beaches of his hometown Durban at age 10. By the age of 15, he was surfing 20+ foot waves at the Banzai Pipeline surf break on Hawaii's North Shore. At the time, he was using the assistance of a jet-ski to 'tow-in' to the wave as an alternative to paddling. This pre-dated modern tow-in surfing and can help lay claim to Potter being one of 'tow-in' surfings pioneers. In his late teens his parents moved back to the UK to live. During this period Potter was competing on the surfing world tour.

== Professional surfing career ==
He became a pro in 1981 and In 1989 after claiming 6 tour victories from 25 events he became "World Surfing Champion". This would come fourteen years after learning to stand on a surfboard.

'Pottz' redefined competitive surfing through performing technically high-risk moves such as aerials (where a surfer is able to use the energy of a wave to launch themselves free of it together with their surfboard, and to land back down onto the water and continue on) and 360's (the surfer and surfboard rotate on a wave 360 degrees before continuing on), which were previously only performed in the domain of free surfing (as opposed to competitively). He was also responsible for the invention of several surfing maneuvers such as the "rock-n-roll" (the same as performed on a skateboard).

From his success as a world champion, he led the call for a new form of competitive surfing; a judging format based on "risky surfing" - i.e. higher scoring being given to bigger and more critical maneuvering - which eventually became an accepted standard on what is now known as the World Championship Tour (WCT). Pottz is a commentator for the WSL world tour.

== Personal life ==
Potter lives in Australia on the Mornington Peninsula in Victoria, with his wife and two children.

Achievements
Preceded by Barton Lynch	Association of Surfing Professionals World Champion (men's); 1989	Succeeded by Tom Curren
