= Frieda Zamba =

American surfer

Personal information
- Born: October 25, 1965 (age 60) Flagler Beach, Florida
- Height: 5 ft 5 in (165 cm)
- Weight: 110 lb (50 kg)

Surfing career
- Sport: Surfing
- Best year: 1984, 1985, 1986, 1988
- Major achievements: Four time ASP World Surfing Champion, Five time Surfer Poll Awards, East Coast Surfer Hall of Fame,

Surfing specifications
- Stance: goofy

Frieda Zamba (born October 25, 1965) is a four-time world surfing champion from the United States. She won three titles in a row from 1984 to 1986, then won again in 1988. She lives in Costa Rica.

Frieda Zamba was the youngest female to win a pro tour contest and the youngest surfing world champion ever. She went on to win three titles in a row and then fought back to win a fourth. Outright dangerous in small to mid-size surf, Zamba crossed the performance chasm that separated male and female surfers in the 80's and, based solely on performance, is regarded by many as the greatest female surfer ever.

Besides being a talented and tactical competitor Zamba was incredibly popular during her reign. She won 5 straight Surfer Poll awards from 1985 to 1989 and was profiled in a 1987 piece in Sports Illustrated titled "Queen of the Surf." In 1998 she was inducted into the Surfing Walk of Fame as that year's Woman of the Year; the Walk is in Huntington Beach, California. She is still hailed as a hero in her home town, being the obvious namesake for the Frieda Zamba Swimming Pool at the Palm Coast Aquatics Center in Palm Coast, Florida.

Frieda Zamba's surfing blurred the edges between male and female wave riders, and while that may be a cliché used when describing great women surfers, she proved it by regularly out-surfing male competitors. At a time when surfing finally demanded a global audience, Frieda Zamba was the undisputed queen of professional surfing.

Preceded by Kim Mearig	World surfing champion (Women); 1984 - 1986	Succeeded by Wendy Botha
Preceded by Wendy Botha	World surfing champion (Women); 1988	Succeeded by Wendy Botha
