= Lisa Andersen =

American surfer

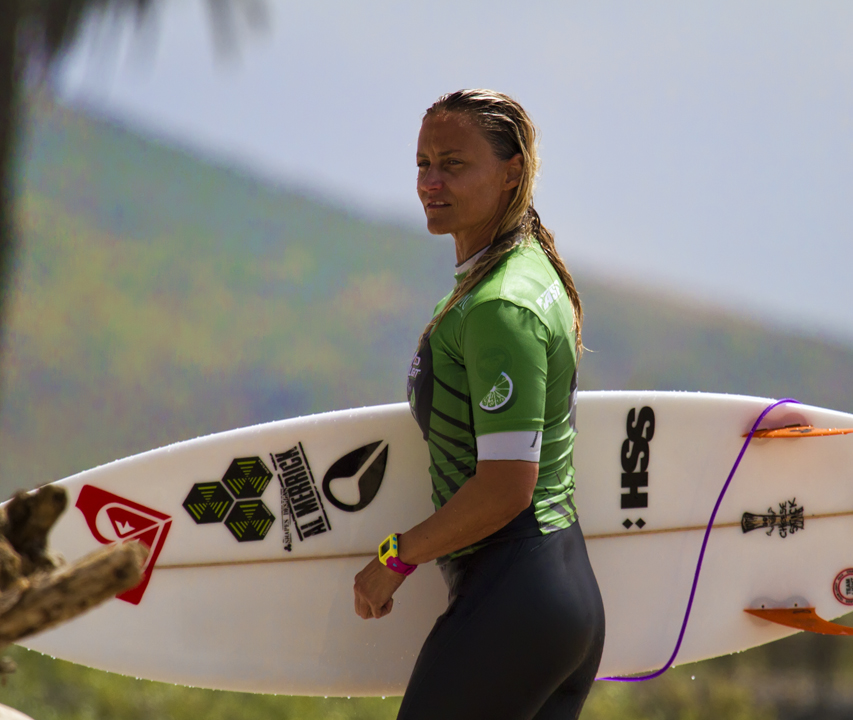
- Lisa Andersen at the 2011 Budlight Tour in San Onofre, CA.

Personal information
- Born: March 8, 1969 (age 57) Amityville, New York, U.S.
- Height: 5 ft 7 in (170 cm)

Surfing career
- Sport: Surfing
- Best year: 1997
- Major achievements: 4 x World Champion 1994, 1995, 1996, 1997; 1998 Conde Nast Female Athlete of the Year; Surfers' Hall of Fame (inducted 2002).; Surfing Walk of Fame in Huntington Beach, CA (inducted 2004)

Surfing specifications
- Stance: Regular

Lisa Andersen (born March 8, 1969) is an American four-time world surfing champion. She won four successive world titles from 1994 to 1997. She was named ASP's Rookie of the Year in 1987. She was named as one of the 100 "Greatest Sportswomen of the Century" by Sports Illustrated for Women. She was named the "1998 Female Athlete of the Year" by Conde Nast Sports for Women magazine. She is a two-times winner of Surfer Magazine's Readers Poll. In 2002, she was inducted into the Surfer's Hall of Fame. In 2004, she was inducted into the Surfing Walk of Fame (located in Huntington Beach, California) as that year's Woman of the Year.

She won the US amateur surfing title in 1987 and turned professional the following year. From 1994 to 1997 she won successive women's world titles before injury forced her to stop competing. She returned to the sport in 2000.

== Background ==
Andersen began surfing at the age of 15 in Ormond Beach, Florida. In the early 1980s women's surfing was underground, and surfing in general was seen as a man's sport. However, Andersen worked hard to impress her peers with her smooth but aggressive style. At 16, because of her parents disapproval of her love of surfing, she decided to run away to Huntington Beach, California to pursue her passion and train with the best surfers in America. Subsequently, she entered amateur competitions and won 35 National Scholastic Surfing Association trophies in eight months and, later, the US Championships at Sebastien Inlet in 1987. After this victory, she became a professional surfer and finished her first year on the tour ranked 12th and was elected Rookie of the Year. She won her first pro event in 1990 in Australia, but she struggled with remaining focused throughout the competitive season with the multiple contests over the span of a surfing year. She later found improved concentration after the birth of her first child, daughter Erika. Only a month after giving birth, she reached the final in Japan.

After battling back injuries and giving birth to her second child, Mason, Andersen semi retired in 2001 and moved into a global brand ambassador role with Roxy. She is the subject of Nick Carroll's biography "Fearlessness".

== Surfing career ==
Andersen became the Women's ASP World Champion in 1994, and won the title again in 1995, 1996 and 1997. She had won 22 ASP Women's championship Tour competitions.

== Personal life ==
Andersen has been married twice. Her first husband is the father of her daughter, and later Andersen married former professional baseball player Tim Shannon, on May 21, 2008, with whom she has a son.

Preceded by Pauline Menczer	World surfing champion (Women); 1994 - 1997	Succeeded by Layne Beachley
