= Rip Curl =

Australian surfing company

- Type: Subsidiary
- Industry: Retail
- Founded: 1969; 57 years ago in Torquay, Victoria, Australia
- Founder: Brian Singer; Doug Warbrick
- Headquarters: Torquay, Victoria, Australia
- Key people: Brooke Farris (CEO)
- Products: Sporting goods
- Parent: KMD Brands
- Website: www.ripcurl.com

Rip Curl is an Australian designer, manufacturer, and retailer of surfing sportswear (also known as boardwear) and accompanying products, and a major athletic sponsor. Rip Curl has become one of the largest surfing companies in Australia, Europe, South America, North America and South Africa. Globally, Rip Curl is considered a successful member of the "Big Three", of the surf industry alongside Quiksilver and Billabong.

Rip Curl is now present in several areas of board sports, including skateboarding/surfskating, freestyle skiing, snowboarding and wakeboarding. Some events in these other disciplines include the Rip Curl SurfSkate Festival, Rip Curl Wake, Skate and Music Festival, Rip Curl City Slam (skateboarding) and the Rip Curl World Heli Challenge (freestyle skiing and snowboarding).

== History ==
The name "Rip Curl" was taken from a vee-bottom surfboard that co-founder Warbrick bought in 1968, upon which he'd written "Rip Curl Hot Dog." The words didn't mean anything, he later admitted. "Except ripping was groovy; surfing the curl was groovy; we wanted to be groovy – so that was it."

— Matt Warshaw, Encyclopedia of Surfing

The company was founded in 1969 by Doug Warbrick and Brian Singer in Torquay, Victoria, Australia, and initially produced surfboards. In 1970, they decided to begin production of wetsuits, with an emphasis on transforming diving technology into a wetsuit suitable for surfing. Alan Green (co-founder of Quiksilver) was a Rip Curl employee in 1969 and developed the first Quiksilver boardshorts at the Rip Curl Factory in April 1970.

In 2019 Tim Baker wrote The Rip Curl Story, a book documenting the company's history. It is described as both a business primer and an adventure story.

In mid-2012, Singer and Warbrick engaged the services of Bank of America Merrill Lynch to sell the brand, but the plan was abandoned in March 2013. In October 2019, Rip Curl was sold to outdoor specialist company Kathmandu.

On 16 August 2021, Rip Curl appointed Brooke Farris as the chief executive officer.

== The Search ==
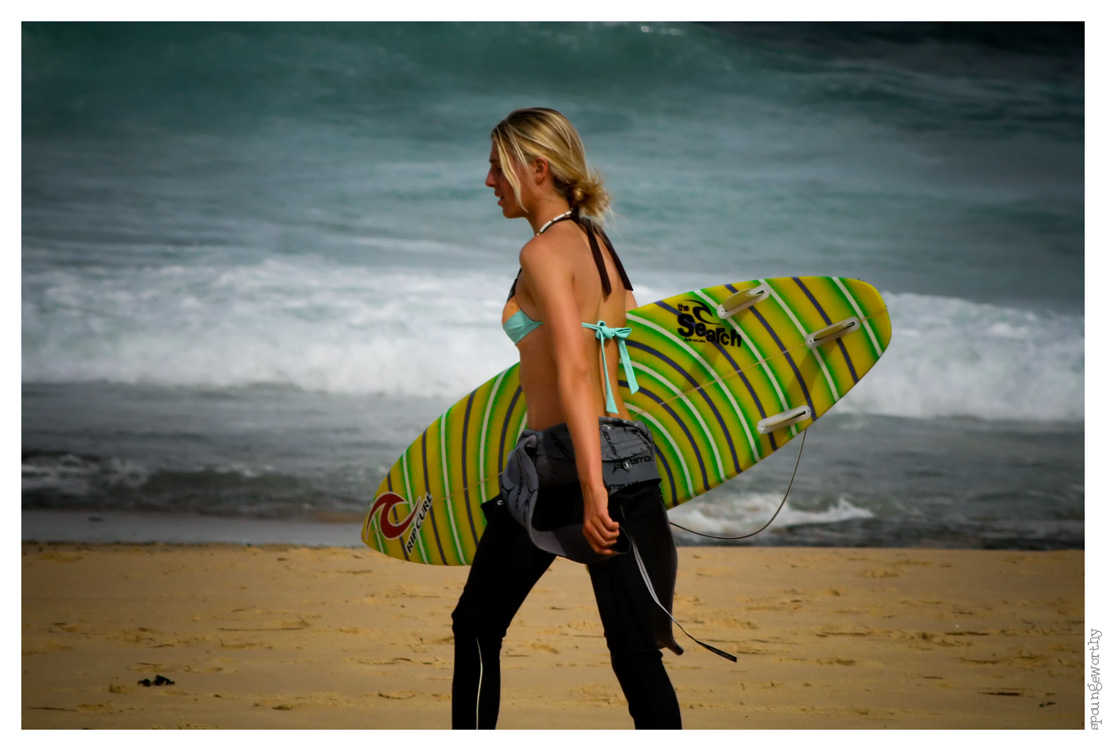
Rip Curl surfboard with thruster fins featuring branding for "The Search", Merewether Beach, NSW, March 2007

Rip Curl is responsible for a campaign called "The Search". Surf films by filmmaker Sonny Miller were created as part of the Search campaign: The Search (1992), The Search II (1993), Beyond the Boundaries: The Search III (1994), Feral Kingdom (1995), Tripping the Planet (1996) and Searching for Tom Curren (1996), which was awarded Video of the Year by Surfer magazine in 1997. In 2015 Rip Curl relaunched The Search.

== Awards ==
Rip Curl is known for manufacturing technical products and innovation in the surf industry. Rip Curl's "FlashBomb Wetsuit" won three consecutive SIMA (Surf Industry Manufacturers Association) awards for "Wetsuit of the Year" in 2011, 2012 and 2013.

The Rip Curl Group took home six wins at the 2017 SBIA Awards in Australia.

Rip Curl's marketing campaign "My Bikini" took home the SIMA Award for "Women's Campaign of the Year" in 2013, 2014, 2015, 2016 and 2019.

Rip Curl received the 2015 SIMA awards for Women's Marketing Campaign of the Year ("My Bikini"), Wetsuit Brand of the Year (Flash Bomb Zip Free), Accessory Product of the Year (SearchGPS Watch), Women's Swim Brand of the Year and Men's Boardshort of the Year (Mirage MF Driven).

Rip Curl received the 2017 SBIA awards for Men's Brand of the Year, Customer Service Team of the Year (Torquay Head Office), WA Account Manager of the Year, Ladies Swimwear Brand of the Year, Men's Boardshort of the Year (Mirage Connor Surge), Wetsuit of the Year (Flashbomb Chest Zip), Surfing Accessory of the Year (FLight Posse Backpack), Ladies Brand of the Year, QLD Account Manager of the Year.

Rip Curl received the 2019 SBIA awards for Product Innovation of the Year (Heatseeker), Wetsuit of the Year (Flashbomb Heatseeker), Mens Boardshort of the Year (Mirage 3 2 1), Ladies Swimwear Brand of the Year, Sales & Customer Service Office of the Year, Rip Curl National Customer Service WA, Account Manager of the Year, Vic/Tas Account Manager of the Year, Qld Account Manager of the Year, Ladies' Brand of the Year, Men's Brand of the Year.

== Retail stores ==
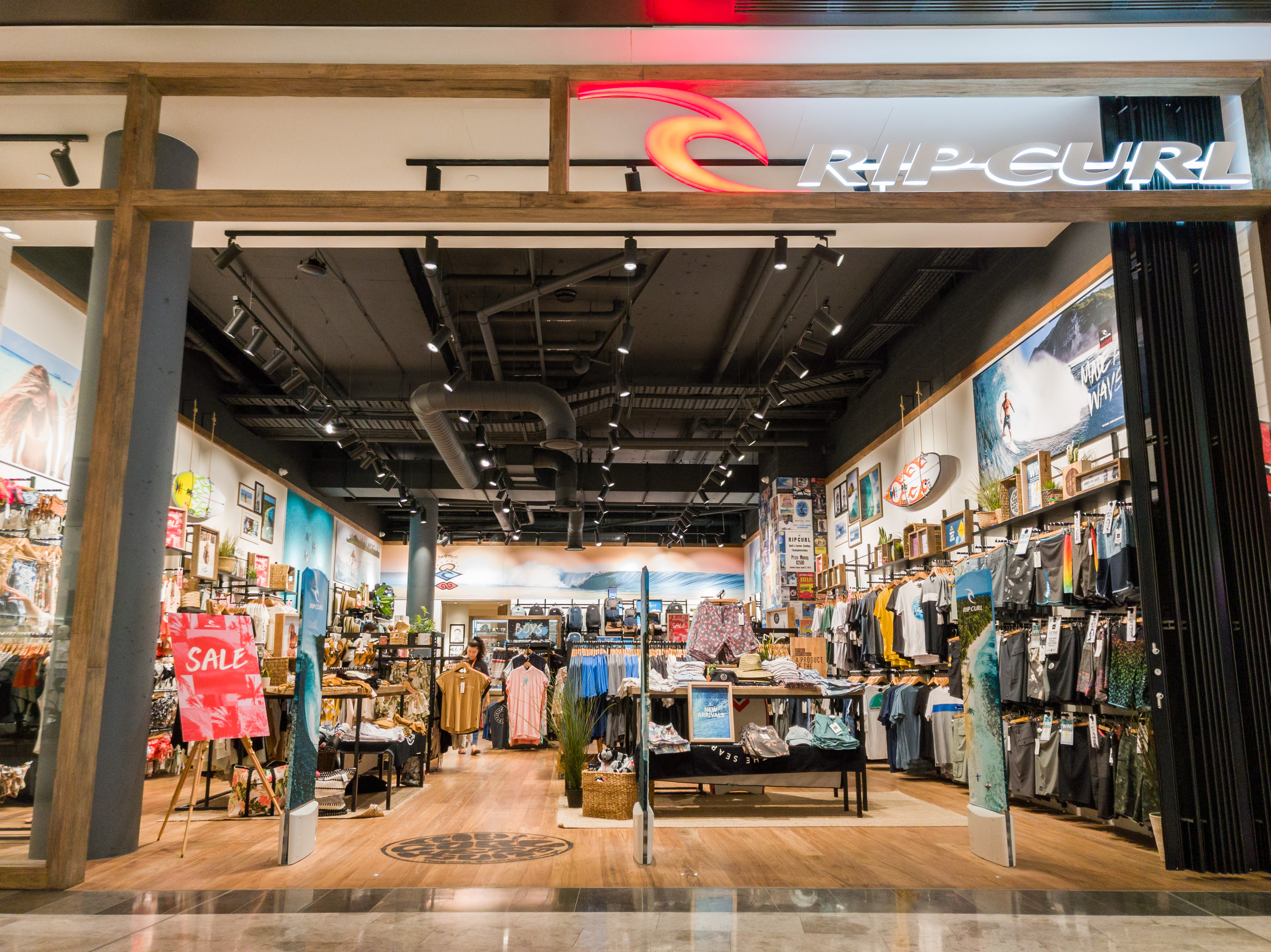
Rip Curl store in Westfield Carousel, Perth

- Australia/New Zealand: 61
- South America (most are licensees): 94
- North America: 29
- Africa and Middle East: 21
- Asia (Indonesia, Thailand, Singapore, Malaysia): 72
- Europe: 55

== Sponsored WCT World Tour events ==
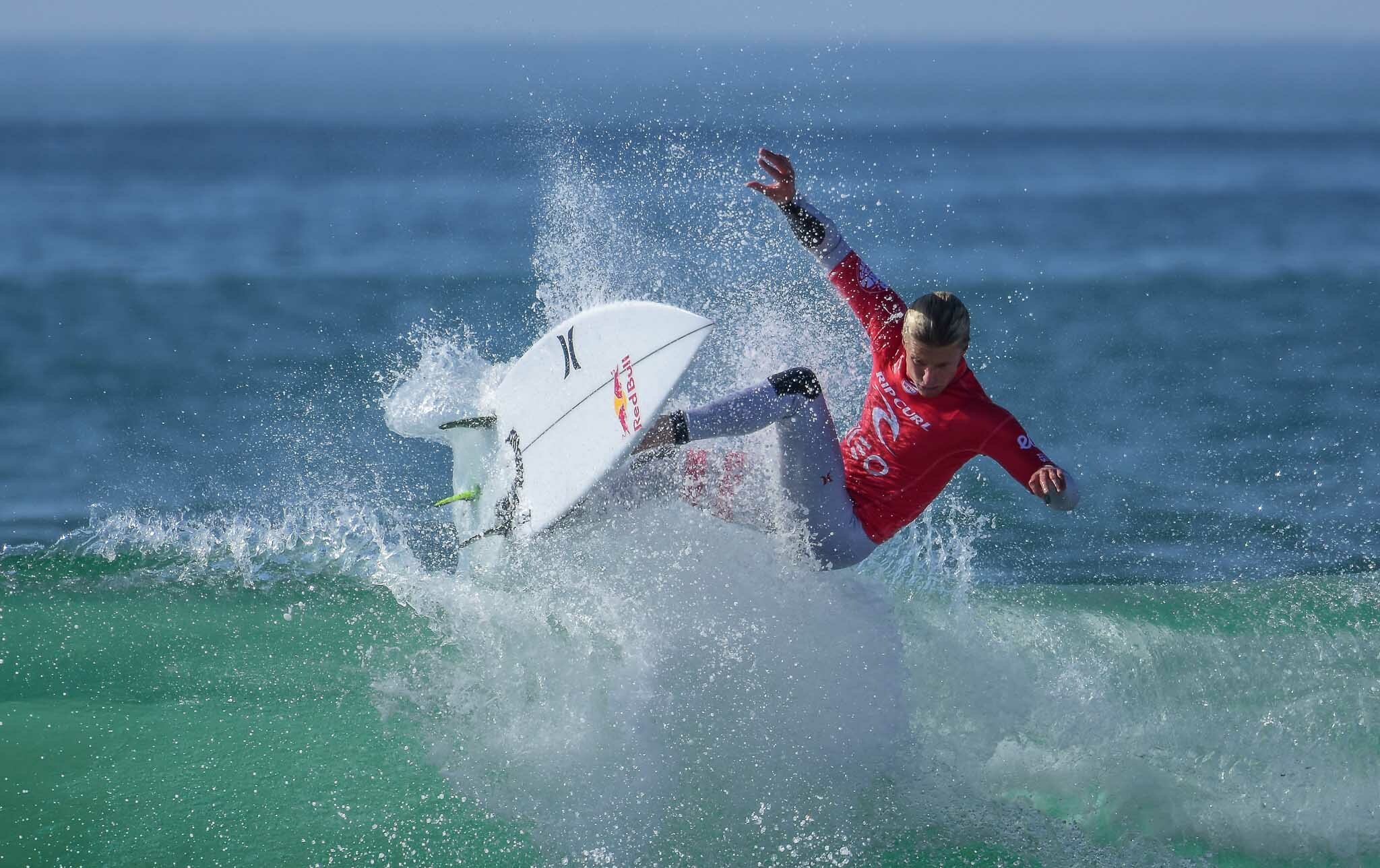
Surfer competing at the World Surf League event, sponsored by Rip Curl, in Peniche, Portugal

- Rip Curl Pro Bells Beach – Bells Beach, Jan Juc, Victoria, Australia
- Rip Curl Pro Portugal – Supertubos Beach, Peniche, Portugal
- Rip Curl Cup Padang Padang – Padang Padang, Uluwatu, Bali, Indonesia

== Sponsored athletes ==
- Stephanie Gilmore (As of July 2026)
- Mick Fanning (As of July 2026)
- Tom Curren (As of July 2026)
- Mason Ho (As of July 2026)
- Molly Picklum (As of July 2026)
- Owen Wright (As of July 2026)
- Morgan Cibilic (As of July 2026)
- Crosby Colapinto (As of July 2026)
- Samuel Pupo (As of July 2026)
- Jacob Willcox (As of July 2026)
- Erin Brooks (As of July 2026)
- Pauline Ado
- Grant Baker
- Teresa Bonvalot
- Pat Curren
- Bethany Hamilton
- Brisa Hennessy
- Rosy Hodge
- Xavier Huxtable
- Luke Hynd
- Matt McGillivray
- Gabriel Medina
- Dillon Perillo
- Bruno Santos
- Amuro Tuzuki
- Nikki van Dijk
- Matt Wilkinson
- Tyler Wright

=== Winners ===
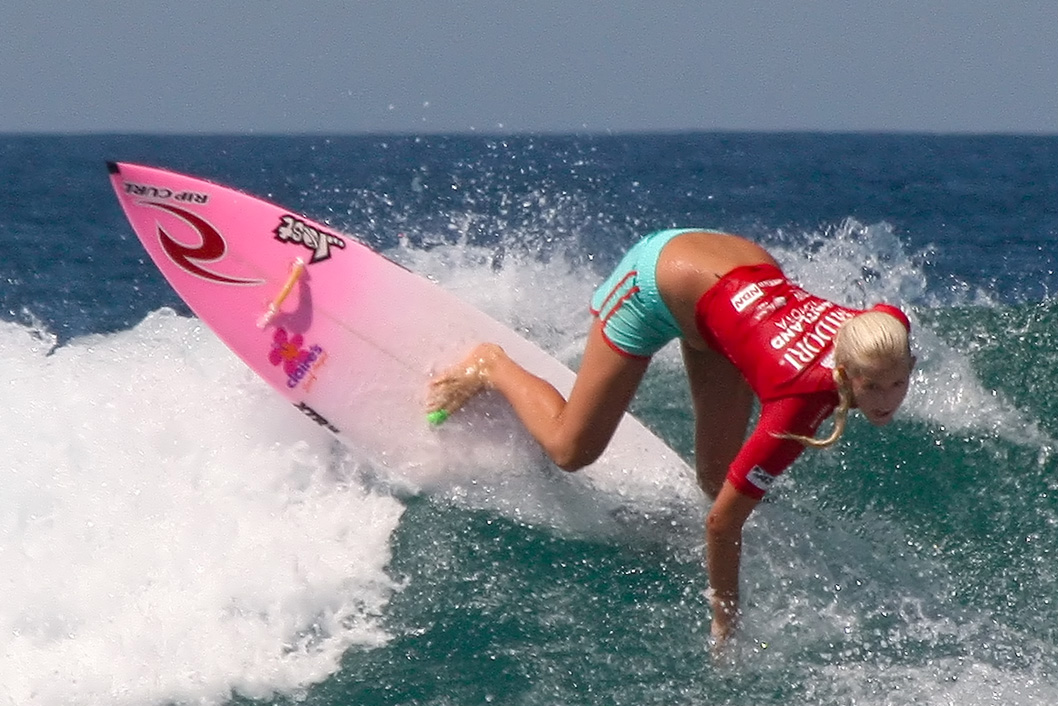
Bethany Hamilton

- Stephanie Gilmore won the WSL World Title eight times: in 2007, 2008, 2009, 2010, 2012, 2014, 2018, and 2022.
- Grant Baker won the 2013, 2016, and 2018 WSL Big Wave World Titles.
- Gabriel Medina won the WSL World Title in 2018 and the ASP World Title in 2014..
- Bethany Hamilton and Mick Fanning were inducted into the iconic Surfer's Hall of Fame in Huntington Beach in 2017.
- Tyler Wright won the WSL World Title in 2016.
- Mick Fanning won the ASP World Title three times, in 2007, 2009 and 2013.
- Tom Curren, won the World Title in 1985, 1986, 1990.

== See also ==
- List of fitness wear brands
