= Tom Carroll (surfer) =

Australian surfer (born 1961)

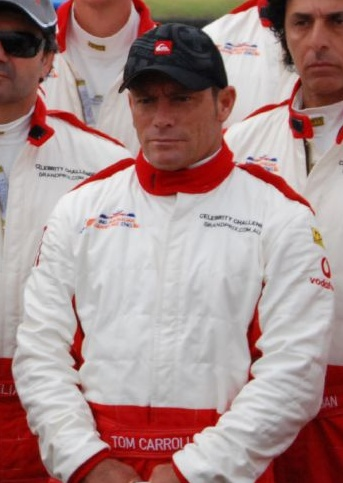

Personal information
- Born: Thomas Victor Carroll; 26 November 1961 (age 64) Newport, New South Wales, Australia
- Height: 169 cm (5 ft 7 in)
- Weight: 69 kg (152 lb)

Surfing career
- Sport: Surfing
- Best year: 1984
- Major achievements: WCT Title 1983, 1984

Surfing specifications
- Stance: Goofy

Thomas Victor Carroll (born 26 November 1961, Newport, New South Wales, Australia) is an Australian former professional surfer from Sydney. He won the Australian Junior Title in 1978, the Pro Juniors in 1977 and 1980, the 1983 and 1984 ASP World Tour, and the 1987, 1990 and 1991 Pipe Masters. He became the first surfing millionaire after signing a contract with Quiksilver in 1989.

== Pro tour highlights ==
Carroll made the finals of the 1979 Pipe Masters as a world tour rookie, finishing 24th in the world that same year. He continued to ascend from 17th to 10th to 3rd before taking the world title in 1983 (winning 6 of 13 events) and distinguishing himself as the first goofy foot world champion.

The following year he answered the challenge from veteran Shaun Tomson to win the championship again.

In 1985, he boycotted the South African leg of the tour in protest against apartheid and subsequently fell behind Tom Curren. Carroll finished 2nd the following year.

In 1988, he made history again by becoming the first surfer to secure a million dollar contract (with Quiksilver). He finished third that year and again in 1991 (taking the Triple Crown the same year) before retiring in 1993.

In total, Carroll took 26 career world tour wins, three Pipe Masters victories (87, 90, and 91), and two world titles.

== Media career ==
Carroll and fellow Australian big wave surfer Ross Clarke-Jones currently travel the world searching for large swells for the Discovery Channel television series Storm Surfers. In 2012, he appeared in the film Storm Surfers 3D.

== Awards and inductions ==
Carroll won the 1984 Surfer Poll and was inducted into the Australian Surfing Hall of Fame in 1990. In 1991, he won Australia's Surfing Life Peer Poll and 8 years later was inducted into the Huntington Beach Surfing Hall of Fame. He was inducted into the Sport Australia Hall of Fame in 1992.

He was voted in at Number 7 on Surfer Magazine's list of the "Greatest Surfers of All Time".

A portrait of him by artist Jan Williamson was hung in the Archibald Prize in 2000.

== Drug use ==
Carroll's drug use was documented in his biography, written in conjunction with his brother, the respected surf journalist and author Nick Carroll.

Carroll has experienced stimulant addiction, most notably 'Ice'. He has since rehabilitated and warns others about the use of stimulants, saying that the path to ice addiction is slippery and fraught with danger. In 2015 he participated in a documentary with Australia's ABC TV warning casual users not to be foolhardy.

== Video game appearances ==
Carroll is a playable character in the video game Kelly Slater's Pro Surfer.

Achievements
Preceded by Mark Richards	Association of Surfing Professionals World Champion (men's); 1983/84-1984/85	Succeeded by Tom Curren
