= Pauline Menczer =

Australian surfer (born 1970)

Pauline Menczer (born 21 May 1970) is an Australian surfer. She was Women's World Champion for Professional Surfing in 1993.

== Surfing career ==
Menczer started surfing aged 12 in about 1982. She won the 1988 women's amateur world title at the competition held in Puerto Rico, the 1993 women's world championship and was a long-standing competitor on the world championship tour.

In 1991 and 1992 Menczer was narrowly beaten in the world championship by Wendy Botha, but blitzed the field in 1993 becoming the women's world champion of professional surfers. In that year she qualified for half of the competition finals, and ended up the winner in a quarter of all the competitions. The trophy that she was awarded was damaged and she did not receive any financial award. She also was World Qualifying Series champion in 2002 from the event held in Hawaii. In a career over 20 years she won a total of 20 WCT events and 8 WQS events; only Layne Beachley has won more.

Menczer failed to requalify for the 2005 world championship tour. Her sponsors were Stick Girl Surfboards (California) and Ocean Shores Surf Shop.

In March 2018 Menczer was inducted into the Australian Surfing Hall of Fame.

== Personal life ==
Menczer grew up in Bondi, Australia, with her mother and three siblings. Her taxi-driver father was murdered when she was five. She attended Bondi Public and Dover Heights Girls’ High schools. She acquired the nickname 'Naughty Pauls' that continued into her surfing career. From age 14, and throughout her surfing career, Menczer suffered from sometimes crippling rheumatoid arthritis. Since 2019 she has had a rare autoimmune disease that affects her skin.

During her career Menczer travelled the surfing circuit with her "coach", but Nadege was really her French girlfriend.

In 2021 Menczer lived in Byron Bay and was working as a bus driver but has subsequently become a carer.

Her struggles, and that of other women to compete in a male dominated sport, is part of the movie Girls Can't Surf. The film's director Chris Nelius, lobbied Waverley Council to have a statue of Menczer erected at Bondi beach. The statue was unveiled in 2025. In 2022 an image of Menczer was added to the mural of surfers on Bondi beach boardwalk by artist Megan Hales.

== Films ==
Menczer has appeared in a number of surf videos featuring female surfers, including:

- Blue Crush by Bill Ballard (1998)
- Peaches: the Core of Women's Surfing by Bill Ballard (2000)
- Surfabout: Down Under by Jenny Hedley
- Girls Can't Surf by Chris Nelius (2021)

Preceded by Wendy Botha	World surfing champion (Women); 1993	Succeeded by Lisa Anderson
