= Tom Curren =

American surfer

- Born: July 3, 1964 (age 61); Newport Beach, California, U.S.
- Occupation(s): Surfer and musician
- Surfing career
- Height: 5 ft 10 in (178 cm)
- Weight: 160 lb (73 kg)
- Sport: Surfing

Thomas Roland Curren (born July 3, 1964) is an American former professional surfer, known for being the first American to win the World Surf League Title. He secured three World Titles in 1985, 1986, and 1990, and achieved 33 event wins in his career, the second most of all time, surpassed only by Kelly Slater. Curren is celebrated for his competitive drive and distinctive surfing style. He retired from competitive surfing in the mid-1990s.

== Professional career ==
Thomas Curren joined the ASP World Tour in 1983, where he competed against established professionals such as Rabbit Bartholomew, Shaun Tomson, and Cheyne Horan.

In 1990, at Margaret River, Curren rode a wave all the way from the take-off zone to the Rivermouth, roughly a 1200-foot ride. He then had to walk back to Mainbreak from the Rivermouth to re-enter the surf. Those who saw it say it has never been repeated, in or out of competition.

Curren still surfs in contests on the ASP World Qualifying Series (WQS.) He is also often invited to surf in World Championship Tour (WCT) trials or contests as a wildcard. He has competed in the Annual Switchfoot Bro-Am Surf Contest for 3 years in a row, surfing on the Switchfoot team.

In his five-year rise to World Surfing Champion, Curren appeared under a contract with surfboard company Channel Islands. He co-produced and rode pro surfboard models such as the Black Beauty and the Red Beauty.

Early in his professional career, he signed with OP swimwear then later changed sponsorships deals to Rip Curl Wetsuits and Clothing.

== The Fish Revolution ==
After his hiatus, Curren temporarily re-appeared at an ASP Surfing Competition in France in 1993, armed with a 1970s 5'5" Twin Fin he'd reportedly bought second hand in a New Jersey Surf Shop (Surfers Supplies in Ocean City, NJ). He entered and proceeded to beat Matt Hoy, who was ranked eighth in the world at the time. Curren showed the world how to use the fish board and how to use it with a modern style of surfing. Curren has collaborated on retro fish and egg designs with surf craft design engineer and fellow Santa Barbaran George Greenough.

== Cheers Tom ==
Curren is a playable character in the video game Kelly Slater's Pro Surfer.

Achievements
Preceded by Martin Potter	Association of Surfing Professionals World Champion (men's); 1990	Succeeded by Damien Hardman
Preceded by Tom Carroll	Association of Surfing Professionals World Champion (men's); 1985/86-1986/87	Succeeded by Damien Hardman
