= Pam Burridge =

Australian surfing world champion

Pam Burridge (born 26 July 1965) is an Australian surfer and one of the pioneers of women’s surfing in Australia.

Born in Sydney, she entered her first surfing competition in 1977, proceeding to win various regional and national titles in the following years. Burridge began competing internationally in 1981, and went on to win the women's ASP World Tour in 1990. She was inducted into the Sport Australia Hall of Fame in 1995, and given a place on Huntington Beach's Surfing Walk of Fame in 2017. After a hiatus from 1993 to 1996, Burridge continued surfing competitively until 1999 and now runs a surf school on the south coast of New South Wales.

In 1984, Burridge released a single in collaboration with then-love interest Damien Lovelock under the name Pam and the Pashions, titled Summertime All 'Round the World.

Sydney Ferries named a HarbourCat Pam Burridge in her honour.
