= Shark Island Challenge =

Bodyboarding event in Sydney, Australia

The Shark Island Challenge (SIC), held near Cronulla, in Sydney, New South Wales, Australia, is a World Tour event in bodyboarding since the elimination of the Teahupoo Challenge (Teahupoo) from the world bodyboarding tour.

== History ==
The Shark Island Challenge first started in 1997, and was a very informal and local event organized by Nathan Purcell and Mark Fordham. The championship would get increasing attention in the following years and was promoted to an international World Tour event sanctioned by the International Bodyboarding Association (IBA) in 2002, eventually turning out to be the premiere event of the tour when the Teahuppo Challenge was eliminated due to lack of financial sponsoring.

=== Results and conditions ===
==== 1997 ====
- Organizers: Nathan Purcell, Mark Fordham
- Waiting Period: Best day in May, later changed to best day in June due to lack of swell
- Format: 12 local riders vs. 12 invitees from Australia
- Results and prizes
  - 1. Matt Percy (A$10000)
  - 2. Steve Mackenzie (STC trip to Sumatra for a week)
  - 3. Chris Warr (A$700)
  - 4. Luke Miller (STC trip to G-land for a week)
  - 5. Nathan Purcell, Ben Player
- Sponsors: Ocean and Earth / Manta Bodyboards / The Surf Travel Company / Emerald Surf City / Cronulla house boats and sea planes
- Conditions: 1 - 1,5 meters (4 – 5 foot) offshore waves
- Footage: Secret Weapons by Chris Stroh

As the first Shark Island Challenge it was a very informal competition. Comments from the riders gives the notion that it was more like free-surfing. It could be argued that the low money prize and the fact that it did not scored points for the World Tour contributed to this relaxed feeling toward the competition in this year.

==== 1998 ====
- Organizers: Nathan Purcell, Mark Fordham
- Waiting Period: 1 July to 1 August (1 – 2 days event depending on conditions)
- Format: 12 local riders vs. 12 invitees from Australia, 2 rounds event
- Results and prizes
  - 1. Steve Mackenzie (A$1000 + trip 2 Tonga by STC)
  - 2. Matt Percy (STC trip to Tonga by week)
  - 3. Adam Smith (A$1200)
  - 4. Nathan Purcell (A$800)
- Sponsors: Ocean and Earth / Manta Bodyboards / The Surf Travel Company / Emerald Surf City
- Conditions:
  - 1st round: 1 – 2 meters (4 – 6 foot) waves with cross winds
  - 2nd round: 1 – 2 meters (4 – 6 foot) thundering tubular waves with offshore winds
- Footage: Rush - Shark Island Challenge by Chris Stroh

The second incarnation of the SIC showed bodyboarding legend Mike Stewart riding like no other. This time again the competition was on a relaxed mood, and despite the Hawaiian efforts the locals dominated the heats.

==== 1999 ====
- Organizers: Nathan Purcell, Mark Fordham
- Waiting Period: 11 June to 11 July (1 – 2 days event depending on conditions)
- Format: 12 locals vs. 12 invitees, 2 round event, six 1 hour 4 men heats, 3 best scoring waves counting each round
- Results and prizes
  - 1. Christian Riguccini (A$5000)
  - 2. Nathan Purcell (A$3000)
  - 3. Toby Player (A$2000)
  - 4. Adam Smith (A$1000)
  - 5. Ryan Hardy (A$750)
  - 6. Guilherme Tamega (A$750)
  - 7. Matt Percy (A$500)
  - 7. Warren Feinbier (A$500)
- Sponsors: Surf Dive ‘n' Ski / Manta Bodyboards / Ocean and Earth / The Surf Travel Company / Dream Weaver Surf adventures / [www.emeraldsurfcity.com] / Mike Perry / Peter Michaels Seafood and the Voodoo Lounge Cronulla
- Best move: Christian Riguccini, long tube ride with a huge roll on surge.
- Best barrel: Matt Percy
- Conditions: 1st (and only) round: 1 – 2 meters (4 – 6 foot) southeast ground swell with perfect conditions
- Footage: Rush - Shark Island Challenge by Chris Stroh

This year a promising and very anticipated swell for the beginning of June failed to show up and the competition had to be put on hold. Many stand-out invitees had to drop the contest due to previous scheduled trips (Mike Stewart, Spencer Skipper, Jeff Hubbard and Andre Botha). On Monday the 5th of July, with only six days left in the window, an unexpected 4 – 6 foot swell created perfect conditions for the Island. This was so unexpected that some prominent riders missed their heats (Steve Mackenzie, Paul Barnard and Damian King). The Island didn't break again with good condition to the end of the waiting period and the final results were taken from the first round scores. Brazilian Guilherme Tamega surfed Shark Island for the first time during the only day of competition.

==== 2000 ====
- Organizers: Mark Fordham, Nathan Purcell
- Waiting Period: 11 June to 11 July (1 – 2 days event depending on conditions)
- Format: 8 locals, 8 Australians, 8 internationals, 2 round event, six 1 hour 4 men heats, 3 best scoring waves counting each round
- Results and prizes
  - 1. Mike Stewart (A$6000)
  - =2. Damian King (A$2500)
  - =2. Ryan Hardy (A$2500)
  - 4. Dave Ballard - A$1000
  - 5. Andrew Lester - A$750
  - 6. Steve Mackenzie - A$750
  - 7. Adam Smith - A$500
  - 7. Toby Player - A$500
- Sponsors: Surf Dive ‘n' Ski / Mike Stewart Science / The Surf Travel Company / Dreamweaver Surf adventures / [www.emeraldsurfcity.com] / Wavecam / Mike Perry / Peter Michaels Seafood and the Voodoo Lounge Cronulla
- Best move: Ryan Hardy – Huge Invert over whiterock (the most dangerous and shallowest section of reef that sits near the takeoff zone)
- Best barrel: Mike Stewart
- Best wipeout: Nathan Purcell
- Conditions:
  - 1st round: 1,5 - 2,5 meters (6 – 8 foot) east/southeast swell offshore winds
  - 2nd round: Small 1 - 1,5 meters (4 – 6 foot) waves
- Footage: S.I.C - SDS, Mike Stewart - Shark Island Challenge 2000 by Chris Stroh

With very dangerous conditions on the first round, bodyboarding legend Mike Stewart dominated the competition, by maintaining a good average scoring on the second round small conditions he took the first place on this year's SIC. The locals, although yet a driving force in the competition, started to be replaced by international top bodyboarders on the top 10.

==== 2001 ====
- Organizers: Mark Fordham, Nathan Purcell
- Waiting Period: 21 June to 22 July (1 – 2 days event depending on conditions)
- Format: 10 locals, 8 Australians, 5 internationals, 2 round event, six 1 hour 4 men heats, 3 best scoring waves counting each round
- Results and prizes
  - 1. Damian King (A$10,000)
  - 2. Ryan Hardy (A$3000)
  - 3. Sean Virtue (A$2000)
  - 4. Dave Ballard (A$1000)
  - 5. Andrew Lester (A$800)
  - 6. Jeff Hubbard (A$700)
  - 7. Steve Mackenzie (A$600)
  - 7. Toby Player (A$500)
- Sponsors: Human / Custom X / Citizen Watches / The Surf Travel Co / Dreamweaver Surfing Adventures / Wave Cam / Wing Wetsuits / Emerald Surf City
- Best move: Ryan Hardy
- Best barrel: Simon Thornton
- Best wipeout: Ryan McKinnon
- Conditions:
  - 1st round: 2 - 2,5 meters (6+ - 8 foot) east with little north on the swell with light westerly wind
  - 2nd round: 2 - 2,5+ meters (6+ - 8+ foot) east with little north on the swell (a little bigger than on the 1st round)
- Footage: The Human Shark Island Challenge 2001 by Ian Stewart.

This year presented the heaviest wave conditions for a SIC ever. With former champion Mike Stewart pulling out of the competition due to family commitments, the stage was clear for the other performers. South African Alistair Taylor (bodyboarder) had to go to the hospital to check his injuries after receiving one of the worst wipeouts ever seen at Shark Island. International top bodyboarders dominated the competition with to be two-times world champion Damian King taking the lead.

==== 2002 ====
- Organizers: Mark Fordham, Nathan Purcell
- Waiting Period: 21 June to 22 July (1 – 2 days event depending on conditions)
- Format: 10 locals, 8 Australians, 5 internationals, 2 round event, six 1 hour 4 men heats, 3 best scoring waves counting each round
- Results and prizes
  - 1. Guilherme Tamega (US$6,000)
  - 2. Andrew Lester (US$3000)
  - 3. Damian King (US$2000)
  - 4. Jeff Hubbard (US$1600)
  - 5. Alistair Taylor (US$1200)
  - 6. Beau Day (US$800)
  - 7. Ben Player (US$400)
  - 8. Toby Player (US$400)
- Sponsors: Human / Rejected Clothing / Custom X / Gola / www.fluidzone.com / The Surf Travel Company / [www.emeraldsurfcity.com] * Best move: Kelley Hunt
- Best barrel: Andrew Lester
- Conditions:
  - 1st round: 1 - 1,5+ meters (4 - 6+ foot) with some cross-shore effect
  - 2nd round: 1 - 1,5+ meters (4 - 6+ foot) perfect conditions
- Footage: The Human Shark Island Challenge 2002 by Ian Stewart.

This was the first year that the Shark Island Challenge was run as an International sanctioned event of the World Tour. It was the first time Guilherme Tamega went to win the title, a feat he would repeat in the following two years to become the only person ever to win two or three consecutive SIC titles. He would eventually win his sixth world title that year.

==== 2003 ====
- Organizers: Mark Fordham
- Waiting Period: 28 June (Second time in history the event was held on one day, due to tides and lack of swell)
- Results and prizes
  - 1. Guilherme Tamega (US$6,000)
  - 2. Jeff Hubbard (US$3000)
  - 3. Doug Showell (US$1500)
  - 4. Damian King (US$1200)
  - =5. Dave Ballard, Dave Winchester (US$1000)
  - 7. Ryan McKinnon (US$650)
  - 8. Toby Player (US$650)
- Best move: Guilherme Tamega (ARS)
- Best barrel: Ryan McKinnon
- Conditions:
  - 1st round: 3–5 ft, swell was from the S/SE with perfect off-shore winds.

==== 2004 ====
- Organizers: Mark Fordham
- Waiting Period:
- Results and prizes
  - 1. Guilherme Tamega (US$6,000)
  - 2. Dave Ballard (US$2600)
  - 3. Damian King (US$2200)
  - 4. Josh Kirkman (US$1800)
  - 5. John Showell (US$1500)
  - 6. Dave Winchester (US$1300)
  - 7. Andrew Lester (US$1050)
  - 8. Graham Miller (US$1050)
- Best move: Guilherme Tamega (Air roll)
- Best barrel: Dave Winchester
- Conditions:
  - 1st round: 4–6 ft (occasional 8f series), East swell
  - 2nd round: 4–6 ft

==== 2005 ====
The event did not conclude due to lack of surfing conditions. On the 26th day of the waiting period, with only 2 days left to its conclusion, the event was canceled in the quarter-finals with no swell forecast for the following days. The 16 competitors that reached the quarter-finals shared the A$50,000 prize.

==== 2006 ====
- Organizers: Mark Fordham
- Waiting Period: June 27 to July 31, 2006
- Results and prizes
  - 1. Ryan Hardy (A$20,000)
  - 2. John Showell (A$3,000)
  - 3. Damian King (A$2,000)
  - 4. Jeff Hubbard (A$1,400)
- Best move: Jeff Hubbard (Invert)
- Best barrel: Damian King
- Conditions:
  - 1st, 2nd round: 4–8 ft
