= World Tour (bodyboarding) =

International Bodyboarding Corporation
- Sport: Bodyboarding
- Abbreviation: IBC
- Founded: 2020
- Regional affiliation: Spain
- Replaced: APB
- (founded): 2014

Official website
- www.ibcworldtour.com

== Current ==
In 2020, the International Bodyboarding Corporation was created in order to run the bodyboarding world tour. For the period of 2020 to 2021, the IBC couldn't effectively run a tour due to the COVID-19 pandemic which impacted global travel. The IBC Bodyboarding World Tour consists of 6 divisions: Men, Women, Dropknee, Junior Men, Junior Women and Master Women.

=== Tour details ===
How each division is awarded the 2022 World Champion Title.

- Men and Women: 4 best results
- Junior Men: Best result + Fronton King event
- Junior Women: Best result + Sintra Pro event
- Dropknee: Best result + Sintra Pro event
- Master Women: Single event winner - Wahine Bodyboard Pro

== History ==
The first ever bodyboarding world tour was set up and created by the GOB (Global Organisation of Bodyboarders) in 1994. The GOB remained the controlling organisation of the tour up to 2002. In the final 3 years under the GOB, the tour was developed into a 'Super Tour'. In 2003, the IBA (International Bodyboarding Association) was formed, and they ran the world tour for 10 years, with their final year of being in charge being 2013. The Association of Professional Bodyboarders was formed in 2014 and the APB became the controlling body for the bodyboarding world tour. At the end of 2019, the APB was shut down.

== Bodyboarding World Champions ==
=== Men ===
Year	Competition	Winner	Country
1982	International Morey Boogie Bodyboard Pro Championships	Daniel Kaimi	Hawaii
1983	International Morey Boogie Bodyboard Pro Championships	Mike Stewart	Hawaii
1984	International Morey Boogie Bodyboard Pro Championships	Mike Stewart	Hawaii
1985	Not held		
1986	International Morey Boogie Bodyboard Pro Championships	Ben Severson	Hawaii
1987	International Morey Boogie Bodyboard Pro Championships	Mike Stewart	Hawaii
1988	International Morey Boogie Bodyboard Pro Championships	Mike Stewart	Hawaii
1989	International Morey Boogie Bodyboard Pro Championships	Mike Stewart	Hawaii
1990	International Morey Boogie Bodyboard Pro Championships	Mike Stewart	Hawaii
1991	International Morey Boogie Bodyboard Pro Championships	Mike Stewart	Hawaii
1992	International Morey Boogie Bodyboard Pro Championships	Mike Stewart	Hawaii
1993	International Morey Boogie Bodyboard Pro Championships	Michael Eppelstun	Australia
1994	International Morey Boogie Bodyboard Pro Championships	Mike Stewart	Hawaii
1994	GOB World Tour	Guilherme Tamega	Brazil
1995	GOB World Tour	Guilherme Tamega	Brazil
1996	GOB World Tour	Guilherme Tamega	Brazil
1997	GOB World Tour	Guilherme Tamega	Brazil
1998	GOB World Tour	Andre Botha	South Africa
1999	GOB World Tour	Andre Botha	South Africa
2000	GOB Super Tour	Paulo Barcellos	Brazil
2001	GOB Super Tour	Guilherme Tamega	Brazil
2002	GOB Super Tour	Guilherme Tamega	Brazil
2003	IBA World Tour	Damian King	Australia
2004	IBA World Tour	Damian King	Australia
2005	IBA World Tour	Ben Player	Australia
2006	IBA World Tour	Jeff Hubbard	Hawaii
2007	IBA World Tour	Ben Player	Australia
2008	IBA World Tour	Uri Valadao	Brazil
2009	IBA World Tour	Jeff Hubbard	Hawaii
2010	IBA World Tour	Amaury Lavernhe	France
2011	IBA World Tour	Pierre-Louis Costes	France
2012	IBA World Tour	Jeff Hubbard	USA (Hawaii)
2013	IBA World Tour	Ben Player	Australia
2014	APB World Tour	Amaury Lavernhe	France
2015	APB World Tour	Jared Houston	South Africa
2016	APB World Tour	Pierre-Louis Costes	France
2017	APB World Tour	Iain Campbell	South Africa
2018	APB World Tour	Jared Houston	South Africa
2019	APB World Tour	Tristan Roberts	South Africa
2020	IBC World Tour	(No tour) Covid-19	--
2021	IBC World Tour	(No tour) Covid-19	--
2022	IBC World Tour	Tristan Roberts	South Africa
2023	IBC World Tour	Tanner McDaniel	USA (Hawaii)
2024	IBC World Tour	Armide Soliveres	Spain
2025	IBC World Tour	Uri Valadao	Brazil

=== Junior Men ===
Year	Competition	Winner	Country
2022	IBC World Tour	Jorge Hernández	Spain

=== Women ===
Year	Competition	Winner	Country
1987	International Morey Boogie Bodyboard Pro Championships	Glenda Kozlowski	Brazil
1988	Not held		
1989	International Morey Boogie Bodyboard Pro Championships	Glenda Kozlowski	Brazil
1990	International Morey Boogie Bodyboard Pro Championships	Stephanie Pettersen	Brazil
1991	International Morey Boogie Bodyboard Pro Championships	Glenda Kozlowski	Brazil
1992	International Morey Boogie Bodyboard Pro Championships	Mariana Nogueira	Brazil
1993	International Morey Boogie Bodyboard Pro Championships	Stephanie Pettersen	Brazil
1994	GOB World Tour	Stephanie Pettersen	Brazil
1995	GOB World Tour	Mariana Nogueira	Brazil
1995	GOB World Tour	Claudia Ferrari	Brazil
1996	GOB World Tour	Daniela Freitas	Brazil
1997	GOB World Tour	Daniela Freitas	Brazil
1998	GOB World Tour	Mariana Nogueira	Brazil
1999	GOB World Tour	Karla Costa Taylor	Brazil
2000	GOB World Tour	Soraia Rocha	Brazil
2001	GOB World Tour	Soraia Rocha	Brazil
2002	GOB World Tour	Stephanie Pettersen	Brazil
2003	IBA World Tour	Neymara Carvalho	Brazil
2004	IBA World Tour	Neymara Carvalho	Brazil
2005	IBA World Tour	Kira Llewellyn	Australia
2006	IBA World Tour	Marina Taylor	Canary Islands
2007	IBA World Tour	Neymara Carvalho	Brazil
2008	IBA World Tour	Neymara Carvalho	Brazil
2009	IBA World Tour	Neymara Carvalho	Brazil
2010	IBA World Tour	Isabela Sousa	Brazil
2011	IBA World Tour	Eunate Aguirre	Spain
2012	IBA World Tour	Isabela Sousa	Brazil
2013	IBA World Tour	Isabela Sousa	Brazil
2014	APB World Tour	Alexandra Rinder	Canary Islands
2015	APB World Tour	Alexandra Rinder	Canary Islands
2016	APB World Tour	Isabela Sousa	Brazil
2017	APB World Tour	Joana Schenker	Portugal
2018	APB World Tour	Ayaka Suzuki	Japan
2019	APB World Tour	Sari Ohhara	Japan
2020	IBC World Tour	(No tour) Covid-19	--
2021	IBC World Tour	(No tour) Covid-19	--
2022	IBC World Tour	Isabela Sousa	Brazil
2024	IBC World Tour	Maira Viana	Brazil
2025	IBC World Tour	Alexandra Rinder	Austria

=== Junior Women ===
Year	Competition	Winner	Country
2022	IBC World Tour	Luna Hardman	Brazil

=== Dropknee ===
Year	Competition	Winner	Country
2018	APB World Tour	Sammy Morretino	Hawaii
2019	APB World Tour	Sammy Morretino	Hawaii
2020	IBC World Tour	(No tour) Covid-19	--
2021	IBC World Tour	(No tour) Covid-19	--
2022	IBC World Tour	Dave Hubbard	Hawaii

== See also ==
- World Surf League
