= Don King (photographer) =

American photographer and film director

Don King (born 1960) is an American photographer, cinematographer, and film director. He is best known for his photographic and cinematic images of ocean surface waves and surfing.

Don King was a high school sophomore the first time he sold a photograph. The purchaser was Surfing Magazine, which used it on its cover of an issue.

After graduation from Punahou School in 1978, King attended Stanford University where he majored in psychology, belonged to the Delta Tau Delta fraternity, and was on the Stanford Cardinal water polo team which won the NCAA Men's Water Polo Championships of 1978, 1980 and 1981. He graduated from Stanford in 1983.

Born and raised in Hawaii, Don King lives on Oʻahu with his wife Julianne Yamamoto King and their sons Beau, Aukai and Dane.

== Cinematography ==
This is a very incomplete list of King's camera and direction credits in film and television.

- 1987: North Shore
- 1988: The Tribal Trials bodyboarding video with Jack Lindholm, Ben Severson, and Mike Stewart
- 1994: The Endless Summer II
- 1995: The Living Sea
- 1997: "Tidal Wave" episode, Discovery Channel Raging Planet series
- 1998: City of Angels
- 1999: Surfing for Life
- 2000: Cast Away
- 2001: "The Big Squish" and "Blue Holes" episodes, National Geographic Channel The Next Wave series
- 2002: Heart of the Sea, award-winning documentary of the life of surfing champion Rell Sunn.
- 2002: Blue Crush
- 2002: Die Another Day
- 2002: "Condition Black" episode, Nature series
- 2003: Step into Liquid
- 2004: Riding Giants
- 2005: "Violent Hawaii" episode, Nature series
- 2005: Lords of Dogtown
- 2006: Beautiful Son
- 2008: Forgetting Sarah Marshall 2nd Unit D.P.
- 2009: Dear John water unit D.P.
- 2010: Hereafter water camera operator
- 2011: Soul Surfer 2nd unit D.P., B-camera operator
- 2011: The Descendants water camera operator
- 2011: Just Go With It water camera operator
- 2011: Pirates of the Caribbean: On Stranger Tides water camera operator
- 2011: Off the Map water camera operator, B-camera operator
- 2012: Battleship water camera operator, C-camera operator

Television

- 2003-2010: Lost camera operator 6 seasons
- 2008 Entourage
- 2007: Lost episode, season 3 finale "Through the Looking Glass"

Commercials

- American Express "Laird" - Director, Cinematographer
- Cool Water/Davidoff - Director, cinematographer
- Apple - water cinematographer
- Armani - water cinematographer
- Hyundai - water cinematographer
- Coca-Cola - water cinematographer
- Guinness - water cinematographer
- Norwegian Cruise lines - water cinematographer
- Johnson & Johnson - water cinematographer
- Maytag - water cinematographer
- Toyota -water cinematographer
- Weight Watchers -water cinematographer
- E Harmony -water cinematographer
- Kaiser -water cinematographer
- 2006: SHISEIDO TSUBAKI in Japan - water cinematographer
- 2011: Nike Commercial water cinematographer

Music Video

- Mariah Carey
- Sugarland

One thing that earns King such raves is his mellow personality—in a type-A industry, he's renowned for keeping his cool. Another is his sheer water sense and athletic ability—tall and lanky, he was once a competitive swimmer and college water-polo player and has long been a top-notch bodysurfer. It's that watersports background, he says, that allows him to bob nonchalantly at the ground zero of huge, punishing waves, holding his shot until the last possible second before diving to avoid the surfer's slashing fins and the wave's crushing lip.… And then there's King's legendary eye for the shot. "Don has an uncanny ability to hit the button only when it's magic," says Jai Mansson, who works with King often as assistant cameraman. "He's like a Zen master."

— Derek Ferrar, Hana Hou!
