= Mister Pipeline =

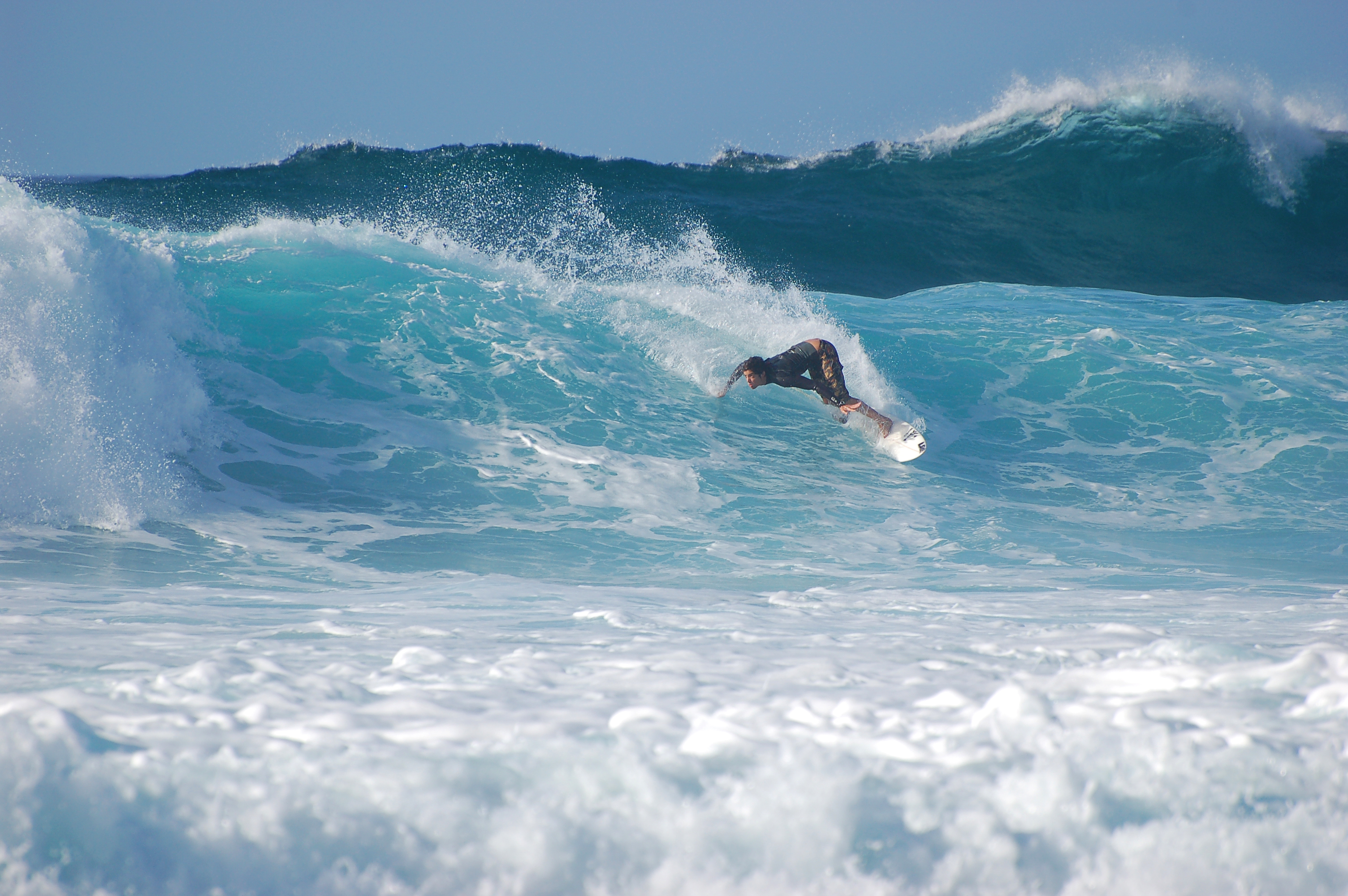
Surfer at Banzai Pipeline, North Shore, Oahu.

Mister Pipeline is a title given to masters of the waves at the North Shore's Pipeline. It was first given to Butch Van Artsdalen, and is passed on from generation to generation, by consensus. During this year, the Pipeline was at the forefront of surfing competitions. This first initial competition was sponsored by Continental Airlines, giving the winner a share of $500. Hakman rode six- to eight-foot waves for hours despite the conditions, being a leader in the big-wave riders at Pipeline. While Hakman dominated the first year of the competition, newcomer Michael Armstrong stunned the event by clinging to second place and a $250 prize. Corky Carroll took third place with a $150 prize. Other holders of the title have included sometime actor Gerry Lopez and bodyboarding legend Mike Stewart.

In 1972, Gerry Lopez was a surfer who made an ever-lasting impression on the Pipe Masters at Banzai Pipeline. In front of the world, ABC sports broadcast this event with the winner gaining $1,750. He was among the first to master the powerful, hollow waves at Ehukai Beach known as the Banzai Pipeline. This, along with his reputation for riding switchfoot in the large surf at Waimea Bay, earned him the nickname "Mr. Pipeline." Six surfers had been invited to the competition. Jeff Hakman, Gerry Lopez, Sam Hawk, Larry Bertlemann, Jimmy Blears, and Mike Armstrong. The highlight of the event was largely focused on Lopez, riding out in an eight-foot wave and tube during the competition.

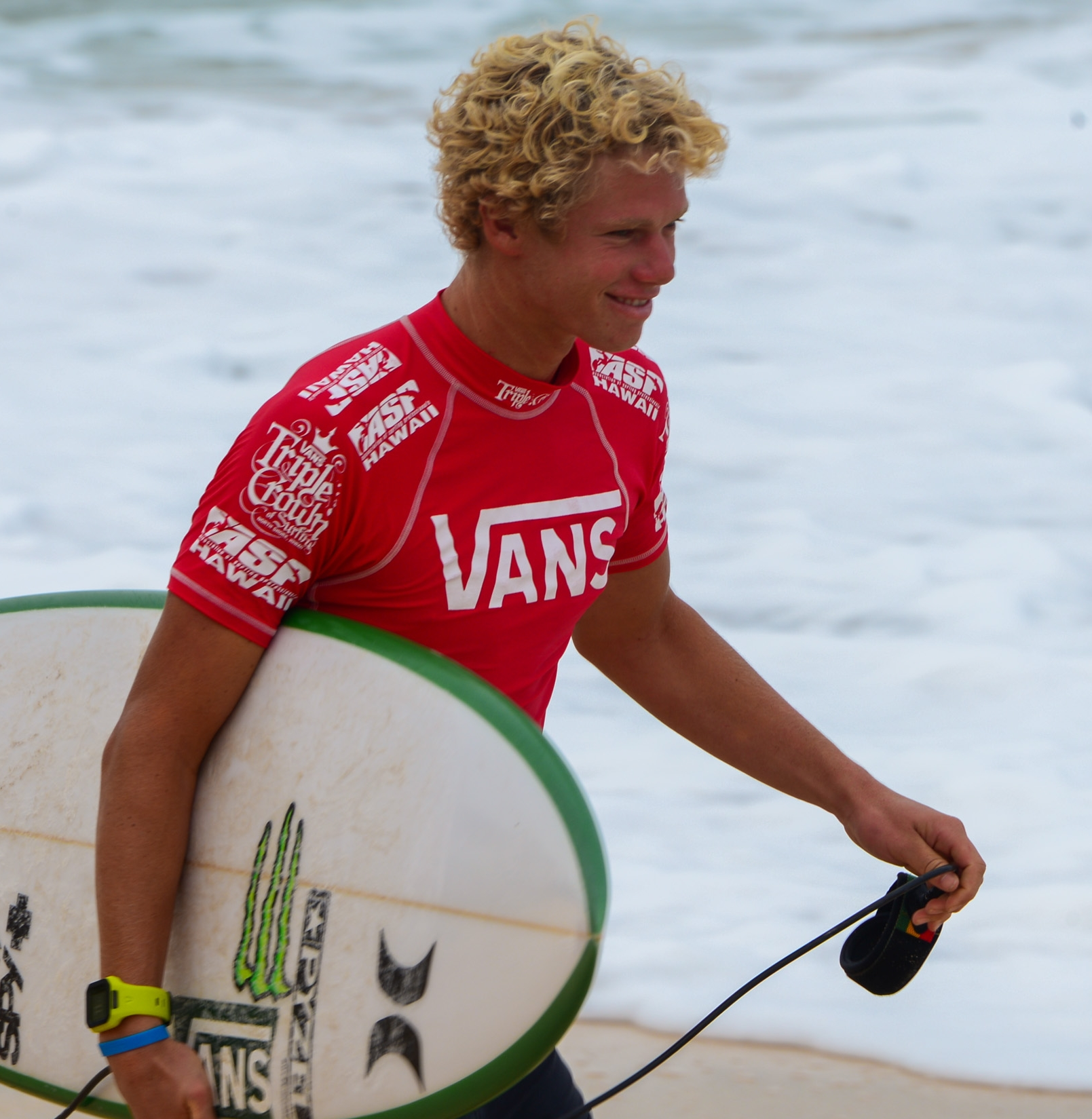
John John Florence is well known for his contribution to the Pipeline Masters and continues to withhold titles since 2020 against Gabriel Medina.

== Today's Pipeline ==
Starting in the 1970s and continuing to the present, the Pipeline Masters is a surfing competition known for its difficulty. Over recent decades, the Pipeline has held a significant role in the surfing community.

== History of The Water ==
The all intimidating, but ferocious beach of the Pipeline stands as one of the most important waves to surf. It performs best when there is a swell from the west or northwest, typically shining from October through March, like many other breaks along the North Shore. Though "Pipeline" technically denotes the left-breaking wave, it commonly encompasses Backdoor as well, the right-breaking wave adjacent to its peak. When the swell approaches from the north or northwest, both waves come to life, allowing surfers to ride them simultaneously, with one on the Pipeline and the other on Backdoor.

Various claims exist regarding the first surfer to conquer Pipeline, but the credit often goes to Phil Edwards from California. He ventured out on a four-foot swell at what was then known as Banzai Beach in mid-December 1961. Returning the next morning with filmmaker Bruce Brown, they encountered waves reaching six to eight feet. Edwards masterfully rode an exquisite eight-foot tube, immortalized in Brown's 1962 surf film "Surfing Hollow Days." The moniker "Pipeline" was coined by Californian boardmaker Mike Diffenderfer, who, inspired by the waves' resemblance to massive concrete pipes in a nearby construction project, suggested the name to Brown.
