= Alexandre de Pontes =

Brazilian bodyboarder (1968–1993)

Personal information
- Born: 1968 Brazil
- Died: 1993 (aged 24–25) Portugal

Sport
- Sport: Bodyboarding

Alexandre de Pontes (1968–1993), also known as Xandinho, was a Brazilian bodyboarder, and one of the first Brazilians to gain widespread international recognition in the sport. He was the first Brazilian to reach the finals in the Pipeline world bodyboarding championship. He died in a car accident in Portugal when returning to the airport for a flight back to Brazil.

Six-time world champion Guilherme Tâmega considers Xandinho one of the two greatest bodyboarders of all time, with legend Mike Stewart.
