= Jamie O'Brien (surfer) =

American surfer

Personal information
- Nickname: JOB
- Born: James Duncan O'Brien; 9 June 1983 (age 43) Kahuku, Hawaii
- Years active: 2001–present
- Height: 6 ft 2 in (1.88 m)
- Weight: 208 lb (94 kg)
- Website: jamieobrien.com

Surfing career
- Sport: Surfing
- Career earnings: $122,400
- Sponsors: Buell wetsuits, Red Bull, GoPro, Tokoro surfboards, Nectar sunglasses, Tools, Vestal Watches, Cariuma, Blenders Eyewear, GMC Honolulu
- Major achievements: 2003 Hansen Pipeline Pro winner; 2004 Billabong Pipeline Masters winner; 2004 Fosters Expression Trestles winner; 2009 Rip Curl Invitational winner; 2010 Volcom Pipeline Pro; Surfers' Hall of Fame inductee

Surfing specifications
- Stance: Natural (regular) foot
- Shaper: Wade Tokoro
- Favourite waves: Pipeline
- Favourite maneuvers: Barrels

James Duncan O'Brien (born June 9, 1983) is a professional surfer from the North Shore, Hawaii.

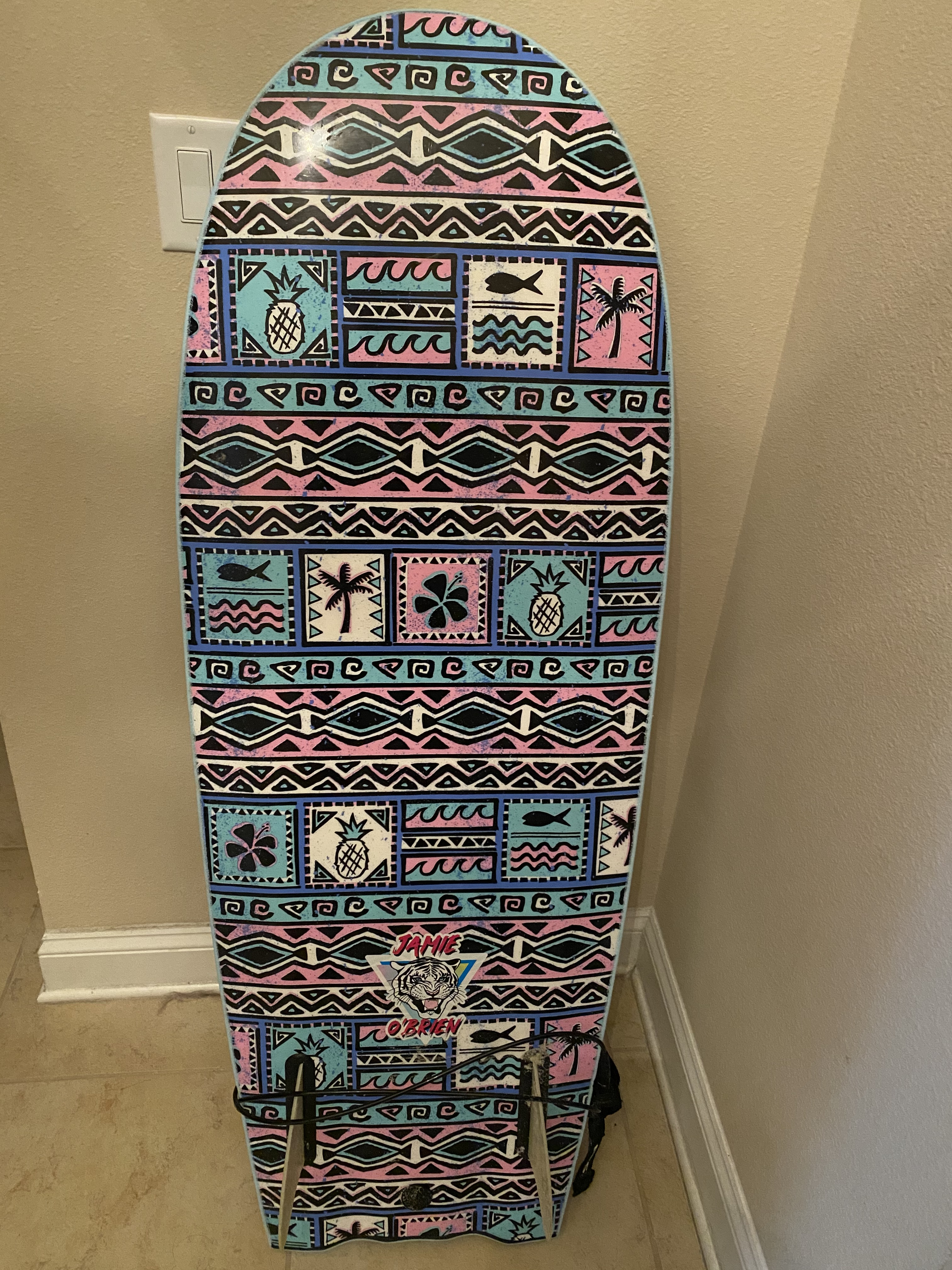
One of Jamie O'Brien's signature Beater Board models from Catch Surf.

== Career ==
O'Brien grew up near one of the most notorious waves on the planet, with a home in front of the Banzai Pipeline, on the surfing Mecca of Oahu's North Shore. He started competing in local surf contests when he was about six years old and carried on into his early 20s. O'Brien has said that he was fortunate as a child to grow up near the Banzai Pipeline. He is one of the youngest surfers to win a Pipeline Masters.

Jamie's father, Australian Mick O'Brien, was a lifeguard. Jamie has said that one of the things that got him interested in surfing was talking to many of the regular surfers on his dad's beach.

O'Brien took fourth place in the Pipeline Masters in 2001, first place in Hansen's Pipeline Pro in 2003, first place in the 2004 Fosters Expression Trestles and the Rip Curl Pipeline Masters at 21 years of age, 1st in the 2009 Rip Curl Invitational, and first in the inaugural Volcom Pipe Pro back in 2010. He has won events in the WSL qualifying series and the championship tour.

O'Brien produced two surfing films, Freakshow and Freakside. He appeared in Step into Liquid and Blue Crush. He is the star of the video series "Who is JOB," which ended with the final episode posted on Oct 18, 2019, for a total of 9 seasons on YouTube.

In 2005 O'Brien received Surfer Magazine's Boost Breakthrough Performer of the Year Award for an up-and-coming athlete with an impact on the sport for years to come.

In 2016 O'Brien assisted in the rescue of a bodyboarder who had wiped out and was drowning, by paddling out with a foam board to help Guilherme Tamega who was trying to bring the victim to shore.

O’Brien runs the Jamie O’Brien Surf Experience, a surf school.
