= Eppo =

Eppo or EPPO may refer to:

- European and Mediterranean Plant Protection Organization
- European Public Prosecutor's Office, an independent body of the European Union
- Poznań–Ławica Airport, by ICAO code
- Eppo (comics), a Dutch comic magazine

== People with the name ==
- Michael Eppelstun, Australian surfer
- Eppo Bruins (born 1969), Dutch politician
- Eppo Cremers (1923–1896), Dutch politician
- Eppo Doeve (1907–1981), Dutch painter and cartoonist
