= Sandy Beach, Hawaii =

Beach in Hawaii

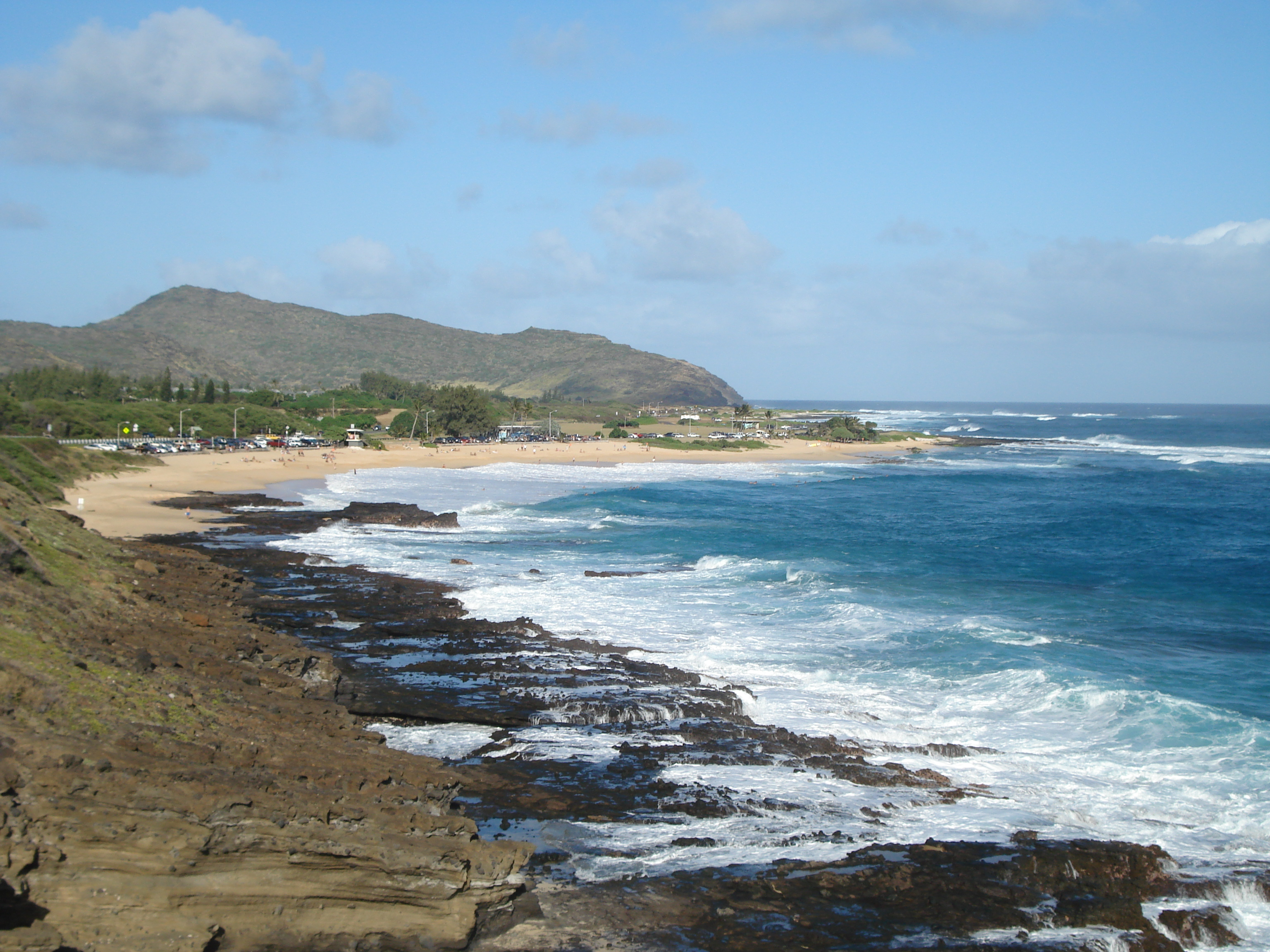
Hawaiʻi Kai's Sandy Beach

Sandy Beach, also referred to as "Sandy's" and known to Hawaiians as Wāwāmalu, is a beach on the southeastern shore of Oʻahu in Hawaii. It is known for its excellent bodyboarding and bodysurfing opportunities due to its peaky shore break and consistent barrels. Consequently, Sandy Beach has one of the highest incidences of water related spinal cord injuries in Hawaii, earning it the infamous nickname, "break-neck" beach. The water is especially dangerous during high surf, when powerful waves break over shallow sand and slabs of underwater lava rock. In certain conditions, strong rip currents are also present. The beach park is located between Hanauma Bay Nature Preserve to the west and Makapuʻu Point to the east along Kalanianaʻole Highway.

Due to the geography of Sandy Beach, the surf zone spanning approximately 2,500 feet contains individual surf breaks. This makes Sandy Beach somewhat unique from other shore breaks on Oahu, such as Makapuʻu Beach Park and Waiamea Bay, where the waves largely do not break in consistent locations.

From east to west, the breaks of Sandy Beach are as follows:

Full Point: Located at the eastern end of Sandy Beach Park, Full Point is an offshore reef break popular with longboarders. It offers consistent waves suitable for board surfing.

Half Point: Situated just west of Full Point, Half Point is a more dangerous offshore reef break due to waves breaking over shallow reef. It produces short, hollow tube rides and breaks both left and right; the right ends in a channel, while the left runs into the shore break.

Pipe Littles: Located just shoreward of Full Point, this break is named for its resemblance to the Banzai Pipeline, offering smaller yet powerful waves that can form hollow barrels. It's favored by bodyboarders seeking challenging conditions.

Cobbles/Pebbles: Situated west of Pipe Littles, Cobbles is characterized by the pebbles that coalesce where the wave breaks due to undercurrents. The spot is usually not as crowded as Middles due to the unpleasantness of landing directly on the pebbles. Also, Pipe Littles often merges with Cobbles which diffuses the wave quality. On the other hand, Pipe Littles often doubles up at Cobbles leading to a more powerful wave.

Middles: As the name suggests, this break lies centrally along Sandy Beach. Middles offers consistent waves that are suitable for both bodyboarding and bodysurfing, making it a popular choice for locals and visitors alike.

Gas Chambers: Located near the western end of the beach, Gas Chambers is known for its powerful, hollow waves that break close to shore. The break's name reflects the intensity of the waves, which can be hazardous even for seasoned watermen.

Last Man's: Defined not by the location of a break, but as the location of the person furthest west.

Each of these breaks has its own characteristics and challenges, contributing to Sandy Beach's reputation as a destination for wave riders seeking a variety of surf conditions.

According to the legendary waterman, Mike Stewart, Sandy Beach is the birthplace of progressive bodyboarding.

In October 2014, Honolulu City Council member Stanley Chang proposed changing the name of Sandy Beach to "President Barack Obama Sandy Beach Park." The plans were dropped due to opposition from the public.
