= Tsovet Time Instruments =

American watch manufacturer

Tsovet Limited
- Company type: Privately held company
- Industry: Watch
- Founded: 2008
- Headquarters: Newport Beach, California, United States
- Key people: David Bonaventura (Founder)
- Products: Wristwatches
- Website: www.tsovet.com

Tsovet Limited is an independent American watch brand, founded in Los Angeles in 2008 to market Asian-manufactured, American designed watches with Swiss Made movements. The company is located in Newport Beach with markets in 15 countries worldwide. Since 2012, Tsovet has collaborated with British studio Horology Design Limited and Swiss watch designer Jacques Fournier.

== Background ==
Tsovet was founded by David Bonaventura, also a musician, who'd previously co-founded Vestal (1997-2005), a company that marketed musically-inspired watches and clothing under its own brand name — as well as subsequently for other brands including Paul Frank, Vans and singer Gwen Stefani's L.A.M.B. and Harajuku Lovers.

Tsovet designs reflect an interest in metal fabrication and mechanical gauges — as well as post-Cold War Soviet watch designs, engineered industrial tools, retro motor gauges, and avionics instruments — using Italian leather and aeronautical-grade 316L stainless steel.

Tsovet was introduced in New York at its debut capsule show in July in 2008 with 4 styles in 16 color variants.
