= 2013 World Tour =

"2013 World Tour" may refer to:

In sports

- The 2013 ATP World Tour, a men's tennis circuit
- The 2013 UCI World Tour, a road cycling event
- The 2013 GSS World Tour, a bodyboarding competition
