= Gerry Lopez =

American actor

Personal information
- Born: November 7, 1948 (age 77) Honolulu, Hawaii, U.S.
- Years active: 1970–present

Surfing career
- Sport: Surfing

Surfing specifications
- Stance: Goofy
- Quiver: Long boards, guns
- Favorite waves: Pipeline
- Favorite maneuvers: Barrels

Gerry Lopez (born November 7, 1948), aka Mr. Pipeline, is an American surfer, shaper, journalist and film actor.

== Early life ==
Lopez was born in Honolulu, Hawaii, grew up in East Honolulu, Oahu, Hawaii, and attended Punahou School. He frequented the semi-secret reefs in and around Aina Haina as well as better known surf spots in Metro-Honolulu. An early reference point for his sleek and precise style was the graceful Paul Strauch, whom Lopez still credits as "the most stylish surfer ever." Lopez became the Hawaii State Champ at age 14, and he and friend Reno Abellira began surfing Ala Moana Bowls frequently. It is here that Lopez began honing his casual style and masterful tube riding skills.

== Career ==
Lopez and friends began to migrate out to Oahu's North Shore, where they watched surfers like Butch Van Artsdalen and Jock Sutherland ride the hollow waves of the Banzai Pipeline. As surfboard designs began to integrate "downrailer" edges, curve, foil, and rocker, the vertical drops and thick tubes of Pipeline became survivable. Not long after, performance levels at big Pipeline exploded, led by Lopez.

He was widely recognized as the best tuberider in the world, and won the Pipeline Masters competition in 1972 and 1973, which was pseudo-named the Gerry Lopez Pipeline Masters until the death of Andy Irons in 2010. In 1999, Lopez was selected as "Waterman of the Year" by the Surf Industries Manufacturing Association (SIMA).

Lopez played an important role in the industry of commercial surfboard manufacturing. While in Hawaii, and together with other shapers, Lopez started the Lightning Bolt Surfboards brand of high performance shortboards. Lopez created the simple but eye catching Lightning Bolt jag, which became extremely popular in the 1970s. This brand was the first one to sponsor team riders with free boards, partially because many of the riders didn't have the money to buy them.

Lopez has also worked as an actor, appearing mostly in films by fellow ex-surfer John Milius. In 1982, he played the character Subotai in the film Conan the Barbarian with Arnold Schwarzenegger. Other film appearances include Big Wednesday (1978), North Shore (1987), and Farewell to the King (1989). Lopez has also appeared in numerous surfing documentaries, including Five Summer Stories (1973), Tales From The Tube, Step Into Liquid (2003), and Riding Giants (2004). He is an ambassador for Patagonia clothing company and has written at least one essay for their catalogs. Lopez also appears frequently in ads and catalogs for Rainbow Sandals, and is a friend of the founder of the company and fellow surfer, Jay Longley.

In 2008, Lopez authored a book called Surf Is Where You Find It. He and good friend Jock Sutherland also appear on YouTube in the Patagonia sponsored "Talkin' Pipe" series, where they describe their harrowing and sometimes humorous early experiences at the Pipeline.

== Personal life ==
Since about the early 1990s, Lopez has lived in Bend, Oregon, with his wife Toni and their son, Alex. Snowboarding has become a passion for both father and son, and Gerry applied his talents as a craftsman to making snowboards. His surfboards also remain in high demand.
