= Jessica Becker =

Jessica Becker may refer to:

- Jessica Becker (bodyboarder), Brazilian bodyboarder
- Jessica Becker (footballer) (born 1999), Luxembourger footballer
