= Ben Severson =

American bodyboarder

- Born: August 29, 1964 (age 61)
- Occupation: Bodyboarder
- Known for: 1986 World Champion
- Spouse: Chris Ann Kim (1997 - present)
- Website: benseverson.com

Ben Severson is a Sandy Beach bodyboarder. He was the 1986 world bodyboarding champion.

== Biography ==
In the early 1980s, Severson had been riding the Morey Boogie Mach 7-7, the first slick-bottomed board designed by Tom Morey. In 1984 Severson began experimenting with transitional rails and changing the size of his boards as well. Morey Boogie sent him blanks that he began to customize, in particular to aid surfing in large surf at Pipeline.

By 1986 Severson was becoming recognized as a developer of innovative board designs by the industry and that year was his most successful competitively as he won both the 1986 Morey World Championship and the National Pro/Am. In 1987 Severson signed with bodyboard manufacturer BZ and he soon released his first mass-produced custom board named the BEN T-10. Despite costing US$305 it became one of the best-selling boards on the market.

In the 1990s he established Ben Severson Designs (BSD) and continues to produce custom boards.

== Teahupo'o ==
Along with fellow bodyboarder Mike Stewart, Severson pioneered surfing Teahupo'o in the late 1980s. This location has since gone on to become a premier global big-wave surfing destination on the WSL circuit.
