= Ben Player =

Australian bodyboarder

Ben Player is an Australian bodyboarder who was world champion in 2005, 2007 and 2013. His 2007 victory came after placing second (narrowly being defeated by Damian King) in the 2006 Pipeline final. He has finished #2 overall on the World Bodyboarding Tour several times. Ben now also helps run Movement Bodyboarding magazine.
