= T-Street (beach) =

Beach

- Beach
- Interactive map of T-Street
- Coordinates: 33°24′58″N 117°37′3″W
- Location: San Clemente, California

T-Street is a beach in San Clemente, California a short distance south of the town pier. It is a favored location of the local waterpeople for surfing and bodyboarding.

== Background ==
T-street is a break from a small reef at the end of the stairs that cross the railroad tracks. It got its name from Trafalgar Canyon that runs from El Camino Real nearly all the way to the water. It is located approximately 0.5 miles (0.80 km) south of the San Clemente Pier.

== See also ==
- Surfing locations in California
