= Tâmega =

Tâmega may refer to:

- Tâmega River, in Spain and Portugal
- Tâmega Subregion, Portugal
- Guilherme Tâmega, six time world bodyboarding champion
- Tamega, a Portuguese Navy destroyer
