= Bat tail =

Bodyboard design feature

In reference to bodyboard design, Bat tail is used to describe a style of tail which was invented by Mike Stewart in the mid-1990s. The bat tail is essentially a combination of the clipped crescent tail and the square tail, which provides a balance of control and maneuverability. The additional "hump" located between the two outside tail pegs increases the tail's surface area, consequently elevating the rider's legs further out of the water and as a result, this reduces drag on the wave face.

It is so named because when viewing the board bottom with the nose down, the outline of the tail somewhat resembles the ears and dome of the Batman's cowl.

This results in increased looseness and speed with a reduction in stability (as compared to a crescent tail). The bat tail is more suited to fat beach and small reef breaks where the waves are rather weak, and as such, drive must be generated by the rider.
