= Pipeline Bodysurfing Classic =

Bodysurfing competition in Oahu, Hawaii

The Pipeline Bodysurfing Classic (PBC) is a bodysurfing competition held annually during the winter season at the Banzai Pipeline on the North Shore of the island of Oahu in Hawaii.

The goals (and historical precedent) for the Pipeline Bodysurfing Classic are based on the original concept of the North Shore Expressive / Paipo bodysurfing event.

The Pipeline Bodysurfing Classic first ran in February 1971 (which preceded the Pipe Masters, which ran in December 1971). Therefore, the Pipeline Bodysurfing Classic was the first surfing event at Pipeline (Ehukai Beach Park) on the North Shore of Oahu.

The event was originally hosted by the Honolulu City Parks Department to promote water safety and wave consciousness, as a multi-division bodysurfing, handboard and skegless paipo board competition open to both men and women.

Eventually, the event was adopted by the North Shore Bodysurfing Club in Haleiwa, Hawaii.

Currently, the Pipeline Bodysurfing Classic, started in February 1971; and the Oceanside World Bodysurfing Championship, started in 1977, are the two biggest bodysurfing competitions in the world. The PBC is an event open to all bodysurfers. It is a judged competition specific to Bodysurfing and uses established judging standards.

The Pipeline Bodysurfing Classic was denied contest permits for the surf calendar seasons 2006-2007, 2008-2009, 2009–2010 (run on World Bodyboarding Championships Permit 1/2 day event), and 2010-2011 (run on IBA Bodyboarding Championships Permit 1/3 day event). Exclusive access to Pipeline and other surf breaks is a very scarce resource. The City and County of Honolulu decides which contests will receive permits. In 2010, a half day contest was held on February 24. It was won by Mike Stewart for the 12th time. Mark Cunningham who had won 6th times came in third place.

In 2011, a third of a day contest was completed on February 19, 2011. It was won by Mike Stewart for the 13th time.

Since 2011, the City and County of Honolulu Department of Parks & Recreation has only offered a permit for this event in a time frame which conflicts another event.

During 2016 the North Shore Bodysurfing Club attempted mediation with other event applicants to allow the Pipeline Bodysurfing Classic to co-exist on the 2017-2018 North Shore surf events calendar. The outcome was a contested case hearing set for October 2017 to determine a January 4 2018 event. The North Shore Bodysurfing Club had submitted a request for mayor action through the Mayor's information officer to resolve the scheduling conflict. In the end the City and County of Honolulu Department of Parks & Recreation would not allow the information officer to attempt a resolution. This prevented the opportunity for both the Pipeline Bodysurfing Classic (one day event) and World Bodyboarding Championship (two day event) to be included on the 2017-2018 North Shore surf events calendar.
