= Hugo Pinheiro =

Portuguese bodyboarder

Hugo Pinheiro is a Portuguese bodyboarder. He placed second at the ISA World Surfing Games in 2006.
