= Amaury Lavernhe =

French bodyboarder

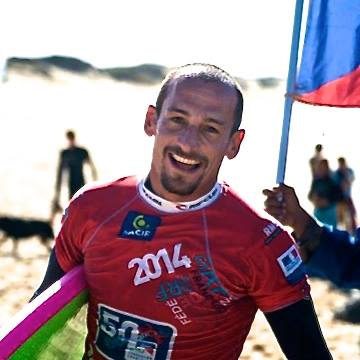
Amaury Lavernhe Double Bodyboard World Champion

Amaury Lavernhe is a French bodyboarder born in 1985 in Poitiers. He has won the World Tour twice, in 2010 and 2014.
