= Glenda Kozlowski =

Brazilian journalist, sports reporter and presenter

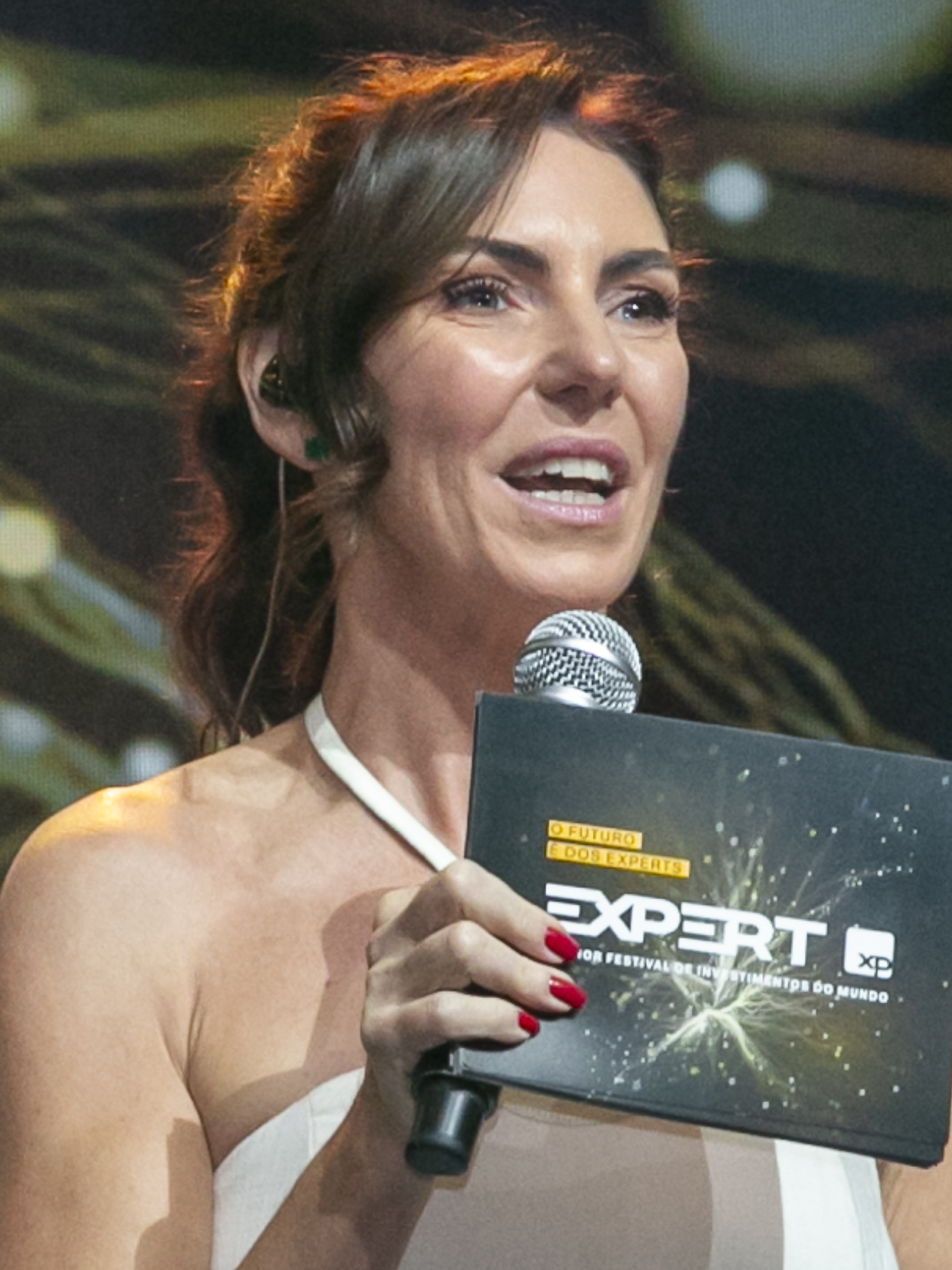
- Kozlowski in 2023
- Born: Glenda Gonçalves dos Reis Kozlowski; 9 July 1974 (age 52); Rio de Janeiro, Brazil
- Occupation: Journalist
- Spouses: Cassiano Leal (m. 2001; div. 2008) Luís Tepedino (m. 2017; div. 2021)
- Children: 2

Glenda Gonçalves dos Reis Kozlowski (born 9 July 1974) is a Brazilian journalist, television presenter and former bodyboarder. She is best known as host of Esporte Espetacular and Globo Esporte. She currently co-hosts Show do Esporte on Rede Bandeirantes.

== Early life ==
Glenda Kozlowski was born on 9 July 1974 in Rio de Janeiro to an English father and a Brazilian mother. Her paternal grandfather was Polish. Her passion for sports began during childhood, with the encouragement of her father. Her father had refused to buy her a bodyboard, and a friend of her father's went to the first store and purchased a 7.7 boogie board. She placed second at her first contest. At that time, she also practiced judo, volleyball and tennis. Aged 10, she started surfing at the beach of Barra, in Rio. Shortly thereafter, she attended the championships brand.

== Career ==
In 1989, Kozlowski won her first International title at the amateur bodyboarding championship at Sandy Beach. As a professional athlete, she achieved her first Professional World Title by winning the World Championships at Pipeline in 1991 and won five Brazilian National titles. She also won two National USA contests and three Australian events open to International riders

=== Journalism ===
Kozlowski began her journalism career in 1992, invited by the journalist Gilberto Conde to present the program 360, from the channel Top Sport - which later became Sportv. In the program, interviewed the Brazilian men's volleyball team, which had just won the gold medal at the 1992 Barcelona Summer Olympics, soccer player Zico, among others.

Kozlowski came to Rede Globo in 1996 to host the show Esporte Espetacular alongside reporter Clayton Conservani. She made several special reports for the station's sports programs, among them, practicing surfing on a river in Amapá and live bungee jumping. Participated in his first international coverage by Globo in the 2000 Sydney Summer Olympics. In 2001, she returned to the Esporte Espetacular presentation, this time beside the reporter Tino Marcos.

In 2003, Kozlowski began to display the local Globo Esporte block in São Paulo. In 2009, she led for the first time, along with Cléber Machado, the transmission of the parades of the samba schools of the panel of Rio de Janeiro. In 2010, she will be the main host of the second season the Brazilian stunt/dare reality television show Hipertensão, which is scheduled to premiere September, 2010.

In 2013, Kozlowski was the post-race interviewer at the Formula One 2013 Brazilian Grand Prix, interviewing Sebastian Vettel, Mark Webber and Fernando Alonso on the podium. It was Webber's last Formula 1 grand prix before retirement.
