= Butch Van Artsdalen =

American surfer

Butch Van Artsdalen

Charles M. Van Artsdalen (January 31, 1941 – July 18, 1979) was a surfer. He moved to La Jolla, California, from his birthplace of Norfolk, Virginia, at age 14. Van Artsdalen is best known as a pioneer of surfing 25-foot waves at such North Shore locations as Waimea Bay and Sunset Beach; and tube riding in Hawaii during the early 1960-1970s. A member of the Duke Kahanamoku Surf Team, he appeared in several surf movies and remained a fixture of the international surfing community until his death from alcohol-related illness in 1979.

Van Artsdalen's athletic prowess was first noted in the years he attended La Jolla High School where he earned varsity letter in baseball, basketball, and football. He began surfing at the age of fourteen, and chose to continue in the sport because of its unstructured freedom when compared to the discipline of conventional professional sports. While in La Jolla, Van Artsdalen became part of a well-known surfing group at Windansea Beach. He moved to Hawaii after graduating from high school to begin his professional career.

The challenging waves of Oahu's North Shore soon became Van Artsdalen's home. He was among the first to master the powerful, hollow waves at Ehukai Beach known as the Banzai Pipeline. This, along with his reputation for riding switchfoot in the large surf at Waimea Bay, earned him the nickname "Mr. Pipeline."

Because of his talents, Van Artsdalen was featured in several early surf films by Dale Davis and Bruce Brown, the most notable of which was The Endless Summer. Van Artsdalen received onscreen credit in one of William Asher's "surfploitation" comedies, Muscle Beach Party, starring Frankie Avalon and Annette Funicello. He was recruited by artist and talent scout Michael Dormer to American International Pictures for auditions, but a violent temper precluded a film career.

In 1964, Van Artsdalen was ranked among the world's best surfers by the Surfer Magazine Surfer Poll. A year later he was invited to join the Duke Kahanamoku Surf Team, becoming a global ambassador for wave riding and making appearances at shopping centers and promotional events.

As surfing evolved during the late 1960s from heavier, more cumbersome longboards to lighter, shorter boards, Van Artsdalen's reputation was gradually eclipsed by a new generation of tube riders such as Gerry Lopez and Rory Russell. Still, he remained at Banzai Pipeline, working as a lifeguard in his later years. In 1969 Van Artsdalen won the 34th Annual Stone Steps Invitational Surf Contest at Stone Steps in Leucadia, California. Surfing had grown in popularity by that point, and Van Artsdalen felt the purity of the sport was being spoiled by posers. He frequently succumbed to binge drinking, and died of alcohol-related causes in 1979 at age 38. The only family authenticated Butch Van Artsdalen surfboard made since Butch’s passing is made by Bill Shrosbree.
