= International Bodyboarding Committee =

International sport governing body

- Region served: Worldwide

The International Bodyboarding Committee (IBC) is the governing body for professional Bodyboarders and was dedicated to showcasing the world's best talent in a variety of progressive formats.

IBA ran the bodyboarding World Tour from 2003 - 2013.

In 2020, the International Bodyboarding Corporation was created in order to run the bodyboarding world tour. For the period of 2020 to 2021, the IBC couldn't effectively run a tour due to the COVID-19 pandemic which impacted global travel. The IBC Bodyboarding World Tour consists of 6 divisions: Men, Women, Dropknee, Junior Men, Junior Women and Master Women.

== History ==
2003 - 2013

== See also ==
- Surfing Australia
- World Tour (bodyboarding)
