= Rainbow Sandals =

American footwear company

- Industry: Retail
- Founded: 1974
- Founder: Jay "Sparky" Longley
- Headquarters: San Clemente, California, United States
- Products: Sandals
- Website: www.rainbowsandals.com

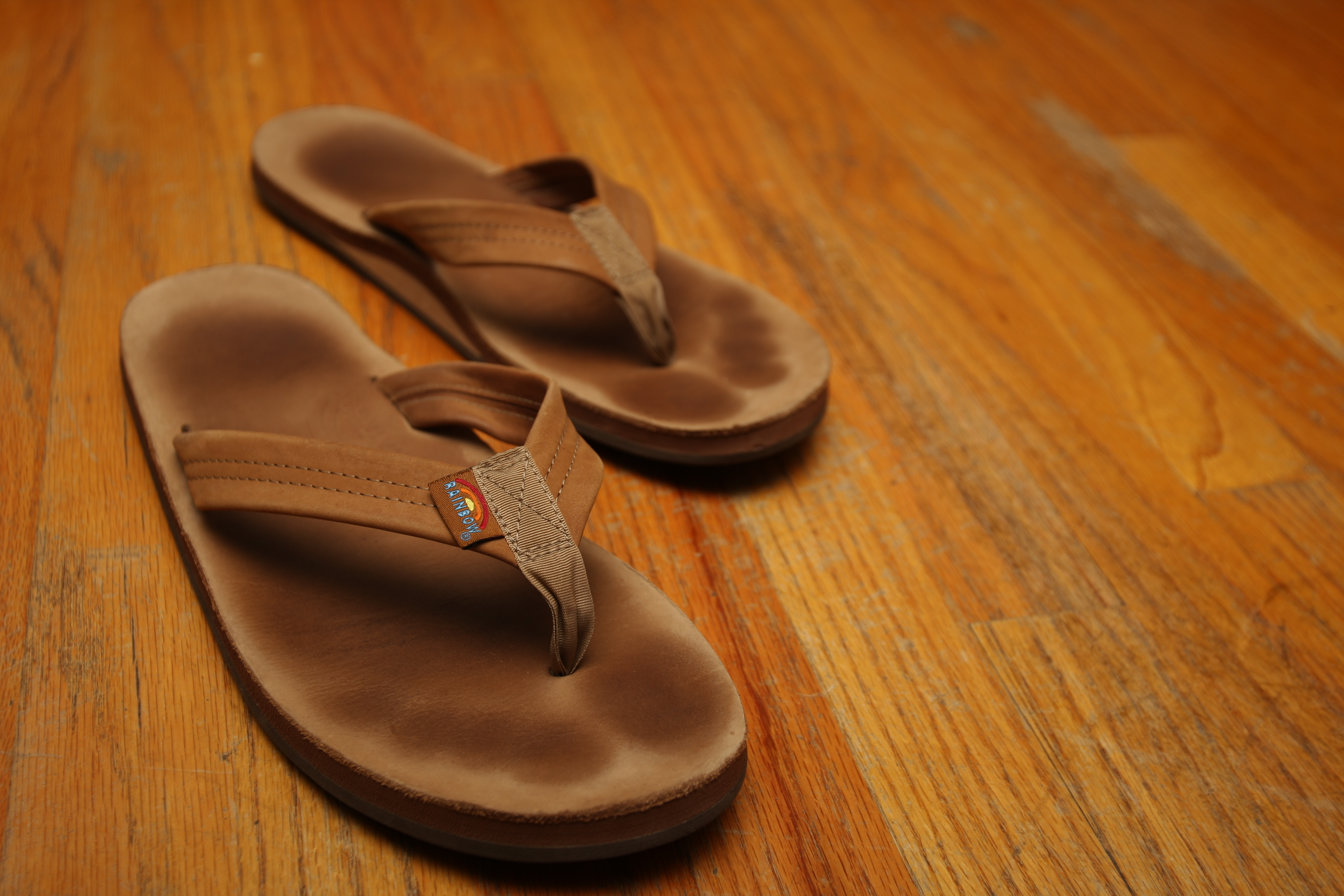
A pair of Rainbow flip flops demonstrating how they conform to the wearer's feet.

Rainbow Sandals Inc. was established in 1974 in Laguna Beach, California, by Jay Longley and is currently based in San Clemente, California. The company specializes in men's and women's leather, hemp, and rubber flip-flops.

When Longley first started making sandals, he was assembling 15 pairs per day out of leather and Malaysian rubber in the garage of his Laguna Beach home. Longley relocated to San Clemente in 1974 and began manufacturing 1,200 pairs of sandals a day. Since 2002, 75% of the production was moved to China because of a solvent in the glue he uses. Longley had to install a catalytic oxidizer at his San Clemente factory that scrubs all the volatile organic compounds out of the glue before they are emitted into the air. Longley is legally permitted to make only 1,000 pairs per day in San Clemente. In China, they use a glue without volatile organic compounds. However, Longley cannot use this glue in California because it is too combustible under the fire code.
