= Sari Ohhara =

Japanese bodyboarder

Sari Ohhara (大原 沙莉, Ōhara Sari; born 21 April 1995) is a Japanese bodyboarder from Ichinomiya, Japan. She is the third ranked top female bodyboarder in the world. She won first place in the 2015 APB Tahara Pro in Japan, her first win in the APB World Tour. She won the 2019 World Title after competing in the Gran Canaria Fronton King Pro 2019.

She first bodyboarded at the age of 11 and joined the World Tour in 2011.
