= Jessica Becker (bodyboarder) =

Brazilian bodyboarder

- Occupation: Bodyboarder

Jessica Becker is the fourth ranked top female bodyboarder in the world. The Brazilian bodyboarder won the Wood Bodyboard Champion Girls Experience European tour in 2015.
