= Alexandra Rinder =

Spanish bodyboarder (born 1998)

Alexandra Rinder is a professional Bodyboarder and two time APB World Bodyboarding Champion. She is also the youngest world champion in the history of bodyboarding.

== Early life ==
Rinder was born in Las Palmas de Gran Canaria, Canary Islands, Spain in 1998. Her father is Austrian and her mother is German. The Canary Islands resident has been living in Las Palmas de Gran Canaria her whole life, and began bodyboarding at the age of 9. She has been competing professionally since the age of 12.

== Recognition ==
Rinder won the 2015 APB Women's World Bodyboarding Tour title at the Nazaré Pro, in Praia do Norte, Portugal.
