= Tube riding =

Surfing term

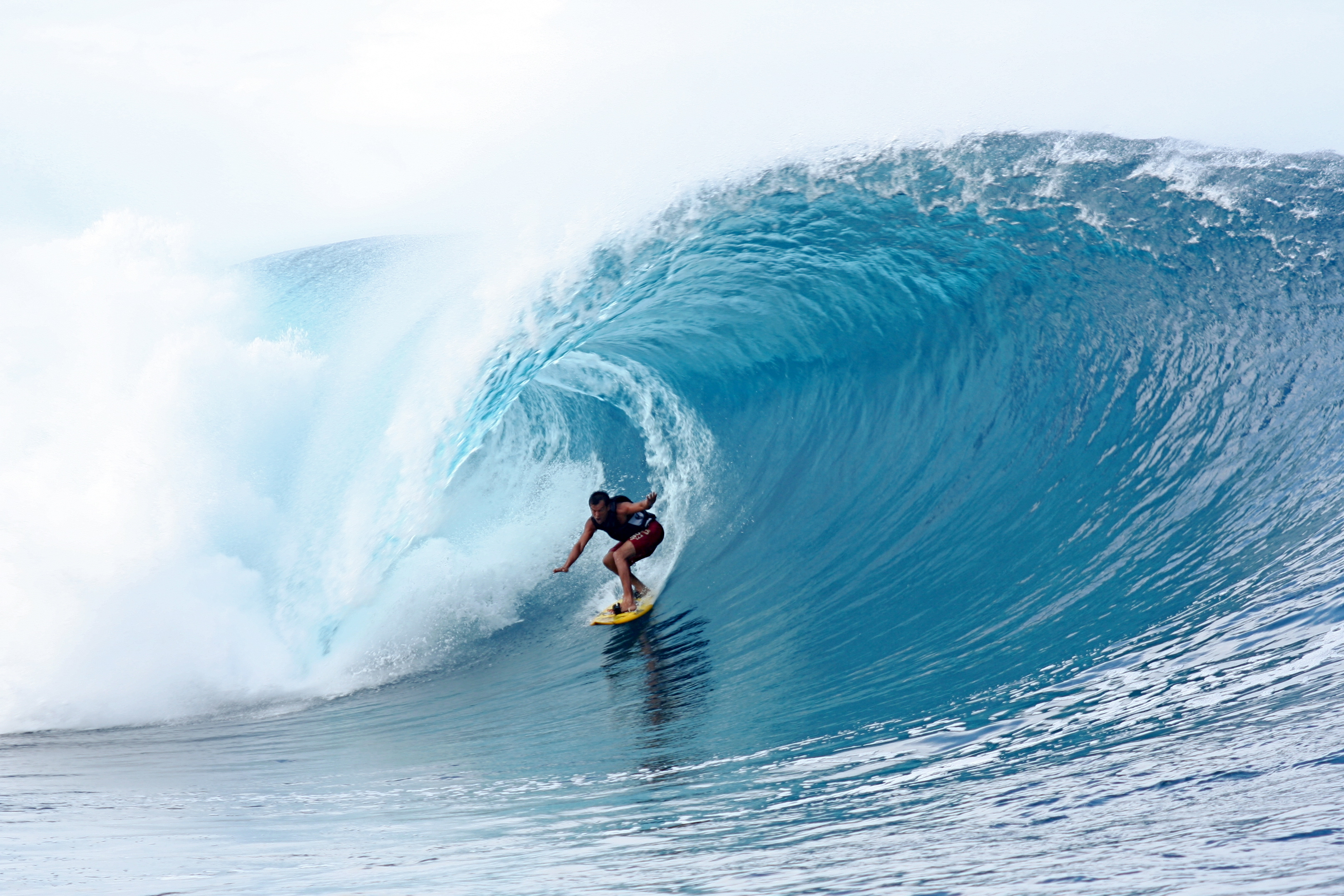
Tube riding at Teahupo'o (Tahiti)

Tube riding is a term used by surfers to describe riding well inside the curve or barrel of a finely-shaped breaking wave. Under the right conditions, waves in some areas, such as the Banzai Pipeline in Hawaii, form a moving "tube" or cylinder as they break.

The most straightforward way to tube ride is by body surfing. By riding the waves on their belly without a board, a body surfer may access the tube with relative ease, even in the case of a moderately small barreling wave. It is also possible to tube ride using a boogie board, surfboard, body surfing hand boards, or other wave riding implement. However, tube riding is an advanced skill and some surfers spend years (or even their entire lives) surfing without ever really getting "tubed" — the term for being inside the barrel of the wave.
