= Jeff Hubbard =

American bodyboarder

Jeff Hubbard is the 2012 IBA World Tour bodyboarder champion from Kauaʻi, Hawaii. His brother David also won a bodyboarding world title: the 2009 IBA Drop Knee World Tour. Jeff won his first IBA World Title in 2006 and the second in 2009 and third in 2012.

His style is characterized by aerial tricks, and recognized by constantly pushing the boundaries of the sport. His split leg invert and looped 360 airs are a kind of trademark, and he is also regarded as one of the few bodyboarders to ever land an aerial 720. He is a five-time winner of the IBA Pipeline Pro bodyboarding contest in 2002, 2006, 2011, 2012 and 2017.

Jeff Now owns his own bodyboard brand with his brother dave called Hubboards. www.hubboards.com Jeff also has his own swim fins called Air Hubb swim fins.

Three-time IBA World Champion (2006, 2009, 2012) Five -time IBA Pipeline Champion (2003, 2007,2011,2012,2017) Eleven-time United States National Title Holder (8 professional and 3 amateur) Sintra Portugal Pro Champion 2009 Peruvian Inka Challenge Champion 2009 Canary Islands El Fronton Wild Wild Wave Champion 2010 Mexico Zicatela Pro Champion 2011, 2012/td> Encanto Pro Champion 2012 Port Macquarie festival of Bodyboarding Champion 2012

Hubbard won the "El Fronton - The Wild Wild Wave Invitational 2010" and the "IBA Pipeline Pro 2011" reaching his third Pipe Title. With the last two high scoring waves (9.75 and 9.5 out of 10) in the last 5 minutes of the final, he dramatically jumped to the top spot after being fourth (and last) for most of the heat.
