= Tom Morey =

American surfer and musician (1935–2021)

Tom Hugh Morey (15 August 1935 – 14 October 2021), also known by the moniker Y, was a musician, engineer, surfboard shaper, and surfer responsible for several technological innovations that have heavily influenced modern developments in surfing equipment design.

== Biography ==
Morey was born in Detroit, Michigan in 1935. By 1944, he was living in Laguna Beach, California, and was avidly developing his talent for drumming. He became a professional musician in the 1950s. He was an avid performer of jazz. While surfing as a hobby he attended the University of Southern California and graduated with a B.A. in mathematics in 1957. He married Jolly Givens in 1958 and worked for Douglas Aircraft, as a process engineer in composites. After Douglas, he worked a series of jobs involving composite materials and processes, which he applied to his surf-related inventions. He left the corporate world for good in 1964, moved to Ventura and started a series of companies that served the surfing market. Morey also sponsored surfing competitions such as The Tom Morey Invitational. Morey's marriage produced two daughters before ending in divorce in the late 1960s.

Morey was an adherent of the Baháʼí Faith from 1970 after he came across a 'unity feast' at a Kauai beach, where "whites, blacks and Hawaiians, mixed cordially". "After a couple of months of attending informal meetings on Baháʼí teachings - I realized this was something very important not to toy with; rather to become immersed in." "I withdrew immediately from alcohol, drugs and sexual promiscuity." Morey attributed inspiration for invention of the Boogie board (on 7 July 1971) to a particular Baha'i prayer he kept coming across which included the passage "confer upon me thoughts which may change this world into a rose garden." He founded the company Morey Boogie shortly thereafter. Morey later married Marchia Nichols, and they had four children.

Morey sold Morey Boogie in 1977 and lived in Hawaii for a decade, working as a consultant by day, jazz musician by night. By 1977, he was producing 80,000 bodyboards per year. In 1985, the Moreys moved to Bainbridge Island, Washington, where Morey worked as an engineer for the Boeing Corporation. In 1992 he returned to southern California where he reentered the surf scene, consulting on the Wham-O Boogie®Board and with the new company Morey Bodyboards. Morey ended consulting in January 1999 founding his own company again - TomMorey.com - and changed his name to Y.

From 1999 to 2007, Morey focused on developing new, soft-surfboard technology. He handmade these boards in a small workshop in Carlsbad, California. His most famous of these was the Swizzle, a parabolic-shaped longboard design. Morey marketed and sold the boards under the name Surfboards by Y.

Morey died on 14 October 2021 at the age of 86.

== Surfing ==
In 1946, at the age of 11, Morey came in second in the Green Valley Lake Paddle board Championships. He began board surfing in 1952. In April 1955 he wake-surfed (no towrope) behind an ocean-going yacht.

From 1955 to 1963, Morey was a sponsored surfer for Dave Godart Surfboards, then Dave Sweet, Con, Velzy Jacobs, and finally Dewey Weber. In 1964 he began setting up businesses providing surf boards and inventing technologies for surf boards:

- 1954 - created the first "concave nose pocket"
- 1955 - invented something he called the "Wing Tip," a Coaund Lift nose.
- 1964 - created the first polypropylene fin and first commercial interchangeable fin system.
- 1965 - used resin-impregnated corrigated cardboard to make a "paper surfboard" for which there was a television commercial and an August 1966, full color, two page advertisement in Reader's Digest.
- 1965 - created the Tom Morey Invitational Nose Riding Championships, first professional surfing contest held at Ventura Point.
- 1971 - invented the bodyboard, called in those days a Boogie Board after Morey's love of music.
- 1974–1976 - engineered the essence of today's "soft board" manufacturing technology.

Morey left commercial surfboarding interests in the late 1970s and returned to them in the 1990s.
