= Andre Botha (bodyboarder) =

South African bodyboarder

Personal information
- Nationality: South African
- Born: 1980 (age 44–45) Cape Town, South Africa

Sport
- Country: South Africa
- Sport: Bodyboarding

Andre Botha is a South African bodyboarder. Born in Cape Town in 1981, he left school at the age of 15 to become a professional bodyboarder and won his first world title at the age of 17 and his second at 18, winning both the World GOB Tour Series and the Pipeline World Championships.

Botha was also the first South African to win the Morey Banzai Pipe Championships and the last champion of this 17-year-old event. He is the first South African bodyboarder to win the GOB (Global Organization of Bodyboarding) world title. The second person ever to win both the Pipe and GOB titles in one year. The following year he proved this was no fluke by winning the first ever Mike Stewart Pipeline Pro.

On 8 December 2015 Botha was the first responder to come to the aid of Evan Geiselman after a serious wipe out at Pipeline in treacherous conditions
