= Damian King =

Australian bodyboarder

Damian King is an Australian professional bodyboarder. He was World Bodyboarding Champion twice, in 2003 and 2004. In 2011 he won the Dropknee World Tour becoming the first bodyboarder in history to win both prone and dropknee world titles.

== Biography ==
King grew up in Port Macquarie, New South Wales, which is world-renowned in bodyboarding culture for the level of talent and number of bodyboarders it has produced. The first Australian bodyboarding world champion, Michael Eppelstun, also came from Port Macquarie. The city was officially recognised in 2010 as the "Bodyboarding Capital of Australia" and it is claimed by the Port Macquarie Bodyboarding Association to be the "Bodyboarding Capital of the World".

King cited the death of his mother as motivation for winning his first World Championship in 2003.

== Professional career ==
- 2003 IBA World Champion
- 2004 IBA World Champion
- 2011 IBA Dropknee World Champion

== Filmography ==
- The Joker (2004)
- The Joker 2 (2008)

== Product endorsement ==
As of 2013, King is now a team rider for Found Boards, an Australian-based bodyboarding company owned by professional bodyboarder and entrepreneur Mitchell Rawlins. He is also a team rider for Unite Clothing Company, an Australian surfwear company.
