= Bodysurfing =

Riding a wave without the assistance of any buoyant device

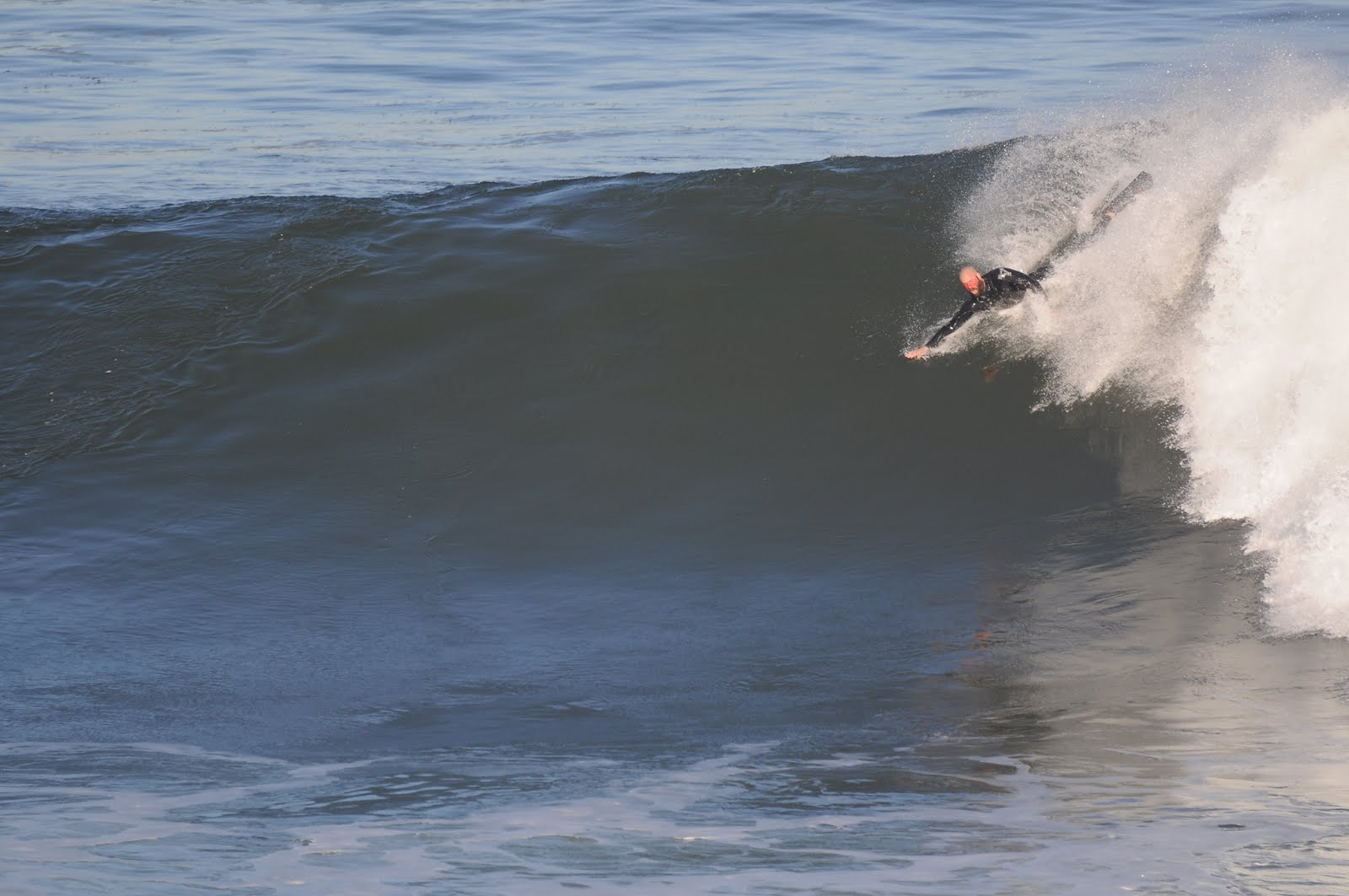
Thomas VanMelum navigates a glassy right

Bodysurfing is the sport of riding a wave without the assistance of any buoyant device such as a surfboard or bodyboard. Bodysurfers often equip themselves with a pair of swimfins that aid propulsion and help the bodysurfer catch, ride, and kick out of waves. Some bodysurfers also use a wooden or foam handplane, which helps to get one's chest out of the water to reduce drag; this is known as handplaning and is an offshoot of bodysurfing.

Some of the best waves for bodysurfing are steep, fast, tubing beachbreak waves that are often unsuitable for boardsurfing; two of the best known are Sandy Beach and Makapuu on the east shore of Oahu in Hawaii. The Wedge, in Newport Beach, California, a ferocious sand-pounding peak wave aptly described by Sports Illustrated in 1971 as "a great big screaming shorebreak," has for decades been bodysurfing's most fearsome and famous break. Other regions with world-class bodysurfing waves include Hossegor (France), Puerto Escondido (Mexico), and Nazaré (Portugal).

Some bodysurfers include Buffalo Keaulana and Sean Enoka of Hawaii; Californians Bud Browne, Candy Calhoun, Larry Lunbeck, and Mickey Muñoz; Wedge riders Fred Simpson, Terry Wade, Kevin 'Mel' Thoman and Thomas VanMelum; and Australians Don McCredie, Tony Hubbard, Max Watt, and Michael Fay. Hawaiian lifeguard Mark Cunningham, a bodysurfer at the board-dominated Pipeline, was regarded as the world's premier bodysurfer from the mid-1970s to the early '90s; nine-time bodyboarding world champion Mike Stewart then become the sport's dominant presence, and was the first to do a barrel roll at Pipeline.

== History ==
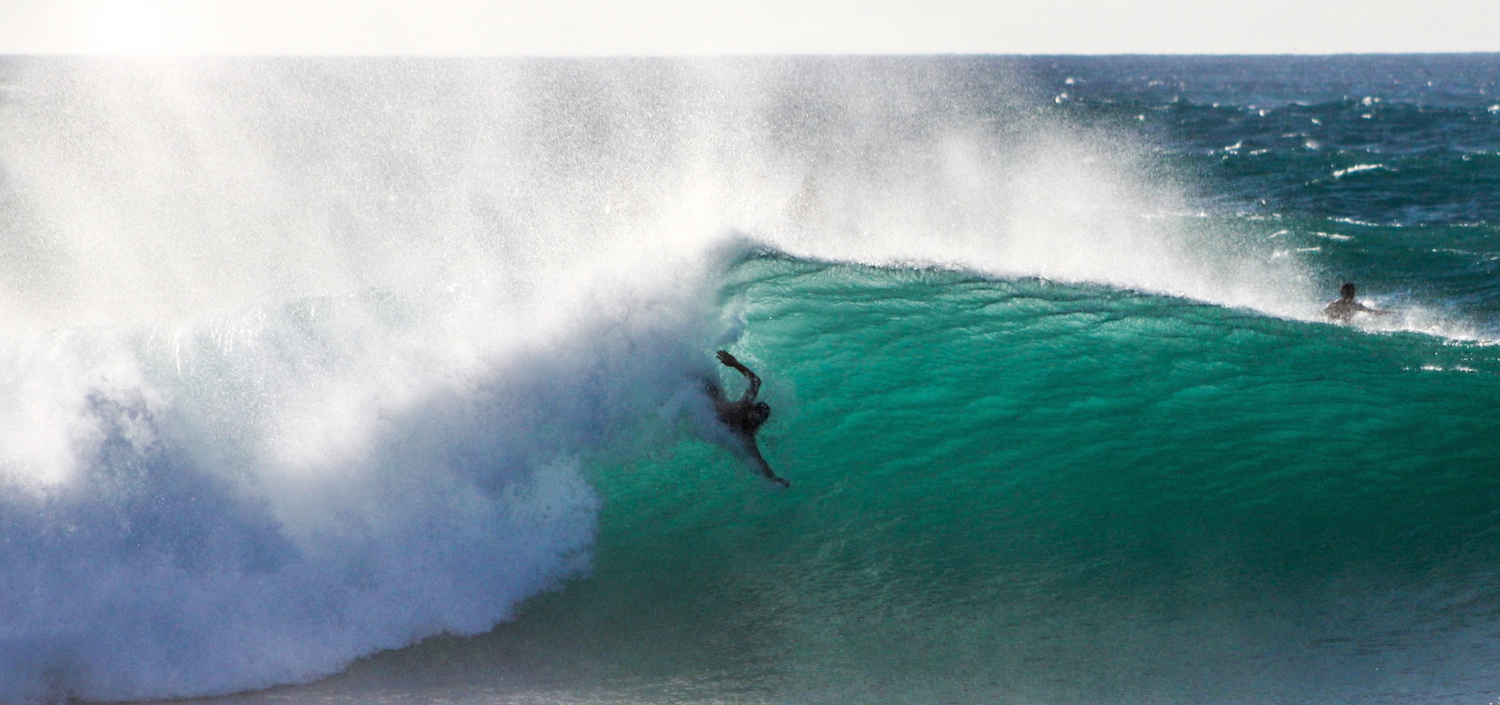
Travis Overley bodysurfing at Banzai Pipeline. Shot by Rachel Newton

Bodysurfing predates board-surfing, which itself, University of Hawaii anthropologist Ben Finney suggests, may date as far back as 2000 B.C. Recorded bodysurfing history, however, begins after that of board-surfing. In 1899, Australian Fred Williams was taught to bodysurf by Tommy Tanna, a Polynesian islander brought to Sydney to work as a gardener; Williams in turn taught local "surf-bathers" how to ride waves.

Bodysurfing was first popularized in the United States during the mid-1920s by Olympic swimmer Wally O'Conner of Los Angeles, who visited local beaches and drew audiences by diving underwater while facing an incoming wave, doing a push-turn off the sand, then bursting out of the shore-bound white water. (USC football player Marion Morrison, an early California bodysurfer, tore ligaments in his shoulder while riding the surf near Balboa Pier in 1926; finished with organized sports, Morrison made his way to Hollywood and was renamed John Wayne).

In 1931, Los Angeles bodysurfer Ron Drummond published The Art of Wave-Riding, a 26-page primer on bodysurfing basics, and the first book of any kind on surfing. California surfer Owen Churchill visited Hawaii the following year and noticed that locals were able to increase the power of their kick stroke—and therefore catch waves easier—after fixing palm fronds to their feet with tar. Churchill kept the idea in the back of his mind, and in 1940 introduced what would become a bodysurfing equipment standard: the Churchill "Duck Feet" swim fin. In another breakthrough, around the same time, Santa Monica lifeguard Cal Porter taught himself how to ride at an angle across the wave face rather than straight to the beach.

Tens of thousands of coast-dwelling Americans had by that time taken to waves. A bodysurfing article published in 1940 by Life magazine, "Surf-Riding is a Favorite Summertime Sport," noted that "almost every boy and girl [in California] is an expert surf-rider." Board-surfing, mat-riding, and bodyboarding would all become popular in the years and decades to come — and gain far more attention — but bodysurfing, practiced mostly by tourists and day visitors during the warmer months, has always remained the most popular form of wave-riding.

== Contests ==
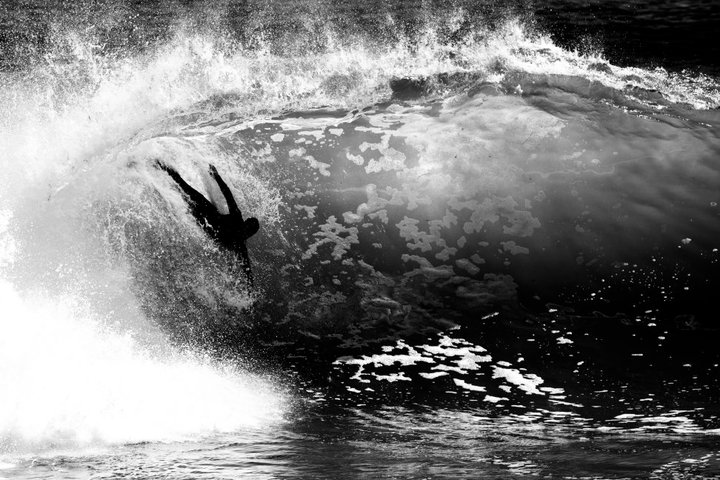
Tim Burnham rides the Wedge in Newport Beach, CA

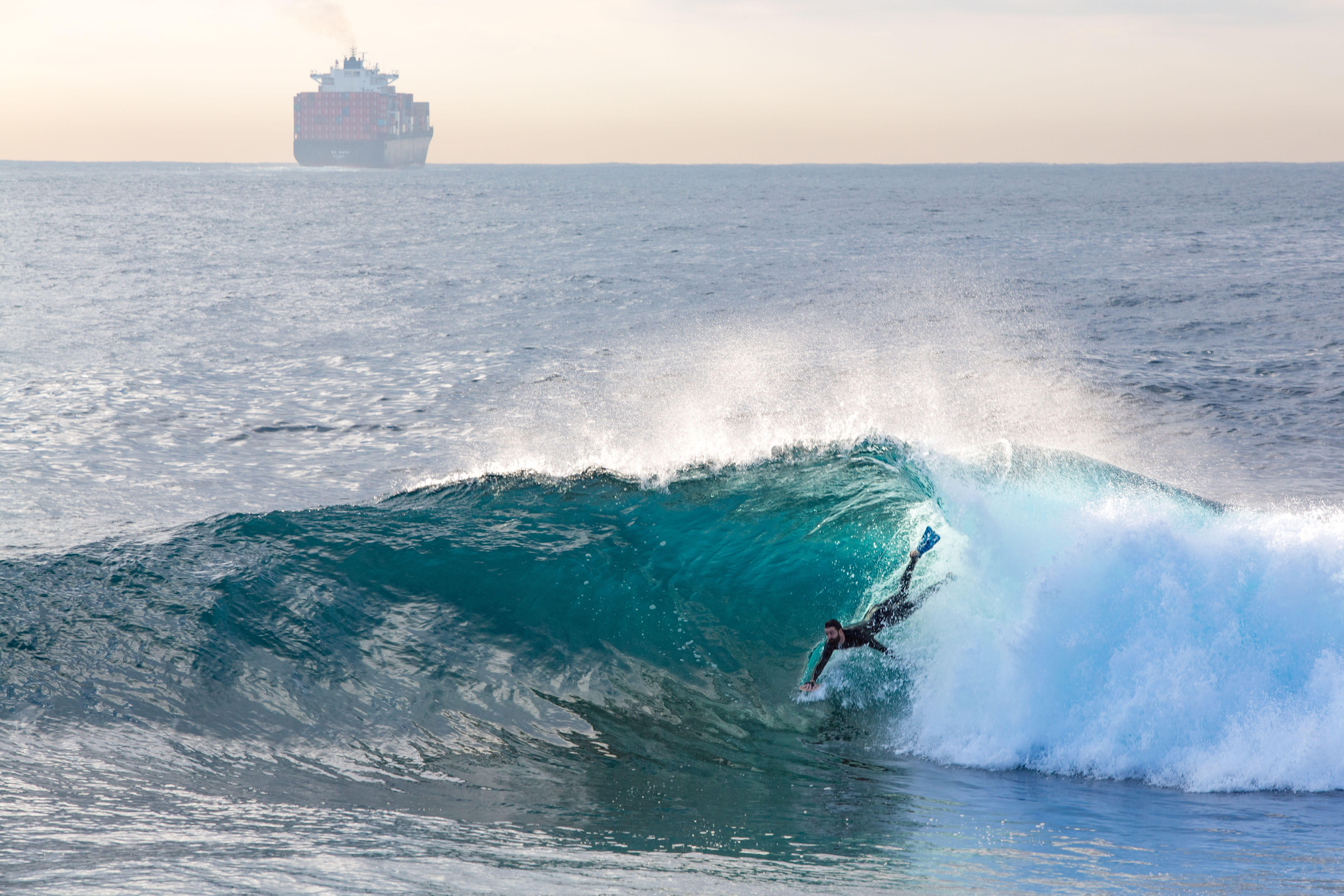
Rikki Gilbey bodysurfing at Cape Solander, Sydney with a handplane and bodysurfing fins

Bodysurfing has no organized contest circuits or leagues, or a definitive world championship. A limited number of individual contests, however, have long been attended by a small international cadre of full-time bodysurfers. Two of the biggest events, both founded in 1977, are the Oceanside World Bodysurfing Championship, held in midsummer, and the Pipeline Bodysurfing Classic, usually held in January. The Pipeline Classic, long regarded as the sport's most prestigious contest, became the first professional bodysurfing contest in 1980, but soon returned to amateur status after organizers were unable to find sponsors.

The Pipeline Bodysurfing Classic competition runs at the Banzai Pipeline. The Pipeline Bodysurfing Classic first ran in February 1971. More recent team bodysurfing events include the Australian Bodysurfing Classic held in Sydney, Australia.

== Hazards ==
Bodysurfing produces frequent spinal injuries and fatalities, as practitioners ride head-first, often in plunging near-shore waves breaking into shallow water.

== In popular culture ==
Included among the small number of bodysurfing video titles are Primal Surf (2000), Pure Blue (2001), and Come Hell or High Water (2011). Bodysurfing has also been featured in more than a dozen surf movies and videos, including Barefoot Adventure (1960), Gun Ho! (1963), The Endless Summer (1966), Going Surfin' (1973), and We Got Surf (1981). The Art of Bodysurfing, a paperback book offering both history and instruction, was published in 1972.

== See also ==
- Bodyboarding
- Surfing
