= Vestal Watches =

Vestal International, Inc.
- Founded: 1997
- Headquarters: Costa Mesa, California, United States
- Key people: Johnny Gehris (President)
- Products: Wristwatches, accessories, clothing, sunglasses
- Website: vestalwatch.com

Vestal was an independent company that marketed watches predicated on image and style, manufactured in Asia.

Vestal sold watches and clothing under its own name and for other brands.

Believed to be out of business as of 2020 according to the BBB (Better Business Bureau).

== History ==
On September 23, 2002, Vestal officially registered the "Vestal" word mark. In 2004, Vestal opened an international headquarters in Biarritz, France. That same year, Vestal Group, Inc. was incorporated to make watches for other brands, including Paul Frank, Vans and singer Gwen Stefani's Lamb and Harajuku Lovers.

On August 22, 2008, Vestal International, Inc. was incorporated. On August 31, 2008, Vestal Watch, Inc.'s assets were sold to Vestal International, Inc. Vestal International, Inc. is owned and operated by Johnny Gehris.

In 2010, Vestal launched Vestal Vision, a line of eyewear. Vestal also released a Radio iPhone Application called Vestal Radio. This free application streams VestalRadio.com live to your iPhone, iPad or iPod Touch, broadcasting the latest music from Vestal Featured Artists as well as other bands, musicians and DJ’s from around the world. Also airing on Vestal Radio are exclusive interviews, Guest DJ sets & Mixtape shows. Vestal were featured as one of the available clothing brands in the EA Black Box video game Skate 3.

== Celebrity endorsements ==
Vestal endorses musicians Peaches, Blacklips, Valient Thorr, Warpaint, Amanda Blank, MSTRKRFT, and Shiny Toy Guns.

Jared Champion, drummer for Cage The Elephant wears Vestal watches. Carlos Dengler, former bassist for Interpol and Velvet Revolver bassist Duff McKagan, formerly of Guns N' Roses also wear Vestal watches, along with Juliette Lewis and her band Juliette & The Licks, as well as musicians from bands such as the Eagles of Death Metal and Shiny Toy Guns. In 2007, the Canadian singer-songwriter Peaches posed as a model for a Vestal advertisement, which was featured in The Fader magazine.

== Awards ==
In 2007 Vestal won the Breakthrough Brand of the Year award by the Surf Industry Manufacturers Association. In 2008, Vestal was nominated for "Men’s Marketing Campaign of the Year".
