= Banzai Pipeline =

Surf reef break in Hawaii, United States

Coordinates: 21.664°N 158.054°W

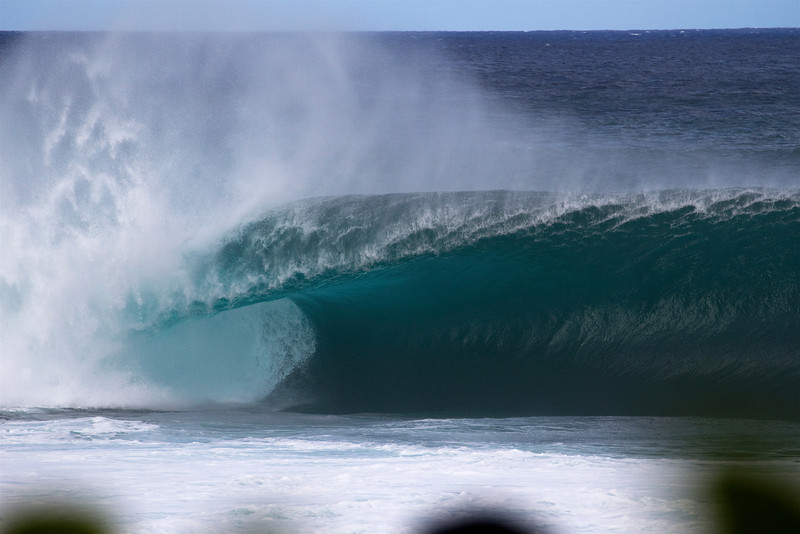
Empty wave at Banzai Pipeline

The Banzai Pipeline, or simply Pipeline or Pipe, is a surf reef break located in Hawaii, off Ehukai Beach Park in Pupukea on O'ahu's North Shore. A reef break is an area in the ocean where waves start to break once they reach the shallows of a reef. Pipeline is known for huge waves that break in shallow water just above a sharp and cavernous reef, forming large, hollow, thick curls of water that surfers can tube ride. There are three reefs at Pipeline in progressively deeper water farther out to sea that activate according to the increasing size of approaching ocean swells.

== Origin of the name ==
The location's compound name combines the name of the surf break (Pipeline) with the name of the beach fronting it (Banzai Beach). It got its name in December 1961, when surfing movie producer Bruce Brown was driving up north with Californians Phil Edwards and Mike Diffenderfer. Brown stopped at the site to film Edwards catching several waves. At the time, there was a construction project on an underground pipeline by the adjacent Kamehameha Highway, and Diffenderfer made the suggestion to name the break Pipeline. The name was first used in Bruce Brown's movie Surfing Hollow Days. It also lent its name to the 1963 hit song "Pipeline" by surf music rockers The Chantays.

== Specifics of the break ==
The reef at Pipe is a flat tabletop reef, with several caverns on the inside, creating a giant air bubble that pops on the front of the wave when the wave lurches upwards just before breaking. There are also several jagged, underwater lava spires that can injure fallen surfers. When sand accumulates on the reef at Pipeline, the waves can become unpredictable and violently "close out," (break all at once instead of peeling in a way that allows a surfer to ride the wave). A strong swell (a formation of long-wavelength surface waves) from the west clears out the sand in the reef, and after that, a strong north swell can give rise to the best waves.

There are four waves associated with Pipeline. The left (which means the wave breaks from left to right from the perspective of a watcher on shore) known as Pipeline (a.k.a. First Reef) is the most commonly surfed and photographed. When the reef is hit by a north swell, the peak (the highest tipping-point of the wave where it begins to curl) becomes an A-frame shaped wave, with Pipe closing out a bit and peeling off left, and the equally famous Backdoor Pipeline peeling away to the right at the same time. As the size at Pipe increases, over 12 feet usually, Second Reef on the outside (further out into the deeper ocean waters) starts breaking, with longer walls (the unbroken face of the wave that the surfer slides across), and more size. At an extreme size, an area called Third Reef even further outside starts to break with giant waves.

== Surfers ==
Numerous surfers and photographers have been killed at Pipeline, including Jon Mozo and Tahitian Malik Joyeux, who was famous for his heavy charging (gutsy surfing) at Teahupo'o. Pipeline has been called one of the world's deadliest waves. Its average wave is 9 feet (3 m), but it can be as tall as 20 feet. Especially perilous are sections of shallow reef known as "Off the Wall" and "Backdoor".

A few of the notable surfers at Pipeline are Phil Edwards (who is credited as the first person to surf it), Greg Noll (first to surf Second/Third Reef in 1964), Joyce Hoffman (first woman to surf it), Butch Van Artsdalen, Gerry Lopez, Mike Stewart, Shaun Tomson, Mark Richards, Wayne 'Rabbit' Bartholomew, Peter Townend, Michael Ho, Simon Anderson, Tom Carroll, Sunny Garcia, Kelly Slater, Danny Fuller, Jamie O'Brien, Rob Machado, Andy Irons, Mick Fanning, Gabriel Medina, Italo Ferreira and John John Florence. Moana Jones Wong has earned the nickname "Queen of Pipeline." In 1964, John Peck and Dick Catri were some of the first surfers to appear while inside the Pipeline tube in a published film.

In 2024, Molly Picklum became the first woman to score a perfect 10 surfing Pipeline.

== Competitions ==
The top surfing competitions at this spot include the Pipe Masters (board surfing), the Volcom Pipe Pro, the IBA Pipeline Pro (bodyboarding), and the Pipeline Bodysurfing Classic. Surfers can also submit videos to Surfline's Wave of the Winter competition. The competition focuses on beaches on Oahu's north shore, including Pipeline.

Male elite professional surfers started competing at Pipeline in 1971. There was not an elite professional event for women surfers at Pipeline until 2020, when a male surfer was killed by a shark at Honolua Bay, and because of this the women’s Maui Pro was finished alongside the men at Pipeline. Since then, the best women’s tour for surfing has been held at Pipeline.

== Media ==
- The 1964 documentary Locked In! was filmed at Banzai Pipeline.
- The 1974 episode "The Banzai Pipeline" of Hawaii Five-O was filmed at Banzai Pipeline.
- The 2002 sports film Blue Crush was filmed at Banzai Pipeline.
- The Nickelodeon animated series Rocket Power featured the Pipeline in the 2004 television movie "Island of the Menehune", in which the main characters visit Oahu and attempt to surf it.
- The 2007 film Pipeline featured events at Banzai Pipeline.

== See also ==
- Big wave surfing
