= Mike Stewart (bodyboarder) =

American bodyboarder (born 1963)

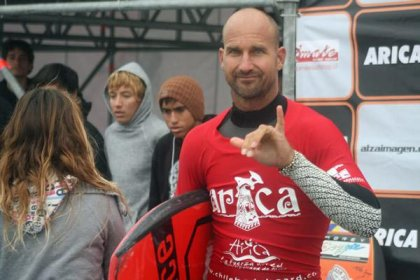
- Stewart at Arica, Chile
- Born: May 17, 1963 (age 63); Hawaii, United States
- Occupation: Bodyboarder
- Title: Mister Pipeline
- Spouse: Lisa Miller (1996 - present)
- Website: mikestewart.com

Mike Stewart (born 1963) is a nine-time World Champion bodyboarder, one of the early pioneers of the bodyboarding sport, a pioneer of big-wave tow-in surfing and also a champion bodysurfer.

Having ridden bodyboards since the inception of the sport, Stewart is the most experienced bodyboarder currently on the tour.

He has won the annual Banzai Pipeline event a record 11 times, from which 9 earned him the world title, and has been crowned the Pipeline Bodysurfing Classic champion a record 15 times. He is the only bodyboarder to have competed in the Banzai Pipeline event since 1982. He has received the title Mister Pipeline for being the best wave rider of any kind: the only non stand-up surfer to achieve this accolade.

Along with fellow bodyboarder Ben Severson, Stewart pioneered surfing Teahupo'o in the late 1980s. This location has since gone on to become a premier global big-wave surfing destination on the WSL circuit.

Stewart is also an accomplished bodysurfer, having won the Pipeline Bodysurfing Classic 14 times to date.

Stewart has been involved in the design and manufacture of bodyboards throughout his career, having a close relationship since childhood with the inventor of the modern bodyboard, Tom Morey. Since 1998, Stewart has manufactured his own line of boards under the label Science Bodyboards.

Hailing from the Oahu of Hawai'i (Honolulu), Stewart is father to two children and now lives on Oahu with his family.

== Filmography ==
Stewart has recently finished an Australian and American Tour premiering his new film "Fire" created and directed by filmmaker Scott Carter.

He appears in the 1998 Zalman King film In God’s Hands.

He appears in the 2002 film Blue Crush.
