= Guilherme Tâmega =

Brazilian bodyboarder

Guilherme Tâmega is a Brazilian bodyboarding champion.

Born 3 September 1972, in Rio de Janeiro, Brazil, Tamega won the Shark Island Challenge bodyboarding event three times in a row. He competed in the international bodyboarding World Tour. Tâmega won six world titles, plus six runner-up places, and was twice crowned ISA World Bodyboarding Games champion. Today, Tamega works as a life guard on the North Shore of Oahu where he has made several rescues at Pipeline.
