= Michael Eppelstun =

Australian bodyboarder

Michael "Eppo" Eppelstun is an Australian professional bodyboarder who won the bodyboarding world championship in 1993. In winning the competition, he became the first Australian and the first non-Hawaiian to win the World title. Eppo helped develop two new moves in the bodyboarding world which ushered in whole new gymnastic approach to riding a bodyboard. First came the Air Roll Spin and shortly later the Blackflip.
