= Bodyboarding =

Surface water sport in which the surfer rides a bodyboard

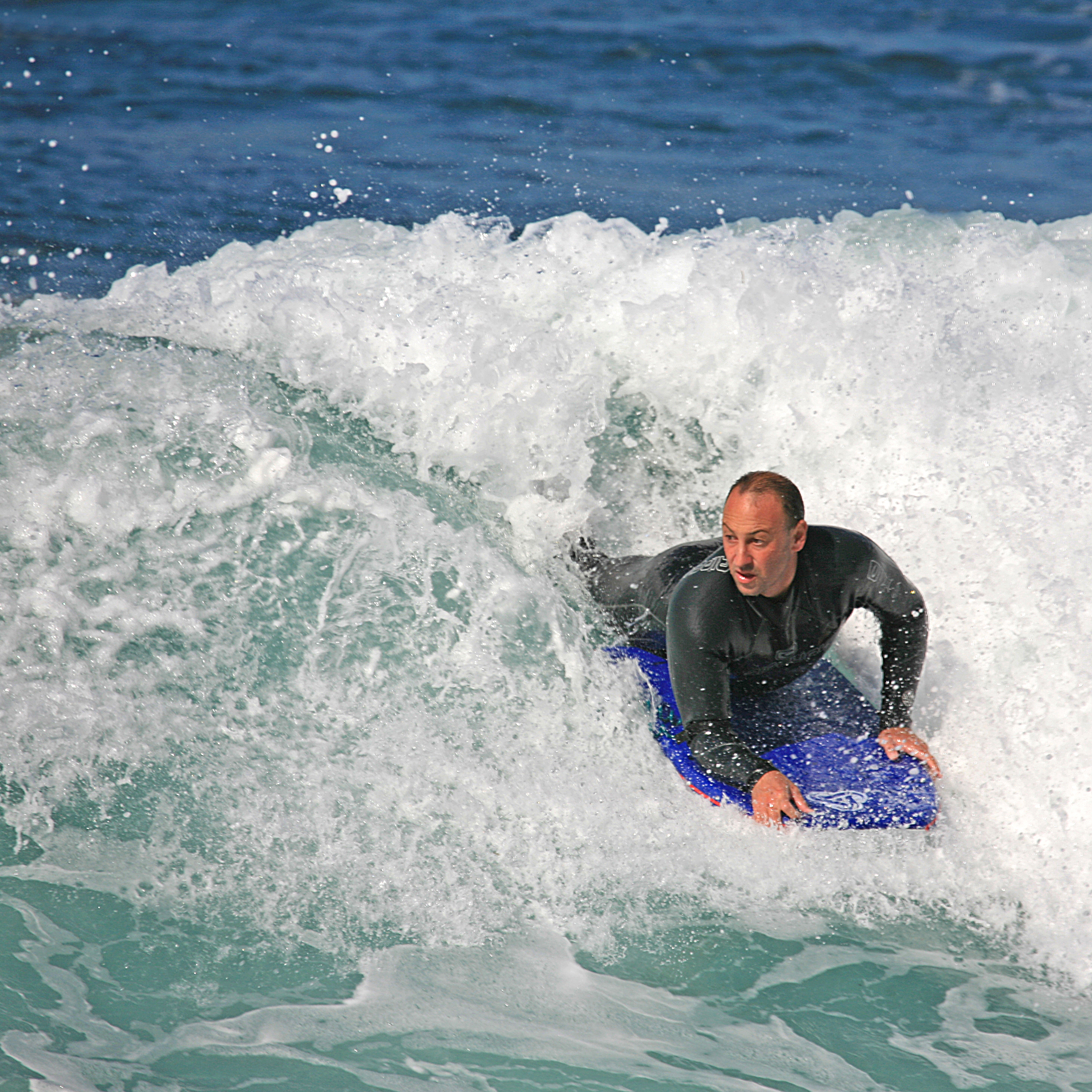
A man riding a wave with a bodyboard

Bodyboarding is a water sport in which the surfer rides a bodyboard on the crest, face, and curl of a wave which is carrying the surfer towards the shore. Bodyboarding is also referred to as Boogieboarding due to the invention of the "Boogie Board" by Tom Morey in 1971. The average bodyboard consists of a short, rectangular piece of hydrodynamic foam. Bodyboarders typically use swim fins for additional propulsion and control while riding a breaking wave.

== Origin ==
Bodyboarding originates from an ancient form of riding waves (surfing) on one's belly. Indigenous Polynesians rode alaia (pronounced ah-lie-ah) boards either on their belly, knees, or feet (in rare instances). Alaia boards were generally made from the wood of Acacia koa and varied in length and shape. They are distinct from the modern stand-up surfboards in that they had no ventral fins. Captain Cook recorded seeing Hawaiian villagers riding such boards when he came to Hawaii in 1778.

The boards he witnessed were about 90 to 180 cm (3 to 6 ft) and were ridden prone (on the belly) or on the knees. Alaia boards then evolved into the more modern paipo (pronounced pipe-oh) board. Paipo boards were either made of wood or fiberglass. Fiberglass boards usually had fins on the bottom. Tom Morey hybridized this form of riding waves on one's belly on a paipo to his craft of shaping stand-up surfboards.

== Different riding forms ==
Bodyboards are shaped to the rider's specific needs and preferences such as height, weight, and form of riding. Three basic forms of riding a bodyboard include prone, dropknee, and stand-up.

=== Prone ===
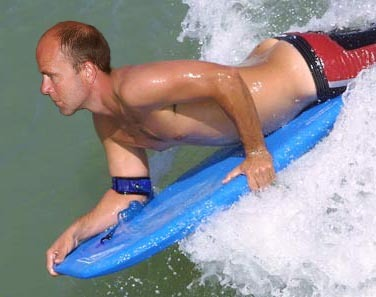
Prone bodyboarding

Riding prone refers to when one rides the wave on their stomach. When the bodyboarder goes left, they place their left hand on the upper left corner of the nose and place their right arm halfway down the rail of the right side of the board. The opposite is true of when the bodyboarder goes right.

=== Dropknee ===
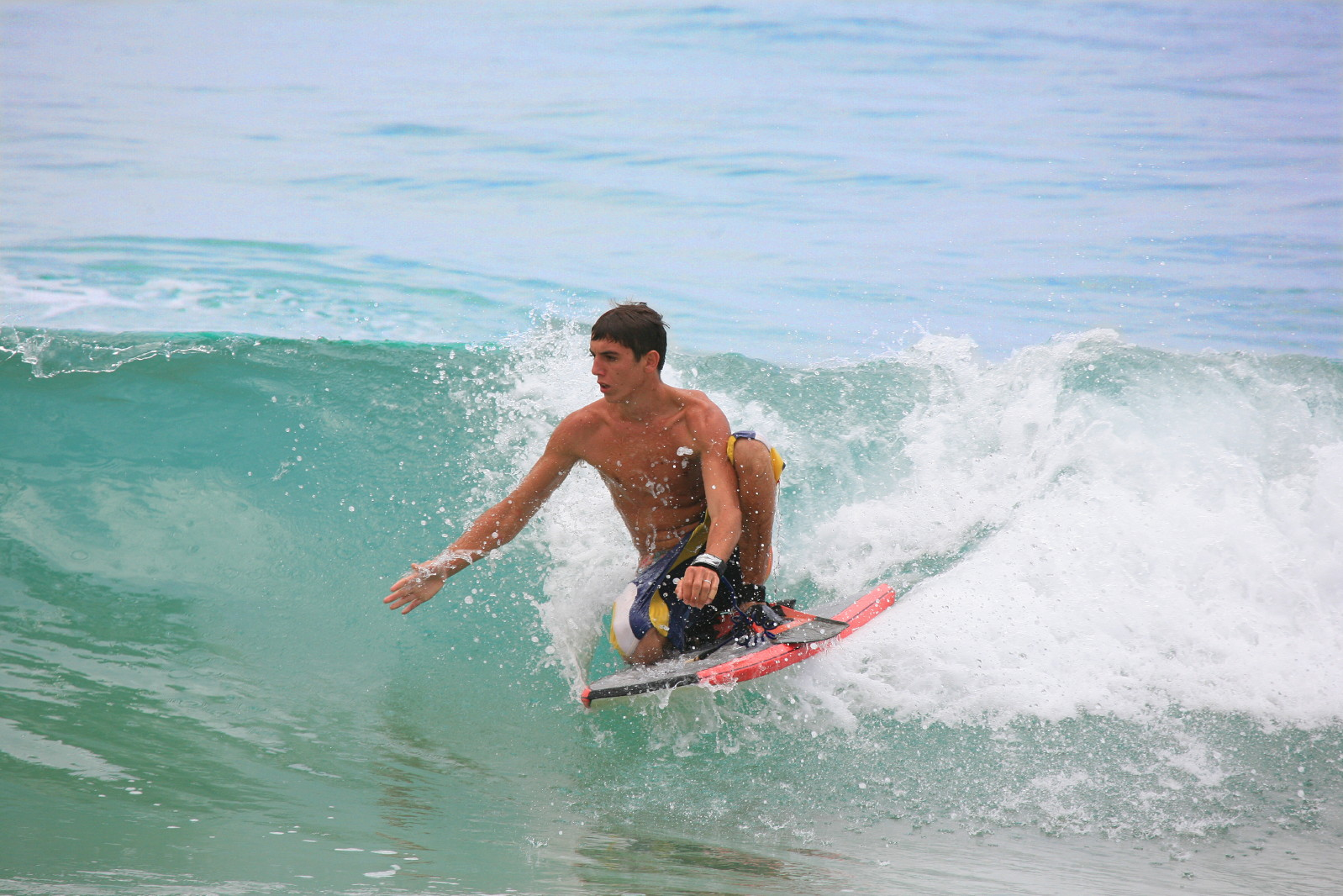
Dropknee bodyboarding

Dropknee is when one places their preferred fin forward on the front of the deck with the opposing knee on the bottom end of the board with their fin dragging in the water. Dropknee was first pioneered in the late 1970s by Hawaii's Jack "The Ripper" Lindholm and sometimes referred to as "Jack Stance". Unlike fiberglass stand-up surfboards, the bodyboards dropknee riders use don't have fins underneath to help maintain a line on the face of a wave or to stop them sliding out so dropknee riders rely on weight transition from rail to rail to hold a line on a wave and turn/snap. On the other hand, the benefit of not having fins underneath the board is that a rider can spin 360 (forward and reverse).

=== Stand-up ===
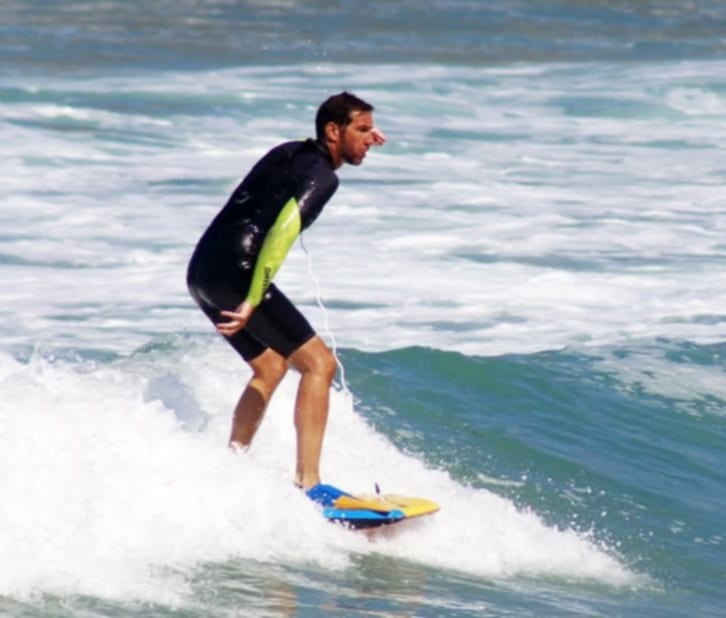
Stand Up bodyboarding

Stand-up consists of standing upright on the board and performing tricks on the face as well as in the air. While it isn't quite as popular as the other two forms of riding a bodyboard, three notable figures that popularized it are Danny Kim, Cavin Yap, and Chris Won Taloa.

== The board ==
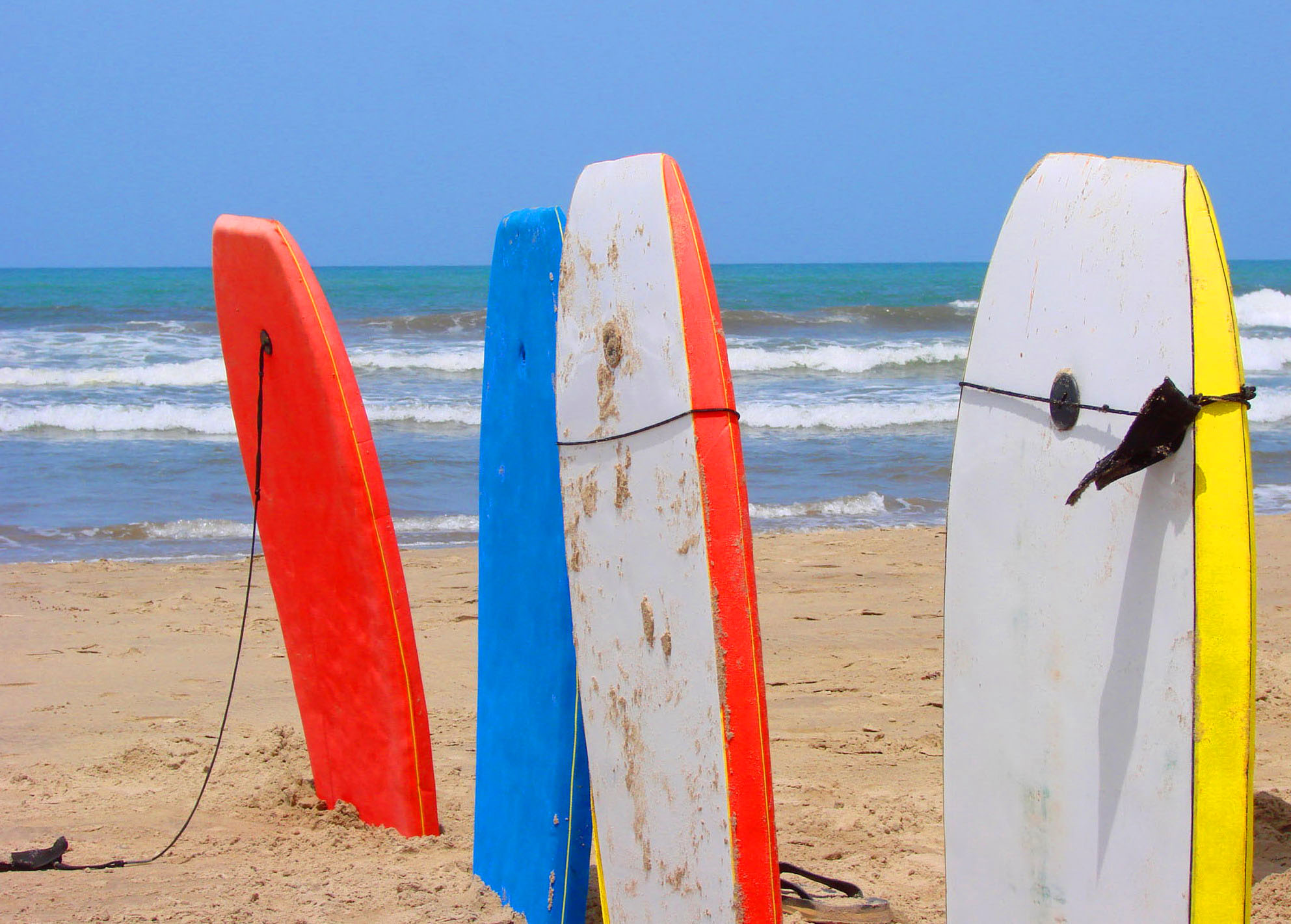
Bodyboards

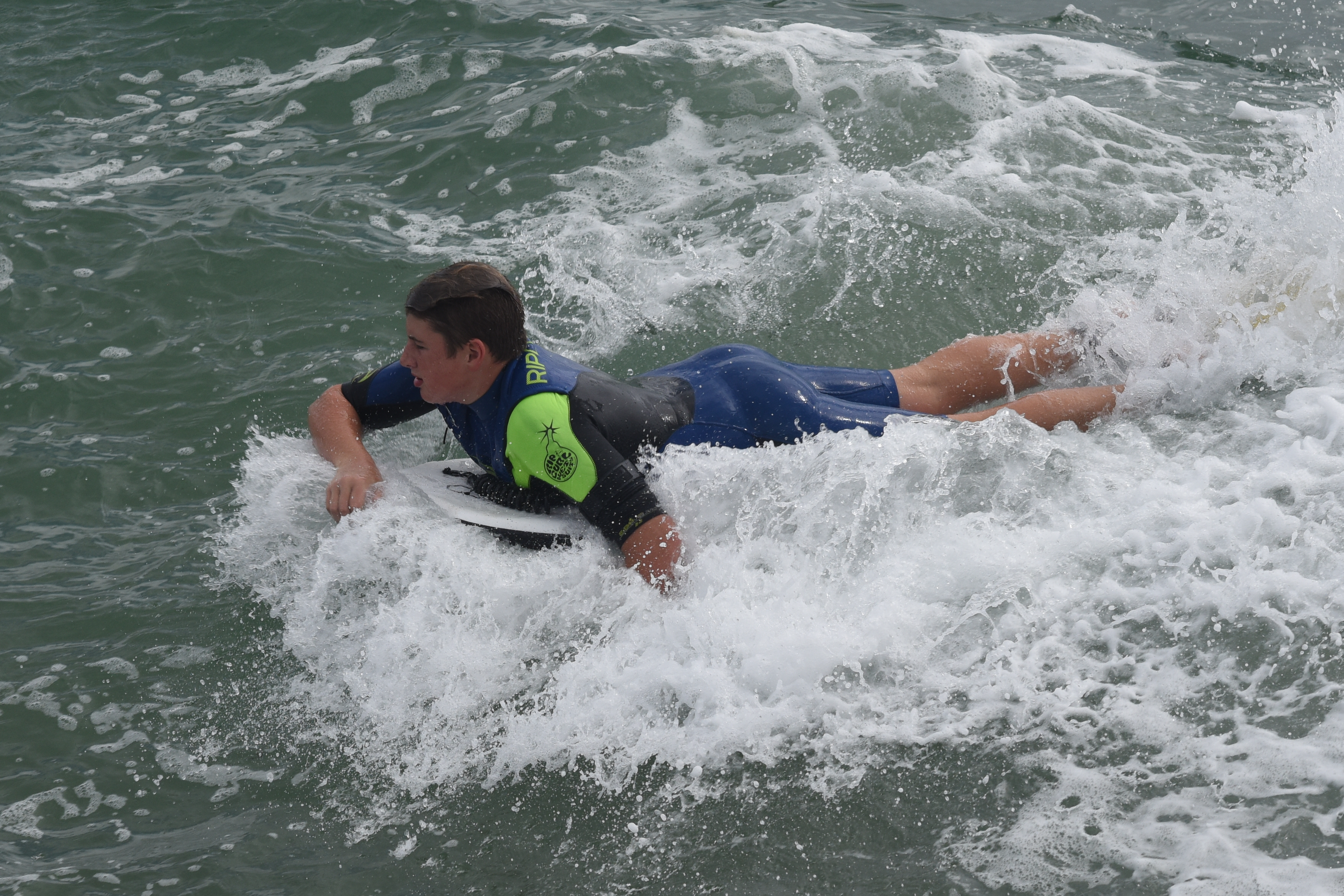
A boy riding a boogie board

=== Materials ===
The bodyboard differs from a surfboard in that it is much shorter (typically 100 to 110 cm (39 to 43 in) in length) and made out of different types of foam. The modern board consists of a foam 'core' encapsulated by a plastic bottom, a softer foam top known as the deck, and softer foam sides known as the rails. The core is made of dow/polyethylene, arcel, polystyrene, or Polypro/polypropylene. The bottom is made of Surlyn, HDPE or Bixby. The deck is made of 8LB or CrossLink. Each type of foam core, deck, or bottom material gives a bodyboard a different amount of flex and control. Speed from the bottom turn is increased when a bodyboarder bottom turns and the board flexes and recoils, releasing energy. If the board flexes too little or too easily, speed is lost. Dow (polyethylene) cores are best suited to cooler waters as they can be too flexible in warm water. Arcel and Polypro (polypropylene) cores are best suited for warmer waters due to their increased overall stiffness.

Most boards on the market today contain one, two, or three rods (usually of carbon or graphite), referred to as stringers, to strengthen the board, reduce deformation, add stiffness and recoil to the core, thus providing greater speed off bottom turns and transitions on the wave. If a single stringer is used, it is placed in the center of the board running parallel to the rails. If two are used, they are placed symmetrically about the y-axis. Triple stringers are a combination of the placement of both a single and double stringer.

=== Construction ===
Deck, rails, and bottom are bonded via various hot air lamination techniques to the core. Previous to the lamination technique, shapers accomplished this by using glue.

=== Features ===
The shape, or curve, of the board affects how it rides. If the wide point of the board is nearer to the nose, the board tends to be best suited to prone riding as the bodyboarder's weight rests further up on the board. Boards with more parallel rails or a narrow nose tend to be more ideal for drop-knee and stand-up riding as the rider's center of gravity tends to rest further back.

Most modern boards are equipped with channels that increase surface area in the critical parts of the board which, in turn, allow it to have varying hold and control on the wave. Originally, skegs were installed to decrease slippage on a wave face. However, progressive bodyboarding has rendered use of such skegs obsolete due to the looseness required for maneuverability on a wave. For such reasons, skegs are rarely used today and, even then, almost exclusively by dropknee or stand-up bodyboarders.

Tail shapes influence the way that boards perform in the line-up. Crescent tails provide the greatest amount of hold in steep waves. Crescent tails are generally preferred by drop-knee riders because the shape interferes less. Crescent tails are also preferred by beginners, due to being able to perform well in varying conditions. Bat tails provide looseness for rail to rail transitions. Prone riders tend to prefer bat tails more than dropknee riders.

== Progression ==
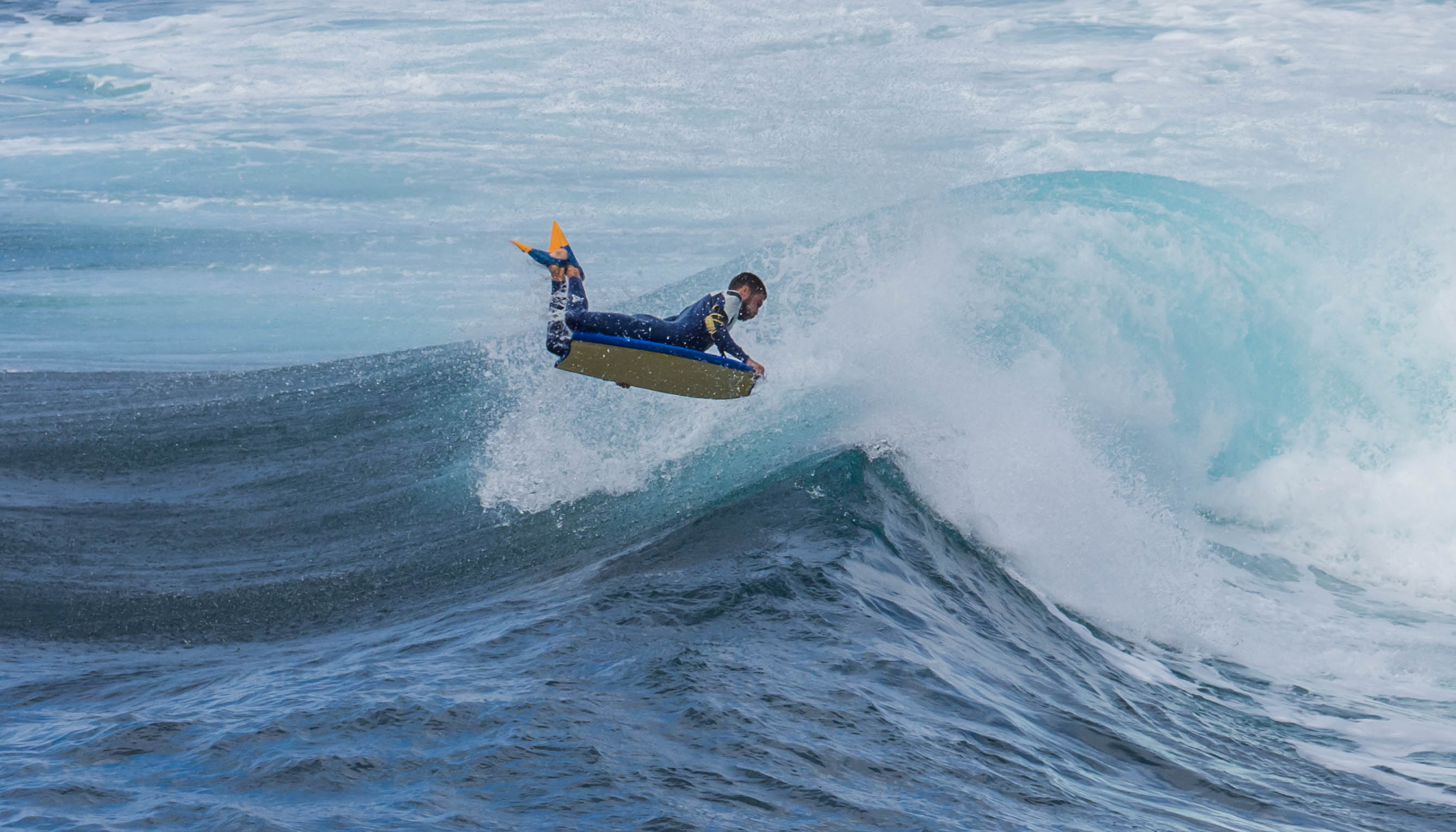
Bodyboarder at Playa del Confital doing an air reverse exit

From the invention of the modern bodyboard in 1971, bodyboarding has experienced growth both as an industry and extreme sport. With its origins in America, over the past decade the industry has shifted from a primarily American to a global industry. The sport has grown into a worldwide industry with strongholds in Australia, Peru, Chile, Japan, Canary Islands (Spain), and South Africa. The sport has many levels to it ranging from causal enjoyment to professional near perfection.

== Male bodyboarders ==
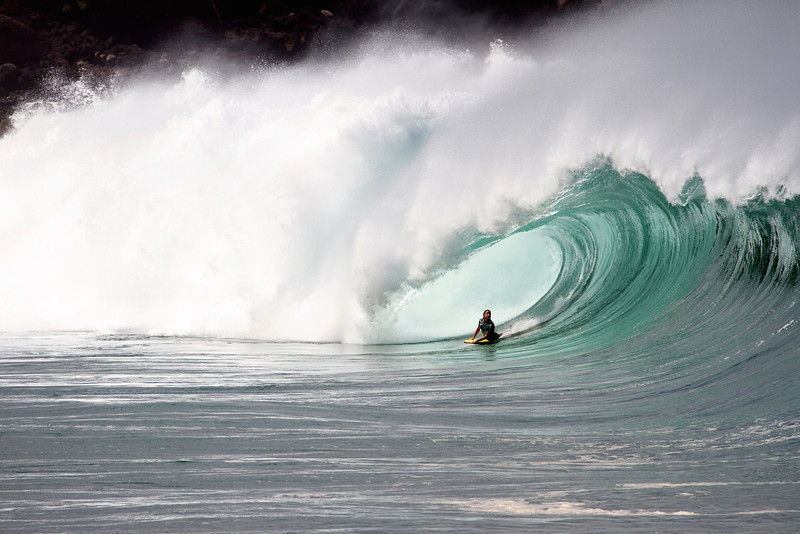
David "Dubb" Hubbard charging a large wave at Waimea Shorebreak

- Mike Stewart (Hawaii, USA) is considered the father of modern bodyboarding, acclaimed as one of the best wave riders of all time, and holds nine world titles. He is also the only bodyboarder to receive the Mr. Pipeline title.
- Ben Severson (Hawaii, USA) is a pioneer of bodyboarding, world champion, and competitive rival of Mike Stewart for over fifteen years.
- Guilherme Tamega (Brazil) is second only to Stewart for number of world titles, holding six. He has gained reputation and fame for his aggressive riding style and approach in both small and heavy surf.
- Mike "Eppo" Eppulston is the first Australian and also the first non-Hawaiian to win the World Title (1993). He is also known for creating the ARS and backflip.
- Jeff Hubbard (Hawaii, USA) is best known for his phenomenal aerial approach to bodyboarding. He currently holds three world titles.
- Ryan Hardy (Australia) is influential in the progression of Australian and international bodyboarding. Known for his fluid yet powerful style of surfing.
- Ben Player (Australia) is also considered one of the greatest influences in bodyboarding both Australia and the world. He holds three world titles.
- Andre Botha (South Africa) is the youngest athlete to win the world title (1998). He then won a second world title the next tour season of 1999. Known for his extreme approach to wave riding in shorebreaks and heavy waves.
- Alexandre de Pontes (Xandinho), was the first Brazilian to reach the finals in the Pipeline world bodyboarding championship. Six-time world champion Guilherme Tâmega considers Xandinho one of the greatest bodyboarders of all time.
- Hugo Pinheiro was placed second at the ISA World Surfing Games in 2006.

== Female bodyboarders ==
Phylis Dameron was the first person, man or woman, to ride big Waimea Bay on a bodyboard in the late 1970s. During the early 1990s in Brazil, Mariana Nogueira, Glenda Koslowski, and Stephanie Petterson set standards that pushed women's bodyboarding to a world class level. Stephanie Petterson won the first official World Championship of Women's Bodyboarding at Pipeline in 1990. It was the first women's event ever held there and initiated the longest running women's wave sport event in the world. 2009 marked the event's 20th anniversary.

- Alexandra Rinder is the top ranked female bodyboarder in the world.
- Sari Ohhara is the third ranked top female bodyboarder in the world.
- Jessica Becker is the fourth ranked top female bodyboarder in the world.

== World Champions ==
From 1982 to 1993, the winner of the International Morey Boogie Bodyboard Pro Championships at Pipeline, Hawaii was considered world champion. Since then a world tour has determined the sport's champion. The world tour has been administered by a variety of organisations.

== Results ==
=== Men ===
Year	Competition	Winner	Country
1982	International Morey Boogie Bodyboard Pro Championships	Daniel Kaimi	Hawaii
1983	International Morey Boogie Bodyboard Pro Championships	Mike Stewart	Hawaii
1984	International Morey Boogie Bodyboard Pro Championships	Mike Stewart	Hawaii
1985	Not held		
1986	International Morey Boogie Bodyboard Pro Championships	Ben Severson	Hawaii
1987	International Morey Boogie Bodyboard Pro Championships	Mike Stewart	Hawaii
1988	International Morey Boogie Bodyboard Pro Championships	Mike Stewart	Hawaii
1989	International Morey Boogie Bodyboard Pro Championships	Mike Stewart	Hawaii
1990	International Morey Boogie Bodyboard Pro Championships	Mike Stewart	Hawaii
1991	International Morey Boogie Bodyboard Pro Championships	Mike Stewart	Hawaii
1992	International Morey Boogie Bodyboard Pro Championships	Mike Stewart	Hawaii
1993	International Morey Boogie Bodyboard Pro Championships	Michael Eppelstun	Australia
1994	International Morey Boogie Bodyboard Pro Championships	Mike Stewart	Hawaii
1994	GOB World Tour	Guilherme Tamega	Brazil
1995	GOB World Tour	Guilherme Tamega	Brazil
1996	GOB World Tour	Guilherme Tamega	Brazil
1997	GOB World Tour	Guilherme Tamega	Brazil
1998	GOB World Tour	Andre Botha	South Africa
1999	GOB World Tour	Andre Botha	South Africa
2000	GOB Super Tour	Paulo Barcellos	Brazil
2001	GOB Super Tour	Guilherme Tamega	Brazil
2002	GOB Super Tour	Guilherme Tamega	Brazil
2003	IBA World Tour	Damian King	Australia
2004	IBA World Tour	Damian King	Australia
2005	IBA World Tour	Ben Player	Australia
2006	IBA World Tour	Jeff Hubbard	Hawaii
2007	IBA World Tour	Ben Player	Australia
2008	IBA World Tour	Uri Valadao	Brazil
2009	IBA World Tour	Jeff Hubbard	Hawaii
2010	IBA World Tour	Amaury Lavernhe	France
2011	IBA World Tour	Pierre-Louis Costes	France
2012	IBA World Tour	Jeff Hubbard	USA (Hawaii)
2013	IBA World Tour	Ben Player	Australia
2014	APB World Tour	Amaury Lavernhe	France
2015	APB World Tour	Jared Houston	South Africa
2016	APB World Tour	Pierre-Louis Costes	France
2017	APB World Tour	Iain Campbell	South Africa
2018	APB World Tour	Jared Houston	South Africa
2019	APB World Tour	Tristan Roberts	South Africa
2020	IBC World Tour	(No tour) COVID-19	--
2021	IBC World Tour	(No tour) COVID-19	--
2022	IBC World Tour	Tristan Roberts	South Africa

=== Women ===
Year	Competition	Winner	Country
1987	International Morey Boogie Bodyboard Pro Championships	Glenda Kozlowski	Brazil
1988	Not held		
1989	International Morey Boogie Bodyboard Pro Championships	Glenda Kozlowski	Brazil
1990	International Morey Boogie Bodyboard Pro Championships	Stephanie Pettersen	Brazil
1991	International Morey Boogie Bodyboard Pro Championships	Glenda Kozlowski	Brazil
1992	International Morey Boogie Bodyboard Pro Championships	Mariana Nogueira	Brazil
1993	International Morey Boogie Bodyboard Pro Championships	Stephanie Pettersen	Brazil
1994	GOB World Tour	Stephanie Pettersen	Brazil
1995	GOB World Tour	Mariana Nogueira	Brazil
1995	GOB World Tour	Claudia Ferrari	Brazil
1996	GOB World Tour	Daniela Freitas	Brazil
1997	GOB World Tour	Daniela Freitas	Brazil
1998	GOB World Tour	Mariana Nogueira	Brazil
1999	GOB World Tour	Karla Costa Taylor	Brazil
2000	GOB World Tour	Soraia Rocha	Brazil
2001	GOB World Tour	Soraia Rocha	Brazil
2002	GOB World Tour	Stephanie Pettersen	Brazil
2003	IBA World Tour	Neymara Carvalho	Brazil
2004	IBA World Tour	Neymara Carvalho	Brazil
2005	IBA World Tour	Kira Llewellyn	Australia
2006	IBA World Tour	Marina Taylor	Spain
2007	IBA World Tour	Neymara Carvalho	Brazil
2008	IBA World Tour	Neymara Carvalho	Brazil
2009	IBA World Tour	Neymara Carvalho	Brazil
2010	IBA World Tour	Isabela Sousa	Brazil
2011	IBA World Tour	Eunate Aguirre	Spain
2012	IBA World Tour	Isabela Sousa	Brazil
2013	IBA World Tour	Isabela Sousa	Brazil
2014	APB World Tour	Alexandra Rinder	Spain
2015	APB World Tour	Alexandra Rinder	Spain
2016	APB World Tour	Isabela Sousa	Brazil
2017	APB World Tour	Joana Schenker	Portugal
2018	APB World Tour	Ayaka Suzuki	Japan
2019	APB World Tour	Sari Ohhara	Japan
2020	IBC World Tour	(No tour) COVID-19	--
2021	IBC World Tour	(No tour) COVID-19	--
2022	IBC World Tour	Isabela Sousa	Brazil

=== ISA World Bodyboard Championship ===
Año	Host country	Gold	Silver	Bronze	4º	Ref.
2011	Canary Islands, Spain	France (5.860)	Spain (4.871)	Morocco (3.830)	Australia (3.813)	
2012	Margarita Island, Venezuela	Brazil (9.368)	France (8.645)	Venezuela (8.449)	South Africa (7.258)	
2013	Playa Parguito, Venezuela	Brazil (9.585)	Venezuela (9.119)	Chile (8.189)	Costa Rica (6.595)	
2014	Iquique, Chile	Chile (8.738)	France (8.565)	South Africa (8.336)	Portugal (7.227)	
2015	Iquique, Chile	Brazil (5.246)	Chile (4.963)	France (4.506)	Peru (4.313)	
