= List of sports films =

This compilation of films covers all sports activities. Sports films have been made since the era of silent films, such as the 1915 film The Champion starring Charlie Chaplin. Films in this genre can range from serious (Raging Bull) to silly (Horse Feathers). A classic theme for sports films is the triumph of an individual or team who prevail despite the difficulties, standard elements of melodrama.

== Team sport ==
=== Australian rules football ===
Title	Year	Genre	Notes
The Great Macarthy	1975	Comedy	
The Club	1980	Comedy/Drama	Boardroom and dressing room intrigues spill onto the field for an Australian rules football club.
Australian Rules	2002	Drama	
Blinder	2013	Drama	
Aussie Rules the World	2014	Documentary	

=== Cheerleading and dance ===
Title	Year	Genre	Notes
Debbie Does Dallas	1978	Adult	Pornographic film, no connection to the Dallas Cowboys or their cheerleaders.
Dallas Cowboys Cheerleaders	1979	Drama	Made-for-TV drama about the famous NFL cheerleading squad.
Dallas Cowboys Cheerleaders II	1980	Drama	TV sequel to the 1979 movie.
Laker Girls	1990	Drama	Television film about the Los Angeles basketball dance team.
Willing to Kill: The Texas Cheerleader Story	1992	Drama	TV film based on Wanda Holloway's 1991 attempt to hire a hit man to kill the mother of her daughter's cheerleading rival. With Lesley Ann Warren as Holloway.
The Positively True Adventures of the Alleged Texas Cheerleader-Murdering Mom	1993	Comedy	A more light-hearted TV movie also based on the Wanda Holloway story, with Emmy-winning performances by Holly Hunter and Beau Bridges.
A Friend to Die For	1994	Drama	Tori Spelling and Kellie Martin in a TV film based on a California cheerleader's murder.
But I'm a Cheerleader	1999	Romance	Natasha Lyonne as a cheerleader whose parents disapprove of her personal life.
Bring It On	2000	Comedy	A clash between rival cheerleading squads, starring Kirsten Dunst.
Sugar & Spice	2001	Comedy	Minnesota high school girls rob a bank. With Mena Suvari and James Marsden.
All Cheerleaders Die	2001	Horror comedy	
Gotta Kick It Up!	2002	Family comedy	Television film based on true story about middle schoolers.
Cheerleader Queens	2003	Comedy	Thai film
Bring It On Again	2004	Comedy	Sequel to the 2000 film.
Bring It On: All or Nothing	2006	Comedy	Second sequel to the 2000 film.
Bring It On: In It to Win It	2007	Comedy	Third sequel to the 2000 film.
Fab Five: The Texas Cheerleader Scandal	2008	Drama	Based on controversial true events involving five girls from Texas.
Bring It On: Fight to the Finish	2009	Comedy	Fourth sequel to the 2000 film.
Fired Up!	2009	Comedy	Football players con their way into a cheerleading camp.
Attack of the 50 Foot Cheerleader	2012	Comedy	An experimental drug makes a cheerleader grow 10 times her normal size.
All Cheerleaders Die	2013	Horror comedy	Remake of the 2001 film.
Bring It On: Worldwide Cheersmack	2017	Comedy	Fifth sequel to the 2000 film.
Daughters of the Sexual Revolution	2018	Documentary	Documentary about the Dallas Cowboys Cheerleaders.
Bring It On: Cheer or Die	2022	Horror comedy	Sixth sequel to the 2000 film.

=== Cricket ===
Title	Year	Genre	Notes
Badger's Green	1934	Comedy	
Badger's Green	1949	Comedy	
It's Not Cricket	1949	Comedy	British army officers in Post-World War II Germany try to track down a wanted war criminal, who unbeknownst to them is on their cricket team.
The Final Test	1953	Drama	A famed cricketer wants his rebellious son to attend his last match.
Playing Away	1987	Comedy	TV film
Awwal Number	1990	Action	
Lagaan	2001	Drama	In the 1890s, a group of Indian cricket novices must defeat a well-trained team of British officers to avoid punitive taxes on their village. Received numerous awards and nominations, including a nomination for the Academy Award for Best Foreign Language Film.
Wondrous Oblivion	2003	Comedy, drama	
Iqbal	2005	Drama	
Hit for Six	2007	Drama	
Chennai 600028	2007	Comedy, drama	Tamil film
Chain Kulii Ki Main Kulii	2007	Comedy, drama	
Say Salaam India	2007	Drama	
Hattrick	2007	Comedy, drama	
Meerabai Not Out	2008	Drama	
Jannat	2008	Romantic, crime drama	Hindi film
Hansie	2008	Drama	Tells the story of South African cricketer Hansie Cronje.
I Know How Many Runs You Scored Last Summer	2008	Horror comedy	
Victory	2009	Drama	
Dil Bole Hadippa!	2009	Comedy, drama	
Tournament – Play & Replay	2010	Road movie	
Patiala House	2011	Family drama	
Fire in Babylon	2011	Documentary	Covers the record-breaking West Indies cricket team of the 1970s and 1980s.
Golconda High School	2011	Drama	Telugu film
Ferrari Ki Sawaari	2012	Comedy, drama	
Main Hoon Shahid Afridi	2013	Drama	A boy who dreams to become Shahid Afridi finds himself down on luck when the only club he ever knew goes bankrupt.
Dhoni	2013	Drama	An Indian Tamil-Telugu bilingual film highlighting the conflict between a middle class widower and his son, who is very good at cricket but poor at academics.
Save Your Legs!	2013	Comedy	
1983	2014	Comedy, drama	Ten-year-old Rameshan (Nivin Pauly) is hooked to the game of cricket when India wins the World Cup in 1983. The film shows his life from that point on until the present.
Jeeva	2014	Drama	An Indian Tamil film depicting the struggles of young man in his quest to become a leading cricketer.
The Little Master	2015	Documentary	Made for TV as part of the ESPN Films Presents series, part of the network's 30 for 30 project. The life and impact of Sachin Tendulkar, set against the backdrop of India's quest to win the 2011 Cricket World Cup.
Azhar	2016	Biographical	The life of former Indian international cricketer Mohammad Azharuddin.
M.S. Dhoni: The Untold Story	2016	Biographical	The life of Indian ODI captain Mahendra Singh Dhoni.
Sachin: A Billion Dreams	2016	Biographical	The life of former Indian international cricketer Sachin Tendulkar.
Chennai 600028 II: Second Innings	2016	Comedy, drama	Sequel to Chennai 600028.
Kanaa	2018	Drama	
83	2021	Drama	Based on the India national cricket team that won the 1983 Cricket World Cup.
Kaun Pravin Tambe?	2022	Biographical	Based on the Life of Pravin Tambe who becomes the oldest cricketer to debut at the age of 40 proving "Age Is Just A Number"
Shabaash Mithu	2022	Biographical	The life of former Indian women's cricket captain Mithali Raj.

=== Curling ===
Title	Year	Genre	Notes
Men with Brooms	2002	Romantic comedy	
Kong Curling	2011	Comedy	
Gerri Curls	2021	Comedy	

=== Handball ===
Title	Year	Genre	Notes
Szansa	1979	Drama	
Bulggot shoot tonki	1993	Family drama	
Forever the Moment	2008	Drama	South Korean film about handball at the 2004 Summer Olympics.
Projekt Gold	2007	Documentary	Film about the German national handball team at the 2007 World Men's Handball Championship.

=== Field hockey ===
Title	Year	Genre	Notes
Chak De! India	2007	Drama	A disgraced former field hockey player (Shahrukh Khan) seeks redemption by coaching the India women's national field hockey team. Won numerous Indian film awards.
Prithipal Singh... A Story	2015	Documentary	Recounts the life of Indian field hockey legend Prithipal Singh.
Khido Khundi	2017	Drama	A young man decides to play field hockey and beat overseas players as he knows about the rich history of the village of Sansarpur in Punjab, which has produced over 15 hockey legends who represented not only India but other countries as well.
Gold	2018	Drama	A newly independent India competes in field hockey at the 1948 Summer Olympics. Film has fictional characters based on Balbir Singh Sr., Dhyan Chand and others.
Harjeeta	2018	Biographical	Film based on the life of Harjeet Singh Tuli, captain of the Indian junior hockey team of India that won a World Cup in field hockey.
Soorma	2018	Drama	Biopic based on the life of hockey player Sandeep Singh, starring Diljit Dosanjh and Taapsee Pannu.

=== Kabaddi ===
Title	Year	Genre	Language	Notes
Okkadu	2003	Drama	Telugu	
Ghilli	2004	Drama	Tamil	A remake of Okkadu.
Ajay	2006	Drama	Kannada	A remake of Okkadu.
Kabaddi	2009	Drama	Kannada	
Vennila Kabadi Kuzhu	2009	Drama	Tamil	Also remade as Bheemili Kabaddi Jattu.
Kabaddi Ik Mohabbat	2010	Drama	Punjabi	
Kabaddi Once Again	2012	Drama	Punjabi	Film set in England.
Aryan	2014	Drama	Kannada	
Panga	2020	Drama	Hindi	A female kabaddi player comes back to the sport after marriage and having a kid.

=== Lacrosse ===
Title	Year	Genre	Notes
Wild Child	2008	Drama	A California girl (Emma Roberts) moves to England, where she develops a skill for lacrosse.
A Warrior's Heart	2011	Drama	A teen lacrosse star (Kellan Lutz) is instructed by a former wartime friend of his father.
Crooked Arrows	2012	Drama	A Native American high school lacrosse team rediscovers its heritage in a New York league.
Fantastic Lies	2016	Documentary	Made for TV as a part of ESPN's 30 for 30 series. A 10-year retrospective of the Duke lacrosse case.
Keepers of the Game	2016	Documentary	An all-Mohawk girls' high school team in New York face opposition from within their tribe and struggle to keep their funding.
The Grizzlies	2018	Drama	Based on the true story of a youth lacrosse team set up to combat youth suicide in the community of Kugluktuk, Nunavut.

=== Rugby ===
Title	Year	Genre	Code	Notes
This Sporting Life	1963	Drama	Rugby league	Richard Harris stars in an Oscar-nominated performance as a coal miner recruited to play rugby.
Grand Slam	1978	Comedy	Rugby union	Old friends including Hugh Griffith are eager to attend Wales' match with France.
The First Kangaroos	1988	Comedy, drama	Rugby league	Dennis Waterman stars in a story of an Australian team on a tour of Great Britain.
Old Scores	1991	Comedy, drama	Rugby union	A controversial match between New Zealand and Wales is replayed 25 years later with the original teams. Starring Windsor Davies, Martyn Sanderson, and John Bach.
Up 'n' Under	1998	Comedy	Rugby league	Story of an inept pub team, based on a John Godber play.
School Wars: Hero	2004		Rugby union	
Sye	2004		Rugby union	Story of a students' challenge to win a rugby game to retain their college.
Murderball	2005	Documentary	Wheelchair rugby	Oscar-nominated documentary about rival quadraplegic athletes aiming for the Paralympic Games.
Freetime Machos	2005	Documentary	Rugby union	
Footy Legends	2006	Comedy	Rugby league	Story of a young Vietnamese-Australian's obsession with rugby.
Number 10	2006		Rugby union	
The Final Winter	2007	Drama	Rugby league	Story of an Australian's fight to keep commercialism from ruining the game.
Forever Strong	2008	Drama	Rugby union	Based on an amalgam of true stories from the rugby program of Highland High School in Salt Lake City.
Invictus	2009	Drama	Rugby union	Based on the 1995 Rugby World Cup and the ultimately victorious host team, South Africa. Morgan Freeman as Nelson Mandela and Matt Damon as Springboks captain François Pienaar.
The 16th Man	2010	Documentary	Rugby union	Made for TV as part of ESPN's 30 for 30 series. Also chronicles the 1995 Rugby World Cup, but focuses more on Mandela's support of the Springboks and its effect on post-apartheid South Africa.
A Giant Awakens: the Rise of American Rugby	2010	Documentary	Rugby union	
Getroud Met Rugby: Die Onvertelde Stori	2011	Drama	Rugby union	A struggling rugby union player fights to regain his place in his former team by coaching a troubled ex-convict to be a star player himself. Starring Izak Davel and Altus Theart. A tie-in to Season 4 of the Afrikaans TV series Getroud Met Rugby.
The Kick	2014	Drama	Rugby union	NZ made-for-TV film dramatizing how Stephen Donald went from afterthought in the All Blacks fly-half pool to scoring what proved to be the winning points in the 2011 Rugby World Cup final.
Prep School	2015	Drama	Rugby union	When the star player of an elite prep school rugby team suffers an emotional collapse, his friends and teammates respond in their own ways, ranging from heroic to horrifying. Starring Carly Schroeder and Clayton Rohner.
Chasing Great	2016	Documentary	Rugby union	New Zealand film exploring the life and career of All Blacks legend Richie McCaw against the backdrop of his final playing season leading up to the 2015 Rugby World Cup.
Mercenary	2016	Drama	Rugby union	French film focusing on the journey of a young man from the French possession of Wallis and Futuna to play in Metropolitan France. Lead character portrayed by real-life professional player Toki Pilioko.
Society of the Snow	2023	Drama	Rugby union	Spanish film about the Uruguayan Old Christians Club rugby team, whose plane carrying them and their supporters to a rugby match in Chile crashed in the Andes Mountains in 1972. The cooperative teamwork that the surviving team members learned through playing rugby was one factor in their ultimate escape.

=== Volleyball ===
Title	Year	Genre	Notes
Spiker	1986	Drama	A strict coach (Michael Parks) trains candidates for U.S. men's volleyball team.
Side Out	1990	Comedy	California beach volleyball story starring C. Thomas Howell.
The Iron Ladies	2000	Comedy	Thai film about a men's (and transgender) volleyball team.
The Iron Ladies 2	2003	Comedy	Sequel to the surprise hit about a gay volleyball team having troubles with their success and fame, and how they reunite after they split because of creative differences.
Air Bud: Spikes Back	2003	Family comedy	Direct-to-video film in the Air Bud series.
All You've Got	2006	Drama	MTV story of rival girls volleyball players.
Cloud 9	2006	Comedy	Burt Reynolds coaches volleyball-playing Malibu strippers at the beach.
Impact Point	2008	Thriller	Beach volleyball player might have a murderer after her.
Green Flash	2008	Drama	Frustrated basketball player tries his hand at volleyball.
Beach Spike	2010	Drama	Hong Kong film combining martial arts and beach volleyball.
The Miracle Season	2018	Drama	Based on the 2011 girls' season of Iowa City West High School, attempting to defend a state title after the death of its star setter in a moped accident.

=== Water polo ===
Title	Year	Genre	Notes
Red Wood Pigeon	1989	Comedy, drama	
Freedom's Fury	2006	Documentary	A look back at the 1956 Blood in the Water match between Hungary and the USSR.
Children of Glory	2006	Drama	A dramatization of the Hungarian team's experience at the 1956 Summer Olympics.

=== Triathlon ===
Title	Year	Genre	Notes
100 metros	2016		Spanish film that chronicles a man with multiple sclerosis attempting the Ironman Triathlon despite doctors advice that he cannot manage 100 meters.
Luca	2021	Fantasy	Set on the Italian Riviera, the film centers on Luca Paguro, a sea monster boy with the ability to assume human form while on land, who explores the town of Portorosso with his new best friend Alberto Scorfano, experiencing a life-changing summer.

== Racing sports ==
=== Aviation sport ===
Title	Year	Genre	Notes
Going Wild	1930	Comedy	Pretending to be a pilot, Rollo Smith (Joe E. Brown) enters a $25,000 air race.
Flying Devils	1933	Romance	"Speed" Hardy (Ralph Bellamy) and a crew of air daredevils perform dangerous stunts.
The King's Cup	1933	Drama	A girl helps a pilot regain his nerve before entering Cup endurance race.
Women in the Wind	1939	Drama	Aviatrix Janet Steele (Kay Francis) enters a derby from California to Cleveland.
The Sound Barrier	1952	Drama	Story of brave test pilots, directed by David Lean.
Those Magnificent Men in their Flying Machines	1965	Comedy	A lighthearted tale of a London-to-Paris air race in 1910.
The Great Waldo Pepper	1975	Drama	Depicts 1920s barnstorming and its consequences. Robert Redford stars as the title character.
Thunder Over Reno	2008	Drama	
Planes	2013	Comedy	A crop duster competes in a national championship race.

=== Motorboat racing ===
Title	Year	Genre	Type	Notes
Top Speed	1930	Comedy	Speedboat	Farce about a faker who enters a race, then is bribed to lose it on purpose.
Speed Demon	1933	Drama	Motorboat	The disgraced Speed Morrow attempts to win a race and rescue a kidnapped child.
Motor Madness	1937	Drama	Speedboat	Gamblers try to coax a guy to deliberately lose a big motorboat race in Santa Monica, California.
Madison	2001	Drama	Hydroplane	Loosely based on Miss Madison, a boat raced by a community-owned team from Madison, Indiana, and especially on the boat's 1971 victory in the town's Madison Regatta.

=== Motorcycle racing ===
Title	Year	Genre	Type	Notes
Money for Speed	1933	Drama	Motorcycle	Motorcycle racers vie at speedway and over love of Ida Lupino.
No Limit	1935	Comedy	Road racing	A George Formby farce set at an Isle of Man race.
Once a Jolly Swagman	1949	Drama	Motorcycle speedway	British film starring Dirk Bogarde.
The Pace That Thrills	1952	Drama	Motorcycle	Two bike racers complete for a reporter's affection.
The Sidehackers	1969	Drama	Sidecar cycles	A racer seeks revenge after being assaulted by outlaw bikers.
Little Fauss and Big Halsy	1970	Drama	Motorcycle	Robert Redford stars as a ladies' man who betrays his best friend.
On Any Sunday	1971	Documentary	Motorcycle	Steve McQueen and others discuss racing in Bruce Brown film.
Silver Dream Racer	1980	Drama	Road racing	David Essex stars as an aspiring motorcycle racer.
Spetters	1980	Drama	Motorcycle	Erotic film by Paul Verhoeven on Dutch motorcycle racers.
Take It to the Limit	1980	Documentary	Motorcycle	Covers speedway, desert racing, hill climb and more from 1970s.
The Last Hero	1982	Drama	Road racing	
Motocrossed	2001	Comedy	Motocross	A young girl poses as twin brother to win motocross race after he breaks a leg.
Biker Boyz	2003	Drama	Motorcycle	Laurence Fishburne stars in a tale of underground drag races.
Faster	2003	Documentary	Motorcycle	Behind the scenes at the MotoGP world championship.
The World's Fastest Indian	2005	Biographical	Land speed record	Burt Munro (Anthony Hopkins) pursues a land speed record on his Indian Scout motorcycle.

=== Rowing ===
Title	Year	Genre	Notes
Freshman Love	1936	Musical	A coach's daughter recruits crew members for the school's rowing team.
A Yank at Oxford	1938	Drama	An arrogant American (Robert Taylor) tries to earn respect by rowing for Oxford.
Let's Go Collegiate	1941	Comedy	When a rowing teammate gets drafted, Frankie Monahan (Frankie Darro) recruits a new crew member to impersonate him.
Oxford Blues	1984	Comedy, drama	Nick Di Angelo (Rob Lowe) leaves Las Vegas to pursue an Englishwoman and ends up rowing for Oxford.
The Boy in Blue	1986	Drama	Nicolas Cage stars as a Canadian sculler.
True Blue	1996	Drama	A fact-based story involving a 1987 Oxford vs. Cambridge race.
Give It All	1998	Drama	Japanese film about an all-girls rowing team.
Queen of the Night	2001	Drama	Croatian film.
Summer Storm	2004	Drama	German film about young boys rowing in a regatta.
Backwards	2012	Drama	A high-level female rower becomes a high-school coach.
Bert and Dickie	2012	Biographical	Two men up in sculls for the 1948 Summer Olympics.
Heart of Champions	2021	Drama	An Army Vet takes over a dysfunctional Ivy League row team.
The Boys in the Boat	2023	Biographical	About the US rowing team at the 1936 Summer Olympics.

=== Sailing ===
Title	Year	Genre	Notes
The Lipton Cup	1913	Drama	A drama of a sailboat race and the ship-builder who builds the yacht that wins the Lipton Cup.
Kon-Tiki	1950	Documentary	Oscar-winning film on Thor Heyerdahl's 1947 adventure.
Windjammer	1958	Documentary	Following a Norwegian vessel's 17,500-nautical-mile voyage.
The Dove	1974	Drama	Based on the true story of a 16-year-old's five-year sail around the world.
The Sea Gypsies	1978	Family	Two girls and their father embark on an around-the-world sail.
The Riddle of the Sands	1979	Drama	A pair of 1901 yachtsmen discover a sinister plot.
Summer Rental	1985	Comedy	Jack Chester (John Candy) challenges an obnoxious sailing champ to a race while on a family vacation.
One Crazy Summer	1986	Comedy	A romance on Nantucket develops between Hoops McCann (John Cusack) and Cassandra Eldridge (Demi Moore).
Wind	1992	Drama	Matthew Modine stars as the skipper of an America's Cup yacht.
White Squall	1996	Drama	A young crew is taught to sail by Captain Christopher "Skipper" Sheldon (Jeff Bridges) during a harrowing voyage.
Morning Light	2008	Drama	Disney film about a Transpacific Yacht Race.
Charlie St. Cloud	2010	Romantic Drama	A teenager (Zac Efron) who sails must cope with a family tragedy.
Kon-Tiki	2012	Historical drama	New dramatization of Thor Heyerdahl's 1947 adventure.
All Is Lost	2013	Adventure	Robert Redford stars as an unnamed man, lost at sea.
Maidentrip	2014	Documentary	Following Laura Dekker's controversial around the world solo voyage.

== Individual sport ==
=== Bowling ===
Title	Year	Genre	Type	Notes
Strikes and Spares	1934	Short film	Ten-pin	An Oscar-nominated short subject.
Dreamer	1979	Drama	Ten-pin	Tim Matheson stars as a young man whose dream is to become a pro bowler.
Greedy	1994	Comedy	Ten-pin	A struggling PBA Tour bowler (Michael J. Fox) wants his wealthy uncle's money.
Kingpin	1996	Comedy	Ten-pin	Woody Harrelson stars as a bowler with a prosthetic hand who takes an Amish man on the road.
The Big Lebowski	1998	Comedy	Ten-pin	"The Dude" Lebowski, mistaken for a millionaire Lebowski, seeks restitution for his ruined rug and enlists his bowling buddies to help get it.
Alley Cats Strike	2000	Family	Ten-pin	Disney Channel Original Movie about junior high school students.
Crackerjack	2002	Comedy	Bowls	When reluctant bowler Jack Simpson is forced to play to save the club he is a member of it turns out Jack is a natural.
Blackball	2003	Comedy	Bowls	Comedy about a rebellious bowler inspired by Griff Sanders.
A League of Ordinary Gentlemen	2006	Documentary	Ten-pin	Behind-the-scenes look at bowlers at a PBA Tour.
Split	2016	Comedy	Ten-pin	An over-achieving woman with a thing for bowlers decides to marry the man of her dreams in just under a month.

=== Caving ===
Title	Year	Genre	Notes
The Descent	2005	Horror	A caving expedition goes horribly wrong as the explorers become trapped and pursued by predators.
The Cave	2005	Horror	Bloodthirsty creatures await a pack of divers who become trapped in an underwater cave network.
The Descent Part 2	2009	Horror	Sequel to the 2005 film.
Sanctum	2011	Adventure	An underwater team experiences a crisis during an expedition to unexplored cave system.

=== Cue sports ===
Title	Year	Genre	Notes
The Hustler	1961	Drama	An up-and-coming pool hustler (Paul Newman) challenges an established champion (Jackie Gleason).
Billy the Kid and the Green Baize Vampire	1985	Comedy	Musical about snooker.
The Color of Money	1986	Drama	Sequel to The Hustler directed by Martin Scorsese.
Toolsidas Junior	2022	Drama	Indian film about snooker.

=== Fencing ===
Title	Year	Genre	Notes
By the Sword	1991	Drama	A man running a fencing school (Eric Roberts) crosses swords with an ex-convict (F. Murray Abraham).
The Fencing Master	1992	Drama	Spanish film starring Joaquim de Almeida.
The Fencer	2015	Drama	A young Estonian fencer named Endel is forced to return to his homeland, where he begins to train a group of young children in the art of fencing.

=== Figure skating ===
Title	Year	Genre	Notes
One in a Million	1936	Drama	Innkeeper's daughter (Sonja Henie) skates at the 1936 Winter Olympics.
Thin Ice	1937	Romance	Sonja Henie is a ski instructor and skater who falls for a prince.
Happy Landing	1938	Romance	A Norwegian girl meets anNew York bandleader and becomes a skating star.
My Lucky Star	1938	Comedy	A skating star is implicated in a divorce and kicked out of college.
The Ice Follies of 1939	1939	Romance	Careers clash for Ice Follies producer Larry Hall (James Stewart) and actress wife Mary McKay (Joan Crawford).
Everything's on Ice	1939	Drama	A skater's uncle manages her career, then steals her money.
Ice-Capades	1941	Comedy	A promoter (Phil Silvers) passes off the wrong skater as his new star.
Ice-Capades Revue	1942	Comedy	After a woman (Ellen Drew) inherits a skating troupe, a gangster tries to ruin her.
Iceland	1942	Musical	A skater from Iceland falls for a U.S. Marine (John Payne).
Wintertime	1943	Comedy	A Norwegian girl (Henie) must wed an American to skate in New York.
Lady, Let's Dance	1944	Musical	Figure skater Belita joins a California dancing act.
Lake Placid Serenade	1944	Drama	After the invasion of her homeland, a Czech skater (Vera Ralston) comes to the U.S.
It's a Pleasure!	1945	Comedy	A suspended hockey player becomes a comedy act for an ice revue.
Suspense	1946	Film noir	An ice-skating revue's star (Belita) is torn between two men.
Spring on Ice	1951	Musical	Austrian film featuring 1948 Winter Olympics runner-up Eva Pawlik.
Ice Castles	1978	Romance	Lynn-Holly Johnson stars as a figure skater who is left blind after a serious injury.
Champions: A Love Story	1979	Romance	TV movie about two teens who become romantically involved as they train for a skating championship.
Ice Pawn	1989	Drama	Dan Haggerty's favorite champion of ice skating.
On Thin Ice: The Tai Babilonia Story	1990	Biographical	Fact-based TV film on champion skater's career focusing on her drug abuse and depression.
Carmen on Ice	1990	Performance	Skaters including Katarina Witt are featured performing to Carmen.
The Cutting Edge	1992	Romantic comedy	A hockey player (D.B. Sweeney) becomes an Olympic pairs skater.
Tonya and Nancy: The Inside Story	1994	Biographical	TV film about the Tonya Harding/Nancy Kerrigan saga that happened earlier in the year.
A Promise Kept: The Oksana Baiul Story	1994	Biographical	TV film about Oksana Baiul's rise from orphan to Olympic champion.
Ice Angel	2000	Fantasy	TV film about hockey-playing boy who dies and is reincarnated as a girl figure skater.
On Edge	2004	Mockumentary, comedy	Fake documentary following a local skating competition.
Ice Princess	2005	Family comedy	Michelle Trachtenberg stars as a 17-year-old who spurns Harvard to try figure skating.
Go Figure	2005	Family comedy	TV film of a would-be figure skater who finds she prefers hockey.
The Cutting Edge: Going for the Gold	2006	Romantic drama	Made-for-TV sequel about the offspring of skaters from the 1992 film.
Blades of Glory	2007	Comedy	Rival figure skaters (Will Ferrell and Jon Heder) compete together as the first-ever same-sex skating pair.
The Cutting Edge: Chasing the Dream	2008	Romantic drama	Second sequel to the 1992 film.
Ice Castles	2010	Romantic drama	A remake of the 1978 film.
The Cutting Edge: Fire and Ice	2010	Romantic drama	Third sequel to the 1992 film.
The Diplomat	2013	Documentary	Made for TV as part of ESPN's Nine for IX series. The story of figure skater Katarina Witt, two-time Olympic gold medalist and reluctant pawn of the Cold War.
The Price of Gold	2014	Documentary	Made for TV as part of ESPN's 30 for 30 series. A 20-year retrospective of the 1994 attack on Nancy Kerrigan by associates of Tonya Harding.
I, Tonya	2017	Biographical	Margot Robbie portrays controversial figure skater Tonya Harding.

=== Golf ===
Title	Year	Genre	Notes
Golf Mad	1915	Comedy	Silent film about a man who gets the golfing craze and wreaks havoc with clubs.
Golf	1922	Comedy	A golfer digs holes in his floor and plays indoors, smashing mirrors and vases.
West of Broadway	1926	Comedy	Silent film about Wyoming rancher who sets out to attract tourists to his golf club/resort.
Spring Fever	1927	Comedy	Silent film about a golfer who hopes to marry a rich girl (Joan Crawford).
Love in the Rough	1930	Musical	A sound remake of Spring Fever, with Robert Montgomery and songs.
The Golf Specialist	1930	Comedy	W. C. Fields short subject in which he gives lessons on the game.
Part Time Wife	1930	Romance	A man who loses his golf-loving spouse learns the game so he can play her.
Follow Thru	1930	Musical	A club champion competes with her rival over their handsome instructor.
Follow the Sun	1951	Biographical	Story of success and adversity of Ben Hogan (Glenn Ford).
Pat and Mike	1952	Comedy	Spencer Tracy stars as the new trainer of a great female athlete (Katharine Hepburn).
The Caddy	1953	Comedy	Martin and Lewis golf comedy.
Banning	1967	Drama	A PGA pro (Robert Wagner) banned for cheating gets into debt and a dangerous match.
Once You Kiss a Stranger	1970	Thriller	A pro golfer is menaced by a deranged woman who murders his rival.
Babe	1975	Biographical	TV film on life of Babe Didrikson Zaharias, starring Susan Clark and Alex Karras.
Caddyshack	1980	Comedy	Manic antics at Bushwood Country Club, starring Bill Murray, Chevy Chase and Rodney Dangerfield.
Dorf on Golf	1987	Comedy	Direct-to-video short film. First entry in Dorf series with Tim Conway.
Caddyshack II	1988	Comedy	Sequel to 1980 hit, with Jackie Mason as an insulted guest who decides to buy Bushwood.
Dead Solid Perfect	1988	Drama	Made for TV, based on Dan Jenkins novel.
Dorf's Golf Bible	1988	Comedy	Direct-to-video short film; second in the Dorf series.
Blades	1989	Comedy, Horror	A possessed lawnmower kills professional golfers.
Den ofrivillige golfaren	1991	Comedy	Swedish film
The Man with the Perfect Swing	1995	Comedy, drama	A man tries to get investors to back his concept for a can't-miss golf swing.
Happy Gilmore	1996	Comedy	Adam Sandler as a hockey player who takes up golf.
Tin Cup	1996	Romantic comedy	A driving-range owner (Kevin Costner) qualifies for the U.S. Open.
The Tiger Woods Story	1998	Biography	Tiger Woods' meteoric rise to the pinnacle of the golfing world
National Lampoon's Golf Punks	1998	Comedy	A washed-up former PGA Tour golfer is given the task of teaching golf to a group of teenaged underachievers.
Miracle on the 17th Green	1999	Drama	A fired middle-aged advertising executive (Robert Urich) tries professional golf.
The Legend of Bagger Vance	2000	Drama	Period piece about a golfer (Matt Damon) in a match against Bobby Jones and Walter Hagen.
A Gentleman's Game	2002	Drama	A young man (Mason Gamble) gets golf and life lessons at a country club.
Par 6	2002	Comedy, drama	Family members construct a golf course, fulfilling their deceased father's dream.
Birdie & Bogey	2004	Drama	Janine Turner portrays a doomed girl who caddies for her dad.
Bobby Jones: Stroke of Genius	2004	Biographical	Life and career of Bobby Jones, starring James Caviezel.
The Greatest Game Ever Played	2005	Biographical	Story of young Francis Ouimet, played by Shia LaBeouf, and his victory in 1913 U.S. Open, which led to major golf boom in U.S.
Who's Your Caddy?	2007	Comedy	Big Boi, Lil Wayne and friends at the golf course.
Fairway to Heaven	2007	Comedy	A former hot-shot junior golfer still dreams of becoming famous.
The Back Nine	2009	Documentary	True story of a man's dream to become a professional golfer.
Hole in One	2010	Comedy	Farce about a young man who joins women's golf tour.
Golf in the Kingdom	2011	Drama	A mystical figure from India teaches a golfer spirituality.
Seven Days in Utopia	2011	Drama	Christian-themed story of young golfer (Lucas Black) and the many lessons he learns.
From the Rough	2011	Biographical	Taraji P. Henson stars as Catana Starks, the first woman to coach a men's college team—at a historically black school with no tradition in the sport.
Arthur Newman	2012	Drama	A failed pro golfer (Colin Firth) fakes his own death, starts a new life.
Becoming Redwood	2012	Drama	A man fantasizes of beating Jack Nicklaus in the 1975 Masters.
The Short Game	2013	Documentary	Profiles eight entrants in a 2012 U.S. golf competition for 7- and 8-year-olds.
Seve	2014	Biographical	Spanish film charting the life of Seve Ballesteros.
Hit It Hard	2016	Documentary	Made for TV as a part of ESPN's 30 for 30 series. Examines the rise of John Daly from obscurity to win two major championships and his fall back to mediocrity.
Tommy's Honour	2016	Biographical	Examines the lives and careers of father-and-son golf pioneers Old Tom and Young Tom Morris.
Freaky Ali	2016	Comedy, drama	Based on the 1996 American comedy film, Happy Gilmore. In this movie main actor is Not awazuddin Siddiqui
The Phantom of the Open	2021	Biographical, comedy, drama	Amateur golfer Maurice Flifcroft poses as a professional to compete in the 1976 Open Championship qualification round.
Happy Gilmore 2	2025	Comedy	Sequel to Happy Gilmore. Adam Sandler's title character returns to professional golf.

=== Gymnastics ===
Title	Year	Genre	Notes
Nadia	1984	Drama	Biographical film on Nadia Comăneci.
American Anthem	1986	Drama	Starring former Olympian Mitch Gaylord.
Flying	1986	Drama	After a car crash, a gymnast attempts a comeback. Featuring Keanu Reeves.
Perfect Body	1997	Drama	A young female gymnast develops an eating disorder.
Stick It	2006	Comedy, drama	Jeff Bridges as a girls' gym coach.
Peaceful Warrior	2006	Drama	A mysterious spiritual guide (Nick Nolte) advises a college gymnast.
An American Girl: McKenna Shoots for the Stars	2012	Family drama	Young schoolgirl McKenna Brooks aims for the 2016 Summer Olympics.
Full Out	2015	Biographical	TV family film about the gymnast Ariana Berlin.
The Bronze	2015	Comedy	A has-been Olympian turns to drugs, theft and desperation.
Chalk It Up	2016	Comedy	Lovestruck college girl becomes a gymnast to impress a rugby player.

=== Hiking ===
Title	Year	Genre	Notes
Gerry	2002	Drama	Fictional story of hikers (Matt Damon, Casey Affleck) who become hopelessly lost.
127 Hours	2010	Biographical drama	Aron Ralston (portrayed by James Franco) gets trapped by a boulder while canyoneering.
Wild	2014	Biographical drama	Depicting a lone woman's (Reese Witherspoon) 1,000-mile trek through Pacific Crest Trail.

=== Mountaineering and climbing ===
Title	Year	Genre	Discipline	Notes
Gateway of the Caucasus	1931	Documentary	Mountain climbing	An intrepid band of climbers make it their goal in life to scale the lofty Kazbak and return from it safely.
The White Tower	1950	Drama	Mountain climbing	In the Swiss Alps, a woman is determined to make a climb where her father was killed.
Third Man on the Mountain	1959	Drama	Mountain climbing	A Walt Disney tale of a Swiss man's perilous experience on the Citadel.
The Eiger Sanction	1975	Drama	Mountain climbing	A fictional thriller about a paid assassin (Clint Eastwood) on a treacherous Eiger climb.
K2	1991	Biographical, drama	Mountain climbing	Loosely based on real events, a pair of weekend-climber Americans join a team scaling the second-highest peak on Earth.
Vertical Limit	2000	Drama	Mountain climbing	A retired climber's sister makes an attempt to reach the top of K2.
Touching the Void	2003	Documentary	Mountain climbing	True story about a harrowing 1985 expedition in the Andes.
To the Limit	2007	Documentary	Rock climbing	A German-made documentary chronicling an adventure in Yosemite National Park.
The Climb	2007	Documentary	Mountain climbing	A Canadian returns to Mount Everest 25 years after a life-altering experience there.
North Face	2008	Drama	Mountain climbing	Based on a 1936 climb up the Eiger's north face that ended disastrously.
The Wildest Dream	2010	Documentary	Mountain climbing	The famed George Mallory's 1924 disappearance from Mount Everest is recounted.
The Summit	2012	Documentary	Mountain climbing	An account of the lives impacted by the 2008 K2 disaster.
Everest	2015	Drama	Mountain climbing	Story of the 1996 Mount Everest disaster.
Meru	2015	Documentary	Mountain climbing	Chronicles the first ascent of "The Shark's Fin", a famously difficult route to the summit of Meru Peak in the Indian Himalayas.
Poorna: Courage Has No Limit	2017	Biographical	Mountain climbing	Hindi-language film about Malavath Purna, a girl from a tribal background in South India who became the youngest girl to reach the summit of Mount Everest.
Free Solo	2018	Documentary	Rock climbing	A chronicle of Alex Honnold's 2017 ascent of El Capitan, the first ever accomplished as a free solo. Oscar for Best Documentary Feature.

=== Rollerblading ===
Title	Year	Genre	Notes
Airborne	1993	Comedy	A Cincinnati kid becomes a star in inline skating.
Brink!	1998	Family	Disney Channel Original Movie story about rival California skaters.

=== Roller skating ===
Title	Year	Genre	Notes
The Rink	1916	Comedy	A 24-minute silent film starring Charlie Chaplin as a waiter who becomes a skater.
The Fireball	1950	Drama	Mickey Rooney becomes a sensational skater, only to be stricken with polio.
Derby	1971	Documentary	An inside look at professionals like Charlie O'Connell and Ann Calvello.
Kansas City Bomber	1972	Drama	Roller derby story starring Raquel Welch that ends in a one-on-one race versus her nemesis.
Unholy Rollers	1972	Drama	A girl quits her job in a cannery to become a roller derby skater.
Skatetown, U.S.A.	1979	Drama	L.A. skaters including Ace Johnson (Patrick Swayze) compete in a contest for prize money.
Roller Boogie	1979	Romance	Terry Barkley (Linda Blair) skates in a California disco while her boyfriend aims for the Olympics.
Roll Bounce	2005	Family	A group of disadvantaged youths in 1970s Chicago enter a roller disco competition at the ritzy uptown rink.
Hell on Wheels	2007	Documentary	Austin, Texas women try to revive roller derby for the 21st century.
Whip It	2009	Comedy, drama	A young woman (Elliot Page) tries her luck at Roller Derby.
Hawaa Hawaai	2014	Drama	Starring Partho Gupte and Saqib Saleem.

=== Shooting ===
Title	Year	Genre	Notes
Double Tap	2000	Action	
Triple Tap	2010	Action	

=== Skateboarding ===
Title	Year	Genre	Notes
Skaterdater	1965	Drama	Palme d'Or for Best Short Film, 1966 Cannes Film Festival.
Skateboard: The Movie	1978	Drama	Features world champion skateboarder Tony Alva.
Skateboard Madness	1980	Comedy	A reporter too laid-back for his own good is told his last chance is a story on skateboarding
Thrashin'	1986	Drama	Josh Brolin clashes with a punk skateboard gang.
The Search for Animal Chin	1987	Documentary, drama	
Gleaming the Cube	1989	Action, drama	Features Tony Hawk in a small role.
Dogtown and Z-Boys	2001	Documentary	Directed by Stacy Peralta, one of the original Z-Boys featured in the film.
Grind	2003	Comedy	Four school friends try to impress a skateboard pro.
Stoked	2003	Documentary	Mark "Gator" Rogowski goes from skateboard legend to rapist and murderer.
Lords of Dogtown	2005	Drama	A fictionalized version of many of the events that occurred in Dogtown and Z-Boys.
Under the Influence	2005	Documentary	21st-century pool skateboarding in Southern California.
A Badlands Adventure	2009	Documentary	More about pool skateboarding.
Welcome to Ridiculous	2009	Documentary	More about pool skateboarding.
Street Dreams	2009	Drama	Chicago street kid (Paul Rodriguez) becomes a skateboard star.
Skate Kitchen	2018	Drama	A teenage girl befriends a group of female skateboarders in New York City.
Mid90s	2018	Drama	A coming-of-age story set in 1990s Los Angeles.

=== Skiing ===
Title	Year	Genre	Notes
The White Ecstasy	1931	Drama	Leni Riefenstahl portrays a young woman learning how to ski.
Ski Patrol	1940	Drama	Rivals from the 1936 Winter Olympics end up at odds in time of war.
Sun Valley Serenade	1941	Romance	Sonja Henie falls in love on the ski slopes of Idaho.
Two-Faced Woman	1941	Romance	Ski instructor (Greta Garbo) and twin sister pursue a fashion magazine editor.
Water Trix	1948	Short film	Oscar-nominated short by Pete Smith on water ski champ Preston Peterson.
Ski Party	1965	Comedy	Todd Armstrong (Frankie Avalon) and Craig Gamble (Dwayne Hickman) go to Idaho lodge disguised as women.
Ski Fever	1966	Romance	Brian Davis (Martin Milner) competes on skis and for a girl (Claudia Martin).
Downhill Racer	1969	Drama	A self-involved skier (Robert Redford) qualifies for the U.S. Olympic team.
Snow Job	1972	Action	Jean-Claude Killy stars as a thief who robs a ski resort.
The Other Side of the Mountain	1975	Biographical	An accident leaves Olympic-bound slalom skier Jill Kinmont paralyzed.
Copper Mountain	1983	Comedy	Bobby Todd (Jim Carrey) and Jackson Reach (Alan Thicke) go after fun and women in Colorado.
Hot Dog…The Movie	1984	Comedy	Romance and hijinks at a freestyle competition in Squaw Valley.
Going for the Gold: The Bill Johnson Story	1985	Biographical	TV film with Anthony Edwards as 1984 Olympic downhill gold medalist Bill Johnson.
Better Off Dead	1985	Comedy	A teen skier has to deal with his girlfriend dumping him and family issues.
Fire and Ice	1986	Action	German film, narrated in English by John Denver.
Ski School	1990	Comedy	Pals play pranks on one another at a ski school.
Aspen Extreme	1993	Action, drama	Two friends from Michigan move to Colorado to become ski instructors.
Ski School 2	1994	Comedy	When a ski instructor learns his ex-girlfriend is getting married, he returns to ski school to stop it.
Steep	2007	Documentary	A behind-the-scenes look at extreme skiing.
Frozen	2010	Thriller	Horror story set at a New England ski resort.
Truth in Motion	2010	Documentary	Contenders prepare for the 2010 Winter Olympics in Vancouver.
Molly's Game	2018	Drama	Former skier becomes an illegal gambling mogul.

=== Ski jumping ===
Title	Year	Genre	Notes
The Great Ecstasy of Woodcarver Steiner	1974	Documentary	German film made by acclaimed director Werner Herzog.
Matti	2006	Drama	Biographical film based on the life and career of Matti Nykänen.
Eddie the Eagle	2016	Biographical	Story of a hapless British ski jumper from 1988 Calgary Olympics.

=== Snowboarding ===
Title	Year	Genre	Notes
Snowboard Academy	1996	Comedy	A slapstick farce starring Jim Varney and Corey Haim.
Johnny Tsunami	1999	Comedy	TV film
Out Cold	2001	Comedy	Mountain misadventures of mischievous boys in Alaska.
MXP: Most Xtreme Primate	2003	Comedy	A direct-to-video sequel to MVP: Most Valuable Primate, with the title chimpanzee now snowboarding in Colorado.
The White Album	2004	Documentary	Behind-the-scenes look at Olympic gold medalist Shaun White.
First Descent	2005	Documentary	A look at the sport's origins, filmed mainly in Alaska.
White Air	2007	Drama	
Switch	2007	Drama	Norwegian film
Shred	2008	Comedy	Two washed up snowboarders go up against a sleazy corporate snowboard rep.
Snow Summit Showdown	2009	Comedy	
Chalet Girl	2011	Romantic Comedy	A British girl (Felicity Jones) goes to the Alps and discovers snowboarding.
The Art of Flight	2011	Documentary	Footage of top snowboarders including Travis Rice.
The Crash Reel	2013	Documentary	Documents the epic rivalry between half-pipe legends Shaun White and Kevin Pearce.

=== Sumo wrestling ===
Title	Year	Genre	Notes
Wakanohana monogatari dohyou no oni	1956		
Wakanohana monogatari dohyou no oni	1992		
Sumo Do, Sumo Don't	1992	Comedy	
Sumo Bruno	2000	Comedy, drama	
Sumolah	2007	Comedy	
A Matter of Size	2009	Comedy	

=== Surfing ===
Title	Year	Genre	Notes
Gidget	1959	Romantic comedy	A 17-year-old California girl (Sandra Dee) is introduced to surfing and the guys who do it.
Beach Party	1963	Comedy	Surfer Frankie (Frankie Avalon) tries to succeed on his board and with Annette Funicello, too.
The Endless Summer	1966	Documentary	Follows Mike Hynson and Robert August on a trip around the world, plus other prominent surfers.
Big Wednesday	1978	Drama	Leroy (Gary Busey) and Matt (Jan-Michael Vincent) as California surfers during the Vietnam War years.
North Shore	1987	Action	Arizona boy moves to Hawaii in attempt to become a pro surfer.
Back to the Beach	1987	Comedy	Annette (Annette Funicello) and Frankie (Frankie Avalon) reunited for one more beach movie.
Surf Nazis Must Die	1987	Comedy	Nonsense about rival surf gangs feuding in earthquake-struck California.
A Scene at the Sea	1991	Drama	Japanese film about a trash collector learning how to surf.
Point Break	1991	Action	Crime caper about FBI agent (Keanu Reeves) and bank-robbing surfer (Patrick Swayze).
Surf Ninjas	1993	Comedy	Teen surfers from L.A. discover they are actually Asian princes at war with Colonel Chi (Leslie Nielsen).
The Endless Summer II	1994	Documentary	Pat O'Connell and Robert "Wingnut" Weaver retrace steps of Hynson and August from Endless Summer.
Blue Juice	1995	Drama	Romance with Sean Pertwee, Ewan McGregor, Catherine Zeta-Jones.
In God's Hands	1998	Action drama	Teen boys travel thousands of miles seeking the ultimate wave.
7 Girls	2001	Documentary	Focuses on the surfing lives of seven prominent female surfers.
Blue Crush	2002	Drama	A young woman surfs Oahu's North Shore, meets a Pro Bowl football player.
Step into Liquid	2003	Documentary	Director Dana Brown explores sport's evolution since his dad's Endless Summer II, including tow-in surfing.
Riding Giants	2004	Documentary	A historical overview of the sport, focusing primarily on big wave surfing.
Surf's Up	2007	Comedy	Animated mockumentary
Shelter	2007	Drama	Gay men meet, surf and hope to live together as a family.
Surfwise	2008	Documentary	Life of the Paskowitz family.
Surfer, Dude	2009	Comedy	Steve Addington (Matthew McConaughey) impatiently waits for a big wave to come along.
Blue Crush 2	2010	Drama	Sequel to 2002 film with all-new cast surfing in South Africa.
Soul Surfer	2011	Drama	Biographical film on the life of Bethany Hamilton.
Chasing Mavericks	2012	Drama	Biographical film on the life of Jay Moriarity.
Hawaiian: Legend of Eddie Aikau	2013	Documentary	Made for TV as part of ESPN's 30 for 30 series. Biographical film on big-wave surfer Eddie Aikau, whose death inspired a spiritual movement.
Drift	2013	Drama	Australian film about 1970s surfing innovators, starring Sam Worthington.
Surf's Up 2: WaveMania	2017	Comedy	Sequel to Surf's Up, where Codey and friends team up with the stars of WWE to surf on Palisade.
Unstoppable	2018	Documentary	A more recent examination of Bethany Hamilton's life, from childhood to shark attack victim, professional surfer, wife, and mother.

=== Swimming and diving ===
Title	Year	Genre	Notes
Swim Girl, Swim	1927	Comedy	A timid miss (Bebe Daniels) swims English Channel and meets Gertrude Ederle.
You Said a Mouthful	1932	Comedy	An "unsinkable" swimsuit inventor enters a race to impress a girl (Ginger Rogers).
Bathing Beauty	1944	Comedy	A college swim coach (Esther Williams) finds out her husband-to-be is already married.
This Time for Keeps	1947	Romance	Aquacade performer falls for a young soldier returning from the war.
Million Dollar Mermaid	1952	Musical	Based on the true story of Australia swimmer Annette Kellerman.
Dangerous When Wet	1953	Musical	A dairy farmer's daughter (Esther Williams) tries to swim the English Channel.
Star Spangled Girl	1971	Romance	A swimmer training for the Olympics (Sandy Duncan) reluctantly falls in love.
Vsyo reshayet mgnoveniye	1978	Drama	
Dawn!	1979	Biographical	Biopic of Australian swimmer Dawn Fraser, a 3-time Olympic gold medalist.
Popcorn & Paprika	1984	Comedy	
Koni	1984	Drama	Bengali film based on Moti Nandi's novel.
Back to School	1986	Comedy	A diver's rich dad (Rodney Dangerfield) returns to college and ends up competing himself.
Campus Man	1987	Comedy	A college business major convinces a diver to pose for a beefcake calendar.
Diving In	1990	Drama	Olympic coach (Kristy Swanson) trains teen diver who's afraid of heights.
Sarahsarà	1994	Drama	
Breaking the Surface: The Greg Louganis Story	1997	Biographical	Story of Olympic gold-medal diver Greg Louganis, played by Mario Lopez.
The Princess & the Barrio Boy	2000	Drama	
Waterboys	2001	Comedy	A Japanese film about synchronised swimming.
Heart: The Marilyn Bell Story	2001	Biographical	Story of 16-year-old Marilyn Bell's world-record swim across Lake Ontario (50.5 km) from New York, USA to Ontario, Canada
Swimfan	2002	Thriller	A swimmer's lover (Erika Christensen) feels rejected, begins to stalk him.
Swimming Upstream	2003	Drama	Fact-based story of Tony Fingleton, an Australian who skipped the 1964 Summer Olympics to attend Harvard. Screenplay by Fingleton.
On a Clear Day	2005	Drama	A shipyard worker attempts to swim the English Channel.
The Big Bad Swim	2006	Comedy	Connecticut grown-ups go to a beginner's swim class.
Einfache Leute	2007	Drama	
Pride	2007	Drama	A swim coach (Terrence Howard) confronts racism in 1970s Philadelphia.
Undead Pool	2007	Horror	A Japanese zombie story.
Floating Skyscrapers	2013	Drama	An aspiring professional swimmer falls in love with another man.
Touch the Wall	2014	Documentary	How teenager Missy Franklin took four gold medals at the 2012 Summer Olympics.
Vindication Swim	2024	Drama	Biopic of Mercedes Gleitze, who became the first British woman to swim the English Channel in 1927.
Young Woman and the Sea	2024	Biographical	Biopic of Gertrude "Trudy" Ederle, who became the first woman to swim the English Channel in 1914.

=== Table tennis ===
Title	Year	Genre	Notes
Ping Pong	2002	Comedy, drama	Japanese film about a pair of high school competitors.
Balls of Fury	2007	Comedy	A 12-year-old Olympic hopeful faces criminal mastermind Feng (Christopher Walken).
Ping Pong Playa	2007	Comedy	
As One	2012	Comedy, drama	South Korean film about 1991 championship tournament in Japan.
Top Spin	2014	Documentary	Follows road to 2012 Olympics of American teens Ariel Hsing, Michael Landers and Lily Zhang.
Ping Pong Summer	2014	Comedy	A 13-year-old boy in Maryland finds a mentor to teach him the game.
Marty Supreme	2025	Drama	In the 1950s, Marty Mauser, a wily hustler with a dream no one respects, goes to hell and back in pursuit of greatness. Loosely based on American tennis table player Marty Reisman.

=== Tennis ===
Title	Year	Genre	Notes
Love, Honor and Behave	1938	Drama	A college tennis player prefers sportsmanship to winning at all costs.
Strangers on a Train	1951	Suspense	A pro tries to play in the U.S. Open while being framed for murder. Directed by Alfred Hitchcock.
Hard, Fast and Beautiful	1951	Drama	A young tennis prodigy can't live up to her mother's expectations.
The Christian Licorice Store	1971	Drama	Beau Bridges stars as a tennis pro who can't handle success.
Players	1979	Drama	A love story involving Ali MacGraw and Wimbledon contender Dean Paul Martin.
Racquet	1979	Comedy	A former tennis champ (Bert Convy) sets his sites on owning a tennis court.
Spring Fever	1982	Drama	Las Vegas showgirl's daughter (Carling Bassett) enters a tournament.
Second Serve	1986	Biographical	A television film with Vanessa Redgrave as transgender tennis pro Renée Richards.
Nobody's Perfect	1990	Comedy	A college freshman (Chad Lowe) hot for a female player masquerades as a woman.
The Break	1995	Drama	Vincent Van Patten as a former player turned coach.
When Billie Beat Bobby	2001	Biographical	Docudrama of 1973 Billie Jean King vs. Bobby Riggs match, with Holly Hunter and Ron Silver.
Wimbledon	2004	Romantic comedy	Two players (Kirsten Dunst and Paul Bettany) pursue romance during the Wimbledon Championships.
Tennis no Ōjisama – Futari no Samurai	2005	Action	Japanese film
The Prince of Tennis	2006	Action	Japanese film about a tennis prodigy.
Jelenin Svet	2008	Documentary	A look at career of Serbian pro star Jelena Janković.
Somay Ku: A Uganda Tennis Story	2008	Documentary	
Balls Out: Gary the Tennis Coach	2009	Comedy	Direct-to-video spoof starring Seann William Scott.
Unmatched	2010	Documentary	Made for TV as part of ESPN's 30 for 30 series. Focuses on the Chris Evert–Martina Navratilova rivalry, and on the long-term friendship between the two women.
Renée	2011	Documentary	Made for TV as a follow-up to ESPN's 30 for 30 series. Explores the life of transsexual tennis player Renée Richards and the impact of her entry in the 1977 US Open.
Venus and Serena	2013	Documentary	A behind-the-scenes look at the Williams sisters.
Venus Vs.	2013	Documentary	Made for TV as part of ESPN's Nine for IX series. Examines the fight Venus Williams led to gain prize money equality for women.
Andy Murray: The Man Behind The Racquet	2013	Documentary	A behind-the-scenes BBC look at Andy Murray.
This Is What They Want	2013	Documentary	Made for TV as part of ESPN's 30 for 30 series. A look back at the run of then 39-year-old Jimmy Connors to the semifinals of the 1991 US Open.
Break Point	2015	Comedy	Estranged brothers begin entering pro tournaments in doubles.
7 Days in Hell	2016	Comedy	A mockumentary featuring Andy Samberg in a match that won't end.
Borg vs McEnroe	2017	Biographical	Tennis champion Björn Borg (Sverrir Gudnason) faces off against brash newcomer John McEnroe (Shia LaBeouf) at the 1980 Wimbledon Championships.
Battle of the Sexes	2017	Comedy	Steve Carell and Emma Stone recreate the 1973 Riggs-King match.
King Richard	2021	Biographical	Richard Williams (Will Smith) is father and coach of famed tennis players Venus and Serena Williams.
American Son	2024	Documentary	Made for TV as part of ESPN's 30 for 30 series. Profiles Michael Chang, the US-born son of Taiwanese immigrants, and focuses on the 1989 French Open, in which he became the youngest male player to win a Grand Slam singles title.
Challengers	2024	Drama	A love triangle between a tennis coach (Zendaya), her champion husband (Mike Faist), and her ex-boyfriend still playing on the ATP Challenger circuit (Josh O'Connor).

=== Underwater diving ===
Title	Year	Genre	Notes
The Frogmen	1951	War	Scuba diving experts including Richard Widmark operate as military commandos.
Beneath the 12-Mile Reef	1953	Adventure	Story of sponge divers off the Florida Keys, starring Robert Wagner.
The Silent World	1956	Documentary	Directed by Jacques-Yves Cousteau and Louis Malle.
World Without Sun	1964	Documentary	Directed by Jacques-Yves Cousteau, chronicles Conshelf Two, the first attempt to create an underwater habitat for humans to live on the sea floor.
Voyage to the Edge of the World	1976	Documentary	Directed by Jacques-Yves Cousteau, Philippe Cousteau and Marshall Flaum, chronicles a four months expedition by Cousteau to Antarctica.
The Deep	1977	Adventure	Dangerous men go after scuba divers Nick Nolte and Jacqueline Bisset near Bermuda.
The Big Blue	1988	Drama	French director Luc Besson's story of free divers, starring Jean Reno and Rosanna Arquette.
Ghosts of the Abyss	2003	Documentary	Director James Cameron and crew submerge to explore remains of Titanic.
Open Water	2003	Drama	Director Chris Kentis. The story of the disappearance of scuba divers Tom and Eileen Lonergan in 1998.
The Cave	2005	Horror	Off coast of Romania, spelunkers and divers discover terrifying parasites.
Into the Blue	2005	Adventure	Divers Jessica Alba and Paul Walker find crashed plane transporting cocaine.
Fool's Gold	2008	Adventure	Treasure hunter Matthew McConaughey dives searching for Spanish galleon.
Sanctum	2011	Adventure	An underwater cave diving team experiences a life-threatening crisis during an expedition to the unexplored and least accessible cave system in the world.
No Limits	2013	Documentary	Made for TV as part of ESPN's Nine for IX series. Explores the life of Audrey Mestre, a world-class freediver, and the events leading up to the dive that ultimately took her life.

=== Wrestling ===
Note: Lucha films are not included in this list. Although they feature luchadores (Mexican professional wrestlers) as the lead characters, the luchadores typically portray heroes (often superheroes) within non-wrestling stories (such as action, horror, or sci-fi).

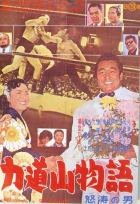
Japanese movie poster for Rikidōzan monogatari: Dotō no otoko (1955)

Title	Year	Genre	Discipline	Notes
Take Down	1979	Comedy, drama	Scholastic wrestling	Lorenzo Lamas stars as a high school wrestler.
Lurich	1984	Drama	Greco-Roman	Biographical film on the career of Georg Lurich.
Vision Quest	1985	Drama	Scholastic	Matthew Modine stars as a high school wrestler.
Over the Top	1987	Drama	Arm wrestling	Truck driver Lincoln "Linc" Hawk (Sylvester Stallone) enters an arm-wrestling competition.
Spooner	1989	Drama	Scholastic	Made for TV, premiered on the Disney Channel, stars Robert Urich.
Reversal	2001	Romantic drama	Scholastic	Story of a Pennsylvania high school athlete.
The Backyard	2002	Documentary	Backyard wrestling	Documentary film examining backyard wrestling.
Going to the Mat	2004	Family comedy	Scholastic	Made for TV, premiered on the Disney Channel, stars Andrew Lawrence.
Personal Effects	2008	Drama	Wrestling	Stars Ashton Kutcher and Michelle Pfeiffer.
The Streak	2008	Documentary	Scholastic	Made-for-TV movie that was included in ESPN's 30 for 30 series. The story of the wrestling program at Brandon High School in Florida and their 439-match winning streak that spanned 3 decades
Legendary	2010	Drama	Scholastic	Oklahoma teen is coached by his older brother (John Cena).
The Hammer	2010	Drama	Collegiate wrestling	Biographical film about a deaf college wrestler.
Win Win	2011	Comedy, drama	Scholastic	Broke lawyer Mike Flaherty (Paul Giamatti) becomes a boy's coach and guardian.
Foxcatcher	2014	Drama	Freestyle wrestling	Channing Tatum in a true story about Olympic wrestler Mark Schultz, his brother Dave, and the events leading up to Dave's murder by their benefactor, John du Pont.
Lost in Wrestling	2015	Drama		
The Prince of Pennsylvania	2015	Documentary	Freestyle	Made for TV as part of ESPN's 30 for 30 series. Another look at the Schultz–du Pont case.
Dangal	2016	Drama	Freestyle	Starring Aamir Khan as Mahavir Singh Phogat, who taught wrestling to his daughters Geeta Phogat and Babita Kumari.
American Wrestler: The Wizard	2016	Drama	Scholastic	In 1980, a teenage Iranian immigrant moves to a California town and joins a high school wrestling team.
Godha	2017	Drama	Freestyle	Starring Renji Panicker as Captain and Wamiqa Gabbi as Aditi Singh.
The Iron Claw	2023	Drama	Wrestling	Biographical film about the sons of Fritz Von Erich achieving success in wrestling
Queen of the Ring	2024	Drama	Wrestling	Biographical film about Mildred Burke.

== Animals in sports ==
=== Fishing ===
Title	Year	Genre	Notes
The Silver Horde	1930	Drama	Boyd Emerson (Joel McCrea), a salmon fisherman, tries to open a cannery.
Tiger Shark	1932	Drama	Fisherman Mike Mascarenhas (Edward G. Robinson) loses a hand saving a man's life.
Riffraff	1936	Romance	Tuna cannery worker Hattie Tuttle (Jean Harlow) falls for fisherman Dutch Muller (Spencer Tracy).
Captains Courageous	1937	Adventure	A spoiled brat ends up with the crew of a fishing schooner.
Spawn of the North	1938	Drama	A seal hunter (George Raft) betrays a pal (Henry Fonda), poaching fish.
Johnny Frenchman	1945	Drama	British film about rival Cornwall fishing families.
Tuna Clipper	1949	Drama	Alec MacLennan (Roddy McDowall) takes a job with a crew of tuna fishermen.
Alaska Seas	1954	Drama	A remake of Spawn of the North with Robert Ryan and Brian Keith.
The Old Man and the Sea	1958	Adventure	After 84 days without a catch, a Cuban fisherman (Spencer Tracy) lands a marlin.
Man's Favorite Sport?	1964	Comedy	A phony fishing expert (Rock Hudson) ends up entered in a big tournament.
Blue Fin	1978	Family	Australian film about a boy who learns tuna fishing.
A River Runs Through It	1992	Drama	Story of Montana brothers hooked on fly-fishing, directed by Robert Redford.
Gone Fishin'	1997	Comedy	Inept anglers Joe Waters (Joe Pesci) and Gus Green (Danny Glover) have an adventure in the Everglades.
Bait Shop	2008	Comedy	A bait shop owner enters a pro fishing tournament to save his store.
The Lost World of Mr. Hardy	2008	Documentary	British film about a family firm that manufactures fishing tackle.
Ondine	2009	Drama	An Irish fisherman (Colin Farrell) catches a woman in his net.
Salmon Fishing in the Yemen	2011	Comedy	A Brit (Ewan McGregor) helps a sheikh introduce salmon fishing to his country.

=== Greyhound racing ===
Title	Year	Genre	Notes
Wild Boy	1934	Comedy	Corrupt dog owner tries to keep Wild Boy out of the Greyhound Derby.
The Gay Dog	1954	Comedy	British film featuring a young Petula Clark.
Jumping for Joy	1956	Comedy	A man nurses a sick greyhound back to health, meets criminals who want to fix a race.
Man About Dog	2004	Comedy	A trio of Irish lads and their greyhound run from a pack of crooks.
The Mighty Celt	2005	Drama	Gillian Anderson stars in a story of Northern Ireland greyhound racing.

=== Jousting ===
Title	Year	Genre	Notes
Knightriders	1981	Drama	King Billy (Ed Harris) leads a band of men who joust on motorcycles.
A Knight's Tale	2001	Adventure	William Thatcher (Heath Ledger) pretends to be a nobleman to compete in jousting tournaments.

=== Polo ===
Title	Year	Genre	Notes
The Smart Set	1928	Drama	An arrogant player is booted from U.S. team before match vs. Great Britain.
Polo Joe	1936	Comedy	Afraid of horses, Joe Bolton (Joe E. Brown) takes up polo to impress a girl.
Mickey's Polo Team	1936	Comedy short	A game between Disney characters, led by Mickey Mouse, and cartoon versions of real-life movie stars.
The Kid from Texas	1939	Comedy	A loudmouth cowpuncher tries his hand at polo.
The Polo Kid	2009	Documentary	True story of how 13-year-old Santiago Torres, from an ordinary background, became a polo star.

=== Rodeo ===
Title	Year	Genre	Notes
The Calgary Stampede	1925	Mystery	After winning a Canada rodeo with a spectacular stunt, Dan (Hoot Gibson) is accused of a murder.
Let 'er Buck	1925	Western	A cowboy hiding in Oregon risks exposure by entering the world rodeo championships.
Wild Horse Rodeo	1937	Western	One of The Three Mesquiteers searches for a horse called Cyclone.
The Cowboy and the Lady	1938	Romance	A socialite from Palm Beach falls for rodeo cowpoke Stretch Willoughby (Gary Cooper).
Ride 'Em Cowboy	1942	Comedy	Duke and Willoughby (Abbott and Costello) rescue kidnapped rodeo rider Bronco Bob.
A Lady Takes a Chance	1943	Comedy	A bronc rider (John Wayne) bucks an Eastern gal's plan to get hitched.
Rodeo King and the Senorita	1951	Western	Rex Allen (Rex Allen) joins a rodeo and tries to solve a murder.
The Lusty Men	1952	Drama	Injured by a bull, a rodeo veteran (Robert Mitchum) quits, then makes an ill-fated comeback.
Rodeo	1952	Drama	Unpaid for a feed bill, Nancy Cartwright takes over a bankrupt rodeo association.
Sky Full of Moon	1952	Comedy	A bronc rider goes to Las Vegas to try to win his rodeo entry fee.
Arena	1953	Drama	Now a rodeo clown, a washed up rider risks his life for one last try.
Born Reckless	1958	Drama	A trick rider (Mamie van Doren) tries to lasso a young cowboy.
The Rounders	1965	Comedy	Ben Jones (Glenn Ford) and Howdy Lewis (Henry Fonda) wager nobody in rodeo can ride their horse.
Tickle Me	1965	Musical	Lonnie Beale (Elvis Presley) works as a singer until rodeo season returns.
Stay Away, Joe	1968	Musical	Cowboys compete to stay aboard Elvis Presley's prize bull.
Junior Bonner	1972	Western	Steve McQueen stars as a rodeo pro with a few family issues. Directed by Sam Peckinpah.
J. W. Coop	1972	Western	A just-out-of-jail bronco buster (Cliff Robertson) resumes his career.
When the Legends Die	1972	Western	Alcoholic cowboy Red Dillon (Richard Widmark) mentors a Ute Indian to compete in rodeo.
Black Rodeo	1972	Documentary	A rodeo comes to Harlem, narrated by Woody Strode.
The Great American Cowboy	1973	Documentary	A documentary about the rivalry between veteran Larry Mahan and newcomer Phil Lyne, as the two vie for the National Finals Rodeo Championship title.
The Electric Horseman	1979	Romance	TV reporter pursues rodeo cowboy (Robert Redford) who steals a valuable horse.
Stir Crazy	1980	Comedy	A prison warden gets innocent inmates (Gene Wilder, Richard Pryor) involved in a rodeo.
Rodeo Girl	1980	Drama	A rider's wife (Katharine Ross) gives rodeo competition a try herself.
My Heroes Have Always Been Cowboys	1991	Drama	Rodeo rider (Scott Glenn) returns home after a long absence.
Colorado Cowboy: The Bruce Ford Story	1993	Documentary	Behind the scenes look at a successful bronco buster.
8 Seconds	1994	Drama	Biographical film on Lane Frost, with Luke Perry starring as doomed bull rider.
The Cowboy Way	1994	Comedy	Cowpokes Sonny Gilstrap (Kiefer Sutherland) and Pepper Lewis (Woody Harrelson) take a trip to New York.
Ruby Jean and Joe	1996	Drama	A female hitchhiker befriends a former rodeo rider played by Tom Selleck.
Everything That Rises	1998	Drama	Dennis Quaid directs and stars in TV film about a Texas cowboy.
Cowboy Up	2001	Romance	Bull rider Hank Braxton (Kiefer Sutherland) falls for barrel racer Celia Jones (Daryl Hannah).
The Ride	2010	Documentary	Explores a season on the Professional Bull Riders' top circuit.
Cowgirls 'n Angels	2012	Family	A 12-year-old girl teams up with a rodeo owner (James Cromwell).
The Longest Ride	2015	Drama	Injured bull rider (Scott Eastwood) befriends an aging artist (Alan Alda).

== Other ==
Title	Year	Genre	Sport	Notes
Flight of the Dream Team	1988	Documentary	Skydiving	A silent skydiving documentary directed by Guy Manos and cinematographed by Norman A. Kent. An excerpt was used as a video test for the software XingMPEG Player in the 1990s.
Babe	1995	Comedy	Sheepdog trail	Based on the book The Sheep-Pig by Dick King Smith, nominated for Best Picture at the 68th Academy Awards.
Cool Runnings	1993	Comedy	Bobsleigh	Loosely based on the debut of the Jamaica bobsled team at the 1988 Winter Olympics.
Dodgeball: A True Underdog Story	2004	Comedy	Dodgeball	Farce about big-time dodgeball, starring Vince Vaughn and Ben Stiller as rival players.
The Game Changers	2018	Documentary	All sports	American documentary film about vegan athletes who follow plant-based diets.
Paper Planes	2015	Drama	Paper aeroplane racing	The film tells a story about Dylan, a young boy who lives in Australia, who finds out that he has a talent for making paper planes and dreams of competing in the World Paper Plane Championships in Japan.
Populaire	2013	Comedy, drama	Speed typing	A provincial girl guided by her coach becomes the fastest typist.
Like a Virgin	2006	Comedy	Ssireum	A transgender Korean competes in ssireum (traditional Korean folk wrestling).
Tag	2018	Comedy	Tag	Three friends who spend one month a year playing tag.
The Good, the Bad, the Hungry	2019	Documentary	Competitive eating	Made for TV as a part of ESPN's 30 for 30 series. Explores the longstanding rivalry between competitive eaters Takeru Kobayashi and Joey Chestnut.
Darts	2024	Documentary	Darts	focuses on the Professional Darts Corporation and its players.
Damaru Ko Dandibiyo	2018	Romantic comedy	Dandi biyo	A Nepali film starring Khagendra Lamichhane about a dandi biyo (gillidanda) league in the hills of Nepal.

=== E-sports ===
Title	Year	Genre	Notes
Beyond the Game	2008	Documentary	About the world of professional video gaming, particularly of the game Warcraft III: The Frozen Throne.
Ecstasy of Order: The Tetris Masters	2011	Documentary	A story of the lives of several gamers from around the country as they prepare to compete in the 2010 Classic Tetris World Championship in Los Angeles.
Gamer	2011		The story of a young gamer who lives with his mother in Simferopol.
Free to Play	2014	Documentary	The film follows Benedict "hyhy" Lim, Danil "Dendi" Ishutin, and Clinton "Fear" Loomis, three professional Dota 2 players who participated in the first International, the most lucrative esports tournament at the time.
The King of Arcades	2014	Documentary	The film follows punk rock musician and classic arcade collector Richie Knucklez on his journey to cultural prominence when he takes his passion for collecting to new heights by opening an arcade business in Flemington, New Jersey, only to watch it fall in the wake of economic hardship.
The King of Kong: A Fistful of Quarters	2007	Documentary	Follows Steve Wiebe in his attempts to take the high score record for the 1981 arcade game Donkey Kong from Billy Mitchell.
The Lost Arcade	2015	Documentary	About the influence of the Chinatown Fair arcade on the fighting game community and New York City as a whole.
Man vs Snake	2015	Documentary	Film follows players as they try to accumulate a billion points on the 1982 arcade game Nibbler, a feat first achieved by Tim McVey in 1984.
Ready Player One	2018	Sci-fi	Based on the book of the same name.

=== Fictional sports ===
Title	Year	Genre	Notes
Rollerball	1975	Sci-fi	James Caan stars as the game's greatest star, playing for Houston in a futuristic story of a life-and-death sport.
BASEketball	1998	Comedy	A league is formed featuring a new game that combines baseball and basketball.
Rollerball	2002	Sci-fi	A remake of the 1975 sci-fi film starring LL Cool J and Chris Klein.

=== Multiple sport movies ===
Note: This category is for films about sports in general or films about athletes participating in multiple sports. This category is not for films featuring the Olympics, Paralympics, X Games and other similar "games" which fall under the "Multi-sport games/Olympics" category. Films featuring specific sports should be listed under that specific sport.

Title	Year	Genre	Notes
Jim Thorpe – All-American	1951	Biographical	Story of famed Native American athlete who excelled at football, baseball and track & field, starring Burt Lancaster.
June 17th, 1994	2010	Documentary	Made for TV as a part of ESPN's 30 for 30 series. Examines the sporting events of the day in question, among them the opening of the FIFA World Cup, the NBA Finals, the last U.S. Open round of Arnold Palmer, and the New York Rangers' Stanley Cup celebration—all overshadowed by O. J. Simpson's run from the police.
The Dotted Line	2011	Documentary	Part of ESPN Films Collection - The Dotted Line is an in-depth look at what it takes to be a big-time agent in the fiercely competitive world of major league sports.
Broke	2012	Documentary	Made for TV as a part of ESPN's 30 for 30 series examining pro athletes propensity to waste their millions
Head Games	2012	Documentary	Athletes from the professional to the youth levels share their personal struggles dealing with concussions
Branded	2013	Documentary	Made for TV as part of ESPN's Nine for IX series. A thought provoking look at the double standard placed on female athletes to be the best players on the field/courts and the sexiest off them
Let Them Wear Towels	2013	Documentary	Made for TV as part of ESPN's Nine for IX series. Examines the obstacles that women sports journalists faced as they fought to gain access to the "boys' club" of male locker rooms
Schooled: The Price of College Sports	2013	Documentary	Examines the billion-dollar enterprise of college sports built on the backs of unpaid student athletes.
Equestria Girls	2015	Musical	Made for TV, a My Little Pony: Friendship is Magic spin-off film about two schools and a "Friendship Games".
Point Break	2015	Action, drama	A young FBI agent infiltrates an extraordinary team of extreme sports athletes he suspects of masterminding a string of corporate heists. A remake of the 1991 film of the same name
Believeland	2016	Documentary	Made for TV as part of ESPN's 30 for 30 series. Follows the history of sports in Cleveland since the city's last major title in 1964, including heartbreaks such as The Drive, The Fumble, The Shot, The Move, and The Decision. Airings after the Cavaliers won the NBA title in 2016 include a new ending.
Student Athlete	2018	Documentary	HBO made-for-TV documentary, produced by LeBron James and Maverick Carter, criticizing the NCAA for alleged exploitation of college athletes.
Deion's Double Play	2019	Documentary	Entry in ESPN's 30 for 30 series focusing on Deion Sanders, specifically a 24-hour period in 1992 when he played in two Major League Baseball postseason games and an NFL game in cities separated by 1,000 miles.

=== Multi-sport games/Olympics ===
Note: Films featuring the Olympics, Paralympics, X Games, and other similar events are included. Films featuring specific sports featured in the games should be listed under that specific sport

Title	Year	Genre	Notes
Spartakiada	1929	Documentary	Silent propaganda piece recapping athletic competitions held in Moscow in 1928.
Charlie Chan at the Olympics	1937	Mystery	Charlie Chan's oldest son is chosen to compete in the 1936 Summer Olympics.
Olympia Part 1: Festival of Nations	1938	Documentary	Leni Reifenstahl's Nazi propaganda film chronicling the 1936 Summer Olympics.
Olympia Part 2: Festival of Beauty	1938	Documentary	Leni Reifenstahl's Nazi propaganda film chronicling the 1936 Summer Olympics.
Kings of the Olympics	1948	Documentary	American film mostly culled from Olympia, Riefenstahl film on 1936 Summer Olympics.
Olympia 52	1952	Documentary	French film about 1952 Summer Olympics in Helsinki, Finland.
Geordie	1955	Comedy	A not-so-wee Scot goes to Australia for the 1956 Summer Olympics.
The Grand Olympics	1961	Documentary	A look back at the 1960 Summer Olympics in Rome.
Tokyo Olympiad	1965	Documentary	A look back at the 1964 Summer Olympics in Japan.
13 jours en France	1968	Documentary	A documentary about the 1968 Winter Olympics in Grenoble.
The Olympics in Mexico	1969	Documentary	A documentary highlighting the 1968 Summer Olympics in Mexico City.
Visions of Eight	1973	Documentary	Eight directors' takes on 1972 Summer Olympics in Munich.
White Rock	1977	Documentary	A look at 1976 Winter Olympics held in Innsbruck, Austria.
A Step Away	1980	Documentary	Footage from 1979 Pan American Games in Puerto Rico, narrated by Orson Welles.
Animalympics	1980	Comedy	The animal kingdom stages its own Summer Olympics.
The Golden Moment	1980	Drama	TV movie on American and Russian athletes at Moscow Olympics who fall in love.
Stade 81 a.k.a. Starting Blocks	1981	Documentary	A short film documentary about the first Special Olympics.
The First Olympics: Athens 1896	1984	Drama	TV mini-series about the origins of the Modern Olympics.
16 Days of Glory	1986	Documentary	Official documentary of the 1984 Summer Olympics in Los Angeles.
Dorf and the First Games of Mount Olympus	1988	Comedy	Direct-to-video short with Tim Conway, parody of Ancient Olympic Games.
Fire, Ice and Dynamite	1990	Action	A tycoon fakes suicide and his children and creditors compete for his estate in Olympic-type events.
Izzy's Quest for Olympic Gold	1995	Animated	TV special starring Izzy, the mascot of the 1996 Summer Olympics, as he works to earn all five Olympic Rings and compete in the games.
One Day in September	1999	Documentary	A documentary chronicling the Munich Massacre at the 1972 Summer Olympics in Munich.
Asterix at the Olympic Games	2008	Comedy	French film in which characters from Astérix comic book series participate in Olympics.
Dream Weavers: Beijing 2008	2008	Documentary	Official documentary about events building up to 2008 Summer Olympics.
Olympic Pride, American Prejudice	2016	Documentary	The story of the "forgotten" 17 African-American athletes that participated at the Berlin 1936 Summer Olympics, along with Jesse Owens.

== See also ==
- List of highest-grossing sports films
- List of films based on sports books
- List of sports video games
