= On Any Sunday: Motocross, Malcolm, & More =

2001 film by Dana Brown

- Directed by: Dana Brown
- Written by: Dana Brown
- Produced by: Dana Brown
- Edited by: Dana Brown
- Music by: Wade Brown
- Release date: 2001
- Running time: 55 minutes
- Language: English

On Any Sunday: Motocross, Malcolm, & More is a 2001 documentary film directed by Dana Brown of Step Into Liquid and Dust to Glory fame. The film is about one of the most famous films about motorcycle sport, On Any Sunday (1971), which was directed by Brown's father Bruce Brown.
