= Highwater (film) =

- Directed by: Dana Brown
- Written by: Dana Brown
- Produced by: Wes Brown; Johnathan Dorfman; Temple Fennell; Stephen Hays; C. Rich Wilson; Robert Youngs
- Cinematography: J. Steven Matzinger
- Edited by: Dana Brown; Wes Brown
- Music by: Switchfoot
- Release date: August 1, 2008
- Running time: 97 minutes
- Country: United States
- Language: English

Highwater is a 2008 documentary film centered on surfing's Triple Crown competitions, the professional surfing tour's final three competitions held each year on the North Shore of Oahu. The film is directed by Dana Brown, son of famed surfer and filmmaker Bruce Brown.

== Background ==
Starting on Halloween and ending around Christmas, the competition attracts the sport's best surfers to Oahu's North Shore, known for its large waves. The Vans Triple Crown attracts for world class surfers and amateur surfers.

== Plot ==
Real life drama, humor, death-defying waves, rivalries, parties, heart-break, romance, injuries, and humanity all collide during the nearly two-month competition on Hawaii's 7 Mile Miracle. The film follows multiple story lines over the course of the entire competition, taking the real-life events to construct a moving story.

== Featured surfers ==
- Kelly Slater
- Sunny Garcia
- Andy Irons
- Layne Beachley
- Rochelle Ballard
- Mark Healy
- Pat O'Connell
- Rob Machado
- John John Florence
- Bruce Irons
- Chelsea Georgeson
- Jesse Billauer
- Danny Fuller
- Lisa Anderson
- Bruce Brown

== Release ==
The film had its debut in August 2008 at the Surfing Heritage Foundation facility in San Clemente, California. The world premiere was held at the Santa Monica Pier on May 22, 2009 in celebrations of the pier's 100th anniversary. Proceeds from the ticket sales went to help restoration of the pier.
