= The Sandals =

American surf rock band

- Also known as: The Twangs, The Sandells
- Origin: San Clemente, California, United States
- Genres: Surf rock
- Years active: 1962–1967
- Label: World Pacific
- Past members: Gaston Georis; Walter Georis; Danny Brawner; John Blakeley; David Blakeley; John Gibson
- Website: http://thesandals.com/

The Sandals, also known as the Sandells, were an early, influential surf music band formed in 1962. They are most famous for scoring the surfing documentary The Endless Summer.

== History ==
The Sandals began in 1962, when Danny Brawner, a drummer, joined a high-school group called The Twangs, headed up by the brothers Gaston and Walter Georis. The Twangs were a group heavily influenced by The Ventures. At this point, the core of the Sandals was formed: Brawner on drums, Gaston on keyboards, Walter on rhythm guitar, John Blakeley on lead guitar with his brother, David, on bass. David was replaced by John Gibson early on. The band changed their name to The Shadows, and eventually settled on the Sandells, a portmanteau of "Sand" and "ells", a popular ending for groups at the time. They released their first album, Scrambler!, in early 1964. They partnered with World Pacific Records for the release, which allowed them to come in contact with Bruce Brown, who was then just beginning editing work on his next documentary project, The Endless Summer.

Brawner and the Georis brothers met with Brown in Long Beach at a surf fair, hoping to sell him one of the Sandals songs for use on Brown's new film. Brown, however, was so impressed by their music that he agreed to use a number of their songs in the film. It was agreed that all film profit would go to Brown, and all soundtrack profit to go to the Sandells. The group used the studio time that working on the film gave them to release a number of LPs and Singles during this period. Jim King worked with the group at this time, producing a number of songs, including "Always" and "All Over Again", both of which received limited national radio airplay. The group also slightly modified their name during this time, to the surf-inspired "The Sandals". For a time, the group toured with the film, providing live backing for the live narration by Bruce Brown.

After The Endless Summer film reached nationwide distribution, the Sandals recorded the song "Endless Summer", one of their first songs with vocals. The song was a departure in a number of ways, and not just relating to the vocals. They were attempting a Beach Boys-esque sound, with mixed results. They also re-released the Scrambler! LP as The Endless Summer, along with new single records similarly retitled.

In 1967, Dick Barrymore hired the Sandals to score his skiing documentary, The Last of the Ski Bums. As on Scrambler!, John Blakeley's songwriting skills were at the forefront of the album — 10 of the 12 songs contained at least some of his input. However, this album also marked Danny's departure from the band after he refused to leave San Clemente, California, where the band had been based, for Riverside, California. He was replaced by Steve Ekwall, who played on the album.

Soon after the release of the Last of the Ski Bums album, the group broke up.

The Georis brothers went on to start the restaurant Casanova in Carmel, California, in 1977, and, in 1983, Walter established the restaurant Fandango in Pacific Grove, California; (Note: The Georis' sister married a US GI and immigrated to the United States after World War II, divorced, and remarried a chef. Their sister established La Boheme in 1974 at Carmel, California, and is now called La Bicyclette and is owned by Gaston Georis and directed by his son Gabe Georis since 2015.) (Note: The Georis brothers purchased a house without a foundation from Aunt Fairy Bird, who was the cook for Charlie Chaplin, for $171,000 in 1977 and converted it into their own restaurant Casanova.) (Note: Walter Georis sold Fandango to Pierre and Marietta Bain in 1988.) Walter Georis established Georis Winery on 40 acres (16 ha) of Cachaqua ranchland 20 miles (32 km) from the ocean in upper Carmel Valley in the early 1980s and began selling wine since 1982 including the Endless Summer label. In 2011, Walter and Sylvia Georis established Cowgirl Winery with assistance from Damien Georis. Both of these wineries are in the Carmel Valley AVA wine region of California.

Danny Brawner worked for Hobie Surfboards as the factory manager and also doing finish work on boards like pinlines and color work.

John Blakeley remained involved in music, joining Stoneground in 1971.

There have been two reunions to date: in 1992, the Georis brothers and Blakeley reformed the band, and released a few albums, most notably working on The Endless Summer II. They also rerecorded (in 1992) the original album (that includes a few new songs) using some of the original instruments. In 2002, the Georis', Blakeley, Gibson, and Brawner played at the Galaxy Theater in Santa Ana, California, to a packed house.

== Discography ==
=== As the Sandells ===
==== LPs ====
- 1964 – Scrambler!

==== 45s ====
- 1964 – "Scrambler"/"Out Front"
- 1964 – "School's Out!"/"Wild as the Sea"
- 1964 – "Theme from the Endless Summer"/"6-pak"

=== As the Sandals ===
==== LPs ====
- 1966 – The Endless Summer Soundtrack
- 1969 – Last of the Ski Bums Soundtrack
- 1992 – The Endless Summer Soundtrack (rerecorded, including a few new songs)
- 1994 – The Spirit of Surf
- 2001 – Silvertone
- 2003 – Wild as the Sea: Complete Sandals 1964–1969 (Collection)

==== 45s ====
- 1964 – "Always (I Will Remember)"/"All Over Again"
- 1965 – "Endless Summer"/"Theme From The Endless Summer"
- 1966 – "Theme from the Endless Summer"/"6-pak"
- 1966 – "Tell Us Dylan"/"Why Should I Cry"
- 1967 – "Cloudy"/"House of Painted Glass"
- 1969 – "Winter Spell"/"Ski Bum"

== Books ==
- McParland, Stephan (March 10, 2003). Endlessly Summer: An Abridged History Of The Sandals (A deluxe 12 page book with detailed notes from Wild as the Sea: Complete Sandals 1964–1969 (RVCD-151).). Music CD by The Sandals. Melbourne, Australia: Raven Records. ASIN B000089IZQ. Archived from the original on March 21, 2012.
