= Robert August =

American surfer and surfboard shaper

Personal information
- Website: www.robertaugust.com

Surfing career
- Sport: Surfing

Surfing specifications
- Stance: Goofy

Robert August (born 1945) is an American surfer and surfboard shaper. He is best known as one of the subjects of Bruce Brown's 1966 surf documentary The Endless Summer, along with his friend Mike Hynson.

August was raised in Seal Beach, California. His father, Blackie August, was an early surfer who began teaching him the sport at age 6. He attended Huntington Beach High School where he was ASB President his senior year.

He enrolled in the dentistry program at California State Long Beach, but dropped out before earning a degree.

In 1994, August was involved in the filming of The Endless Summer II, in which surfers Pat O'Connell and Robert "Wingnut" Weaver retrace the places visited by August and Hynson 30 years earlier. He also took part in the film Step into Liquid.

As of 2023, August had retired from surfing and is living in Southern California.
