= Dale Webster =

American surfer (1948–2025)

- Webster on October 4, 2015, the last day of his surfing streak
- Born: November 25, 1948; Alhambra, California, U.S.
- Died: August 9, 2025 (aged 76); Rohnert Park, California, U.S.
- Occupation: Surfer
- Years active: 1975–2015 (surfing)
- Known for: Having the Guinness World Record for the most consecutive days spent surfing
- Spouse: Kaye Webster (died 2008)
- Children: 1

Dale Webster (November 25, 1948 – August 9, 2025), nicknamed "the Daily Wavester", was an American surfer who set the official Guinness World Record for the "most consecutive days spent surfing" (14,641). He also appeared in the 2003 movie Step into Liquid.

== The record ==
Between September 3, 1975, and October 4, 2015, Webster caught at least three waves to shore at Bodega Bay, Northern California, per day, though most days, he caught many more. He did this every day, despite going through dangerous and inconvenient situations: hurricane-force winds, shark infestations, car breakdowns, and kidney stone complications, among others, making him the record-setter for the "most consecutive days spent surfing". He also set the world record for most waves caught: 43,923 confirmed waves.

Webster ended his surfing streak on October 5, 2015, when, at the age of 66, he underwent a minor kidney stone surgery and did not go surfing. He had surfed every day for 40 years, one month and one day (14,641 days in a row).

According to Webster, he did this for a number of reasons: his wetsuit was damaged and he wanted to surf for a full year to force the manufacturer into replacing it (incorrectly interpreting the warranty) and that he attempted to beat what he thought was the record for the most consecutive days surfed (5280), but was actually the record for the longest distance surfed to shore (in feet).

== Personal life and death ==
Webster was born in Alhambra, California, on November 25, 1948, to John, a train engineer, and Grace Webster, an accountant. He had two siblings. While setting his record, Webster married his wife, Kaye; raised his daughter, at the time of his death a college student; and held several jobs. He went through thirty boards and twenty eight wet suits. His daughter, Margo, set a record of her own by being the first student in her school district to attend elementary through high school with perfect attendance. Kaye died of cancer in 2008.

Webster died in Rohnert Park, California, on August 9, 2025, at the age of 76.

== In the media ==
Webster was featured in an article in Surfer magazine under the title "The Daily Wavester", as well as in various other newspaper stories. He was featured in a four-minute scene in Dana Brown's 2003 surf movie Step into Liquid; a character in the movie is seen using a roll of stickers imprinted with the slogan "DALE WOULD GO". His narrow escape from a great white shark was mentioned in an article in the local newspaper.

== Filmography ==
Year	Title	Role	Notes
2003	Step into Liquid	Self	
