= Turns All Year =

Skiing phenomenon

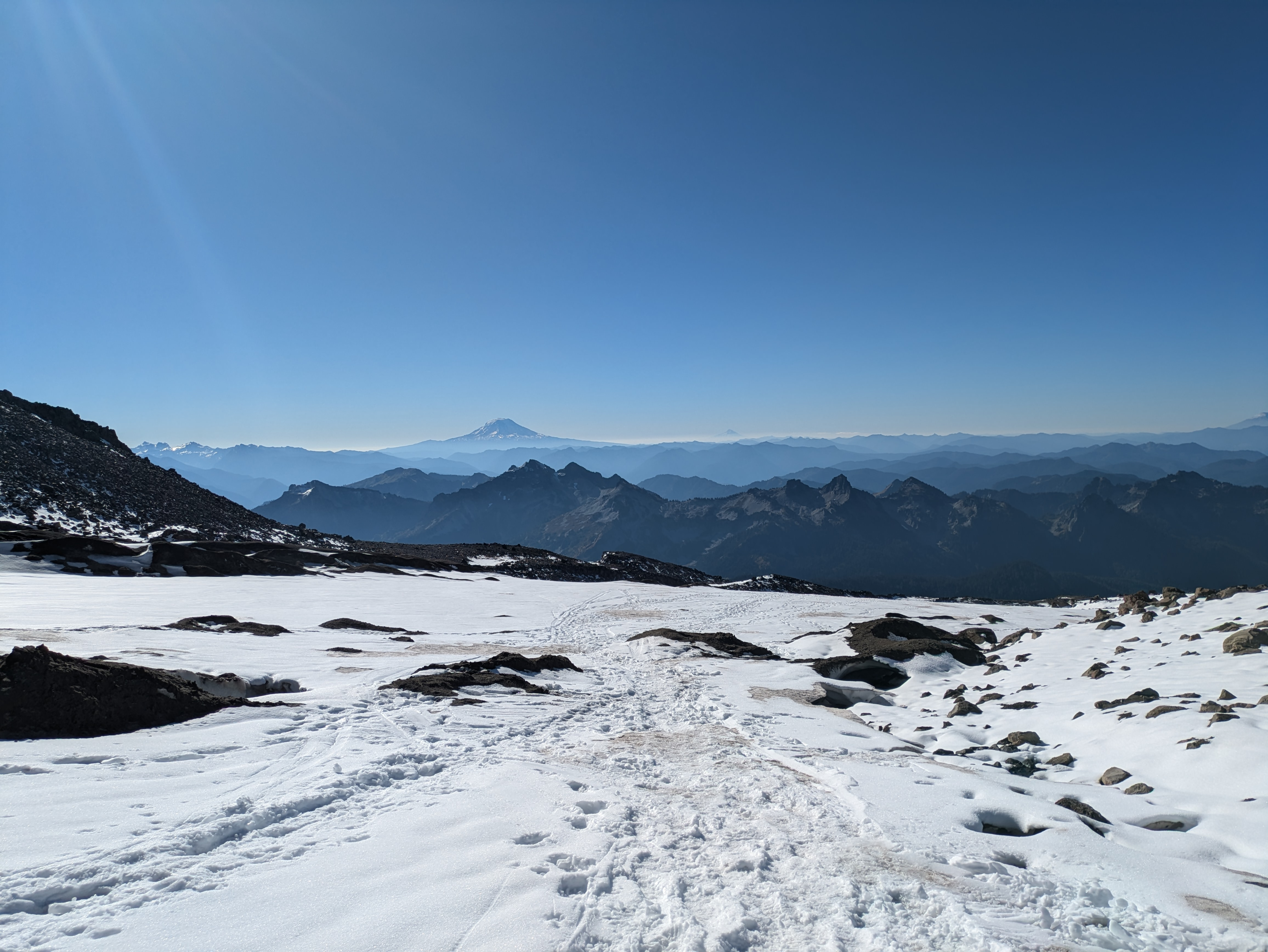
Ski tracks on the Muir snowfield, a popular place for summer skiing

Turns All Year is a phenomenon where people ski at least once during every month of the year, including the summer. The phenomenon originated in the Pacific Northwest, where year-round skiing is possible thanks to permanent snowfields and glaciers. The term was coined by Charles Eldridge, a neurobiologist who said he was already skiing every month of the year when he created the turns-all-year.com website to share trip reports for backcountry skiing in Washington state. Eldridge eventually retired after 128 straight months of skiing, while other devotees have racked up longer streaks. He told Ski that originally skiing every month is "a physical and mental challenge", that later becomes an end in itself. Mount Rainier is a popular place to go for Turns All Year enthusiasts looking to get in their summer skiing. Although Turns All Year is most popular in the Pacific Northwest, Colorado, and Montana, it has followers in Canada, Utah, and even the East Coast of the United States. There are some ski resorts in both North America and Europe that are open during the summer.

People who participate in Turns All Year have been labeled "obsessive-compulsives" and "diehard". According to SnowBrains contributor Clay Malott, skiing every month of the year "takes lots of planning and schedule flexibility" but especially dedication. An even more extreme version is skiing every single day for a year. According to Malott, it is easiest to ski year round in the Pacific Northwest, possible in the Rockies, and more difficult for skiers who live on the eastern coast of the United States. He recommends skiing at resorts when they are open because it is easier, and venturing into the backcountry in the summer. He writes that August is the most difficult month as you most likely have to rely on permanent snowfields, and September is also very challenging although sometimes new snow can fall before the end of the month. One adherent estimated that there are a few thousand people in the United States with a year round skiing streak. In 2020, Road West Traveled released a film following Carl Zimmer's quest to ski every month of the year.

Climate change is melting permanent snowfields in places such as Utah and Washington State, making turns all year more difficult.

== See also ==
- The Endless Summer—1966 American surf documentary film that proposes a similar concept
