= The Endless Summer II =

1994 American film

- Theatrical release poster
- Directed by: Bruce Brown
- Written by: Bruce Brown; Dana Brown
- Produced by: Ron Moler; Roger Riddell
- Starring: Robert "Wingnut" Weaver; Pat O'Connell
- Distributed by: New Line Cinema
- Release date: June 3, 1994
- Running time: 109 minutes
- Country: United States
- Language: English

The Endless Summer II is a 1994 film directed by Bruce Brown and is a sequel to his 1966 film The Endless Summer. In The Endless Summer II, surfers Pat O'Connell and Robert "Wingnut" Weaver retrace the steps of Mike Hynson and Robert August. It shows the growth and evolution of the surfing scene since the first film, which presented only classic longboard surfing. O'Connell rides a shortboard, which was developed in the time between the two movies, and there are scenes of windsurfing and bodyboarding.

The film illustrates how far surfing had spread, with footage of surf sessions in France, South Africa, Costa Rica, Australia, Bali, Java, and even Alaska. It also has a brief cameo appearance by morey surfer Felipe Zylbersztajn, Steve Irwin, and Mary, a crocodile from Irwin's Australia Zoo.

In 2003, Dana Brown, Bruce's son, made what is seen as the "third movie", Step into Liquid. It follows the evolution of surfing over the last 10–15 years from shortboarding to tow-in surfing.

== Year-end lists ==
- 8th – David Stupich, The Milwaukee Journal
