= On Any Sunday =

1971 American documentary film by Bruce Brown

- Theatrical release poster
- Directed by: Bruce Brown
- Written by: Bruce Brown
- Produced by: Bruce Brown; Steve McQueen; Robert Bagley
- Starring: Steve McQueen; Mert Lawwill; Malcolm Smith; Paul Carruthers
- Narrated by: Bruce Brown
- Cinematography: Robert E. Collins; Bruce Brown
- Edited by: Bruce Brown; Brian King
- Music by: Dominic Frontiere
- Distributed by: Cinema 5
- Release date: 1971
- Running time: 96 minutes
- Country: United States
- Language: English
- Budget: $313,000
- Box office: $1.2 million

On Any Sunday is a 1971 American documentary film about motorcycle sport, directed by Bruce Brown. It was nominated for a 1972 Academy Award for Best Documentary Feature. Brown tried to show the unique talents needed for the different forms of racing. For instance, the motocross riders were typically free-spirited types, while desert racers were often loners. In Grand National racing, Brown showed widely differing personalities, such as the business-like approach to racing displayed by Mert Lawwill versus the carefree approach that David Aldana became known for.

In addition to Lawwill, Steve McQueen is featured in the film, along with Malcolm Smith and many other motorcycle racers from the late 1960s and early 1970s.

== Production ==
The film was financially backed, in part, by McQueen through his "Solar Productions company," which received credit in the final seconds of the film. Some of the more dramatic shots were extreme closeup slow-motion segments of the Grand National races. From his surfing movie days, Brown was used to working with super telephoto lenses. The budget didn't allow the expense of high-speed cameras, so Brown improvised by using 24-volt batteries in the 12-volt film cameras. The result was a makeshift high-speed camera. Brown also used a helmet camera on some of the riders, an approach that had not been widely attempted previously due to the bulk of film cameras of the day.

Regarding his filming method, Brown said:

At times I'd have a particular shot in mind. For example, I wanted to shoot a muddy motocross race and show the riders with mud all over them. First you have to be at a motocross race when it rains, then you have to find a good location to shoot. We tried and tried to get a shot with a rider caked with mud. We finally did get the shot, but for a while it seemed like we never would.

At one point, Brown found a perfect location for a sunset beach riding shot—Marine Corps Base Camp Pendleton.

I figured there would be no way to get approval to film on the Marine base," Brown recalls. "Steve McQueen said he'd see what he could find out. The next day he called and was told to contact some General and the next thing you know we are shooting the beach sequences. It was pretty amazing the doors he was able to open.

== Critical reception ==
Roger Ebert says it "does for motorcycle racing what The Endless Summer did for surfing". Ebert praises the film's high level of artistry in accomplishing the impressive footage of motorcycle races (which he says are difficult to film), and he also credits the film for not bothering viewers with the technical details of how the filming was done.

== Impact ==
During the opening sequence, children are seen riding their bicycles on a dirt track, in imitation of motorcyclists. Thanks to this scene, On Any Sunday is thought to have popularized BMX biking across America; previously it had only been observed in Southern California. Brown himself also believed the film changed public perception of motorcycle racers from "bad guys" (as depicted in popular films like The Wild One) to popular heroes.

Malcolm Smith credits his appearance in On Any Sunday with giving him the worldwide recognition that enabled him to become a leading entrepreneur in the off-road motorcycling business.

Several follow-ups to the film were produced:

- On Any Sunday II (1981), starring Bob Hannah and Larry Huffman
- On Any Sunday: Revisited (2000), by Dana Brown
- On Any Sunday: Motocross, Malcolm, & More (2001), by Dana Brown
- On Any Sunday, The Next Chapter (2014), by Dana Brown
