= Mike Hynson =

American surfer (1942–2025)

Mike Hynson (June 28, 1942 – January 10, 2025) was an American surfer and surfboard shaper. He was best known as one of the two subjects of Bruce Brown's 1966 surf documentary The Endless Summer, along with Robert August.

Hynson was born on June 28, 1942, in Crescent City, California, the elder of two sons of Robert Hynson, a U.S. Navy engineer and Grace (Wheaton) Hynson. In his early years, the family divided its time between Hawaii and San Diego, finally settling in Southern California when he was 10. As a teenager, he took up surfing.

After graduating from La Jolla High School in San Diego, Hynson starting receiving draft notices to serve in the war in Vietnam. By the age of 21 he'd "been sidestepping them for three years,” he wrote in his memoir. Being tapped for the documentary film, which was largely shot overseas, “was the miracle I needed,” he later wrote.

He was known not only for his surfing skills, but also as a noted builder of surfboards, particularly the popular Red Fin long board.

Hynson was instrumental in the creation of the movie Rainbow Bridge (1971), which he originally conceived as a surfing film with the working title of "Wave". It was directed by Chuck Wein, a protégé of Andy Warhol, and touched on mysticism and drug use, in addition to surfing. The film's climax centers on a Jimi Hendrix concert at the base of the Haleakala volcano in Maui.

Perhaps the most cited scene in The Endless Summer involves Hynson riding a wave at Cape St. Francis, South Africa, with the narrator, Bruce Brown, referencing the mythic "perfect wave" that all surfers dream of. Clips of the ride regularly circulate around social media sites, showing the youthful Hynson looking mesmerized as he glides his Hobie surfboard in the curl of a seemingly never-ending tubular wave.

Hynson died January 10, 2025, in Encinitas, California, at the age of 82.
