= Robert Weaver (surfer) =

American surfer (born 1965)

Robert "Wingnut" Weaver (born 1965) is an American surfer. He has appeared in several of Bruce Brown's surf films, starring in three of them alongside Pat O'Connell. In 1991, Weaver graduated from University of California, Santa Cruz with a degree in economics and marketing.

== Films ==
Weaver starred in:
The Endless Summer II (1994)
The Endless Summer Revisited (2000)
Step Into Liquid (2003)
Chasing Dora (2006)
Wingnut's Search For Soul (1997)
