= The Endless Summer =

1966 American surf documentary film

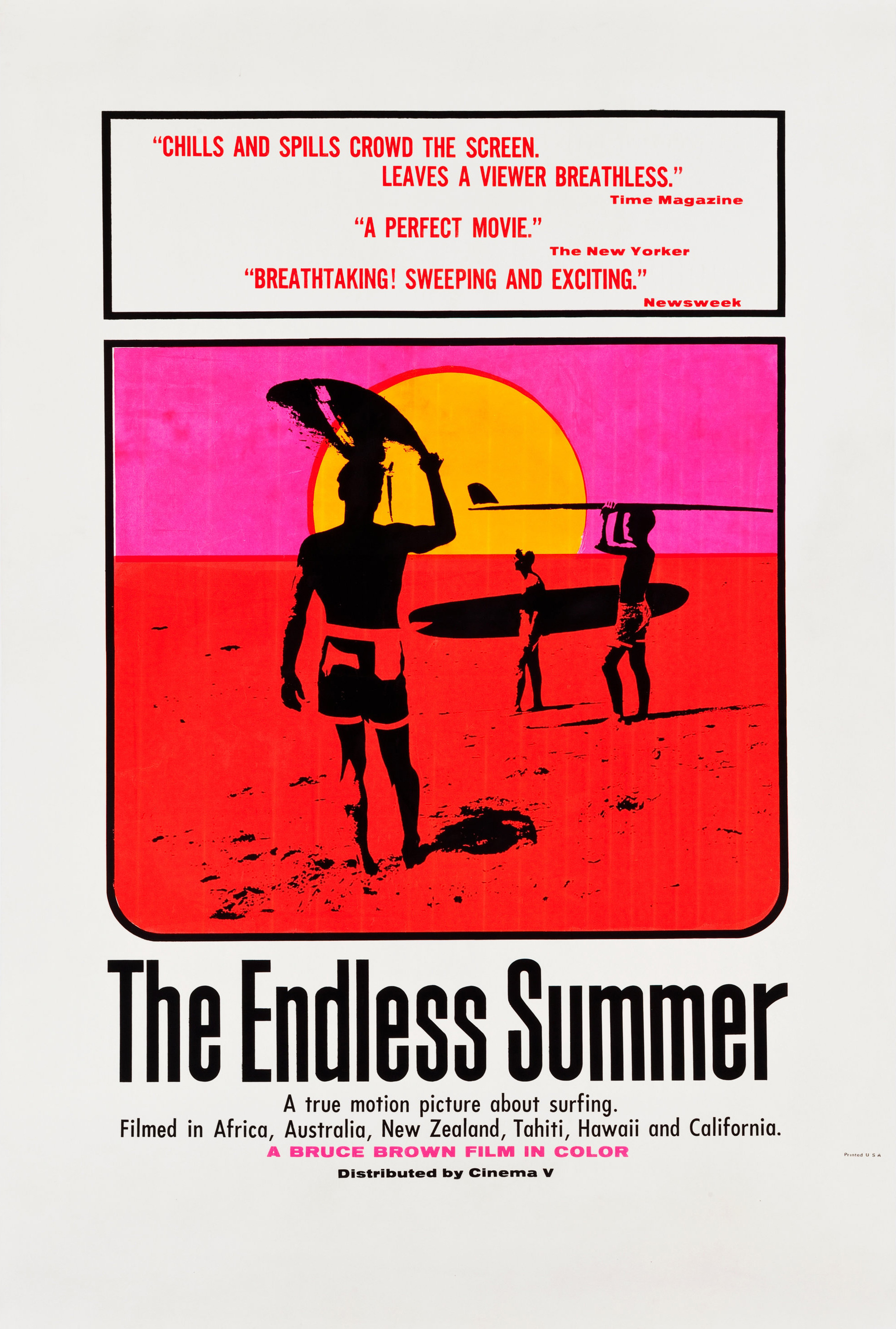
- Film poster
- Directed by: Bruce Brown
- Produced by: Bruce Brown
- Starring: Mike Hynson; Robert August; Sammy Lee
- Narrated by: Bruce Brown
- Edited by: Bruce Brown
- Music by: The Sandals
- Production company: Bruce Brown Films
- Distributed by: Cinema V Distributing
- Release date: June 15, 1966
- Running time: 95 minutes
- Country: United States
- Language: English
- Budget: $50,000
- Box office: $20 million

The Endless Summer is a 1966 American surf documentary film directed, produced, edited and narrated by Bruce Brown. The film follows surfers Mike Hynson and Robert August on a surfing trip around the world. Despite the balmy mediterranean climate of their native California, cold ocean currents make local beaches inhospitable during the winter, without later, modern wetsuits. They travel to the coasts of Australia, New Zealand, Tahiti, Hawaii, Senegal, Ghana, Nigeria and South Africa in a quest for new surf spots while introducing locals to the sport along the way.

The narrative presentation eases from the stiff, formal documentary of the 1950s and early 1960s to a more casual, fun-loving and personal style filled with sly humor, honed from six years of live narration. The film's surf rock soundtrack was provided by the Sandals, and the theme song was written by Gaston Georis and John Blakeley of the Sandals; Theme From "The Endless Summer" has since become one of the best known film themes in the surf movie genre.

In 1994, it was followed by the sequel The Endless Summer II. In 2000, Dana Brown, compiled The Endless Summer Revisited, later directing Step into Liquid, in 2003, documenting tow-in surfing.

== Background ==
=== 8 mm ===
Bruce Brown started surfing in the early 1950s. He took still photographs to show his mother what the draw of the sport was. While serving in the U.S. Navy on Oahu years later, he used an 8mm movie camera to photograph surfers from California. When Brown returned to the States, he edited the footage into an hour-long film. Surfer Dale Velzy showed it at his San Clemente shop, charging 25 cents for admission.

=== 16 mm ===
Bob Bagley chose the equipment at the camera store, including a 16 mm camera, and Velzy peeled off the money from his wad of cash to outfit Brown's $5,000 production Slippery When Wet (1958), Brown's first "real" surf film.

In the winter of 1958, Brown went back to Hawaii to film the North Shore's big surf. Just as Allen had done, to learn promotion, Brown went to the library for a book about how to make movies, and on the plane ride over, the novice filmmaker read the book. Brown said, "I never had formal training in filmmaking and that probably worked to my advantage". In 1959, Dick Metz's meeting with John Whitmore, on a Cape Town beach, and introduction to Cape St. Francis, during his family-liquor-license-sale-to-Disneyland-funded three-year global surf trip (1958—1961) led to his inspiring Bruce Brown to film there, By 1962, he had spent five years making one surf film per year, exhibiting at high school gyms and coffee houses, as a live production, narrating the silent film, from the stage, and playing tape recorded music and a letter, to Whitmore, about Brown. He would shoot during the fall and winter months, edit during the spring and show the finished product during the summer.

Prior to The Endless Summer, Brown made unnamed 25¢ silent 8mm film footage, and Slippery When Wet (1958), Surf Crazy (1959), Barefoot Adventure (1960), Surfing Hollow Days (1961), and Waterlogged (1962). Each year, Allen and Brown made two tours, of the West Coast of the United States, and Hawaiʻi, exhibiting a film.

We would take the films to the venues in a van, and we had rewinds and viewers in the back of the van and I would actually edit the stuff while we were traveling. I would adjust it according to the reactions of the audience from the previous night.

— Bruce Brown

== Title ==
The film's title comes from the idea expressed at both the beginning and end of the film that, if one had enough time and money, it would be possible to follow the summer up and down the world (northern to southern hemisphere and back), making it endless.

== Development ==
Brown remembered, "I felt if I could take two years to make a film, maybe I could make something special". To do this, he would need a bigger budget than he had on previous films. To raise the $50,000 budget for The Endless Summer, Brown took the best footage from his four previous films and made Waterlogged. With the money raised from Waterlogged, Brown filmed The Endless Summer, his sixth surf film.

Brown's original concept was for Cape St. Francis to be the main destination, but through the suggestion of a travel agent, during the planning stages of the film, that a round-the-world ticket, would cost $50 cheaper than just a Los Angeles to Cape Town, South Africa, round-trip flight. after which Bruce came up with the idea of following the summer season by traveling up and down the world.

== Production ==
The Endless Summer was filmed in:

- Southern Hemisphere: South Africa (Cape St. Francis), Australia, New Zealand (Manu Bay), and Tahiti.
- Northern Hemisphere: Hawaii, California (Salt Creek Beach, Steamer Lane, Malibu), Senegal, Ghana (Labadi), and Nigeria.

Mike Hynson and Robert August had to pay $1,400 for their own around-the-world tickets, and Brown required a commitment of three months. Production lasted four months.

The opening shot of Mike Hynson and Robert August as silhouettes walking to the beach with burnt orange sky evokes the movie poster.

== Cast ==
- Mike Hynson
- Robert August
- Corky Carroll
- Nat Young
- Butch Van Artsdalen
- Mickey Dora
- Phil Edwards
- Wayne Miyata
- Chuck Gardner
- Chip Fitzwater
- Dave Thynell
- Greg Noll
- Lord James Blears
- Roy Crump
- Steven R. Davis
- Terence Bullen

(South African guide)

== Poster ==
In 1964, fellow surfer John Van Hamersveld was a student at the Art Center College of Design and the art director of Surfing Illustrated Magazine and Surfer magazine. To produce the image that would become iconic, he organized a photo session with the producer and the two stars at Salt Creek Beach in Dana Point. Using photo techniques for the central image and hand-lettering the title Van Hamersveld created a “national phenomenon” image that has endured as a classic. He was paid $150 for the art. The poster is featured in the National Museum of American History section of the Smithsonian Institution. In the description the museum noted, “The poster’s premise was Brown's, but Van Hamersveld took Bob Bagley’s image of the movie’s stars Mike Hynson and Robert August and Brown and transformed it into a 1960s neon masterpiece.”

== Distribution ==
Bruce Brown, at first, narrated the silent film live, from the stage, and accompanied it with tape recorded music, at school auditoriums, and similar venues, with R. Paul Allen collecting tickets, travelling by camper. He later took the completed film to several Hollywood studio distributors but was rejected because they did not think it would have mainstream appeal. In January 1964, Bruce Brown and R. Paul Allen took The Endless Summer to Wichita, Kansas and four-walled the Sunset Theater for two weeks, amidst a projectionist strike, with a bomb threat on the first showing, where moviegoers lined up in snowy weather in the middle of winter, selling out multiple screenings, and locally outgrossing My Fair Lady. Distributors were still not convinced and Brown rented a theater in New York City where his film ran successfully for 48 weeks. After the success of the run at New York's Kips Bay Theater, Don Rugoff of Cinema V distribution said he did not want the film or poster changed and wanted them distributed as is, thus Brown selected him over other distributors who wished to alter the poster. When distributed by Cinema V, The Endless Summer grossed $5 million domestically and over $20 million worldwide.

== Reception ==
On Rotten Tomatoes, the film has an aggregate score of 100% based on 21 critic reviews. Roger Ebert said of Brown's work, "the beautiful photography he brought home almost makes you wonder if Hollywood hasn't been trying too hard". Time magazine wrote, "Brown leaves analysis of the surf-cult mystique to seagoing sociologists, but demonstrates quite spiritedly that some of the brave souls mistaken for beachniks are, in fact, converts to a difficult, dangerous and dazzling sport".

In his review for The New York Times, Robert Alden wrote, "the subject matter itself—the challenge and the joy of a sport that is part swimming, part skiing, part sky-diving and part Russian roulette—is buoyant fun".

== Legacy ==
When The Endless Summer premiered on June 15, 1966, it encouraged many surfers to travel abroad, giving birth to the "surf-and-travel" culture, with prizes for finding "uncrowded surf", meeting new people and riding the "perfect wave". It also introduced the sport, which had become popular outside of Hawaii and the Polynesian Islands in places like California and Australia, to a broader audience.

The then-unknown break off Cape St. Francis in South Africa, characterized as having the “perfect wave”, became one of the most famous surfing sites due to The Endless Summer.

In 2002, The Endless Summer was selected for preservation in the United States National Film Registry by the Library of Congress as being "culturally, historically, or aesthetically significant".

== Gallery ==
Publicity photos from the making of The Endless Summer

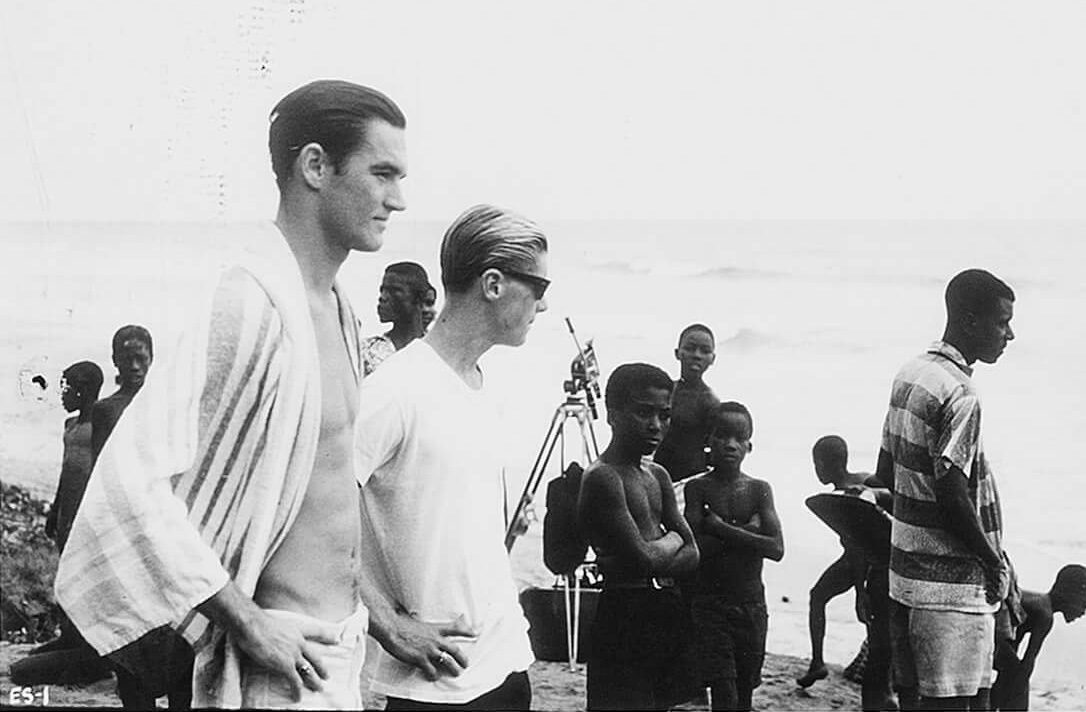

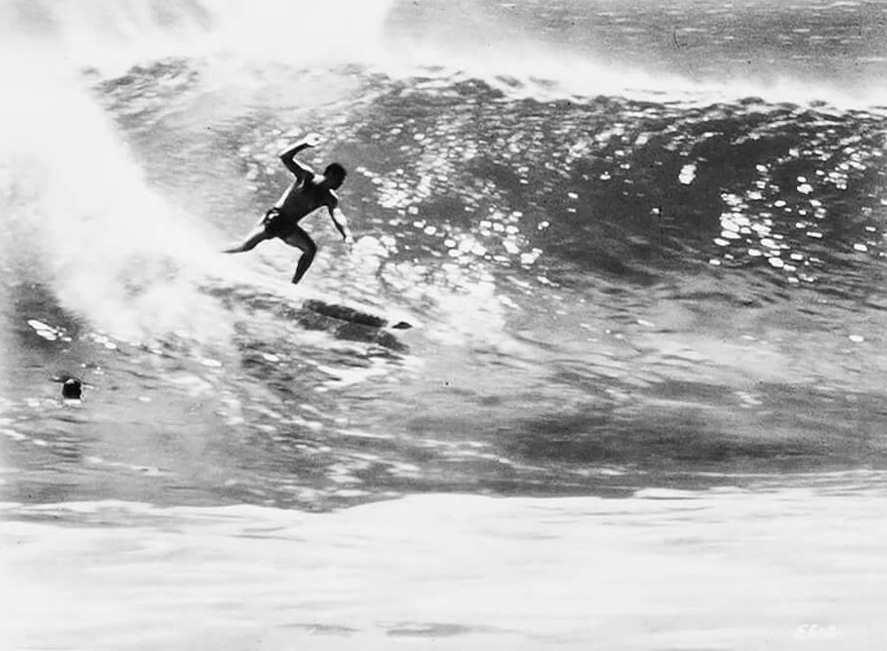

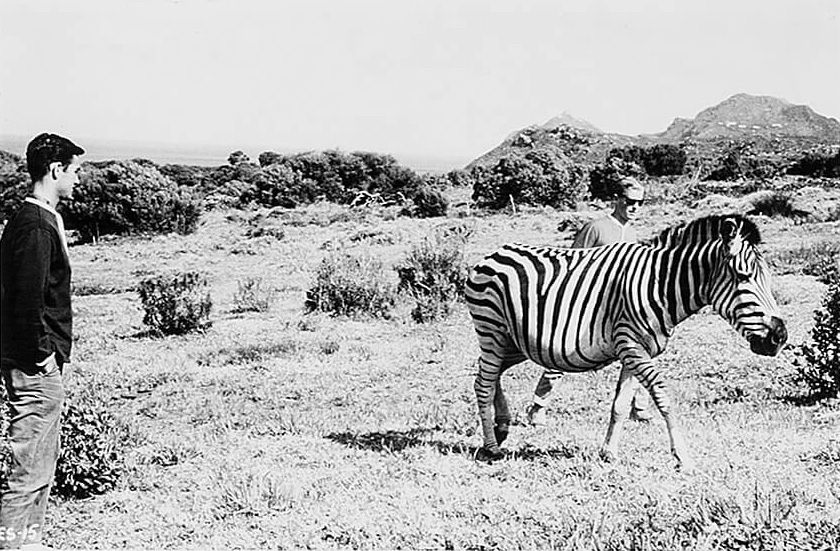

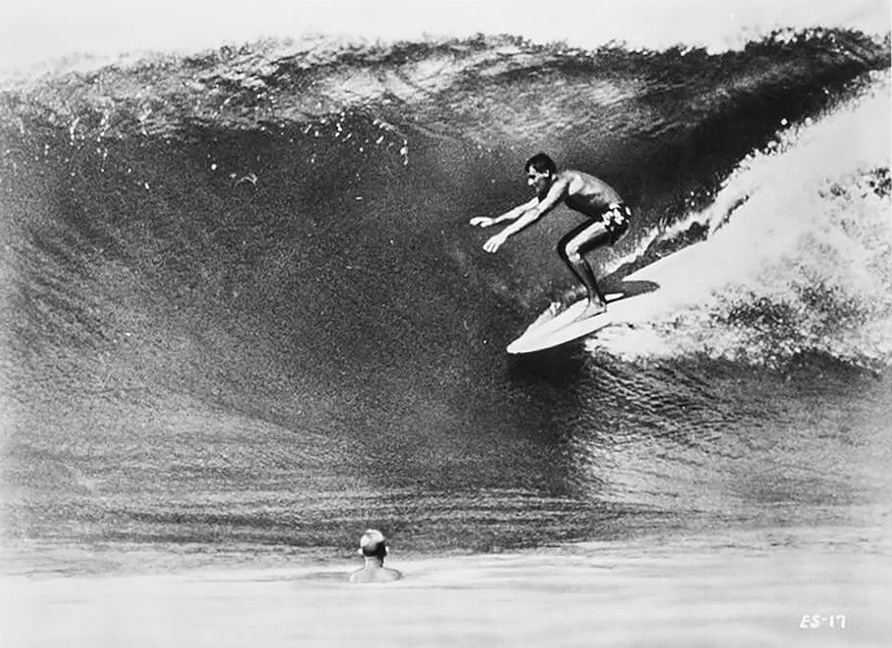

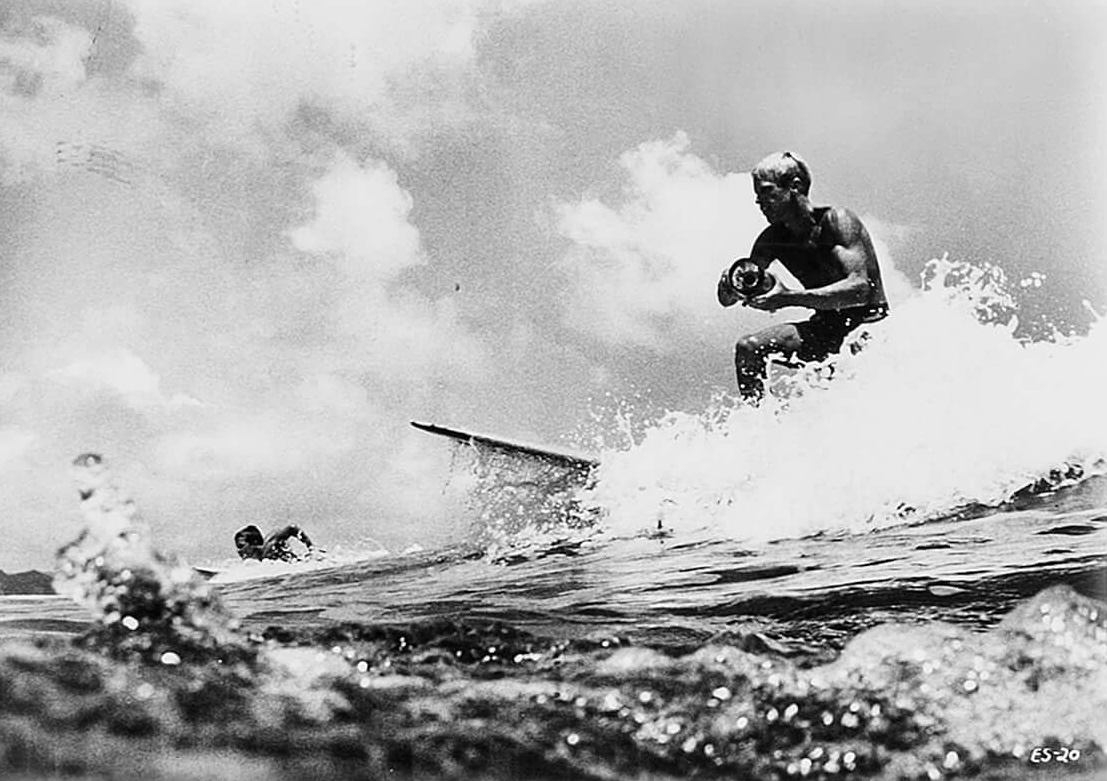

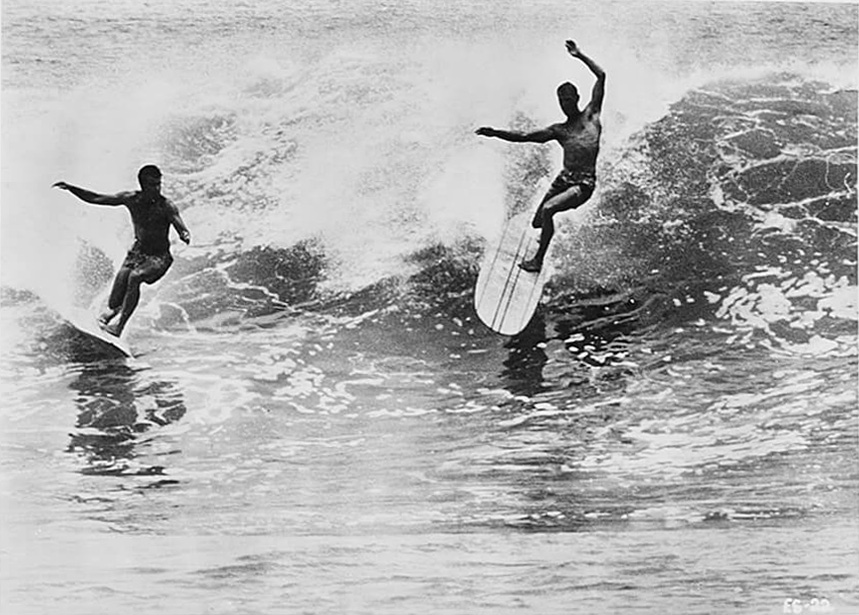

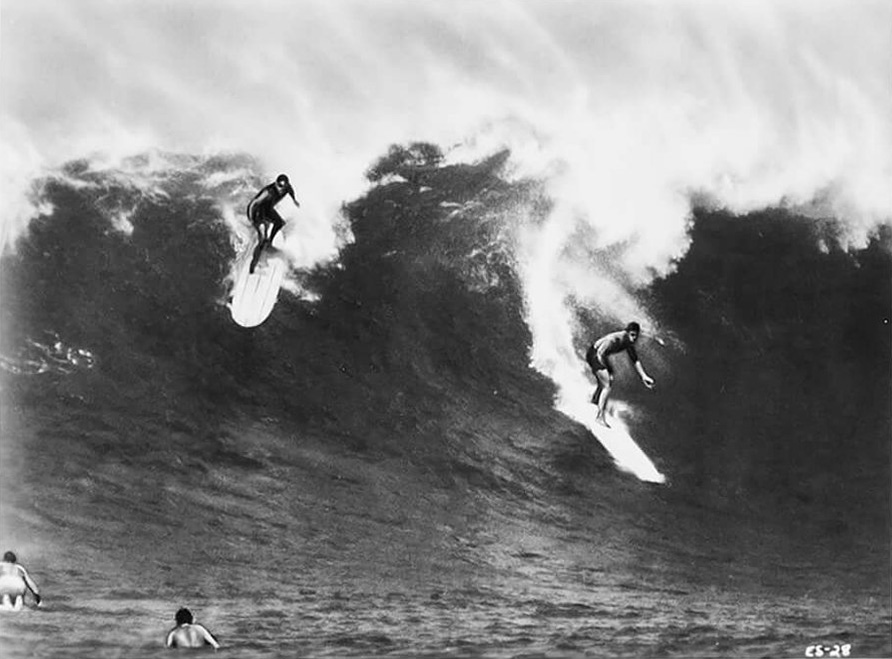

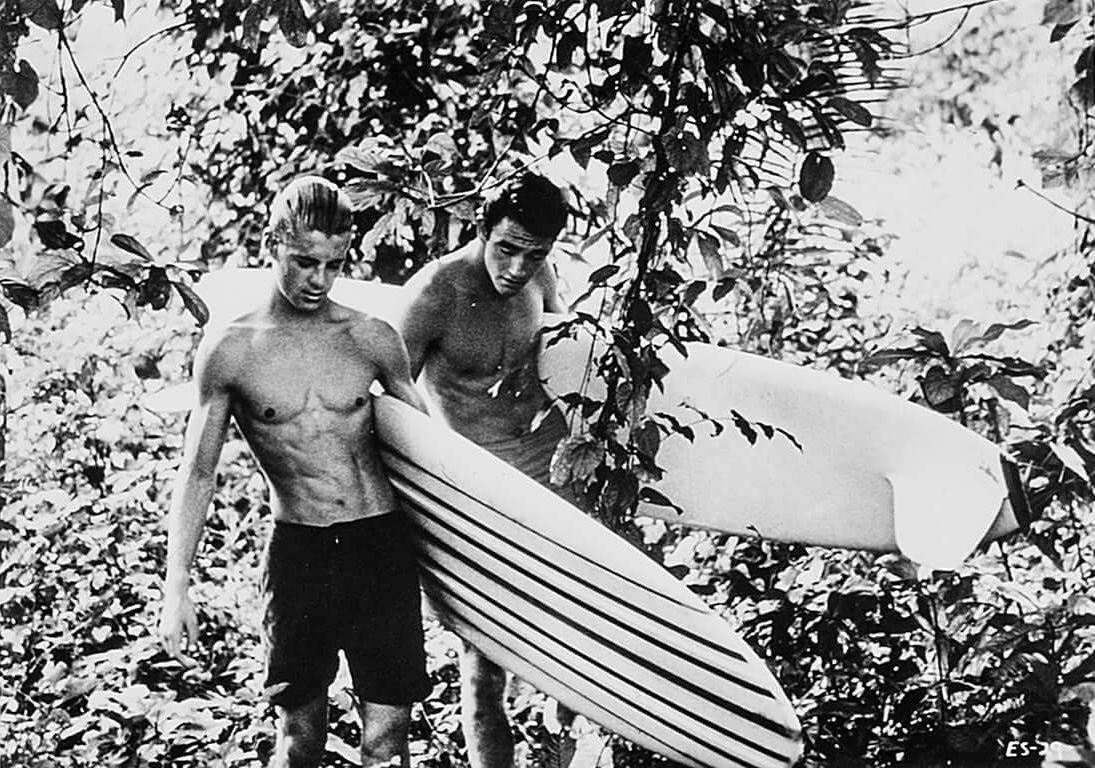

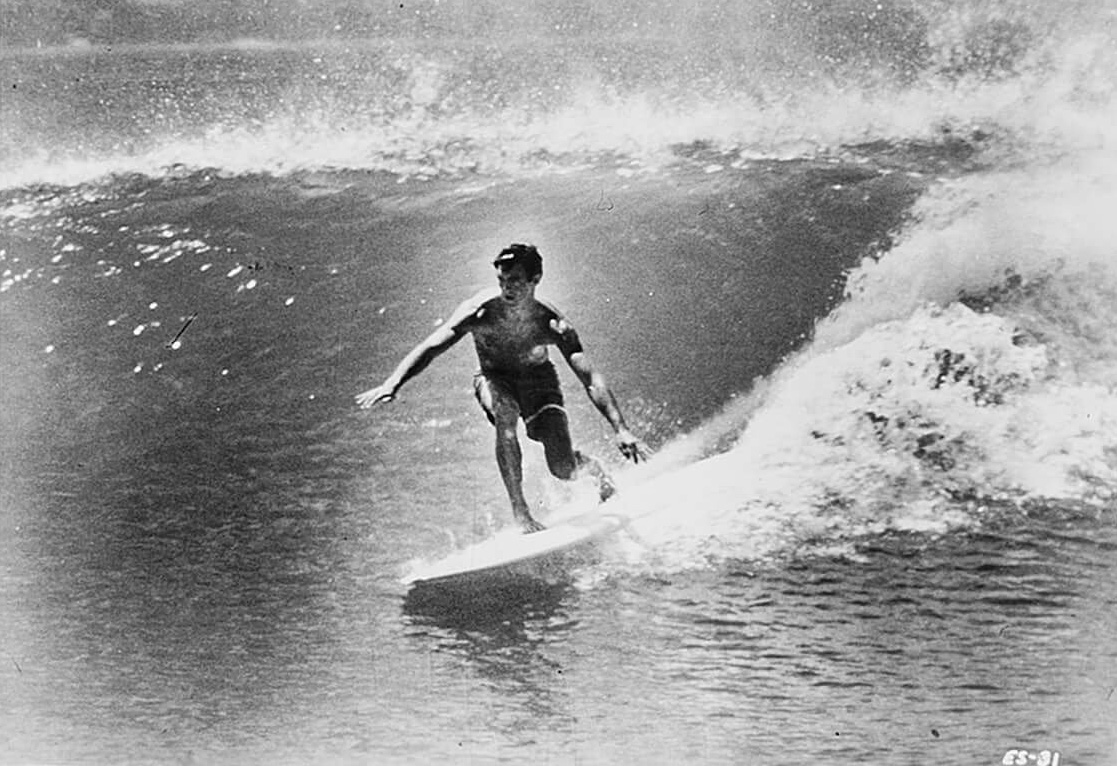

== Sequels ==
In 1994, Brown released a sequel, The Endless Summer II, in which surfers Pat O'Connell and Robert "Wingnut" Weaver retrace the steps of Hynson and August. It shows the growth and evolution of the surfing scene since the first film, which presented only classic longboard surfing. O'Connell rides a shortboard, which was developed in the time between the two movies, and there are scenes of windsurfing and bodyboarding.

The 1994 film illustrates how far surfing had spread since 1964, with footage of surf sessions in France, South Africa, Costa Rica, Bali, Java, and even Alaska. The 1994 sequel follows a similar structure to the original, with another round the world surfing adventure reflecting on cultural differences since the first film was shot. The South Africa material includes a return visit to Cape St. Francis, where the “perfect wave” had deteriorated somewhat, due to onshore construction projects.

In 2000, Dana Brown, Bruce's son, released The Endless Summer Revisited, which consisted of unused footage from the first two films, as well as original cast interviews.
