= Pat O'Connell (surfer) =

American professional surfer (born 1971)

Patrick O'Connell (born 1971) is a retired professional surfer who competed in the top ranks of the Association of Surfing Professionals (now called The World Surf League) before retiring and working in the surfwear industry and as a top executive with the World Surf League. He is best known to the general public as one of two surfers - along with Robert "Wingnut" Weaver - in Bruce Brown's The Endless Summer II. The film was a 1994 follow-up to Brown's landmark 1966 surf documentary The Endless Summer.

== Biography ==
Born in Chicago in 1971, O'Connell moved to Newport Beach and then Dana Point in the early 1980s where he was a member of the Dana Hills High surf team. In 1990, O'Connell represented the United States in the World Amateur Championships in Japan, winning the first event and finishing ninth overall in the Open Division also winning two PSAA events. He gained celebrity status when he took one of the lead roles in Bruce Brown's remake of his 1966 classic The Endless Summer. He maintained his seed for many seasons, peaking in 1998 at 11th on the World Champion Tour WCT and 10th in the Surfer Poll.

O'Connell and fellow pro surfer Mike "Snips" Parsons launched The Realm, a start-up clothing venture. After many seasons on the ASP World Tour, O'Connell retired "on his own terms", having requalified for the 2005 tour at the last event in Hawaii. Soon after walking away from full-time competition, O'Connell began a marketing job for Hurley International. Pat has also been one of the regulars (along with Donavon Frankenreiter and Benji Weatherley) on the "Drive Thru" series of surf movies and television shows since 2005. He is a 2009 inductee into the Surfers' Hall of Fame in Huntington Beach, California.

== Association of Surfing Professionals World Tour rankings ==
1995: 29th
1996: 32nd
1997: 17th
1998: 11th
1999: 25th
2000: 40th
2001: 23rd
2002: 32nd
2003: 35th
2004: 26th
ASP World Tour Archived Results and Rankings

== Filmography ==
- The Endless Summer II (1994)
- Rusty Surfboards No Thrills for the Cautious (1991)
- Rusty Surfboards Under the Same Sun(1994)
- Rusty Surfboards Playground (1995)
- The Endless Summer Revisited (2000)
- Chasing Dora (2006)
