= Dana Brown (filmmaker) =

American surfer and filmmaker

Dana Brown (born December 11, 1959, in Dana Point, California) is an American surfer and filmmaker, and is the oldest son of filmmaker Bruce Brown. His films include The Endless Summer Revisited (2000) which is made up of unused footage from The Endless Summer (1964) and The Endless Summer II (1994), as well as some original interviews with the stars of those films. His first all-original film was Step Into Liquid (2003) followed by a documentary on the Baja 1000 titled Dust to Glory (2005). In 2009, he debuted a new film called Highwater during the 100th anniversary of the Santa Monica Pier; the film follows life on the North Shore and the surfers who compete in the Vans Triple Crown of Surfing. In 2014, the movie On Any Sunday, The Next Chapter continues the saga of motocross documentaries which began with the 1972 Academy Award for Documentary Feature nominated film On Any Sunday (1971). Dust 2 Glory 2018.
