= Step into Liquid =

- Film poster
- Directed by: Dana Brown
- Written by: Dana Brown
- Produced by: John-Paul Beeghly
- Cinematography: John-Paul Beeghly
- Edited by: Dana Brown
- Music by: Richard Gibbs
- Distributed by: Artisan Entertainment
- Release dates: August 5, 2003 (premiere); August 8, 2003 (limited); April 20, 2004 (DVD)
- Running time: 88 minutes
- Country: United States
- Language: English
- Box office: $3.6 million

Step into Liquid is a 2003 American documentary film about surfing directed by Dana Brown, son of surfer and filmmaker Bruce Brown. The film includes surfing footage from the Banzai Pipeline in Hawaii, the beaches of Vietnam, and some of the world's largest waves, at Cortes Bank. The film was Brown's first solo project.

== Production and release ==
The film made $3,681,803 at the box office in the United States.

The documentary is available on DVD, DVD-ROM (in WMVHD HDTV) and Blu-ray Disc. It was first released on April 20, 2004 and marked the final DVD release distributed by Artisan Entertainment.

== Reception ==
On the review aggregator website Rotten Tomatoes, 81% of 77 critics' reviews are positive. The website's consensus reads: "A perfect companion piece to The Endless Summer." Metacritic, which uses a weighted average, assigned the film a score of 72 out of 100, based on 27 critics, indicating "generally favorable" reviews.
