= Bruce Brown (director) =

American filmmaker (1937–2017)

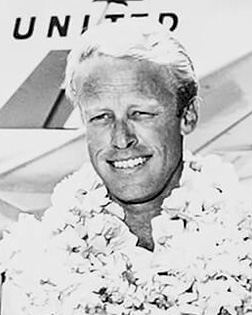
- Brown in the mid-1960s during the making of The Endless Summer
- Born: Bruce Alan Brown; December 1, 1937; San Francisco, California, U.S.
- Died: December 10, 2017 (aged 80); Santa Barbara, California, U.S.
- Occupation: Documentary filmmaker
- Spouse: Patricia Hunter (m. 1960; died 2006)
- Children: Dana Brown, Nancy Brown, and Wade Hunter Brown

Bruce Alan Brown (December 1, 1937 – December 10, 2017) was an American documentary film director, known as an early pioneer of the surf film. He was the father of filmmaker Dana Brown.

== Biography ==
Brown enlisted in the U.S. Navy right after high school, serving on a submarine. He shot his first hobby film photographing surfers from California with an 8mm camera while stationed in Honolulu in 1955. After he was discharged, Brown returned to California and enrolled in Long Beach City College but dropped out to work as a lifeguard.

Brown's films include Slippery When Wet (1958), Surf Crazy (1959), Barefoot Adventure (1960), Surfing Hollow Days (1961), Waterlogged (1962), and his best known film, The Endless Summer (1964), which received nationwide theatrical release in 1966. Considered among the most influential in the genre, The Endless Summer follows surfers Mike Hynson and Robert August around the world. Thirty years later, in 1994, Brown filmed The Endless Summer II with his son Dana.

He also made a number of short films including The Wet Set, featuring the Hobie-MacGregor Sportswear Surf Team and one of the earliest skateboarding films, America's Newest Sport, presenting the Hobie Super Surfer Skateboard Team. These short films, along with some unused footage from The Endless Summer, were included in the DVD Surfin' Shorts, as part of the Golden Years of Surf collection. Brown went beyond surfing a few times with films about motorcycle sport, On Any Sunday (1971), which is held in high regard as one of the best motorcycle documentaries of all time, On Any Sunday II (1981), Baja 1000 Classic (1991), and On Any Sunday: Revisited (2000). He made a guest appearance in the SpongeBob SquarePants episode "SpongeBob SquarePants vs. The Big One".

In 2003, Brown and Alex Mecl revived Bruce Brown Films, LLC to protect Brown's legacy and intellectual property, including his trademarks, copyrights, and vast film archives.

Brown died of natural causes in Santa Barbara, California, nine days after his 80th birthday.

== Posthumous documentary ==
After the death of Brown's wife and filmmaking partner Patricia in 2006, he went into a depression, unable to leave his home. This was a significant change from his previously very active lifestyle. His children, including the eldest, filmmaker Dana Brown, embarked on a camper road trip with the senior Brown to reconnect him with the groundbreaking surfers that had been his friends and compatriots since the 1950s. The trip was filmed, capturing Bruce Brown's return to joy.

Originally planned as a series of webisodes, after Bruce Brown's death the project became a feature-length film, ultimately titled A Life of Endless Summers: The Bruce Brown Story. It was completed in 2020 and featured in the Newport Beach Film Festival's shortened season that August. Due to Covid restrictions, the film was shown at a makeshift drive-in theater at a local mall. The film went on to limited release in a number of film festivals in surfing Meccas.

== Filmography ==
| Year | Title | Director | Writer | Producer | Cinematographer | Editor | Notes |
|---|---|---|---|---|---|---|---|
| 1958 | Slippery When Wet | Yes | Yes | No | Yes | Yes | |
| 1959 | Surf Crazy | Yes | Yes | No | Yes | Yes | |
| 1960 | Barefoot Adventure | Yes | Yes | No | Yes | Yes | |
| 1960 | Surfin' Shorts | Yes | Yes | No | Yes | Yes | |
| 1961 | Surfing Hollow Days | Yes | Yes | No | Yes | Yes | |
| 1962 | Water-Logged | Yes | Yes | No | Yes | Yes | |
| 1965 | The Endless Summer | Yes | Yes | Yes | Yes | Yes | |
| 1966 | America's Newest Sport | Yes | No | No | Yes | No | |
| 1967 | Hare & Hound | Yes | Yes | Yes | Yes | Yes | |
| 1971 | On Any Sunday | Yes | No | Yes | No | No | |
| 1994 | The Endless Summer II | Yes | Yes | No | No | Yes | |
| 2000 | The Endless Summer Revisited | No | No | executive | No | No | |
| 2003 | Step Into Liquid | No | No | executive | No | No | |
| 2014 | On Any Sunday: The Next Chapter | No | No | executive | No | No | |

== Awards and Honors ==
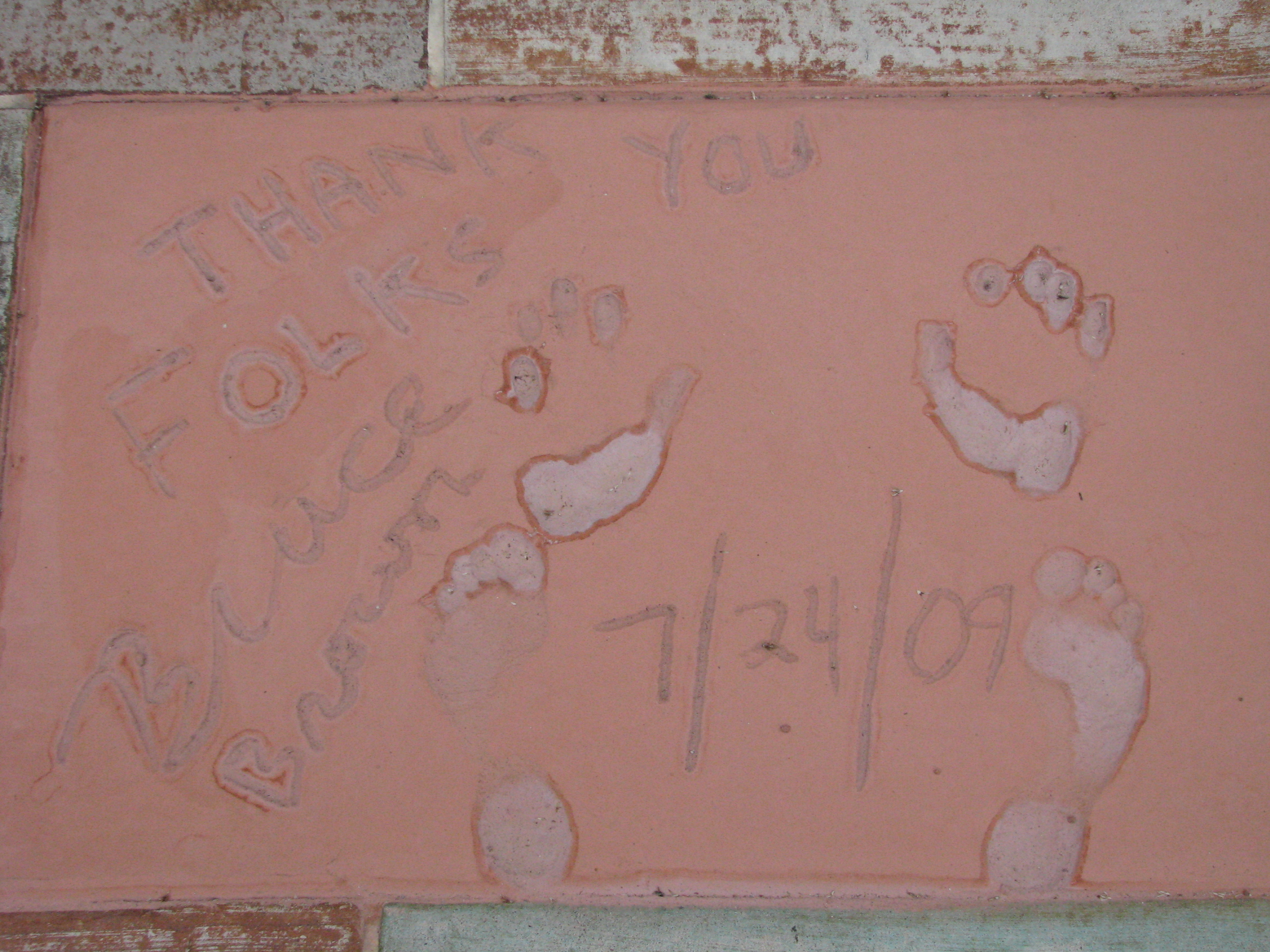
Brown was inducted into the Surfers' Hall of Fame in Huntington Beach, California.

- Inducted into the AMA Motorcycle Hall of Fame in 1999.
- A 2009 inductee into the Surfers' Hall of Fame in Huntington Beach, California.
- On September 19, 2019, the city of Dana Point unveiled a life-size statue of Bruce Brown by William Limebrook, depicted with his camera and tripod, at Watermen's Plaza. It was the second of ten life-size cast bronze statues of famous Dana Point and watersport athletes, surfers, filmmakers, and entrepreneurs.
