= Bianca Valenti =

American big-wave surfer and equal pay activist

Personal information
- Born: Dana Point, California, U.S.
- Years active: 2012–present
- Height: 5 ft 5 in (165 cm)
- Website: bigwavebianca.com

Surfing career
- Sport: Surfing
- Major achievements: 2012 Pipeline Women's Pro – (gold) Winner; 2014 Nelscott Reef Classic – (gold) Winner; 2018 Puerto Escondido Cup – (gold) Winner; 2022–24 Mavericks Awards – (gold) 3× Sweep; 2024 Eddie Aikau (Women's) – (silver) 2nd; 2024 Big Wave Challenge – (gold) Ride of the Year

Surfing specifications
- Stance: Natural (Regular)

Bianca Valenti (born c. 1986) is an American professional big-wave surfer and sports equity activist. She is a co-founder of the Committee for Equity in Women's Surfing (CEWS) and is recognized for her role in achieving equal prize money for women in professional surfing.

== Early life and education ==
Valenti was raised in Dana Point, California. She attended the University of California, Santa Barbara (UCSB), where she was a three-time national champion and captain of the UCSB surf team. She earned a degree in Global Studies in 2007.

== Surfing career ==
Valenti is a specialist in surfing wave faces exceeding 30 feet. She transitioned to big-wave surfing after moving to San Francisco and surfing Ocean Beach.

=== Mavericks and Big Wave Records ===
Valenti has established a multi-year presence at the Mavericks break in California. Between 2022 and 2024, she won "Biggest Wave," "Ride of the Year," and "Performer of the Year" at the Mavericks Surf Awards for three consecutive years. In 2024, she was named the Big Wave Challenge winner for "Women's Ride of the Year" for a wave ridden at Puerto Escondido.

=== The Eddie Aikau Invitational ===
In 2023, Valenti was among the first group of female surfers invited to the Eddie Aikau Big Wave Invitational at Waimea Bay. She competed in the 2024 event, finishing second in the women's division.

== Activism and equal pay ==
In 2016, Valenti co-founded the Committee for Equity in Women's Surfing (CEWS) alongside Paige Alms, Keala Kennelly, and Andrea Moller.

=== Inclusion and equal pay advocacy ===
Valenti's advocacy was highlighted during the campaign to include a women's division in the Mavericks competition, a goal achieved through the California Coastal Commission's permitting process. This movement for inclusion and equal pay was the subject of a 2019 cover story in The New York Times Magazine, which chronicled Valenti's role in the landmark victory for sports equity. In September 2018, the World Surf League (WSL) announced it would provide equal prize money across all its events globally.

== Professional career timeline ==
Year	Event	Result	Citation
2012	Pipeline Women's Pro	(gold) Winner	
2014	Nelscott Reef Big Wave Classic	(gold) Winner	
2018	Puerto Escondido Cup	(gold) Winner	
2022	Mavericks Surf Awards (Performer of the Year)	(gold) Winner	
2023	Mavericks Surf Awards (Biggest Wave)	(gold) Winner	
2024	Eddie Aikau Big Wave Invitational (Women's)	(silver) 2nd Place	
2024	Big Wave Challenge (Women's Ride of the Year)	(gold) Winner	
2024	Mavericks Surf Awards (Sweep)	(gold) Winner	

== Filmography ==
Year	Title	Role	Notes
2017	It Ain't Pretty	Herself	Documentary on Northern California surfing
2017	Tomboy	Herself	NBC Sports documentary
2024	SheChange	Herself	Documentary directed by Sachi Cunningham

== Honors and awards ==
- California Outdoors Hall of Fame (2023 Inductee)
- Honorary Chief of State of California (2023)
- 9× Mavericks Awards Champion (2022–2024)
- Big Wave Challenge winner, "Best Ride of the Year" (2024)
