= Surf Equity =

Sports gender equity advocacy organization

- Founded: 2016 (as Committee for Equity in Women's Surfing)
- Purpose: Gender parity, Equal pay, LGBTQIA+ inclusion in surfing
- Headquarters: San Mateo County, California, U.S.
- Origins: Rebranded from CEWS on June 1, 2020
- Key people: Sabrina Brennan (Executive Director), Bianca Valenti, Keala Kennelly, Paige Alms
- Website: surfequity.org

Surf Equity (formerly the Committee for Equity in Women's Surfing or CEWS) is an American advocacy organization and non-profit dedicated to achieving gender equality, equal pay, and inclusion in professional and recreational surfing. Founded in 2016, the group is credited with establishing the legal and regulatory framework that led the World Surf League (WSL) to adopt global equal prize money. The organization is notable for its pioneering use of the California Coastal Act and the Public Trust Doctrine to mandate equity as a legal condition for the use of public resources.

== History ==
The organization formed in 2016 as the Committee for Equity in Women's Surfing (CEWS) by a coalition of elite big-wave surfers Bianca Valenti, Paige Alms, Keala Kennelly, and Andrea Moller and lead advocate Sabrina Brennan. CEWS argued that professional surfing contests requiring exclusive-use permits for public state waters must adhere to the California Coastal Act's mandate for equal access to the coast. In 2015, Brennan successfully advocated at the California Coastal Commission (CCC) for the inclusion of a women's division at Mavericks, a requirement first implemented in 2016.

In 2018, the World Surf League (WSL) proposed a prize purse of $106,600 for the men's division and $44,400 for the women's division at Mavericks. On July 23, 2018, representatives of CEWS met with WSL CEO Sophie Goldschmidt in Redwood City to demand immediate parity, which the league initially rejected.

CEWS subsequently challenged the event's permit before the California State Lands Commission. Commission staff issued a report stating "the waves do not discriminate" and recommended that a land lease be contingent upon equal prize money. The Commission, chaired by State Controller Betty Yee and including then-Lt. Gov. Gavin Newsom, indicated it would not grant the lease without parity. Facing the loss of their permit, the WSL announced on September 5, 2018, that it would implement global equal prize money for all WSL-controlled events starting in 2019.

CEWS activism and advocacy inspired the introduction and supported the eventual passing of AB 467 ("Equal Pay for Equal Play"), a 2019 California law which mandates equal prize money for all competitions on state lands.

On June 1, 2020, CEWS rebranded as Surf Equity to reflect an expanded mission addressing systemic discrimination, racial equity, and LGBTQIA+ inclusion across all tiers of the sport. The rebrand signaled a shift from big-wave gender parity toward broader social justice and environmental justice advocacy within the surfing community.

Surf Equity successfully advocated for Ordinance 21-16 in Honolulu, a 2021 bill which requires gender equity in permit rules for surfing contests on the North Shore of Oahu, including a mandate for women's divisions.

In May 2024, Surf Equity intervened in the Huntington Beach Longboard Pro to protect the rights of Australian transgender athlete Sasha Jane Lowerson. The CCC ruled that excluding athletes based on gender identity violates the public access policies of the California Coastal Act, establishing a legal precedent for gender identity as a protected category of coastal access.

== Popular culture ==
Surf Equity has been depicted in two films:

- SheChange (2024): Directed by Sachi Cunningham, tracking the founders' legal journey for parity.
- It Ain't Pretty (2017): A documentary by Dayla Soul focusing on the early efforts to gain entry into Mavericks.
