= Paige Alms =

Hawaiian big-wave surfer and equal pay activist

Personal information
- Born: April 6, 1988 (age 37) Victoria, British Columbia, Canada
- Height: 5 ft 8 in (173 cm)

Surfing career
- Sport: Surfing
- Sponsors: Patagonia, Sanuk, Dakine, Yeti, Red Bull, SOS Surfboards

Surfing specifications
- Stance: Regular

Paige Alms (born April 6, 1988) is a Canadian-born Hawaiian big wave surfer and a two-time World Surf League (WSL) Big Wave World Champion. She is widely regarded as a pioneer in women's big wave surfing, becoming the sport's first-ever female world champion in 2016 and the first woman to successfully ride a barrel at Peʻahi (Jaws).

== Early life and education ==
Alms was born in Victoria, British Columbia, and moved to Maui at the age of nine. She began surfing at age ten at Ho'okipa. By age 15, she had surfed her first big wave session at an outer reef on Maui, mentored by surfboard shaper Chris Vandervoort. During her early 20s, she funded her career by working various jobs, including ding repair, house painting, and catering, to maintain her travel and equipment costs.

== Career ==
Alms initially competed on the WSL Qualifying Series, notably winning the Explorer Women's Championship in 2006. However, she eventually transitioned away from small-wave contests to focus exclusively on big wave surfing.

=== Pe'ahi Jaws dominance and World Titles ===
In 2015, Alms gained international acclaim for being the first woman to successfully navigate a barrel at Pe'ahi (Jaws). In 2016, she won the inaugural Pe'ahi Women's Challenge, which secured her the first-ever WSL Women's Big Wave world title. She successfully defended her world champion title in 2017.

In 2023, Alms was part of the historic first group of women to compete in the Eddie Aikau Big Wave Invitational at Waimea Bay. She has remained a top invitee for the 2024–2025 and 2025–2026 seasons, consistently recording the highest scores among female competitors in mixed-gender heats.

=== Equal pay and gender equity advocacy ===
Alms is a founding member of the Committee for Equity in Women's Surfing (CEWS), established in 2016 to secure equal pay and competitive opportunities for female surfers. Alongside Bianca Valenti, Keala Kennelly, and Andrea Moller, Alms advocated the California Coastal Commission to mandate equal prize money for the Mavericks big wave contest.

Their advocacy was instrumental in the WSL's 2018 announcement that it would offer equal prize money for every WSL-controlled event from 2019 onward, making professional surfing the first North American-based sports league to achieve full pay parity.

== Media and public image ==
Alms has appeared on the covers of the New York Times Magazine and California Sunday Magazine. Her journey and activism are the focus of several documentaries:

- The Wave I Ride (2015) – Directed by Devyn Bisson.
- SHEChange (2024) – Directed by Sachi Cunningham, chronicling the decade-long fight for pay equity in surfing.

== Awards and achievements ==
Year	Event/Organization	Award/Title
2015	WSL Big Wave Awards	(gold) Women’s Best Performance
2016	World Surf League	(gold) Big Wave World Champion
2017	World Surf League	(gold) Big Wave World Champion
2017	SIMA	(gold) Waterman of the Year
2022	Red Bull Magnitude	(gold) Winner: Best Paddle & Best Ride
2023	Red Bull Magnitude	(gold) Overall Winner
2024	The Eddie Aikau Invitational	Finalist (Top Female)
2025	The Eddie Aikau Invitational	2025-2026 Invitee
