= Timeline of the gender pay gap in sports =

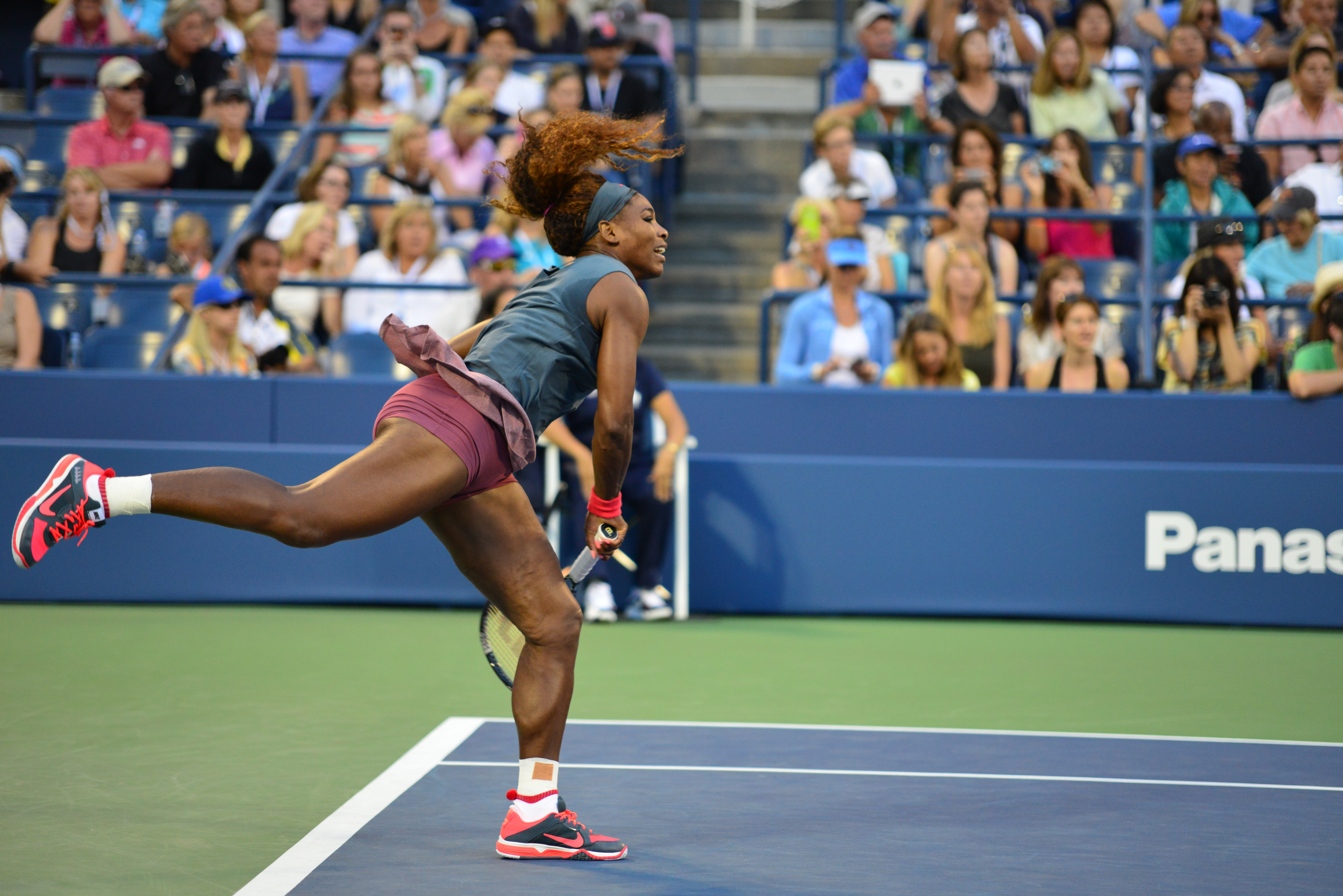
Serena Williams, the highest paid female athlete in 2017. Tennis has offered equal prize money at the four Grand Slams since 2007.

This is a timeline of the gender pay gap in sports, spanning from the 20th century to the 21st century. It includes the major events that resulted in the equal pay of male and female athletes in varying sports across the world. The first major event that got publicity about the gender pay gap in sports was with Billie Jean King at the Italian Open in 1970. The passing of Title IX in 1972 generated a wave of female participation in athletics, as well as increased funding for female sports. Following their win of the 2015 FIFA World Cup, the US Women's Soccer Team highlighted gender discrimination in sport and brought about another movement towards achieving equal pay in sports.

== 20th century ==
=== 1970s ===
1970 – Billie Jean King was awarded $600, while her male counterpart, Ilie Nastase, was awarded $3,500 at the Italian Open.

1972 – Billie Jean King was awarded $10,000, while Ilie Nastase was awarded $25,000 at the US Open.

1972 – Richard Nixon's administration passed Title IX. Title IX protects individuals from discrimination on the basis of sex.

1973 – Billie Jean King threatened to boycott the US Open due to unequal pay; US Open becomes the first Grand Slam to offer equal prize money.

=== 1980s ===
1989 – The International Triathlon Union began paying equal prize money to men and women in every race.

=== 1990s ===
1995 – Australian Open stopped giving equal prize money due to a lack of interest in women's tennis.

== 21st century ==
=== 2000s ===
2001 – Australian Open reinstated equal pay.

2006 – World Archery began to offer equal prize money to male and female athletes.

2007 – Wimbledon agrees to equal pay, which meant that all four Grand Slams would give out equal prize money to male and female competitors.

2007 – Venus Williams becomes the first women's wimbledon champion to earn as much as the men's champion, Roger Federer.

=== 2010s ===
2014 – Le Tour de France offered La Course, which is a women's event that offers the same prize money as a man does for winning the Tour.

2015 – US Women's Soccer Team won the 2015 FIFA World Cup and collectively received $6 million less than the US Men's Soccer Team, which lost in the first round of knockouts.

2016 – After their 2015 FIFA World Cup win, five members of the US Women's Soccer Team (Carli Loyd, Hope Solo, Alex Morgan, Megan Rapinoe, and Becky Sauerbrunn) filed a wage discrimination complaint with the Equal Employment Opportunity Commission against the US Soccer Federation.

2016 – Surfers Andrea Moller, Bianca Valenti, Keala Kennelly, Paige Alms, Karen Tynan, and Sabrina Brennan, founded the Commission for Equity in Women's Surfing. It aims to increase the number of events and number of awards for women, as well as offer equal prize money.

2017 – Norway Football Federation agrees deal to pay male and female international footballers equally.

2017 – The US Women's National Hockey Team threatened to boycott the World Championship over a wage dispute with US Hockey. About a week later, the US Women's National Hockey Team agreed to a four-year deal with US Hockey, which guaranteed fair pay and the same benefits that the US Men's National Hockey Team receives.

2017 – Members of the Republic of Ireland National Women's football team threaten to go on strike over the lack of financial remuneration for players on international duty and access to adequate facilities.

2018 – No women were listed in Forbes 100 highest paid athletes.

2018 – New Zealand's men and women national football teams receive equal pay and working conditions under a new collective bargaining agreement.

2018 – World Surf League announced that it would provide equal prize money to the male and female athletes in all of their events, starting in 2019.

2018 – Women's National Basketball Players Association opted out of their collective bargaining agreement.

2018 – On International Women's Day, the International Olympic Committee announced their proposal of the Gender Equality Review Project, which outlined 25 recommendations to achieve gender equality in sports. Three of them were related to funding.

2019 – Equal Employment Opportunity Commission allowed members of the US Women's Soccer Team to sue since no progress had been made with the US Soccer Federation.

2019 – On International Women's Day, 28 members of the US Women's Soccer Team filed a lawsuit against the US Soccer Federation stating that the players faced gender-based discrimination in almost every aspect of their employment.

=== 2020s ===
2020 – WNBA players received a 53% raise, paid maternity leave and fertility benefits, and improved travel conditions.

2020 – The FA confirms that the England women's and men's national football teams receive the same pay.

2020 – Brazilian Football Confederation announced that men and women will be paid the same amount for representing the national team.

2021 – An equal pay deal with the FAI means players of the Republic of Ireland Women's football team will receive the same pay as players of the Republic of Ireland Men's football team.

2022 – The U.S. Soccer Federation agreed to an equal pay deal with both the women’s and men's national soccer team.

2023 – An equal pay deal with the FAW means players of the Wales Women's football team will receive the same pay as players of the Wales Men's football team.
