= Jeff Clark (surfer) =

American surfer

Jeff Clark (born March 26, 1957, in Redwood City, California) is one of the most noteworthy big-wave surfers, famous for surfing Mavericks alone for 15 years before it was widely discovered by the big-wave surfing community.

Born in Redwood City, Clark moved with his family to Miramar Beach in Half Moon Bay when he was a young boy. He soon began surfing and seeking out bigger, stronger waves along the rugged Northern California coast. In the winter, Clark and his friends could see the large waves off Pillar Point breaking from the hillside of Half Moon Bay High School. After carefully studying the conditions, Clark paddled out at Mavericks at the age of 17, leaving behind his high school friend who declined the adventure and instead told Clark he would "call the Coast Guard and tell them where I last saw you." He surfed Mavericks alone for the next 15 years before he could get others to surf it with him (although several would paddle out, none would take on the massive waves). Since then, his name has become linked to Mavericks for his dedication to the spot without wave models or water patrol. Additionally, Clark shapes his boards specifically for the conditions at Mavericks and every type of surf condition and ability.

Clark is among the few ambidextrous big wave surfers in the world. Others in this category include Todd Smith and Andy Littenstall, who both also surf at Mavericks. A natural goofyfooter, Jeff spent ten years learning to ride regularfoot. This allowed him to ride frontside (facing the wave) when he started taking on the more dangerous right-breaking waves at Mavericks.

Labeled one of the "world's best big-wave riders" by Surfer Magazine in 1994, Clark, along with Mavericks and the Half Moon Bay surf scene, has been featured in such films as Riding Giants and Adventures in Wild California. He is the only surfer in the San Mateo County Sports Hall of Fame.

In 2015, Clark celebrated 40 years of surfing Mavericks. He continues to surf big waves, including Mavericks, and any type of wave, big or small. In the past decade, Clark has also honed his skills in Stand-Up Paddle surfing and board shaping, SUP surfing all conditions including massive waves at Mavericks.

Clark founded the annual Mavericks Surf Contest with surf clothing manufacturer Quiksilver in 1998 and later joined forces with Evolve Sports, a San Francisco-based sports marketing group. Most recently, a small group of Half Moon Bay surfers and business owners joined to organize and present the contest, and in 2014 formed a licensing agreement with Cartel Management for the promotion, branding and sponsorships of the event. The contest is now known as Titans of Mavericks.

Clark is recognized as one of the premier big wave surfboard shapers in the country and shapes a full line of custom surfboards and SUPs. He owns shops Mavericks Surf Company and Mavericks PaddleSports. Clark holds a patent in surfboard design and developed and now produces with Quatic the Clark Inflatable Life Vest for extreme water sports safety.

Clark often travels to pursue big waves, and often gives motivational speeches for groups and companies. Fans often encounter Jeff at his family-run shops in Half Moon Bay and meets with surfers to design custom boards.

== See also ==
- Laird Hamilton
- Greg Noll
