= Luke Shepardson =

American lifeguard and surfer

Luke Shepardson is an American lifeguard and surfer. He won the Eddie Aikau Big Wave Invitational in 2023.

== Early life ==
Shepardson is from the North Shore of Oahu. He participated in the Hawaiʻi Amateur Surfing Association and was given the nickname "Casual Luke."

== Career ==
Shephardson is a career lifeguard.

== Competition ==
In 2023 Shepardson won the Eddie Aikau Big Wave Invitational (The Eddie). The Eddie is the premier big wave surfing event, waves must be at least 30 feet in order for the event to be held. Due to the wave height requirement the event had not been held since 2016. His combined score was 89.1 on a 90 point scale. Shepardson competed at the event during his lunch break with his boss's permission. More than 50,000 spectators attended the 2023 event. Shepardson won a prize of Hawaiian Airlines miles and $10,000 cash which was criticized by many in the community for being a smaller prize than previous winners had gotten especially considering the scale of the event and its promotion. Many responded to the perceived slight by sending money directly to Shepardson's personal venmo account, although this was not requested by Shepardson or his family who are very private.

As the 2023 winner Shepardson was invited to the 2024-2025 event should it occur. At the 2024-2025 Eddie Aikau Big Wave Invitational Shepardson did well in the first heat but eventually came 6th.

== Honors ==
Honolulu Mayor Rick Blangiardi proclaimed a Luke Shepardson Day following his 2023 win.
