= Darryl Virostko =

American surfer

Darryl "Flea" Virostko (born December 25, 1971) was a professional "big wave" surfer from Santa Cruz, California. He graduated from Santa Cruz High School in 1991. He is a three-time Mavericks competition winner. Virostko appears as himself in the surfing films Riding Giants, Step Into Liquid, and Billabong Odyssey. Surfer declared his 2004 wipeout on a 50-foot wave at Waimea Bay, Hawaii, the "Wipeout of the Decade".

As of 2009 Virostko was a recovering addict, and runs a program, "FleaHab", to teach other recovering addicts how to surf and be active while learning a new way of life. He starred in The Westsiders a documentary film by Josh Pomer that chronicles his difficult upbringing and addiction to drugs, on the west side of Santa Cruz. As of 2011-2014 Darryl is a father of two girls.

Wendy Edwards collided with Darryl in a motor vehicle crash while driving highway 1 northbound On January 10,2022. Wendy fled the scene of the accident and jumped off a 300 ft. cliff into the ocean resulting in her death.
