= Sonny Miller =

American film director (1960–2014)

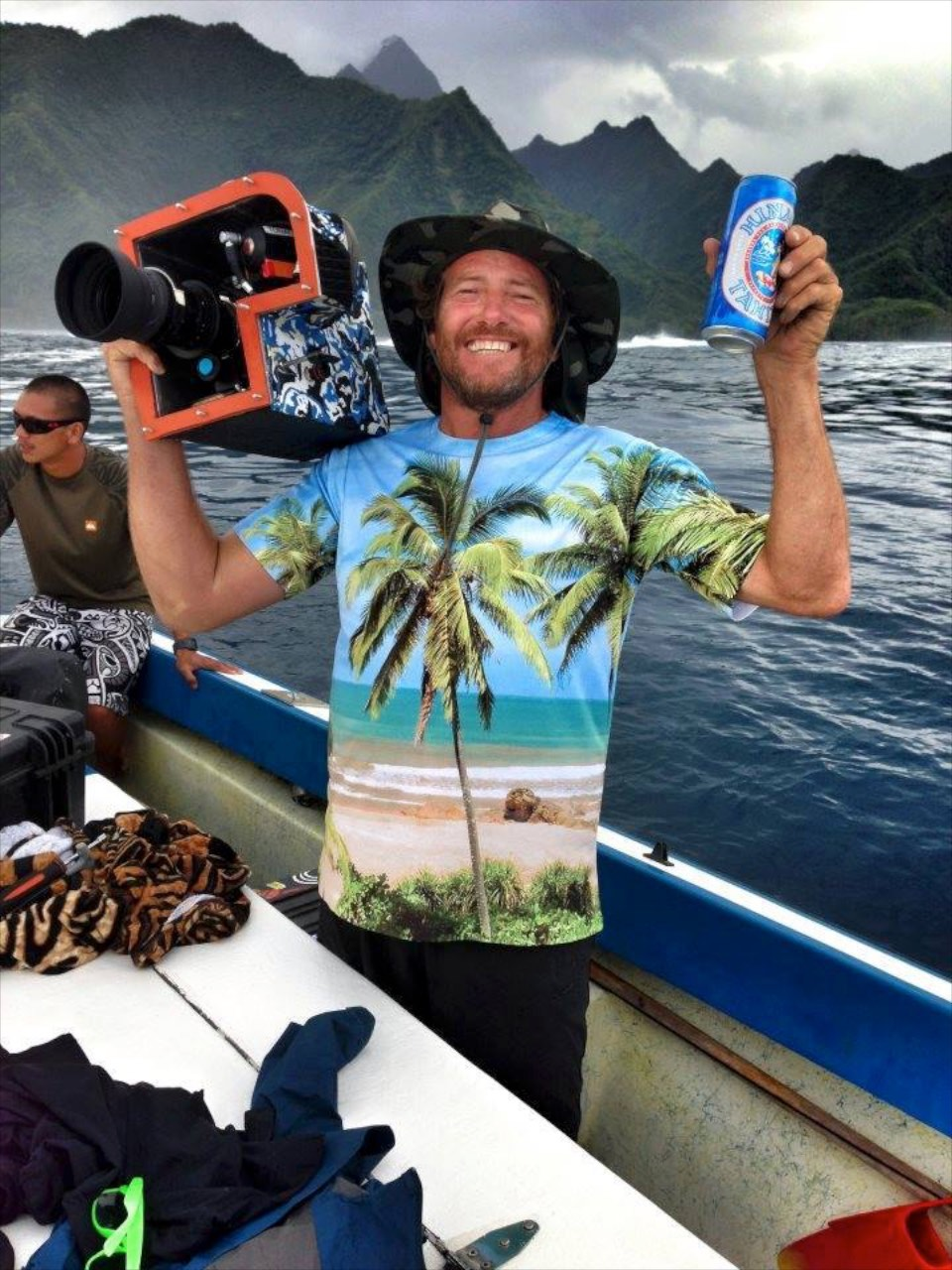
- Sonny Miller enjoying a beer after a long filming session at Teahupo'o

Personal information
- Nickname: Cap'n Fun
- Born: Sonny Miller; July 18, 1960 San Jose, California
- Died: July 8, 2014 (aged 53) La Jolla, California

Surfing career
- Sport: Surfing
- Sponsors: Rip Curl
- Major achievements: Searching for Tom Curren; Video of the Year by Surfer Magazine in 1997.

Sonny Miller (July 18, 1960 – July 8, 2014) was an American cinematographer and waterman specializing in surfing and nature photography. He achieved success filming surfing related dramas, In God's Hands (1998). Riding Giants (2004), The Big Bounce (2004), Lords of Dogtown (2005), Blue Crush (2002) and Die Another Day. Miller experienced a heart attack and could not be revived just one week after the death of his mother, Suzanne Gilliland. Married to Debra Levinson (1999-2009)

== Early life ==
Born in San Jose, California in 1960, Miller moved to Encinitas, California, sometime prior to 1971, where he learned to surf. He attended San Dieguito High School and studied photography at Palomar College. His career began with the accepted submission of still surfing photographs to Surfer and Breakout magazines, he was also a contributor to Snowboard Magazine with his work appearing on the début cover. Miller soon expanded into 16 mm film for motion photography.

== Career ==
Also known as Cap'n Fun, Miller and Tom Curren teamed to produce the series, The Search (1992). Filmed and directed by Miller, the series would travel the world and focus on Curran's freestyle surfing as most of the footage at the time, focused on Curren in competition. Miller's surfing documentaries include: Breakin’ on Thru (1992), The Search (1992), The Search II (1993), For the Sea (1994), Beyond the Boundaries (1994), Feral Kingdom (1995), Aloha Bowls (1996), Tripping the Planet (1996) and Searching for Tom Curren, which was awarded Video of the Year by Surfer magazine in 1997.

In 2000, Miller's work began to include Hollywood feature films, his work includes, In God's Hands (1998), Blue Crush (2002), Riding Giants (2004), The Big Bounce (2004), Lords of Dogtown (2005) and the James Bond film, Die Another Day. He appeared onscreen opposite Michelle Rodriguez and Kate Bosworth as a surf contest announcer in Blue Crush, and his work is said to appear in the remake of Point Break (2015).

In 2014, it was announced that Helen Hunt's, Ride, Miller's final film, would be dedicated in remembrance of Miller. In 2015, Hunt memorialised her friend and their experiences in "Sonny Miller's Lesson for Us All: 'Nature Dictates'", for the Huffington Post. At the time of his death, Miller was filming, Ricochet Surf Dog for an ESPN feature, a story of a service-dog whose balance helps to allow the disabled to enjoy the experience surfing.

== Film vs videotape ==
Miller was known to have a preference for film over videotape and the (16 mm film) format likely due to its compact size for action filming. Film boasts distinct differences in contrast, resolution, color and unlike videotape, 16-millimeter could also be filmed in slow-motion. Miller's work was transferred to videotape after editing.

Helen Hunt recalls, "He carried this box, this box that paid for his house, and his motorcycles and his dying mom's care, and his food and his way of life. I don't know what that was, his way of life, but I heard rumors it included putting up friends and their babies who found themselves between places to live, five dogs, that sort of thing. All paid for by this box he made to make movies in the water. That thing never left his side. I took him to breakfast once, and he brought it to the table."

The box that Hunt refers to is the waterproof camera housings that Miller specialized in. In a recently discovered interview of Miller, filmed at his home and workshop coined "Rancho Relaxo", in Escondido California, Miller displays a collection of waterproof housings containing various 16 mm, 35 mm, videotape, high-definition and high-speed cameras.

- "Sonny Miller, one of surfing's finest lensmen." Surfer Magazine

== Awards ==
Year	Nominee / work	Award	Result
1997	Searching for Tom Curren	Surfer magazine's Video of the Year	Won
2006	X Games Eleven: Surfing	Sports Emmy Award for Outstanding Camera Work	Nominated
2007	ESPN: Down the Barrel	Sports Emmy Award Outstanding Camera Work; Shared with: Jeff Alred, Brian Brousseau, Samson Chan, Pascal Charpentier, Daren Crawford, Matt Goodman, Mark Healy, Craig Hoffman, Trent Kamerman, Maik Kuhne, Garrett McNamara, Joel Parkinson, Per Peterson, Michael Prickett, Kelly Slater, Mike Stewart, Raimana Van-Bastolae	Won
