= Greg Noll =

American surfer and board shaper (1937–2021)

Personal information
- Born: Greg Lawhead; February 11, 1937 San Diego, California, U.S.
- Died: June 28, 2021 (aged 84) Crescent City, California
- Years active: 1957–1969

Surfing career
- Sport: Surfing

Surfing specifications
- Stance: Regular
- Quiver: Long boards, Guns
- Favorite waves: Banzai Pipeline

Greg Noll (né Lawhead; February 11, 1937 – June 28, 2021) was an American pioneer of big wave surfing and a prominent longboard shaper. Nicknamed "Da Bull" by Phil Edwards in reference to his physique and way of charging down the face of a wave, he was on the U.S. lifeguard team that introduced Malibu boards to Australia around the time of the 1956 Summer Olympics in Melbourne. He produced a "legendary" series of five Search for Surf films.

== Early life ==
Noll was born Greg Lawhead in San Diego, California, on February 11, 1937. He subsequently adopted the surname of his stepfather, Ash. At the age of three, Noll moved with his family to Manhattan Beach, California. He began surfing at the age of 11 in the South Bay. He was a member of Manhattan Beach Surf Club where he learned board shaping from Dale Velzy. Noll was a member of the Los Angeles County Lifeguards and competed in paddleboarding. Noll developed his big wave surfing off Palos Verdes at breaks such as Lunada Bay. He moved to Hawaii in 1954, where he finished high school, and lived and surfed at Makaha.

== Big waves ==
Noll became known for his exploits in large Hawaiian surf on the North Shore of Oahu. In November 1957, he surfed Waimea Bay in 25–30 ft surf; at the time, this was thought to be impossible, even by the local Hawaiians. He was the first surfer to ride a wave breaking on the outside reef at Banzai Pipeline in November 1964.

The wave I caught at Outside Pipeline that day walled up twenty-five-feet high about half a mile in front of me. It broke to the left, so I was riding with my back to the wave, goofyfoot, and it was a god-awful uneasy feeling. Instead of getting smaller as I rode it, the sonofabitch grew on me. It got bigger and bigger, and I started going faster and faster, until I was absolutely locked into it. I felt like I was on a spaceship racing into a void. At first, I could hear my board chattering across the face of the wave in a constant rhythm. As my speed increased, the chattering noise became less frequent. Suddenly there was no noise. For about fifteen or twenty feet, I was airborne. Then I literally was blown off my board.

— Greg Noll, Da Bull: Life Over the Edge

Noll was readily identified in film footage while surfing by his now iconic black and white horizontally striped "jailhouse" boardshorts. It was later at Makaha, in December 1969, that he rode what many at the time believed to be the largest wave ever surfed. After that wave and the ensuing wipeout during the course of that spectacular ride down the face of a massive dark wall of water, his surfing tapered off and he closed his Hermosa Beach shop in the early 1970s. He later moved to Northern California and first worked as a commercial fisherman, before becoming a sport fishing guide.

The surfing exploits of Noll and other big wave legends were chronicled in the 2004 documentary Riding Giants. He also provided his perspective on Hawaiian big wave surfing on the commentary track for DVD, along with Laird Hamilton and Jeff Clark.

The filmmakers of the 1964 surf drama Ride the Wild Surf were so impressed by his exploits while they were shooting footage of surfers on the North Shore surfing Mecca of Hawaii before returning to California to film the movie that they created the movie's character Eskimo based on footage featuring him, dressing the character in Noll's famous black & white "jailhouse stripe" boardshorts.

== Board shaping ==
Having shaped surfboards since his youth, and having founded his own surfboard business in the 1950s which reached a high level of commercial success, Noll then changed careers and spent two decades in commercial fishing. The resurgence of longboards brought him back to resume shaping and organize events. He lived in Hiouchi, California with his wife and started a business called "Noll Surfboards" that shaped re-creations of some of the historic boards from the sport of surfing.

== Personal life ==
Noll had four children — sons Tate and Rhyn by his first wife, Beverly; daughter Ashlyne and son Jed by his second wife, Laura Archuletta, to whom he was married until his death.

Noll resided in Crescent City, California, during his later years. He died on June 28, 2021, at the age of 84.

== Works ==
- Kampion, Drew & Noll, Greg. Greg Noll: The Art of the Surfboard, 2007, published by: Gibbs Smith, Layton, Utah, ISBN 978-1-58685-776-9
- Noll, Greg & Gabbard, Andrea. Da Bull: Life Over the Edge, 1989, North Atlantic Books, Berkeley, Calif., ISBN 1-55643-143-0
