= Gender pay gap in sports =

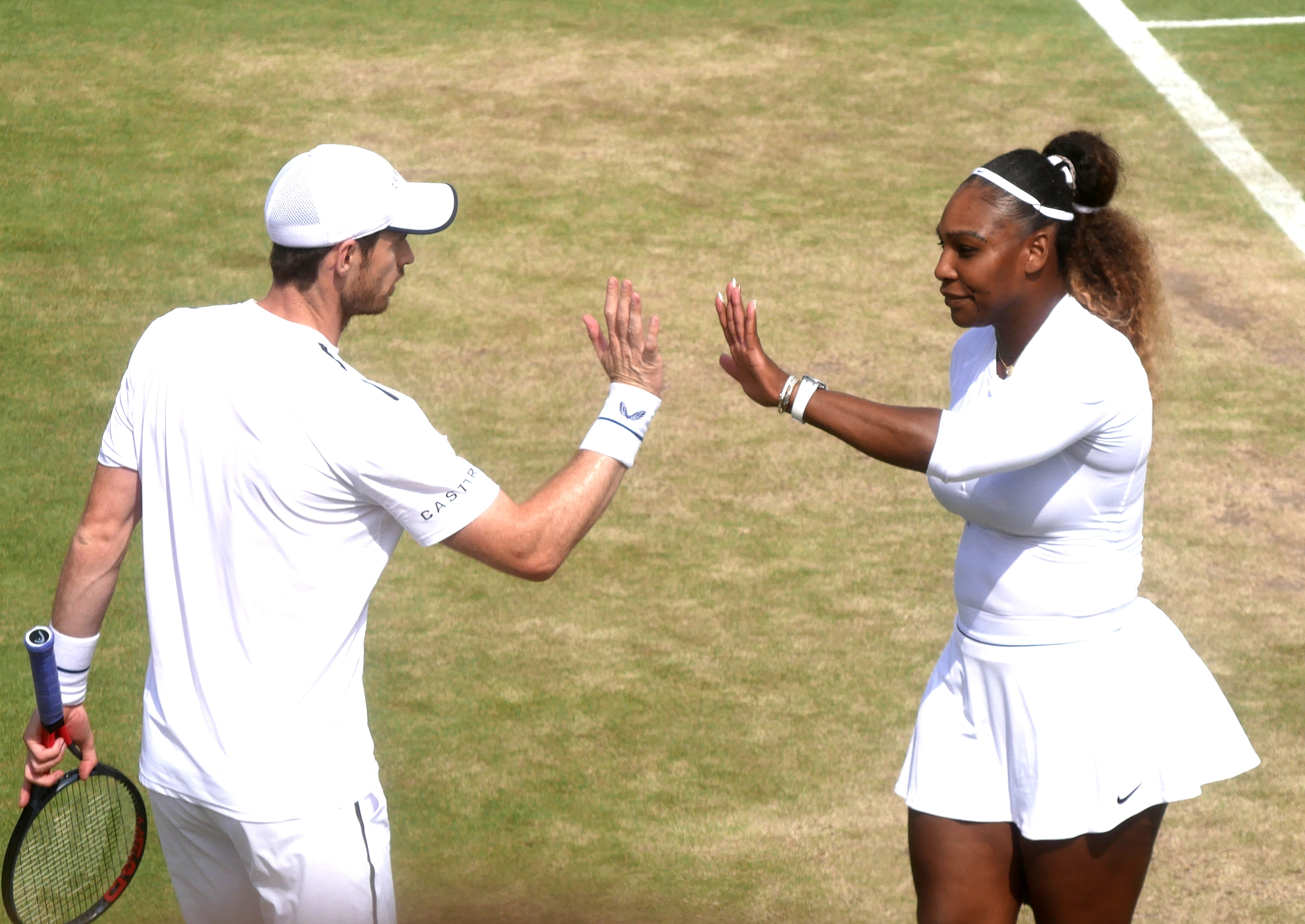
Murray and Williams Wimbledon 2019

Gender pay gap in sports is the persistence of unequal pay in sports, particularly for female athletes who do not receive equal revenue compared to their counterparts, which differs depending on the sport. According to the research conducted by BBC, "a total of 83% of sports now reward men and women equally". A similar situation also occurred in 2017, where there was only one female athlete – tennis player Serena Williams – who joined the list and ranked No.56. Billie Jean King brought awareness to the issue of unequal pay in the early 1970s, when she was awarded $2,900 less than her male counterpart at the Italian Open. The timeline of the gender pay gap in sports displays the significant events that have occurred since the 1970s.

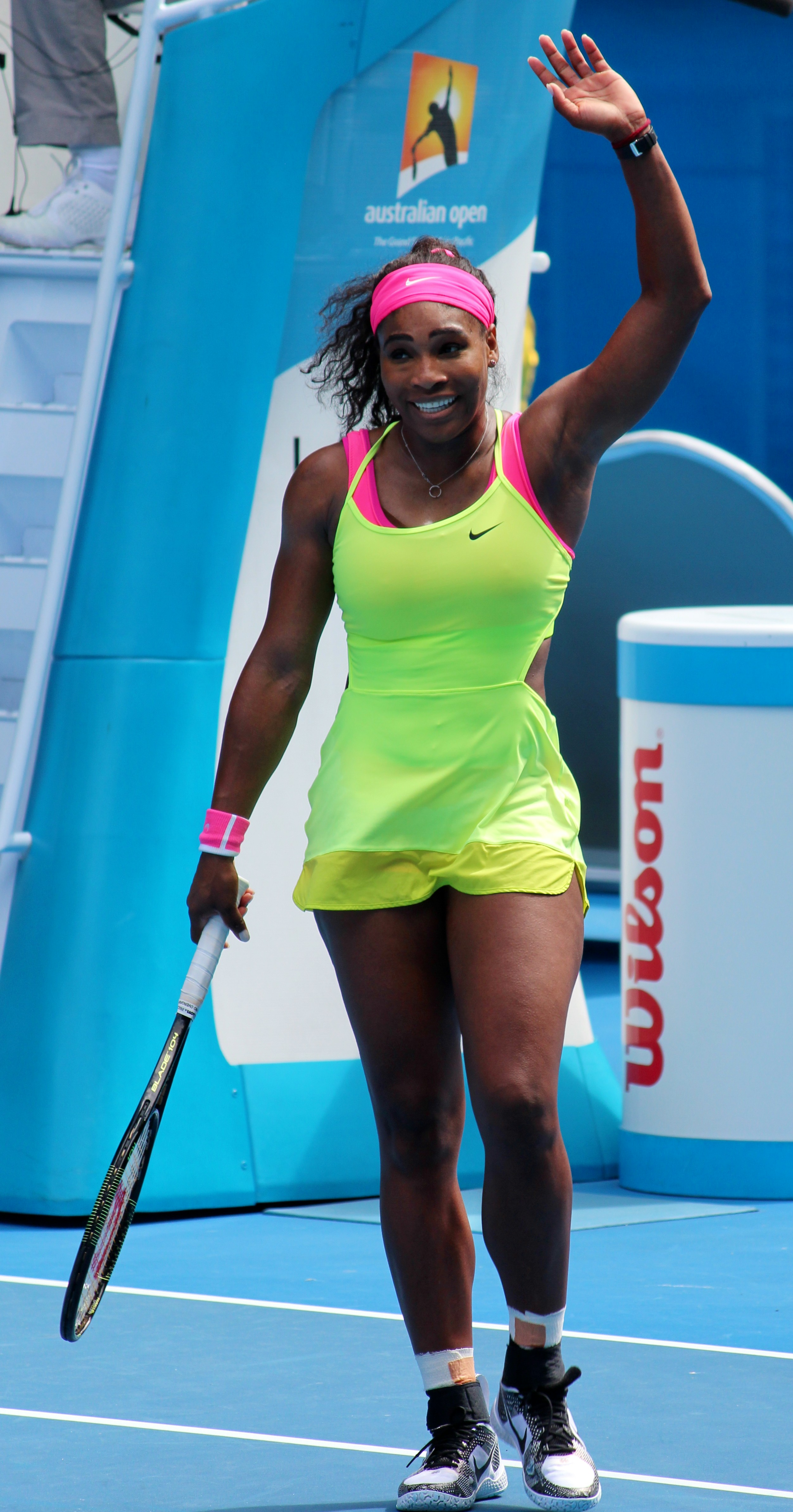
Serena Williams, the highest-paid female athlete in 2017

== Factors ==
For classic definition, the gender pay gap in sports refers to the enduring disparity in earnings between male and female athletes across various levels and types of sport. Despite advancements towards gender equality, this gap remains pronounced, influenced by factors such as media coverage, sponsorship, and public engagement. In this article we will explore the extent, causes, and consequences of the gender pay gap in sports, drawing on recent research to highlight both progress and ongoing challenges that factor into the reasoning behind pay inequality.

Definition and Overview

The gender pay gap in sports is defined as the systematic disparity in earnings between male and female athletes. This gap is very apparent in society across prize money, salaries, sponsorship deals, and other financial incentives in both amateur and professional sports. The gender pay gap not only reflects differences in pay for similar achievements and participation but also the broader issues in sports infrastructure, opportunities, and media representation. The importance of addressing this issue extends beyond the simple realm of sports, as it touches on broader societal values regarding gender equality and fairness. The persistence of the pay gap highlights ongoing challenges in achieving equality, despite progress in other areas of gender issues. Research, including a comprehensive analysis published in PLOS ONE, reveals that disparities in sports are a microcosm of wider societal gaps, influenced by traditional gender roles, media coverage biases, and differing commercial interests.

In sports, this issue is particularly prominent in contexts where male athletes are often deemed more 'marketable' due to higher viewership numbers and greater media coverage, which in turn drives sponsorship and advertising revenue. Consequently, this perpetuates a cycle of underinvestment in women's sports, limiting their exposure and the growth of female athletic programs. Moreover, the pay gap is not just a measure of monetary inequality but also reflects disparities in respect, recognition, and resources between male and female athletes. Understanding and addressing the gender pay gap in sports is important for fostering a sports culture that values and promotes gender equality, ensuring that future generations of athletes receive fair compensation and recognition regardless of gender. This overview sets the stage for a deeper examination of the factors contributing to the pay gap, current efforts to bridge this divide, and strategies to ensure equitable treatment and opportunities for all athletes.

Historical Context

Historically, professional sports were male-dominated arenas, with women facing institutional and societal barriers that limited their participation and recognition. Early female athletes contended with substantial inequalities, constrained by societal norms about gender-appropriate activities.A pivotal moment in the pursuit of gender equality in sports was the enactment of Title IX in the United States in 1972, mandating equal funding for both sexes in educational programs receiving federal funding, including sports. As discussed in the International Journal of Constitutional Law, Title IX is the Education Amendment of 1972 which prohibits sex-based discrimination in any school or any other education program that receives funding from the federal government. It significantly increased female participation in sports and set a legal precedent that influenced professional sports globally, challenging institutional barriers and reshaping public and commercial support for women's sports. Then came the establishment of women's professional leagues in the late 20th century which marked a breakthrough, offering platforms for female athletes to compete professionally. Despite this progress, these leagues faced ongoing challenges with unequal funding, media coverage, and public support, as noted in the article, highlighting the persistent struggles within professional sports environments.

Recent decades have seen a surge in advocacy led by high-profile athletes and teams, focusing on legal battles and public campaigns for equal pay. These efforts have brought increased awareness to the systemic issues contributing to the pay gap, including disparities in media representation and commercial investment. Internationally, the implementation of gender equality in sports varies widely. The article provided a comparative analysis, revealing how different legal and cultural contexts impact the pursuit of equity in sports, with some countries making significant strides and others lagging behind.

Current State of the Gender Pay Gap

The gender pay gap in sports exemplifies profound disparities, notably in soccer and basketball, where men's earnings far surpass those of women. In professional soccer, for example, the gap extends from significant differences in World Cup prize money to unequal pay at the club level, impacting athletes across all tiers of the sport. Similarly, in basketball, the salary cap in the NBA vastly exceeds that of the WNBA, forcing many female athletes to play overseas to earn a comparable income. These examples, highlighted in Frontiers in Sports and Active Living, illustrate not only the economic but also the valuation disparities between men's and women's sports.

Media coverage plays a critical role in this ongoing issue, as it significantly influences public interest and commercial investments. According to a study in PLOS ONE, the limited exposure women's sports receive compared to men directly affects revenue streams such as sponsorships, broadcasting rights, and merchandise sales. This diminished media presence contributes to a cycle of reduced earnings for female athletes, which further entrenches the gender pay gap.

Despite these challenges, there are signs of incremental progress through various initiatives aimed at reducing the pay disparity. These include equalizing prize money in some sports, improving sponsorship opportunities for women, and efforts to boost media coverage of women's events. While these steps are positive, the pace of change remains slow, and the pay gap persists, reflecting broader societal issues related to gender equality in sports.

Efforts to Bridge the Gap

A significant contributor to the gender pay gap in sports is the media coverage discrepancy between men's and women's sports. Studies have shown that women's sports receive substantially less coverage than men's, which in turn affects public interest and commercial investments. According to the research in PLOS ONE, this lack of visibility reduces sponsorship opportunities and diminishes revenue from broadcasting rights, which are crucial for funding sports leagues and athletes. The cycle of limited exposure and lower earnings perpetuates the financial inequalities between male and female athletes.

Another key factor is the disparity in sponsorship and commercial interests. Businesses tend to invest more in men's sports due to their higher visibility and larger fan bases, as discussed in the article. This investment bias is not only evident in direct sponsorships but also affects the allocation of endorsements and advertising dollars, which significantly contribute to athletes' incomes. Without comparable commercial backing, women's sports struggle to compete on an equal financial footing with men's sports.

Together, these elements create a challenging environment for closing the gender pay gap in sports. The relationship between media representation and commercial success is pivotal, emphasizing the need for a strategic shift towards more equitable media coverage and sponsorship practices to foster financial equality in sports.

Case Studies

The gender pay gap in sports is vividly illustrated through case studies from a variety of sports, each highlighting both progress and ongoing challenges. For example, tennis has emerged as a leader in addressing pay inequality. Major tournaments such as Wimbledon and the US Open have achieved pay parity between male and female players, a result of decades of advocacy and evolving public perceptions about gender equity in sports. This achievement is not mirrored in all sports, however, with significant disparities still prevalent in others like soccer and basketball.

In professional soccer, the FIFA Women's World Cup provides a stark example of the pay gap. Despite increasing popularity and record-breaking viewership, the prize money awarded to women's teams is just a fraction of what their male counterparts receive. This discrepancy extends beyond prize money to include lower wages and less support at the club level, impacting the overall development of the sport for women. Similarly, in basketball, the wage disparity between the NBA and WNBA is significant, with NBA salaries dwarfing those in the WNBA, forcing many female players to seek competitive play in international leagues during the off-season.

These case studies, drawn from extensive research including articles in Frontiers in Sports and Active Living, show that while some sports like tennis have made notable progress towards pay equity, others reveal the persistent challenges. The different trajectories in these sports underscore the need for a multifaceted approach to addressing the pay gap, involving policy changes, increased media coverage, and greater commercial investment in women's sports.

Future Outlook

The outlook for narrowing the gender pay gap in sports hinges on sustained advocacy, strategic investments, and broader cultural changes that value women's sports equally. Legal advancements and policies promoting gender equality, as discussed in the International Journal of Constitutional Law, are anticipated to have a profound impact. Furthermore, the increasing public interest in women's sports, propelled by successful global events and enhanced by digital media platforms, suggests potential for growth in commercial investments and sponsorships. This could elevate the financial status of female athletes, as explored in the Columbia Journal of Law & the Arts.

Conclusion

In sum, the gender pay gap in sports, while persistent, shows signs of potential closure if current trends continue and efforts are intensified. The advancements in legal frameworks highlighted in the International Journal of Constitutional Law, alongside the rising cultural acceptance and commercial viability of women's sports detailed in the Columbia Journal of Law & the Arts, provide a foundation for optimism. To achieve meaningful and lasting change, a concerted effort from all sectors involved in sports is essential. This includes not only addressing direct pay discrepancies but also increasing media coverage, enhancing sponsorship opportunities, and ensuring equitable treatment in all aspects of sports management and culture. With a unified approach, the sports world can move closer to a future where gender parity is not the exception but the norm.

=== Endorsement deals ===
Male sports attract far more viewership and are in far higher demand than women's sports. The majority of sports are also dominated by males, and this is due to several factors.

The first factor is the fewer chances for female athletes to negotiate endorsement deals. Assuming a male and female athlete receive equal prize money, generally speaking, the top male athletes earn more due to better sponsorship and endorsement deals. Research conducted by a United Kingdom organization shows that sponsors are more attracted by male athletes as male athletes tend to be more marketable. A study has found that female athletes are rarely employed as the spokesperson by companies. Between 2011 and 2013, another study found female sports to account for 0.4% of total sports sponsorships. The imbalance of endorsement deals expands the income gap between male and female athletes. A comparison of Roger Federer's income with Serena Williams' income based on their prize money shows that Williams earned $2 million more than Federer. However, Federer is the most lucrative athlete endorsement and makes $58 million, which is five times more than Serena Williams.

Attendance

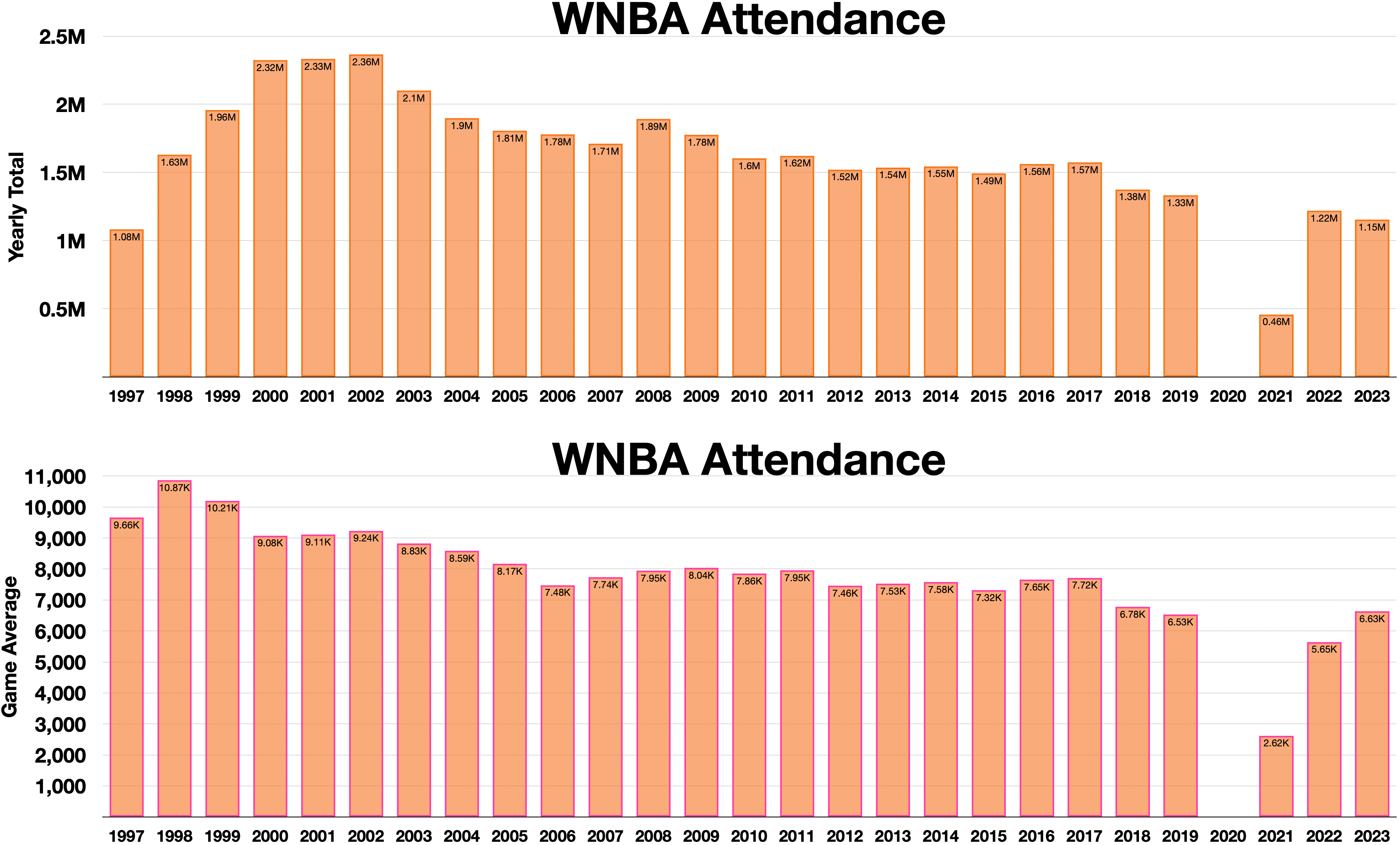
Average WNBA attendance from 1997–2023. Top graph shows total attendance by season. Bottom graph shows average attendance per game.

The attendance between the NBA and WNBA is significantly large. In the 2022/23 NBA season, the average attendance for an NBA game was approximately 18,000 fans. In the WNBA, it was just a third of that, approximately 6,000. This would lead to teams potentially losing profit and losing out on revenue and why only very few teams make a profit after each season. Despite the support from women's basketball organizations and the attention brought by celebrities such as Woodard, Nolan Ryan, Snoop Dogg, Michael B. Jordan, and Travis Scott, a significant disparity in salaries remains. For instance, Caitlin Clark concluded an extraordinary, record-breaking year by scoring her 3,668th point, making her the highest scorer in NCAA Division history, both men's and women's, as of April 2024. However, her salary stands at just $338,056 over the next four years, a mere fraction of the $55 million contract signed by Victor Wembanyama, the previous year's top NBA draft pick.

=== Media coverage ===
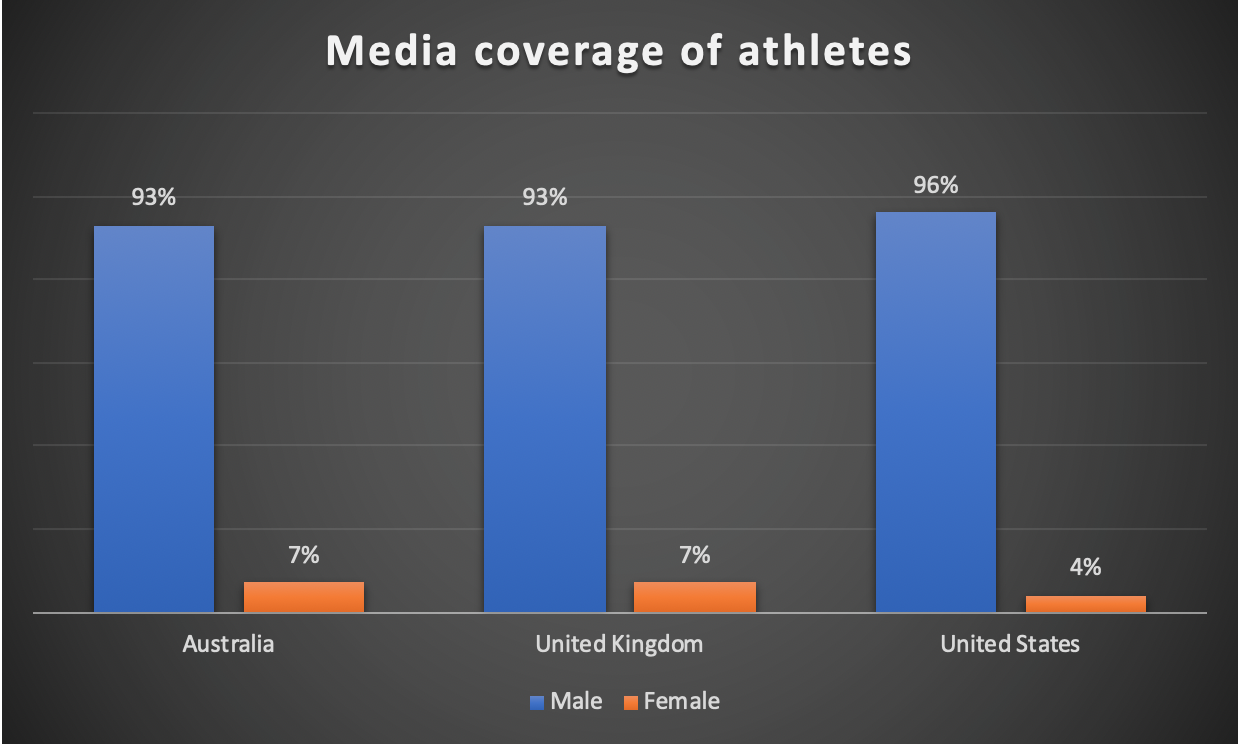
Media coverage of male and female athletes in Australia, United Kingdom, and the United States. Source based on research conducted by experts.

Media coverage takes forms such as News reports, television (TV) programs, and social media articles. Media coverage does not only enhance the popularity of athletes but also reveals the commercial nature of sports. Male's sports have higher production values and are going to seem more exciting. Novak Djokovic, the world's number one in men's single tennis said that male players deserve to be paid more than female players because "statistics are showing that we have much more spectators on the men's tennis matches", which means male athletes have gained more interests and attention. The economic logic is, that the viewership determines the commercial value of a sport, as the media producers hope to attract more audiences to make profits. This factor may affect the media coverage of female athletes. Despite greatly increased participation of women in sports, over the years media coverage of female athletes has remained unchanged. It has been argued that visibility of women's sports in media is necessary for its advancement and is a determining factor in closing the gender pay gap. Broadcasting deals and television exposure play an important role in the ability for athletes to gain sponsors and endorsements. With increased TV marketing comes larger and more profitable sponsors; this gain of profit in an industry will eventually lead to an increase in wages of sportswomen. While coverage of female athletes are lacking in traditional and online media outlets, personal social media accounts offer sportswomen new means to gain exposure, promote themselves, develop a fan base and reconstruct traditional gender stereotypes in sport. A study examined 1,587 images on the Instagram accounts of four major American sports networks and found women in gender "appropriate" sports were more likely to be featured along with those appearing nonathletic and next to a male.

In Australia, female's sports make up 7% of all sports media coverage, the same as the United Kingdom. Similarly, in the United States, nearly 40% of athletes are female, but they own 4% of media coverage. In a 2015 study, Billings and Young compared coverage of women's sports on ESPN's Sports Center and Fox Sports 1's Fox Sports Live, in which both TV programs were found to cover women's sports less than 1% of the time. In the Nordic welfare states women obtain 10% of routine newspaper or TV sports coverage. A 2015 analysis of International sports news websites found the three websites covering the most female athletics dedicated 7% of coverage.

Except for the quantity, the quality of media coverage also matters. The media portrayal of female athletes tend to be less professional, and sometimes involve entertaining or sexualised contents instead of portraying their athletic abilities. A study found that this type of sexist language was used in women's sports coverage in regard to athletes and teams from 1989 to 2000. Whereas in 2014, language shifted and became "gender bland", framing women's sports performances and achievements in uninteresting ways in comparison to men. Televised sports media jobs are also dominated and controlled by a majority of men and 90% of sports editors and 95% of sports news anchors and co-anchors were found to be male in a 2017 analysis of televised coverage of women's sports. In a study published in the Journal of Developmental Psychology, after viewing sexualized athletes, both girls and young women criticized the status of women in society, suggesting that more performance imagery of female athletes should be included in media coverage. In addition to being featured less frequently than men in the media, female athletes are also subject to far more criticism. A qualitative analysis established that tweets in sports media tend to underscore female athletes' achievements and exaggerate their losses. Considering sports broadcasting, women are breaking into the industry into large numbers even though gender-based stereotypes serve as a roadblock to their career advancement. In an experimental design study, a number of U.S. executives concluded that women are not accepted as sports analysts by general sports audiences and that women should solely commentate on gender-appropriate (feminine) sports.

In the United States, viewership for the 2019 Women's World Cup Final in France was 22% higher than the viewership of the 2018 Men's World Cup Final in Russia. Roughly 14.3 million people in the United States watched the Women's final while only 11.4 million watched the 2018 men's final. The 2015 Women's World Cup Final peaked at 25.4 million viewers, even higher than the 2019 Final. The reason for the lack of viewership in the 2019 final compared to the 2015 final was due to scheduling conflicts on the day of the 2019 final. At the same time that the women's final was taking place, the Men's Copa América final and Men's CONCACAF Gold Cup final were happening all on the same day.

=== Economic return ===
In a study that analyzed over 460 occupations, athletes have the worst gender pay gap. The average female athlete makes $15,232 in comparison to male athletes who make $38,008 on average, a 149.5% increase.

Economic elements also affect the pay equity within sports. In 2018, the WNBA team attracted 7,716 fans per game, which is more than 10,000 fans below the audience attracted by NBA teams per game. Female teams attracted fewer fans compares to male teams, indicates female teams sold less ticket and hence generated less revenue. The highest-paid female MMA Fighter Ronda Rousey says she thinks how much female athletes get paid should relate to how much revenue they bring in. The different marketability of athletes affects the corresponding earnings of male and female athletes. The economic benefits will occur as long as female athletes generate outstanding revenue as their male counterparts do.

However, the pay gap between men and women players is extreme and far outstrips these differences in revenue. Again comparing the NBA and WNBA: in 2019, the average NBA player earned $8,321,937, while a WNBA player earned $75,181. Golf also presents a massive pay gap between men and women athletes, with a PGA player earning around $1,235,495 and an LPGA player earning $48,993 on average. The soccer pay gap between MLS and NWSL is over $300,000, with men earning around $410,730 and women earning an average of $35,000. The MLB and NPF difference in pay is over $4,000,000, with women averaging around $6,000 a year in 2019. The difference in pay between ATP and WTA turns out to be around $50,000 a year as well.

Furthermore, the women players' earnings as a proportion of WNBA profits has changed over time. In the 1954–55 season, players grossed a total of 45% of the WNBA operating income. This eventually grew even higher, almost to 60%, but recently the WNBA players have been earning only 21% of the league's revenue.

=== Others ===
There are other factors which also affect the earning of female athletes – for example, the lack of women holding governing positions in the sports organization. Since many institutions involved in the process of monitoring sports do not have a demographic of women on the boards. Historically the rules and regulations that apply to women's sports have been introduced by men whose ideas have resulted in the disparity between the sexes. These differences come from the limitations applied to female athletes that are not enforced on male athletes. In Europe sports foundations, there are 14% of all decision-making positions which are occupied by women. Motherhood also reduces the earning of female athletes as they miss many chances of attending tournaments due to their physical condition. After the labor, it still takes time to train and rebuild the body shape. Pregnancy brings a commercial difference, and this mainly reflects through endorsement deals. Professional beach volleyball player Kerri Walsh once said that she was told to hold off on starting a new family by sponsors. The professional snowboarder Kimmy Fasani also faced the fear of losing her endorsement deals when she found out she is pregnant.

Pregnancy and childbirth can significantly impact an athlete's body and training regimen, necessitating an extended period for recovery and adaptation. Most female athletes are unable to compete during the final months of their pregnancies. Alysia Montano, an American track and field athlete, Olympic and World Medalist, and seven-time USA Track & Field National Champion, competed in 2014 and 2017 while she was 8 and 5 months pregnant, respectively. During her pregnancies, she faced the challenge of paused sponsorship contracts, including loss of pay.

In April 2024, Alysia developed a Model Sponsorship Contract Provisions for Pregnancy and Parental Leave that all sporting organizations should adopt. This initiative aims to enhance existing maternity support systems, providing athletes with more time to recover and greater opportunities to requalify for funding. Despite her successful efforts to support other female athletes, the U.S. remains one of only six countries worldwide without a national paid parental leave program. Many female athletes report feeling pressured to choose between their careers and starting a family, the U.S. remains one of only six countries in the world without a national paid parental leave program and many female athletes report feeling pressure to choose between their careers and starting a family.

US women's basketball has been subjected to this unequal policing from sports institutions by constricting the participation of female athletes in the sport due to historical beliefs of the differences in what women and men are capable of. An example is the fine-tuning of how women are to play basketball in 1898 where protestant sports people brought the format of a game of women's basketball. This update to the game enforced the idea of women being unable to compete at the same level as men which is why this change in rules was needed. This history, certain institutions, and cultural beliefs play a part in the current issue of lack of equity for women's sports. Advancements are being made to reduce the impact of motherhood on wages of female athletes. In 2020, a new collective bargaining agreement of the WNBA included an improved maternity leave policy allowing players to receive a full salary during their parental leave. It's a complicated matter having women navigate their sports careers and motherhood, this is compounded by the vacancy of resources except for the early statement of improvement. Female athletes have had to overcome the obstacle of sexist history that believes sports remove women's femininity meaning it is unnatural for them to pursue sports. Along with the myth of "sexual disorders" in sports, which is used to prevent the improvement of support systems for women in all stages of life in sports since the beliefs deem sports as male-dominated for a reason. Excluding women from proper equity and equality in this field.

The WNBA and NBA is one of the most prominent examples of the pay gap. In 2018, Aja Wilson was drafted the number one pick and earned a salary of $52,564. Deandre Ayton, was drafted the number one pick in the NBA and earned a salary of $5,091,500.

The average max salary cap for a player in the WNBA is roughly about $117,500. For an NBA player it's about 300 times more than that. For example, Steph Curry sits at $40.2 million.

Though the pay gap seen between the top ranking players in professional sports reveals to be alarming, wage discrepancies between lower ranked players proves to be equally as concerning. In 2015, the twenty-fifth ranked soccer player from the US Women's National Soccer team (USWNT) was compensated $341,721, while the 25th-ranked player from the US Men's National Soccer team (USMNT) received $580,522. A similar trend can be seen in looking at the fiftieth ranked soccer players, where the female player received $25,516 while the male player received $246,238.

The USWNT advocates for equal pay for the players. After these women won the World Cup in 2015, and broke records, many players decided together to battle against The United States Soccer Federation. In 2014, the men's winner of the World Cup received $35 million and the following year the USWNT won the World Cup and only received 2 million dollars. Moreover in 2014, the United States Men's National Soccer Team USMNT placed 11th and received nearly $10 million.

WNBA's low ticket sales and low salary may be due to marketing, as more resources are devoted to the NBA than the WNBA. Top NBA players are encouraged to appeal to female viewers.

In 2019, the WNBA signed a deal with CBS to broadcast 40 games a year. ESPN will also broadcast an additional 16 games on their network. NBATV will also broadcast more games as well.

== Impacts ==
Gender pay gap in sports links to the broader world and causes wider imbalance. In the financial point of view, this issue may cause the loss of financial revenue, as the pay gap in sports may lead to the less incentive of the female athletes to push themselves and to actively participate in sports because they feel unsupported. Except for professional athletes, other female participation in sports may also be affected. Ruth Holdaway, the chief executive officer at advocacy group Women in Sport, says if the public aims to close the pay gap in the long term, the public should be working with young girls to let them understand that sports are worth participating. Closing the pay gap in sports helps to create an environment where all female participation can enjoy equal rights as males. Furthermore, there is strong evidence of positive externalities from women's empowerment that leads to the successful results in women's football. In countries where women's empowerment is supported, we see more promotion of women's sports which tends to help decrease the gap in gender inequalities.

== Public response ==
=== Female athletes' actions ===
Some professional female athletes have taken steps forward to oppose the pay gap. The women's US soccer team has been especially vocal on this topic. The women's team's past includes placing in the top three for the World Cup for three decades yet the players do not believe that their pay reflects their success. In 2019 a player on the US men's soccer team would be paid $1.1 million if they won the World Cup. In the same year, a player on the US women's team would be paid $261,000 for a 1st place victory. When a team qualifies for the World Cup, there are built in bonuses when the team places in the top three. If the men's team were to place first, each player would receive a bonus of around half a million dollars. Comparing this to the women teams, a first place win would guarantee each player a bonus of under $100,000. After years began to go by with no changes made to equalize pay, the entire USWNT filed a gender discrimination lawsuit against US soccer. The specific accusations included unequal pay, medical treatment, transportation, and poor working conditions. Additionally, the USWNT aimed to establish a violation of the EPA through proving that different wages were paid for equal work; proving this does not require showing that the employees' work is identical, rather just that the work requires substantially equal skill, effort, and responsibility. "Skill" is measured in terms of performance requirements such as experience, education, training, and ability. "Effort" is measured in terms of the amount of mental and physical exertion needed to perform, as well as looking at the total requirements of the job. "Responsibility" is concerned with the job obligations and the degree of accountability required in the athlete's performance. Though skill levels may vary among women and men athletes across sports and effort may be exerted in different ways among players, it is highly likely to be found that male and female athletes exhibit equal amounts of skill, effort, and responsibility required of employees. Their efforts ultimately made minimal advances, but the team still remains and continues to be an active part in the gender equality movement. With the public support that the USWNT has gained from their lawsuit for equal pay, new courses of action are being discussed to provide these women athletes with an available remedy. Above all, these efforts will be highly influential in the way other professional female athletes negotiate their salaries and Collective bargaining agreements (CBAs) to further advance pay equality going forward. Although the USWNT is a leader in this movement, one of the most noteworthy cases happens in tennis. In 2006, American tennis player Venus Williams wrote an open letter to the London Times after she won the championship of Wimbledon but received lower prize money compared with her male counterpart. In that letter, Williams questioned that the disparity in prize money disregards female's hard work and Wimbledon conveys a faulty value. Tony Blair, the Prime Minister of the United Kingdom at that time, started to focus on the issue of the pay disparity in sports. In the followed year, Wimbledon adjusted the prize money structure and offered an equal amount of prize money to male and female athletes. Williams' letter drew the attention of the public and was later featured in a special series for ESPN, celebrating the 40th anniversary of the passing of the Title IX amendment, ensuring gender equality in any college program or activity receiving federal financial assistance.

=== Introducing regulations and eligibility ===
Introducing official regulations also plays an essential role in closing the pay gap in sports. The Male Champions of Change (MCC) is an Australian institute which redefines men's role in "taking action on gender inequality and encourage men of power and influence to contribute to gender equality issues in the communities". In 2019, MCC released the report of Pathway to Pay Equality, which aims to create new systems and cultures which can breed pay equity across all elite sports. The report details the specific actions and supports need to be taken to close the gender pay gap in sports. Pathway to Pay Equality assembles 17 Australian sporting chief executives as the signatories, to ensure female athletes have the same rights and opportunities in sports by evaluating and reporting their performance annually. The report introduced by MCC is considered to be the first time that the sports organizations have united globally to address the issue of unequal pay in sports, this can be a role model for other countries and institutes to emulate.

The eligibility requirements of the NBA versus the WNBA differ in such a way to allow male athletes to start their professional careers earlier. The NBA requires incoming athletes to be only one year removed from high school, whereas the WNBA requires incoming athletes to be 4 years removed from high school. Although the NBA oversees and runs both the NBA and WNBA, the eligibility requirements are in favor of male sports and therefore allow male athletes to begin their careers sooner than females.

This phenomenon has profound implications for an athlete's education. Considering NCAA athletics, female athletes are statistically among the highest achievers in all of postsecondary education while male athletes are doing just fine. But at the highest levels of football and men's basketball, much of the public believes that these athletes are on their way to the NFL or NBA. So, their academic advisers discover the simplest ways, at any cost, to keep them winning on the field.

== Statistics ==
Some popular and widespread sports still retain a significant pay gap. The following statistics show the income disparities between female athletes and their male counterparts.

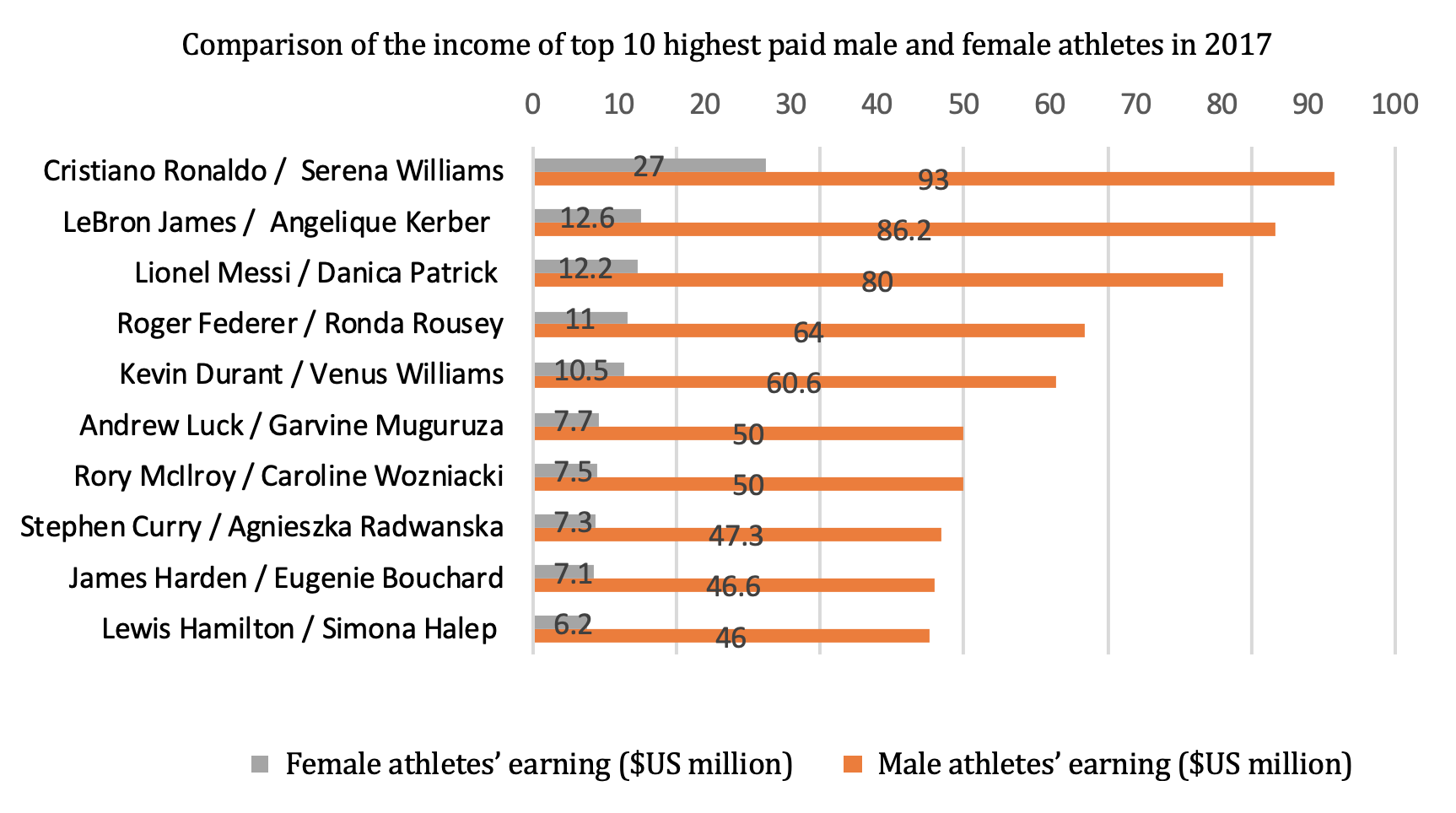
The income of the top 10 highest-paid female and male athletes based on the statistics released by Forbes in 2017

=== Soccer ===
In soccer, the United States women's national football team is paid almost four times less than the men's team. The women's team won the 2014 World Cup tournament but was paid $7 million prize money less than their male counterparts who failed in the round of 16. In 2016, the two-time Olympic gold medalist, American soccer player Hope Amelia Solo files lawsuit against the U.S Soccer Federation for disregarding pay equity with her teammates. And it was not until Megan Rapinoe became the deciding factor, and making an agreement with the Equal Employment Opportunity Commission in February 2022.

=== Basketball ===
The gender pay gap continues to affect all female professional athletes in almost all sports. Considering basketball, the maximum salary for a Women's National Basketball Association (WNBA) player is $111,500 whereas for the National Basketball Association (NBA), the minimum salary is $525,093. Further, the average salary in the NBA is $4,500,000 and the average salary in the WNBA is $72,000.

The pay gap in basketball also exists. In 2014, 5 teams of the WNBA out of overall 12 made a profit. The WNBA player who received the highest income is nearly one-fifth of the income of the lowest-paid NBA player. In 2018, the WNBA paid its players much less of their revenue, less than 25%, than the NBA does, about 50%. If the WNBA revenues were shared with its players as the NBA revenues are, their average salary would rise from $77,878 to around $191,083 in the 2018 season. In 2020 a new WNBA collective bargaining agreement was put in place and will go until 2027. Players in the WNBA will on average earn a salary of $130,000, with minimum and maximum salaries of $68,000 and $215,000 respectively; with the possibility for top athletes to earn over $500,000 annually. The players in the WNBA are unable to get their revenues from jersey sales, unlike the men's league, where the sale goes directly to the player. The WNBA league will spend up to $250,000 a player and at least $1 million in promoting and marketing of players annually. Significant change in the revenue sharing could allow players in the WNBA to earn 50% of their revenues as of the 2021 season.

=== Golf ===
The gender pay gap in golf is far from over. According to Golf Support, the prize money disparity between male and female athletes is 83% in professional golf. If a male and female golf player both wins a tournament, the male player can earn 6 times more than the female player. The average salary for a golfer in the Professional Golfers' Association (PGA) is $973,000 versus $162,000 for a player in the Ladies' Professional Golfers' Association (LPGA), demonstrating that women in professional golf make 16.6% of what male golfers make annually.

=== Skiing ===
The income disparity in professional skiing is outstanding, too. The U.S Olympian ski racer Lindsey Vonn points out that to those female ski racers who are not at the top, many of them have to give up their practice time to do part-time jobs to increase their income due to the insufficient prize money they receive. For Vonn, although she has won Olympic medals and World Cup titles, a large part of her income comes from endorsements instead of prize money.

Despite the disparity, statistics also show the equity of income in sports. Global research conducted by BBC Sport found that in the total of 44 sports that have been surveyed, 35 sports reward the same prize money to male and female athletes which shows an improvement compares to previous years. The following examples are sports which offer equal prize money.

=== Baseball/Softball ===
The pay gap between baseball and softball is very far off from each other. The average salary for an MLB player is $4.47 million a year. The average pay for a professional softball player is 6,000 a year. However, the pay gap showed signs of improvement as Monica Abbot signed a record $1 million contract over six years. This is still only $200,000 a year.

After a 12-year hiatus, baseball and softball returned to the Olympics. The World Baseball Softball Confederation (WBSC), the governing body for both sports, led the effort to secure the reinstatement. The WBSC provides a unique model in that one federation manages two very different sports. The work of the WBSC has become complicated by the prevailing cultural beliefs that deem baseball as male and softball as female. The global governance of baseball and softball under the WBSC might risk upholding long-standing gender stereotypes.

=== Tennis ===
The US Open logo

Tennis has been considered as the leader of pay equity in sports. In 1973, the American tennis player Billie Jean King moved into areas of pay equity in tennis. Her efforts led to the change of the prize money of the United States Open. In tennis, Venus Williams advocated for equal prize money to be awarded to female athletes in the most high-stakes tournaments. After 9 years of addressing the pay gap in prize money, Wimbledon finally gave both singles winners the same amount. Starting with the United States Open, up to now, all of the four Grand Slam tournaments offer the same prize money to female and male athletes. The list of the top 10 highest-paid female athletes in 2018 released by Forbes shows that tennis is the best-paying sports for female athletes as eight tennis player joined that list. In 2019, Serena Williams is the highest of all women's tennis players on the Forbes World's Highest-Paid Athletes list. She currently is sitting at number sixty-three. Williams is the highest of all female athletes on the list.

=== Volleyball ===
Volleyball is also one of the pioneers of promoting pay equity in sports. The International Volleyball Federation (FIVB) rewards the same prize money to both female and male athletes since 2004. Specifically, in 2015, the winning male team and female team were all rewarded the equal prize money of $60,000.

=== Surfing ===
The World Surf League (WSL) has altered the prize money structure and announced that female and males athletes would be paid the same amount of prize money from 2019 season in all the range of events that WSL controlled. This announcement also says that equal prize money campaign will also be managed to introduce to the second-tier surfing matches.

Professional surfing remains currently organized globally by the World Surf League (WSL), the governing body that took over from the Association of Surfing Professionals (ASP) in 2014. The WSL, in addition to the ASP, has faced criticism for its focus on the male surfer. At the highest level of the sport, there are 18 spots for women versus 36 for men, a gender imbalance that can be observed in major qualifiers worldwide. Similar to other professional sports, debate has arisen around distributing equal prize money. In 2016, initiatives to address the gender pay gap in surfing, and the women's purse and earnings increased significantly. Under this new rule, the men's purse is US$551,000 (split between 36 surfers), and the women's purse is US$275,500 (divided among 18 surfers).

=== Padel ===
World Padel Tour, the world's leading professional padel competition announced equal prize money for male and female players on March 8, 2022.

=== Boxing ===
Despite organizations like USA Boxing donating over $100,000 for marketing and promotion to raise awareness and improve the reputation of amateur boxing at all levels and over $420,000 to build women's boxing programs nationally. The sport remains predominantly male-dominated. According to Claressa Shields' promoter, Dmitriy Salita, TV and streaming deals are 10 to 20 times more lucrative for male boxers than for their female counterparts. While male boxers can earn around $3 million per fight, top female fighters have only recently begun to earn seven figures per match, with many still making significantly less. Women in boxing have demonstrated their ability to sell out large arenas, as exemplified by Katie Taylor and Amanda Serrano. On October 15, 2022, Shields fought in London, winning by unanimous decision after a full 10 rounds on Britain's first all-female card, defeating Savannah Marshall in a sold-out arena. She continues to advocate for the fight of women's boxing, including equal pay, fight time, and television coverage.

=== Mixed martial arts ===
Reported entry-level contracts in the Ultimate Fighting Championship (UFC), major MMA promotion, have been comparable across genders, with base rates of $8,000 for Jake Lindsey in 2014 and $10,000 for Jocelyn Jones-Lybarger in 2015, who was signed under specific short-notice circumstances. UFC CEO Dana White asserts that the organization pays women on the same scale as men, a claim supported by disclosed payouts from events such as UFC 232 event. At that event, Cris Cyborg earned $500,000 in disclosed pay, matching the purses of the night's top male headliners, Jon Jones and Alexander Gustafsson.

=== Sports industry ===
On top of athletes, the gender pay gap is also present in sports industry positions. A PayScale Survey has found that female sport marketing managers and sport event coordinators earn 82 cents and 92 cents respectively, for every dollar a male earns. Disparities in the wages of female and male Head coaches exist, a study on head coaches in Division One programs finds the gender wage gap to be larger in this sports industry. A study done at the University of Northern Colorado involved a sample of 72 head coaches in Division One Basketball across the United States and found that male coaches earned an average of $2,716,191, whereas female coaches earned much less with an average salary of $689,879.

Although, all women may face forms of inequality in sports workplaces, the intersection of gender and race leads to more severe barriers in place for black women in this industry. The lack of women of color in the athletic administrative and coaching positions in sports is greater as they not only face the challenges brought on by gender discrimination but also that of racial discrimination.

Despite the growth of women participating in sports, especially after the passing of Title IX, black women have not been able to benefit as much as white women. While female athletes still face more discrimination in comparison to male athletes, larger inequities due to being black and a woman have been left out of the Title IX discussion, exemplifying a dual invisibility for black female athletes. This remains an issue at both predominantly white institutions and historically black colleges and universities (HBCUs).
