= Peter Mel =

American surfer (born 1969)

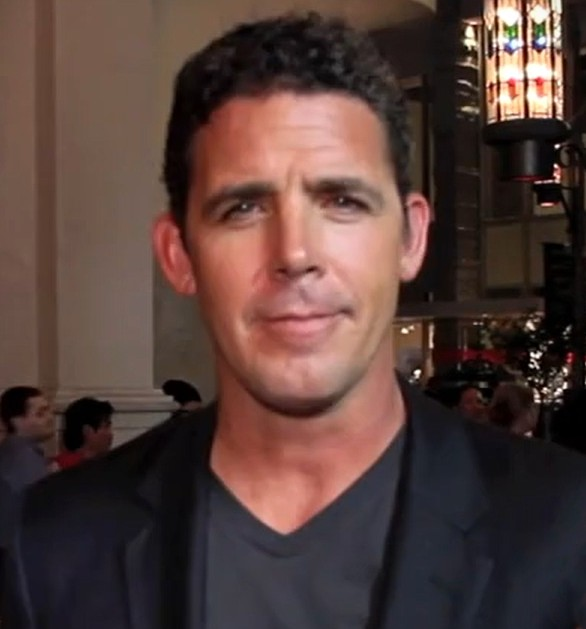
- Mel in 2012
- Born: November 24, 1969 (age 56); Santa Cruz, California, U.S.
- Spouse: Tara Mel
- Children: 2
- Surfing career
- Years active: 1975–present
- Height: 6 ft 3 in (1.91 m)
- Weight: 200 lb (91 kg)
- Website: www.petermel.com
- Sport: Surfing
- Sponsors: Darcsport; Freeline
- Major achievements: -(1997)1st place O’Neill Cold Water Classic, (Santa Cruz, California) -(2011)1st place Billabong Pico Alto Copa Burn -1st place, Crowned Big Wave World Tour Champion 2011/2012 -1st place Body Glove Mavericks Invitational 2012/2013 (Half Moon Bay, California)

Surfing specifications
- Stance: Regular (natural) foot
- Shapers: Self (Peter Mel) Al Merrick (Channel Islands Surfboards), John Carper (JC Surfboards), Stretch Surfboards and Freeline Surfboards (John Mel)
- Quiver: 5'10", 6'1", 6'4", 6'6" & 10"2

Peter Mel (born November 24, 1969, in Santa Cruz, California), is an American professional surfer. Mel began his surfing life in Capitola, California before moving on to Santa Cruz. He is known as a 'big wave' surfer and son of John Mel, a four time surfing National Champion.

== Career ==
Throughout the 1990s, Mel participated on the World Surf League domestic and Qualifying Series, before finally finding his niche of big-wave surfing during California's El Nino winter of 1997–1998. The Big Wave World Tour concluded its third successful season crowning Mel as Big Wave World Tour Champion winning the Billabong Pico Alto Invitational.

Mel appeared in the movies Step into Liquid, Riding Giants, Chasing Mavericks and Peaking, Peter Mel. Mel has appeared opposite Gerard Butler in Chasing Mavericks. Mel is a broadcaster for the World Surf League. He finished eighth in the 1998 Surfer Magazine Reader’s Poll Awards.

In 2018, Mel participated in an interview with a surfing periodical with journalist Shelby Stanger to discuss personal issues he fought with and overcame. In the interview Mel discusses how he prepares for big wave riding, family, and personal demons. Mel also appeared with Laird Hamilton to discuss balancing life as an athlete and family.

=== Contest wins ===
Year	Place	Contest
1997	1st	O'Neill Cold Water Classic, Santa Cruz, California
2011	1st	Billabong Pico Alto Copa Burn
2012	1st	Big Wave World Tour
2013	1st	Body Glove Mavericks Invitational

== Retirement ==
Following the end of the 2013 season, Mel entered retirement from the pro surfing circuit, and, subsequently, becoming the World Surf League's (WSL) first Big Wave World Tour (BWWT) commissioner for the WSL's inaugural 2014–2015 season. Mel retired as commissioner of the WSL BWWT in 2014 to run his surf shop and compete again on the Big Wave Tour.
