= Riding Giants =

2004 film by Stacy Peralta

- Directed by: Stacy Peralta
- Written by: Stacy Peralta; Sam George
- Produced by: Agi Orsi, Jane Kachmer (producer); Franck Marty, Nathalie Delest, Laird Hamilton (executive producer)
- Starring: Greg Noll; Jeff Clark; Peter Mel; Laird Hamilton; Gerry Lopez; Mickey Munoz; Darrick Doerner
- Narrated by: Stacy Peralta
- Cinematography: Peter Pilafian; Sonny Miller
- Edited by: Paul Crowder
- Music by: Matter
- Production company: StudioCanal
- Distributed by: Sony Pictures Classics
- Release dates: January 2004 (Sundance); July 9, 2004 (United States)
- Running time: 101 minutes
- Countries: United States; France
- Language: English

Riding Giants is a 2004 documentary film produced by Agi Orsi and directed and narrated by skater and surfer Stacy Peralta. The movie traces the origins of surfing and specifically focuses on the art of big wave riding. Some of the featured surfers are Greg Noll, Laird Hamilton, and Jeff Clark, and surfing pioneers such as Mickey Munoz. The film premiered at the 2004 Sundance Film Festival.

== Synopsis ==
The film begins with a historical overview, starting at its Hawaiian beginnings, then moves on to focus on the dangerous lure of big-wave surfing (surfing waves that can reach up to 70 feet (21 meters)). The documentary chronicles the evolution of riding at Hawaii's Waimea Bay in the 1950s, the revolution of lighter boards, and tow-in surfing to allow for "riding giants". Three surfers who are part of this multi-generational evolution are spotlighted: Greg Noll is shown as a fearless big wave rider during the 1950s and 1960s; Jeff Clark who discovered Mavericks in Northern California and surfed there alone for years; and Laird Hamilton, the contemporary surfer who brings tow-in riding to the limelight.

== Production ==
Peralta previously directed the acclaimed documentary Dogtown and Z-Boys, which documented the rise of skateboarding, of which he was an integral part. The French producer Franck Marty, along with his partners, chose him to direct a new breed of big wave riding documentary film. He has said that the primary purpose of making a surfing documentary was that he "wanted to see a film like this", and that he hoped it helped to answer the question "why people choose to devote their entire lives to the pursuit of riding waves."

Riding Giants utilizes stills, archive footage, "re-enacted" footage, home movies, and interviews. Some of the surfers interviewed include Jeff Clark, Laird Hamilton, Dave Kalama, Gerry Lopez, Greg Noll, Kelly Slater and Peter Mel.

== Soundtrack music ==
Includes: Basement Jaxx, David Bowie, Link Wray, Dick Dale, Doves, Fila Brazillia, Bill Haley & His Comets, The Hives, Linkin Park, John Mayall, Moby, Pearl Jam, The Ruts, Screamin' Jay Hawkins, Soundgarden, The Stray Cats, Alice in Chains, Érik Satie and The Waterboys.

== Reception ==
Riding Giants was the first documentary film to open the Sundance Film Festival. It won the 2004 A.C.E. Eddie Award for Best Edited Documentary by editor Paul Crowder. According to Rotten Tomatoes, the film has a 92% fresh rating, having earned mostly positive reviews from critics, with the website's critics consensus calling it "a great addition to the existing surfing documentaries." Roger Ebert said in his review, "Before seeing Riding Giants, my ideas about surfing were formed by the Gidget movies, Endless Summer, The Beach Boys, Elvis and lots of TV commercials. Riding Giants is about altogether another reality."

== See also ==
- Step into Liquid
