= Titans of Mavericks =

Big wave surfing competition

Titans of Mavericks poster

Titans of Mavericks was a big wave surfing competition held at the Mavericks surf break in California. The event took place annually from 1999 until 2016, when the organizing company filed for bankruptcy, leading to the cancellation of the 2017 competition. The World Surf League subsequently took over the event but indefinitely canceled it in 2019, citing "various logistical challenges" and the inability to hold the competition during the previous two seasons.

== History ==
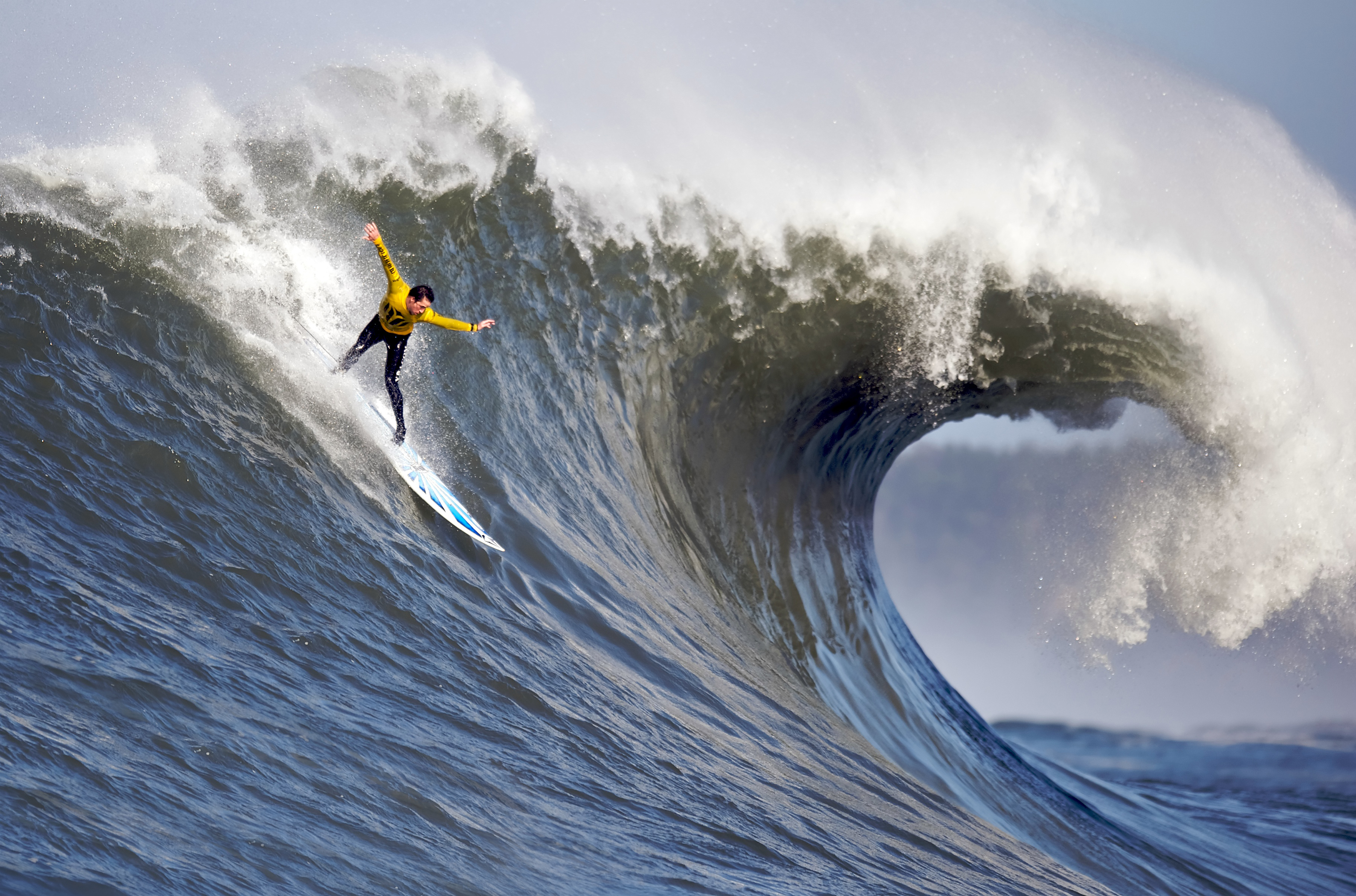
2010 Mavericks surfing competition.

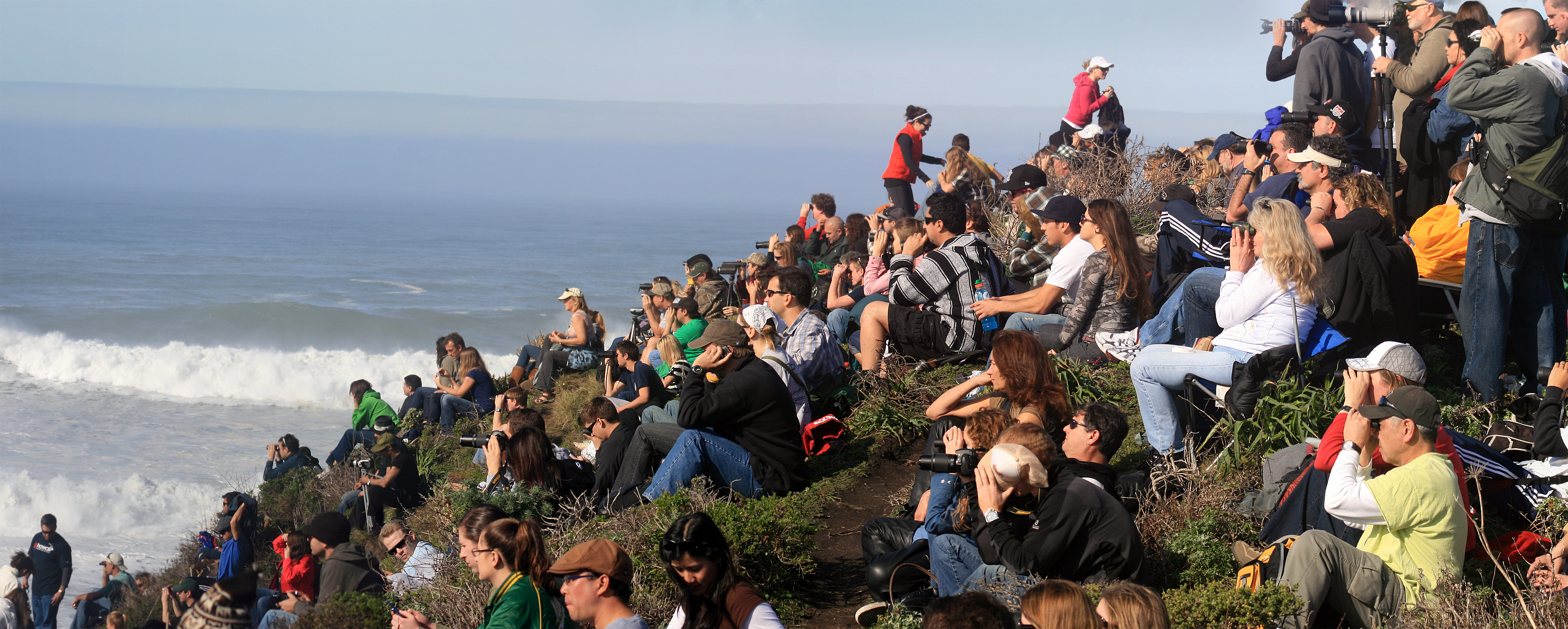
Spectators of Mavericks contest in 2010.

The first surfing contest at Mavericks, later known as the Titans of Mavericks, was held in 1999 and occurred ten times, with the final contest taking place in 2016. Each year, 24 big wave surfers were invited to compete in the one-day event, which was only held if wave conditions were favorable during the competition season. The event featured waves that could reach heights of up to 60 feet (18 m).

Darryl Virostko ("Flea") won the inaugural contest in 1999, with Richard Schmidt, Ross Clarke-Jones, and Peter Mel taking second, third, and fourth places, respectively. In the following year, Virostko secured first place again, followed by Kelly Slater, Tony Ray, Peter Mel, Zach Wormhoudt, and Matt Ambrose in second through sixth places. In 2004, Virostko placed first, with Ambrose, Evan Slater, Anthony Tashnick, Mel, and Grant Washburn rounding out the top six. Tashnick won first place in 2005. In 2006, South African surfer Grant Baker won first place, with Tyler Smith and Brock Little finishing second and third. The 2007 contest was canceled due to a lack of suitable waves by the end of March, which was the usual cutoff time for the competition. In 2008, Greg Long won the Mavericks Championship, with Baker in second place and Jamie Sterling in third, followed by Smith, Washburn, and Evan Slater. The contest was canceled again in 2009. In 2010, South African surfer Chris Bertish took first place, winning a prize purse of $150,000, sponsored by Moose Guen, Jane Sunderland, and Barracuda Networks.

In the fall of 2010, a group of surfers, community leaders, and contest organizers formed the Half Moon Bay Surf Group, Inc., with the intention of managing the contest. In October of that year, the San Mateo Harbor Commission granted them the permit to organize the event, leading to the planning of the inaugural "The Jay at Maverick's Big Wave Invitational" (as it was then called). Invited competitors included 11-time ASP World Champion Kelly Slater and 23 others. However, due to a lack of waves, the contest was not held in 2011 and 2012. The 2013 contest was won by Peter Mel, and the 2014 event was won by Grant Baker. The contest was later rebranded as "Titans of Mavericks" and was governed by a group of five Mavericks surfers known as the "Committee 5" . The final Mavericks Surf contest took place on February 12, 2016.

AT&T Park in San Francisco hosted live broadcasts of the event on its 110-foot-wide video display.

In October 2006, the Monterey Bay National Marine Sanctuary proposed banning personal watercraft from Mavericks, leading to disputes within the surfing community.

=== Mavericks contest results ===
The following is a list of past Mavericks invitational competitions and winners.

Season(s)	Date Held	Champion	2nd Place	3rd Place	4th Place	5th Place	6th Place
1998-1999	February 17, 1999	(California) Darryl Virostko	(California) Richard Schmidt	(Australia) Ross Clarke-Jones	(California) Peter Mel		
1999-2000	March 3, 2000	(California) Darryl Virostko	(Florida) Kelly Slater	(Australia) Tony Ray	(California) Peter Mel	(California) Zach Wormhoudt	(California) Matt Ambrose
2000-2003	No contest held						
2003-2004	February 7, 2004	(California) Darryl Virostko	(California) Matt Ambrose	(California) Evan Slater	(California) Anthony Tashnick	(California) Peter Mel	(California) Grant Washburn
2004-2005	March 2, 2005	(California) Anthony Tashnick	(California) Greg Long	(California) Tyler Smith	(California) Zach Wormhoudt	(California) Shane Desmond	(California) Matt Ambrose
2005-2006	February 8, 2006	(South Africa) Grant Baker	(California) Tyler Smith	(Hawaii) Brock Little	(California) Matt Ambrose	(California) Grant Washburn	(California) Evan Slater
2006-2007	No contest held						
2007-2008	January 12, 2008	(California) Greg Long	(South Africa) Grant Baker	(Hawaii) Jamie Sterling	(California) Tyler Smith	(California) Grant Washburn	(California) Evan Slater
2008-2009	No contest held						
2009-2010	February 13, 2010	(South Africa) Chris Bertish	(California) Shane Desmond	(California) Anthony Tashnick	(Hawaii) Dave Wessel	(Brazil) Carlos Brule	(California) Kenny Collins
2010-2012	No contest held						
2012-2013	January 20, 2013	(California) Peter Mel	(California) Zach Wormhoudt	(California) Greg Long	(Brazil) Alex Martins	(Hawaii) Mark Healey	(California) Shawn Dollar
2013-2014	January 24, 2014	(South Africa) Grant Baker	(Hawaii) Shane Dorian	(California) Ryan Augenstein	(California) Tyler Fox	(California) Greg Long	(California) Anthony Tashnick
2014-2015	No contest held						
2015-2016	February 12, 2016	(California) Nic Lamb	(California) Travis Payne	(California) Greg Long	(California) Tyler Fox	(Australia) Jaime Mitchell	(Brazil) Carlos Brule

=== Indefinite cancellation of the event ===
In 2019, following two consecutive years of canceled competitions, the World Surf League announced that the Titans of Mavericks contest had been indefinitely canceled, citing "various logistical challenges" and "the inability to run the event the last two seasons." The competition has not been held since.
