= Andrea Moller =

Brazilian-American canoeist and surfer

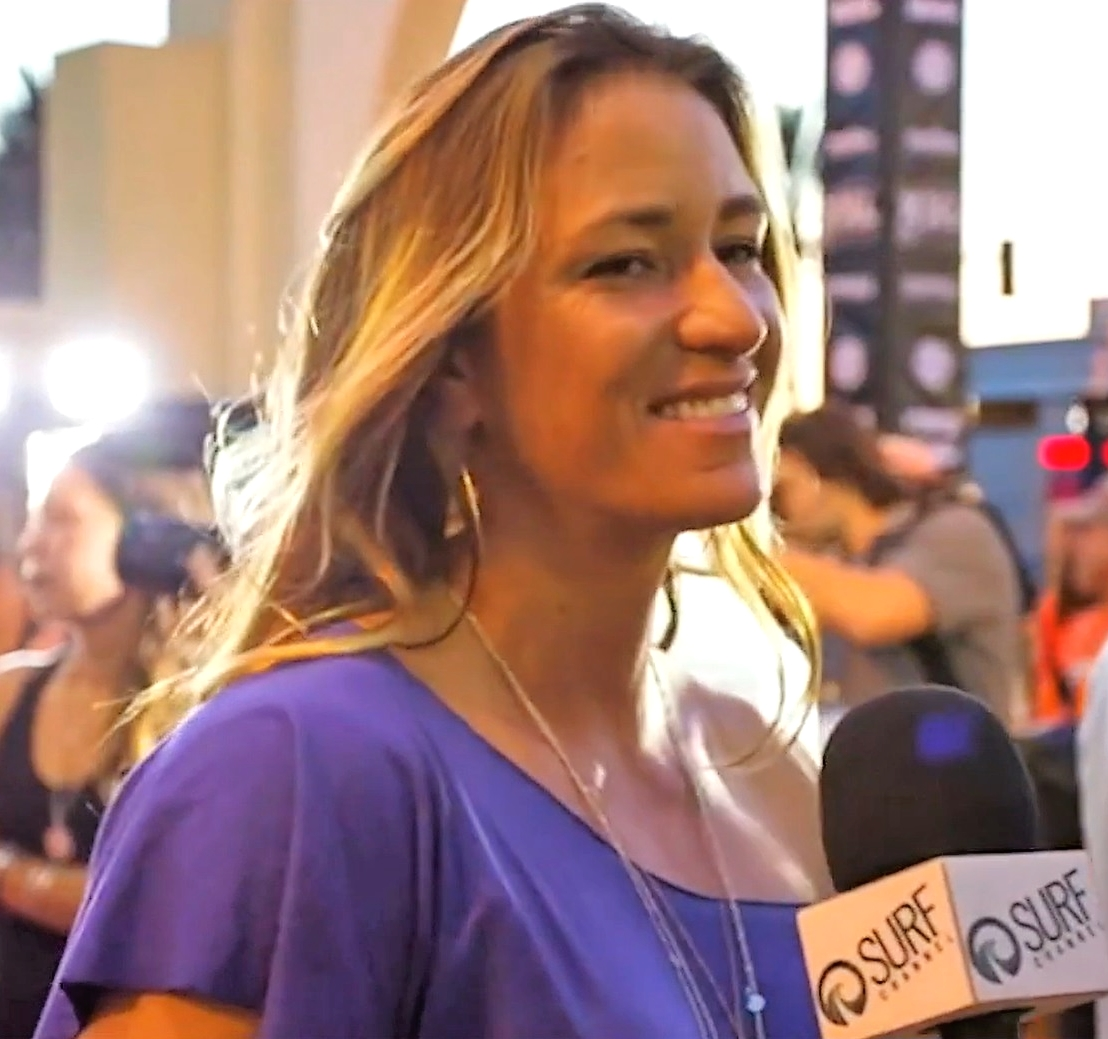
Moller interviewed in trailer for She is the Ocean, 2018 film

Andrea Moller is a Brazilian-American competitive canoeist and surfer. She competes in every outrigger race large event, from one-man (OC1) to six-man (OC6) canoes as well as SUP long-distance races all year round. She is a professional Paramedic and mother, on Maui where she lives.

Moller was elected the "most important" Brazilian water woman by Go Outside, a Brazilian sports magazine based in São Paulo, Brazil. It recognizes her performance during 2010 as a top female athlete.

== Life and career ==
Andrea Moller was born in Brazil and was raised on the small island of Ilhabela, São Paulo. Growing up in her family's marina, she was exposed to ocean sports from the time she could walk and always had her family's full support to be the best competitive athlete that she could be. While in Brazil, she was a top medalist in swimming, biking and windsurfing.

In 1998, she followed her dream and moved to Maui where she became a paramedic and professional water athlete. She dedicated her life to many water sports, focusing her biggest passion on surfing big waves, paddling outrigger canoes and SUP. She began paddling in 1999 to keep herself physically trained, took the sport seriously, and became internationally recognized as a proficient waterwoman.

=== Competitive sports ===
==== Outrigger canoe ====
As an OC paddler, she has won many titles, records and awards, including world recognized competitions of channel crossings like Maui to Molokai (Pailolo Channel), Molokai to Oahu (Ka’iwi channel) and the Tahitian Race Hawaiki Nui Va'a. For the past six years, Andrea has been a part of the world's best women's paddler team, Team Bradley, the seven-time winner (as of 2012) of Na Wahine O Ke Kai race, the challenging 42-mile channel crossing women's OC6 - six-man canoe race.

==== Stand-up paddling ====
Her SUP career started in 2005, when she crossed the grueling 32-mile Ka’iwi Channel competing amongst the men. In 2006 she was part of the first female Stand Up team, together with Maria Souza to cross the Ka'iwi channel in the Molokai to Oahu Paddleboard World Championships. Moller achieved a number of titles in long distance competitions in Hawaii such as The Battle of the Paddle and Olukai Ho’olaule'a.

==== Surfing ====
Andrea Moller surfs big waves, including waves of 40-foot plus at Pe'ahi, also known as "Jaws". She has been tow-in surfing Jaws since joining with Souza in 2004 to become the world's first female tow-in team. (Maui Magazine November–December-2006 Big Wave Wahine) The pair became world's first female tow-in-team. Andrea is the first woman to paddle in at Pe'ahi.

In 2016, Moller won for "Women's Best Performance" at the WSL Big Wave Awards.

In 2023, women competed in the surfing competition called “The Eddie” for the first time; Andrea was among them, and she was the first woman to ride a wave in that competition.

=== Ike Moana ===
Founder of “Ike Moana”, Andrea started the event in 2013 aiming to make it an annual event to give special needs kids the opportunity to spend a day with pro athletes and learn stand up paddling. It is the pre-race event for the Paddle Imua race, which is a fundraiser race for Camp Imua Family Services.

== Titles ==
During 2013:
Solo 1st Place - Paddle Imua race, 9.5 mi, SUP (5/4/2013) Solo 1st Place - Olukai Ho’olaule’a, 8 mi, SUP (5/11/2013) Solo 2nd Place - Olukai Ho’olaule’a, 8 mi, OC 1 (5/12/2013)

During 2012:
1st - Na Wahine O Ke Kai, 42 mi, Oc6 Team Bradley (09/23/2012) 2nd - M2O, Ka’iwi Channel, 32 mi SOLO SUP (07/29/2012) Triple Crown Overall Female Champion SUP: 1st – Triple Crown- 3rd leg: Pailolo Channel, Maui to Molokai 26 mi, SUP (07/14/2012) 1st – Triple Crown- 2nd leg: Ma'alaea to Kihei Boat ramp, 8 mi, SUP (07/08/2012) 1st – Triple Crown- first leg: Maliko to Kahului, 9.5 mi, SUP (07/01/2012) 1st - Naish International Paddle race, 9.5 mi, SUP (07/22/2012) 1st - Olukai Ho’olaule’a race, 8 mi, SUP (05/12/2012) 3rd - Olukai Ho’olaule’a race, 8 mi, OC 1 (05/13/2012) 1st - Paddle Imua race, 9.5 mi, SUP (05/05/2012) 1st - Quicksilver Waikiki Paddle Fest, long distance 10 mi, SUP (05/06/2012) 1st - Dukes Ocean Fest, 10 mi, SUP (08/25/2012) 1st - W2 Downwind - Brazil, 18 mi, SUP (10/13/2012) - During 2011:
- Solo: First place in the first leg of Maui Jim SUP Triple Crown - July 3/2011 - Solo: First place in the Olukai One-man (OC-1) Outrigger Canoe Race - May 15/2011
- Solo: First place in the Olukai SUP Race - 00:55:41 - May 14/2011
During 2010, she won 6 titles out of six races she entered. Five solo races and one team race:
- Solo: First place in the Battle of the Paddle Race, June 13/2011
- Solo: First place in the 5th Maui Annual Paddle Board Race - 1:22:11 - July 18/2010
- Solo: First place in the Molokai to Oahu Paddle Board Race - 6h even - July 25/2010
- Solo: First place in the Olukai One-man Outrigger Canoe Race - 00:53:25.6 - May 26/2010
- Solo: First place in the Olukai SUP Race - 00:57:50.6 - May 26/2010
- Team Bradley: First place in the Na Wahine O Ke Kai, International Molokai to Oahu Six-man Outrigger canoe Race - 5:54:13 - Sep 26th/2010

== Equipment ==
She uses Quickblade paddles, SIC Stand Up Board and Kai Waa OC-1.

== Sponsors ==
- 2010 received support from Maui Jim, Dakine and Maui Surf Girls,
- 2011 receiving support from Maui Jim, SIC and Planet Sun.
- 2012 receiving support from Maui Jim, QUICK BLADE, SIC and Planet Sun.
- 2013 receiving support from Maui Jim, QUICK BLADE, SIC and Planet Sun.

== Films ==
“ Wave Chasers “ Travel Channel documentary by Warren Miller Production- Featuring two teams of wave chasers: Garett Macnamara & Kealii Mamala Andrea Möller & Maria Souza.

“ Extreme Moms “ Documentary by Rebel Media - Featuring the first female team to tow surf massive waves like Peahi. Andrea Möller and Maria Souza: two mothers following the water woman dream.

“ Osso Duro “ National TV Show by Multishow– Brazil Featuring six elite Brazilian athletes making a reality type show, challenging the tidal bore wave Pororoca in Amazon, Manaus, Brazil.

“ A Vida La Fora “ National TV Show by Multishow– Brazil Featuring Andrea's lifestyle on Maui.
