= The Eddie =

Surfing tournament held on Oʻahu in Hawaii

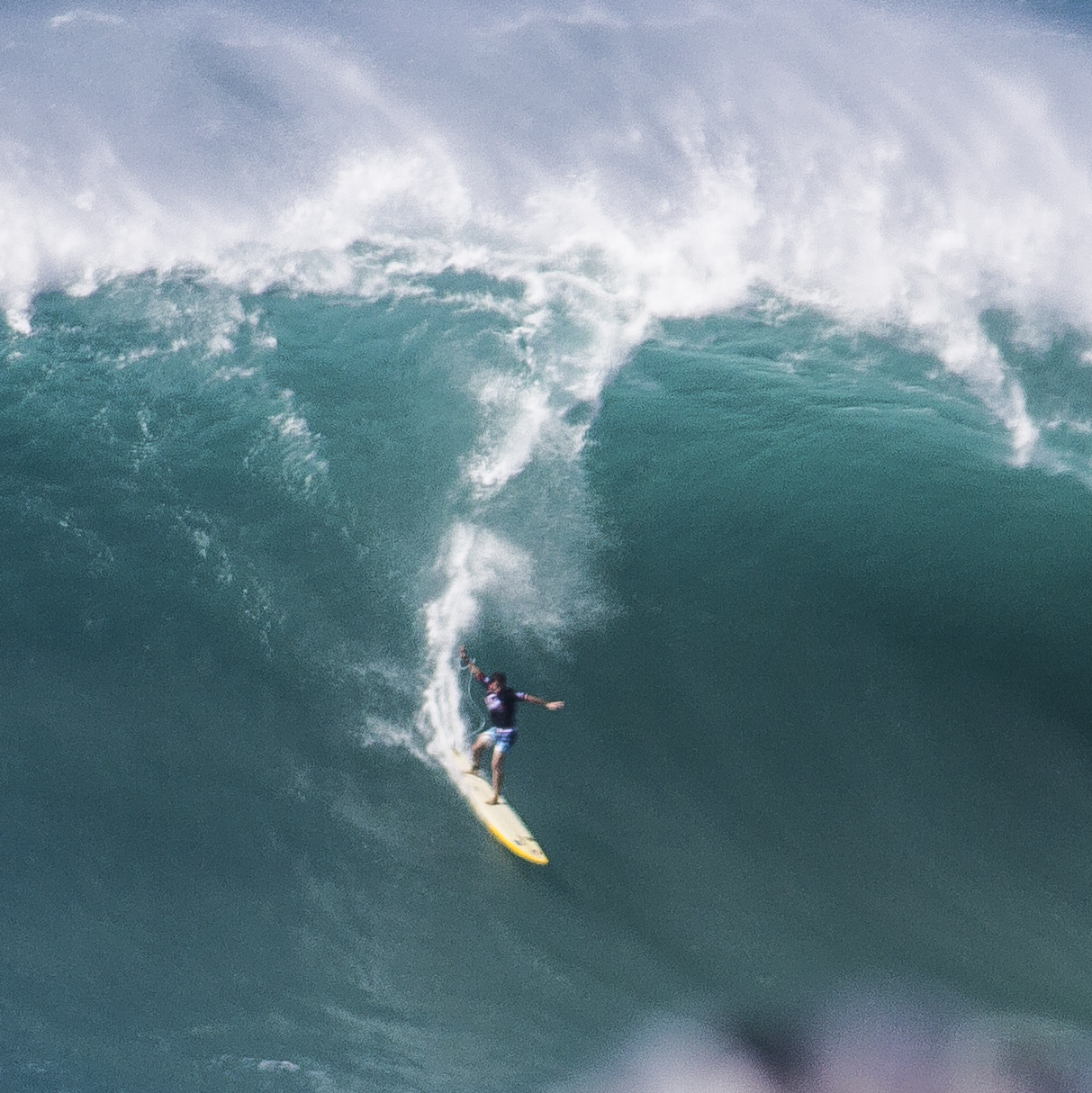
Surfer at The Eddie in February 2016

The Eddie Aikau Big Wave Invitational (colloquially, "The Eddie") is a big wave surfing tournament held at Waimea Bay on the north shore of Oahu, Hawaii. The tournament is named for native Hawaiian champion big wave surfer and life-saving Waimea Bay lifeguard Eddie Aikau. Created in 1984 at nearby Sunset Beach, the invitational tournament moved to the notoriously big-waved Waimea Bay, where Aikau's family maintains an ancestral tradition as caretakers of Waimea Valley.

Previously, The Eddie was formally the Quiksilver in Memory of Eddie Aikau until 2016, after which sponsor Quiksilver and the Aikau family could not agree to terms for a new contract; since 2024 it has been called the Rip Curl Eddie Aikau Big Wave Invitational after the surfing apparel company Rip Curl took over sponsorship of the event. The tournament draws crowds of up to 50,000 people and can be seen from Kamehameha Highway in Waimea Bay on O‘ahu.

== Tournament format and history ==
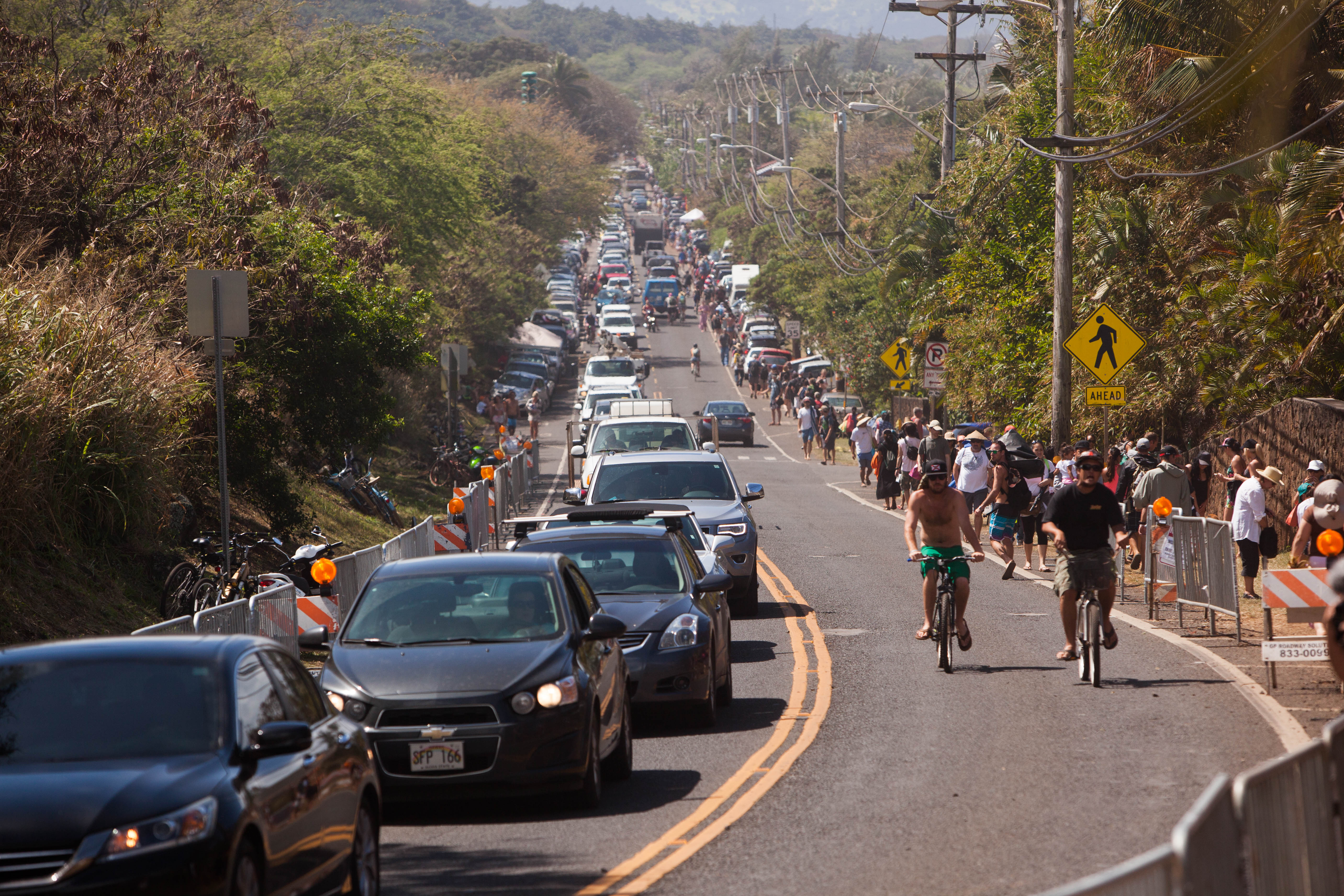
The Eddie spectators on Kam Hwy on the North Shore of Oahu on Feb 24, 2016

The first tournament took place in 1985 and was directed by George Downing and sponsored by Quiksilver.

The "Eddie would go" phrase related to the tournament was coined by big surf legend Mark Foo. In February 1986, Mark Foo lost first place at the competition when Eddie's brother Clyde Aikau beat him.

The tournament is known for a unique requirement that open-ocean swells reach a minimum height of 20 feet (6.1 m) before the competition can be held. Open-ocean swells of this height generally translate to wave faces in the bay of 30 feet (9.1 m) to 40 feet (12 m). As a result of this requirement, the tournament has only been held a few times during the history of the event, most recently in 2024.

Each year, 28 to 40 surfers, chosen by a polling of their peers, are invited to Waimea Bay to attend the opening ceremony ("Blessing of Eddie Aikau" held on the first Thursday of December). During the competition window, these surfers await an official call (which does not always occur), at which time they have 12 hours to arrive at Waimea Bay to check in the morning of the competition. Participants compete in two rounds of about four or five heats each during the competition day, which is generally from 8:00 a.m. to 5:00 p.m. Each heat in the first round lasts 45 minutes, and 50 minutes in the second round. Surfers' four best-scoring waves over both rounds make up their total score.

Eddie Aikau's brother, Clyde Aikau, won the second "Eddie" in 1986. Before Eddie's death, at the age of 31 in 1978, the two brothers had surfed together and competitively, for a number of years. They are the only native Hawaiians to win the Duke Kahanamoku Invitational Surfing Championship.

The Eddie Aikau Big Wave Service was held in 1995 but the contest was called off when the ocean swells dropped. The $50,000 purse was then distributed to participants, which included Garrett McNamara.

On January 28, 1998, Hawaii issued a "Condition Black" due to above-average behemoth surf, and restricted all access to all North Shore beaches, including Waimea Bay; so the Quiksilver Big Wave Invitational in Memory of Eddie Aikau was canceled that year.

The 2023 event included female surfers for the first time in the contest's history. (Note: A female surfer, Keala Kennelly, was invited to the 2018-2019 tournament which was cancelled when waves that met the tournament criteria failed to arrive.)

The 2024 event was announced on December 20, and the 11th competition took place on December 22.

The 2025-2026 competition was not held because suitable conditions did not occur during the competition window of December 7 to March 6. More than 100 volunteers and staff had been on call with a two-days notice to put on the event within the competition window.

== Tournament winners ==
Eddie Aikau Big Wave Invitational summary
Date	Edition	Winner	Age	Ref.
January 3, 1985	1	Denton Miyamura	24	
February 23, 1986	2	Clyde Aikau	36	
January 21, 1990	3	Keone Downing	33	
January 1, 1999	4	Noah Johnson	25	
January 12, 2001	5	Ross Clarke-Jones	34	
January 8, 2002	6	Kelly Slater	29	
December 15, 2004	7	Bruce Irons	25	
December 8, 2009	8	Greg Long	25	
February 25, 2016	9	John John Florence	23	
January 22, 2023	10	Luke Shepardson	27	
December 22, 2024	11	Landon McNamara	28	

== Gallery ==
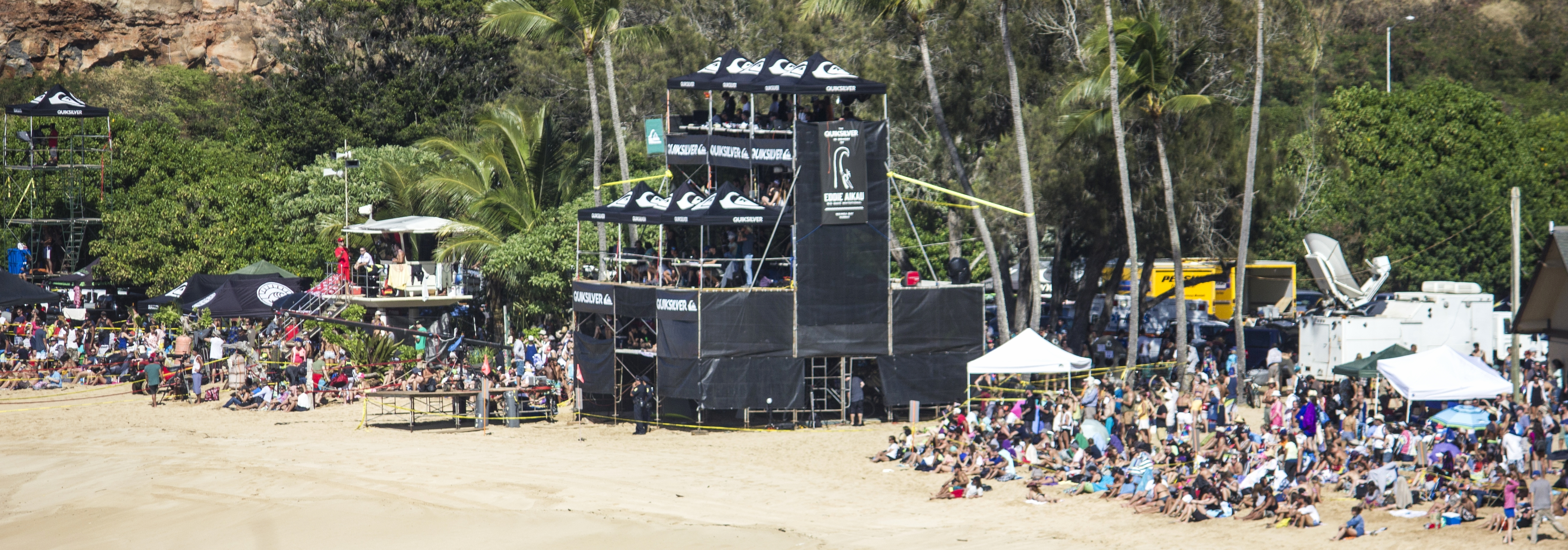
Large crowd of spectators on Waimea Beach during The Eddie on February 25, 2016
