= Sachi Cunningham =

American filmmaker and photographer

Sachi Cunningham is an American filmmaker, surf photographer, journalist and Professor Emerita of Multimedia Journalism at San Francisco State University.

== Career ==
Cunningham is the director and producer of Big Wave Women (formerly SheChange), an upcoming documentary about female surfers. She is also a journalism professor at San Francisco State University.

She was a producer and director of photography for PBS FRONTLINE/World. She was also a video journalist for the Los Angeles Times.

== Education ==
Cunningham is an alumnus of Brown University and the UC Berkeley Graduate School of Journalism.

== Personal life ==
Cunningham is a cancer survivor.
