= Keala Kennelly =

American surfer and actor

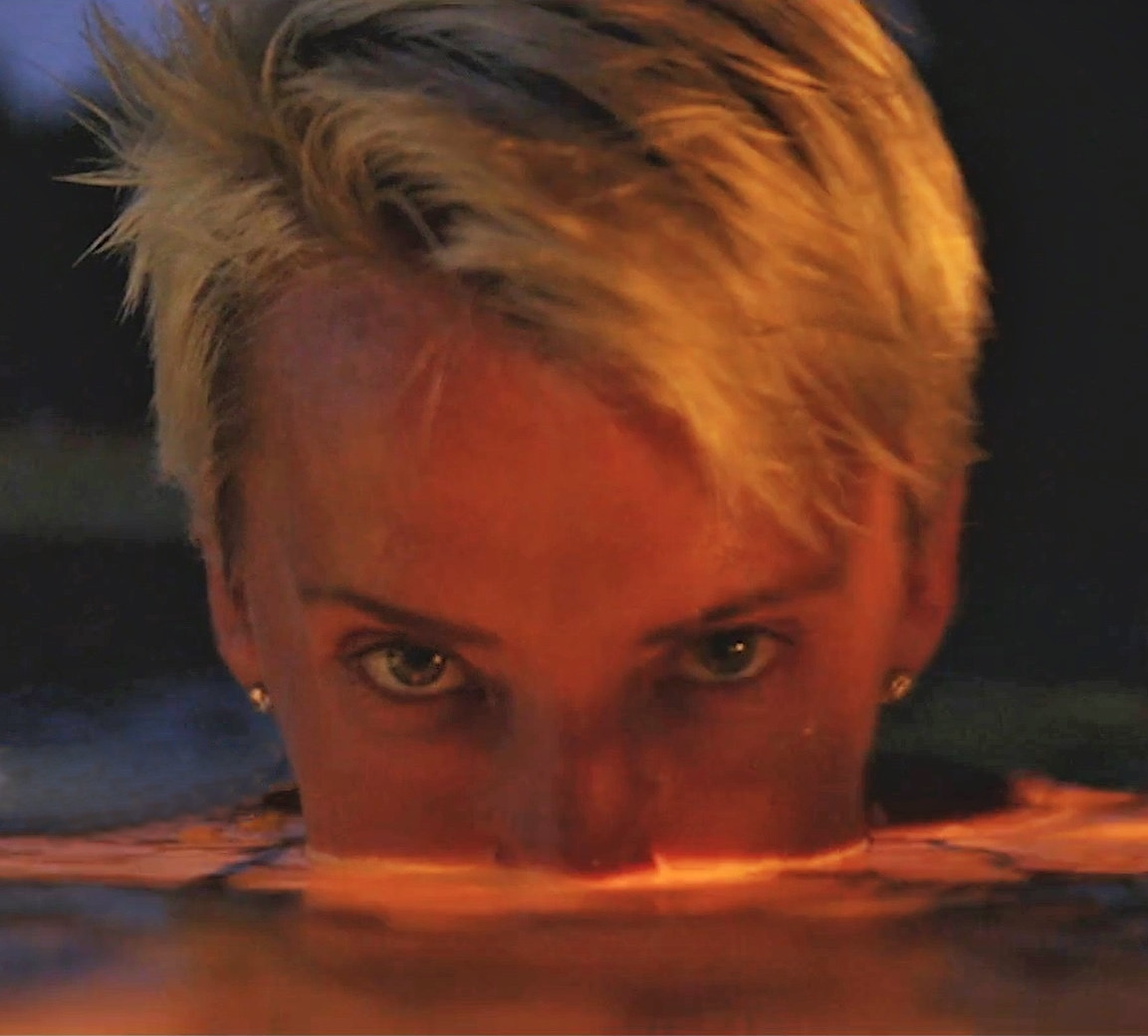
- Kennelly in trailer for She is the Ocean, 2018 film

Personal information
- Born: August 13, 1978 (age 47) Kauaʻi, Hawaii

Surfing career
- Sport: Surfing
- Major achievements: Two-time winner of Billabong Pro in Teahupoo; 2003 ASP Women's WCT Runner Up; 2003 Triple Crown Winner; Two-time winner of Billabong XXL Girls Performance Award; 2013 Inductee, Surfing Walk of Fame and Actions Sports Hall of Fame

Surfing specifications
- Favorite waves: Teahupoo, Tahiti

Keala Kennelly (born August 13, 1978) is a professional surfer, DJ, and actress from Kauaʻi, Hawaii. After spending a decade ranked in the top 10 on the ASP World Championship Tour (WCT), Kennelly took a break from the tour in 2007 to explore her passions for acting and music, including a recurring role as a surfer in the 2007 series John from Cincinnati. She continues to DJ and compete as a big wave surfer.

== Surfing career ==
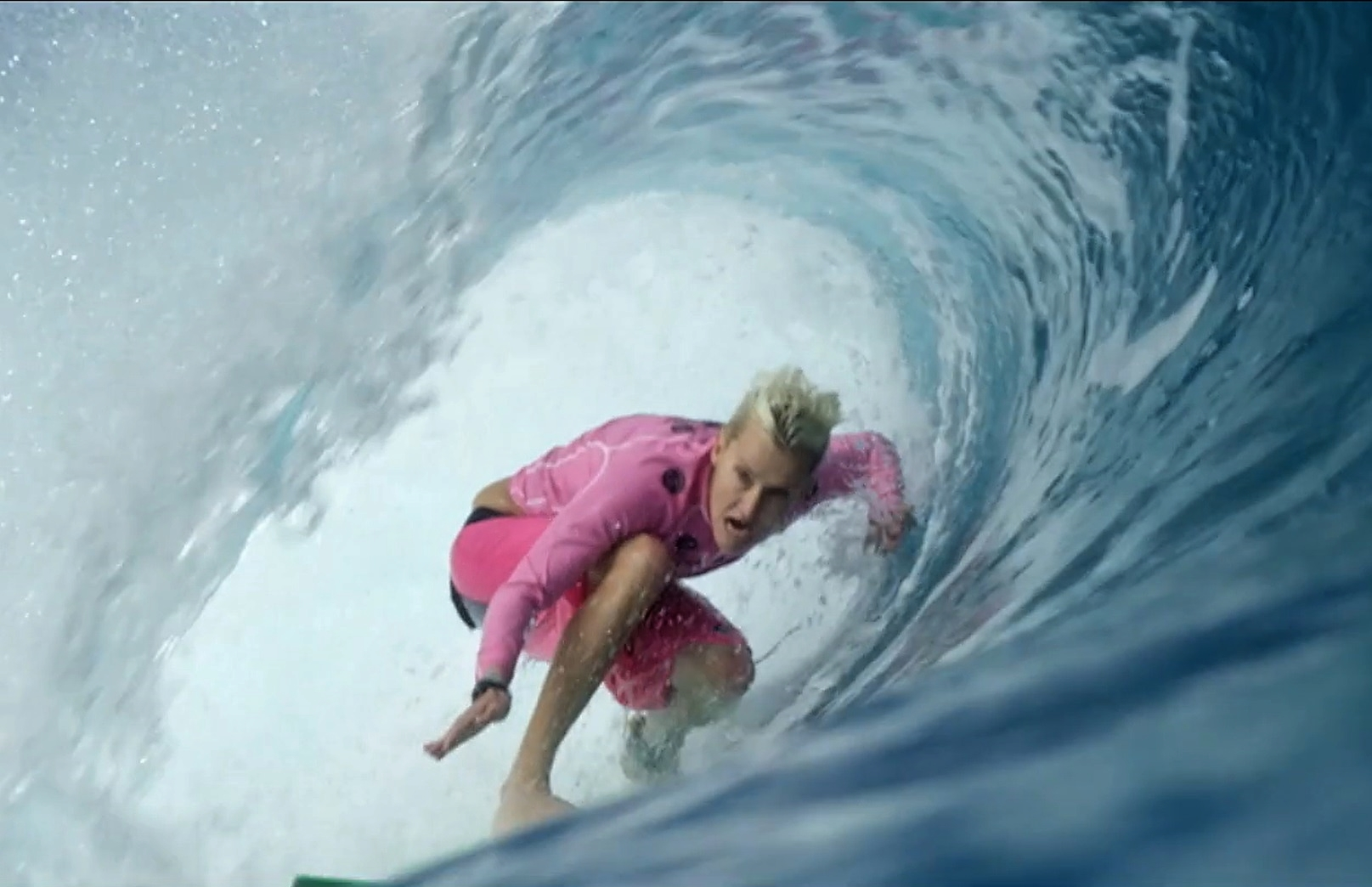
Kennelly tube riding in trailer for She is the Ocean, 2018 film

Kennelly turned professional at the age of 17 and soon began surfing in the World Qualifying Series (WQS). After finishing 2nd in the world on the WQS Tour in 1997, she was accepted to the World Championship Tour and quickly began earning victories at some of the tour's biggest events. Kennelly began a string of successful visits to Teahupoo, Tahiti in 1998 when she won the Gotcha Black Pearl Women's Pro. She would go on to win 3 more times in Teahupoo in 2000, 2002, and 2003.

2003 was a breakout year for Kennelly as she peaked at number 1 in the WCT rankings before ending the year ranked as the 2nd best female surfer in the world. In addition to her win in Teahupoo at the Billabong Pro, she garnered victories at the Roxy Pro in Fiji and the Turtle Bay Pro in Hawaii as well as a 3rd-place finish at the Maui Billabong Pro. Her various top finishes won Kennelly the year's coveted Triple Crown of Surfing. Kennelly maintained a spot in the top 10 of the ASP rankings through 2007, with numerous top finishes and groundbreaking female performances. This included a 2nd-place finish at the Billabong Pro Maui, a team gold medal at the 2007 Summer X Games, and a record-setting ride in 2005 as the first-ever woman to tow in at Teahupoo.

After leaving the World Championship Tour in 2007 to pursue acting, Kennelly returned to surfing as a professional freesurfer. She continued to make history for female surfing when she won the first women's big wave contest at the Nelscott Big Wave Classic in 2010, opening the door for more female big wave surfing competitions in the future. Later that year, Kennelly had a tow-in at Puerto Escondido that is considered to be arguably the best barrel by a female to date.

In 2011, Kennelly chased one of the biggest swells to ever hit Teahupoo. During that infamous 'Code Red' swell, she displayed the best barrel-riding by a female at Teahupoo. Three days later while riding in a memorial heat for Andy Irons during the Billabong Pro Men's WCT, Kennelly suffered a massive facial injury. After getting barreled, she was pushed down to Teahupoo's notoriously shallow reef and received a severe gash to the side of her face.

She was the female 2018 Big Wave World Champion.

She was invited to the 2018-2019 “The Eddie”, which was cancelled when waves that met the tournament criteria failed to arrive. In 2023, she was one of the first women to compete in “The Eddie”.

== Awards ==
Kennelly's accomplishments have garnered her numerous accolades, including being named the 2002 Female Surfer of the Year by ESPN and more recently, the 2011 and 2013 Billabong XXL Girls Performance Award, and the 2014 Billabong XXL Womens Performance Award. She was inducted into the Surfing Walk of Fame in Huntington Beach, California as 2013's Woman of the Year.

In 2016, she won the Pure Scot Barrel of the Year Award at the XXL Big Wave Awards for getting barreled at Teahupoo, Tahiti. This award made her the first woman to win at the Big Wave Awards in any open-gender category. Later that same year (2016) she was nominated for an ESPY Award.

== Acting career ==
Kennelly began her acting career with a role in the 2002 film, Blue Crush, and later landed a recurring role on the 2007 HBO series, John from Cincinnati. Besides these two acting roles, she has appeared as herself in a number of documentaries, including 7 Girls (2001) and Step Into Liquid (2003).

== DJ career ==
Following her role on John from Cincinnati in 2007, Kennelly began touring the world to pursue her music career as a DJ. She has played internationally at venues in Australia, France, South Africa, England, and Spain as well as domestically in Honolulu, Los Angeles, New York City, San Francisco, and San Diego. Her most notable appearances include opening for Snoop Dogg at Rain Nightclub at the Palms in Las Vegas, The Work Magazine Summer Rooftop Pool Party at The Standard in downtown Los Angeles, The Surfrider Foundation 2 Coasts 1 Ocean Event in the Hamptons and Malibu, The Primo Beer/Inertia Summer Rooftop Party opening for Y.A.H.T. in Venice Beach and opening for Boy Eats World at the Pacifico Beer Party at the US Open in July 2016.

DJKK's style is a mix of tropical "feel good" house, tech house, deep house and 80s remix, indie dance/new disco and pop remixes.

== TEDx Malibu ==
On December 3, 2013, at TEDx Malibu, Keala gave a presentation on desire and surfing: "I'm Keala Kennelly and I'm a surfer."

== Personal life ==
Kennelly is openly lesbian.
