= Cronulla =

- Suburb
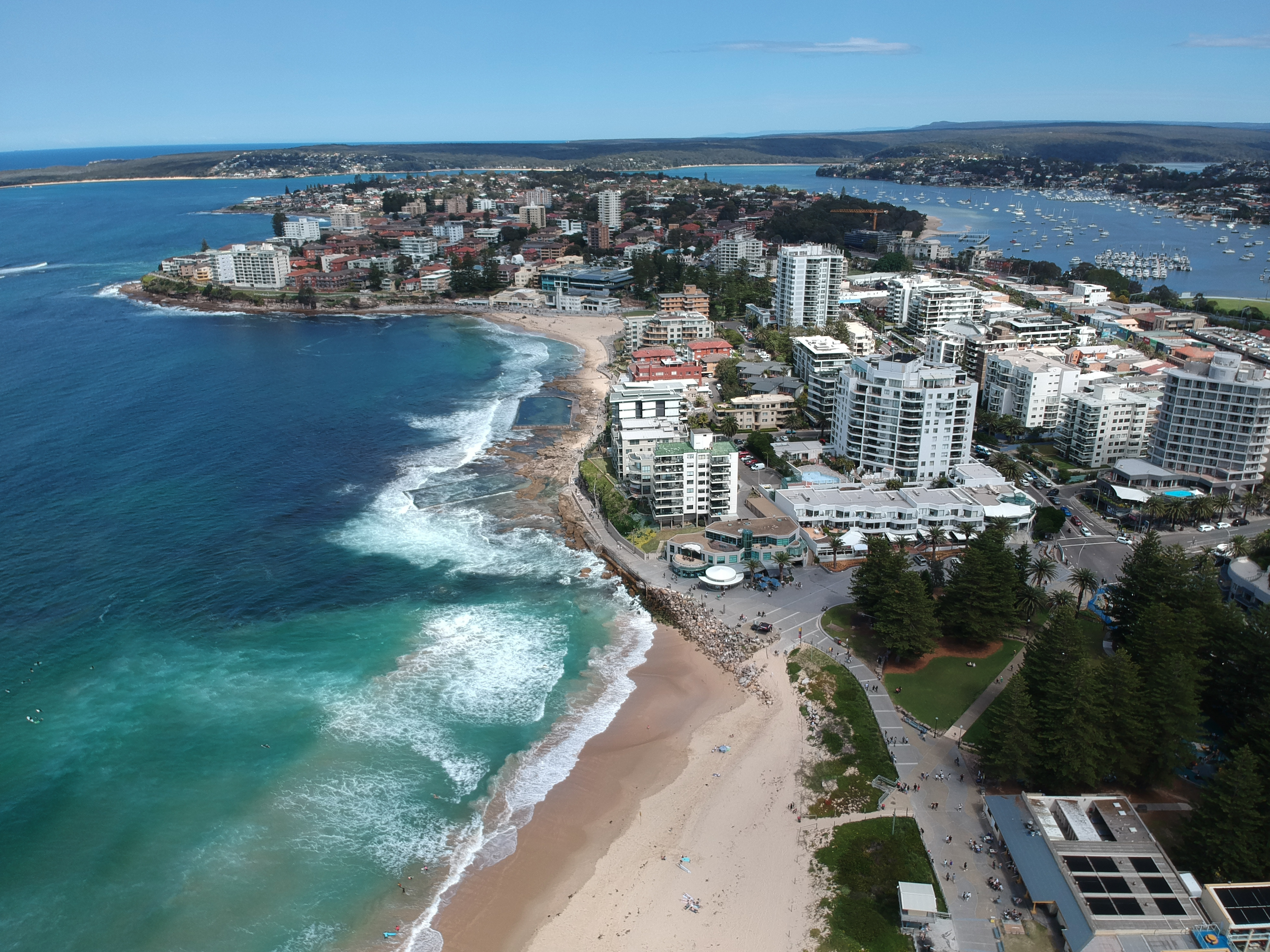
- Cronulla, New South Wales, pictured facing south in September 2019.

- Interactive map of Cronulla
- Coordinates: 34°03′04″S 151°09′08″E
- Country: Australia
- State: New South Wales
- City: Sydney
- LGA: Sutherland Shire
- Location: 26 km (16 mi) south of Sydney CBD
- Established: 1908

Government
  - State electorate: Cronulla
  - Federal division: Cook
- Elevation: 20 m (66 ft)

Population
  - Total: 17,899 (2021 census)
- Postcode: 2230
Suburbs around Cronulla
Caringbah	Kurnell	Greenhills Beach
Woolooware	Cronulla	Bate Bay
Burraneer	Maianbar	Bundeena

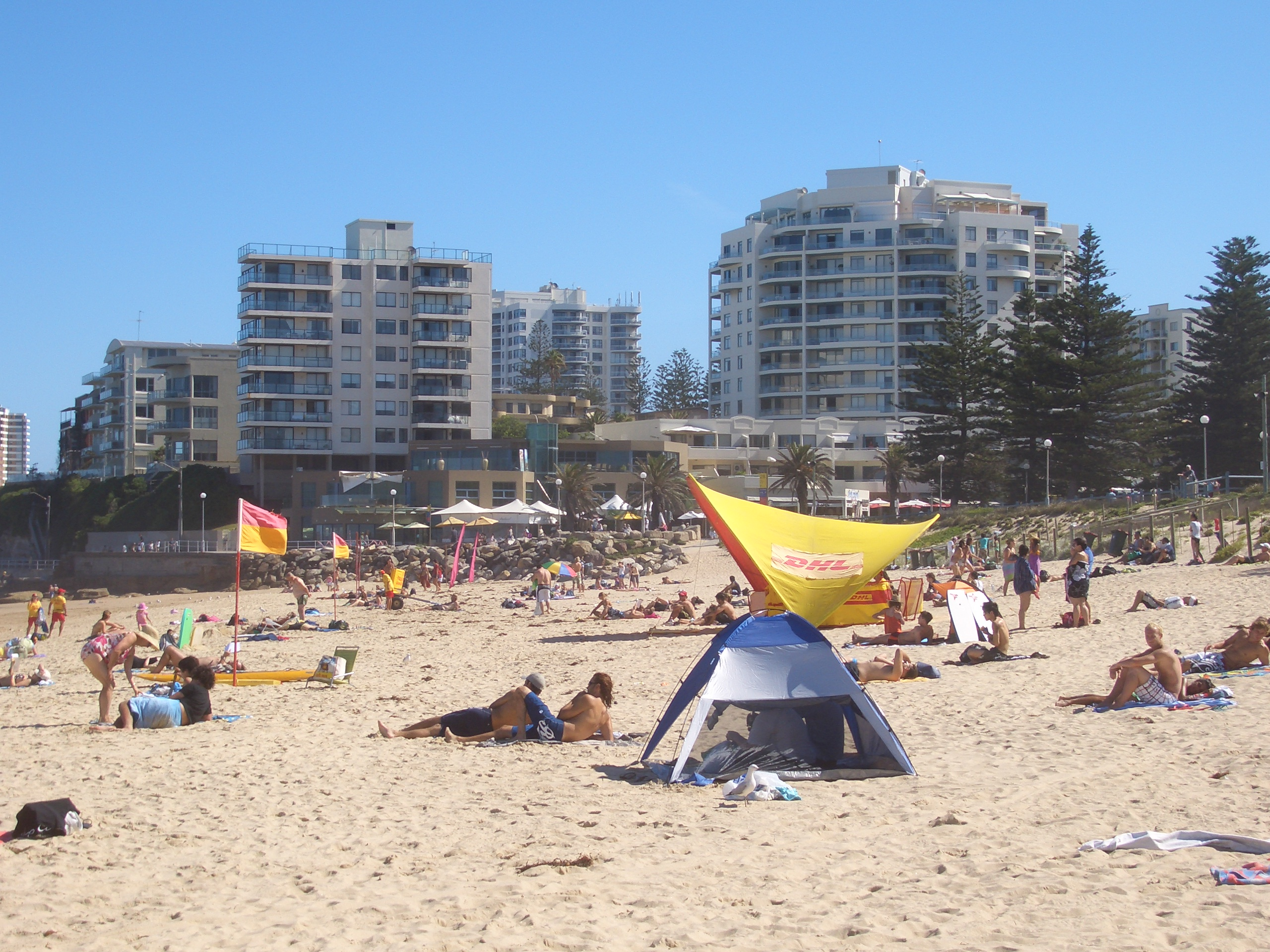
South end of North Cronulla Beach

Cronulla is the southernmost coastal suburb of Sydney, Australia, & sits at the mouth of the Hacking River. It boasts surf beaches, swimming spots & reef breaks, which attract both tourists and Greater Sydney residents. Located 26 km south of the Sydney central business district, the suburb is in the local government area of the Sutherland Shire.

Cronulla is situated at the southern end of a peninsula the northern end of which frames the southern half Botany Bay. Bate Bay opens on its eastern front while Port Hacking and Gunnamatta Bay lie behind it south & west. Neighbouring suburbs include Woolooware and Burraneer. The Kurnell headland, the site of the first landfall on the eastern coastline made by Captain James Cook in 1770, lies 8 km northeast of Cronulla & is served by Captain Cook Drive.

== History ==
The name 'Cronulla' is derived from the Aboriginal word Kurranulla, meaning "place of the small pink seashell" in the language of the area's Indigenous inhabitants, the Gweagal, who were a clan of the Tharawal (or Dharawal) people. They inhabited the southern reaches of Sydney and were displaced by the establishment of the British penal colony, owing to the Terra nullius mentality that has obtained since 1788. Significantly, the last camp of full blood Aborigines is said to have been located at nearby Kurnell late in the 19th century. The beaches were named by Surveyor Robert Dixon who surveyed here in 1827-28 and, by 1840, the main beach was already known as Karranulla. In July 1852 the schooner 'Venus' was wrecked on the beach, which newspaper reports referred to as 'Cooranulla'.

Matthew Flinders and George Bass explored and mapped the coastline and Port Hacking estuary in 1796; the southernmost point of Cronulla is named Bass and Flinders Point in their honour. Between 1821 and 1835 John Connell and his sons, what with grants and purchases, became the owners of all the land reaching from the Kurnell headland to present day Woolooware. His name - by deformation - is said to be the origin of the name 'Kurnell'. Between 1861 and 1875 Thomas Holt (1811–1888) purchased most of the land that stretched from Sutherland to Cronulla and Kurnell. Subsequently Holt built Sutherland House on the foreshore of Gwawley Bay at present-day Sylvania. His selling of the timber rights on his land starting from the 1860s, and his disastrous attempts fo run sheep and cattle on land that was wholly unsuitable led to the destruction of the original landscape of all of the land between Kurnell and Sutherland, including Cronulla. Few people today realise that the sandy hinterland scrub between Woolooware and Kurnell was once covered by stands of tall native trees. Holt was also responsible for introducing the rabbit to Australia, indeed another of his grand mansions, situated on the heights above Tempe, was named 'The Warren'. In 1888 master mariner Captain Joseph Henry Rounce Spingall became the pioneering resident of Cronulla when, with his family, he constructed the two-storey 'Oriental Guest House' on land above where today's North Cronulla Hotel sits. The Depression of 1890 and a lack of reliable transport access from Sutherland saw "The Captain's" pub sold. The Cronulla area was subdivided in 1895 and land was offered for sale at 10 pounds per acre. In 1899, the government named the area Gunnamatta, which means sandy hills. On 26 February 1908, it was officially changed to Cronulla and Gunnamatta was used for the name of the bay, on the western side.

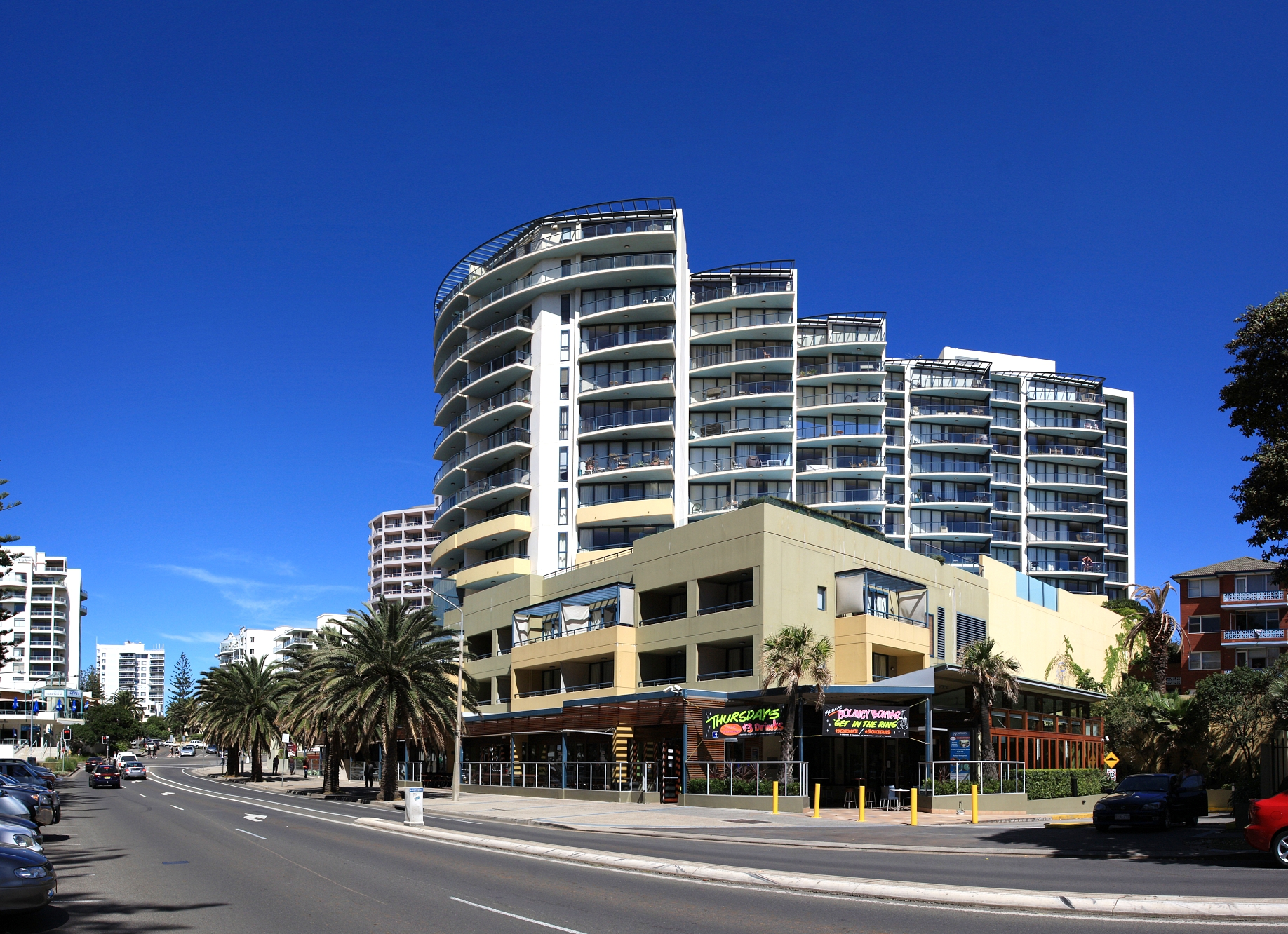
Northies Hotel

After the Illawarra railway line was built to Sutherland in 1885, the area became popular for picnics and swimming. Steam trams operated between Cronulla and Sutherland from 1911. Many regulars rented beach houses at Cronulla every year for school holidays. The Oriental Hotel was built by Captain Spingall in 1888, on the present site of apartments behind the North Cronulla Hotel. The Cecil Hotel was located on the foreshore of South Cronulla and the Ritz Café was popular with holiday-makers. The Cecil Apartments were built on the former site of this hotel. The steam trams were replaced by the Cronulla branch of the Illawarra railway line when it opened in 1939.

The post office opened in January 1891, known as Cronulla Beach, but closed in 1893. It reopened in 1907 and the name was officially changed to Cronulla in 1929.

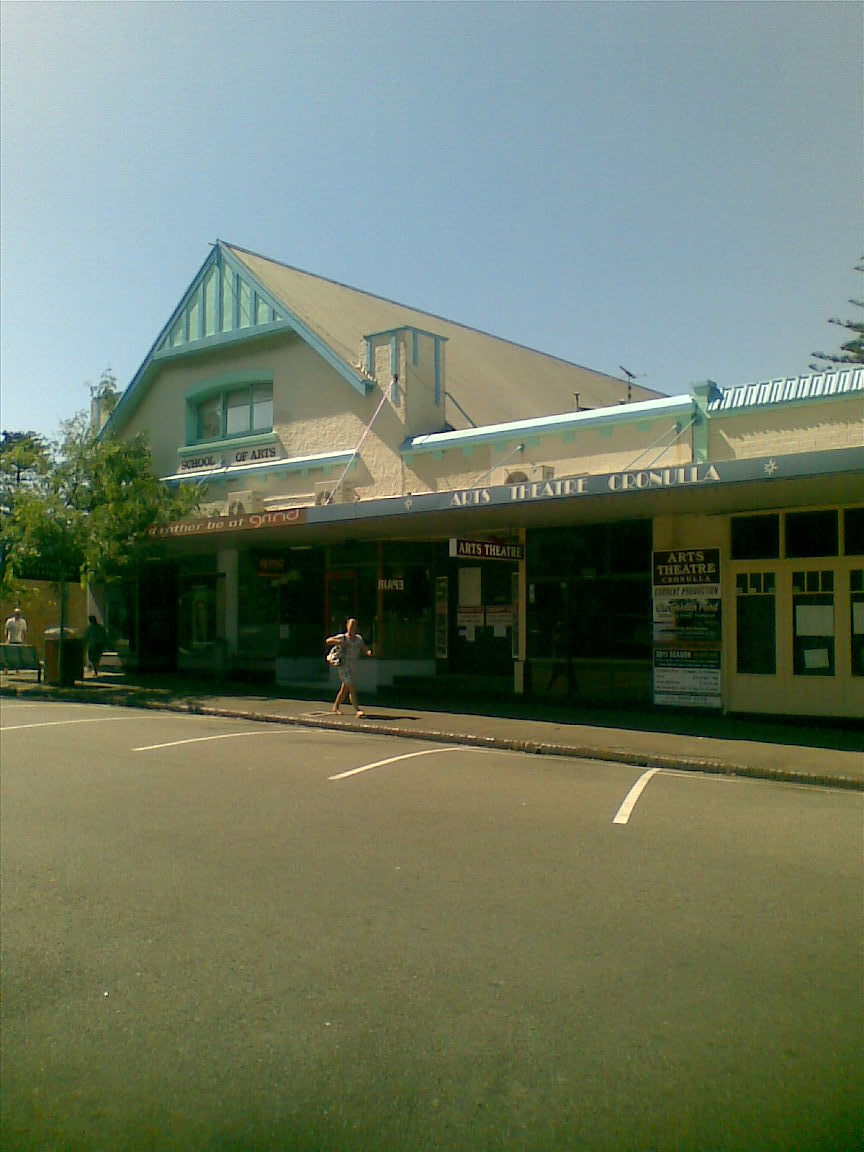
Cronulla School of Arts Est 1904

The Cronulla School of Arts was established in 1904. The original wooden building was demolished and replaced by the current School of Arts building in November 1912 and is now one of the oldest buildings in Cronulla.

The first public school opened in 1910. In 1955, Cronulla Library opened. From the 1950s, many of the guest houses began being replaced by high rise flats. Even though it developed as a residential area, Cronulla remained popular with beachgoers and tourists. Several hotels, motels and serviced apartments operate today. The Cronulla Bicentennial Plaza opened in February 1989.

In 2005 the beachfront at Cronulla was the scene of widely publicised mob disturbances and violent confrontations. These incidents continued over a number of days and also spread to other areas in Sydney.

On 11 January 1965 two 15-year old girls, Christine Sharrock and Marianne Schmidt, were stabbed to death in the dunes at nearby Wanda. The case remains one of the most absorbing unsolved murders in the annals of Australian crime, so much so that in professional circles it has come to be known simply as 'Wanda'.

== Heritage listings ==
Cronulla has a number of heritage-listed sites, including:

- Captain Cook Drive: Cronulla sand dunes
- Cronulla School of Arts 1912: Arts Theatre Cronulla, community theatre, amateur theatre, Cronulla, Sutherland Shire, Sydney, New South Wales
- Cronulla railway: Cronulla railway station
- 41 Cronulla Street: Cronulla Post Office
- 202 Nicholson Parade: Cronulla Fisheries Centre

== Beaches ==
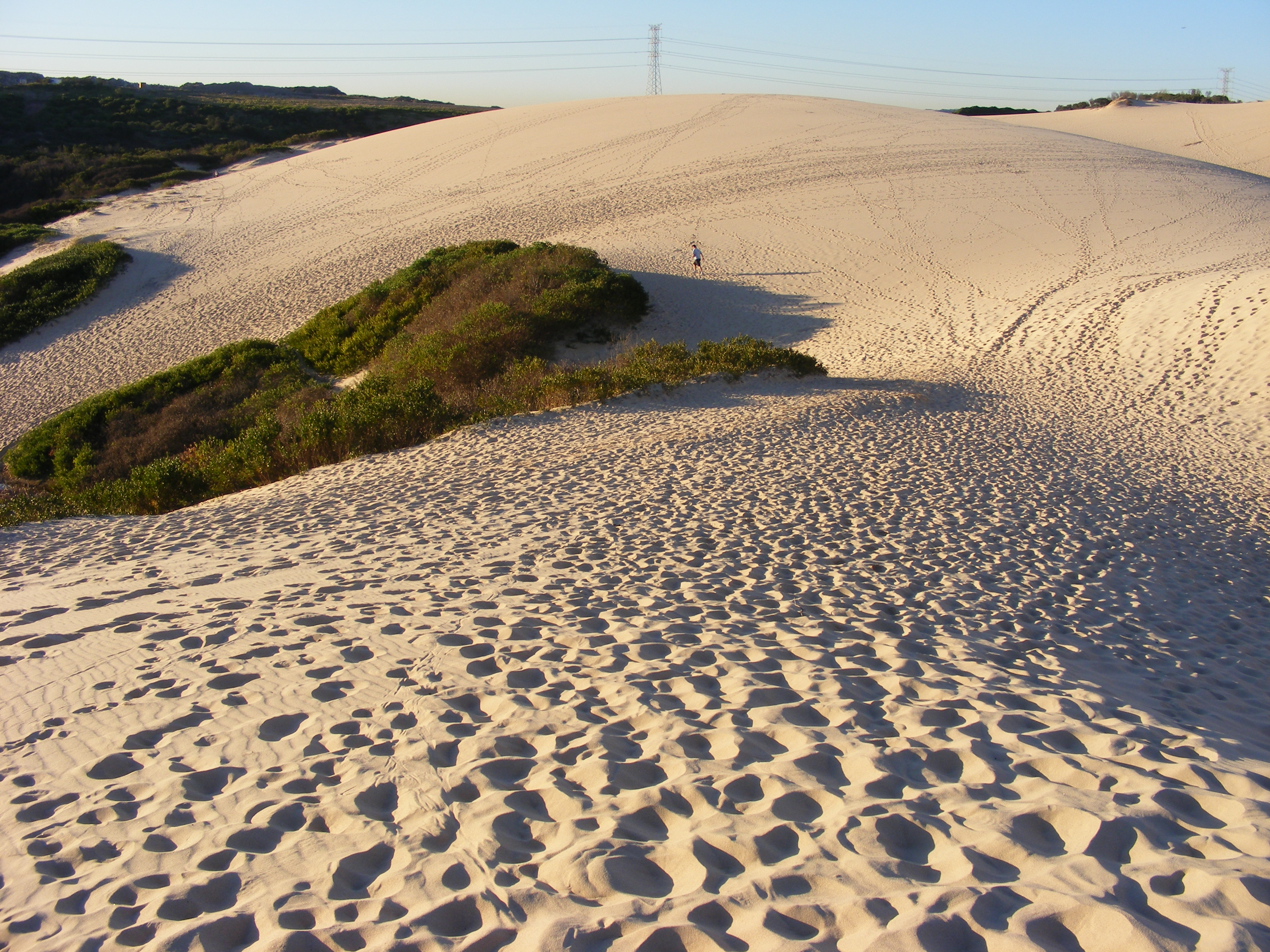
Greenhills Beach Sand Dunes

Cronulla is a popular tourist attraction and attracts many beachgoers from all over Sydney. Cronulla Beach features a long stretch of sand that runs from Boat Harbour to North Cronulla, followed by rock pools and another sandy beach at South Cronulla. The beaches of Cronulla from north to south are: Boat Harbour, Greenhills Beach, Wanda Beach, Elouera Beach, North Cronulla Beach, Cronulla Beach, Blackwoods Beach, Shelly Beach and Oak Park Beach. Local names also apply to various parts of the beach, such as The Alley, between Cronulla Beach and North Cronulla, The Wall, between North Cronulla and Elouera, Midway, between Elouera and Wanda,Sandshoes, near the mouth of the Port Hacking estuary, Voodoo Reef and The Point. The beaches are popular recreational areas for swimming, surfing, bodyboarding, bodysurfing and other water sports.

Shark Island, just off Cronulla Beach, is a famous surfing and bodyboarding spot, and the site of the annual Shark Island Challenge bodyboarding contest. Gunnamatta Bay provides protected swimming at the baths off Gunnamatta Park. Port Hacking is a popular location for such water sports as waterskiing and wakeboarding.

== Parks ==
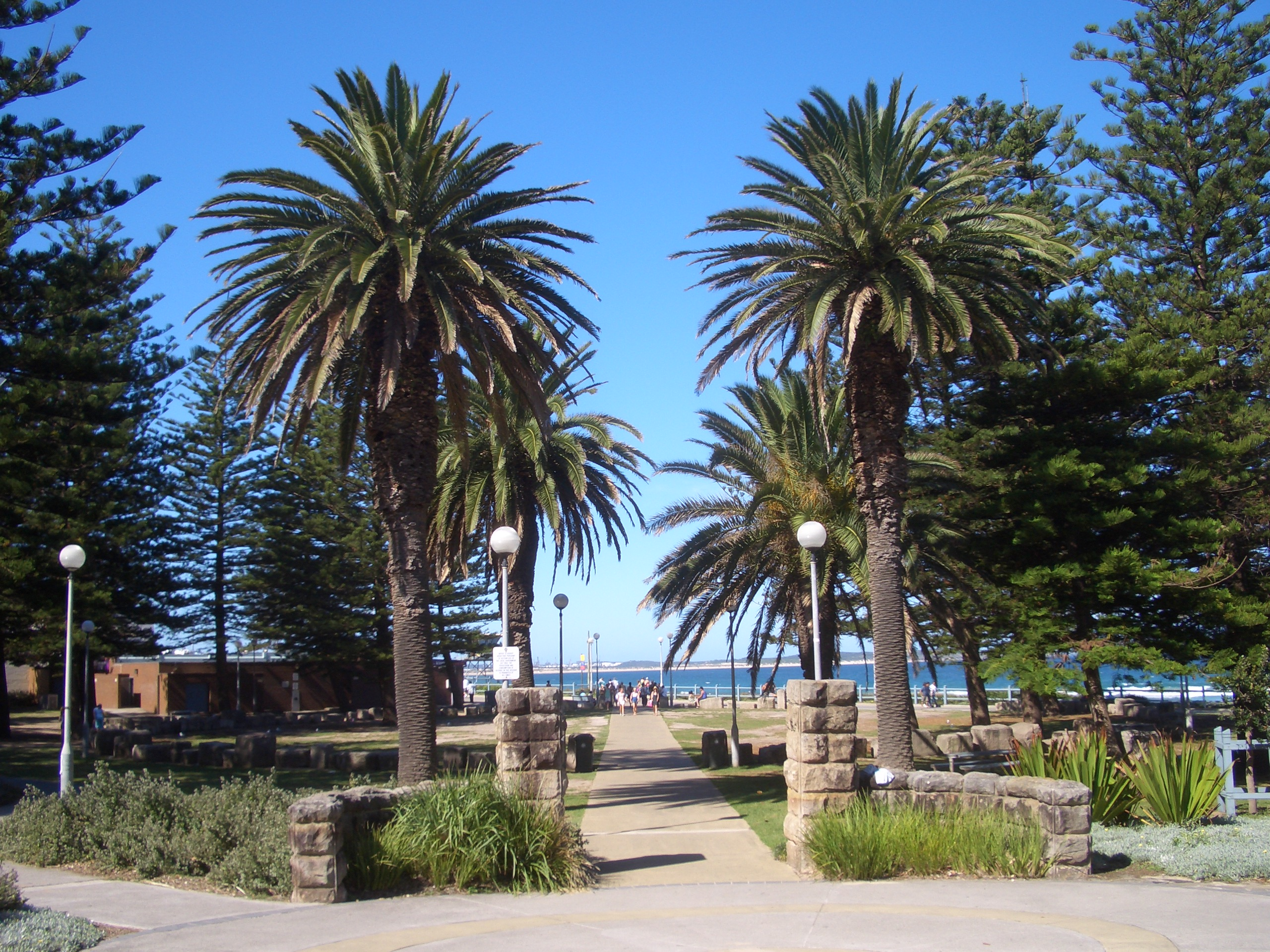
Dunningham Park, North Cronulla

- Bass & Flinders Point is the southernmost part of Cronulla and features a monument to explorers George Bass and Matthew Flinders, who explored the Port Hacking estuary.
- Darook Park, Gunnamatta Park and Tonkin Park are all located on Gunnamatta Bay.

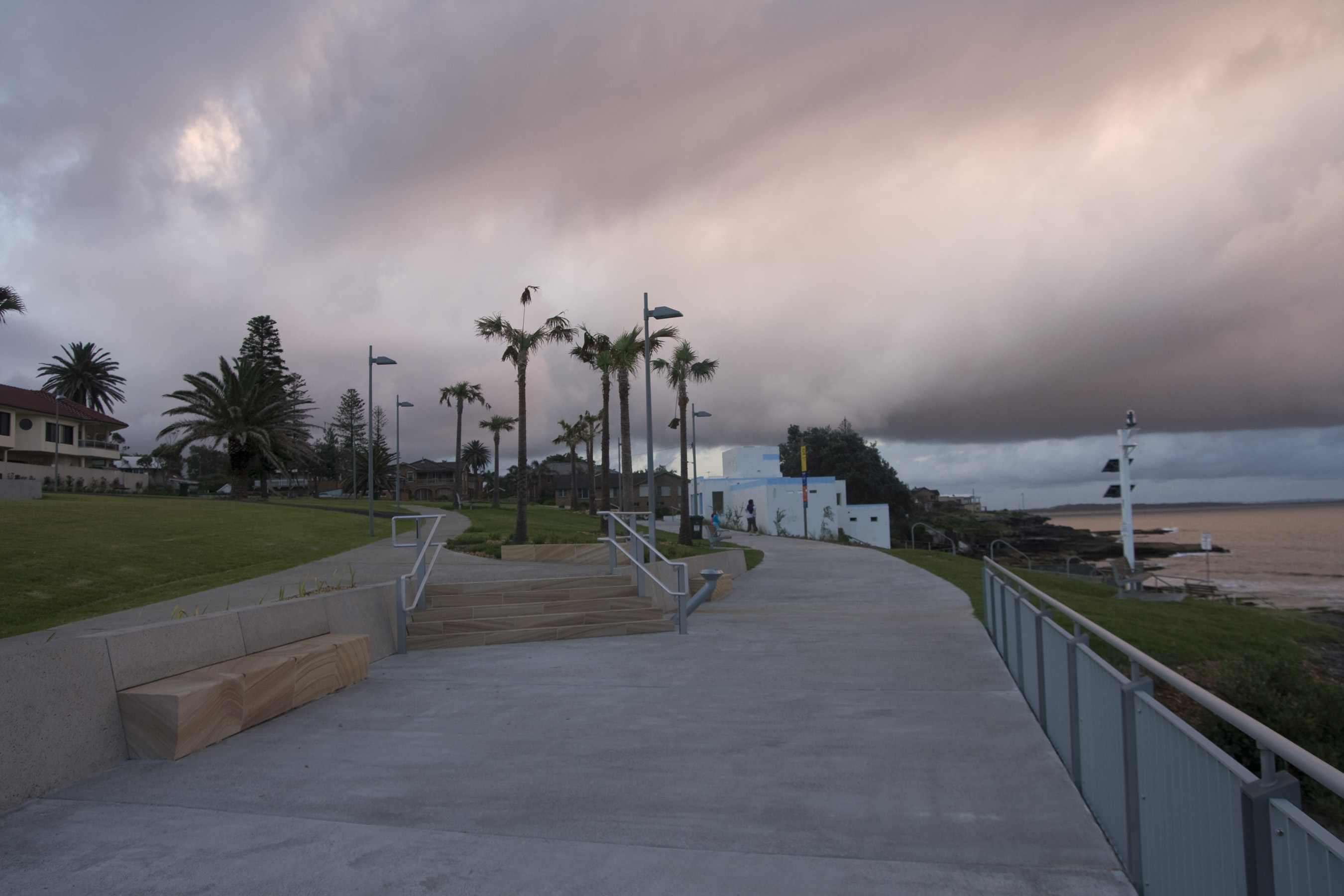
Oak Park, South Cronulla

- Cronulla Park is located behind the beach at South Cronulla.
- Dunningham Park sits behind the beach at North Cronulla, shaded by large Norfolk Island pines. It features a children's playground, picnic tables and a kiosk.
- Monro Park, featuring the Cronulla War Memorial, is located opposite Cronulla railway station.
- Don Lucas Reserve is located beside the car park at Wanda Beach, popular for sport and recreational activities such as flying kites.
- Shelly Park sits behind Shelley Beach.
- Oak Park is shorewards of well known surfing spot Sandshoes.
- Hungry Point Reserve at the end of Nicholson Parade.

== Commercial area ==
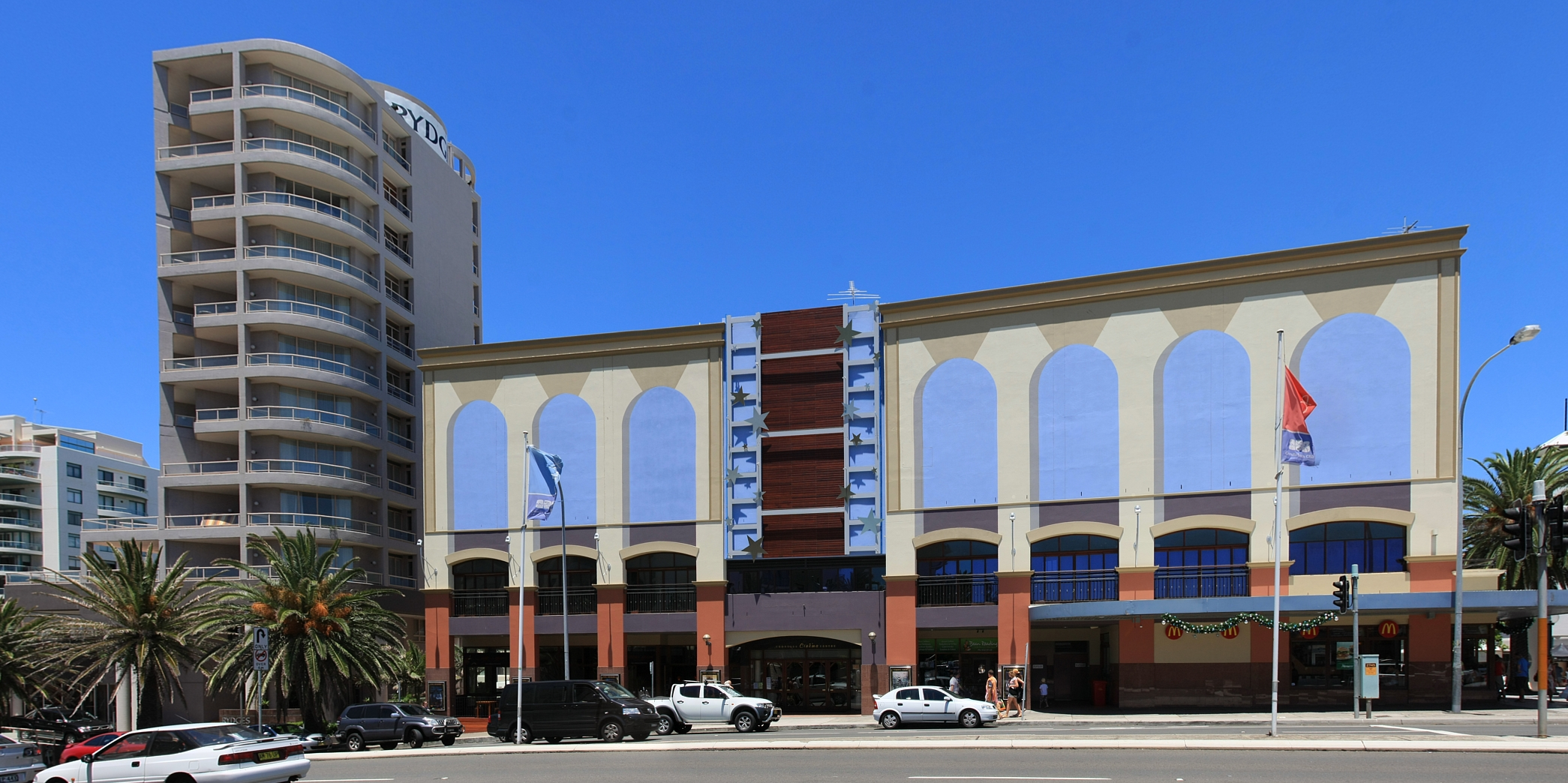
Cronulla Theatre and Cronulla Plaza

The main shopping strip runs along Cronulla Street, which has been partly converted into a pedestrian mall known as Cronulla Plaza. It also extends along the Kingsway, Gerrale Street and other surrounding streets. Cronulla has developed a café culture, with some cafés and restaurants located along the North Cronulla foreshore and Cronulla Plaza. The suburb boasts a Rydges high-rise hotel, although tourists can choose from a variety of hotels, motels and serviced apartments. Cronulla has many restaurants, pubs and bars, as well as a Hoyts cinema that opened late-2020.

== Transport ==
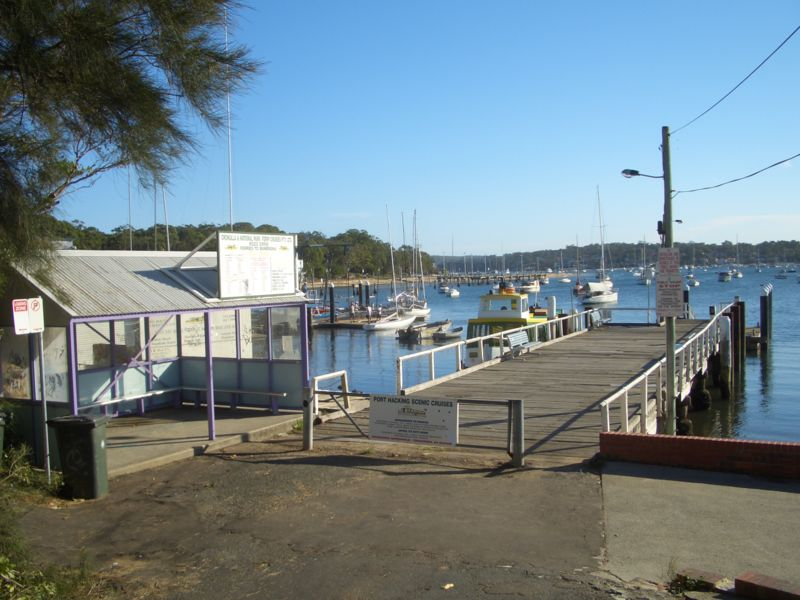
Cronulla Ferry Wharf

Trains terminate at Cronulla railway station on the Cronulla branch of the Illawarra railway line, on the Sydney Trains network. Cronulla Tunnel Gallery is just north of the station, linking Cronulla Street to Tonkin Street.

Cronulla & National Park Ferry Cruises runs passenger services around Port Hacking and a regular route between Cronulla and Bundeena, on the edge of the Royal National Park. The Cronulla Ferry wharf sits on Gunnamatta Bay, beside Tonkin Park.

U-Go Mobility operates several bus routes that stop at Cronulla Railway Station. For full details of all bus services see Cronulla station.

== Sport and recreation ==
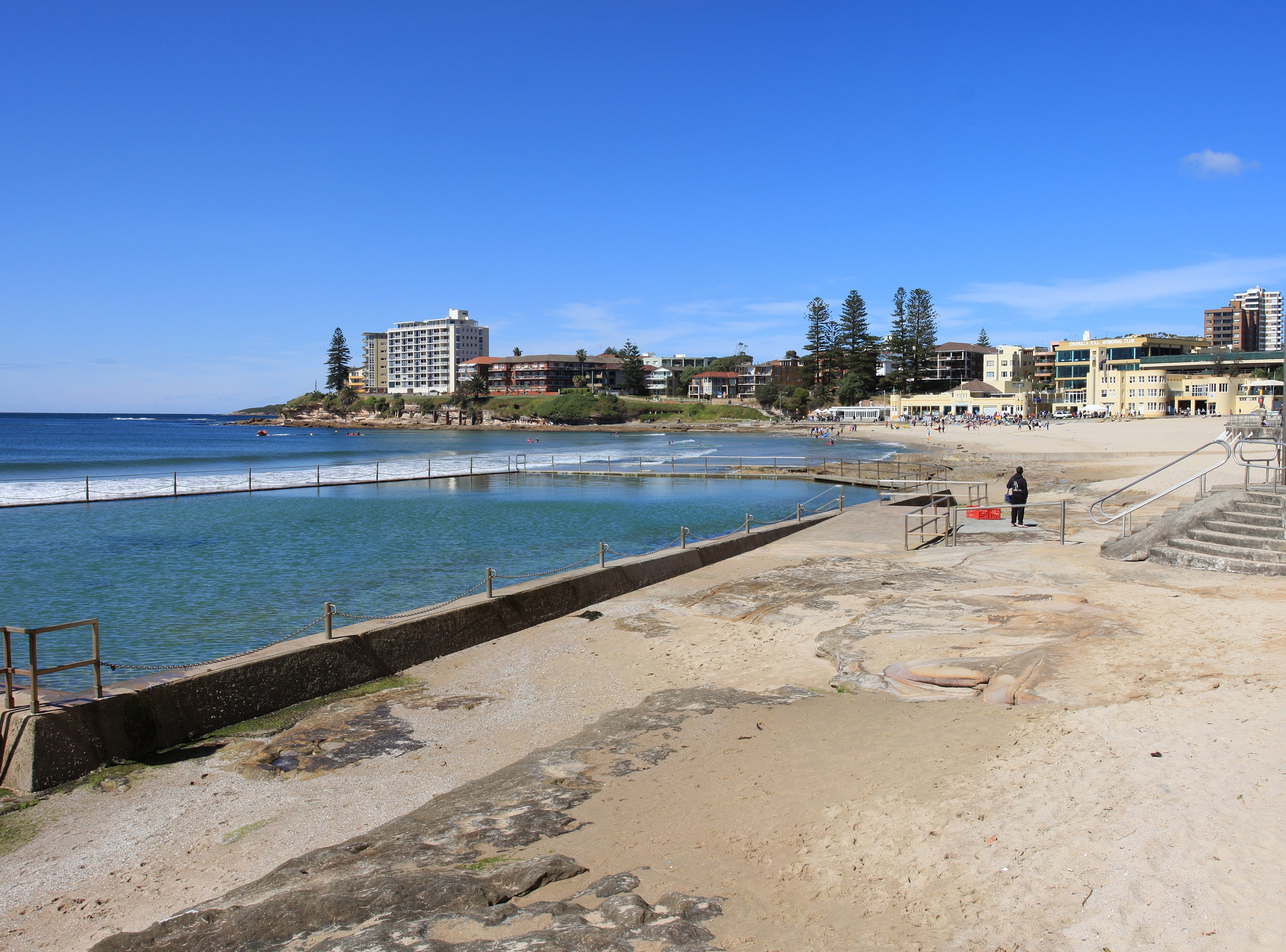
Cronulla Beach and rock pool

- The local National Rugby League football club is the Cronulla-Sutherland Sharks. The Cronulla-Sutherland League's Club and home ground, Endeavour Field, are located on Captain Cook Drive at Woolooware.
- Cronulla-Sutherland Junior Baseball Little League represented Australia in the 2015 Little League World Series where they had a record of one win and two losses.
- Surf lifesaving clubs are located along the beach at Wanda, Elouera, North Cronulla and South Cronulla.
- Many soccer clubs are located in the Cronulla district, the most prominent being Cronulla Seagulls FC and the Cronulla RSL clubs.
- Surfing plays a major role in Cronulla. Famous professional surfer and 1999 world champion Mark Occhilupo ('Occy') grew up surfing in Cronulla. Many surfboard shapers hand craft their surfboards in Cronulla and the Sutherland Shire and Cronulla Beach holds the Australian Boardriders Battle on Australia Day.
- The annual Shark Island Challenge bodyboarding contest and the annual Shark Island Swim Challenge are held at Cronulla Beach.
- The Cronulla International Cycling Grand Prix has been held in Cronulla since 2006. In 2009 it was also the Australian National Criterium Championships.
- The Bate Bay Body Bashers are a Bodysurfing club based in Cronulla. They compete in team bodysurfing competitions against other Australian clubs including the East Sydney Bodysurfers and the Northern Beaches Wompers. They were Australian Champions in 2017.
- The Cronulla Polar Bears Winter Swimming Club compete against Bondi Icebergs Winter Swimming Club, South Maroubra Dolphins Winter Swimming Club, Clovelly Eskimos Winter Swimming Club, Maroubra Seals Winter Swimming Club, Coolangatta Surf Life Saving Club, Coogee Penguins Winter Swimming Club, Bronte Splashers, Wollongong Whales and Cottesloe Crabs in the Winter Swimming Association of Australia Championships
- The Sutherland Shire is also home to a number of Rugby Union Clubs led by Southern Districts Rebels, who participate in the Shute Shield competition. It also has a number of junior teams competing in Sydney Juniors Union and many senior clubs who play in the NSW Suburban Rugby Union competition.

== Events ==
- Cronulla Spring Festival is held every year on the second weekend of September. It includes free entertainment, food and many variety stalls.
- Opera on the Beach is an event commonly held at Cronulla as part of the nation's Australia Day celebrations.
- Arts Theatre Cronulla produces four plays per year since 1963

== Culture ==
Ornithologist, artist & writer Neville William Cayley (1886–1950) was long associated with Cronulla. A founding member of the local Surf Lifesaving Club he was the creator of a book that is unique of its kind: What Bird is That? First published in 1931 by Angus & Robertson it has seen many reprints since then & remains today (2026) a reference work known worldwide. Cayley produced the illustrations & concise texts that fill some 300 in-ocatavo pages, documenting the birdlife of Australia & its offshore perimeter. He set out to produce a book for beginners, not specialists: 'He who humbles himself shall be exalted'.

Legendary surfer Bobby Brown (1946–1967) lived all of his life in Cronulla. One of the most gifted riders of his generation, he brought natural style and grace to surfing and died just as the shortboard revolution kicked off. There is a superb still by photographer & film maker Albie Falzon that catches him locked in at Angourie in 1963. Show it to seasoned boardriders even today & 90% of them would say he is riding a shortboard. He died after receiving a head wound inflicted by a beer glass in a pub fight at nearby Taren Point. In 2020 a Memorial Lookout at Wanda Beach was named after him; it commands a 180° panoramic view of Bate Bay, a stone's throw from Girrilang Road where Bobby grew up.

== Film & TV ==
- In the late 1930s veteran Australian film maker Charles Chauvel shot most of his classic Forty Thousand Horsemen in the dunes north-east of Wanda. The cavalrymen & their mounts, on loan from the Army for just one day, arrived by train at Cronulla & bivouacked at nearby Gunnamatta Park.
- Puberty Blues is a book about the surfing culture in the Sutherland Shire. It was made into a film by Bruce Beresford in 1981.
- Significant scenes from Mad Max Beyond Thunderdome by George Miller & George Oglivie (1985) were shot in the Wanda-Kurnell sand dunes.
- The Australia's Next Top Model (Cycle 4) house was situated on Gunnamatta Bay.
- The Shire is a reality TV show with Cronulla as its main setting; its filming commenced in early 2012.

== Demographics ==
According to the 2021 census, there were 17,899 people in Cronulla.

- Aboriginal and Torres Strait Islander people made up 1.5% of the population.
- The most common ancestries were English 41.5%, Australian 33.4%, Irish 15.3%, Scottish 10.4% and Italian 5.0%
- 78.6% of people were born in Australia. The most common other countries of birth were England 3.6%, New Zealand 1.6%, Brazil 0.7% and the United States of America and South Africa at 0.6%.
- 85.9% of people only spoke English at home. Other languages spoken at home included, Spanish 1%, Greek 0.9%, Portuguese 0.8%, and Italian 0.6%.
- The most common responses for religion were No Religion 37.6%, Catholic 26.2%, and Anglican 15.5%.
- The median weekly household income was 18% higher than the national median at $2,058.
- Real estate costs were correspondingly high; the median mortgage repayments were $2,404 compared to the national median of $1,863.
- Of occupied private dwellings in Cronulla, 72.5% were flats or apartments, 20.5% were separate houses and 6.1% were semi-detached.

== Notable residents ==
- Tom Jay Williams, singer, songwriter and model
- Scott Morrison, 30th Prime Minister of Australia
- Luke Baines, actor, singer and model
- Lara Bingle, model, former partner of cricketer Michael Clarke
- Brendan Cowell, actor, appeared on Love My Way and Game of Thrones
- Aileen Griffiths OAM, community worker and organiser
- Daniel MacPherson, Australian actor, TV presenter, notable for being in City Homicide and Dancing with the Stars
- Chris McCormack, ironman, triathlete
- Craig Alexander, ironman, triathlete
- Toni Pearen, TV presenter, actress
- Ben McNeill, film producer
- Jai Waetford, former singer, former actor, appeared onHome and Away
- Myles Pollard, actor, appeared on McLeod's Daughters
- Jason Stevens, former Cronulla-Sutherland Sharks player
- Sharni Vinson, actress, appeared on Home and Away
- Damian Keogh, former Australian basketball captain and CEO of Hoyts cinema group and Val Morgan
- Steve Waugh, former Australian Cricket Captain
- Krystal Forscutt, former Australian model
- Beau Ryan, former rugby league player, television presenter
- Valentine Holmes, Rugby league player
- Gough Whitlam & his wife Margaret Dovey lived at South Cronulla in the early 1950s
- Bill Madden, Soldier and George Cross recipient

== Schools ==
Cronulla is home to a number of primary and secondary schools:

- Cronulla High School
- St Aloysius College, Cronulla
- Our Lady of Mercy College
- Cronulla Public School
- Cronulla South Public School
- St Francis De Sales
- Burraneer Bay Public School
- St Aloysius Catholic Primary School

== Churches ==
There are several churches in the Cronulla area:

- St Andrews Anglican Church
- St Aloysius Catholic Church
- Cronulla Baptist Church
- Cronulla Uniting Church
- Presbyterian War Memorial Church
- C3 Church Cronulla
- Establish Church

== Gallery ==
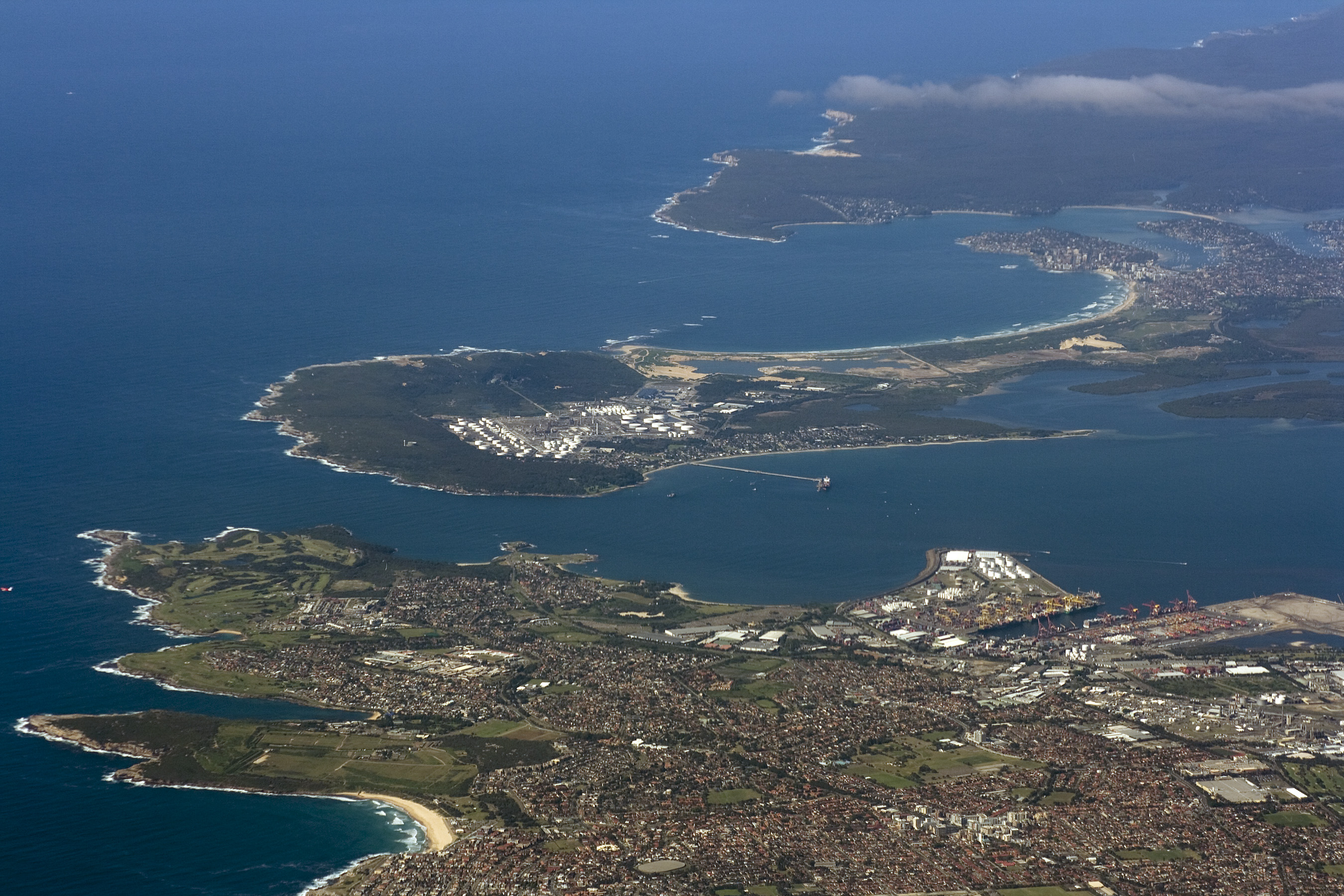

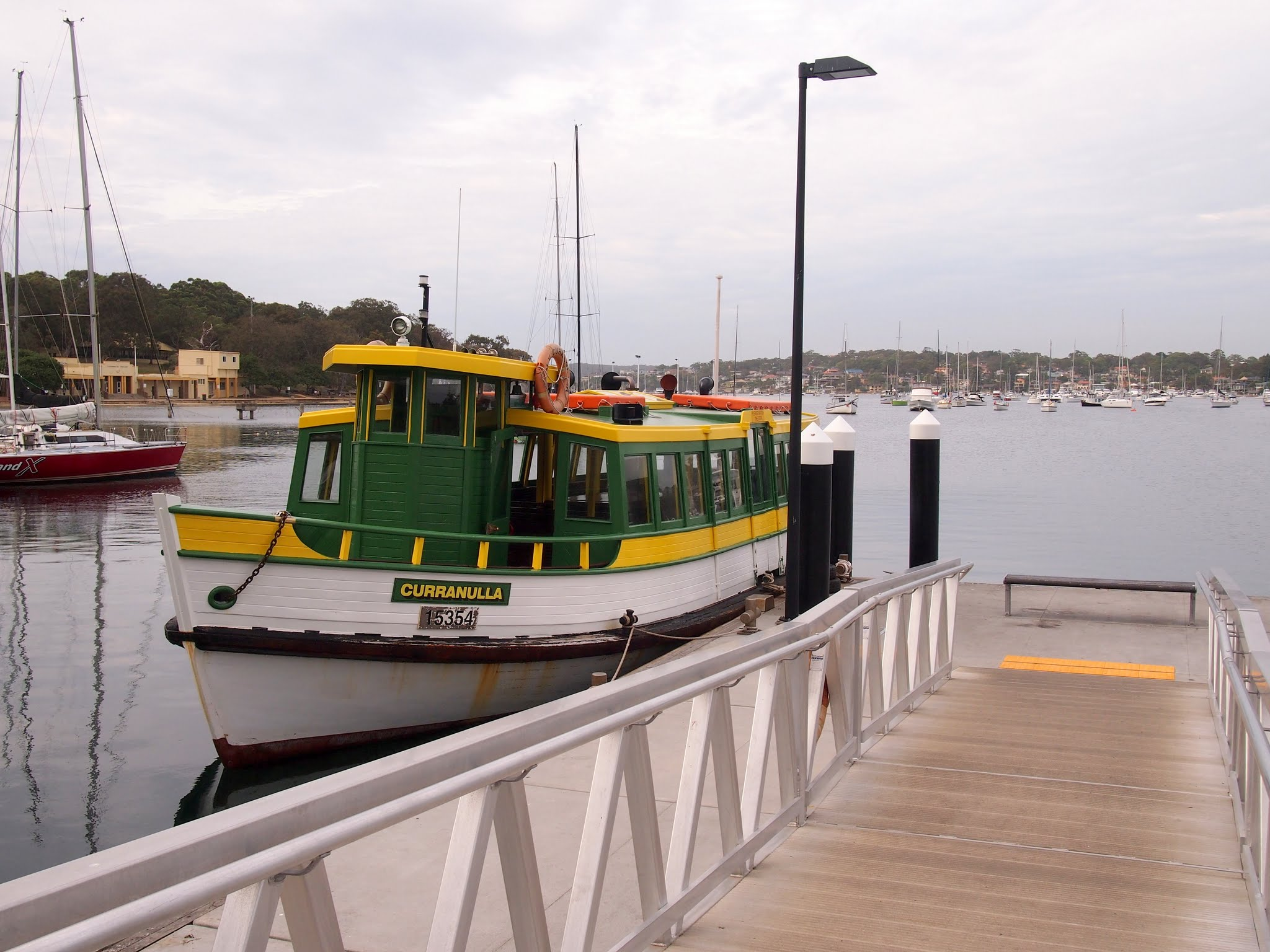

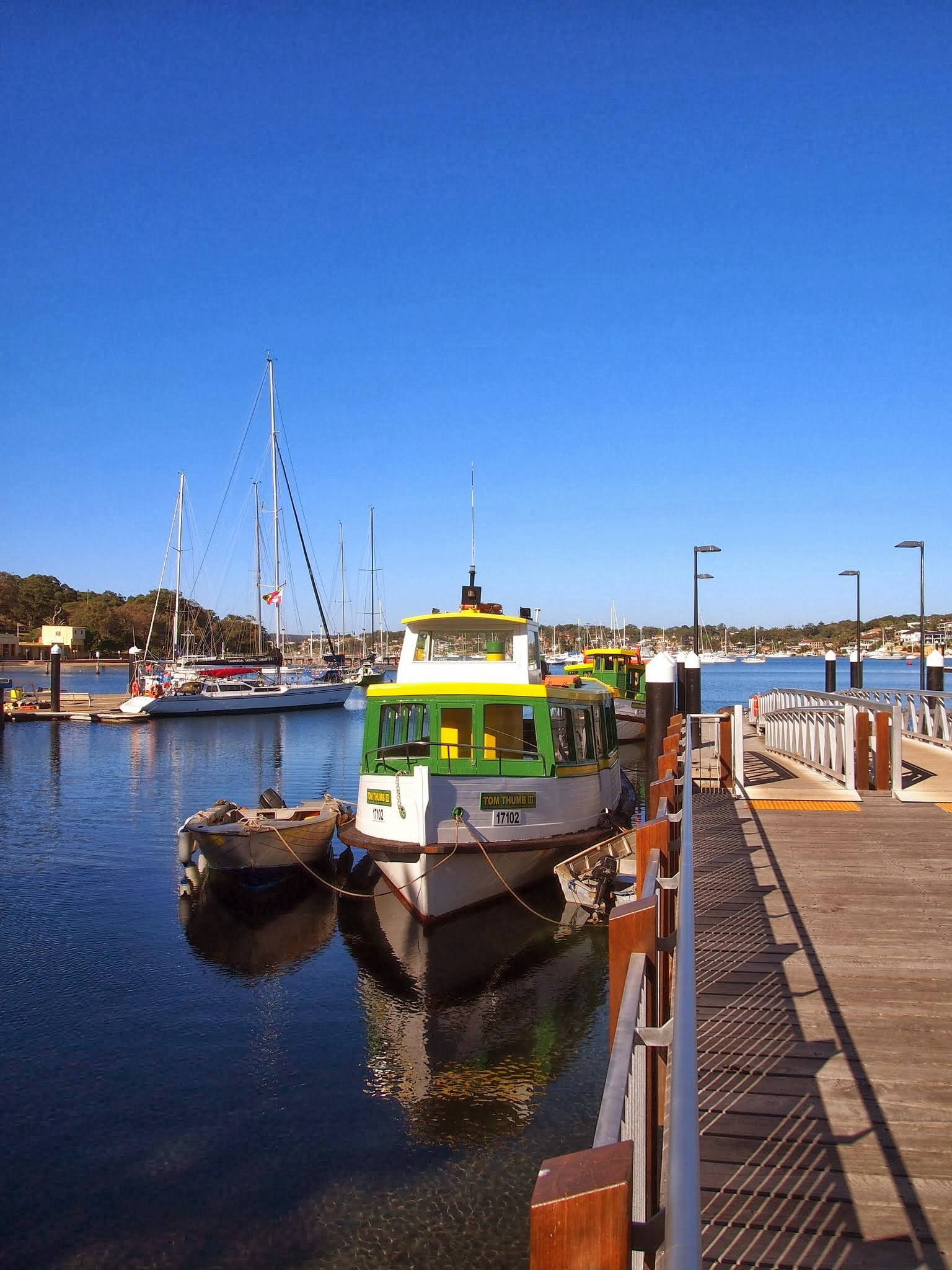

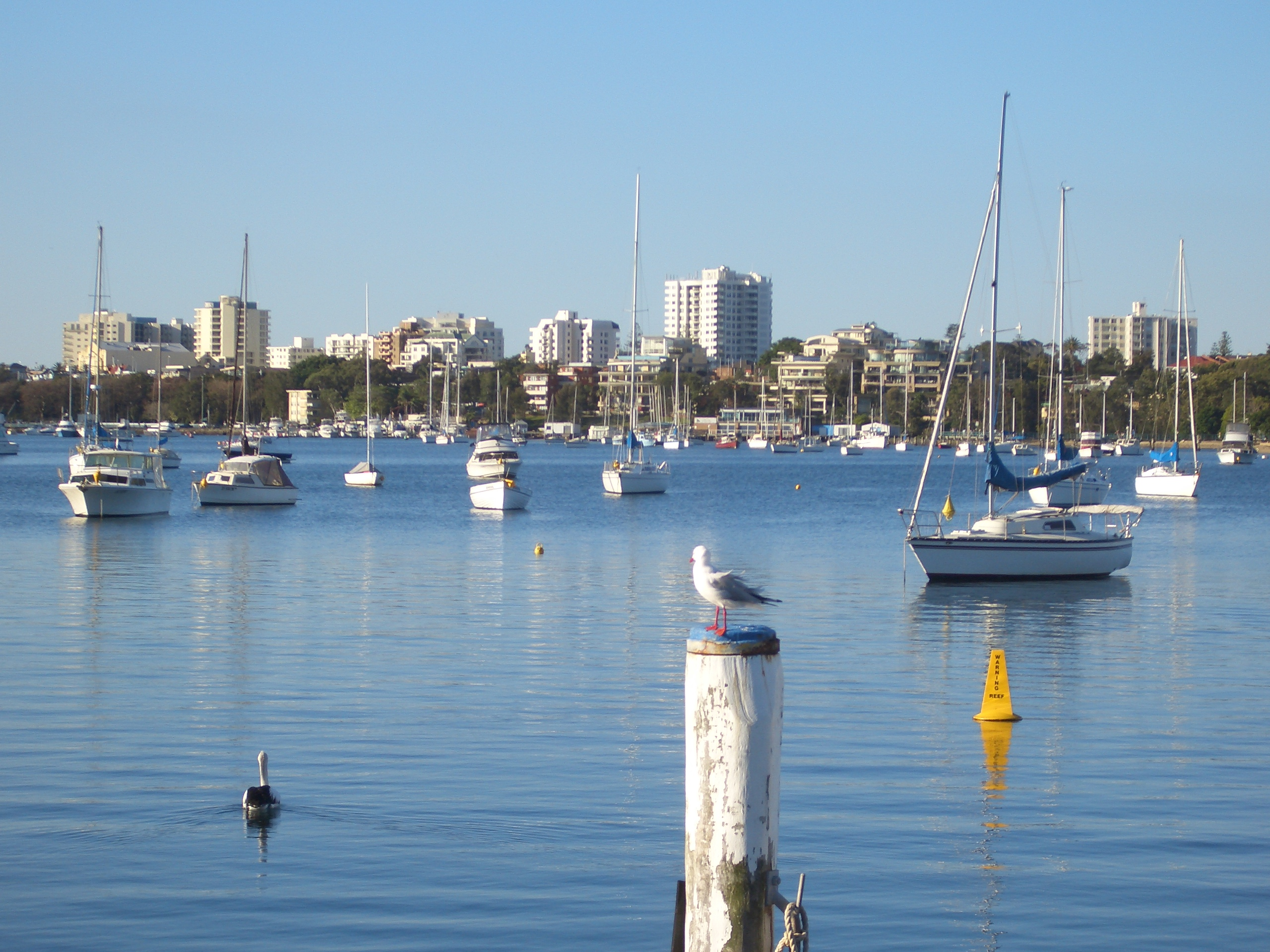
View of Cronulla from Burraneer #1

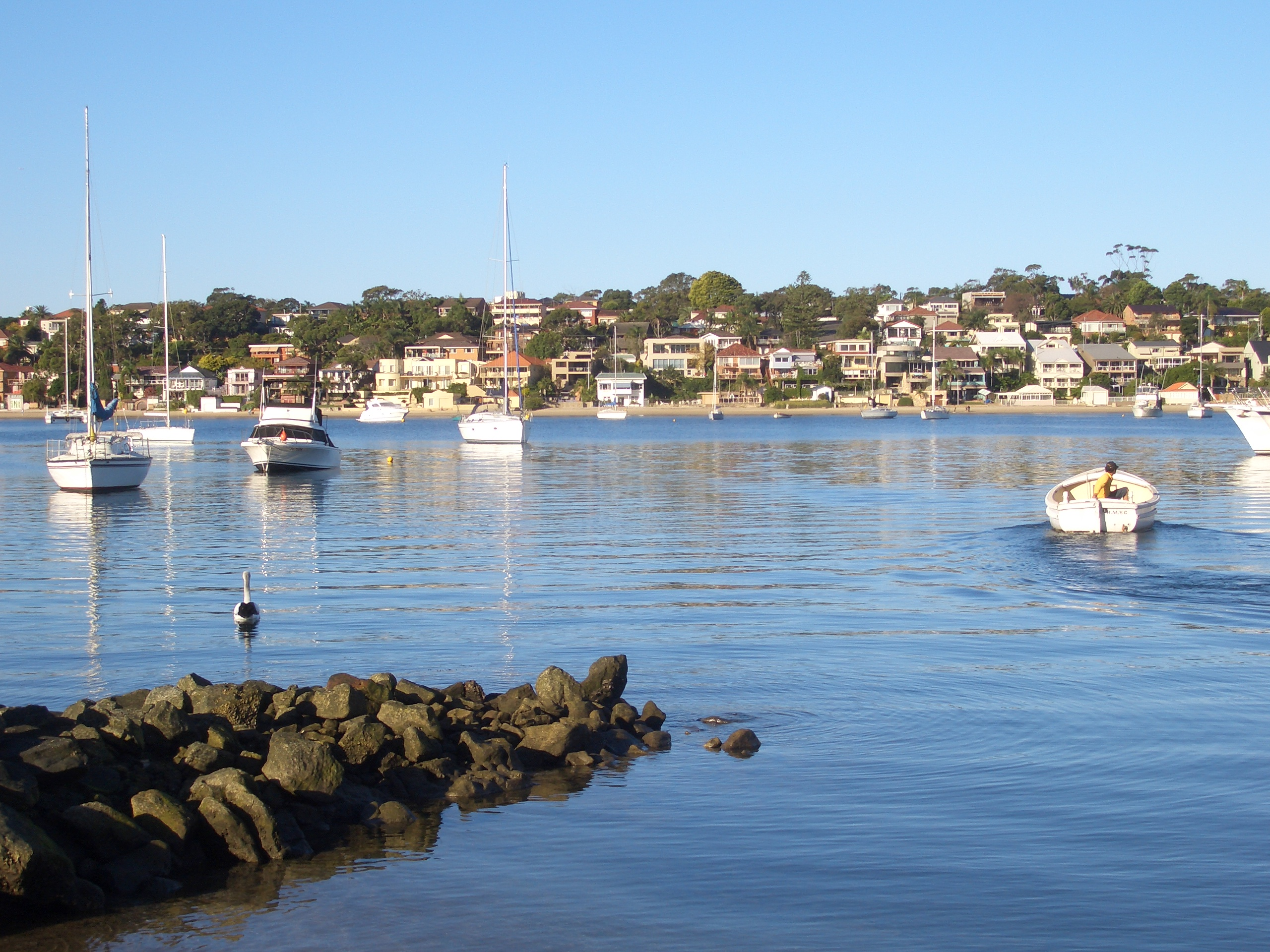
View of Cronulla from Burraneer #2

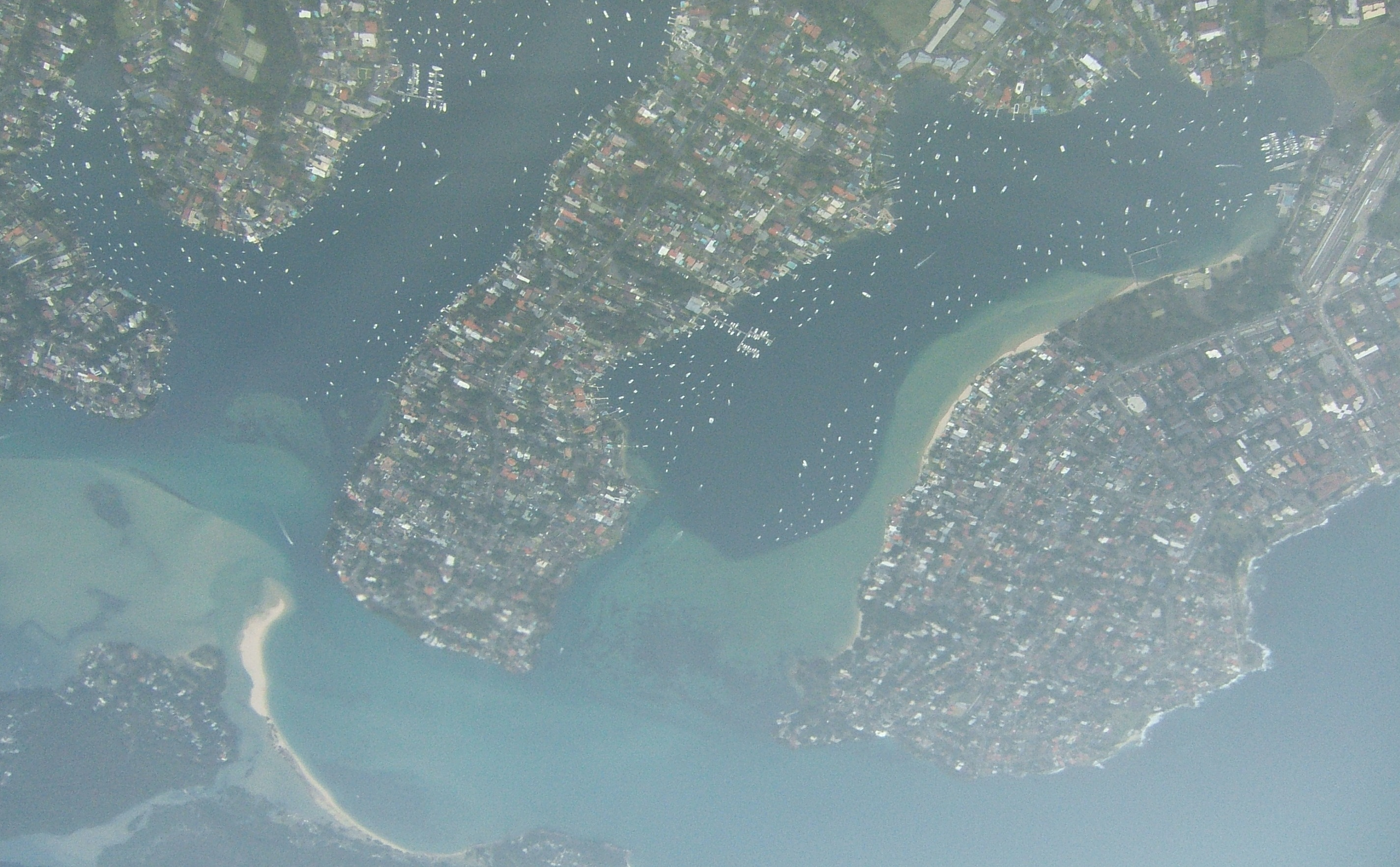
Aerial view of Port Hacking, Dolans Bay, Burraneer and Cronulla

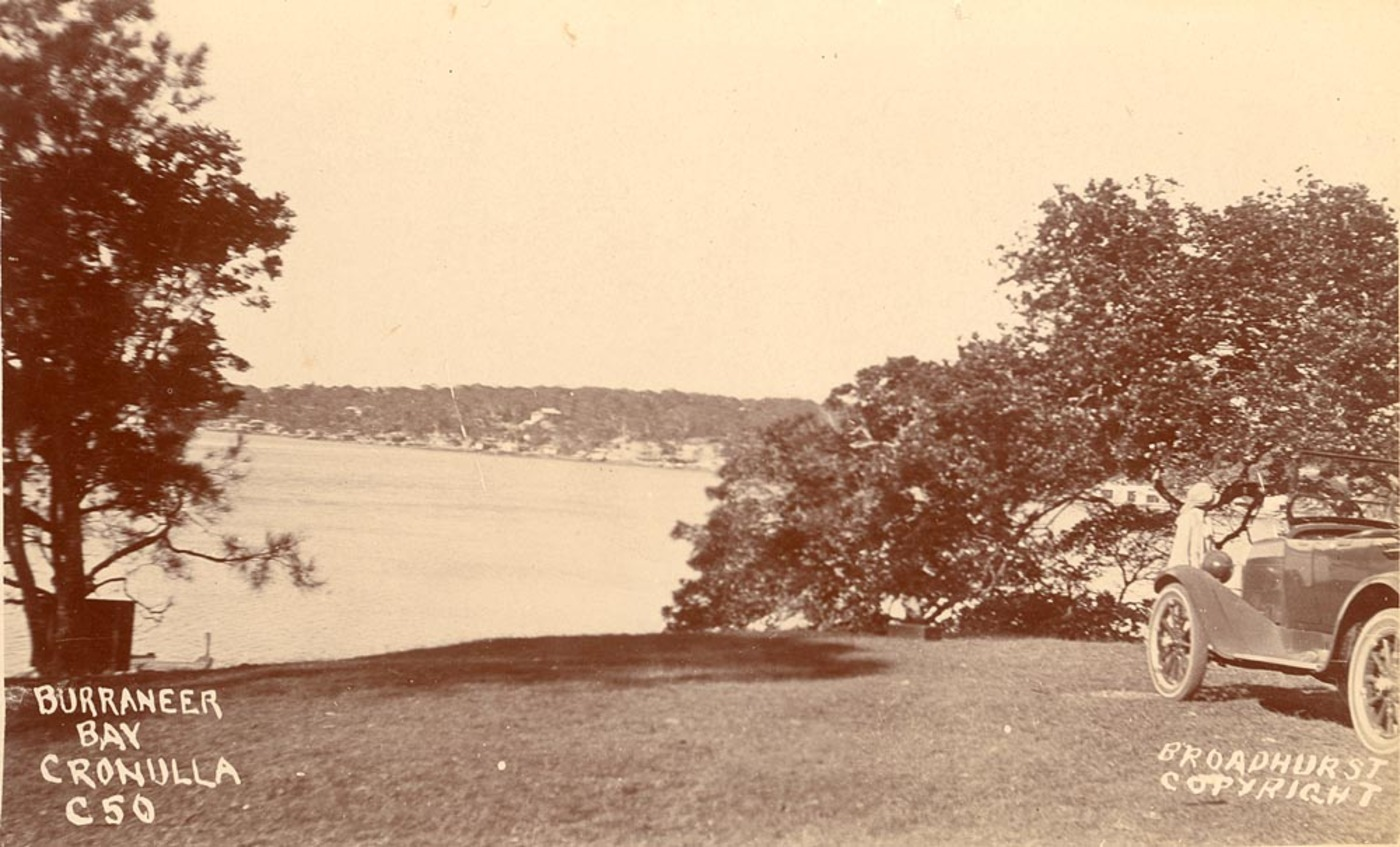
Burraneer Bay, Cronulla

== See also ==
- 2005 Cronulla riots
- Arts Theatre Cronulla
- Cronulla railway station
- Cronulla sand dunes
- Electoral district of Cronulla, a seat in the New South Wales Legislative Assembly
