= Shark Island (Cronulla Beach) =

Island in Sydney, New South Wales, Australia

Coordinates: 34.05968°S 151.15944°E

Shark Island is a dangerous reef break about 100 metres off the coast of Cronulla, in Sydney New South Wales, Australia. It comprises a rock ledge that is fully exposed at low tide.

The island is a well-known bodyboarding and surfing location. The wave can stand up fast and violently ("jack up" in surfing jargon), making it difficult and dangerous. The island is regarded by bodyboarders as producing one of the "heaviest" waves in the world.

The annual Shark Island Challenge bodyboarding contest is held there, as well as the annual Shark Island Swim Challenge held at Cronulla Beach.
