= Cronulla Fisheries Centre =

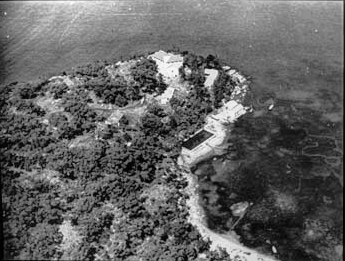
- The Cronulla Fisheries Research Centre in 1923

- Location within Sydney Location within Australia
- 34°04′22″S 151°08′56″E
- Location: 202 Nicholson Parade, Cronulla, Sydney, New South Wales, Australia

History
- Built: 1904–

Site notes
- Owner: NSW Department of Primary Industries

New South Wales Heritage Register
- Official name: Cronulla Fisheries Centre, The; Cronulla Fisheries Research Centre; Hungry Point Reserve; NSW Fisheries Research Institute; CSIR Fisheries Division; CSIRO Division of Fisheries & Oceanography
- Type: State heritage (complex / group)
- Designated: 2 April 1999
- Reference no.: 1011
- Type: Other – Scientific Facilities
- Category: Scientific Facilities

The Cronulla Fisheries Centre or Cronulla Fisheries Research Centre is a heritage-listed former fisheries research centre and now public reserve and marine rescue base located at the Southern end of Nicholson Parade, Cronulla, New South Wales, a suburb of Sydney Australia. It was built from 1904. It is also known as The Cronulla Fisheries Centre and Hungry Point Reserve; NSW Fisheries Research Institute; CSIRO Fisheries Division and the CSIRO Division of Fisheries & Oceanography. The property is owned by the NSW Department of Primary Industries, a department of the Government of New South Wales. The site has heritage listed buildings and several Australian Aboriginal sites. It was added to the New South Wales State Heritage Register on 2 April 1999.

Following a long history of internationally recognised research, in 2011 a decision was made by the Government of New South Wales to decentralise the Centre's functions and staff to regional centres at Coffs Harbour, Port Stephens and Nowra. The decision created a degree of controversy as it was announced without any staff consultation, or a cost-benefit analysis. A Parliamentary Inquiry was held during 2012, and its chairman, Fred Nile MLC, reported that:

"... [there was] an overwhelming case to retain the scientific staff, facilities and support personnel at the Centre ....".

In December 2012 the Government rejected the inquiry's recommendation, and in 2013 the Centre was closed. In 2014 the Government committed itself to keeping the site in public ownership. The Hungry Point Reserve Trust was created to manage the Crown land, and existing facilities are used by Marine Rescue NSW, the Water Police and Transport for NSW.

== Location ==
The former fisheries centre, and now Hungry Point Reserve, occupies an area of 3-hectares located at 202 Nicholson Parade at the southernmost tip of Cronulla Peninsula overlooking Salmon Haul Bay and Gunnamatta Bay on Port Hacking. It is also opposite Bundeena in the Royal National Park. It is bound on the north by Darook Park, residential properties fronting Nicholson Parade and Cowra Place, and Salmon Haul Reserve on the north east of the site.

== History ==
=== Indigenous history ===
The Gwiyaga (Gweagal), a clan of the Dharawal tribe of indigenous Australians, are traditional custodians of the southern areas of Sydney. The Gweagal hunted and fished in the swamps between Botany Bay and Port Hacking. They spoke the Dharawal language. Radiocarbon dating indicates that Aborigines were using areas of the Royal National Park at least 7,500 years ago. Midden deposits are present along the entire foreshore with minor concentrations associated with rock shelters and extensive midden deposits visible beneath building foundations.

The area would have provided rich marine resources for inhabitants, in terms of both food resources and shelter. Shellfish and fish such as Sydney rock whelk and Sydney rock oyster were integral to the diet of coastal Aboriginal tribes, as were snapper and bream. Both men and women spent considerable time fishing. The diet of Dharawal people could also have included rhizomes of bracken fern, seeds of the wattle, fruit of the geebung (snotty gobbles) and the terminal buds of the cabbage tree palm.

Frank Cridland in his book The Story of Port Hacking, Cronulla and the Sutherland Shire (1924) spoke of Darook Park, and particularly the Wahgunyah Cliffs, immediately north of the Fisheries site, lamenting that the evidence of occupation of the area by the Aboriginal people was in danger of destruction by modern development. He commissioned surveyor and recorder of engraving sites, W.D.Campbell, to record the engravings visible (at the time) in the Cronulla area, including the vicinity of the Fisheries site.

In the early 1960s archaeologist Ian Sim recorded engravings in the Darook Park area, along Darook Park Road (adjacent to the Wahgunyah Cliffs). Some of these engravings may still exist, but are now on private property.

=== Colonial history ===
The earliest description of the area from a European perspective was given by explorer Matthew Flinders, who in April 1814 spent time navigating the shores of Port Hacking. Explorers George Bass and Matthew Flinders camped adjacent to the "Fisheries Site" at (presumably) Salmon Haul Bay in 1776. They liaised with two of the local native people, a very early example of friendly relations between Europeans and members of the local native population.

Surveyor Robert Dixon worked here in 1827-8, naming the beaches. At the south end of Bate Bay and north of the entrance to Port Hacking, John Connell was the first European settler, receiving a 380-acre grant in 1835. The suburb's name is from the Aboriginal word "kurranulla" meaning the place of pink seashells. In 1840 the beach was known as Kurranulla. In 1895 the area was subdivided and land offered for sale at 10 pounds per acre; in 1899 the NSW Government named the area Gunnamatta (meaning sandy hills) but on 26/2/1908 it was officially changed to Cronulla, and Gunnamatta became the name of the beautiful bay on the Port Hacking side of this suburb.

After the railway came to Sutherland in 1884, the area became popular for picnics - for which Cronulla has two assets: a fine ocean surfing beach, and on its southern side beautiful Gunnamatta Bay, an arm of Port Hacking. Before Cronulla was linked to Sydney by rail in 1939, it was necessary to travel to Sutherland and transfer to a steam tram which chuffed its way through sandy, sometimes bushland areas to the beach. An official post office opened in 1891, known as Cronulla Beach post office as at the time most of the settlement was on the beach side. It closed in 1893, reopened in 1907 and in 1929 its name changed officially to Cronulla. The first public school opened in 1910. Today there are two public schools and a high school, as well as convent schools.

=== Development of the Fisheries Research Centre ===
==== Hungry Point area and the evolution of the Cronulla Fisheries Research Centre (CFRC) ====
Scientific fisheries research has been carried out at the Cronulla location for more than 110 years. The research aquaria was built in 1904 and is now heritage listed. It was the first such research facility in the southern hemisphere, and according to fisheries scientist Professor Tony Pitcher of the University of British Columbia, has a "long and distinguished international reputation in fisheries research". The southernmost part of the Cronulla peninsula has a "rich fabric of Aboriginal occupation". Surveyor Robert Dixon visited Cronulla and surrounding areas in 1827, and secured the native names of the beaches and bays, e.g. Cronulla (Kurranulla), Burraneer, Woolooware and Gunnamatta. On 24 December 1861 a Government Reserve of 121 hectares (300 acres) was notified. In 1865 the NSW Fisheries Act was passed. The first research at that location was carried out by Harald Kristian Dannevig (1871–1914), Superintendent of fisheries investigations and fish hatcheries, who later became Commonwealth Director of Fisheries. He was assisted by David George Stead (1877–1957).

In the late 1800s and early 1900s the NSW Government was concerned at serious depletion of fish stocks in estuaries as a result of illegal overfishing and gross chemical pollution of Sydney harbour emanating from measures to combat the rat plague. The plan of the Fisheries Commissioners at the time was to employ aquaculture to supplement stocks of local species and also to improve the quality of the seafood available by importing live fish from the northern hemisphere for culture and release into local waters.

In 1881 the NSW Commissioners of Fisheries were appointed under the Fisheries Act 1881. In 1895 Hungry Point was reserved for defence purposes.

The Hungry Point site now occupied by the CFRC was held as a reserve for defence purposes from 1895 until 1902, when an area of 1.37 ha on the Gunnamatta Bay side of the site was transferred from the Commonwealth for use by the NSW Government for the purpose of fish culture. The NSW Government was determined to appoint a fisheries expert of world repute, and in 1902 selected a 31 year old Norwegian, Harald Dannevig, who had constructed the Dunbar and Aberdeen Marine Fish Hatcheries, and supervised their operation for 9 years. He had extensive knowledge of the commercial fishing industry in the North Sea, based on early training with his father, Gunder Dannevig, regarded as a world leader in fisheries stocking. In 1902 Harald Dannevig began duties in Sydney in the newly created position of Superintendent of Fisheries Investigations and Marine Hatcheries. He transported adult fish from the UK to Sydney, to supplement stocks in depleted NSW estuaries. He carefully selected the Cronulla site for the new hatchery and supervised construction and operation. All aspects of a potential fishing industry, both fresh and marine water, were investigated and extensive plans formulated by Dannevig. His plans were always based on expert practical work in the field and extensive discussions with fishers. He was called on by Government Commissions looking into fishing and food industries as well as giving advice to other Australian states.

The Cronulla hatchery, experimental pool and laboratory were built in 1904, commissioned in 1905 and became fully operational in early 1906. Initial stocks of the hatchery included whiting, red bream, flathead, trevally and crayfish. Later snapper and other finfish were introduced. These all flourished in the pond but did not spawn. Dannevig had more success with flounder from Tasmania, resulting in the liberation of 20 million young fish into Port Hacking, Botany Bay, Middle Harbour and Brisbane Water. The hatchering continued to culture finfish and shellfish species but more emphasis was placed on investigations into the biology of local species by hatchery staff and staff from Sydney University. The hatchery was closed in 1914, and the NSW Government embarked on other fisheries related projects including developing a commercial ocean trawl fishery.

The Commonwealth Government appointed Dannevig to the position of founding Director of Fisheries for Australia in 1908. He designed and supervised construction of Australia's first marine research vessel, and went on to conduct the first investigations of fish resources off Australia until his death (aged 43), when the Commonwealth research ship FIV Endeavour was lost in extreme gale conditions off Macquarie Island in 1914. With the vast disruption of World War I, the absence of Dannevig's leadership and insight, fisheries research and development did not progress in Australia until creation of the Council for Scientific and Industrial Research (CSIR, later CSIRO) in 1926. The CSIR's brief included initiation and conduct of research in connection with promotion of primary and secondary industries, training research workers, making grants for pure research and supervision of testing of scientific apparatus and standardisation. In 1929 the saltwater pool was used for experiments on the effect of electrical fields on sharks by Swedish engineer Dr E.O.Moller.

In 1937 Dr Harold Thompson was appointed as the first Officer in Charge of the Fisheries Investigations Section of CSIR, which was renamed the CSIRO Division of Fisheries and Oceanography in 1956. The NSW Government's part holding of the Hungry Point site was transferred back to the Commonwealth in 1938 to accommodate the newly established CSIR Fisheries Division, and provision was made to also house the NSW Fish Biology Branch and students from Sydney University. Programmes were quickly developed in a wide range of research areas, initially related to tuna, whales and dolphins, coastal and estuarine hydrology, fish preservation, mullet and oysters. Subsequent decades saw the rapid expansion of research programmes in physical and chemical oceanography, fish biology, population dynamics and plankton research. The CSIRO Fisheries main building (Building 1) was completed in 1938.

==== Cronulla Migrant Hostel (1949–1967) ====
In 1949 a migrant hostel was built on the eastern half of the site to accommodate post-war migrants from Eastern Europe, many of whom were "Displaced Persons".

The new buildings were added to existing ex-naval huts built in the 1940s and used for the CSIR Fisheries School between 1946–1947. Altogether the Cronulla Migrant Hostel precinct included eighteen buildings. The buildings were constructed of weatherboard and built on brick piers. The gabled roofs were made of corrugated sheet metal, which also clad the narrow verandahs.

The Government Gazette of 22 April 1949 announced acceptance of tenders for construction of accommodation for 200 migrants. Construction continued into 1950 when a carpenters strike threatened to delay completion of the hostel. The dispute was due to the communist-controlled Building Workers' Industrial Union opposing the immigration of refugees from communist-occupied Baltic countries. The hostel was sometimes called "Balt Camp" after the number of Baltic families housed there, though migrants came from other Eastern European countries.

The hostel temporarily closed in 1964 but was reopened in early 1966 to accommodate 102 migrants, mainly of British nationality.

In 1967 the Cronulla Migrant Hostel was closed. All but two of the hostels and associated buildings were demolished in the 1970. These two weatherboard buildings, located within a precinct with views over Port Hacking, have high heritage significance, being "rare examples of Postwar Migrant Hostel accommodation" and "the remaining site layout, buildings and landscape elements provide rare physical evidence of the first phase of the migration experience, accommodation in camps and the compulsory work obligation for men".

==== Research ====
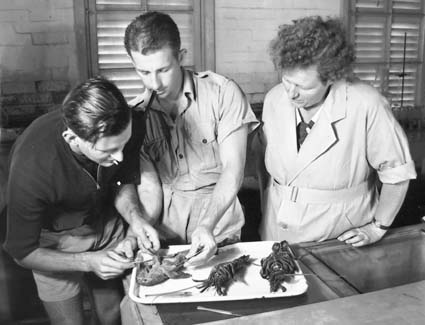
Examining a fish and crustaceans at the Cronulla Fisheries Research Centre, 1947

Until 2012 projects conducted at the Centre included research into bull sharks, Barotrauma, giant cuttlefish, prawns, recreational fishing, commercial fisheries, fish biology, the effects of climate change in NSW, threats to marine biodiversity in NSW, resource assessment and monitoring, and research surveys in estuaries.

==== Services ====
Key services formerly provided by the Centre centred on wild fisheries research and fisheries management. The Centre was also involved in various community services:

- NSW Shark Meshing (Beach Protection) Program
- Shark Aerial Surveys
- 'Get Hooked' – Primary School Education Program
- Fishcare volunteer program

In 1976 the CSIRO Building 16 fisheries laboratories and offices were completed. The CSIRO Marine Laboratories were transferred to Hobart in 1984 after 47 years of research at the Hungry Point site. These decades of research were of enormous importance in establishing the basis for oceanographic and fisheries research in Australia.

The facilities at Cronulla were transferred back to the NSW Government in 1985 for the purposes of fisheries research, and research staff of the Fisheries Division of NSW Department of Agriculture moved to the site in July 1985, when the facility was renamed the NSW Fisheries Research Institute. Research carried out since then included investigations into the dynamics of trawl fish, estuarine fish and invertebrate populations. There have been research projects to investigate the effects of impounding waterways, the impact of the Deep-Water Ocean Outfalls, the ecological impact of the third runway at Sydney Airport, the effects of fishing over seagrass and estimation of the level of catch in recreational fisheries.

The Commonwealth government retained land title for the eastern part of 1.54 hectares (3.8 acres) of the Cronulla Fisheries Research Centre site until 1988, following an agreement in 1984 between the Federal and State Governments. In 2004 NSW Fisheries was amalgamated with other departments to form the NSW Department of Primary Industries (DPI). In 2005 the centenary of aquatic research at the Cronulla Marine Laboratories was celebrated. In February 2007 a newly upgraded laboratory was opened by Ian Macdonald the NSW Minister for Primary Industries. The new $1 million laboratory was named the 'H.C. Dannevig Fisheries Laboratory' after Dannevig, the founder of the Cronulla Fisheries Research Centre. The centre operated as a Fisheries Centre of Excellence until its closure in 2011.

Prior to its closure, as at March 2011 the 25-hectare (62-acre) Centre had 152 staff which included 18 research and eleven management professional staff. The Centre supported 22 postgraduate students, two overseas projects and two consultancies. The Centre had conducted 56 workshops/meetings, 182 field days, and 51 publications.

An inquiry into the closure of the Cronulla Fisheries Research Centre of Excellence was instigated and a committee established by a NSW Legislative Council resolution, to report by 23 October 2012. The committee's resolutions included that the NSW Government reverse the decision to close the CFRC and not proceed with the closure. The NSW government responded in December 2012, stating it did not support their recommendation to reverse the decision to close the centre. The NSW Department of Primary Industries Director-General issued terms of reference to recommend future uses of the site. In November David Harley AM prepared a report, making 25 recommendations for the future use of the site. One was that a Management Trust be established to manage the site.

=== Parliamentary inquiry ===
An inquiry by the 'Legislative Council Select Committee on Cronulla Fisheries' into the closure was established on 21 June 2012. Submissions were called for on 25 June 2012, closing on 30 July 2012. The final report was delivered on time on 23 October 2012. The committee was chaired by Fred Nile. Marie Ficarra was the deputy chair and committee members were Niall Blair, David Clarke, Cate Faehrmann, Mick Veitch and Steve Whan.

Public hearings were held on 6 August 2012, 3 September 2012 and 10 September 2012. A public forum was also held on 3 September 2012. One hundred and seven submissions were published by the Committee. Twenty one witnesses were heard. These included Katrina Hodgkinson, the New South Wales Minister for Primary Industries, responsible for the closure. During her evidence to the Committee, the Minister "stipulated that the closure of the CFRC was fait accompli and would not be reconsidered, whatever the Committee found or recommended". The Minister tabled a cost-benefit analysis, completed hours before the hearing, but twelve months after the decision to close the facility and relocate the staff was made public. She also said "Decentralisation would save A$4.4 million over 20 years".

==== Terms of references ====
The main terms of reference of the committee were:

That a select committee be appointed to inquire into and report on the closure of the Cronulla Fisheries Research Centre of Excellence, and in particular:

- The basis for the decision including the documents and other records that were considered by the Minister, including any economic or financial analysis,
- What consultation was undertaken prior to the decision with stakeholders, including commercial and recreational fishing groups, environmental groups and staff,
- The costs and benefits of the decision to close the Centre and relocate its functions to other locations,
- The extent to which the decision satisfies the Minister's responsibilities under the Fisheries Management Act 1994,
- Any advice received by the Minister on the ability to replicate the Cronulla facilities at other locations, including potential problems and other implications of the other locations,
- The loss of the scientific expertise held by the staff who cannot relocate from Cronulla and the implications for sustainable fisheries management,
- The impacts of the decision on service delivery to stakeholders,
- The impact on staff and their families of the closure and the relocation, and
- The impact on the heritage values of the Cronulla Fisheries Research Centre.

==== 2012 Parliamentary speeches touching on the site's history ====
The CFRC is an important part of Australian history. It should be held in the same reverence as the Elizabeth MacArthur Agricultural Institute, as the starting point for the Agriculture Industry in Australia. Under various names, the now Cronulla Fisheries Research Centre was the site from which fisheries resources of Australia were explored and the fishing industry developed. It was the first fisheries research centre in Australia and probably the southern hemisphere. Its buildings date back to 1902, these being purpose built at the time for fisheries research.

Since that time the site has housed fisheries scientists from either NSW or Commonwealth government agencies. It was the base for the first chief scientist of fisheries in Australia, Harald Dannevig. From this base he surveyed the fish resources of eastern Australia to as far south as Macquarie Island and westwards in to Bass Strait as far as Western Australia. It has housed fisheries scientists and oceanographers, including the first oceanographic scientists in Australia, the Chair of the International Whaling Commission and scientists who advised that body, who discovered deepwater resources and surveyed the prawn resources of the Gulf of Carpentaria.

In addition, the site has indigenous cultural significance. CFRC is strewn with indigenous middens three of which are recognised under the Heritage Act as being worthy of conservation and protection. As part of the high school education program at the CFRC indigenous leaders take great pride in talking to students about how their people lived on this land and the importance of this land to them.

The site has associations with a number of notable scientists including Harald Dannevig (as noted above), Dr Geoffrey Kesteven, John McIntosh, David Tranter, Baughan Wisely, David Rochford and Ian Munro. Through these scientists working together they produced the earliest science for Australia as well as New South Wales in fisheries knowledge.

Dr Keith Sainsbury, another important gentleman was at Cronulla until CSIRO moved to Hobart. He is one of only two Australians to have been created a laureate and receive the Japan Prize, the highest prize in science. He still works internationally, nationally and in New South Wales as an expert in fisheries management and most notably he helps in the annual assessment process for determining the New South Wales take of the highly prized abalone and lobster fisheries.

The Commonwealth Scientific and Industrial Research Organisation had utilised the site from 1949 until it transferred to Hobart in 1985. At that time, the Department of Agriculture's Division of Fisheries returned to the Cronulla site. 'The Cronulla Fisheries Research Centre is unique in Australia, and the site was handed over from the Commonwealth to the NSW Government in 1984 in good faith that the site and buildings would continue to be used for marine research purposes.

Former hatchery building

Fish hatchery was established in c. 1904. Building constructed prior to 1914, probably c. 1904–1907. It was originally a laboratory wing (with open verandah on both sides) and a hatchery hall comprising a single open space containing fish tanks. It was thought to be vacant c. 1920–1930. The Commonwealth Scientific & Industrial Research (later... Organisation) CSIR/CSIRO operations post-1938 were in this building. The hall remained open until 1950.

Boat shed

Constructed between 1904 and 1914. Re-clad c. 1970s. Restoration work to cladding and windows replaced in 2002. Originally had wharf at western side. Engine room at east probably re-clad but original structure. Used to house boats and marine equipment.

Fish pond

Constructed as part of the hatchery complex between 1904 and 1914. Complex established by (Commonwealth) Superintendent of Fisheries, Harald Dannevig.

==== Report ====
The final report, "Closure of the Cronulla Fisheries Research Centre of Excellence", was tabled as scheduled on 23 October 2012.

==== Findings and recommendations ====
The Chairman of the 'Select Committee on the Closure of the Cronulla Fisheries Research Centre of Excellence', Fred Nile, said:

"The Committee has concluded that there is an overwhelming case to retain the scientific staff, facilities and support personnel at the Centre and we have recommended that the Government reverse its decision. "

"Overall we have concluded that the closure of the Cronulla Fisheries Research Centre of Excellence has been an example of how not to undertake decentralisation. The Government's failure to conduct any kind of economic appraisal before deciding to close the Centre is unacceptable. "

"The Committee was disappointed that the decision had been made with no stakeholder consultation, in particular, the Government did not consult then Chief Scientist of the Department of Primary Industries, and Director of the Centre, Professor Steve Kennelly. "

The Committees report made 13 recommendations, the first of which is:

"That the NSW Government reverse the decision to close the Cronulla Fisheries Research Centre of Excellence and not proceed with the closure.

"The Committee is working on the expectation that the NSW Government will accept Recommendation 1 based on the evidence of this report. In the event that the Government does not accept Recommendation 1, the Committee believes that the Government should consider the following recommendations. "

The report then details a further 12 recommendations.

Josephine Tovey in The Sydney Morning Herald reported that: "The inquiry, ... found the decision to close the centre and decentralise its activities to several coastal towns was made without any economic analysis, in conflict with the Government's own policies, and was never presented to cabinet. "

==== Government response and outcomes ====
In September/October 2011, the O'Farrell Government announced closure of the centre and regional disbursement of the positions. Staff mounted an industrial and community campaign, including a website.

Minister for Primary Industries, Katrina Hodgkinson, together with Minister Andrew Stoner, the Deputy Premier, announced on 8 September 2011 that the Cronulla Fisheries Research Centre of Excellence at Hungry Point, known as the Cronulla Fisheries site, was to be closed and its roles and functions were to be decentralised to regional coastal locations. Associate Professor David Harley AM was appointed by the Department of Primary Industries director general to assess the future usages of the site under specific terms of reference.

The Select Committee Inquiry into the Cronulla Fisheries Research Centre closure was published on 23 October 2012. On 22 November 2012, employees were advised that all further decommissioning of the site at Cronulla would be placed on hold until such time the Government responds to the recommendations made by the Committee's report and that no individual would be forced to make a decision, including to transfer or exit. However, where a staff member has already agreed to relocate, the Government has a duty of care to support them in their move at this time, and is therefore unable to simply cease offering this support. Similarly, the Government remains committed to a Decade of Decentralisation and recruitment for positions in regional locations needs to continue irrespective of the Government's response to the Committee's report. The Deputy Premier and Minister for Primary Industries announced the Government response on 14 December 2012. On 23 October 2012, the committee required the government to provide a response by 23 April 2014. Fred Nile claimed success at a rally to save the Fisheries Centre when the closure was "put on hold" on 21 November 2012. The NSW Government agreed to temporarily halt the closure until it could respond to the committees report, but in December 2012 the Government rejected the main recommendation of the parliamentary inquiry and pressed ahead with closing the Centre.

Stoner and Hodgkinson gave a commitment that the site would remain in public ownership, with increased access to the public. On 4 April 2013 the Hungry Point Reserve Trust Board appointments were announced, to manage the area of the former Cronulla Fisheries Research Centre. The Trust manages the Crown Reserve land, the volunteer Marine Rescue NSW partly occupied the site (buildings 1, 3, 5, 9 and 22) by license, NSW Water Police and Roads & Maritime Services took up other existing facilities on site.

== Description ==
The Cronulla Fisheries Research Centre of Excellence (CFRC) is a purpose built research facility on approximately three hectares on a headland in the Sydney suburb of Cronulla.1 It was the first fisheries research centre in Australia having been identified for the purpose by Harald Dannevig in 1895.2 The site as a whole is heritage listed, as are several individual aspects, these include the former hatchery building, the boat shed and the aquaria.3 There are three Aboriginal middens on the site that are also heritage listed. The CFRC site is wholly owned by the NSW Government.

=== Elements of the site include ===
Former hatchery building

An L-shaped brick building with two wings, located on a flat (benched) area slightly above a boat shed and fish ponds at the western side of Hungry Point. Web-fired single skin brickwork walls with original single back piers and additional recent brick piers and buttresses to southern wing. New colourbond corrugated iron roof. Interior of northern wing adapted for office use; southern verandah of other wing infilled. Original features include door and window joinery.

Boat shed

Weatherboard wall, new colourbond corrugated iron gable roof. Located on eroded sea wall at edge of Port Hacking on western side of Hungry Point. Recent roller door on east side. Doors at west provide evidence of location of former wharf.

Fish pond

Concrete pool measuring 30 by 12 by 2 metres (98.4 ft × 39.4 ft × 6.6 ft), featuring more recent concrete sea wall, mesh sunshades and filter units.

Aboriginal middens

1. Rockshelter with midden deposits which extend downslope for a distance of at least five metres below the shelter.
2. Small area of midden down near holding pens on western side of complex.
3. Large area of midden along the southeastern edge of the flat area at the top of the complex between building 15 and the fuel store beyond.

The area would have provided rich marine resources for Aboriginal inhabitants, in terms of both food resources and shelter. Shellfish and fish such as Sydney rock whelk and Sydney rock oyster were integral to the diet of coastal tribes, as were snapper and bream. Both men and women spent considerable time fishing from bark canoes with hooks made from ground Turban shell, and line made from twine from the cabbage tree palm leaf. Shell middens result from Aboriginal exploitation and consumption of shellfish or mammal bone, stone artefacts, hearths, charcoal and occasionally, burials. They are usuaully located on elevated dry ground close to the aquatic environment from which the shellfish was exploited and where fresh water resources were available.

Littoral Rainforest Remnant

A remnant patch of forest survives on the site in Darook Park. This remnant is of a listed endangered ecological community in NSW, Littoral Rainforest overlooking Port Hacking. Port Jackson figs (Ficus rubiginosa) and other tree, shrubs such as endangered species, Prostanthera densa (villous mint bush) and groundcover species make up the community.

=== Condition ===
As at 24 November 2000, Aboriginal middens have archaeological potential, subject to greater need of preservation.

=== Further information ===
Future management of these structures will aim to conserve all the original fabrics to maintain evidence and allow for the interpretation of their past uses. Consideration will be given to removing detracting elements from the exterior of the former hatchery building if structural investigation is permitted and a maintenance schedule, including painting of timber joinery in period colours may be instigated for three original structures.

In September/October 1911, the O'Farrell Government announces closure of the centre and regional disbursement of the positions. Staff mounted an industrial and community campaign.

== Heritage listing ==
As at 31 March 2010, the Cronulla Fisheries Centre site as a whole is of national and state heritage significance because it is the first marine investigation establishment in Australia, commencing in 1904. It has had continual association with NSW and Commonwealth Government Fisheries investigations since then. The complex is associated with the work of the first Director of NSW and Commonwealth fisheries investigations, Harald Dannevig. Three original structures still exist on the site and are considered as a group to have State significance.

Cronulla Fisheries Centre was listed on the New South Wales State Heritage Register on 2 April 1999.

== See also ==
- National Marine Science Centre, Australia
