= Aileen Griffiths =

Australian community worker

Aileen May Griffiths OAM (1918–2007) was an Australian philanthropist who was awarded the Order of Australia in 1996, and the Centenary Medal in 2001, for her community work in the Sutherland Shire of Sydney.

Griffiths was the daughter of William Atkinson and Therese Peters. She went to school at the Leichhardt Public School and then Petersham High School. After her father's death, she moved to her grandparents' property at South Cronulla. She joined the North Cronulla Surf Life Saving Club, formed its first Ladies Committee and organized dances and carnivals during the Second World War. During 1944, she began fund raising to build a hospital at Sutherland. The Sutherland Hospital opened in 1958. Griffiths organized fund raising events for the hospital for the next thirty years, and served on the hospital board. In 1948 she married George Griffiths.

Griffiths was a founding member of the Sutherland Shire Historical Society, and the Woolooware Golf Club.

In 2006, she was made Citizen of the Year by the Sutherland Shire Council to celebrate its 100th year.
