= Cronulla Post Office =

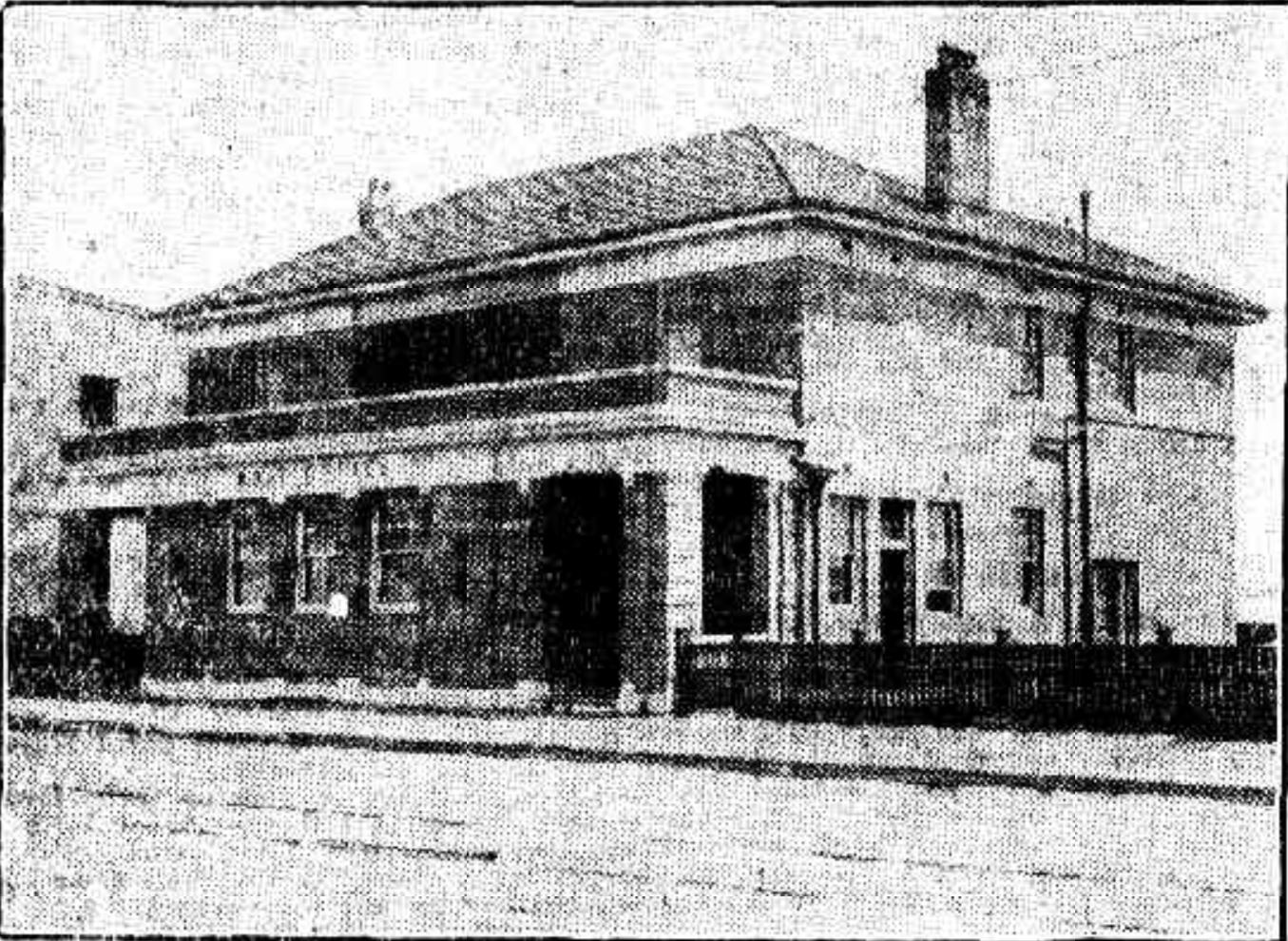
- Cronulla Post Office, 1926

- Location within Sydney
- 34.0529°S 151.1523°E
- Location: 41 Cronulla Street, Cronulla, Sydney, New South Wales, Australia

History
- Built: 1924

Site notes
- Architect: Edwin Hubert Henderson

Commonwealth Heritage List
- Official name: Cronulla Post Office
- Type: Listed place (Historic)
- Designated: 22 August 2012
- Reference no.: 106203

Cronulla Post Office is a heritage-listed post office at 41 Cronulla Street, Cronulla, Sydney, New South Wales, Australia. It was designed by Edwin Hubert Henderson of the Commonwealth Department of Works and Railways and built in 1924. It was added to the Australian Commonwealth Heritage List on 22 August 2012.

== History ==
The local area was known as "Cronulla Beaches" from the early decades of the nineteenth century, but remained largely undeveloped. In the 1860s Thomas Holt acquired a large part of the future shire, and placed tenant farmers on the land. Sutherland Shire was proclaimed in 1906, but by World War I the area remained semi rural in character. The population began to increase after this period, and with a large population increase following World War II, Cronulla became more suburban in character.

The first post office in Cronulla opened in 1891 in the Oriental Hotel with Clara Springall as postmistress. A purpose-built post office was erected in 1900, which was replaced in 1924 by the current substantial Cronulla Post Office. This building, originally comprising a post office, residence and telephone exchange, was designed by architect Edwin Hubert Henderson of the Commonwealth Department of Works and Railways.

== Description ==
Cronulla Post Office is at 41 Cronulla Street, Cronulla, located on part of lots 12 and 13 in DP 5709. Cronulla Street is the main shopping precinct in the original suburban development of Cronulla, with the Cronulla railway station nearby and the main beaches to the immediate east. Cronulla Street has been turned into a mall outside the post office, which sits on a deep allotment. The post office and quarters open onto Cronulla Street at the front, and a back yard area contains timber and metal-clad outbuildings/additions of more recent origin including a former bicycle storage shed. An ablutions block that formerly occupied the rear yard has been removed. The rear yard and the driveway to the south of the post office has been paved in bitumen.

The building comprises a single-storey postal hall to the street frontage with a recessed two-storey wing behind, housing the original quarters upstairs and the mail, sorting and service rooms below. The facade was formed in the well-established Queensland, and then Commonwealth, arrangement of a projecting "solid" breakfront for the public post office area, set between two hollow bay porch components at ground level. The first floor then inverted the pattern with a central columned balcony recessed between two flanking bays with one window to each.

The exterior walling was in a standard Sydney face brick. The postal hall was marked out from its flanking porch components by two rusticated brick piers, a recognisably Commonwealth architectural motif. These piers between the end bays and the centrally placed group of three windows to the ground floor, have narrow windows covered by a saltire cross motif formed as a metal grille across them. The three central windows to the postal hall were framed by four quasi-pilasters, using face brick shafts and stucco-rendered Tuscan capitals. These complement the six timber posts that flank the recessed balcony immediately above and support the entablature. The window-heads and balcony lintel are all surmounted by two moulded stucco friezes running across each storey, with the lower forming a plate for the Post Office label. The windows are all double-hung sashes with multipaned upper lights and tilted brick sills. The upper sash of the end bay at south has had its glazing bars removed to fit an electric exhaust fan.

Both flanking porch bays have been filled in with brick and with a timber framed window matching those on the postal hall front. The porches internally have been incorporated to form part of the retail space. Another door opening, on the ground floor south elevation, has also been infilled. A flagpole is fixed to the wall, adjacent to the former south porch. It was fitted after the building was completed. The original side gates have been replaced with unsympathetic mock-Victorian aluminium gates. The bicycle shed and store in the back yard are of recent origin.

The roof of the first floor is a hipped timber frame. The lower roof is flat and concealed behind a parapet and forms the floor of the upstairs balcony. The roofing here is believed to be asbestos sheeting. The rear (west) roofing was in two hipped trailing wings, the northern wing having an addition on the ground level. A rear balcony on the upper floor, between the trailing wings has been infilled in timber and casement windows. The ground floor interior retains little original fabric, and there is a standard post shop retail fitout with modern shelving units, and a suspended ceiling form. The first floor quarters retains most of its original fabric including two timber fireplaces, doors, architraves and joinery including polished timber stair balusters as well as a large panelled timber cabinet at the top of the stairs. The original planning on the first floor has been altered in places through the partial removal of walls and the insertion of new door openings.

The extension north along Cronulla Street, was added in the 1970s. It housed a post office box lobby, with two open frontages on either side of a brick screen. This screen was surfaced in similar brick to that on the original building, and seemed intended as a link. The screen has since been removed. This addition has boxed eaves that conceal its metal decking roof. The eaves are fronted by a crimped metal-skinned fascia about 1.6 m deep. This lines up with the main cornice above the original postal hall and one of the projecting courses of the 1924 rusticated brick piers. The soffit in this extension is cement sheet or similar and the walls are rendered and face brick.

=== Key areas/elements ===
The key elements of the post office are its:

- Cronulla Street (east) elevation
- Intact interior of the original quarters and timber stair

=== Condition ===
The overall condition of the building is fair, due to the size of and limited compatibility of the extension at the north end, and the infilling of the original porches. The upstairs of the building (quarters) is extremely intact, the remainder of the building, interior and exterior, displays a lower level of intactness.

=== Original fabric ===
The surviving original fabric of the building consists of:

- Structural frame: concrete footings and piers, the latter clad in brick. Steel box framed roof on newer north wing, with metal deck cladding and fascia. Timber roof frame on original building. Windows to the original building are timber framed, and those to the later north wing are aluminium framed.
- External walls: dark fired red face brick in stretcher bond with stucco mouldings, course lines and cornices. The frontal base coursing is cement rendered.
- Internal walls: timber (stud) framed walls with plasterboard cladding. Walls of first floor quarters are fibrous plaster or lath on plaster.
- Floor: timber floor framing in original post office building. Concrete flooring in the north wing.
- Ceiling: suspended ceiling form in retail areas and in the later wing. Lath and plaster or fibrous plaster in upstairs quarters. Other ceilings are plasterboard.
- Roof: timber framed, clad in Marseilles-pattern terracotta tile (original building). Steel box frame, crimped metal decking as cladding and fascia on north wing.

== Heritage listing ==
Cronulla Post Office was listed on the Australian Commonwealth Heritage List on 22 August 2012 having satisfied the following criteria.

Criterion A: Processes

Cronulla Post Office, constructed in 1924 and designed by architect Edwin Hubert Henderson of the Commonwealth Department of Works and Railways, has historical significance deriving from its prominent location within central Cronulla, and its association with the growth in local development in the first half of the twentieth century. The building, originally comprising a post office, residence and telephone exchange, was relatively substantial and clearly intended to meet the needs of the developing area.

Criterion D: Characteristic values

Cronulla Post Office is an example of:

- a post office and telegraph office with quarters (second generation typology 1870–1929)
- an interwar era building in a Georgian Revival style
- the work of EH Henderson, Commonwealth Department of Works and Railways

Typologically, Cronulla Post Office was constructed as a combined post and telegraph office with a residence at first floor level in 1924. The original layout of the postal functions at ground level have been removed and replaced with a standard post shop retail fitout and suspended ceiling form, however, the original layout, joinery and fixtures of the residence on the first floor are largely intact.

The original porches flanking the postal hall have also been infilled and incorporated into the interior of the post office and an addition has been constructed to the north of the original building. These alterations have compromised the typological intactness of the building, albeit the upper level residence interior remains more intact. Architecturally and stylistically, Cronulla Post Office is a suburban post office in the Interwar Georgian revival style, a decade later than earlier post office designs in this style. Compositionally, the original building is marked by broad reversals of solid and void to its Cronulla Street façade in a symmetrical fashion, with the postal hall flanked by porches and a setback balcony to the first floor. The infilling of the flanking porch bays and the 1970s addition to the north of the building have compromised the symmetrical nature of the original building, although it remains a reasonably well crafted and finely detailed post office building.

Criterion E: Aesthetic characteristics

Cronulla Post Office is a good albeit altered example of the Interwar Georgian Revival style. The building demonstrates the strong massing, considered proportions, simple geometric forms and minimal detail typical of this style, all of which enhance its streetscape contribution. The red brick exterior also assists the building in standing out in its streetscape context.
