= Shark Island Swim Challenge =

Swimming event in Sydney, Australia

The Cronulla Shark Island Swim Challenge is an annual event of 2.3 km (1.4 mi), held at Cronulla Beach in Sydney, Australia.

== History ==
The first Cronulla Shark Island Swim Challenge was held in October 1987. There was a medium swell and the water was choppy. There were only sixty-four competitors. The swim was 2.4 km (1.5 mi), from the beach shoreline out around Cronulla Point, around Shark Island and back to the beach. Long-distance swimmer David O'Brien was the inaugural winner.
