= Cronulla Beach =

Beach in Sydney, Australia

- Beach
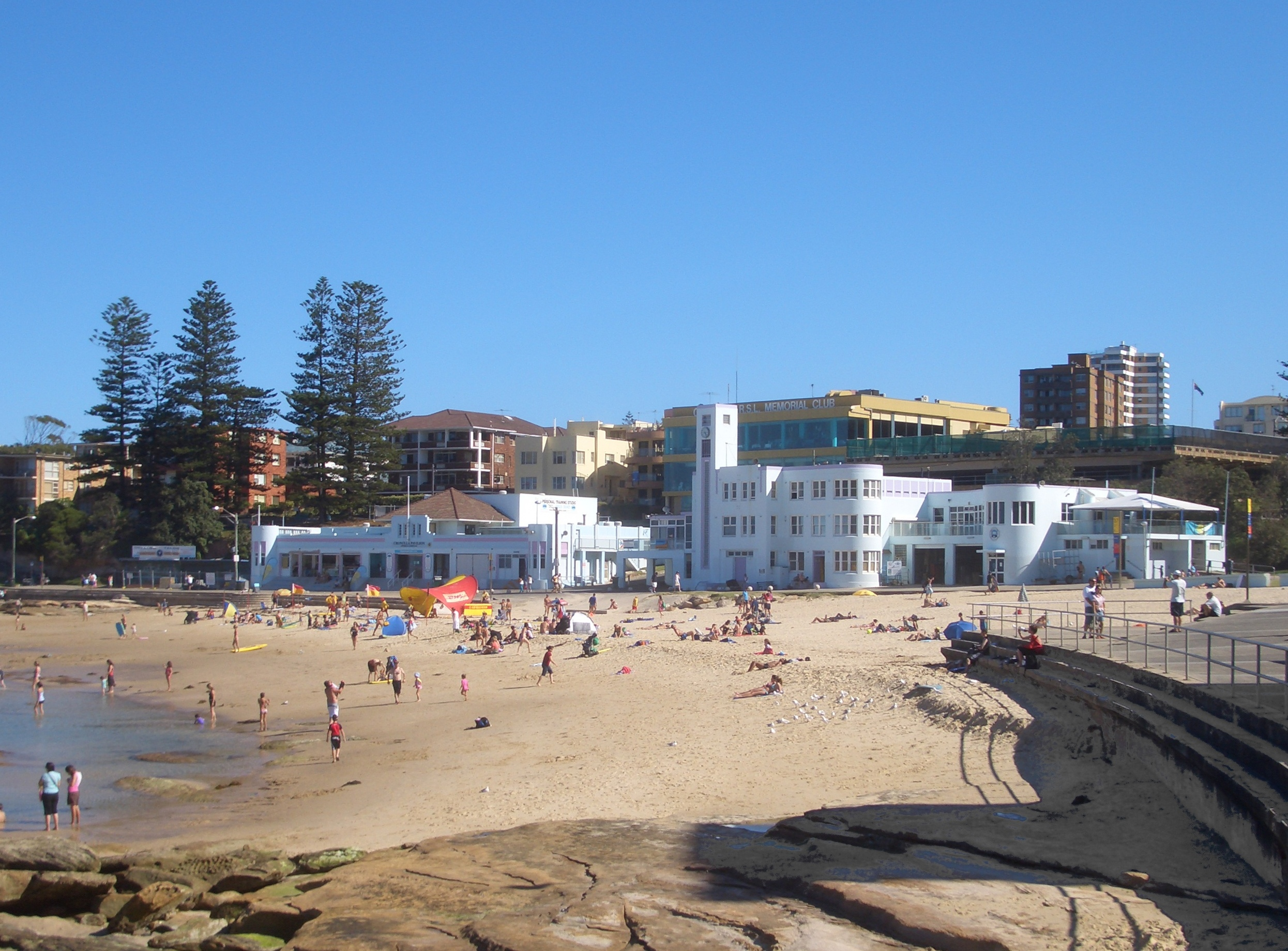
- View of Cronulla Beach, looking south

- Location within New South Wales
- Coordinates: 34°03′20″S 151°09′18″E
- Location: Cronulla, Sydney, New South Wales, Australia

Dimensions
  - Length: 200 m (219 yards)
- Patrolled by: Cronulla Surf Life Saving Club
- Hazard rating: 3/10 (least hazardous)
- Access: Kingsway (road); T4 Cronulla (train)

Cronulla Beach (sometimes referred to as South Cronulla Beach), is a patrolled beach on Bate Bay in the Sydney suburb of Cronulla, New South Wales, Australia. The Cronulla Pavilion and the Cronulla Lifesaving Club are two prominent buildings located close to the sand. Cronulla Park sits behind the beach. The Cronulla Rock Pools are between Cronulla Beach and North Cronulla beach. The Alley is the local name given to the area between Cronulla Beach and North Cronulla Beach. Shark Island is a dangerous reef break, located off Cronulla Beach.

== History ==
Cronulla is derived from an Aboriginal word kurranulla, meaning 'place of pink seashells'.

== Cronulla Surf Life Saving Club ==
The Cronulla Surf Life Saving Club, was one of the first surf clubs established in Australia in 1907. The club started out in a tram carriage and today it is housed in an art deco building on the beachfront, that was built in 1940.

Cronulla is one of the largest and strongest clubs in the surf life saving movement with 1,200 members, including 620 in its nipper ranks. Many lifesavers volunteer their time to patrol the beaches during the season from late September to late April. Cronulla has won three World Championships encompassing all rescue and Surf Life Saving competition and has consistently placed in the top 10 clubs at the Australian championships over the past 20 years.

== Sport and recreation ==
The Australian Boardriders Battle and Shark Island Challenge are held on Cronulla Beach.

== Pop culture ==
Cronulla beach came to international prominence with the novel and film Puberty Blues. Subsequently there Puberty Blues was made into a television serial also produced in the area as was "The Principal".

== Gallery ==
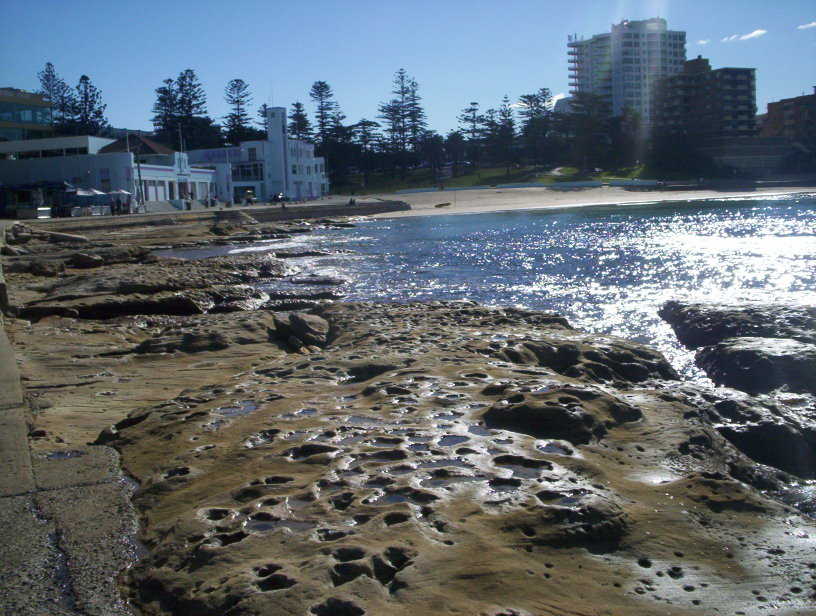
Cronulla Beach

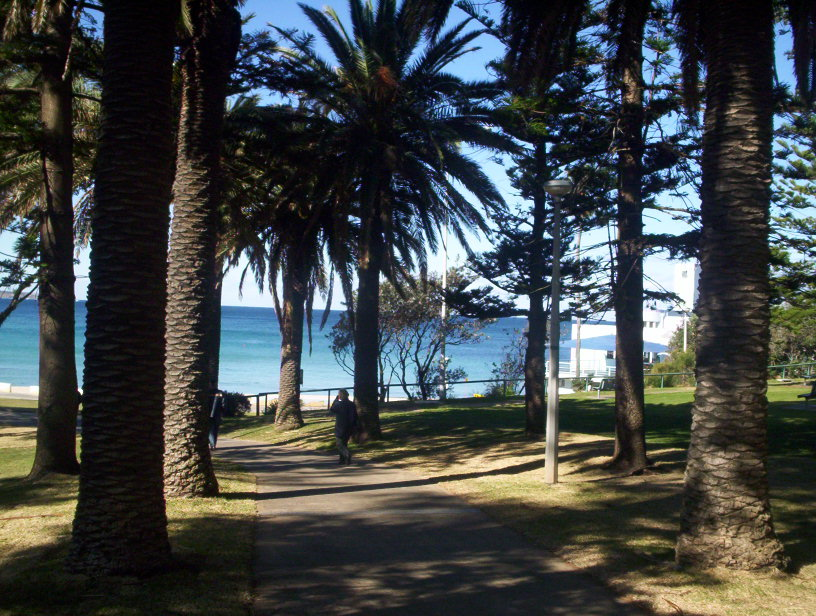
Cronulla Park

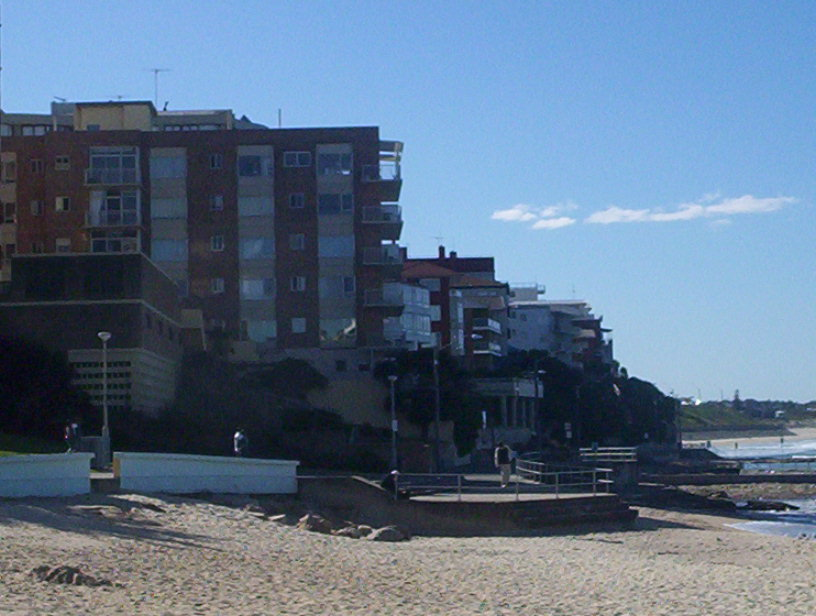
The Alley

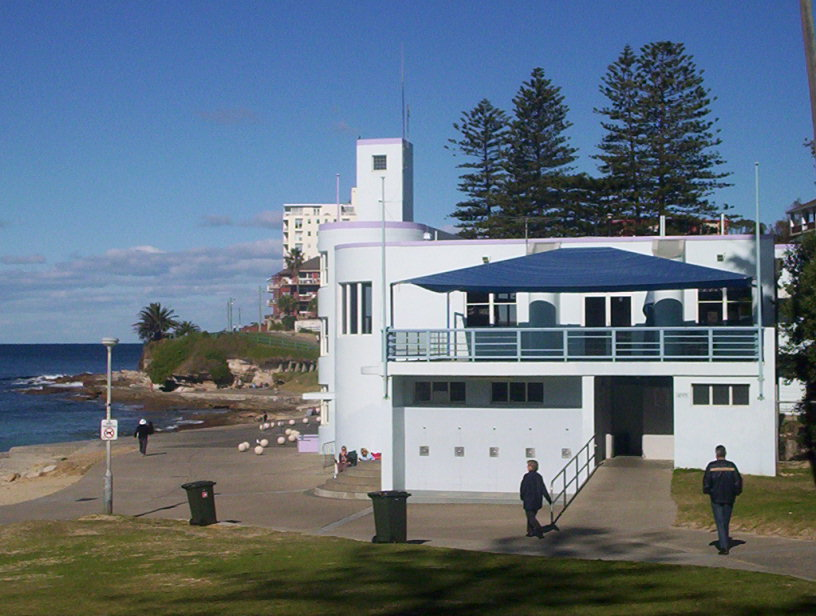
Cronulla lifesaving club

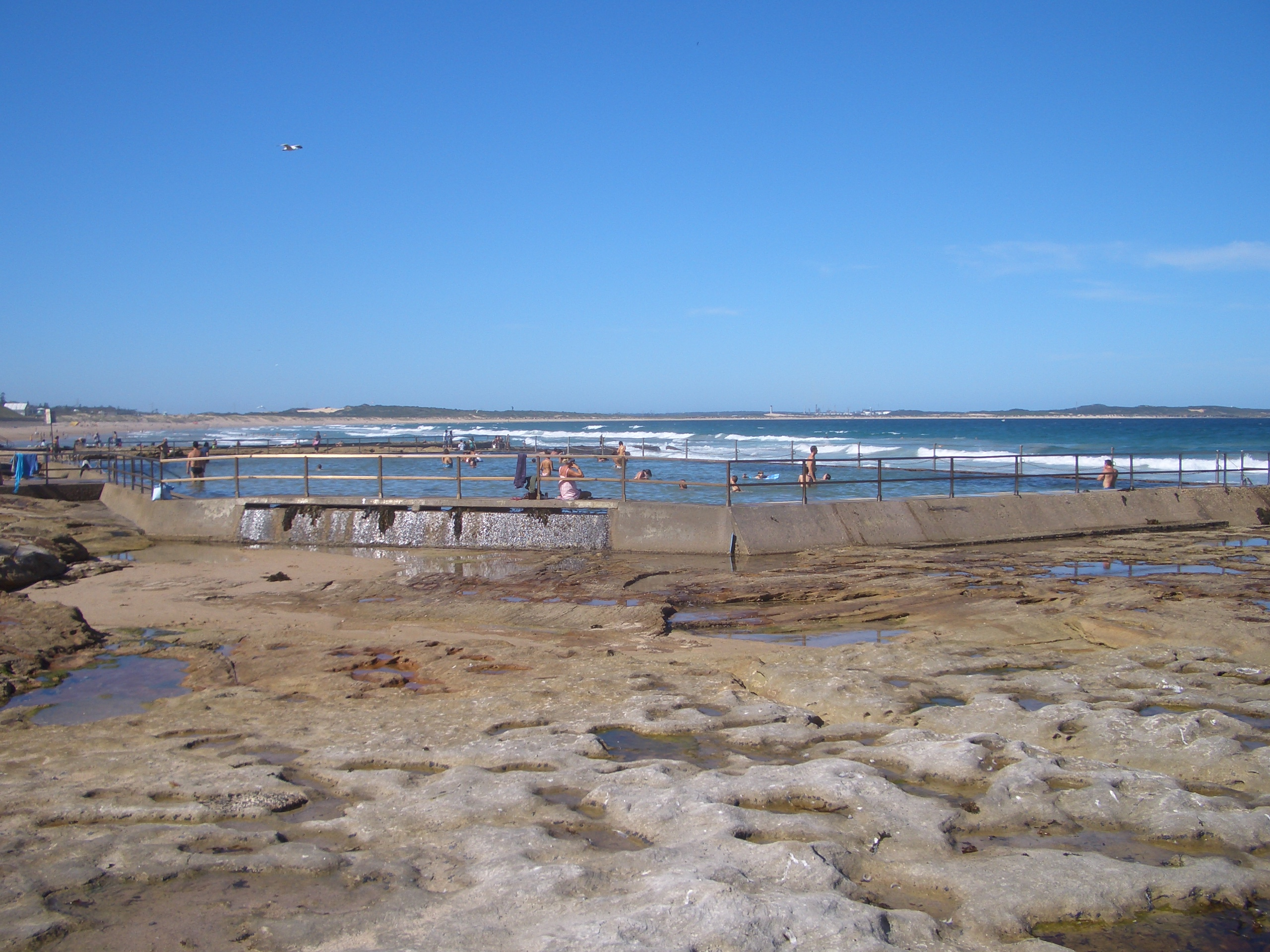
Cronulla Rock Pools

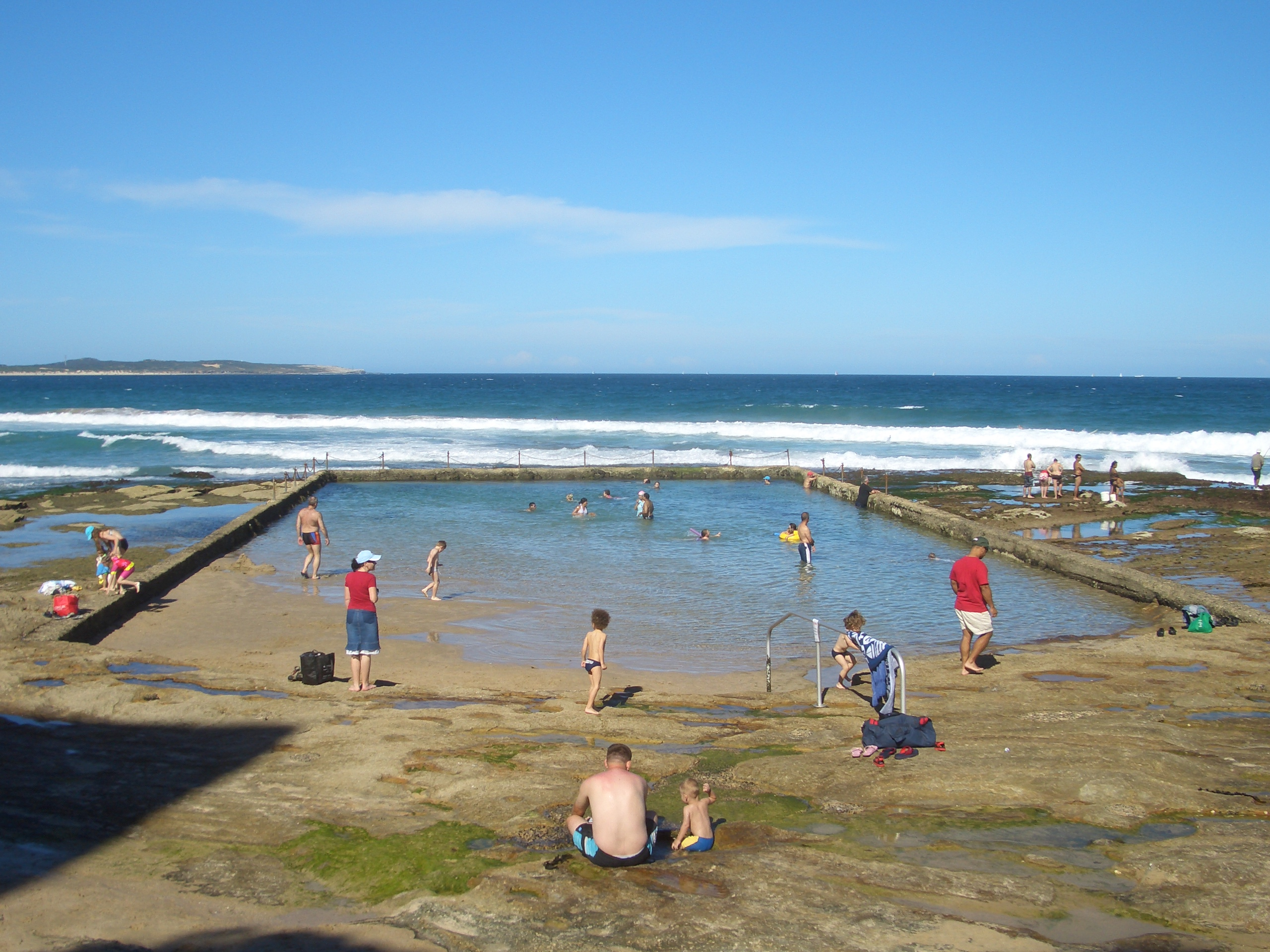
Cronulla Rock Pools

== See also ==
- Beaches in Sydney
- Wanda Sand dunes
- Guide to Sydney Beaches
- "Sand in our Souls - the Beach in Australian History" Leone Huntsman, MUP, 2001
- 2005 Cronulla riots
