= Richardson =

Richardson may refer to:

== People ==
- Richardson (surname), an English and Scottish surname, including a list of people
- Richardson (given name), a list of people
- Richardson (footballer, born 1976), Brazilian footballer Richardson Oliveira dos Santos
- Richardson (footballer, born 1991), Brazilian footballer Richardson Fernandes dos Santos
- Richardson (footballer, born 1992), Brazilian footballer Richardson Jussier Medeiros Cabral

== Places ==
=== Canada ===
- Richardson Islands, Nunavut
- Richardson Mountains, Yukon

=== United States ===
- Cortelyou, Alabama, also known as Richardson, an unincorporated community
- Richardson, Kentucky, an unincorporated community
- Richardson, Texas, a city
- Richardson, West Virginia, an unincorporated community
- Richardson, Wisconsin, an unincorporated community
- Richardson Bay, California
- Richardson Beach, Hawaii, a park
- Richardson County, Nebraska
- Richardson Glacier (Washington)
- Richardson Lake, Minnesota
- Richardson Township, Morrison County, Minnesota
- Richardson Township, Butler County, Nebraska
- Fort Richardson (Alaska), a former United States Army installation
- Fort Richardson (Texas), a former United States Army installation
- Fort Richardson (Arlington, Virginia), a former Union Army redoubt

=== Outer space ===
- Richardson (lunar crater)
- Richardson (Martian crater)

=== Elsewhere ===
- Richardson, Australian Capital Territory, a suburb
- Richardson Glacier (New Zealand), in the headwaters of the Waitaki River basin
- Richardson Glacier (Antarctica)
- Richardson Bluff, Victoria Land, Antarctica

== American schools ==
- Richardson High School, Richardson, Texas
- Richardson Middle School, Torrance Unified School District, California

== Transportation ==
- Richardson Highway, Alaska, United States
- Richardson (1903 cyclecar), an early British car
- Richardson (1919 cyclecar), a car made in Sheffield, England

== Other uses ==
- Richardson baronets, five baronetcies, one in the Baronetage of Nova Scotia, one in the Baronetage of Ireland and three in the Baronetage of the United Kingdom
- Richardson Professor of Applied Mathematics, University of Manchester, England
- Richardson family murders, 2006 triple homicide in Medicine Hat, Alberta, Canada
- Richardson number, a dimensionless number that expresses the ratio of potential to kinetic energy
- "Richardson", a 2011 single by Diego's Umbrella also released on their 2012 album Proper Cowboy
- Richardson Gang, a London crime gang in the 1960s
- Richardson Stadium (Davidson), Davidson, North Carolina, United States
- Richardson Stadium (Kingston), Kingston, Ontario, Canada

== See also ==
- Richardson Building (disambiguation)
- Richardson House (disambiguation)
- Richardson Fire, a 2011 Canadian forest fire
