= Richardson Lake (disambiguation) =

Richardson Lake may refer to:

- Richardson Lake, Minnesota
- Richardson Lakes (Maine)
- Richardson Lakes, Antarctica
