= Malcolm-Jamal Warner =

American actor (1970–2025)

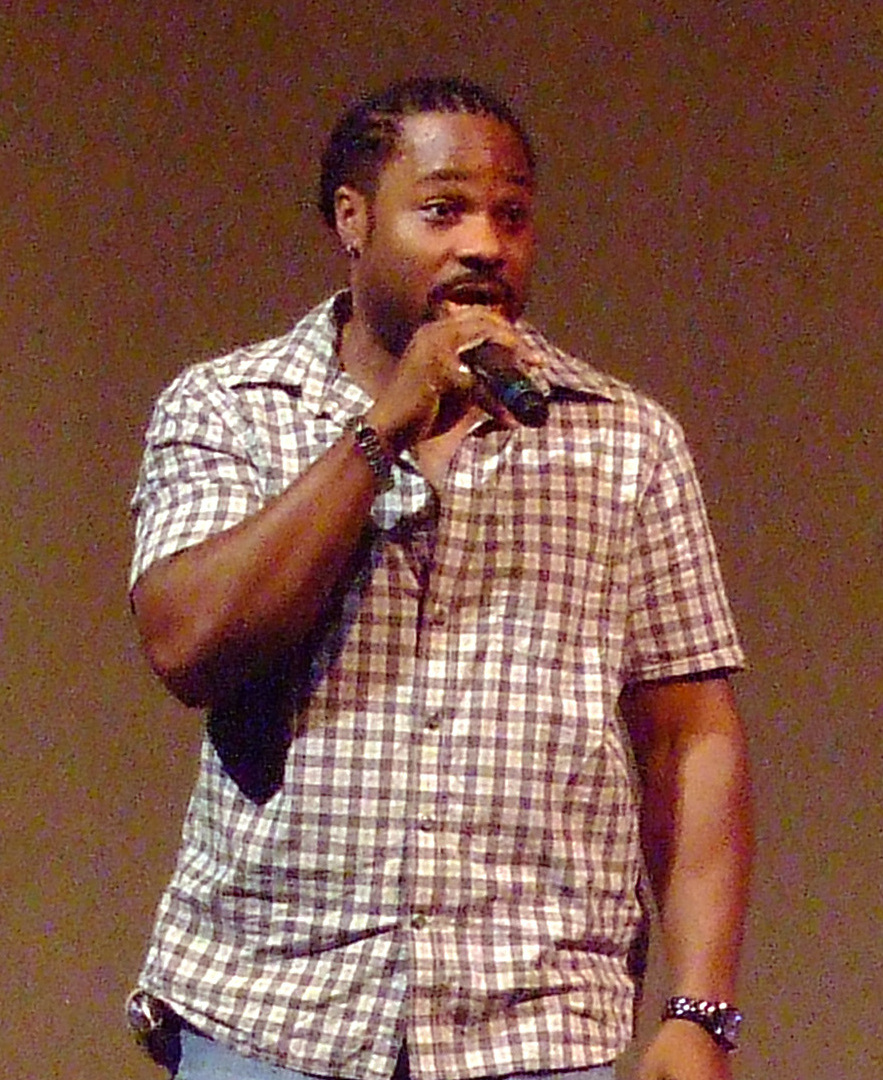
- Warner in 2007
- Born: August 18, 1970; Jersey City, New Jersey, U.S.
- Died: July 20, 2025 (aged 54); Playa Cocles, Limón Province, Costa Rica
- Occupations: Actor; musician; poet
- Years active: 1982–2025
- Spouse: Tenisha Hancock (m. 2022)
- Children: 1

Malcolm-Jamal Warner (August 18, 1970 – July 20, 2025) was an American actor, musician and poet. He rose to prominence for his role as Theodore Huxtable on the NBC sitcom The Cosby Show (1984–1992), which earned him an Emmy nomination for Outstanding Supporting Actor in a Comedy Series at the 38th Primetime Emmy Awards. He was also known for his roles as Malcolm McGee on the sitcom Malcolm & Eddie (1996–2000), Dr. Alex Reed in the sitcom Reed Between the Lines (2011, 2015), Julius Rowe in Suits (2016–2017) and Dr. AJ Austin in the medical drama The Resident (2018–2023).

In 2015, Warner received a Grammy Award for Best Traditional R&B Performance for the song "Jesus Children" alongside Robert Glasper Experiment and Lalah Hathaway.

On July 20, 2025, Warner died from drowning in the ocean off Limón Province, Costa Rica, after being caught in a strong current.

== Early life ==
Warner was born in Jersey City, New Jersey, on August 18, 1970. He was named after Malcolm X and jazz pianist Ahmad Jamal. He was raised in Los Angeles from age five. At the age of nine, he demonstrated an interest in show business that led to enrollment in acting schools. His career as a child performer later led him to graduate high school from The Professional Children's School in New York City, New York.

== Career ==
=== Acting ===
After appearances on television shows such as Matt Houston, Fame and Call to Glory, Warner landed his most successful role as Theo Huxtable, the only son of Heathcliff Huxtable, who was played by Bill Cosby on the NBC sitcom, The Cosby Show from 1984 to 1992. Warner auditioned for the role on the final day of the nationwide search. In 1986, he was nominated for Outstanding Supporting Actor in a Comedy Series at the 38th Primetime Emmy Awards.

Warner guest starred in an episode of The Fresh Prince of Bel-Air, playing the role of Hilary Banks' boyfriend (1991). He starred in the short-lived NBC sitcom Here and Now (1992–1993). Warner also hosted the literacy-promoting children's show CBS Storybreak in 1993 and 1994. In 1995, Warner appeared as a homeless man on Touched by an Angel. He also portrayed U.S. Marshal Terry Nessip in the film Drop Zone with Wesley Snipes (1994), Rory Holloway in the HBO film Tyson and Leroy Cappy in the HBO film The Tuskegee Airmen (both 1995).

Warner was the voice of The Producer character on The Magic School Bus (1994–1997). From 1996 to 2000, Warner co-starred with comedian Eddie Griffin on the UPN sitcom Malcolm & Eddie. He went on to co-star as Kurdy Malloy in Jeremiah (2002–2004), and appeared in the CBS sitcom Listen Up with Jason Alexander (2004–2005).

In 2008, he portrayed Cordell in the Matthew McConaughey and Kate Hudson rom-com film Fool's Gold. In 2009, he guest starred in an episode in the TNT series HawthoRNe. In 2011 and 2012, he guest starred in four episodes of the NBC series Community as Andre, the ex-husband of Shirley Bennett (Yvette Nicole Brown). His character subtly referenced his Cosby Show past by wearing a "Cosby sweater" that he stated was from his dad.

Warner co-starred in BET's 2011 scripted comedic television series Reed Between the Lines. He played the role of Alex Reed, an English professor married to Carla Reed, a psychologist played by former Girlfriends star Tracee Ellis Ross. The couple had three children: Kaci and Kenan Reynolds, Carla's children from a previous relationship, and Alexis Reed, their child together. The show highlighted the couple's ups and downs together as a blended family. In 2012, Warner was nominated for Outstanding Actor in a comedy series at the NAACP Image Awards for his role in Reed Between the Lines.

On the third season (2014–2015) of TNT police procedural Major Crimes, Warner portrayed Lt. Chuck Cooper, a member of the LAPD's Special Investigation's Section. Warner portrayed Al Cowlings in the 2016 crime series American Crime Story production The People v. O.J Simpson, based on the events of the O. J. Simpson trial. Warner played prison counselor Julius Rowe on the sixth season (2016–2017) of USA's Suits. He also played the role of parole officer James Bagwell on Amazon Prime's show Sneaky Pete (2017–2019). From 2018 to 2023, he appeared as Dr. AJ "The Raptor" Austin on FOX's The Resident. Warner made his final on-screen appearance in FOX's Murder in a Small Town, guest starring on "Mother Love", the third episode of season two, which aired posthumously on October 7, 2025.

=== Directing ===
During his tenure on The Cosby Show, Warner turned his hand to directing, making music videos including New Edition's "N.E. Heart Break" (1989), rapper Special Ed's "I'm the Magnificent" (1989) and British R&B group Five Star's "I Love You For Sentimental Reasons" (1994). He directed episodes of sitcoms including The Cosby Show, All That, Kenan & Kel, Malcolm & Eddie, and The Fresh Prince of Bel-Air. Warner also directed the teen-oriented public health video Time Out: The Truth About HIV, AIDS, and You (1992), which featured Arsenio Hall and Earvin "Magic" Johnson discussing the realities of HIV and AIDS and the best ways to prevent its spread.

=== Music and poetry ===
In 2003, Warner released his debut jazz-funk EP, The Miles Long Mixtape. In 2007, Warner followed up with his second CD titled Love & Other Social Issues. In 2015, he received a Grammy Award for Best Traditional R&B Performance for his contribution to a cover of Stevie Wonder's "Jesus Children of America". Warner performed a poem on the track, dedicated to the victims of the Sandy Hook Elementary School shooting, along with musicians Robert Glasper Experiment and Lalah Hathaway.

Warner played bass guitar, performing in a band where he recited his poetry over the music.

Warner performed at the National Black Theatre Festival from 2003 onwards, in addition to hosting its Poetry Jam. Warner's 2022 spoken word poetry album Hiding in Plain View was nominated for a Grammy Award for Best Spoken Word Poetry Album in the 65th Annual Grammy Awards, the first year the category was included in the awards.

=== Podcasting ===
In June 2024, Warner and cohosts Weusi Baraka and Candace Kelley created the Not All Hood (NAH) podcast to discuss the lives and experiences of Black Americans.

== Personal life ==
Warner was involved in several high-profile relationships. He dated actress Michelle Thomas, who portrayed his on-screen girlfriend Justine Phillips on The Cosby Show, until 1994. They remained friends until her death in 1998. He was later in a relationship with actress Karen Malina White for seven and a half years and with actress Regina King from 2011 to 2013. He married Tenisha Hancock in May 2022 and they had one daughter together who was eight years old at the time of his death. His wife and daughter's identities were first disclosed after his death was announced.

== Death ==
On July 20, 2025, Warner went with a group learning to surf at Playa Cocles in Limón Province, Costa Rica. Warner had been playing with his daughter at the seashore. He left her safely out of the water before entering the sea with a friend. According to Mike Geist, vice president of Caribbean Guard, a volunteer lifeguard organization that patrols beaches in the area, stated that after their surf lesson, Warner and several others remained at the beach for some time before deciding to return to the water. The area was experiencing strong ocean currents, and several members of the group soon found themselves in distress.

With assistance from beachgoers, the three were eventually able to reach the shore. After finding out that Warner was missing, an unnamed boogie boarder and doctor moved into the water in hopes of finding him. After about a five-minute search, the unnamed doctor, as well as Geist's friend, a trained lifeguard who was there to surf, located Warner unconscious and submerged in water, on the bottom of the seafloor. According to the Costa Rican Red Cross, emergency responders were dispatched at approximately 2:10 p.m. Warner was pulled out of the water and placed on top of the surfboard. He received CPR for about 35 to 45 minutes before being pronounced dead at the scene at the age of 54. A second man was transported to a nearby clinic in critical condition. The Red Cross stated that both victims had been removed from the water prior to paramedics' arrival, and the case was referred to local police. No lifeguards were on duty because the Caribbean Guard had shifted its limited resources and personnel to other nearby beaches such as Playa Negra and Playa Chiquita following a recent spike in water incidents there.

On July 21, 2025, the Judicial Investigation Agency confirmed that the official cause of death was accidental asphyxia by submersion following the completion of his autopsy on July 22.

=== Tributes ===
On August 8, Pamela Warner shared a tribute on a newly established Instagram account celebrating her son's life. She expressed comfort in knowing that in his final moments, "he was at peace and did not suffer". She described him as a devoted husband, father, and son, as well as her confidant and partner. Pamela highlighted his dedication to his craft, having found full confidence in acting at age eight and later pursuing music as well as poetry, culminating in Grammy recognition. She encouraged those who are grieving to cherish the aspects of his life that resonated most deeply, saying that keeping those memories alive would sustain his spirit.

Notable figures and costars who paid tribute to Warner included Beyoncé, Bill Cosby, Phylicia Rashad, Morris Chestnut, Karen Malina White, Eddie Griffin, Magic Johnson, Tyrese Gibson, Raven-Symoné, Keshia Knight Pulliam and Gary LeRoi Gray.

== Filmography ==
=== Film ===
Year	Title	Role	Notes
1986	Show Off! How to Be Cool at Parties	Himself	Video
1987	The Father Clements Story	Joey	TV movie
1989	Mother's Day	Cullen Sturgis	TV movie
1990	The Earth Day Special	Theo Huxtable	TV movie
1991	The Real Story of Itsy Bitsy Spider	Spinner (voice)	TV movie
1994	Drop Zone	Deputy U.S. Marshal Terry Nessip	
1995	Tyson	Rory Holloway	TV movie
1995	The Tuskegee Airmen	Leroy Cappy	TV movie
1998	Restaurant	Steven	
1999	A Fare to Remember	Winter Valen	
2001	Legend of the Candy Cane	Rusty (voice)	TV movie
2004	Reflections: A Story of Redemption	Samuel	Short
2007	The List	Randy	
2007	There's Hope	Lead	Short
2008	Fool's Gold	Cordell	
2009	Contradictions of a Heart	Miles Long Band	Video
2011	King of the Underground	Malcolm	
2014	Muted	Curtis Gladwell	Short
2015	Megachurch Murder	Rev. Hamilton Spears	
2016	Wannabe	Luther	Short
2017	You Can't Hear Me	The Voice	Short
2017	Shot	EMT Jones	

=== Television ===
Year	Title	Role	Notes
1982	Matt Houston	Johnny Randolph	Episode: "Stop the Presses"
1983	Fame	Lucas Boyd	Episode: "Ending on a High Note"
1984	Call to Glory	-	Episode: "A Nation Divided"
1984–1992	The Cosby Show	Theodore "Theo" Huxtable	Main cast
1985	Body Language	Himself	Recurring role
1986	ABC Afterschool Special	Charlie Curtis	Episode: "A Desperate Exit"
1986	Saturday Night Live	Himself/Host	Episode: "Malcolm-Jamal Warner/Run-DMC"
1985–1988	Sesame Street	Himself	Guest (season 17 & 19)
1985–1988	TV's Bloopers & Practical Jokes	Himself	Guest (seasons 3–4)
1987	The New Hollywood Squares	Himself/Panelist	Episode: "April 27, 1987"
1987	Matlock	Himself	Episode: "The Network"
1988–1989	A Different World	Theo Huxtable	Guest (seasons 1–2)
1989	Tour of Duty	SPC Sweet	Episode: "The Volunteer"
1990	Saturday Morning Videos	Himself	Host
1990–1991	The Fresh Prince of Bel-Air	Himself/Eric	Guest (seasons 1–2)
1992–1993	Here and Now	Alexander "A.J." James	Main cast
1993–1994	CBS Storybreak	Host	
1994–1997	The Magic School Bus	The Producer (voice)	Recurring role
1995	Touched by an Angel	Zack	Episode: "There But for the Grace of God"
1996–2000	Malcolm & Eddie	Malcolm McGee	Main cast
1997	Adventures from the Book of Virtues	Henry (voice)	Episode: "Faith"
1997	Moloney	Frank Preston	Episode: "The Ripple Effect"
1999	Sliders	R.J.	Episode: "My Brother's Keeper"
2002	Static Shock	Lester Biggs (voice)	Episode: "Duped"
2002	Lyric Cafe	Himself	Host
2002–2004	Jeremiah	Kurdy Malloy	Main cast
2004	Stripperella	Robber (voice)	Episode: "The Bridesmaid"
2004–2005	Listen Up	Bernie Widmer	Main cast
2006	Dexter	Rita's Lawyer	Episode: "Seeing Red"
2008	The Cleaner	Jason Anders	Episode: "Lie with Me"
2009	HawthoRNe	Fred	Episode: "Healing Time"
2009	Sherri	Kevin	Main cast
2010	Special Agent Oso	Braden's Dad (voice)	Episode: "The Living Holiday Lights"
2011–2012	Community	Andre Bennett	Recurring role (season 2); guest (season 3)
2011–2015	Reed Between the Lines	Dr. Alex Reed	Main cast
2012	Hard: Life of a Bondservant	Jerry Hampton	Episode: "Know God"
2013	Friends in Therapy	Tae'Quon Jones	Episode: "Extra Bacon"
2013–2014	Key & Peele	Arthur Washington/Dad #3	Guest (seasons 3–4)
2013–2016	Major Crimes	Lt. Chuck Cooper	Recurring role (seasons 2–5)
2014	The Michael J. Fox Show	Russel	Episode: "Party"
2014	Sons of Anarchy	Sticky	Recurring role (season 7)
2014–2015	American Horror Story: Freak Show	Angus T. Jefferson	Recurring role
2016	The People v. O. J. Simpson: American Crime Story	Al "A.C." Cowlings	Recurring role
2016	House of Lies	Yurgen Celebi	Episode: "Holacracy"
2016–2017	Suits	Julius Rowe	Recurring role (season 6)
2017	Lethal Weapon	David Reed	Episode: "Lawmen"
2017	Detroiters	Sebastian	Episode: "Hog Riders"
2017	White Famous	Nelson Youngblood	Episode: "Scandal"
2017	Ten Days in the Valley	Matt Walker	Main cast
2017–2018	Girlfriends' Guide to Divorce	Darrell	Recurring role (seasons 3–4); guest (season 5)
2017–2019	Sneaky Pete	James Bagwell	Recurring role (seasons 1–2); guest (season 3)
2018–2023	The Resident	Dr. AJ Austin	Recurring role (season 1); main cast (seasons 2–6)
2020	Puppy Dog Pals	Floyd (voice)	Episode: "Pups in the Apple/Won't You Be My Puppy"
2021	The Chicken Squad	Lieutenant Scruffy (voice)	Recurring role
2023	Accused	Kendall Gomillion	Episode: "Kendall's Story"
2023	The Wonder Years	Melvin Williams	Episode: "Happy Birthday, Clisby"
2023	The Irrational	Dustin Atwood	Episode: "Point and Shoot"
2023	Carol & the End of the World	Guest Performer (voice)	Episode: "The Beetle Broach"
2024	Grown-ish	Darnell	Episode: "Hard Times"
2024	9-1-1	Amir Casey	Recurring role (season 7)
2025	Alert: Missing Persons Unit	Chief Inspector Bill Houston	Recurring role (season 3)
2025	Murder in a Small Town	Mr. Bannister	Episode: "Mother Love"; posthumous release

== Discography ==
- The Miles Long Mixtape (2003)
- Love & Other Social Issues (2007)
- Selfless (2015)
- Hiding in Plain View (2022)

== Awards and nominations ==
=== Emmy Awards ===
Year	Category	Work	Result	Ref.
1986	Outstanding Supporting Actor in a Comedy Series	The Cosby Show	Nominated	

=== Grammy Awards ===
Year	Category	Work	Result	Ref.
2015	Best Traditional R&B Performance	"Jesus Children" (with Robert Glasper Experiment featuring Lalah Hathaway)	Won	
2023	Best Spoken Word Poetry Album	Hiding In Plain View	Nominated	

=== NAACP Image Awards ===
Year	Category	Work	Result	Ref.
1989	Outstanding Lead Actor in a Television Movie or Mini-Series	Mother's Day	Nominated	
1996	Outstanding Supporting Actor in a Drama Series	Touched by an Angel	Nominated	
2001	Outstanding Actor in a Comedy Series	Malcolm & Eddie	Nominated	
2010	Outstanding Supporting Actor in a Comedy Series	Sherri	Nominated	
2012	Outstanding Actor in a Comedy Series	Reed Between the Lines	Won	
2026	Outstanding Guest Performance	Murder in a Small Town	Won	

=== Miscellaneous awards ===
Year	Award	Category	Work	Result	Ref.
1984	Young Artist Award	Best Young Supporting Actor in a Television Comedy Series	The Cosby Show	Won	
1987	Young Artist Award	Best Young Male Superstar in Television	The Cosby Show	Nominated	
1989	Young Artist Award	Best Young Actor/Actress Ensemble in a Television Comedy, Drama Series or Special	The Cosby Show	Won	
1990	Young Artist Award	Best Young Actor Supporting Role in a Television Series	The Cosby Show	Won	
2005	BET Comedy Awards	Outstanding Supporting Actor in a Comedy Series	Listen Up	Nominated	
2006	TV Land Awards	Favorite Singing Siblings	The Cosby Show	Nominated	
2011	TV Land Awards	Impact Award	The Cosby Show	Honored	
2012	NAMIC Vision Awards	Best Performance - Comedy	Reed Between the Lines	Nominated	
2013	MD Theatre Guide Readers' Choice Awards	Best Performance by Lead Actor in a Play	Doctor John Prentice in Guess Who's Coming to Dinner at Arena Stage	First place	
2015	Voice Arts Awards	Outstanding Spoken Word or Storytelling - Best Performance	Training Daze	Won	

== Book ==
- Theo and Me: Growing up Okay (1988). ISBN 0-525-24694-0 (with Daniel Paisner).
