= Black sand =

Black-colored rock and mineral particles

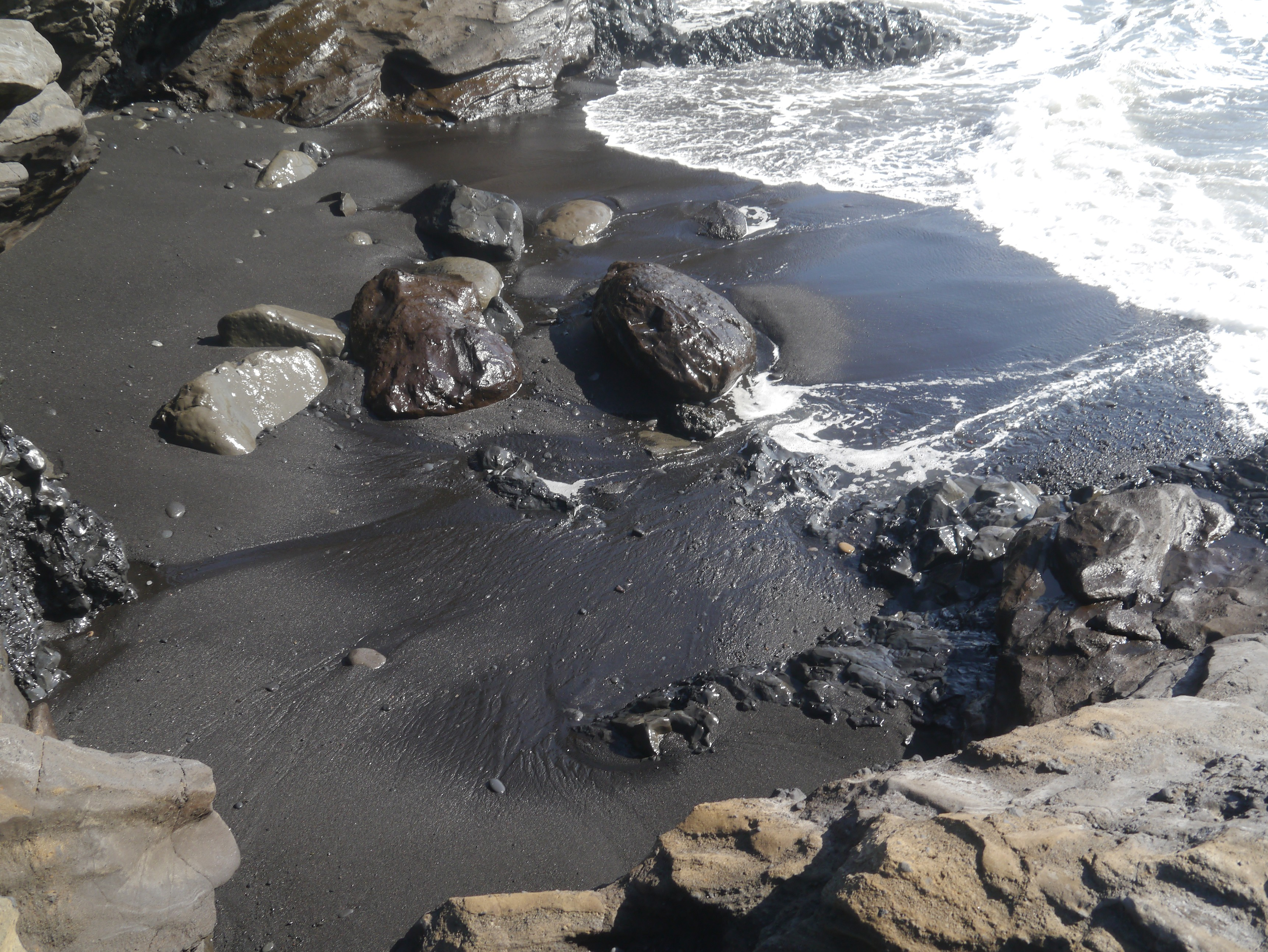
Black sand on a beach in Southern Iceland

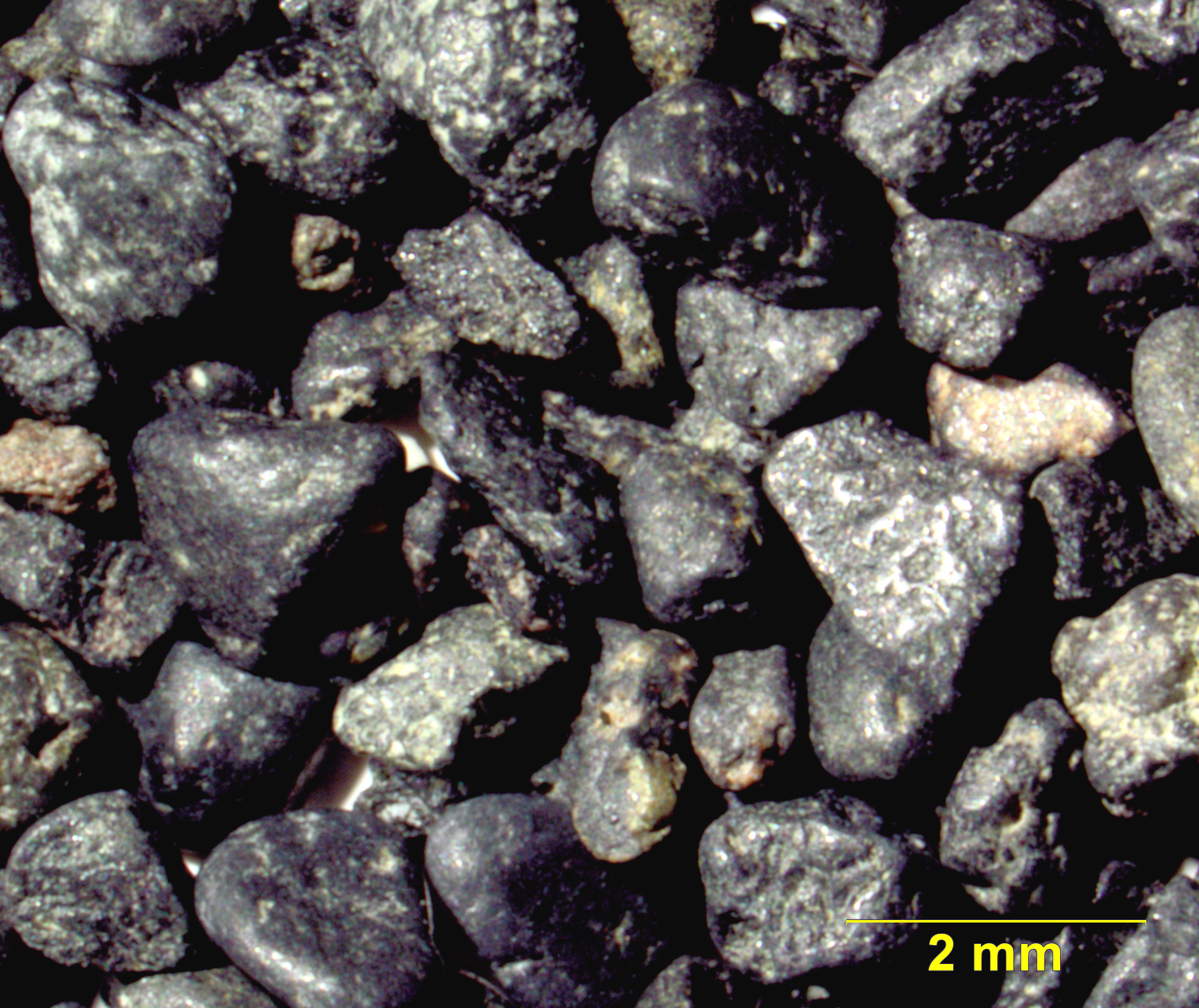
Closeup of black sand from a beach in Maui, Hawaii

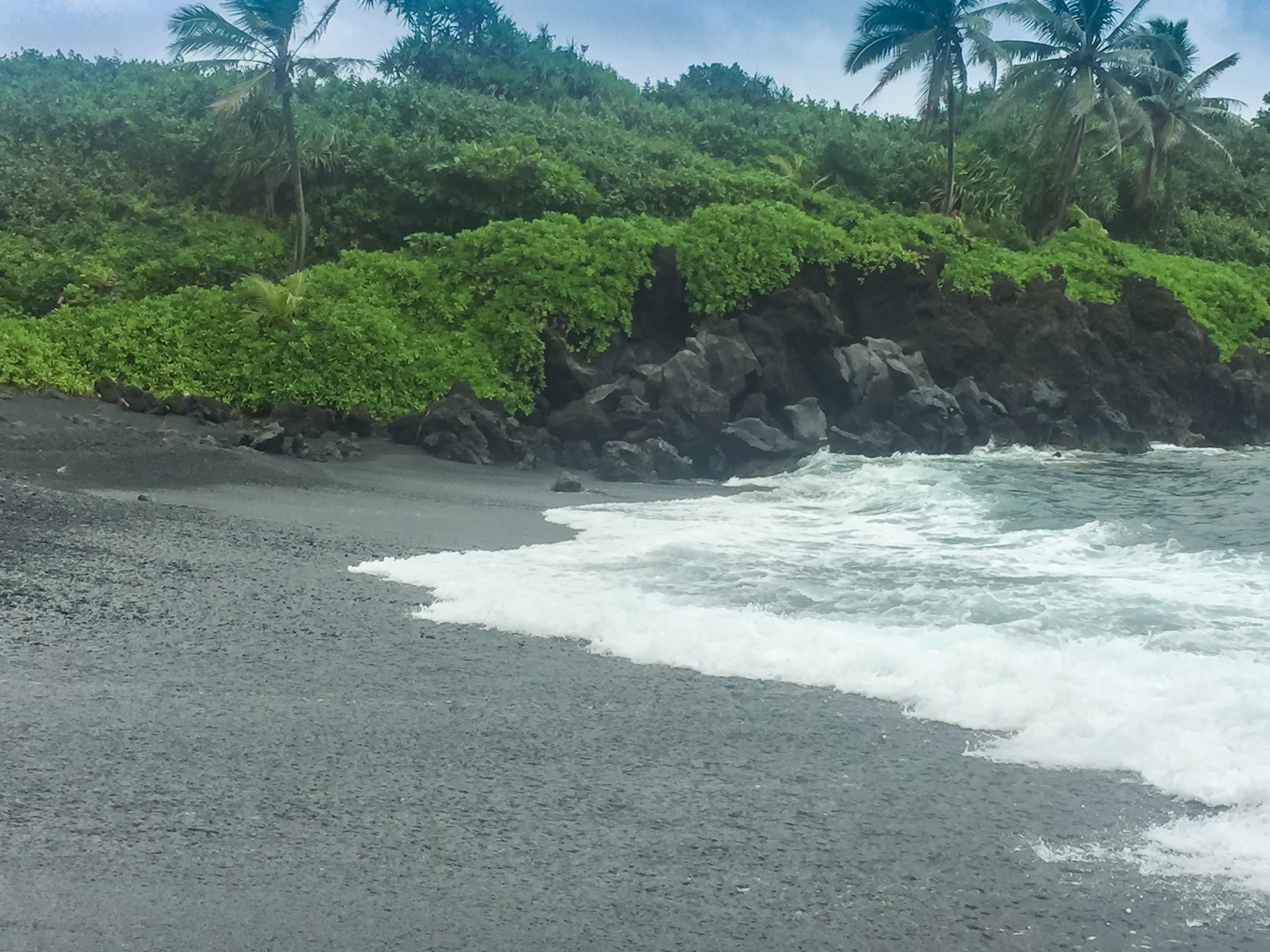
Black sand beach in Waianapanapa Park, Hawaii

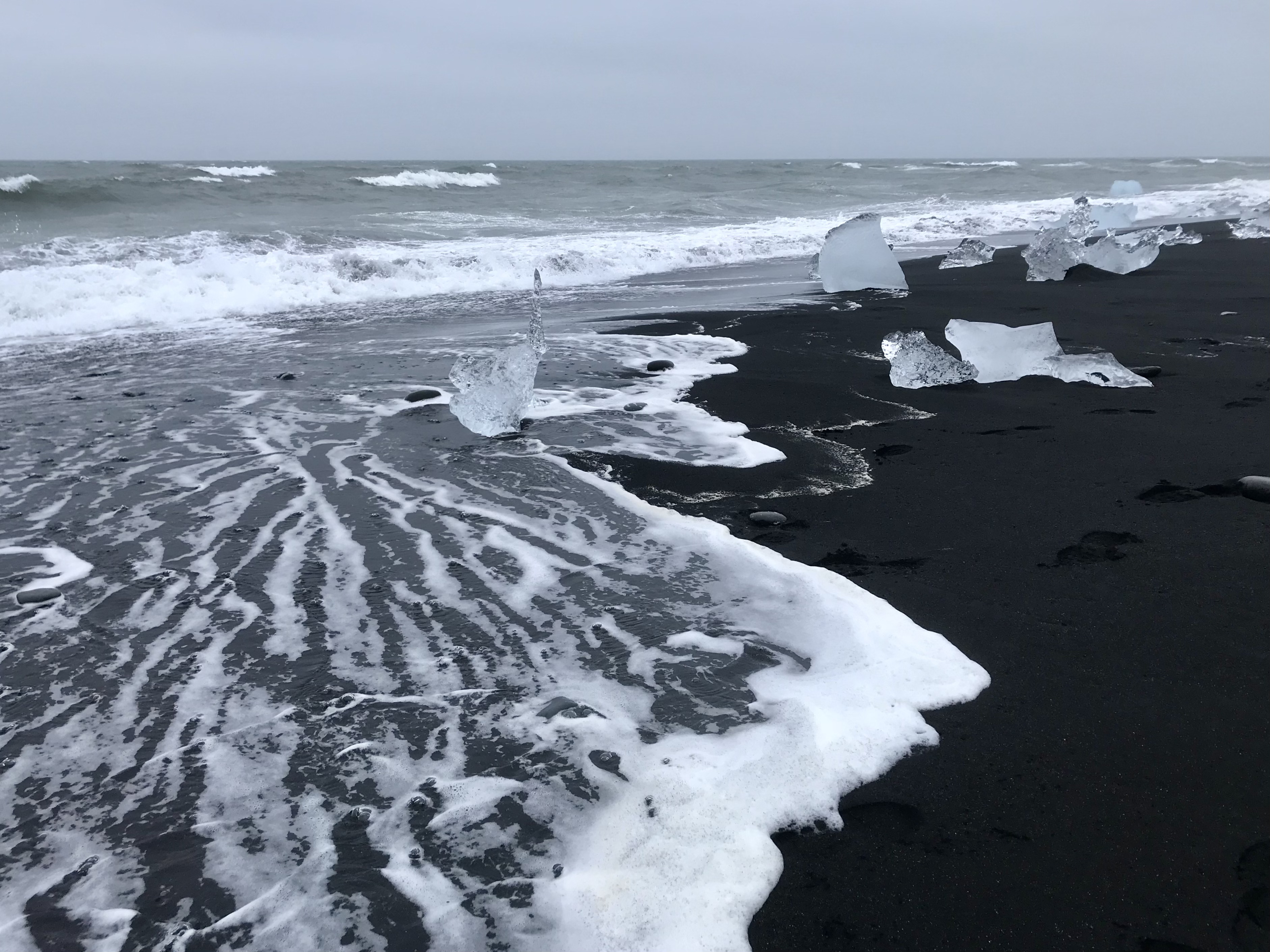
Black sand and icebergs on a beach in Iceland

Black sand is sand that is black in color. One type of black sand is a heavy, glossy, partly magnetic mixture of usually fine sands containing minerals such as magnetite, found as part of a placer deposit. Another type of black sand, found on beaches near a volcano, consists of tiny fragments of basalt.

While some beaches are predominantly made of black sand, even other color beaches (e.g. gold and white) can often have deposits of black sand, particularly after storms. Larger waves can sort out sand grains leaving deposits of heavy minerals visible on the surface of erosion escarpments.

== Placer deposits ==
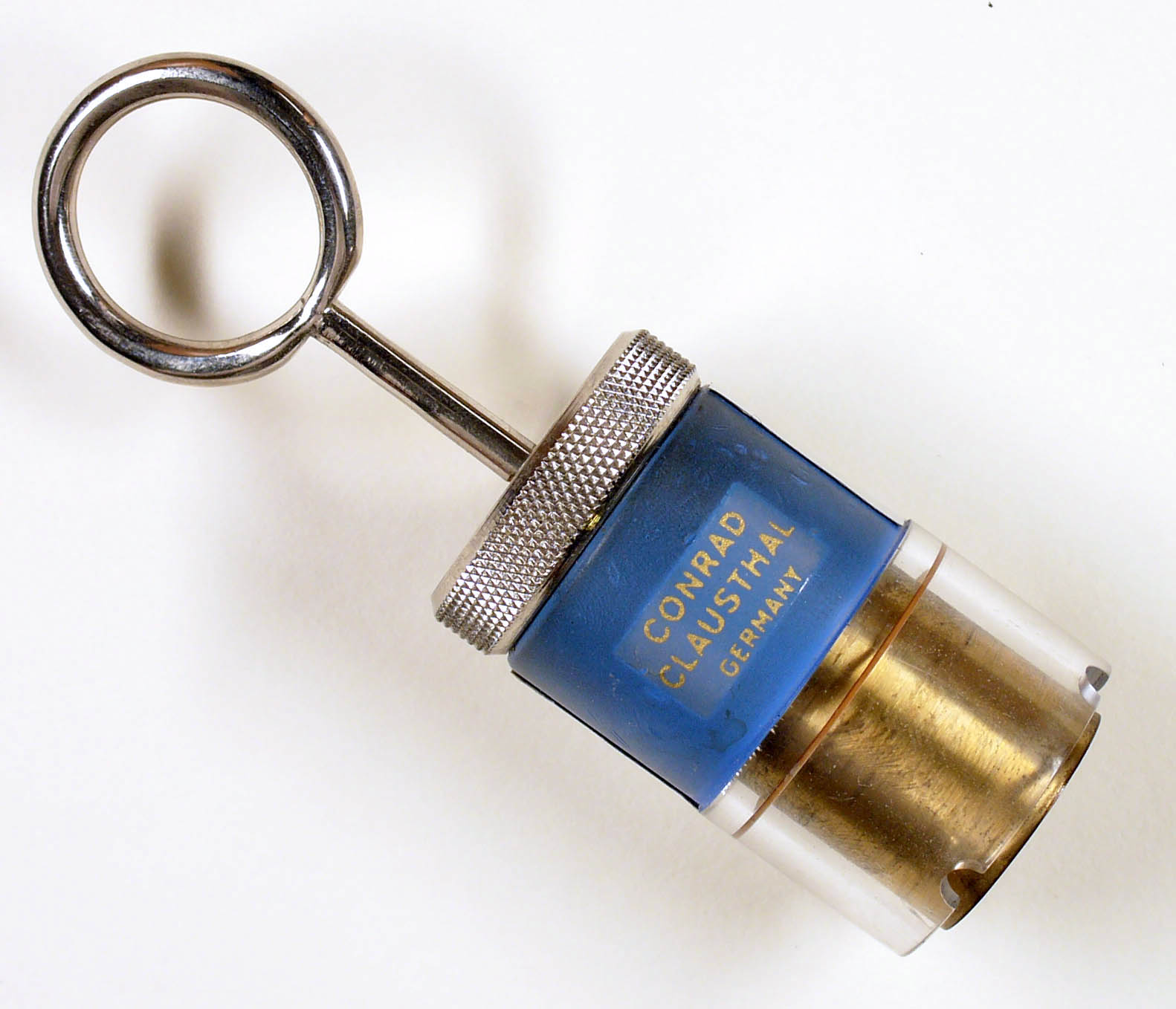
Magnet for separation of black sand by hand

Black sands are used by miners and prospectors to indicate the presence of a placer formation. Placer mining activities produce a concentrate that is composed mostly of black sand. Black sand concentrates often contain additional valuables, other than precious metals: rare earth elements, thorium, titanium, tungsten, zirconium and others are often fractionated during igneous processes into a common mineral-suite that becomes black sands after weathering and erosion.

Several gemstones, such as garnet, topaz, ruby, sapphire, and diamond are found in placers and in the course of placer mining, and sands of these gems are found in black sands and concentrates. Purple or ruby-colored garnet sand often forms a showy surface dressing on ocean beach placers.

An example of a non-volcanic black sand beach is at Langkawi in Malaysia.

== Basalt fragments ==
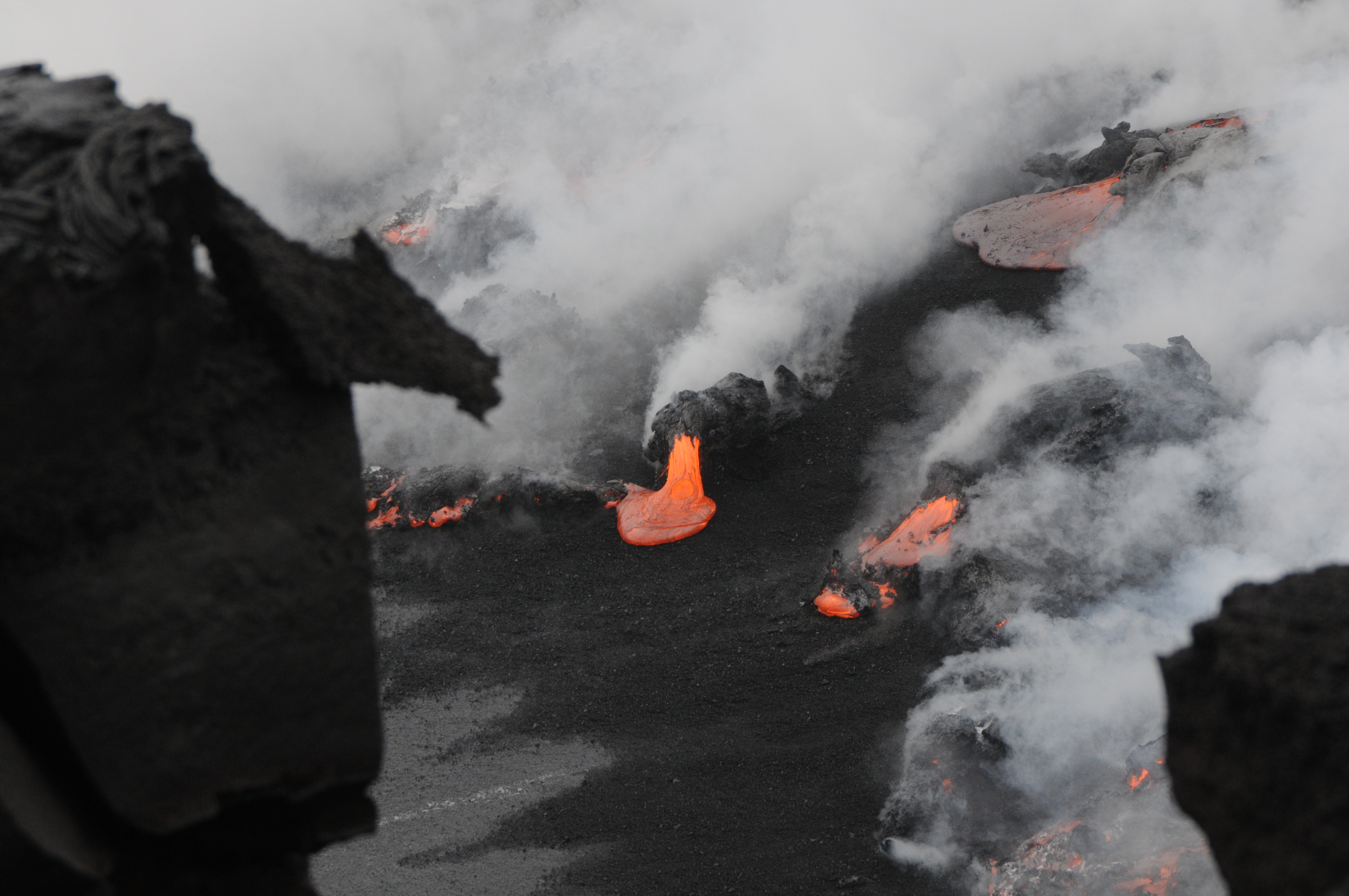
Black sand forming when lava hits ocean. Kīlauea volcano.

When lava contacts water, it cools rapidly and shatters into sand and fragmented debris of various size. Much of the debris is small enough to be considered sand. A large lava flow entering an ocean may produce enough basalt fragments to build a new black sand beach almost overnight. The famous "black sand" beaches of Hawaii, such as Punaluʻu Beach and Kehena Beach, were created virtually instantaneously by the violent interaction between hot lava and sea water. Since a black sand beach is made by a lava flow in a one time event, they tend to be rather short lived since sands do not get replenished if currents or storms wash sand into deeper water. For this reason, the state of Hawaii has made it illegal to remove black sand from its beaches. Further, a black sand beach is vulnerable to being inundated by future lava flows, as was the case for Hawaiʻi's Kaimū, usually known simply as Black Sand Beach, and Kalapana beaches. An even shorter-lived black sand beach was Kamoamoa. Unlike with white and green sand beaches, walking barefoot on black sand can result in burns, as the black sand absorbs more solar radiation.

== Beaches ==
Black sand has formed beaches in places including:

=== Europe ===
- Bulgaria
  - Burgas
- Faroe Islands
  - Tjørnuvík
- Italy
  - Ladispoli
  - Naples
  - Stromboli
  - Lipari
  - Vulcano
  - Salina
  - Taormina
  - Catania
  - Pantelleria
  - Maratea
  - Lake Bolsena
- Georgia
  - Ureki
- Greece
  - Perivolos beach, Santorini
- Cyprus
  - Governor's Beach, Limassol
- Iceland
  - Vík í Mýrdal
  - Reykjanes
  - Stokksnes
- Portugal
  - Azores
    - São Roque, São Miguel
    - Mosteiros, São Miguel
  - Madeira
- Spain
  - Tenerife
    - Playa El Bollullo, near Puerto de la Cruz
    - Playa Jardín, Puerto de la Cruz
    - Playa Las Gaviotas near Santa Cruz
  - La Palma
    - Playa de Los Cancajos, Breña Baja
  - Fuerteventura
    - Playa de Ajuy
    - Playa Pozo Negro
  - Galicia
    - Praia de Teixidelo, Cedeira (non-volcanic)
- Turkey
  - Karakum Plajı, Sinop

=== Africa ===
- Egypt
- Ethiopia
- Algeria
- Cameroon
  - Limbe
  - Idenau
  - Debundscha

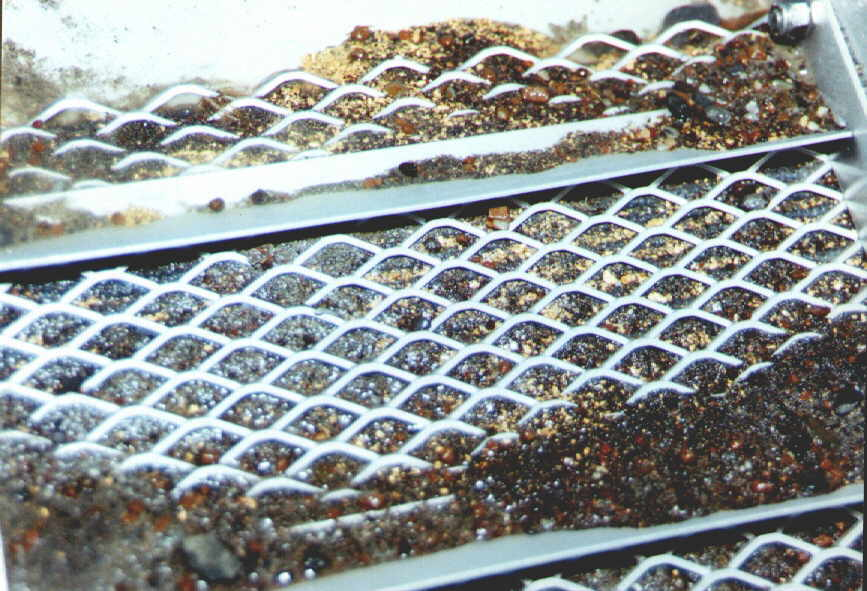
Black sands and gold in sluicebox, Blue Ribbon Mine, Alaska

=== North America ===
- Canada
  - Black Beach, Lorneville, New Brunswick (near Coleson Cove Generating station, west of Saint John)
  - Salmon Cove Beach, Conception Bay, Newfoundland
- Mexico
  - Playa Patzcuarito (Nayarit)
  - Playa La Ventanilla (Oaxaca)
- United States
  - Black Sand Beach, Prince William Sound, Alaska,
  - Lowell Point Beach, Seward, Alaska
  - Black Sand Beach, Lost Coast, California

=== Central America ===
- Costa Rica
  - Playa Negra, Guanacaste
  - Playa Negra, Puerto Viejo, Limón
- Guatemala
  - Puerto de San José, Monterrico, Champerico, Puerto Quetzal
- Panama
  - Las Lajas, Chiriquí Province
- El Salvador
  - Playa El Tunco

=== Caribbean ===
- Saint Vincent and the Grenadines
- Montserrat (most beaches except Rendezvous Beach)
- St. Eustatius
- St. Kitts
- Nevis
- Jamaica
- Dominica (most beaches)
- Martinique (most North east Beaches and Anse Noire beach)
- St. Lucia
  - Anse Chastanet
- Guadeloupe

- Grand Anse beach, Basse-Terre

- Grenada
- Venezuela
- Barranquilla, Colombia
- St.Thomas (USVI)
- Puerto Rico (US)

- Barceloneta, Machuca's Garden
- Playa Negra in Vieques

- Dominican Republic

- Cocolandia, Palenque Beach, San Cristóbal Province
- Baní Sand Dunes, Peravia, Baní
- Black Stone Beach, Santa Cruz, Aruba

=== Asia ===
- Akyab, Arakan
- Alappad, Kollam, Kerala, India
- Hac Sa Beach, Macao
- Hunza River, Pakistan
- Jambi, Indonesia
- Kaladan River, Chin State and Rakhine State, Myanmar
- Kaohsiung, Taiwan
- Langkawi, Malaysia
- Lingayen Gulf, Philippines
- Lung Kwu Tan, Hong Kong
- Trat, Thailand
- Valsad, India
- Yilan, Taiwan

=== North Atlantic ===
- Reynisfjara, Iceland

=== North Pacific ===
- Iwo Jima
- Kugenuma Kaigan, Japan
- Hawaii
  - "Big Island"
    - Isaac Hale Beach Park (Pohoʻiki)
    - Kaimū (destroyed by lava flow in 1990, now a new black sand beach is forming)
    - Kehena Beach
    - Punaluʻu Beach
    - Richardson Beach, Hilo
    - Waipiʻo Beach
  - Maui
    - Honokalani Black Sand Beach and Waiʻanapanapa Black Sand Beach in Waiʻanapanapa State Park
    - Oneʻuli Beach also known as Naupaka Beach

=== South Pacific ===
- Guam
  - Talafofo
- New Zealand (listed from North to South)
  - Muriwai
  - Bethells Beach
  - Anawhata
  - Piha
  - Karekare
  - Whatipu
  - Karioitahi Beach
  - Raglan
  - Taranaki region, New Zealand
  - Wellington region, New Zealand
- Tahiti
  - Tautira
  - Point Venus
- Papua New Guinea
  - Gulf of Papua

=== Indian Ocean ===
- South coast of Java, Indonesia (ironsand)

== See also ==
- Diamond
- Heavy mineral sands ore deposits
- Ironsand
- Mining
- Placer deposit
