= Sneaker wave =

Disproportionately large coastal wave

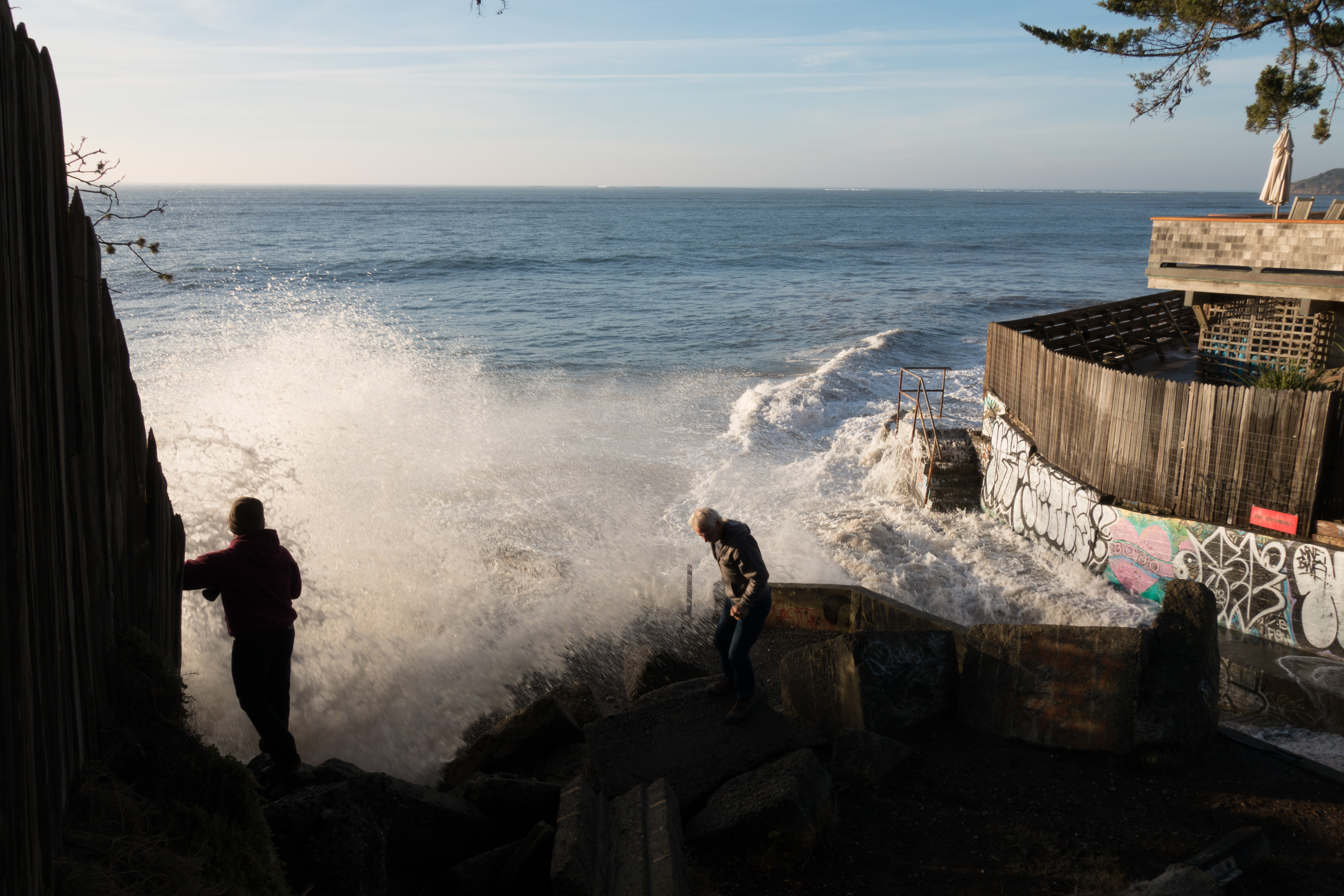
Sneaker wave at Bolinas, California

A sneaker wave, also known as a sleeper wave, or in Australia as a king wave, is a disproportionately large coastal wave that can sometimes appear in a wave train without warning.

== Terminology ==
The term "sneaker wave" is popular rather than scientific, derived from the observation that such a wave can "sneak up" on an unwary beachgoer. There is no scientific coverage of the phenomenon as a distinct sort of wave with respect to height or predictability as there is on other extreme wave events such as tsunamis or rogue waves, and little or no scientific evidence has been gathered to identify, describe, or define sneaker waves. Although the term "rogue wave" — meaning an unusually tall or steep wave in mid-ocean — is sometimes used as a synonym for "sneaker wave," one American oceanographer distinguishes "rogue waves" as occurring on the ocean and "sneaker waves" as occurring at the shore, while the National Oceanic and Atmospheric Administration loosely defines rogue waves as offshore waves that are at least twice the height of surrounding waves and sneaker waves as waves near shore that are unexpectedly and significantly larger than other waves reaching shore at the time. Scientists do not yet understand what causes sneaker waves, and their relationship to rogue waves, if any, has not been established.

In a 2018 paper, Oregon State University researchers wrote that sneaker waves form in offshore storms that transfer wind energy to the ocean surface. The resulting waves then arrive along a coastline during periods of calm weather, and the greater amount of energy they contain compared to the regular waves that preceded them causes them to travel far higher up the shore than the other waves. As of 2021, the National Weather Service in the United States viewed ocean conditions along the United States West Coast as favorable for sneaker waves when an offshore storm generates waves with a particularly long period — perhaps longer than 15 seconds — between swells, allowing the swells to build considerable force before reaching shore, where they might appear either as conventional large waves or as sneaker waves.

== Characteristics ==
Sneaker waves appear suddenly on a coastline and without warning; generally, it is not obvious that they are larger than other waves until they break and suddenly surge up a beach. A sneaker wave can occur following a period of 10 to 20 minutes of gentle, lapping waves. Upon arriving, a sneaker wave can surge more than 150 feet (50 m) beyond the foam line, rushing up a beach with great force. In addition to containing a large volume of rapidly surging water, a sneaker wave also tends to carry a large amount of sand and gravel with it. It can be strong enough to break over rocks and float or roll large, waterlogged logs lying on the beach weighing several hundred pounds, moving them up the beach during the landward surge and then back down toward the ocean as the wave retreats. Sneaker waves appear to be more common along steep coastlines than in areas with broader, more gently sloped beaches.

== Hazards ==
The unpredictability of sneaker waves and their tendency to arrive suddenly after lengthy periods of gentle, lapping waves makes it easy for them to surprise unwary or inexperienced beachgoers; because they are much larger than preceding waves, sneaker waves can catch inattentive swimmers, waders, and other people on beaches and ocean jetties and wash them into the sea. The force of a sneaker wave's surge and the large volume of water rushing far up a beach is enough to suddenly submerge people thigh- or waist-deep, knock them off their feet, and drag them into the ocean or trap them against rocks. Many coastlines more prone to sneaker waves lie in colder parts of the world where beachgoers tend to wear heavier clothing; the amount of sand and gravel in a sneaker wave can quickly fill such clothing and footwear such as boots with sediment that weighs a person down as he or she is swept up a beach and then back into the sea, increasing the chances of drowning. Floating and rolling logs in a sneaker wave also pose a danger, as they can badly injure people as well as pin people down when they come to rest, and it can be difficult or impossible to move such a log before a person pinned by it drowns as later waves arrive and fill the person's lungs with water and sediment.

== Geographic distribution ==
Sneaker waves are mainly referred to in warnings and reports of incidents for the coasts of Central and Northern California (including the San Francisco Bay Area's beaches, especially Ocean Beach, Baker Beach, and those that face the Pacific Ocean, e.g. from Big Sur to the California–Oregon border), Oregon, and Washington in the Western United States. Sneaker waves also occur on the coast of British Columbia in Western Canada, especially the province's southern coast, because they commonly occur on the west coast of Vancouver Island (including Tofino, Ucluelet, and Cape Scott Provincial Park). Sneaker waves are common on the southern coast of Iceland, and warning signs were erected at Reynisfjara and Kirkjufjara beaches, following four unrelated tourist deaths at those beaches over several years, the fourth of them in August 2025. In Australia, where they are known as "king waves," sneaker waves occur especially in Western Australia and Tasmania, where they can be a hazard for rock fishermen.

Along much of the United States West Coast, sneaker waves kill more people than all other weather hazards combined. In Oregon, 21 deaths were attributed to sneaker waves from 1990 through March 2021, most of the deaths occurring between October and April, although sneaker waves also occurred at other times of year.

A sneaker wave incident gained worldwide media attention when two large waves suddenly and unexpectedly struck a crowd watching the Mavericks surfing competition at Mavericks in Princeton-by-the-Sea, California, on February 13, 2010, breaking over a seawall onto a narrow beach and injuring at least 13 people. The incident was caught on film.

In March 2014, a massive wave struck Roi-Namur in Kwajalein Atoll in the Marshall Islands on an otherwise calm, sunny day, penetrating well inland, flooding parts of the island and swamping coastal roads.

On September 18, 2023, a sneaker wave smashed into a beachside restaurant at Marina Beach near Southbroom, South Africa, injuring seven people. One restaurant patron was swept out to sea but rescued by lifeguards. The wave was filmed.

Rio de Janeiro's Barra de Tijuca beach in Brazil experiences sneaker waves, known locally as ressaca waves. It also is a steep beach and a December 2023 news film shows the whole beach being cleared by a sneaker wave.

On 20 January 2024, one or more sneaker or rogue waves struck the United States Army′s Ronald Reagan Ballistic Missile Defense Test Site on Roi-Namur in Kwajalein Atoll in the Marshall Islands, breaking down the doors of a dining hall, knocking several people off their feet, moderately to severely damaging the dining hall, the Outrigger Bar and Grill, the chapel, and the Tradewinds Theater, and leaving parts of the island, including the automotive complex, underwater. The flooding of the dining hall was filmed. The wave or waves penetrated 300 feet (100 m) inland and probably were between 29 and 40 feet (8.8 and 12.2 m) tall amid a significant wave height of 10 feet (3 m) to 15 feet (5 m).

== Seventh wave ==
In many parts of the world, local folklore predicts that out of a certain number of waves, one will be much larger than the rest. "Every seventh wave" or "every ninth wave" are examples of such common beliefs that have wide circulation and have entered popular culture through music, literature, and art. These ideas have some scientific merit, due to the occurrence of wave groups at sea, but there is no explicit evidence for this specific phenomenon, or that these wave groups are related to sneaker waves. The saying is likely derived more from a cultural fascination with certain numbers, and it may also be designed to educate shore-dwellers about the necessity of remaining vigilant when near the ocean.

== See also ==
- Wind wave
- Rogue wave
- Tsunami
- Megatsunami
- Meteotsunami
