= Kehena Beach =

Beach in Hawaii, United States

Coordinates: 19.3949°N 154.9293°W

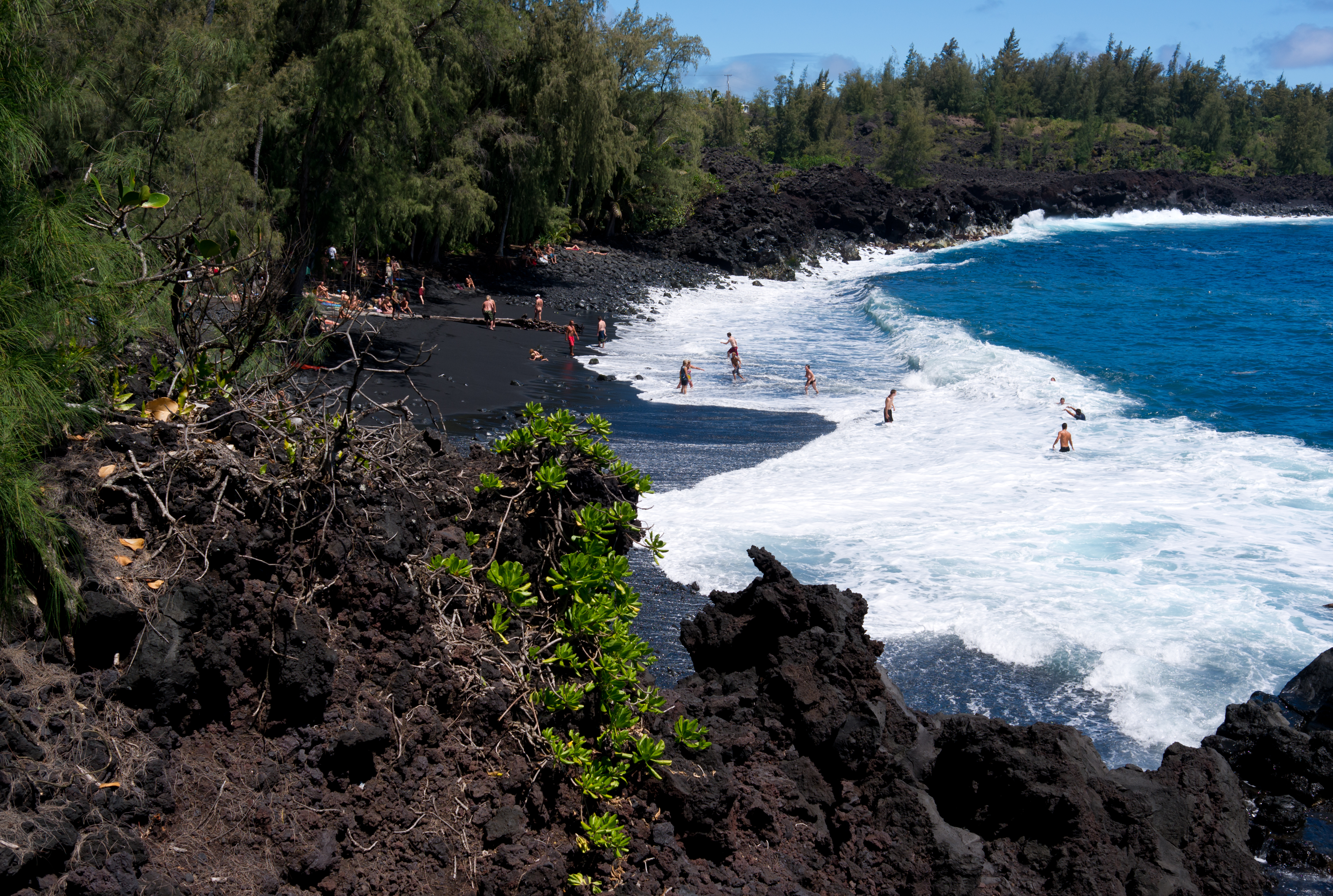
A photograph of the black sand on Kehena Beach

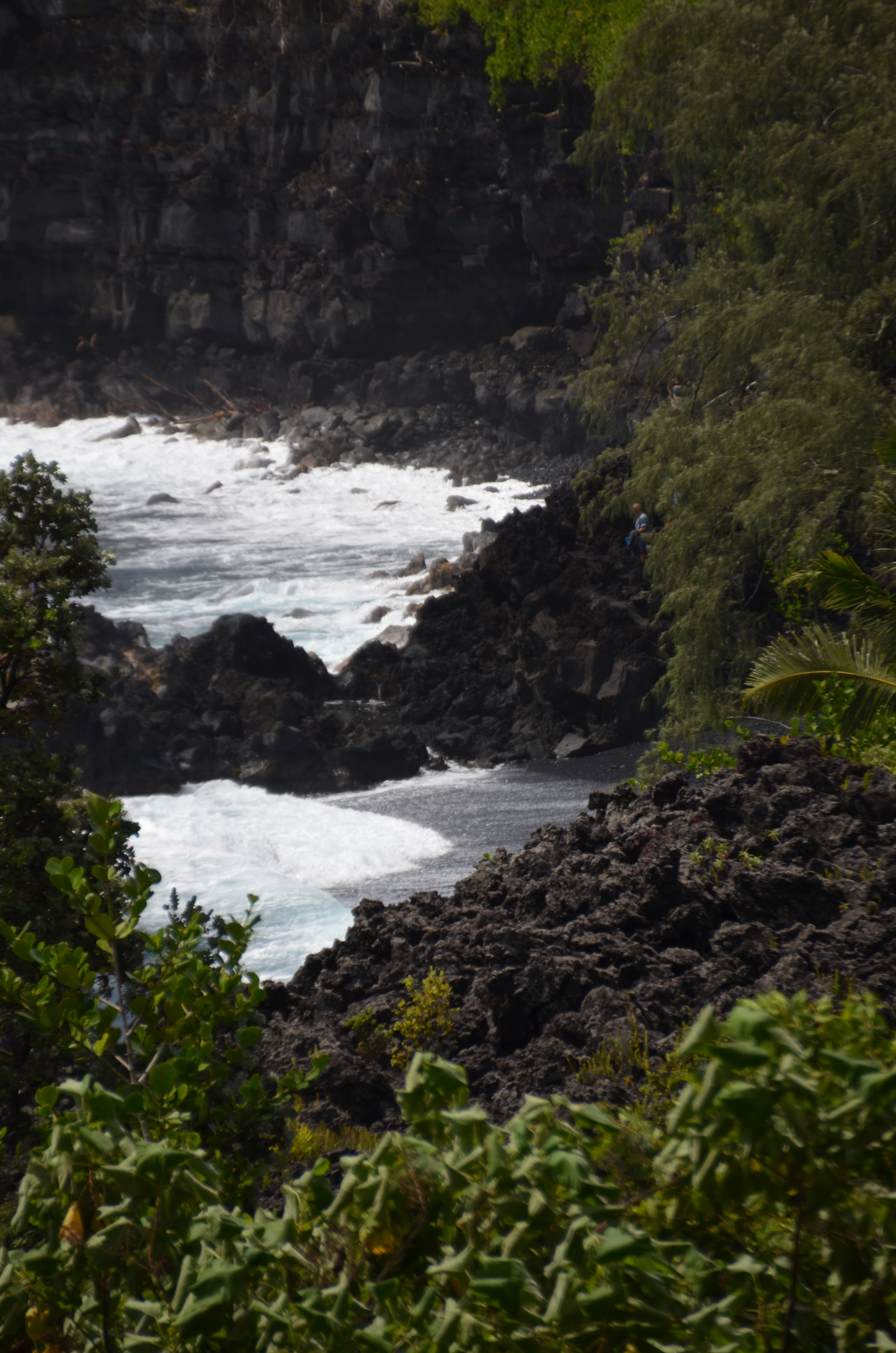
Lava formations on Kehena Beach

Kehena Beach is a narrow black sand beach located on the east shore of the island of Hawaii, in the Puna district. Spinner dolphins frequent the water; as a result, the beach has also been known as Dolphin Beach.

== Formation ==
The beach was formed in a 1955 lava flow. There is a point of rocks on one end of the beach that marks where the flow ended.

== Nudity ==
Kehena Beach is listed on many websites and guide books as clothing-option. Though nudity at the beach has been documented, nude beaches are not legal in Hawaii and officers have written citations for nudity at Kehena beach.
