= Reynisfjara =

Black sand beach in Iceland

Coordinates: 63.4035°N 19.0474°W

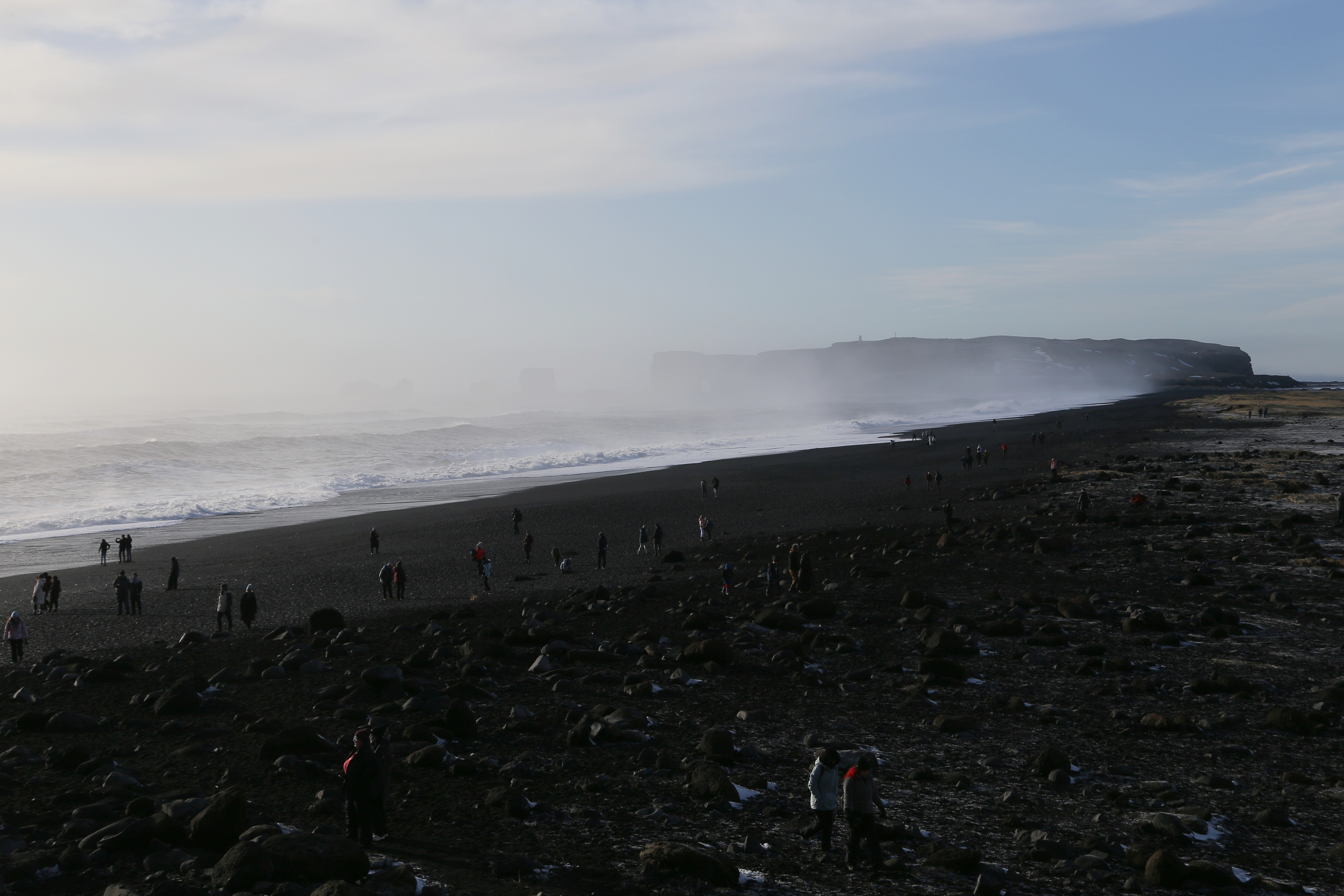
Reynisfjara Beach, looking west towards Dyrhólaey

Reynisfjara is a popular black sand beach in southern Iceland near the town of Vík í Mýrdal. It is part of the Katla UNESCO Global Geopark on privately owned land. In February 2026, following weeks of strong waves and easterly winds, part of the iconic basalt columns collapsed along with significant erosion of the beach. With the return of westerly winds in March, Reynisfjara is expected to return to its familiar appearance.

Hálsanefshellir Cave with its basalt columns is located at the eastern end of the beach, and in the west is Dyrhólaey promontory. The Reynisdrangar Sea Stacks are also located here. Eyjafjallajökull volcano is visible from the beach.

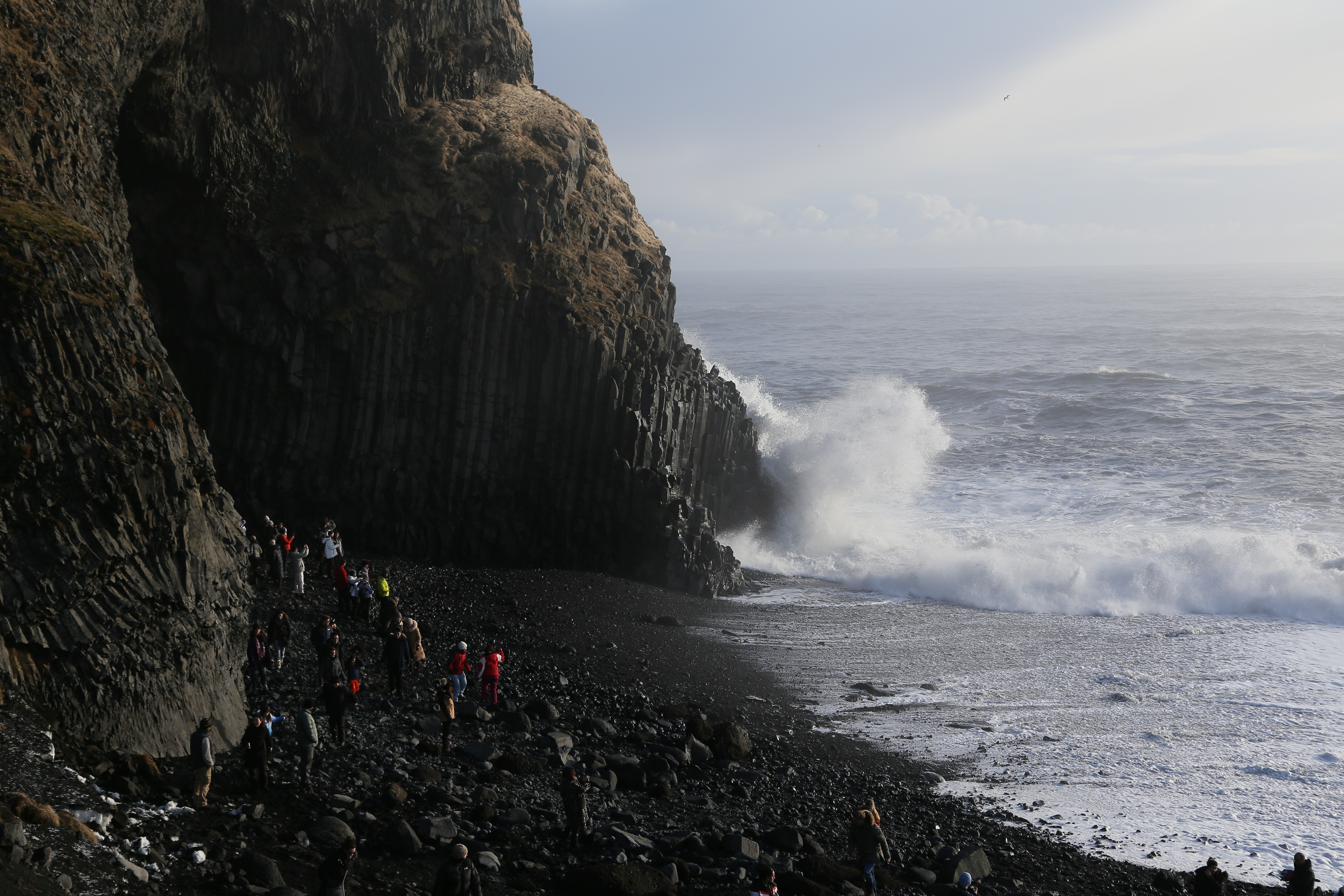
Hálsanefshellir Cave at Reynisfjara Beach, with Basalt Columns visible.

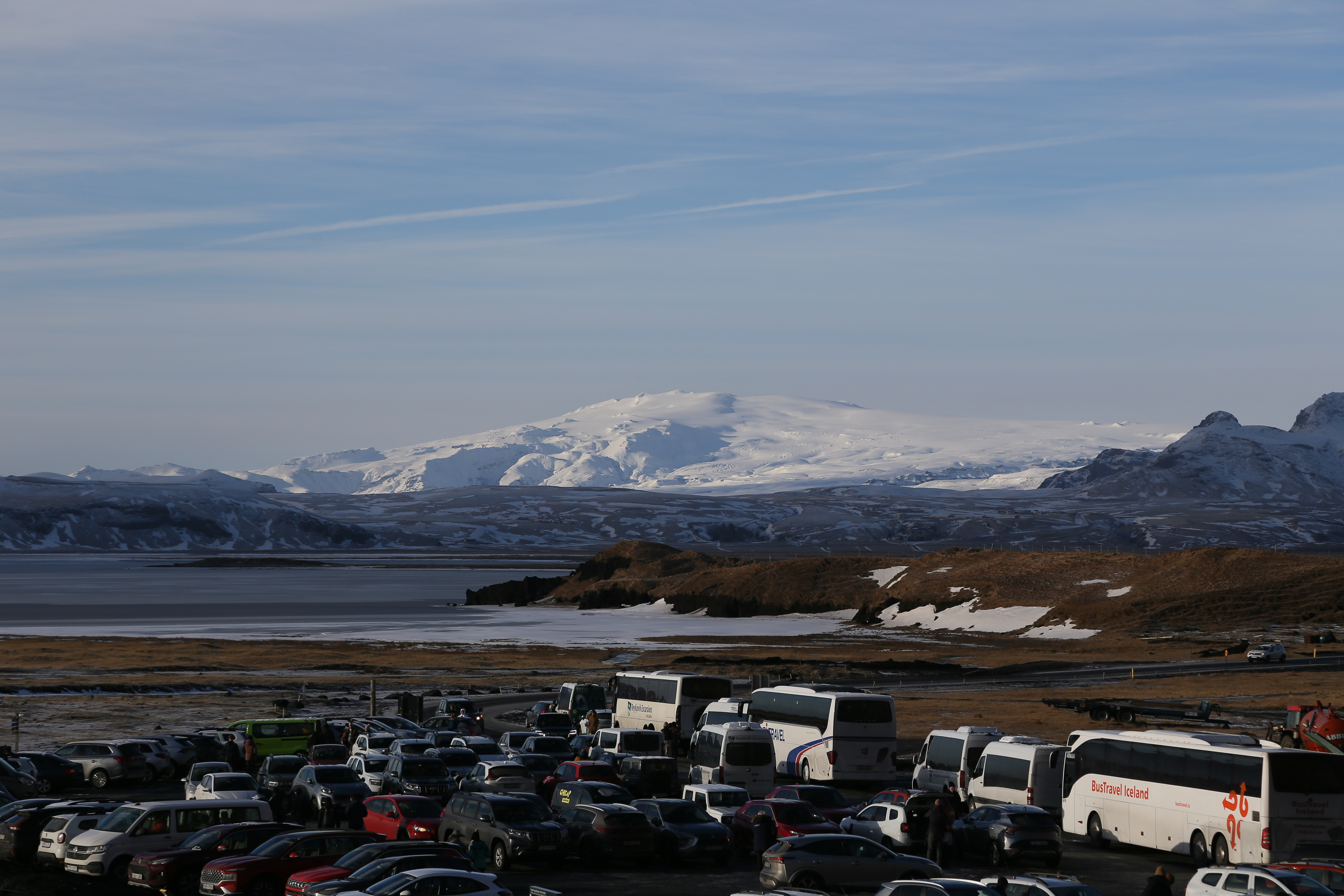
Eyjafjallajökull Volcano seen from Reynisfjara Beach

== Safety concerns ==
Conditions on the beach vary greatly and can change quickly.

Reynisfjara beach attracts large numbers of visitors year-round due to its striking black sand and dramatic basalt sea stacks, but it is also the site of unpredictable sneaker waves that can surge far inland without warning.

Because many tourists focus on photography and overlook hazard signage, these powerful waves—generated by the convergence of swell trains over a submerged offshore ledge—have led to at least twelve serious emergency rescues and five fatalities between 2007 and 2024.

A sixth fatality occurred in August 2025, with the victim succumbing after some time and before "... Coast Guard arrived - 30 to 40 minutes after..." being swept out from the Hálsanefshellir Cave by waves. The two preceding fatalities also occurred in the same location; following this incident during Yellow Warning conditions, the cave and basalt columns are to be closed during Red Warnings at the Beach. There has been a call to adjust the criteria for the Warnings.

== Safety measures ==
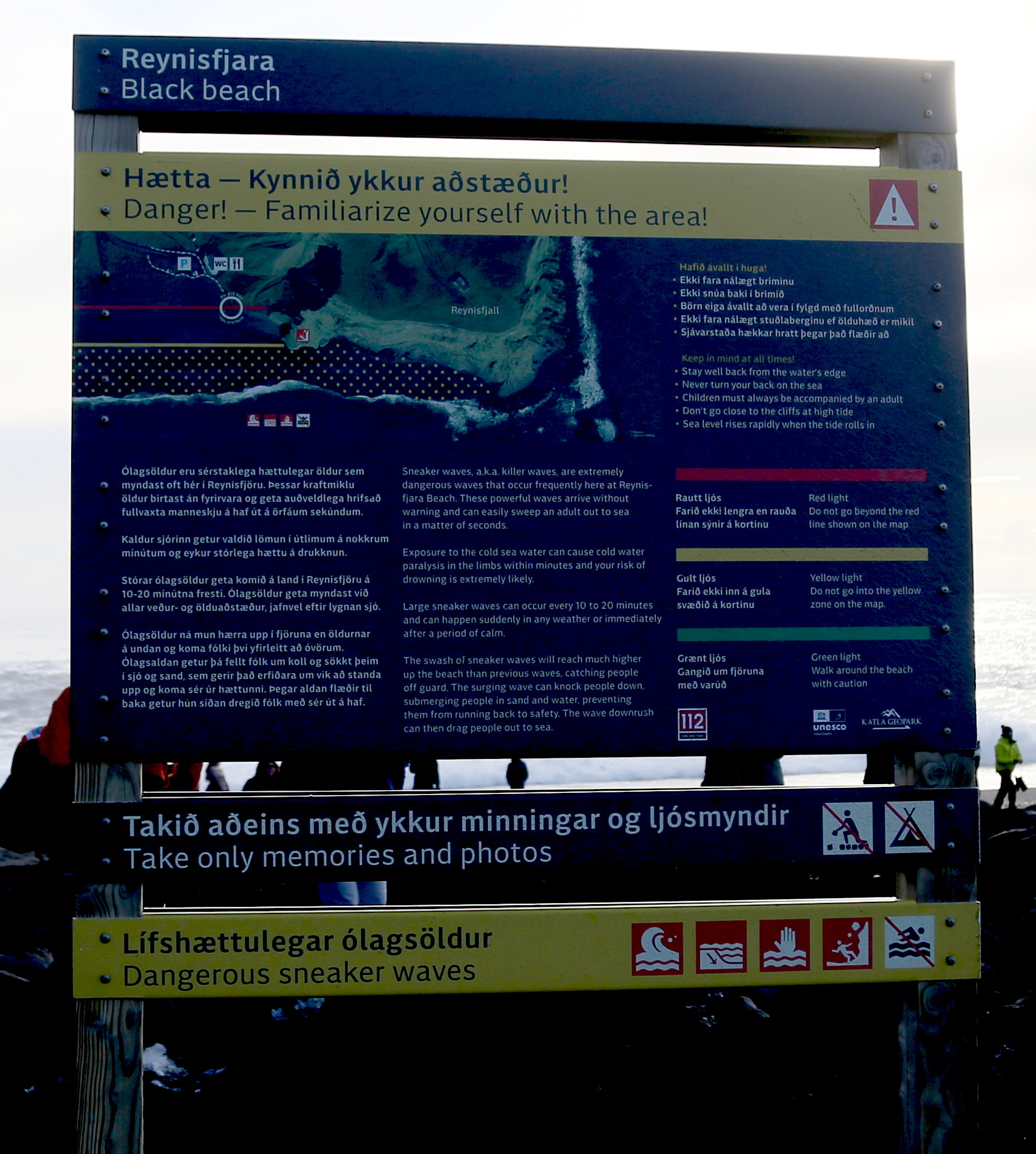
Reynisfjara Beach Hazards Signage

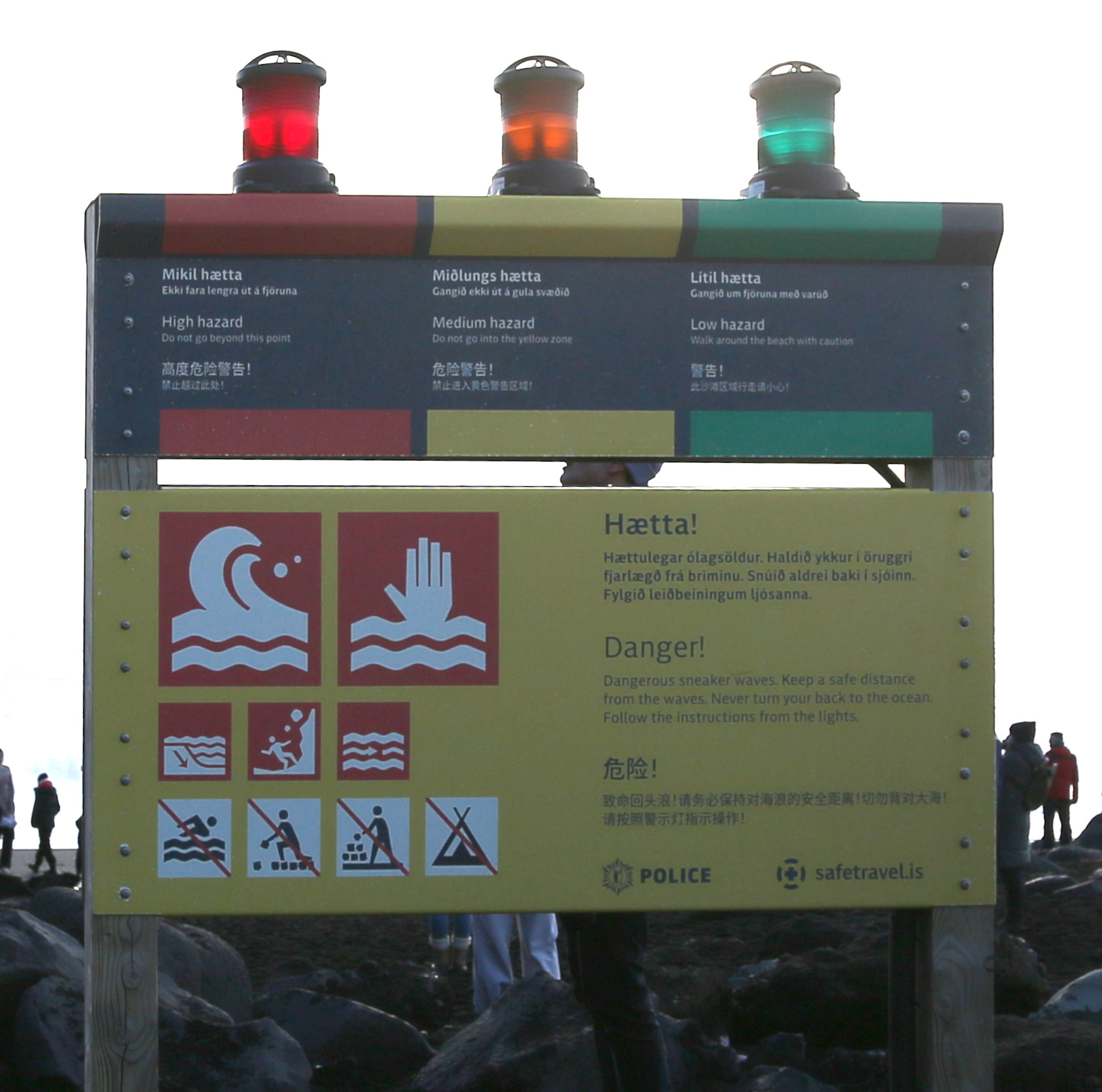
Reynisfjara Beach Hazard System

In response to the ongoing risk, Icelandic authorities and local stakeholders have proposed and begun implementing a suite of interventions.

The beach has a warning system with condition-dependent safety zones for cautioning visitors during hazardous conditions, such as sneaker waves. This system was installed following fatal accidents.

Safety measures include the placement of highly visible, multilingual warning signs with pictograms; the development of a real-time wave-forecasting system linked to warning lights; and the consideration of daily visitor allowances and nominal entrance fees to fund safety infrastructure. Enhanced coordination between the Icelandic Association for Search and Rescue, the Icelandic Road and Coastal Administration and tourism operators aims to improve hazard information via social media, guide books and on-site personnel, thereby raising awareness of sneaker wave dangers while encouraging more sustainable patterns of visitation.

After a fatal incident in August 2025, the Hálsanefshellir Cave and basalt columns are to be closed during red warnings at the beach. In February 2026, Minister of Industries Hanna Katrín Friðriksson foreshadowed new legislation to address safety at popular tourist sites, including Reynisfjara.
