= Salmon Cove Sands =

Provincial park in Newfoundland and Labrador, Canada

Coordinates: 47°46′54.45″N 53°9′22.92″W

Salmon Cove Sands is a provincial park in the Newfoundland and Labrador province of Canada. It is located on Conception Bay in the southeast of the island of Newfoundland where the Salmon Cove River enters Salmon Cove. The majority of the park is a wide beach with gray to black sand. It is surrounded in part by high cliffs. The park lies within the Salmon Cove municipality. Usage fees apply.

Amenities at the park include a parking area, canteen (food shack), and picnic tables. There are no campsites. There is a 487 metre long boardwalk along a portion of the river. Swimming is available in the Salmon Cove River or the cove itself; however, the use of flotation devices is prohibited in the ocean due to strong currents.

The Salmon Cove River which carries the sand down to the beach, originates above Beaver Pond, flows down through Forest Pond and Salmon Cove Pond, then through Harry's Pond to the cove.

In 2021 the park was closed to swimming due to fish die-off in Salmon Cove River and associated ponds, possibly caused by a blue-green algae infestation. The park had been closed in 2000 for a similar cause.
