= Richardson (given name) =

Richardson is a masculine given name borne by:

- Richardson Clover (1846–1919), United States rear admiral and director of naval intelligence
- Richardson Dilworth, mayor of Philadelphia (1956–1962)
- Richardson Hitchins (born 1997), American boxer
- Richardson Pack (1682–1728), English military officer and writer
- Richardson Pratt Jr (1923–2001), president of the Pratt Institute
- Richardson Viano (born 2002), French-Haitian alpine skier
- Richardson (footballer, born 1976), Brazilian footballer Richardson Oliveira dos Santos
- Richardson (footballer, born 1991), Brazilian footballer Richardson Fernandes dos Santos
- Richardson (footballer, born 1992), Brazilian footballer Richardson Jussier Medeiros Cabral
