= Richardson Building =

Richardson Building may refer to:

in Canada

- Richardson Building (Winnipeg)

in New Zealand

- Richardson Building (University of Otago), a building of the University of Otago in Dunedin which houses the University of Otago Faculty of Law

in the United States

- Richardson Block, Boston, Massachusetts, listed on the National Register of Historic Places (NRHP) in Massachusetts
- Richardson Building (Union City, Oklahoma), listed on the NRHP in Oklahoma
