= Gridley Street Historic District =

Historic district in Massachusetts, United States

- U.S. National Register of Historic Places
- U.S. Historic district
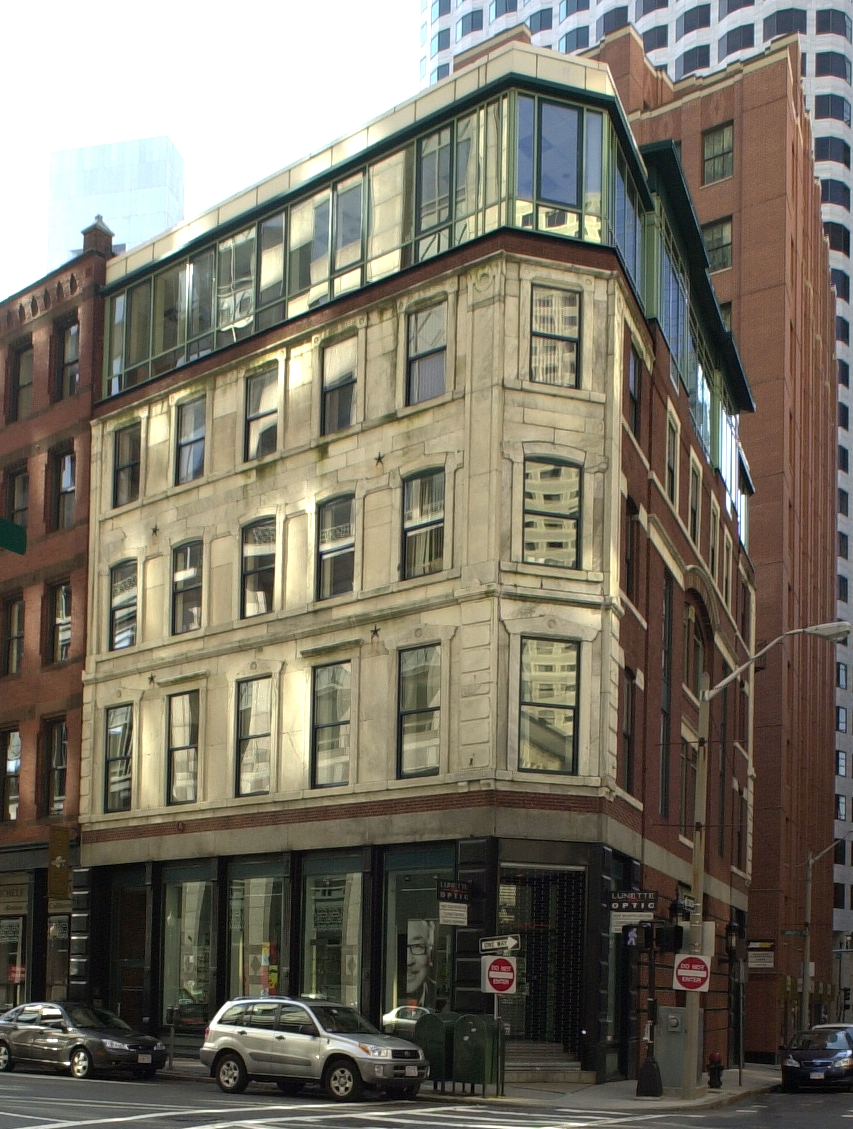
- The Richardson Block

- Location within Boston Location within Massachusetts Location within the United States
- Location: Boston, Massachusetts
- Coordinates: 42°21′17″N 71°3′14″W
- Architect: Multiple
- NRHP reference No.: 14000974
- Added to NRHP: December 3, 2014

The Gridley Street Historic District is a one-square-block commercial historic district on the edge of the Financial District of Boston, Massachusetts. It is bounded by High, Pearl, Purchase and Congress Streets, and was developed in the aftermath of the Great Boston Fire of 1872. The district includes the previously-listed Richardson Block, as well as the Henry Willis Building (169-177 Purchase Street), both built immediately after the fire, as well as the Western Union Building (a 1930 Art Deco high-rise), and the Bradley and Woodruff Block, a Romanesque Revival structure. The moderate scale of these buildings (which are dwarfed by the modern skyscrapers of adjacent blocks) typifies the post-fire development period.

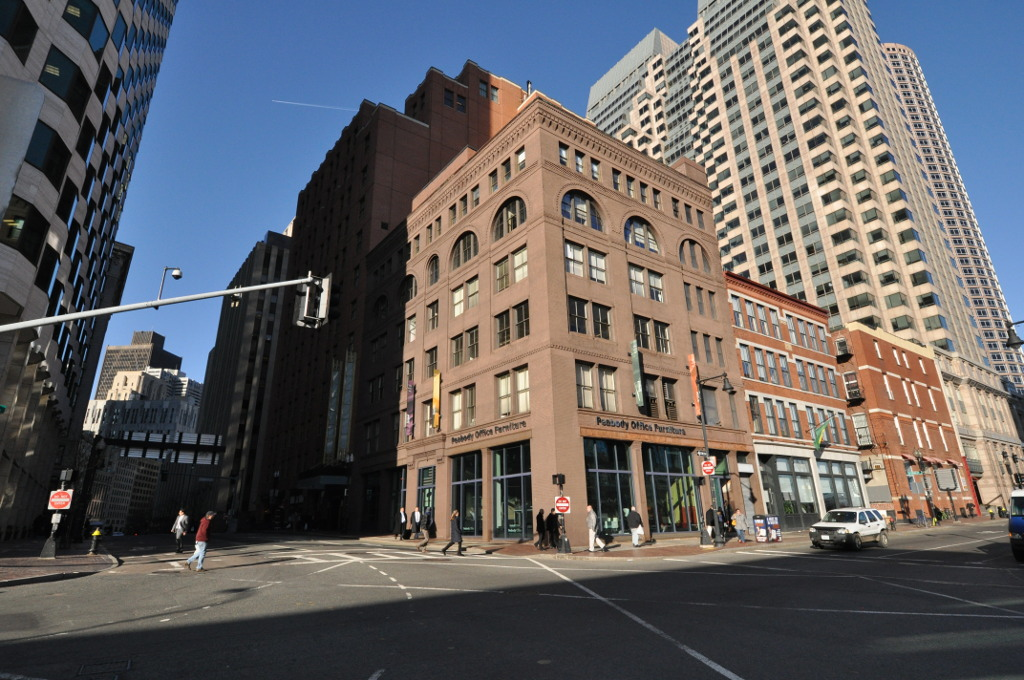
Most of the buildings other than the Richardson Block

The district was added to the National Register of Historic Places in 2014.

== See also ==
- National Register of Historic Places listings in northern Boston, Massachusetts
