= Richardson Block =

- U.S. National Register of Historic Places
- U.S. Historic district – Contributing property
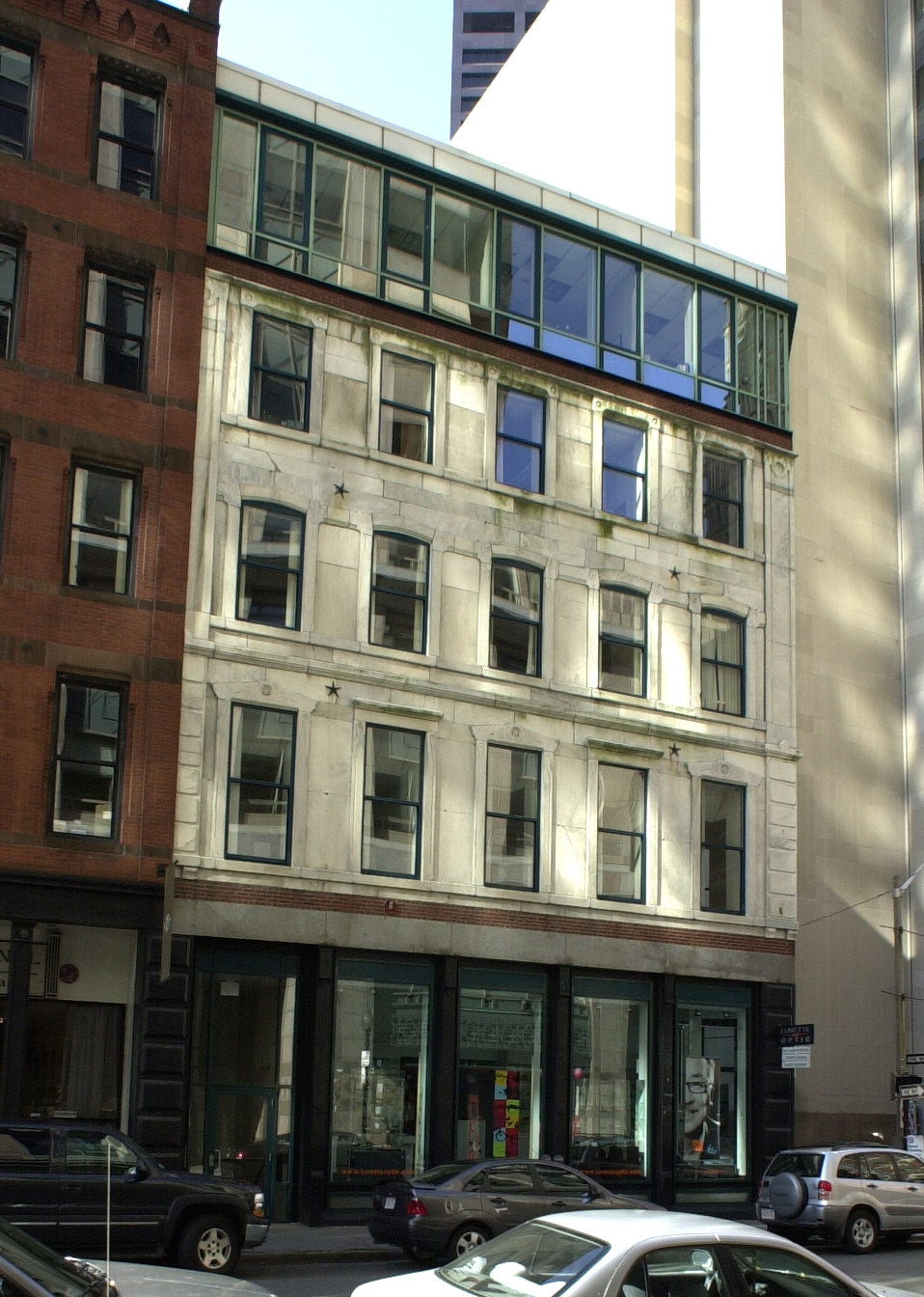

- Location within Boston Location within Massachusetts Location within the United States
- Location: 113-151 Pearl and 109-119 High Sts., Boston, Massachusetts
- Coordinates: 42°21′18.3″N 71°3′14.5″W
- Area: less than one acre
- Built: 1873
- Architect: William G. Preston; George W. Pope
- Architectural style: Neo-Grec
- Part of: Gridley Street Historic District (ID14000974)
- NRHP reference No.: 86001504

Significant dates
- Added to NRHP: August 09, 1986
- Designated CP: December 3, 2014

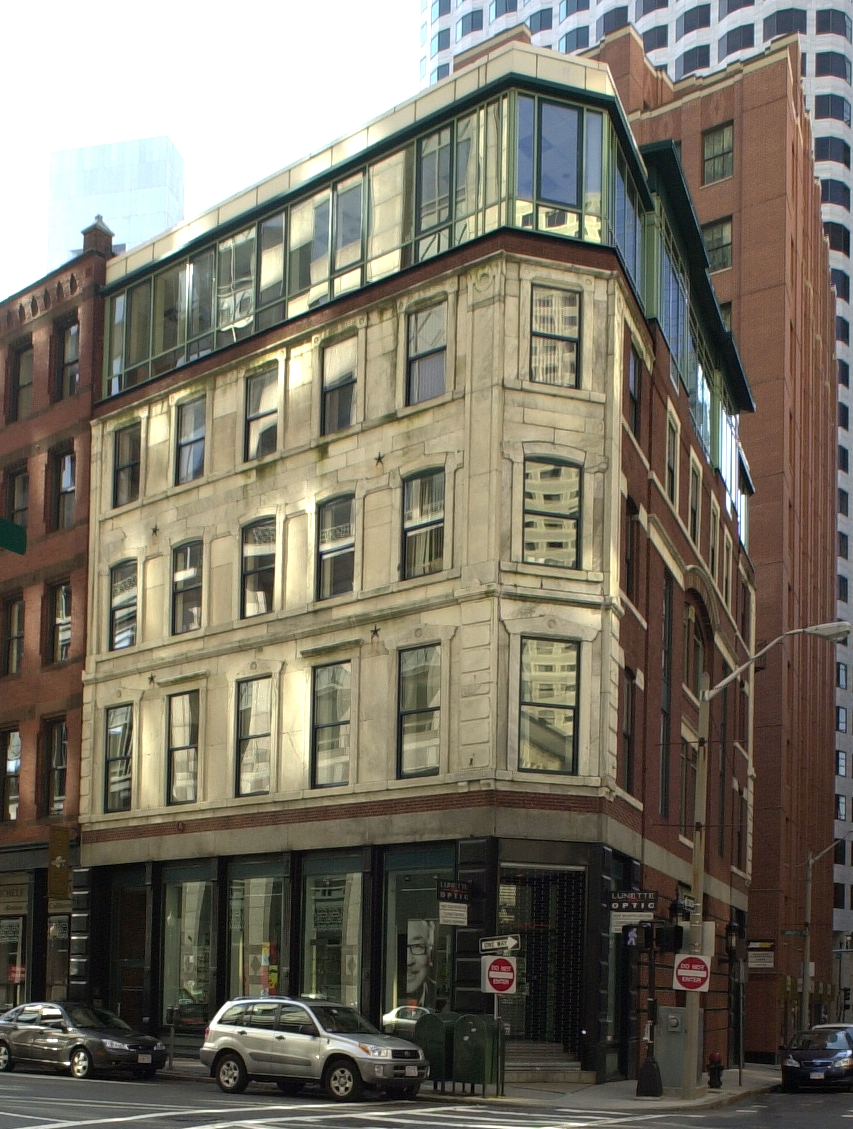

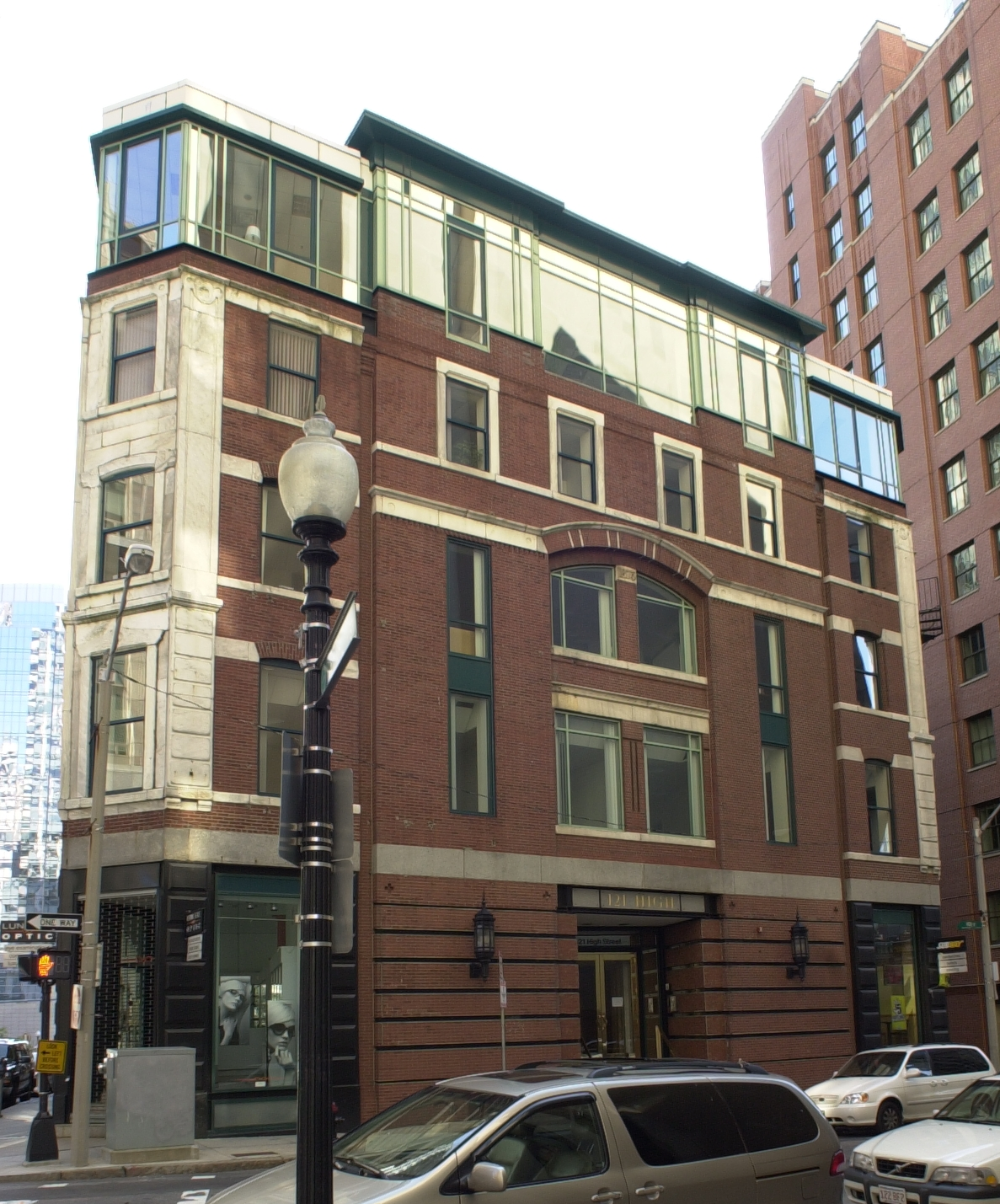

The Richardson Block is a historic block of commercial buildings at 113-151 Pearl and 109-119 High Streets in Boston, Massachusetts. It consists of a series of buildings constructed in the aftermath of the Great Boston Fire of 1872. The first of these buildings, at the corner of Pearl and High Streets, was designed by William Preston and built in 1873 for Jeffrey Richardson, using granite and brick salvaged from buildings that had previously stood on the site. The area was an important locus of the leather goods business both before and after the fire, and the buildings constructed after the fire are among the only neo-Greek commercial structures standing in Boston's Financial District.

The properties were listed on the National Register of Historic Places in 1986. They are currently under consideration for Boston Landmark status by the Boston Landmarks Commission.

== See also ==
- National Register of Historic Places listings in northern Boston, Massachusetts
