= Richardson Beach =

Beach in Hawaii, United States

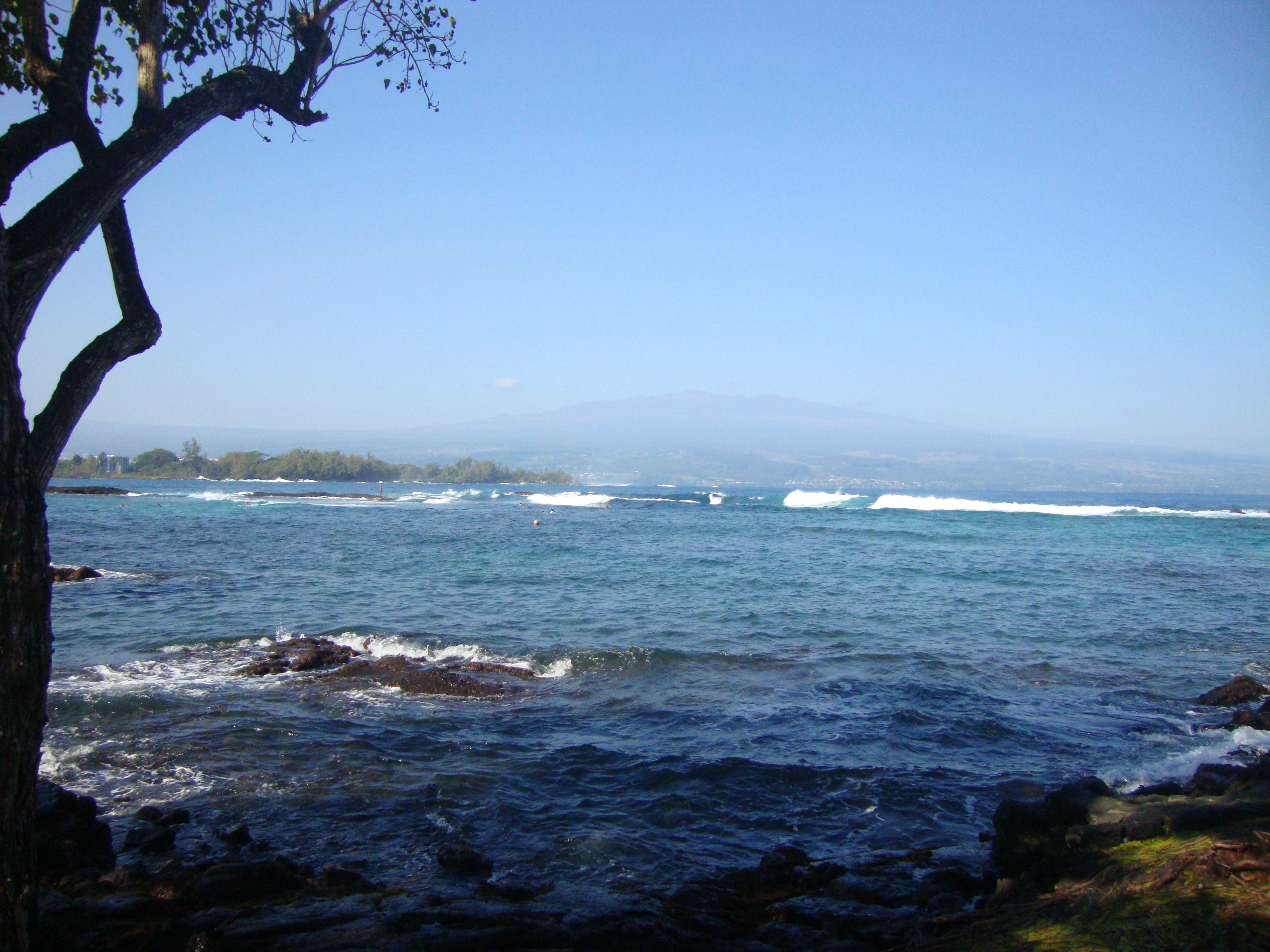
Richardson Beach Park

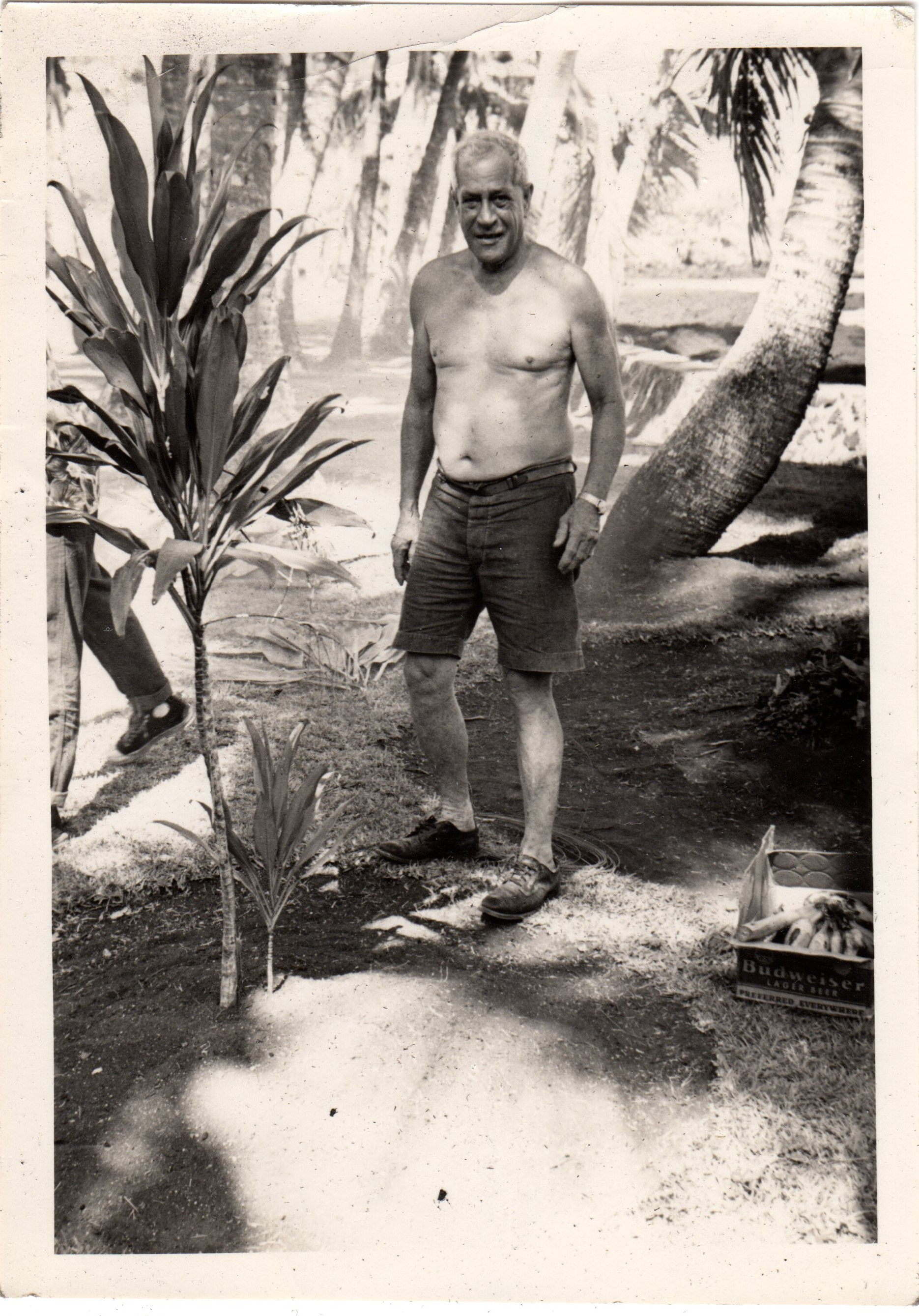
George Richardson at his home circa 1951

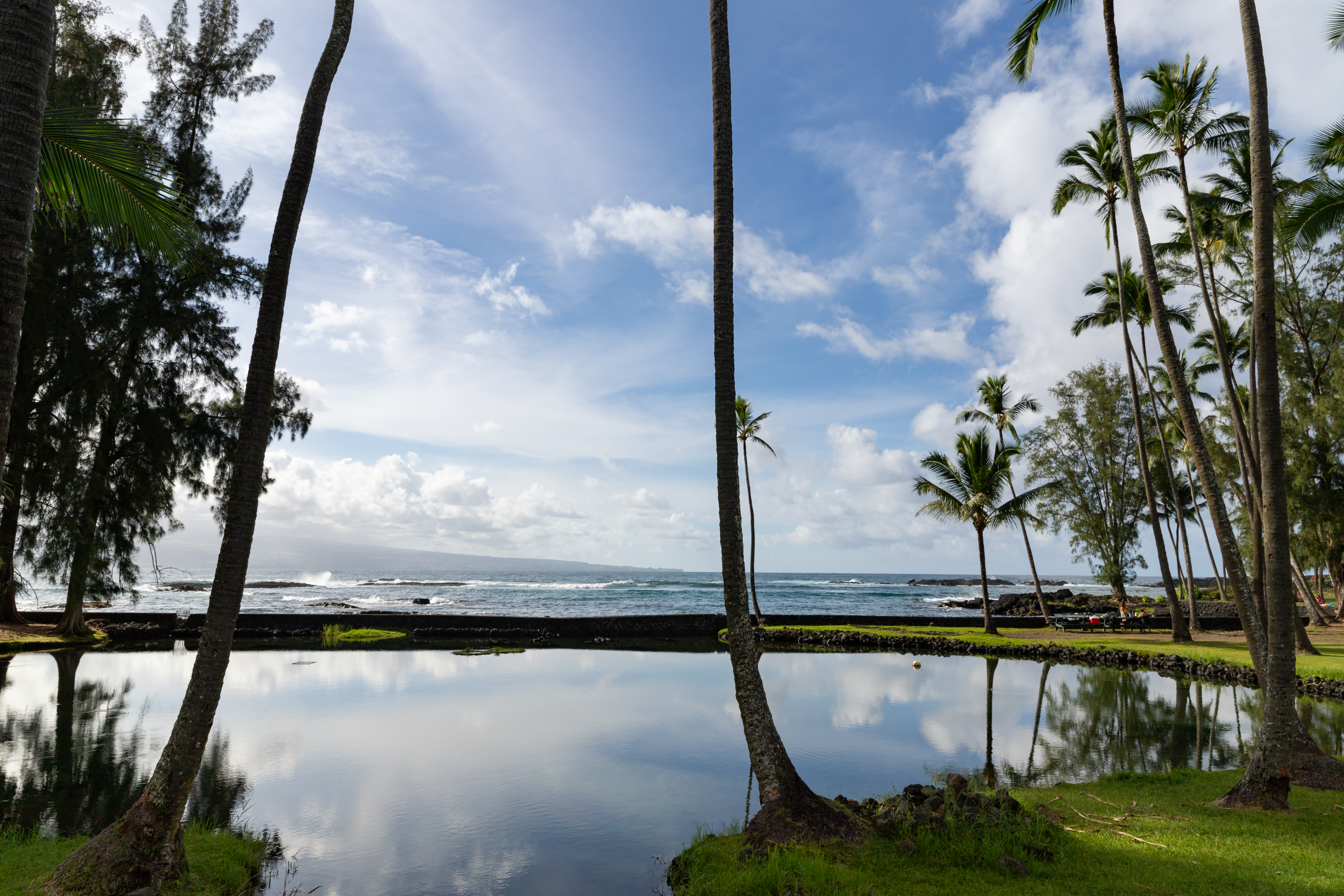
Richardson Beach Park in Hilo, Big island, Hawaii

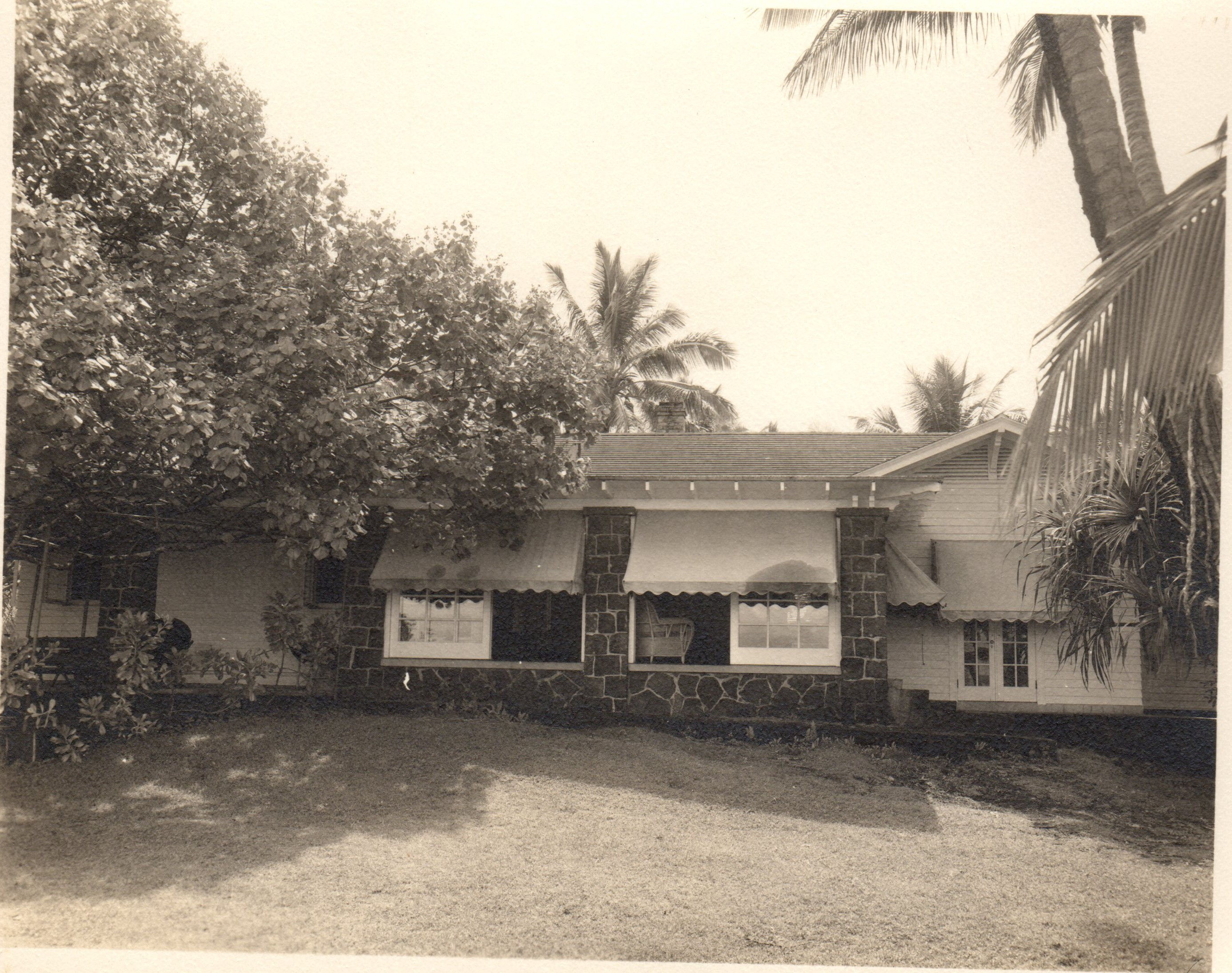
Richardson home prior to its renovation as the Richardson Ocean Center. Note the large windows designed to allow water to pass through the home.

Richardson Beach (also known as Richardson Ocean Park) is a Hawaii County park located just east of Hilo, Hawaii, on the Big Island of Hawaii. Adjacent is the Lele'iwi Beach Park.

== History ==
The name Richardson comes from its original owners, Elsa and George Richardson, whose home still stands there. George Richardson was the former Chief Detective of the County of Hawaii, and a descendant of Kekuiapoiwa, mother of Kamehameha I, and her second husband Kamanawa, received the land as a gift of gratitude from the Malo family. In 1920, when the entire Malo family was stricken with typhoid fever, Elena, the least severely afflicted of them all, walked to the home of George Richardson on Reeds Bay to seek help.

Richardson, a part-Hawaiian originally from Kohala, regularly fished up and down the Keaukaha coastline in his boat and had become a close friend of David Malo's. When Elena showed up on his doorstep with the terrible news, he immediately put her on board his boat, the fastest means of transportation then available, and returned to the Malo home. There he gathered up the rest of the family and headed for Hilo and the hospital. In spite of these valiant efforts, two of the children died.

After the family returned home to convalesce, Richardson continued to look in on them and see to their welfare by bringing medicine and other necessities. Malo felt deeply indebted to Richardson, believing that without his help he might have lost his entire family. When he was fully recovered, Malo suggested that Richardson build a home on the Malo property if he wished, and that he consider the land as his own. Richardson accepted the offer, and in the early 1920s constructed a large house on the property. Malo helped design the structure, recommending the large doors at the front and back of the house to provide a corridor for the periodic inundations by high winter surf and tsunami. This plan did actually save the building on a number of occasions when the ocean flooded through the house rather than carrying it away.

== Location ==
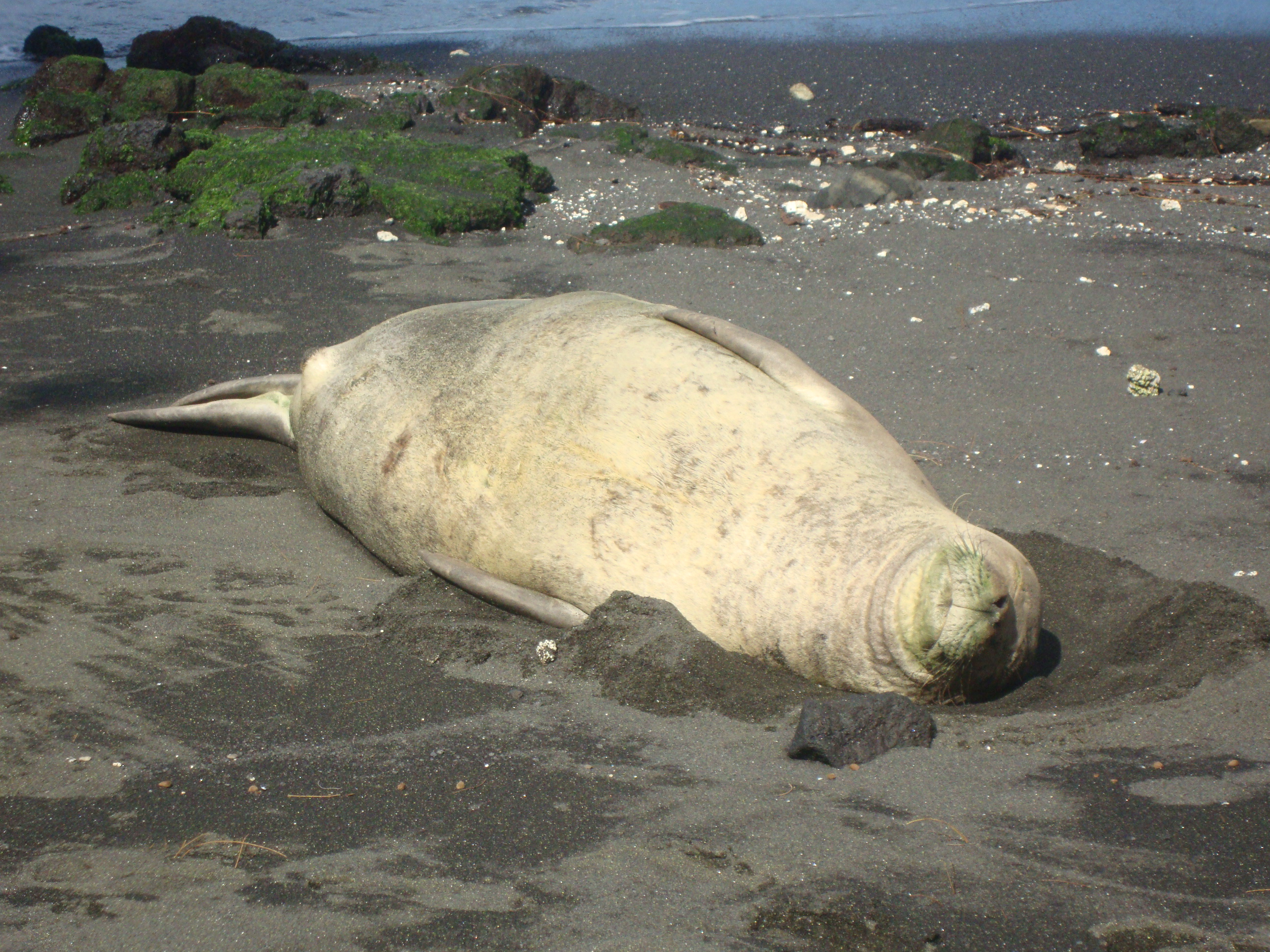
Monk Seal at Richardson Beach

Today the beach is a public park, and the home is occupied and operated as the Richardson Ocean Center.

Richardson Beach is the only beach in the Hilo area with black sand and green sand. Monk Seals and turtles frequent this area as well.

It is located near the end of Kalanianaʻole Avenue at coordinates 19°44′5″N 155°0′49″W, where Leleiwi Street leads to an undeveloped coastal access area known as Lehia Park.

== The House ==
The home at Richardson Beach, locally known simply as "Richardson's", is listed in the Library of Congress Historic American Buildings Survey . the survey notes: "The George and Elsa Richardson House is a distinctive property that combines traditional architectural forms and locally available materials and landscaping. This gracious former residential estate, known today as Richardson Ocean Park, recalls old Hawaii with its Craftsman-style detailing and lava rock columns and foundation walls. Its striking shoreline landscape fronting the Pacific Ocean is defined by a meandering coconut grove, hau trees, tropical plantings, a swimming cove, fishponds, anchialine pools, and sea walls. The house has withstood several tidal waves intact, a testament to its solid frame construction and well-built basalt masonry features. The building's twelve lava rock columns (suggested by some as the residence's 'protectors') and the careful placement within the coastal property are acknowledged as other factors owing to its resilience. This former residence retains important characteristics of its original design, and strongly conveys the distinctive nature of the estate's original 1926 appearance."
