= Richardson (1919 cyclecar) =

For the pre World war I British Richardson cyclecar made in Lincolnshire see Richardson (1903 cyclecar).

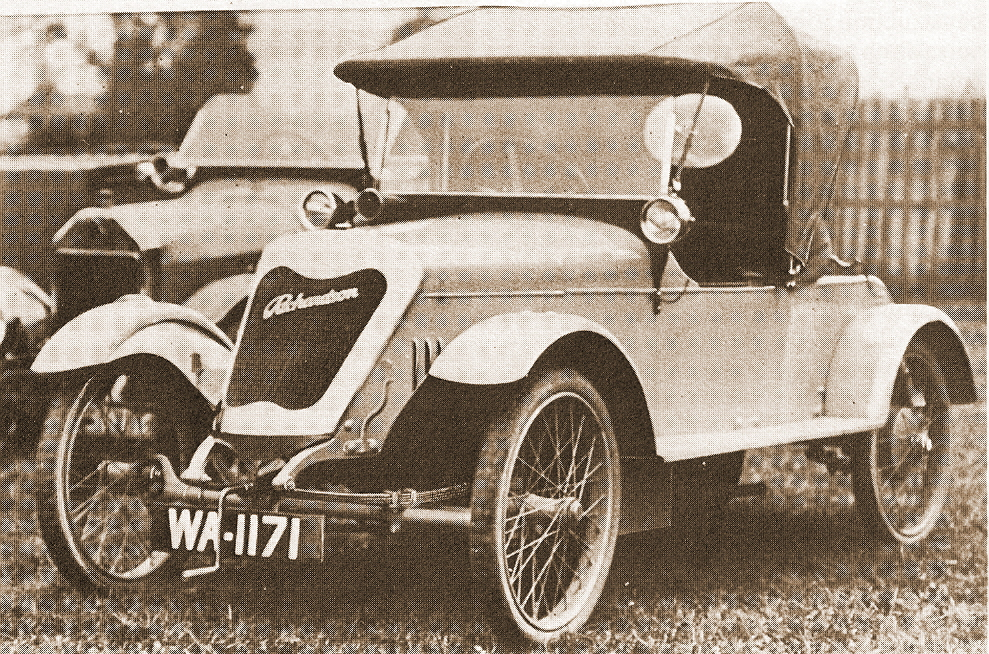
1920 Richardson

The Richardson was a British cyclecar manufactured by C. E. Richardson of Finbat Works, Aizlewood Road, Sheffield, between 1919 and 1921.

Before World War I Richardsons had made children's toys and scooters and were pioneer makers of model aircraft. During the war they had switched production to munitions. With peace it was decided to branch out into cyclecar manufacture and a car was designed by Albert Clarke, the brother-in-law of Charles Richardson.

The car was powered by a V-twin, air-cooled engine with a choice of 980 cc JAP or 1090 cc Precision types. Both power units drove through a friction drive and belt to the rear axle. Later models used a chain drive.

Early cars had an acutely sloped dummy radiator, but this changed to a more stylish vertical design in 1921.

It is thought that around 500 cars were made before production stopped in 1921.

== See also ==
- List of car manufacturers of the United Kingdom
