= Richardson (1903 cyclecar) =

For the later 1920s British Richardson cyclcar made in Sheffield see Richardson (1919 cyclecar).

The Richardson was a British cyclecar manufactured by J. R. Richardson of Saxilby, Lincolnshire, between 1903 and 1907.

Three versions of the car were produced with 6.5 hp single, 12/14 hp twin or 18/20 hp four cylinder engines. The two larger cars had four speed gearboxes and they all had shaft drive.

Mr Richardson was also a manager at the French MASS car company and it is possible that the Richardson cars were actually re-badges MASS vehicles.

== See also ==
- List of car manufacturers of the United Kingdom
