= Richardson Lake =

Lake in the state of Minnesota, United States

- Location within Minnesota
- Location: Meeker County, Minnesota
- Coordinates: 45°9′31″N 94°26′20″W
- Type: lake

Richardson Lake is a lake in Meeker County, in the U.S. state of Minnesota.

Richardson Lake was named for William Richardson, a pioneer who settled there.

== See also ==
- List of lakes in Minnesota
