= Richardson (footballer, born 1992) =

Brazilian footballer

Personal information
- Full name: Richardson Jussier Medeiros Cabral
- Date of birth: 21 May 1992 (age 34)
- Place of birth: Natal, Brazil
- Height: 1.83 m (6 ft 0 in)
- Position: Centre-back

Team information
- Current team: Capital-DF

Youth career
- –2010: Desportivo Brasil
- 2011–2012: Grêmio

Senior career*
Years	Team	Apps	(Gls)
2013	Santa Cruz (N)	1	(0)
2014	Grêmio Anápolis	11	(0)
2015	Dom Bosco		
2015	Santa Cruz (N)		
2016–2018	América de Natal	46	(3)
2018	Alecrim	6	(0)
2019	Campinense	21	(0)
2019–2020	ABC	38	(2)
2020–2021	Ferroviário	37	(1)
2022–2024	ABC	111	(6)
2023	→ Náutico (loan)	5	(0)
2025–	Capital-DF	26	(4)
2025	→ ABC (loan)	7	(0)
- * Club domestic league appearances and goals as of 16 January 2025

Richardson Jussier Medeiros Cabral (born 21 May 1992), simply known as Richardson, is a Brazilian professional footballer who plays as a centre-back for Capital-DF.

== Career ==
Born in Natal, Rio Grande do Norte, Richardson worked in the youth sectors of Desportivo Brasil and Grêmio. Back in his hometown, he played for all the main teams in the city (América, Santa Cruz, Alecrim and ABC), standing out especially for ABC, where he became captain, leader and made more than 150 appearances in total.

For the 2025 season, Richardson signed with Capital-DF. In July, after Capital's elimination from the 2025 Campeonato Brasileiro Série D, Richardson returned to ABC on loan.

== Honours ==
ABC

- Campeonato Potiguar: 2020, 2022

Ferroviário

- Copa Fares Lopes: 2020
