= Playa Negra, Costa Rica =

Beach in Guanacaste, Costa Rica

Playa Negra
- Town
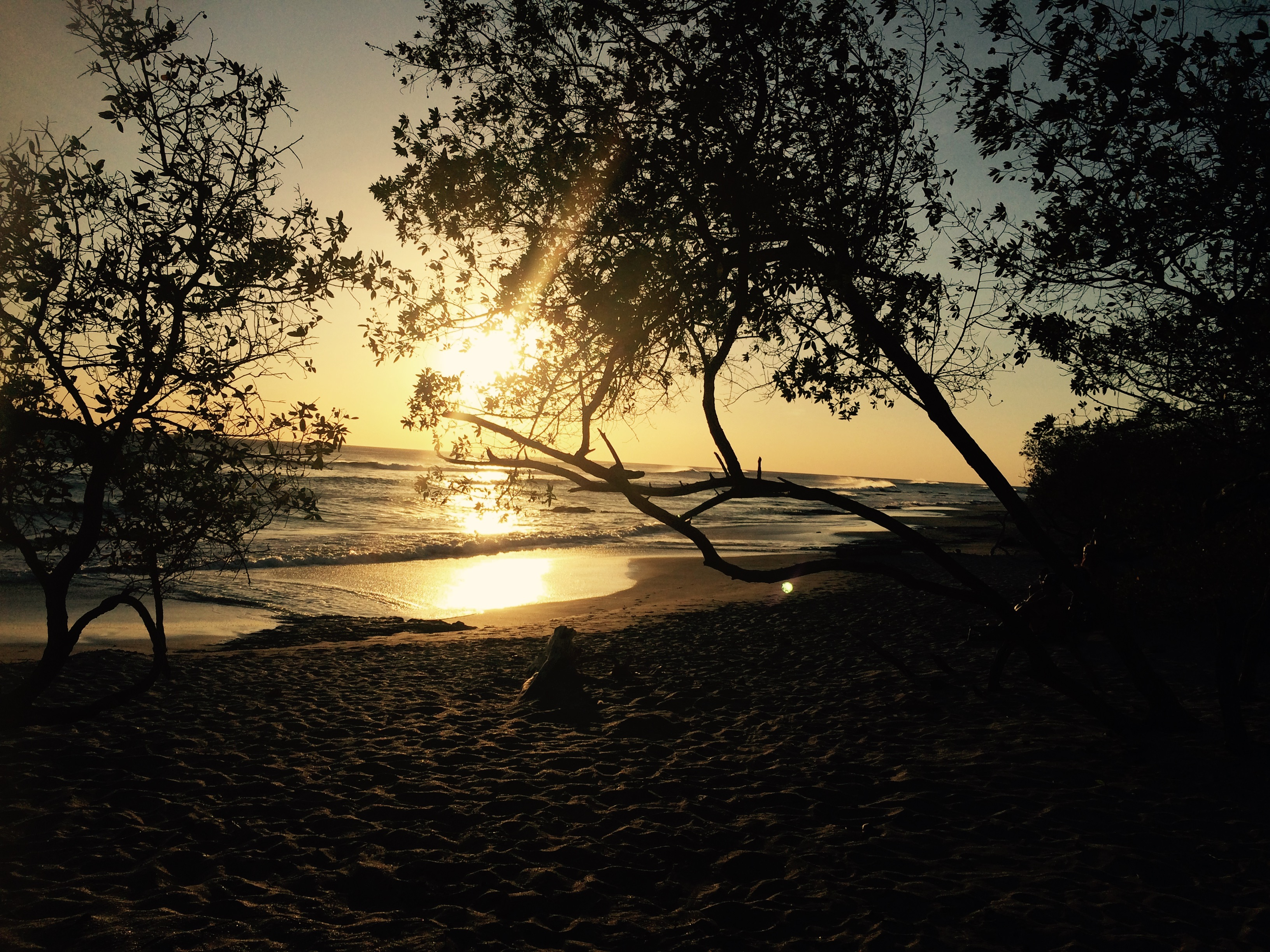
- Playa Negra, Costa Rica

- Location in Costa Rica
- Country: Costa Rica
- Province: Guanacaste
- Canton: Santa Cruz
- Coordinates: 10°11′38″N 85°49′47″W
- Time zone: UTC-6 (Costa Rica Standard Time)

Playa Negra (Spanish for Black Beach) is a beach in the Pacific coast of Costa Rica. It is located in the town of Los Pargos in the Santa Cruz canton of Guanacaste Province. It is south of Tamarindo, San José de Pinilla, Avellanas and north of Marbella, Lagarto, Venado, and Junquillal. It is accessed from Santa Cruz through 27 de Abril and then Paraiso.

== Businesses and infrastructure ==
Los Pargos the town closest to Playa Negra offers several restaurants, from the now famous Peruvian food at Cafe Playa Negra, French cuisine at Villa DeVeena, Mexican food at Jalapeño Taco Grill, a pizza parlour known as La Vida Buena, organic food from Cafe La Ventana, a coffee/breakfast/lunch shop called Cafe Corazón, and a beachfront restaurant at the Hotel Playa Negra among others. There is an art gallery called Johnny Manana's Surf Art Gallery & Studio next door to Cafe La Ventana. There are also a few private homes in the commercial centre of the town as well as the many homes dotted on the beaches and in residential communities. There is a mini market right across from the street from the Cafe Playa Negra with very basic amenities, and one at the entrance of the town called Las Tecas and now a third in near the soccer field. There is also a private skate park called El Mutante, an attorney's office and real estate office. There are several small shops, shops for surfing-related souvenirs, surf camp, surf rentals, ding repair shop, yoga centres, a Pentecostal church, Jiu Jitsu centre, and various cabinas and hotels.

Los Pargos has developed to be a growing town with many outdoors activities that include two adventure tours shops, one at each end of town.

The infrastructure in Los Pargos has changed considerably over the last years. Culverts were added to all the creek beds. Bridges have been built over the rivers. There were 7 metres of rock base added to the road in 2010. The previous ensure that the area roads stay passable through most of the year. Los Pargos also has internet serviced by a Fiber-optic network with the potential for download speeds of up to 200 Mbit/s. There is telephone and some 3G cellular signal from ICE/Kolbi and MoviStar. The entire town is serviced by electricity. Water comes from individual artesian wells on each property. However, a public water system was installed and services nearly all the homes and businesses.

== Surf ==
Playa Negra is home to the surfing break known worldwide since being featured in Bruce Brown's film Endless Summer II. However, there are many accounts of individuals who surfed Playa Negra long before the movie came out. Some claim to have been here in the 1970s.

This beach is considered by many surfers to be one of the top spots in Costa Rica. It has become famous in part to its ease of access apart from its quality as a surfing wave. Playa Negra has a rock reef bottom with good right-hand barrels and a well defined channel for paddling out. This channel also assists surfers to return to the point where the wave breaks. There is a strong rip current that takes the surfers back through the impact zone. Depending on the swell direction and tides a left breaking wave may also be surfed. The break has good exposure to both Northern and Southern Hemisphere swells and is reasonably consistent year-round. The wave can break well with large and small swells. The 2012 Costa Rica earthquake lifted up the entire plate which caused the wave to have better form on higher tides in combination with smaller swells. It may also produce good surfing waves during the entire tide range. On a lower tide the wave breaks faster and hollower due to the earthquake.

== Nature and wildlife ==
Playa Negra is located in a tropical dry forest. There are six months of dry season and six months of wet season. The average rainfall is 1.8 to 2.4 metres annually. Some years, in the past 20 have had as little accumulation as 0.9 metres and as much as 4.2 metres. The dry season is from November to May and the wet from May to October.

There are myriad tropical terrestrial species of animals that live in this zone including the mantled howler monkey, white-nosed coati, variegated squirrel, danta, ocelot, white-tailed deer, and jaguarundi among others. There are also myriad species of oceanic animals that come to this beach including the humpback whale, roosterfish, Pacific dogtooth snapper, mahi-mahi, sailfish, skipjack tuna, dolphins, yellowfin tuna, snook, sailfish, marlin, and the green sea turtle.

There have been over 700 insect species and over 200 bird species officially recorded in the area.
