= List of beaches in Hawaii =

This is a list of notable Hawaiian beaches sorted alphabetically by island, clockwise around each island, listed by beach name followed by location.

== Hawaiʻi Island (Big Island) ==
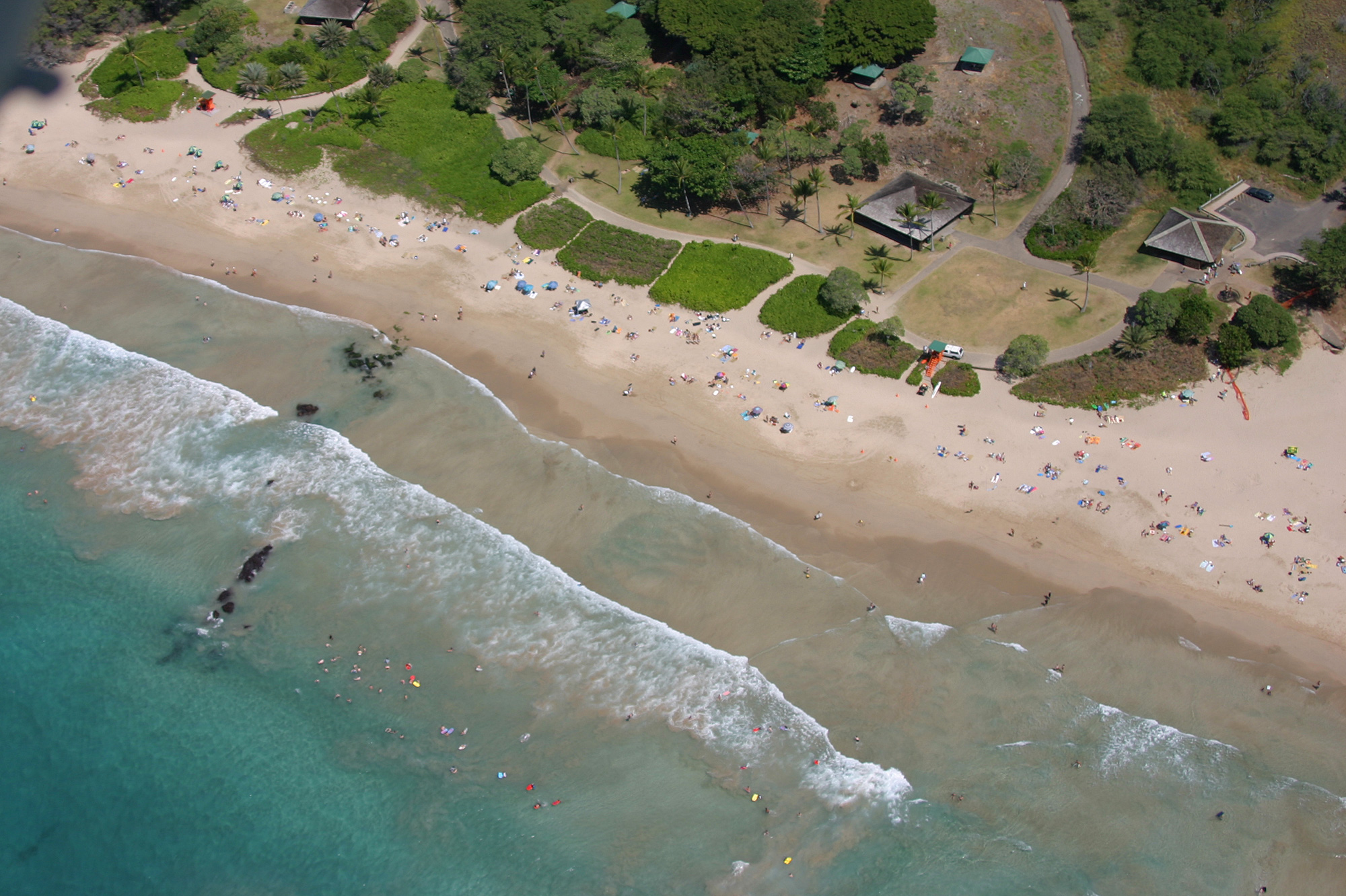
2005 aerial view of Hapuna Beach, Big Island

Beach	Location
Laupāhoehoe Point County Park	Hāmākua Coast
Hakalau	Hilo District
Kolekole Beach Park	Hilo District
Onomea	Hilo District
Honoliʻi Beach Park	Hilo District
Hilo Bayfront Park	Hilo
Coconut Island	Hilo
Reeds Bay Park	Hilo
Radio Bay	Hilo
Keaukaha Beach Park	Hilo
Onekahakaha Beach Park	Hilo
James Kealoha Beach	Hilo
Leleiwi Beach Park (Richardson)	
Lehia Park	Hilo District
Pāpaʻi	
Keaʻau	
Honolulu Landing	
Nānāwale Park	
Kahuwai	
Kumukahi	
Kapoho	
Isaac Hale Beach Park	Puna District
MacKenzie State Recreation Area	Puna District
Kehena	
Kaimū Beach Park	Covered by lava flow
Harry K. Brown Park	Covered by lava flow
Wahaʻula	Hawaiʻi Volcanoes National Park
ʻĀpua	Hawaiʻi Volcanoes National Park
Keauhou	Hawaiʻi Volcanoes National Park
Halapē	Hawaiʻi Volcanoes National Park
Kāluʻe	Hawaiʻi Volcanoes National Park
Kamehame	
Punaluʻu Beach Park	
Nīnole	
Kāwā	
Whittington Park	
Kaʻaluʻalu	
Kamilo Beach	Kaʻū District
Papakolea Beach (Green Sands Beach)	Kaʻū District
Ka Lae or South Point, via the Road to the Sea	Kaʻū District
Waiʻahukini	
Kaʻilikiʻi	
Puʻu Hou	
Pōhue	
Manukā	
Kapuʻā	
Honomalino	
Miloliʻi Beach park	
Hoʻokena Beach Park	South Kona District
Puʻuhonua o Hōnaunau Beach	
Keʻei	
Napōʻopoʻo Beach Park	Kealakekua Bay
Keauhou Bay	North Kona District
Mākoleʻā	
Kahaluʻu Bay Beach Park	
Laʻaloa Bay (Magic Sands or White Sands Beach Park)	
Pāhoehoe Beach Park	North Kona District
Holualoa Bay	North Kona District
Kamakahonu Beach	Kailua Pier, Kailua-Kona
Old Kona Airport State Recreation Area	Kailua-Kona
Papawai	
Honokōhau Bay	
Keāhole Point	(Kona International Airport)
Mahaiʻula	Kekaha Kai State Park
Makalawena	Kekaha Kai State Park
Maniniʻōwali	(Kua Bay, Kekaha Kai State Park)
Kūkiʻo Beach	
Kaʻūpūlehu	
Kīholo	
Keawaiki	
ʻAnaehoʻomalu Bay (Waikoloa Beach)	
Kalāhuipuaʻa	
Puakō	
Waialea (Beach 69)	
Hāpuna Beach State Recreation Area	
Kaunaʻoa Bay	
Samuel M. Spencer Beach Park	
Kawaihae Harbor	
Lapakahi State Historical Park	
Mahukona Beach Park	
Kapaʻa Park	
Kohala Historical Sites State Monument	
Kēōkea Beach Park	
Pololū	
Honokane Nui	
Honopuʻe	
Waimanu Valley	
Waipiʻo	

== Kauaʻi ==
Some of the beaches found in Kauaʻi are:

Beach	Location
Ahukini State Recreation Pier	Southeast shore
ʻAliomanu Beach	North shore
Anahola Beach Park	Anahola
Anini Beach	North shore
Baby Beach Poipu	East shore
Black Pot Beach Park	Hanalei
Brennecke Beach	South shore
Donkey Beach	East shore
Glass Beach (Eleele, Hawaii)	South shore
Fuji Beach	Kapaa – East Side
Hāʻena State Park	Haena – North Shore
Hanakapiai Beach	
Hanalei Pavilion Beach Park	Hanalei – North Shore
Hanalei Pier	Hanalei – North Shore
Hanamāʻulu Beach Park	Hanamāʻulu (East shore)
Hanapēpē Beach Park	
Haʻula Beach	Southeast shore
Hideaway Beach	Princeville – North Shore
Honopu Beach	
Kiahuna Beach	Poipu – South Shore
Kāhili Quarry Beach	North shore
Kalāheo	South shore
Kalalau Beach	
Kalapakī Beach	East shore
Kalihiwai Beach	Kilauea – North Shore
Kapaʻa Beach Park	Kapaʻa (East shore)
Kauapea Beach (Secret Beach)	Kīlauea
Kealia Beach	Kealia – East Side
Ke`e Beach	Haena – North Shore
Kekaha Beach Park	Kekaha – West Side
Kepuhi Beach	North shore
Kīkīaola Small Boat Harbor	
Kīlauea Point National Wildlife Refuge	Kīlauea
Kīpū Kai	South Shore
Kōloa Landing	South shore
Kukuʻula Small Boat Harbor	
Larsens Beach	North shore
Lawaʻi Beach	Poipu – South Shore
Lāwaʻi Kai	
Lucy Wright Beach Park	West shore
Lumaha'i Beach	Hanalei – North Shore
Lydgate State Park	Wailua – East Side
Mahaulepu Beach	Poipu – South Shore
Miloliʻi Beach	
Moloaʻa Bay	North shore
Nā Pali Coast State Park	West coast
Nawiliwili Beach Park	
Niumalu Beach Park	East shore
Nuʻalolo Kai Beach	
Nukoliʻi Beach Park	East shore
Pacific Missile Range Facility	West shore
Pākalā Beach	West shore
Pālama Beach	South shore
Pali Ke Kua (Hideaways)	Princeville
Pāpaʻa Bay	North shore
Pīlaʻa Beach	North shore
Poipu Beach Park	Poipu – South Shore
Polihale State Park	Kekaha – West Side
Port Allen	West shore
Prince Kuhio Park	
Salt Pond Beach Park	Port Allen (West shore)
SeaLodge Beach	Princeville
Shipwreck (Keoneloa) Beach	Poipu – South Shore
Spouting Horn Beach Park	South shore
Tunnels (Makua) Beach	Haena – North Shore
Wahiawa Bay	
Waiakalua Iki Beach	North shore
Waikoko Beach	Hanalei – North Shore
Wailua Beach	Wailua – East Side
Waimea State Recreation Pier	Waimea – West Side
Wainiha Beach Park	
Waiʻōhai Beach	
Waioli Beach Pine Trees	Hanalei
Waipouli Beach	Waipouli – East Side

== Lānaʻi ==
Beach	Location
Hulopoʻe	Lānaʻi City

== Maui ==
Beach	Location
Waiheʻe Beach Park	Waiheʻe
Waiehu Beach Park	Waiehu
Paukukalo Beach	Paukukalo
Kahului Harbor	Kahului
Kanaha Beach Park	Kahului
Spreckelsville Beach	Spreckelsville
H. A. Baldwin Park	Paia
Lower Paʻia Park	Lower Paʻia
Mantokuji Bay	Lower Paʻia
Kuʻau Bay	Kuʻau
Father Jules Papa	Kuʻau
H-Poko Papa	Hamakua Poko
Hoʻokipa Beach Park	Hamakua Poko
Maliko Bay	Maliko
Kuiaha Bay	Paʻuwela
Honomanu Bay	Honomanu
Keʻanae	Keʻanae
Wailua	Koʻolau
Lower Nahiku	Lower Nahiku
Waiʻanapanapa State Park	Hana
Waikoloa Beach	Hana
Hana Beach Park	Hana
Kaihalulu Beach	Hana
Lehoʻula Beach	Hana
Koki Beach Park	Hana
Hamoa Beach	Hana
Red Sand Beach	Hana
Makaʻalae Beach	Makaʻalae
Wailua	Kipahulu
Pepeiaolepo Beach	Kipahulu
Seven Pools Park	Kipahulu
Mokulau Beach	Kaupo
Nuʻu Bay	Kaupo
Huakini Bay	Kaupo
Kanaio Beach	Honuaʻula
La Perouse Bay	Honuaʻula
ʻĀhihi-Kīnaʻu Natural Area Reserve	Kanahena
Paʻako	Honuaʻula
Oneloa Beach (Big Beach)	Puʻu Ōlaʻi
Puʻu Ōlaʻi Beach (Little Beach)	Puʻu Ōlaʻi
Oneuli Beach	Puʻu Ōlaʻi
Maluaka Beach Park	Honuaʻula
Makena Landing Beach Park	Honuaʻula
Poʻolenalena Beach Park	Poʻolenalena
Palauea Beach	Palauea
Polo Beach	Wailea
Wailea Beach	Wailea
Ulua Beach	Wailea
Mokapu Beach	Wailea
Keawakapu Beach	Keawakapu
Kamaʻole III Beach Park	Kamaʻole
Kamaʻole II Beach Park	Kamaʻole
Kamaʻole I Beach Park	Kamaʻole
Kalama Beach Park	Kamaʻole
Kalepolepo Beach Park	Kalepolepo
Mai Poina ʻOe Iaʻu Beach Park	Kihei
Maʻalaea Beach	Maʻalaea
Kapoli Beach Park	Maʻalaea
McGregor Point	McGregor Point
Papalaua State Wayside Park	Papalaua
Ukumehame Beach Park	Ukumehame
Olowalu Beach	Olowalu
Awalua Beach	Awalua
Launiupoko State Wayside Park	Launiupoko
Puamana Beach Park	Lahaina
Lahaina	Lahaina
Puʻunoa Beach	Lahaina
Wahikuli State Wayside Park	Wahikuli
Hanakaʻoʻo Beach Park	Kāʻanapali
Kāʻanapali Beach	Kāʻanapali
Honokowai Beach Park	Honokowai
Kahana Beach	Kahana
Keonenui Beach	ʻAlaeloa
ʻAlaeloa Beach	ʻAlaeloa
Honokeana	Honokeana
Napili Bay	Napili
Kapalua Beach	Kapalua
Oneloa Beach	Kapalua
D. T. Fleming Beach Park	Honokahua
Mokuleʻia Beach	Honolua
Honolua Bay	Honolua
Punalau Beach	Punalau
Honokohau Bay	Honokohau

== Molokaʻi ==
Beach	Location
Pāpōhaku Beach Park	West shore
Dixie Maru Beach	West shore
Kepuhi Beach	West shore

== Niʻihau ==
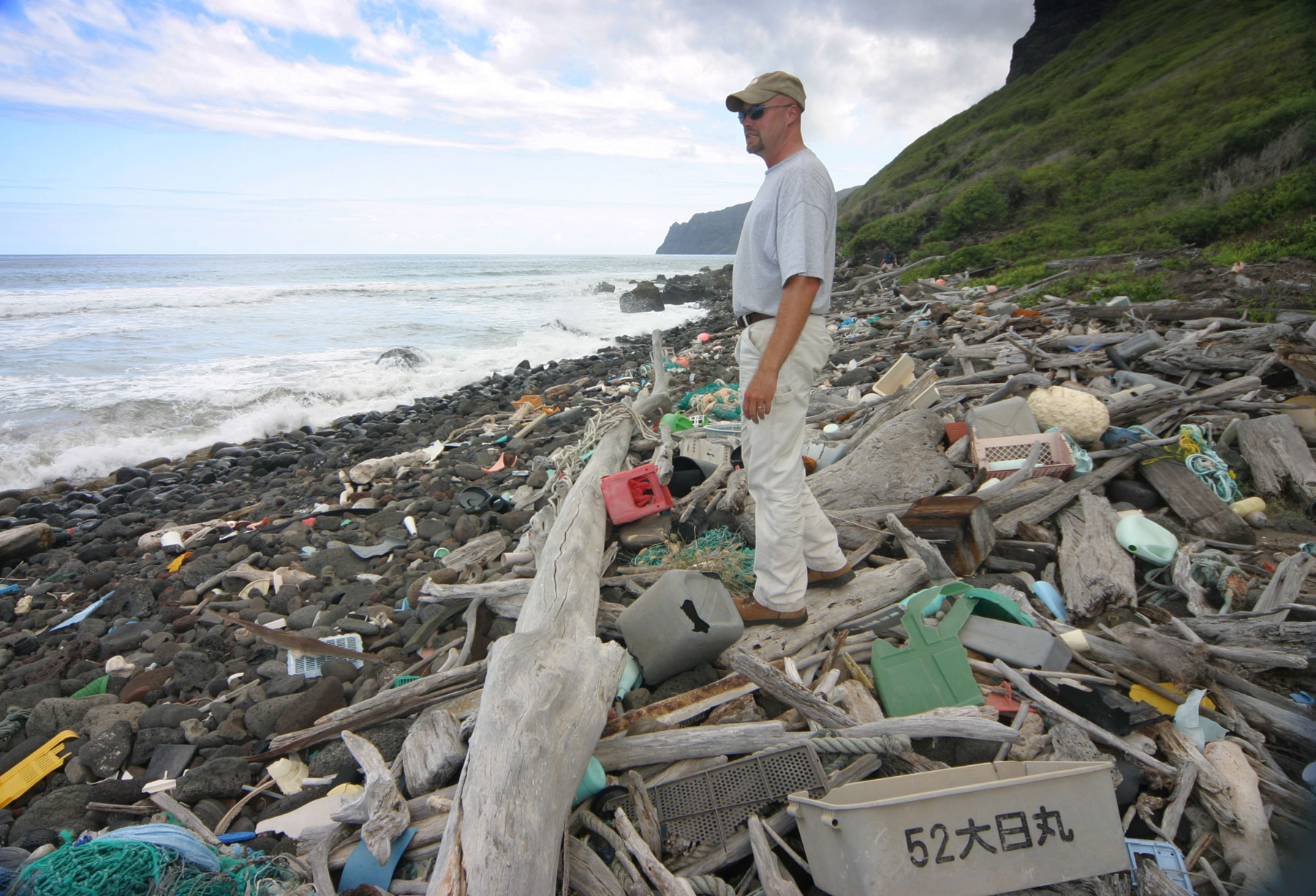
Trash deposited by the ocean on a windward Niʻihau beach

For the beaches on Niʻihau, Clark lists 12 major beaches while Tava and Keale list 46—some of which are probably colloquial names for smaller beaches in this set:

Beach	Location
Kaʻakuʻu Beach	Kaʻakuʻu Bay
Keawanui Beach	Keawanui Bay
Kauwaha Beach	Kauwaha Bay
Puʻuwai Beach	Puʻuwai
Kiʻekiʻe Beach	Kiʻekiʻe
Nonopapa Beach	Nonopapa
Kamalino Beach	Kamalino Bay
Keanahaki Beach	Keanahaki Bay
Poʻooneone Beach	Poʻooneone Point
Kalaoa Beach	Kalaoa Bay
Poleho Beach	Poleho Point

== Oʻahu ==
=== North Shore ===
Beach	Location
Camp Harold Erdman	Mokulēʻia
Mokulēʻia Army Beach	Mokulēʻia
Mokulēʻia Beach	Mokulēʻia
Makaleha Beach Park	Mokulēʻia
ʻĀweoweo Beach Park	Waialua
Puʻuiki Beach Park	Waialua
Kaiaka Bay Beach Park	Haleʻiwa
Haleʻiwa Aliʻi Beach Park	Haleʻiwa
Haleʻiwa Beach Park	Haleʻiwa
Papaʻiloa Beach	Kawailoa
Laniākea Beach	Kawailoa
Chun's Reef Beach	Kawailoa
Kawailoa Beach	Kawailoa
Leftovers Beach Access Park	Kawailoa
Uppers Surfing Support Park	Kawailoa
Waimea Bay Beach Park	Waimea Bay
Pūpūkea Beach Park	Pūpūkea
Kē Iki Beach Park	Pūpūkea
Banzai Beach	Pūpūkea
The Pipeline	Pūpūkea
ʻEhukai Beach Park	Pūpūkea
Sunset Beach	Pūpūkea
Kaunala Beach	Pūpūkea
Waialeʻe Beach Park	Waialeʻe
Kawela Bay Beach	Kawela Bay
Turtle Bay Beach	Kahuku
Bayview Beach (Kuilima Cove)	Kahuku
Kaihalulu Beach	Kahuku
Hanakaʻīlio Beach	Kahuku

=== East Shore ===
Beach	Location
Kahuku Golf Course Beach	Kahuku
Mālaekahana Beach	Kahuku
Mokuʻauia Beach	Kahuku
Hukilau Beach Park	Lāʻie
Temple Beach	Lāʻie
Lāʻie Beach	Lāʻie
Laniloa Beach	Lāʻie
Pounders Beach	Hauʻula
Kokololio Beach	Hauʻula
Kaipapaʻu Beach	Hauʻula
Hauʻula Beach Park	Hauʻula
Kaluanui Beach	Hauʻula
Punaluʻu Beach Park	Punaluʻu
Bay Beach, Ahupuaʻa O Kahana State Park	Kaʻaʻawa
Makaua Beach Park	Kaʻaʻawa
Swanzy Beach Park	Kaʻaʻawa
Kaʻaʻawa Beach Park	Kaʻaʻawa
Kalaeʻōʻio Beach Park	Kaʻaʻawa
Secret Island	Waikāne
Kualoa Regional Park	Waikāne
Waiāhole Beach Park	Waiāhole
Kahaluʻu Regional Park	Kahaluʻu
Laenani Beach Park	Kahaluʻu
Heʻeia State Park	Heʻeia
Kāneʻohe Beach Park	Kāneʻohe
Marine Corps Base Hawaiʻi - Kāneʻohe Bay	Marine Corps Base Hawaiʻi
Kalama Beach	Kailua
Kailua Beach Park	Kailua
Lanikai Beach	Lanikai
Bellows Field Beach Park	Waimānalo Beach
Waimānalo Beach Park	Waimānalo Beach
Kaiona Beach Park	Waimānalo Beach
Kaupō Beach Park	Waimānalo Beach
Makapuʻu Beach Park	Makapuʻu

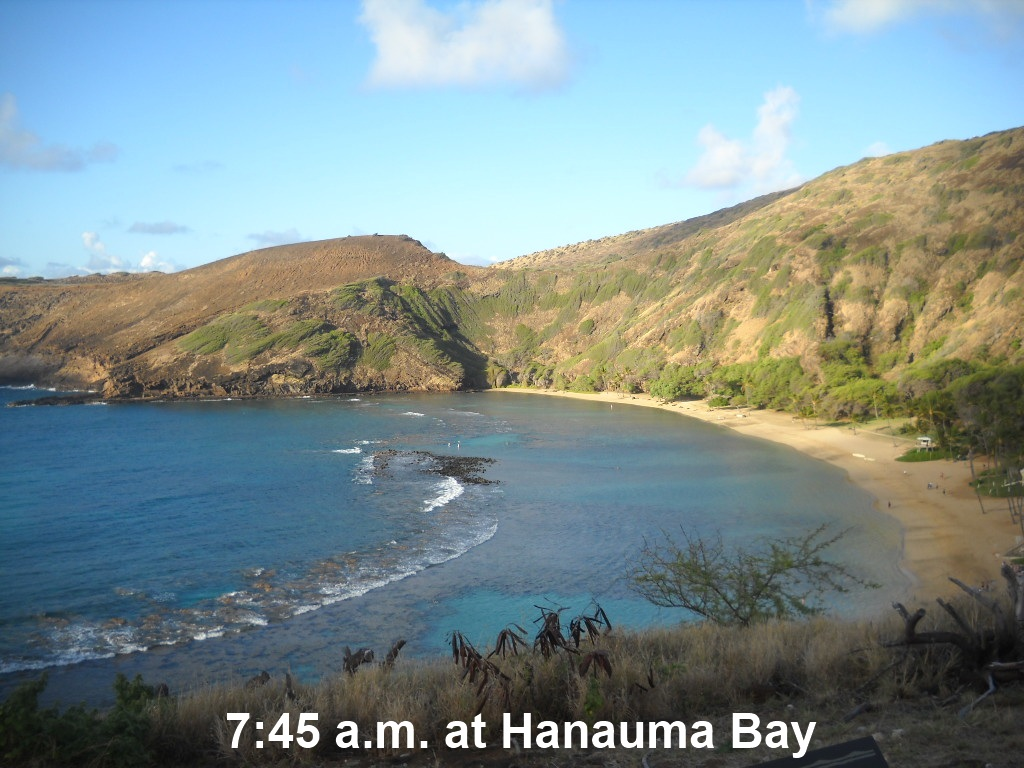
Hanauma Bay

=== South Shore ===
Beach	Location
Queen's Beach (Kaloko Beach)	Koko Head
Sandy Beach Park	Koko Head
Eternity Beach (Hālona Cove)	Koko Head
Hanauma Bay Beach Park	Hawaiʻi Kai
Koko Kai Beach Park	Hawaiʻi Kai
Kōkeʻe Beach Park	Hawaiʻi Kai
Portlock Beach	Hawaiʻi Kai
Maunalua Bay Beach Park	Hawaiʻi Kai
Kuliʻouʻou Beach Park	Hawaiʻi Kai
Paikō Beach	Hawaiʻi Kai
Niu Beach	Hawaiʻi Kai
Kawaikuʻi Beach Park	ʻĀina Haina
Wailupe Beach Park	ʻĀina Haina
Kāhala Mandarin Oriental Beach (Kāhala Hilton Beach)	Kāhala, Honolulu
Waiʻalae Beach Park	Kāhala, Honolulu
Kāhala Beach	Kāhala, Honolulu
Kaʻalāwai Beach	Kaimukī, Honolulu
Kuilei Cliffs Beach Park	Kaimukī, Honolulu
Diamond Head Beach Park	Kaimukī, Honolulu
Lēʻahi Beach Park	Kaimukī, Honolulu
Mākālei Beach Park	Kaimukī, Honolulu
Outrigger Canoe Beach	Kapahulu, Honolulu
Kaimana Beach (Sans Souci Beach)	Kapahulu, Honolulu
Queen's Surf Beach Park	Kapahulu, Honolulu
Waikīkī Beach	Waikīkī, Honolulu
Kūhiō Beach Park (Waikīkī Beach Center)	Waikīkī, Honolulu
Gray's Beach	Waikīkī, Honolulu
Fort DeRussy Beach	Waikīkī, Honolulu
Duke Paoa Kahanamoku Lagoon	Waikīkī, Honolulu
Ala Moana Beach Park	Ala Moana, Honolulu
Kewalo Basin Park	Ala Moana, Honolulu
Kakaʻako Waterfront Park (Point Panic Beach Park)	Kakaʻako, Honolulu
Sand Island State Beach Park	Sand Island, Honolulu
Keʻehi Lagoon Beach Park	Salt Lake, Honolulu
Hickam Harbor Beach	Hickam Air Force Base
Fort Kamehameha Beach	Hickam Air Force Base
Aloha ʻĀina Park	Hickam Air Force Base
ʻAiea Bay State Recreation Area	ʻAiea
Neal S. Blaisdell Park (Pearl Harbor Park)	Pearl Harbor
West Loch Shoreline Park	Waipahu
Iroquois Beach	ʻEwa Beach
ʻEwa Beach Park	ʻEwa Beach
Oneʻula Beach Park	ʻEwa Beach
White Plains Beach	Kalaeloa
Nimitz Beach	Kalaeloa
Barber's Point Beach Park	Kalaeloa

=== West Shore ===
Beach	Location
Ko Olina Beach Park	Kalaeloa
Lanikūhonua Beach	Nānākuli
Kahe Point Beach Park	Nānākuli
Tracks Beach Park (Hawaiian Electric Beach Park)	Nānākuli
Nānākuli Beach Park	Nānākuli
Ulehawa Beach Park	Nānākuli
Māʻili Beach Park	Māʻili
Lualualei Beach Park	Waiʻanae
Pōkaʻī Bay Beach	Waiʻanae
Waiʻanae Regional Park	Waiʻanae
Makana Beach Park	Waiʻanae
Mauna Lahilahi Beach Park	Mākaha
Turtle Beach	Mākaha
Aki's Beach	Mākaha
Mākaha Beach Park	Mākaha
Keaʻau Beach Park	Mākaha
ʻŌhikilolo Beach	Kaena Point
Mākua Beach	Kaena Point
Keawaʻula Beach	Kaena Point
Kaʻena Point (Yokohama Bay)	Kaena Point

== See also ==
- List of places in Hawaii
- List of beaches
- List of beaches in the United States
