= Hawaii Land Trust =

American non-profit organization

Coordinates: 20.88677°N 156.507385°W

Hawaiian Islands Land Trust
- Abbreviation: HILT
- Nickname: Hawai'i Land Trust
- Formation: January 2011; 15 years ago
- Merger of: Maui Coastal Land Trust; Kauaʻi Public Land Trust; Hawaiʻi Island Land Trust; Oʻahu Land Trust
- Type: Nonprofit
- Tax ID no.: 99-0353223
- Legal status: 501(c)(3)
- Headquarters: Honolulu, Hawaii
- Website: https://www.hilt.org/

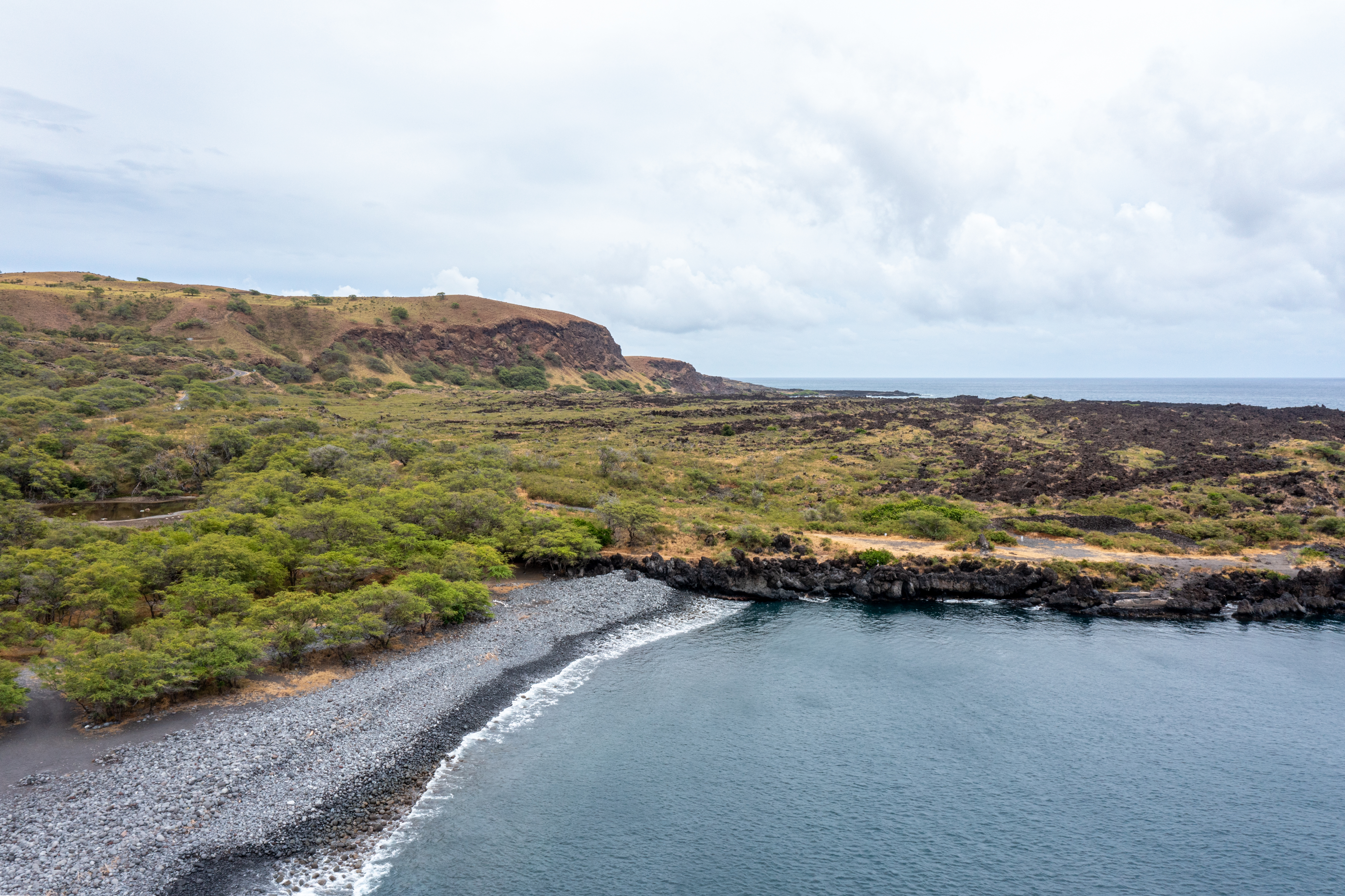
Nuʻu Refuge, Kaupō Maui. Protected since 2011

The Hawaii Land Trust (HILT) is a non-profit organization established in Hawaii to “protect the lands that sustain us for current and future generations". The organization works with landowners to protect important areas by restricting commercial or other development. This protection is provided either by the landowner accepting a conservation easement on the land or by selling the land to HILT. As of 2018, the organization protected more than 18,000 acres (7,300 ha) across the state.

== History ==
In January 2011, HILT was formed from the merger of the Kauai Public Land Trust, the Oahu Land Trust, the Maui Coastal Land Trust, and the Hawaii Island Land Trust.

The first executive director was Dale Bonar, followed by Ted Clement, Kawika Burgess, and then Laura Kaakua.

Originally named Hawaiian Islands Land Trust, in 2021 the organization renamed itself as Hawaii Land Trust, while retaining its acronym HILT.

== Services ==
In addition to its core function of conserving important lands for future generations, HILT provides educational services, research and opportunities for recreation.

=== Talk Story on the Land ===
HILT offers a series of educational walks on its properties across the state.

=== Recreation ===
HILT properties are generally open to the public for activities such as fishing, camping and hiking.

=== Research ===
HILT staff conducts research on Hawaii's unique anchialine ponds and on the culture that surrounds them.

== Properties ==
HILT has protected 57 properties on O'ahu, Kauai, Maui, Molokaʻi and Hawaiʻi Island, totaling more than 21,650 acres (8,760 ha). Two thousand one hundred acres (850 ha) are protected in HILT-owned preserves that are open to the public, and over 19,000 acres (7,700 ha) are protected via conservation easements that permanently restrict privately owned land. Protected lands include coastlines, farms, ranches, cultural sites, traditional Hawaiian fishponds, native forests, and wetlands. HILT is actively working to protect additional coastlines, Hawaiian cultural landscapes, and lands that grow food for Hawaiʻi's people.

=== Waiheʻe coastal dunes and wetlands refuge ===
The Waiheʻe coastal dunes and wetlands refuge protects over 277 acres (112 ha) of land on Maui. The refuge includes 24 acres (9.7 hectares) of coastal, spring-fed wetland, 103 acres (42 hectares) of sand dune ecosystem, over 7,000 feet (2,100 m) of shoreline and more than 8 acres (3.2 hectares) of riparian habitat, totaling 277 acres (112 hectares). It is located on the windward side of Maui, Hawaii.

The Maui Coastal Land Trust took ownership of this site in 2004 with support from Maui County. The property passed to HILT with the merger.

Active restoration programs have replaced invasive vegetation with native species, enhanced wildlife habitat and preserved archaeological and cultural resources. Restoration employs primarily volunteer labor, managed by professional staff.

The refuge is an important historical site, once hosting kingly residences, battles and Hawaiian legends. The refuge once hosted two fishing Hawaiian villages, an extensive inland Hawaiian fish ponds and several heiau (Hawaiian temple).

The refuge incorporates the last of Maui's large sand dunes that once stretched from Waihe'e to Makena, which once led to the island's nickname of "Sahara in the Pacific". The dunes are some 200 feet (61 m) high.

==== Acquisition ====
The purchase was funded by Maui County (which provided $2,000,000), the United States Fish and Wildlife Service (FWS) (which contributed a further $2 million) and the National Oceanic and Atmospheric Administration (NOAA) (which provided $800,000). Management funding came from FWS, the National Resource Conservation Service Wetlands Reserve Program, NOAA, other grants and private funding from foundations, individuals and groups.

==== Climate change ====
Expected rising sea levels could inundate the sand dunes with seawater or transform them into sandy beaches. A 10 feet (3.0 m) rise is expected to submerge 50-60% of the refuge. Adaptations that would preserve environmental and cultural values have yet to be developed/discovered. It is possible that the return to pre-development ecological status will provide sufficient resilience to provide protection.

==== Agriculture ====
Restoration plans include restoration of the fishpond and production of historically farmed crops such as taro. Nine taro patches are undergoing restoration, occupying about 0.5 acres (0.20 hectares).

Some 200 sheep live in the refuge.

==== Conservation ====
Six endangered taxa, two endangered plants, and two endangered insects were found on the site. Eight endangered species have repopulated the refuge, including aeʻo (stilt), alae keʻokeʻo (coot), koloa (duck) and nene (goose).

When the property was first protected, 95% of the plants were invasive species. As of 2014, 70% of the flora in the wetland are native species.

==== Culture ====
Many of the important cultural and archaeological sites are located in sand dunes at or near the water. The dunes contains multiple burial sites. The dunes were fenced off to reduce foot traffic and exclude invasive predators. Thereafter endangered bird species began to nest on the dunes, acting as a natural vector and fertilizer for native plants.

=== Nu'u ===
HILT purchased the 82-acre Nu'u Preserve in 2011. The preserve provides habitat for endangered bird species and is home to numerous pre-contact archaeological sites, including petroglyphs and traditional house sites.

=== Nisei Veterans Peace Park ===
In 2015 the Nisei Veterans Memorial Center donated a 4.5-acre parcel (1.8 ha) in Kahului to HILT, Maui and turned it into a memorial park to commemorate the service of the Nisei Veterans in World War II.

=== Maunawila Heiau ===
In 2015, HILT took ownership of Maunawila Heiau located on 9 acres (3.6 ha) in Hau'ula, Hawaii and began to restore it.

=== Kahili Beach Park ===
In 2013, the Trust acquired a 12.2-acre parcel at Kahili beach in Kilauea.

=== Wainiha ===
In 2008, HILT acquired a .4-acre parcel at Wainiha at Halelea.

=== Easements ===
HILT holds multiple conservation easements on 'Oahu, Maui, Hawaii Island and Kauai.

== Recognition program ==
Each year HILT honors a major contributor to the environment as a Champion of the Land.

- United States Senator Brian Schatz (2017)
- Henk Rogers (2018)
- Founding members Susan and Jac Kean (2019)

HILT gave a separate honor to former Board Chair Peter Merriman in 2018.
