= Makena Beach & Golf Resort =

Makena Beach & Golf Resort Maui
- Makena Beach logo

- Location within Hawaii

General information
- Location: Makena district, next to Wailea, 5400 Makena Alanui; Wailea-Makena Hawaii 96753
- Coordinates: 20°39′14″N 156°26′25″W
- Opening: August 1986 as the Maui Prince Hotel
- Closed: July 1, 2016; 9 years ago
- Management: The Landmark Hotels Group

Technical details
- Floor count: 5

Design and construction
- Architects: Anbe, Aruga, and Ishizu architects, Inc
- Developer: AREA Property Partners, Trinity Investments LLC, Stanford Carr Development LLC.

Other information
- Number of rooms: 290
- Number of suites: 20
- Number of restaurants: 5

Website
- Makena Resort Maui

Makena Beach & Golf Resort Maui was a beach and golf resort in the Makena district, on the southern shore of Maui County, Hawaiʻi, United States. The resort was formerly known as the Maui Prince Hotel, and was designed by Anbe, Aruga, and Ishizu architects. It was opened in August 1986 and subsequently sold in July 2010 to AREA Property Partners. It had several hundred rooms and suites leading to an open-air atrium and outdoor pools built around an Asian meditation garden with waterfalls.

In July 2016, the resort owner, ATC Makena Holdings LLC, announced that it was closing the hotel to redevelop the property into a luxury condominium community called the Makena Golf and Beach Club.

== History ==
Seibu Hawaii, Inc. a Japanese company, acquired a prime beachfront parcel of land in Makena in 1983. The design by Anbe, Aruga, and Ishizu architects of Honolulu and the opening of the Maui Prince Hotel resort followed in August 1986. About 1,300 acres of land surrounding the hotel and golf courses were kept in their natural state.

The Seibu Group of Japan operated the Maui Prince Hotel resort until 2007. It was then acquired by Maui developers and investors Everett Dowling and Morgan Stanley who tried unsuccessfully to run it until September 2009. The hotel was subsequently sold in July 2010 to a group of investors led by AREA Property Partners, Trinity Investments LLC, and Stanford Carr Development LLC. Then Landmark Hotels Group, Inc. took control of its management until January 2012 and renamed it the Makena Beach & Golf Resort with Declan McCarthy as the current General Manager.

The resort, located near the Wailea Golf Courses, had 290 rooms and 20 suites. There were two outdoor pools (one for adults, one for children), an 18-hole golf course designed by Robert Trent Jones, Jr., six tennis courts, a fitness room, a Jacuzzi, water sports assistance, a shopping arcade, a salon, and in-room massage. In addition, the Makena Kai Day Spa was operated by Hawaiian Rainforest Spa which specializes in Hawaiian healing arts and provides massage therapy, facials, and body treatments. The resort had four restaurants and two bars (with local Hawaiian music nightly).

In 2014, a group led by Hawaii developer Stanford Carr expressed to the Maui Planning Commission the intention to transform the resort into luxury apartments and hotel.

In 2016, it was announced by ATC Makena Holdings, LLC, owners of the 1,800-acre Makena Resort, that it would close the 310-room Makena Beach & Golf Resort (formerly the Maui Prince Hotel) at noon on July 1. The hotel was demolished in 2018.

== See also ==
- Makena, Hawaii
- List of beaches in Hawaii
- The Resort (film), filming location
