= Mākena, Hawaii =

Mākena
- Census-designated place
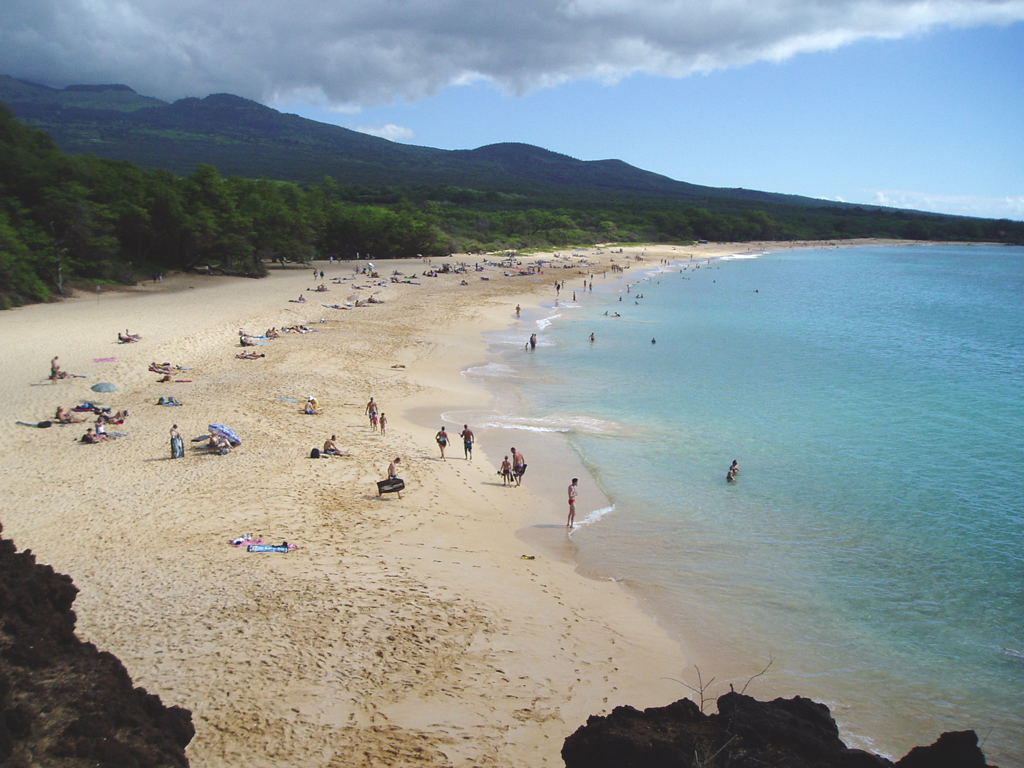
- "Big Beach" at Makena State Park

- Location in Hawaii
- Coordinates: 20°39′14″N 156°26′25″W
- Country: United States
- State: Hawaii
- County: Maui

Area
  - Total: 11.54 sq mi (29.89 km^{2})
  - Land: 9.47 sq mi (24.53 km^{2})
  - Water: 2.07 sq mi (5.36 km^{2})
- Elevation: 20 ft (6.1 m)

Population (2020)
  - Total: 196
  - Density: 20.7/sq mi (7.99/km^{2})
- Time zone: UTC-10 (Hawaii-Aleutian)
- ZIP Code: 96753 (Wailea)
- Area code: 808
- FIPS code: 15-48350

Mākena is a census-designated place (CDP) in the extreme southwest of the island of Maui in Maui County, Hawaiʻi, United States. As of the 2020 census, it had a population of 196, up from 99 in 2010. Prior to 2010, the area was part of the Wailea-Makena census-designated place.

== Geography ==
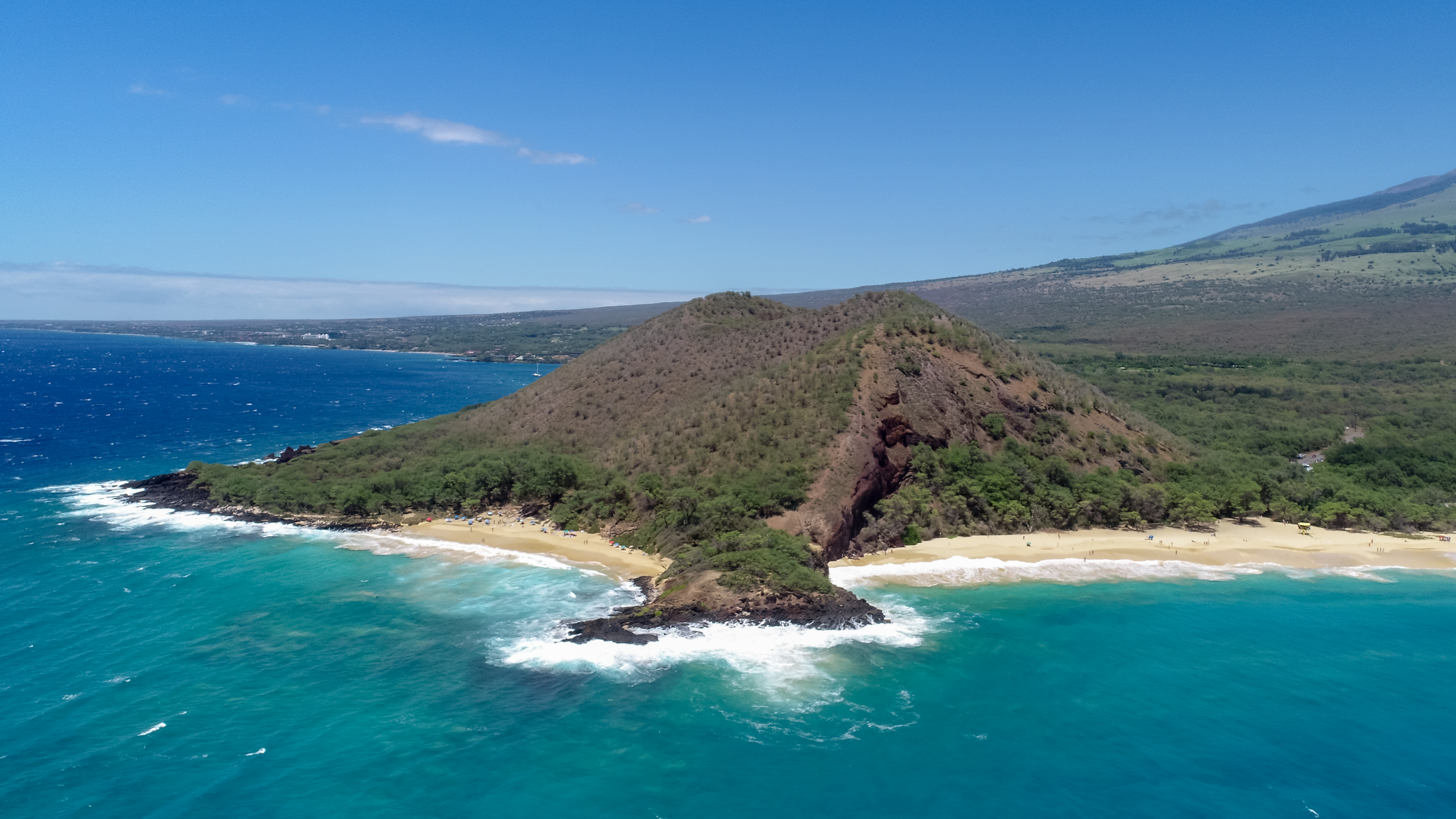
Part of “Big Beach on right, “Little Beach” on left, and the dwarf cinder cone south of Wailea behind

Makena is located on the south side of the island of Maui at 20°39′14″N 156°26′25″W (20.6539, -156.4403). It is bordered to the north by Wailea and to the west by the Pacific Ocean. Road access is only available from the north, by Makena Road.

According to the United States Census Bureau, the CDP has a total area of 11.5 square miles (29.9 km^{2}), of which 9.5 square miles (24.5 km^{2}) are land and 2.1 square miles (5.4 km^{2}), or 17.93%, are water.

=== Climate ===
Climate data for Makena, Hawaii (Makena Golf Course) 1991–2020 normals, extremes 1982–present
Month	Jan	Feb	Mar	Apr	May	Jun	Jul	Aug	Sep	Oct	Nov	Dec	Year
Record high °F (°C)	90 (32)	87 (31)	89 (32)	89 (32)	90 (32)	91 (33)	93 (34)	94 (34)	94 (34)	94 (34)	95 (35)	91 (33)	95 (35)
Mean daily maximum °F (°C)	80.1 (26.7)	79.9 (26.6)	81.2 (27.3)	83.1 (28.4)	84.3 (29.1)	85.9 (29.9)	87.1 (30.6)	87.3 (30.7)	86.8 (30.4)	86.1 (30.1)	83.4 (28.6)	81.2 (27.3)	83.9 (28.8)
Daily mean °F (°C)	71.8 (22.1)	71.4 (21.9)	72.3 (22.4)	73.8 (23.2)	75.0 (23.9)	76.8 (24.9)	78.1 (25.6)	78.3 (25.7)	78.0 (25.6)	77.2 (25.1)	75.1 (23.9)	73.0 (22.8)	75.1 (23.9)
Mean daily minimum °F (°C)	63.5 (17.5)	63.0 (17.2)	63.5 (17.5)	64.5 (18.1)	65.8 (18.8)	67.8 (19.9)	69.1 (20.6)	69.2 (20.7)	69.1 (20.6)	68.4 (20.2)	66.9 (19.4)	64.8 (18.2)	66.3 (19.1)
Record low °F (°C)	54 (12)	54 (12)	54 (12)	58 (14)	54 (12)	62 (17)	62 (17)	62 (17)	61 (16)	61 (16)	56 (13)	57 (14)	54 (12)
Average rainfall inches (mm)	2.48 (63)	1.28 (33)	1.99 (51)	0.75 (19)	1.08 (27)	0.38 (9.7)	0.77 (20)	1.21 (31)	1.11 (28)	1.55 (39)	1.24 (31)	1.85 (47)	15.70 (399)
Average rainy days (≥ 0.01 in)	5.5	4.6	4.9	3.2	3.9	2.0	3.3	2.7	5.0	2.9	4.2	4.9	47.1
Source: NOAA

== Demographics ==
Historical population
Census	Pop.	Note	%±
2010	99		—
2020	196		98.0%
U.S. Decennial Census

== See also ==
- List of beaches in Hawaii#Maui
- Makena Beach & Golf Resort - A hotel/ resort in the Makena area.
