= Ko Olina Beach Park =

Park in Oahu, Hawaii

Coordinates: 21°19′36.04″N 158°07′21.57″W

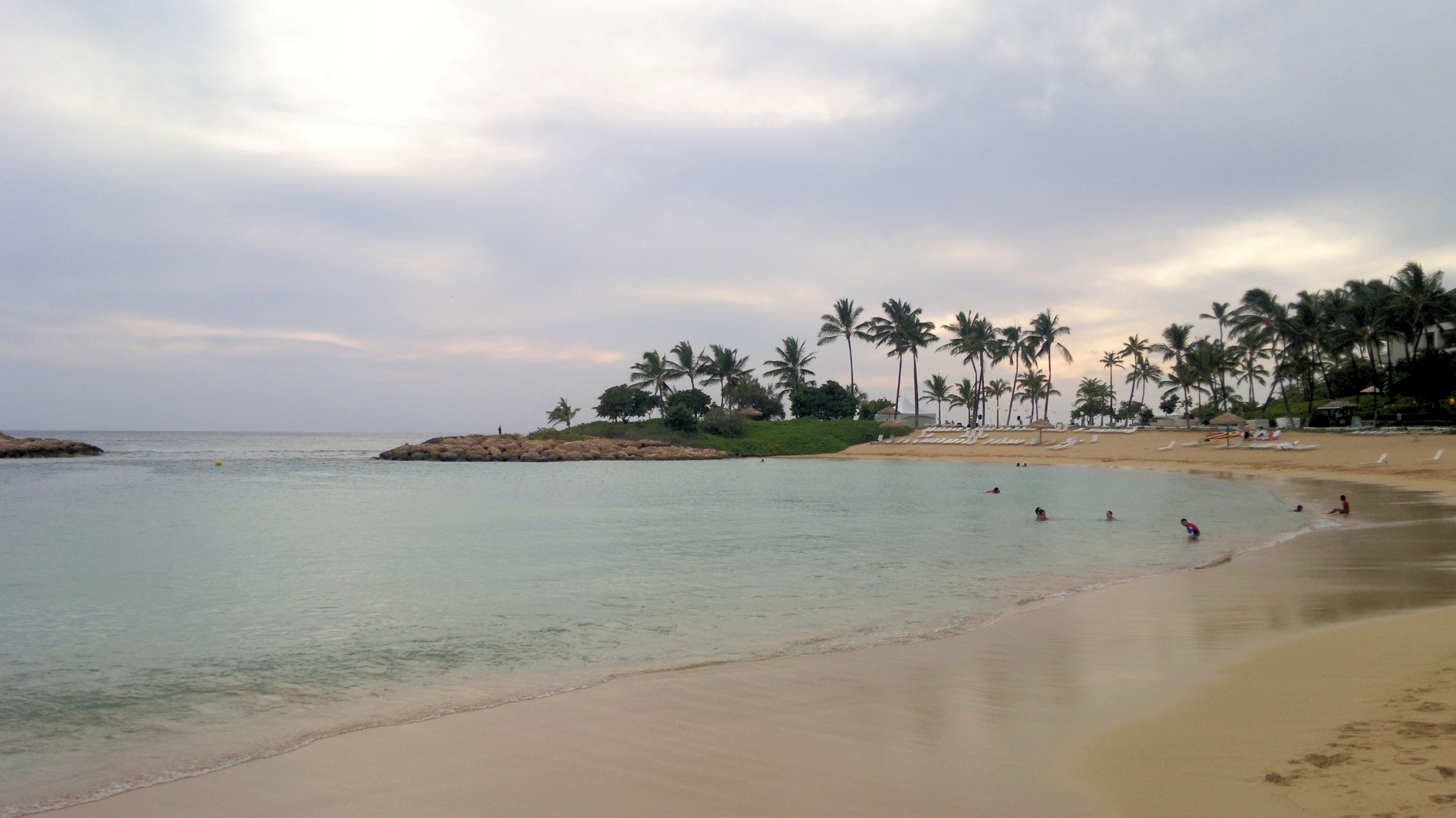
Ko Olina Ulua Lagoon and Grand Lawn

Ko Olina's Grand Lawn is a privately owned and maintained lagoon-front setting located on the west side of the island of Oahu, Hawaii within Ko Olina Resort, part of the City and County of Honolulu. Located at the east end of Ko Olina's 642-acre resort community, the Grand Lawn is adjacent to the resort's white-sand Ulua Lagoon, one of four in Ko Olina, and the Ko Olina Marina. The lagoon is protected by a breakwater reef, ensuring relatively calm ocean conditions.

== See also ==
- List of beaches in Oahu
