= Wailea-Makena, Hawaii =

- Former CDP
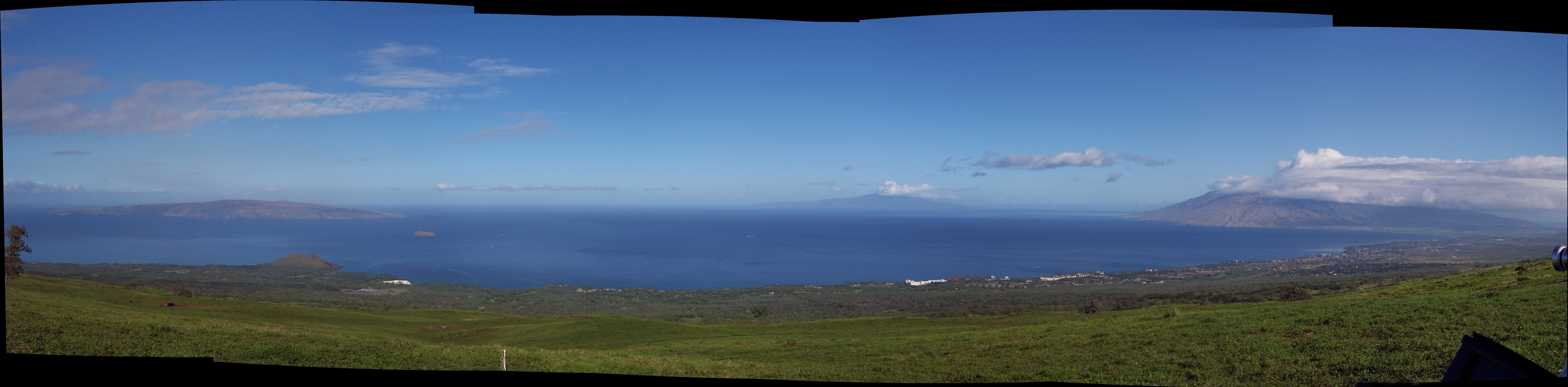
- View from Upcountry Maui

- Location in Maui County and the state of Hawaii
- Coordinates: 20°41′24″N 156°26′21″W
- Country: United States
- State: Hawaii
- County: Maui

Area
  - Total: 26.8 sq mi (69.5 km^{2})
  - Land: 22.6 sq mi (58.6 km^{2})
  - Water: 4.2 sq mi (10.8 km^{2})

Population (2000)
  - Total: 5,671
  - Density: 250/sq mi (96.7/km^{2})
- Time zone: UTC-10 (Hawaii-Aleutian)
- Area code: 808
- FIPS code: 15-76935

Wailea-Makena was a census-designated place (CDP) in Maui County, Hawaiʻi, United States, during the 2000 census, at which time its population was 5,671. The area was split into two CDPs, Wailea and Makena, for the 2010 census.

== Geography ==
Wailea-Makena was located at 20°41′24″N 156°26′21″W (20.690104, -156.439108).

According to the United States Census Bureau, the CDP had a total area of 26.8 square miles (69 km^{2}), of which, 22.6 square miles (59 km^{2}) of it is land and 4.2 square miles (11 km^{2}) of it (15.62%) is water.

== Demographics ==
As of the census of 2000, there were 5,671 people, 2,520 households, and 1,522 families residing in the CDP. The population density is 250.6 people per square mile (96.8 people/km^{2}). There were 5,099 housing units at an average density of 225.3 per square mile (87.0/km^{2}). The racial makeup of the CDP was 75.70% White, 0.79% African American, 0.51% Native American, 10.53% Asian, 2.10% Pacific Islander, 1.02% from other races, and 9.35% from two or more races. Hispanic or Latino of any race were 5.01% of the population.

There were 2,520 households, out of which 20.6% had children under the age of 18 living with them, 51.2% were married couples living together, 5.8% had a female householder with no husband present, and 39.6% were non-families. 26.2% of all households were made up of individuals, and 4.9% had someone living alone who was 65 years of age or older. The average household size was 2.25 and the average family size was 2.68.

In the CDP the population was spread out, with 16.7% under the age of 18, 4.8% from 18 to 24, 30.6% from 25 to 44, 34.1% from 45 to 64, and 13.8% who were 65 years of age or older. The median age was 44 years. For every 100 females, there were 103.1 males. For every 100 females age 18 and over, there were 102.9 males.

The median income for a household in the CDP was $56,806, and the median income for a family was $66,923. Males had a median income of $36,788 versus $30,884 for females. The per capita income for the CDP was $35,342. About 5.8% of families and 6.6% of the population were below the poverty line, including 7.3% of those under the age of 18 and 8.8% of those 65 and older.

== See also ==
List of beaches in Hawaii#Maui
