= Waimānalo Beach, Hawaii =

Census-designated place in the United States

Waimānalo Beach
- Census-designated place
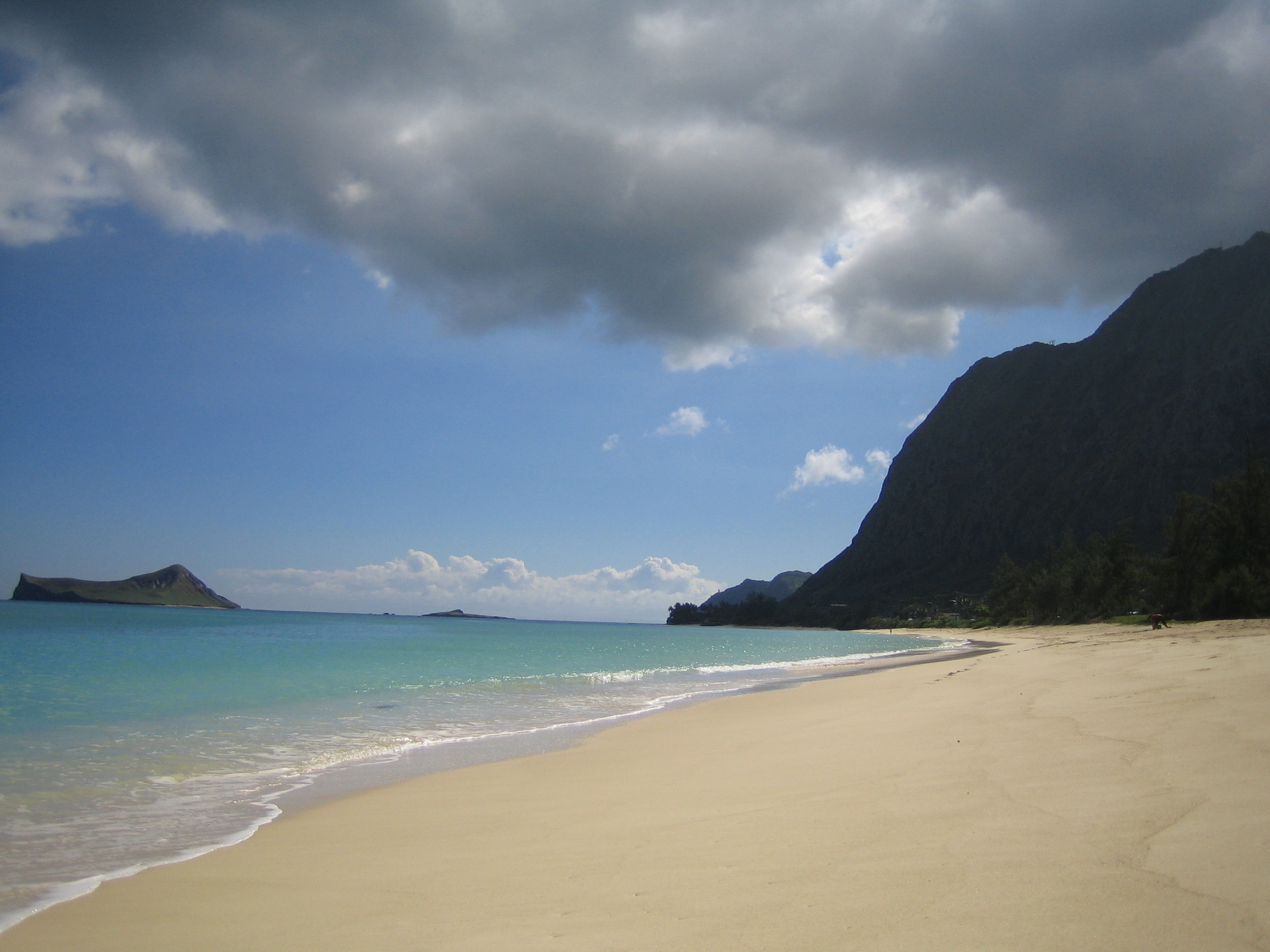
- The beach at Waimānalo on windward Oʻahu

- Location in Honolulu County and the state of Hawaiʻi
- Coordinates: 21°20′1″N 157°41′53″W
- Country: United States
- State: Hawaiʻi

Area
  - Total: 2.97 sq mi (7.68 km^{2})
  - Land: 1.98 sq mi (5.12 km^{2})
  - Water: 0.99 sq mi (2.56 km^{2})
- Elevation: 16 ft (5 m)

Population (2020)
  - Total: 4,823
  - Density: 2,441.9/sq mi (942.83/km^{2})
- Time zone: UTC-10 (Hawaii-Aleutian)
- Area code: 808
- FIPS code: 15-78200
- GNIS feature ID: 0364777

Waimānalo Beach is a census-designated place (CDP) located in the City & County of Honolulu, in the District of Koʻolaupoko, on the island of Oʻahu in the U.S. state of Hawaiʻi. This small windward community is located near the eastern end of the island, and the climate is dry. As of the 2020 census, the CDP had a population of 4,823. This neighborhood is close to, but somewhat separate from Waimānalo, although the two form a single community.

Waimānalo Beach (the town) lies along the eastern half of Waimānalo Beach (the beach), with an overall length of nearly 5.5 mi (8.9 km), the longest stretch of sandy shoreline on Oʻahu. Waimānalo Beach has sparse commercial development along Kalanianaole Highway, and is noteworthy for its local flavor and proximity to Makapuʻu Beach and Sea Life Park, which lie closer to Makapuʻu Point at the east end of the island of Oʻahu. There are no hotels here.

The U.S. postal code for Waimānalo Beach and Waimānalo is 96795.

Kazuo Sakamaki, the first prisoner of war taken by U.S. forces during World War II, was captured on December 8, 1941, on Waimānalo Beach the day after the surprise attack on Pearl Harbor and surrounding targets in Honolulu by Imperial Japanese Navy forces.

The Anderson Estate, which was featured in the TV series Magnum, P.I. as "Robin's Nest", is located in Waimānalo Beach.

== Geography ==
Waimānalo Beach is located at 21°20′1″N 157°41′53″W (21.333657, -157.698055). The nearest town is Waimānalo to the west.

According to the United States Census Bureau, the town has a total area of 3.0 square miles (7.7 km^{2}), of which 2.0 square miles (5.1 km^{2}) is land and 1.0 square mile (2.6 km^{2}) is water. The total area is 33.45% water.

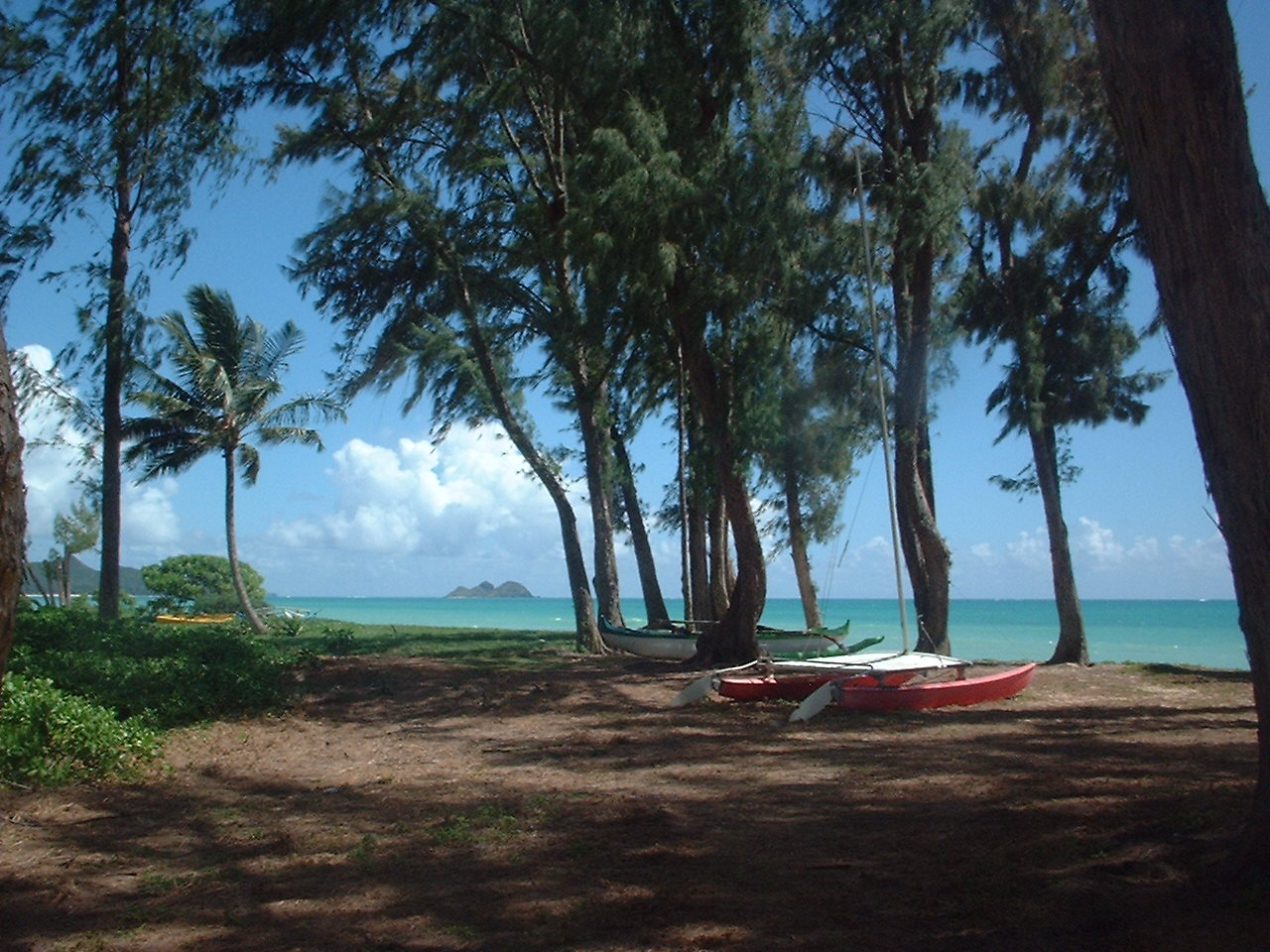
Peaceful and typical scene behind the residential areas of Waimānalo

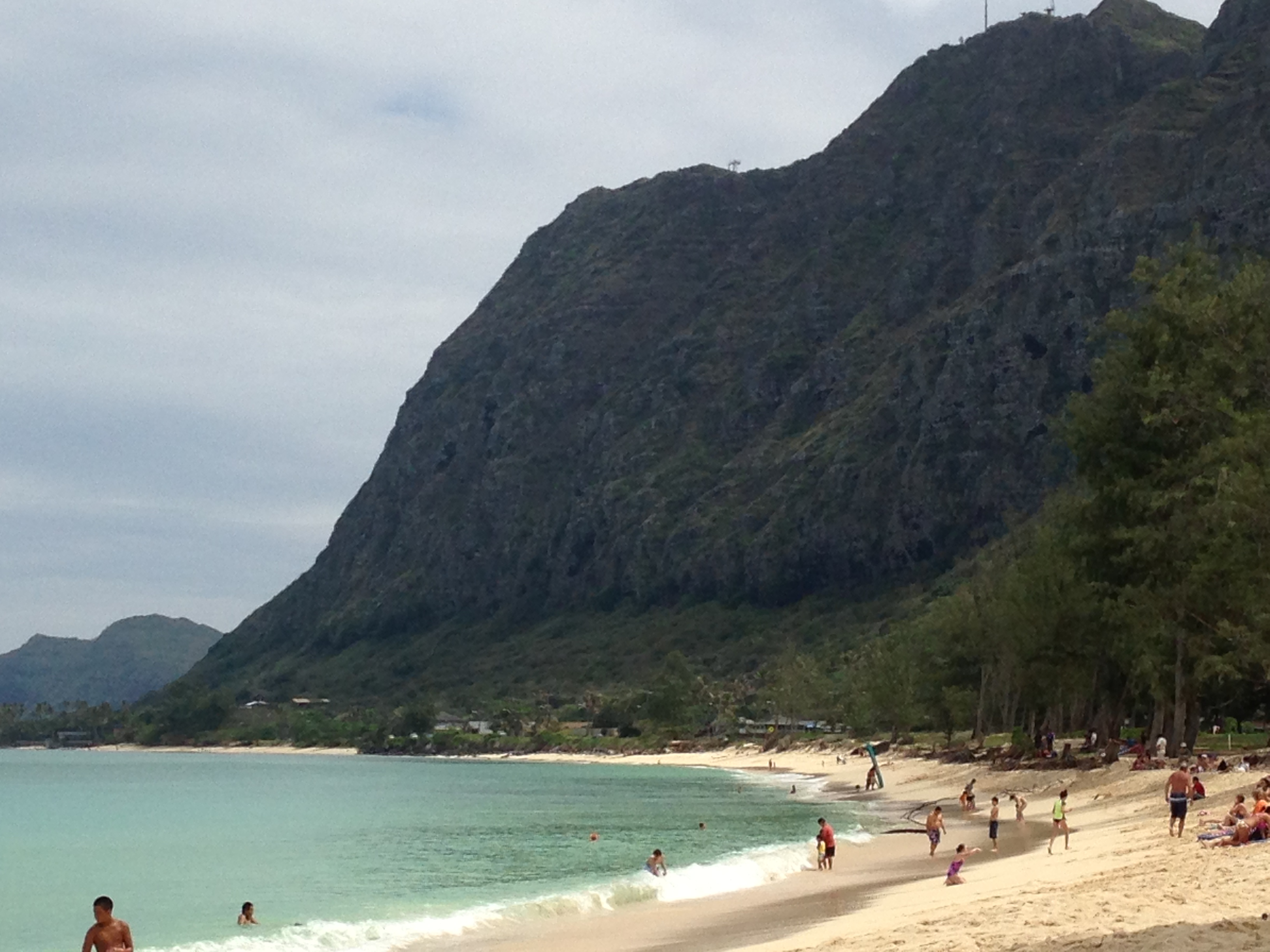
Waimānalo Beach itself, including 'da Bend' (looking south towards Makapu'u)

== Demographics ==
Historical population
Census	Pop.	Note	%±
2020	4,823		—
U.S. Decennial Census

As of the census of 2000, there were 4,271 people, 1,006 households, and 848 families residing in the CDP. The population density was 2,617.1 inhabitants per square mile (1,010.5/km^{2}). There were 1,046 housing units at an average density of 640.9 per square mile (247.5/km^{2}). The racial makeup of the CDP was 12.97% White, 0.09% African American, 0.23% Native American, 5.34% Asian, 47.39% Pacific Islander, 0.63% from other races, and 33.34% from two or more races. 6.49% of the population were Hispanic or Latino of any race.

There were 1,006 households, out of which 28.7% had children under the age of 18 living with them, 51.4% were married couples living together, 23.2% had a female householder with no husband present, and 15.7% were non-families. 8.9% of all households were made up of individuals, and 2.7% had someone living alone who was 65 years of age or older. The average household size was 4.25 and the average family size was 4.50.

In the CDP the population was spread out, with 26.7% under the age of 18, 10.3% from 18 to 24, 28.9% from 25 to 44, 22.5% from 45 to 64, and 11.6% who were 65 years of age or older. The median age was 35 years. For every 100 females there were 97.5 males. For every 100 females age 18 and over, there were 92.7 males.

The median income for a household in the CDP was $55,781, and the median income for a family was $57,281. Males had a median income of $35,074 versus $25,440 for females. The per capita income for the town was $16,089. 8.5% of the population and 5.5% of families were below the poverty line. Out of the total population, 5.3% of those under the age of 18 and 7.9% of those 65 and older were living below the poverty line.

== Education ==
Hawaii Department of Education operates public schools. Blanche Pope Elementary School is in the CDP.

== See also ==
- List of beaches in Hawaii
