= Mākena State Park =

State park in Makena, Maui Island, Hawaii, United States

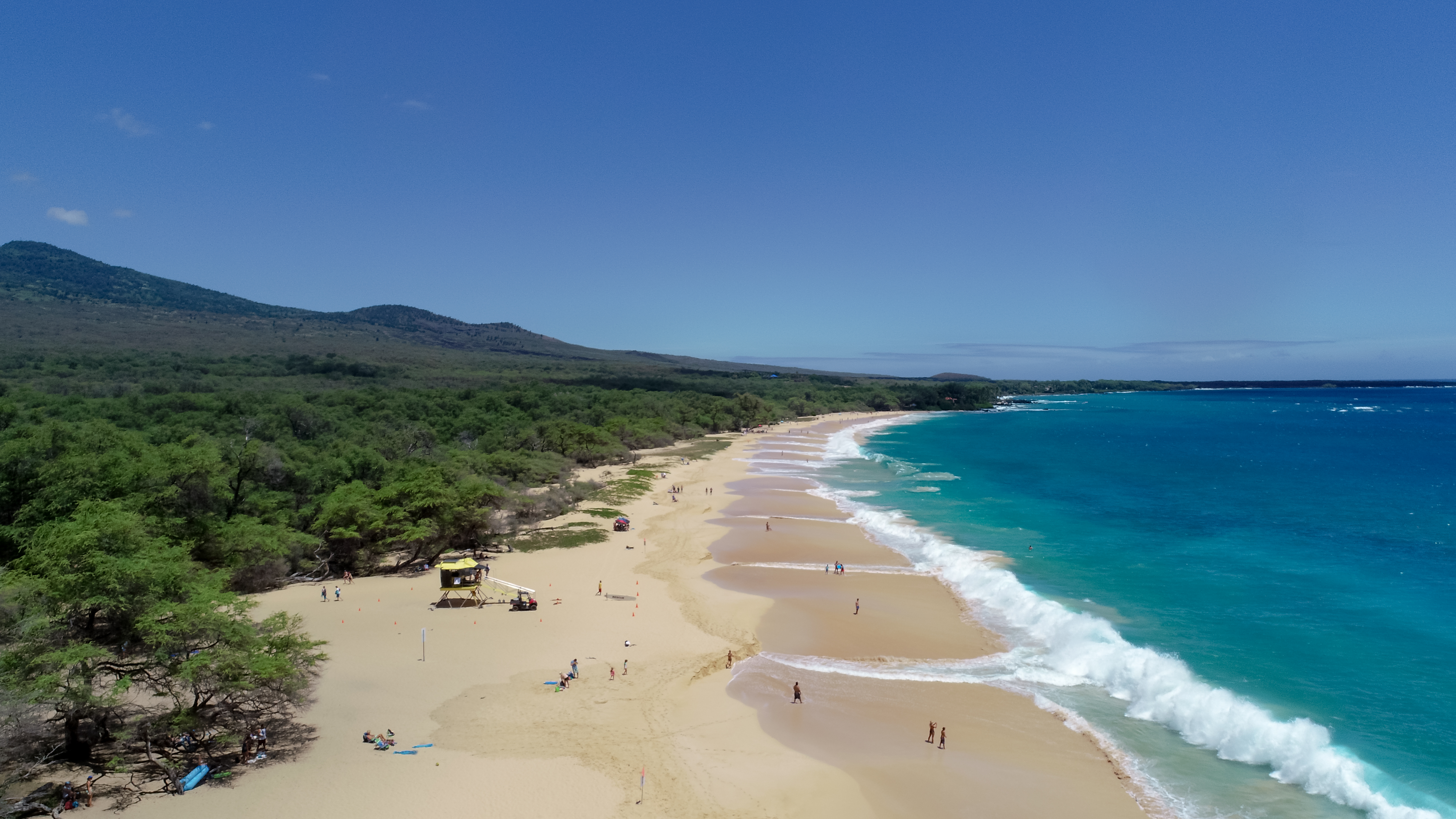
"Big Beach"

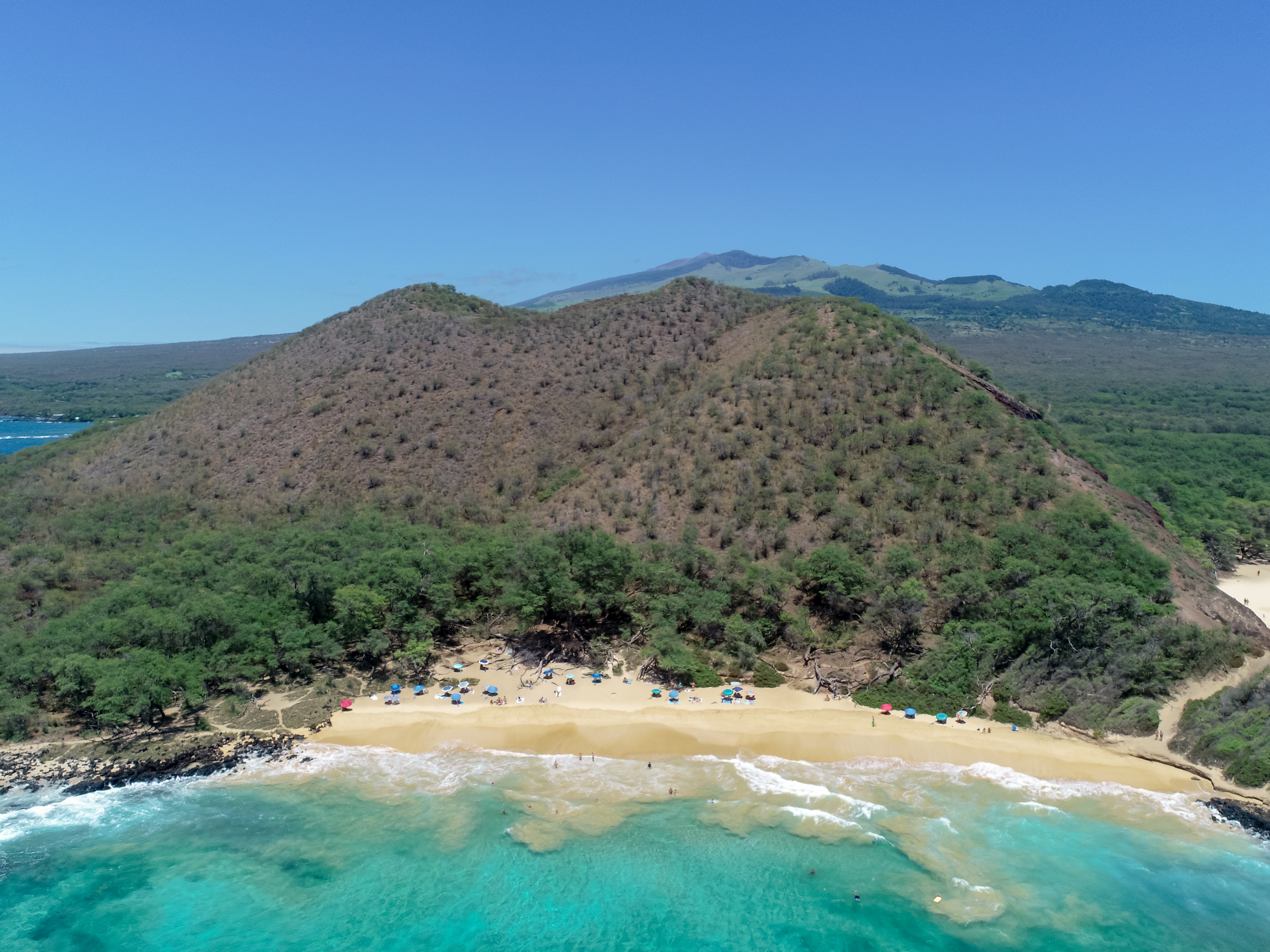
"Little Beach"

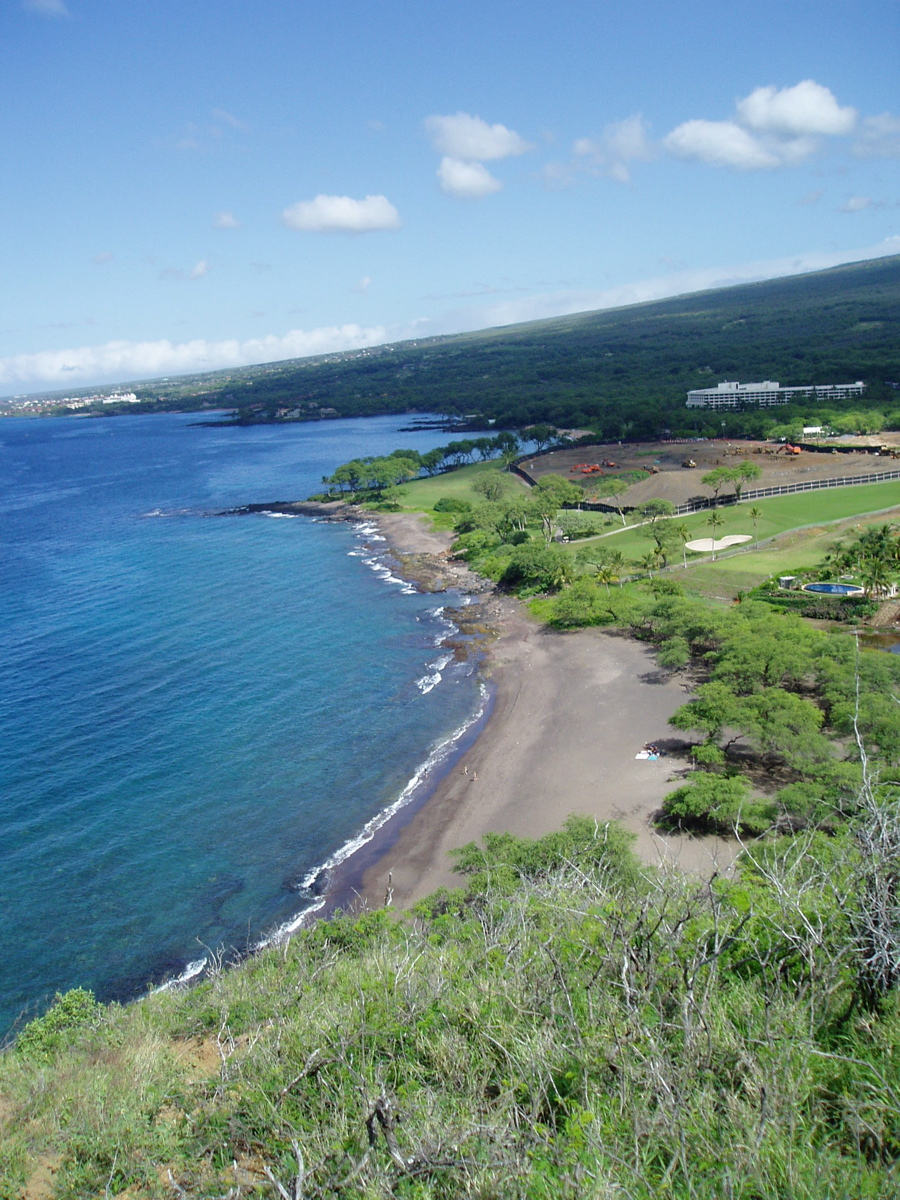
Oneʻuli Beach from top of Puʻu Ōlaʻi

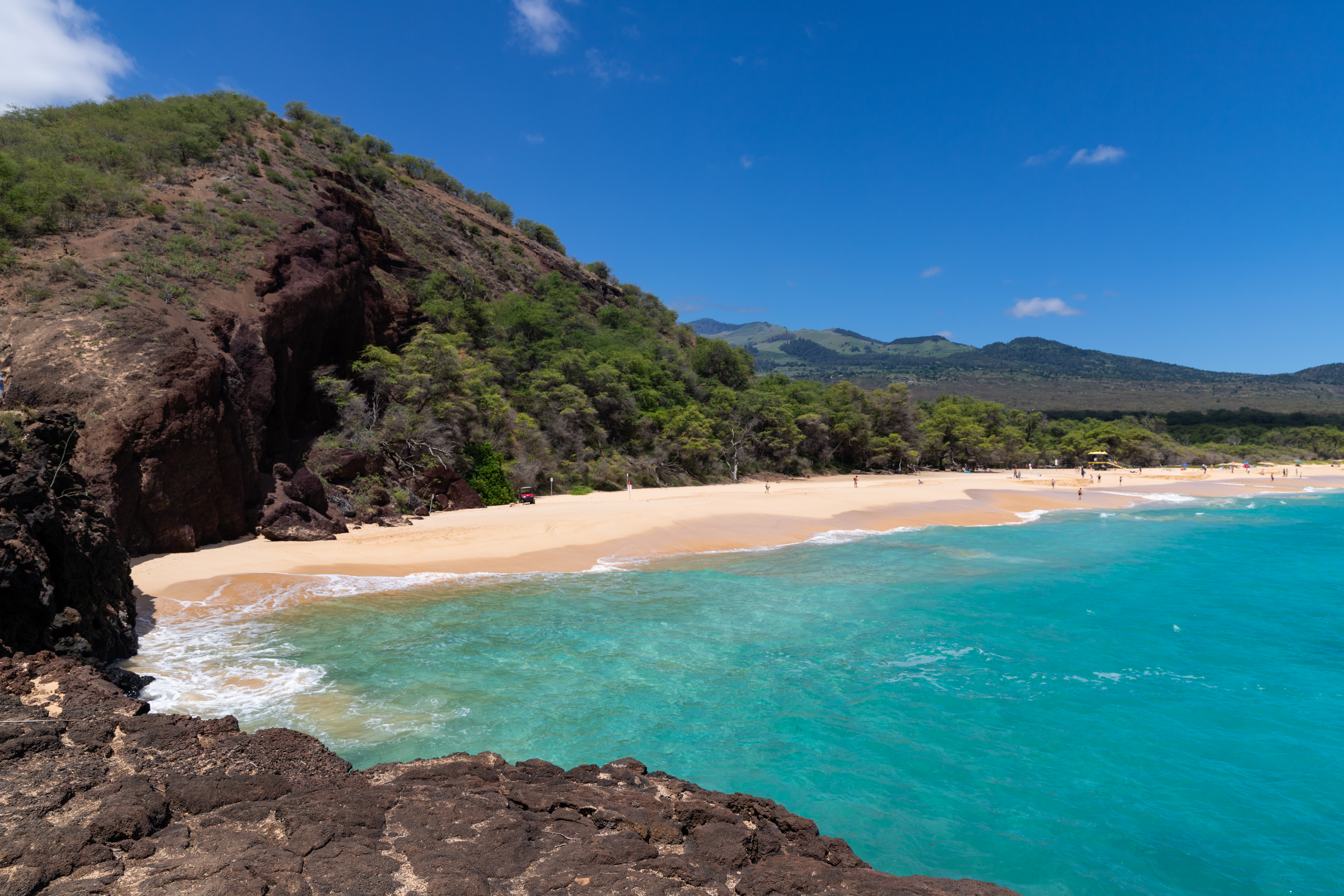
”Big Beach”

Mākena State Park is a 165-acre (0.7 km^{2}) beachside park in Makena on the island of Maui, Hawaii. Located just south of Wailea, it contains three separate beaches and a dormant volcanic cinder cone.

Big Beach, also known as "Oneloa Beach" and "Mākena Beach", is a popular spot for sunbathing and bodyboarding by both tourists and locals. Big Beach is 1.5 miles (2.4 km) long and more than 100 feet (30 m) wide. The shore is fairly protected from wind. The "Makena cloud" that stretches from the top of Haleakalā to Kahoʻolawe is often overhead, cooling the sand. The beach is informally divided into three sections based on its main three entrances, commonly referred to as "Firsts", "Seconds", and "Thirds". This informal system provided a practical way to specify specific locations along the expansive beach.

Little Beach, also known as "Puʻu Ōlaʻi Beach" is a small beach just north of Big Beach separated by a steep lava outcropping (the tip of Puʻu Ōlaʻi) and a 5-minute hike. The beach is only 660 feet (200 m) long and can be crowded at peak times. Little Beach is regarded as a nude beach and nude bathing is common there, although it is de jure illegal due to being in a state park.

Oneʻuli Beach or Naupaka Beach is a black sand beach on the northern end of the park, closest to Makena.

Puʻu Ōlaʻi is a dormant volcanic cinder cone in the center of the park with a height of 360 feet (110 m).

The park is located on Mākena Road at 20°37′52″N 156°26′46″W. Just to the south is the ʻAhihi Kinaʻu Natural Area Reserve.
