= Kekaha Kai State Park =

State park in Hawaii, United States

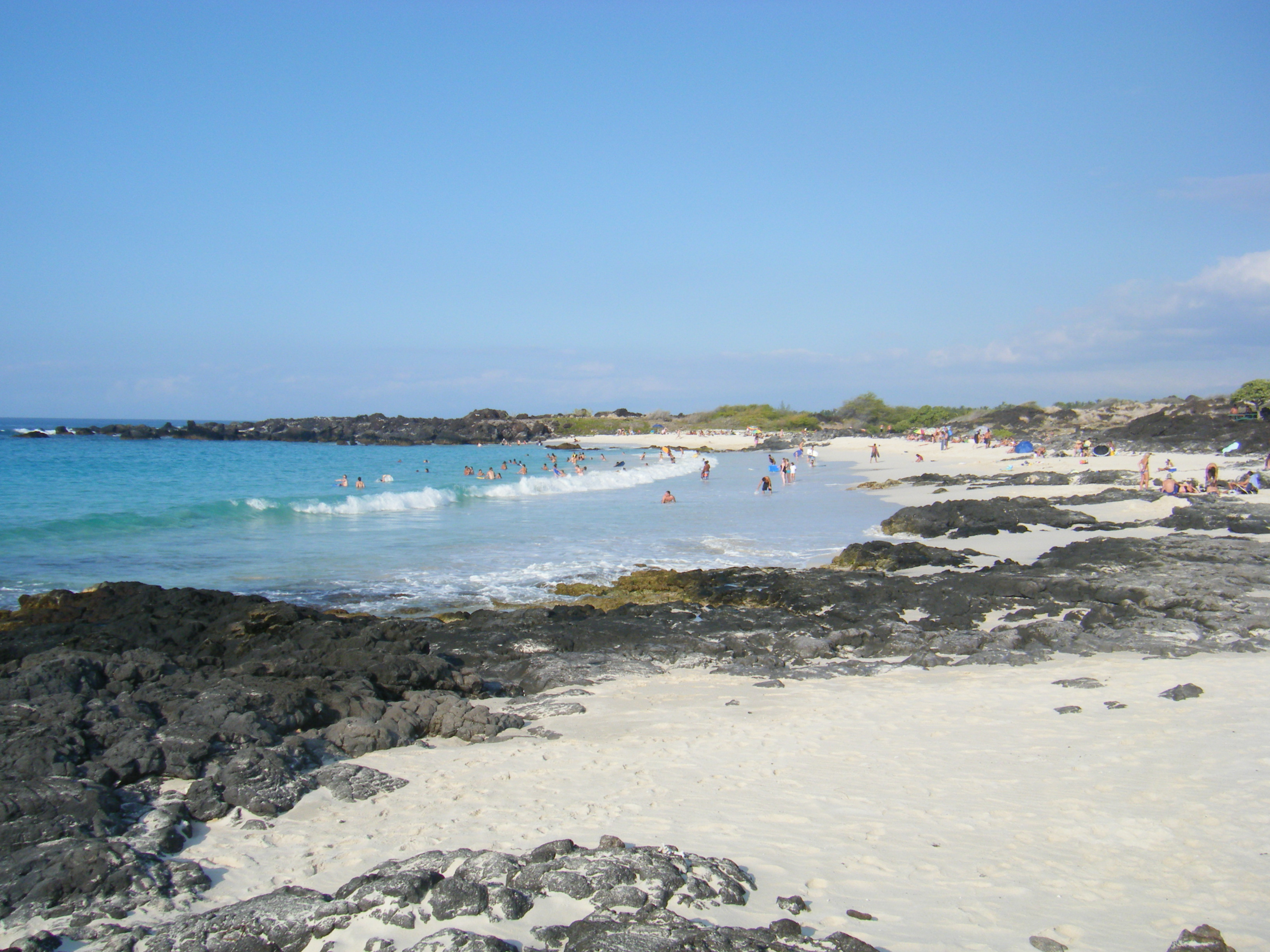
- Kua Bay in Kekaha Kai State Park

- Location within Hawaii
- Location: Hawaii, U.S.
- Nearest city: Kailua-Kona
- Coordinates: 19°47′32″N 156°1′31″W
- Governing body: Hawai'i Department of Land and Natural Resources
- Website: Hawaii State Parks

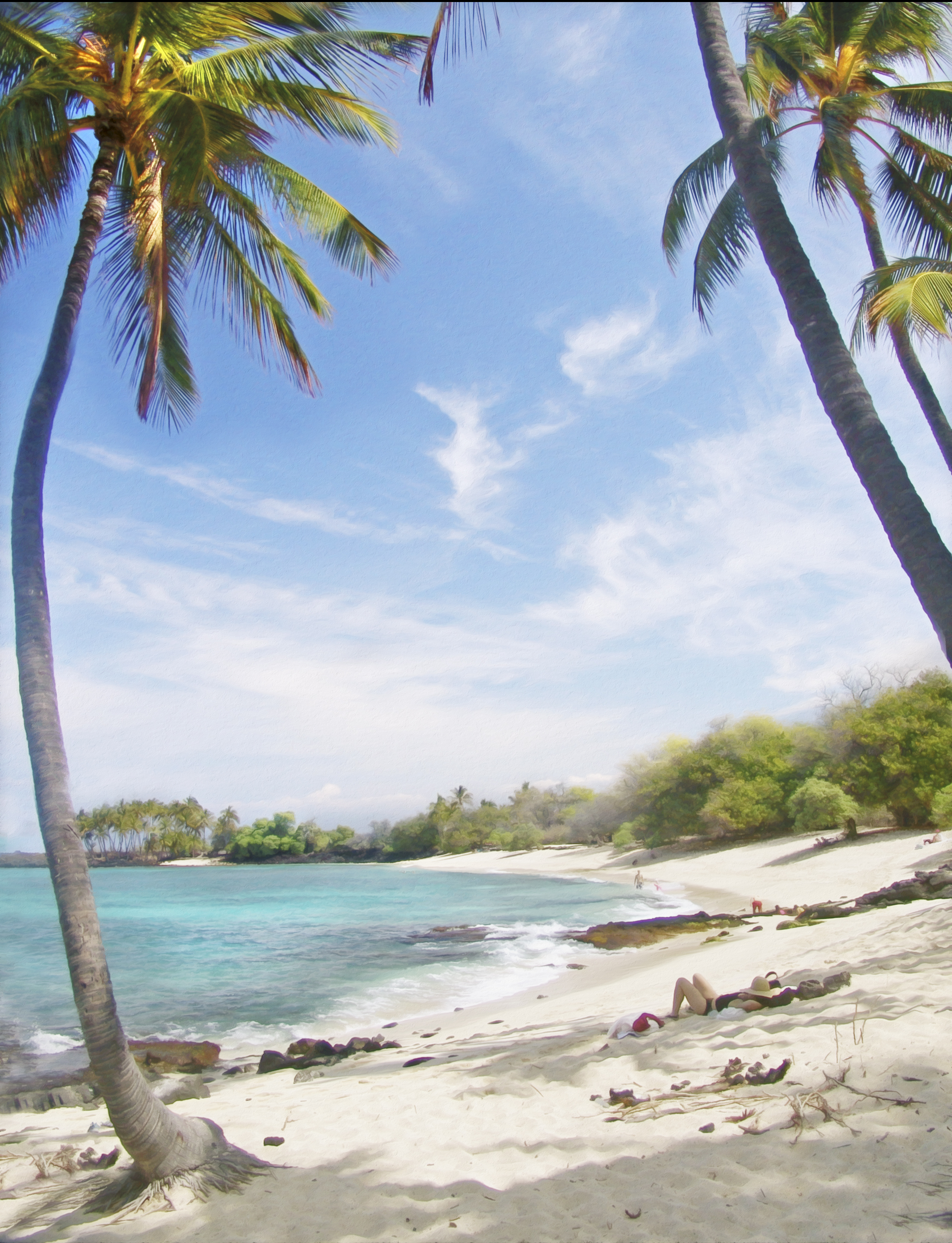

Kekaha Kai State Park, formerly known as Kona Coast State Park, is a beach park located along the north Kona coast on the island of Hawaiʻi. The main beach areas are Maniniʻowali (Kua) Bay, Makalawena beach at Puʻu Aliʻi Bay, and Mahaiʻula Bay. The park's name originates from the Hawaiian language words ke kaha kai which translate to "the shore line" in English.

== Park sections ==
The northern section of the park is on Maniniʻowali Bay located at coordinates 19°48′37″N 156°0′23″W. This beach area is popularly called Kua Bay since it is easier to pronounce. A paved road 2.6 mi (4.2 km) north of Kona International Airport leads to the beach.

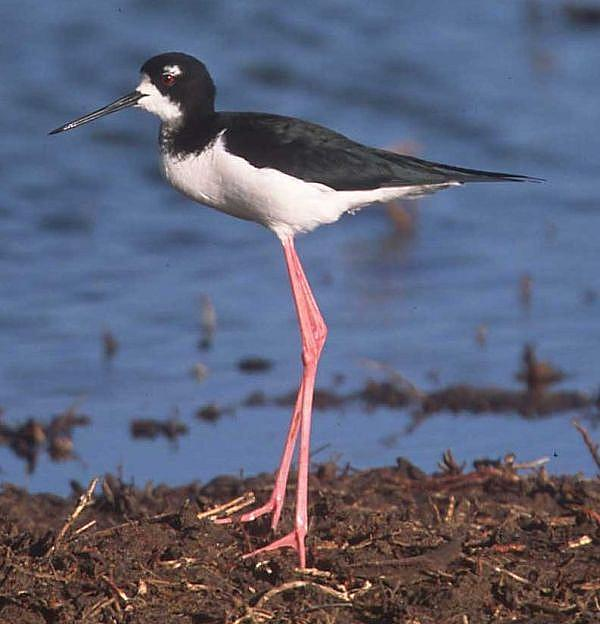
Hawaiian stilt

The wetland area behind Makalawena beach was designated a National Natural Landmark in 1972. The marsh is known as ʻŌpaeʻula Pond (Hawaiian for "red shrimp") and was the site of a small fishing village that was wiped out in the 1946 tsunami. The 12 acres (4.9 ha) of wetland provide one of the last remaining nesting grounds of the āeʻo (Hawaiian stilt, Himantopus mexicanus knudseni), the ʻalae keʻokeʻo (Hawaiian coot, Fulica alai), and the only known breeding area for the ʻaukuʻu (black-crowned night heron, Nycticorax nycticorax hoactli) in Hawaii. The pond is located at coordinates 19°47′32″N 156°1′31″W in the privately owned area between the two sections of the state park.

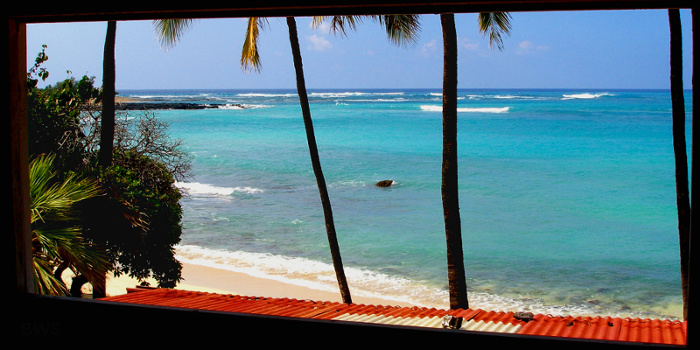
Mahai'ula Bay

Mahaiʻula Bay is accessed by an unpaved lava road which heads west off the main highway a short distance north of the airport. The Mahaiʻula section is located at coordinates 19°46′56″N 156°2′13″W and has a sandy beach with a picnic area.

A 4.5 mi (7.2 km) section of the historic Ala Kahakai coastal trail connects Mahaiʻula and Kua Bay. A hike up Puʻu Kuʻili offers a wide view of the coastline from the summit of the 342 ft-high (104 m) cinder cone.

The park is open daily from 8:00 am – 7:00 pm.
