= Secret Beach =

Beach on Kauai, Hawaii

Coordinates: 22°13′25″N 159°24′49″W

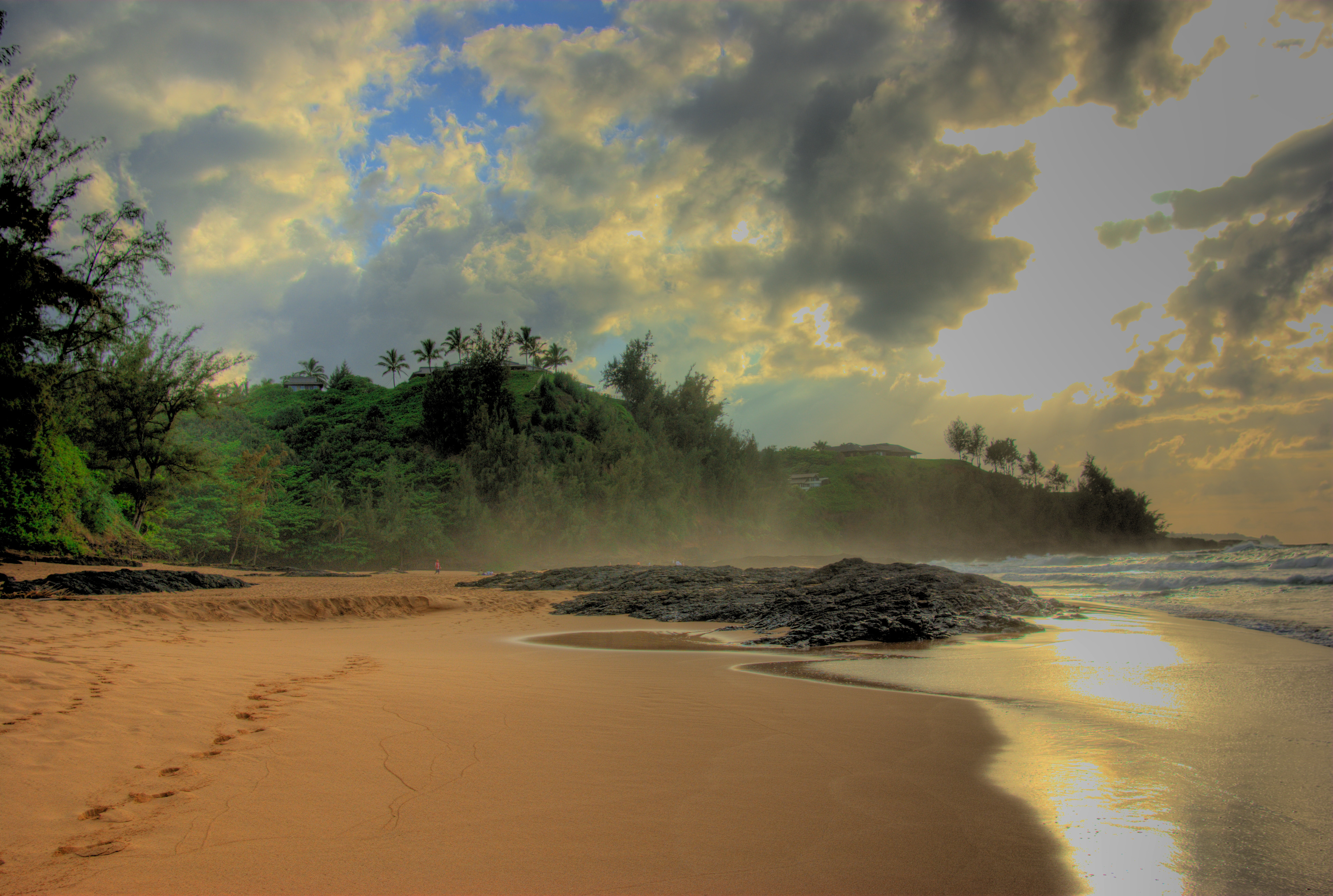
Secret Beach

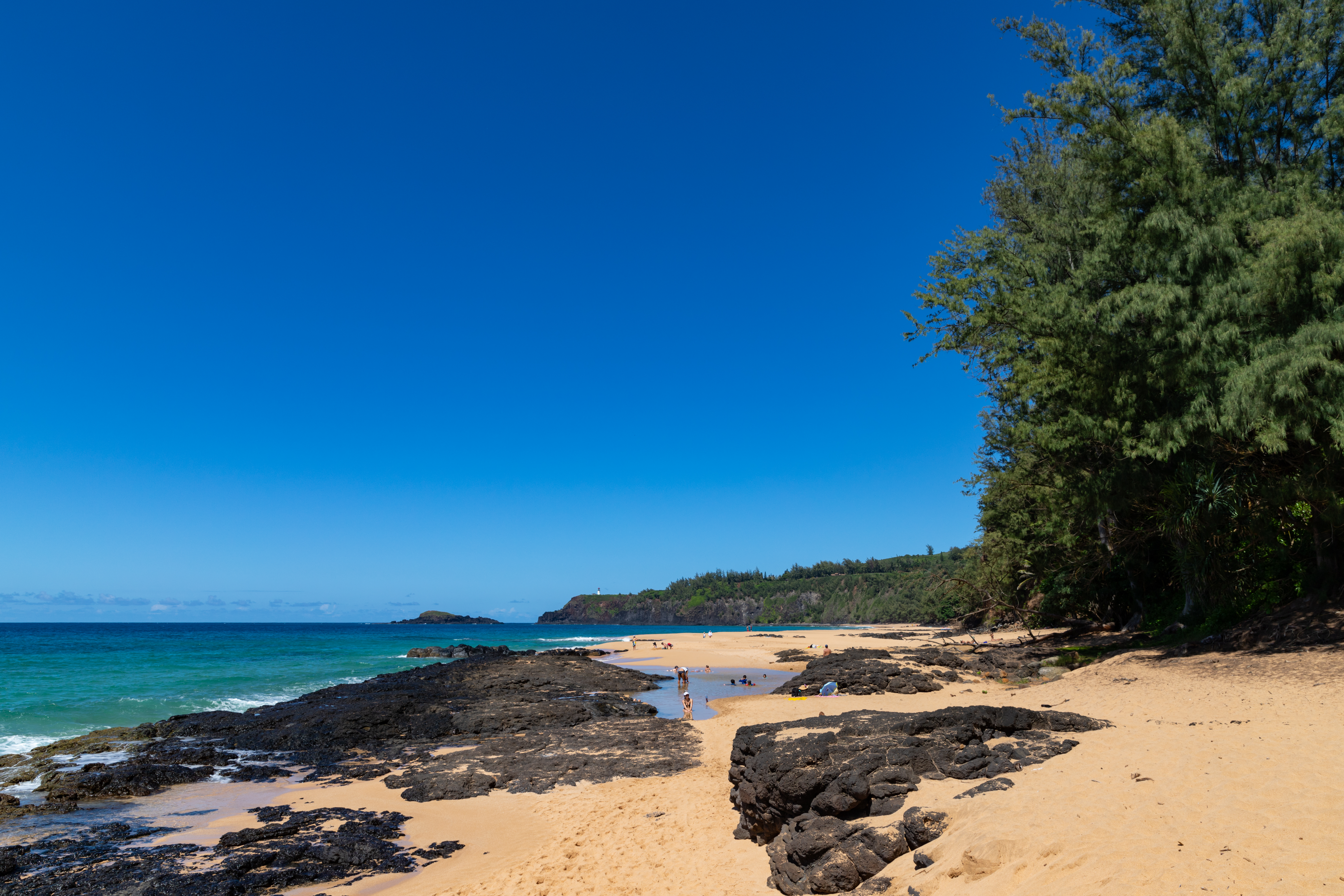
Secret Beach Kauapea on Kauai, Hawaii

Secret Beach, officially known as Kauapea Beach, is a beach in Kalihiwai and Kīlauea on the north shore of the island of Kauai, Hawaii. The beach is known for its size, seclusion, and natural beauty.

== Location ==
Secret Beach is located approximately half a mile northwest of the town of Kilauea, situated between the Kīlauea Lighthouse and Kalihiwai Valley. True to its name, the beach is not easily accessible, with no public roads leading directly to it.

== Topography ==
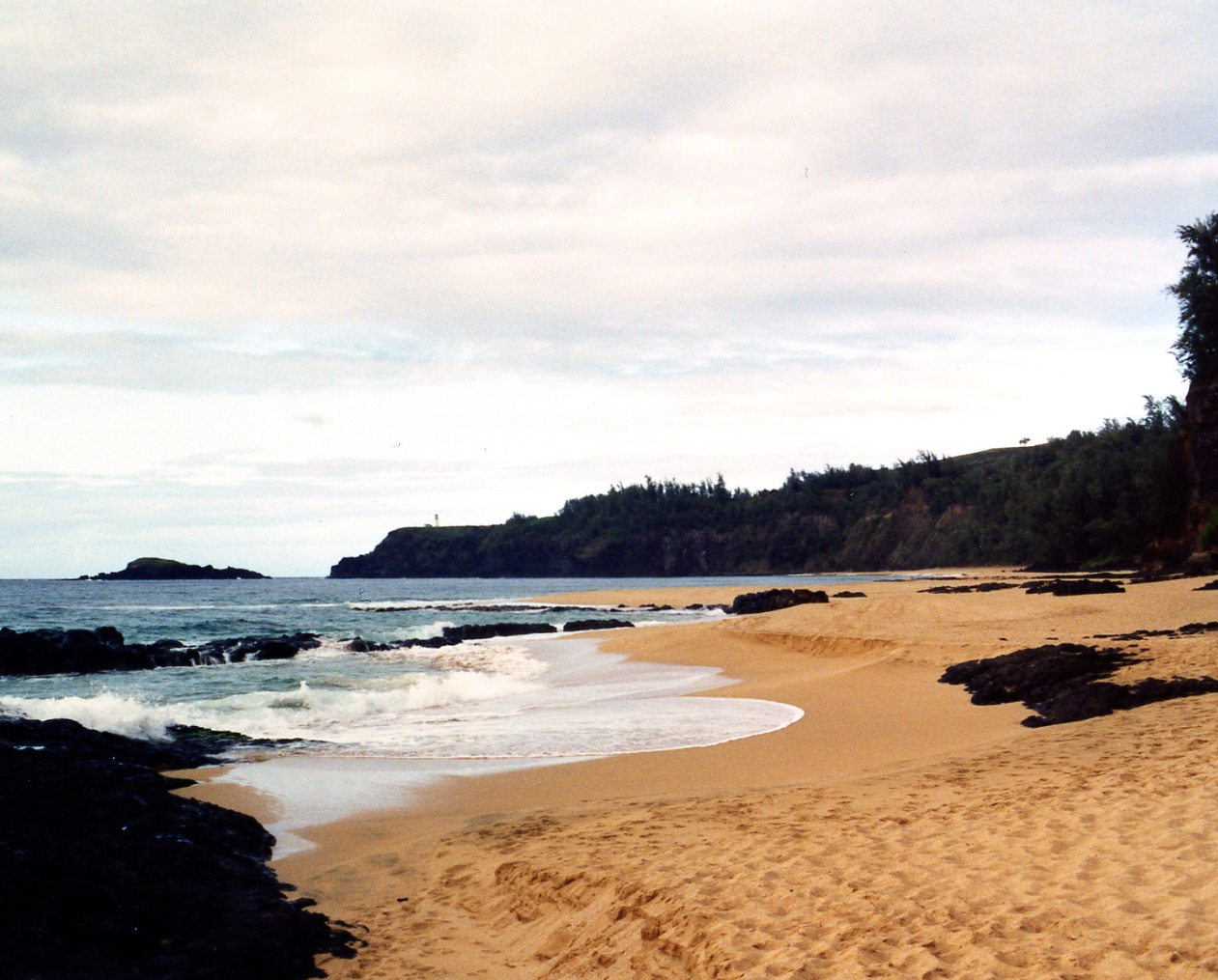
Secret Beach looking toward Kilauea Lighthouse

Secret Beach is relatively large by Hawaiian standards, measuring approximately 3,000 feet long and 75 feet wide. Its surface is predominantly covered with fine white sand interspersed with outcrops of black lava rock. Those outcrops typically separate Kauapea into First Beach, Second Beach and Third Beach. The beach's seclusion and beauty are enhanced by the cliff backdrop and the brilliant turquoise-colored ocean water. The cliff face, particularly at the east and west ends, consists of sheer red and black rock. Where the gradient is less steep, the cliffs are covered with lush vegetation, including ironwood trees, taro plants, and other tropical flora. Several small cascading waterfalls can also be found along the cliffs.

To the east, Kīlauea Lighthouse is clearly visible atop a cliff overlooking Moku‘ae‘ae Island. About a quarter mile beyond the west end of the beach is a substantial waterfall that plunges approximately 15 feet into the Pacific Ocean.

The ocean floor is mostly sand-covered and its descent is steep.

== Activities ==
Water conditions at the beach vary by season. Although the beach is accessible year round, swimming is only advisable in the summer and even then swimming can be risky when the surf is high or rough because of strong, unpredictable currents. In winter the surf is turbulent and dangerous; accordingly, swimming is not recommended for anyone who is inexperienced under these conditions.

Other beach activities include picnicking, seashell hunting, surfing, sunbathing, snorkeling, and fishing. Also tidal lagoons form on the west end of the beach, offering a kind of kiddie pool. There are no facilities at the beach, so visitors must bring their own food and beverages.

== Naturism ==
For many year, Secret Beach attracted nude sunbathers but that has ended. Larson’s Beach is the only beach on Kauai that is frequented by nudists.
