= Wailua, Maui County, Hawaii =

Unincorporated community in Hawaii, United States

Wailua, Hawaii
- Unincorporated community
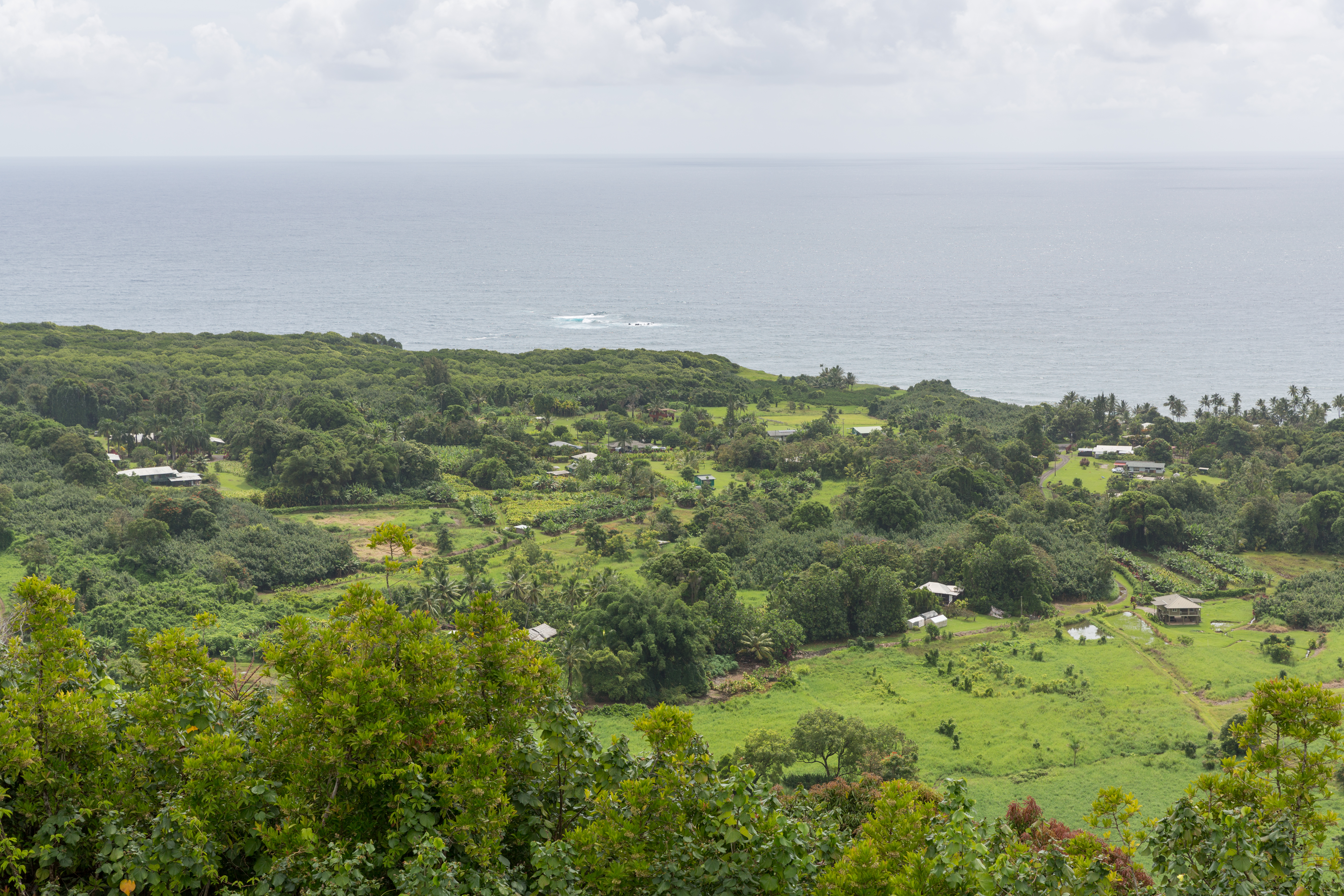
- Wailua from Keʻanae Valley Lookout Park

- Location in Hawaii
- Coordinates: 20°50′47″N 156°8′5″W
- Country: United States
- State: Hawaii
- County: Maui
- Time zone: UTC−10 (Hawaii–Aleutian)
- ZIP codes: 96713

Wailua is an unincorporated community in Maui County on the island of Maui in the state of Hawaii.

Wailua shares the ZIP code of 96713 with Keanae and Hana.
