= Mauna Lahilahi =

Mountain in Honolulu County, Hawaii, United States

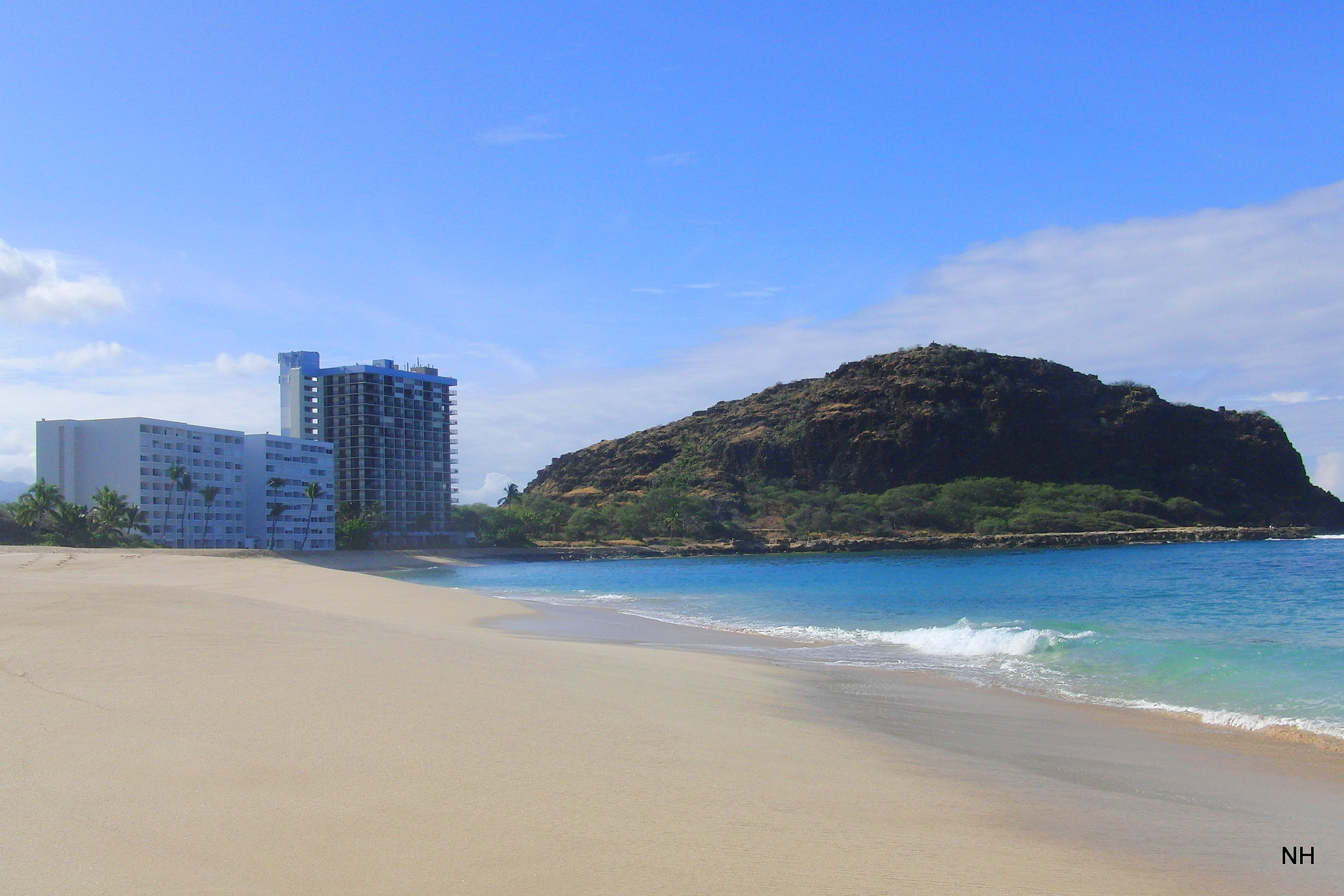
- Mauna Lahilahi on the right side, with parts of Mākaha town on the left

Highest point
- Elevation: 230 ft (70 m)
- Prominence: 230 ft (70 m)
- Coordinates: 21°27′37″N 158°12′47″W

Geography
- Location within Oahu Location within Hawaii
- Location: Honolulu County, Hawaii, United States
- Parent range: Waianae Range

Mauna Lahilahi is a small eroded mountain located on the Hawaiian island of Oahu near Mākaha town. It has an elevation of 230 ft (70 m).

Its name means “thin mountain” in the Hawaiian language, although the “Lahilahi” part was named after Chief Lahilahi, who ruled over the Mākaha area.

== History ==
=== Legends ===
According to Hawaiian legend, the mountain was sacred to Kane, who is the god of protection and one of the four main Hawaiian deities. Another Hawaiian god named Aiʻai used the area around Mauna Lahilahi for fishing.

=== Ancient Hawaiʻi ===
In Ancient Hawaii, Mauna Lahilahi was used as a lookout point for any boats passing through Oahu's western shoreline (Waianae).

=== Astronomy ===
It is believed that the mountain has astronomical significance due to its ties with the summer solstice.

== Hike ==
The hike up Mauna Lahilahi is considered to be dangerous due to its rocky terrain. The government does not sanction any official trails up the mountain, meaning it's technically off-limits. Despite this, some people still climb up to the 230 foot summit.

== See also ==
- Waiʻanae Range, its parent range
- Mākaha, Hawaii, the town next to it
