= Red Sand Beach =

Kaihalulu Beach, Maui, Hawaii, US

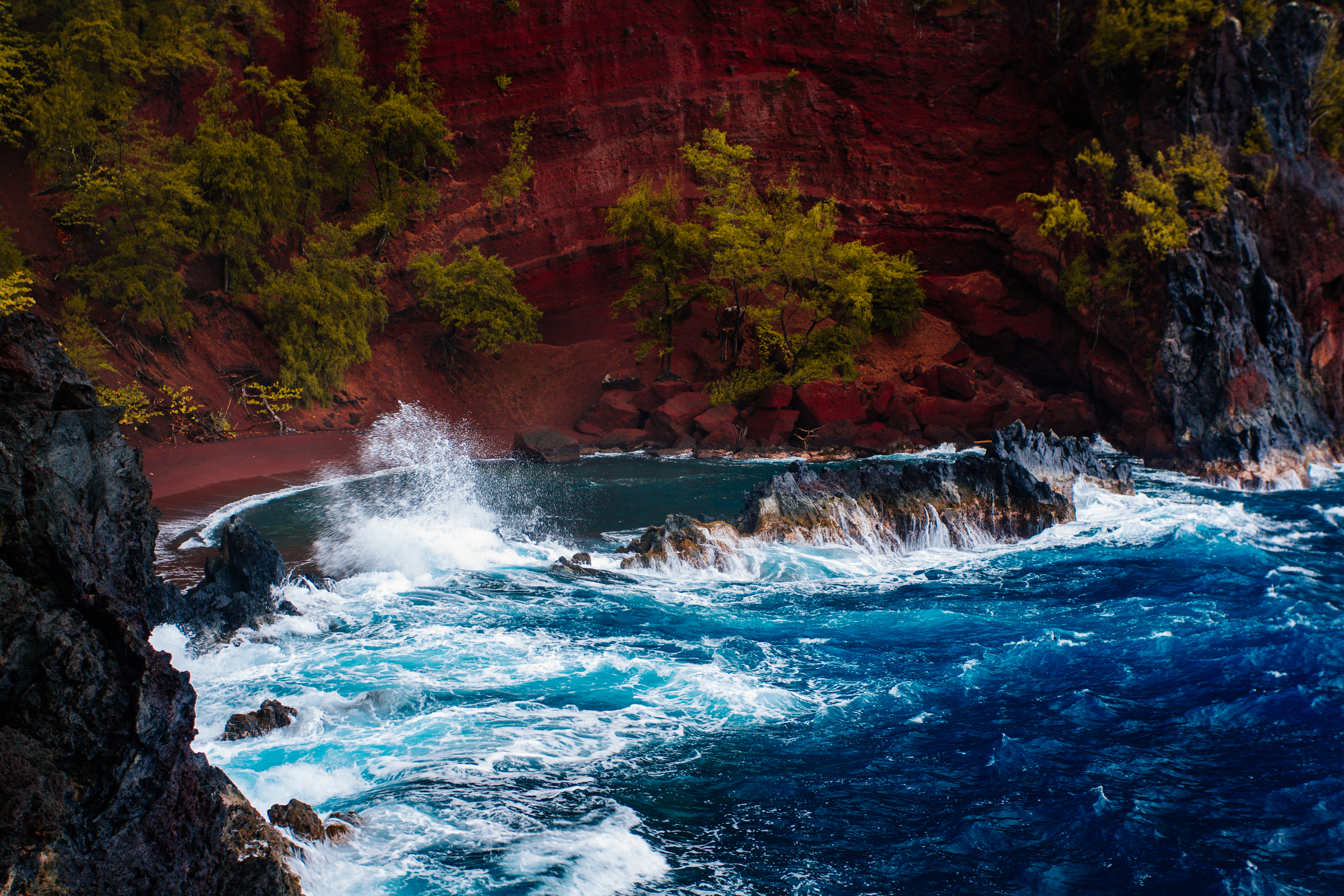
- Red Sand Beach and Kaihalulu Bay, Maui

- Location within Hawaii
- Coordinates: 20°45′8″N 155°58′54″W
- Type: Pocket beach
- Parking: Accessible by trail

Red Sand Beach, a.k.a. Kaihalulu Beach, is a pocket beach located on Kaihalulu Bay. It is on the island of Maui, Hawaii, on Kaʻuiki Head.

== Location ==
Kaihalulu Bay and Red Sand Beach lie on the side of Ka'uiki Head, which is a cinder cone just south of Hana Bay, on the eastern coast of Maui island. The bay name comes from kai halulu which means "roaring sea" in the Hawaiian language. The hill name comes from ka ʻuiki which means "the glimmer". It was the site of a fortress and temple (heiau) where several battles were fought against invaders from Hawaiʻi island. It was also the birthplace of powerful civil leader Queen Kaʻahumanu.

Red Sand Beach is partially shielded from the rough open ocean by an offshore reef. The result is a natural sea wall that protects the bay from large waves. Kaihalulu is one of the few red sand beaches in the world. The sand is a deep red-black, which contrasts with the blue water, the black sea wall, and the green ironwood trees. The cinder cone behind the beach erodes constantly, which continually enlarges the cove. This hill is rich in iron and is why the beach's sand is such a deep red.

Kaihalulu is extremely isolated and requires a fairly short, yet perilous hike to reach. The trail to the beach crosses over private property and follows a ridge high above the ocean below. Signs warn visitors that no trespassing is allowed and the path is rather steep and narrow and is quite slippery due to the loose and crumbling cinder as well as needles from nearby ironwood trees. The trail also passes by an ancient Japanese cemetery. Because of the beach's isolation and difficult access, some visitors consider it to be clothing optional.
