= Slaughterhouse Beach (Mokuleʻia) =

Beach in Maui

Coordinates: 21.0111°N 156.6422°W

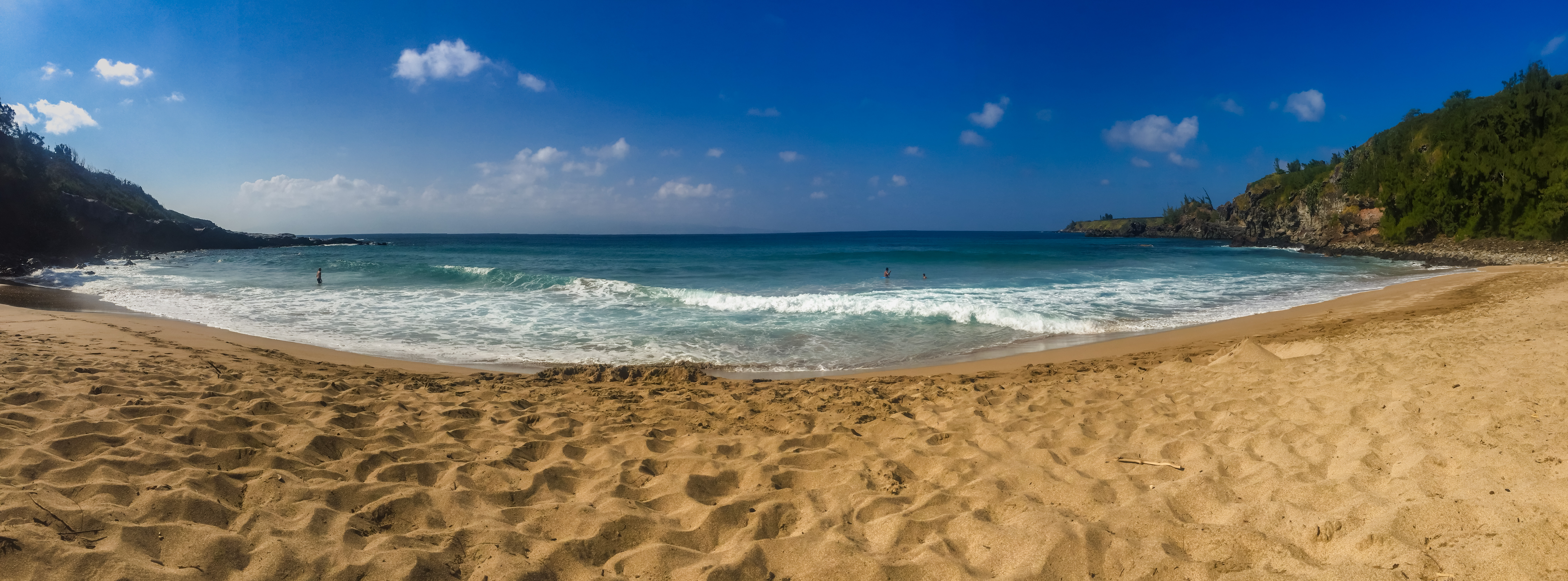
Slaughterhouse Beach (Mokuleʻia)

Slaughterhouse Beach or "Mokuleʻia Beach," is a sand beach in Maui. It is located off of Rte. 30 in Mokuleʻia Bay, directly east of Fleming Beach and directly west of Honolua Bay. The beach is a part of the Honolua-Mokuleʻia Bay Marine Life Conservation District.

== Geography ==
The beach is located near Kapalua in West Maui and is surrounded by a cliff face and lava rock. The name "slaughterhouse" derives from the Honolua Ranch slaughterhouse and tanning/storage shed that were located on the cliff’s edge above the ocean. The buildings were torn down in the 1960s, but the name remains. In contrast, the Hawaiian name Mokule’ia means “district of abundance." Because the area is a protected marine preserve, fishing and spearing are not allowed and harming or taking any marine life is prohibited.

== Winter ==
In the winter, the beach's waves are typically very large and often dangerous, though experts frequently use the beach for surfing and bodyboarding. Large waves break approximately two hundred feet out from the shoreline during the winter. There is also a hidden sandbar that is located about one hundred feet from the shore where it seems you may easily swim out to this sandbar and stand in approximately 3 feet (0.91 m) of water. You may be tempted to swim out to this sandbar if you see experienced local people swimming out to it. The local swimmers that swim out may be wearing scuba flippers on their feet which may give them enough control to swim in the strong water. However, the water is deep before the sandbar can be reached, and the shape of the beach, and the sandbar seems to cause a very strong and dangerous rip tide that sweeps from right to left, and even an expert or advanced intermediate swimmer could be quickly swept onto the rocks, or out to sea. This risk could not be underestimated in the winter. There are no signs or warnings of any kind on the beach, so extreme caution should be exercised as this is a very serious and unseen danger.

== Summer ==
In the summer, the surf is lower which allows for more water activities such as snorkeling and swimming.
