= Haʻula Beach =

Beach on the island of Kauai, Hawaii

Coordinates: 21.901944°N 159.406667°W

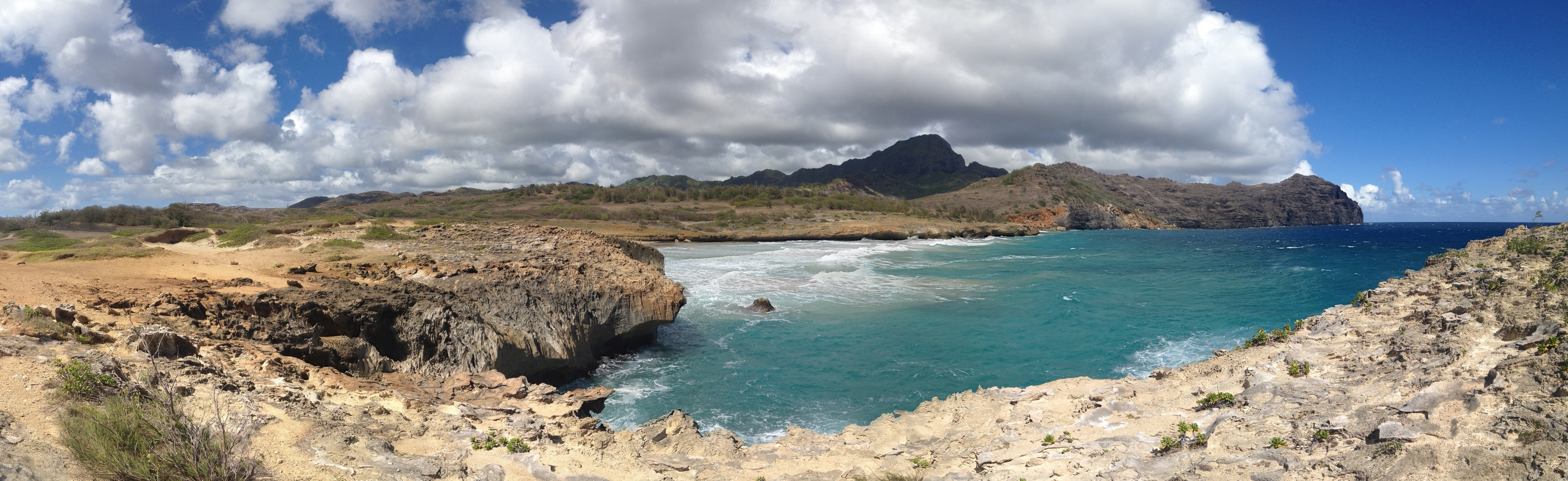
A panoramic view of Haʻula Beach, the most eastern part of Mahaulepu Beach

Ha'ula Beach is a beach on the southeast coast of the island of Kauai in the Hawaiian Islands. It sits at the center of a large cove with a low, flat rock shelf fronting the rest of the beach. Behind the beach are the highest sand dunes on the south shore. The rocky offshore bottom and surf preclude swimming in the cove. This shoreline is prized for its beauty and solitude. The beach is occasionally visited by fishermen, trail riders, and Hawaiian monk seals.
