= D.T. Fleming Beach =

Beach in Maui, Hawaii, United States

Coordinates: 21.005°N 156.6509°W

Fleming Beach is a public beach in the northwest region of Maui, Hawaii maintained and staffed by Maui County at D.T. Fleming Park. Fleming Beach was named America's Best Beach in 2003 and is a popular surfing and bodyboarding site.

== Overview ==
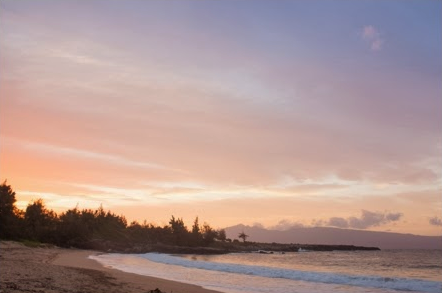
D.T. Fleming Beach in Maui, Hawaii at Sunset.

Fleming Beach is located in Kapalua just west of Slaughterhouse Beach and Mokule'ia Bay. The beach is named after D.T. Fleming, the man who introduced pineapple to West Maui. Fleming Beach is staffed with lifeguards and shares facilities with D.T. Fleming Park, including: a parking lot, picnic tables, grills, restrooms, outdoor showers, wheelchair ramps, pay phones, lifeguard offices, a comfort station, and water taps. The beach is frequented by both locals and tourists and is popular with surfers and bodyboarders because of its large winter swells. In addition to the large swells, the beach frequently has strong rip currents and dangerous waves. It also serves as the main beach front for the Ritz-Carlton, Kapalua.

== Awards ==
Fleming Beach was named the "Best Beach in America" in 2006 and is frequently included on lists of the best beaches in the world.

== Media ==
A live weather and surf feed is maintained for Fleming Beach at Surf-Forecast.com.
