= Maui Film Festival =

Film festival in Hawaii

- Location: Maui, Hawaii
- Founded: 2000; 26 years ago
- Founded by: Barry Rivers
- Disestablished: 2025
- Festival date: June, July
- Website: Official website

The Maui Film Festival was a film festival founded in 2000 by Barry Rivers and held annually on the island of Maui, Hawaii through 2024. It was based at Grand Wailea Resort and included film premieres, filmmaker panels, special screenings, tributes, award ceremonies, culinary arts celebrations, and private soirees.

Attendees of the festival through the years included Bryan Cranston, Freida Pinto, Connie Britton, Pierce Brosnan, Clint Eastwood, Claire Danes, Megan Fox, Andrew Garfield, Olivia Wilde, Garrett Hedlund, and filmmaker Jack McCoy.

== History ==
The festival was created by current festival director Barry Rivers, who has a doctorate in electronic media arts and studied Film & Media Arts at University of Massachusetts Amherst. The festival originated from a weekly screening series that Rivers began in 1997.

In 2000, the festival was officially held for the first time. In 2001, the festival was held from June 13 through June 17 in Wailea, Hawaii.

In 2017, the 18th festival was held in Wailea and Kahului and included more than 30 film screenings.

In 2020, during the COVID-19 pandemic, the Maui Film Festival was delayed. In January 2021, the 70 participating films were made available online as the Speed-of-Light Virtual Cinema from January 1 through 3. The festival donated all money received from the second wave of film submissions to the Maui Food Bank, resulting in a donation of over $7,000.

In 2022, the in-person festival was held at the Stardust Cinema at the Maui Arts and Cultural Center from July 6 - July 10. The Speed-of-Light Virtual Cinema was also available from July 6 - July 31.

In 2023, the festival was held on June 28 - July 2. The Speed-of-Light Virtual Cinema was also available from July 3 - July 30. After the 2023 Hawaii wildfires badly affected Maui and destroyed the village of Lahaina, Rivers and his family donated to and participated in the recovery efforts.

In 2025, it was announced that the film festival would not continue, making the 2024 Maui Film Festival the last.

== Program ==
The festival consisted of filmmakers submitting features and shorts which the programmers chose 50 of to be screened over the five-day program. The festival also honored selected filmmakers, actors, and actresses with awards for various criteria within the film industry.

The festival began with an Opening Night Twilight Reception at Grand Wailea Resort.

During the 2023 festival, there were 11 local and international film premieres. From July 3 to 30, 50 short and feature films were made available to stream online.

== Venues ==
The festival is predominantly held at the open-air Stardust Cinema at the Maui Arts & Cultural Center's A&B Amphitheater. Films are also projected onto a 50-foot screen set on the slopes of Haleakala at the Wailea Gold and Emerald Golf Courses.

On June 14, 2018, a special "Toes in the Sand Cinema" event took place at Wailea Beach in front of the Four Seasons Resort Maui, during which short films were screened.

Starting in 2021, online viewing was made possible by the Speed-of-Light Virtual Cinema. People who could not attend in person could purchase tickets to stream films from around the world.

== Awards and honors ==
Lights! Camera! Passion! Award - Honors directors.

Winners include:

- Olivia Wilde in 2019
- Louie Psihoyos in 2015
- Rob Reiner in 2003

Maverick Award - Honors individuals who have "the courage of their convictions and spares no effort to do the right thing to help those whose life’s work inspires him."

Winners include:

- Pierce Brosnan in 2008
- Shep Gordon in 2014
- Willie Nelson in 2009

Navigator Award - Honors film actors and actresses for “carving a path of distinction through the turbulent waters of the entertainment industry without sacrificing their fundamental commitment to excellence”

Winners include:

- Gina Rodriguez in 2019

Nova Award - Honors film artists "whose stunningly original and seamless performances consistently infuse each character they play with unique insight and wisdom."

Winners include:

- Jessica Chastain in 2013
- Paul Rudd in 2019
- Zooey Deschanel in 2009
- Felicity Huffman
- Claire Danes

Pathfinder Award - Honors actors and actresses whose choices and performances encourage people to expand what it means to be human.

Winners include:

- Pierce Brosnan in 2017 (first two-time honoree at the festival also winning the Maverick Award in 2008)

Rainmaker Award - Honors film artists who affect their projects, both on and off screen.

Winners include:

- Michael B. Jordan in 2016

Rising Star Award - Honors young actors and actresses.

Winners include:

- Garrett Hedlund in 2011
- Karen Gillan in 2017
- Nick Robinson in 2018
- Maya Erskine in 2019
- Annie Gonzalez in 2023

Shining Star Award - Honors film actors and actresses who "dares to dream big dreams and delivers brilliantly charismatic and revelatory performances every time that opportunity knocks."

Winners include:

- Zac Efron
- Andrew Garfield
- Olivia Wilde
- Emma Roberts
- Amber Heard in 2018
- Awkwafina in 2019
- Yara Shahidi in 2023
- Adam Driver
- Jake Gyllenhaal
- Freida Pinto

Shooting Star Award - Honors an actor in a Maui Film Festival Hawaii Premiere.

Winners include:

- Joe Manganiello in 2019

Stella Award - Honors an actress for "advancing the status of women throughout the film industry by breathing life into characters that empower, enlighten and entertain."

Winners include:

- Geena Davis in 2003 (inaugural winner)

Visionary Award - Honors film artists for their "long-standing commitment to inspire and nurture the endlessly evolving tapestry of global cultures into an ever more compassionate and life-affirming planetary community."

Winners include:

- Louie Schwartzberg in 2019
- His Holiness, the Dalai Lama
