= Golf clubs and courses in Hawaii =

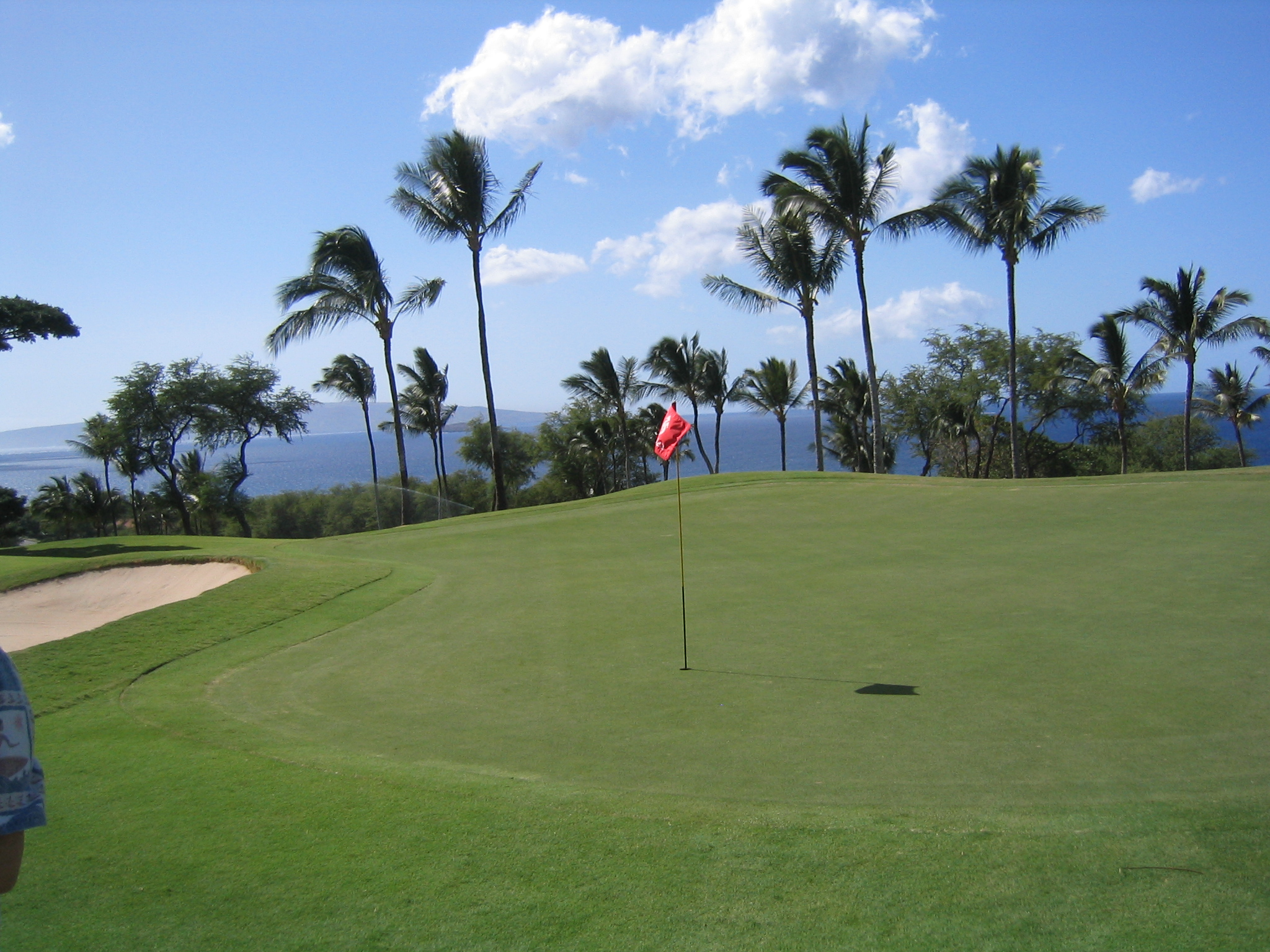
Wailea Gold Golf Course on Maui

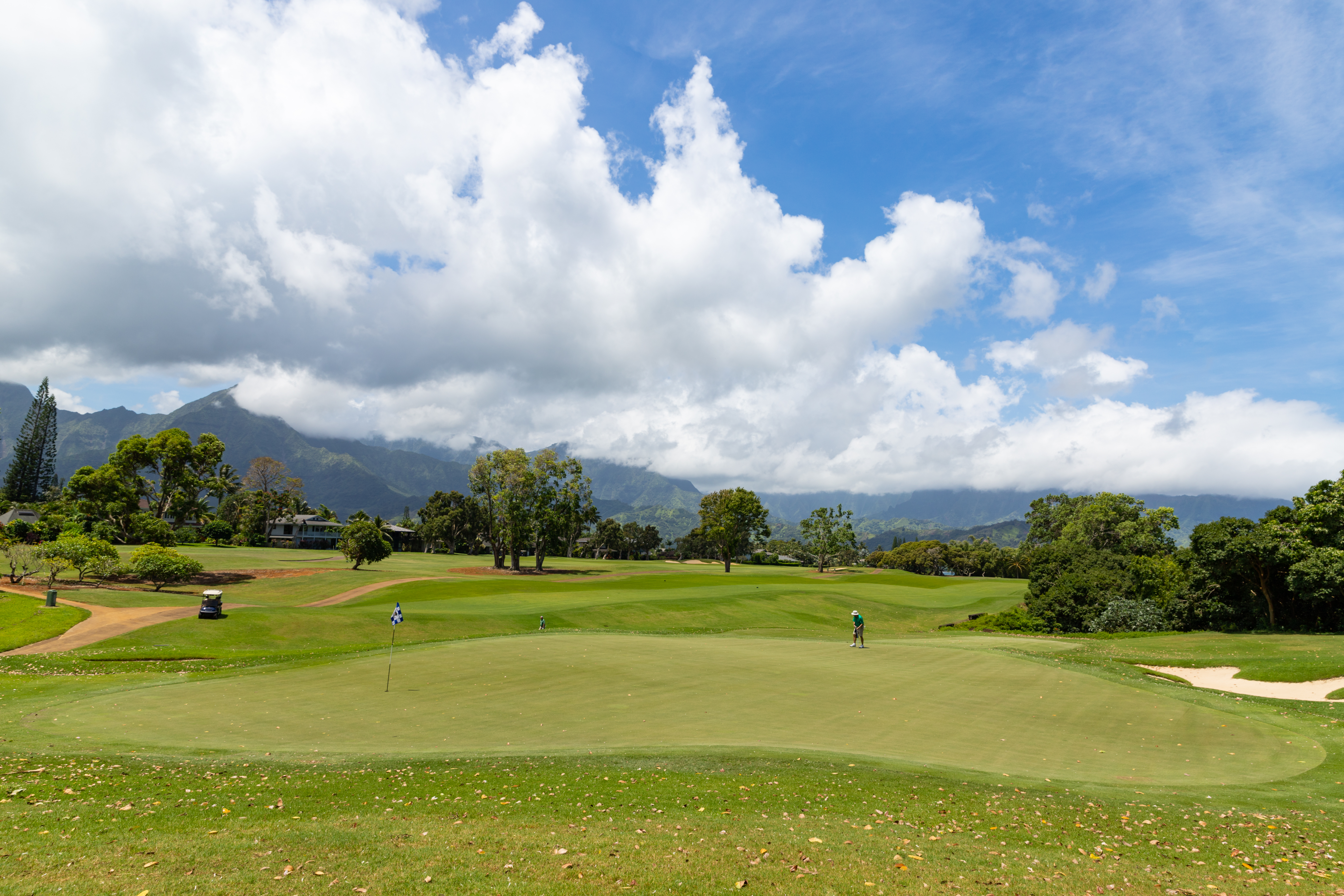
Golf course in Princeville, Kauai, Hawaii

There are 75 golf courses in Hawaii.

== Oahu ==
Oahu has 37 golf clubs:

=== Public ===
- Bay View G.C., Kaneohe (Par 60) – Open for night play weeknights
- Coral Creek G.C.
- Ewa Beach G.C.
- Hawaii Country Club, Wahiawa
- Hawaii Kai G.C. (Championship Course • Executive Course (9 hole Par 3)). Designed by William Bell and Robert Trent Jones, Sr.
- Hawaii Prince G.C. (A Nines • B Nines • C Nines)
- Kapolei G.C. – host to the Pacific Links Hawai'i Championship
- Ke'alohi G.C., Hickam Course
- Ko Olina G.C. – host to the LPGA Lotte Championship
- Ko'olau G.C., Kaneohe
- Makaha Valley Country Club, Mākaha Valley
- Mililani G.C.
- Olomana Golf Links
- Pearl Country Club
- Royal Hawaiian G.C., Kailua (formerly known as Luana Hills)
- Royal Kunia Country Club, Waipahu
- Waikele Country Club, Waipahu
- Turtle Bay Resort (George Fazio Course • Arnold Palmer Course), Kahuku – host to the SBS Open at Turtle Bay and Turtle Bay Championship

=== Private ===
- Barbers Point G.C.
- Hoakalei Country Club At Ocean Pointe
- Honolulu Country Club
- Kaneohe Klipper Marine G.C.
- Kalakaua G.C.
- Leilehua G.C.
- Mamala Bay G.C.
- Mid Pacific Country Club
- Moanalua G.C. (9 hole, semi-private) – First golf course in Hawaii, built in 1898.
- Navy-Marine G.C.
- Walter J. Nagorski G.C. (9 hole)
- Oahu Country Club
- Waialae Country Club – host to the Sony Open in Hawaii

=== Municipal ===
- Ala Wai G.C., Kapahulu
- Ewa Villages G.C.
- Kahuku G.C., Kahuku. (9 hole) – The closest course on Oahu to a real links seaside layout
- Pali Municipal G.C.
- Ted Makalena G.C.
- West Loch Municipal G.C.

== Big Island ==
The island of Hawaii has 16 golf clubs:

- Hamakua Country Club, Hamakua (9 Hole)
- Hapuna G.C., Kohala Coast. Designed by Arnold Palmer and Ed Seay.
- Hualālai G.C. (Hualālai course • Ke'olu course), Kailua-Kona Designed by Jack Nicklaus. – host to the Mitsubishi Electric Championship at Hualalai
- Kona Country Club (Mountain Course • Ocean Course), Kona
- Makani Golf Club (formerly Big Island Country Club), Kailua-Kona
- Makalei G.C., Kona
- Mauna Kea G.C., Kohala Coast. Designed by Robert Trent Jones, Sr.
- Mauna Lani Resort (North Course • South Course), Kohala Coast
- Naniloa Country Club, Hilo (9 Hole)
- Sea Mountain G.C. (closed), Pahala.
- Volcano Golf and Country Club – Hawaii's highest course, situated at over 4,200 feet (adding 10-25 yards to every swing). Only a mile from Kilauea Volcano and Halemaʻumaʻu.
- Waikoloa G.C. (Beach Course • Kings' Course), Waikoloa Beach. Designed by Robert Trent Jones, Jr. (1981).
- Waikoloa Village G.C., Waikoloa Village. Designed by Robert Trent Jones, Jr.

=== Private ===
- Hokuli'a G.C., Kailua-Kona. Designed by Jack Nicklaus.
- Kukio G.C. (18-hole course • 10-hole course), Kailua-Kona. Designed by Tom Fazio.
- Nanea G.C., Kailua-Kona

=== Municipal ===
- Hilo Municipal G.C., Hilo

== Maui ==
The island of Maui has 10 golf clubs:

- The Dunes at Maui Lani, Kahului
- Elleair G.C., Kihei
- Ka'anapali G.C. (Kai Course • Royal Course), Kaanapali. – host to the Wendy's Champions Skins Game
- Kahili G.C., Wailuku
- Kapalua G.C. (Bay Course • Plantation Course), Kapalua – host to the Hyundai Tournament of Champions
- King Kamehameha G.C., Wailuku
- Makena G.C., Wailea-Makena
- Pukalani G.C., Pukalani
- Wailea G.C. (Emerald Course • Gold Course • Blue Course), Wailea – former host to the LPGA Skins Game

=== Municipal ===
- Waiehu Golf Course – hosted the USGA Amateur Links Championship in 1996

== Kauai ==
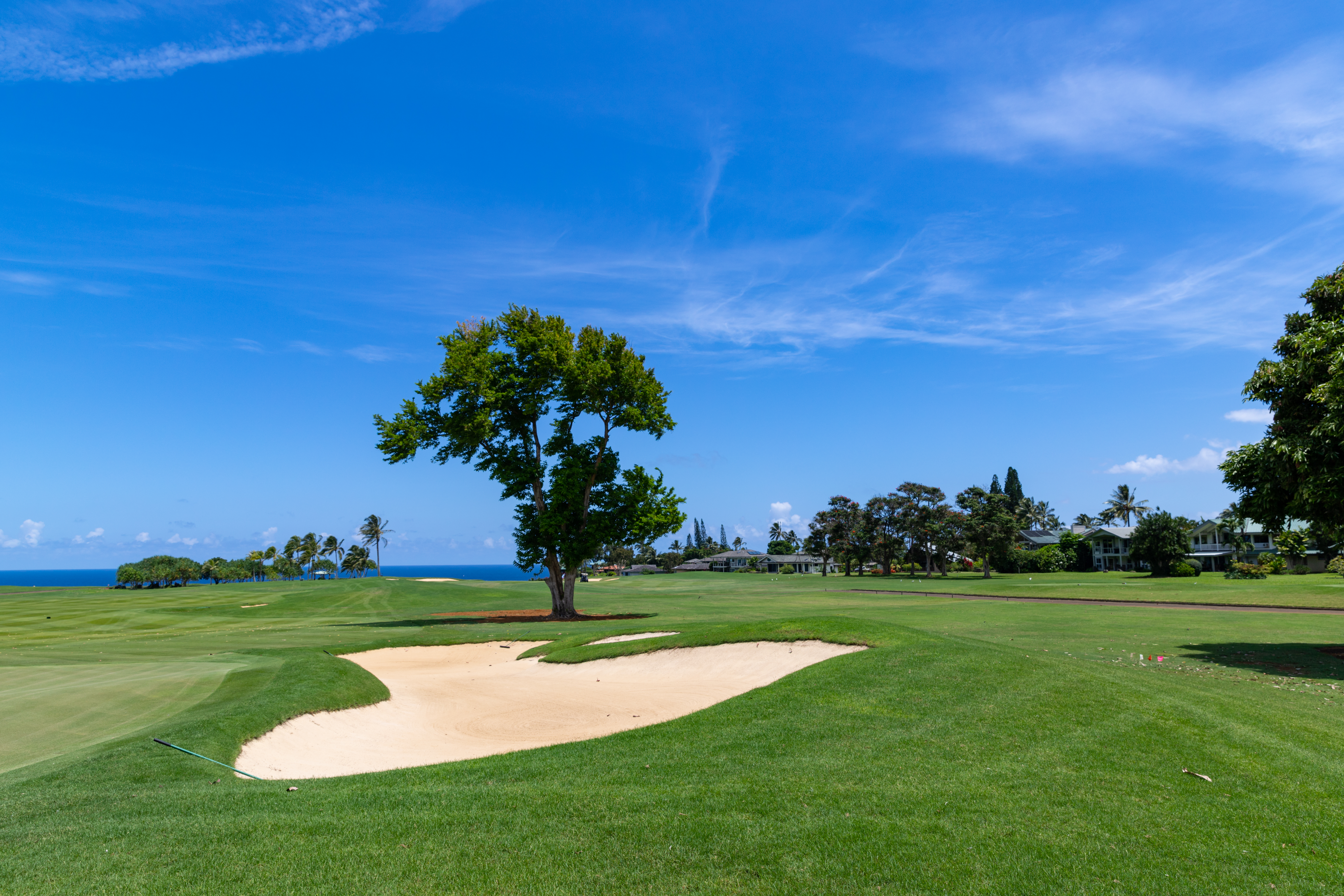
Makai Golf Club in Princeville, Kauai, Hawaii

The island of Kauai has 8 golf clubs:

- Kauai Lagoons G.C. (Kiele Mauka Nine / Kiele Moana Nine • Waikahe Nine)
- Kiahuna G.C., Koloa
- Kukuiolono G.C., (9 hole)
- Makai G.C. at Princeville (Ocean & Lakes nines • Woods Course (9 hole)). Designed by Robert Trent Jones, Jr.
- Poipu Bay Resort G.C., Poʻipū. Designed by Robert Trent Jones, Jr. – hosted the PGA Grand Slam of Golf from 1994-2006
- Prince G.C. at Princeville, Hanalei. Designed by Robert Trent Jones, Jr.
- Puakea G.C., Lihue
- Ocean Course at Hokuala G.C. [(Lihue, Hawaii|Lihue)]

=== Municipal ===
- Wailua G.C. – hosted the USGA Amateur Links Championship in 1975, 1985, 1996

== Lanai ==
- The Challenge at Manele
- The Experience at Koele
- Cavendish G.C., Lanai City (9 hole) Par 36 course built in 1947 for sugar plantation workers. No green fee.

== Molokai ==
- Ironwood Hills G.C. (9 hole)
