= Tourism in Hawaii =

The Hawaiian Islands

Hawaii is a U.S. state that is an archipelago in the Pacific Ocean. Of the eight major islands, Hawaii, Oʻahu, Maui, and Kauaʻi have major tourism industries. Tourism is limited on Molokai and Lānaʻi, and access to Niʻihau and Kahoʻolawe is prohibited.

The state's favorable climate, tropical landscape, beaches, and culture make it among the U.S.'s most visited states. In 2017 alone, according to state government data, there were over 9.4 million visitors to the Hawaiian Islands with expenditures of over $16 billion. These values continue to increase over time as the amount of visitor expenditures moved to $17.72 billion in 2019 and $20.73 billion in 2023. This number remained stagnant in 2024 as total visitor spending equated to roughly $20.68 billion.

Due to the mild year-round weather, tourist travel is popular throughout the year. However, the summer months and major holidays are the most popular times for outsiders to visit, especially when residents of the rest of the United States are looking to escape from cold winter weather. The Japanese, with their economic and historical ties to Hawaii and the US as well as relative geographical proximity, make up the largest group of inbound international travelers to the islands, reaching 1,568,609 in 2017.

== History of travel to Hawaii ==
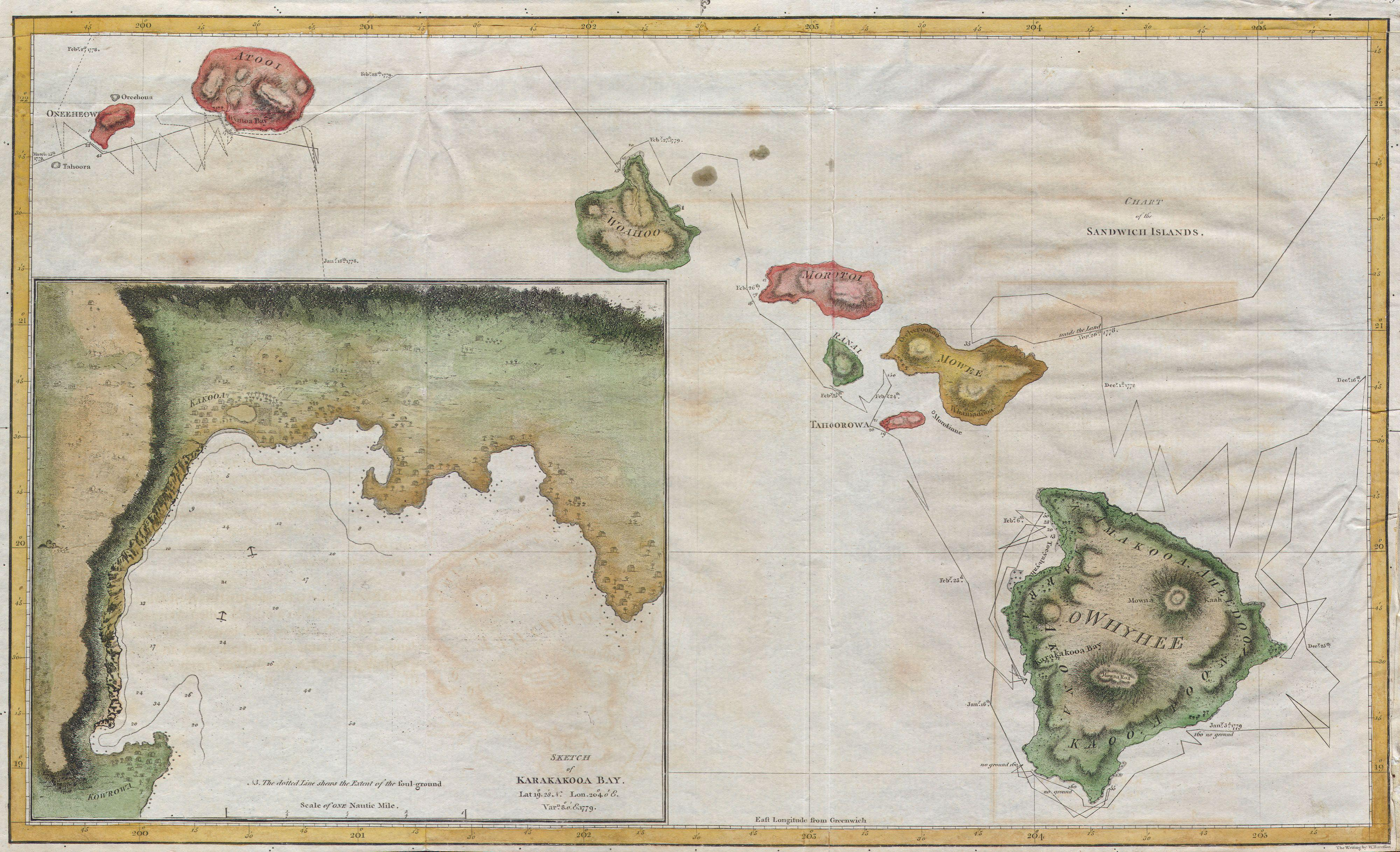
First modern map of Hawaii (1785), drawn either by William Bligh or Henry Roberts

Hawaii was first populated between 1000 and 1200 AD by people of Polynesian origin. Subsequent Western contact began as a consequence of European Enlightenment exploration and was continued by Protestant ministers of New England origin in the early 19th century.

=== 16th century ===
According to Hawaiian tradition, a vessel wrecked at Keʻei near Kealakekua Bay in the 1560s with only two survivors: the captain and his sister. Their penitent posture led to the naming of the place as Kūlou; they later intermarried with the native population and their descendants became prominent chiefs. The timing coincides with the voyage of a small fleet of three vessels commanded by Álvaro de Saavedra Cerón, who departed Mexico on October 31, 1569; during that voyage, two ships disappeared after a storm.

HMS Centurion under Anson captures the galleon Nuestra Señora de Covadonga in 1743 (painting by Samuel Scott, before 1772)

Spaniard Juan Gaetano, who had served as the pilot of a 1522 expedition led by Ruy López de Villalobos, reportedly discovered the Hawaiian Islands during that voyage. The official narrative of the voyage reported that a group of islands were found after approximately 30 days of sailing west from Mexico, which were named the Islas del Rey; these were later speculated to be the Caroline Islands or Marshall Islands, not Hawaii. The coordinates of Gaetano's discovery were not reported outside the Spanish Empire until 1743, when a manuscript chart was captured from the annual treasure galleon by HMS Centurion, commanded by Captain George Anson; although the latitude was approximately correct and the physical features were similar to the Hawaiian Islands, the longitude was 17° east of the actual position of Hawaii. The Spanish Hydrographical Department reported in 1865 that an ancient manuscript chart confirmed Gaetano's discovery from 1555, which he had named Islas de Mesa. continues as to whether the Spanish visited the islands before James Cook.

=== 18th century ===
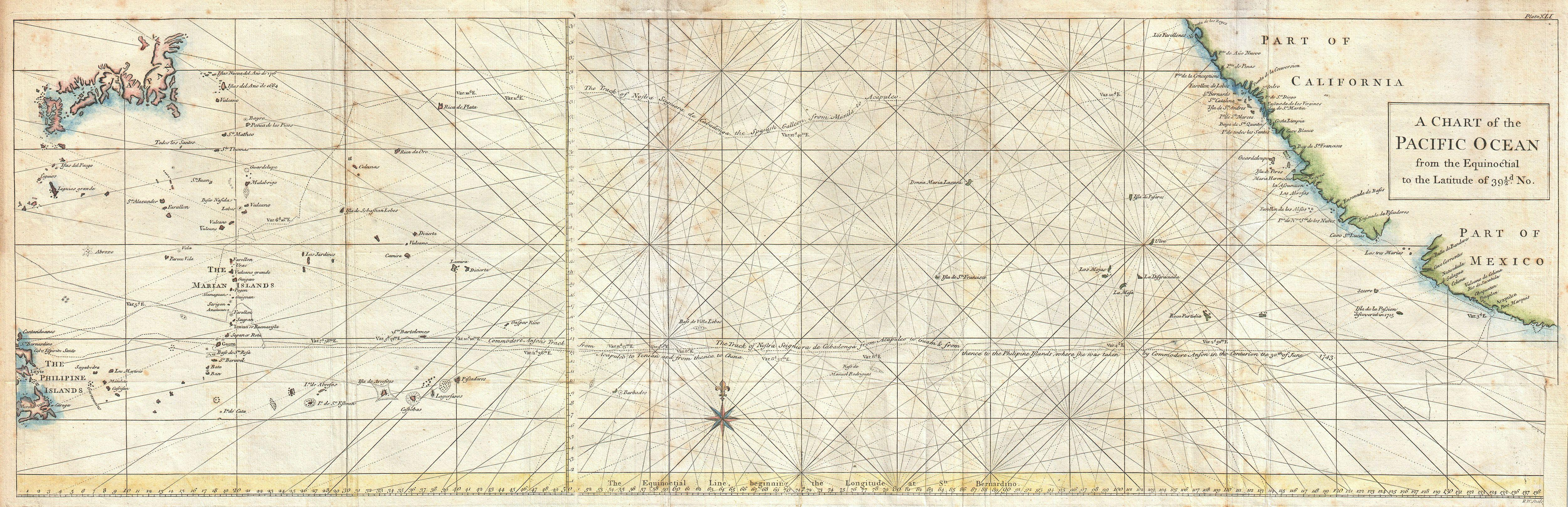
Plate XLI from A Voyage Round the World (1748); the island of La Mesa (Hawaii) is shown at 100.5°E longitude

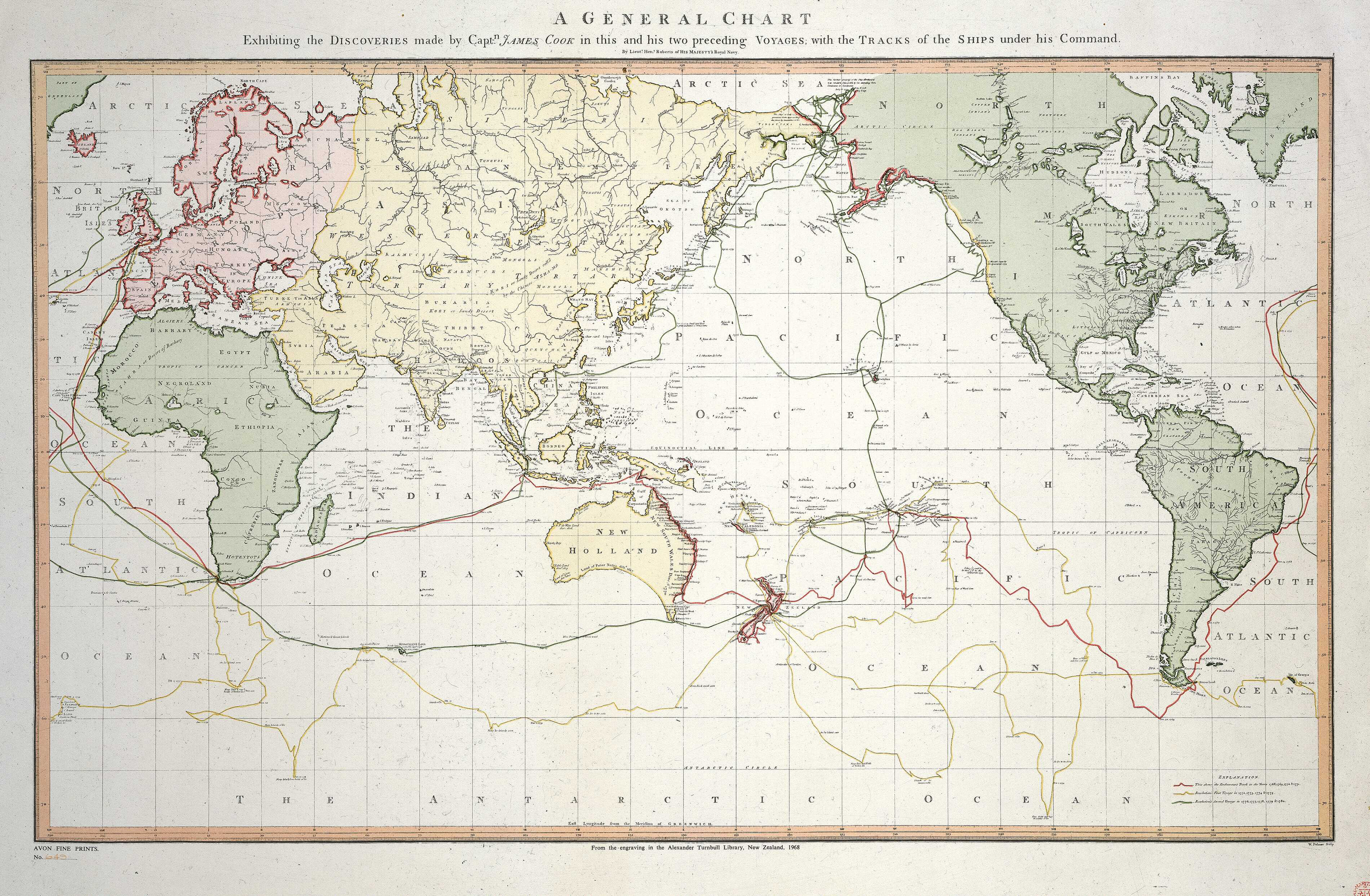
World map drawn by Lt. Henry Roberts tracing Cook's three voyages (1785)

In 1748, Anson published a redrawn version of the captured chart in A Voyage Round the World, one of the best-selling books of its day. Anson's chart showed the Pacific to be relatively barren, but the three voyages of James Cook would add significant detail.

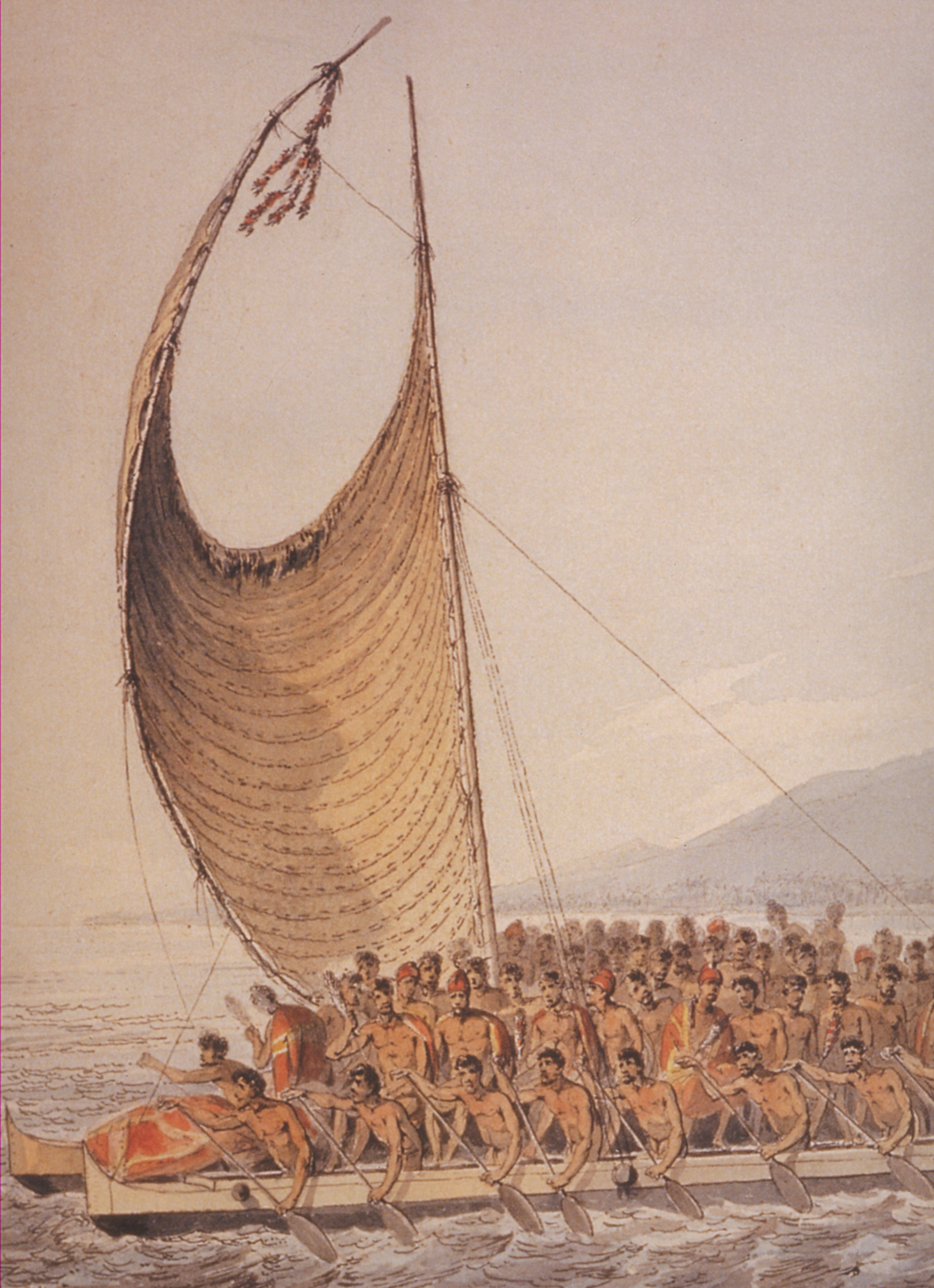
Kalaniōpu`u, King of Owyhee bringing Presents to Captain Cook, by John Webber (c. 1781–83)

The first recorded western visitor to Hawaii was Captain James Cook on his fatal third and final voyage in the Pacific. Cook's ships first sighted Niʻihau and Kauai on January 19, 1778, and anchored near Waimea the following evening. As described by James Jackson Jarves in 1843, during the first visit "the natives manifested the greatest respect and kindness toward their visitors, and both parties indulged in a lucrative trade, yet [the natives'] propensity for thieving was continually manifested ... Theft or lying were to them no crimes. Success in either was a virtue, and it was not until several severe lessons, in regard to the enormity of the former had been received, that their discretion got the better of temptation." He went on to add "the commander manifested a laudable humanity, in endeavoring to shield the population from the evil effects which so inevitably result from connection between foreign seamen and the native females. But his efforts were vain. If the discipline of his own crew could have been strictly enforced, the eagerness of the women was not to be repressed."

Cook's fleet departed on February 2, returning to Hawaii in November, when they began resupplying their ships and mapping the coastline. They anchored in Kealakekua Bay in January 1779, and stayed for 19 days; although they departed on February 6, they were forced to return for repairs on February 11. A series of misunderstandings would lead Cook to attempt to kidnap the aliʻi nui of the island of Hawaii, Kalaniʻōpuʻu, resulting in Cook's death.

=== 19th century ===
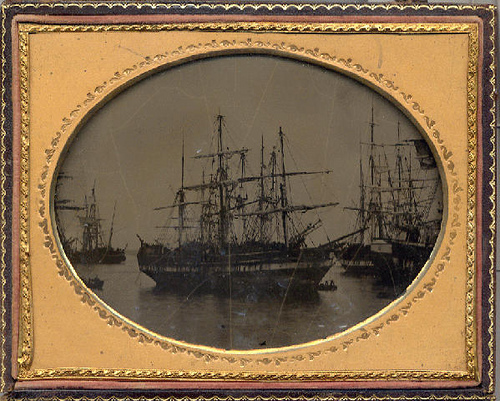
Whaler Benjamin Tucker in Honolulu (1857)

Prominent 19th-century travelers to Hawaii included journalist Isabella Bird, along with a number of American and British authors. Tourist visits remained around 2,000 per year from 1872 to 1898. American writers include Mark Twain aboard the steamship Ajax as a travel journalist with the Sacramento Daily Union in 1866, and Herman Melville, who deserted from his whaler in 1843 and later found passage back to the mainland that summer aboard USS United States. Twain's unfinished novel of Hawaii was incorporated into his A Connecticut Yankee in King Arthur's Court, with King Arthur bearing striking similarities to Kamehameha V, the first reigning monarch Twain was to meet. The "modernizing" potential offered by the Connecticut Yankee from the future is a satire of the potentially negative Protestant Missionary influence on Hawaiian life. Melville's writing of the Pacific includes Typee and Omoo (considered factual travel accounts when published) and his Pacific experiences would develop into the portrayal of Queequeg in Moby-Dick.

British writers include the Scot Robert Louis Stevenson, whose subsequent In the South Seas was published based on his voyages. During his stay in the islands, he wrote a stunning defense of Father Damien's work with the lepers of Kalaupapa against the politicized views of Father Damien's Protestant detractors. Consequently, Hawaiʻi is home to the eponymous Stevenson Middle School. Stevenson later died in Samoa.

Regular commercial passenger, cargo, and mail service to Hawaii via steamship started in 1870 with the North Pacific Transportation Company of Australia. The Oceanic Steamship Company was incorporated by John D. Spreckels, son of sugar baron Claus Spreckels, on December 24, 1881, to establish a steamship line between San Francisco and Hawaii. Oceanic signed a contract in July 1882 with William Cramp & Sons for two "first-class iron steamships" intended for the Honolulu route; these were completed in 1883 as the Alameda and Mariposa. Spreckels traveled to the East Coast intending to contract for the building of two more steamships, but returned in March 1886 after having purchased Zealandia and Australia from John Elder & Company.

William Matson had served as captain of Claus Spreckels's yacht (named Lurline) and in turn, Spreckels helped Matson purchase his first ship, the Emma Claudina (named for Spreckels's daughter), which made its first voyage to Hawaii in 1882. Matson would go on to found the Matson Navigation Company, whose genesis was in the first Lurline, purchased to replace the smaller Emma Claudina; that first Lurline was sold to Matson by Spreckels and undertook a two-month maiden sail from San Francisco to Hawaii in 1887, marking the start of Matson's commercial passenger service to the Hawaiian Islands.

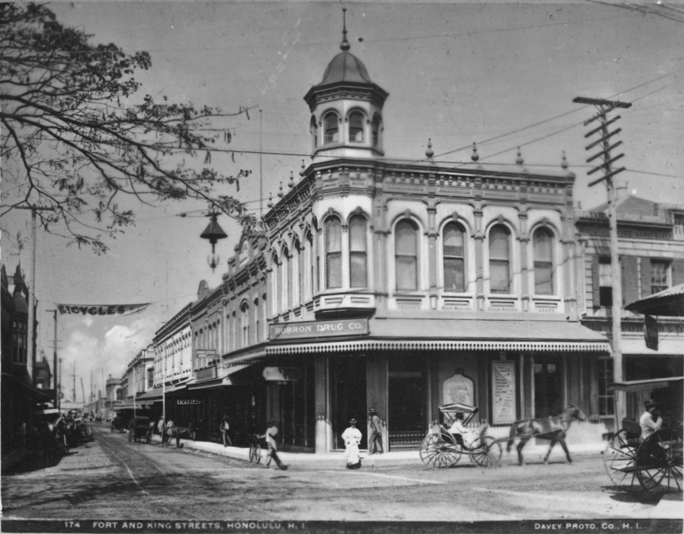
Intersection of Fort and King, Honolulu (photographed by Frank Davey, c. 1900)

19th-century development in Hawaii played a big part in the increase of tourism that continued into the 21st century. In 1888, a writer for the Los Angeles Herald extolled "culture, refinement, and a hospitality so cordial that one scarcely meets it elsewhere" joined with "the island air that is kept pure and sweet by the gentle trade winds' refreshing currents". Advanced technologies including cars, marketing, hotels, and shopping malls allow vacationers to visit a modernized tropical island, which contributes heavily to steady growth in tourism. Conversely, the Native Hawaiian population continues to decrease, resulting in a loss of authentic Hawaiian culture on the islands, similar to other Oceanian islands.

=== 20th century ===
In 1907, Jack London and his wife Charmian sailed to Hawaii, learning the "royal sport" of surfing and travelling by horseback to Haleakalā and Hana, as chronicled in his book The Cruise of the Snark. 1929 saw 22,000 tourists visit Hawaii, while the number of tourists exceeded 1 million for the first time in 1967.

==== Marine service ====
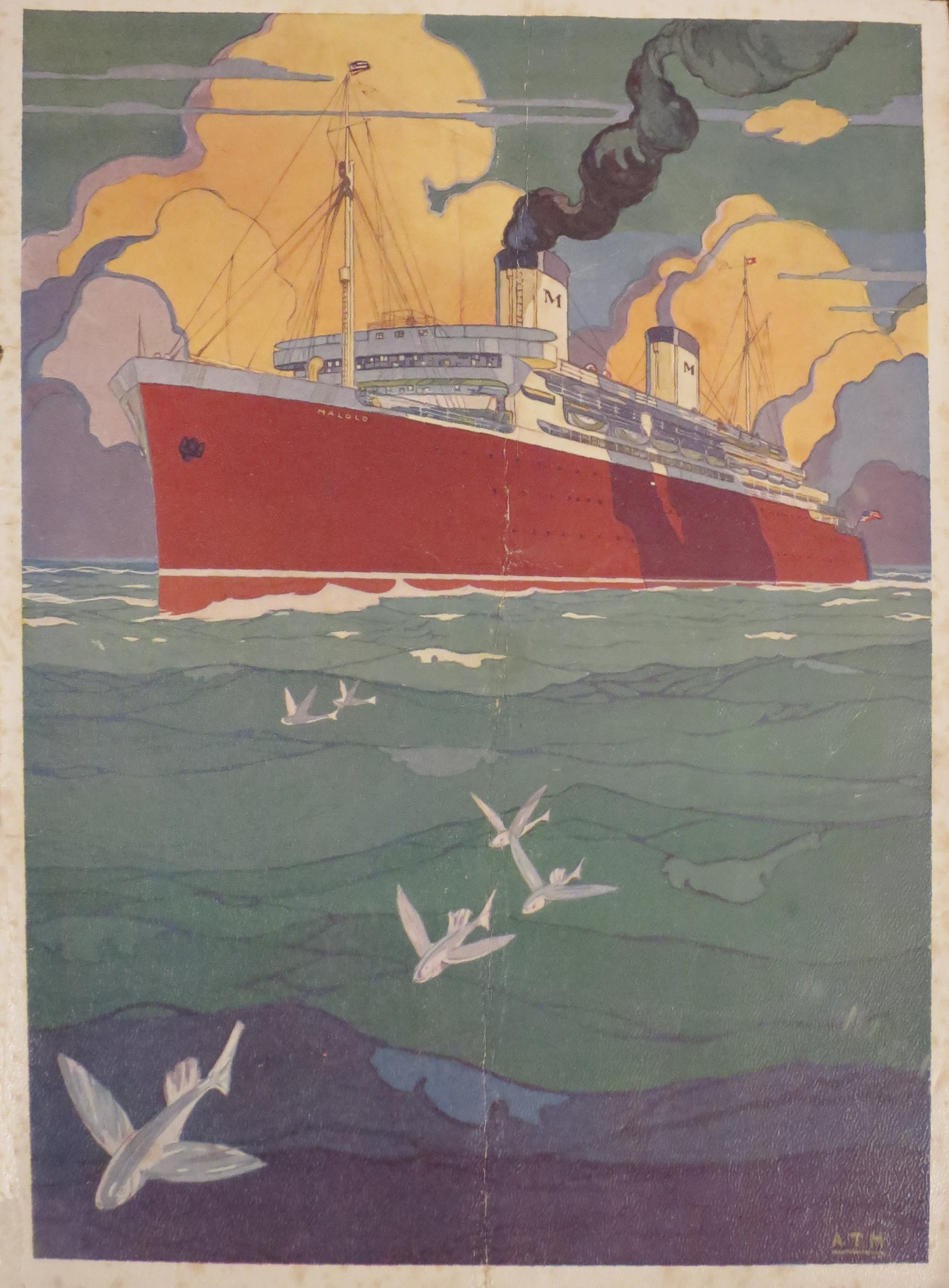
Royal Hawaiian Hotel banquet menu cover celebrating the maiden voyage of SS Malolo, painted by Arman Manookian

The second SS Lurline, completed in 1908, was the first steamship built for Matson; she was designed to accommodate passengers (51) in addition to cargo. Matson added Wilhelmina, which made her maiden voyage from San Francisco to Honolulu in February 1910. Both of these ships were named after the daughters of prominent executives: Lurline Matson, daughter of founder William Matson; and Wilhelmina Tenney, daughter of Edward Davies Tenney, the chairman of Castle & Cooke, the Honolulu agent for Matson.

By 1913, Matson was building more passenger liners for the Honolulu run, Manoa and Matsonia. Direct service from Hawaii to Los Angeles was established by Manoa in October 1914. Another Matson steamship, Maui, sister to Matsonia, was launched in 1916 at San Francisco, the largest passenger ship then constructed on the West Coast. However, Matson's Hawaiian routes were interrupted by World War I, as the government announced plans to requisition five ships in 1917; that was later reduced to three: Wilhelmina, Matsonia, and Maui, which served as troop transports before they were released in 1919. Maui made 13 roundtrips to France, carrying 37,344 troops; Matsonia, 14 roundtrips (38,974); and Wilhelmina, 13 roundtrips (23,014).

Growth in tourist travel followed World War I. Matson opened its eponymous headquarters on Market Street in 1924, and conducted marine operations via berths and warehouses at Piers 30–32 in San Francisco; Castle & Cooke also moved into new offices in Honolulu at approximately the same time, and Matson ships docked at Aloha Pier, surrounding Aloha Tower. Matson acquired the Oceanic Steamship operation in May 1926, extending its reach past Hawaii to Australia and New Zealand, and introduced the SS Malolo, the first of its four "White Fleet" ocean liners for Hawaii service, in 1927; at the time, she was the largest passenger steamship built in the United States. Malolo was one part of a three-pronged effort devised by William P. Roth, the son-in-law of Captain Matson and Matson's general manager, and E.D. Tenney, named president of Matson after Matson's death in 1917, to develop the modern Hawaiian tourist industry; a luxury hotel (completed in 1927 as the Royal Hawaiian, in partnership with the Territorial Hotel Company) and golf course (Waialae Country Club) would also help transform Hawaii into a premier resort destination. However, Malolo had an inauspicious start to her career, colliding with the steamship Jacob Christensen in heavy fog during sea trials in May 1927; despite the delay to inaugurating modern ocean liner service, annual tourist traffic to Hawaii jumped from 17,500 (1927) to 22,000 (1929) until the Great Depression started, cutting annual traffic to less than 11,000 tourists in 1932 and 1933.

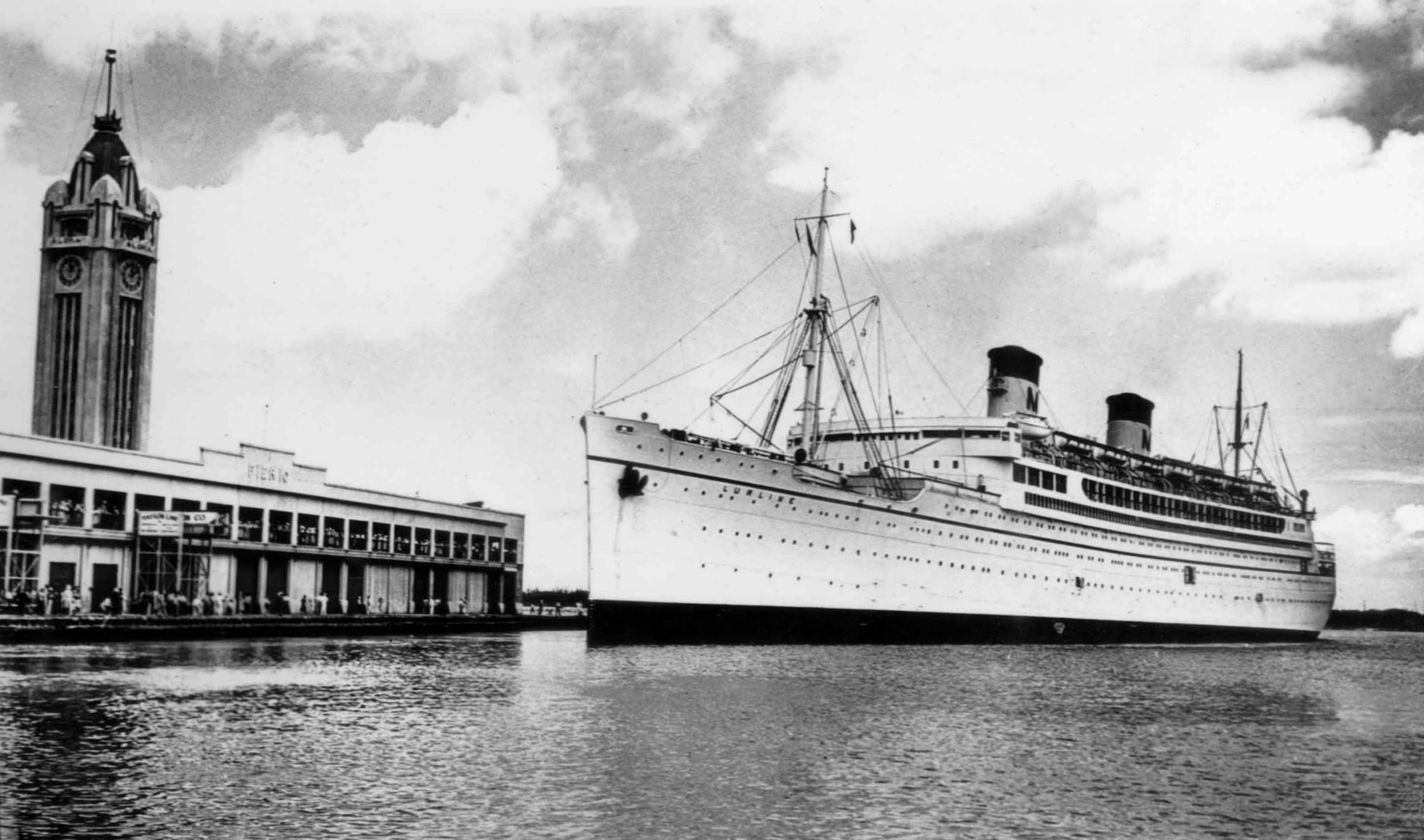
SS Lurline (1932) at Honolulu with Aloha Tower in the background (1930s)

Matson would go on to build three sister ships to Malolo, all completed in 1932: Mariposa, Monterey, and a third Lurline. After Lurline completed her complicated 30,000-mile (48,000 km) maiden voyage from New York around the Pacific Ocean in early 1933 Matson established regular Honolulu service with the four ships. Two-week voyages were operated by Malolo ("clockwise" on a Los Angeles—Hawaii—San Francisco route) and Lurline ("counter-clockwise" on a San Francisco—Hawaii—Los Angeles route); the subsidiary Matson-Oceanic lines operated Mariposa and Monterey on longer four-week cruises from San Francisco and Los Angeles to Australia and New Zealand via Hawaii. Matson purchased the assets of the Territorial Hotel Company in 1932, giving cruise passengers disembarking in Honolulu a choice from three hotels: the Moana, the Alexander Young, or the Royal Hawaiian. In 1934, a planned 88-day Pacific cruise aboard Malolo was canceled after heavy demand for passenger service to Hawaii tied up all of Matson's available ships; by 1941, tourist traffic had rebounded past pre-Depression levels, with 31,000 tourists visiting Hawaii that year.

Lurline was steaming from Honolulu to San Francisco during the attack on Pearl Harbor; she proceeded at full speed and returned to San Francisco on December 10. The United States's entry into World War II once again prompted the government to requisition Matson liners as troopships; all four "White Fleet" ships (Lurline, Mariposa, Matsonia [ex-Malolo], and Monterey) served along with the older Maui. Maui accommodated 1,650 passengers after refit; Lurline, 4,037; Matsonia (ex-Malolo), 2,976; Mariposa, 4,272; and Monterey was used to carry war brides and dependents. In addition, Matson converted a number of cargo vessels to troopships and operated others.

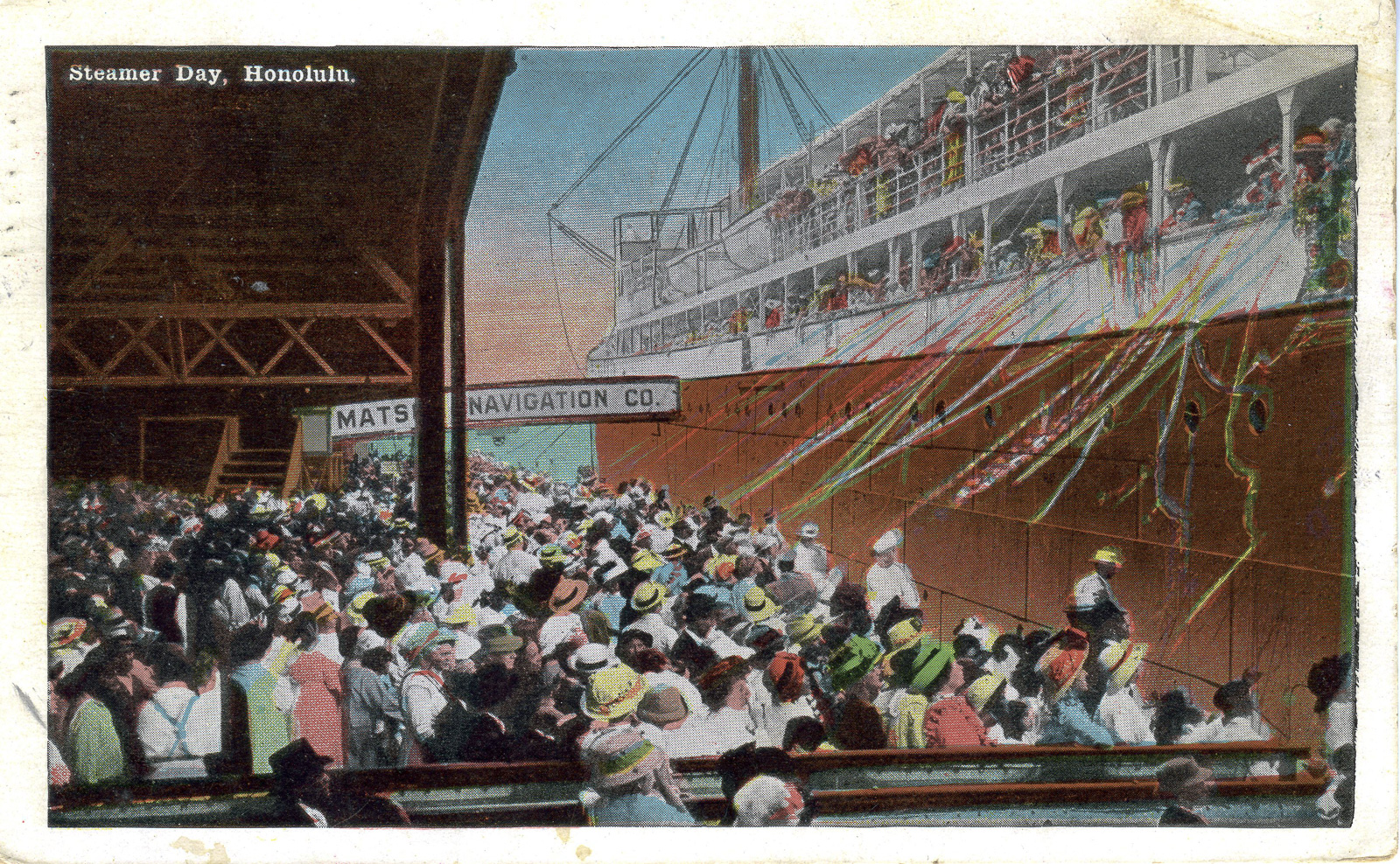
Steamer Day at Honolulu, marking the departure of a Matson liner (1930s)

After the war, Matsonia (ex-Malolo) was the first to return to commercial service in May 1946, but she was laid up and sold in 1948 following the completion of the US$18,000,000 (equivalent to $241,200,000 in 2025) rebuild of Lurline. When Lurline arrived in Honolulu on April 21, 1948, after her maiden voyage following the rebuild, she was adorned with the longest lei ever made, 80 feet (24 m) long using 1 mile (1.6 km) of orange crêpe paper.

A rebuild of Mariposa and Monterey was also announced; the rebuild would have given each ship the capacity for 726 passengers (488 first class and 238 cabin class), served by 437 crew. However, the cost of the rebuild was higher than expected, and work was halted; both ships remained in the reserve fleets at Alameda and Suisun. Mariposa was sold in 1953 and Monterey was not repurchased by Matson until 1956; later that year a new Mariposa (ex-Pine Tree Mariner) and Monterey (ex-Free State Mariner), both converted from cargo ships launched in 1952, entered service for Matson on their traditional California–Hawaii–Australia/New Zealand route. After Monterey (1932) was rebuilt at Newport News, she was renamed Matsonia and alternated with Lurline on the Hawaii run starting from June 1957 until Lurline was sold in 1963. Matsonia (ex-Monterey) was renamed Lurline in December 1963 to carry on the name. The advent of jetliner travel, cutting the five-day voyage from California to Hawaii down to a matter of hours and reducing the cost of travel, decimated cruise passenger traffic; Matson exited the passenger business altogether in 1970 and sold its last White Fleet liner, Lurline (ex-Matsonia, ex-Monterey).

==== Air service ====
Posters advertising flight services to Hawaii

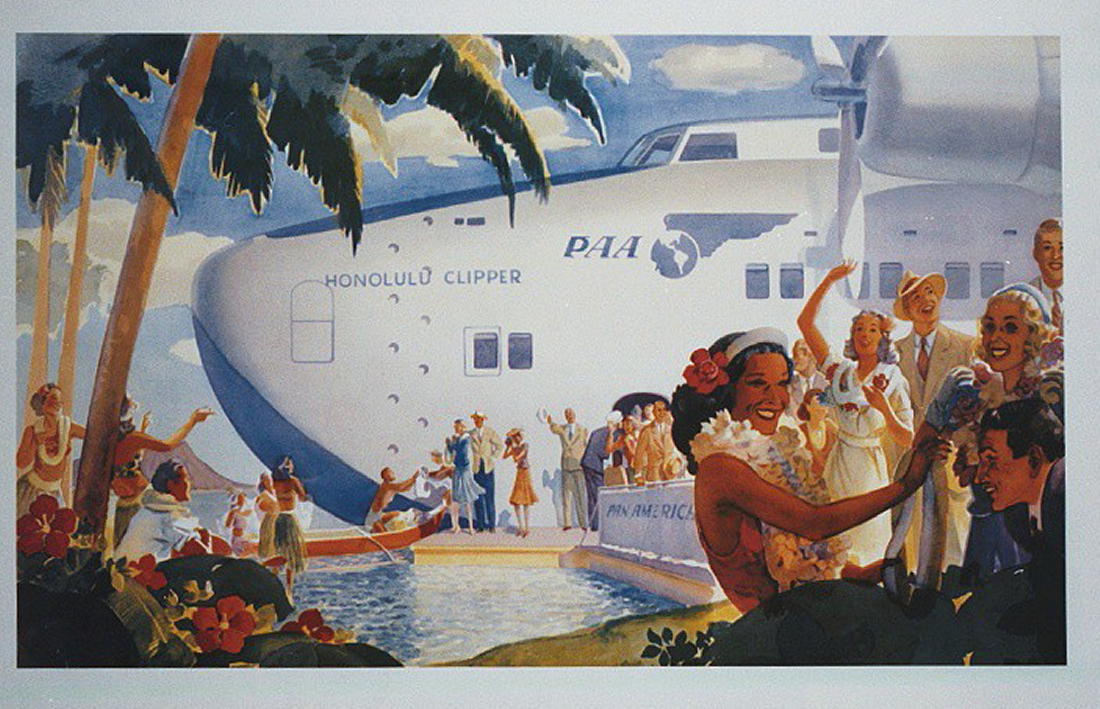
Pan American Airways (1930s) via Honolulu Clipper

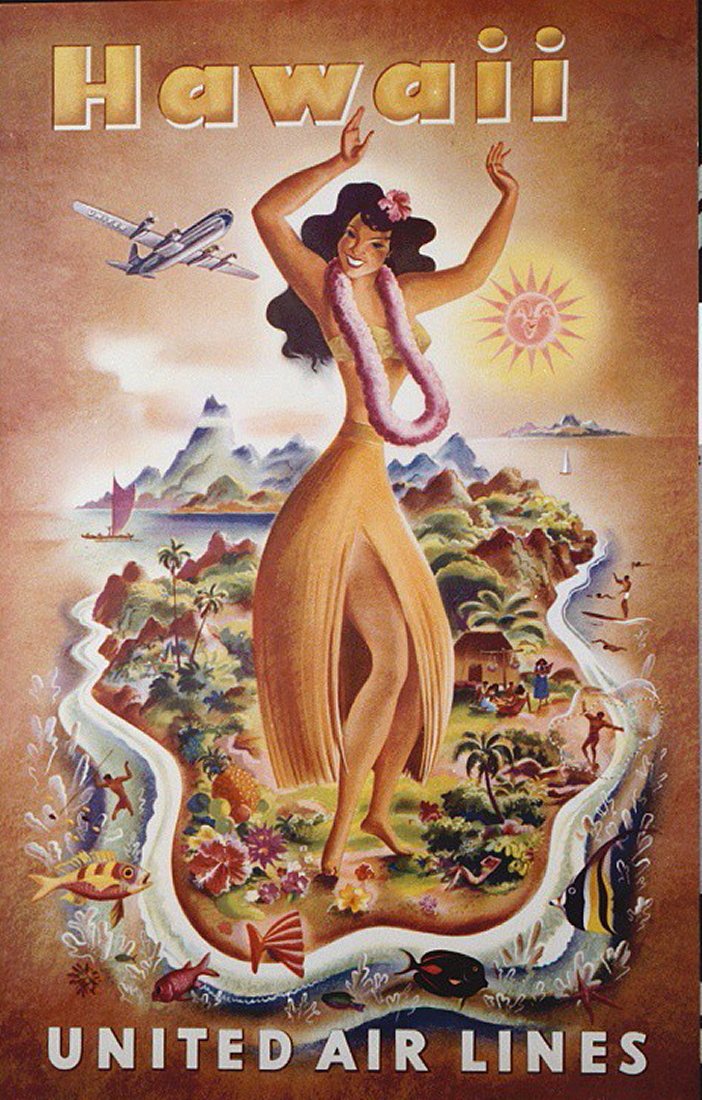
United Air Lines (c. 1951) via Stratocruiser

The United States Navy used two PN-9 seaplanes to attempt the first nonstop flight to Hawaii from mainland America in 1925; the aircraft, designated PN-9 Nos. 1 and 3, departed San Francisco on August 31 for Kahului, Maui. A third seaplane, the Boeing PB-1, was intended to join the other two, but it was scrubbed at the last minute. No. 3 was forced down by engine trouble approximately 300 nautical miles (560 km; 350 mi) from San Francisco; it capsized while being towed back to Mare Island Navy Yard for repairs. A tailwind that was predicted to aid the airplanes 600 miles (970 km) into the 2,100-mile (3,400 km) flight never materialized, and strong headwinds increased fuel consumption. No. 1 ran out of fuel approximately 275 miles (443 km) short of Hawaii as it was entering a squall. Commander John Rodgers had intended to land No. 1 at the USS Aroostook (a seaplane tender), one of the picket ships stationed along the flight path, to refuel and then continue the flight to Hawaii. However, the crew was unable to find Aroostook and landed after exhausting their fuel; they fashioned a fabric sail from the plane's lower wing and sailed towards Hawaii, averaging 50 miles (80 km) each day over the next nine days. The search for PN-9 No. 1 was called off by September 8, and the Navy began to prepare the PB-1 to re-attempt the nonstop flight to Hawaii. During its sail, the seaplane passed as close as 40 miles (64 km) from Oahu, then steered for Kauai, where they were finally spotted by the patrolling submarine USS R-9 10 miles (16 km) off Nāwiliwili Bay. The submarine towed the PN-9 to the harbor, where they were greeted by the native population, 218 hours after being forced down.

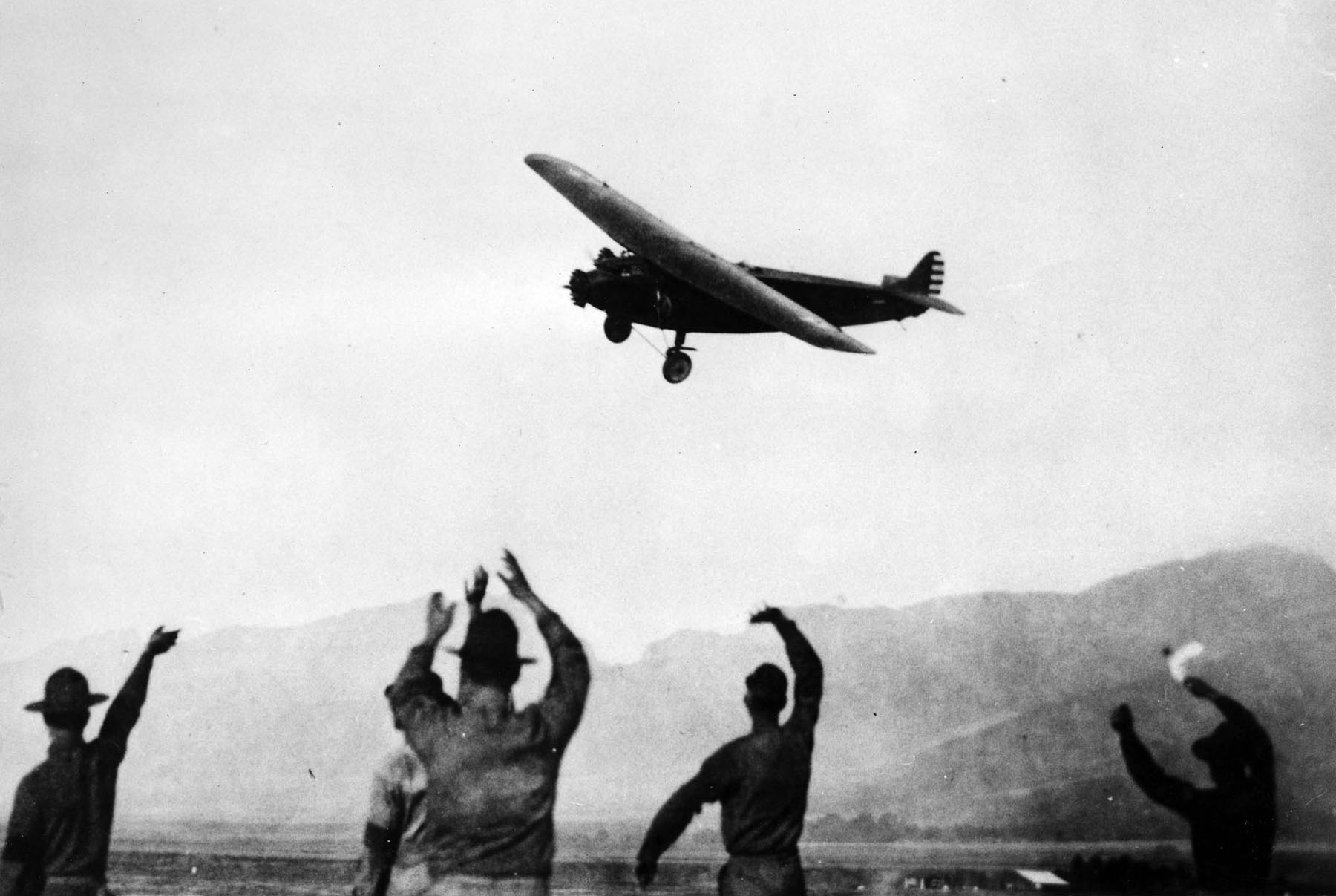
Maitland and Hegenberger arrive at Wheeler Field aboard Fokker C-2 Bird of Paradise

Succeeding where the Navy had failed, on June 29, 1927, Lieutenants Lester Maitland and Albert Hegenberger of the United States Army Air Corps landed at Wheeler Field following the first successful non-stop flight to Hawaii, piloting the Fokker C-2 Bird of Paradise from Oakland to Honolulu. Rumors of a Hawaiian flight attempt had followed the crew across the country as he piloted the Fokker to the West Coast in mid-June; they denied the rumors, claiming it was a transcontinental test of the trimotor Fokker, as it was laden with the equivalent weight of 30 men. Bird of Paradise was flown to San Francisco on June 25 from San Diego to make final preparations for the Hawaii attempt, and the plane departed shortly after 7 AM on June 28 from Oakland Municipal Airport; a parallel competing attempt by a civilian pilot was scrubbed after the windshield was cracked. Maitland and Hegenberger returned to San Francisco aboard the Matson steamer Maui; Bird of Paradise remained in Hawaii to provide inter-island service.

Inspired by Charles Lindbergh's successful transatlantic flight in April 1927, pineapple magnate James Dole announced the Dole Air Race in May 1927, which would award US$25,000 (equivalent to $463,000 in 2025) to the crew of the first airplane to complete a non-stop flight from Oakland, California to Honolulu, Hawaii, within a 12-month period starting in August 1927. Eight aircraft eventually flew in the Dole Air Race; however, only two aircraft completed the flight and ten people were killed in the attempt.

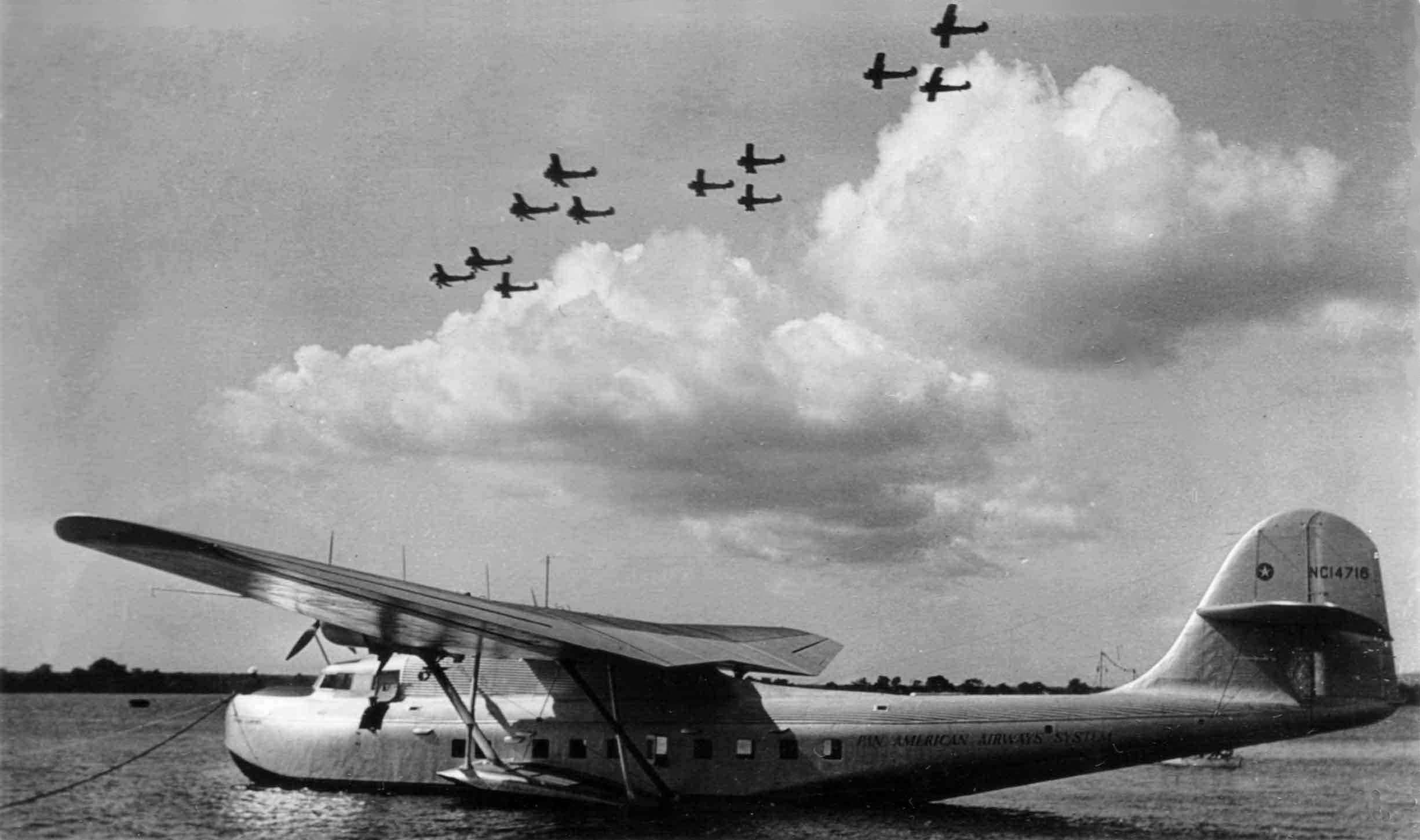
Martin M-130 China Clipper in Pearl Harbor

The first commercial passenger aircraft service to the Hawaiian Islands from San Francisco commenced on October 21, 1936, with a once-weekly flight operated by Pan American Airways aboard the Martin M-130 Clipper; this first revenue service flight was taken by Hawaii Clipper. Pan Am introduced the larger Boeing 314 to the route in 1939; onboard accommodations included a lounge and sleeping berths.

In 1944, the Civil Aeronautics Board held hearings to break up the Pan Am monopoly on overseas flights from America and after World War II, other airlines were granted routes to Hawaii; United Airlines and Northwest Airlines soon began service to Honolulu from major West Coast cities: San Francisco (United, 1947), Los Angeles (United, 1950), Seattle (Northwest, 1949), and Portland (Northwest, 1949).

=== 21st century ===
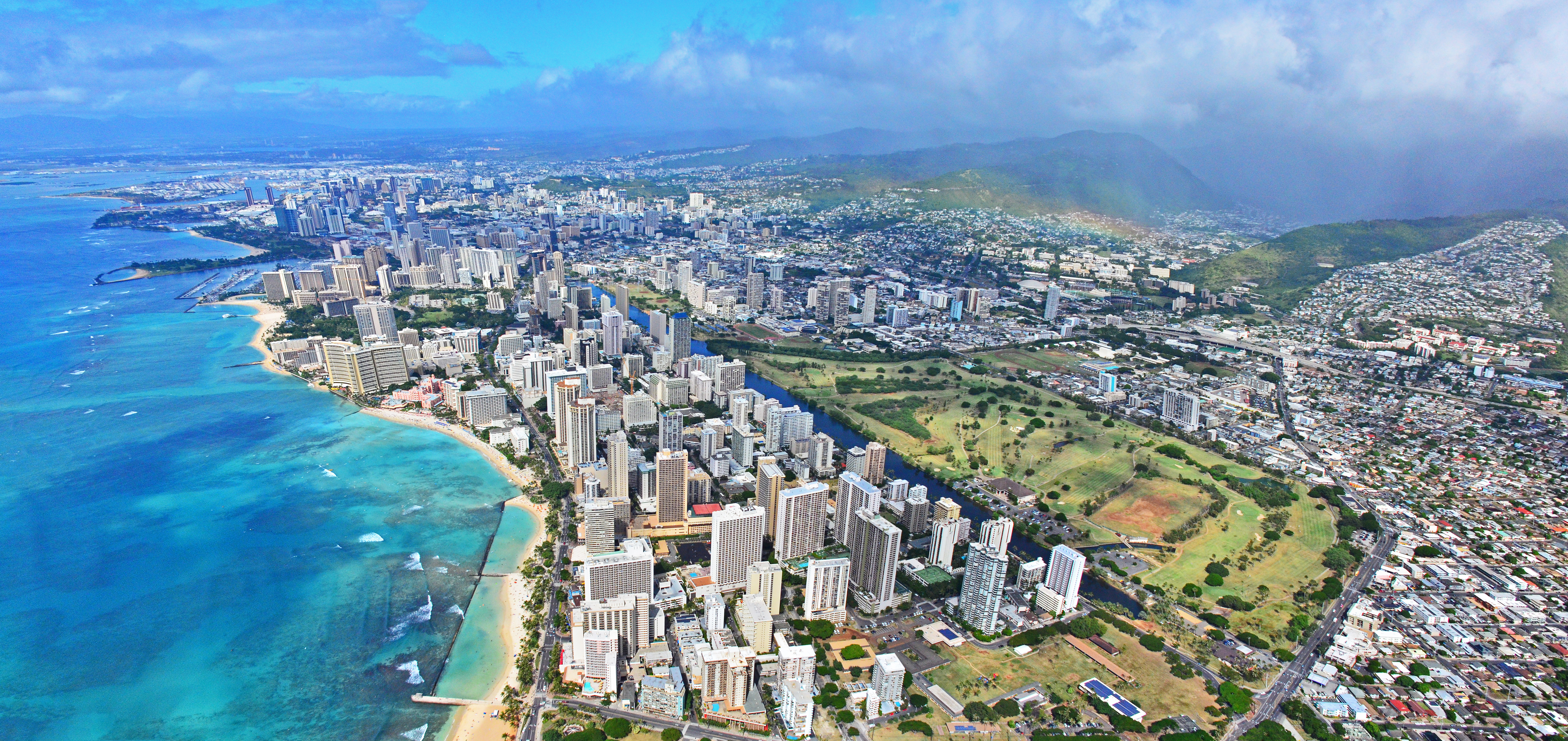
Panorama of Waikiki (2014)

Widespread fear of flying after the September 11 attacks greatly reduced tourism in Hawaii. The Washington Post wrote in March 2002 that "at the Polynesian Cultural Center ... the barefoot guides seemed to outnumber visitors". Although 2006 and 2007 saw a big increase in tourism, it soon took a turn for the worse when Hawaii's economy plummeted, but later recovered. Tourism officials said several factors have kept sightseers away: Two major airlines and two cruise ships stopped operating in the Aloha State, reducing options for visitors, high fuel prices last summer deterred travel, then recessions in Japan and the U.S., as well as California's economic meltdown, slowed the flow of tourists.

In 2007, Japanese tourists on average used to spend more money than American tourists; because of this, tourism-related businesses in Hawaii used to value Japanese customers. However this has all changed with the collapse of the value of the yen and the Japanese economy. The average Japanese tourist now stays only 5 days, while the average East Asian tourist from China or Korea stays more than 9.5 days and spends 25% more.

Hawaii has been seeing increased numbers of visitors from South Korea and China.

In 2011, Hawaii saw increasing arrivals and share of foreign tourists from Canada, Australia and China increasing 13%, 24% and 21% respectively from 2010. In 2014 a record 8.3 million visitors arrived to Hawaii (39.4% from the U.S. West, 20.8% from the U.S. East, 18.3% from Japan, 6.3% from Canada, 15.2% others), spending $14.7 billion. The amount increased to 9.4 million visitors spending over $16 billion in 2017.

== Impacts of tourism in Hawaii ==
Annual visitor counts & spending by year
Year & mode		Visitors by island						Hawaiʻi (statewide)		Ref.
Year & mode		Oʻahu	Maui	Molokaʻi	Lānaʻi	Kauaʻi	Hawaiʻi	Total Visitors	Spending ($ mil.)	Ref.
1998	U.S. (Note: Flights originating from domestic (United States) airports.)	2,222,551	1,725,134	62,563	82,385	881,571	927,037	4,014,140	10,309.2	
1998	Int'l (Note: Flights originating from international airports.)	2,379,283	518,779	12,682	15,048	196,828	413,731	2,581,650	10,309.2	
1998	Cruise	40,074	33,093	0	0	39,606	40,308	40,942	10,309.2	
1999	U.S.	2,347,040	1,813,488	59,685	80,434	929,657	942,359	4,255,621	10,279.7	
1999	Int'l	2,213,101	465,446	9,972	14,112	159,632	365,361	2,485,416	10,279.7	
1999	Cruise	44,716	41,840	0	0	39,095	42,219	44,755	10,279.7	
2000	U.S.	2,485,058	1,783,820	55,571	76,390	884,408	925,357	4,446,936	10,918.1	
2000	Int'l	2,234,186	462,433	8,987	11,271	190,414	342,609	2,501,659	10,918.1	
2000	Cruise	39,509	37,029	0	0	30,484	35,047	40,699	10,918.1	
2001	U.S.	2,379,285	1,640,961	52,312	72,783	839,368	868,615	4,224,321	10,121.2 (Note: Revised to 9,194.6 million in the 2002 report.)	
2001	Int'l	1,878,250	407,806	17,921	12,122	169,329	312,936	2,079,470	10,121.2	
2001	Cruise	45,976	41,288	0	0	36,309	40,567	46,571	10,121.2	
2002	U.S.	2,423,169	1,725,051	53,152	64,433	849,913	918,680	4,358,850	9,993.8 (Note: Revised to 9,608.9 million in the 2003 report.)	
2002	Int'l	1,852,908	348,000	21,983	16,441	155,985	324,633	2,030,208	9,993.8	
2002	Cruise	63,776	58,853	0	0	53,898	55,630	63,776	9,993.8	
2003	U.S.	2,415,386	1,852,144	70,624	72,674	861,580	922,217	4,531,289	10,054.5	
2003	Int'l	1,675,097	273,277	23,483	18,772	114,287	284,946	1,849,150	10,054.5	
2003	Cruise	61,581	43,514	5,090	6,009	38,660	40,548	61,581	10,054.5	
2004	U.S.	2,612,029	1,895,582	57,987	63,172	906,105	982,704	4,892,960	10,861.8	
2004	Int'l	1,852,523	259,979	14,112	10,216	114,816	298,452	2,019,134	10,861.8	
2004	Cruise	79,376	69,427	7,573	8,971	66,014	73,901	79,833	10,861.8	
2005	U.S.	2,808,467	2,040,855	58,515	65,013	988,304	1,173,629	5,313,281	11,904.0	
2005	Int'l	1,923,376	253,843	14,991	8,279	101,843	347,907	2,103,293	11,904.0	
2005	Cruise	77,662	43,514	5,090	6,009	38,660	40,548	77,662	11,904.0	
2006	U.S.	2,840,061	2,138,430	60,095	71,444	1,090,346	1,272,618	5,495,813	12,381.0 (Note: Revised to 12,491.6 million in the 2007 report.)	
2006	Int'l	1,787,423	287,965	24,908	21,728	112,918	324,439	1,965,486	12,381.0	
2006	Cruise	Island-specific visitor data not recorded.						100,012	12,381.0	
2007	U.S.	2,950,383	2,172,682	65,197	81,160	1,183,490	1,305,218	5,582,530	12,811.1	
2007	Int'l	1,744,367	290,913	17,966	19,190	115,555	317,141	1,914,290	12,811.1	
2007	Cruise	Island-specific visitor data not recorded.						130,999	12,811.1	
2008	U.S.	2,554,895	1,804,988	51,017	66,066	940,777	1,026,048	4,901,893	11,398.5	
2008	Int'l	1,638,790	270,812	17,866	14,801	89,870	295,229	1,811,543	11,398.5	
2008	Cruise	Island-specific visitor data not recorded.						109,475	11,398.5	
2009	U.S.	2,446,800	1,651,970	41,077	52,541	940,777	1,026,048	4,672,001	9,993.2	
2009	Int'l	1,578,089	240,427	7,262	8,513	71,513	264,413	1,748,447	9,993.2	
2009	Cruise	Island-specific visitor data not recorded.						96,606	9,993.2	
2010	U.S.	2,587,557	1,802,254	41,599	57,710	880,358	986,086	5,022,883 (Note: Revised to 4,957,352 in the 2011 report. By island: Oahu 2,532,365; Maui 1,790,588; Molokai 41,055; Lanai 57,031; Kauai 870,746; Hawaii 976,459.)	11,166.3 (Note: Revised to 11,066.4 million in the 2011 report.)	
2010	Int'l	1,741,292	289,815	8,653	11,174	84,366	304,773	1,959,542	11,166.3	
2010	Cruise	Island-specific visitor data not recorded.						101,239	11,166.3	
2011	U.S.	2,592,014	1,831,088	43,865	61,848	914,423	1,022,016	5,127,291	12,254.6 (Note: Revised to 12,048.3 million in the 2012 report.)	
2011	Int'l	1,809,609	337,399	11,385	13,156	97,077	296,294	2,047,106	12,254.6	
2011	Cruise	Island-specific visitor data not recorded.						124,650	12,254.6	
2012	U.S.	2,734,643	1,914,706	41,740	58,877	977,820	1,072,678	5,403,025	14,250.2	
2012	Int'l	2,169,402	394,488	11,583	13,772	106,861	360,604	2,464,118	14,250.2	
2012	Cruise	Island-specific visitor data not recorded.						161,600	14,250.2	
2013	U.S.	2,732,456	1,921,362	42,663	58,334	987,818	1,055,383	5,405,300	14,421.3 (Note: Revised to 14,412.6 million in the 2014 report.)	
2013	Int'l	2,311,820	437,421	12,494	15,975	126,537	379,862	2,598,174	14,421.3	
2013	Cruise	Island-specific visitor data not recorded.						170,987	14,421.3	
2014	U.S.	2,763,832	1,970,676	47,296	54,612	986,198	1,078,953	5,473,388 (Note: Revised to 5,486,059 in the 2015 report. By island: Oahu 2,779,642; Maui 1,977,718; Molokai 47,737; Lanai 54,852; Kauai 988,312; Hawaii 1,084,443.)	14,821.0 (Note: Revised to 14,851.1 million in the 2015 report.)	
2014	Int'l	2,413,026	439,538	12,351	13,336	131,506	370,117	2,710,283	14,821.0	
2014	Cruise	Island-specific visitor data not recorded.						124,443	14,821.0	
2015	U.S.	2,868,749	2,083,999	49,843	44,334	1,028,294	1,154,201	5,782,140	14,976.9	
2015	Int'l	2,471,163	456,163	14,924	14,057	145,458	360,772	2,780,878	14,976.9	
2015	Cruise	Island-specific visitor data not recorded.						116,546	14,976.9	
2016	U.S.	2,913,562	2,171,914	44,203	49,299	1,050,577	1,187,740	5,968,779	15,793.1	
2016	Int'l	2,533,667	462,323	14,728	13,725	136,691	362,203	2,853,023	15,793.1	
2016	Cruise	Island-specific visitor data not recorded.						112,475	15,793.1	
2017	U.S.	3,009,467	2,269,119	41,560	48,021	1,125,560	1,292,724	6,239,748	16,684.2 (Note: Revised to 16,668.7 million in the 2018 report.)	
2017	Int'l	2,681,286	475,875	16,890	16,337	154,408	468,765	3,037,865	16,684.2	
2017	Cruise	Island-specific visitor data not recorded.						126,733	16,684.2	
2018	U.S.	3,217,740	2,432,854	42,441	54,310	1,209,338	1,291,109	6,736,736	17,509.7	
2018	Int'l	2,664,617	482,058	16,445	20,700	179,962	415,108	3,024,712	17,509.7	
2018	Cruise	Island-specific visitor data not recorded.						127,397	17,509.7	

=== Economic ===
As Hawaii changed from a Kingdom to a Territory to a State, so too did the dominant industries change. Being a primarily agricultural land, producing around 80 percent of the world's pineapples in the 1960s, the addition of Pan Am's flight route to Hawaii rapidly increased the number of visitors going to the islands. The years following statehood led to more than double the number of passengers arriving at Honolulu airport. As this trend continues to increase, Hawaii's economy has become heavily dependent on the tourism industry. Although the economy has seen significant growth with the addition of this industry, some researchers believe this will leave Hawaii susceptible to external economic forces. Some examples of these are an economic recession, airline strikes, or varying fuel prices which could devastate the local economy. The devastating national economic recession of 2008, hit Hawaii's tourism industry hard. In 2008, hotel occupancy dropped to 60 percent, a level not seen since the terrorist attacks in 2001.

As the economy has returned to normal levels, the tourism industry has continued to grow in Hawaii with the majority of tourists visiting Oahu, Maui, Kauai and the big island of Hawaii. Job creation is another benefit of tourism to the islands. In 2017, reports say 204,000 jobs were related to tourism. This led to $16.78 billion in visitor spending with $1.96 billion generated in tax revenue in that year alone. Resorts and the airline business are the primary benefactors of this increase in tourism.

=== Environmental ===
The Sustainable Tourism Association of Hawaii (formerly the Hawaii Ecotourism Association) was founded in 1995 as a 501(c)(3) nonprofit to nurture the development of sustainable tourism in Hawaii. Ecotourism promotes ecological sustainability by acknowledging the nature and culture of the local communities. The Sustainable Tourism Association of Hawaii offers a certification program to educate and recognize conservation-minded tour operators in Hawaii, the only such certification program of its kind in America. Based on a study on sustainable tourism, those traveling to Hawaii are interested in the conservation of the natural environment, marine life, and the minimization of plastic. A master's student at the University of Hawaiʻi Manoa suggested the concept of regenerative tourism education to foster the relationships between residents, visitors, and the ʻāina, a Hawaiian word meaning "that which feeds" referring to the land and oftentimes the sea.

The long term environmental implications that Hawaii is facing due to mass tourism has raised concern. To combat this and help raise awareness, international environmental organizations have joined forces with local island communities. There are major benefits to this type of management, usually described as "values-led management". By prioritizing the values and existing sustainable practices by local communities living on heavily visited islands, it preserves their interests and further respects their culture.

==== Water ====
Studies show that the tourism sector accounts for 44.7% of Hawaii's water consumption. Global water usage resulting from tourism only directly takes up about 1% of global water consumption and studies show an insignificant anticipated increase.

Hotels are often placed near beaches, in areas with little rainfall, and guests use 2,000 to 10,000 litres (440 to 2,200 imp gal; 530 to 2,640 US gal) of water per person. Another study concluded that on average, a single guest uses approximately 1,300 to 3,600 litres (290 to 790 imp gal; 340 to 950 US gal) of water per day, divided approximately half between accommodations (laundry and sewer) and golf courses (irrigation). This is significantly more than the average resident and has led to a number of droughts throughout the islands.

==== Landscape ====
The number of hotel rooms from 1985 to 2010 nearly doubled from 65,000 to 132,000 rooms. Tourists visit destinations with developed infrastructure, groomed activities and pristine conditions, which boosts the economy and finances needed to uphold these facilities. The very creation of these institutions degrades the environmental factors tourists are drawn to. Having perfect conditions requires an amount of upkeep fueled by the revenue of the visitors. The visitors also degrade the environment at a faster rate than residents alone.

A direct effect of the increase in infrastructure is the depletion of the natural landscape. As buildings are constructed the amount of natural land becomes smaller and smaller. As hotels are constructed in prime real estate the environmental problems created are not weighed equally with the potential upside of profit. Those are quantitative variables that can be directly measured in terms of dollars and number of jobs. The impact to the environment or the indigenous people is harder to measure. Hawaii only holds 0.2 percent of the United States land but has a 72.1 percent extinction rate, and more than half of the natural communities in the islands are endangered by developments. An example of this is natural ponds being destroyed during construction of large buildings which were previously home to migrating birds. The ponds are no longer there, which throws off the natural flow of the ecosystem. Nearly 60 percent of the plant and animal species in Hawaii are endangered. This includes the loss of habitats for animals and the diverse flora that gives Hawaii its beauty.

Additionally, much of the tourism in Hawaiʻi surrounds its natural landscape. Tourists often participate in outdoor activities such as hiking, snorkeling, and lounging on beaches. These 'tourist' activities can easily cause a significant amount of damage to the natural landscape of the island. Hiking, specifically in very tourist-attracting locations, causes damage to the local flora and fauna of the landscape, in addition to posing significant safety concerns. A common issue with the overuse of hiking trails as a result of tourism is trail erosion, which can lead to damaged soil health, plant damage, and safety concerns for hikers. The rise of tourism in Hawaii over the past 75 years also led to a decrease in agricultural land use on the islands.

Two other very common tourist activities in Hawaii are exploring beaches and snorkeling. Commercial marine tourism companies, such as dolphin watching and snorkeling trips, oftentimes do not properly educate and enforce environmental protection procedures to their guests, leading to environmental damage. Examples of environmental damage are marine animal harassment, pollution (on beaches and in waters), and coral damage. Coral damage is one of the most commonly observed environmental impacts of marine recreational activities which is caused by visitors sitting, standing, and kicking reefs, whether this be intentional or accidental.

==== Energy ====
Hawaii has traditionally relied on fossil fuel-fired thermal power plants for its electricity generation, although it has set a statewide goal of achieving 100% of electric generation via renewable sources by 2045; as a result, the average guest uses the equivalent of 6.4 to 13 kilograms (14 to 29 lb) of oil per day, approximately 2/3 of which is consumed by rental car operation. For electricity alone, the average guest uses 23.9 to 33.6 kW-hr per day.

Tourism accounts for about 60% of total energy and fuel usage in Hawaii. As global tourism has been rising since the COVID-19 pandemic, it is projected that the state's energy demand continues to rise as well.

==== Refuse ====
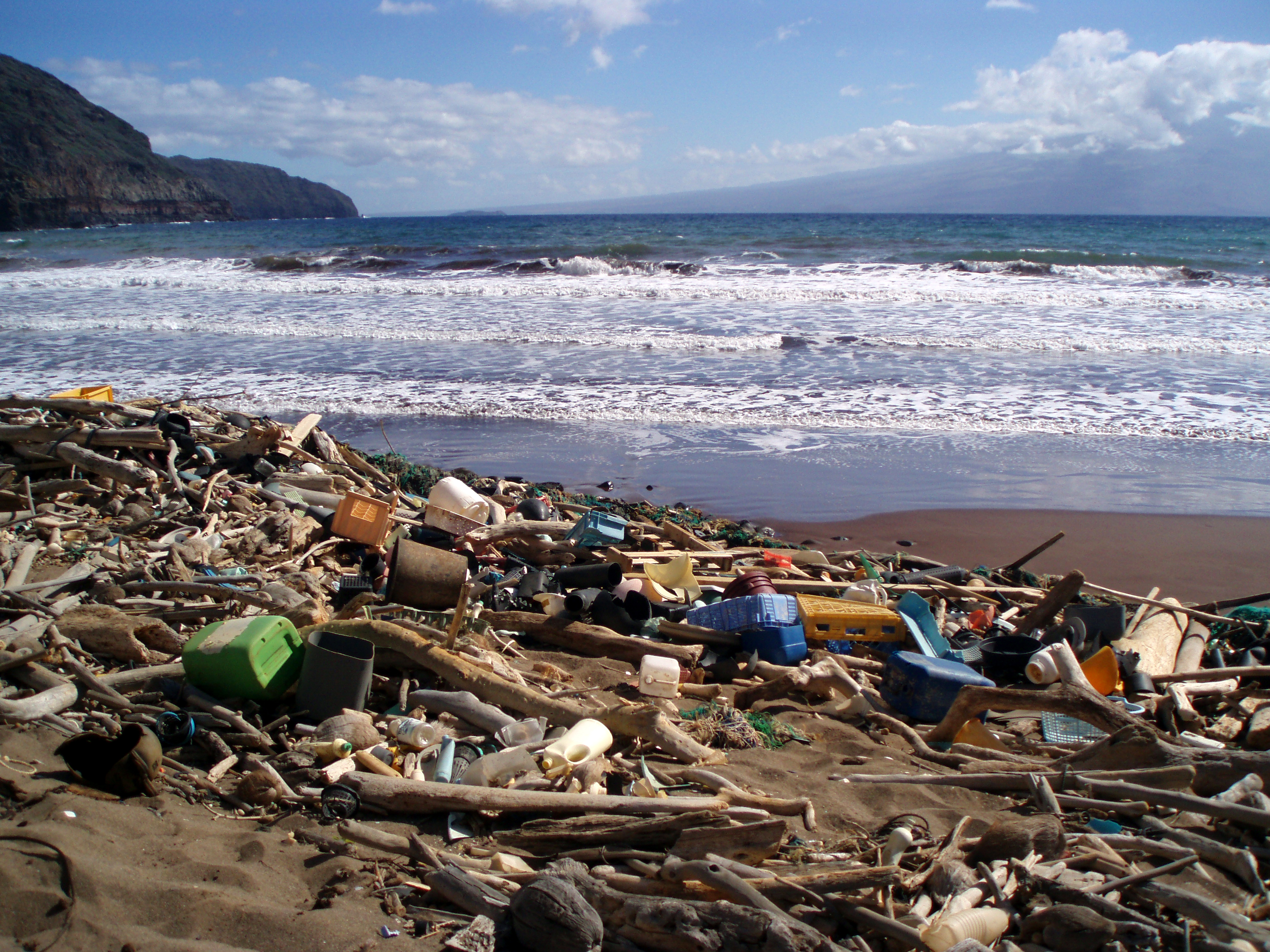
The beach at Kanapou Bay on the east coast of Kahoʻolawe collects driftwood and plastics (2013)

Studies show that the tourism sector accounts for 10.7% of Hawaii's waste generation. The average guest generates approximately 3.3 kilograms (7.3 lb) of waste per day. In order to reduce the generation of plastic waste, Hawaii has begun to ban the use of single-use plastic and polystyrene foam on a county-by-county basis. A ban on polystyrene foam containers took effect in Maui County on December 31, 2018; a similar ban started in Hawaii County (the Big Island) on July 1, 2019. Oahu's ban on single-use plastic and polystyrene went into effect on January 1, 2021. Two bills were considered by the Hawaii State Legislature in early 2019, which would have been the first state-wide bans on food service plastics in America. SB367 would ban the use of polystrene foam food containers statewide; that bill died in committee in March 2019. SB522 would ban single-use plastic beverage bottles, utensils, stirring sticks, polystyrene foam containers, and straws starting in 2021; that bill was modified in committee to create a working group to make recommendations on how to reduce plastic waste instead.

The beaches in Hawaii are becoming increasingly filled with trash, especially plastics. This becomes a problem not only environmentally, but also could have a negative impact on the economy, as visitors come for the sandy beaches and pollutants such as trash or plastics decrease the appeal of Hawaii as a vacation destination. Kamilo Beach on the southeastern tip of the island of Hawaii has acquired the nickname "Plastic Beach" for its accumulation of plastic trash, much of it borne via ocean currents and trade winds from the nearby Great Pacific Garbage Patch. It is estimated that 15 to 20 short tons (14 to 18 t) of trash, 96% of which is plastic, washes ashore here annually. An often unknown source of pollution near beaches is sunscreens that contain petrochemical-based UV filters. These chemicals can damage the beaches as well as the nearby coral reef habitats.

=== Social effect ===
Academics trace the potential social harms of Hawaiian tourism back to its beginning. In anthropologist Jane C. Desmond's article "Picturing Hawai'i: The "Ideal" Native and the Origins of Tourism, 1880-1915", Desmond claims that early tourism offered visitors "an alluring encounter with paradisical exoticism, a nonthreatening soft primitivism--primitive, yes, but delightfully so." In illustrating Native Hawaiians as primitive, the tourism industry "commodifie[d]" their image by seeing them as "attractive, warm, welcoming, unthreatening, generous hosts." The tourism industry also commodifies cultural norms of Hawai'i.

The essay "Lovely Hula Lands" (later republished as "Lovely Hula Hands") by native Hawaiian academic and activist Haunani-Kay Trask is severely critical of the huge influx of tourists to Hawaiʻi, which she terms a "prostitution" of Hawaiian culture. She ends her essay with "let me just leave this thought behind. If you are thinking of visiting my homeland, please don't. We don't want or need any more tourists, and we certainly don't like them." However, the Southern Poverty Law Center (SPLC) has condemned Trask for her anti-American statements, stating that such vitriol helps fuel racism in Hawaiʻi.

Some Native Hawaiians believe strongly in the independence of Hawaii and the Hawaiian sovereignty movement. The creation of this grassroots organization leads to a negative view towards visitors and the disruption of the natural land. This leads to a strong contention between developers and natives who believe the land should not be transformed into a commercial or residential development. Many of these individuals are reliant on the land as a means of living. The loss of the environment affects the socio-psychological well-being of those reliant on land and marine resources. Native Hawaiians and residents alike become limited in job opportunities with a heavily skewed job-base in the tourism industry. Many Hawaiian residents and natives do understand the importance of the state's tourism industry and that, unfortunately, it can come with negative environmental consequences.

The scholar Liza Keānuenueokalani Williams, has looked at the capitalist links between tourism, the military, and the prison industrial complex. Her work examines that the "fantasy of tropical aloha" is Hawai'i's "most common commodity," and the introduction of more tourists by means of advertisements exacerbates "dispossession and occupation" problems facing Native Hawaiians.

Additionally, Jon Matsuoka, a member of the Hawai'i Civil Rights Commission, claims that tourism influences the behaviors of Native Hawaiians in negative lenses, such as "increased substance abuse and the proliferation of welfare dependence"

== See also ==
- List of National Historic Landmarks in Hawaiʻi
- Golf Clubs and Courses in Hawaii
