= LPGA Skins Game =

Golf tournament formerly on the LPGA Tour

The LPGA Skins Game was an unofficial-money golf tournament on the LPGA Tour from 1990 to 2003. It was played at the Stonebriar Country Club in Frisco, Texas from 1990 to 1998 and at the Wailea Golf Club in Wailea, Hawaii in 2003.

== Winners ==
ConAgra LPGA Skins Game

- 2003 Karrie Webb

JCPenney/LPGA Skins Game

- 1999-2002 No tournament
- 1998 Laura Davies
- 1997 Annika Sörenstam
- 1996 Laura Davies
- 1995 Dottie Mochrie
- 1994 Patty Sheehan
- 1993 Betsy King
- 1992 Pat Bradley
- 1991 No tournament
- 1990 Jan Stephenson
