= Four Seasons Resort Maui =

Luxury hotel in Maui

Four Seasons Maui
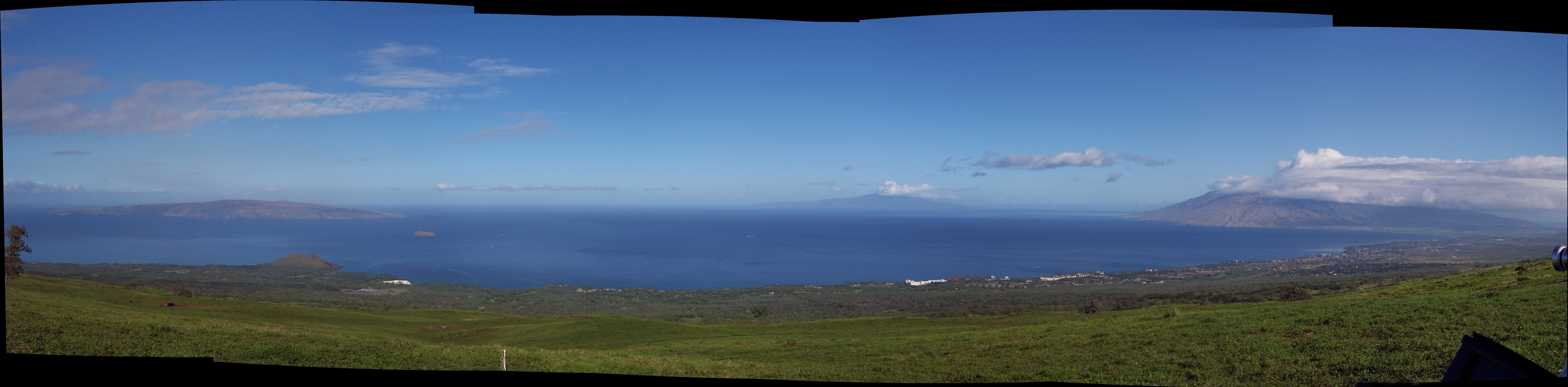
- A panoramic of the view of Wailea and Makena from the road to Kula
- Hotel chain: Four Seasons Hotels

General information
- Status: Operating
- Type: Hotel
- Location: 3900 Wailea Alanui Dr, Kihei, Hawaii 96753, U.S.
- Coordinates: 20°40′49″N 156°26′30″W
- Opening: February 9, 1990; 36 years ago
- Renovated: 2007; 2014-2016
- Owner: Michael Dell

Design and construction
- Developer: Christopher Hemmeter Takeshi Sekiguchi

Other information
- Number of rooms: 383
- Number of restaurants: 4

Four Seasons Resort Maui at Wailea is a resort in Wailea, on the island of Maui in Hawaii. It is part of the Four Seasons luxury hotels chain. It is the only resort on Maui to receive both the AAA Five Diamond Award and the Forbes (formerly Mobil) Five-Star Award. Room rates range from $845 to $25,000 per night. It has four restaurants and bars, including one of Wolfgang Puck's Spago chain.

== History ==
The hotel is the smaller of two major hotels built on a large parcel of Wailea coast real estate under development by Hawaiian developer Christopher Hemmeter together with his Japanese partner, Takeshi Sekiguchi. The Four Seasons hotel was developed by Four Seasons in collaboration with Sekiguchi's TSA International and Shimizu Corporation, with a construction cost of approximately $180 million. It was the first Four Seasons project in Hawaii and, when it opened, was Four Seasons' third resort property. Located on 15 acres, adjacent to the larger, Sekiguchi-developed Grand Wailea resort, the Four Seasons Maui opened on February 9, 1990.

In 2000, Shimizu, the owner of the property, tried unsuccessfully to sell it. In 2004, MSD Capital, an investment company controlled by billionaire Michael Dell, bought the resort for $280 million. After running into cash-flow difficulties and defaulting on its loan payments in 2010, MSD successfully refinanced the property in 2011.

In 2007 the Four Seasons underwent a $50 million renovation of its 380 guest rooms and suites, also adding technology for guestrooms, a new restaurant, and an art museum.

Beginning in late 2014, the resort underwent a two-year renovation project where the 383 rooms and suites were updated, a new art collection was installed, the resort grounds were revamped, and new event spaces were added.

The penultimate episode of the first season of Modern Family, Hawaii, took place at the resort in 2010.

The White Lotus was filmed at the resort in 2020.

In 2025, the Four Seasons Maui announced the debut the Maile Presidential Suite—a 4,000 sq ft (375 sq meter) private residence designed by Meyer Davis. The suite starts at $31,000 per night.

== Amenities ==
The resort has three par-72 championship golf courses, one of which hosted the ConAgra LPGA Skins Game in 2003. The Spago restaurant, was awarded a Four-Star ranking by Mobil Travel. The resort offers two more restaurants, including DUO Steak and Seafood. Some other amenities include spa services, four pools, and fitness facilities.
