= Grand Wailea Resort =

Luxury resort in Hawaii

Grand Wailea Resort & Spa
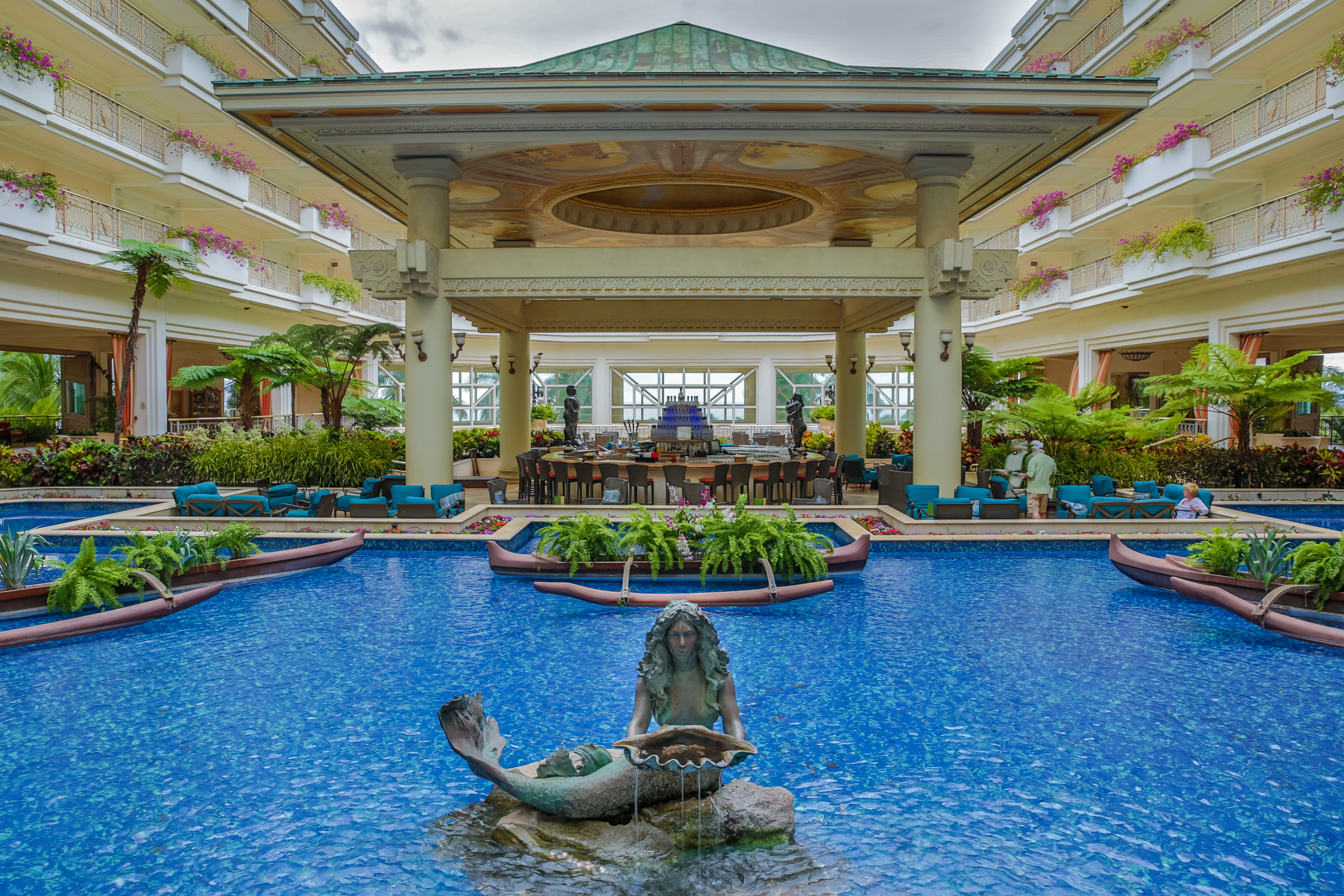
- Interactive map of the Grand Wailea Resort & Spa area
- Hotel chain: Waldorf Astoria

General information
- Location: Wailea, Hawaii, 3850 Wailea Alanui Drive
- Coordinates: 20.681173°N 156.438695°W
- Opened: 1991
- Owner: BRE Hotels & Resorts
- Management: Hilton Worldwide

Technical details
- Grounds: 40 acres

Design and construction
- Developer: Takashi Sekiguchi

Other information
- Number of rooms: 787
- Number of suites: 52
- Number of restaurants: 5
- Number of bars: 4

Website
- Official website

The Grand Wailea Resort & Spa is a 40-acre Waldorf Astoria luxury resort located on the beach in Wailea, Maui, Hawaii. The hotel opened in 1991 as the Grand Hyatt Wailea. The Grand Wailea is owned by BRE Hotels & Resorts and is the largest private employer on the island of Maui.

== History ==
The hotel was built by Japanese developer Takeshi Sekiguchi, who also put together a large art collection for the hotel. It opened in 1991 as the Grand Hyatt Wailea. The hotel was built at an estimated cost of $650 million, which proved to be more than the economy could sustain, and Sekiguchi lost control of the property, which was sold for $263 million in 1998. The property has been sold several times since then and it is now operated by Hilton Worldwide. It was the first hotel to join Hilton's Waldorf Astoria Hotels & Resorts in 2006 after the Manhattan hotel became a brand. It is the second largest hotel on the island of Maui and is one of Hawaii's most well-known resorts. It is also the site of the first water elevator and the first rotating barrel pipe ride.

In November 2019, the hotel launched a charitable foundation, the Grand Wailea Foundation, which aims to contribute $250,000 annually to nonprofit organizations in south and west Maui. The first funds were distributed at the Grand Wailea's annual Christmas tree lighting ceremony on December 1, 2019. The first recipients, Hui o Wa‘a Kaulua, Maui Historical Society, and the Boys & Girls Club of Maui, were awarded $10,000 each. Nonprofits are allowed to apply for funding on the foundation's website.

The resort hopes to achieve net zero water usage in 2020, and distributes cultural and sustainability information to guests upon their arrival.

== Accommodation ==
=== Villas ===
The resort has one, two, and three bedroom villas which are across the street from the hotel. The villas, named Ho'olei at Grand Wailea, are two-stories, have a full-sized kitchen, outdoor barbecue, and one-car garages. All the villas have their lanais (decks) facing West.

=== Rooms ===
The hotel has 830 guest rooms, suites, and villas.

=== Napua Tower ===
There are 100 rooms in the Napua Tower. The rooms in the tower are upgraded, and guests receive complimentary concierge services. Rooms range from 640-5,500 square feet. The tower is home to some of the hotel's suites, including the Two Grand Suites which are equal in size and the largest suite category available (approx nightly cost $10,600).

== Facilities and services ==
=== Pools ===
Wailea Canyon Activity Pool The Canyon Activity Pool is a 2,000-foot-long, 25,700 total square foot, 770,000-gallon pool. It consists of nine pools on six separate levels, connected by a river. There are four small intertwining slides, two big waterslides, a whitewater rapids slide, a rope swing, a sand beach pool, three Jacuzzis, six waterfalls, a water elevator and an infant pool. The water elevator is the world's first. The pool also has a swim-up bar.

Hibiscus Pool The Hibiscus Pool is 4,850 square feet. There is an image of a hibiscus flower on the bottom of the pool which is made from 630,000 pieces of Mexican glass mosaic tile. The pool itself is made from 2.2 million tiles. It has two Jacuzzis.

Scuba Dive Training Pool The hotel has on-staff scuba instructors and a scuba dive training pool. It is the only custom-designed scuba pool in Hawaii. Beginning scuba divers practice in the dive pool as well as parts of the activity pool before going out into the ocean.

Fishpipe The Fishpipe is a rotating barrel pipe. It is a type of water ride that simulates a waterslide and allows up to three people to ride at once. The pipe has a top speed of 11 mph and is the first rotating barrel ride in the world. The barrels are made up of over 150 square meters of transparent plastic material, more than 1200 anchor points, 600 brightly colored nylon cords, and 50 meters of polyester webbing.

=== Spa Grande ===
Spa Grande is the largest spa in Hawaii, with 50,000 square feet. There are 40 treatment rooms. The spa has cascading waterfall showers, a Roman tub, saunas, a Japanese furo and five specialty bath and Swiss jet showers. The Grand Salon is a hair and nail salon also located at Spa Grande.

=== Palaha Hawaiian Cultural Center ===
In 2006, the hotel closed its nightclub used the space to host special events, planning to open a cultural space. On February 6, 2020, the Palaha Hawaiian Cultural Center opened. The center hosts daily cultural experiences and showcases Hawaiian art.

== Restorations and expansions ==
In 2008 the hotel underwent a $50 million restoration project. The project renovated the Botero Bar, the Arrival and Departure Lounge, added new furniture, and placed flatscreen televisions in each room. The spa was also upgraded with new carpet and furniture. In 2012, the hotel planned a five-year $250 million expansion. The expansion involved additional rooms, new restaurants, new in-room technology, and a new pool. New renovations began in October 2014, room renovations and the pool refresh were completed in late 2017. In 2019, the hotel proposed expansion plans, which were met with opposition from local Hawaiians since the hotel was built on sacred burial grounds. The plans were postponed in February 2020 by the Maui Planning commission due to community pushback. The expansions were set to cost approximately $150 million.

== In popular culture ==
Many celebrities have been known to stay at the Hotel including Steve Carell, Tiffany Haddish, Odessa Rae, Cuba Gooding Jr., Spencer Grammer, Kevin Bacon, Kenny Aronoff, Magic Johnson, Common, Redfoo, Jason Collins, Albert Brooks, Paris Hilton, JT Mollner, Amy Redford, Tony Kanal, Tulsi Gabbard, and Oprah Winfrey.

Films

- Just Go With It (2011) was filmed at the hotel
