= Wailea, Hawaii =

Wailea
- Census-designated place
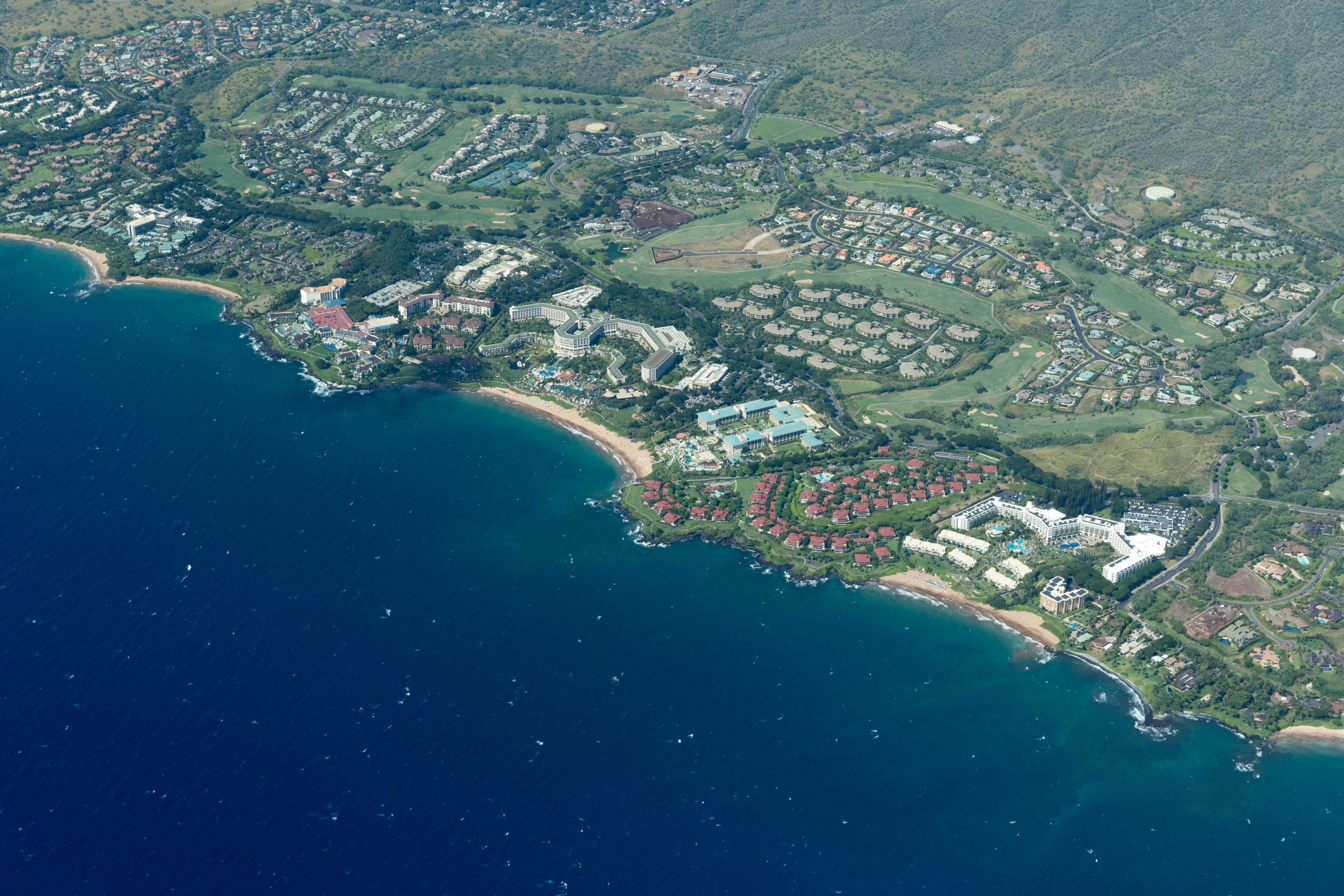
- Interactive map of Wailea
- Coordinates: 20°41′24″N 156°26′21″W
- Country: United States
- State: Hawaii
- County: Maui

Area
  - Total: 10.74 sq mi (27.82 km^{2})
  - Land: 7.44 sq mi (19.28 km^{2})
  - Water: 3.30 sq mi (8.54 km^{2})

Population (2020)
  - Total: 6,027
  - Density: 809.6/sq mi (312.59/km^{2})
- Time zone: UTC-10 (Hawaii-Aleutian)
- Area code: 808
- FIPS code: 15-76935

Wailea is a census-designated place (CDP) in Maui County, Hawaii, United States. As of the 2020 census, it had a population of 6,027. Prior to 2010, the area was part of the Wailea-Makena census-designated place. The community was developed in 1971 by a partnership of Alexander & Baldwin and Northwestern Mutual.

== Geography ==
Wailea is located at 20°41′24″N 156°26′21″W (20.690104, -156.439108).

According to the United States Census Bureau, the CDP covers an area of 10.7 square miles (27.8 km^{2}), of which 7.5 square miles (19.3 km^{2}) is land and 3.3 square miles (8.5 km^{2}), or 30.70%, is water.

Wailea is bordered by Makena to the south, Kihei to the north, the Pacific to the west and Haleakalā to the east.

Wailea has multiple beaches, including Polo, Wailea, Ulua, Mokapu, and Keawakapu.

== Demographics ==
Historical population
Census	Pop.	Note	%±
2020	6,027		—
U.S. Decennial Census

=== 2020 census ===
As of the 2020 census, Wailea had a population of 6,027. The median age was 56.2 years. 11.9% of residents were under the age of 18 and 33.3% of residents were 65 years of age or older. For every 100 females there were 102.5 males, and for every 100 females age 18 and over there were 101.7 males age 18 and over.

99.5% of residents lived in urban areas, while 0.5% lived in rural areas.

There were 2,802 households in Wailea, of which 16.6% had children under the age of 18 living in them. Of all households, 49.5% were married-couple households, 19.9% were households with a male householder and no spouse or partner present, and 23.3% were households with a female householder and no spouse or partner present. About 29.6% of all households were made up of individuals and 13.8% had someone living alone who was 65 years of age or older.

There were 5,519 housing units, of which 49.2% were vacant. The homeowner vacancy rate was 2.8% and the rental vacancy rate was 21.6%.

Racial composition as of the 2020 census
Race	Number	Percent
White	4,480	74.3%
Black or African American	51	0.8%
American Indian and Alaska Native	17	0.3%
Asian	491	8.1%
Native Hawaiian and Other Pacific Islander	152	2.5%
Some other race	135	2.2%
Two or more races	701	11.6%
Hispanic or Latino (of any race)	448	7.4%

== Resorts ==
Wailea Resort is a 1,500-acre (6.1 km^{2}), master-planned resort located on Maui's sunny, southern leeward coast. Its development is guided by two important documents: a master plan that ostensibly ensures low density and good community planning, and the Wailea Community Association's design guidelines which claim to preserve Maui's island environment in all new building projects. Both documents are administered by the Wailea Community Association, which has long combined professional management (since 1984) and volunteer owner control of the Board of Directors (since 1999) to effectively manage the community in a customer service manner for all stakeholders: residents, hotels, commercial owners, and tourists. Wailea was named one of the country's 99 Best Recreational & Residential Private Communities in America. Many of Wailea's single-family and condominium complexes offer gated entryways for enhanced security and privacy. Utilities are buried underground, and roadways are landscaped. Nearby are Wailea's many amenities, including restaurants, championship golf courses, tennis facilities, shopping, and beaches.

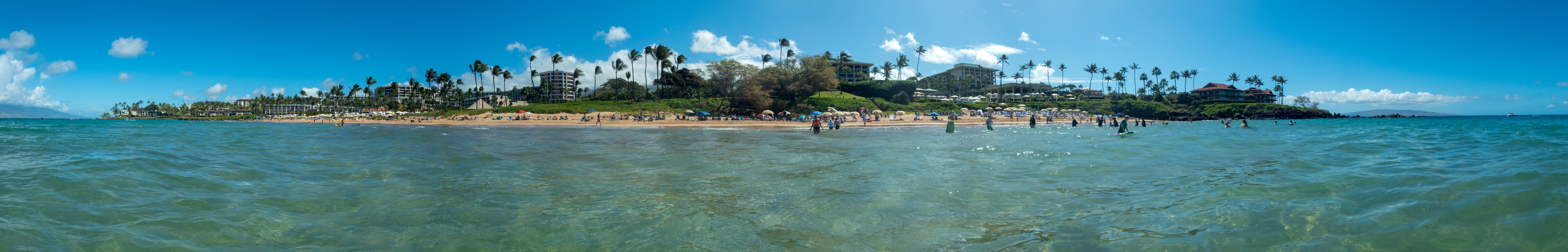
Panoramic view of Wailea Beach from water

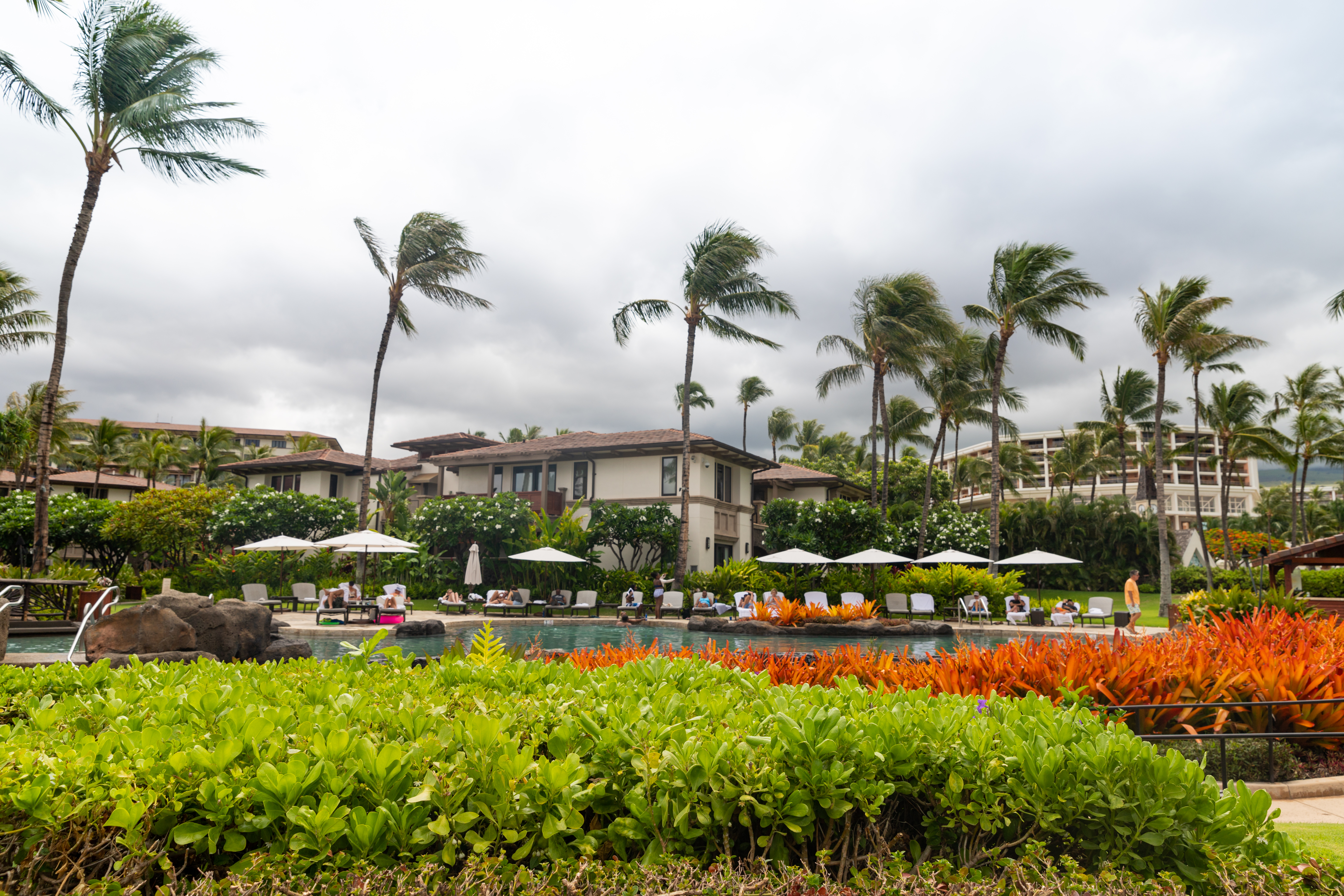
Wailea beach resort, Maui, Hawaii

== Economy ==
Major employers in Wailea include the Grand Wailea Resort, Four Seasons Resort Maui, Fairmont Kea Lani, Marriott Wailea Beach, the Wailea Golf Club, Wailea Beach Villas, Tommy Bahama, Spago, Polo Beach Club, Wailea Grand Champions, and Destination Residences Hawaii.

== History ==
Wailea was originally a fishing settlement and its name translates to “water of lea” the goddess of canoe-builders. Legend has it she transformed the area into a beautiful forest for birds and would frequently fly above it to appreciate its beauty. In ancient Hawaiian times natives would settle toward the mountains of Wailea where they grew sweet potatoes (uala) and would venture down to the shore to fish.

In the past two centuries cattle raising became a mainstay of the economy and led to the formation of places such as Ulupalakua Ranch.

== See also ==
- List of beaches in Hawaii#Maui

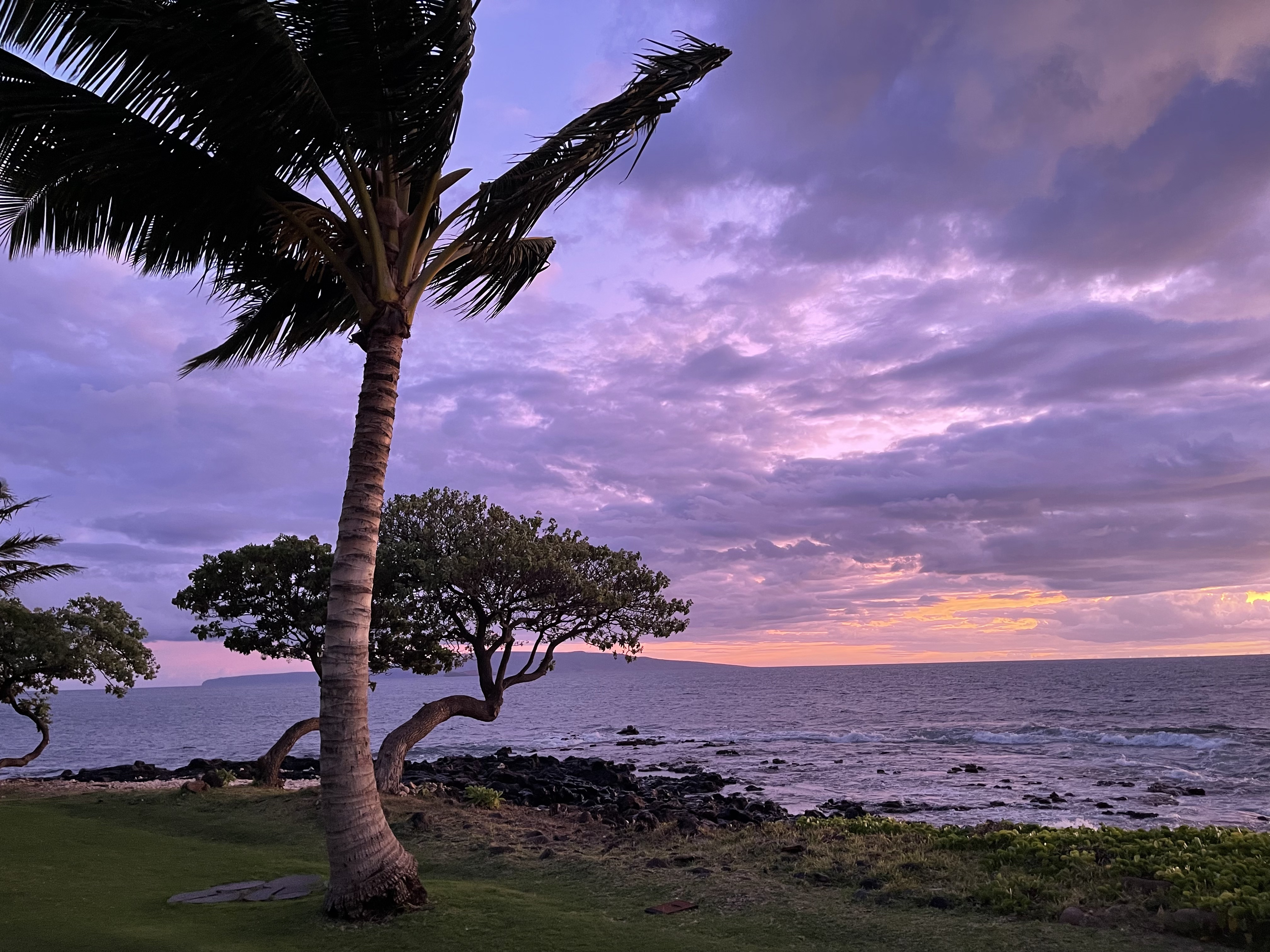
Sunset in Wailea
