= Polynesian Football Hall of Fame =

Hall of fame on American football

Coordinates: 21°38′26.39″N 157°55′16.8″W

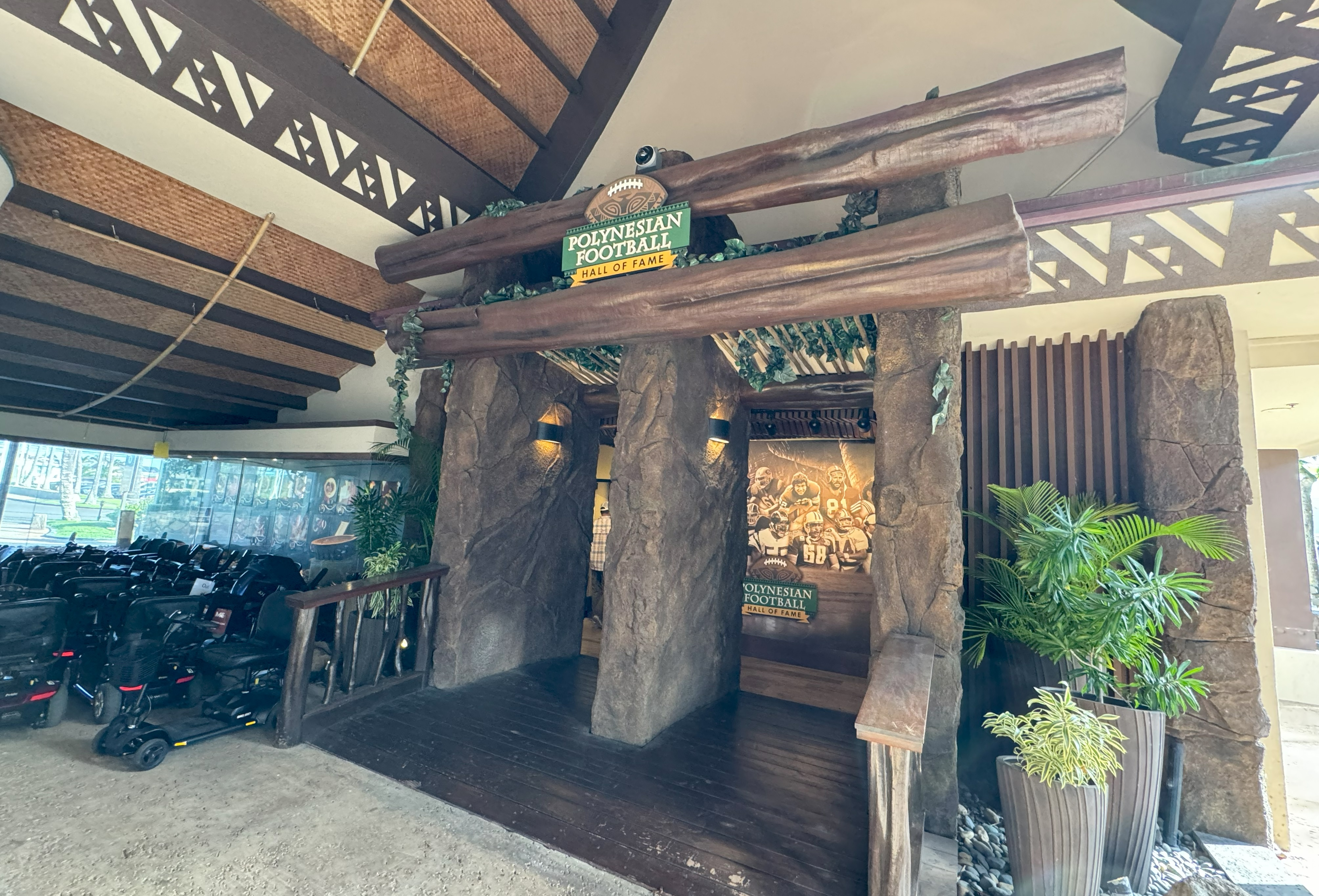
Polynesian Football Hall of Fame entrance

The Polynesian Football Hall of Fame is a hall of fame that honors the greatest players, coaches, and contributors of Polynesian descent in the sport of American football. It was established in 2013 by former National Football League (NFL) players Jesse Sapolu and Maa Tanuvasa. Board members include Troy Polamalu, Via Sikahema, June Jones, and Reno Mahe.

The hall is located at the Polynesian Cultural Center in Oahu, Hawaii.

== Inductees ==
2014

- Kurt Gouveia
- Olin Kreutz
- Kevin Mawae
- Junior Seau
- Jack Thompson
- Herman Wedemeyer
- Ken Niumatalolo

2015

- Luther Elliss
- Jesse Sapolu
- Ray Schoenke
- Mosi Tatupu
- Mark Tuinei
- Russ Francis

2016

- Charlie Ane
- Rocky Freitas
- Troy Polamalu
- Vai Sikahema
- Al Lolotai

2017

- Junior Ah You
- Riki Ellison
- Chris Naeole
- Maa Tanuvasa
- John Manumaleuna

2018

- Bob Apisa
- Herman Clark
- Ma'ake Kemoeatu
- Manu Tuiasosopo
- Kimo von Oelhoffen

2019

- Joe Salave'a
- Dan Saleaumua
- Lofa Tatupu
- Marques Tuiasosopo

2020

- David Dixon
- Frank Manumaleuga
- Haloti Ngata
- Dominic Raiola

2021

- Al Noga
- Niko Noga
- Charlie Wedemeyer

2022

- Malcom Floyd
- Mike Iupati
- Tom Kaulukukui

2023

- Harry Field
- Manti Te'o
- Larry Warford

2024

- Dwayne Johnson
- Reno Mahe
- Domata Peko

2025

- Chris Kemoeatu
- Jim Nicholson
- Kalani Sitake

2026

- Brandon Manumaleuna
- Rey Maualuga
- Chad Owens

== Polynesian Bowl ==
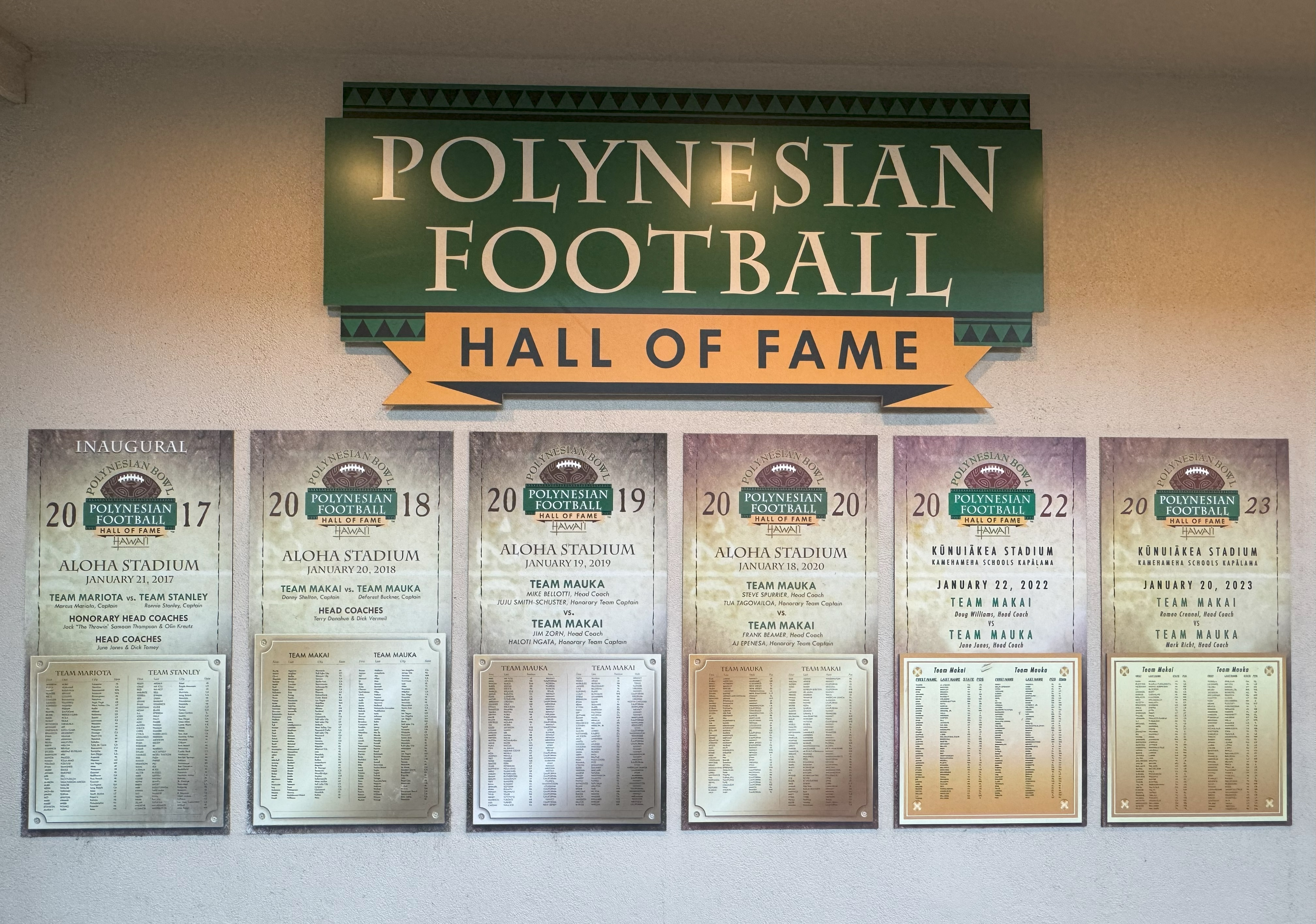
Polynesian Bowl results from 2017 to 2023 outside the Hall of Fame

In 2017, the organization began to back a high school football all-star game known as the Polynesian Bowl, held at Aloha Stadium. The game was moved to Kūnuiākea Stadium in 2022 on a three-year deal, after which it began taking place at Clarence T. C. Ching Athletics Complex.

=== Game results ===
Year	Date	Winning team	Score	Losing team	Ref
2017	January 21	Team Stanley	9–7	Team Mariota	
2018	January 20	Team Makai	31–14	Team Mauka	
2019	January 19	Team Makai	27–7	Team Mauka	
2020	January 18	Team Mauka	20–13	Team Makai	
2021	Not held due to COVID-19 pandemic				
2022	January 22	Team Makai	17–3	Team Mauka	
2023	January 20	Team Mauka	22–17	Team Makai	
2024	January 19	Team Makai	28–17	Team Mauka	
2025	January 17	Team Makai	28–21	Team Mauka	
2026	January 16	Team Mauka	14–3	Team Makai	

=== Most Valuable Players ===
Year	Offensive MVP	Defensive MVP	Ref
2017	Connor Wedington, RB (Sumner (WA))	A. J. Epenesa, LB (Edwardsville)	
2018	Tanner McKee, QB (Centennial (CA))	Kyler Gordon, CB (Archbishop Murphy)	
2019	Puka Nacua, WR (Orem)	Daniel Heimuli, LB (Menlo-Atherton)	
2020	Sol-Jay Maiava, QB (St. John's College)	Meki Pei, DB ('Iolani)	
2021	No game		
2022	Travis Hunter, WR/CB (Collins Hill)	Jaishawn Barham, LB (Saint Frances (MD))	
2023	Nico Iamaleava, QB (Warren (CA))	Andrew Harris, LB (Lake Brantley)	
2024	Mike Matthews, WR (Parkview (GA))	David Stone, LB (IMG Academy)	
2025	Husan Longstreet, QB (Centennial (CA)); Dakorien Moore, WR (Duncanville)	Deuce Geralds, DL (Collins Hill)	
2026	Eric McFarland III, WR (IMG Academy)	George Toia, DL (Byron Nelson)	

== See also ==
- Polynesian Football Player of the Year Award
