= Leo Reed =

American labor union leader (1939–2022)

Leo T Reed
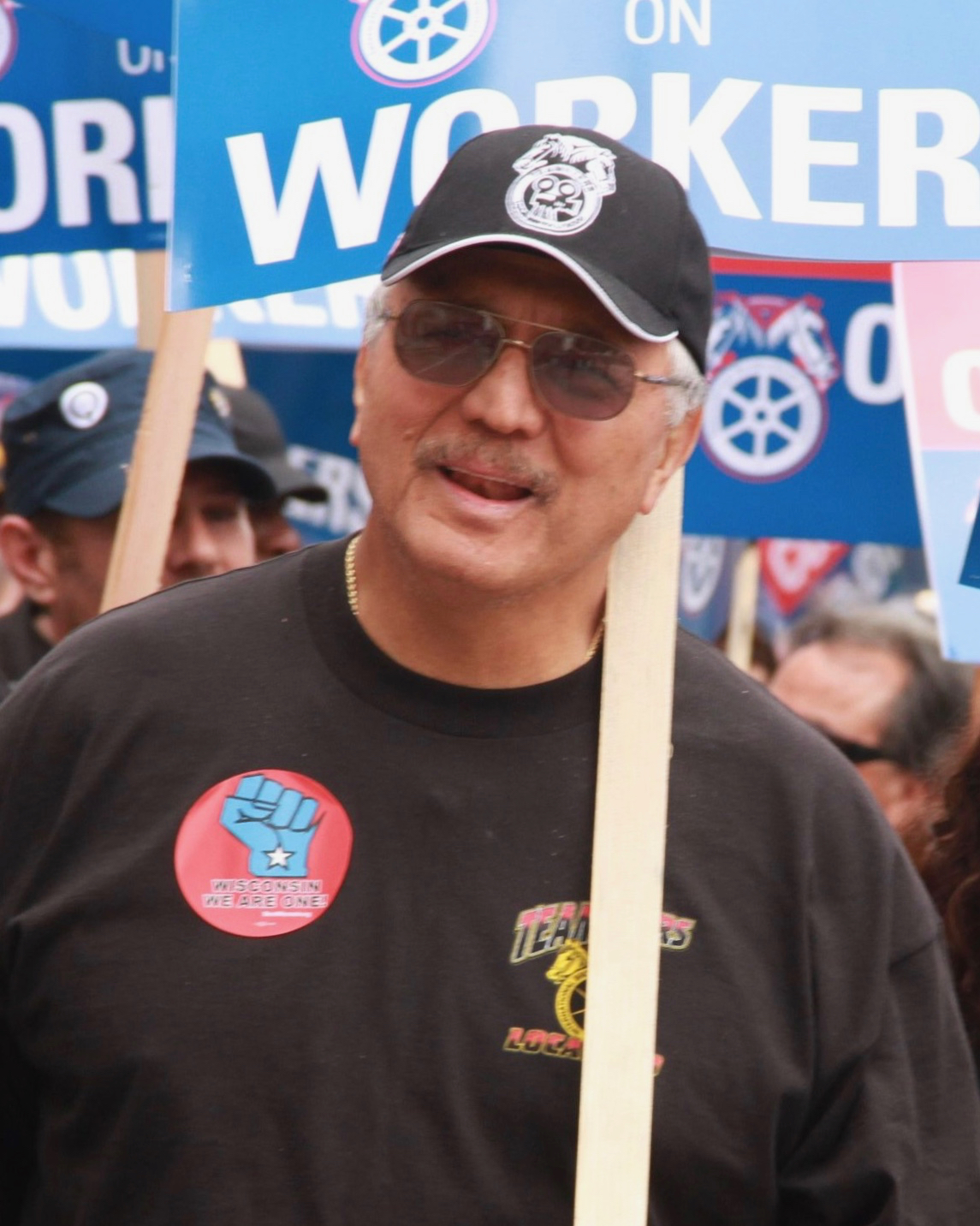

Director, Teamsters Motion Picture and Theatrical Trades Division
- In office 1993–2013

Personal details
- Born: Leo Tautua Tanoa'i Reed; January 3, 1939 Kahuku, Hawaii, U.S.
- Died: February 27, 2022 (aged 83) Los Angeles, California, U.S.
- Football career

Profile
- Positions: Offensive guard/ Offensive tackle

Personal information
- Listed height: 6 ft 4 in (1.93 m)
- Listed weight: 240 lb (109 kg)

Career information
- High school: Kahuku
- College: Colorado State University
- NFL draft: 1961: 20th round, 274th overall pick

Career history
- Houston Oilers (1961); Denver Broncos (1961); Indianapolis Warriors (1962)

Awards and highlights
- 1962 Official All-UFL Team
- Stats at Pro Football Reference

Leo Tautua Tanoa'i Reed (January 3, 1939 – February 27, 2022) was an American labor leader and the longtime director of the International Brotherhood of Teamsters (IBT) Motion Picture and Theatrical Trades Division. Reed first became a business agent for the Hawaii Government Employees Association (HGEA) in 1973, where his natural leadership and charisma attracted the attention of Hawaii labor leader Art Rutledge, who recruited him to be a business agent for Hawaii Teamsters Local 996 in 1975.

In 1980, Reed moved to Los Angeles to join Hollywood Teamsters Local 399, representing studio drivers, and was responsible for increasing the membership to 5,500 members and organizing location managers and casting directors under the local.

Known as tough negotiator who understood the needs of the rank and file members, Reed was elected as its secretary-treasurer, 399's principal officer in 1988, and appointed Director of the Motion Picture and Theatrical Trades Division for the IBT in 1993. Reed won an unprecedented eight terms as 399's principal officer, during which time he united the efforts of motion picture locals across the nation to prevent the studios from simply moving to another area to avoid a strike, and publicly supporting the negotiating efforts of fellow motion picture guilds.

Reed finally stepped down in 2013 after 25 years in office. His successor at the local, Steve Dayan, named Reed Secretary-Treasurer Emeritus and established the Leo T. Reed Scholarship in 2016, honoring Reed’s countless contributions to its members, and helping to send a dozen kids of local 399 members every year to college.

The eldest of 5 kids, Reed was born on the North shore of Oahu to a Scots-Irish US Army Sergeant stationed in Hawaii, Thomas "Leo" Reed, who married Vaita’i Tanoai, a daughter of the first generation of Samoan Americans to immigrate to Hawaii to help build the Hawaii LDS Temple in Laie, and was raised in a Mormon household.

One of the first wave of Polynesians in American football, Reed was the first graduate of the now football powerhouse Kahuku High to play professional football, earning a football scholarship to the University of Colorado and go on to play for the Denver Broncos and the 1961 AFC Champion Houston Oilers. Reed credits Al Lolotai, the first Samoan to play pro football as a mentor, then the athletic director of Church College of Hawaii.

Sent down to the UFL Indianapolis Warriors in 1962, Reed returned to Hawaii in 1964 and joined the Honolulu Police Department prior to becoming a labor representative.

Reed is an uncle of Hollywood stuntman Tanoai Reed, and a cousin to actor Dwayne Johnson's grandfather, Peter Maivia.
