= Kemoeatu =

Kemoeatu is a surname. Notable people with the surname include:

- Chris Kemoeatu (born 1983), Tongan-American football player
- Maʻake Kemoeatu (born 1979), Tongan-American football player
