= Kona Schwenke =

American football player (1992–2018)

No. 96
- Position: Defensive tackle

Personal information
- Born: May 11, 1992; San Jose, California, U.S.
- Died: April 22, 2018 (aged 25); Laie, Hawaii, U.S.
- Listed height: 6 ft 4 in (1.93 m)
- Listed weight: 346 lb (157 kg)

Career information
- High school: Kahuku (Kahuku, Hawaii)
- College: Notre Dame
- NFL draft: 2014: undrafted

Career history
- Kansas City Chiefs (2014)*; New England Patriots (2014)*; New York Jets (2014)*; Oakland Raiders (2015)*; Seattle Seahawks (2015)
- * Offseason or practice squad member only
- Stats at Pro Football Reference

Kona McKay Schwenke (May 11, 1992 – April 22, 2018) was an American football defensive tackle who played college football at Notre Dame.

== Early life ==
Kona Schwenke was born to McKay and Angela Schwenke. Schwenke attended Kahuku High School in Kahuku, Hawaii where he graduated in 2010.

== College career ==
Schwenke committed to Notre Dame on February 3, 2010. Schwenke played all four years on the defensive line with the Fighting Irish, playing in 31 games over that span.

== Professional career ==
=== Kansas City Chiefs ===
Schwenke went undrafted and signed a free agent deal with the Kansas City Chiefs on May 19, 2014. On August 30, 2014 Schwenke was released by the Chiefs as part of their final preseason roster cuts. The following day Schwenke was signed to the Chiefs' practice squad. On September 11, 2014 Schwenke was released from the practice squad to make room for Daniel Sorensen.

=== New England Patriots ===
On September 16, 2014, the New England Patriots signed Schwenke to their practice squad. Schwenke was released from the practice squad on November 5, 2014 to make room for Jonathan Krause.

=== New York Jets ===
On December 4, 2014 Schwenke was signed to the New York Jets' practice squad and remain there until the end of the season.

=== Oakland Raiders ===
On December 30, 2014 Schwenke signed a futures contract with the Oakland Raiders.

=== Seattle Seahawks ===
On May 11, 2015 Schwenke was signed by the Seattle Seahawks after a three-day rookie mini-camp. On August 21, in a preseason game against the Kansas City Chiefs, Schwenke suffered a torn ACL in his right knee and was subsequently waived the following day. After clearing waivers Schwenke was placed on the Seahawks' injured reserve list. Seahawks waived Schwenke on August 6, 2016 after they signed Jahri Evans.

Schwenke worked out for the Canadian Football League's Hamilton Tiger-Cats during the 2017 preseason but was not signed to a contract.

== Death ==
On April 22, 2018, Schwenke died in his sleep. Coroners later determined that he had drugs in his system.
