= Stan Mataele =

American football player (born 1963)

No. 94
- Position: Nose tackle

Personal information
- Born: June 24, 1963 (age 63); Tonga
- Listed height: 6 ft 2 in (1.88 m)
- Listed weight: 278 lb (126 kg)

Career information
- High school: Kahuku (Kahuku, Hawaii, U.S)
- College: Sacramento CC (1983–1984); Arizona (1985–1986)
- NFL draft: 1987: 8th round, 197th overall pick

Career history
- Tampa Bay Buccaneers (1987)*; Green Bay Packers (1987)
- * Offseason or practice squad member only

Awards and highlights
- Second-team All-Pac-10 (1986)

Career NFL statistics
- Games played: 2
- Stats at Pro Football Reference

Stan Mataele (born June 24, 1963) is a Tongan former professional American football player who was a nose tackle for one season in the National Football League (NFL) for the Green Bay Packers. He played college football at Sacramento City College and Arizona and was selected by the Tampa Bay Buccaneers in the eighth round of the 1987 NFL draft.

== Early life and education ==
Mataele was born on June 24, 1963, in Tonga. He and Lakei Heimuli were the first Tongan players in the NFL. He grew up in Hawaii and enjoyed surfing, weightlifting, playing rugby football and playing piano. He attended Kahuku High School but did not play sports there.

When visiting a family member in Sacramento, California, Mataele decided he liked the city and opted to enroll at Sacramento City College. He was spotted one day while lifting weights by the college's American football coach, who asked him if he had ever played the sport before. He wanted to try it out, so he lied and said that he did play. However, Mataele said that the first day in practice, the coach "immediately knew I hadn't." He was still kept on the team, however; the Arizona Republic said that "The fact that Mataele can bench press 505 pounds might have entered into the decision."

A defensive end, he was able to earn All-California junior college honors at Sacramento. He also tried out for the track and field team and made it as a participant in the hammer throw; although he struggled at first, he became a top player for the school by the midway point of his first season, winning a state meet with a state community college record. He later broke his own record and reached the Northern California hammer throw finals. Following the 1984 football season, he committed to continue his career with the Arizona Wildcats.

Mataele entered the 1985 season as a backup at nose tackle, later moved up to the starting role, and then shifted to defensive tackle. He helped them place second in their conference in yards-per-game allowed and first in points-per-game allowed. He also joined the Arizona track and field team, setting the school record for hammer throw. As a senior, he was selected second-team All-West Coast, second-team All-Pac-10, and was invited to the Hula Bowl after leading the Pac-10 with 10 and 1/2 sacks.

== Professional career ==
Mataele was selected in the eighth round (197th overall) of the 1987 NFL draft by the Tampa Bay Buccaneers. He signed his first contract on July 19, but was released on August 12. When the National Football League Players Association went on strike, Mataele was signed as a replacement player by the Green Bay Packers to play nose tackle. He appeared in two strike games, against the Detroit Lions and Philadelphia Eagles as a backup, before being released at the end of the strike. He returned to the Packers in April 1988, but left the team in July 1988, ending his professional career.

== Personal life ==
Mataele has five children.
