= Shinohara =

Shinohara (written: 篠原 lit. "bamboo-grass plain") is a Japanese surname. Notable people with the surname include:

- Chie Shinohara, Japanese manga artist
- Daisaku Shinohara (篠原 大作; 1933–2016), Japanese actor and voice actor
- Emi Shinohara (born 1963), Japanese voice actor
- Futoshi Shinohara (born 1962), Japanese male marathon runner
- Hiromichi Shinohara (1913–1939), fighter ace of the Imperial Japanese Army Air Service
- Kazuo Shinohara (1925–2006), Japanese architect
- Kyoji Shinohara (篠原 恭二; born 1949), Japanese boxer
- Luis Shinohara (born 1954), Brazilian judoka
- Makoto Shinohara (1931–2024), Japanese composer
- Masato Shinohara, technician involved in the 1999 Tokaimura nuclear accident.
- Ryoko Shinohara (born 1973), Japanese singer and actress
- Shinichi Shinohara (born 1973), Japanese judoka
- Takashi Shinohara (born 1948), Japanese politician
- Tetsuo Shinohara (born 1962), Japanese film director
- Tomoe Shinohara (born 1979), Japanese singer, actress, fashion designer, producer and artist
- Tōru Shinohara (born 1936), Japanese manga artist
- Ushio Shinohara (born 1932), Japanese Neo-Dadaist artist
- Yasunoshin Shinohara (1828–1911), Japanese samurai
- Yugo Shinohara (篠原 祐剛; born 1978), Japanese speed skater
- Elena Shinohara (born April 6, 2000), Japanese-born American rhythmic gymnast and social media personality

== See also ==
- Battle of Shinohara
- Shinohara Station (Shiga)
- Shinohara Station (Kōchi)
