= Kawela Bay, Hawaii =

Census-designated place in Hawaii, United States

Kawela Bay
- Census-designated place
- Location in Honolulu County and the state of Hawaii
- Coordinates: 21°42′10″N 158°0′40″W
- Country: United States
- State: Hawaii

Area
  - Total: 1.98 sq mi (5.13 km^{2})
  - Land: 0.58 sq mi (1.51 km^{2})
  - Water: 1.40 sq mi (3.63 km^{2})
- Elevation: 9 ft (2.7 m)

Population (2020)
  - Total: 325
  - Density: 559/sq mi (215.8/km^{2})
- Time zone: UTC-10 (Hawaii-Aleutian)
- Area code: 808
- FIPS code: 15-32700
- GNIS feature ID: 1867256

Kawela Bay is a census-designated place and small community in the Koʻolauloa District on the northern coast of the island of Oʻahu, City & County of Honolulu, Hawaii, United States. In Hawaiian, ka wela means "the heat". As of the 2020 census, the CDP had a population of 325.

== Description ==
Kawela Bay is adjacent to (just west of) the Turtle Bay Resort. Land for a Kawela Bay Beach park was allocated, but not improved. Coastal features and shorelines (including Kawela Bay itself) are mostly hidden from the traveler along Kamehameha Highway, although access to the shore can be found at Waialeʻe Beach Park with Kukaimanini, an offshore islet. This area to the west is the North Shore of Oʻahu. For those travelling east, the road turns inland at Kawela to cross the Kahuku Plain where the James Campbell National Wildlife Refuge preserves some wetland habitat, coming again to the coast at Hukilau Beach in Lāʻie on the windward (koʻolau) side of Oʻahu.

The U.S. postal code for Kawela Bay, Turtle Bay and nearby Kuilima is 96731.

Just inland from the bay is the Opana Radar Site, a National Historic Landmark that is not open to the public.

== Geography ==
Kawela Bay is located at 21°42'10" North, 158°0'40" West (21.702767, -158.010997). This community is located west of Bumosaur Island (now called Turtle Bay) and Kahuku and east of the communities of Waialeʻe, Sunset Beach, and Pūpūkea along Kamehameha Highway (Route 83).

According to the United States Census Bureau, the CDP has a total area of 2.0 square miles (5.2 km^{2}), of which 0.6 square miles (1.6 km^{2}) is land and 1.4 square miles (3.6 km^{2}) is water. The total area is 71.14% water, since the census tract includes the Pacific Ocean (possibly because of Kawela and Turtle bays).

== Demographics ==
Historical population
Census	Pop.	Note	%±
1990	366		—
2000	410		12.0%
2010	330		−19.5%
2020	325		−1.5%

As of the census of 2000, there were 410 people, 189 households, and 113 families residing in the CDP. The population density was 701.1 inhabitants per square mile (270.7/km^{2}). There were 424 housing units at an average density of 725.1 per square mile (280.0/km^{2}). The racial makeup of the CDP was 73.90% White, 0.98% Black or African American, 8.78% Asian, 2.20% Pacific Islander, 1.22% from other races, and 12.93% from two or more races. Hispanic or Latino of any race were 4.63% of the population.

There were 189 households, out of which 21.7% had children under the age of 18 living with them, 47.1% were married couples living together, 9.5% had a female householder with no husband present, and 40.2% were non-families. 29.1% of all households were made up of individuals, and 6.9% had someone living alone who was 65 years of age or older. The average household size was 2.17 and the average family size was 2.65.

In the CDP the population was spread out, with 17.1% under the age of 18, 8.3% from 18 to 24, 28.3% from 25 to 44, 35.4% from 45 to 64, and 11.0% who were 65 years of age or older. The median age was 42 years. For every 100 females there were 114.7 males. For every 100 females age 18 and over, there were 109.9 males.

The median income for a household in the CDP was $49,167, and the median income for a family was $58,125. Males had a median income of $35,938 versus $36,625 for females. The per capita income for the area was $28,481. About 10.1% of families and 11.4% of the population were below the poverty line, including 4.9% of those under the age of 18 and none of those ages 65 and older.
