= SS Kehuku =

History

United States
- Name: Kehuku (1920–1926); Chiloil (1926–1947)
- Namesake: Kahuku
- Owner: USSB (1920–1926); Chile SS Co Inc; American Tankers of Delaware; War Shipping Administration
- Builder: Bethlehem Shipbuilding Corp., Wilmington
- Yard number: 3471
- Laid down: 3 March 1919
- Launched: 10 April 1920
- Sponsored by: Mrs. A.J. Berris
- Completed: June 1920
- Homeport: Wilmington
- Identification: US Official Number 219919; code letters: LWJF (1920–1933); call sign KUPV (1934–1947)
- Fate: Broken up, 1947

General characteristics
- Type: Design 1031 Tanker ship
- Tonnage: 5,107 GRT (1920–1934); 5,228 GRT (1934–1947); 3,541 NRT (1920–1934); 3,203 NRT (1934–1947); 7,925 DWT
- Length: 391.8 ft (119.4 m) registry length
- Beam: 51.3 ft (15.6 m)
- Draft: 29 ft (8.8 m)
- Depth: 28.8 ft (8.8 m)
- Installed power: 2,600 ihp, 390 Nhp
- Propulsion: Bethlehem Shipbuilding Corp. triple expansion steam engine
- Speed: 11 kn (20 km/h; 13 mph)
- Range: 5,200 nmi (9,600 km; 6,000 mi)
- Capacity: 214,155 gallons
- Crew: 38

SS Kehuku was a Design 1031 tanker ship built for the United States Shipping Board immediately after World War I.

== History ==
She was laid down at yard number 3471 at the Wilmington, Delaware shipyard of the Bethlehem Wilmington Shipyard, one of 6 Design 1031 tankers built by Bethlehem for the United States Shipping Board. An additional 5 ships were built by the Terry Shipbuilding Company of Savannah, Georgia. She was launched on 10 April 1920, completed in June 1920, and named Kehuku. Total cost was $1,947,618. In 1926, she was purchased by Chile SS Co Inc (New York City), and renamed Chiloil. In 1935, she was purchased by American Tankers of Delaware (Wilmington). In 1943–1944, she was returned to the War Shipping Administration. She was broken up in the 2q of 1947 in Mobile, Alabama by Hugget.

== Bibliography ==
- McKellar, Norman L. "Steel Shipbuilding under the U. S. Shipping Board, 1917-1921, Part III, Contract Steel Ships" (PDF). Steel Shipbuilding under the U. S. Shipping Board, 1917-1921. ShipScribe.
- Marine Review (1920). "1920 Construction Record of U.S. Yards". The Marine Review. 50 (February). New York: 98.
- Fifty Second Annual List of Merchant Vessels of the United States, Year ended June 30, 1923. Washington, D.C.: Department of Commerce, Bureau of Navigation. 1923.
