= Palauni Ma Sun =

American Samoan football player (born 1985)

No. 77
- Position: Offensive tackle

Personal information
- Born: December 21, 1985 (age 40); Pago Pago, American Samoa
- Listed height: 6 ft 5 in (1.96 m)
- Listed weight: 320 lb (145 kg)

Career information
- High school: Kahuku (Kahuku, Hawaii, U.S.)
- College: Oregon
- NFL draft: 2007: undrafted

Career history
- Washington Redskins (2007)*; Boise Burn (2009); Chicago Rush (2010); Spokane Shock (2011–2014)
- * Offseason or practice squad member only

Career AFL statistics
- Receptions: 11
- Yards: 76
- Touchdowns: 4
- Tackles: 2
- Stats at ArenaFan.com

Palauni M. Ma Sun Jr. (born December 21, 1985) is a former American football offensive lineman.

== Early life ==
Ma Sun was born in Pago Pago, American Samoa and graduated from Kahuku High & Intermediate School of Kahuku, Hawaii in 2003. Ma Sun then attended Fresno City College in Fresno, California and graduated in 2005 with an associate degree in political science. SuperPrep magazine ranked Ma Sun as among the top ten junior college offensive linemen. In 2005, Ma Sun enrolled at the University of Oregon and played two years on the Oregon Ducks football team.

College recruiting
Name	Hometown	School	Height	Weight	Commit date
Palauni Ma Sun; OG	Laie, Hawaii	Fresno City CC	6 ft 6 in (1.98 m)	333 lb (151 kg)	Jan 23, 2005
Palauni Ma Sun; OG	Recruit ratings: Scout: Rivals:				
Overall recruit ranking: Scout: 30 (college recruiting) Rivals: 28 (college recruiting)
Note: In many cases, Scout, Rivals, 247Sports, On3, and ESPN may conflict in their listings of height and weight.; In these cases, the average was taken. ESPN grades are on a 100-point scale.; Sources: "2005 Oregon Football Commitment List". Rivals.; "2005 Oregon College Football Team Recruiting Prospects". Scout.; "Scout.com Team Recruiting Rankings". Scout.; "2005 Team Ranking". Rivals.com.

== Pro career ==
Pre-draft measurables
Height	Weight	40-yard dash	10-yard split	20-yard split	20-yard shuttle	Three-cone drill	Vertical jump	Broad jump	Bench press
6 ft 5 in (1.96 m)	319 lb (145 kg)	5.86 s	1.96 s	3.34 s	5.01 s	8.72 s	24 1/2 in (0.62 m)	7 ft 7 in (2.31 m)	22 reps
Values were taken from the NFL Scouting Combine.

Ma Sun signed a free agent contract with the National Football League Washington Redskins in May 2007. He later played arena football with the Spokane Shock and the Chicago Rush.
