= The Ritz-Carlton Oʻahu, Turtle Bay =

Resort in the Koolauloa District on the northern coast of the island of Oahu in Hawaii

The Ritz-Carlton O‘ahu, Turtle Bay
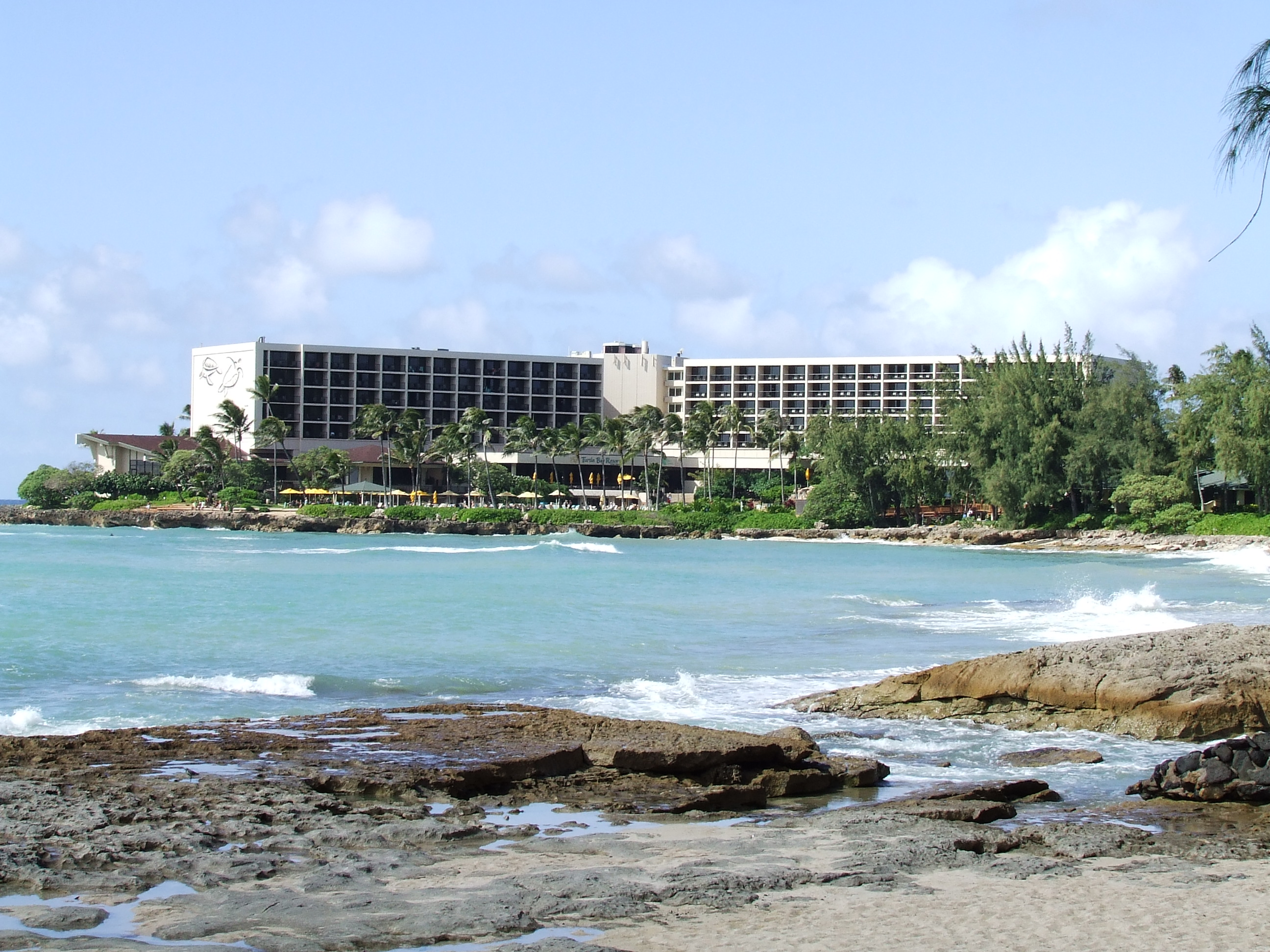
- Interactive map of the The Ritz-Carlton O‘ahu, Turtle Bay area
- Hotel chain: The Ritz-Carlton Hotel Company

General information
- Location: Kahuku, Hawaii, 57-091 Kamehameha Highway
- Coordinates: 21.7052°N 157.9986°W
- Opening: May 1972
- Owner: Host Hotels & Resorts
- Operator: Marriott International

Design and construction
- Architect: Martin Stern Jr.
- Developer: Del E. Webb Construction Company

Other information
- Number of rooms: 410

Website
- Official website

The Ritz-Carlton O‘ahu, Turtle Bay, formerly the Turtle Bay Resort, is a luxury resort with cottages on the North Shore of Oahu island in Hawaii.

== Description ==
View of resort from helicopter

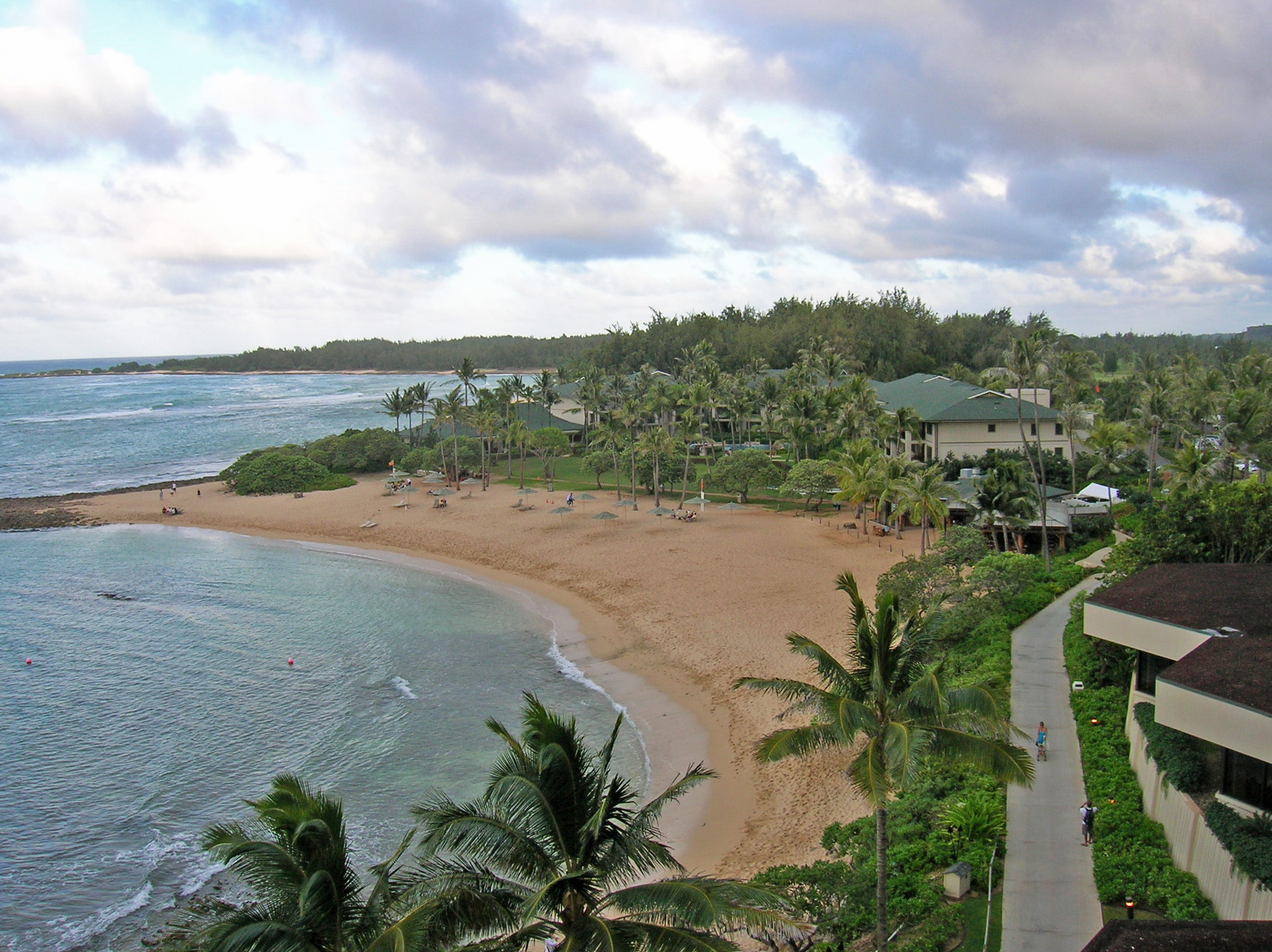
View from room 501

The resort is about a 50-minute drive from Honolulu, between Kahuku, Hawaii to the east and Kawela Bay, Hawaii to the west. The resort owns 858 acres (3.47 km2) of land with five miles of ocean front at Turtle Bay, and features 410 hotel rooms and suites, including the Premier Rooms on the 6th Floor; 42 Beach Cottages that were refreshed in 2015; and manages numerous Ocean Villas, which are larger 2-BR to 4-BR units. The hotel recently unveiled a $45 million resort-wide, eco-sensitive renovation enhancing food and beverage operations, event staging and guest experiences. The hotel was built with three wings on a small peninsula which provides every room with an ocean view. The resort has a variety of restaurants, including Surfer The Bar, a partnership with Surfer Magazine, and The Point Sunset and Pool Bar. The resort also features The Guide Post, a new concept on the traditional hotel concierge, but more interactive and a key component of the Turtle Bay's positioning as an experiential resort. Turtle Bay Resort sits just north of the Kuilima Estates condominium complexes along both of its golf courses, at 21°42′19″N 157°59′55″W.

== History ==
The hotel opened in May 1972 as Del Webb's Kuilima Resort Hotel & Country Club. In the Hawaiian language kui lima means "joining hands". It was built by casino developer Del Webb (1899–1974) to be the first casino on the island; a gaming initiative was on the ballot in the mid-1970s but it did not pass. Hyatt Hotels later took over the property and it operated first as the Kuilima Hyatt Resort Hotel and later as the Hyatt Kuilima Resort until August 1983 when Hilton Hotels & Resorts assumed management, and the hotel was renamed Turtle Bay Hilton and Country Club. Hilton ceased managing the property on August 31, 2001, and the hotel became the Turtle Bay Golf and Tennis Resort.

A potential development deal with Starwood fell through in July 2007. Although much expansion had been approved in 1985, local opposition had developed against the plans. Governor Linda Lingle suggested the state buy the property in 2008. The Trust for Public Land also tried to raise funds for the preservation effort. Two offers were made by the state in August and November 2008 that would have included surrounding open space, but they were not accepted.

After a threat of foreclosure of investor Oaktree Capital Management from Credit Suisse, a new consortium of investors took over the resort in February 2010. As of 2010 it was managed and operated by Benchmark Hospitality International. In December 2013, the management of the resort was split between Replay Resorts, based in Vancouver, British Columbia and Benchmark Hospitality International. After four years of court battles, the Hawaii Supreme Court ruled in July 2010 that a Supplemental Environmental Impact Statement must be filed for new development.

The Blackstone Group bought the hotel, golf courses and surrounding land from the lender consortium in 2017. The hotel ceased operations in 2020 during the COVID-19 pandemic and reopened in July 2021 while renovation continued.

In May 2024, it was announced that the Turtle Bay Resort had been acquired by Host Hotels & Resorts, Inc., the nation's largest lodging real estate investment trust. The property was rebranded as The Ritz-Carlton O‘ahu, Turtle Bay on July 31, 2024.
