= Kahuku High & Intermediate School =

Kahuku High and Intermediate School
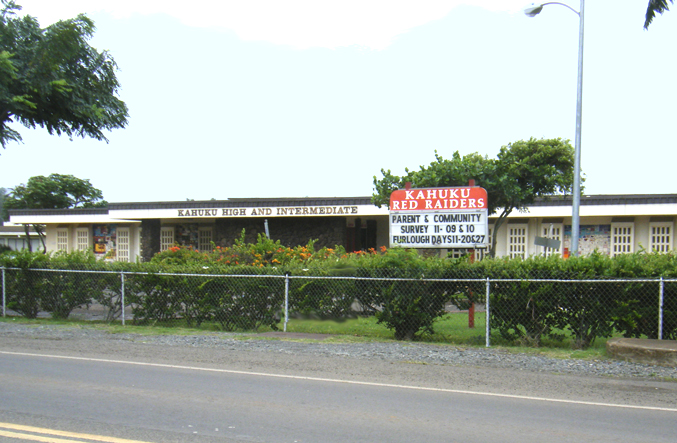

Location
- 56-490 Kamehameha Highway; Kahuku, Hawaii 96731; United States

Information
- Type: Public, co-educational
- Motto: "Learning Today for Lifelong Success in College, Career, and Community!"
- Established: 1897
- School district: Windward District
- Principal: Walter Santiago
- Teaching staff: 95.00 (FTE)
- Grades: 7–12
- Enrollment: 1,414 (2023–2024)
- Student to teacher ratio: 14.88
- Campus: Rural
- Colors: Red and white
- Athletics: Oahu Interscholastic Association
- Mascot: Red Raider
- Rival: Farrington High School; St. Louis School; Waianae High School
- Accreditation: Western Association of Schools and Colleges
- Yearbook: Ke Ko'olau
- Affiliation: WASC
- Military: United States Army JROTC
- Website: http://kahukuhigh.org

Kahuku High & Intermediate School, located in Kahuku CDP, City and County of Honolulu, Hawaii, United States, on the island of Oahu, serves approximately 1,850 students in grades seven through twelve and is part of the Windward District on the island of Oahu. It is a part of the Hawaii Department of Education. The students of Kahuku are enrolled from the communities of Kaʻaʻawa, Hau'ula, La'ie, Kahuku, and Sunset Beach which span a twenty-six mile stretch along the North Shore.

Known as the "Pride of the North Shore," Kahuku High and Intermediate has academic and athletic programs and a Music Learning Center that features band and choral music which have garnered state and national recognition. Their graduation ceremonies are known for their medley performances, even going viral in 2015. The school's We the People team has advanced to the national competition several times.

The campus has a bronze sculpture, Spirit of Kahuku, by Jan Gordon Fisher and Bruce Brown.

== Kahuku High School Red Raiders football program ==
The Red Raiders have won or shared the Oahu Interscholastic Association (OIA) public school football championship title 29 times since the inception of the OIA in 1940. Kahuku High School's football team also has been nationally ranked multiple times in numerous high school football opinion polls and rankings even before winning their first Hawai`i High School Athletic Association (HHSAA) State Football Championship in 2000. Kahuku High School football program's highest ranking came at the end of the 2001 football season when they were ranked #8 in the Super 25 High School Football rankings and #13 in the StudentSports.com rankings.

In the 21st century the Kahuku Red Raiders have won a Hawai`i record eleven (11) State Football Championships - most recently in November 2023, beating fellow public school Mililani 21–19. In Kahuku High School football history, four (4) head football coaches have won state football championship titles: Siuaki Livai (2000, 2001, 2003, 2005), Reginald "Reggie" Torres (2006, 2011, 2012), Vavae Tata (2015), and most recently Sterling Carvahlo (2021, 2022, 2023).

With the rare defensive shutout in the championship game, the 2022 Red Raiders earned back-to-back state football champions for the first time since 2011–2012. Sterling Carvalho joins former Red Raider alumni and previous Kahuku head football coaches Reggie Torres and Siuaki Livai as the only coaches to lead Kahuku to a state football championship in consecutive seasons. Additionally, the Kahuku Red Raiders have won all four state-final meetings against Punahou School and its 31 victories in the state HHSAA tournament are a record in the high school sport of American football in Hawai`i.

== Notable alumni ==
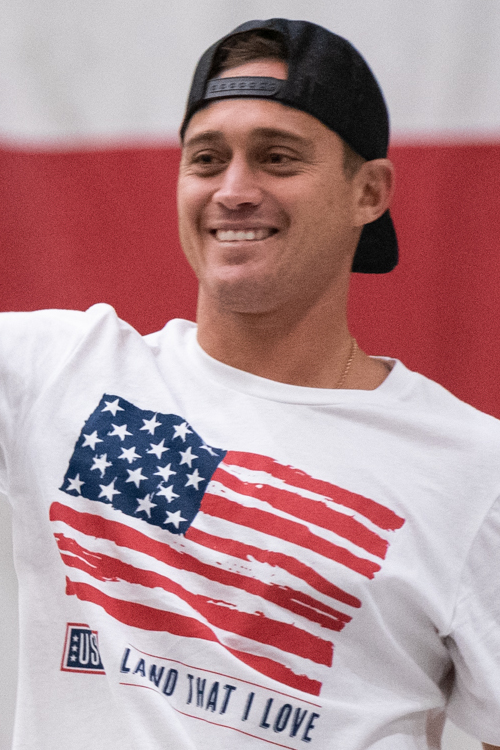
Makua Rothman, world champion surfer

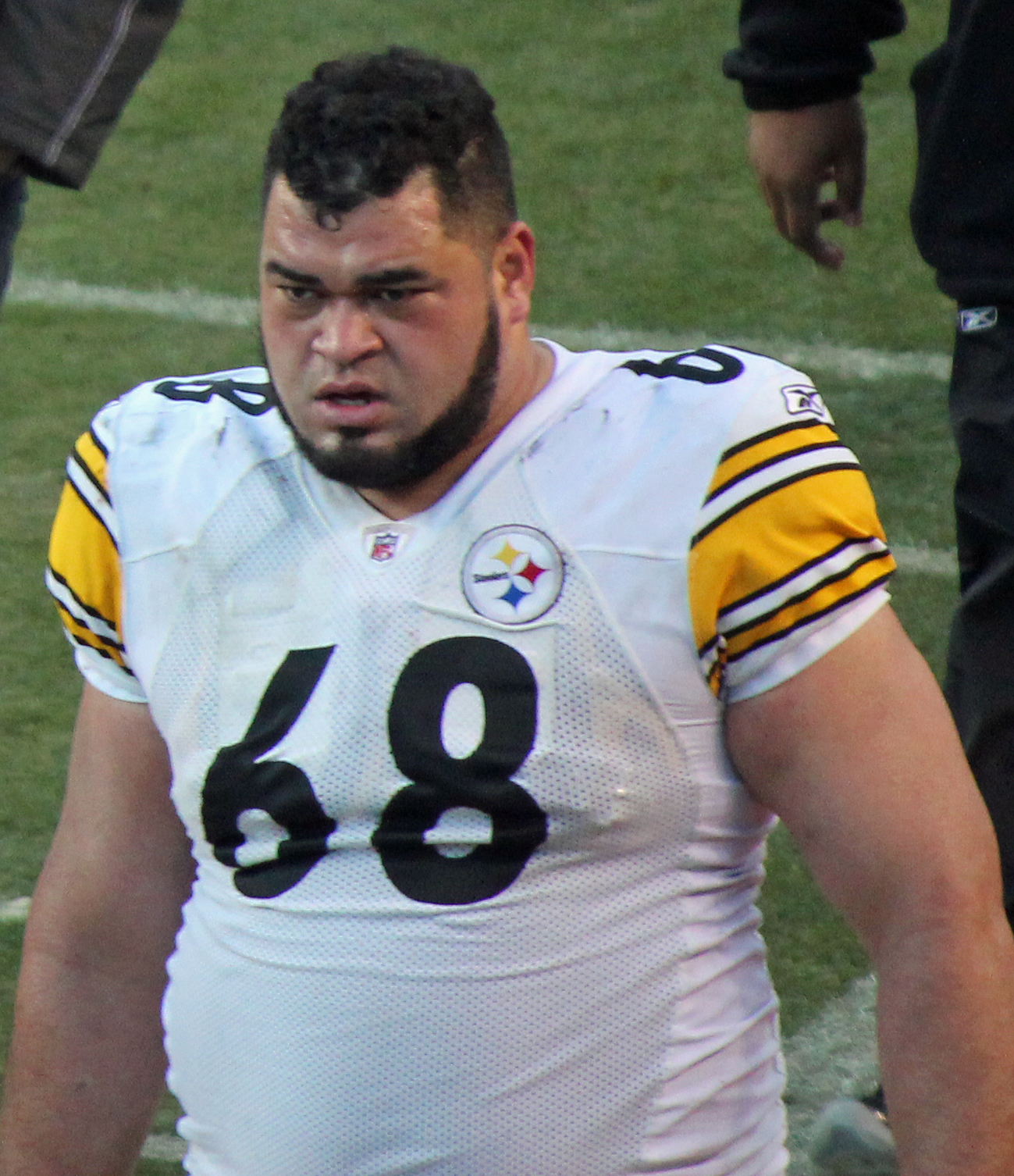
Chris Kemoeatu

Listed alphabetically by last name (year of graduation):

- Dr. Robert Anae, Offensive Coordinator at Syracuse University
- Earl I. Anzai, former Attorney General of Hawaii
- Brenton Awa, Hawaii state senator and former news anchor
- Alexander Bonde, German politician
- Ry Bradley, country singer
- Sam Choy, chef and television personality
- Eni F.H. Faleomavaega, U.S. congressman
- Salu Hunkin-Finau, educator and politician
- Jack Johnson (1993), singer/songwriter
- Natasha Kai, 2008 Olympian for the United States Gold medal-winning Women's National Soccer Team
- Liona Lefau (2023), college football linebacker for the Texas Longhorns
- Alapati Albert "Al" Lolotai, first football player of Samoan ancestry and First Polynesian football player ever to play professional American football in the National Football League NFL in 1945.
- Leo Reed, labor leader and he was the first Kahuku High School Graduate to play professional football.
- Tanoai Reed, Actor and Hollywood stunt man - primarily for Dwayne "The Rock" Johnson
- Keala Settle (1993), Broadway and motion picture actress and singer
- Taylor Wily, actor, Hawaii Five-0 (2010 TV series)

=== Professional surfers ===
- John John Florence, world champion surfer
- Jamie O'Brien, surfer and film producer
- Tamayo Perry (1993), professional surfer and actor
- Makua Rothman, world champion surfer

=== Professional football players ===
==== National Football League ====
- Al Afalava (2005), Chicago Bears, Indianapolis Colts, and Tennessee Titans
- Bradlee Anae (2016), Dallas Cowboys and New York Jets
- Toniu Fonoti (1999), San Diego Chargers, Minnesota Vikings, and Jacksonville Jaguars
- Aaron Francisco, Indianapolis Colts, Carolina Panthers, and Arizona Cardinals
- Alohi Gilman (2015), San Diego/LA Chargers
- Lakei Heimuli, Chicago Bears
- Chris Kemoe`atu, Pittsburgh Steelers
- Ma'ake Kemoe`atu, Washington Redskins, Carolina Panthers, and Baltimore Ravens
- Hau'oli Kikaha (2010), New Orleans Saints and XFL's Dallas Renegades
- Alapati Albert "Al" Lolotai, Washington Redskins and Los Angeles Dons
- Timote "Tim" Manoa, Cleveland Browns and Indianapolis Colts
- Stan Mataele, Tampa Bay Buccaneers and Green Bay Packers
- Itula Mili, Seattle Seahawks
- Chris Naeole, New Orleans Saints and Jacksonville Jaguars
- Leo Reed, drafted by the Saint Louis Cardinals, Played for the Houston Oilers and Denver Broncos of the NFL; later played for the Indianapolis Warriors of the United Football League, and the Toronto Argonauts of the CFL.
- Uani Devin 'Unga (2006), New York Giants

==== National Football League invitees ====
Former Kahuku Football players who were invited to NFL training camps or on NFL practice squads.

- Palauni Ma Sun, Washington Redskins practice squad and Arena Football League's Chicago Rush and Spokane Shock
- Tevita Ofahengaue, 2001 NFL's Mr. "Irrelevant", Arizona Cardinals and Jacksonville Jaguar
- Kona Schwenke, Kansas City Chiefs, New England Patriots, New York Jets, Oakland Raiders, Seattle Seahawks

==== Other football leagues ====
Former Kahuku HS football players who played in other professional North American football leagues.

- Harland Ah You, Canadian Football League's (CFL) Calgary Stampeders
- Miki "Junior" Ah You, Hawai`i Sports Hall of Fame, Canadian Football Hall of Fame. CFL's Montreal Alouettes, USFL's Chicago Blitz, USFL's New Orleans Breakers, and USFL's Arizona Outlaws
- Brad Anae, United States Football League's (USFL) Philadelphia Stars, USFL's Houston Gamblers, and the USFL's San Antonio Gunslingers
- Robert Anae, (Drafted by the USFL's New Jersey Generals in 1985, the last year of the USFL before it shut down.)
