= James Campbell National Wildlife Refuge =

National Wildlife Refuge on the island of Oʻahu, Hawaii, U.S.

- IUCN category IV (habitat/species management area)
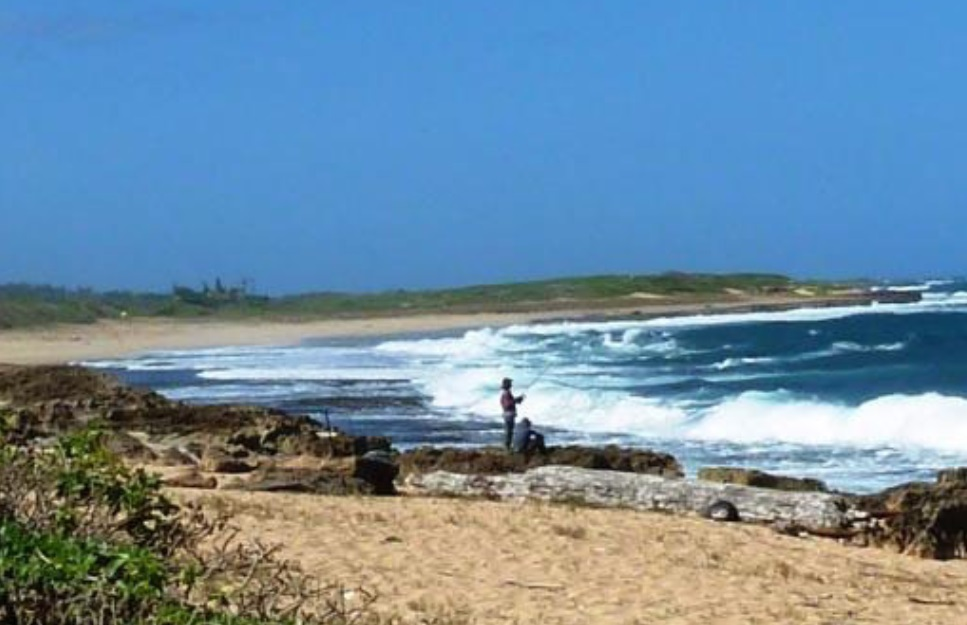

- Location within Hawaii
- Location: Oʻahu, Hawaii, United States
- Nearest city: Kahuku, Hawaii
- Coordinates: 21°41′24″N 157°57′20″W
- Area: 1,100 acres (4.5 km^{2})
- Established: 1976
- Governing body: U.S. Fish and Wildlife Service
- Website: James Campbell National Wildlife Refuge

James Campbell National Wildlife Refuge is a National Wildlife Refuge on the island of Oʻahu, Hawaii. It was established in 1976 to permanently protect an ecologically intact unit and to provide habitat for native and migratory fauna and native flora. It established critical habitat for Hawaii's four endangered waterbirds, the ʻalae kea (Hawaiian coot, Fulica alai), koloa maoli (Hawaiian duck, Anas wyvilliana), ʻalae ʻula (Hawaiian gallinule, Gallinula chloropus sandvicensis), and āeʻo (Hawaiian stilt, Himantopus mexicanus knudseni) and many migratory seabirds, endangered and native plant species, and the endangered Hawaiian monk seal and green sea turtle. It also provides increased wildlife-dependent public uses and flood control within the refuge and the local community.

== Location ==
James Campbell National Wildlife Refuge lies at the northernmost tip of the Hawaiian island of Oʻahu, between the town of Kahuku to the east and Turtle Bay to the west. It serves as a strategic landfall for migratory birds coming from as far away as Alaska, New Zealand, and Asia. The refuge is divided into two units, Punamano and Kiʻi. The Punamano Unit, at 21°41′49″N 157°58′18″W, is a natural spring-fed pond, while the Kiʻi Unit, at 21°41′24″N 157°57′20″W, is a remnant marsh that has been drastically modified by agriculture. Wetland habitat is maintained at the Kiʻi Unit by pumping water into seven impoundments. Both units are near the coastline and the topography is nearly flat.

Historically, the Kiʻi Unit functioned as the freshwater settling basins for the Kahuku Sugar Mill.

== Wildlife and habitat ==
The refuge is one of the few scattered remnants of wetland habitats that still exist on Oʻahu and is one of the most productive waterbird wetlands for resident and migratory species such as the kioea (bristle-thighed curlew, Numenius tahitiensis) and ʻakekeke (ruddy turnstone, Arenaria interpres). A total of 119 bird species have been documented on the refuge since its inception. Unusual vagrant birds include the northern harrier, peregrine falcon, black-tailed godwit, Hudsonian godwit, curlew sandpiper, solitary sandpiper, and snowy egret. There are no native mammals, reptiles, or amphibians.

Threats to wetland birds at the refuge include nonnative and invasive plants and animals and outbreaks of avian botulism. Predation by free-ranging dogs, feral cats, rats, the nonnative American bullfrog, and the small Asian mongoose threatens birds and their nests. These predators are controlled on the refuge to protect the birds. Populations of the koloa are affected by hybridization with Mallards. Exotic plants such as para grass (Urochloa mutica) and marsh fleabanes (Pluchea spp.) can degrade habitat quality by invading wetlands and competing with local flora. Such plants are controlled with prescribed burning, water level fluctuation, and mechanical clearing.

== Land status ==
At inception, the refuge was managed under a 55-year lease from the Estate of James Campbell. In 2005, the United States Fish and Wildlife Service purchased 222 acres (90 ha) in fee simple and 38 acres (15 ha) of conservation easements, including the two existing units.

Because the Estate of James Campbell intended to sell large parcels in the Kahuku area by 2007, including lands surrounding the two refuge units, the Hawaii congressional delegation with support from state and city agencies and the local community introduced two bills to expand the refuge to a total of 1,100 acres (450 ha).

Congress and the president supported the bill and on May 25, 2006, enacted the James Campbell National Wildlife Refuge Expansion Act of 2005.

== Public use ==
Due to the sensitivity of the habitat and its small acreage, the refuge is closed to the general public. However, guided tours are offered on a limited basis twice a week and for special events and education outside the nesting season, generally between October and February.
