= Chris Kemoeatu =

Tongan gridiron football player (born 1983)

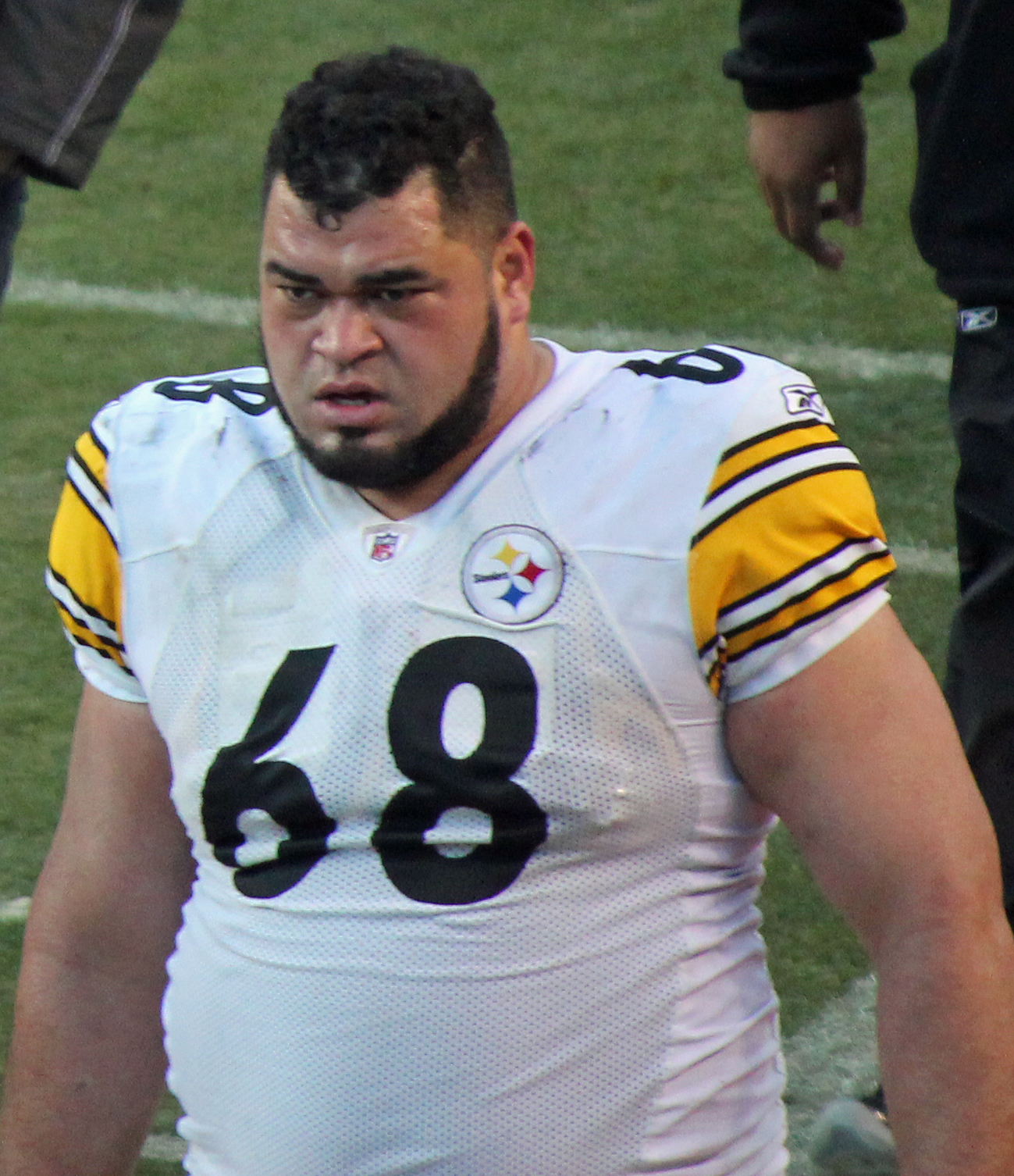
- Kemoeatu with the Pittsburgh Steelers in 2012

No. 68
- Position: Offensive guard

Personal information
- Born: January 4, 1983 (age 43); Kahuku, Hawaii, U.S.
- Listed height: 6 ft 3 in (1.91 m)
- Listed weight: 344 lb (156 kg)

Career information
- High school: Kahuku
- College: Utah
- NFL draft: 2005: 6th round, 204th overall pick

Career history
- Pittsburgh Steelers (2005–2011)

Awards and highlights
- 2× Super Bowl champion (XL, XLIII); First-team All-American (2004); First-team All-MW (2004)

Career NFL statistics
- Games played: 75
- Games started: 53
- Fumble recoveries: 3
- Stats at Pro Football Reference

Uikelotu Christopher Kemoeatu (pronounced [kemo.e.ˈatu]; born January 4, 1983) is an American former professional football player who was a guard for the Pittsburgh Steelers of the National Football League (NFL). He played college football for the Utah Utes, and was selected by the Steelers in the sixth round of the 2005 NFL draft. He is the younger brother of former NFL nose tackle Ma'ake Kemoeatu.

On December 4, 2024, Kemoeatu was inducted into the Polynesian Football Hall of Fame.

== Early life ==
Kemoeatu was born in Kahuku, Hawaii. He is the younger brother of Ma'ake Kemoeatu, who also played football for the University of Utah and later entered the NFL. When Kemoeatu was three years old, the family moved to Hawaii.

Kemoeatu grew up in Kahuku, Hawaii, in northern O'ahu. He attended Kahuku High School, where he played for the school's football team. He helped lead the school to their first state championship, and was named the 2000 Hawaii High School Defensive Player of the Year. Also selected first-team all state and all league (OIA) as a defensive lineman. As a junior was selected honorable mention all state defensive lineman. Kemoeatu played on both sides of the ball in high school before playing offensive line at Utah.

== College career ==
Kemoeatu enrolled at the University of Utah, where he played for the Utah Utes football team. Originally recruited as a defensive lineman, he was moved to offensive guard by coach Ron McBride. In 2004, his senior year, Kemoeatu was named All-American. He majored in sociology.

== Professional career ==
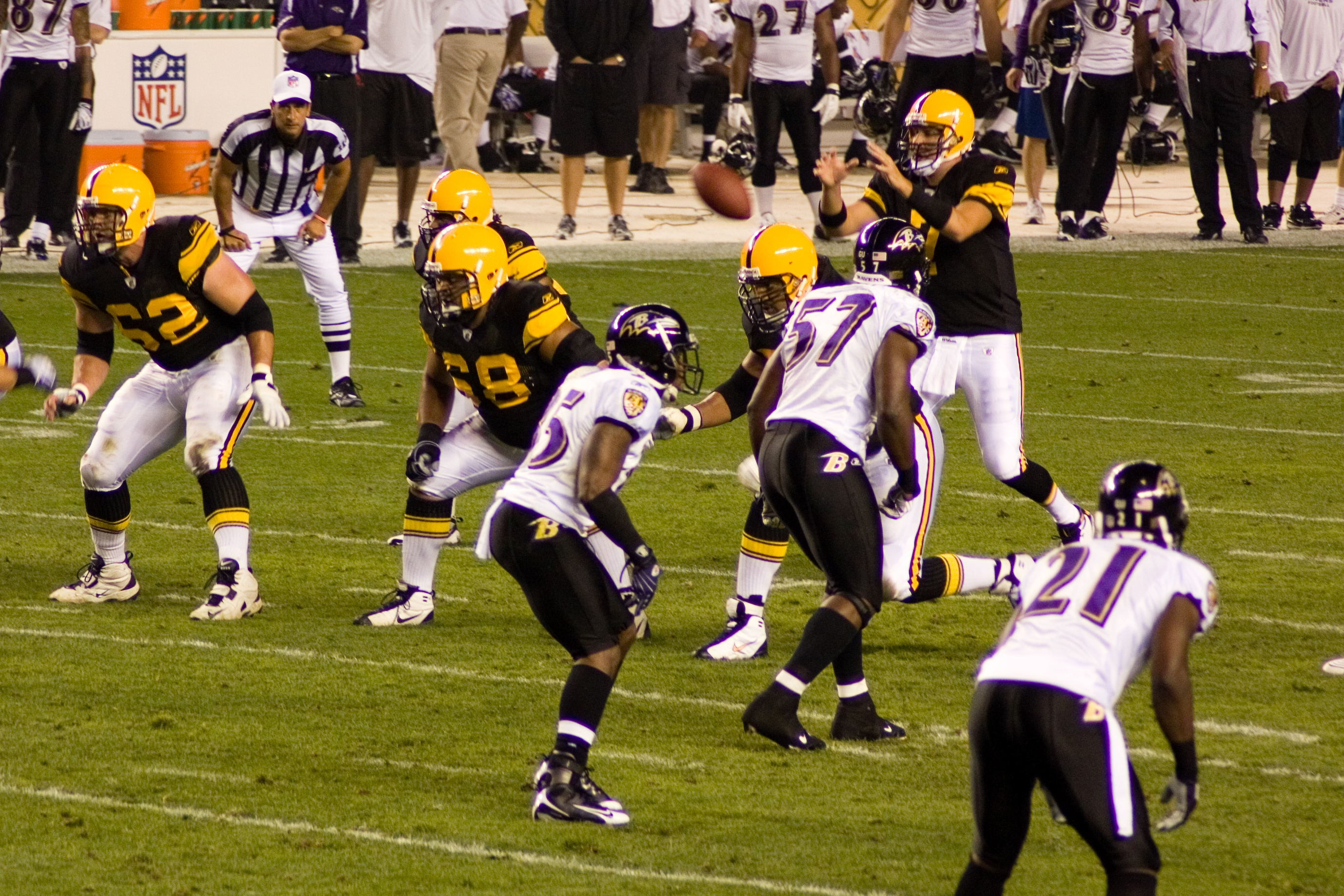
Kemoeatu (68) playing against the Baltimore Ravens in 2008.

Kemoeatu was selected by the Pittsburgh Steelers in the sixth round (204th overall) in the 2005 NFL draft. In his rookie season, he was inactive for 15 games and did not get any playing time. The following year, he made his first two starts of his career. He played 16 games throughout the 2007 season. He began the 2008 Steelers training camp on the physically unable to perform list, but began practicing in the second week.

In 2008, Kemoeatu replaced seven time Pro Bowler Alan Faneca on the Steelers' offensive line, after Faneca signed with the New York Jets in the said offseason.

After the Steelers won Super Bowl XLIII, they re-signed Kemoeatu to a five-year contract.

At the end of the 2010 season, Kemoeatu and the Steelers appeared in Super Bowl XLV. He was a starter in the 31–25 loss to the Green Bay Packers.

He was released on March 3, 2012.

== Personal life ==
Kemoeatu is the son of Manako Melino and Ahea Kolovetekina Kemoeatu, and has six siblings. His elder brothers Ma'ake and Tevita also attended Utah, playing defensive line. His younger brother, Benji, signed to play guard for the West Virginia University Mountaineers but didn't actually attend.

On August 27, 2014, Chris received a kidney transplant from his brother, Ma'ake.

== Honours ==
National honours

- Order of Queen Sālote Tupou III, Member (31 July 2008).
