= Turtle Bay, Oʻahu =

Bay on Oahu, Hawaii, United States

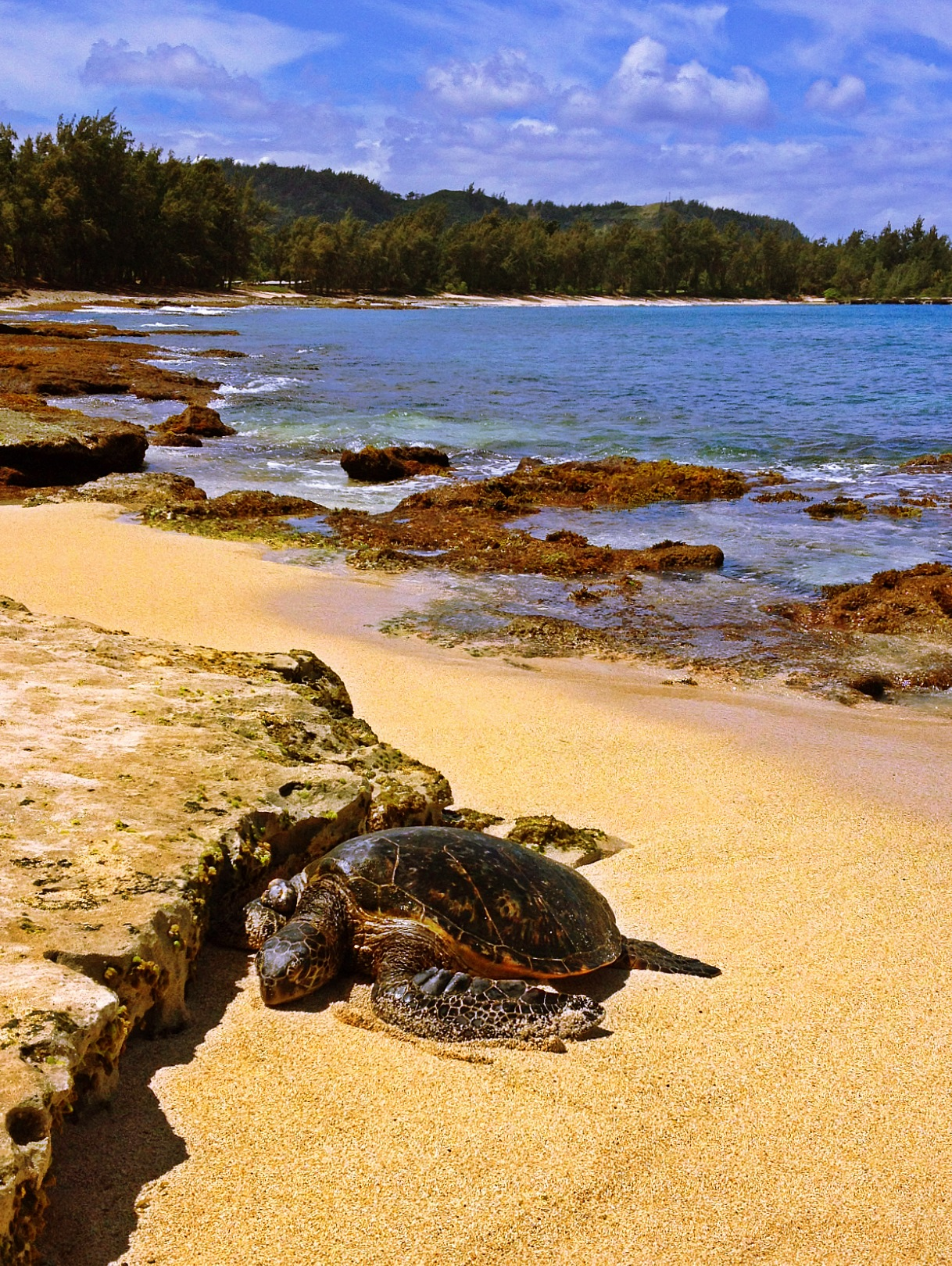
Turtle Bay, Oʻahu

Turtle Bay is located between Protection Point and Kuilima Point on the North Shore of the island of Oʻahu in the U.S. State of Hawaii.

Green sea turtles were known to feed in the bay, so residents renamed the area "Turtle Bay". This name predates the completion of the former Kuilima Resort Hotel and Country Club in May 1972, although it is not the bay's original name. The Bay is currently home to the famous Turtle Bay Resort, which includes hotels, cottages and a golf course. The James Campbell National Wildlife Refuge preserves a small pond adjacent to the golf course.

== Geography and environment ==
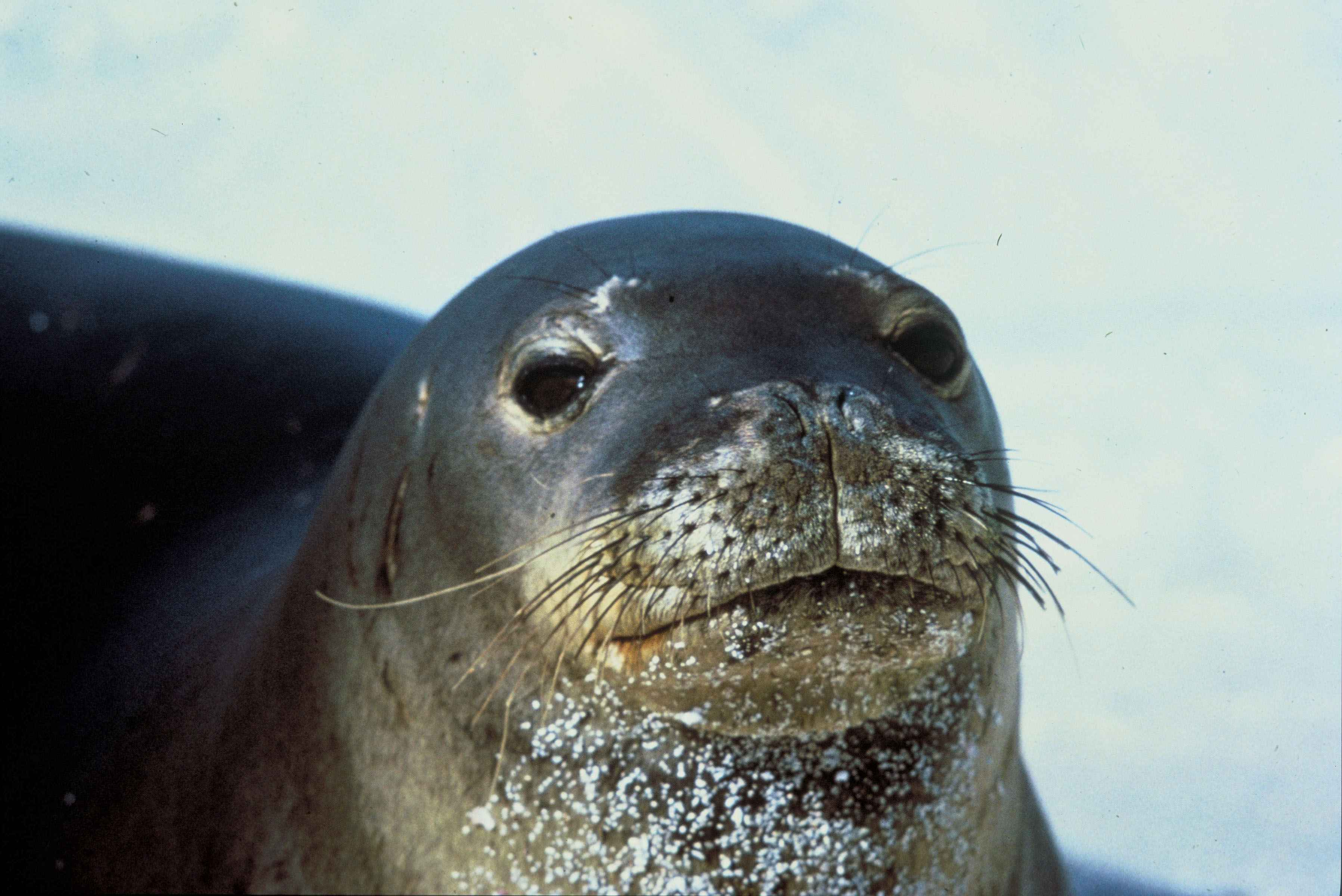
The Hawaiian monk seal is an endangered species, endemic to the Hawaiian Islands.

One of the last undeveloped areas on Oahu, Turtle Bay is recognized for its rock formations, wild coastal beaches, threatened green sea turtles and endangered Hawaiian monk seal habitats, whale spottings, traditional fishing areas, small local agricultural lots and Hawaiian ancestral burial grounds.

The beach is sandy but the swimming conditions are poor because the ocean floor near the shoreline is rocky. There is a large limestone shelf that spans almost the entire length of the bay. The coastal underwater formations are home to one of the most striking limu (algae) found in the Islands. Martensia fragilis grows on rocks in tide pools and on reef flats. This iridescent species ranges from light blue to pink and orange in color.

The bay is surrounded by about 5 miles (8.0 km) of beaches and 12 miles (19 km) of trails.

== Attractions ==
A World War II concrete bunker stands at the tip of the bay's western point. It is located at 21°42′6″N 158°0′6″W, just north of Route 83, which is known as Kamehameha Highway. To the west of the point is Kawela Bay, and to the east, the former site of Kahuku Army Airfield.

The Turtle Bay Resort has the North Shore's sole large hotel. The resort rests on 840 acres (3.4 km^{2}) including the former airfield runways. Other accommodations on the resort include the beach front Villas (built in 2005) and the Kuilima Estates Condos (built in the early 1970s). The resort took the "turtle bay" name officially in 1983. Previously the area was called Kuilima, and the point was Kalaeokaunu. A $45 million deal to preserve nearly 630 acres of open space with the Turtle Bay Resort was finalized in October 2015.

== Sports ==
Located just north of the famed Banzai Pipeline, Turtle Bay is the site of the Rainbows Break surfing spot.

The bay is also one of a number of spots used for kayaking on the North Shore.

Turtle Bay Resort has two championship golf courses, the Arnold Palmer Course and the George Fazio Course.

In October 2015, Turtle Bay hosted "The Stand Up World Series", a professional platform for the world's best stand-up paddle racers to determine the legitimate men's, women's, and under-16 world champions.

== Television and film ==
Turtle Bay is a common area for filming because of its still largely unspoiled landscape, natural environment, and large waves, along with its proximity to Honolulu.

The prologue to the 1974 film Death Wish, depicting Charles Bronson and Hope Lange as a married couple on vacation, was shot in Turtle Bay.

The area was the setting for the 2008 Universal Pictures film, Forgetting Sarah Marshall. Produced by Judd Apatow, filming began in April 2007 at the Turtle Bay Resort.

With its rock formations and constant rolling surf, Turtle Bay served as a backdrop for the ABC TV series, Lost. In addition to outside locations, a World War II-era bunker in the area was used as both an Iraqi Republican Guard installation and a Dharma Initiative research station.

On 25 March 2012, the Discovery Channel's MythBusters TV show episode, "marooned on a desert island" with only duct tape and a few other items, was filmed on location at Turtle Bay.

== See also ==
- Environment of Hawaii
- Tourism in Hawaii
