= Maʻake Kemoeatu =

Tongan gridiron football player (born 1979)

Ma'ake Kemoeatu
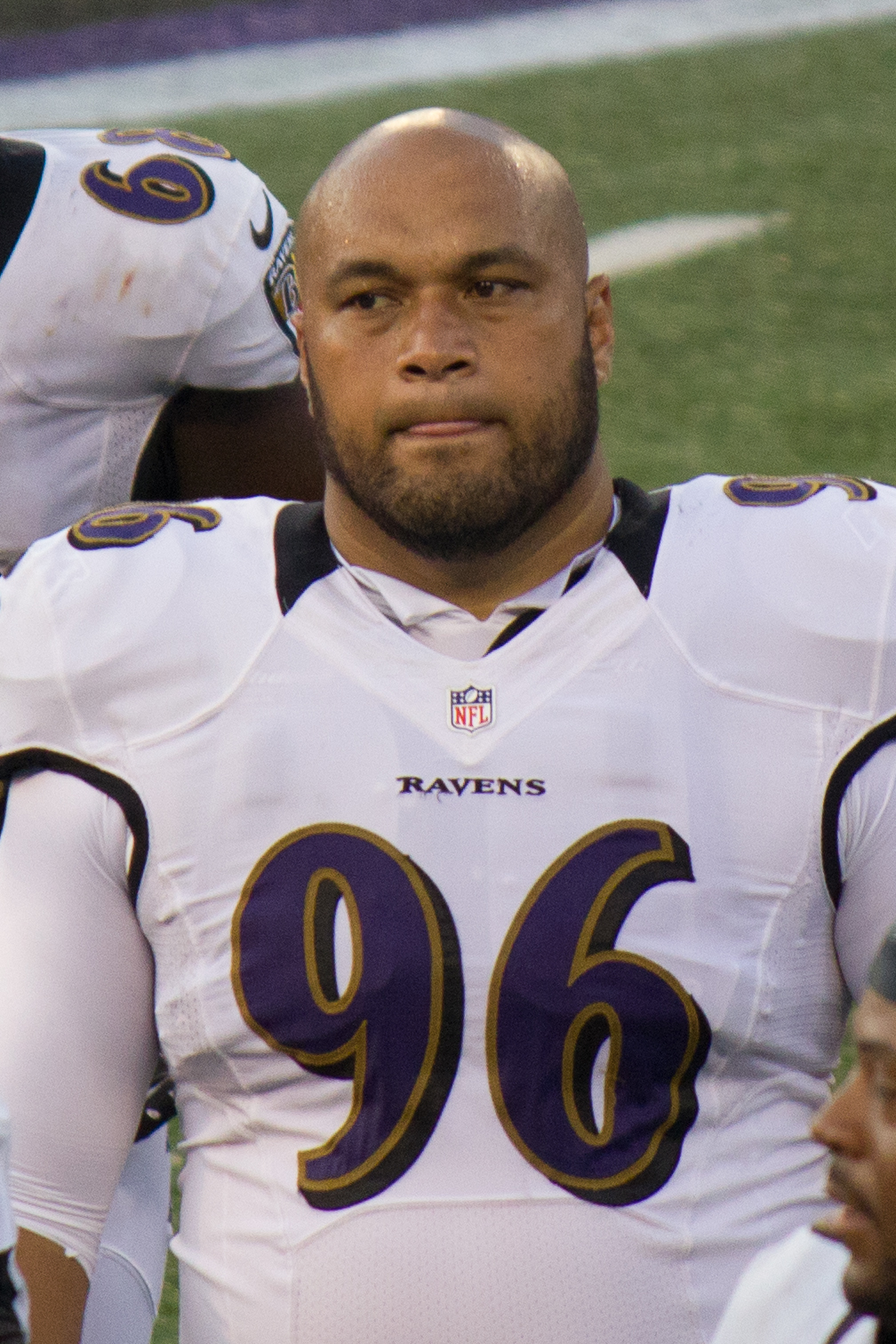
- Kemoeatu with the Baltimore Ravens in 2012

No. 92, 99, 96
- Position: Nose tackle

Personal information
- Born: January 10, 1979 (age 47); Pule'anga Fakatu'i'o, Tonga
- Listed height: 6 ft 5 in (1.96 m)
- Listed weight: 345 lb (156 kg)

Career information
- High school: Kahuku (Kahuku, Hawaii, U.S.)
- College: Utah
- NFL draft: 2002: undrafted

Career history
- Baltimore Ravens (2002–2005); Carolina Panthers (2006–2009); Washington Redskins (2010); Baltimore Ravens (2012)

Awards and highlights
- Super Bowl champion (XLVII)

Career NFL statistics
- Total tackles: 287
- Sacks: 5.0
- Forced fumbles: 2
- Fumble recoveries: 1
- Stats at Pro Football Reference

Ma'ake Tu'amelie Kemoeatu (pronounced [maˈʔake kemoeˈatu]; born January 10, 1979) is a Tongan-American former professional American football player who played as a nose tackle. He was signed by the Ravens as an undrafted free agent in 2002. He played college football for the University of Utah Utes. Kemoeatu has also played for the Carolina Panthers and Washington Redskins. He is the older brother of former NFL offensive lineman Chris Kemoeatu.

== Early life ==
Kemoeatu was born in Tonga. His younger brother is Chris Kemoeatu, who also played football at the University of Utah and later entered the NFL. When he was a child his family moved to the U.S. state of Hawaii. He grew up in Kahuku, Hawaii, on the north shore of Oahu, and attended Kahuku High School.

== College career ==
Kemoeatu was a four-year letterman and three-year starter at Utah. He started 35 of 43 games played in college, finishing his career with 160 tackles and nine sacks. He was suspended by the NCAA for his last college game, the 2001 Las Vegas Bowl, for buying two math books for his younger brother Tevita using scholarship money.

== Professional career ==
=== Baltimore Ravens (first stint) ===
Kemoeatu played four seasons with the Baltimore Ravens from 2002 to 2005. He was originally signed as an undrafted free agent in 2002.

=== Carolina Panthers ===
Kemoeatu signed with the Carolina Panthers as a free agent in 2006.

Kemoeatu suffered a torn right Achilles tendon during the team's 2009 training camp. He was placed on season-ending injured reserve on August 5. Kemoeatu was released by the Panthers on March 5, 2010.

=== Washington Redskins ===
On March 13, 2010, Kemoeatu signed a two-year, $7 million contract with the Washington Redskins. He was released by the Redskins on July 28, 2011.

=== Baltimore Ravens (second stint) ===
On May 2, 2012, Kemoeatu returned to the Baltimore Ravens. After a one-year hiatus from football, he lost 78 pounds, from 415 down to 337, in a serious attempt to resurrect his career, he wound up winning the starting nose tackle job from Terrence Cody, starting 13 games, recording 29 tackles, one sack, and one forced fumble. Kemoeatu also would go on to win his first championship title when the Ravens won Super Bowl XLVII before retiring from football.

== NFL career statistics ==
Legend
**Bold**	Career high

=== Regular season ===
Year	Team	Games		Tackles					Interceptions					Fumbles			
Year	Team	GP	GS	Cmb	Solo	Ast	Sck	TFL	Int	Yds	TD	Lng	PD	FF	FR	Yds	TD
2002	BAL	**16**	1	21	16	5	**2.0**	4	0	0	0	0	0	0	0	0	0
2003	BAL	15	1	23	21	2	1.0	2	0	0	0	0	1	0	0	0	0
2004	BAL	14	3	28	20	8	0.0	0	0	0	0	0	0	0	0	0	0
2005	BAL	**16**	**16**	40	30	10	1.0	3	0	0	0	0	0	0	**1**	0	0
2006	CAR	**16**	13	34	26	8	0.0	2	0	0	0	0	1	0	0	0	0
2007	CAR	**16**	13	**47**	**41**	6	0.0	**5**	0	0	0	0	**3**	0	0	0	0
2008	CAR	14	14	36	31	5	0.0	1	0	0	0	0	2	**1**	0	0	0
2009	CAR	0	0	Did not play due to injury													
2010	WAS	14	12	29	19	10	0.0	1	0	0	0	0	0	0	0	0	0
2012	BAL	15	13	29	15	**14**	1.0	2	0	0	0	0	2	**1**	0	0	0
Career		136	86	287	219	68	5.0	20	0	0	0	0	9	2	1	0	0

=== Playoffs ===
Year	Team	Games		Tackles					Interceptions					Fumbles			
Year	Team	GP	GS	Cmb	Solo	Ast	Sck	TFL	Int	Yds	TD	Lng	PD	FF	FR	Yds	TD
2003	BAL	1	0	0	0	0	0.0	0	0	0	0	0	0	0	0	0	0
2008	CAR	1	1	5	**5**	0	0.0	**1**	0	0	0	0	0	0	0	0	0
2012	BAL	**4**	**4**	**10**	**5**	**5**	0.0	0	0	0	0	0	0	0	0	0	0
Career		6	5	15	10	5	0.0	1	0	0	0	0	0	0	0	0	0

== Personal life ==
He is the older brother of Chris Kemoeatu, who won Super Bowl XL and Super Bowl XLIII as a member of the Pittsburgh Steelers.

On August 27, 2014, Ma'ake donated a kidney to his brother, Chris.

== Honours ==
National honours

- Order of Queen Sālote Tupou III, Member (31 July 2008).
