= Elena Shinohara =

American rhythmic gymnast

- Born: April 6, 2000 (age 26); Saitama, Japan
- Occupations: YouTuber; Rhythmic gymnast; Twitch-streamer
- Years active: 2021–present

Twitch information
- Channel: elenashinohara
- Genre: gaming
- Followers: 13.4 thousand

YouTube information
- Channel: Elena Shinohara
- Years active: 19 years, since 16th of December 2007
- Genre: Rhythmic Gymnastics/Sport
- Subscribers: 2.04 million
- Views: 1.21 billion

Gymnastics career
- Discipline: Rhythmic gymnastics
- Country represented: United States; (2015; 2018–2020)
- Club: Rhythmic Brains
- Head coach: Nancy Shinohara
- Last updated: 18th of July 2026

Elena Shinohara (born 6 April 2000) is a Japanese-born American rhythmic gymnast and social media personality. She was a member of the U.S. National Rhythmic Gymnastics Team, and she posts gymnastics videos on social media, including YouTube and TikTok.

== Personal life ==
Elena Shinohara was born in Japan on April 6, 2000. She moved with her family to the United States when she was five months old. Her mother, Nancy, is a former member of the Japanese national rhythmic gymnastics team, and she coaches Elena. She graduated from Collins Hill High School in 2018. She graduated from Georgia Tech, and she majored in biochemistry. Her father, Minoru, runs the Human Neuromuscular Physiology Laboratory at Georgia Tech.

== Gymnastics career ==
Shinohara was first named to the Junior U.S. National team in 2015.

Shinohara made her international debut at the 2018 Luxembourg Cup. She placed fourth in the ball, fifth in the ribbon, and seventh in the hoop. She also competed at the 2019 Irina Cup in Warsaw, Poland where she finished eighth in clubs. At the 2019 Amsterdam Masters, she won the silver medal in the all-around and the gold medal in the hoop.

At the 2019 National Championships, she finished tenth in the all-around, seventh in clubs and ribbon, and eighth in ball. She was then named to the Senior U.S. National team. She also won the 2019 Sportsperson of the Year Award, which was voted on by the top twelve rhythmic gymnasts at the competition. At the 2020 Rhythmic Challenge in Lake Placid, New York, she finished fifth in the all-around and won the bronze medal in clubs.

== Social media ==
Shinohara posts training and flexibility videos on TikTok. As of February 2026, she has 5.6 million followers on TikTok.

In honor of Asian Pacific American Heritage Month in May 2021, TikTok named her an API TikTok Trailblazer.
