= Collins Hill High School =

Public school in Gwinnett County, Georgia, United States

- Crest - Eagle

Location
- 50 Taylor Road; Suwanee, Georgia 30024; United States; 34°00′59″N 84°01′14″W

Information
- Type: Public School
- Motto: "You can't hide that Eagle pride!"
- Established: 1994
- School district: Gwinnett County Public Schools
- Principal: Lee Augmon
- Teaching staff: 155.30 (FTE)
- Grades: 9–12
- Enrollment: 2,605 (2023–2024)
- Student to teacher ratio: 16.77
- Hours in school day: 07:10 AM - 02:10 PM
- Campus: 70 acres (280,000 m^{2})
- Colors: Green, silver and white, with black as an unofficial accent
- Mascot: Eagle
- Nickname: The Hill
- Website: Official website

Collins Hill High School is a public high school in Gwinnett County, near Suwanee, Georgia, United States. The school is operated by Gwinnett County Public Schools. The only school which feeds into it is Creekland Middle School.

Collins Hill was the biggest high school in Georgia when it first opened in 1994, and has since added 20 acres (81,000 m^{2}). Its student population has grown from its original 1377 to a high of about 4,200, the current count being 3,155.

== Charity ==
Each year, the students volunteer over 27,000 hours toward community service activities, including the Thanksgiving Can-a-Thon, Holiday Hope, and Relay for Life.

Many students participate in community service clubs such as Beta Club, and are active in helping others. Students are offered many volunteer opportunities throughout the year via the school's Volunteer Center. Four scholarships are available to students for volunteering and getting involved.

== Notable alumni ==
- Jared Bartlett, NFL linebacker for the Arizona Cardinals
- Brandon Coutu, former NFL football player
- Tomon Fox, NFL football player
- Deuce Geralds, college football defensive tackle for the LSU Tigers
- Taylor Heinicke, NFL quarterback
- Will Holland, MLB player
- Sam Horn, college football quarterback for the Missouri Tigers and baseball pitcher in the Los Angeles Dodgers organization
- Travis Hunter, NFL football player
- Matt Lanter, model and actor
- Kyle Maynard, author and athlete
- Maya Moore, WNBA basketball player and Olympic gold medalist
- Nasim Nuñez, Major League Baseball player
- Elena Shinohara, Olympic gymnast and social media personality
- Tereese Smith, NFL cheerleader
