= Deuce Geralds =

American football player

No. 99 – LSU Tigers
- Position: Defensive tackle
- Class: Freshman

Personal information
- Listed height: 6 ft 1 in (1.85 m)
- Listed weight: 279 lb (127 kg)

Career information
- High school: Collins Hill (Suwanee, Georgia)
- College: LSU (2026–present)
- Stats at ESPN

Daverin "Deuce" Geralds II is an American college football defensive tackle for the LSU Tigers.

== Early life ==
Geralds attended Collins Hill High School in Suwanee, Georgia, where he played defensive tackle and running back. As a senior in 2025, he was named the Georgia Public Broadcast Sports Most Outstanding Defensive Player after recording 91 tackles, 16 sacks and seven forced fumbles. He also added 533 rushing yards and 15 touchdowns on offense. He committed to Louisiana State University (LSU) to play college football.

== College career ==
Geralds competed for a starting job his true freshman year at LSU in 2026.
