= Al Lolotai =

Samoan gridiron football player (1920–1990)

- Lolotai in 1946

No. 26, 30
- Position: Guard

Personal information
- Born: June 22, 1920; Western Samoa Trust Territory
- Died: September 30, 1990 (aged 70); Pago Pago, American Samoa
- Listed height: 6 ft 0 in (1.83 m)
- Listed weight: 224 lb (102 kg)

Career information
- High school: ʻIolani School (Honolulu, Hawaii)
- College: Weber JC; Colorado A&M
- NFL draft: 1945: undrafted

Career history
- Washington Redskins (1945); Los Angeles Dons (1946–1949)

Career NFL/AAFC statistics
- Games played: 59
- Games started: 32
- Interceptions: 1
- Stats at Pro Football Reference

Albert Lolotai (June 22, 1920 – September 30, 1990) was a Samoa-born American football offensive lineman. He played college football at Weber Junior College. Lolotai was the first Samoan American and Polynesian to play professional American football.

After his football career was over, Lolotai worked as a professional wrestler throughout Australasia, at one time holding a belt as Hawaiian heavyweight wrestling champion.

== Biography ==
=== Early life ===
Al Lolotai was born in the Western Samoa Trust Territory and came to Hawaii with his family at the age of 9, knowing just three words of English. He grew up in the town of Laie. He attended Kahuku High School and graduated from 'Iolani School in Honolulu, Hawai'i.

He then attended Weber Junior College (now Weber State University) in Ogden, Utah, playing on the Weber Wildcats football team from 1941 to 1942, and served in the Hawaii Territorial Guard during World War 2.

=== Pro football career ===
From 1945 to 1949, Lolotai played professional football, first in the National Football League for the Washington Redskins in 1945 before jumping to the Los Angeles Dons of the rival All-America Football Conference in 1946. As a member of the Redskis, Lolotai started at guard as a rookie and helped take his team to the 1945 Championship Playoff, a defeat at the hands of the Cleveland Rams.

Lolotai remained with the Dons until the end of the league in 1949. He played in a total of 59 games with 32 starts across the two professional leagues, additionally recording one interception with Washington in 1945.

Lolotai (below) on the program for a November 2, 1947 game with the rival San Francisco 49ers.

=== Wrestling career ===
After his time in pro football, Lolotai worked as a professional wrestler in Australia, New Zealand, Fiji, and Samoa. He at one time held the title of Hawaiian heavyweight wrestling champion.

=== Athletic director ===
Lolotai would return to school and graduate with a Master's degree in physical education from Colorado A&M, working his way through school as a line coach for the Rams football team. With the founding of Church College of Hawaii in 1955, serve as its first Athletic Director. He mentored many of the young Samoan football players coming up in the Laie community to keep up with their studies, get into good schools, and helped set them up for their future.

A British citizen from birth, Lolotai renounced his British citizenship in 1961 to become a naturalized American citizen. He was the founder of the American Samoan Community Association and served a term as president of Big Brothers of Hawaii.

In his later years, he returned to Samoa at the request of its government, helping the establish its high school football program, for which he continued to coach until his death.

=== Death and legacy ===
Al Lolotai died September 30, 1990, in Pago Pago, American Samoa. He was 70 years old at the time of his death.

He was survived by his wife, Matilda Lolotai, five sons, and a daughter.

One of his sons, Tiloi, also attended 'Iolani School and then went to play football for Colorado as a defensive tackle, lettering from 1974 to 1976.

== See also ==
- List of gridiron football players who became professional wrestlers
