= Kahuku, Hawaii =

Census-designated place in Hawaii, United States

Kahuku
- Census-designated place
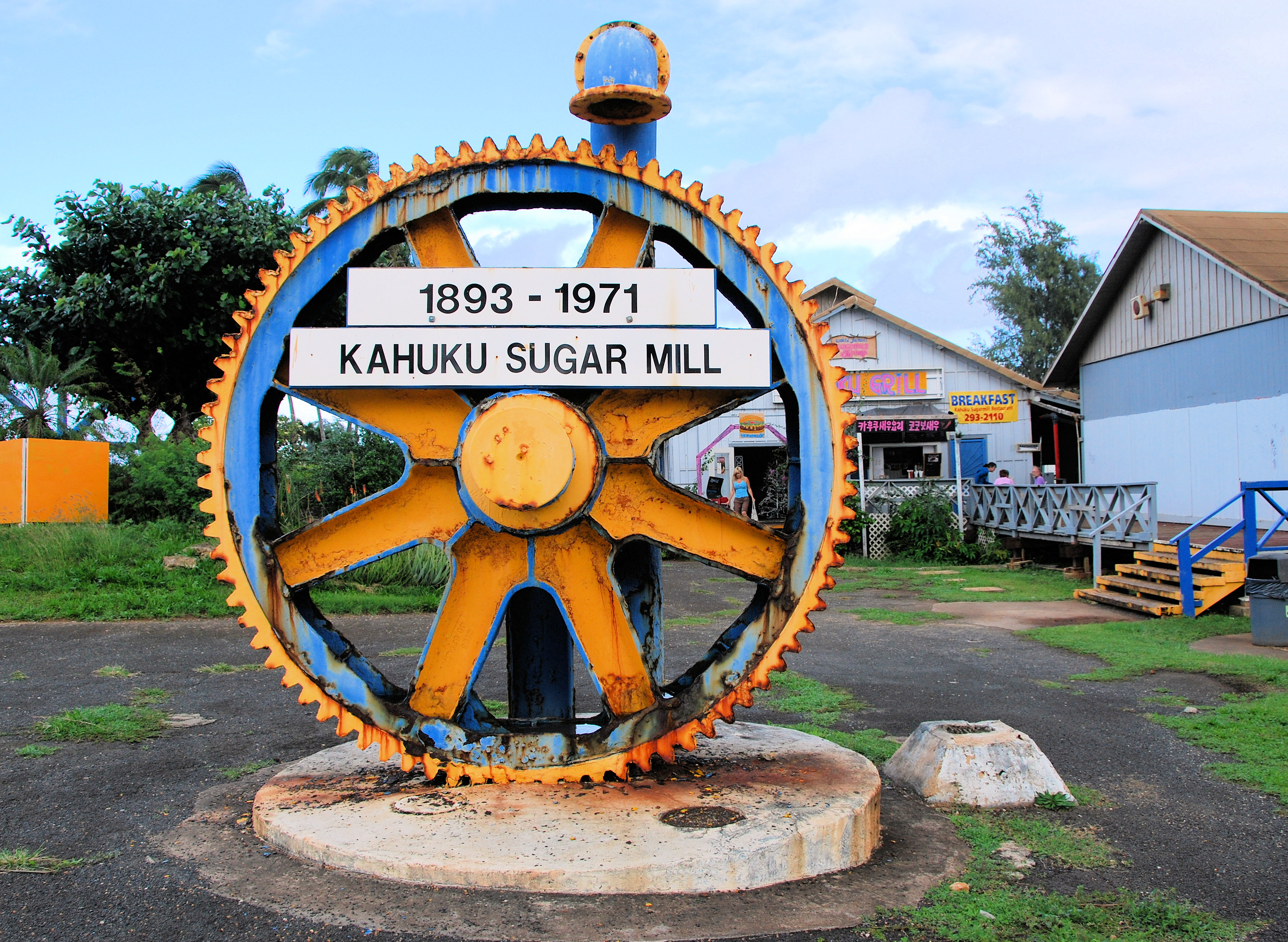
- Kahuku Sugar Mill sign in Kahuku

- Location in Honolulu County and the state of Hawaii
- Coordinates: 21°40′49″N 157°57′1″W
- Country: United States
- State: Hawaii
- County: Honolulu

Area
  - Total: 2.31 sq mi (5.97 km^{2})
  - Land: 0.96 sq mi (2.49 km^{2})
  - Water: 1.34 sq mi (3.48 km^{2})
- Elevation: 15 ft (4.6 m)

Population (2020)
  - Total: 2,852
  - Density: 2,961.4/sq mi (1,143.39/km^{2})
- Time zone: UTC−10:00 (Hawaii-Aleutian)
- ZIP Code: 96731
- Area code: 808
- FIPS code: 15-22250
- GNIS feature ID: 0359833

Kahuku (Hawaiian pronunciation: [kəˈhuku]) is a census-designated place (CDP) in Honolulu, Hawaii, United States. In the Hawaiian language, ka huku means "the projection", presumably a reference to Kahuku Point nearby, the northernmost point of land on the island of Oahu. As of the 2020 census, Kahuku had a population of 2,852.

== Geography ==
Kahuku is located at 21°40′49″N 157°57′1″W. This community is located northwest from Laie and east from Kuilima and Kawela Bay along Kamehameha Highway (Route 83).

According to the United States Census Bureau, the CDP has a total area of 2.3 square miles (6.0 km^{2}), of which 1.0 square mile (2.6 km^{2}) is land and 1.3 square miles (3.4 km^{2}) is water. The total area is 57.46% water, the Pacific Ocean lying off the coast in the census tract.

=== Climate ===
Kahuku has a tropical savanna climate (Köppen: As) with warm to hot temperatures throughout the year. The all time record high is 95 °F (35 °C), set on October 3rd, 2003, whilst the all time record low is 50 °F (10 °C), set on February 1st, 1985 and January 2nd, 2015. Kahuku falls into the USDA Plant Hardiness Zone 12b.

Climate data for Kahuku, Hawaii (1991–2020 normals, extremes 1980–present)
Month	Jan	Feb	Mar	Apr	May	Jun	Jul	Aug	Sep	Oct	Nov	Dec	Year
Record high °F (°C)	91 (33)	90 (32)	88 (31)	90 (32)	88 (31)	89 (32)	91 (33)	92 (33)	94 (34)	95 (35)	91 (33)	91 (33)	95 (35)
Mean maximum °F (°C)	83.3 (28.5)	81.8 (27.7)	81.9 (27.7)	82.7 (28.2)	83.0 (28.3)	83.4 (28.6)	84.7 (29.3)	85.2 (29.6)	85.6 (29.8)	86.0 (30.0)	83.6 (28.7)	82.4 (28.0)	87.4 (30.8)
Mean daily maximum °F (°C)	77.0 (25.0)	76.5 (24.7)	76.8 (24.9)	77.8 (25.4)	79.6 (26.4)	81.1 (27.3)	82.2 (27.9)	82.9 (28.3)	83.1 (28.4)	82.4 (28.0)	79.6 (26.4)	77.8 (25.4)	79.7 (26.5)
Daily mean °F (°C)	71.5 (21.9)	71.1 (21.7)	71.9 (22.2)	73.4 (23.0)	74.9 (23.8)	76.8 (24.9)	77.8 (25.4)	78.7 (25.9)	78.5 (25.8)	77.6 (25.3)	75.3 (24.1)	73.3 (22.9)	75.1 (23.9)
Mean daily minimum °F (°C)	65.9 (18.8)	65.7 (18.7)	67.1 (19.5)	69.0 (20.6)	70.2 (21.2)	72.6 (22.6)	73.4 (23.0)	74.6 (23.7)	74.0 (23.3)	72.8 (22.7)	71.0 (21.7)	68.8 (20.4)	70.4 (21.3)
Mean minimum °F (°C)	59.0 (15.0)	59.3 (15.2)	60.8 (16.0)	62.9 (17.2)	64.6 (18.1)	68.8 (20.4)	70.0 (21.1)	70.3 (21.3)	69.5 (20.8)	67.6 (19.8)	64.8 (18.2)	62.5 (16.9)	56.5 (13.6)
Record low °F (°C)	50 (10)	50 (10)	55 (13)	57 (14)	55 (13)	60 (16)	58 (14)	60 (16)	59 (15)	56 (13)	56 (13)	51 (11)	50 (10)
Average rainfall inches (mm)	2.79 (71)	3.25 (83)	3.86 (98)	2.03 (52)	2.02 (51)	1.51 (38)	1.82 (46)	2.00 (51)	2.25 (57)	3.08 (78)	4.05 (103)	3.95 (100)	32.61 (828)
Average rainy days (≥ 0.01 in)	13.6	13.4	16.6	15.5	13.7	16.6	18.2	16.7	16.2	15.6	17.7	17.8	191.6
Source: NOAA

== Demographics ==
Historical population
Census	Pop.	Note	%±
2010	2,614		—
2020	2,852		9.1%
U.S. Decennial Census

=== 2020 census ===
As of the 2020 census, Kahuku had a population of 2,852. The median age was 33.1 years. 31.6% of residents were under the age of 18 and 12.6% of residents were 65 years of age or older. For every 100 females there were 88.1 males, and for every 100 females age 18 and over there were 87.2 males age 18 and over.

0.0% of residents lived in urban areas, while 100.0% lived in rural areas.

There were 637 households in Kahuku, of which 50.7% had children under the age of 18 living in them. Of all households, 54.5% were married-couple households, 15.4% were households with a male householder and no spouse or partner present, and 27.2% were households with a female householder and no spouse or partner present. About 18.8% of all households were made up of individuals and 11.7% had someone living alone who was 65 years of age or older.

There were 680 housing units, of which 6.3% were vacant. The homeowner vacancy rate was 0.8% and the rental vacancy rate was 4.5%.

Racial composition as of the 2020 census
Race	Number	Percent
White	297	10.4%
Black or African American	9	0.3%
American Indian and Alaska Native	6	0.2%
Asian	626	21.9%
Native Hawaiian and Other Pacific Islander	974	34.2%
Some other race	20	0.7%
Two or more races	920	32.3%
Hispanic or Latino (of any race)	186	6.5%

=== 2000 census ===
As of the census of 2000, there were 2,097 people, 509 households, and 401 families residing in the CDP. The population density was 2,150.9 inhabitants per square mile (830.5/km^{2}). There were 518 housing units at an average density of 531.3 per square mile (205.1/km^{2}). The racial makeup of the CDP was 11.06% White, 0.29% Black or African American, 0.14% Native American, 26.85% Asian, 27.28% Pacific Islander, 1.05% from other races, and 33.33% from two or more races. 8.63% of the population were Hispanic or Latino of any race.

There were 509 households, out of which 43.2% had children under the age of 18 living with them, 59.3% were married couples living together, 14.3% had a female householder with no husband present, and 21.2% were non-families. 19.8% of all households were made up of individuals, and 11.0% had someone living alone who was 65 years of age or older. The average household size was 3.96 and the average family size was 4.63.

In the CDP the population was spread out, with 35.4% under the age of 18, 10.7% from 18 to 24, 23.3% from 25 to 44, 17.8% from 45 to 64, and 12.7% who were 65 years of age or older. The median age was 28 years. For every 100 females, there were 101.2 males. For every 100 females age 18 and over, there were 96.9 males.

The median income for a household in the CDP was $39,135, and the median income for a family was $47,045. Males had a median income of $29,934 versus $22,366 for females. The per capita income for the CDP was $12,340. 14.6% of the population and 11.8% of families were below the poverty line. Out of the total population, 17.4% of those under the age of 18 and 17.7% of those 65 and older were living below the poverty line.

== Areas of interest ==
The ZIP Code for Kahuku is 96731. In the mid-1970s a popular television game show, The Diamond Head Game, was held on the grounds of Del Webb's Kuilima Hotel (today the Turtle Bay Resort), located just to the west. At the end of each show the announcer would say, "If you plan to be in Hawaii, send a self-addressed, stamped envelope to the Diamond Head Game, Kahuku, Oahu 96731." The Fox TV series North Shore was filmed there in 2004.

Places of interest in the area include beaches, hiking, fishing, art galleries, and several shrimp trucks in the vicinity. Mālaekahana Beach has an entrance from Kahuku and from Lāʻie, Hawaii.

== Kahuku football ==
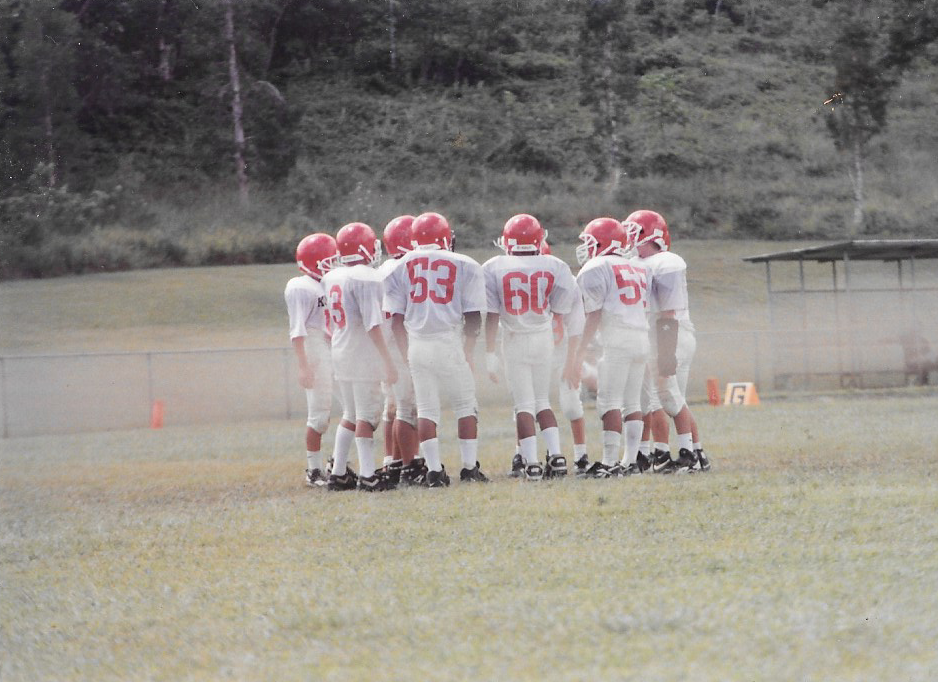
Young, football players

Many of the people in the Kahuku community and in the football community have Samoan or Tongan roots and high school football has become quite important to them.

Kahuku High School in this small, rural, coastal town on the North Shore of Oahu has produced many American football players. The players are regularly scouted by American colleges and universities. Many end up playing professionally for the National Football League.

== Government and infrastructure ==
The Honolulu Police Department operates the Kahuku Substation in Kahuku.

== Education ==
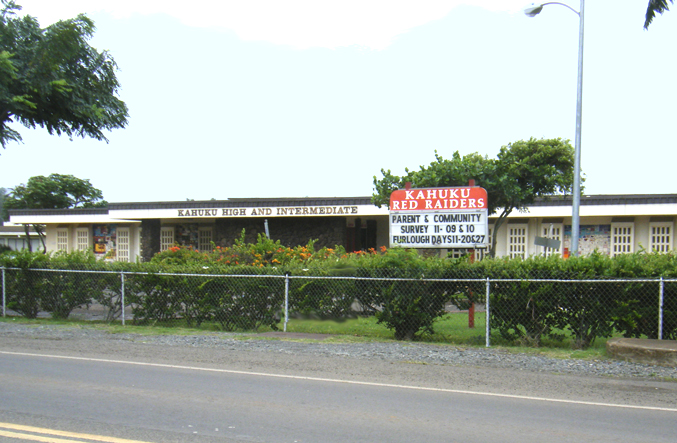
Kahuku High & Intermediate School

The Hawaii Department of Education operates the public schools. Kahuku Elementary School and Kahuku High & Intermediate School are located in Kahuku CDP.
